= Iliesa Tanivula =

New Zealand rugby player and coach (born 1975)

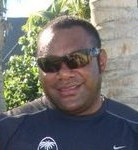
- Born: Iliesa Samusamuvodre Tanivula; 20 September 1975 (age 51)
- Height: 1.8 m (5 ft 11 in)
- Weight: 100 kg (220 lb)
- Notable relative(s): Joe Rokocoko (cousin); Joeli Vidiri (cousin)

Rugby union career
- Position(s): Wing, Centre, Fullback
Provincial / State sides
Years	Team	Apps	(Points)
1999–2004	Auckland	58	(170)
Super Rugby
Years	Team	Apps	(Points)
1999	Brumbies	5	(5)
2000	Blues	11	(10)
2001	Highlanders	23	(20)
National sevens team
Years	Team		Comps
2002	New Zealand 7s		
Coaching career
- Years: Team
- 2008: Nadi
- 2008: Western Crusaders
- 2009: Fiji Warriors
- 2008–11: Fiji 7s

Iliesa Samusamuvodre Tanivula (born 20 September 1975) is a former New Zealand sevens player and the current coach of the Fiji sevens team. Tanivula could play most positions in the backline. He mainly played at centre, wing or fullback.

== Playing career ==
Tanivula was a secondary school sprinter in Fiji and attended Natabua High school. He was a soccer star in Fiji, playing for the Fiji Under-17 before joining the Auckland Development XV in 1997. Tanivula returned to Fiji in 1998 to play for his home side Nadi in the Farebrother Sullivan Trophy challenge against Suva and that was where Tanivula's talent was spotted by Eddie Jones who signed him up with the ACT Brumbies.

He made his debut for Auckland for their National Provincial Championship (NPC) competition in 1999 and in that same year they won the NPC. He had offers from the ACT Brumbies as well as the Auckland Blues to be part of their Super 12 team after having a short stint with the Brumbies in 1999. After playing for the blues in the 2000, He was selected into the New Zealand sevens side he made his debut for the Otago Highlanders in 2001. Tanivula was named player of the NPC in 2003 after his brilliance performance in guiding the Auckland side to another victory as they retained the title. Tanivula headed to Japan in 2005 to represent the Kamaishi Seawaves. A series of injuries to both of his knees ended his playing career in 2006.

== Coaching career ==
Tanivula coached the Nadi rugby team in the Digicel Cup and in 2008 he created history by winning the Farebrother Sullivan Trophy as well as the Digicel Cup. He also guided the Western Crusaders team which won the Colonial Cup. In early 2009, he guided the Fiji Warriors team to the 2009 Pacific Rugby Cup defeating the Upolu Samoa team in the final. His impressive work pleased the Fiji Rugby Union and they offered him the head coaching job of the Fiji sevens team, a position left vacant after the termination of Waisale Serevi's contract. He coached his first sevens tournament in Wellington where Fiji was bundled out in the quarter finals. the following week in San Diego, Fiji was bundled out in the quarters again. He then coached Fiji to the 2009 Rugby World Cup Sevens where Fiji lost in the quarter finals again and thus losing their world champions status. A few weeks later he turned the table in Hong Kong when Fiji defeated South Africa and claimed a first win in 2 years. He then coached the side to the 2009 World Games where Fiji defeated Portugal to retain their gold medal. Fiji lost at the 2009 London Sevens but won a week later at Murrayfield and finished 2nd in the season under Tanivula's guidance. Tanivula renewed his contract with the FRU for another 3 years hoping to guide Fiji to the 2013 Rugby World Cup Sevens but he was fired in 2011 and replaced by the inept Alifereti Dere who failed to win the Melrose Cup just like his predecessor as the team finished 3rd. Tanivula returned to coaching in the Digicel Cup with Nadi.
