= Luke Morahan =

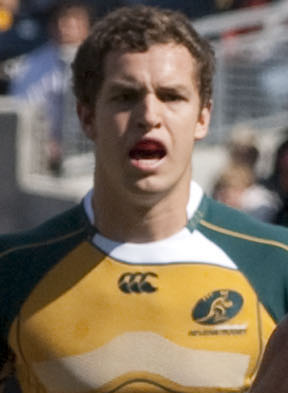
- Luke Morahan
- Born: Luke Morahan; 13 April 1990 (age 36) Brisbane, Queensland, Australia
- Height: 1.88 m (6 ft 2 in)
- Weight: 95 kg (209 lb; 14 st 13 lb)
- School: The Southport School

Rugby union career
- Position(s): Wing, Fullback
Senior career
Years	Team	Apps	(Points)
2014	Perth Spirit	5	(10)
2017-2023	Bristol Bears	92	(192)
Super Rugby
Years	Team	Apps	(Points)
2009–2013	Reds	46	(55)
2014–2017	Force	34	(55)
- Correct as of 20 July 2016
International career
Years	Team	Apps	(Points)
2012	Australia	3	(0)
- Correct as of 19 November 2016
National sevens team
Years	Team		Comps
2008	Australia sevens		
Medal record
Men's rugby sevens
Representing Australia
Commonwealth Games
Silver medal – second place	2010 Delhi	Team competition

Luke Morahan (born 13 April 1990) is an Australian rugby player currently playing for the Bristol Bears in the English Premiership since 2017. Morahan's main position is on the wing, however, he does also play fullback.

== Career ==
Morahan represented the Queensland U-16, Qld Schools and Australia A Schools before entering the Premier Colts (U19) ranks in 2008. He was also one of the top try scorers in the premier competition with 10 tries. He has also represented Australia internationally in the IRB Sevens World Series circuit. He made his 7's debut in the 2008 South Africa Sevens where he was the equal top try scorer with seven tries. He notched up four tries in the Wellington leg and his impressive appearance continued when he notched a further six tries in San Diego, before joining the Reds academy. He got called up for the Reds, making his debut against the Lions in the Super 14 competition before a shoulder injury ruled him out of the season, however Wallaby coach Robbie Deans was sufficiently impressed with the youngster's performances and after a calf injury ruled out Wallaby centre, Stirling Mortlock, Morahan was called up to join the Wallabies on their 2009 Autumn Internationals.

He joined the Australian sevens team for the 2010 Commonwealth Games where his team won the silver medal. He got another call-up from the Wallabies as he was included in their squad for the 2010 Autumn Internationals. Morahan was called up to the Wallabies squad to play the British & Irish Lions following his try against the Lions with the Queensland Reds.

On 20 March 2017, Morahan left Australia to travel to England to sign for Bristol Rugby ahead of the 2017–18 season. At the end of the 2017–18 season, Morahan helped his new club to win the RFU Championship title and promotion to the Premiership. He also finished as the top try scorer in the league that season with 17 tries.

== Super Rugby statistics ==
As of 20 July 2016

Season	Team	Games	Starts	Sub	Mins	Tries	Cons	Pens	Drops	Points	Yel	Red
2009	Reds	2	1	1	56	0	0	0	0	0	0	0
2010	Reds	6	4	2	350	2	0	0	0	10	0	0
2011	Reds	12	10	2	758	6	0	0	0	30	0	0
2012	Reds	17	15	2	1247	2	0	0	0	10	0	0
2013	Reds	9	6	3	536	1	0	0	0	5	0	0
2014	Force	7	7	0	544	2	0	0	0	10	0	0
2015	Force	15	15	0	1153	5	0	0	0	25	0	0
2016	Force	12	12	0	938	4	0	0	0	20	0	0
Total		80	70	10	5582	22	0	0	0	110	0	0

== Honours ==
Bristol

- European Rugby Challenge Cup: 2019–20
- RFU Championship: 2017–18
- RFU Championship top try scorer: 2017–18 (17 tries)
