= 2008 Dubai Sevens =

The Dubai Sevens is played annually as part of the IRB Sevens World Series for international rugby sevens (seven-a-side version of rugby union). The 2008 competition was held on November 28 and 29 at The Sevens, a brand-new facility built to host the 2009 Rugby World Cup Sevens. It was the first of eight events in the 2008-09 IRB Sevens World Series. The top-tier Cup trophy was won by South Africa.

This was the first edition of the Dubai Sevens to be held at The Sevens. Previous editions were held at the Dubai Exiles Rugby Ground.

== Format ==
The tournament consists of four round-robin pools of four teams. All sixteen teams progress to the knockout stage. The top two teams from each group progress to quarter-finals in the main competition, with the winners of those quarter-finals competing in cup semi-finals and the losers competing in plate semi-finals. The bottom two teams from each group progress to quarter-finals in the consolation competition, with the winners of those quarter-finals competing in bowl semi-finals and the losers competing in shield semi-finals.

== Teams ==
- Australia
- England
- France
- Fiji
- Georgia
- Kenya
- New Zealand
- Portugal
- Samoa
- Scotland
- South Africa
- United States
- Wales
- Zimbabwe

== Pool stages ==
=== Pool A ===
Team	Pld	W	D	L	PF	PA	+/-	Pts
New Zealand	3	3	0	0	104	21	+83	9
Australia	3	2	0	1	50	62	−12	7
Wales	3	1	0	2	50	62	−12	5
Zimbabwe	3	0	0	3	31	90	−59	3

Date	Team 1	Score	Team 2
2008-11-28	New Zealand	28 - 7	Wales
2008-11-28	Australia	21 - 12	Zimbabwe
2008-11-28	New Zealand	43 - 7	Zimbabwe
2008-11-28	Australia	22 - 17	Wales
2008-11-28	Wales	26 - 12	Zimbabwe
2008-11-28	New Zealand	33 - 7	Australia

=== Pool B ===
Team	Pld	W	D	L	PF	PA	+/-	Pts
South Africa	3	3	0	0	95	10	+85	9
Kenya	3	2	0	1	66	38	+28	7
Scotland	3	1	0	2	29	83	−54	5
Arabian Gulf	3	0	0	3	21	80	−59	3

Date	Team 1	Score	Team 2
2008-11-28	South Africa	31 - 10	Scotland
2008-11-28	Kenya	28 - 7	Arabian Gulf
2008-11-28	South Africa	33 - 0	Arabian Gulf
2008-11-28	Kenya	38 - 0	Scotland
2008-11-28	Scotland	19 - 14	Arabian Gulf
2008-11-28	South Africa	31 - 0	Kenya

=== Pool C ===
Team	Pld	W	D	L	PF	PA	+/-	Pts
Samoa	3	3	0	0	71	26	+45	9
Argentina	3	2	0	1	52	33	+19	7
France	3	1	0	2	35	53	−17	5
Georgia	3	0	0	3	26	73	−47	3

Date	Team 1	Score	Team 2
2008-11-28	Samoa	19 - 14	France
2008-11-28	Argentina	26 - 7	Georgia
2008-11-28	Samoa	33 - 7	Georgia
2008-11-28	Argentina	21 - 7	France
2008-11-28	France	14 - 12	Georgia
2008-11-28	Samoa	19 - 5	Argentina

=== Pool D ===
Team	Pld	W	D	L	PF	PA	+/-	Pts
England	3	3	0	0	83	22	+61	9
Fiji	3	2	0	1	64	40	+24	7
Portugal	3	1	0	2	29	55	−26	5
United States	3	0	0	3	34	93	−59	3

Date	Team 1	Score	Team 2
2008-11-28	Fiji	47 - 12	United States
2008-11-28	England	31 - 7	Portugal
2008-11-28	Fiji	12 - 0	Portugal
2008-11-28	England	24 - 10	United States
2008-11-28	United States	12 - 22	Portugal
2008-11-28	Fiji	5 - 28	England

== Knockout ==
=== Shield ===
Quarter-finals
November 29 - The Sevens, Dubai
Wales	26
Arabian Gulf	7
November 29 - The Sevens, Dubai
Portugal	19
Georgia	7
November 29 - The Sevens, Dubai
France	22
United States	12
November 29 - The Sevens, Dubai
Scotland	5
Zimbabwe	19

Semi-finals
November 29 - The Sevens, Dubai
Arabian Gulf	22
Georgia	12
November 29 - The Sevens, Dubai
United States	17
Scotland	14

Final
November 29 - The Sevens, Dubai
Arabian Gulf	7
United States	31

=== Bowl ===
Quarter-finals
November 29 - The Sevens, Dubai
Wales	26
Arabian Gulf	7
November 29 - The Sevens, Dubai
Portugal	19
Georgia	7
November 29 - The Sevens, Dubai
France	22
United States	12
November 29 - The Sevens, Dubai
Scotland	5
Zimbabwe	19

Semi-finals
November 29 - The Sevens, Dubai
Wales	0
Portugal	24
November 29 - The Sevens, Dubai
France	17
Zimbabwe	12

Final
November 29 - The Sevens, Dubai
Portugal	24
France	0

=== Plate ===
Quarter-finals
November 29 - The Sevens, Dubai
New Zealand	21
Kenya	17
November 29 - The Sevens, Dubai
England	15
Argentina	5
November 29 - The Sevens, Dubai
Samoa	7
Fiji	12
November 29 - The Sevens, Dubai
South Africa	19
Australia	0

Semi-finals
November 29 - The Sevens, Dubai
Kenya	26
Argentina	24
November 29 - The Sevens, Dubai
Samoa	17
Australia	14

Final
November 29 - The Sevens, Dubai
Kenya	7
Samoa	12

=== Cup ===
Quarter-finals
November 29 - The Sevens, Dubai
New Zealand	21
Kenya	17
November 29 - The Sevens, Dubai
England	15
Argentina	5
November 29 - The Sevens, Dubai
Samoa	7
Fiji	12
November 29 - The Sevens, Dubai
South Africa	19
Australia	0

Semi-finals
November 29 - The Sevens, Dubai
New Zealand	19
England	21
November 29 - The Sevens, Dubai
Fiji	7
South Africa	10

Final
November 29 - The Sevens, Dubai
England	12
South Africa	19

== Statistics ==
=== Individual points ===
Individual points Updated:2008-11-30
Pos.	Player	Country	Points
1	Tomasi Cama	New Zealand	41
2	Ollie Phillips	England	39
3	Lavin Asego	Kenya	36
4=	Collins Injera	Kenya	35
4=	Mzwandile Stick	South Africa	35
6	Lolo Lui	Samoa	32
7	Pedro Leal	Portugal	31
8	Tim Nanai-Williams	New Zealand	26
9=	Robert Ebersohn	South Africa	25
9=	Rayno Benjamin	South Africa	25

=== Individual tries ===
Individual tries Updated:2008-11-30
Pos.	Player	Country	Tries
1	Collins Injera	Kenya	7
2=	Rayno Benjamin	South Africa	5
2=	Isoa Damu	England	5
2=	Robert Ebersohn	South Africa	5
2=	David Mateus	Portugal	5
6=	Thomas Combezou	France	4
6=	Apelu Fa'aiuga	Samoa	4
6=	Vereniki Goneva	Fiji	4
6=	Tim Mikkelson	New Zealand	4
6=	Tim Nanai-Williams	New Zealand	4

== Notes and references ==
Preceded by Edinburgh Sevens	Dubai Sevens; 2008	Succeeded by George Sevens
