= 2009 Adelaide Sevens =

- IRB Sevens X
- Host nation: Australia
- Date: 3–5 April 2009

Cup
- Champion: South Africa
- Runner-up: Kenya

Plate
- Winner: England
- Runner-up: Australia

Bowl
- Winner: Samoa
- Runner-up: France

Shield
- Winner: United States
- Runner-up: Scotland

The 2009 Adelaide Sevens, promoted as the International Rugby Sevens Adelaide 2009, was a rugby sevens tournament that was part of the IRB Sevens World Series in the 2008–09 season. It was the Australian Sevens leg of the series, held between 3 and 5 April at the Adelaide Oval in South Australia.

South Africa retained their title, and took an almost unassailable lead in the 2008-09 IRB Sevens World Series, defeating rapidly improving Kenya in the final. England won the Plate, Samoa the Bowl and the US the Shield.

== Format ==
The teams were drawn into four pools of four teams each. Each team played the other teams in their pool once, with 3 points awarded for a win, 2 points for a draw, and 1 point for a loss (no points awarded for a forfeit). The top two teams from each group progressed to quarter-finals in the main competition, with the winners of those quarter-finals competing in cup semi-finals and the losers competing in plate semi-finals. The bottom two teams from each group progressed to quarter-finals in the consolation competition, with the winners of those quarter-finals competing in bowl semi-finals and the losers competing in shield semi-finals.

== Teams ==
The participating teams were:

- Argentina
- Australia
- Cook Islands
- England
- France
- Fiji
- Japan
- Kenya
- New Zealand
- Portugal
- Samoa
- Scotland
- South Africa
- Tonga
- United States
- Wales

== Pool stages ==
The tournament started on the Friday night and Saturday with matches between teams in the same pool on a round robin basis. The following is a list of the recorded results.

=== Pool A ===
Team	Pld	W	D	L	PF	PA	+/-	Pts
Australia	3	3	0	0	78	41	+37	9
England	3	1	1	1	70	45	+25	6
Samoa	3	1	1	1	69	55	+14	6
Portugal	3	0	0	3	10	86	-76	3

Date	Team 1	Score	Team 2
2009-04-03	England	17–21	Australia
2009-04-03	Samoa	26–5	Portugal
2009-04-04	England	29–0	Portugal
2009-04-04	Samoa	26–19	Australia
2009-04-04	Australia	31–5	Portugal
2009-04-04	England	24–24	Samoa

=== Pool B ===
Team	Pld	W	D	L	PF	PA	+/-	Pts
Fiji	3	3	0	0	80	38	+42	9
Argentina	3	2	0	1	47	40	+7	7
France	3	1	0	2	41	47	-6	5
Scotland	3	0	0	3	26	69	-43	3

Date	Team 1	Score	Team 2
2009-04-03	Argentina	14–7	France
2009-04-03	Fiji	33–7	Scotland
2009-04-04	Argentina	12–7	Scotland
2009-04-04	Fiji	21–10	France
2009-04-04	France	24–12	Scotland
2009-04-04	Argentina	21–26	Fiji

=== Pool C ===
Team	Pld	W	D	L	PF	PA	+/-	Pts
New Zealand	3	3	0	0	84	15	+69	9
Wales	3	1	0	2	53	67	-14	5
United States	3	1	0	2	39	65	-26	5
Tonga	3	1	0	2	40	69	-29	5

Date	Team 1	Score	Team 2
2009-04-03	New Zealand	24–10	Wales
2009-04-03	United States	17–14	Tonga
2009-04-04	New Zealand	33–0	Tonga
2009-04-04	United States	17–24	Wales
2009-04-04	Wales	19–26	Tonga
2009-04-04	New Zealand	27–5	United States

=== Pool D ===
Team	Pld	W	D	L	PF	PA	+/-	Pts
Kenya	3	3	0	0	54	19	+35	9
South Africa	3	2	0	1	85	22	+63	7
Japan	3	1	0	2	25	67	-42	5
Cook Islands	3	0	0	3	19	75	-56	3

Date	Team 1	Score	Team 2
2009-04-03	South Africa	28–7	Cook Islands
2009-04-03	Kenya	12–5	Japan
2009-04-04	South Africa	43–0	Japan
2009-04-04	Kenya	27–0	Cook Islands
2009-04-04	Cook Islands	12–20	Japan
2009-04-04	South Africa	14–15	Kenya

== Knockout ==
Play on the last day of the tournament consisted of finals matches for the Bowl, Plate, and Cup competitions. The following is a list of the recorded results.

=== Shield ===
Quarter-finals
5 April - Adelaide, Australia
Samoa	27
Scotland	14
5 April - Adelaide, Australia
Japan	19
Tonga	33
5 April - Adelaide, Australia
United States	19
Cook Islands	31
5 April - Adelaide, Australia
France	27
Portugal	12

Semi-finals
5 April - Adelaide, Australia
Scotland	17
Japan	14
5 April - Adelaide, Australia
United States	29
Portugal	14

Final
5 April - Adelaide, Australia
Scotland	21
United States	24

=== Bowl ===
Quarter-finals
5 April - Adelaide, Australia
Samoa	27
Scotland	14
5 April - Adelaide, Australia
Japan	19
Tonga	33
5 April - Adelaide, Australia
United States	19
Cook Islands	31
5 April - Adelaide, Australia
France	27
Portugal	12

Semi-finals
5 April - Adelaide, Australia
Samoa	24
Tonga	12
5 April - Adelaide, Australia
Cook Islands	14
France	35

Final
5 April - Adelaide, Australia
Samoa	35
France	14

=== Plate ===
Quarter-finals
5 April - Adelaide, Australia
Australia	5
Argentina	12
5 April - Adelaide, Australia
Kenya	33
Wales	14
5 April - Adelaide, Australia
New Zealand	0
South Africa	17
5 April - Adelaide, Australia
Fiji	40
England	0

Semi-finals
5 April - Adelaide, Australia
Australia	38
Wales	7
5 April - Adelaide, Australia
New Zealand	14
England	21

Final
5 April - Adelaide, Australia
Australia	19
England	24

=== Cup ===
Quarter-finals
5 April - Adelaide, Australia
Australia	5
Argentina	12
5 April - Adelaide, Australia
Kenya	33
Wales	14
5 April - Adelaide, Australia
New Zealand	0
South Africa	17
5 April - Adelaide, Australia
Fiji	40
England	0

Semi-finals
5 April - Adelaide, Australia
Argentina	5
Kenya	17
5 April - Adelaide, Australia
South Africa	21
Fiji	10

Final
5 April - Adelaide, Australia
Kenya	7
South Africa	26

== Statistics ==
=== Individual points ===
Individual points Updated:2009-04-05
Pos.	Player	Country	Points
1	Richard Kingi	Australia	46
2	Renfred Dazel	South Africa	43
3	Lolo Lui	Samoa	41
4	Nasoni Roko	Fiji	33
5=	Lionel Mapoe	South Africa	30
5=	Kevin Swiryn	United States	30
5=	Afa Aiono	Samoa	30
5=	Ben Gollings	England	30
5=	Tom Varndell	England	30
10	Martin Rodriguez	Argentina	29

=== Individual tries ===
Individual tries Updated:2009-04-05
Pos.	Player	Country	Tries
1=	Afa Aiono	Samoa	6
1=	Lionel Mapoe	South Africa	6
1=	Kevin Swiryn	United States	6
1=	Tom Varndell	England	6
5=	Alafoti Fa'osiliva	Samoa	5
5=	Shaun Foley	Australia	5
5=	Vereniki Goneva	Fiji	5
5=	Collins Injera	Kenya	5
5=	Nasoni Roko	Fiji	5
5=	Niumaia Rokobuli	Fiji	5

== Reference list ==
Preceded by Hong Kong Sevens	Adelaide Sevens; 2009	Succeeded by London Sevens
