= 2009 Wellington Sevens =

The NZI Wellington Sevens is played annually as part of the IRB Sevens World Series for international rugby sevens (seven-a-side version of rugby union). The 2009 competition, which takes place on 6 and 7 February is the third Cup trophy in the 2008–09 IRB Sevens World Series.

== Teams ==
- Argentina
- Australia
- Canada
- Cook Islands
- England
- France
- Fiji
- Kenya
- New Zealand
- Niue
- Samoa
- Scotland
- South Africa
- Tonga
- United States
- Wales

== Pool Stages ==
=== Pool A ===
Team	Pld	W	D	L	PF	PA	+/-	Pts
Kenya	3	2	0	1	57	50	+7	7
South Africa	3	2	0	1	63	27	+36	7
Tonga	3	1	0	2	40	58	-18	5
Scotland	3	1	0	2	34	59	-25	5

Date	Team 1	Score	Team 2
6 February 2009	South Africa	24 – 0	Scotland
6 February 2009	Kenya	21 – 14	Tonga
6 February 2009	South Africa	22 – 5	Tonga
6 February 2009	Kenya	14 – 19	Scotland
6 February 2009	Scotland	15 – 21	Tonga
6 February 2009	South Africa	17 – 22	Kenya

=== Pool B ===
Team	Pld	W	D	L	PF	PA	+/-	Pts
New Zealand	3	2	0	1	86	54	+32	7
Wales	3	2	0	1	79	51	+28	7
Australia	3	2	0	1	65	58	+7	7
Niue	3	0	0	3	34	101	-67	3

Date	Team 1	Score	Team 2
6 February 2009	New Zealand	17 – 28	Wales
6 February 2009	Australia	22 – 17	Niue
6 February 2009	New Zealand	43 – 7	Niue
6 February 2009	Australia	24 – 15	Wales
6 February 2009	Wales	34 – 10	Niue
6 February 2009	New Zealand	26 – 19	Australia

=== Pool C ===
Team	Pld	W	D	L	PF	PA	+/-	Pts
Argentina	3	2	1	0	63	43	+20	8
England	3	2	0	1	65	30	+35	7
Canada	3	0	2	1	36	63	-27	5
France	3	0	1	2	43	71	-28	4

Date	Team 1	Score	Team 2
6 February 2009	England	26 – 10	France
6 February 2009	Argentina	17 – 17	Canada
6 February 2009	England	34 – 7	Canada
6 February 2009	Argentina	33 – 21	France
6 February 2009	France	12 – 12	Canada
6 February 2009	England	5 – 13	Argentina

=== Pool D ===
Team	Pld	W	D	L	PF	PA	+/-	Pts
Fiji	3	2	0	1	84	20	+64	7
United States	3	2	0	1	73	36	+37	7
Samoa	3	2	0	1	43	41	+2	7
Cook Islands	3	0	0	3	5	108	+103	3

Date	Team 1	Score	Team 2
6 February 2009	Fiji	10 – 15	United States
6 February 2009	Samoa	12 – 5	Cook Islands
6 February 2009	Fiji	55 – 0	Cook Islands
6 February 2009	Samoa	26 – 17	United States
6 February 2009	United States	41 – 0	Cook Islands
6 February 2009	Fiji	19 – 5	Samoa

== Knockout ==
=== Shield ===
Quarter-finals
7 February – Wellington, New Zealand
Tonga	19
Niue	0
7 February – Wellington, New Zealand
Samoa	7
France	27
7 February – Wellington, New Zealand
Canada	12
Cook Islands	33
7 February – Wellington, New Zealand
Australia	22
Scotland	12

Semi-finals
7 February – Wellington, New Zealand
Niue	21
Samoa	10
7 February – Wellington, New Zealand
Canada	7
Scotland	14

Final
7 February – Wellington, New Zealand
Niue	0
Scotland	26

=== Bowl ===
Quarter-finals
7 February – Wellington, New Zealand
Tonga	19
Niue	0
7 February – Wellington, New Zealand
Samoa	7
France	24
7 February – Wellington, New Zealand
Canada	12
Cook Islands	33
7 February – Wellington, New Zealand
Australia	22
Scotland	12

Semi-finals
7 February – Wellington, New Zealand
Tonga	12
France	5
7 February – Wellington, New Zealand
Cook Islands	28
Australia	10

Final
7 February – Wellington, New Zealand
Tonga	10
Cook Islands	24

=== Plate ===
Quarter-finals
7 February – Wellington, New Zealand
Kenya	10
Wales	7
7 February – Wellington, New Zealand
Fiji	10
England	37
7 February – Wellington, New Zealand
Argentina	24
United States	14
7 February – Wellington, New Zealand
New Zealand	7
South Africa	0

Semi-finals
7 February – Wellington, New Zealand
Wales	14
Fiji	12
7 February – Wellington, New Zealand
United States	0
South Africa	22

Final
7 February – Wellington, New Zealand
Wales	12
South Africa	26

=== Cup ===
Quarter-finals
7 February – Wellington, New Zealand
Kenya	10
Wales	7
7 February – Wellington, New Zealand
Fiji	10
England	31
7 February – Wellington, New Zealand
Argentina	24
United States	14
7 February – Wellington, New Zealand
New Zealand	7
South Africa	0

Semi-finals
7 February – Wellington, New Zealand
Kenya	0
England	26
7 February – Wellington, New Zealand
Argentina	7
New Zealand	10

Final
7 February – Wellington, New Zealand
England	19
New Zealand	17

== Statistics ==
=== Individual points ===
Individual points Updated:7 February 2009
Pos.	Player	Country	Points
1	Peni Rokodiva	Fiji	42
2	Ollie Phillips	England	35
3	Ben Gollings	England	34
4	Koiatu Koiatu	Cook Islands	33
5	Renfred Dazel	South Africa	31
6=	Shaun Foley	Australia	25
6=	Lucas González Amorosino	Argentina	25
6=	Chris Wyles	United States	25
6=	Collins Injera	Kenya	25
10	Colin Gregor	Scotland	24

=== Individual tries ===
Individual tries Updated:7 February 2009
Pos.	Player	Country	Tries
1	Ollie Phillips	England	7
2	Peni Rokodiva	Fiji	6
3=	Renfred Dazel	South Africa	5
3=	Shaun Foley	Australia	5
3=	Collins Injera	Kenya	5
3=	Chris Wyles	United States	5
7=	Jamal Brogan	Cook Islands	4
7=	Santiago Gomez Cora	Argentina	4
7=	Zar Lawrence	New Zealand	4
7=	Luke Morahan	Australia	4

Preceded by George Sevens	Wellington Sevens; 2009	Succeeded by San Diego Sevens
