= Innocent Simiyu =

Kenyan rugby union player

Innocent "Namcos" Simiyu (born 24 April 1983) is a Kenyan rugby union former player who captained the Kenya national rugby union team and the national rugby sevens team. In the World Rugby Sevens Series, Simiyu has represented Kenya in 121 matches scoring 321 points. At club level he played for Impala Saracens and Kenya Harlequin.

On 17 October 2016, he was appointed as head coach of the Kenya national rugby sevens team on a two-year contract and replacing Benjamin Ayimba.

Simiyu is a brother to former Kenya national rugby union players Victor Sudi and Nato Simiyu.
