= Simon Peter Odongo =

Kenyan rugby union player

Simon Odongo
- Full name: Simon Peter Odongo
- Born: Nairobi, Kenya
- Height: 1.80 m (5 ft 11 in)
- Weight: 85 kg (13 st 5 lb; 187 lb)

Rugby union career
- Position: Flyhalf / Center / Wing / Fullback
Senior career
Years	Team	Apps	(Points)
2007-2009	Mwamba RFC		
2009-2014	Homeboyz RFC		
Coaching career
- Years: Team
- 2014–2018: Homeboyz RFC (assistant coach)
- 2018-2019: Homeboyz RFC
- 2019-2020: Homeboyz RFC (assistant coach)
- 2021: Homeboyz RFC

Simon Odongo is a Kenyan rugby union coach and former player. He was born and grew up in Nairobi. His position as a player was Flyhalf / Center / Wing / Fullback and he played for Mwamba RFC, and Homeboyz RFC. He has been the Homeboyz head coach twice now 2018-2019 replacing Paul Murunga and 2021, replacing Jason Hector.

== Playing career ==
Odongo played his club rugby at Mwamba RFC after graduating from high school, where he played from 2007 to 2009. He eventually moved to Homeboyz RFC in 2009, which was formed the same year, and helped them win several titles before retiring in 2014 due to an ACL injury.

== Coaching career ==
Simon became the academy coach and assistant coach at Homeboyz Rugby Club in Nairobi, Kenya straight after retiring. He was the assistant coach to Paul Murunga and worked together with the late Benjamin Ayimba. In 2014 he helped establish a rugby team at Milimani Primary School where Homeboyz used to train. When Homeboyz shifted their base to Jamhuri Park, he continued coaching the academy and reserve team that was later promoted to the senior side.

Simon joined the Kings Rugby Development Academy as the Head coach in 2016 where he coached different age groups and earned some of his coaching badges. He is currently serving as the Director of Rugby.

After Paul Murunga got called up to the Kenya 7s team as an assistant coach for the 2015/16 HSBC sevens series and the Rio 2016 Summer Games, Odongo stepped in as the coach and under his guidance, Homeboyz went ahead and won the National 7's circuit in 2016. After working as the assistant coach of Homeboyz RFC for four years under, head coach Paul Murunga (2014–2018), Simon was appointed Homeboyz' head coach in 2018, when they won the Enterprise Cup Final and the overall National 7's Circuit.

In 2019, Simon coached the Homeboyz Rugby team in the Kenya Cup, where they failed to make the playoffs. He however led the reserve side to the Eric Shirley Shield Finals for the first time since the club was promoted.

South African, Jason Hector was then appointed head coach for the Homeboyz Rugby team for the 2019-2020 Kenya Rugby season with Simon slotting in as his assistant coach. However, the season was called off due to the COVID-19 pandemic and Jason left for his home country with Simon being appointed the Head Coach of Homeboyz Rugby in 2021.

== Honours ==
Player

- Eric Shirley Shield 2009, 2010
- Most serving Homeboyz player 2014

Manager

- Kenya National Sevens Circuit 2016
- Safari Sevens Bowl 2016
- Great Rift 10 A-side runners up 2018
- Eric Shirley Shield runners up 2018
