= 2008–09 IRB Sevens World Series =

International rugby sevens series

2008–09 IRB Sevens
- Series X
- Hosts: United Arab Emirates; South Africa; New Zealand; United States; Hong Kong; Australia; England; Scotland
- Date: 28 November 2008 – 31 May 2009
- Nations: 32

Final positions
- Champions: South Africa
- Runners-up: Fiji
- Third: England

Series details
- Top try scorer: (Kenya) Collins Injera
- Top point scorer: (England) Ben Gollings

The 2008–09 IRB Sevens World Series was the tenth of an annual IRB Sevens World Series of rugby union sevens tournaments for full national sides run by the International Rugby Board since 1999–2000.

South Africa clinched the 2008–09 World Series, its first Series title. The defending series champions New Zealand finished fourth.

Sevens is traditionally played in a two-day tournament format. However, the most famous event, the Hong Kong Sevens, is played over three days, largely because it involves 24 teams instead of the normal 16. Starting in 2008–09, the Australia leg (which involves the normal 16 teams) was spread out over a three-day period.

== Tournaments ==
The series' tournaments are identical to 2007–2008 and span the globe:

2008-09 Itinerary
Leg	Venue	Date	Winner
Dubai	The Sevens	November 28–29, 2008	South Africa
South Africa	Outeniqua Park, George	December 5–6, 2008	South Africa
New Zealand	Westpac Stadium, Wellington	February 6–7, 2009	England
United States	Petco Park, San Diego	February 14–15, 2009	Argentina
Hong Kong	Hong Kong Stadium	March 27–29, 2009	Fiji
Australia	Adelaide Oval, Adelaide	April 3–5, 2009	South Africa
London	Twickenham	May 23–24, 2009	England
Scotland	Murrayfield, Edinburgh	May 30–31, 2009	Fiji

The 2009 Rugby World Cup Sevens was not a part of the 2008-09 series. Unlike the 2005 edition held in Hong Kong, the 2009 edition did not replace one of the 2008-09 series events. The World Cup was held in Dubai from March 5–7, 2009 and won by Wales.

== Core teams ==
Prior to the season, the IRB announced the 12 "core teams" that would receive guaranteed berths in each event in the 2008–09 series:

- Argentina
- Australia
- England
- France
- Fiji
- Kenya
- New Zealand
- Samoa
- Scotland
- South Africa
- United States
- Wales

The one new core team was the USA, which replaced its neighbor Canada.

== Points schedule ==
The season championship is determined by points earned in each tournament. For most events, points are awarded on the following schedule:

- Cup winner (1st place): 20 points
- Cup runner-up (2nd place): 16 points
- Losing Cup semifinalists (3rd & 4th place): 12 points
- Plate winner (5th place): 8 points
- Plate runner-up (6th place): 6 points
- Losing Plate semifinalists (7th & 8th place): 4 points
- Bowl winner (9th place): 2 points

Points are awarded on a different schedule for the Hong Kong Sevens:

- Cup winner (1st place): 30 points
- Cup runner-up (2nd place): 24 points
- Losing Cup semifinalists (3rd & 4th place): 18 points
- Losing Cup quarterfinalists (5th, 6th, 7th & 8th place): 8 points
- Plate winner (9th place): 4 points
- Plate runner-up (10th place): 3 points
- Losing Plate semifinalists (11th & 12th place): 2 points
- Bowl winner (17th place): 1 point

== Tournament structure ==
In all tournaments except Hong Kong, 16 teams participate. Due to its place as the sports most prestigious annual event, the Hong Kong tournament has 24 teams. In each tournament, the teams are divided into pools of four teams, who play a round-robin within the pool. Points are awarded in each pool on a different schedule from most rugby tournaments–3 for a win, 2 for a draw, 1 for a loss. The first tiebreaker is the head-to-head result between the tied teams, followed by difference in points scored during the tournament.

Four trophies are awarded in each tournament, except for Hong Kong. In descending order of prestige, they are the Cup, whose winner is the overall tournament champion, Plate, Bowl and Shield. In Hong Kong, the Shield is not awarded. Each trophy is awarded at the end of a knockout tournament.

In a 16 team tournament, the top two teams in each pool advance to the Cup competition. The four quarterfinal losers drop into the bracket for the Plate. The Bowl is contested by the third-place finishers in each pool, while the Shield is contested by the last-place teams from each pool. In Hong Kong, the six pool winners, plus the two highest-finishing second-place teams, advance to the Cup. The Plate participants are the eight highest-ranked teams remaining, while the lowest eight drop to the Bowl.

== Final standings ==
The points awarded to teams at each event, as well as the overall season totals, are shown in the table below. Gold indicates the event champions. Silver indicates the event runner-ups. A zero (0) is recorded in the event column where a team competed in a tournament but did not gain any points. A dash (–) is recorded in the event column if a team did not compete at a tournament.

2008–09 IRB Sevens – Series X
Pos.	Event Team	Dubai	George	Wellington	San Diego	Hong Kong	Adelaide	London	Edinburgh	Points total
1	South Africa	20	20	8	12	24	20	12	16	132
2	Fiji	12	12	4	4	30	12	8	20	102
3	England	16	8	20	16	8	8	20	2	98
4	New Zealand	12	16	16	8	8	4	16	8	88
5	Argentina	4	12	12	20	8	12	0	0	68
6	Kenya	6	0	12	6	18	16	2	4	64
7	Samoa	8	4	0	4	18	2	0	4	40
8	Australia	4	0	0	2	8	6	4	6	30
9=	Scotland	0	0	0	0	0	0	12	12	24
9=	Wales	0	0	6	0	2	4	0	12	24
11	United States	0	4	4	12	0	0	0	0	20
12	Portugal	2	6	-	-	1	0	6	0	15
13	France	0	2	0	0	2	0	4	0	8
14	Tonga	-	-	0	-	4	0	-	-	4
15	Canada	-	-	0	0	3	-	0	0	3
16	Cook Islands	-	-	2	-	-	0	-	-	2
N/A	Zimbabwe	0	0	-	-	0	-	-	-	0
N/A	Japan	-	-	-	0	0	0	-	-	0
N/A	(Cooperation Council for the Arab States of the Gulf) Arabian Gulf	0	-	-	-	-	-	-	-	0
N/A	Georgia	0	0	-	-	-	-	0	0	0
N/A	Germany	-	-	-	-	-	-	0	-	0
N/A	Niue	-	-	0	-	-	-	-	-	0
N/A	Mexico	-	-	-	0	-	-	-	-	0
N/A	Tunisia	-	0	-	-	-	-	-	-	0
N/A	Uruguay	-	-	-	0	0	-	-	-	0
N/A	West Indies	-	-	-	-	0	-	-	-	0
N/A	Hong Kong	-	-	-	-	0	-	-	-	0
N/A	China	-	-	-	-	0	-	-	-	0
N/A	Sri Lanka	-	-	-	-	0	-	-	-	0
N/A	Chinese Taipei	-	-	-	-	0	-	-	-	0
N/A	South Korea	-	-	-	-	0	-	-	-	0
N/A	Spain	-	-	-	-	-	-	-	0	0

Legend
Gold	Event Champions
Silver	Event Runner-ups
Light blue line on the left indicates a core team eligible to participate in all events of the series.

== Player statistics ==
=== Most points ===
Individual points
Pos.	Player	Country	Points
1	Ben Gollings	England	260
2	Collins Injera	Kenya	210
3	Richard Kingi	Australia	205
4	Renfred Dazel	South Africa	191
5	Lolo Lui	Samoa	187
6	Tomasi Cama	New Zealand	174
7	Pedro Leal	Portugal	168
8	Lavin Asego	Kenya	166
9	Paul Albaladejo	France	165
=10	Ollie Phillips	England	161
=10	Mzwandile Stick	South Africa	161

=== Most tries ===
Individual tries
Pos.	Player	Country	Tries
1	Collins Injera	Kenya	42
2=	Rayno Benjamin	South Africa	28
2=	Santiago Gomez Cora	Argentina	28
4	Luke Morahan	Australia	27
5	Vereniki Goneva	Fiji	24
6	Ollie Phillips	England	23
7=	Alafoti Fa'osiliva	Samoa	22
7=	Renfred Dazel	South Africa	22
7=	Robert Ebersohn	South Africa	22
7=	Pio Tuwai	Fiji	22
7=	Vuyo Zangqa	South Africa	22

== Tournaments ==
=== Dubai ===
Event	Winners	Score	Finalists	Semi Finalists
Cup	South Africa	19 – 12	England	New Zealand; Fiji
Plate	Samoa	12 – 7	Kenya	Argentina; Australia
Bowl	Portugal	24 – 0	France	Wales; Zimbabwe
Shield	United States	31 – 7	Arabian Gulf	Georgia; Scotland

=== South Africa ===
Event	Winners	Score	Finalists	Semi Finalists
Cup	South Africa	12 – 7	New Zealand	Argentina; Fiji
Plate	England	24 – 7	Portugal	Samoa; United States
Bowl	France	21 – 12	Australia	Kenya; Wales
Shield	Zimbabwe	26 – 0	Scotland	Georgia; Tunisia

=== New Zealand ===
Event	Winners	Score	Finalists	Semi Finalists
Cup	England	19 – 17	New Zealand	Argentina; Kenya
Plate	South Africa	26 – 12	Wales	Fiji; United States
Bowl	Cook Islands	24 – 10	Tonga	France; Australia
Shield	Scotland	24 – 0	Niue	Samoa; Canada

=== United States ===
Event	Winners	Score	Finalists	Semi Finalists
Cup	Argentina	19 – 14	England	South Africa; United States
Plate	New Zealand	22 – 7	Kenya	Fiji; Samoa
Bowl	Australia	40 – 0	France	Scotland; Wales
Shield	Canada	31 – 7	Uruguay	Mexico; Japan

=== Hong Kong ===
Event	Winners	Score	Finalists	Semi Finalists	Quarter Finalists
Cup	Fiji	26 – 24	South Africa	Kenya; Samoa	England; New Zealand; Argentina; Australia
Plate	Tonga	14 – 12	Canada	Wales; France	United States; Hong Kong; Scotland; South Korea
Bowl	Portugal	14 – 12	Uruguay	Zimbabwe; Japan	Chinese Taipei; West Indies; China; Sri Lanka

=== Australia ===
Event	Winners	Score	Finalists	Semi Finalists
Cup	South Africa	26 – 7	Kenya	Argentina; Fiji
Plate	England	24 – 19	Australia	Wales; New Zealand
Bowl	Samoa	35 – 14	France	Tonga; Cook Islands
Shield	United States	24 – 21	Scotland	Japan; Portugal

=== London ===
Event	Winners	Score	Finalists	Semi Finalists
Cup	England	31 – 26	New Zealand	Scotland; South Africa
Plate	Fiji	24 – 10	Portugal	France; Australia
Bowl	Kenya	12 – 7	Wales	Samoa; Argentina
Shield	Canada	27 – 7	United States	Germany; Georgia

=== Scotland ===
Event	Winners	Score	Finalists	Semi Finalists
Cup	Fiji	20 – 19	South Africa	Scotland; Wales
Plate	New Zealand	34 – 12	Australia	Samoa; Kenya
Bowl	England	26 – 15	France	Argentina; Portugal
Shield	United States	12 – 10	Canada	Georgia; Spain
