= Humphrey Kayange =

Kenya international rugby union player

- Born: 20 July 1982 (age 44) Nairobi, Kenya
- Height: 1.98 m (6 ft 6 in)
- Weight: 105.3 kg (232 lb)
- School: St. Peter's Mumias High School
- University: Jomo Kenyatta University
- Notable relative(s): Collins Injera (brother); Michael Agevi (brother)

Rugby union career
- Position: Centre
- Current team: Mwamba RFC
Amateur team(s)
Years	Team	Apps	(Points)
- Mwamba RFC
International career
Years	Team	Apps	(Points)
2005–17	Kenya	18	(30)
National sevens team
Years	Team		Comps
2003–16	Kenya 7s		49
- Correct as of 7 December 2009

Humphrey Kayange (born 20 July 1982) is a Kenyan former rugby union player and organic chemist. Kayange is known within the rugby sevens community, as he has produced some of the best performances for the Kenya national sevens side. He is a former captain of the team. He is a member of the International Olympic Committee (IOC).

In April 2025, Kayange was appointed to be the new Chair of the IOC Coordination Commission for the 4th Summer Youth Olympic Games, to be held in Dakar in 2026. The appointment was made by Thomas Bach, who is the IOC President.

== Career ==
Kayange played for the military team Ulinzi RFC in the Kenya Cup league. The team was later disbanded, and he moved to Mwamba RFC. He was part of the Kenyan squad at the 2009 Rugby World Cup Sevens, reaching the semifinals. He was nominated for IRB Sevens Player of the Year in 2009. Kayange has also played for the Kenya national rugby union team (15s), playing at the 2011 World Cup Qualifiers. He is the older brother of IRB Sevens World Series top try scorer Collins Injera who also plays for Mwamba RFC. Their younger brother Michael Agevi has also played rugby for the Sevens in the past.

In 2010 Kayange was awarded the presidential Order of Golden Warriors (OGW) alongside his brother Collins Injera, for their performance in the 2008/2009 IRB world series.

In 2012 Kayange moved to Bristol, U.K. to undertake research into tenellin biosynthesis with Professor Christine L. Willis at the University of Bristol.

Kayange announced his retirement in October 2016 from the Kenyan rugby sevens team at the age of 34.

Humphrey Kayange's representative duties, away from the field over the years, have been as follows:

- Executive Committee and Foundation Board Member of the World Anti-Doping Agency
- Male Athletes Representative NOC- Kenya
- Board Member, Kenya Academy of Sports Council
- Board Director- National Squads (Shujaa), Kenya Rugby Union
- Secretary General, Mwamba Rugby Football Club

== Honors ==
In 2021, World Rugby inducted Kayange into its World Rugby Hall of Fame, alongside Osea Kolinisau, Huriana Manuel, Cheryl McAfee, Will Carling and Jim Telfer.
