= 2008 South Africa Sevens =

The Emirates Airlines South Africa Sevens is played annually as part of the IRB Sevens World Series for international rugby sevens (seven-a-side version of rugby union). The 2008 competition, took place on 5 December and 6 December at Outeniqua Park in George, Western Cape, it was the second Cup trophy in the 2008–09 IRB Sevens World Series.

== Teams ==
- Argentina
- Australia
- England
- France
- Fiji
- Georgia
- Kenya
- New Zealand
- Portugal
- Samoa
- Scotland
- South Africa
- Tunisia
- United States
- Wales
- Zimbabwe

== Pool stages ==
=== Pool A ===
Team	Pld	W	D	L	PF	PA	+/-	Pts
New Zealand	3	3	0	0	95	12	+83	9
England	3	2	0	1	70	33	+37	7
France	3	1	0	2	31	75	−44	5
Tunisia	3	0	0	3	21	97	−66	3

Date	Team 1	Score	Team 2
5 December 2008	New Zealand	40–5	France
5 December 2008	England	42–7	Tunisia
5 December 2008	New Zealand	36–0	Tunisia
5 December 2008	England	21–7	France
5 December 2008	France	19–14	Tunisia
5 December 2008	New Zealand	19–7	England

=== Pool B ===
Team	Pld	W	D	L	PF	PA	+/-	Pts
South Africa	3	3	0	0	72	12	+60	9
United States	3	2	0	1	66	50	+16	7
Australia	3	1	0	2	59	50	+9	5
Georgia	3	0	0	3	10	95	−85	3

Date	Team 1	Score	Team 2
5 December 2008	South Africa	24–0	United States
5 December 2008	Australia	26–5	Georgia
5 December 2008	South Africa	31–5	Georgia
5 December 2008	Australia	26–28	United States
5 December 2008	United States	38–0	Georgia
5 December 2008	South Africa	17–7	Australia

=== Pool C ===
Team	Pld	W	D	L	PF	PA	+/-	Pts
Fiji	3	3	0	0	81	21	+60	9
Argentina	3	2	0	1	47	38	+9	7
Zimbabwe	3	1	0	2	43	57	−14	5
Scotland	3	0	0	3	7	62	−55	3

Date	Team 1	Score	Team 2
5 December 2008	Fiji	31–0	Scotland
5 December 2008	Argentina	26–12	Zimbabwe
5 December 2008	Fiji	24–14	Zimbabwe
5 December 2008	Argentina	14–0	Scotland
5 December 2008	Scotland	7–17	Zimbabwe
5 December 2008	Fiji	26–17	Argentina

=== Pool D ===
Team	Pld	W	D	L	PF	PA	+/-	Pts
Portugal	3	3	0	0	52	46	+6	9
Samoa	3	2	0	1	65	36	+29	7
Kenya	3	1	0	2	43	43	0	5
Wales	3	0	0	3	34	69	−35	3

Date	Team 1	Score	Team 2
5 December 2008	Samoa	31–5	Wales
5 December 2008	Kenya	12–14	Portugal
5 December 2008	Samoa	17–19	Portugal
5 December 2008	Kenya	19–12	Wales
5 December 2008	Wales	17–19	Portugal
5 December 2008	Samoa	17–12	Kenya

== Knockout ==
=== Shield ===
Quarter-finals
6 December – Outeniqua Park, George, Western Cape
France	26
Georgia	14
6 December – Outeniqua Park, George, Western Cape
Kenya	19
Scotland	15
6 December – Outeniqua Park, George, Western Cape
Zimbabwe	24
Wales	26
6 December – Outeniqua Park, George, Western Cape
Australia	33
Tunisia	21

Semi-finals
6 December – Outeniqua Park, George, Western Cape
Georgia	12
Scotland	17
6 December – Outeniqua Park, George, Western Cape
Zimbabwe	40
Tunisia	5

Final
6 December – Outeniqua Park, George, Western Cape
Scotland	0
Zimbabwe	26

=== Bowl ===
Quarter-finals
6 December – Outeniqua Park, George, Western Cape
France	26
Georgia	14
6 December – Outeniqua Park, George, Western Cape
Kenya	19
Scotland	15
6 December – Outeniqua Park, George, Western Cape
Zimbabwe	24
Wales	26
6 December – Outeniqua Park, George, Western Cape
Australia	33
Tunisia	21

Semi-finals
6 December – Outeniqua Park, George, Western Cape
France	19
Kenya	14
6 December – Outeniqua Park, George, Western Cape
Wales	19
Australia	22

Final
6 December – Outeniqua Park, George, Western Cape
France	21
Australia	12

=== Plate ===
Quarter-finals
6 December – Outeniqua Park, George, Western Cape
New Zealand	36
United States	7
6 December – Outeniqua Park, George, Western Cape
Portugal	19
Argentina	28
6 December – Outeniqua Park, George, Western Cape
Fiji	19
Samoa	12
6 December – Outeniqua Park, George, Western Cape
South Africa	17
England	12

Semi-finals
6 December – Outeniqua Park, George, Western Cape
United States	7
Portugal	24
6 December – Outeniqua Park, George, Western Cape
Samoa	19
England	20

Final
6 December – Outeniqua Park, George, Western Cape
Portugal	7
England	24

=== Cup ===
Quarter-finals
6 December – Outeniqua Park, George, Western Cape
New Zealand	36
United States	7
6 December – Outeniqua Park, George, Western Cape
Portugal	19
Argentina	28
6 December – Outeniqua Park, George, Western Cape
Fiji	19
Samoa	12
6 December – Outeniqua Park, George, Western Cape
South Africa	17
England	12

Semi-finals
6 December – Outeniqua Park, George, Western Cape
New Zealand	26
Argentina	5
6 December – Outeniqua Park, George, Western Cape
Fiji	7
South Africa	21

Final
6 December – Outeniqua Park, George, Western Cape
New Zealand	7
South Africa	12

== Statistics ==
=== Individual points ===
Individual points Updated:6 December 2008
Pos.	Player	Country	Points
1	Tomasi Cama	New Zealand	59
2	Richard Kingi	Australia	51
3	Ben Gollings	England	41
4=	Gonzalo Comacho	Argentina	35
4=	Luke Morahan	Australia	35
4=	Mickey Young	England	35
4=	Tangai Nemadire	Zimbabwe	35
8	Paul Albaladejo	France	34
9	Pedro Leal	Portugal	32
10	Gerald Sibanda	Zimbabwe	30

=== Individual tries ===
Individual tries Updated:6 December 2008
Pos.	Player	Country	Tries
1=	Gonzalo Camacho	Argentina	7
1=	Luke Morahan	Australia	7
1=	Mickey Young	England	7
4	Gerald Sibanda	Zimbabwe	6
5=	Tomasi Cama	New Zealand	5
5=	Robert Ebersohn	South Africa	5
5=	Richard Kingi	Australia	5
5=	David Mateus	Portugal	5
5=	Tangai Nemadire	Zimbabwe	5
10	Paul Albaladejo	France	4

Preceded by Dubai Sevens	George Sevens; 2008	Succeeded by Wellington Sevens
