= 2009 Edinburgh Sevens =

Rugby sevens tournament

The Edinburgh Sevens is played annually as part of the IRB Sevens World Series for international rugby sevens (seven-a-side version of rugby union). The 2009 competition, which took place on 30 May and 31 May in Edinburgh, Scotland, was the eighth and final Cup trophy in the 2008–09 IRB Sevens World Series.

On the first day of the competition, South Africa advanced to the quarterfinals of the Cup competition, thereby assuring them of the overall season title; they needed only to finish within the top nine teams to make it impossible for second-place England to catch them on the season log. South Africa went on advance to the Cup finals, where they were defeated 20–19 by Fiji, who passed England for second place on the season log in the process. Last year's series champions New Zealand won the second-level Plate competition, with England winning the Bowl and the USA winning the Shield.

== Format ==
The tournament features four round-robin pools, each comprising four teams. All 16 teams advance to the knockout stage. The top two teams from each pool proceed to the quarter-finals of the main competition. The winners of these quarter-finals advance to the Cup semi-finals, while the losers enter the Plate semi-finals. The bottom two teams from each pool move on to the quarter-finals of the consolation competition. The winners of these quarter-finals continue to the Bowl semi-finals, and the losers proceed to the Shield semi-finals.

== Teams ==
- Argentina
- Australia
- Canada
- England
- France
- Fiji
- Georgia
- Kenya
- New Zealand
- Portugal
- Samoa
- Scotland
- South Africa
- Spain
- United States
- Wales

== Pool stages ==
=== Pool A ===
Team	Pld	W	D	L	PF	PA	+/-	Pts
South Africa	3	3	0	0	81	27	+54	9
New Zealand	3	2	0	1	63	24	+39	7
France	3	1	0	2	41	60	-19	5
United States	3	0	0	3	15	89	-74	3

Date	Team 1	Score	Team 2
2009-05-30 9:35	South Africa	33 – 10	France
2009-05-30 9:57	New Zealand	29 – 5	United States
2009-05-30 13:01	South Africa	34 – 5	United States
2009-05-30 13:23	New Zealand	22 – 5	France
2009-05-30 15:57	France	26 – 5	United States
2009-05-30 17:28	South Africa	14 – 12	New Zealand

=== Pool B ===
Team	Pld	W	D	L	PF	PA	+/-	Pts
Fiji	3	3	0	0	107	26	+81	9
Australia	3	2	0	1	72	33	+39	7
Portugal	3	1	0	2	40	80	-40	5
Spain	3	0	0	3	7	54	-90	3

Date	Team 1	Score	Team 2
2009-05-30 11:03	Fiji	41 – 7	Portugal
2009-05-30 11:25	Australia	24 – 7	Spain
2009-05-30 14:29	Fiji	40 – 0	Spain
2009-05-30 14:51	Australia	29 – 0	Portugal
2009-05-30 16:19	Portugal	33 – 10	Spain
2009-05-30 18:34	Fiji	26 – 19	Australia

=== Pool C ===
Team	Pld	W	D	L	PF	PA	+/-	Pts
Kenya	3	3	0	0	78	31	+47	9
Scotland	3	2	0	1	66	44	+22	7
England	3	1	0	2	57	66	-9	5
Canada	3	0	0	3	17	87	-70	3

Date	Team 1	Score	Team 2
2009-05-30 11:47	Kenya	35 – 0	Canada
2009-05-30 12:09	England	17 – 33	Scotland
2009-05-30 15:13	Kenya	22 – 17	Scotland
2009-05-30 15:35	England	26 – 12	Canada
2009-05-30 17:50	England	14 – 21	Kenya
2009-05-30 18:56	Canada	5 – 26	Scotland

=== Pool D ===
Team	Pld	W	D	L	PF	PA	+/-	Pts
Samoa	3	3	0	0	101	28	+73	9
Wales	3	2	0	1	83	45	+38	7
Argentina	3	1	0	2	78	61	+17	5
Georgia	3	0	0	3	14	142	-128	3

Date	Team 1	Score	Team 2
2009-05-30 10:19	Argentina	17 – 19	Wales
2009-05-30 10:41	Samoa	38 – 7	Georgia
2009-05-30 13:45	Argentina	54 – 0	Georgia
2009-05-30 14:07	Samoa	21 – 14	Wales
2009-05-30 16:41	Wales	50 – 7	Georgia
2009-05-30 18:12	Argentina	7 – 42	Samoa

== Knockout ==
=== Shield ===
Quarter-finals
31 May – Edinburgh, Scotland
Spain	12
France	28
31 May – Edinburgh, Scotland
Argentina	14
Canada	7
31 May – Edinburgh, Scotland
England	31
Georgia	7
31 May – Edinburgh, Scotland
Portugal	26
United States	5

Semi-finals
31 May – Edinburgh, Scotland
Spain	19
Canada	21
31 May – Edinburgh, Scotland
Georgia	0
United States	27

Final
31 May – Edinburgh, Scotland
Canada	10
United States	12

=== Bowl ===
Quarter-finals
31 May – Edinburgh, Scotland
Spain	12
France	28
31 May – Edinburgh, Scotland
Argentina	14
Canada	7
31 May – Edinburgh, Scotland
England	31
Georgia	7
31 May – Edinburgh, Scotland
Portugal	26
United States	5

Semi-finals
31 May – Edinburgh, Scotland
France	19
Argentina	12
31 May – Edinburgh, Scotland
England	31
Portugal	7

Final
31 May – Edinburgh, Scotland
France	15
England	26

=== Plate ===
Quarter-finals
31 May – Edinburgh, Scotland
South Africa	17
Australia	7
31 May – Edinburgh, Scotland
Samoa	12
Scotland	14
31 May – Edinburgh, Scotland
Kenya	7
Wales	19
31 May – Edinburgh, Scotland
Fiji	26
New Zealand	19

Semi-finals
31 May – Edinburgh, Scotland
Australia	26
Samoa	14
31 May – Edinburgh, Scotland
Kenya	21
New Zealand	26

Final
31 May – Edinburgh, Scotland
Australia	12
New Zealand	34

=== Cup ===
Quarter-finals
31 May – Edinburgh, Scotland
South Africa	17
Australia	7
31 May – Edinburgh, Scotland
Samoa	12
Scotland	14
31 May – Edinburgh, Scotland
Kenya	7
Wales	19
31 May – Edinburgh, Scotland
Fiji	26
New Zealand	19

Semi-finals
31 May – Edinburgh, Scotland
South Africa	26
Scotland	21
31 May – Edinburgh, Scotland
Wales	14
Fiji	28

Final
31 May – Edinburgh, Scotland
South Africa	19
Fiji	20

Preceded by London Sevens	Edinburgh Sevens; 2009	Succeeded by Dubai Sevens
