= 2009 Hong Kong Sevens =

International rugby sevens tournament

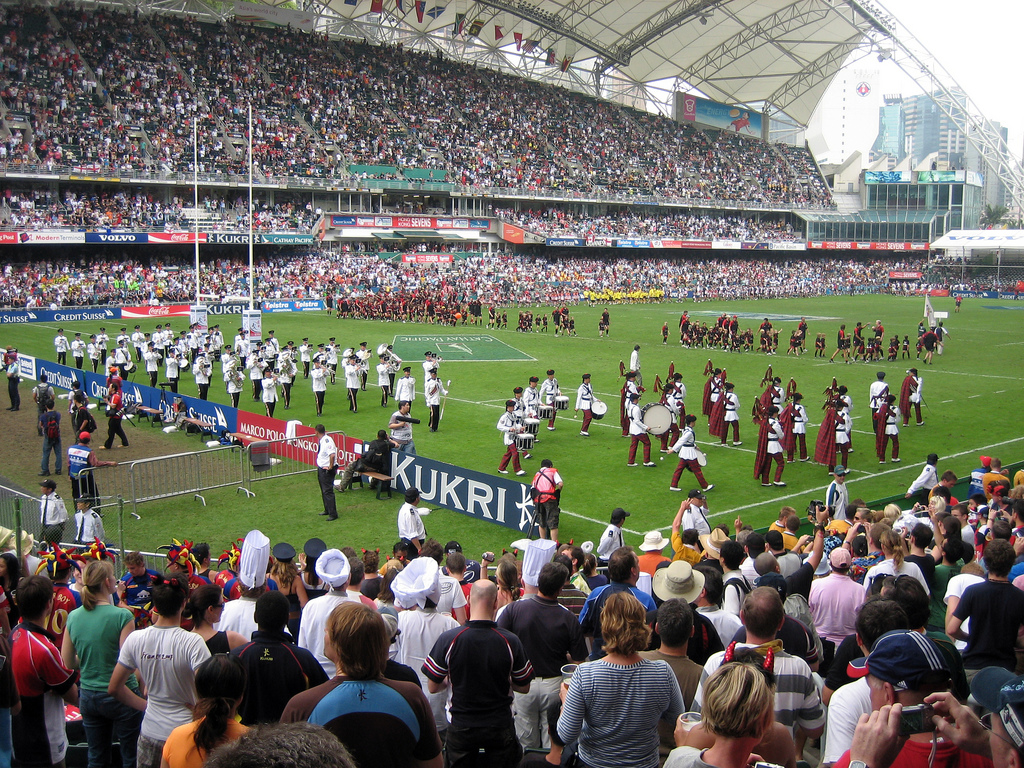
Hong Kong Sevens Parade

The Hong Kong Sevens, referred to as the Cathay Pacific Credit Suisse Hong Kong Sevens for sponsorship reasons, is the 5th stop on the IRB Sevens World Series. The 2009 event was played between the 27–29 March, and was won by Fiji. Unlike the 7 other tournaments, Hong Kong contains 24 teams to compete.

== Teams ==
- Argentina
- Australia
- Canada
- China
- Chinese Taipei
- England
- Fiji
- France
- Hong Kong
- Japan
- Kenya
- South Korea
- New Zealand
- Portugal
- Samoa
- Scotland
- South Africa
- Sri Lanka
- Tonga
- Uruguay
- United States
- Wales
- West Indies
- Zimbabwe

== Pool Stages ==
=== Pool A ===
Pos	Team	Pld	W	D	L	PF	PA	PD	Pts
1	South Africa	3	3	0	0	108	19	+89	9
2	France	3	2	0	1	53	36	+17	7
3	South Korea	3	1	0	2	47	63	−16	5
4	Uruguay	3	0	0	3	15	105	−90	3

Date	Team 1	Score	Team 2
2009-03-27	South Africa	29 - 7	South Korea
2009-03-27	France	17 - 5	Uruguay
2009-03-28	France	24 - 5	South Korea
2009-03-28	South Africa	53 - 0	Uruguay
2009-03-28	Uruguay	10 - 35	South Korea
2009-03-28	South Africa	26 - 12	France

=== Pool B ===
Pos	Team	Pld	W	D	L	PF	PA	PD	Pts
1	England	3	3	0	0	130	19	+111	9
2	Wales	3	2	0	1	52	48	+4	7
3	Japan	3	1	0	2	26	81	−55	5
4	China	3	0	0	3	34	94	−60	3

Date	Team 1	Score	Team 2
2009-03-27	England	54 - 0	China
2009-03-27	Wales	14 - 5	Japan
2009-03-28	Wales	19 - 17	China
2009-03-28	England	50 - 0	Japan
2009-03-28	Japan	21 - 17	China
2009-03-28	England	26 - 19	Wales

=== Pool C ===
Pos	Team	Pld	W	D	L	PF	PA	PD	Pts
1	New Zealand	3	3	0	0	128	5	+123	9
2	Australia	3	2	0	1	94	34	+60	7
3	Zimbabwe	3	1	0	2	38	99	−61	5
4	Sri Lanka	3	0	0	3	26	148	−122	3

Date	Team 1	Score	Team 2
2009-03-27	New Zealand	59 - 0	Sri Lanka
2009-03-27	Australia	33 - 5	Zimbabwe
2009-03-28	Australia	56 - 12	Sri Lanka
2009-03-28	New Zealand	52 - 0	Zimbabwe
2009-03-28	Zimbabwe	33 - 14	Sri Lanka
2009-03-28	New Zealand	17 - 5	Australia

=== Pool D ===
Pos	Team	Pld	W	D	L	PF	PA	PD	Pts
1	Argentina	3	3	0	0	72	31	+41	9
2	Hong Kong	3	2	0	1	38	47	−9	7
3	Tonga	3	1	0	2	46	41	+5	5
4	Portugal	3	0	0	3	26	63	−37	3

Date	Team 1	Score	Team 2
2009-03-27	Argentina	28 - 0	Hong Kong
2009-03-27	Portugal	5 - 17	Tonga
2009-03-28	Portugal	7 - 24	Hong Kong
2009-03-28	Argentina	22 - 17	Tonga
2009-03-28	Tonga	12 - 14	Hong Kong
2009-03-28	Argentina	22 - 14	Portugal

=== Pool E ===
Pos	Team	Pld	W	D	L	PF	PA	PD	Pts
1	Samoa	3	2	1	0	76	22	+54	8
2	Fiji	3	2	1	0	71	29	+42	8
3	Canada	3	1	0	2	49	47	+2	5
4	Chinese Taipei	3	0	0	3	7	105	−98	3

Date	Team 1	Score	Team 2
2009-03-27	Fiji	33 - 0	Chinese Taipei
2009-03-27	Samoa	14 - 10	Canada
2009-03-28	Samoa	50 - 0	Chinese Taipei
2009-03-28	Fiji	26 - 17	Canada
2009-03-28	Canada	22 - 7	Chinese Taipei
2009-03-28	Fiji	12 - 12	Samoa

=== Pool F ===
Pos	Team	Pld	W	D	L	PF	PA	PD	Pts
1	Kenya	3	3	0	0	67	29	+38	9
2	Scotland	3	2	0	1	45	65	−20	7
3	United States	3	1	0	2	46	45	+1	5
4	West Indies	3	0	0	3	34	53	−19	3

Date	Team 1	Score	Team 2
2009-03-27	Kenya	17 - 10	West Indies
2009-03-27	United States	17 - 19	Scotland
2009-03-28	United States	17 - 7	West Indies
2009-03-28	Kenya	31 - 7	Scotland
2009-03-28	Scotland	19 - 17	West Indies
2009-03-28	Kenya	19 - 12	United States

== Knockout ==
=== Bowl ===
Quarter-finals
March 29 - Hong Kong
Japan	26
Sri Lanka	10
March 29 - Hong Kong
China	5
Portugal	33
March 29 - Hong Kong
West Indies	12
Uruguay	21
March 29 - Hong Kong
Chinese Taipei	14
Zimbabwe	40

Semi-finals
March 29 - Hong Kong
Japan	10
Portugal	26
March 29 - Hong Kong
Uruguay	28
Zimbabwe	14

Final
March 29 - Hong Kong
Portugal	14
Uruguay	12

=== Plate ===
Quarter-finals
March 29 - Hong Kong
France	17
South Korea	7
March 29 - Hong Kong
Tonga	29
Scotland	0
March 29 - Hong Kong
Hong Kong	5
Canada	26
March 29 - Hong Kong
United States	21
Wales	22

Semi-finals
March 29 - Hong Kong
France	10
Tonga	19
March 29 - Hong Kong
Canada	19
Wales	10

Final
March 29 - Hong Kong
Tonga	14
Canada	12

=== Cup ===
Quarter-finals
March 29 - Hong Kong
South Africa	24
Australia	10
March 29 - Hong Kong
Samoa	15
Argentina	12
March 29 - Hong Kong
New Zealand	7
Kenya	10
March 29 - Hong Kong
Fiji	10
England	7

Semi-finals
March 29 - Hong Kong
South Africa	29
Samoa	3
March 29 - Hong Kong
Kenya	7
Fiji	24

Final
March 29 - Hong Kong
South Africa	24
Fiji	26

== Standings after Tournament ==
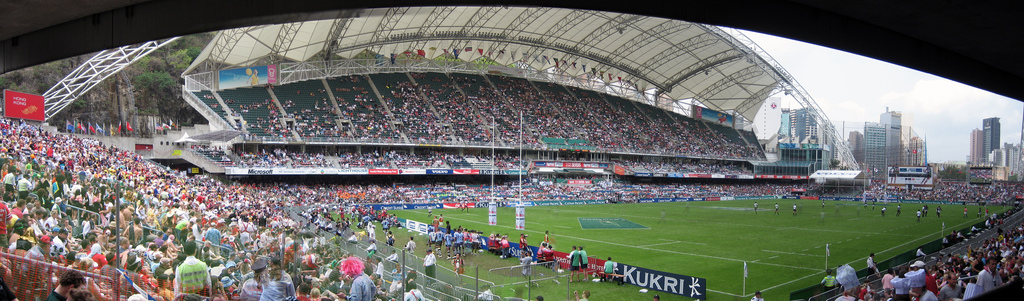
Hong Kong Stadium

South Africa, who finished second in this tournament, went to the top of the IRB Sevens World Series. England, who were joint-first with South Africa before, dropped to second place, with Fiji going to third and New Zealand fourth.

== Statistics ==
=== Individual points ===
Individual points Updated:2009-03-29
Pos.	Player	Country	Points
1	Phillip Mack	Canada	41
2	Pedro Leal	Portugal	39
3	Vuyo Zangga	South Africa	33
4	Sosaia Palei	Tonga	32
5=	Pio Tuwai	Fiji	30
5=	Robert Ebersohn	South Africa	30
6	Richard Kingi	Australia	29
7	Emosi Vucago	Fiji	28
9=	Mzwandile Stick	South Africa	26
9=	Renfred Dazel	South Africa	26

=== Individual tries ===
Individual tries Updated:2009-03-29
Pos.	Player	Country	Tries
1=	Robert Ebersohn	South Africa	6
1=	Sosaia Palei	Tonga	6
3=	Pio Tuwai	Fiji	5
3=	Rayno Benjamin	South Africa	5
3=	Seremaia Burotu	Fiji	5
3=	Ifan Evans	Wales	5
3=	Collins Injera	Kenya	5
3=	Ualosi Kailea	Tonga	5
3=	Philip Mack	Canada	5
3=	Joao Mirra	Portugal	5

Preceded by San Diego Sevens	Hong Kong Sevens; 2009	Succeeded by Adelaide Sevens
