= 2009 London Sevens =

The London Sevens is played annually as part of the IRB Sevens World Series for international rugby sevens (seven-a-side version of rugby union). The 2009 competition took place on 23 and 24 May in London, England, and was the seventh Cup trophy in the 2008-09 IRB Sevens World Series. England won the most prestigious Cup trophy, with an extra time 31-26 victory over New Zealand; Fiji won the Plate trophy, Kenya won the Bowl trophy, and Canada won the Shield trophy.

== Format ==
The tournament consists of four round-robin pools of four teams. All sixteen teams progress to the knockout stage. The top two teams from each group progress to quarter-finals in the main competition, with the winners of those quarter-finals competing in cup semi-finals and the losers competing in plate semi-finals. The bottom two teams from each group progress to quarter-finals in the consolation competition, with the winners of those quarter-finals competing in bowl semi-finals and the losers competing in shield semi-finals.

== Teams ==
- Argentina
- Australia
- Canada
- England
- France
- Fiji
- Georgia
- Germany
- Kenya
- New Zealand
- Portugal
- Samoa
- Scotland
- South Africa
- United States
- Wales

== Pool stages ==
=== Pool A ===
Team	Pld	W	D	L	PF	PA	+/-	Pts
South Africa	3	3	0	0	116	19	+97	9
Australia	3	2	0	1	95	38	+57	7
Wales	3	1	0	2	71	65	+6	5
Germany	3	0	0	3	5	165	-160	3

Date	Team 1	Score	Team 2
2009-05-23	South Africa	29 - 5	Wales
2009-05-23	Australia	50 - 0	Germany
2009-05-23	South Africa	70 - 0	Germany
2009-05-23	Australia	31 - 21	Wales
2009-05-23	Wales	45 - 5	Germany
2009-05-23	South Africa	17 - 14	Australia

=== Pool B ===
Team	Pld	W	D	L	PF	PA	+/-	Pts
England	3	3	0	0	112	28	+84	9
France	3	1	1	1	97	53	+44	6
Samoa	3	1	1	1	87	57	+30	6
Georgia	3	0	0	3	7	165	-158	2

Date	Team 1	Score	Team 2
2009-05-23	England	20 - 14	France
2009-05-23	Samoa	47 - 0	Georgia
2009-05-23	England	61 - 0	Georgia
2009-05-23	Samoa	26 - 26	France
2009-05-23	France	57 - 7	Georgia
2009-05-23	England	31 - 14	Samoa

=== Pool C ===
Team	Pld	W	D	L	PF	PA	+/-	Pts
Scotland	3	2	0	1	64	24	+40	7
Fiji	3	2	0	1	59	27	+32	7
Kenya	3	2	0	1	55	38	+17	7
United States	3	0	0	3	10	99	-89	3

Date	Team 1	Score	Team 2
2009-05-23	Fiji	26 - 10	United States
2009-05-23	Kenya	17 - 12	Scotland
2009-05-23	Fiji	7 - 12	Scotland
2009-05-23	Kenya	33 - 0	United States
2009-05-23	United States	0 - 40	Scotland
2009-05-23	Fiji	26 - 5	Kenya

=== Pool D ===
Team	Pld	W	D	L	PF	PA	+/-	Pts
New Zealand	3	3	0	0	121	7	+114	9
Portugal	3	1	1	1	52	71	-19	6
Argentina	3	1	1	1	45	71	-26	6
Canada	3	0	0	3	19	88	-79	3

Date	Team 1	Score	Team 2
2009-05-23	Argentina	21 - 21	Portugal
2009-05-23	New Zealand	40 - 0	Canada
2009-05-23	Argentina	24 - 12	Canada
2009-05-23	New Zealand	43 - 7	Portugal
2009-05-23	Portugal	24 - 7	Canada
2009-05-23	Argentina	0 - 38	New Zealand

== Knockout ==
=== Shield ===
Quarter-finals
24 May - London, England
Wales	36
Georgia	0
24 May - London, England
Argentina	24
United States	19
24 May - London, England
Kenya	12
Canada	7
24 May - London, England
Samoa	42
Germany	0

Semi-finals
24 May - London, England
Georgia	12
United States	38
24 May - London, England
Canada	26
Germany	24

Final
24 May - London, England
United States	7
Canada	27

=== Bowl ===
Quarter-finals
24 May - London, England
Wales	36
Georgia	0
24 May - London, England
Argentina	24
United States	19
24 May - London, England
Kenya	12
Canada	7
24 May - London, England
Samoa	42
Germany	0

Semi-finals
24 May - London, England
Wales	19
Argentina	14
24 May - London, England
Kenya	17
Samoa	10

Final
24 May - London, England
Wales	7
Kenya	12

=== Plate ===
Quarter-finals
24 May - London, England
South Africa	21
France	5
24 May - London, England
New Zealand	33
Fiji	14
24 May - London, England
Scotland	22
Portugal	21
24 May - London, England
England	26
Australia	12

Semi-finals
24 May - London, England
France	19
Fiji	35
24 May - London, England
Portugal	19
Australia	10

Final
24 May - London, England
Fiji	24
Portugal	10

=== Cup ===
Quarter-finals
24 May - London, England
South Africa	21
France	5
24 May - London, England
New Zealand	33
Fiji	14
24 May - London, England
Scotland	22
Portugal	21
24 May - London, England
England	26
Australia	12

Semi-finals
24 May - London, England
South Africa	5
New Zealand	10
24 May - London, England
Scotland	12
England	26

Final
24 May - London, England
New Zealand	26
England	31

Preceded by Adelaide Sevens	London Sevens; 2009	Succeeded by Edinburgh Sevens
