= Dennis Ombachi =

- Born: December 14, 1990 (age 35)
- Height: 1.85 m (6 ft 1 in)
- Weight: 108 kg (238 lb; 17 st 0 lb)

Rugby union career
National sevens team
Years	Team	Comps
- Kenya

Dennis Ombachi, popularly known as The Roaming Chef,(born December 14, 1990) is a former Kenyan rugby sevens player and a self-taught chef.

== Career ==
=== Rugby ===
In 2015, during the Africa Olympics Qualifiers game between Kenya and Zimbabwe, Ombachi made the final score that helped Kenya 7S qualify for the 2016 Olympics in Rio.

He competed for Kenya 7s at the 2016 Summer Olympics. He also was a member of the squad that competed at the 2013 Rugby World Cup Sevens in Russia.

In 2018, Ombachi was named as part of the 12 players representing Kenya at the Rugby Sevens World Cup.

Ombachi planned to retire after the 2020 Tokyo Olympics. The event would however be postponed due to the Covid-19 pandemic.

Following injuries in his rugby career, the Kenya Rugby Union eventually terminated his contract.

=== Self-taught chef: The Roaming Chef ===
This would lead to the start of his career as a self-taught chef, popularly known as The Roaming Chef. During the Covid-19 lockdown, Ombachi started sharing his cooking videos on social media pages.

In 2022, Ombachi won the TikTok Award for Top Creator of 2022 on Sub-Saharan Africa.

In 2024, Ombachi was among the 50 creators selected by TikTok for the TikTok Change Makers Program. Each of the creators received a $25,000 grant. Following this program, Ombachi partnered with Motto News, to advocate for mental health, digital literacy and education of Kenyan youth and children.

In 2025, Ombachi headlined the 2025 edition of a Taste of Thai promotion in Kenya, organised by the Royal Thai Embassy.

== Personal life ==
Ombachi has revealed that in 2018 he was diagnosed with Bipolar.

Ombachi is married to Svetlana Pokikarpova. They have two children together.
