= 2017–18 RFU Championship =

Ninth season of second division english rugby union league

2017–18 Green King IPA Championship
- Countries: England; Jersey
- Date: 2 September 2017 – 28 April 2018
- Champions: Bristol (4th title)
- Runners-up: Ealing Trailfinders
- Relegated: Rotherham Titans
- Matches played: 132
- Attendance: 251,953 (average 1,909 per match)
- Highest attendance: 13,100; Bristol v Doncaster Knights; 13 April 2018
- Lowest attendance: 426; Hartpury College v Nottingham; 10 February 2018
- Tries scored: 907 (average 6.9 per match)
- Top point scorer: (Ireland) Ian Madigan (Bristol); 232 points
- Top try scorer: (Australia) Luke Morahan (Bristol); 17 tries

The 2017–18 RFU Championship, known for sponsorship reasons as the Greene King IPA Championship, was the ninth season of the professionalised format of the RFU Championship, the second tier of the English rugby union league system run by the Rugby Football Union. It was contested by eleven English clubs and one from Jersey in the Channel Islands. The competition was sponsored by Greene King for a fifth successive season. The twelve teams in the RFU Championship also competed in the British and Irish Cup, along with clubs from Ireland and Wales.

On 24 March 2018 Rotherham Titans were relegated with 3 games to go, after losing away to Jersey Reds. Despite seeing some improvements in the second half of the season, the Yorkshire club were easily the weakest side in the division, dropping to 2018–19 National League 1, the lowest level the club have played at for 14 seasons.

On 7 April 2018 Bristol were crowned champions with 2 games to go following title rivals Ealing Trailfinders defeat that day to Doncaster Knights. They met the minimum criteria and therefore were promoted into Premiership Rugby. In winning the championship Bristol also became the most decorated tier 2 side in English league history with 4 league titles to-date.

== Structure ==
The Championship's structure has all the teams playing each other on a home and away basis. The play-offs for promotion have been abolished and replaced by the first ranked team being promoted; providing that club's ground fulfills the Rugby Football Union's Minimum Standards Criteria. Under the play-off system some clubs qualified for the play-offs but did not meet the RFU's Minimum Standards Criteria which meant they could not be promoted. The change was made to allow the promoted team additional time to prepare for playing in the English Premiership. As part of an agreement with the RFU, each club will receive £530,000 funding.

== Teams ==
Locations of the 2017–18 RFU Championship teams

In January 2017, London Welsh was expelled from the RFU Championship and then liquidated due to debt. As a result, Rotherham Titans, who finished bottom of the league, were not relegated; a decision which former Championship club Plymouth Albion contested. Promoted in place of London Welsh were the winners of 2016–17 National League 1, Hartpury College, who have moved from Gloucester 3 North, at the bottom of the English rugby pyramid, to the second tier within thirteen years of their founding. London Irish was promoted as champions and play-off winners of the 2016–17 RFU Championship and were replaced by Bristol following their last place in the 2016–17 English Premiership.

Greater London RFU Championship teams

Club	Stadium	Capacity	Area
Bedford Blues	Goldington Road	5,000 (1,700 seats)	Bedford, Bedfordshire
Bristol	Ashton Gate Stadium	27,000	Bristol
Cornish Pirates	Mennaye Field	4,000 (2,200 Seats)	Penzance, Cornwall
Doncaster Knights	Castle Park	5,000	Doncaster, South Yorkshire
Ealing Trailfinders	Trailfinders Sports Ground	3,020 (1,020 seats)	West Ealing, London
Hartpury College	College Stadium	2,000	Hartpury, Gloucestershire
Jersey Reds	Stade Santander International	4,000	Saint Peter, Jersey
London Scottish	Athletic Ground, Richmond	4,500 (1,000 seats)	Richmond, London
Nottingham	Lady Bay Sports Ground	3,000	Nottingham, Nottinghamshire
Richmond	Athletic Ground, Richmond	4,500 (1,000 seats)	Richmond, London
Rotherham Titans	Clifton Lane	2,500	Rotherham, South Yorkshire
Yorkshire Carnegie	Headingley Carnegie Stadium	13,000 (Note: Although Headingley's full capacity is 21,062, it will be 13,000 for most of the season due to the south stand being redeveloped.)	Leeds, West Yorkshire

== Table ==
2017–18 RFU Championship table
Pos	Team	Pld	W	D	L	PF	PA	PD	TB	LB	Pts	Qualification
1	Bristol (C)	22	21	0	1	949	417	+532	18	1	103	Promotion place
2	Ealing Trailfinders	22	16	1	5	766	522	+244	15	2	83	
3	Bedford Blues	22	11	2	9	654	576	+78	14	6	68	
4	Cornish Pirates	22	12	0	10	681	577	+104	10	9	67	
5	Jersey Reds	22	13	1	8	542	480	+62	8	3	65	
6	Yorkshire Carnegie	22	12	2	8	518	547	−29	9	2	63	
7	Doncaster Knights	22	9	1	12	582	615	−33	13	6	57	
8	Nottingham	22	10	1	11	547	619	−72	7	3	52	
9	Richmond	22	9	0	13	444	597	−153	6	4	46	
10	Hartpury College	22	6	1	15	480	623	−143	9	7	42	
11	London Scottish	22	6	1	15	521	707	−186	8	6	40	
12	Rotherham Titans (R)	22	2	0	20	376	780	−404	2	4	14	Relegation place

Updated to match(es) played on 28 April 2018. Source: "Greene King IPA Championship". NCA Rugby.
Rules for classification: If teams are level at any stage, tiebreakers are applied in the following order:
1. Number of matches won
2. Difference between points for and against
3. Total number of points for
4. Aggregate number of points scored in matches between tied teams
5. Number of matches won excluding the first match, then the second and so on until the tie is settled

== Fixtures ==
Fixtures for the season were announced by the RFU on 9 June 2017.

=== Round 1 ===
2 September 2017
14:00

London Scottish	30 – 12	Yorkshire Carnegie
	Report

Athletic Ground
Attendance: 827
Referee: Karl Dickson

2 September 2017
14:30

(BP) Jersey Reds	24 – 26	Doncaster Knights
	Report

St Peter
Attendance: 1,244
Referee: Andrew Jackson

2 September 2017
15:00

(BP) Ealing Trailfinders	29 – 28	Cornish Pirates (BP)
	Report

Trailfinders Sports Ground
Attendance: 650
Referee: Greg MacDonald

2 September 2017
17:00

Richmond	7 – 36	Bedford Blues (BP)
	Report

Athletic Ground
Attendance: 788
Referee: Christophe Ridley

3 September 2017
14:00

Rotherham Titans	10 – 46	Nottingham (BP)
	Report

Clifton Lane
Attendance: 1,017
Referee: Michael Hudson

3 September 2017
15:00

Bristol	26 – 15	Hartpury College
	Report

Ashton Gate
Attendance: 7,045
Referee: Matthew O'Grady

=== Round 2 ===
8 September 2017
19:45

Nottingham	27 – 35	Yorkshire Carnegie (BP)
	Report

Lady Bay Sports Ground
Attendance: 1,053
Referee: Matthew O'Grady

9 September 2017
14:30

(BP) Doncaster Knights	44 – 0	Rotherham Titans
	Report

Castle Park
Attendance: 1,389
Referee: Ian Tempest

9 September 2017
14:30

(BP) Hartpury College	19 – 20	Jersey Reds
	Report

College Stadium
Attendance: 755
Referee: John Meredith

9 September 2017
15:00

(BP) Bedford Blues	44 – 26	London Scottish (BP)
	Report

Goldington Road
Attendance: 2,175
Referee: Simon Harding

10 September 2017
15:00

(BP) Richmond	26 – 33	Ealing Trailfinders (BP)
	Report

Athletic Ground
Attendance: 604
Referee: Fergus Kirby

11 September 2017
15:00

(2BP) Cornish Pirates	29 – 31	Bristol (BP)
	Report

Mennaye Field
Attendance: 2,236
Referee: Karl Dickson

=== Round 3 ===
15 September 2017
19:45

Jersey Reds	19 – 13	Cornish Pirates (BP)
	Report

St Peter
Attendance: 1,629
Referee: Christopher Ridley

16 September 2017
14:00

Rotherham Titans	21 – 32	Hartpury College (BP)
	Report

Clifton Lane
Attendance: 882
Referee: Jack Makepeace

16 September 2017
15:00

(BP) Ealing Trailfinders	45 – 25	Bedford Blues
	Report

Trailfinders Sports Ground
Attendance: 735
Referee: Steve Lee

16 September 2017
15:00

(2BP) London Scottish	31 – 33	Nottingham (BP)
	Report

Athletic Ground
Attendance: 800
Referee: Anthony Woodthorpe

17 September 2017
14:00

(BP) Bristol	50 – 5	Richmond
	Report

Ashton Gate
Attendance: 6,509
Referee: Hamish Smales

17 September 2017
15:00

Yorkshire Carnegie	15 – 9	Doncaster Knights (BP)
	Report

Headingley Carnegie Stadium
Attendance: 2,160
Referee: Greg MacDonald

=== Round 4 ===
23 September 2017
14:30

(BP) Doncaster Knights	32 – 26	Nottingham (BP)
	Report

Castle Park
Attendance: 1,039
Referee: John Meredith

23 September 2017
14:30

(BP) Hartpury College	29 – 29	Yorkshire Carnegie
	Report

College Stadium
Attendance: 1,026
Referee: Michael Hudson

23 September 2017
14:30

Richmond	23 – 14	Jersey Reds
	Report

Athletic Ground
Attendance: 821
Referee: Matthew Carley

23 September 2017
15:00

(BP) Bedford Blues	38 – 61	Bristol (BP)
	Report

Goldington Road
Attendance: 2,607
Referee: Andrew Jackson

24 September 2017
14:30

(BP) Cornish Pirates	62 – 47	Rotherham Titans (BP)
	Report

Mennaye Field
Attendance: 1,244
Referee: Dean Richards

24 September 2017
15:00

(BP) Ealing Trailfinders	72 – 12	London Scottish
	Report

Trailfinders Sports Ground
Attendance: 1,006
Referee: Matthew O'Grady

=== Round 5 ===
29 September 2017
19:45

Nottingham	31 – 28	Hartpury College (2BP)
	Report

Lady Bay Sports Ground
Attendance: 1,175
Referee: Hamish Smales

30 September 2017
14:00

Rotherham Titans	22 – 39	Richmond (BP)
	Report

Clifton Lane
Attendance: 768
Referee: Greg MacDonald

30 September 2017
15:00

(BP) Jersey Reds	13 – 15	Bedford Blues
	Report

St Peter
Attendance: 1,441
Referee: Tim Wigglesworth

30 September 2017
15:00

London Scottish	15 – 27	Doncaster Knights (BP)
	Report

Athletic Ground
Attendance: 868
Referee: Fergus Kirby

1 October 2017
15:00

(BP) Bristol	32 – 23	Ealing Trailfinders
	Report

Ashton Gate
Attendance: 7,170
Referee: Christophe Ridley

1 October 2017
15:00

(BP) Yorkshire Carnegie	28 – 26	Cornish Pirates (BP)

Headingley Carnegie Stadium
Attendance: 1,520
Referee: Karl Dickson

=== Round 6 ===
7 October 2017
14:30

(BP) Bristol	47 – 26	London Scottish (BP)
	Report

Ashton Gate
Attendance: 8,429
Referee: Steve Lee

7 October 2017
14:30

(BP) Hartpury College	29 – 27	Doncaster Knights (BP)
	Report

College Stadium
Attendance: 793
Referee: Tim Wigglesworth

7 October 2017
15:00

(BP) Bedford Blues	34 – 14	Rotherham Titans
	Report

Goldington Road
Attendance: 2,237
Referee: John Meredith

7 October 2017
15:00

(BP) Ealing Trailfinders	31 – 8	Jersey Reds
	Report

Trailfinders Sports Ground
Attendance: 595
Referee: Dean Richards

7 October 2017
15:00

(BP) Richmond	31 – 20	Yorkshire Carnegie (BP)

Athletic Ground
Attendance: 1,020
Referee: Fergus Kirby

8 October 2017
14:30

(2BP) Cornish Pirates	31 – 34	Nottingham (BP)
	Report

Mennaye Field
Attendance: 1,309
Referee: Michael Hudson

=== Round 7 ===
27 October 2017
19:45

(BP) Nottingham	34 – 17	Richmond
	Report

Lady Bay Sports Ground
Attendance: 1,355
Referee: Karl Dickson

28 October 2017
14:00

(BP) Rotherham Titans	18 – 23	Ealing Trailfinders (BP)
	Report

Clifton Lane
Attendance: 714
Referee: Simon Harding

28 October 2017
15:00

Jersey Reds	17 – 36	Bristol (BP)
	Report

St Peter
Attendance: 2,174
Referee: Dean Richards

28 October 2017
15:00

(BP) London Scottish	13 – 15	Hartpury College
	Report

Athletic Ground
Attendance: 956
Referee: Greg McDonald

29 October 2017
15:00

(BP) Doncaster Knights	29 – 46	Cornish Pirates (BP)
	Report

Castle Park
Attendance: 1,897
Referee: Christophe Ridley

29 October 2017
15:00

(BP) Yorkshire Carnegie	38 – 36	Bedford Blues (2BP)

Headingley Carnegie Stadium
Attendance: 1,788
Referee: Adam Leal

=== Round 8 ===
10 November 2017
19:45

(BP) Bedford Blues	30 – 12	Nottingham
	Report

Goldington Road
Attendance: 2,904
Referee: Simon Harding

10 November 2017
19:45

Jersey Reds	20 – 15	London Scottish (BP)
	Report

St Peter
Attendance: 1,408
Referee: John Meredith

10 November 2017
19:45

Richmond	26 – 22	Doncaster Knights (2BP)
	Report

Athletic Ground
Attendance: 1,054
Referee: Dean Richards

11 November 2017
12:30

(BP) Bristol	55 – 10	Rotherham Titans
	Report

Ashton Gate
Attendance: 8,184
Referee: Adam Leal

11 November 2017
15:00

(BP) Ealing Trailfinders	44 – 19	Yorkshire Carnegie

Trailfinders Sports Ground
Attendance: 759
Referee: Andrew Jackson

12 November 2017
14:30

Cornish Pirates	25 – 13	Hartpury College
	Report

Mennaye Field
Attendance: 1,432
Referee: Matthew O’Grady

=== Round 9 ===
17 November 2017
19:45

(BP) London Scottish	32 – 26	Cornish Pirates (BP)
	Report

Athletic Ground
Attendance: 1,385
Referee: Fergus Kirby

17 November 2017
20:00

Yorkshire Carnegie	14 – 44	Bristol (BP)

Headingley Carnegie Stadium
Attendance: 2,478
Referee: Hamish Smales

18 November 2017
14:00

Rotherham Titans	14 – 45	Jersey Reds (BP)
	Report

Clifton Lane
Attendance: 812
Referee: Steve Lee

18 November 2017
14:30

(BP) Doncaster Knights	25 – 25	Bedford Blues
	Report

Castle Park
Attendance: 1,076
Referee: John Meredith

18 November 2017
14:30

(BP) Hartpury College	15 – 18	Richmond
	Report

College Stadium
Attendance: 733
Referee: Michael Harris

19 November 2017
15:00

Nottingham	28 – 27	Ealing Trailfinders (2BP)
	Report

Lady Bay Sports Ground
Attendance: 919
Referee: Jack Makepeace

=== Round 10 ===
24 November 2017
19:45

(BP) Bedford Blues	33 – 7	Hartpury College
	Report

Goldington Road
Attendance: 2,775
Referee: Michael Hudson

25 November 2017
12:30

(BP) Bristol	50 – 21	Nottingham
	Report

Ashton Gate Stadium
Attendance: 6,789
Referee: Simon Harding

25 November 2017
14:00

(BP) Rotherham Titans	24 – 27	London Scottish
	Report

Clifton Lane
Attendance: 634
Referee: Matthew O'Grady

25 November 2017
15:00

(BP) Ealing Trailfinders	57 – 14	Doncaster Knights
	Report

Trailfinders Sports Ground
Attendance: 574
Referee: Steve Lee

25 November 2017
15:00

Jersey Reds	10 – 20	Yorkshire Carnegie
	Report

St Peter
Attendance: 1,103
Referee: Fergus Kirby

25 November 2017
15:00

Richmond	15 – 28	Cornish Pirates
	Report

Athletic Ground
Attendance: 987
Referee: Dean Richards

=== Round 11 ===
1 December 2017
19:45

Nottingham	19 – 19	Jersey Reds
	Report

Lady Bay Sports Ground
Attendance: 1,191
Referee: Andrew Jackson

2 December 2017
14:30

Doncaster Knights	18 – 38	Bristol (BP)
	Report

Castle Park
Attendance: 1,191
Referee: Matthew O'Grady

2 December 2017
14:30

Hartpury College	7 – 31	Ealing Trailfinders (BP)
	Report

College Stadium
Attendance: 472
Referee: Christophe Ridley

3 December 2017
14:30

Cornish Pirates	24 – 17	Bedford Blues (BP)
	Report

Mennaye Field
Attendance: 1,407
Referee: Anthony Woodthorpe

3 December 2017
15:00

(BP) London Scottish	24 – 28	Richmond
	Report

Athletic Ground
Attendance: 1,849
Referee: Karl Dickson

3 December 2017
15:00

(BP) Yorkshire Carnegie	47 – 11	Rotherham Titans

Headingley Carnegie Stadium
Attendance: 1,429
Referee: Dean Richards

=== Round 12 ===
22 December 2017
19:45

(BP) Bristol	56 – 19	Cornish Pirates
	Report

Ashton Gate Stadium
Attendance: 11,184
Referee: Matthew O’Grady

22 December 2017
19:45

Jersey Reds	18 – 14	Hartpury College (BP)
	Report

St Peter
Attendance: 1,257
Referee: Dean Richards

23 December 2017
14:00

Rotherham Titans	19 – 36	Doncaster Knights (BP)
	Report

Clifton Lane
Attendance: 1,607
Referee: Tim Wigglesworth

23 December 2017
15:00

(BP) Ealing Trailfinders	40 – 24	Richmond (BP)
	Report

Trailfinders Sports Ground
Attendance: 1,030 (Note: The Rugby Paper reported an attendance of 405 for Ealing Trailfinders v Richmond on 23 December compared to the Ealing Trailfinders website report which had it as 1,030. The official attendance is much more likely, given that it was a local derby at Christmas where attendances tend to be higher than normal.)
Referee: JP Doyle

23 December 2017
15:00

(BP) London Scottish	52 – 52	Bedford Blues (BP)
	Report

Athletic Ground
Attendance: 1,280
Referee: Christophe Ridley

23 December 2017
15:00

Yorkshire Carnegie	12 – 10	Nottingham (BP)

Headingley Carnegie Stadium
Attendance: 2,128
Referee: Steve Lee

=== Round 13 ===
29 December 2017
19:45

(2BP) Doncaster Knights	30 – 32	Yorkshire Carnegie (BP)
	Report

Castle Park
Attendance: 2,002
Referee: Greg MacDonald

29 December 2017
19:45

(BP) Nottingham	17 – 21	London Scottish
	Report

Lady Bay Sports Ground
Attendance: 1,225
Referee: Karl Dickson

30 December 2017
14:30

Hartpury College	27 – 18	Rotherham Titans
	Report

College Stadium
Attendance: 826
Referee: John Meredith

30 December 2017
15:00

(BP) Bedford Blues	23 – 24	Ealing Trailfinders
	Report

Goldington Road
Attendance: 3,401
Referee: Simon Harding

30 December 2017
15:00

(BP) Richmond	22 – 57	Bristol (BP)
	Report

Athletic Ground
Attendance: 1,425
Referee: Dean Richards

31 December 2017
14:00

(BP) Cornish Pirates	15 – 19	Jersey Reds
	Report

Mennaye Field
Attendance: 2,226
Referee: Jack Makepeace

=== Round 14 ===
27 January 2018
14:00

Rotherham Titans	27 – 24	Cornish Pirates (BP)
	Report

Clifton Lane
Attendance: 687
Referee: Fergus Kirby

27 January 2018
15:00

Jersey Reds	10 – 9	Richmond (BP)
	Report

St Peter
Attendance: 1,184
Referee: Tim Wigglesworth

27 January 2018
15:00

London Scottish	3 – 25	Ealing Trailfinders
	Report

Athletic Ground
Attendance: 1,145
Referee: Matt Carley

28 January 2018
15:00

Bristol	18 – 13	Bedford Blues (BP)
	Report

Ashton Gate Stadium
Attendance: 9,208
Referee: Tom Foley

28 January 2018
15:00

Nottingham	6 – 27	Doncaster Knights (BP)
	Report

Lady Bay Sports Ground
Attendance: 1,095
Referee: Dean Richards

28 January 2018
15:00

Yorkshire Carnegie	20 – 16	Hartpury College (BP)

Headingley Carnegie Stadium
Attendance: 1,562
Referee: Hamish Smales

=== Round 15 ===
9 February 2018
19:45

(2BP) Bedford Blues	29 – 33	Jersey Reds (BP)
	Report

Goldington Road
Attendance: 2,431
Referee: Hamish Smales

10 February 2018
14:00

Richmond	11 – 3	Rotherham Titans (BP)
	Report

Athletic Ground
Attendance: 468
Referee: Greg MacDonald

10 February 2018
14:30

Doncaster Knights	19 – 17	London Scottish (BP)
	Report

Castle Park
Attendance: 887
Referee: John Meredith

10 February 2018
14:30

(BP) Hartpury College	39 – 20	Nottingham
	Report

College Stadium
Attendance: 426
Referee: Matthew O'Grady

10 February 2018
19:00

(BP) Ealing Trailfinders	27 – 28	Bristol (BP)
	Report

Trailfinders Sports Ground
Attendance: 1,589
Referee: Luke Pearce

11 February 2018
14:30

Cornish Pirates	P – P	Yorkshire Carnegie

Mennaye Field

- Postponed due to waterlogged pitch caused by heavy rain. Game rescheduled to 25 February 2018.

=== Round 16 ===
16 February 2018
19:45

(BP) Jersey Reds	24 – 32	Ealing Trailfinders (BP)
	Report

St Peter
Attendance: 1,448
Referee: Christophe Ridley

16 February 2018
19:45

Nottingham	18 – 17	Cornish Pirates (BP)
	Report

Lady Bay Sports Ground
Attendance: 1,390
Referee: Tim Wigglesworth

17 February 2018
14:00

(BP) Rotherham Titans	15 – 18	Bedford Blues
	Report

Clifton Lane
Attendance: 609
Referee: Fergus Kirby

17 February 2018
14:30

(BP) Doncaster Knights	48 – 38	Hartpury College (BP)
	Report

Castle Park
Attendance: 1,220
Referee: Steve Lee

17 February 2018
15:00

London Scottish	15 – 55	Bristol (BP)
	Report

Athletic Ground
Attendance: 1,863
Referee: Karl Dickson

18 February 2018
15:00

(BP) Yorkshire Carnegie	28 – 22	Richmond (BP)

Headingley Carnegie Stadium
Attendance: 1,752
Referee: Andrew Jackson

=== Round 15 (rescheduled game) ===
25 February 2018
14:30

(BP) Cornish Pirates	22 – 12	Yorkshire Carnegie
	Report

Mennaye Field
Attendance: 1,112
Referee: Simon Harding

- Game rescheduled from 11 February 2018.

=== Round 17 ===
3 March 2018
14:30

Hartpury College	P – P	London Scottish

College Stadium

- Postponed due to bad weather (snow). Game to be rescheduled for 10 March 2018.

3 March 2018
15:00

(BP) Bedford Blues	41 – 22	Yorkshire Carnegie

Goldington Road
Attendance: 1,743
Referee: Andrew Jackson

3 March 2018
15:00

Ealing Trailfinders	P – P	Rotherham Titans

Trailfinders Sports Ground

- Postponed due to bad weather (snow). Game to be rescheduled for 10 March 2018.

3 March 2018
15:00

Richmond	P – P	Nottingham

Athletic Ground

- Postponed due to bad weather (snow). Game to be rescheduled for 30 March 2018.

4 March 2018
14:00

(2BP) Bristol	34 – 38	Jersey Reds (BP)
	Report

Ashton Gate
Attendance: 8,010
Referee: Ian Tempest

4 March 2018
14:30

Cornish Pirates	22 – 19	Doncaster Knights (BP)
	Report

Mennaye Field
Attendance: 1,166
Referee: Sara Cox

=== Round 17 (rescheduled games) ===
10 March 2018
14:30

Hartpury College	14 – 11	London Scottish (BP)
	Report

College Stadium
Attendance: 677
Referee: Jack Makepeace

- Game rescheduled from 3 March 2018.

10 March 2018
15:00

(BP) Ealing Trailfinders	37 – 35	Rotherham Titans (2BP)
	Report

Trailfinders Sports Ground
Attendance: 642
Referee: John Meredith

- Game rescheduled from 3 March 2018.

=== Round 18 ===
16 March 2018
19:45

London Scottish	19 – 52	Jersey Reds (BP)
	Report

Athletic Ground
Attendance: 1,073
Referee: Maxwell Keys

17 March 2018
14:00

Rotherham Titans	3 – 24	Bristol
	Report

Clifton Lane
Attendance: 617
Referee: Tim Wigglesworth

17 March 2018
14:30

(BP) Hartpury College	20 – 45	Cornish Pirates (BP)
	Report

College Stadium
Attendance: 937
Referee: Fergus Kirby

17 March 2018
15:00

Doncaster Knights	12 – 22	Richmond
	Report

Castle Park
Attendance: 985
Referee: Hamish Smales

18 March 2018
15:00

Nottingham	P – P	Bedford Blues

Lady Bay Sports Ground

- Postponed due to bad weather (snow). Game to be rescheduled for 24 April 2018.

18 March 2018
15:00

Yorkshire Carnegie	P – P	Ealing Trailfinders

Headingley Carnegie Stadium

- Postponed due to bad weather (snow). Game to be rescheduled for 17 April 2018.

=== Round 19 ===
23 March 2018
19:45

Bristol	18 – 13	Yorkshire Carnegie (BP)
	Report

Ashton Gate Stadium
Attendance: 7,728
Referee: Karl Dickson

24 March 2018
15:00

(BP) Bedford Blues	41 – 32	Doncaster Knights (BP)
	Report

Goldington Road
Attendance: 2,316
Referee: Christophe Ridley

24 March 2018
15:00

(BP) Ealing Trailfinders	45 – 20	Nottingham
	Report

Trailfinders Sports Ground
Attendance: 696
Referee: Simon Harding

24 March 2018
15:00

(BP) Jersey Reds	38 – 16	Rotherham Titans
	Report

St Peter
Attendance: 1,589
Referee: Mike Hudson

- Rotherham Titans are relegated.

24 March 2018
15:00

(BP) Richmond	28 – 22	Hartpury College (BP)
	Report

Athletic Ground
Attendance: 643
Referee: John Meredith

25 March 2018
15:00

(BP) Cornish Pirates	55 – 38	London Scottish (BP)
	Report

Mennaye Field
Attendance: 1,445
Referee: Sara Cox

=== Round 17 (rescheduled game) ===
30 March 2018
17:00

Richmond	12 – 20	Nottingham
	Report

Athletic Ground
Attendance: 668
Referee: Michael Hudson

- Game rescheduled from 3 March 2018.

=== Round 20 ===
6 April 2018
19:45

Nottingham	17 – 60	Bristol (BP)
	Report

Lady Bay Sports Ground
Attendance: 1,575
Referee: Jack Makepeace

- Bristol are champions following Ealing's defeat to Doncaster on the following day.

7 April 2018
14:30

(BP) Doncaster Knights	50 – 19	Ealing Trailfinders
	Report

Castle Park
Attendance: 957
Referee: Andrew Jackson

7 April 2018
14:30

(BP) Hartpury College	21 – 26	Bedford Blues (BP)
	Report

College Stadium
Attendance: 1,050
Referee: Simon Harding

7 April 2018
15:00

(BP) London Scottish	49 – 14	Rotherham Titans
	Report

Athletic Ground
Attendance: 1,330
Referee: Sara Cox

8 April 2018
14:30

Cornish Pirates	51 – 20	Richmond
	Report

Mennaye Field
Attendance: 1,360
Referee: Adam Leal

8 April 2018
15:00

(BP) Yorkshire Carnegie	26 – 21	Jersey Reds (BP)

Headingley Carnegie Stadium
Attendance: 1,366
Referee: Anthony Woodthorpe

=== Round 21 ===
13 April 2018
19:45

(BP) Bristol	68 – 10	Doncaster Knights
	Report

Ashton Gate Stadium
Attendance: 13,100 (Note: Bristol's attendance of 13,100 was a RFU Championship regular season record. Note this does not include the RFU Championship playoff games used in previous seasons or games in the old National Division One prior to the Championship's inception in 2009-10.)
Referee: Greg MacDonald

14 April 2018
14:00

Rotherham Titans	30 – 26	Yorkshire Carnegie (2BP)

Clifton Lane
Attendance: 681
Referee: Dean Richards

14 April 2018
15:00

(2BP) Bedford Blues	29 – 34	Cornish Pirates (BP)
	Report

Goldington Road
Attendance: 2,575
Referee: Michael Hudson

14 April 2018
15:00

(BP) Ealing Trailfinders	54 – 36	Hartpury College (BP)
	Report

Trailfinders Sports Ground
Attendance: 679
Referee: Tim Wigglesworth

14 April 2018
15:00

(BP) Jersey Reds	50 – 29	Nottingham (BP)
	Report

St Peter
Attendance: 1,851
Referee: Steve Lee

14 April 2018
15:00

(2BP) Richmond	28 – 30	London Scottish (BP)
	Report

Athletic Ground
Attendance: 1,798
Referee: Andrew Jackson

=== Round 18 (rescheduled games) ===
17 April 2018
19:45

Yorkshire Carnegie	23 – 23	Ealing Trailfinders

Headingley Carnegie Stadium
Attendance: 1,274
Referee: Adam Leal

- Game rescheduled from 18 March 2018.

24 April 2018
15:00

(BP) Nottingham	41 – 21	Bedford Blues
	Report

Lady Bay Sports Ground
Attendance: 463
Referee: Neil Chivers

- Game rescheduled from 18 March 2018.

=== Round 22 ===
27 April 2018
19:45

(BP) Nottingham	38 – 5	Rotherham Titans
	Report

Lady Bay Sports Ground
Attendance: 1,055
Referee: Andrea Piardi

28 April 2018
15:00

(BP) Cornish Pirates	39 – 25	Ealing Trailfinders (BP)
	Report

Mennaye Field
Attendance: 1,778
Referee: Matthew O'Grady

28 April 2018
15:00

(BP) Hartpury College	24 – 61	Bristol (BP)
	Report

College Stadium
Attendance: 2,400 (Note: Hartpury had temporary seating installed, allowing them to expand their capacity above 2,000 for their final league match against Bristol.)
Referee: Christophe Ridley

28 April 2018
15:00

(BP) Bedford Blues	28 – 12	Richmond
	Report

Goldington Road
Attendance: 2,669
Referee: Fergus Kirby

28 April 2018
15:00

(2BP) Doncaster Knights	26 – 30	Jersey Reds (BP)
	Report

Castle Park
Attendance: 1,675
Referee: Hamish Smales

28 April 2018
15:00

Yorkshire Carnegie	27 – 19	London Scottish

Headingley Carnegie
Attendance: 1,720
Referee: Simon Harding

== Attendances ==
Club	Home Games	Total	Average	Highest	Lowest	% Capacity
Bedford Blues	11	27,833	2,530	3,401	1,743	51%
Bristol	11	93,356	8,487	13,100	6,509	31%
Cornish Pirates	11	16,715	1,520	2,236	1,112	38%
Doncaster Knights	11	14,318	1,302	2,002	887	26%
Ealing Trailfinders	11	8,955	814	1,589	574	27%
Hartpury College	11	10,095	918	2,400	426	44%
Jersey Reds	11	16,328	1,484	2,174	1,103	37%
London Scottish	11	13,376	1,216	1,863	800	27%
Nottingham	11	12,496	1,136	1,575	463	38%
Richmond	11	10,276	934	1,798	468	21%
Rotherham Titans	11	9,028	821	1,607	609	33%
Yorkshire Carnegie	11	19,177	1,743	2,478	1,274	13%

== Individual statistics ==
- Note that points scorers includes tries as well as conversions, penalties and drop goals. Appearance figures also include coming on as substitutes (unused substitutes not included).

=== Top points scorers ===
Rank	Player	Team	Appearances	Points
1	(Ireland) Ian Madigan	Bristol	20	232
2	(England) Tiff Eden	Nottingham	20	184
3	(England) Robert Kirby	Richmond	20	178
4	(South Africa) Brendan Cope	Jersey Reds	21	174
5	(Ireland) Peter Lydon	Ealing Trailfinders	19	156
6	(England) Jake Sharp	London Scottish	19	139
7	(England) Laurence May	Cornish Pirates	19	137
8	(Wales) Simon Humberstone	Doncaster Knights	20	123
9	(England) Luke Daniels	Ealing Trailfinders	11	113
10	(England) Will Cargill	Cornish Pirates	18	112

=== Top try scorers ===
Rank	Player	Team	Appearances	Tries
1	(Australia) Luke Morahan	Bristol	19	17
2	(England) Dean Adamson	Bedford Blues	19	16
3	(Scotland) Alun Walker	Ealing Trailfinders	21	15
4	(Wales) Jordan Williams	Bristol	19	14
5	(England) Richard Lane	Bedford Blues	19	12
5	(Wales) Rhodri Williams	Bristol	21	12
5	(England) Kyle Moyle	Cornish Pirates	22	12
6	(Ireland) Alex O'Meara	Cornish Pirates	19	11
6	(Australia) Tom Pincus	Jersey Reds	21	11
6	(England) Jordan Burns	Bedford Blues	22	11

== Season records ==
=== Team ===
Largest home win — 60 points

72 - 12 Ealing Trailfinders at home to London Scottish on 24 September 2017

Largest away win — 43 points

60 - 17 Bristol away to Nottingham on 6 April 2018

Most points scored — 72 points

72 - 12 Ealing Trailfinders at home to London Scottish on 24 September 2017

Most tries in a match — 10 (2)

Ealing Trailfinders at home to London Scottish on 24 September 2017
Bristol at home to Doncaster Knights on 13 April 2018

Most conversions in a match — 9

Bristol at home to Doncaster Knights on 13 April 2018

Most penalties in a match — 6

Bristol at home to Yorkshire Carnegie on 23 March 2018

Most drop goals in a match — 2

Nottingham at home to Hartpury College on 29 September 2017

=== Attendances ===
Highest — 13,100

Bristol at home to Cornish Pirates on 13 April 2018

Lowest — 426

Hartpury College at home to Nottingham on 10 February 2018

Highest average attendance — 8,487

Bristol

Lowest average attendance — 814

Ealing Trailfinders

=== Player ===
Most points in a match — 25

(England) Laurence May for Cornish Pirates at home to London Scottish on 25 March 2018

Most tries in a match — 4 (2)

(England) Max Crumpton for Bristol at home to Richmond on 17 September 2017
(Australia) Luke Morahan for Bristol at home to Doncaster Knights on 13 April 2018

Most conversions in a match — 9

(Ireland) Ian Madigan for Bristol at home to Doncaster Knights on 13 April 2018

Most penalties in a match — 6

(Ireland) Ian Madigan for Bristol at home to Yorkshire Carnegie on 23 March 2018

Most drop goals in a match — 2

(England) Tiff Eden for Nottingham at home to Hartpury College on 29 September 2017
