= 2009 USA Sevens =

- 2008–09 Sevens World Series
- Host nation: United States

Cup
- Champion: Argentina
- Runner-up: England

Plate
- Winner: New Zealand

Tournament details
- Matches played: 45
- Most points: (Fiji) P. Rokodiva (48)
- Most tries: (New Zealand) V. Waqasduadua (8)

The 2009 USA Sevens competition took place on February 14 and 15 at Petco Park in San Diego, California. It was the fourth Cup trophy in the 2008-09 IRB Sevens World Series. The USA Sevens is played annually as part of the IRB Sevens World Series for international rugby sevens. Argentina won the 2009 USA Sevens, defeating England 19–14 in the cup final.

This was the last edition of the USA Sevens to be held in San Diego. Starting with the 2010 edition, the event was moved to Sam Boyd Stadium near Las Vegas.

== Teams ==
- Argentina
- Australia
- Canada
- England
- France
- Fiji
- Kenya
- Mexico
- New Zealand
- Samoa
- Scotland
- South Africa
- Japan
- Uruguay
- United States
- Wales

== Pool stages ==
=== Pool A ===
Team	Pld	W	D	L	PF	PA	+/-	Pts
South Africa	3	3	0	0	68	33	+35	9
United States	3	2	0	1	57	27	+30	7
Australia	3	1	0	2	54	46	+8	5
Canada	3	0	0	3	19	92	-73	3

Date	Team 1	Score	Team 2
2009-02-14	South Africa	15 – 14	United States
2009-02-14	Australia	35 – 7	Canada
2009-02-14	South Africa	29 – 12	Canada
2009-02-14	Australia	12-17	United States
2009-02-14	United States	26-0	Canada
2009-02-14	South Africa	22 – 7	Australia

=== Pool B ===
Team	Pld	W	D	L	PF	PA	+/-	Pts
Kenya	3	2	0	1	69	21	+48	7
New Zealand	3	2	0	1	82	36	+46	7
France	3	1	0	2	50	62	-12	5
Uruguay	3	1	0	2	21	103	-82	5

Date	Team 1	Score	Team 2
2009-02-14	New Zealand	22 – 12	France
2009-02-14	Kenya	12 – 14	Uruguay
2009-02-14	New Zealand	53 – 0	Uruguay
2009-02-14	Kenya	33 – 0	France
2009-02-14	France	38-7	Uruguay
2009-02-14	New Zealand	7 – 24	Kenya

=== Pool C ===
Team	Pld	W	D	L	PF	PA	+/-	Pts
Samoa	3	3	0	0	72	26	+46	9
England	3	2	0	1	69	39	+30	7
Scotland	3	1	0	2	48	58	-10	5
Japan	3	0	0	3	31	97	-66	3

Date	Team 1	Score	Team 2
2009-02-14	England	22 – 12	Scotland
2009-02-14	Samoa	33 – 7	Japan
2009-02-14	England	35 – 12	Japan
2009-02-14	Samoa	24 – 7	Scotland
2009-02-14	Scotland	29 – 12	Japan
2009-02-14	England	12-15	Samoa

=== Pool D ===
Team	Pld	W	D	L	PF	PA	+/-	Pts
Fiji	3	3	0	0	111	26	+85	9
Argentina	3	2	0	1	77	24	+53	7
Wales	3	1	0	2	76	55	+21	5
Mexico	3	0	0	3	0	159	-159	3

Date	Team 1	Score	Team 2
2009-02-14	Fiji	35 – 14	Wales
2009-02-14	Argentina	45 – 0	Mexico
2009-02-14	Fiji	57 – 0	Mexico
2009-02-14	Argentina	20 – 5	Wales
2009-02-14	Wales	57 – 0	Mexico
2009-02-14	Fiji	19-12	Argentina

== Knockout ==
=== Shield ===
Quarter-finals
February 15 – San Diego, USA
Australia	27
Uruguay	10
February 15 – San Diego, USA
Wales	28
Japan	12
February 15 – San Diego, USA
Scotland	50
Mexico	0
February 15 – San Diego, USA
France	26
Canada	12

Semi-finals
February 15 – San Diego, USA
Uruguay	26
Japan	10
February 15 – San Diego, USA
Mexico	7
Canada	31

Final
February 15 – San Diego, USA
Uruguay	7
Canada	31

=== Bowl ===
Quarter-finals
February 15 – San Diego, USA
Australia	27
Uruguay	10
February 15 – San Diego, USA
Wales	28
Japan	12
February 15 – San Diego, USA
Scotland	50
Mexico	0
February 15 – San Diego, USA
France	26
Canada	12

Semi-finals
February 15 – San Diego, USA
Australia	26
Wales	24
February 15 – San Diego, USA
Scotland	12
France	17

Final
February 15 – San Diego, USA
Australia	40
France	0

=== Plate ===
Quarter-finals
February 15 – San Diego, USA
South Africa	19
New Zealand	7
February 15 – San Diego, USA
Fiji	10
England	12
February 15 – San Diego, USA
Samoa	5
Argentina	21
February 15 – San Diego, USA
Kenya	7
United States	14

Semi-finals
February 15 – San Diego, USA
New Zealand	24
Fiji	12
February 15 – San Diego, USA
Samoa	12
Kenya	17

Final
February 15 – San Diego, USA
New Zealand	22
Kenya	7

=== Cup ===
Quarter-finals
February 15 – San Diego, USA
South Africa	19
New Zealand	7
February 15 – San Diego, USA
Fiji	10
England	12
February 15 – San Diego, USA
Samoa	5
Argentina	21
February 15 – San Diego, USA
Kenya	7
United States	14

Semi-finals
February 15 – San Diego, USA
South Africa	19
England	22
February 15 – San Diego, USA
Argentina	19
United States	14

Final
February 15 – San Diego, USA
England	14
Argentina	19

== Statistics ==
=== Individual points ===
Individual points Updated:2009-02-15
Pos.	Player	Country	Points
1	Peni Rokodiva	Fiji	48
2	Richard Kingi	Australia	45
3	Viliame Waqasduadua	New Zealand	42
4	Santiago Gomez Cora	Argentina	39
5	Phillip Mack	Canada	36
6	Lee Williams	Wales	35
7=	Ben Gollings	England	32
7=	Martin Rodríguez	Argentina	32
9=	Nese Malifa	United States	30
9=	Luke Morahan	Australia	30

=== Individual tries ===
Individual tries Updated:2009-02-15
Pos.	Player	Country	Tries
1	Viliame Waqasduadua	New Zealand	8
2	Santiago Gomez Cora	Argentina	7
3=	Collins Injera	Kenya	6
3=	Luke Morahan	Australia	6
5=	Tom Biggs	England	5
5=	Gonzalo Camacho	Argentina	5
5=	Pio Tuwai	Fiji	5
8=	Santiago Carracedo	Uruguay	4
8=	Chris Davies	Wales	4
8=	Roddy Grant	Scotland	4

Preceded by Wellington Sevens	San Diego Sevens; 2009	Succeeded by Hong Kong Sevens
