= Benjamin Ayimba =

Kenyan rugby union player (1976–2021)

- Otieno
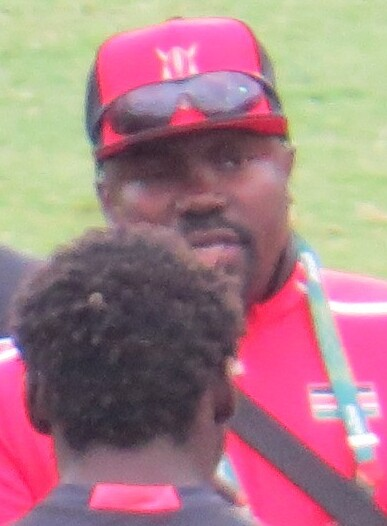
- Born: 27 August 1976; Kenya
- Died: 22 May 2021 (aged 44); Africa
- Burial place: Siaya, Kenya
- Citizenship: Kenyan
- Occupations: Former rugby player and coach
- Spouse: Carolyne waswa Lois Taabu
- Children: Brian Ayimba Gabriel Ayimba Keenan Ayimba Eli Benjamin Ayimba
- Parents: Joachim Ayimba (father); Esther Ayimba (mother)

Benjamin Ayimba (27 August 1976 – 22 May 2021) was a rugby player and coach of the Kenya sevens rugby team.

== Career ==
Ayimba played for Nondescripts RFC 2002 before moving to Cornish Pirates in England between 2003 and 2005. He played in the Kenya Sevens squad that featured in the 2001 and 2005 Rugby World Cup Sevens tournaments in Argentina and Hong Kong respectively. He also represented Kenya at the 1998, 2002 and 2006 Commonwealth Games. He coached the Kenya national rugby sevens team between 2006 and 2011 and again between 2015 and 2016.

== Death ==
On 22 May 2021, Ayimba died from Cerebral Malaria.
