= Renfred Dazel =

South African rugby union player

- Full name: Renfred Leroy Dazel
- Born: 4 May 1981 (age 45)
- School: Paulus Joubert Secondary

Rugby union career
Provincial / State sides
Years	Team	Apps	(Points)
2003–09	Boland Cavaliers		
National sevens team
Years	Team		Comps
2005–12	South Africa		
Medal record
Men's rugby sevens
Representing South Africa
World Games
Silver medal – second place	2005 Duisburg	Team competition
Bronze medal – third place	2009 Kaohsiung	Team competition
Commonwealth Games
Bronze medal – third place	2010 Delhi	Team competition

Renfred Leroy Dazel (born 4 May 1981) is a South African rugby union coach and former player.

== Biography ==
Raised in Paarl, Dazel was educated at Paulus Joubert Secondary School.

Dazel competed in the Currie Cup for the Boland Cavaliers and played on the South Africa national rugby sevens team from 2005 to 2012. He represented South Africa at two Commonwealth Games, won a IRB Sevens World Series title in 2008–09 and was one of the nominees for the 2009 IRB Men's Sevens Player of the Year.

After retiring as a player, Dazel made the transition into coaching. He was appointed full-time coach of the South Africa women's national rugby sevens team in 2023, having previously held the role from 2013 to 2017.
