= Collins Injera =

Kenya international rugby union player

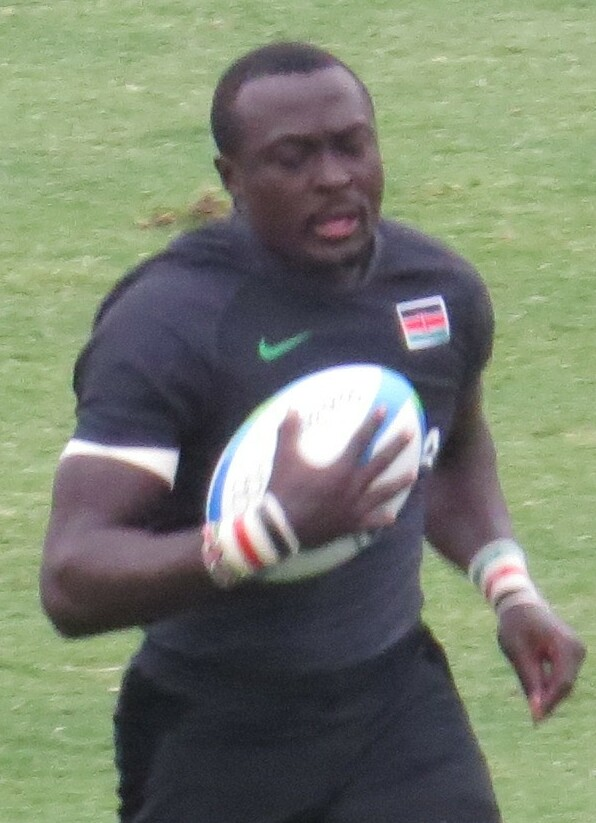
- Born: Collins Injera, 18 October 1986 (age 40) Nairobi, Kenya
- Height: 186 cm (6 ft 1 in)
- Weight: 96 kg (212 lb)
- School: Vihiga High School
- University: Daystar University
- Notable relative(s): Humphrey Kayange (brother); Michael Agevi (brother)

Rugby union career
- Position: Utility Back
Senior career
Years	Team	Apps	(Points)
	Mwamba Rugby Club		(0)
International career
Years	Team	Apps	(Points)
2014–2018	Kenya	6	(0)
National sevens team
Years	Team		Comps
2006–2022	Kenya		424 (1443 pts)

Official website
- https://instagram.com/cinjera

Collins Injera, OGW, OLY (born 18 October 1986) is a former Kenyan rugby player. He holds third place for the number of tries scored on the World Rugby Sevens Series with 279. He is known for his achievements with Kenyan national rugby sevens team.

== Career ==
Injera started playing rugby while at Vihiga High School in Vihiga. After graduation in 2005, he joined military team Ulinzi RFC playing in the Kenya Cup league. The team was later disbanded, and he moved to Mwamba RFC, a Nairobi-based team where he plays as a wing.

Now a strong player for the Kenyan Sevens squad, Injera debuted with the team at the 2006 Dubai Sevens and played in the 2009 Rugby World Cup Sevens, where Kenya reached the semifinals. He became the top try scorer for the 2008–09 IRB Sevens World Series season with 42 tries. He also scored 210 points and finished second behind Ben Gollings of England in the individual points table.

Injera has also played for the Kenya national rugby union team (15s) at his usual position left wing (number 11), playing at the 2011 World Cup Qualifiers.

In February 2013, Injera was dropped from the Kenya national sevens team and his contract was cancelled by the head coach Mike Friday. This was because of a conflict between Injera's club Mwamba RFC and the Kenya national sevens team. This conflict led to Injera missing training sessions with the Kenya national sevens team and therefore breaching his contract. As a consequence of this breach, Injera's contract was cancelled.

In celebrating his 200th career try in the World Rugby Series, Collins Injera autographed a rugby ball and a camera lens using a permanent marker, in a pre-mediatated move that ended up ruining the costly camera. The try was scored during Kenya's match against Japan, at Twickenham Stadium in 2015, a game that Kenya won with a 24–12 scoreline.

In 2022, He was recalled into the Kenyan squad for the Rugby World Cup Sevens in Cape Town. He announced his retirement from rugby in January 2023.

Currently, Collins Injera serves as a Liaison Officer in the office of the Clerk of the Senate of Kenya. He got recruited, in mid-2023, through the Parliamentary Service Commission.

== Awards ==
Injera was nominated for the 2008–09 IRB Sevens Player of the Year award, which was eventually won by Ollie Phillips (rugby union). Injera won the Kenyan Sportsman of the Year award in 2009. In 2010, Injera was awarded the presidential Order of Golden Warriors (OGW) alongside his brother Humphrey Kayange for their performance in the 2008–09 IRB Sevens World Series. Collins Injera was named Player of the final in 2016 Singapore Sevens, after helping Kenya to win their first tournament in World Sevens Series.

In January 2023, Collins Injera was inducted into Fiji's Rugby Town Walk of Fame, during the Coral Coast Sevens at Lawaqa Park in Sigatoka, Fiji. He is also the second African player to be feted with the honor of being an official ambassador for the 2023 McDonalds Coral Coast Sevens, after Bryan Habana of South Africa in 2019.

Collins was inducted to the Melrose Sevens Hall of Fame in April 2023. The induction was an honor to his rugby career achievements over the years.

== Personal life ==
Injera's older brother Humphrey Kayange is a former captain of the Kenyan sevens squad. Their younger brother Michael Agevi has also played rugby for the Sevens team in the past.

Injera has a degree in mass communication from Kenya College for Communication Technology (KCCT). He is an alumnus of Daystar University.

Collins Injera is married to Chebet Limo.
