= Kenya national rugby sevens team =

Kenya
- Union: Kenya Rugby Union
- Emblem: The African lion
- Coach: Kevin Wambua
- Captain: George Ooro
- Most caps: Collins Injera (79)
- Top scorer: Collins Injera (1,443)
- Most tries: Collins Injera (279)
Team kit

World Cup Sevens
- Appearances: 6 (First in 2001)
- Best result: 3rd place (2009)

Official website
- www.kru.co.ke

The Kenya national rugby sevens team competes in the World Rugby Sevens Series, Rugby World Cup Sevens and the Commonwealth Games. Kenya recorded its first tournament win in the World Rugby Sevens Series after beating Fiji at the 2016 Singapore Sevens. Kenya has also been successful in the Rugby World Cup Sevens, reaching the semifinals in 2009 and again in 2013.

The Kenya Sevens team is sometimes referred to by the Kenyan and international press as Shujaa, a Swahili word meaning courage, confidence, bravery, or heroism. The Kenya national rugby sevens team is one of the more successful sporting teams representing Kenya. They have won the men's Team of the Year category six times at the Kenyan Sports Personality of the Year Awards: 2004, 2007, 2008, 2009, 2013, and 2016.

Kenya won the first round of the 2024 World Rugby Sevens Challenger Series in Dubai. They were runners-up in the overall series and qualified for the SVNS promotion and relegation play-off competition at the 2024 Spain Sevens.

== Honors ==
- Main Cup winners at the 2016 Singapore Sevens
- Main cup finalists at the
  - 2009 Adelaide Sevens
  - 2013 Wellington Sevens
  - 2018 Canada Sevens
  - 2018 Hong Kong Sevens

== World Rugby Sevens Series ==
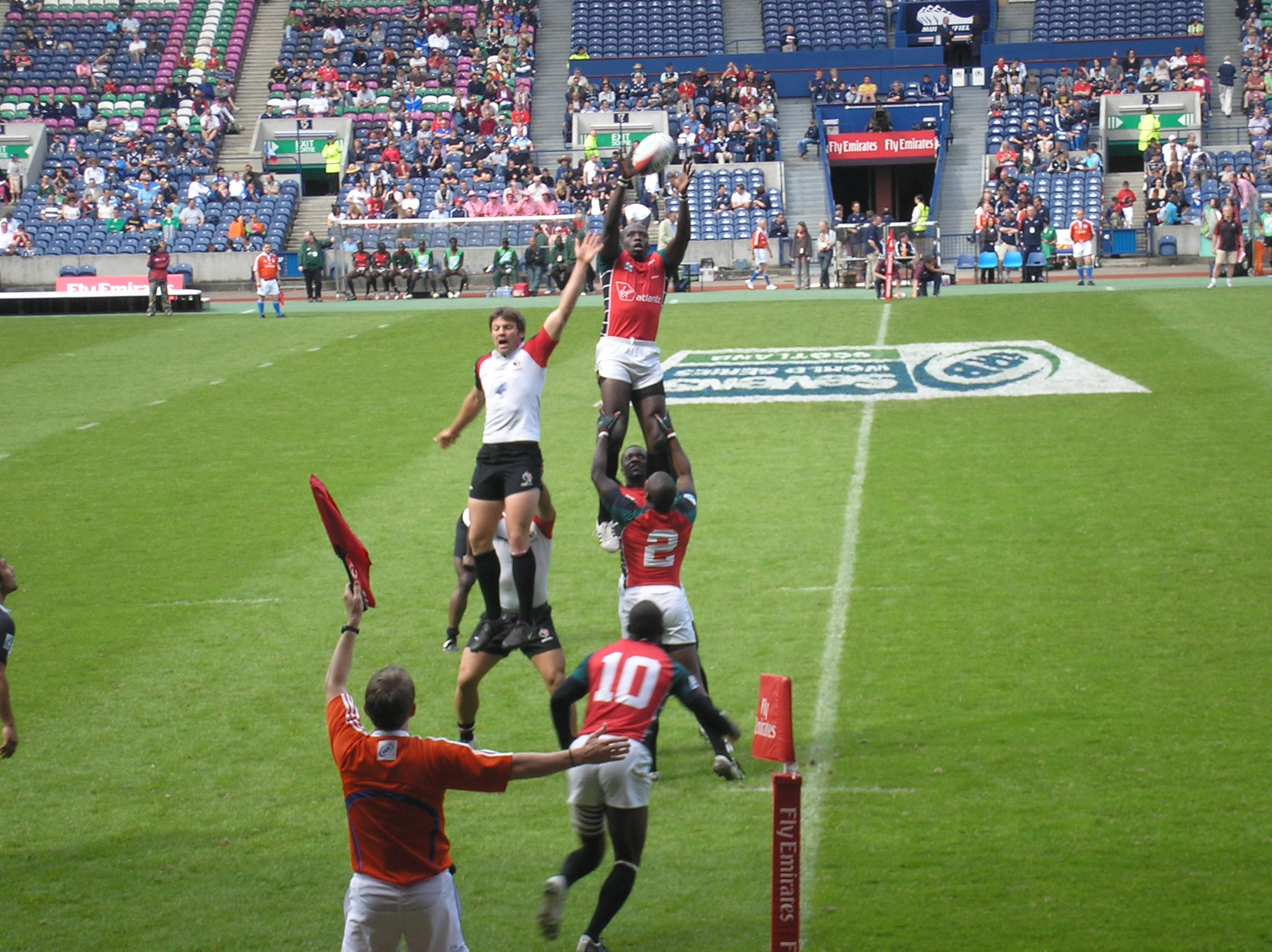
A line-out during the 2008 Edinburgh Sevens

Kenya has competed in the World Series every year since the competition's inception in 1999–2000. Kenya's best season came in 2012–13 when they finished fifth in the Series. Collins Injera and Humphrey Kayange were both nominated for World Rugby Sevens Player of the Year in 2009, but lost to England's Ollie Phillips.

World Series record
Season	Position	Most tries	Most points
1999–00	20th		
2000–01	23rd		
2001–02	23rd		
2002–03	10th	Dennis Mwanja (6)	Oscar Osir (79)
2003–04	11th	Oscar Osir (28)	Oscar Osir (158)
2004–05	10th	Allan Makaka (17)	Allan Makaka (87)
2005–06	9th	Sidney Ashioya (18)	Lavin Asego (163)
2006–07	11th	Innocent Simiyu (19)	Innocent Simiyu (115)
2007–08	7th	Collins Injera (18)	Collins Injera (92)
2008–09	6th	Collins Injera (42)	Collins Injera (210)
2009–10	8th	Humphrey Kayange (33)	Lavin Asego (173)
2010–11	9th	Humphrey Kayange (31)	Humphrey Kayange (157)
2011–12	12th	Willy Ambaka (16)	Lavin Asego (81)
2012–13	5th	Willy Ambaka (24)	Willy Ambaka (120)
2013–14	7th	Collins Injera (30)	Collins Injera (166)
2014–15	13th	Billy Odhiambo (20)	Billy Odhiambo (100)
2015–16	7th	Collins Injera (32)	Collins Injera (172)
2016–17	12th	Billy Odhiambo (22)	Billy Odhiambo/Samuel Oliech (110)
2017–18	8th	Willy Ambaka (31)	Willy Ambaka (155)
2018–19	13th	Vincent Onyala (22)	Daniel Taabu (157)
2019–20	12th		
2021	3rd	Alvin Otieno (11)	Alvin Otieno (55)
2021–22	12th		
2022–23	13th		
Total		Collins Injera (279)	Collins Injera (1,443)

== Tournament history ==
=== Summer Olympic Games ===
Olympic Games record
Year	Round	Position	Pld	W	L	D	Qualifying
(Brazil) 2016	Placement round	11th	5	1	4	0	Won the 2015 Africa Cup Sevens
(Japan) 2020	Placement round	9th	5	2	3	0	Won the 2019 Africa Men's Sevens
(France) 2024	Placement round	9th	5	2	3	0	Won the 2023 Africa Men's Sevens
Total	Placement round	3/3	15	5	10	0	

Olympic Games History
2016	Pool stage	Kenya 7 – 31 Great Britain	Loss
2016	Pool stage	Kenya 5 – 28 New Zealand	Loss
2016	Pool stage	Kenya 7 – 31 Japan	Loss
2016	9–12th place semifinal	Kenya 12 – 14 Spain	Loss
2016	Eleventh place playoff	Kenya 24 – 0 Brazil	Win
2020	Pool stage	Kenya 14 – 19 United States	Loss
2020	Pool stage	Kenya 5 – 14 South Africa	Loss
2020	Pool stage	Kenya 7 – 12 Ireland	Loss
2020	9–12th place semifinal	Kenya 21 – 7 Japan	Win
2020	Ninth place playoff	Kenya 22 – 0 Ireland	Win
2024	Pool stage	Kenya 12 – 31 Argentina	Loss
2024	Pool stage	Kenya 7 – 21 Australia	Loss
2024	Pool stage	Kenya 0 – 26 Samoa	Loss
2024	9–12th place semifinal	Kenya 19 – 14 Uruguay	Win
2024	Ninth place playoff	Kenya 10 – 5 Samoa	Win

=== Rugby World Cup Sevens ===
World Cup record
Tournament	Round	Position	Played	Won	Lost	Drew	Most tries
(Scotland) 1993	Did not qualify						
(Hong Kong) 1997	Did not qualify						
(Argentina) 2001	Bowl Semifinals	=19th	7	1	6	0	
(Hong Kong) 2005	Bowl Semifinals	=19th	7	3	4	0	Lucas Onyango (6)
(United Arab Emirates) 2009	Semifinals	=3rd	5	3	2	0	Collins Injera (5)
(Russia) 2013	Semifinals	4th	6	4	2	0	Humphrey Kayange (6)
(United States) 2018	Challenge quarterfinals	16th	5	1	4	0	Jeffrey Oluoch (4)
(South Africa) 2022	11th Place Final	12th	4	1	3	0	Vincent Onyala (4)
Total	0 Titles	6/8	34	13	21	0	C. Injera & H. Kayange (9)

=== Commonwealth Games ===
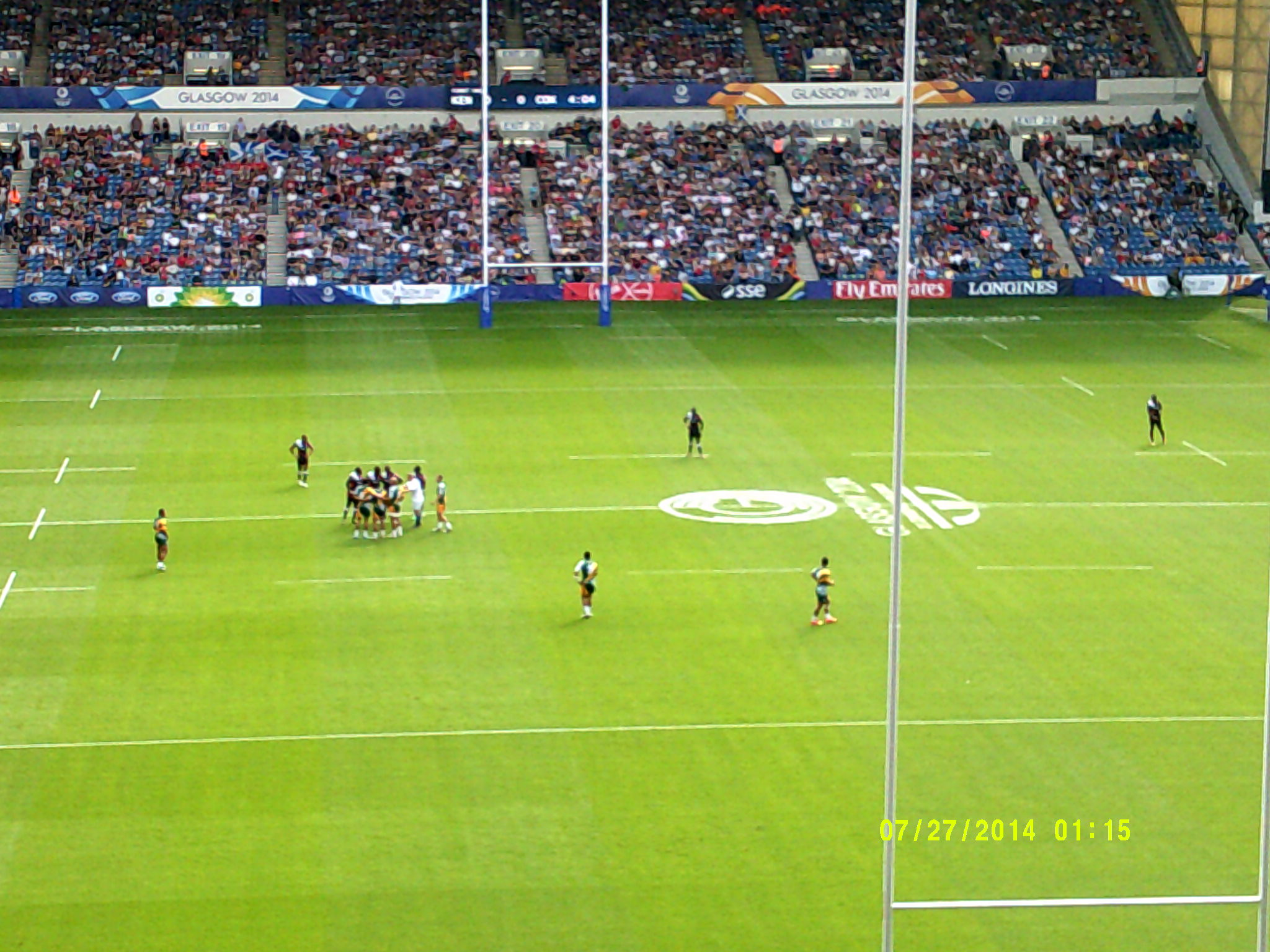
Kenya playing the Cook Islands at 2014 Commonwealth Games

Commonwealth record
Year	Round	Position	Pld	W	L	D
(Malaysia) 1998	Bowl Quarterfinals	13th	5	0	5	0
(England) 2002	Bowl Semifinals	11th	5	2	3	0
(Australia) 2006	Bowl Champions	9th	6	4	2	0
(India) 2010	Plate Semifinals	7th	5	3	2	0
(Scotland) 2014	Plate Semifinals	7th	5	2	3	0
(Australia) 2018	Placement round	8th	5	2	3	0
(England) 2022	Placement round	=7th	4	2	2	0
Total	0 Titles	7/7	35	15	20	0

=== Africa Men's Sevens ===
Africa Men's Sevens record
Year	Round	Position	Pld	W	L	D
(Zimbabwe) 2000	Finals	2nd	7	5	2	0
(Zambia) 2004	Champions	1st	5	5	0	0
(Tunisia) 2008	Champions	1st	5	5	0	0
(Morocco) 2012	Did Not Compete					
(Kenya) 2013	Champions	1st	6	6	0	0
(Zimbabwe) 2014	Finals	2nd	7	5	2	0
(South Africa) 2015	Champions	1st	6	6	0	0
(Kenya) 2016	Semifinals	3rd	4	3	1	0
(Uganda) 2017	Did Not Compete					
(Tunisia) 2018	Finals	2nd	5	4	1	0
(South Africa) 2019	Champions	1st	6	6	0	0
(Uganda) 2022	Semifinals	3rd	6	4	2	0
(Zimbabwe) 2023	Champions	1st	6	6	0	0
Total	6 Titles	11/13	63	55	8	0

=== Safari Sevens ===
Kenya has won the Safari Sevens ten times:

- 1997 versus Cumbria Schoolboys 24–27,
- 2000 Kenya 'A' (Shujaa) won, defeating Bristol University RFC, 26–24
- 2003 versus Emerging Springboks 29–7,
- 2004 versus Emerging Springboks 10–7,
- 2008 versus Zimbabwe 35–12,
- 2009 versus Emerging Springboks 40–19,
- 2010 versus Emerging Springboks 17–12,
- 2014 versus Australia Renegades 40–7,
- 2016 versus Samurai International 38–21
- 2019 versus Springbok Sevens 19–12.

== Players ==
=== Current squad ===
The following team was announced as the 2022 Rugby World Cup Sevens sevens team.

Head coach: Damian McGrath

No.	Player	Date of birth (age)
1	Billy Odhiambo	7 November 1993 (aged 28)
2	Jeff Oluoch	2 April 1995 (aged 27)
3	Anthony Omondi	26 March 1995 (aged 27)
4	Herman Humwa	8 November 1995 (aged 26)
5	Nelson Oyoo (captain)	26 June 1994 (aged 28)
6	Johnstone Olindi	4 November 1999 (aged 22)
7	Edmund Anya	15 June 1998 (aged 24)
8	Willy Ambaka	14 May 1990 (aged 32)
9	Vincent Onyala	10 December 1996 (aged 25)
10	Collins Injera	18 October 1986 (aged 35)
11	Kevin Wekesa	7 August 2000 (aged 22)
12	Samuel Oliech	15 December 1993 (aged 28)

=== KAISSO U18 Team ===
No.	Player	Position	School
1	Liam Copeland	Loosehead Prop	Riara University
2	Yonas Anderson	Loosehead Prop	International School of Kenya
3	Bryson Njoroge	Loosehead Prop	Strathmore School
4	Josiah Webster	Hooker	International School of Kenya
5	Sheriff Sesay	Hooker	Braeside Garden Estate
6	Spencer Finley	Tighthead Prop	Riara University
7	Aaron Thomas	Tighthead Prop	Hillcrest International Schools
8	Shawn Mathenge	Lock	Strathmore School
9	Louis Kithomi	Lock	Strathmore School
10	Adrian Madara	Lock	Oshwal SNR High
11	Rohan Neel Shah	Scrum Half	International School of Kenya
12	Andrew Kimani	Scrum Half	Strathmore School
13	Joshua Lamax	Fly Half	Peponi School
14	Kakai Simuyi	Fly Half	Strathmore School
15	Mostaff Toinatswa	Blind Wing	St. Christopher's
16	Mark Mitsanze	Blind Wing	Strathmore School
17	Andrew Wachira	Open Wing	International School of Kenya

=== KAISSO U16 Team ===
No.	Player	Position	School
1	Mugita Essendi	Loosehead Prop	Peponi School
2	Adam Kipchumba	Loosehead Prop	St. Andrew's Turi
3	Luca Hoyer	Loosehead Prop	Braeburn Garden Estate
4	Jayden Ceruiyot	Loosehead Prop	St. Andrew's Turi
5	Reagan Peter Kiplimo	Hooker	Peponi School
6	Sean Naan	Hooker	Hillcrest International Schools
7	Wayne Njoroge	Tighthead Prop	Peponi School
8	Jonathan Njuguna	Tighthead Prop	Hillcrest School
9	Murad Dadashev	Tighthead Prop	International School of Kenya
10	Jewel MJ Kirabira (Vice Captain)	Scrumhalf	Braeburn School
11	Nathan Vanswegen	Fly Half	Peponi School
12	Samuel Sesay	Fly Half	Braeburn School
13	Arthur Bailey (Captain)	Fly Half	International School of Kenya
14	Tegwende Soubeiga	Winger	St. Andrew's Turi
15	Danvas Mwangi	Centre	Dawamu School
16	Jesee Otieno	Winger	Braeburn School
17	Matthew Bailey	Winger	Hillcrest International School
18	Sotei Lopokoiyot	Winger	St. Andrew's Turi
19	Okumu Caesar	Center	Strathmore School
20	Felix Braun	Centre	International School of Kenya
21	Teshale Waire	Centre	Peponi School

=== Former squads ===
Kenya team to the 2009 Rugby World Cup Sevens

Head coach: Benjamin Ayimba

1. Humphrey Kayange
2. Allan Onyango
3. Victor Oduor
4. Ben Nyambu
5. Wilson Opondo
6. Lavin Asego
7. Biko Adema
8. Innocent Simiyu
9. Collins Injera
10. Sidney Ashioya
11. Gibson Weru
12. Horace Otieno
Kenya team to the 2013 Rugby World Cup Sevens

Coach: (England) Mike Friday

1. Horace Otieno
2. Oscar Ouma Achieng
3. Patrice Agunda
4. Felix Ayange
5. Eden Agero
6. Humphrey Kayange
7. Biko Adema
8. Andrew Amonde (c)
9. Michael Wanjala
10. Lavin Asego
11. Collins Injera
12. Willy Ambaka
Kenya squad for the 2017–18 World Sevens Series

Coach: Innocent Simiyu

Kenya team members 2017–18
Player	Position	Affiliation	Number									
Player	Position	Affiliation	Dubai	Cape Town	Sydney	Hamilton	Las Vegas	Vancouver	Hong Kong	Singapore	London	Paris
Eden Agero	Forward	SportPesa Quins	7	13	6	7	7	7	7	7	7	
Willy Ambaka	Forward	SportPesa Quins	12	12	12	12	12	12	12	12	12	
Andrew Amonde	Forward	KCB	–	–	7	8	8	8	8	8	8	
Oscar Ayodi	Back	Homeboyz	**1**	**1**	–	–	–	–	–	–	1	
Herman Humwa	Back	SportPesa Quins	4	4	–	–	–	–	–	13	3	
Collins Injera	Back	Mwamba	11	–	–	–	11	11	11	11	11	
Augustine Lugonzo	Back	Homeboyz	–	–	13	4	–	–	13	4	4	
Ian Minjire	Back	Impala Saracens	–	–	–	–	–	–	4	1	–	
Samuel Ngethe	Back		–	11	4	13	13	4	–	–	13	
Billy Odhiambo	Back	Strathmore University	–	–	–	–	5	5	5	5	5	
Samuel Oliech	Back	Impala Saracens	5	5	9	10	10	10	–	10	–	
Jeffery Oluoch	Forward	Homeboyz	8	8	5	6	6	6	6	6	6	
Dennis Ombachi	Forward	Nondescripts	6	–	–	–	–	–	–	–	–	
Erick Ombasa	Back	Oilers	–	–	–	5	4	13	–	–	2	
Oscar Ouma	Forward	Nakuru	–	3	**3**	**3**	**3**	**3**	**3**	**3**	–	
Arthur Owira	Back	KCB	–	7	1	1	1	1	1	–	–	
Nelson Oyoo	Forward	Nakuru	8	8	7	8	9	9	9	9	9	
Daniel Sikuta	Back	Kabras	2	2	2	2	2	2	2	2	–	
Brian Tanga	Forward	Kabras	10	10	11	11	–	–	–	–	10	
Frank Wanyama	Forward	SportPesa Quins	3	6	10	–	–	–	–	–	–	

Kenya team to the 2018 Rugby World Cup Sevens

Head coach: Innocent Simiyu

No.	Pos.	Player	Date of birth (age)	Union / Club
1	BK	Oscar Ayodi (c)	21 September 1989 (aged 28)	Homeboyz
2	BK	Herman Humwa	8 November 1995 (aged 22)	Kenya Harlequin
3	BK	Samuel Ng'ethe	15 May 1995 (aged 23)	Oilers
4	FW	Brian Tanga	13 September 1995 (aged 22)	Kabras Sugar
5	FW	Dennis Ombachi	14 December 1994 (aged 23)	Nondescripts
6	FW	Jeffery Oluoch	2 April 1995 (aged 23)	Homeboyz
7	BK	Eden Agero	17 September 1990 (aged 27)	Kenya Harlequin
8	FW	Andrew Amonde	25 December 1983 (aged 34)	KCB
9	FW	Nelson Oyoo	26 June 1994 (aged 24)	Nakuru
10	BK	Samuel Oliech	15 December 1993 (aged 24)	Impala Saracens
11	BK	Collins Injera	18 October 1986 (aged 31)	Mwamba
12	FW	Willy Ambaka	14 May 1990 (aged 28)	Kenya Harlequin

=== Player records ===
The following refers to statistics generated in the World Rugby Sevens Series. Players in bold are still active. Collins Injera was briefly ranked the #1 player in the world in tries scored, until his try-scoring record was surpassed by England's Dan Norton.

Most tries
No.	Player	Tries
1	**Collins Injera**	279
2	Humphrey Kayange	159
3	**Willy Ambaka**	123

Most points
No.	Player	Points
1	**Collins Injera**	1,443
2	Lavin Asego	1,026
3	Humphrey Kayange	799

Most matches
No.	Player	Matches
1	**Collins Injera**	424
2	**Andrew Amonde**	358
3	Humphrey Kayange	331

=== Award winners ===
The following Kenya Sevens players have been recognised at the World Rugby Awards since 2004:

World Rugby Men's 7s Player of the Year
Year	Nominees	Winners
2009	Collins Injera	—
2009	Humphrey Kayange	—

== See also ==
- Rugby union in Kenya
- Kenya national rugby union team
- Kenya Rugby Union
