= 2016–17 United States national rugby sevens team season =

United States
2016–17 season

The United States national rugby sevens team began the 2016-17 World Rugby Sevens Series slowly, sitting in 11th place after the first three rounds. The U.S. was missing certain key players from the previous season. The U.S. turned things around mid-season. In the second half of the season, the team for the first time reached four consecutive semifinals: first at the USA Sevens where the U.S. finished third; then at the Canada Sevens where Perry Baker scored 9 tries including his 100th career try; followed by Hong Kong and Singapore. The U.S. finished the season in fifth place overall, a record high for the team.

Perry Baker and Danny Barrett were both selected to the 2016-17 Dream Team.

== Tournament results ==
Leg	Date	Finish	Record (W-L-D)	Leading Try Scorer	Leading Points Scorer	Dream Team selection
Dubai	December 2016	9th	4–2	Perry Baker (5)	Madison Hughes (39)	—
South Africa	December 2016	T–7th	2–3	Perry Baker (5)	Perry Baker (25)	—
New Zealand	January 2017	T–11th	2–2–1	Baker & Barrett (3)	Madison Hughes (23)	—
Australia	February 2017	6th	3–3	Carlin Isles (5)	Madison Hughes (24)	Danny Barrett
United States	March 2017	3rd	4–2	Danny Barrett (5)	Danny Barrett (25)	Danny Barrett
Canada	March 2017	4th	4–2	Perry Baker (9)	Perry Baker (45)	Perry Baker
Hong Kong	April 2017	4th	4–2	Perry Baker (9)	Perry Baker (45)	Baker & Pinkelman
Singapore	April 2017	2nd	4–2	Baker & Tomasin (8)	Baker & Tomasin (40)	Baker, Barrett & Tomasin
France	May 2017	5th	4–2	Perry Baker (8)	Perry Baker (40)	-
England	May 2017	4th	3–3	Perry Baker (8)	Perry Baker (40)	Perry Baker
Totals		5th		Perry Baker (57)	Perry Baker (285)	Baker (4), Barrett (3)

=== Player statistics ===
Perry Baker was the season's leading try scorer (57) and points scorer (285) on the Series. Madison Hughes ranked third in points (279).

The following table shows the players who appeared in at least 12 matches for the U.S. during the 2016–17 Sevens Series season.

Leading U.S. players (2016–17 WS season)
Player	Matches	Tackles	Tries	Points
Stephen Tomasin	57	156	27	171
Madison Hughes	49	143	13	279
Folau Niua	57	91	10	58
Perry Baker	53	82	57	285
Ben Pinkelman	35	73	11	55
Martin Iosefo	55	66	19	95
Andrew Durutalo	54	64	13	67
Maka Unufe	47	60	14	70
Danny Barrett	42	44	22	110
Matai Leuta	40	27	3	15
Mike Te'o	13	22	5	29
Don Pati	18	11	3	15
