= 2017–18 United States national rugby sevens team season =

United States
2017–18 season

The 2017–18 United States national rugby sevens team season included both the 2017–18 World Rugby Sevens Series and the 2018 Rugby World Cup Sevens. The season began badly. In the first tournament of the 2017–18 World Rugby Sevens Series in Dubai, 2017 World Rugby Player of the Year Perry Baker suffered a concussion, and the United States team limped to a last place finish. The U.S. improved from that point on, reaching the semifinals of the Australia Sevens. The team then won the 2018 USA Sevens, the first time the U.S. won their home tournament, boosted in large part by Perry Baker, who led all scorers with 8 tries. Baker, along with forwards Ben Pinkelman and Danny Barrett all made the tournament Dream Team. Overall the team displayed inconsistent performances, reaching the Cup semifinals three times, but also failing to qualify for the cup quarterfinals three times. Despite the inconsistent play, the U.S. finished sixth overall.

== 2017–18 World Sevens Series ==
2017–18 Season
Leg	Date	Finish	Record (W-L-D)	Leading Try Scorer	Leading Points Scorer	Dream Team selection
Dubai	December 2017	15th	0–5	Carlin Isles (3)	Carlin Isles (15)	—
South Africa	December 2017	6th	4–2	Carlin Isles (6)	Madison Hughes (37)	—
Australia	January 2018	4th	3–3	Perry Baker (9)	Perry Baker (45)	Ben Pinkelman
New Zealand	February 2018	9th	4–1–1	Perry Baker (8)	Perry Baker (40)	—
United States	March 2018	1st	6–0	Perry Baker (8)	Perry Baker (40)	Pinkelman, Barrett, Baker
Canada	March 2018	4th	3–3	Perry Baker (7)	Perry Baker (37)	Perry Baker
Hong Kong	April 2018	6th	3-2-1	Carlin Isles (7)	Carlin Isles (35)	—
Singapore	April 2018	9th	4–2	Carlin Isles (8)	Carlin Isles (40)	—
England	June 2018	6th	3-2-1	Carlin Isles (8)	Carlin Isles (40)	—
France	June 2018	6th	3-2-1	Carlin Isles (6)	Carlin Isles (30)	—

=== Player statistics ===
The following table shows the leading players for the U.S. after the 2017–18 Sevens Series season. Among all World Series, players, Isles ranked first in tries scored with 49, and Baker ranked fifth with 37. Ben Pinkelman ranked fourth in tackles with 124 and fourth in matches played with 58.

Leading U.S. players (2017–18 WS season)
Player	Position	Matches	Tackles	Tries
Ben Pinkelman	Forward	58	124	11
Matai Leuta	Forward	46	82	8
Martin Iosefo	Back	55	80	22
Folau Niua	Halfback	52	80	9
Stephen Tomasin	Forward	38	67	15
Madison Hughes	Halfback	23	61	5
Perry Baker	Back	30	58	37
Danny Barrett	Forward	49	56	17
Kevon Williams	Halfback	47	52	14
Carlin Isles	Back	53	40	49
Maka Unufe	Back	33	36	9
Malon Aljiboori	Forward	30	19	2

Source: World Rugby website.

=== 2018 USA Sevens ===
The United States won the tournament by beating Argentina 28–0 in the final. This was the first time that the United States won its home tournament. USA's Perry Baker led the tournament with 8 tries and 11 breaks. Baker, Pinkelman, and Barrett were all named to the seven-man tournament Dream Team.

2018 USA Sevens final: U.S. starting lineup
Player	Position
Danny Barrett	Forward
Ben Pinkelman	Forward
Matai Leuta	Forward
Folau Niua	Scrum-half
Kevon Williams	Fly-half
Martin Iosefo	Center
Perry Baker	Wing

- Substitutes: Carlin Isles, Malon Aljiboori
- Unavailable due to injury: Madison Hughes, Stephen Tomasin, Maka Unufe

With the U.S. finishing out the game with a lineup that included Isles (wing), Baker (center), Williams (fly-half) and Aljiboori (forward), it is believed that this is the first time the U.S. has fielded a team where the majority of players are African-American.

== 2018 Rugby World Cup Sevens ==
Semi-finals
22 July 2018 – 11:56 – AT&T Park
Scotland	0
United States	28
22 July 2018 – 12:18 – AT&T Park
Argentina	26
France	15

5th Place Final
22 July 2018 – 17:02 – AT&T Park
United States	7
Argentina	33
7th Place
22 July 2018 – 16:40 – AT&T Park
Scotland	29 (a.e.t)
France	24

Round of 16

20 July 2018	(5) United States	35–0	Wales (12)	AT&T Park
21:37				Referee: Rasta Rasivhenge (South Africa)

Quarterfinals

21 July 2018	(5) United States	19–24	England (4)	AT&T Park
16:38				Referee: Rasta Rasivhenge (South Africa)

5th place semi-finals

22 July 2018	(5) United States	0–28	Scotland (8)	AT&T Park
11:56				Referee: Jérémy Rozier (France)

5th place final

22 July 2018	(5) United States	7–33	Argentina (7)	AT&T Park
17:02				Referee: Sam Grove-White (Scotland)

No.	Pos.	Player	Date of birth (age)	Union / Club
1	BK	Carlin Isles	November 29, 1989 (aged 28)	Unattached
2	FW	Ben Pinkelman	June 13, 1994 (aged 24)	Denver Barbarians
3	FW	Danny Barrett	March 23, 1990 (aged 28)	Unattached
4	FW	Matai Leuta	July 20, 1990 (aged 28)	Unattached
5	FW	Brett Thompson	August 17, 1990 (aged 27)	Unattached
6	BK	Kevon Williams	June 7, 1991 (aged 27)	Denver Barbarians
7	BK	Folau Niua	January 27, 1985 (aged 33)	Unattached
8	BK	Maka Unufe	September 28, 1991 (aged 26)	Unattached
9	FW	Stephen Tomasin	September 25, 1994 (aged 23)	Unattached
10	BK	Madison Hughes (c)	October 26, 1992 (aged 25)	Unattached
11	BK	Perry Baker	June 29, 1986 (aged 32)	Unattached
12	BK	Martin Iosefo	January 13, 1990 (aged 28)	Unattached
	BK	Chris Mattina	March 31, 1993 (aged 25)	New York Athletic Club
	FW	Pat Blair	January 27, 1990 (aged 28)	Unattached

Head coach: Mike Friday

== See also ==
- 2018 Rugby World Cup Sevens – Women's tournament
