= 2019 Pacific Rugby Premiership season =

2019 PRP Season
- Countries: United States
- Number of teams: 6
- Champions: Life West Gladiators
- Runners-up: Belmont Shore

The 2019 Pacific Rugby Premiership Season was the fifth edition of the competition. Life West Gladiators defeated Belmont Shore 36–27 to win the championship.

== Standings ==
Teams	P	W	D	L	PF	PA	PD	BT	BL	Pts
Life West Gladiators	10	8	0	2	442	310	132	9	0	41
Belmont Shore	10	8	0	2	344	190	154	7	0	39
Glendale Merlins	10	5	1	4	297	316	-19	7	0	29
Old Mission Beach Athletic Club	10	3	1	6	277	326	-49	5	1	20
Santa Monica	10	3	0	7	257	337	-80	5	3	20
San Francisco Golden Gate	10	2	0	8	238	369	-131	5	2	15

== Regular season ==
=== Round 1 ===
January 26

Life West Gladiators	45–18	San Francisco Golden Gate

January 26

Belmont Shore	19–33	Old Mission Beach Athletic Club

January 26

Glendale Merlins	7–44	Santa Monica

=== Round 2 ===
February 2

Old Mission Beach Athletic Club	30–59	Life West Gladiators

February 2

Santa Monica	19–14	San Francisco Golden Gate

February 2

Glendale Merlins	7–18	Belmont Shore

=== Round 3 ===
February 16

Belmont Shore	31–9	Santa Monica

February 16

San Francisco Golden Gate	21–36	Old Mission Beach Athletic Club

February 16

Glendale Merlins	22–34	Life West Gladiators

=== Round 4 ===
February 23

Life West Gladiators	24–47	Belmont Shore

February 23

Old Mission Beach Athletic Club	19–34	Santa Monica

February 23

San Francisco Golden Gate	22–43	Glendale Merlins

=== Round 5 ===
March 9

Life West Gladiators	29–26	Santa Monica

March 9

San Francisco Golden Gate	0–51	Belmont Shore

March 9

Glendale Merlins	10–10	Old Mission Beach Athletic Club

=== Round 6 ===
March 16

Old Mission Beach Athletic Club	15–45	Belmont Shore

March 16

San Francisco Golden Gate	36–52	Life West Gladiators

March 16

Santa Monica	37–43	Glendale Merlins

=== Round 7 ===
March 23

Life West Gladiators	40–37	Old Mission Beach Athletic Club

March 23

Belmont Shore	24–49	Glendale Merlins

March 23

San Francisco Golden Gate	36–29	Santa Monica

=== Round 8 ===
March 30

Belmont Shore	30–19	Life West Gladiators

March 30

Santa Monica	40–17	Old Mission Beach Athletic Club

March 30

Glendale Merlins	42–33	San Francisco Golden Gate

=== Round 9 ===
April 13

Life West Gladiators	59–31	Glendale Merlins

April 13

Old Mission Beach Athletic Club	38–24	San Francisco Golden Gate

April 13

Santa Monica	14–39	Belmont Shore

=== Round 10 ===
April 27

Belmont Shore	38–20	San Francisco Golden Gate

April 27

Old Mission Beach Athletic Club	31–43	Glendale Merlins

April 27

Santa Monica	31–79	Life West Gladiators

== Playoffs ==
=== 5th Place Final ===
May 4

Santa Monica	ATWO	San Francisco Golden Gate

- Santa Monica forfeited the match, citing lack of player numbers. San Francisco Golden Gate awarded win.

=== 3rd Place Final ===
May 4

Glendale Merlins	24–50	Old Mission Beach Athletic Club

=== Final ===
May 4

Life West Gladiators	36–27	Belmont Shore
