= Pacific Rugby Premiership =

United States rugby union club competition

- Sport: Rugby union
- First season: 2014; 12 years ago
- Country: United States
- Most recent champion: Life West Gladiators (2019)
- Most titles: Glendale Raptors (2 titles)

The Pacific Rugby Premiership (officially called the Samurai Sportswear Pacific Rugby Premiership for sponsorship reasons) was a club rugby competition in the USA. It served as the Division I league for the Pacific North Conference, but also included one team from the Frontier Conference. It involved six teams from cities across the Western region and represented over 100 years of rugby history and heritage.

The PRP had a short hiatus in 2017, but returned in 2018. The last full season played was 2019, with 4 games played in 2020.

== Teams ==
=== 2019 Teams ===
Club	Location	Stadium	Joined	Coach
Life West Gladiators	Hayward, California		N/A	
Belmont Shore	Long Beach, California	CSU Long Beach Rugby Field	N/A	Ray Egan
Glendale Merlins	Glendale, Colorado	Infinity Park	N/A	Luke Gross
Old Mission Beach Athletic Club	San Diego, California	San Diego Stadium	N/A	Jason Wood
Santa Monica	Santa Monica, California	Westchester Enriched Sciences Magnets	N/A	Steve Stagg
San Francisco Golden Gate	San Francisco, California	Ray Sheeran Field	N/A	Neil Foote

=== Former Teams ===
Club	Location	Stadium	Joined	Left
Denver Barbarians	Denver, Colorado	Infinity Park	N/A	N/A
Olympic Club RFC	San Francisco, California			

== Champions ==
=== By Year ===
Year	Teams	Champion	Score	Runner-up
2014	7	San Francisco Golden Gate	39–38	Glendale Raptors
2015	7	Glendale Raptors	25–11	San Francisco Golden Gate
2016	7	Glendale Raptors	44–20	San Francisco Golden Gate
2017	Went on hiatus			
2018	6	Belmont Shore	54–29	Old Mission Beach Athletic Club
2019	6	Life West Gladiators	36–27	Belmont Shore
2020	4	Suspended and Canceled due to the COVID-19 pandemic		
2021	0	Suspended and Canceled due to the COVID-19 pandemic		

=== By Team ===
Team	Titles	Runner-up
Glendale Raptors	2	1
San Francisco Golden Gate	1	2
Belmont Shore	1	1
Life West Gladiators	1	0
Old Mission Beach Athletic Club	0	1
