= 2017 Sydney Sevens =

- Sevens World Series XVIII
- Host nation: Australia
- Date: 4–5 February 2017

Cup
- Champion: South Africa
- Runner-up: England
- Third: New Zealand

Challenge
- Winner: Russia

Tournament details
- Matches played: 45 top point scorer =

The 2017 Sydney Sevens was the fourteenth edition of the Australian Sevens tournament, the second of which to be held in Sydney, and the fourth tournament of the 2016–17 World Rugby Sevens Series. The tournament was played on 4–5 February 2017 at Allianz Stadium in Sydney, Australia.

== Format ==
The teams were drawn into four pools of four teams each. Each team played all the others in their pool once. The top two teams from each pool advanced to the Cup quarter finals. The bottom two teams from each group advanced to the Challenge Trophy quarter finals.

== Teams ==
The fifteen core teams were joined by Papua New Guinea, who qualified via the 2016 Oceania Sevens, for this tournament.

- Argentina
- Australia
- Canada
- England
- Fiji
- France
- Japan
- Kenya
- New Zealand
- Samoa
- Scotland
- South Africa
- Russia
- United States
- Wales
- Papua New Guinea

== Pool stage ==
Key to colours in group tables
Teams that advanced to the Cup Quarterfinal

=== Pool A ===
Team	Pld	W	D	L	PF	PA	PD	Pts
England	3	3	0	0	66	27	+39	9
South Africa	3	2	0	1	61	28	+33	7
Kenya	3	1	0	2	36	45	−9	5
Japan	3	0	0	3	12	75	−63	3

4 February 2017
09:58

England	19–12	Kenya

Sydney Football Stadium, Sydney

4 February 2017
10:20

South Africa	32–0	Japan

Sydney Football Stadium, Sydney

4 February 2017
13:53

England	26–0	Japan

Sydney Football Stadium, Sydney

4 February 2017
14:15

South Africa	14–7	Kenya

Sydney Football Stadium, Sydney

4 February 2017
18:51

Kenya	17–12	Japan

Sydney Football Stadium, Sydney

4 February 2017
19:13

South Africa	15–21	England

Sydney Football Stadium, Sydney

=== Pool B ===
Team	Pld	W	D	L	PF	PA	PD	Pts
Wales	3	2	1	0	49	34	+15	8
Fiji	3	2	0	1	86	35	+51	7
France	3	1	0	2	36	59	−23	5
Samoa	3	0	1	2	21	64	−43	4

4 February 2017
09:14

France	12–14	Wales

Sydney Football Stadium, Sydney

4 February 2017
09:36

Fiji	40–0	Samoa

Sydney Football Stadium, Sydney

4 February 2017
12:20

France	17–14	Samoa

Sydney Football Stadium, Sydney

4 February 2017
12:42

Fiji	15–28	Wales

Sydney Football Stadium, Sydney

4 February 2017
18:07

Wales	7–7	Samoa

Sydney Football Stadium, Sydney

4 February 2017
18:29

Fiji	31–7	France

Sydney Football Stadium, Sydney

=== Pool C ===
Team	Pld	W	D	L	PF	PA	PD	Pts
New Zealand	3	3	0	0	71	28	+43	9
Australia	3	2	0	1	83	47	+36	7
Scotland	3	1	0	2	47	69	−22	5
Papua New Guinea	3	0	0	3	26	83	−57	3

4 February 2017
10:42

New Zealand	26–14	Australia

Sydney Football Stadium, Sydney

4 February 2017
11:04

Scotland	26–12	Papua New Guinea

Sydney Football Stadium, Sydney

4 February 2017
14:37

New Zealand	31–7	Papua New Guinea

Sydney Football Stadium, Sydney

4 February 2017
14:59

Scotland	14–43	Australia

Sydney Football Stadium, Sydney

4 February 2017
19:35

Australia	26–7	Papua New Guinea

Sydney Football Stadium, Sydney

4 February 2017
19:57

Scotland	7–14	New Zealand

Sydney Football Stadium, Sydney

=== Pool D ===
Team	Pld	W	D	L	PF	PA	PD	Pts
United States	3	2	0	1	67	55	+12	7
Argentina	3	1	1	1	57	53	+4	6
Canada	3	1	1	1	48	55	−7	6
Russia	3	1	0	2	38	47	−9	5

4 February 2017
08:30

Argentina	19–22	United States

Sydney Football Stadium, Sydney

4 February 2017
08:52

Canada	12–7	Russia

Sydney Football Stadium, Sydney

4 February 2017
11:36

Argentina	21–14	Russia

Sydney Football Stadium, Sydney

4 February 2017
11:58

Canada	19–31	United States

Sydney Football Stadium, Sydney

4 February 2017
17:23

United States	14–17	Russia

Sydney Football Stadium, Sydney

4 February 2017
17:45

Canada	17–17	Argentina

Sydney Football Stadium, Sydney

== Knockout stage ==
=== 13th place ===
Semi-finals
5 February 2017 – 13:41 – Sydney Football Stadium
Kenya	19
Scotland	14
5 February 2017 – 14:03 – Sydney Football Stadium
Canada	33
Papua New Guinea	20

13th Place Final
5 February 2017 – 16:57 – Sydney Football Stadium
Kenya	5
Canada	10

=== Challenge Trophy ===
Quarter-finals
5 February 2017 – 10:30 – Sydney Football Stadium
Kenya	0
Russia	22
5 February 2017 – 10:52 – Sydney Football Stadium
Scotland	14
Samoa	21
5 February 2017 – 11:14 – Sydney Football Stadium
Canada	7
Japan	19
5 February 2017 – 11:36 – Sydney Football Stadium
France	17
Papua New Guinea	0

Semi-finals
5 February 2017 – 14:25 – Sydney Football Stadium
Russia	17
Samoa	12
5 February 2017 – 14:47 – Sydney Football Stadium
Japan	12
France	19

Thirteenth Place Final
5 February 2017 – 17:24 – Sydney Football Stadium
Russia	26
France	0

=== 5th place ===
Semi-finals
5 February 2017 – 15:09 – Sydney Football Stadium
Argentina	21
Fiji	38
5 February 2017 – 15:31 – Sydney Football Stadium
United States	19
Wales	10

5th Place Final
5 February 2017 – 17:57 – Sydney Football Stadium
Fiji	35
United States	12

=== Cup ===
Quarter-finals
5 February 2017 – 11:58 – Sydney Football Stadium
England	24
Argentina	7
5 February 2017 – 12:20 – Sydney Football Stadium
New Zealand	24
Fiji	21
5 February 2017 – 12:42 – Sydney Football Stadium
United States	10
South Africa	21
5 February 2017 – 13:04 – Sydney Football Stadium
Wales	0
Australia	26

Semi-finals
5 February 2017 – 15:53 – Sydney Football Stadium
England	12
New Zealand	5
5 February 2017 – 16:15 – Sydney Football Stadium
South Africa	26
Australia	12

Cup Final
5 February 2017 – 18:51 – Sydney Football Stadium
England	14
South Africa	29
Bronze Medal Match
5 February 2017 – 18:24 – Sydney Football Stadium
New Zealand	29
Australia	14

== Tournament placings ==
Place	Team	Points
1st place, gold medalist(s)	South Africa	22
2nd place, silver medalist(s)	England	19
3rd place, bronze medalist(s)	New Zealand	17
4	Australia	15
5	Fiji	13
6	United States	12
7	Argentina	10
7	Wales	10

Place	Team	Points
9	Russia	8
10	France	7
11	Samoa	5
11	Japan	5
13	Canada	3
14	Kenya	2
15	Papua New Guinea	1
15	Scotland	1

Source: World Rugby (archived)

== See also ==
- 2017 Sydney Women's Sevens

World Sevens Series XVIII
Preceded by 2017 Wellington Sevens	2017 Sydney Sevens	Succeeded by 2017 USA Sevens
Australian Sevens
Preceded by 2016 Sydney Sevens	2017 Sydney Sevens	Succeeded by 2018 Sydney Sevens
