= Daniel La Prevotte =

US rugby union player

Danny La Prevotte
- Born: Daniel La Prevotte; June 4, 1985 (age 41)
- Height: 1.88 m (6 ft 2 in)
- Weight: 100 kg (220 lb)

Rugby union career
- Position: Flank
- Current team: San Francisco Golden Gate
Amateur team(s)
| Years | Team | Apps | (Points) |
- San Francisco Golden Gate
International career
| Years | Team | Apps | (Points) |
| 2010 | USA | 0 | |

Daniel La Prevotte (born June 4, 1984) is an American rugby union player. Danny plays flank for San Francisco Golden Gate RFC. He was selected to tour with the USA national rugby union team, the USA Eagles XV, for the Autumn 2010 tour of Europe. Danny is yet to earn a cap playing for the Eagles XV.

Rugby Union blank line ups

== See also ==
- Rugby
