= 2017 Hong Kong Sevens =

International rugby sevens tournament

- Sevens World Series XVIII
- Host nation: Hong Kong
- Date: 7–9 April 2017

Cup
- Champion: Fiji
- Runner-up: South Africa
- Third: Australia

Challenge
- Winner: Scotland

Tournament details
- Matches played: 45+25
- Most tries: (United States) Perry Baker (9)

The 2017 Hong Kong Sevens was the 42nd edition of the Hong Kong Sevens tournament, and the seventh tournament of the 2016–17 World Rugby Sevens Series. The tournament was played on 7–9 April 2017 at Hong Kong Stadium in Hong Kong.

England's Dan Norton scored his 245th career try during the tournament, breaking Kenya's Collins Injera's record of 244 career tries in the World Rugby Sevens Series.

== Format ==
As in the last tournament, there will be a main draw with the fifteen World Series core teams and one invited team, and a qualifying tournament featuring twelve teams, the winner of which will be given core status in the next series.

The teams were drawn into four pools of four teams each. Each team plays all the others in their pool once. 3, 2 or 1 points for a win, draw or loss. The top two teams from each pool advance to the Cup brackets. The bottom two teams go into the Challenge trophy brackets.

== Teams ==
The main tournament will consist of the fifteen core teams and one invited team

=== Main draw ===
- Argentina
- Australia
- Canada
- England
- Fiji
- France
- Japan
- Kenya
- New Zealand
- Russia
- Samoa
- Scotland
- South Africa
- United States
- Wales
- South Korea

=== World Series Qualifier ===
Teams will qualify for the World Series Qualifier tournament based on continental championships. The top two teams from each continent that are not already core teams will qualify.

Continental Sevens Championship	Dates	Venue(s)	Berths	Qualified
2016 Rugby Europe Sevens Grand Prix Series	4 June-17 July 2016	(Russia) Moscow, (England) Exeter, (Poland) Gdynia	2	Spain; Germany
2016 Asia Rugby Sevens Series	3 September- 16 October 2016	Hong Kong, (South Korea) Incheon, (Sri Lanka) Colombo	2	Hong Kong; Sri Lanka
2016 Africa Cup Sevens	24–25 September 2016	(Kenya) Nairobi	2	Namibia; Uganda
2016 Oceania Sevens Championship	11–12 November 2016	(Fiji) Suva	2	Papua New Guinea; Tonga
2016 RAN Sevens	12–13 November 2016	(Trinidad and Tobago) Port of Spain	2	Guyana; Jamaica
2017 Sudamérica Rugby Sevens	6–15 January 2017	(Uruguay) Punta Del Este, (Chile) Viña del Mar	2	Chile; Uruguay
Total			12	

== Main draw ==
=== Pool stage ===
Key to colours in group tables
Teams that advanced to the Cup Quarterfinal

==== Pool A ====
Pos	Team	Pld	W	D	L	PF	PA	PD	Pts
1	Australia	3	3	0	0	85	29	+56	9
2	England	3	2	0	1	74	22	+52	7
3	Samoa	3	1	0	2	51	45	+6	5
4	South Korea	3	0	0	3	12	126	−114	3

7 April 2017
18:00

Australia	21–19	Samoa

Hong Kong Stadium, Hong Kong

7 April 2017
18:22

England	52–0	South Korea

Hong Kong Stadium, Hong Kong

8 April 2017
11:18

Australia	52–0	South Korea

Hong Kong Stadium, Hong Kong

8 April 2017
11:40

England	12–10	Samoa

Hong Kong Stadium, Hong Kong

8 April 2017
15:18

Samoa	22–12	South Korea

Hong Kong Stadium, Hong Kong

8 April 2017
15:40

England	10–12	Australia

Hong Kong Stadium, Hong Kong

==== Pool B ====
Pos	Team	Pld	W	D	L	PF	PA	PD	Pts
1	South Africa	3	3	0	0	78	27	+51	9
2	Canada	3	2	0	1	52	54	−2	7
3	Kenya	3	1	0	2	53	64	−11	5
4	France	3	0	0	3	36	74	−38	3

7 April 2017
20:18

Canada	17–14	Kenya

Hong Kong Stadium, Hong Kong

7 April 2017
20:40

South Africa	17–10	France

Hong Kong Stadium, Hong Kong

8 April 2017
13:34

Canada	28–14	France

Hong Kong Stadium, Hong Kong

8 April 2017
13:56

South Africa	35–10	Kenya

Hong Kong Stadium, Hong Kong

8 April 2017
17:34

Kenya	29–12	France

Hong Kong Stadium, Hong Kong

8 April 2017
17:56

South Africa	26–7	Canada

Hong Kong Stadium, Hong Kong

==== Pool C ====
Pos	Team	Pld	W	D	L	PF	PA	PD	Pts
1	Fiji	3	2	1	0	70	31	+39	8
2	New Zealand	3	2	0	1	73	38	+35	7
3	Wales	3	1	1	1	58	57	+1	6
4	Japan	3	0	0	3	35	110	−75	3

7 April 2017
19:32

New Zealand	19–7	Wales

Hong Kong Stadium, Hong Kong

7 April 2017
19:54

Fiji	36–0	Japan

Hong Kong Stadium, Hong Kong

8 April 2017
12:50

New Zealand	40–14	Japan

Hong Kong Stadium, Hong Kong

8 April 2017
13:12

Fiji	17–17	Wales

Hong Kong Stadium, Hong Kong

8 April 2017
16:48

Wales	34–21	Japan

Hong Kong Stadium, Hong Kong

8 April 2017
17:12

Fiji	17–14	New Zealand

Hong Kong Stadium, Hong Kong

==== Pool D ====
Pos	Team	Pld	W	D	L	PF	PA	PD	Pts
1	United States	3	3	0	0	66	26	+40	9
2	Argentina	3	2	0	1	44	59	−15	7
3	Russia	3	1	0	2	33	36	−3	5
4	Scotland	3	0	0	3	33	55	−22	3

7 April 2017
18:44

Argentina	22–14	Scotland

Hong Kong Stadium, Hong Kong

7 April 2017
19:08

United States	14–7	Russia

Hong Kong Stadium, Hong Kong

8 April 2017
12:02

Argentina	17–12	Russia

Hong Kong Stadium, Hong Kong

8 April 2017
12:26

United States	19–14	Scotland

Hong Kong Stadium, Hong Kong

8 April 2017
16:02

Scotland	5–14	Russia

Hong Kong Stadium, Hong Kong

8 April 2017
16:24

United States	33–5	Argentina

Hong Kong Stadium, Hong Kong

=== Knockout stage ===
==== 13th Place ====
Semi-finals
9 April 2017 – 13:14 – Hong Kong Stadium
Samoa	12
Wales	26
9 April 2017 – 13:36 – Hong Kong Stadium
South Korea	7
Japan	36

13th Place Final
9 April 2017 – 17:00 – Hong Kong Stadium
Wales	21
Japan	28

==== Challenge Trophy ====
Quarter-finals

Semi-finals

Challenge Trophy Final

9 April 2017 – 09:30 – Hong Kong Stadium

Samoa
21

9 April 2017 – 13:58 – Hong Kong Stadium

Scotland
26

Scotland
21

9 April 2017 – 09:52 – Hong Kong Stadium

France
19

Wales
21

9 April 2017 – 17:30 – Hong Kong Stadium

France
28

Scotland
21

9 April 2017 – 10:14 – Hong Kong Stadium

Kenya
19

Russia
43

9 April 2017 – 14:22 – Hong Kong Stadium

South Korea
0

Russia
5

9 April 2017 – 10:36 – Hong Kong Stadium

Kenya
24

Kenya
24

Japan
17

==== 5th Place ====
Semi-finals
9 April 2017 – 14:47 – Hong Kong Stadium
Argentina	20
Canada	19
9 April 2017 – 15:09 – Hong Kong Stadium
England	7
New Zealand	21

5th Place Final
9 April 2017 – 18:00 – Hong Kong Stadium
Argentina	7
New Zealand	10

==== Cup ====
Quarter-finals
9 April 2017 – 10:58 – Hong Kong Stadium
Australia	21
Argentina	12
9 April 2017 – 11:20 – Hong Kong Stadium
Fiji	29
Canada	12
9 April 2017 – 11:42 – Hong Kong Stadium
United States	27
England	7
9 April 2017 – 12:06 – Hong Kong Stadium
South Africa	21
New Zealand	19

Semi-finals
9 April 2017 – 15:31 – Hong Kong Stadium
Australia	12
Fiji	33
9 April 2017 – 15:53 – Hong Kong Stadium
United States	24
South Africa	29

Cup Final
9 April 2017 – 19:00 – Hong Kong Stadium
Fiji	22
South Africa	0
Bronze Medal Match
9 April 2017 – 18:30 – Hong Kong Stadium
Australia	26
United States	19

=== Player scoring ===
Most tries:

1. Perry Baker (9)
2. Joe Ravouvou (6)
3. (Several players tied) (5)

== Tournament placings ==
Place	Team	Points
1st place, gold medalist(s)	Fiji	22
2nd place, silver medalist(s)	South Africa	19
3rd place, bronze medalist(s)	Australia	17
4	United States	15
5	New Zealand	13
6	Argentina	12
7	England	10
7	Canada	10

Place	Team	Points
9	Scotland	8
10	Kenya	7
11	France	5
11	Russia	5
13	Japan	3
14	Wales	2
15	Samoa	1
15	South Korea	1

Source: World Rugby (archived)

== World Series Qualifier ==
=== Pool stage ===
==== Pool E ====
Pos	Team	Pld	W	D	L	PF	PA	PD	Pts
1	Germany	3	3	0	0	79	33	+46	9
2	Uganda	3	2	0	1	55	29	+26	7
3	Tonga	3	1	0	2	35	58	−23	5
4	Jamaica	3	0	0	3	22	71	−49	3

7 April 2017
12:44

Uganda	29–0	Tonga

Hong Kong Stadium, Hong Kong

7 April 2017
13:06

Germany	31–12	Jamaica

Hong Kong Stadium, Hong Kong

7 April 2017
15:40

Tonga	14–5	Jamaica

Hong Kong Stadium, Hong Kong

7 April 2017
16:04

Germany	24–0	Uganda

Hong Kong Stadium, Hong Kong

8 April 2017
09:44

Uganda	26–5	Jamaica

Hong Kong Stadium, Hong Kong

8 April 2017
10:06

Germany	24–21	Tonga

Hong Kong Stadium, Hong Kong

==== Pool F ====
Pos	Team	Pld	W	D	L	PF	PA	PD	Pts
1	Chile	3	3	0	0	95	14	+81	9
2	Hong Kong	3	2	0	1	53	43	+10	7
3	Namibia	3	1	0	2	47	62	−15	5
4	Sri Lanka	3	0	0	3	19	95	−76	3

7 April 2017
13:28

Chile	38–0	Sri Lanka

Hong Kong Stadium, Hong Kong

7 April 2017
13:50

Hong Kong	22–7	Namibia

Hong Kong Stadium, Hong Kong

7 April 2017
16:28

Chile	26–14	Namibia

Hong Kong Stadium, Hong Kong

7 April 2017
16:50

Hong Kong	31–5	Sri Lanka

Hong Kong Stadium, Hong Kong

8 April 2017
10:28

Sri Lanka	14–26	Namibia

Hong Kong Stadium, Hong Kong

8 April 2017
10:50

Hong Kong	0–31	Chile

Hong Kong Stadium, Hong Kong

==== Pool G ====
Pos	Team	Pld	W	D	L	PF	PA	PD	Pts
1	Spain	3	3	0	0	98	5	+93	9
2	Papua New Guinea	3	2	0	1	57	41	+16	7
3	Uruguay	3	1	0	2	71	76	−5	5
4	Guyana	3	0	0	3	24	128	−104	3

7 April 2017
12:00

Papua New Guinea	26–21	Uruguay

Hong Kong Stadium, Hong Kong

7 April 2017
12:22

Spain	47–5	Guyana

Hong Kong Stadium, Hong Kong

7 April 2017
14:56

Papua New Guinea	31–5	Guyana

Hong Kong Stadium, Hong Kong

7 April 2017
15:34

Spain	36–0	Uruguay

Hong Kong Stadium, Hong Kong

8 April 2017
09:00

Uruguay	50–14	Guyana

Hong Kong Stadium, Hong Kong

8 April 2017
09:22

Spain	15–0	Papua New Guinea

Hong Kong Stadium, Hong Kong

=== Knockout stage ===
Quarter-finals
8 April 2017 – 18:20 – Hong Kong Stadium
Chile	21
Uruguay	12
8 April 2017 – 18:44 – Hong Kong Stadium
Germany	14
Hong Kong	7
8 April 2017 – 19:06 – Hong Kong Stadium
Uganda	10
Papua New Guinea	14
8 April 2017 – 19:28 – Hong Kong Stadium
Spain	33
Namibia	0

Semi-finals
9 April 2017 – 12:30 – Hong Kong Stadium
Chile	7
Germany	19
9 April 2017 – 12:52 – Hong Kong Stadium
Papua New Guinea	12
Spain	21

World Series Qualifier Final
9 April 2017 – 16:30 – Hong Kong Stadium
Germany	7
Spain	12

== See also ==
- 2016–17 World Rugby Sevens Series
- 2017 Hong Kong Women's Sevens

World Sevens Series XVIII
Preceded by 2017 Canada Sevens	2017 Hong Kong Sevens	Succeeded by 2017 Singapore Sevens
Hong Kong Sevens
Preceded by 2016 Hong Kong Sevens	2017 Hong Kong Sevens	Succeeded by 2018 Hong Kong Sevens
