= 2016 RAN Sevens =

- Hosts: Trinidad and Tobago
- Date: 12–13 November
- Nations: Barbados; Bermuda; British Virgin Islands; Canada; Cayman Islands; Curacao; Dominican Republic; Guyana; Jamaica; Martinique; Mexico; Saint Vincent and the Grenadines; Trinidad and Tobago; Turks and Caicos Islands

Final positions
- Champions: Canada
- Runners-up: Guyana
- Third: Jamaica

The 2016 RAN Sevens will be the 16th edition of the annual rugby sevens tournament organized by Rugby Americas North. It will be played in Trinidad and Tobago at Saint Mary's College in Port of Spain

The top two teams (excluding Canada) will qualify for the 2017 Hong Kong Sevens for a chance to qualify as a core team in the Sevens World Series.

== First round ==
All times are Atlantic Standard Time (UTC-4)

Key to colours in group tables
Teams that advance to the Knockout Round
Teams that advance to the Consolation Round

=== Pool A ===
Teams	Pld	W	D	L	PF	PA	+/−	Pts
Canada	2	2	0	0	111	0	+111	6
Bermuda	2	1	0	1	19	57	-38	4
British Virgin Islands	2	0	0	2	5	78	-73	2

12 November 2016
11:28

Bermuda	19-5	British Virgin Islands

12 November 2016
13:18

Canada	59-0	British Virgin Islands

12 November 2016
15:30

Canada	52-0	Bermuda

=== Pool B ===
Teams	Pld	W	D	L	PF	PA	+/−	Pts
Trinidad and Tobago	2	2	0	0	64	10	+54	6
Mexico	2	1	0	1	35	12	+23	4
Saint Vincent and the Grenadines	2	0	0	2	0	77	-77	2

12 November 2016
11:28

Trinidad and Tobago	52-0	Saint Vincent and the Grenadines

12 November 2016
13:18

Mexico	25-0	Saint Vincent and the Grenadines

12 November 2016
15:52

Mexico	10-12	Trinidad and Tobago

=== Pool C ===
Teams	Pld	W	D	L	PF	PA	+/−	Pts
Barbados	3	3	0	0	80	15	+65	9
Cayman Islands	3	2	0	1	81	24	+57	7
Dominican Republic	3	1	0	2	24	52	-28	5
Curaçao	3	0	0	3	0	94	-94	3

12 November 2016
10:00

Cayman Islands	38-0	Curaçao

12 November 2016
10:00

Barbados	19-5	Dominican Republic

12 November 2016
11:50

Cayman Islands	33-7	Dominican Republic

12 November 2016
11:50

Barbados	44-0	Curaçao

12 November 2016
13:40

Cayman Islands	10-17	Barbados

12 November 2016
13:40

Curaçao	0-12	Dominican Republic

=== Pool D ===
Teams	Pld	W	D	L	PF	PA	+/−	Pts
Jamaica	3	3	0	0	71	21	+50	9
Guyana	3	2	0	1	90	24	+66	7
Martinique	3	1	0	2	45	62	-17	5
Turks and Caicos Islands	3	0	0	3	7	106	-99	3

12 November 2016
10:22

Guyana	40-0	Turks and Caicos Islands

12 November 2016
10:22

Jamaica	19-7	Martinique

12 November 2016
12:12

Guyana	43-7	Martinique

12 November 2016
12:12

Jamaica	35-7	Turks and Caicos Islands

12 November 2016
14:02

Guyana	7-17	Jamaica

12 November 2016
14:02

Turks and Caicos Islands	0-31	Martinique

== Consolation Round ==
=== Pool 1 ===
Teams	Pld	W	D	L	PF	PA	+/−	Pts
Dominican Republic	2	2	0	0	17	10	+7	6
British Virgin Islands	2	1	0	1	27	24	+3	4
Turks and Caicos Islands	2	0	0	2	12	22	-10	2

13 November 2016
10:20

British Virgin Islands	17-12	Turks and Caicos Islands

13 November 2016
12:26

Dominican Republic	5-0	Turks and Caicos Islands

13 November 2016
14:30

British Virgin Islands	10-12	Dominican Republic

=== Pool 2 ===
Teams	Pld	W	D	L	PF	PA	+/−	Pts
Martinique	2	2	0	0	45	7	+38	6
Curaçao	2	1	0	1	21	22	-1	4
Saint Vincent and the Grenadines	2	0	0	2	5	42	-37	2

13 November 2016
10:42

Saint Vincent and the Grenadines	0-28	Martinique

13 November 2016
12:26

Curaçao	7-17	Martinique

13 November 2016
14:30

Saint Vincent and the Grenadines	5-14	Curaçao

=== Finals ===
Consolation Match

13 November
15:58

Turks and Caicos Islands	21-15	Saint Vincent and the Grenadines

Shield Final

13 November
16:20

British Virgin Islands	0-5	Curaçao

Bowl Final

13 November
16:42

Dominican Republic	17-0	Martinique

== Knockout round ==
=== Plate ===
Quarter-finals
13 November - 9:14
Canada	24
Mexico	0
13 November - 9:36
Jamaica	26
Cayman Islands	7
13 November - 9:36
Barbados	7
Guyana	22
13 November - 9:14
Trinidad and Tobago	17
Bermuda	7

Semi-finals
13 November - 11:42
Mexico	12
Cayman Islands	0
13 November - 12:04
Barbados	0
Bermuda	21

Final
13 November - 15:36
Mexico	19
Bermuda	0
Third place
13 November - 13:54
Cayman Islands	5
Barbados	26

=== Cup ===
Quarter-finals
13 November - 9:14
Canada	24
Mexico	0
13 November - 9:36
Jamaica	26
Cayman Islands	7
13 November - 9:36
Barbados	7
Guyana	22
13 November - 9:14
Trinidad and Tobago	17
Bermuda	7

Semi-finals
13 November - 13:10
Canada	40
Jamaica	0
13 November - 13:10
Guyana	5
Trinidad and Tobago	0

Final
13 November - 17:04
Canada	54
Guyana	5
Third place
13 November - 15:58
Jamaica	24
Trinidad and Tobago	19

== Final standings ==
Legend
Winner
Qualified for the 2017 Hong Kong Sevens.

Rank	Team
1st place, gold medalist(s)	Canada
2nd place, silver medalist(s)	Guyana
3rd place, bronze medalist(s)	Jamaica
4	Trinidad and Tobago
5	Mexico
6	Bermuda
7	Barbados
8	Cayman Islands
9	Dominican Republic
10	Martinique
11	Curaçao
12	British Virgin Islands
13	Turks and Caicos Islands
14	Saint Vincent and the Grenadines
