= Stephen Tomasin =

American rugby union player

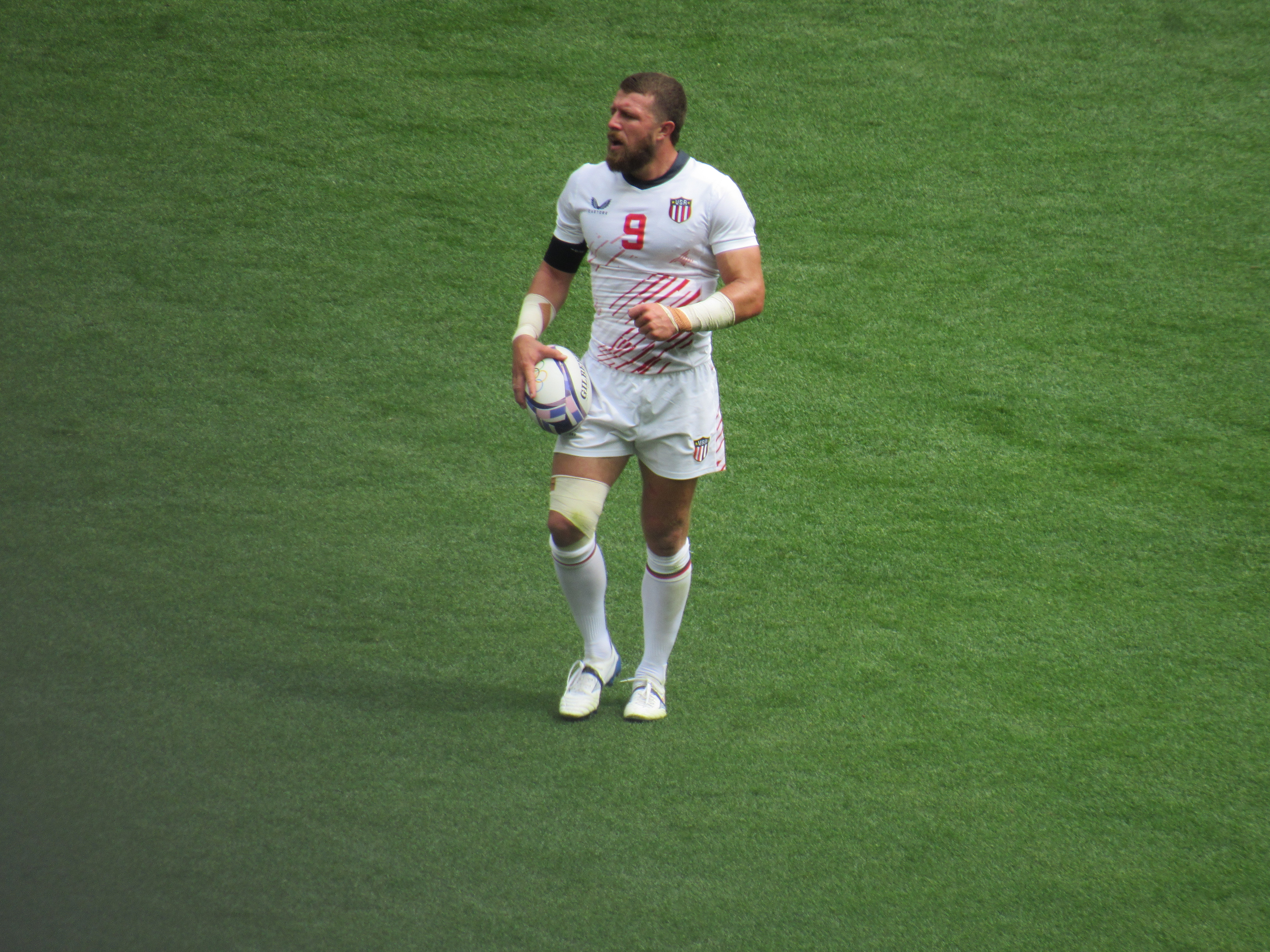
- Uruguay vs. USA, 2024 Summer Olympic rugby sevens, men's groups stage 8
- Born: September 25, 1994 (age 32) Santa Rosa, California, U.S.
- Height: 5 ft 11 in (180 cm)
- Weight: 200 lb (91 kg)
- University: San Diego State

Rugby union career
Amateur team(s)
Years	Team	Apps	(Points)
- San Diego State
- OMBAC
International career
Years	Team	Apps	(Points)
2013	U.S. U-23		
National sevens team
Years	Team		Comps
2013–	United States		29
- Correct as of June 6, 2019

Stephen Tomasin (born September 25, 1994) is an American rugby union player who plays for the United States national rugby sevens team in the World Rugby Sevens Series.

During his high school years, Tomasin played American football as a running back. In his senior year at Cardinal Newman High School, he was voted North Bay League Offensive MVP. He began playing rugby in high school in 2012. Tomasin played college rugby with the San Diego State Aztecs. In 2013, Tomasin was played with the USA Rugby Men's Collegiate All-Americans during his freshman year of college. Tomasin plays his club rugby with OMBAC in the Pacific Rugby Premiership.

== U.S. national sevens team ==
Tomasin debuted for the U.S. national rugby team as a teenager at the 2013 Gold Coast Sevens. He represented the U.S. national team at the 2015 Pan American Games. He suffered a setback in the fall of 2015, however, when he tore his ACL, and as a result he was out for several months. At 21 years old, Tomasin was the youngest of the 26 U.S. rugby players vying for a place on the U.S. 12-man roster for the 2016 Summer Olympics, but he missed out on national team selection.

Tomasin returned to the squad for the 2016-17 Sevens Series. He scored eight tries at the 2017 Singapore Sevens, and was one of three U.S. players to make the seven-man dream team. Tomasin returned for the 2017–18 Sevens Series, but was injured and missed several tournaments. Tomasin played some spells at halfback, instead of his usual forward position, due to injuries to scrum-half Madison Hughes and utility back Maka Unufe. Tomasin had an excellent 2018–19 Series; he played in every match en route to the U.S. best ever second-place finish, and finished as one of the three U.S. players selected for the Dream Team composed of the seven best players.

Tomasin was selected to represent the United States at the 2022 Rugby World Cup Sevens in Cape Town. He competed for the United States at the 2024 Summer Olympics in Paris.

=== Season by season ===
WR Sevens Series
WR 7s Season	Tackles made	USA Rank	World Rank
2016–17	156	1st	2nd
2017–18	67	5th	
2018–19	101	1st	5th
2019–20	47	1st	6th
2021–22	70	1st	13th
2022–23	80	2nd	24th
Totals	521	2nd	6th

== Honors ==
Individual

- World Rugby Men's Sevens Player of the Year nominee: 2019
