= 2017 London Sevens =

Rugby event

- Sevens World Series XVIII
- Host nation: England
- Date: 20–21 May 2017

Cup
- Champion: Scotland
- Runner-up: England
- Third: Canada

Challenge
- Winner: Fiji

Tournament details
- Matches played: 45

The 2017 London Sevens was the tenth and final event of the 2016–17 World Rugby Sevens Series and the seventeenth edition of the London Sevens. The tournament was held over the weekend of 20–21 May 2017 at Twickenham in London.

This was the first tournament in the history of the series with all semifinalists from the Northern Hemisphere, as Scotland, England, Canada, and the United States took out the top four placings. Scotland won the tournament, beating England 12–7 in the final. The USA's Perry Baker was the leading try scorer, notching eight tries over the weekend.

== Format ==
The teams were drawn into four pools of four teams each. Each team played all the others in their pool once. The top two teams from each pool advanced to the Cup quarter finals. The bottom two teams from each group advanced to the Challenge Trophy quarter finals.

== Teams ==
The sixteen participating teams for the tournament were:

- Argentina
- Australia
- Canada
- England
- Fiji
- France
- Japan
- Kenya
- New Zealand
- Russia
- Samoa
- Scotland
- Spain
- South Africa
- United States
- Wales

== Pool stages ==
=== Pool A ===
| Team | Pld | W | D | L | PF | PA | PD | Pts |
|---|---|---|---|---|---|---|---|---|
| United States | 3 | 2 | 0 | 1 | 83 | 40 | +43 | 7 |
| South Africa | 3 | 2 | 0 | 1 | 36 | 44 | -8 | 7 |
| Kenya | 3 | 1 | 0 | 2 | 38 | 76 | -38 | 5 |
| Wales | 3 | 1 | 0 | 2 | 55 | 52 | +3 | 5 |

20 May 2017
10:58

| United States | 12–28 | Wales |

Twickenham Stadium, London

20 May 2017
11:20

| South Africa | 12–10 | Kenya |

Twickenham Stadium, London

20 May 2017
14:04

| United States | 47–0 | Kenya |

Twickenham Stadium, London

20 May 2017
14:26

| South Africa | 12–10 | Wales |

Twickenham Stadium, London

20 May 2017
17:10

| Wales | 17–28 | Kenya |

Twickenham Stadium, London

20 May 2017
17:32

| South Africa | 12–24 | United States |

Twickenham Stadium, London

=== Pool B ===
| Team | Pld | W | D | L | PF | PA | PD | Pts |
|---|---|---|---|---|---|---|---|---|
| Argentina | 3 | 2 | 0 | 1 | 80 | 52 | +28 | 7 |
| Scotland | 3 | 2 | 0 | 1 | 59 | 42 | +16 | 7 |
| France | 3 | 2 | 0 | 1 | 49 | 67 | -17 | 7 |
| Russia | 3 | 0 | 0 | 3 | 46 | 73 | -27 | 3 |

20 May 2017
10:14

| France | 7–35 | Argentina |

Twickenham Stadium, London

20 May 2017
10:36

| Scotland | 21–7 | Russia |

Twickenham Stadium, London

20 May 2017
13:20

| France | 26–20 | Russia |

Twickenham Stadium, London

20 May 2017
13:42

| Scotland | 26–19 | Argentina |

Twickenham Stadium, London

20 May 2017
16:26

| Argentina | 26–19 | Russia |

Twickenham Stadium, London

20 May 2017
16:48

| Scotland | 12-16 | France |

Twickenham Stadium, London

=== Pool C ===
| Team | Pld | W | D | L | PF | PA | PD | Pts |
|---|---|---|---|---|---|---|---|---|
| New Zealand | 3 | 3 | 0 | 0 | 79 | 42 | +37 | 9 |
| Canada | 3 | 2 | 0 | 1 | 64 | 52 | +12 | 7 |
| Fiji | 3 | 1 | 0 | 2 | 101 | 54 | +47 | 5 |
| Japan | 3 | 0 | 0 | 3 | 26 | 122 | -96 | 3 |

20 May 2017
9:30

| Fiji | 19–22 | Canada |

Twickenham Stadium, London

20 May 2017
9:52

| New Zealand | 33–7 | Japan |

Twickenham Stadium, London

20 May 2017
12:36

| Fiji | 61–5 | Japan |

Twickenham Stadium, London

20 May 2017
12:58

| New Zealand | 19–14 | Canada |

Twickenham Stadium, London

20 May 2017
15:42

| Canada | 28–14 | Japan |

Twickenham Stadium, London

20 May 2017
16:04

| New Zealand | 27–21 | Fiji |

Twickenham Stadium, London

=== Pool D ===
| Team | Pld | W | D | L | PF | PA | PD | Pts |
|---|---|---|---|---|---|---|---|---|
| England | 3 | 3 | 0 | 0 | 71 | 38 | +33 | 9 |
| Australia | 3 | 2 | 0 | 1 | 96 | 24 | +72 | 7 |
| Samoa | 3 | 1 | 0 | 2 | 64 | 65 | -1 | 5 |
| Spain | 3 | 0 | 0 | 3 | 14 | 118 | -104 | 3 |

20 May 2017
11:42

| Samoa | 5–34 | Australia |

Twickenham Stadium, London

20 May 2017
12:04

| England | 28–7 | Spain |

Twickenham Stadium, London

20 May 2017
14:48

| Samoa | 40–7 | Spain |

Twickenham Stadium, London

20 May 2017
15:10

| England | 19–12 | Australia |

Twickenham Stadium, London

20 May 2017
17:54

| Australia | 50–0 | Spain |

Twickenham Stadium, London

20 May 2017
18:16

| England | 24–19 | Samoa |

Twickenham Stadium, London

== Knockout stage ==
=== 13th Place ===
Semi-finals
21 May 2017 – 12:36 – Twickenham Stadium
Spain | 5
Russia | 38
21 May 2017 – 12:58 – Twickenham Stadium
Samoa | 33
Japan | 7

13th Place Final
21 May 2017 – 16:07 – Twickenham Stadium
Russia | 19
Samoa | 24

=== Challenge Trophy ===
Quarter-finals
21 May 2017 – 9:30 – Twickenham Stadium
Kenya | 33
Spain | 7
21 May 2017 – 9:52 – Twickenham Stadium
Fiji | 31
Russia | 5
21 May 2017 – 10:14 – Twickenham Stadium
Samoa | 21
Wales | 29
21 May 2017 – 10:36 – Twickenham Stadium
France | 22
Japan | 5

Semi-finals
21 May 2017 – 13:20 – Twickenham Stadium
Kenya | 5
Fiji | 45
21 May 2017 – 13:42 – Twickenham Stadium
Wales | 26
France | 17

Challenge Thophy Final
21 May 2017 – 16:32 – Twickenham Stadium
Fiji | 26
Wales | 14

=== 5th place ===
Semi-finals
21 May 2017 – 14:04 – Twickenham Stadium
Australia | 40
New Zealand | 7
21 May 2017 – 14:26 – Twickenham Stadium
South Africa | 28
Argentina | 7

5th Place Final
21 May 2017 – 17:07 – Twickenham Stadium
Australia | 17
South Africa | 28

=== Cup ===
Quarter-finals
21 May 2017 – 10:58 – Twickenham Stadium
United States | 31
Australia | 14
21 May 2017 – 11:20 – Twickenham Stadium
New Zealand | 21
Scotland | 24
21 May 2017 – 11:42 – Twickenham Stadium
England | 17
South Africa | 12
21 May 2017 – 12:04 – Twickenham Stadium
Argentina | 7
Canada | 28

Semi-finals
21 May 2017 – 14:48 – Twickenham Stadium
United States | 14
Scotland | 21
21 May 2017 – 15:10 – Twickenham Stadium
England | 24
Canada | 5

Cup Final
21 May 2017 – 17:57 – Twickenham Stadium
Scotland | 12
England | 7
Bronze Medal Match
21 May 2017 – 17:32 – Twickenham Stadium
United States | 19
Canada | 22

== Tournament placings ==
| Place | Team | Points |
|---|---|---|
| 1st place, gold medalist(s) | Scotland | 22 |
| 2nd place, silver medalist(s) | England | 19 |
| 3rd place, bronze medalist(s) | Canada | 17 |
| 4 | United States | 15 |
| 5 | South Africa | 13 |
| 6 | Australia | 12 |
| 7 | New Zealand | 10 |
| 7 | Argentina | 10 |

| Place | Team | Points |
|---|---|---|
| 9 | Fiji | 8 |
| 10 | Wales | 7 |
| 11 | France | 5 |
| 11 | Kenya | 5 |
| 13 | Samoa | 3 |
| 14 | Russia | 2 |
| 15 | Spain | 1 |
| 15 | Japan | 1 |

Source: World Rugby (archived)

World Sevens Series XVIII
| Preceded by 2017 Paris Sevens | 2017 London Sevens | Succeeded by None (last event) |
London Sevens
| Preceded by 2016 London Sevens | 2017 London Sevens | Succeeded by 2018 London Sevens |
