= Life West Gladiators =

- Union: USA Rugby
- Founded: 2013; 12 years ago
- Location: Hayward, CA
- League(s): Pacific Rugby Premiership
Team kit

Official website
- www.lifewestrugby.com

The Life West Gladiators are an American rugby union club based in Hayward, California. They are the Men's team for Life Chiropractic College West. They compete in the Division I Pacific Rugby Premiership and are champions of the 2019 season. They moved up to Division I after winning the Division II National Championship in 2015.

== History ==
=== Life West Rugby ===
Dr. Brian Kelly (former President of Life Chiropractic College West) and his colleague Dr. Bruce Chester, established Life West Rugby in late 2013. Dr. Kelly grew up in New Zealand and wanted to establish a top-level rugby program which was realized on January 11, 2014, when the Gladiators, played their first ever league match.

Dr. Kelly wanted to develop a program from the beginning that showcased excellence in rugby and chiropractic. He also wanted to enhance college pride and introduce chiropractic to a wider community. The program provided opportunities for students, alumni, chiropractors and the local community to be involved with the team.
