= Ben Pinkelman =

American rugby union player (born 1994)

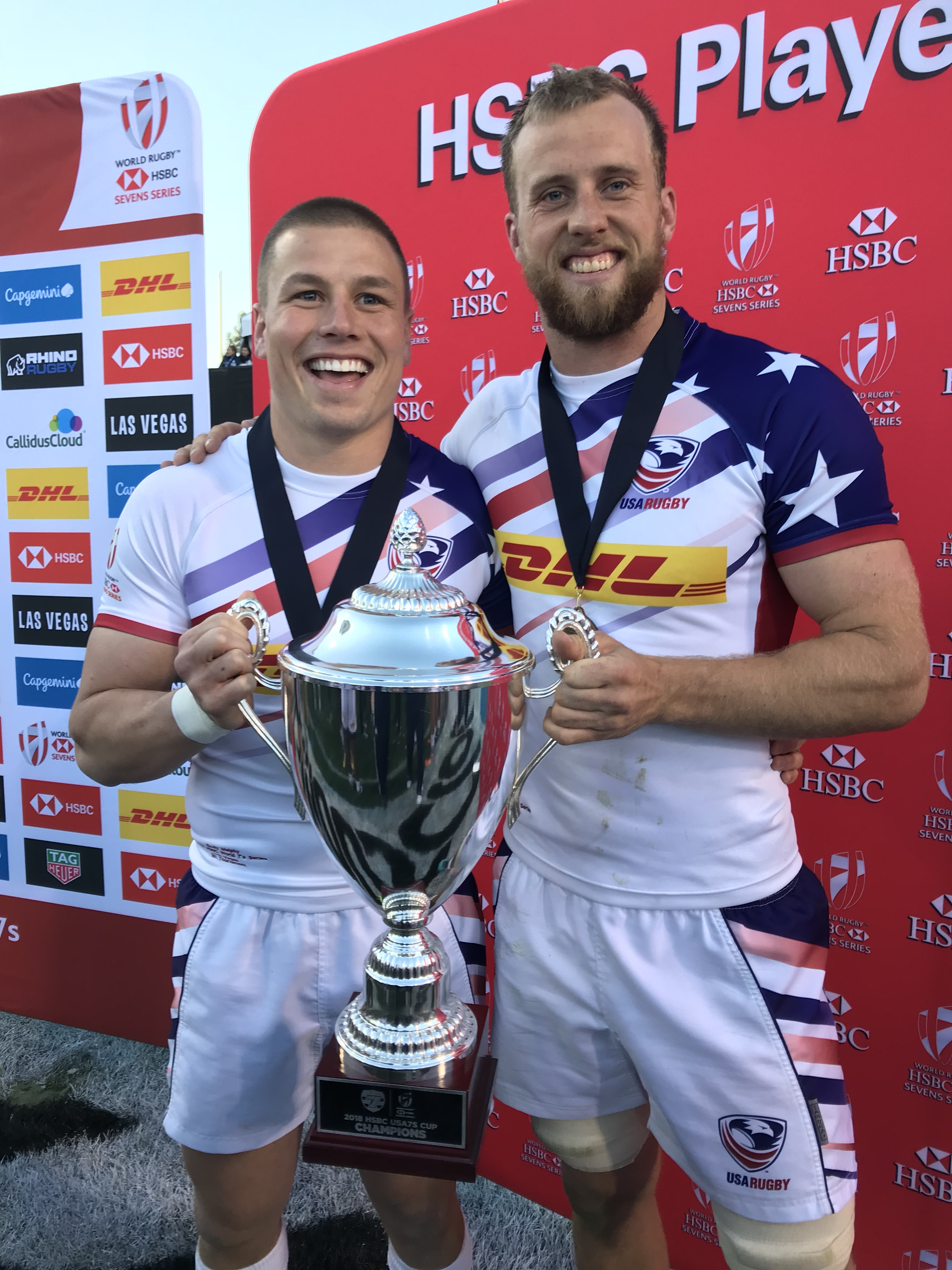
- Cody Melphy and Ben Pinkelman holding the cup after winning Las Vegas 7s
- Full name: Benjamin Joseph Pinkelman
- Born: June 13, 1994 (age 32) Omaha, Nebraska, United States
- Height: 6 ft 3 in (1.91 m)
- Weight: 207 lb (94 kg; 14 st 11 lb)
- School: Cherry Creek High School

Rugby union career
- Position: Flanker
International career
Years	Team	Apps	(Points)
2014	United States U20	4	(0)
2019–	United States	5	(0)
- Correct as of 1 December 2023
National sevens team
Years	Team		Comps
2016–	United States		39
- Correct as of 1 December 2023

Benjamin Joseph Pinkelman (born June 13, 1994) is an American professional rugby union player who plays as a forward for the United States national sevens team.

== Early life ==
Pinkelman began playing rugby while he attended Cherry Creek High School in Denver, Colorado. Pinkelman was named Youth Rugby Player of the Year by USA Rugby in 2014. He represented the United States at the 2014 IRB Junior World Rugby Trophy in Hong Kong. He attended Colorado State University, where he studied Criminal justice, and played for the Colorado State Rams and the Denver Barbarians RFC. He was named as Division 1-A Rugby Player of the Week twice while attending CSU.

== Club career ==
Pinkelman announced his return to the playing field for the 2023 Premier Rugby Sevens campaign, joining the newly formed Pittsburgh Steeltoes franchise in their first season. Pinkelman would be named captain of the men's Steeltoes team and would score his first try in his return against the New York Locals at the Eastern Conference Kickoff in Austin, Texas. He was named men's Player of the Tournament for the Eastern Conference Finals, leading the Steeltoes to a berth in the 2023 Championship weekend. He would miss the Championship due to injury sustained while training for the USA Sevens RAN Qualifier, with Lance Williams replacing him in the team that would ultimately finish runner up to the SoCal Loggerheads.

He was named Comeback Player of the Year for the 2023 season. He also was a finalist for the 2023 Season MVP.

== International career ==
=== United States Sevens ===
Pinkelman debuted for the United States sevens team at the 2016 Wellington 7's, and quickly cemented himself in the team with his tireless work rate and expert work at the breakdown. Pinkelman was the youngest player selected for the U.S. Olympic men’s rugby team at the 2016 Summer Olympics in Brazil, and started all five matches for the Eagles.

Pinkelman's strong performance at the 2017 Hong Kong Sevens, especially in defense and at the breakdown, earned him his first Dream Team honors (the seven best players at a World Series event are named to the Dream Team) . At only 23, Pinkelman captained the USA 7s side at the 2018 USA Sevens, in Las Vegas, where he led the U.S. to its first World Series tournament win on home soil. Ben also earned his second Dream Team honors from his performance in the USA's tournament win.

In 2019, Pinkelman secured the Dream Team honors in the Hamilton, New Zealand leg of the 2018/2019 World Series. Pinkelman earned Dream Team honors again in Las Vegas. The team he played in, Eagles, won their second consecutive tournament at home. Pinkelman was garnered a 2018/2019 Season Dream Team selection. Pinkelman's Sevens World Series stats are here and more about his 2018/2019 season is here.

Pinkelman sat out the first two tournaments of the 2018–20 Series as part of his recovery from the 2019 Rugby World Cup. He made an impact upon his return to the third and fourth legs of the Series in New Zealand and Australia, earning selection to the Dream Team for the 2020 Australia Sevens.

Following his return to play in Premier Rugby Sevens, Pinkelman returned to the US roster for the first time since his retirement for the Olympic qualifier for Rugby Americas North. He played a pivotal role in the final against Canada, helping the US men secure their third consecutive Olympic berth.

=== United States ===
Pinkelman's strong performance on the World Rugby Sevens Series led Gary Gold, the Head Coach of the USA Men's 15s Eagles, to request Pinkelman to join the U.S. national fifteens team as a loose forward in the team’s preparation for the 2019 Rugby World Cup in Japan. Pinkelman made his debut for the national fifteens team on August 2 in a win against Samoa at the 2019 World Rugby Pacific Nations Cup.

Pinkelman's performance in the Pacific Nations Cup earned him selection to the 2019 USA's Rugby World Cup side. He was selected for the World Cup squad despite the fact that he did not play the fifteens version of rugby union for three years prior to his selection to the team in the lead up to the World Cup. At the World Cup, he was not named to the match day squad for the opening match, but he did play in all three of the U.S. team’s remaining matches as a second half substitute.
