= Ray Sheeran Field =

Rugby facility on Treasure Island in San Francisco, California

Ray Sheeran-Wells Field
- Interactive map of Ray Sheeran-Wells Field
- Location: San Francisco, California
- Coordinates: 37.820892°N 122.366195°W
- Owner: City and County of San Francisco
- Surface: natural grass

Tenants
- San Francisco Golden Gate RFC; Olympic Club; San Francisco Fog RFC; Páirc na nGael; San Francisco Stars Netball Club; Life West Gladiatrix

Ray Sheeran-Wells Field is a rugby facility on Treasure Island in San Francisco, California that opened in 2005.

== History ==
The San Francisco Golden Gate RFC leased land and a former PX building from the city of for the purpose of building a field and clubhouse. The pitch was formerly named for former club president and current director Greg Rocca. In March 2011 the pitch was renamed to Ray Sheeran Field.

Ray Sheeran Field hosted the 2008, 2009, 2010, 2011, and 2012 Emirates Airline USA Rugby National Rugby Sevens Club Sevens Championships.

English Premiership rugby union side Harlequins also used the facility as a training ground during their San Francisco tour as part of their pre-season preparations ahead of the 2016-17 season
