= San Francisco Golden Gate RFC =

US rugby union club, based in San Francisco, CA

(United States) San Francisco
- Full name: San Francisco Golden Gate Rugby Football Club
- Union: USA Rugby
- Nickname: SFGG
- Founded: 2001; 25 years ago
- Ground: Ray Sheeran Field
- President: Paul Santinelli
- Coach: Neil Foote
- League: Pacific Rugby Premiership
Team kit

Official website
- sfggrugby.sportsengine-prelive.com

San Francisco Golden Gate Rugby Football Club is a rugby union club based in San Francisco, California. SFGG's first side competes in the Northern California Rugby Football Union's Men's Division I, Women's Division II, and Pacific Rugby Premiership. The SFGG Youth Program includes high school Varsity, Junior Varsity, Frosh-Soph teams as well as U-12, U-10 and U-8 (non-contact) youth teams. SFGG also fields nationally competitive Rugby Sevens squads over the summer. The SFGG Old Boys team, the Señors, feature in occasional matches.

== History ==
SFGG Rugby was formed in 2001 from the merger of the San Francisco Rugby Club and the Golden Gate Rugby Club. The club won the 2009 and 2011 Rugby Super League championships defeating Life University in the final both times, by 23–13 and 20–5 respectively.

== Ray Sheeran Field ==
San Francisco Golden Gate RFC leased land and a former PX building from the city of San Francisco on Treasure Island in the summer of 2005 for the purpose of building a field and clubhouse. The facility was opened in November 2005 with a grand banquet and dedication featuring former All Black captain Reuben Thorne and former US Eagle captain Dan Lyle. The pitch was formerly named for former club president and current director Greg Rocca. In March 2011, the pitch was renamed to Ray Sheeran Field.

Ray Sheeran Field hosted the 2008, 2009, 2010, 2011, and 2012 USA Rugby National Club Sevens Championships.

== Club honors ==
- Pacific Rugby Premiership
  - Champions: 2014
- USA Rugby Elite Cup
  - Champions: 2013
- Rugby Super League
  - Champions: 2009, 2011
  - Runner-up: 2004, 2010
  - Semifinalists: 2007
- US Men's Division I
  - Semifinalists: 1996, 2000, 2010
  - Finalists: 1999

== Notable players ==
=== Current players ===
Players with international caps in bold.

- (United States) Daniel La Prevotte
- (United States) Aaron Latzke
- (United States) Saimone Laulaupeaalu
- (United States) Shaun Paga
- (United States) **Danny Barrett** — flanker
- (United States) Patrick Latu — San Francisco Rush captain
- (United States) **Volney Rouse** — flyhalf
- (United States) Mile Pulu — center
- (United States) **Tai Enosa** — fullback

=== Former players ===
Internationally capped players are in bold.

- (United States) Brian Barnard
- (New Zealand) Nathan Couch
- (Australia) **Tony Daly**
- (United States) Philippe Farner
- (United States) Robbie Flynn
- (United States) **Oloseti Fifita**
- (United States) Fred Forster
- (United States) Jay Hansen
- (United States) Britt Howard
- (United States) **Seamus Kelly**
- (United States) **Mike MacDonald**
- (United States) **Samu Manoa**
- (United States) **Fifita Mounga**
- (United States) Jone Naqica
- (United States) **Folau Niua**
- (United States) **Thretton Palamo** — center
- (United States) **Shawn Pittman**
- (United States) **Naima Reddick**
- (United States) **Mark Scharrenberg**
- (United States) **Matt Sherman**
- (United States) **Paul Still**
- (United States) **Grant Wells**
- (United States) Jay Wilkerson

== Sponsorship ==
Notable primary sponsors include CallidusCloud and Canterbury of New Zealand. The club also has several secondary sponsorships from local and regional businesses.
