= 2016–17 World Rugby Sevens Series =

18th annual international series in men's rugby sevens

2016–17 World Rugby Sevens
- Series XVIII
- Hosts: United Arab Emirates; South Africa; New Zealand; Australia; United States; Canada; Hong Kong; Singapore; France; England
- Date: 2 Dec 2016 – 21 May 2017

Final positions
- Champions: South Africa
- Runners-up: England
- Third: Fiji

The 2016–17 World Rugby Sevens Series, known for sponsorship reasons as the HSBC World Rugby Sevens Series, was the 18th annual series of rugby sevens tournaments for national rugby sevens teams. The Sevens Series has been run by World Rugby since 1999–2000. South Africa won the Series with a comfortable 28-point margin over England; South Africa won five of the ten tournaments.

The 2016–17 Series also served as a qualifying tournament for the 2018 Rugby World Cup Sevens. Nine of the core teams had already qualified but the four highest-placed finishers from among the remaining six core teams also gained qualification for the 2018 RWC Sevens.

== Core teams ==
- Argentina
- Australia
- Canada
- England
- Fiji
- France
- Japan
- Kenya
- New Zealand
- Russia
- Samoa
- Scotland
- South Africa
- United States
- Wales

== Tour venues ==
The official schedule for the 2016–17 World Rugby Sevens Series was as follows:

2016–17 Venues
Leg	Stadium	City	Date	Winner
Dubai	The Sevens	Dubai	2–3 December 2016	South Africa
South Africa	Cape Town Stadium	Cape Town	10–11 December 2016	England
New Zealand	Wellington Regional Stadium	Wellington	28–29 January 2017	South Africa
Australia	Sydney Football Stadium	Sydney	4–5 February 2017	South Africa
United States	Sam Boyd Stadium	Las Vegas	3–5 March 2017	South Africa
Canada	BC Place	Vancouver	11–12 March 2017	England
Hong Kong	Hong Kong Stadium	Hong Kong	7–9 April 2017	Fiji
Singapore	National Stadium	Singapore	15–16 April 2017	Canada
France	Stade Jean-Bouin	Paris	13–14 May 2017	South Africa
England	Twickenham Stadium	London	20–21 May 2017	Scotland

There were no major changes to the schedule.

== Standings ==
The final standings after completion of the ten tournaments of the series are shown in the table below.

The points awarded to teams at each tournament, as well as the overall season totals, are shown. Gold indicates the event champions. Silver indicates the event runner-ups. Bronze indicates the event third place finishers. A dash (–) is recorded in the event column if a team did not compete at a tournament.

Final table:

2016–17 World Rugby Sevens – Series XVIII
Pos.	Event Team	Dubai	Cape Town	Wellington	Sydney	Las Vegas	Vancouver	Hong Kong	Singapore	Paris	London	Points total	Points difference
1	South Africa	22	19	22	22	22	19	19	12	22	13	192	831
2	England	17	22	10	19	13	22	10	17	15	19	164	452
3	Fiji	19	13	19	13	19	17	22	10	10	8	150	703
4	New Zealand	10	17	12	17	15	13	13	13	17	10	137	364
5	United States	8	10	5	12	17	15	15	19	13	15	129	335
6	Australia	13	5	7	15	12	10	17	15	7	12	113	188
7	Scotland	12	15	17	1	5	3	8	7	19	22	109	56
8	Canada	3	3	15	3	10	10	10	22	5	17	98	–11
9	Argentina	5	7	13	10	10	12	12	3	8	10	90	43
10	Wales	15	10	5	10	3	8	2	8	5	7	73	–60
11	France	10	8	10	7	5	1	5	5	10	5	66	–117
12	Kenya	5	12	8	2	8	5	7	10	1	5	63	–62
13	Samoa	7	1	3	5	7	7	1	5	12	3	51	–89
14	Russia	1	5	2	8	1	1	5	2	2	2	29	–610
15	Japan	1	1	1	5	2	2	3	1	3	1	20	878
16	Chile	–	–	–	–	1	5	–	–	–	–	6	–146
17	Uganda	2	2	–	–	–	–	–	–	–	–	4	–205
18	Papua New Guinea	–	–	1	1	–	–	–	–	–	–	2	–246
19	Spain	–	–	–	–	–	–	–	–	1	1	2	–258
20	Hong Kong	–	–	–	–	–	–	–	1	–	–	1	–104
21	South Korea	–	–	–	–	–	–	1	–	–	–	1	–186

Source: World Rugby. Archived

Legend
Event Medalists
Gold	Event Champions
Silver	Event Runner-ups
Bronze	Event Third place finishers
Qualification for the 2017–18 World Rugby Sevens Series
No colour	Core team in 2016–17 and re-qualified as a core team for the 2017–18 World Rugby Sevens Series
Pink	Relegated as the lowest placed core team at the end of the 2016–17 season
Yellow	Not a core team
Qualification for 2018 Rugby World Cup Sevens
Already confirmed for 2018 (host country United States and 2013 quarterfinalists)
Qualified as one of the four highest placed eligible teams from the 2016–17 World Rugby Sevens Series not already qualified.

== Players ==
=== Scoring leaders ===
Tries scored
Rank	Player	Tries
1	(United States) Perry Baker	57
2	(England) Dan Norton	51
3	(Canada) Justin Douglas	40
4	(South Africa) Seabelo Senatla	32
5	(Scotland) James Fleming	32

Points scored
Rank	Player	Points
1	(United States) Perry Baker	285
2	(Wales) Ethan Davies	281
3	(United States) Madison Hughes	279
4	(Canada) Nathan Hirayama	269
5	(Scotland) Scott Wight	266

Updated: 22 May 2017

=== Dream Team ===
Forwards	Backs
(South Africa) Chris Dry (Fiji) Kalione Nasoko (United States) Danny Barrett	(Fiji) Jerry Tuwai (South Africa) Rosko Specman (England) Dan Norton (United States) Perry Baker

== Placings summary ==
Tallies of top four tournament placings during the 2016–17 series, by team:

Cup
Team	(gold) Gold	(silver) Silver	(bronze) Bronze	Fourth	Total
South Africa	5	3	-	-	8
England	2	2	2	1	7
Fiji	1	3	1	-	5
Scotland	1	1	1	1	4
Canada	1	-	1	1	3
United States	-	1	1	3	5
New Zealand	-	-	3	1	4
Australia	-	-	1	2	3
Wales	-	-	-	1	1
Totals	10	10	10	10	40

== Tournaments ==
In this series, World Rugby abolished the minor trophies of Plate, Bowl and Shield that were previously awarded in the finals play-offs at each tournament. While the winner's Cup was retained as the major trophy, the awarding of gold, silver and bronze medals to players from the three top-placed teams was introduced for this series with the third-placed match now renamed as the bronze-medal match. A Challenge Trophy was established for teams competing in the lower bracket of the finals play-offs at each tournament. Additionally, the playing time for Cup final matches was reduced from 20 minutes to 14 minutes, in line with all other tournament matches.

=== Dubai ===
Event	Winners	Score	Finalists	Semi-finalists
Cup	South Africa	26–14	Fiji	England (Bronze); Wales
5th Place	Australia	19–12	Scotland	France; New Zealand
Challenge Trophy	United States	28–14	Samoa	Argentina; Kenya
13th Place	Canada	20–17	Uganda	Japan; Russia

=== Cape Town ===
Event	Winners	Score	Finalists	Semi-finalists
Cup	England	19–17	South Africa	New Zealand (Bronze); Scotland
5th Place	Fiji	33–21	Kenya	Wales; United States
Challenge Trophy	France	19–7	Argentina	Australia; Russia
13th Place	Canada	19–10	Uganda	Japan; Samoa

=== Wellington ===
Event	Winners	Score	Finalists	Semi-finalists
Cup	South Africa	26–5	Fiji	Scotland (Bronze); Canada
5th Place	Argentina	17–12	New Zealand	England; France
Challenge Trophy	Kenya	19–17	Australia	United States; Wales
13th Place	Samoa	19–12	Russia	Japan; Papua New Guinea

=== Sydney ===
Event	Winners	Score	Finalists	Semi-finalists
Cup	South Africa	29–14	England	New Zealand (Bronze); Australia
5th Place	Fiji	35–12	United States	Argentina; Wales
Challenge Trophy	Russia	26–0	France	Samoa; Japan
13th Place	Canada	10–5	Kenya	Papua New Guinea; Scotland

=== Las Vegas ===
Event	Winners	Score	Finalists	Semi-finalists
Cup	South Africa	19–12	Fiji	United States (Bronze); New Zealand
5th Place	England	10–7	Australia	Argentina; Canada
Challenge Trophy	Kenya	21–14	Samoa	France; Scotland
13th Place	Wales	21–19	Japan	Chile; Russia

=== Vancouver ===
Event	Winners	Score	Finalists	Semi-finalists
Cup	England	19–7	South Africa	Fiji (Bronze); United States
5th Place	New Zealand	17–14	Argentina	Canada; Australia
Challenge Trophy	Wales	19–12	Samoa	Kenya; Chile
13th Place	Scotland	24–19	Japan	France; Russia

=== Hong Kong ===
Event	Winners	Score	Finalists	Semi-finalists
Cup	Fiji	22–0	South Africa	Australia (Bronze); United States
5th Place	New Zealand	10–7	Argentina	Canada; England
Challenge Trophy	Scotland	21–19	Kenya	France; Russia
13th Place	Japan	28–21	Wales	South Korea; Samoa
World Series Qualifier	Spain	12–7	Germany	Chile; Papua New Guinea

=== Singapore ===
Event	Winners	Score	Finalists	Semi-finalists
Cup	Canada	26–19	United States	England (Bronze); Australia
5th Place	New Zealand	17–12	South Africa	Kenya; Fiji
Challenge Trophy	Wales	24–12	Scotland	Samoa; France
13th Place	Argentina	40–19	Russia	Japan; Hong Kong

=== Paris ===
Event	Winners	Score	Finalists	Semi-finalists
Cup	South Africa	15–5	Scotland	New Zealand (Bronze); England
5th Place	United States	24–19	Samoa	Fiji; France
Challenge Trophy	Argentina	33–12	Australia	Canada; Wales
13th Place	Japan	19–10	Russia	Spain; Kenya

=== London ===
Event	Winners	Score	Finalists	Semi-finalists
Cup	Scotland	12–7	England	Canada (Bronze); United States
5th Place	South Africa	28–17	Australia	Argentina; New Zealand
Challenge Trophy	Fiji	26–14	Wales	France; Kenya
13th Place	Samoa	24–19	Russia	Japan; Spain

== See also ==
- 2016–17 World Rugby Women's Sevens Series
