= 2017 Canada Sevens =

- Sevens World Series XVIII
- Host nation: Canada
- Date: 11–12 March 2017

Cup
- Champion: England
- Runner-up: South Africa
- Third: Fiji

Challenge
- Winner: Wales

Tournament details
- Matches played: 45
- Most points: (United States) Perry Baker (45)
- Most tries: (United States) Perry Baker (9)

The 2017 Canada Sevens was the second edition of the Canada Sevens tournament, and the sixth tournament of the 2016–17 World Rugby Sevens Series. The tournament was played on 11–12 March 2017 at BC Place in Vancouver, BC.

== Format ==
The teams were drawn into four pools of four teams each. Each team plays all the others in their pool once. 3, 2 or 1 points for a win, draw or loss. The top two teams from each pool advance to the Cup brackets. The bottom two teams go into the Challenge trophy brackets.

== Teams ==
The tournament will consist of the fifteen core teams plus Chile, who qualified by finishing as the best ranked non-core team of the 2017 Sudamérica Rugby Sevens.

- Argentina
- Australia
- Canada
- Chile
- England
- Fiji
- France
- Japan
- Kenya
- New Zealand
- Russia
- Samoa
- Scotland
- South Africa
- United States
- Wales

== Pool stage ==
=== Pool A ===
Team	Pld	W	D	L	PF	PA	PD	Pts
South Africa	3	2	1	0	60	17	+43	8
England	3	2	1	0	66	26	+40	8
Kenya	3	1	0	2	45	62	–17	5
Chile	3	0	0	3	19	85	–66	3

11 March
10:58

England	28 – 14	Kenya

BC Place, Vancouver

11 March
11:20

South Africa	33 – 0	Chile

BC Place, Vancouver

11 March
14:34

England	26 – 0	Chile

BC Place, Vancouver

11 March
14:56

South Africa	15 – 5	Kenya

BC Place, Vancouver

11 March
18:14

Kenya	26 – 19	Chile

BC Place, Vancouver

11 March
18:36

South Africa	12 – 12	England

BC Place, Vancouver

=== Pool B ===
Team	Pld	W	D	L	PF	PA	PD	Pts
Fiji	3	2	0	1	77	57	+20	7
Argentina	3	2	0	1	64	64	0	7
Wales	3	2	0	1	61	62	–1	7
Samoa	3	0	0	3	45	64	–19	3

11 March
10:14

Argentina	24 – 19	Samoa

BC Place, Vancouver

11 March
10:36

Fiji	34 – 19	Wales

BC Place, Vancouver

11 March
13:50

Argentina	14 – 21	Wales

BC Place, Vancouver

11 March
14:12

Fiji	19 – 12	Samoa

BC Place, Vancouver

11 March
17:30

Samoa	14 – 21	Wales

BC Place, Vancouver

11 March
17:52

Fiji	24 – 26	Argentina

BC Place, Vancouver

=== Pool C ===
Team	Pld	W	D	L	PF	PA	PD	Pts
United States	3	3	0	0	112	24	+88	9
Australia	3	2	0	1	53	43	+10	7
France	3	1	0	2	57	62	–5	5
Japan	3	0	0	3	26	119	–93	3

11 March
09:30

Australia	12 – 7	France

BC Place, Vancouver

11 March
09:52

United States	52 – 0	Japan

BC Place, Vancouver

11 March
13:06

Australia	36 – 7	Japan

BC Place, Vancouver

11 March
13:28

United States	31 – 19	France

BC Place, Vancouver

11 March
16:46

France	31 – 19	Japan

BC Place, Vancouver

11 March
17:08

United States	29 – 5	Australia

BC Place, Vancouver

=== Pool D ===
Team	Pld	W	D	L	PF	PA	PD	Pts
New Zealand	3	3	0	0	88	26	+62	9
Canada	3	2	0	1	68	35	+33	7
Russia	3	1	0	2	17	76	–59	5
Scotland	3	0	0	3	37	73	–36	3

11 March
11:42

Canada	28 – 15	Scotland

BC Place, Vancouver

11 March
12:04

New Zealand	40 – 0	Russia

BC Place, Vancouver

11 March
15:18

Canada	26 – 5	Russia

BC Place, Vancouver

11 March
15:40

New Zealand	33 – 12	Scotland

BC Place, Vancouver

11 March
18:58

Scotland	10 – 12	Russia

BC Place, Vancouver

11 March
19:20

New Zealand	15 – 14	Canada

BC Place, Vancouver

== Knockout stage ==
=== 13th Place ===
Semi-finals
12 March – 12:46 – BC Place, Vancouver
Scotland	28
France	21
12 March – 13:08 – BC Place, Vancouver
Russia	0
Japan	21

13th Place Final
12 March – 16:12 – BC Place, Vancouver
Scotland	24 (a.e.t.)
Japan	19

=== Challenge Trophy ===
Quarter-finals
12 March – 09:30 – BC Place, Vancouver
Kenya	19
Scotland	17
12 March – 09:52 – BC Place, Vancouver
France	21
Samoa	26 (a.e.t.)
12 March – 10:14 – BC Place, Vancouver
Russia	0
Chile	10
12 March – 10:36 – BC Place, Vancouver
Wales	33
Japan	0

Semi-finals
12 March – 13:30 – BC Place, Vancouver
Kenya	7
Samoa	26
12 March – 13:52 – BC Place, Vancouver
Chile	5
Wales	14

Challenge Trophy Final
12 March – 16:37 – BC Place, Vancouver
Samoa	12
Wales	19

=== 5th Place ===
Semi-finals
12 March – 14:24 – BC Place, Vancouver
Canada	5
Argentina	12
12 March – 14:46 – BC Place, Vancouver
New Zealand	21
Australia	0

5th Place Final
12 March – 17:07 – BC Place, Vancouver
Argentina	14
New Zealand	17

=== Cup ===
Quarter-finals
12 March – 11:08 – BC Place, Vancouver
South Africa	36
Canada	7
12 March – 11:30 – BC Place, Vancouver
United States	14
Argentina	12
12 March – 11:52 – BC Place, Vancouver
New Zealand	12
England	14
12 March – 12:14 – BC Place, Vancouver
Fiji	28
Australia	10

Semi-finals
12 March – 15:08 – BC Place, Vancouver
South Africa	14
United States	10
12 March – 15:30 – BC Place, Vancouver
England	40
Fiji	7

Cup Final
12 March – 18:19 – BC Place, Vancouver
South Africa	7
England	19
Bronze Medal Match
12 March – 17:52 – BC Place, Vancouver
United States	24
Fiji	28

== Tournament placings ==
Place	Team	Points
1st place, gold medalist(s)	England	22
2nd place, silver medalist(s)	South Africa	19
3rd place, bronze medalist(s)	Fiji	17
4	United States	15
5	New Zealand	13
6	Argentina	12
7	Canada	10
7	Australia	10

Place	Team	Points
9	Wales	8
10	Samoa	7
11	Kenya	5
11	Chile	5
13	Scotland	3
14	Japan	2
15	France	1
15	Russia	1

Source: World Rugby (archived)
