= 2016 Dubai Sevens =

World Rugby Sevens Series tournament

- Sevens World Series XVIII
- Host nation: United Arab Emirates
- Date: 2–3 December 2016

Cup
- Champion: South Africa
- Runner-up: Fiji
- Third: England

Challenge
- Winner: United States

Tournament details
- Matches played: 45

The 2016 Dubai Sevens was the first tournament within the 2016–17 World Rugby Sevens Series. It was held over the weekend of 2–3 December 2016 at The Sevens Stadium in Dubai, United Arab Emirates.

== Format ==
The teams were drawn into four pools of four teams each. Each team played the other three in its pool once. The top two teams from each pool advance to the Cup bracket where teams compete for the Gold, Silver, and bronze medals. The bottom two teams from each group go to the Challenge Trophy bracket.

== Teams ==
Fifteen core teams are participating in the tournament along with one invited team, the winner of the 2016 Africa Cup Sevens, Uganda:

- Argentina
- Australia
- Canada
- England
- Fiji
- France
- Japan
- Kenya
- New Zealand
- Samoa
- Scotland
- South Africa
- Russia
- United States
- Wales
- Uganda

== Pool stage ==
Key to colours in group tables
Teams that advanced to the Cup Quarterfinal

=== Pool A ===
Team	Pld	W	D	L	PF	PA	PD	Pts
Fiji	3	3	0	0	72	50	+22	9
Wales	3	2	0	1	64	48	+16	7
Argentina	3	1	0	2	59	57	+2	5
Canada	3	0	0	3	38	78	–40	3

2 December 2016
10:30

Argentina	19–21	Wales

The Sevens, Dubai

2 December 2016
10:52

Fiji	26–19	Canada

The Sevens, Dubai

2 December 2016
14:14

Argentina	21–14	Canada

The Sevens, Dubai

2 December 2016
14:36

Fiji	24–12	Wales

The Sevens, Dubai

2 December 2016
19:31

Wales	31–5	Canada

The Sevens, Dubai

2 December 2016
19:53

Fiji	22–19	Argentina

The Sevens, Dubai

=== Pool B ===
Team	Pld	W	D	L	PF	PA	PD	Pts
South Africa	3	3	0	0	86	22	+64	9
Scotland	3	2	0	1	54	40	+14	7
United States	3	1	0	2	51	40	+11	5
Uganda	3	0	0	3	21	110	–89	3

2 December 2016
09:44

United States	5–14	Scotland

The Sevens, Dubai

2 December 2016
10:06

South Africa	46–0	Uganda

The Sevens, Dubai

2 December 2016
12:44

United States	29–7	Uganda

The Sevens, Dubai

2 December 2016
13:06

South Africa	21–5	Scotland

The Sevens, Dubai

2 December 2016
18:44

Scotland	35–14	Uganda

The Sevens, Dubai

2 December 2016
19:06

South Africa	19–17	United States

The Sevens, Dubai

=== Pool C ===
Team	Pld	W	D	L	PF	PA	PD	Pts
England	3	3	0	0	83	26	+57	9
New Zealand	3	2	0	1	64	52	+12	7
Samoa	3	1	0	2	45	60	–15	5
Russia	3	0	0	3	27	81	–54	3

2 December 2016
11:14

England	19–7	Samoa

The Sevens, Dubai

2 December 2016
11:36

New Zealand	26–5	Russia

The Sevens, Dubai

2 December 2016
14:58

England	38–7	Russia

The Sevens, Dubai

2 December 2016
15:20

New Zealand	26–21	Samoa

The Sevens, Dubai

2 December 2016
20:15

Samoa	17–15	Russia

The Sevens, Dubai

2 December 2016
20:37

New Zealand	12–26	England

The Sevens, Dubai

=== Pool D ===
Team	Pld	W	D	L	PF	PA	PD	Pts
Australia	3	3	0	0	64	26	+38	9
France	3	2	0	1	59	42	+17	7
Kenya	3	1	0	2	43	48	–5	5
Japan	3	0	0	3	21	71	–50	3

2 December 2016
09:00

Kenya	14–24	France

The Sevens, Dubai

2 December 2016
09:22

Australia	19–14	Japan

The Sevens, Dubai

2 December 2016
12:00

Kenya	17–7	Japan

The Sevens, Dubai

2 December 2016
12:22

Australia	28–0	France

The Sevens, Dubai

2 December 2016
18:00

France	35–0	Japan

The Sevens, Dubai

2 December 2016
18:22

Australia	17–12	Kenya

The Sevens, Dubai

== Knockout stage ==
=== 13th place ===
Semi-finals
3 December 2016 – 13:38 – The Sevens, Dubai
Japan	19
Uganda	26
3 December 2016 – 14:00 – The Sevens, Dubai
Canada	27
Russia	5

13th Place Final
3 December 2016 – 17:57 – The Sevens, Dubai
Uganda	17
Canada	20

=== Challenge trophy ===
Quarter-finals
3 December 2016 – 09:30 – The Sevens, Dubai
Argentina	31
Japan	14
3 December 2016 – 09:52 – The Sevens, Dubai
Samoa	27
Uganda	19
3 December 2016 – 10:14 – The Sevens, Dubai
Kenya	22
Canada	14
3 December 2016 – 10:36 – The Sevens, Dubai
United States	40
Russia	0

Semi-finals
3 December 2016 – 14:22 – The Sevens, Dubai
Argentina	10
Samoa	12
3 December 2016 – 14:44 – The Sevens, Dubai
Kenya	19
United States	21

Challenge Trophy Final
3 December 2016 – 18:19 – The Sevens, Dubai
Samoa	14
United States	28

=== 5th place ===
Semi-finals
3 December 2016 – 15:27 – The Sevens, Dubai
France	17
Scotland	26
3 December 2016 – 16:19 – The Sevens, Dubai
Australia	20
New Zealand	12

5th Place Final
3 December 2016 – 18:44 – The Sevens, Dubai
Scotland	12
Australia	19

=== Cup ===
Quarter-finals
3 December 2016 – 11:00 – The Sevens, Dubai
Fiji	40
France	5
3 December 2016 – 11:22 – The Sevens, Dubai
England	24
Scotland	21
3 December 2016 – 11:44 – The Sevens, Dubai
Australia	12
Wales	21
3 December 2016 – 12:06 – The Sevens, Dubai
South Africa	40
New Zealand	0

Semi-finals
3 December 2016 – 16:41 – The Sevens, Dubai
Fiji	31
England	12
3 December 2016 – 17:03 – The Sevens, Dubai
Wales	5
South Africa	36

Cup Final
3 December 2016 – 19:33 – The Sevens, Dubai
Fiji	14
South Africa	26
Bronze Medal Match
3 December 2016 – 19:08 – The Sevens, Dubai
England	38
Wales	10

== Tournament placings ==
Place	Team	Points
1st place, gold medalist(s)	South Africa	22
2nd place, silver medalist(s)	Fiji	19
3rd place, bronze medalist(s)	England	17
4	Wales	15
5	Australia	13
6	Scotland	12
7	France	10
7	New Zealand	10

Place	Team	Points
9	United States	8
10	Samoa	7
11	Kenya	5
11	Argentina	5
13	Canada	3
14	Uganda	2
15	Japan	1
15	Russia	1

Source: World Rugby (archived)

World Sevens Series XVIII
Preceded by None (first event)	2016 Dubai Sevens	Succeeded by 2016 South Africa Sevens
Dubai Sevens
Preceded by 2015 Dubai Sevens	2016 Dubai Sevens	Succeeded by 2017 Dubai Sevens
