= 2017 Wellington Sevens =

- Sevens World Series XVIII
- Host nation: New Zealand
- Date: 28–29 January 2017

Cup
- Champion: South Africa
- Runner-up: Fiji
- Third: Scotland

Challenge
- Winner: Kenya

Tournament details
- Matches played: 45

The 2017 Wellington Sevens was the eighteenth edition of the Wellington Sevens tournament, and the third tournament of the 2016–17 World Rugby Sevens Series. The tournament was played on 28–29 January 2017 at Westpac Stadium in Wellington, New Zealand.

== Format ==
Sixteen teams are drawn into four pools of four teams each. Each team plays everyone in their pool once. The top two teams from each pool advance to the Cup quarterfinals. The bottom two teams from each group go to the Challenge Trophy quarterfinals.

== Teams ==
The fifteen core teams were joined by Papua New Guinea, who qualified via the 2016 Oceania Sevens, for this tournament.

- Argentina
- Australia
- Canada
- England
- Fiji
- France
- Japan
- Kenya
- New Zealand
- Samoa
- Scotland
- South Africa
- Russia
- United States
- Wales
- Papua New Guinea

== Pool Stage ==
Key to colours in group tables
Teams that advanced to the Cup Quarterfinal

=== Pool A ===
Team	Pld	W	D	L	PF	PA	PD	Pts
England	3	3	0	0	97	19	+78	9
Argentina	3	2	0	1	65	52	+13	7
Kenya	3	1	0	2	71	53	+18	5
Papua New Guinea	3	0	0	3	19	128	−109	3

28 January 2017
12:32

Kenya	12–17	Argentina
	Report

Westpac Stadium, Wellington

28 January 2017
12:55

England	40–0	Papua New Guinea

Westpac Stadium, Wellington

28 January 2017
15:56

Kenya	47–5	Papua New Guinea

Westpac Stadium, Wellington

28 January 2017
16:19

England	26–7	Argentina

Westpac Stadium, Wellington

28 January 2017
19:44

Argentina	41–14	Papua New Guinea

Westpac Stadium, Wellington

28 January 2017
20:10

England	31–12	Kenya

Westpac Stadium, Wellington

=== Pool B ===
Team	Pld	W	D	L	PF	PA	PD	Pts
South Africa	3	3	0	0	92	12	+80	9
Fiji	3	2	0	1	94	43	+51	7
Australia	3	1	0	2	45	66	−21	5
Japan	3	0	0	3	12	122	−110	3

28 January 2017
11:46

Fiji	26–12	Australia
	Report

Westpac Stadium, Wellington

28 January 2017
12:09

South Africa	33–0	Japan
	Report

Westpac Stadium, Wellington

28 January 2017
15:10

Fiji	56–0	Japan

Westpac Stadium, Wellington

28 January 2017
15:33

South Africa	28–0	Australia

Westpac Stadium, Wellington

28 January 2017
18:52

Australia	33–12	Japan

Westpac Stadium, Wellington

28 January 2017
19:18

South Africa	31–12	Fiji

Westpac Stadium, Wellington

=== Pool C ===
Team	Pld	W	D	L	PF	PA	PD	Pts
New Zealand	3	3	0	0	78	33	+45	9
France	3	1	1	1	63	47	+16	6
United States	3	1	1	1	57	57	0	6
Samoa	3	0	0	3	24	85	−61	3

28 January 2017
13:18

United States	21–21	France

Westpac Stadium, Wellington

28 January 2017
13:41

New Zealand	33–7	Samoa

Westpac Stadium, Wellington

28 January 2017
16:42

United States	24–12	Samoa

Westpac Stadium, Wellington

28 January 2017
17:05

New Zealand	21–14	France

Westpac Stadium, Wellington

28 January 2017
20:36

France	28–5	Samoa

Westpac Stadium, Wellington

28 January 2017
21:02

New Zealand	24–12	United States

Westpac Stadium, Wellington

=== Pool D ===
Team	Pld	W	D	L	PF	PA	PD	Pts
Canada	3	3	0	0	85	24	+61	9
Scotland	3	2	0	1	62	40	+22	7
Wales	3	1	0	2	45	59	−14	5
Russia	3	0	0	3	5	74	−69	3

28 January 2017
11:00

Wales	33–0	Russia
	Report

Westpac Stadium, Wellington

28 January 2017
11:23

Scotland	19–28	Canada
	Report

Westpac Stadium, Wellington

28 January 2017
14:24

Wales	5–28	Canada

Westpac Stadium, Wellington

28 January 2017
14:47

Scotland	12–5	Russia

Westpac Stadium, Wellington

28 January 2017
18:00

Russia	0–29	Canada

Westpac Stadium, Wellington

28 January 2017
18:26

Scotland	31–7	Wales

Westpac Stadium, Wellington

== Knockout stage ==
=== 13th place ===
Semi-finals
29 January 2017 – 14:16 – Westpac Stadium
Russia	15
Japan	5
29 January 2017 – 14:38 – Westpac Stadium
Papua New Guinea	7
Samoa	35

13th Place Final
29 January 2017 – 18:30 – Westpac Stadium
Russia	12
Samoa	19

=== Challenge Trophy ===
Quarter-finals
29 January 2017 – 11:00 – Westpac Stadium
Kenya	24
Russia	5
29 January 2017 – 11:22 – Westpac Stadium
United States	19
Japan	14
29 January 2017 – 11:44 – Westpac Stadium
Wales	29
Papua New Guinea	7
29 January 2017 – 12:06 – Westpac Stadium
Australia	17
Samoa	14

Semi-finals
29 January 2017 – 15:00 – Westpac Stadium
Kenya	19
United States	12
29 January 2017 – 15:22 – Westpac Stadium
Wales	10
Australia	24

Challenge Trophy Final
29 January 2017 – 19:00 – Westpac Stadium
Kenya	19
Australia	17

=== 5th Place ===
Semi-finals
29 January 2017 – 16:32 – Westpac Stadium
England	0
New Zealand	24
29 January 2017 – 16:54 – Westpac Stadium
Argentina	19
France	14

5th Place Final
29 January 2017 – 19:30 – Westpac Stadium
New Zealand	12
Argentina	17

=== Cup ===
Quarter-finals
29 January 2017 – 12:38 – Westpac Stadium
England	12
Scotland	14
29 January 2017 – 13:00 – Westpac Stadium
New Zealand	10
Fiji	26
29 January 2017 – 13:22 – Westpac Stadium
Canada	17
Argentina	12
29 January 2017 – 13:44 – Westpac Stadium
South Africa	45
France	0

Semi-finals
29 January 2017 – 17:16 – Westpac Stadium
Scotland	12
Fiji	19
29 January 2017 – 17:38 – Westpac Stadium
Canada	5
South Africa	21

Cup Final
29 January 2017 – 20:30 – Westpac Stadium
Fiji	5
South Africa	26
Bronze Medal Match
29 January 2017 – 20:00 – Westpac Stadium
Scotland	28
Canada	22

== Tournament placings ==
Place	Team	Points
1st place, gold medalist(s)	South Africa	22
2nd place, silver medalist(s)	Fiji	19
3rd place, bronze medalist(s)	Scotland	17
4	Canada	15
5	Argentina	13
6	New Zealand	12
7	France	10
7	England	10

Place	Team	Points
9	Kenya	8
10	Australia	7
11	United States	5
11	Wales	5
13	Samoa	3
14	Russia	2
15	Papua New Guinea	1
15	Japan	1

Source: World Rugby (archived)

World Sevens Series XVIII
Preceded by 2016 South Africa Sevens	2017 Wellington Sevens	Succeeded by 2017 Sydney Sevens
New Zealand Sevens
Preceded by 2016 Wellington Sevens	2017 Wellington Sevens	Succeeded by 2018 New Zealand Sevens
