= 2017 Paris Sevens =

- Sevens World Series XVIII
- Host nation: France
- Date: 13–14 May 2017

Cup
- Champion: South Africa
- Runner-up: Scotland
- Third: New Zealand

Challenge
- Winner: Argentina

Tournament details
- Matches played: 45

The 2017 Paris Sevens was the 15th edition of the France Sevens, and the ninth tournament of the 2016–17 World Rugby Sevens Series. The tournament was played on 13–14 May 2017 at Stade Jean-Bouin in Paris.

South Africa won the Cup final, defeating Scotland by 15–5 to clinch the overall series title for the season with an unassailable lead over the defending champions Fiji. New Zealand finished third in the Paris tournament, and Argentina won the Challenge trophy for ninth place.

== Format ==
The teams were drawn into four pools of four teams each. Each team played all the others in their pool once. The top two teams from each pool advanced to the Cup quarter finals. The bottom two teams from each group advanced to the Challenge Trophy quarter finals.

== Teams ==
The sixteen participating teams for the tournament were:

- Argentina
- Australia
- Canada
- England
- Fiji
- France
- Japan
- Kenya
- New Zealand
- Russia
- Samoa
- Scotland
- Spain
- South Africa
- United States
- Wales

== Pool stages ==
=== Pool A ===
Team	Pld	W	D	L	PF	PA	PD	Pts
Scotland	3	3	0	0	76	45	+31	9
South Africa	3	2	0	1	78	31	+47	7
Canada	3	1	0	2	47	64	–17	5
Japan	3	0	0	3	26	87	–61	3

13 May 2017
11:28

South Africa	12 – 19	Scotland

Stade Jean-Bouin, Paris

13 May 2017
11:50

Canada	21 – 7	Japan

Stade Jean-Bouin, Paris

13 May 2017
14:54

South Africa	35 – 5	Japan

Stade Jean-Bouin, Paris

13 May 2017
15:16

Canada	19 – 26	Scotland

Stade Jean-Bouin, Paris

13 May 2017
18:20

Scotland	31 – 14	Japan

Stade Jean-Bouin, Paris

13 May 2017
18:42

Canada	7 – 31	South Africa

Stade Jean-Bouin, Paris

=== Pool B ===
Team	Pld	W	D	L	PF	PA	PD	Pts
New Zealand	3	3	0	0	74	35	+39	9
United States	3	2	0	1	78	60	+18	7
Wales	3	1	0	2	68	92	–24	5
Argentina	3	0	0	3	61	94	–33	3

13 May 2017
10:44

New Zealand	26 – 7	Wales

Stade Jean-Bouin, Paris

13 May 2017
11:06

United States	26 – 19	Argentina

Stade Jean-Bouin, Paris

13 May 2017
14:10

New Zealand	21 – 14	Argentina

Stade Jean-Bouin, Paris

13 May 2017
14:32

United States	38 – 14	Wales

Stade Jean-Bouin, Paris

13 May 2017
17:36

Wales	47 – 28	Argentina

Stade Jean-Bouin, Paris

13 May 2017
17:58

United States	14 – 27	New Zealand

Stade Jean-Bouin, Paris

=== Pool C ===
Team	Pld	W	D	L	PF	PA	PD	Pts
England	3	2	1	0	67	19	+48	8
France	3	2	0	1	62	38	+24	7
Kenya	3	1	1	1	52	48	+4	6
Spain	3	0	0	3	14	90	-76	3

13 May 2017
12:12

Kenya	14 – 22	France

Stade Jean-Bouin, Paris

13 May 2017
12:34

England	31 – 0	Spain

Stade Jean-Bouin, Paris

13 May 2017
15:38

Kenya	26 – 14	Spain

Stade Jean-Bouin, Paris

13 May 2017
16:00

England	24 – 7	France

Stade Jean-Bouin, Paris

13 May 2017
19:04

France	33 – 0	Spain

Stade Jean-Bouin, Paris

13 May 2017
19:26

England	12 – 12	Kenya

Stade Jean-Bouin, Paris

=== Pool D ===
Team	Pld	W	D	L	PF	PA	PD	Pts
Samoa	3	2	1	0	59	50	+9	8
Fiji	3	2	0	1	102	33	+69	7
Australia	3	1	0	2	47	64	–17	5
Russia	3	0	1	2	31	92	–61	4

13 May 2017
10:00

Fiji	17 – 19	Samoa

Stade Jean-Bouin, Paris

13 May 2017
10:22

Australia	19 – 12	Russia

Stade Jean-Bouin, Paris

13 May 2017
13:26

Fiji	54 – 0	Russia

Stade Jean-Bouin, Paris

13 May 2017
13:48

Australia	14 – 21	Samoa

Stade Jean-Bouin, Paris

13 May 2017
16:52

Samoa	19 – 19	Russia

Stade Jean-Bouin, Paris

13 May 2017
17:14

Australia	14 – 31	Fiji

Stade Jean-Bouin, Paris

== Knockout stage ==
=== 13th place ===
Semi-finals
14 May 2017 – 12:06 – Stade Jean-Bouin
Russia	15
Kenya	7
14 May 2017 – 12:28 – Stade Jean-Bouin
Japan	26
Spain	19

13th Place Final
14 May – 15:37 – Stade Jean-Bouin
Russia	5
Japan	12

=== Challenge Trophy ===
Quarter-finals
14 May 2017 – 9:00 – Stade Jean-Bouin
Canada	33
Russia	0
14 May 2017 – 9:22 – Stade Jean-Bouin
Kenya	7
Argentina	12
14 May 2017 – 9:44 – Stade Jean-Bouin
Australia	28
Japan	19
14 May 2017 – 10:06 – Stade Jean-Bouin
Wales	26
Spain	14

Semi-finals
14 May 2017 – 12:50 – Stade Jean-Bouin
Canada	14
Argentina	15
14 May 2017 – 13:12 – Stade Jean-Bouin
Australia	14
Wales	12

Challenge Trophy Final
14 May 2017 – 15:59 – Stade Jean-Bouin
Argentina	33
Australia	12

=== 5th place ===
Semi-finals
14 May 2017 – 13:34 – Stade Jean-Bouin
Fiji	14
United States	24
14 May 2017 – 13:56 – Stade Jean-Bouin
Samoa	21
France	19

5th Place Final
14 May 2017 – 16:21 – Stade Jean-Bouin
United States	24
Samoa	19

=== Cup ===
Quarter-finals
14 May 2017 – 10:28 – Stade Jean-Bouin
Scotland	24
Fiji	0
14 May 2017 – 10:50 – Stade Jean-Bouin
England	26
United States	12
14 May 2017 – 11:12 – Stade Jean-Bouin
Samoa	0
South Africa	12
14 May 2017 – 11:34 – Stade Jean-Bouin
New Zealand	14
France	0

Cup Final
14 May 2017 – 14:18 – Stade Jean-Bouin
Scotland	19
England	17
14 May 2017 – 14:40 – Stade Jean-Bouin
South Africa	26
New Zealand	5

Final
14 May 2017 – 17:33 – Stade Jean-Bouin
Scotland	5
South Africa	15
Bronze Medal Match
14 May 2017 – 17:08 – Stade Jean-Bouin
England	5
New Zealand	12

== Tournament placings ==
Place	Team	Points
1st place, gold medalist(s)	South Africa	22
2nd place, silver medalist(s)	Scotland	19
3rd place, bronze medalist(s)	New Zealand	17
4	England	15
5	United States	13
6	Samoa	12
7	Fiji	10
7	France	10

Place	Team	Points
9	Argentina	8
10	Australia	7
11	Canada	5
11	Wales	5
13	Japan	3
14	Russia	2
15	Spain	1
15	Kenya	1

Source: World Rugby (archived)

World Sevens Series XVIII
Preceded by 2017 Singapore Sevens	2017 Paris Sevens	Succeeded by 2017 London Sevens
France Sevens
Preceded by 2016 Paris Sevens	2017 Paris Sevens	Succeeded by 2018 Paris Sevens
