= Danny Barrett (rugby union) =

American rugby union player

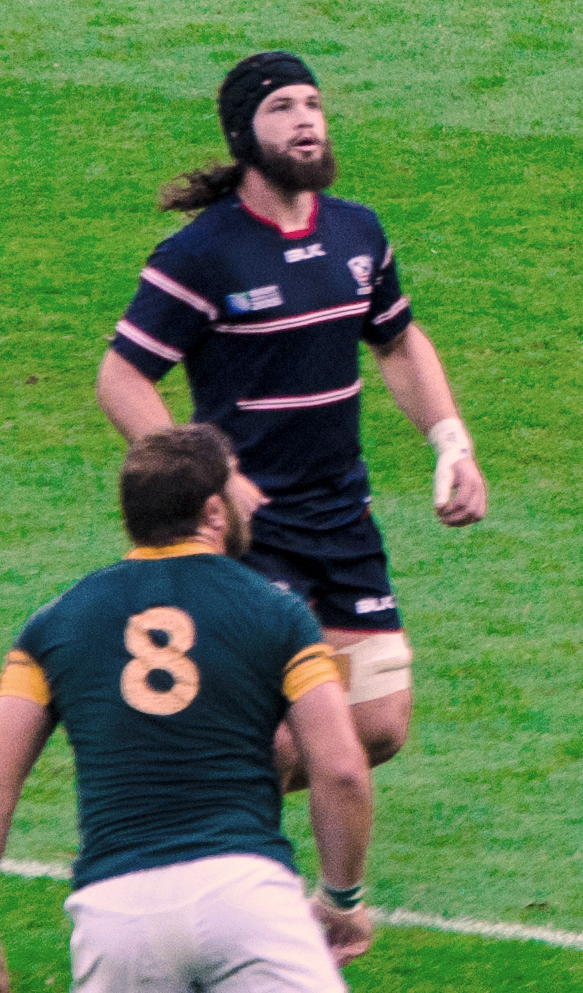
- Barrett in 2015
- Full name: Daniel Barrett
- Born: March 23, 1990 (age 36) Pacifica, California, U.S.
- Height: 6 ft 3 in (191 cm)
- Weight: 220 lb (100 kg)

Rugby union career
- Position: Flanker
Senior career
Years	Team	Apps	(Points)
2022–2023	Houston SaberCats	28	(25)
International career
Years	Team	Apps	(Points)
2014–2015	United States	13	(0)
- Correct as of 11 October 2015
National sevens team
Years	Team		Comps
2014–2021	United States		56
- Correct as of 25 December 2022

Danny Barrett (born March 23, 1990) is an American rugby player who played as a forward. He played for the U.S. national rugby team, and also played for the U.S. national rugby sevens team. Barrett was in the Men's Eagles Sevens pool for the World Rugby Sevens Series until late 2021. Barrett's strong play during the 2016–17 season landed him one of the seven spots on the 2017 season Dream Team, alongside teammate Perry Baker. In December 2021, Barrett signed to play for the Houston SaberCats of Major League Rugby (MLR).

Barrett played for the USA Selects during the 2013 IRB Americas Rugby Championship. Barrett debuted for the Eagles on June 7, 2014 when he came on as a sub in a match against Scotland. Barrett then started two matches during the 2014 Pacific Nations Cup.

== College and club rugby ==
Barrett played college rugby at the University of California, Berkeley. He played with the men's Collegiate All-Americans during their June 2013 tour of New Zealand.

Barrett was a member of the San Francisco Golden Gate sevens team at the inaugural 2013 World Club 7s in London. Barrett also spent time on a one-month trial with Gloucester of the English Premiership during fall 2014.
