= 2017 USA Sevens =

- Sevens World Series XVIII
- Host nation: United States
- Date: 3–5 March 2017

Cup
- Champion: South Africa
- Runner-up: Fiji
- Third: United States

Challenge
- Winner: Kenya

Tournament details
- Matches played: 45

The 2017 USA Sevens (also sometimes referred to as the 2017 Las Vegas Sevens) was the fourteenth edition of the USA Sevens tournament, and the fifth tournament of the 2016–17 World Rugby Sevens Series. The tournament was played on 3–5 March 2017 at Sam Boyd Stadium in Las Vegas, Nevada.

== Format ==
The teams were drawn into four pools of four teams each. Each team plays all the others in their pool once. 3, 2 or 1 points for a win, draw or loss. The top two teams from each pool advance to the Cup brackets. The bottom two teams go into the Challenge trophy brackets.

== Teams ==
The main tournament will consist of the fifteen core teams plus Chile, who qualified by finishing as the best ranked non-core team of the 2017 Sudamérica Rugby Sevens

- Argentina
- Australia
- Canada
- England
- Fiji
- France
- Japan
- Kenya
- New Zealand
- Samoa
- Scotland
- South Africa
- Russia
- United States
- Wales
- Chile

== Pool Stage ==
Key to colours in group tables
Teams that advanced to the Cup Quarterfinal

=== Pool A ===
Team	Pld	W	D	L	PF	PA	PD	Pts
South Africa	3	3	0	0	78	14	+64	9
Canada	3	2	0	1	52	47	+5	7
France	3	1	0	2	33	59	−26	5
Wales	3	0	0	3	35	78	−43	3

3 March 2017

Wales	7–33	France

Sam Boyd Stadium, Las Vegas

3 March 2017

South Africa	26–7	Canada

Sam Boyd Stadium, Las Vegas

3 March 2017

Wales	21–24	Canada

Sam Boyd Stadium, Las Vegas

3 March 2017

South Africa	31–0	France

Sam Boyd Stadium, Las Vegas

4 March 2017

France	0–21	Canada

Sam Boyd Stadium, Las Vegas

4 March 2017

South Africa	21–7	Wales

Sam Boyd Stadium, Las Vegas

=== Pool B ===
Team	Pld	W	D	L	PF	PA	PD	Pts
England	3	3	0	0	67	29	+38	9
United States	3	2	0	1	74	29	+45	7
Samoa	3	1	0	2	29	50	−21	5
Chile	3	0	0	3	17	79	−62	3

3 March 2017

United States	26–5	Samoa

Sam Boyd Stadium, Las Vegas

3 March 2017

England	31–5	Chile

Sam Boyd Stadium, Las Vegas

3 March 2017

United States	31–0	Chile

Sam Boyd Stadium, Las Vegas

3 March 2017

England	12–7	Samoa

Sam Boyd Stadium, Las Vegas

4 March 2017

Samoa	17–12	Chile

Sam Boyd Stadium, Las Vegas

4 March 2017

England	24–17	United States

Sam Boyd Stadium, Las Vegas

=== Pool C ===
Team	Pld	W	D	L	PF	PA	PD	Pts
Argentina	3	2	1	0	69	24	+45	8
New Zealand	3	2	0	1	53	24	+29	7
Kenya	3	1	1	1	33	48	−15	6
Russia	3	0	0	3	15	74	−59	3

3 March 2017

Argentina	43–0	Russia

Sam Boyd Stadium, Las Vegas

3 March 2017

New Zealand	24–7	Kenya

Sam Boyd Stadium, Las Vegas

3 March 2017

Argentina	14–14	Kenya

Sam Boyd Stadium, Las Vegas

3 March 2017

New Zealand	19–5	Russia

Sam Boyd Stadium, Las Vegas

4 March 2017

Russia	10–12	Kenya

Sam Boyd Stadium, Las Vegas

4 March 2017

New Zealand	10–12	Argentina

Sam Boyd Stadium, Las Vegas

=== Pool D ===
Team	Pld	W	D	L	PF	PA	PD	Pts
Fiji	3	3	0	0	89	29	+60	9
Australia	3	2	0	1	64	57	+7	7
Scotland	3	1	0	2	66	59	+7	5
Japan	3	0	0	3	19	93	−74	3

3 March 2017

Fiji	41–0	Japan

Sam Boyd Stadium, Las Vegas

3 March 2017

Australia	28–21	Scotland

Sam Boyd Stadium, Las Vegas

3 March 2017

Fiji	24–12	Scotland

Sam Boyd Stadium, Las Vegas

3 March 2017

Australia	19–12	Japan

Sam Boyd Stadium, Las Vegas

4 March 2017

Japan	7–33	Scotland

Sam Boyd Stadium, Las Vegas

4 March 2017

Australia	17–24	Fiji

Sam Boyd Stadium, Las Vegas

== Knockout stage ==
=== 13th Place ===
Semi-finals
5 March 2017 – 11:24 – Sam Boyd Stadium
Japan	24
Chile	7
5 March 2017 – 11:46 – Sam Boyd Stadium
Wales	24
Russia	5

13th Place Final
5 March 2017 – 14:28 – Sam Boyd Stadium
Japan	19
Wales	21

=== Challenge Trophy ===
Quarter-finals
4 March 2017 – 18:48 – Sam Boyd Stadium
France	24
Japan	14
4 March 2017 – 19:10 – Sam Boyd Stadium
Kenya	21
Chile	19
4 March 2017 – 19:32 – Sam Boyd Stadium
Scotland	28
Wales	21
4 March 2017 – 19:54 – Sam Boyd Stadium
Samoa	31
Russia	7

Semi-finals
5 March 2017 – 12:08 – Sam Boyd Stadium
France	7
Kenya	14
5 March 2017 – 12:38 – Sam Boyd Stadium
Scotland	0
Samoa	24

Challenge Trophy Final
5 March 2017 – 15:40 – Sam Boyd Stadium
Kenya	21
Samoa	14

=== 5th Place ===
Semi-finals
5 March 2017 – 13:00 – Sam Boyd Stadium
Australia	14
Argentina	0
5 March 2017 – 13:22 – Sam Boyd Stadium
Canada	5
England	12

5th Place Final
5 March 2017 – 16:05 – Sam Boyd Stadium
Australia	7
England	10

=== Cup ===
Quarter-finals
4 March 2017 – 20:16 – Sam Boyd Stadium
South Africa	17
Australia	14
4 March 2017 – 20:38 – Sam Boyd Stadium
Argentina	19
United States	21
4 March 2017 – 21:00 – Sam Boyd Stadium
Fiji	31
Canada	12
4 March 2017 – 21:22 – Sam Boyd Stadium
England	0
New Zealand	19

Semi-finals
5 March 2017 – 13:44 – Sam Boyd Stadium
South Africa	20
United States	17
5 March 2017 – 14:06 – Sam Boyd Stadium
Fiji	19
New Zealand	14

Cup Final
5 March 2017 – 17:00 – Sam Boyd Stadium
South Africa	19
Fiji	12
Bronze Medal Match
5 March 2017 – 16:30 – Sam Boyd Stadium
United States	19
New Zealand	15

== Tournament placings ==
Place	Team	Points
1st place, gold medalist(s)	South Africa	22
2nd place, silver medalist(s)	Fiji	19
3rd place, bronze medalist(s)	United States	17
4	New Zealand	15
5	England	13
6	Australia	12
7	Canada	10
7	Argentina	10

Place	Team	Points
9	Kenya	8
10	Samoa	7
11	France	5
11	Scotland	5
13	Wales	3
14	Japan	2
15	Chile	1
15	Russia	1

Source: World Rugby (archived)

== See also ==
- 2017 USA Women's Sevens
