= 2016 South Africa Sevens =

- Sevens World Series XVIII
- Host nation: South Africa
- Date: 10–11 December 2016

Cup
- Champion: England
- Runner-up: South Africa
- Third: New Zealand

Challenge
- Winner: France

Tournament details
- Matches played: 24
- Tries scored: 151 (average 6.29 per match)

The 2016 South Africa Sevens was the second tournament within the 2016–17 World Rugby Sevens Series and the eighteenth edition of the South Africa Sevens. It was held over the weekend of 10–11 December 2016 at Cape Town Stadium in Cape Town, South Africa.

== Format ==
The teams were drawn into four pools of four teams each, with each team playing every other team in their pool once. The top two teams from each pool advanced to the Cup/5th place brackets. The bottom two teams from each group went to the Challenge trophy/13th place brackets.

== Teams ==
Fifteen core teams participated in the tournament along with one invited team, which was the winner of the 2016 Africa Cup Sevens, Uganda:

- Argentina
- Australia
- Canada
- England
- Fiji
- France
- Japan
- Kenya
- New Zealand
- Samoa
- Scotland
- South Africa
- Russia
- Uganda
- United States
- Wales

== Pool Stage ==
Key to colours in group tables
Teams that advanced to the Cup Quarterfinal

=== Pool A ===
Team	Pld	W	D	L	PF	PA	PD	Pts
South Africa	3	3	0	0	98	17	+81	9
United States	3	2	0	1	55	45	+10	7
Australia	3	1	0	2	43	48	–5	5
Russia	3	0	0	3	17	103	–86	3

10 December 2016
12:27

Australia	0 – 19	United States

Cape Town Stadium, Cape Town

10 December 2016
12:49

South Africa	41 – 0	Russia

Cape Town Stadium, Cape Town

10 December 2016
15:48

Australia	36 – 0	Russia

Cape Town Stadium, Cape Town

10 December 2016
16:10

South Africa	28 – 10	United States

Cape Town Stadium, Cape Town

10 December 2016
19:34

United States	26 – 17	Russia

Cape Town Stadium, Cape Town

10 December 2016
19:56

South Africa	29 – 7	Australia

Cape Town Stadium, Cape Town

=== Pool B ===
Team	Pld	W	D	L	PF	PA	PD	Pts
Fiji	3	3	0	0	89	48	+41	9
Kenya	3	2	0	1	79	47	+32	7
France	3	1	0	2	83	68	+15	5
Japan	3	0	0	3	19	107	–88	3

10 December 2016
11:43

France	14 – 33	Kenya

Cape Town Stadium, Cape Town

10 December 2016
12:05

Fiji	33 – 7	Japan

Cape Town Stadium, Cape Town

10 December 2016
15:04

France	50 – 7	Japan

Cape Town Stadium, Cape Town

10 December 2016
15:26

Fiji	28 – 22	Kenya

Cape Town Stadium, Cape Town

10 December 2016
18:50

Kenya	24 – 5	Japan

Cape Town Stadium, Cape Town

10 December 2016
19:12

Fiji	28 – 19	France

Cape Town Stadium, Cape Town

=== Pool C ===
Team	Pld	W	D	L	PF	PA	PD	Pts
New Zealand	3	2	1	0	78	38	+40	8
England	3	2	0	1	59	57	+2	7
Argentina	3	1	0	2	69	59	+10	5
Canada	3	0	1	2	43	95	–52	4

10 December 2016
10:59

New Zealand	26 – 12	Argentina

Cape Town Stadium, Cape Town

10 December 2016
11:21

England	33 – 10	Canada

Cape Town Stadium, Cape Town

10 December 2016
14:20

New Zealand	19 – 19	Canada

Cape Town Stadium, Cape Town

10 December 2016
14:42

England	19 – 14	Argentina

Cape Town Stadium, Cape Town

10 December 2016
17:41

Argentina	43 – 14	Canada

Cape Town Stadium, Cape Town

10 December 2016
18:03

England	7 – 33	New Zealand

Cape Town Stadium, Cape Town

=== Pool D ===
Team	Pld	W	D	L	PF	PA	PD	Pts
Scotland	3	3	0	0	83	47	+36	9
Wales	3	2	0	1	67	31	+36	6
Samoa	3	1	0	2	48	43	+5	5
Uganda	3	0	0	3	19	96	–77	3

10 December 2016
10:15

Scotland	21 – 19	Samoa

Cape Town Stadium, Cape Town

10 December 2016
10:37

Wales	29 – 7	Uganda

Cape Town Stadium, Cape Town

10 December 2016
13:36

Scotland	38 – 7	Uganda

Cape Town Stadium, Cape Town

10 December 2016
13:58

Wales	17 – 0	Samoa

Cape Town Stadium, Cape Town

10 December 2016
16:57

Samoa	29 – 5	Uganda

Cape Town Stadium, Cape Town

10 December 2016
17:19

Wales	21 – 24	Scotland

Cape Town Stadium, Cape Town

== Knockout stage ==
=== 13th place ===
Semi-finals
11 December 2016 - 10:36 – Cape Town Stadium
Uganda	21
Japan	17
11 December 2016 - 10:58 – Cape Town Stadium
Samoa	24
Canada	26

13th Place Final
11 December 2016 - 11:20 – Cape Town Stadium
Uganda	10
Canada	19

=== Challenge trophy ===
Quarter-finals
11 December 2016 - 10:36 – Cape Town Stadium
Australia	42
Uganda	12
11 December 2016 - 10:58 – Cape Town Stadium
Argentina	33
Japan	12
11 December 2016 - 11:20 – Cape Town Stadium
Samoa	14
Russia	17
11 December 2015 - 11:42 – Cape Town Stadium
France	42
Canada	14

Semi-finals
11 December 2016 - 14:41 – Cape Town Stadium
Australia	17
Argentina	21
11 December 2016 - 15:03 – Cape Town Stadium
Russia	12
France	17

Challenge Trophy Final
11 December 2016 - 18:05 – Cape Town Stadium
Argentina	7
France	19

=== 5th place ===
Semi-finals
11 December 2016 - 15:50 – Cape Town Stadium
Wales	14
Kenya	19
11 December 2016 - 16:12 – Cape Town Stadium
United States	12
Fiji	28

5th Place Final
11 December 2016 - 18:36 – Cape Town Stadium
Kenya	21
Fiji	33

=== Cup ===
Quarter-finals
11 December 2016 - 12:04 – Cape Town Stadium
South Africa	33
Wales	0
11 December 2016 - 12:26 – Cape Town Stadium
New Zealand	28
Kenya	7
11 December 2016 - 12:48 – Cape Town Stadium
Scotland	24 (a.e.t.)
United States	19
11 December 2016 - 13:10 – Cape Town Stadium
Fiji	26
England	31

Semi-finals
11 December 2016 - 16:34 – Cape Town Stadium
South Africa	14
New Zealand	7
11 December 2016 - 16:56 – Cape Town Stadium
Scotland	14
England	33

Cup Final
11 December 2016 - 19:44 – Cape Town Stadium
South Africa	17
England	19
Bronze Medal Match
11 December 2016 – 19:18 - Cape Town Stadium
New Zealand	24
Scotland	19

== Tournament placings ==
Place	Team	Points
1st place, gold medalist(s)	England	22
2nd place, silver medalist(s)	South Africa	19
3rd place, bronze medalist(s)	New Zealand	17
4	Scotland	15
5	Fiji	13
6	Kenya	12
7	Wales	10
7	United States	10

Place	Team	Points
9	France	8
10	Argentina	7
11	Australia	5
11	Russia	5
13	Canada	3
14	Uganda	2
15	Samoa	1
15	Japan	1

Source: World Rugby (archived)

World Sevens Series XVIII
Preceded by 2016 Dubai Sevens	2016 South Africa Sevens	Succeeded by 2017 Wellington Sevens
South Africa Sevens
Preceded by 2015 South Africa Sevens	2016 South Africa Sevens	Succeeded by 2017 South Africa Sevens
