= Santa Monica Rugby Club =

American rugby union team from Santa Monica, California

(United States) Santa Monica Rugby Club
- Full name: Santa Monica Rugby Club
- Union: USA Rugby
- Nickname: Dolphins
- Founded: 1972
- Location: Santa Monica, California, US
- Ground: Various Santa Monica Fields
- President: Steven Johnson
- Coach(es): Stephen Stagg, Men's Head Coach; TJ Olsen, Women's Head Coach
- League(s): Southern California Rugby Football Union (SCRFU); Southern California Youth Rugby (SCYR)
Team kit

Official website
- www.santamonicarugby.com

Santa Monica Rugby Club is an American rugby union club from Santa Monica, California. The club teams, known as the Dolphins, compete in the Southern California Rugby Football Union (SCRFU), a territorial union of USA Rugby, currently fielding teams in the following divisions: Division 1 (men), Division 1 (women), Division 2 (women), U18 boys, U16 boys, U14 boys, U12 boys, U10 coed, and U8 coed.

== History ==
The Club was established in 1972 by rugby graduates of UCLA, USC and St. Mary's College. The club went undefeated in the SCRFU Division I, taking the championships in both the San Diego/OMBAC Tournament and the Monterey National Invitational. Santa Monica have continued their winning ways since their inaugural season in 1972/73, going on to win the SCRFU Division I title five times in total. The club has produced numerous National team players for the national team, some of which have skippered the USA.

The Club has won the SCRFU Division I league title seven times, captured top spot at the San Diego/OMBAC Tournament seven times, been to the national championships 8 times — winning on five occasions, and won at the Santa Barbara International Tournament.

In 2006, Santa Monica made a third consecutive final four appearance, defeating the Boston Irish Wolfhounds, 57 points to 19. After the 2006, Santa Monica was invited to join the US Rugby Super League for the 2007 season and the board of directors voted to accept the invitation to join. Santa Monica played in the Western Division. The Boston Irish Wolfhounds also accepted the invitation to join the expanded competition.

Santa Monica and other regional rugby power-houses Belmont Shore RFC (Long Beach, CA) and OMBAC RFC (San Diego) withdrew from the national Rugby Super League competition in favor of a Southern California Division 1 contest that has proven more competitive and cost effective.

== Players ==
Twenty Santa Monica Rugby Club players have represented the United States in international competition as USA Eagles — three of them captained the national side. Three additional Club players have represented the USA on the World XV. Former Club and USA Eagle captain Craig Sweeney is honored by the Club's Craig Sweeney Fund, tax-deductible contributions go to support the long-term goals of Santa Monica Rugby.

Every year, notable club members from past seasons are honored at the Hall of Fame dinner following the annual Golden Dolphins old boys match on Club Day.

Beginning in 2003, the Club has paired its annual Club Day and Old Boys Game with a Hall of Fame banquet, honoring notables from all decades.
