= 2017 Singapore Sevens =

- Sevens World Series XVIII
- Host nation: Singapore
- Date: 15–16 April 2017

Cup
- Champion: Canada
- Runner-up: United States
- Third: England

Challenge
- Winner: Wales

Tournament details
- Matches played: 45

The 2017 Singapore Sevens was the eighth tournament of the 2016–17 World Rugby Sevens Series. The tournament was played on 15–16 April 2017 at the Singapore National Stadium in Singapore. This was the sixth time that the Singapore Sevens had a spot on the World Rugby Sevens Series. In an exciting final, Canada completed the 'Miracle on Grass' by jumping out to an early lead and then scoring the decisive try with 2 minutes remaining to beat the United States 26-19 and win its first-ever World Series tournament. Earlier in the day, Canada had triumphed over New Zealand and England while the US defeated Fiji and Australia to set up the first Cup final featuring both North American teams.

== Format ==
Sixteen teams were drawn into four pools of four teams each. Each team played all the others in their pool once. The top two teams from each pool advanced to the Cup quarter finals. The bottom two teams from each group advanced to the Challenge Trophy quarter finals.

== Teams ==
- Argentina
- Australia
- Canada
- England
- Fiji
- France
- Japan
- Kenya
- New Zealand
- Russia
- Samoa
- Scotland
- South Africa
- United States
- Wales
- Hong Kong

== Pool Stages ==
=== Pool A ===
Teams	Pld	W	D	L	PF	PA	+/−	Pts
Fiji	3	3	0	0	113	14	+99	9
Canada	3	2	0	1	69	50	+19	7
Hong Kong	3	1	0	2	26	93	–67	5
Russia	3	0	0	3	41	92	–51	3

15 April 2017
12:30

Canada	28–15	Russia

National Stadium, Singapore

15 April 2017
12:52

Fiji	40–0	Hong Kong

National Stadium, Singapore

15 April 2017
15:28

Canada	34–0	Hong Kong

National Stadium, Singapore

15 April 2017
15:50

Fiji	38–7	Russia

National Stadium, Singapore

15 April 2017
19:44

Russia	19–26	Hong Kong

National Stadium, Singapore

15 April 2017
20:06

Fiji	35–7	Canada

National Stadium, Singapore

=== Pool B ===
Teams	Pld	W	D	L	PF	PA	+/−	Pts
England	3	2	0	1	71	46	+25	7
South Africa	3	2	0	1	74	24	+50	7
Japan	3	1	0	2	31	106	–75	5
France	3	1	0	2	45	45	0	5

15 April 2017
11:44

England	14–24	France

National Stadium, Singapore

15 April 2017
12:06

South Africa	52–0	Japan

National Stadium, Singapore

15 April 2017
14:44

England	40–10	Japan

National Stadium, Singapore

15 April 2017
15:06

South Africa	10–7	France

National Stadium, Singapore

15 April 2017
18:40

France	14–21	Japan

National Stadium, Singapore

15 April 2017
19:02

South Africa	12–17	England

National Stadium, Singapore

=== Pool C ===
Teams	Pld	W	D	L	PF	PA	+/−	Pts
Australia	3	3	0	0	67	26	+41	9
Kenya	3	2	0	1	46	43	+3	7
Argentina	3	1	0	2	31	48	–17	5
Samoa	3	0	0	3	26	53	–27	3

15 April 2017
11:00

Argentina	7–22	Kenya

National Stadium, Singapore

15 April 2017
11:22

Australia	19–12	Samoa

National Stadium, Singapore

15 April 2017
14:00

Argentina	17–7	Samoa

National Stadium, Singapore

15 April 2017
14:22

Australia	29–7	Kenya

National Stadium, Singapore

15 April 2017
17:56

Kenya	17–7	Samoa

National Stadium, Singapore

15 April 2017
18:18

Australia	19–7	Argentina

National Stadium, Singapore

=== Pool D ===
Teams	Pld	W	D	L	PF	PA	+/−	Pts
New Zealand	3	3	0	0	79	49	+30	9
United States	3	2	0	1	82	66	+16	7
Wales	3	1	0	2	54	90	–36	5
Scotland	3	0	0	3	66	76	–10	3

15 April 2017
13:14

New Zealand	22–21	Scotland

National Stadium, Singapore

15 April 2017
13:36

United States	35–19	Wales

National Stadium, Singapore

15 April 2017
16:12

New Zealand	36–14	Wales

National Stadium, Singapore

15 April 2017
16:34

United States	33–26	Scotland

National Stadium, Singapore

15 April 2017
20:28

Scotland	19–21	Wales

National Stadium, Singapore

15 April 2017
20:50

United States	14–21	New Zealand

National Stadium, Singapore

== Knockout stage ==
=== 13th place ===
Semi-finals
16 April 2017 – 14:28 – National Stadium
Hong Kong	7
Argentina	33
16 April 2017 – 14:50 – National Stadium
Russia	24
Japan	21

13th Place Final
16 April 2017 – 18:44 – National Stadium
Argentina	40
Russia	19

=== Challenge Trophy ===
Quarter-finals
16 April 2017 – 11:00 – National Stadium
Hong Kong	15
Scotland	26
16 April 2017 – 11:22 – National Stadium
Argentina	24
France	26
16 April 2017 – 11:44 – National Stadium
Wales	19
Russia	12
16 April 2017 – 12:06 – National Stadium
Japan	14
Samoa	26

Semi-finals
16 April 2017 – 15:12 – National Stadium
Scotland	31
France	12
16 April 2017 – 15:34 – National Stadium
Wales	19
Samoa	14

Challenge Trophy Final
16 April 2017 – 19:06 – National Stadium
Scotland	12
Wales	24

=== 5th place ===
Semi-finals
16 April 2017 – 16:26 – National Stadium
Fiji	14
South Africa	19
16 April 2017 – 16:48 – National Stadium
New Zealand	24
Kenya	21

5th Place Final
16 April 2017 – 19:41 – National Stadium
South Africa	12
New Zealand	17

=== Cup ===
Quarter-finals
16 April 2017 – 12:30 – National Stadium
Fiji	19
United States	24
16 April 2017 – 12:52 – National Stadium
Australia	19
South Africa	17
16 April 2017 – 13:14 – National Stadium
New Zealand	14
Canada	26
16 April 2017 – 13:36 – National Stadium
England	13
Kenya	12

Semi-finals
16 April 2017 – 17:10 – National Stadium
United States	40
Australia	7
16 April 2017 – 17:32 – National Stadium
Canada	17
England	5

Cup Final
16 April 2017 – 20:30 – National Stadium
United States	19
Canada	26
Bronze Medal Match
16 April 2017 – 20:05 – National Stadium
Australia	12
England	14

== Tournament placings ==
Place	Team	Points
1st place, gold medalist(s)	Canada	22
2nd place, silver medalist(s)	United States	19
3rd place, bronze medalist(s)	England	17
4	Australia	15
5	New Zealand	13
6	South Africa	12
7	Fiji	10
7	Kenya	10

Place	Team	Points
9	Wales	8
10	Scotland	7
11	France	5
11	Samoa	5
13	Argentina	3
14	Russia	2
15	Hong Kong	1
15	Japan	1

Source: World Rugby (archived)

== See also ==
- 2016-17 World Rugby Sevens Series

World Sevens Series XVIII
Preceded by 2017 Hong Kong Sevens	2017 Singapore Sevens	Succeeded by 2017 Paris Sevens
Singapore Sevens
Preceded by 2016 Singapore Sevens	2017 Singapore Sevens	Succeeded by 2018 Singapore Sevens
