= Perry Baker =

American rugby sevens player (born 1986)

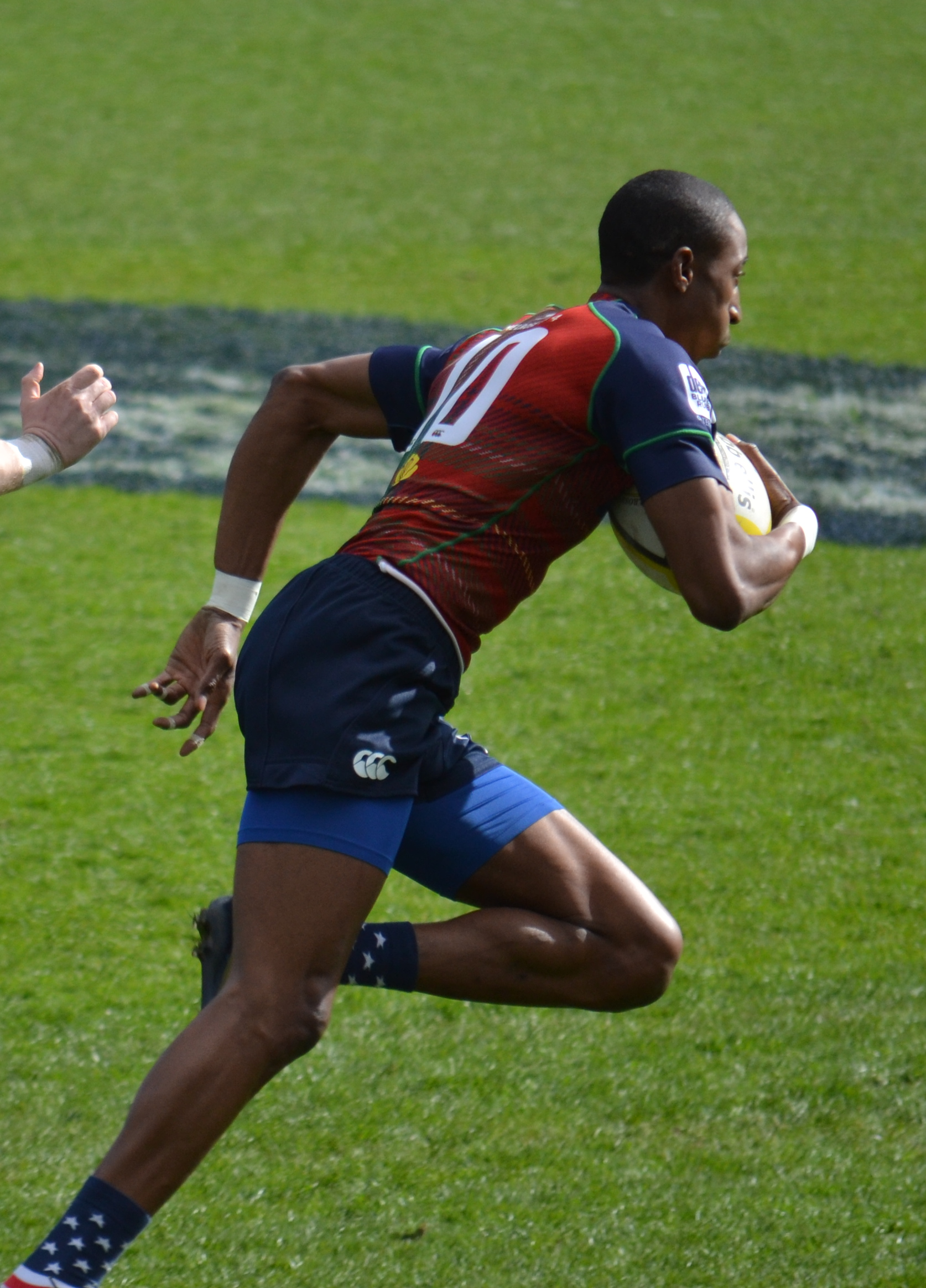
- Baker in 2014

Personal information
- Born: June 29, 1986 (age 40) New Smyrna Beach, Florida, U.S.
- Height: 6 ft 1 in (185 cm)
- Weight: 170 lb (77 kg; 12 st 2 lb)

Rugby union career
- Position: Wing
Amateur team(s)
Years	Team	Apps	(Points)
2013–2014	Tiger Rugby (Ohio)		
–	1823 (Ohio)		
Senior career
Years	Team	Apps	(Points)
2025–	Kalinga Black Tigers		
National sevens team
Years	Team		Comps
2014–2024	United States		349 (1,467; 293t)
- Correct as of October 24, 2024

Sport
- Football career

Profile
- Position: Wide receiver

Career information
- High school: Spruce Creek High School
- College: Fairmont State (2006–2010)
- NFL draft: 2011: undrafted

Career history
- Philadelphia Eagles (2011)*; Pittsburgh Power (2012–2013)
- * Offseason or practice squad member only

Career AFL statistics
- Receptions: 28
- Receiving yards: 332
- Receiving touchdowns: 2
- Stats at ArenaFan.com

Perry Baker (born June 29, 1986) is an American former rugby union player who played for the United States national rugby sevens team. He is a two-time World Rugby Sevens Player of the Year. At the time of his retirement, with 293 tries Baker ranked first among Americans and second among all international players in tries scored. He also ranked 7th on the all-time point-scoring list with 1,467.

== Early life ==
Baker attended Spruce Creek High School.

== College career ==
Baker played college football for NCAA Division II Fairmont State University in West Virginia. He graduated from Fairmont State in 2010 with a degree in Criminal Justice.

== Professional football career ==
Baker was signed by the Philadelphia Eagles of the National Football League (NFL) in July 2011, but he suffered a knee injury that cut short his NFL career. Baker played two seasons for the Pittsburgh Power of the Arena Football League from 2012 to 2013.

== Rugby career ==
=== Early career ===
Baker was introduced to rugby by one of Baker's former high school football coaches in 2006. Baker played with the Daytona Beach Coconuts in 2012, leading them to a ninth-place finish at the club sevens national tournament. Baker took up rugby full-time in 2013 and joined the Tiger Rugby Academy in Columbus, Ohio, working under coach Paul Holmes.

=== U.S. national team ===
==== 2014–16 ====
Baker signed a full-time contract with the U.S. Eagles in July 2014 to join the residency program at the U.S. Olympic Training Center in San Diego, California. Baker made his debut at the 2014 Gold Coast Sevens in Australia, where he entered the U.S. team's first match against Canada as a second-half substitute. Baker's first start and first try came in the U.S. team's third match of that tournament, against Argentina; he scored his first hat-trick also in that tournament, in the knockout rounds against Portugal.

Baker played an instrumental role in the U.S. team's first-ever victory over New Zealand, scoring both tries in their 14–12 victory at the 2015 Dubai Sevens. During the 2015–16 World Rugby Sevens Series Baker scored 48 tries during the season, a record high for a US player. Baker was second only to South Africa's Seabelo Senatla in tries for the season, and Baker earned a place on the World Rugby dream team for the 2015–16 season.

Baker was a member of the United States men's rugby team at the 2016 Summer Olympics in Rio. He scored a try in the second half of the team's final pool match against Fiji. The team did not advance past pool play.

==== 2016–2020 ====
Baker had a productive 2016–17 season. At the 2016 South Africa Sevens, in the absence of regular captain Madison Hughes, Baker was named U.S. team captain for the tournament. At the 2017 Singapore Sevens, Baker ran 100 meters from his own in-goal area to score a try against Wales, which was voted by World Rugby as one of the tries of the tournament; in the match against Scotland Baker beat four defenders to set up a try for Stephen Tomasin, which was also voted as one of the best tries of the 2017 Singapore Sevens tournament. At the 2017 Paris Sevens Baker scored another length-of-the-field try, which was voted one of the best tries of the tournament. Baker finished the 2016–17 World Series with 57 tries, more than any other player. Baker's accomplishments were recognized by World Rugby. He was one of seven players named to the 2017 World Series Dream Team. He received the 2017 World Rugby Sevens Player of the Year award, beating out Fiji's Jerry Tuwai and South Africa's Roscko Specman.

Baker started slowly in the 2017–18 season, missing almost all of the first two tournaments due to a concussion. Baker was an important part of the U.S. victory at the 2018 USA Sevens, the team's first tournament win on home soil. Baker scored all of the team's three tries in the 17–12 quarterfinal win over England. In the semifinal against Fiji with the U.S. down 0–7 at halftime, Baker sparked the team with two second-half tries for a 19–7 comeback win. In the final against Argentina, Baker opened the scoring with a try en route to a 28–0 victory. Baker was leading all players in tries scored for the 2017–18 season before a shoulder injury would cause him to miss the last few tournaments of the season.

Baker had a quiet 2018–19 season, missing several tournaments due to injury.

On February 29, 2020, Baker became the second USA player, after his teammate Carlin Isles, to score 200 tries. He completed this feat in a 33–12 victory match against Scotland during the 2019-20 World Rugby Sevens Series in Los Angeles.

==== 2024 Summer Olympics ====
At the 2024 Summer Olympics in Paris, Baker was the team's leading scorer in the group stage, led by four tries scored in a win against Uruguay national rugby sevens team that qualified the Eagles for a berth in the quarterfinals for the first time. Baker led all players in the Paris Olympics with six total tries and 30 points scored (tied with Fiji's Iowane Teba).

==== Retirement ====
Baker announced in March 2024 that he intended to retire following the 2024 Summer Olympics in Paris.

==== Return from retirement ====
Baker came out of retirement to play for the Kalinga Black Tigers in the Rugby Premier League.

=== Season by season ===
WR Sevens Series
WR 7s Season	Tries Scored	USA Rank	World Rank	Accolades
2014–15	28	2nd	10th	
2015–16	48	1st	2nd	World Series Dream Team
2016–17	57	1st	1st	2017 World Rugby Sevens Player of the Year; World Series Dream Team
2017–18	37	2nd	t4th	2018 World Rugby Sevens Player of the Year
2018–19	16	t5th	—	
2019–20	19	2nd	4th	
2020–21	—N/a	—N/a	—N/a	
2021–22	23	1st	t15th	
2022–23	35	1st	4th	
2023–24	25	1st	3rd	
Career	293	1st	2nd	

== Personal life ==
Baker's older brother Dallas is a National Football League, Arena Football League and Canadian Football League player. Perry is the nephew of former NFL player and coach Wes Chandler.
