= 2015–16 United States national rugby sevens team season =

United States
2015–16 season

The United States national rugby sevens team season began the 2015–16 World Rugby Sevens Series by "shocking the world" when it defeated New Zealand for the first time at 2015 Dubai Sevens. The United States team beat the 12-time World Series champion in pool play and again in the tournament's third-place match before a third victory in as many matches in the 2015 South Africa Sevens Plate Semifinal. The U.S. once again finished the season in sixth, tying its best ever finish. The previous season's scoring records were broken again, as Perry Baker notched 48 tries and Madison Hughes scored 331 points.

== World Rugby Sevens Series ==
| Leg | Date | Finish | Record (W-L-D) | Leading Try Scorer | Leading Points Scorer | Dream Team selection |
|---|---|---|---|---|---|---|
| Dubai | December 2015 | 3rd | 4 – 2 | Perry Baker (6) | Perry Baker (30) | Perry Baker |
| South Africa | December 2015 | 6th | 3 – 3 | Madison Hughes (5) | Madison Hughes (59) | — |
| New Zealand | January 2016 | T-7th | 2 – 3 | Carlin Isles (4) | Madison Hughes (21) | — |
| Australia | February 2016 | T-7th | 2 – 3 | Perry Baker (5) | Madison Hughes (30) | — |
| United States | March 2016 | 4th | 2 – 2 – 1 | Perry Baker (5) | Perry Baker (25) | Perry Baker |
| Canada | March 2016 | 6th | 3 – 3 | Perry Baker (8) | Madison Hughes (48) | Martin Iosefo |
| Hong Kong | April 2016 | 6th | 4 – 2 | Perry Baker (7) | Perry Baker (35) | – |
| Singapore | April 2016 | 10th | 3 – 3 | Zack Test (6) | Madison Hughes (34) | – |
| France | May 2016 | 11th | 2–3 | Zack Test (5) | Zack Test (25) | – |
| England | May 2016 | 3rd | 3–2–1 | Perry Baker (8) | Perry Baker (40) | Perry Baker |
| | | 6th | | Perry Baker (48) | Madison Hughes (331) | Perry Baker (3) |

=== Dubai Sevens ===
Coming into the tournament, the U.S. had lost 28 consecutive matches to New Zealand. In pool play at the 2015 Dubai Sevens, however, the U.S. notched its first win, despite missing regular forwards Danny Barrett and Andrew Durutalo. The U.S. won 14–12 behind two tries from Perry Baker, and a touchline conversion from Madison Hughes at the end of the match.

2015 Dubai Sevens pool play: U.S. lineup vs. New Zealand
| Player | Position |
|---|---|
| Garrett Bender | Forward |
| Zack Test | Forward |
| Matai Leuta | Forward |
| Folau Niua | Scrum-half |
| Madison Hughes | Fly-half |
| Maka Unufe | Center |
| Perry Baker | Wing |

== Players ==
=== World Series ===
Leading U.S. players (2015–16 WS season)
| Player | Matches | Caps | Tackles | Tries | Points |
|---|---|---|---|---|---|
| Perry Baker | 55 | 10 | 78 | 48 | 240 |
| Folau Niua | 55 | 10 | 87 | 11 | 55 |
| Madison Hughes | 54 | 10 | 118 | 23 | 331 |
| Zack Test | 49 | 9 | 89 | 22 | 110 |
| Danny Barrett | 42 | 8 | 25 | 6 | 30 |
| Garrett Bender | 39 | 8 | 67 | 4 | 20 |
| Martin Iosefo | 37 | 7 | 31 | 10 | 50 |
| Ben Pinkelman | 36 | 7 | 42 | 8 | 40 |
| Maka Unufe | 34 | 7 | 31 | 10 | 50 |
| Nate Augspurger | 32 | 9 | 25 | 3 | 35 |
| Carlin Isles | 27 | 5 | 30 | 16 | 80 |
| Thretton Palamo | 23 | 6 | 12 | 2 | 10 |
| Matai Leuta | 19 | | 21 | 2 | 10 |

Updated: May 23, 2016

=== 2016 Summer Olympics squad ===
The table below shows the U.S. roster assembled for the most recent tournament. The statistics (events, points, and tries) refer to statistics generated in World Rugby Sevens Series tournaments.

Tournament squad
| Player | Age | Events | Points | Tries |
|---|---|---|---|---|
| Zack Test | 36 | 60 | 691 | 137 |
| Madison Hughes (c) | 33 | 21 | 665 | 49 |
| Folau Niua | 41 | 38 | 380 | 39 |
| Carlin Isles | 36 | 28 | 380 | 76 |
| Perry Baker | 39 | 17 | 335 | 67 |
| Chris Wyles | 42 | 13 | 270 | 54 |
| Maka Unufe | 34 | 21 | 185 | 37 |
| Danny Barrett | 35 | 21 | 162 | 32 |
| Andrew Durutalo | 38 | 28 | 127 | 25 |
| Martin Iosefo | 36 | 11 | 60 | 12 |
| Garrett Bender | 34 | 22 | 55 | 11 |
| Ben Pinkelman | 31 | 5 | 30 | 6 |
| Nate Ebner | 37 | 2 | 10 | 2 |

Training squad
| Player | Age | Events | Points | Tries |
|---|---|---|---|---|
| Shalom Suniula | 37 | 41 | 328 | 20 |
| Nick Edwards | 41 | 30 | 265 | 53 |
| Kevin Swiryn | 41 | 13 | 180 | 36 |
| Will Holder | 34 | 6 | 57 | 11 |
| Peter Tiberio | 36 | 16 | 42 | 8 |
| Thretton Palamo | 37 | 17 | 35 | 7 |
| Nate Augspurger | 35 | 13 | 32 | 2 |
| Matai Leuta | 35 | 6 | 20 | 4 |
| Stephen Tomasin | 31 | 4 | 5 | 1 |
| Brett Thompson | 35 | 18 | 0 | 0 |
| Pat Blair | 36 | 8 | 0 | 0 |
| ConRoy Smith | 34 | 0 | 0 | 0 |
| Joey Sok | 31 | 0 | 0 | 0 |
