= Samoa Toloa =

- Born: May 6, 1993 (age 33)
- Height: 1.75 m (5 ft 9 in)
- Weight: 74 kg (163 lb; 11 st 9 lb)

Rugby union career
International career
Years	Team	Apps	(Points)
- Samoa U-20
National sevens team
Years	Team		Comps
- Samoa

Samoa Toloa (born May 6, 1993) is a Samoan rugby union player. He plays for Samoa's national sevens team. Toloa has played 89 games for Samoa. He was also a member of the squad that played at the 2014 Commonwealth Games. In 2016 he was named in the squads to Wellington, Sydney, Las Vegas and Vancouver for the 2015–16 World Rugby Sevens Series.
