= Nate Ebner =

American football and rugby sevens player (born 1988)

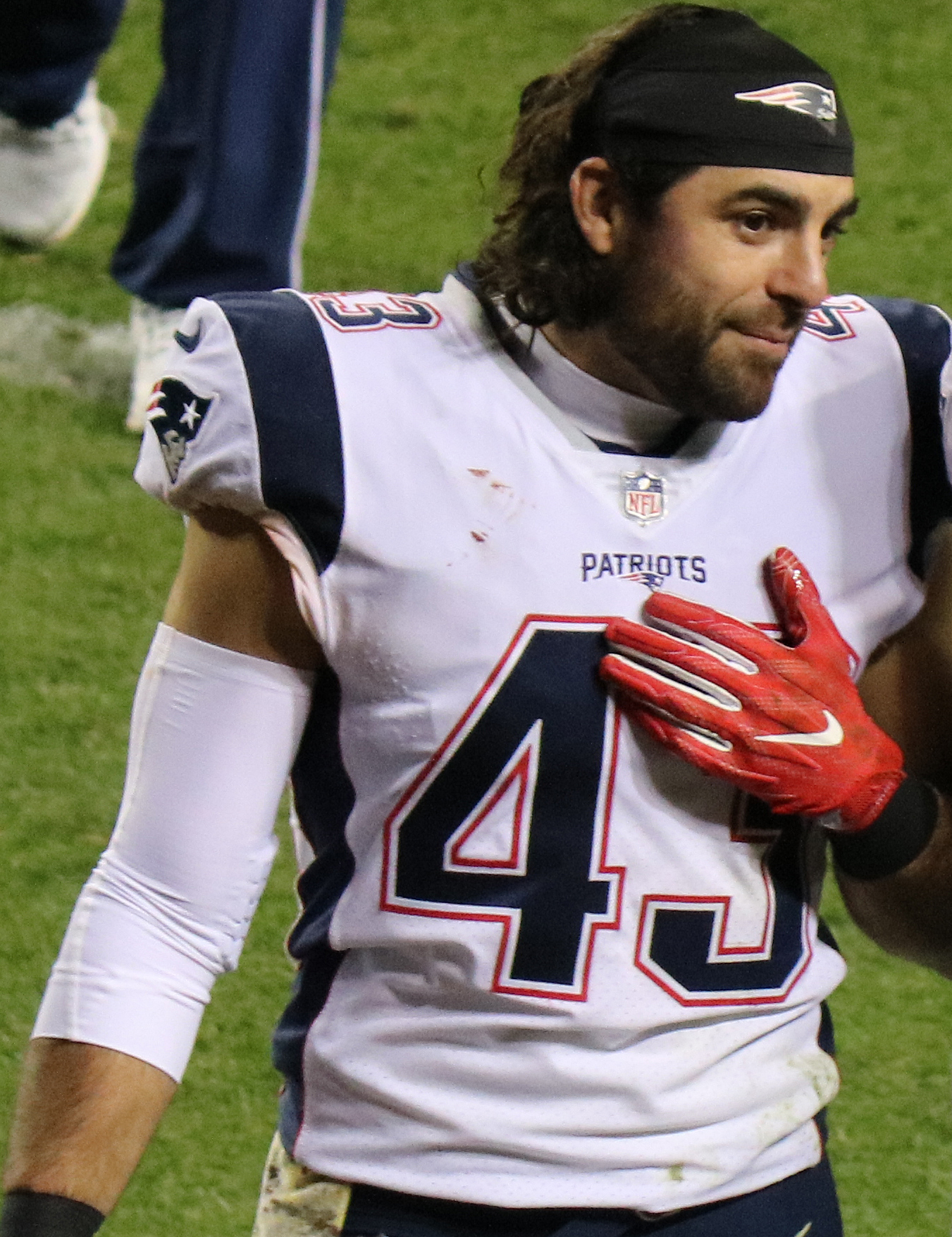
- Ebner with the New England Patriots in 2017

No. 43
- Positions: Safety, upback

Personal information
- Born: December 14, 1988 (age 37); Dublin, Ohio, U.S.
- Listed height: 6 ft 0 in (1.83 m)
- Listed weight: 215 lb (98 kg)

Career information
- High school: Hilliard Davidson (Hilliard, Ohio)
- College: Ohio State
- NFL draft: 2012: 6th round, 197th overall pick

Career history
- New England Patriots (2012–2019); New York Giants (2020–2021)

Awards and highlights
- 3× Super Bowl champion (XLIX, LI, LIII); Second-team All-Pro (2016)

Career NFL statistics
- Total tackles: 105
- Forced fumbles: 1
- Fumble recoveries: 3
- Stats at Pro Football Reference

Nathan Ebner (born December 14, 1988) is an American former professional football player who was a safety and special teamer in the National Football League (NFL). He was a rugby sevens player for the United States national rugby sevens team.

Ebner played rugby union on the US Under-19 and Under-20 national teams, and was named MVP for the teams at both the 2007 and 2008 IRB Junior World Championships. He later played rugby sevens for the US national team at the 2016 Summer Olympics.

Despite not having played high school football, in his junior year of college he then walked on to and played college football for the Ohio State Buckeyes. In 36 career college games, Ebner had 30 tackles as a special teams player from 2009 to 2011.

Ebner was selected by the New England Patriots in the sixth round of the 2012 NFL draft. He earned Super Bowl rings in Super Bowl XLIX against the Seattle Seahawks in 2015, Super Bowl LI against the Atlanta Falcons in 2017, and Super Bowl LIII against the Los Angeles Rams in 2019.

Ebner and Patrick Chung are minority owners of the New England Free Jacks of Major League Rugby.

== Early life ==
Ebner was born in Dublin, Ohio, the son of Nancy Pritchett and Jeffrey Ebner.

His father, who was Jewish, was a former college rugby player at the University of Minnesota, and Sunday School principal at Temple Shalom in Springfield, Ohio. He was beaten to death at age 53 during an attempted robbery in November 2008 at the family business, Ebner & Sons auto reclamation in Springfield. In July 2010, his father's killer was sentenced to life in prison for murder, with the possibility of parole after 15 years. Ebner said:

My [late] dad was my only role model. Looking back on it, you had your favorite players, but they were just players. But a role model, and the way you carry yourself and how you go about your work – what hard work really means – and to be a man ... every aspect of life. To me, my dad was that role model, 100 percent. There wasn't anyone else I wanted to be like more than him.

Ebner is Jewish, and said of his father: "He taught me the importance of being Jewish with holidays like Chanukah and Passover, and I spent some time at Sunday Hebrew school. My dad stressed finishing strong in every task I did, and conduct myself always in a proper manner." He said his grandparents continue to be a big influence in his life, and "make sure I keep up with Jewish events and that I remember my origins."

Ebner was raised in Mason, Ohio, until sixth grade, and then in Columbus, Ohio. He attended Hilliard Davidson High School, but did not play football there.

== Junior rugby career ==
Ebner was a standout rugby union player on the U.S. age-group national teams. He was named MVP of the USA team at both the under-19 IRB Junior World Championship in 2007, and the under-20 IRB Junior World Championship in 2008.

== College football career ==
Ebner attended Ohio State University, where he majored in exercise science. Ebner did not play football his first two years of college, as he was competing internationally in rugby, but then in his junior year he walked-on the Buckeyes. Although he had not played football in high school, by year's end he was nevertheless considered the team's best special teams player. He played only a handful of plays from scrimmage at nickelback as a backup, but did record a sack. He ran the 40-yard-dash in 4.48.

He was given a football scholarship his senior year, based on his special teams skills. In 2011, during which Ebner had 11 tackles, he was voted the team's most inspirational player, receiving the Bo Rein Award, and the team's best special teams player, earning the Ike Kelley Award. He was a three-time Big Ten Conference All-Academic honoree.

Ebner was nicknamed "Leonidas," after a Greek warrior-king hero of Sparta portrayed by Gerard Butler in the movie 300, because of his intense workout regimen, and his beard. Paul Haynes, the Buckeyes' co-defensive coordinator and safeties coach, said: "He has a passion for being great .... He was probably the most valuable player on that whole team last year." Asked which special teams unit he enjoyed playing on the most at Ohio State, Ebner's said: "Kickoff, probably. Because ... I just enjoy running down as fast as you can. It's just mayhem, it's exciting, it's crazy. It's such a rush.... It's just one big blur, and then it's over.... Maybe I got a screw loose."

In his 36 career games, Ebner had 30 tackles from 2009 to 2011. Pro Football Weekly described him as a player who "races down the field like a bat out of hell, and hunts returners like a heat-seeking missile".

== Professional football career ==
Pre-draft measurables
Height	Weight	Arm length	Hand span	40-yard dash	10-yard split	20-yard split	20-yard shuttle	Three-cone drill	Vertical jump	Broad jump	Bench press
6 ft 0 in (1.83 m)	202 lb (92 kg)	31 3/8 in (0.80 m)	9 in (0.23 m)	4.53 s	1.56 s	2.64 s	4.04 s	6.59 s	39.0 in (0.99 m)	10 ft 8 in (3.25 m)	23 reps
All values from Ohio State's Pro Day

=== New England Patriots ===
Ebner was selected by the New England Patriots in the sixth round of the 2012 NFL draft, 197th overall. He signed a four-year contract for $2,196,600 with a $96,600 signing bonus. He had considered playing rugby, but he was not offered a contract with a professional team.

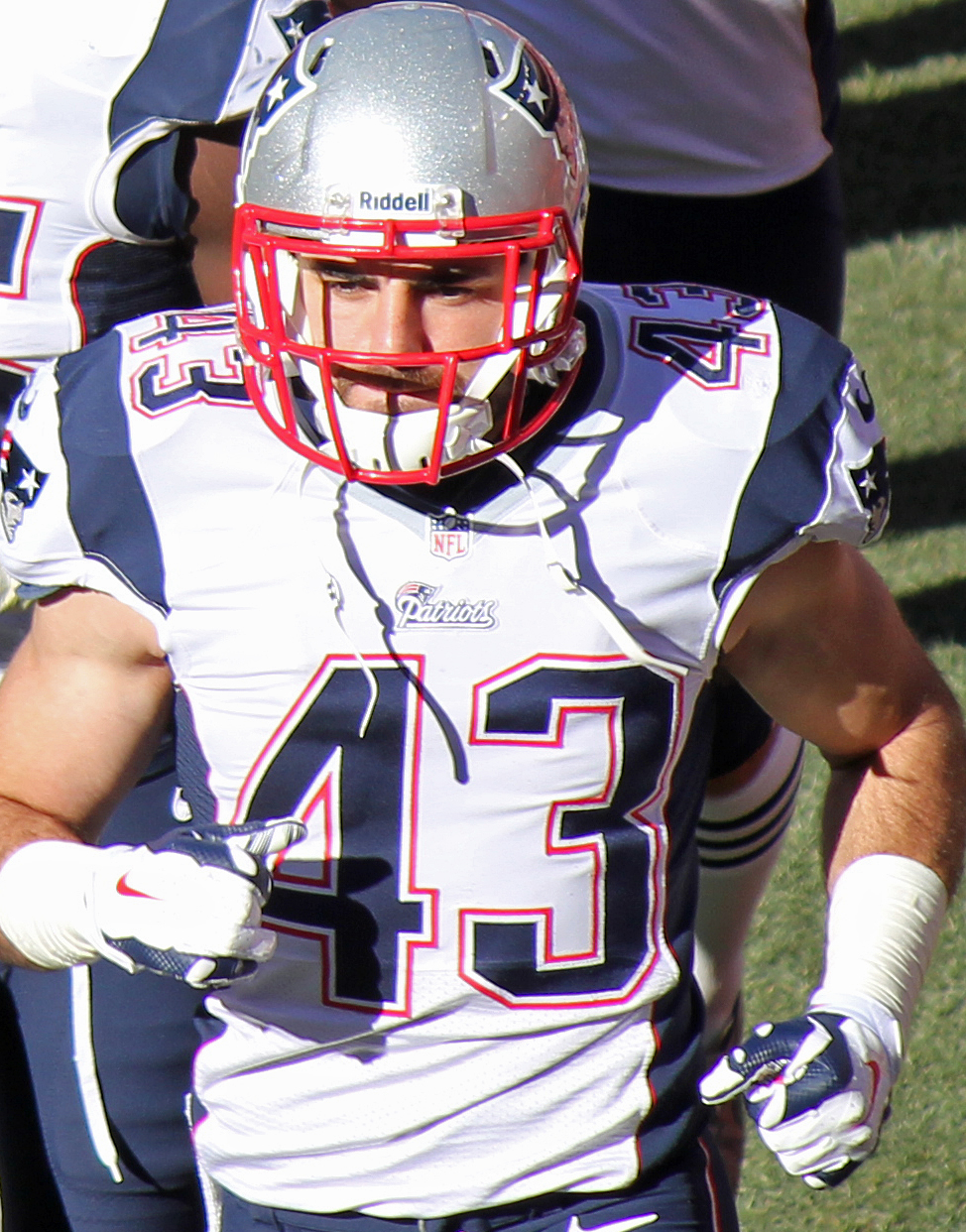
Ebner in 2014

During his rookie season, Ebner played in 15 regular-season games and both playoff games, and finished second on the team both in special teams tackles (17) and special teams snaps (297, or 61%). He also played 36 snaps at safety. In two playoff games, he had one tackle. Ebner continued to play primarily on special teams for New England in 2013, playing only sparingly on defense. He played in 15 regular season games, in which he had 9 tackles and 2 fumble recoveries, and 2 playoff games. In the Patriots' Week 12 victory over the Denver Broncos, Ebner recovered a muffed punt that hit Broncos cornerback Tony Carter to set up Stephen Gostkowski's game-winning field goal. The recovery capped a 24-point comeback, a franchise record at the time.

Ebner won his first Super Bowl ring when the Patriots won Super Bowl XLIX after the 2014 season. He played 48 percent of special teams snaps, making 11 tackles (second on the team), while missing four games with a broken thumb during the 2014 season. Coach Bill Belichick said:

His development has really been outstanding. I would probably put him in the, not the all-time top, but maybe in the top-five percent all time of players that I've coached, from where they were in college to how they grew in the NFL. [He] has adapted in a relatively short amount of time to the knowledge of our defense, to the understanding of opponents' offenses, to instinctiveness and reading and recognition at a position that he plays right in the middle of the field, which is among the most difficult – inside linebacker and safety – where the number of things that can happen is the greatest.

On December 6, 2015, against the Philadelphia Eagles, Ebner attempted a rare onside drop kick on a kickoff after a Patriots touchdown. The Eagles recovered the kick at their own 41-yard line.

On March 12, 2016, Ebner agreed to terms with the Patriots on a new two-year deal for $2.4 million. Ebner led the Patriots with 19 special teams tackles, forcing one fumble, through 16 games played. He was named to the 2016 AP All-Pro Second Team at the Special Teamer position; he received 12 votes, second only to teammate Matthew Slater's 14.

On February 5, 2017, Ebner was part of the Patriots team that won Super Bowl LI. In the game, he recorded one tackle as the Patriots defeated the Atlanta Falcons by a score of 34–28 in overtime. The Patriots overcame the largest deficit in Super Bowl history, overcoming a 28–3 deficit in the third quarter to tie the game and win it in the first-ever Super Bowl overtime period.

In 2017–18, Ebner missed Weeks 1 and 2 with a shoulder injury. On November 27, 2017, the Patriots placed Ebner on injured reserve after he tore his ACL on a successful fake punt play during a win against the Miami Dolphins in Week 12, leading to him playing in only nine games for the season, but in those games he had eight special teams tackles which was the most on the team at the time of his injury. The Patriots made it to Super Bowl LII, but lost 41–33 to the Philadelphia Eagles.

On March 13, 2018, Ebner signed a two-year contract extension with the Patriots. The Patriots defeated the Los Angeles Rams in Super Bowl LIII 13–3, earning Ebner a third Super Bowl ring.

In the 2019 season, Ebner appeared in 14 regular season games and the Patriots' Wild Card Round loss to the Tennessee Titans. He played a majority of special teams snaps in all 15 games.

=== New York Giants ===
On March 26, 2020, Ebner signed a one-year contract with the New York Giants, uniting him with former Patriots special teams coordinator and newly appointed Giants head coach Joe Judge.

On September 7, 2021, Ebner re-signed with the Giants. On November 24, Ebner was placed on injured reserve.

== NFL career statistics ==
Legend
**Bold**	Career high

=== Regular season ===
Year	Team	Games		Tackles					Interceptions					Fumbles			
Year	Team	GP	GS	Cmb	Solo	Ast	Sck	TFL	Int	Yds	TD	Lng	PD	FF	FR	Yds	TD
2012	NWE	15	0	14	12	2	0.0	0	0	0	0	0	0	0	0	0	0
2013	NWE	15	0	9	3	6	0.0	0	0	0	0	0	0	0	**2**	0	0
2014	NWE	12	0	11	7	4	0.0	0	0	0	0	0	0	0	0	0	0
2015	NWE	15	0	13	10	3	0.0	0	0	0	0	0	0	0	0	0	0
2016	NWE	16	0	**19**	**13**	6	0.0	0	0	0	0	0	0	**1**	1	0	0
2017	NWE	9	0	8	5	3	0.0	0	0	0	0	0	0	0	0	0	0
2018	NWE	15	0	13	4	**9**	0.0	0	0	0	0	0	0	0	0	0	0
2019	NWE	14	0	8	7	1	0.0	0	0	0	0	0	0	0	0	0	0
2020	NYG	16	0	8	6	2	0.0	0	0	0	0	0	**1**	0	0	0	0
2021	NYG	6	0	2	2	0	0.0	0	0	0	0	0	0	0	0	0	0
		133	0	105	69	36	0.0	0	0	0	0	0	1	1	3	0	0

=== Postseason ===
Year	Team	Games		Tackles					Interceptions					Fumbles			
Year	Team	GP	GS	Cmb	Solo	Ast	Sck	TFL	Int	Yds	TD	Lng	PD	FF	FR	Yds	TD
2012	NWE	2	0	2	1	**1**	0.0	0	0	0	0	0	0	0	0	0	0
2013	NWE	2	0	0	0	0	0.0	0	0	0	0	0	0	0	0	0	0
2014	NWE	3	0	0	0	0	0.0	0	0	0	0	0	0	0	0	0	0
2015	NWE	2	0	1	0	**1**	0.0	0	0	0	0	0	0	0	0	0	0
2016	NWE	3	0	**3**	**2**	**1**	0.0	0	0	0	0	0	0	0	0	0	0
2018	NWE	3	0	2	**2**	0	0.0	0	0	0	0	0	0	0	0	0	0
2019	NWE	1	0	0	0	0	0.0	0	0	0	0	0	0	0	0	0	0
		16	0	8	5	3	0.0	0	0	0	0	0	0	0	0	0	0

== Rugby sevens career ==
Nate Ebner
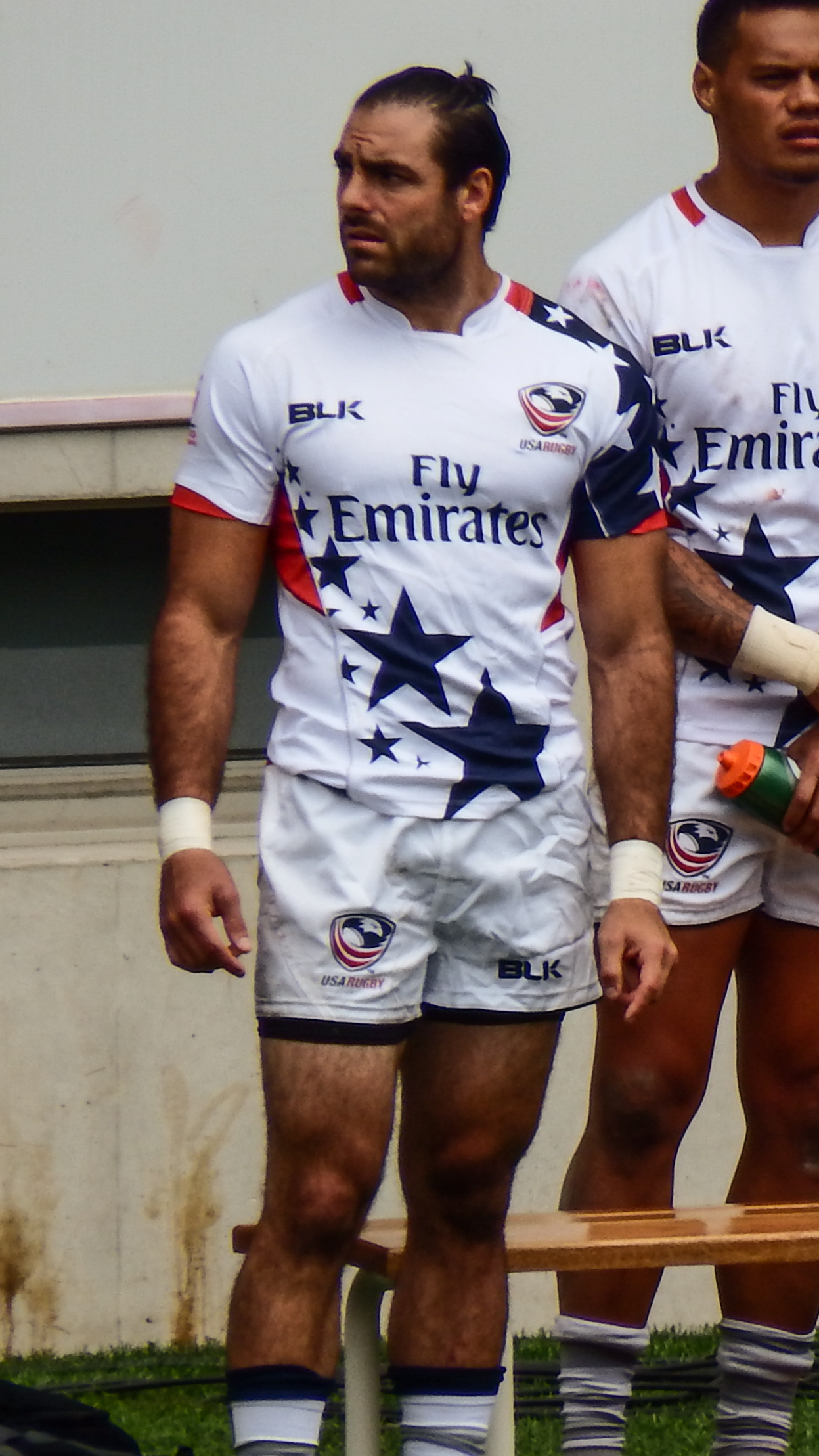

Rugby union career
- Position: Flanker/outside centre
Amateur team(s)
Years	Team	Apps	(Points)
2008–2012	Ohio State		
International career
Years	Team	Apps	(Points)
2007	United States U19		
2008	United States U20	5	(5)
National sevens team
Years	Team		Comps
2016	United States		3 (20)
- Correct as of January 4, 2019

=== United States national team ===
Three days after Ebner signed his 2016 contract, the Patriots granted Ebner a leave of absence to try out for the United States national rugby sevens team for the 2016 Summer Olympics, His transfer to rugby sevens followed in the footsteps of Sonny Bill Williams, Bryan Habana, and Quade Cooper, who were rugby union stars also attempting to qualify for the Olympics.

In an April 2016 interview, USA sevens head coach Mike Friday recalled that when Ebner first approached him about trying out for the Olympic team, Friday placed Ebner's chances of making the team at "10 or 20 percent." However, after strong showings in the Hong Kong and Singapore events on the World Rugby Sevens circuit, Friday said, "He has a 50:50 chance now but if he stays on this trajectory then it's only going one way and that's up." Friday added that Ebner played a critical role in improving the team's on-field communication. According to Friday, one of Ebner's first questions upon arriving at the USA training camp was whether the team had a "comms book." Friday was unfamiliar with the term, and Ebner pointed out that the Patriots provide all players with a manual of common on-field language, with all terms tightly defined. While the sevens team had operated with a set of common words, Friday and the rest of the coaching staff analyzed the team's communications and found that many players had different definitions for the same term. In the interview, Friday indicated, "That's exactly what I wanted from Nate. From being a newbie in the environment, he'd recognised an area we could improve."

Ebner's efforts proved successful: in July 2016 he was named to the 2016 US rugby sevens team. While with the rugby team, the Patriots received a roster exemption for Ebner, so he did not count against the Patriots' 90-man limit for training camp.

=== 2016 Summer Olympics ===
Ebner played in the team's first two matches, a 17–14 loss to Argentina and a 26–0 shutout of host Brazil. During the latter match, Ebner scored a try in the first half, and was sent to the sin bin for two minutes in the second half for an illegal tackle. Playing against Fiji in the final pool match, Ebner scored a try to make the score 24–19 in favor of Fiji with just over one minute to play, but the Eagles were unable to score the conversion. As a result, the US team fell two points (in scoring differential) short of advancing to medal play; they ultimately finished ninth.

=== Post Olympics and 2020 Summer Olympics ===
During the Patriots' 2018 offseason, Ebner served as an in-studio analyst for NBC Sports' coverage of the 2018 Rugby World Cup Sevens.

In 2018, Ebner became a minority owner in the New England Free Jacks, a Major League Rugby team, as did his Patriot teammate Patrick Chung.

With support from the New York Giants, he rejoined the USA's men's national sevens team in March 2021 in the hope of being named to the roster for the 2020 Summer Olympics in Tokyo. However, on June 22, 2021, Ebner withdrew from the team, citing recovery from an off-season surgery not aligning with the Games.

== Personal life ==
In May 2021, Ebner wrote a memoir about his relationship with his father, Finish Strong: A Father's Code and a Son's Path. (Penguin House)

== See also ==
- List of select Jewish football players
- List of players who switched from rugby and American football
