= Sione Molia =

New Zealand rugby union player

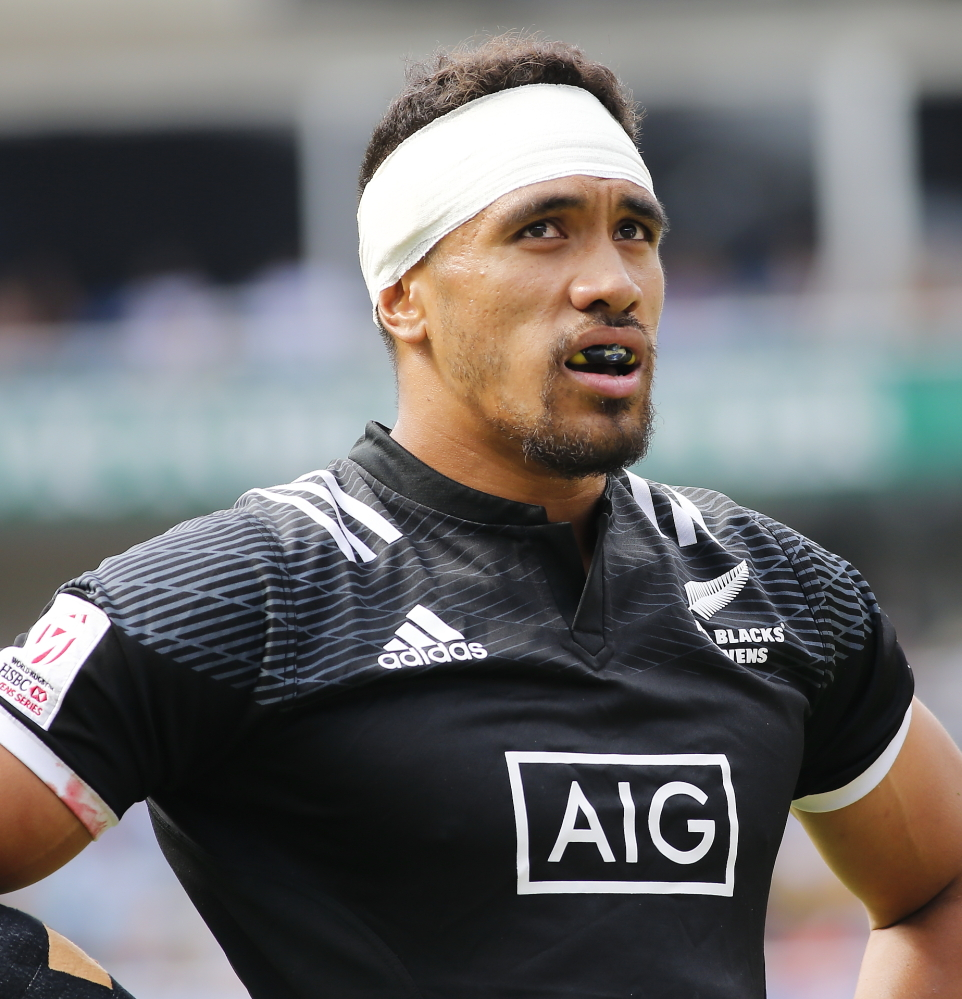
- Molia in 2017
- Born: 5 September 1993 (age 33) Auckland, New Zealand
- Height: 1.86 m (6 ft 1 in)
- Weight: 95 kg (209 lb)
- School: Wesley College

Rugby union career
- Position(s): Wing, Centre
- Current team: Counties Manukau
Senior career
Years	Team	Apps	(Points)
2013–	Counties Manukau	26	(35)
- Correct as of 1 December 2023
National sevens team
Years	Team		Comps
2016–	New Zealand		54
- Correct as of 1 December 2023
Medal record
Men's rugby sevens
Representing New Zealand
Summer Olympics
Silver medal – second place	2020 Tokyo	Team competition
Commonwealth Games
Bronze medal – third place	2022 Birmingham	Team competition
Gold medal – first place	2018 Gold Coast	Team competition
Rugby World Cup Sevens
Silver medal – second place	2022 Cape Town	Team competition

Sione Molia (born 5 September 1993) is a New Zealand professional rugby union player who plays as a centre for National Provincial Championship club Counties Manukau and the New Zealand national sevens team.

== International career ==
He made his debut for the New Zealand sevens team at the 2016 USA Sevens. He scored two tries at the 2016 Canada Sevens in New Zealand's semi-final match against Australia to help them into the finals.

Molia was named as a reserve for the New Zealand sevens team to the 2016 Summer Olympics. After Sonny Bill Williams suffered an injury in their first pool match against Japan, Molia replaced him. He is undertaking an applied maths degree at the University of Auckland.

Molia was part of the All Blacks Sevens squad that won a bronze medal at the 2022 Commonwealth Games in Birmingham. He co-captained the team at the Rugby World Cup Sevens in Cape Town. His side won a silver medal after losing to Fiji in the gold medal final.
