= Jasa Veremalua =

Fijian rugby union player (born 1988)

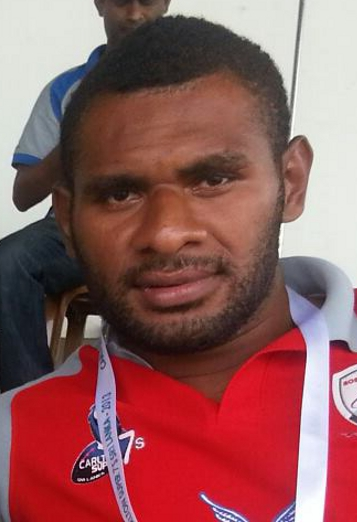
- Born: 29 May 1988 (age 38) Korotogo, Baravi, Nadroga
- Height: 195 cm (6 ft 5 in)
- Weight: 98 kg (15 st 6 lb; 216 lb)
- School: St Thomas Secondary School
- University: Fiji National University

Rugby union career
- Position(s): Wing, Centre, Flanker
- Current team: San Diego Legion
Senior career
Years	Team	Apps	(Points)
2012	Red Rock		
2019-	San Diego Legion	36	(30)
National sevens team
Years	Team		Comps
2013–	Fiji 7s		123
Medal record
Olympic Games
Gold medal – first place	2016 Rio de Janeiro	Team

Jasa Veremalua MOF (born 29 May 1988) is a Fijian rugby union player who plays for the Tel Aviv Heat. He played for the San Diego Legion of Major League Rugby (MLR). He also plays for the Fiji sevens team. Veremalua made his debut for Fiji 7s at the 2013 Wellington Sevens. He is from Korotogo Village in the Nadroga Navosa Province.

== Youth and early career ==
Jasa Veremalua was born and raised in Korotogo, Baravi, Nadroga and he started his career playing rugby in the local 7's competition. He has been playing for the famous Red Rock 7's Team since 2012. His father died in 2005 when he was just 19. He regards his Red Rock coach, Lote Rasiga as a father-figure.

He attended Sigatoka Methodist Primary School then Sigatoka Methodist College and then went on to St Thomas High School in Lautoka. He then attended Fiji National University in Ba to do his Diploma in Automobile and Road Transport studies. He joined Senibiau Rugby Club in Nadroga in 2006 and later joined Natabua Rugby club from 2010–2011.

In 2012, he was named best player won the Campese-Serevi Medal during the Coral Coast 7's.

== National team ==
He was later selected by the then Fiji 7's coach, Alifereti Dere into the 7's team. In March 2013, he was offered a contract by Stade Toulousain to play in the Top 14 competition but due to an injury, the offer was taken back.

In 2016, his performance in the 2016 USA Sevens saw him win the DHL Impact player of the tournament.

He was also instrumental in helping Fiji win their 2nd title in a row after Fiji took out the 2015–16 World Rugby Sevens Series during the 2016 London Sevens by reaching the cup quarterfinals. He was crowned the DHL Impact Player of the 2015‑16 7s series as well as making the Dream Team of the series.
