= 2015 South Africa Sevens =

- Sevens World Series XVII
- Host nation: South Africa
- Date: 12–13 December 2015

Cup
- Champion: South Africa
- Runner-up: Argentina
- Third: France

Plate
- Winner: Fiji
- Runner-up: United States

Bowl
- Winner: Scotland
- Runner-up: England

Shield
- Winner: Samoa
- Runner-up: Russia

Tournament details
- Matches played: 45
- Tries scored: 273 (average 6.07 per match)

The 2015 South Africa Sevens was the second tournament within the 2015–16 World Rugby Sevens Series and the seventeenth edition of the South Africa Sevens. It was held over the weekend of 12-13 December 2015 at Cape Town Stadium in Cape Town, South Africa.

== Format ==
The teams were drawn into four pools of four teams each, with each team playing every other team in their pool once. The top two teams from each pool advanced to the Cup/Plate brackets. The bottom two teams from each group went to the Bowl/Shield brackets.

== Teams ==
The 16 participating teams for the tournament:

- Argentina
- Australia
- Canada
- England
- Fiji
- France
- Kenya
- New Zealand
- Portugal
- Samoa
- Scotland
- South Africa
- Russia
- United States
- Wales
- Zimbabwe

== Pool Stage ==
Key to colours in group tables
Teams that advanced to the Cup quarter-final

=== Pool A ===
Team	Pld	W	D	L	PF	PA	PD	Pts
Fiji	3	3	0	0	129	19	+110	9
Argentina	3	2	0	1	52	62	–10	7
Scotland	3	1	0	2	66	63	+3	5
Russia	3	0	0	3	15	118	–103	3

12 December 2015
10:59

Fiji	34–19	Scotland

Cape Town Stadium, Cape Town

12 December 2015
11:21

Argentina	33–5	Russia

Cape Town Stadium, Cape Town

12 December 2015
14:20

Fiji	52–0	Russia

Cape Town Stadium, Cape Town

12 December 2015
14:42

Argentina	19–14	Scotland

Cape Town Stadium, Cape Town

12 December 2015
17:41

Scotland	33–10	Russia

Cape Town Stadium, Cape Town

12 December 2015
18:03

Fiji	43–0	Argentina

Cape Town Stadium, Cape Town

=== Pool B ===
Team	Pld	W	D	L	PF	PA	PD	Pts
Kenya	3	2	1	0	69	31	+38	8
South Africa	3	2	0	1	48	19	+29	7
England	3	1	1	1	62	29	+33	6
Zimbabwe	3	0	0	3	5	105	–100	3

12 December 2015
12:27

England	19–19	Kenya

Cape Town Stadium, Cape Town

12 December 2015
12:49

South Africa	26–5	Zimbabwe

Cape Town Stadium, Cape Town

12 December 2015
15:48

England	43–0	Zimbabwe

Cape Town Stadium, Cape Town

12 December 2015
16:10

South Africa	12–14	Kenya

Cape Town Stadium, Cape Town

12 December 2015
19:34

Kenya	36–0	Zimbabwe

Cape Town Stadium, Cape Town

12 December 2015
19:56

England	0–10	South Africa

Cape Town Stadium, Cape Town

=== Pool C ===
Team	Pld	W	D	L	PF	PA	PD	Pts
Australia	3	3	0	0	92	35	+57	9
United States	3	2	0	1	99	52	+47	7
Wales	3	1	0	2	73	52	+21	5
Portugal	3	0	0	3	12	137	–125	3

12 December 2015
10:15

United States	26–19	Wales

Cape Town Stadium, Cape Town

12 December 2015
10:37

Australia	45–0	Portugal

Cape Town Stadium, Cape Town

12 December 2015
13:36

United States	52–7	Portugal

Cape Town Stadium, Cape Town

12 December 2015
13:58

Australia	21–14	Wales

Cape Town Stadium, Cape Town

12 December 2015
16:57

Wales	40–5	Portugal

Cape Town Stadium, Cape Town

12 December 2015
17:19

United States	21–26	Australia

Cape Town Stadium, Cape Town

=== Pool D ===
Team	Pld	W	D	L	PF	PA	PD	Pts
New Zealand	3	2	0	1	50	48	+2	7
France	3	1	1	1	62	64	–2	6
Canada	3	1	1	1	60	62	–2	6
Samoa	3	1	0	2	53	51	+2	5

12 December 2015
11:43

New Zealand	19–14	France

Cape Town Stadium, Cape Town

12 December 2015
12:05

Samoa	24–10	Canada

Cape Town Stadium, Cape Town

12 December 2015
15:04

New Zealand	12–24	Canada

Cape Town Stadium, Cape Town

12 December 2015
15:26

Samoa	19–22	France

Cape Town Stadium, Cape Town

12 December 2015
18:50

France	26–26	Canada

Cape Town Stadium, Cape Town

12 December 2015
19:12

New Zealand	19–10	Samoa

Cape Town Stadium, Cape Town

== Knockout stage ==
=== Shield ===
Quarter-finals
13 December 2015 - 10:36 – Cape Town Stadium
Scotland	26
Samoa	14
13 December 2015 - 10:58 – Cape Town Stadium
Wales	21
Zimbabwe	12
13 December 2015 - 11:20 – Cape Town Stadium
Canada	55
Russia	0
13 December 2015 - 11:42 – Cape Town Stadium
England	49
Portugal	7

Semi-finals
13 December 2015 - 13:57 – Cape Town Stadium
Samoa	33
Zimbabwe	0
13 December 2015 - 14:19 – Cape Town Stadium
Russia	38
Portugal	5

Final
13 December 2015 - 17:43 – Cape Town Stadium
Samoa	40
Russia	5

=== Bowl ===
Quarter-finals
13 December 2015 - 10:36 – Cape Town Stadium
Scotland	26
Samoa	14
13 December 2015 - 10:58 – Cape Town Stadium
Wales	21
Zimbabwe	12
13 December 2015 - 11:20 – Cape Town Stadium
Canada	55
Russia	0
13 December 2015 - 11:42 – Cape Town Stadium
England	49
Portugal	7

Semi-finals
13 December 2015 - 14:41 – Cape Town Stadium
Scotland	29
Wales	14
13 December 2015 - 15:03 – Cape Town Stadium
Canada	14
England	21

Final
13 December 2015 - 18:08 – Cape Town Stadium
Scotland	19
England	0

=== Plate ===
Quarter-finals
13 December 2015 - 12:04 – Cape Town Stadium
Fiji	14
France	17
13 December 2015 - 12:26 – Cape Town Stadium
Australia	5
South Africa	25
13 December 2015 - 12:48 – Cape Town Stadium
New Zealand	19
Argentina	22
13 December 2015 - 13:10 – Cape Town Stadium
Kenya	26
United States	10

Semi-finals
13 December 2015 - 15:50 – Cape Town Stadium
Fiji	38
Australia	19
13 December 2015 - 16:12 – Cape Town Stadium
New Zealand	14
United States	28

Final
13 December 2015 - 18:33 – Cape Town Stadium
Fiji	29
United States	19

=== Cup ===
Quarter-finals
13 December 2015 - 12:04 – Cape Town Stadium
Fiji	14
France	17
13 December 2015 - 12:26 – Cape Town Stadium
Australia	5
South Africa	25
13 December 2015 - 12:48 – Cape Town Stadium
New Zealand	19
Argentina	22
13 December 2015 - 13:10 – Cape Town Stadium
Kenya	26
United States	10

Semi-finals
13 December 2015 - 16:34 – Cape Town Stadium
France	12
South Africa	21
13 December 2015 - 16:56 – Cape Town Stadium
Argentina	24
Kenya	22

Final
13 December 2015 - 19:30 – Cape Town Stadium
South Africa	29
Argentina	14
Third place
13 December 2015 – 18:58 - Cape Town Stadium
France	28
Kenya	26
