= Fa'alemiga Selesele =

- Born: February 28, 1989 (age 37)
- Height: 1.81 m (5 ft 11 1/2 in)
- Weight: 102 kg (225 lb; 16 st 1 lb)

Rugby union career
International career
| Years | Team | Apps | (Points) |
| 2010-2014 | Samoa | 5 | |
National sevens team
| Years | Team | | Comps |
- Samoa

Fa’alemiga Selesele (born February 28, 1989) is a Samoan rugby union player. Selesele represents Samoa internationally in rugby sevens and is the current captain. He has appeared in 139 matches for Samoa and scored 255 points.

Selesele was part of the squad that defeated New Zealand 7s 26-15 in the finals of the 2012 Dubai Sevens. He also led Samoa to win the 2016 Paris Sevens beating Fiji in the Cup final. He was voted into the 2016 Hong Kong Sevens Dream Team.
