= 2015 Dubai Sevens =

World Rugby Sevens Series tournament

- Sevens World Series XVII
- Host nation: United Arab Emirates
- Date: 4–5 December 2015

Cup
- Champion: Fiji
- Runner-up: England
- Third: United States

Plate
- Winner: South Africa
- Runner-up: Australia

Bowl
- Winner: France
- Runner-up: Scotland

Shield
- Winner: Canada
- Runner-up: Japan

Tournament details
- Matches played: 45
- Tries scored: 264 (average 5.87 per match)

The 2015 Dubai Sevens was the first tournament within the 2015–16 World Rugby Sevens Series. It was held over the weekend of 4–5 December 2015 at The Sevens Stadium in Dubai, United Arab Emirates.

== Format ==
The teams were drawn into four pools of four teams each. Each team played the other three teams in their pool once. The top two teams from each pool advance to the Cup/Plate brackets. The bottom two teams from each group go to the Bowl/Shield brackets.

== Teams ==
The 16 participating teams for the tournament:

- Argentina
- Australia
- Canada
- England
- Fiji
- France
- Japan
- Kenya
- New Zealand
- Portugal
- Samoa
- Scotland
- South Africa
- Russia
- United States
- Wales

== Pool stage ==
Key to colours in group tables
Teams that advanced to the Cup quarter-final

=== Pool A ===
Team	Pld	W	D	L	PF	PA	PD	Pts
Fiji	3	3	0	0	112	31	+81	9
Argentina	3	2	0	1	50	61	–11	7
Japan	3	1	0	2	57	59	–2	5
Canada	3	0	0	3	35	103	–68	3

4 December 2015
09:00

Fiji	63–14	Canada

The Sevens, Dubai

4 December 2015
09:22

Argentina	31–19	Japan

The Sevens, Dubai

4 December 2015
12:00

Fiji	21–17	Japan

The Sevens, Dubai

4 December 2015
12:22

Argentina	19–14	Canada

The Sevens, Dubai

4 December 2015
18:28

Fiji	28–0	Argentina

The Sevens, Dubai

4 December 2015
18:50

Canada	7–21	Japan

The Sevens, Dubai

=== Pool B ===
Team	Pld	W	D	L	PF	PA	PD	Pts
South Africa	3	3	0	0	104	19	+85	9
Samoa	3	2	0	1	43	55	–12	7
Scotland	3	1	0	2	41	57	–16	5
Russia	3	0	0	3	24	81	–57	3

4 December 2015
09:44

South Africa	33–7	Samoa

The Sevens, Dubai

4 December 2015
10:06

Scotland	17–14	Russia

The Sevens, Dubai

4 December 2015
12:44

South Africa	45–0	Russia

The Sevens, Dubai

4 December 2015
12:44

Scotland	12–17	Samoa

The Sevens, Dubai

4 December 2015
19:12

Samoa	19–10	Russia

The Sevens, Dubai

4 December 2015
19:36

South Africa	26–12	Scotland

The Sevens, Dubai

=== Pool C ===
Team	Pld	W	D	L	PF	PA	PD	Pts
New Zealand	3	2	0	1	80	33	+47	7
United States	3	2	0	1	80	52	+28	7
France	3	2	0	1	75	49	+26	7
Portugal	3	0	0	3	26	127	–101	3

4 December 2015
10:30

New Zealand	21–14	France

The Sevens, Dubai

4 December 2015
10:52

United States	45–14	Portugal

The Sevens, Dubai

4 December 2015
14:14

New Zealand	47–5	Portugal

The Sevens, Dubai

4 December 2015
14:36

United States	21–26	France

The Sevens, Dubai

4 December 2015
19:36

France	35–7	Portugal

The Sevens, Dubai

4 December 2015
19:58

New Zealand	12–14	United States

The Sevens, Dubai

=== Pool D ===
Team	Pld	W	D	L	PF	PA	PD	Pts
England	3	3	0	0	66	22	+44	9
Australia	3	2	0	1	62	33	+29	7
Wales	3	1	0	2	17	79	–62	5
Kenya	3	0	0	3	34	45	–11	3

4 December 2015
11:14

England	26–5	Wales

The Sevens, Dubai

4 December 2015
11:36

Australia	14–12	Kenya

The Sevens, Dubai

4 December 2015
14:58

England	19–12	Kenya

The Sevens, Dubai

4 December 2015
15:20

Australia	43–0	Wales

The Sevens, Dubai

4 December 2015
20:20

Wales	12–10	Kenya

The Sevens, Dubai

4 December 2015
20:42

England	21–5	Australia

The Sevens, Dubai

== Knockout stage ==
=== Shield ===
Quarter-finals
5 December 2015 – 09:30 – The Sevens, Dubai
Japan	12
Kenya	17
5 December 2015 – 09:52 – The Sevens, Dubai
France	38
Russia	5
5 December 2015 – 10:14 – The Sevens, Dubai
Wales	24
Canada	14
5 December 2015 – 10:36 – The Sevens, Dubai
Scotland	21
Portugal	14

Semi-finals
5 December 2015 – 13:38 – The Sevens, Dubai
Japan	21
Russia	19
5 December 2015 – 14:00 – The Sevens, Dubai
Canada	31
Portugal	14

Final
5 December 2015 – 18:14 – The Sevens, Dubai
Japan	17
Canada	19

=== Bowl ===
Quarter-finals
5 December 2015 – 09:30 – The Sevens, Dubai
Japan	12
Kenya	17
5 December 2015 – 09:52 – The Sevens, Dubai
France	38
Russia	5
5 December 2015 – 10:14 – The Sevens, Dubai
Wales	24
Canada	14
5 December 2015 – 10:36 – The Sevens, Dubai
Scotland	21
Portugal	14

Semi-finals
5 December 2015 – 14:22 – The Sevens, Dubai
Kenya	7
France	33
5 December 2015 – 14:44 – The Sevens, Dubai
Wales	14
Scotland	17

Final
5 December 2015 – 18:42 – The Sevens, Dubai
France	24
Scotland	14

=== Plate ===
Quarter-finals
5 December 2015 – 11:00 – The Sevens, Dubai
Fiji	19
Australia	12
5 December 2015 – 11:22 – The Sevens, Dubai
New Zealand	24
Samoa	21
5 December 2015 – 11:44 – The Sevens, Dubai
England	14
Argentina	7
5 December 2015 – 12:06 – The Sevens, Dubai
South Africa	19
United States	21

Semi-finals
5 December 2015 – 16:11 – The Sevens, Dubai
Australia	28
Samoa	10
5 December 2015 – 16:33 – The Sevens, Dubai
Argentina	5
South Africa	26

Final
5 December 2015 – 19:10 – The Sevens, Dubai
Australia	14
South Africa	19

=== Cup ===
Quarter-finals
5 December 2015 – 11:00 – The Sevens, Dubai
Fiji	19
Australia	12
5 December 2015 – 11:22 – The Sevens, Dubai
New Zealand	24
Samoa	21
5 December 2015 – 11:44 – The Sevens, Dubai
England	14
Argentina	7
5 December 2015 – 12:06 – The Sevens, Dubai
South Africa	19
United States	21

Semi-finals
5 December 2015 – 16:55 – The Sevens, Dubai
Fiji	19
New Zealand	5
5 December 2015 – 17:17 – The Sevens, Dubai
England	24
United States	19

Final
5 December 2015 – 20:12 – The Sevens, Dubai
Fiji	28
England	17
Third place
5 December 2015 – 19:40 – The Sevens, Dubai
New Zealand	12
United States	31

== Scoring ==
Rank	Player	Tries
1	(France) Terry Bourahoua	8
2	(South Africa) Seabelo Senatla	7
3	(United States) Perry Baker	5
3	(Fiji) Jerry Tuwai	5
3	(South Africa) Justin Geduld	5
3	(Russia) Vladimir Ostroushko	5

Source: WR website

== Awards ==
- HSBC Player of the Final - Jerry Tuwai
