= 2016 Wellington Sevens =

International rugby union tournament in New Zealand

- Sevens World Series XVII
- Host nation: New Zealand
- Date: 30–31 January 2016

Cup
- Champion: New Zealand
- Runner-up: South Africa
- Third: Fiji

Plate
- Winner: Australia
- Runner-up: Argentina

Bowl
- Winner: Samoa
- Runner-up: Scotland

Shield
- Winner: France
- Runner-up: Russia

Tournament details
- Matches played: 45

The 2016 Wellington Sevens was the third tournament within the 2015–16 World Rugby Sevens Series and the seventeenth edition of the Wellington Sevens. It was held over the weekend 30–31 January 2016 at Westpac Stadium in Wellington, New Zealand.

== Format ==
The teams were drawn into four pools of four teams each. Each team plays every other team in their pool once. The top two teams from each pool advanced to the Cup/Plate brackets. The bottom two teams from each group went to the Bowl/Shield brackets.

== Teams ==
The 16 participating teams for the tournament:

- Argentina
- Australia
- Canada
- England
- Fiji
- France
- Japan
- Kenya
- New Zealand
- Portugal
- Samoa
- Scotland
- South Africa
- Russia
- United States
- Wales

== Squads ==
Final squads were announced on 28 January 2016. The most notable announced addition was the debut of 2015 Rugby World Cup winner Sonny Bill Williams for New Zealand.

== Pool Stage ==
Key to colours in group tables
| Teams that advanced to the Cup Quarterfinal |

=== Pool A ===
| Team | Pld | W | D | L | PF | PA | PD | Pts |
|---|---|---|---|---|---|---|---|---|
| New Zealand | 3 | 3 | 0 | 0 | 84 | 28 | +56 | 9 |
| South Africa | 3 | 2 | 0 | 1 | 96 | 24 | +72 | 7 |
| Scotland | 3 | 1 | 0 | 2 | 31 | 72 | –41 | 5 |
| Russia | 3 | 0 | 0 | 3 | 24 | 111 | –87 | 3 |

30 January 2016
13:42

| South Africa | 28–5 | Scotland |
| | Report |

Westpac Stadium, Wellington

30 January 2016
14:04

| New Zealand | 38–7 | Russia |
| | Report |

Westpac Stadium, Wellington

30 January 2016
16:44

| South Africa | 54–0 | Russia |
| | Report |

Westpac Stadium, Wellington

30 January 2016
17:06

| New Zealand | 27–7 | Scotland |
| | Report |

Westpac Stadium, Wellington

30 January 2016
20:04

| Scotland | 19–17 | Russia |
| | Report |

Westpac Stadium, Wellington

30 January 2016
20:30

| South Africa | 14–19 | New Zealand |
| | Report |

Westpac Stadium, Wellington

=== Pool B ===
| Team | Pld | W | D | L | PF | PA | PD | Pts |
|---|---|---|---|---|---|---|---|---|
| Fiji | 3 | 3 | 0 | 0 | 109 | 24 | +85 | 9 |
| Argentina | 3 | 2 | 0 | 1 | 60 | 57 | +3 | 7 |
| Wales | 3 | 1 | 0 | 2 | 52 | 80 | –28 | 5 |
| Japan | 3 | 0 | 0 | 3 | 49 | 109 | –60 | 3 |

30 January 2016
12:14

| Argentina | 19–12 | Wales |
| | Report |

Westpac Stadium, Wellington

30 January 2016
12:36

| Fiji | 45–7 | Japan |
| | Report |

Westpac Stadium, Wellington

30 January 2016
15:16

| Argentina | 31–14 | Japan |
| | Report |

Westpac Stadium, Wellington

30 January 2016
15:38

| Fiji | 33–7 | Wales |
| | Report |

Westpac Stadium, Wellington

30 January 2016
18:20

| Wales | 33–28 | Japan |
| | Report |

Westpac Stadium, Wellington

30 January 2016
18:46

| Argentina | 10–31 | Fiji |
| | Report |

Westpac Stadium, Wellington

=== Pool C ===
| Team | Pld | W | D | L | PF | PA | PD | Pts |
|---|---|---|---|---|---|---|---|---|
| England | 3 | 2 | 0 | 1 | 50 | 36 | +14 | 7 |
| United States | 3 | 2 | 0 | 1 | 58 | 60 | –2 | 7 |
| France | 3 | 1 | 0 | 2 | 63 | 58 | +5 | 5 |
| Samoa | 3 | 1 | 0 | 2 | 49 | 66 | –17 | 5 |

30 January 2016
11:30

| France | 14–17 | England |
| | Report |

Westpac Stadium, Wellington

30 January 2016
11:52

| United States | 24–20 | Samoa |
| | Report |

Westpac Stadium, Wellington

30 January 2016
14:32

| France | 28–12 | Samoa |
| | Report |

Westpac Stadium, Wellington

30 January 2016
14:54

| United States | 5–19 | England |
| | Report |

Westpac Stadium, Wellington

30 January 2016
17:28

| England | 14–17 | Samoa |
| | Report |

Westpac Stadium, Wellington

30 January 2016
17:54

| France | 21–29 | United States |
| | Report |

Westpac Stadium, Wellington

=== Pool D ===
| Team | Pld | W | D | L | PF | PA | PD | Pts |
|---|---|---|---|---|---|---|---|---|
| Australia | 3 | 3 | 0 | 0 | 62 | 46 | +16 | 9 |
| Kenya | 3 | 2 | 0 | 1 | 69 | 29 | +40 | 7 |
| Canada | 3 | 1 | 0 | 2 | 71 | 64 | +7 | 5 |
| Portugal | 3 | 0 | 0 | 3 | 24 | 87 | –63 | 3 |

30 January 2016
12:58

| Kenya | 31–7 | Canada |
| | Report |

Westpac Stadium, Wellington

30 January 2016
13:20

| Australia | 19–12 | Portugal |
| | Report |

Westpac Stadium, Wellington

30 January 2016
16:00

| Kenya | 26–5 | Portugal |
| | Report |

Westpac Stadium, Wellington

30 January 2016
16:22

| Australia | 26–22 | Canada |
| | Report |

Westpac Stadium, Wellington

30 January 2016
19:12

| Canada | 42–7 | Portugal |
| | Report |

Westpac Stadium, Wellington

30 January 2016
19:38

| Kenya | 12–17 | Australia |
| | Report |

Westpac Stadium, Wellington

== Knockout stage ==
=== Shield ===
Quarter-finals
31 January 2016 – 11:30 – Westpac Stadium
Scotland | 29
Portugal | 12
31 January 2016 – 11:52 – Westpac Stadium
France | 14
Japan | 19
31 January 2016 – 12:14 – Westpac Stadium
Canada | 35
Russia | 12
31 January 2016 – 12:36 – Westpac Stadium
Wales | 24
Samoa | 29

Semi-finals
31 January 2016 – 14:40 – Westpac Stadium
Portugal | 17
France | 22
31 January 2016 – 15:02 – Westpac Stadium
Russia | 17
Wales | 0

Final
31 January 2016 – 18:30 – Westpac Stadium
France | 14
Russia | 7

=== Bowl ===
Quarter-finals
31 January 2016 – 11:30 – Westpac Stadium
Scotland | 29
Portugal | 12
31 January 2016 – 11:52 – Westpac Stadium
France | 14
Japan | 19
31 January 2016 – 12:14 – Westpac Stadium
Canada | 35
Russia | 12
31 January 2016 – 12:36 – Westpac Stadium
Wales | 24
Samoa | 29

Semi-finals
31 January 2016 – 15:24 – Westpac Stadium
Scotland | 31
Japan | 26
31 January 2016 – 15:46 – Westpac Stadium
Canada | 7
Samoa | 26

Final
31 January 2016 – 19:00 – Westpac Stadium
Scotland | 7
Samoa | 19

=== Plate ===
Quarter-finals
31 January 2016 – 13:02 – Westpac Stadium
New Zealand | 36
Kenya | 0
31 January 2016 – 13:24 – Westpac Stadium
England | 33
Argentina | 7
31 January 2016 – 13:46 – Westpac Stadium
Australia | 14
South Africa | 26
31 January 2016 – 14:08 – Westpac Stadium
Fiji | 21
United States | 12

Semi-finals
31 January 2016 – 16:08 – Westpac Stadium
Kenya | 14
Argentina | 35
31 January 2016 – 16:30 – Westpac Stadium
Australia | 17
United States | 5

Final
31 January 2016 – 19:30 – Westpac Stadium
Argentina | 5
Australia | 21

Cup

Quarter-finals
31 January 2016 - 13:02 – Westpac Stadium
New Zealand | 36
Kenya | 0
31 January 2016 – 13:24 – Westpac Stadium
England | 33
Argentina | 7
31 January 2016 – 13:46 – Westpac Stadium
Australia | 14
South Africa | 26
31 January 2016 – 14:08 – Westpac Stadium
Fiji | 21
United States | 12

Semi-finals
31 January 2016 – 17:27 – Westpac Stadium
New Zealand | 25
England | 5
31 January 2016 – 17:52 – Westpac Stadium
South Africa | 31
Fiji | 0

Final
31 January 2016 – 20:30 – Westpac Stadium
New Zealand | 24
South Africa | 21
Third place
31 January 2016 – 20:00 – Westpac Stadium
England | 12
Fiji | 24

== Cup final ==
The Cup final of the 2016 Wellington Sevens was contested by New Zealand and South Africa, after they won their semi-final matches against England and Fiji respectively. It was the second time the two teams met in the tournament, after New Zealand won their Pool A match 19–14 the previous day.

New Zealand's Sonny Bill Williams dropped the ball from the kick-off, immediately giving possession straight back to South Africa. They led 7–0 with a converted try to Philip Snyman after three minutes, which was soon increased to 14–0 after Rosko Specman scored from a five meter scrum. Cheslin Kolbe converted both tries. Akira Ioane scored a try for New Zealand 30 seconds before half-time, which Kurt Baker converted, making the scoreline 14-7 at the break.

Specman almost scored a second try before a wayward Williams pass allowed Seabelo Senatla to extend South Africa's lead to 21-7 halfway through the second half. With less than four minutes remaining, Specman was sent to the sin bin following a professional foul, with South Africa reduced to six men. Rieko Ioane scored two tries with Baker converted one, reducing South Africa's lead to 21–19. Despite Specman returning to the field and the full-time hooter sounding, New Zealand completed their come-from-behind victory, with Joe Webber scoring a try in injury time to secure a 24–21 victory for the hosts, ensuring New Zealand won their home tournament for the third year in succession.

Australian referee Matt O'Brien officiated the final, but received criticism for his handling of the match, with a number of decisions in the latter stages of the match being given in New Zealand's favour and South Africa's coach Neil Powell later said that he would seek clarification from the officials. New Zealand sports reporter Mark Reason described the officiating as "an embarrassment".

Despite the loss, South Africa moved to the top of the 2015–16 World Rugby Sevens Series log, two points ahead of second-placed Fiji.
