= 2016 London Sevens =

- Sevens World Series XVII
- Host nation: England
- Date: 21–22 May 2016

Cup
- Champion: Scotland
- Runner-up: South Africa
- Third: United States

Plate
- Winner: New Zealand
- Runner-up: Argentina

Bowl
- Winner: Wales
- Runner-up: Australia

Shield
- Winner: Kenya
- Runner-up: Russia

Tournament details
- Matches played: 45

The 2016 London Sevens was the tenth and final tournament within the 2015–16 World Rugby Sevens Series. This edition of the London Sevens was held over the weekend of 21–22 May 2016 at Twickenham in London.

Scotland won its first ever World Rugby Sevens Series title.

== Format ==
The teams were drawn into four pools of four teams each. Each team plays all the others in their pool once. The top two teams from each pool advance to the Cup/Plate brackets. The bottom two teams go into the Bowl/Shield brackets.

== Teams ==
The pools and schedule were announced in April 2016.

- Argentina
- Australia
- Brazil
- Canada
- England
- Fiji
- France
- Kenya
- New Zealand
- Portugal
- Russia
- South Africa
- Samoa
- Scotland
- United States
- Wales

== Pool Stage ==
Key to colours in group tables
Teams that advanced to the Cup Quarterfinal

=== Pool A ===
Teams	Pld	W	D	L	PF	PA	+/−	Pts
South Africa	3	3	0	0	57	17	+40	9
United States	3	1	1	1	34	31	+3	6
Canada	3	1	1	1	43	52	-9	6
Samoa	3	0	0	3	24	58	-34	3

21 May 2016
10:14

Samoa	5–12	United States

Twickenham

21 May 2016
10:36

South Africa	21–7	Canada

Twickenham

21 May 2016
13:20

Samoa	19–24	Canada

Twickenham

21 May 2016
13:42

South Africa	14–10	United States

Twickenham

21 May 2016
16:26

United States	12–12	Canada

Twickenham

21 May 2016
16:48

Samoa	0–22	South Africa

Twickenham

=== Pool B ===
Teams	Pld	W	D	L	PF	PA	+/−	Pts
England	3	3	0	0	65	22	+43	9
Fiji	3	2	0	1	78	36	+42	7
Australia	3	1	0	2	29	46	-17	5
Wales	3	0	0	3	20	88	-68	3

21 May 2016
11:42

Australia	22–10	Wales

Twickenham

21 May 2016
12:04

Fiji	10–31	England

Twickenham

21 May 2016
14:48

Fiji	42–5	Wales

Twickenham

21 May 2016
15:10

Australia	7–10	England

Twickenham

21 May 2016
17:54

Fiji	26–0	Australia

Twickenham

21 May 2016
18:16

England	24–5	Wales

Twickenham

=== Pool C ===
Teams	Pld	W	D	L	PF	PA	+/−	Pts
France	3	2	1	0	88	40	+48	8
Scotland	3	2	1	0	69	40	+29	8
Kenya	3	1	0	2	46	70	-24	5
Portugal	3	0	0	3	45	98	-53	3

21 May 2016
09:30

France	14–14	Scotland

Twickenham

21 May 2016
09:52

Kenya	22–17	Portugal

Twickenham

21 May 2016
12:36

France	45–14	Portugal

Twickenham

21 May 2016
12:58

Kenya	12–24	Scotland

Twickenham

21 May 2016
15:42

Scotland	31–14	Portugal

Twickenham

21 May 2016
16:04

France	29–12	Kenya

Twickenham

=== Pool D ===
Teams	Pld	W	D	L	PF	PA	+/−	Pts
New Zealand	3	2	1	0	78	24	+54	8
Argentina	3	2	1	0	64	33	+31	8
Russia	3	1	0	2	36	60	-24	5
Brazil	3	0	0	3	12	73	-61	3

21 May 2016
10:58

Argentina	22–12	Russia

Twickenham

21 May 2016
11:20

New Zealand	31–0	Brazil

Twickenham

21 May 2016
14:04

Argentina	28–7	Brazil

Twickenham

21 May 2016
14:26

New Zealand	33–10	Russia

Twickenham

21 May 2016
17:10

Russia	14–5	Brazil

Twickenham

21 May 2016
17:32

Argentina	14–14	New Zealand

Twickenham

== Knockout stage ==
=== Shield ===
Quarter-finals
22 May 2016 – 09:30 – Twickenham, London
Canada	19
Brazil	7
22 May 2016 – 09:52 – Twickenham, London
Kenya	19
Wales	21
22 May 2016 – 10:14 – Twickenham, London
Russia	17
Samoa	22
22 May 2016 – 10:36 – Twickenham, London
Australia	17
Portugal	12

Semi-finals
22 May 2016 – 12:36 – Twickenham, London
Brazil	5
Kenya	38
22 May 2016 – 12:58 – Twickenham, London
Russia	26
Portugal	7

Final
22 May 2016 – 16:02 – Twickenham, London
Kenya	31
Russia	7

=== Bowl ===
Quarter-finals
22 May 2016 – 09:30 – Twickenham, London
Canada	19
Brazil	7
22 May 2016 – 09:52 – Twickenham, London
Kenya	19
Wales	21
22 May 2016 – 10:14 – Twickenham, London
Russia	17
Samoa	22
22 May 2016 – 10:36 – Twickenham, London
Australia	17
Portugal	12

Semi-finals
22 May 2016 – 13:20 – Twickenham, London
Canada	17
Wales	21
22 May 2016 – 13:42 – Twickenham, London
Samoa	21
Australia	22

Final
22 May 2016 – 16:32 – Twickenham, London
Wales	24
Australia	19

=== Plate ===
Quarter-finals
22 May 2016 – 10:58 – Twickenham, London
South Africa	21
Argentina	19
22 May 2016 – 11:20 – Twickenham, London
France	7
Fiji	40
22 May 2016 – 11:42 – Twickenham, London
New Zealand	14
United States	42
22 May 2016 – 12:04 – Twickenham, London
England	0
Scotland	17

Semi-finals
22 May 2016 – 14:04 – Twickenham, London
Argentina	31
France	5
22 May 2016 – 14:26 – Twickenham, London
New Zealand	35
England	10

Final
22 May 2016 – 17:02 – Twickenham, London
Argentina	14
New Zealand	29

=== Cup ===
Quarter-finals
22 May 2016 – 10:58 – Twickenham, London
South Africa	21
Argentina	19
22 May 2016 – 11:20 – Twickenham, London
France	7
Fiji	40
22 May 2016 – 11:42 – Twickenham, London
New Zealand	14
United States	42
22 May 2016 – 12:04 – Twickenham, London
England	0
Scotland	17

Semi-finals
22 May 2016 – 14:48 – Twickenham, London
South Africa	26
Fiji	21
22 May 2016 – 15:10 – Twickenham, London
United States	17
Scotland	24

Final
22 May 2016 – 17:57 – Twickenham, London
South Africa	26
Scotland	27
Third place
22 May 2016 – 17:32 – Twickenham, London
Fiji	19
United States	26
