= 2016 Paris Sevens =

- Sevens World Series XVII
- Host nation: France
- Date: 13–15 May 2016

Cup
- Champion: Samoa
- Runner-up: Fiji
- Third: France

Plate
- Winner: South Africa
- Runner-up: Australia

Bowl
- Winner: Scotland
- Runner-up: England

Shield
- Winner: Portugal
- Runner-up: Wales

Tournament details
- Matches played: 45

The 2016 Paris Sevens was the ninth tournament of the 2015–16 World Rugby Sevens Series. The tournament was played on 13–15 May 2016 at Stade Jean Bouin in Paris, France. It was the first time that the France Sevens had been featured on the Sevens world circuit since 2006.

== Format ==
Sixteen teams are drawn into four pools of four teams each. Each team plays each of the other teams their pool once. The top two teams from each pool advance to the Cup/Plate brackets. The bottom two teams from each group go to the Bowl/Shield brackets.

== Teams ==
The 16 participating teams for the tournament:

- Argentina
- Australia
- Brazil
- Canada
- England
- Fiji
- France
- Kenya
- New Zealand
- Portugal
- Samoa
- Scotland
- South Africa
- Russia
- United States
- Wales

== Pool stages ==
=== Pool A ===
Team	Pld	W	D	L	PF	PA	PD	Pts
New Zealand	3	3	0	0	85	27	+58	9
Kenya	3	2	0	1	68	40	+28	7
Russia	3	1	0	2	34	67	−33	5
Portugal	3	0	0	3	24	77	−53	3

13 May 2016
19:00

Kenya	29–14	Portugal

Stade Jean-Bouin, Paris

13 May 2016
19:22

New Zealand	35–10	Russia

Stade Jean-Bouin, Paris

14 May 2016
10:30

Kenya	22–7	Russia

Stade Jean-Bouin, Paris

14 May 2016
10:52

New Zealand	31–0	Portugal

Stade Jean-Bouin, Paris

14 May 2016
13:41

Portugal	10–17	Russia

Stade Jean-Bouin, Paris

14 May 2016
14:03

Kenya	17–19	New Zealand

Stade Jean-Bouin, Paris

=== Pool B ===
Team	Pld	W	D	L	PF	PA	PD	Pts
Fiji	3	3	0	0	113	31	+82	9
Samoa	3	2	0	1	74	64	+10	7
Scotland	3	1	0	2	59	62	−3	5
Wales	3	0	0	3	31	120	−89	3

13 May 2016
19:44

Fiji	38–12	Scotland

Stade Jean-Bouin, Paris

13 May 2016
20:06

Samoa	52–10	Wales

Stade Jean-Bouin, Paris

14 May 2016
11:14

Fiji	33–14	Wales

Stade Jean-Bouin, Paris

14 May 2016
11:36

Samoa	17–12	Scotland

Stade Jean-Bouin, Paris

14 May 2016
14:25

Scotland	35–7	Wales

Stade Jean-Bouin, Paris

14 May 2016
14:47

Fiji	42–5	Samoa

Stade Jean-Bouin, Paris

=== Pool C ===
Team	Pld	W	D	L	PF	PA	PD	Pts
South Africa	3	3	0	0	85	12	+73	9
Australia	3	2	0	1	62	50	+12	7
England	3	1	0	2	62	60	+2	5
Brazil	3	0	0	3	19	106	−87	3

13 May 2016
21:12

South Africa	24–5	England

Stade Jean-Bouin, Paris

13 May 2016
21:34

Australia	38–0	Brazil

Stade Jean-Bouin, Paris

14 May 2016
12:42

South Africa	30–7	Brazil

Stade Jean-Bouin, Paris

14 May 2016
13:04

Australia	24–19	England

Stade Jean-Bouin, Paris

14 May 2016
15:53

England	38–12	Brazil

Stade Jean-Bouin, Paris

14 May 2016
16:15

South Africa	31–0	Australia

Stade Jean-Bouin, Paris

=== Pool D ===
Team	Pld	W	D	L	PF	PA	PD	Pts
France	3	3	0	0	92	31	+61	9
Argentina	3	2	0	1	78	33	+45	7
United States	3	1	0	2	45	72	−27	5
Canada	3	0	0	3	24	103	−79	3

13 May 2016
20:28

Argentina	36–0	United States

Stade Jean-Bouin, Paris

13 May 2016
20:50

France	42–5	Canada

Stade Jean-Bouin, Paris

14 May 2016
11:58

Argentina	28–7	Canada

Stade Jean-Bouin, Paris

14 May 2016
12:20

France	24–12	United States

Stade Jean-Bouin, Paris

14 May 2016
15:09

United States	33–12	Canada

Stade Jean-Bouin, Paris

14 May 2016
15:31

Argentina	14–26	France

Stade Jean-Bouin, Paris

== Knockout stage ==
=== Shield ===
Quarter-finals
15 May 2016 – – Stade Jean-Bouin, Paris
Russia	33
Canada	0
15 May 2016 – – Stade Jean-Bouin, Paris
England	17
Wales	12
15 May 2016 – – Stade Jean-Bouin, Paris
United States	19
Portugal	17
15 May 2016 – – Stade Jean-Bouin, Paris
Scotland	38
Brazil	14

Semi-finals
15 May 2016 – – Stade Jean-Bouin, Paris
Canada	12
Wales	17
15 May 2016 – – Stade Jean-Bouin, Paris
Portugal	24
Brazil	5

Final
15 May 2016 – – Stade Jean-Bouin, Paris
Wales	19
Portugal	24

=== Bowl ===
Quarter-finals
15 May 2016 – – Stade Jean-Bouin, Paris
Russia	33
Canada	0
15 May 2016 – – Stade Jean-Bouin, Paris
England	17
Wales	12
15 May 2016 – – Stade Jean-Bouin, Paris
United States	19
Portugal	17
15 May 2016 – – Stade Jean-Bouin, Paris
Scotland	38
Brazil	14

Semi-finals
15 May 2016 – – Stade Jean-Bouin, Paris
Russia	7
England	19
15 May 2016 – – Stade Jean-Bouin, Paris
United States	12
Scotland	14

Final
15 May 2016 – – Stade Jean-Bouin, Paris
England	10
Scotland	28

=== Plate ===
Quarter-finals
15 May 2016 – – Stade Jean-Bouin, Paris
New Zealand	17
Argentina	19
15 May 2016 – – Stade Jean-Bouin, Paris
South Africa	10
Samoa	21
15 May 2016 – – Stade Jean-Bouin, Paris
France	24
Kenya	5
15 May 2016 – – Stade Jean-Bouin, Paris
Fiji	17
Australia	15

Semi-finals
15 May 2016 – – Stade Jean-Bouin, Paris
New Zealand	19
South Africa	29
15 May 2016 – – Stade Jean-Bouin, Paris
Kenya	7
Australia	26

Final
15 May 2016 – – Stade Jean-Bouin, Paris
South Africa	17
Australia	7

=== Cup ===
Quarter-finals
15 May 2016 – – Stade Jean-Bouin, Paris
New Zealand	17
Argentina	19
15 May 2016 – – Stade Jean-Bouin, Paris
South Africa	10
Samoa	21
15 May 2016 – – Stade Jean-Bouin, Paris
France	24
Kenya	5
15 May 2016 – – Stade Jean-Bouin, Paris
Fiji	17
Australia	15

Semi-finals
15 May 2016 – – Stade Jean-Bouin, Paris
Argentina	12
Samoa	14
15 May 2016 – – Stade Jean-Bouin, Paris
France	5
Fiji	22

Final
15 May 2016 – – Stade Jean-Bouin, Paris
Samoa	29
Fiji	26
Third place
15 May 2016 – – Stade Jean-Bouin, Paris
Argentina	10
France	26
