= 2016 Sydney Sevens =

- Sevens World Series XVII
- Host nation: Australia
- Date: 6–7 February 2016

Cup
- Champion: New Zealand
- Runner-up: Australia
- Third: Fiji

Plate
- Winner: Argentina
- Runner-up: Kenya

Bowl
- Winner: Canada
- Runner-up: Samoa

Shield
- Winner: Wales
- Runner-up: Russia

Tournament details
- Matches played: 45

The 2016 Sydney Sevens was the fourth tournament of the 2015–16 World Rugby Sevens Series, held over the weekend of 6–7 February 2016 at Sydney Football Stadium in Sydney, Australia. It was the thirteenth edition of the Australian Sevens tournament.

The Cup final was won by New Zealand, defeating Australia by 27–24 in front of a sold-out crowd of over 37,000 fans. Fiji defeated South Africa in the third place play-off.

== Format ==
The teams were divided into pools of four teams each, and a round-robin played within each pool. Points were awarded for each match as 3 for a win, 2 for a draw, 1 for a loss. The top two teams from each pool advanced to the play-offs for the Cup and Plate. The bottom two teams in each pool progressed to the play-offs for the Bowl and Shield

== Teams ==
The sixteen participating teams for the tournament were:

- Argentina
- Australia
- Canada
- England
- Fiji
- France
- Japan
- Kenya
- New Zealand
- Portugal
- Samoa
- Scotland
- South Africa
- Russia
- United States
- Wales

== Pool Stage ==
Key to colours in group tables
Teams that advanced to the Cup Quarterfinal

=== Pool A ===
Team	Pld	W	D	L	PF	PA	PD	Pts
New Zealand	3	2	1	0	84	34	+50	8
Australia	3	2	1	0	67	36	+31	8
Portugal	3	1	0	2	38	81	-43	5
Canada	3	0	0	3	41	79	-38	3

6 February 2016
13:12

New Zealand	27–12	Canada

Sydney Football Stadium, Sydney

6 February 2016
13:34

Australia	24–7	Portugal

Sydney Football Stadium, Sydney

6 February 2016
17:10

New Zealand	40–5	Portugal

Sydney Football Stadium, Sydney

6 February 2016
17:32

Australia	26–12	Canada

Sydney Football Stadium, Sydney

6 February 2016
20:41

Canada	17–26	Portugal

Sydney Football Stadium, Sydney

6 February 2016
21:03

New Zealand	17–17	Australia

Sydney Football Stadium, Sydney

=== Pool B ===
Team	Pld	W	D	L	PF	PA	PD	Pts
South Africa	3	3	0	0	99	26	+73	9
Kenya	3	2	0	1	60	50	+10	7
Scotland	3	1	0	2	61	55	+6	5
Russia	3	0	0	3	15	104	-89	3

6 February 2016
11:44

South Africa	33–7	Scotland

Sydney Football Stadium, Sydney

6 February 2016
12:06

Kenya	24–10	Russia

Sydney Football Stadium, Sydney

6 February 2016
15:02

South Africa	40–0	Russia

Sydney Football Stadium, Sydney

6 February 2016
15:24

Kenya	17–14	Scotland

Sydney Football Stadium, Sydney

6 February 2016
18:43

Scotland	40–5	Russia

Sydney Football Stadium, Sydney

6 February 2016
19:05

South Africa	26–19	Kenya

Sydney Football Stadium, Sydney

=== Pool C ===
Team	Pld	W	D	L	PF	PA	PD	Pts
Fiji	3	3	0	0	99	19	+80	9
Argentina	3	2	0	1	45	38	+7	7
Samoa	3	1	0	2	41	59	-18	5
France	3	0	0	3	26	95	-69	3

6 February 2016
11:00

Fiji	31–0	Samoa

Sydney Football Stadium, Sydney

6 February 2016
11:22

Argentina	17–7	France

Sydney Football Stadium, Sydney

6 February 2016
14:18

Fiji	49–5	France

Sydney Football Stadium, Sydney

6 February 2016
14:40

Argentina	14–12	Samoa

Sydney Football Stadium, Sydney

6 February 2016
17:59

Samoa	29–14	France

Sydney Football Stadium, Sydney

6 February 2016
18:21

Fiji	19–14	Argentina

Sydney Football Stadium, Sydney

=== Pool D ===
Team	Pld	W	D	L	PF	PA	PD	Pts
England	3	3	0	0	64	24	+40	9
United States	3	2	0	1	89	34	+55	7
Wales	3	1	0	2	31	84	-53	5
Japan	3	0	0	3	43	85	-42	3

6 February 2016
12:28

England	26–5	Japan

Sydney Football Stadium, Sydney

6 February 2016
12:50

United States	42–0	Wales

Sydney Football Stadium, Sydney

6 February 2016
16:26

England	21–5	Wales

Sydney Football Stadium, Sydney

6 February 2016
16:48

United States	33–17	Japan

Sydney Football Stadium, Sydney

6 February 2016
19:57

Japan	21–26	Wales

Sydney Football Stadium, Sydney

6 February 2016
20:19

England	17–14	United States

Sydney Football Stadium, Sydney

== Knockout stage ==
=== Shield ===
Quarter-finals
7 February 2016 – 09:45 – Sydney Football Stadium
Portugal	31
Japan	17
7 February 2016 – 10:07 – Sydney Football Stadium
Samoa	28
Russia	24
7 February 2016 – 10:29 – Sydney Football Stadium
Wales	21
Canada	32
7 February 2016 – 10:51 – Sydney Football Stadium
Scotland	22
France	19

Semi-finals
7 February 2016 – 13:18 – Sydney Football Stadium
Japan	17
Russia	24
7 February 2016 – 13:40 – Sydney Football Stadium
Wales	22
France	5

Final
7 February 2016 – 17:11 – Sydney Football Stadium
Russia	19
Wales	26

=== Bowl ===
Quarter-finals
7 February 2016 – 09:45 – Sydney Football Stadium
Portugal	31
Japan	17
7 February 2016 – 10:07 – Sydney Football Stadium
Samoa	28
Russia	24
7 February 2016 – 10:29 – Sydney Football Stadium
Wales	21
Canada	32
7 February 2016 – 10:51 – Sydney Football Stadium
Scotland	22
France	19

Semi-finals
7 February 2016 – 14:02 – Sydney Football Stadium
Portugal	10
Samoa	14
7 February 2016 – 14:24 – Sydney Football Stadium
Canada	35
Scotland	12

Final
7 February 2016 – 17:39 – Sydney Football Stadium
Samoa	12
Canada	17

=== Plate ===
Quarter-finals
7 February 2016 – 11:35 – Sydney Football Stadium
New Zealand	24
United States	7
7 February 2016 – 11:57 – Sydney Football Stadium
Fiji	28
Kenya	12
7 February 2016 – 12:19 – Sydney Football Stadium
England	12
Australia	17
7 February 2016 – 12:41 – Sydney Football Stadium
South Africa	26
Argentina	0

Semi-finals
7 February 2016 – 15:13 – Sydney Football Stadium
United States	21
Kenya	24
7 February 2016 – 15:35 – Sydney Football Stadium
England	14
Argentina	19

Final
7 February 2016 – 18:07 – Sydney Football Stadium
Kenya	0
Argentina	24

=== Cup ===
Quarter-finals
7 February 2016 – 11:35 – Sydney Football Stadium
New Zealand	24
United States	7
7 February 2016 – 11:57 – Sydney Football Stadium
Fiji	28
Kenya	12
7 February 2016 – 12:19 – Sydney Football Stadium
England	12
Australia	17
7 February 2016 – 12:41 – Sydney Football Stadium
South Africa	26
Argentina	0

Semi-finals
7 February 2016 – 15:57 – Sydney Football Stadium
New Zealand	14
Fiji	12
7 February 2016 – 16:19 – Sydney Football Stadium
Australia	12
South Africa	7

Final ^{a}
7 February 2016 – 19:04 – Sydney Football Stadium
New Zealand	27
Australia	24
Third place
7 February 2016 – 18:35 – Sydney Football Stadium
Fiji	26
South Africa	12

== Notes ==
^a The match was Australia's fourth Cup final on home soil. The Australian try scorers were Henry Hutchison, who scored two in the first half, while Sam Myers and Greg Jeloudev each scored a try in the second half. For New Zealand, Rieko Ioane scored a hat-trick, while captain Tim Mikkelson and Kurt Baker each scored a try.
