= 2016 Singapore Sevens =

- Sevens World Series XVII
- Host nation: Singapore
- Date: 16–17 April 2016

Cup
- Champion: Kenya
- Runner-up: Fiji
- Third: South Africa

Plate
- Winner: Samoa
- Runner-up: New Zealand

Bowl
- Winner: Scotland
- Runner-up: United States

Shield
- Winner: Russia
- Runner-up: Wales

Tournament details
- Matches played: 45

The 2016 Singapore Sevens was the eighth tournament of the 2015–16 World Rugby Sevens Series. The tournament was played on 16–17 April 2016 at National Stadium in Singapore. It was the fourth time the Singapore Sevens was part of the World Sevens Series, having last hosted an event on the circuit in 2006.

== Format ==
Sixteen teams are drawn into four pools of four teams each. Each team plays each of the other teams their pool once. The top two teams from each pool advance to the Cup/Plate brackets. The bottom two teams from each group go to the Bowl/Shield brackets.

== Teams ==
The 16 participating teams for the tournament:

- Argentina
- Australia
- Canada
- England
- Fiji
- France
- Japan
- Kenya
- New Zealand
- Portugal
- Samoa
- Scotland
- South Africa
- Russia
- United States
- Wales

== Pool stages ==
=== Pool A ===
Team	Pld	W	D	L	PF	PA	PD	Pts
Fiji	3	2	0	1	78	40	+38	7
Samoa	3	2	0	1	61	38	+23	7
England	3	2	0	1	38	38	0	7
Portugal	3	0	0	3	19	80	-61	3

16 April 2016
12:12

Fiji	14–28	Samoa

National Stadium, Singapore

16 April 2016
12:34

England	14–7	Portugal

National Stadium, Singapore

16 April 2016
15:33

Fiji	38–0	Portugal

National Stadium, Singapore

16 April 2016
15:55

England	12–5	Samoa

National Stadium, Singapore

16 April 2016
19:04

Samoa	28–12	Portugal

National Stadium, Singapore

16 April 2016
19:26

Fiji	26–12	England

National Stadium, Singapore

=== Pool B ===
Team	Pld	W	D	L	PF	PA	PD	Pts
France	3	3	0	0	69	36	+33	9
New Zealand	3	2	0	1	43	53	-10	7
United States	3	1	0	2	65	52	+13	5
Canada	3	0	0	3	50	86	-36	3

16 April 2016
10:44

New Zealand	0–24	France

National Stadium, Singapore

16 April 2016
11:06

United States	36–14	Canada

National Stadium, Singapore

16 April 2016
14:05

New Zealand	24–17	Canada

National Stadium, Singapore

16 April 2016
14:27

United States	17–19	France

National Stadium, Singapore

16 April 2016
17:26

France	26–19	Canada

National Stadium, Singapore

16 April 2016
17:48

New Zealand	19–12	United States

National Stadium, Singapore

=== Pool C ===
Team	Pld	W	D	L	PF	PA	PD	Pts
South Africa	3	3	0	0	68	10	+58	9
Kenya	3	1	1	1	33	33	0	6
Scotland	3	1	1	1	48	62	-14	6
Russia	3	0	0	3	34	78	-44	3

16 April 2016
10:00

South Africa	33–0	Scotland

National Stadium, Singapore

16 April 2016
10:22

Kenya	21–7	Russia

National Stadium, Singapore

16 April 2016
13:21

South Africa	21–10	Russia

National Stadium, Singapore

16 April 2016
13:43

Kenya	12–12	Scotland

National Stadium, Singapore

16 April 2016
16:42

Scotland	36–17	Russia

National Stadium, Singapore

16 April 2016
17:04

South Africa	14–0	Kenya

National Stadium, Singapore

=== Pool D ===
Team	Pld	W	D	L	PF	PA	PD	Pts
Argentina	3	2	1	0	75	49	+26	8
Australia	3	2	0	1	55	36	+19	7
Japan	3	1	1	1	59	57	+2	6
Wales	3	0	0	3	52	99	-47	3

16 April 2016
11:28

Australia	7–12	Argentina

National Stadium, Singapore

16 April 2016
11:50

Wales	19–26	Japan

National Stadium, Singapore

16 April 2016
14:49

Australia	17–12	Japan

National Stadium, Singapore

16 April 2016
15:11

Wales	21–42	Argentina

National Stadium, Singapore

16 April 2016
18:20

Argentina	21–21	Japan

National Stadium, Singapore

16 April 2016
18:42

Australia	31–12	Wales

National Stadium, Singapore

=== Knockout stage ===
==== Shield ====
Quarter-finals
17 April 2016 – 10:30 – National Stadium
England	26
Wales	17
17 April 2016 – 10:52 – National Stadium
Scotland	26
Canada	19
17 April 2016 – 11:14 – National Stadium
Japan	7
Portugal	14
17 April 2016 – 11:36 – National Stadium
United States	24
Russia	5

Semi-finals
17 April 2016 – 13:51 – National Stadium
Wales	24
Canada	22
17 April 2016 – 14:13 – National Stadium
Japan	15
Russia	17

Final
17 April 2016 – 17:37 – National Stadium
Wales	7
Russia	24

==== Bowl ====
Quarter-finals
17 April 2016 – 10:30 – National Stadium
England	26
Wales	17
17 April 2016 – 10:52 – National Stadium
Scotland	26
Canada	19
17 April 2016 – 11:14 – National Stadium
Japan	7
Portugal	14
17 April 2016 – 11:36 – National Stadium
United States	24
Russia	5

Semi-finals
17 April 2016 – 14:35 – National Stadium
England	14
Scotland	19
17 April 2016 – 14:57 – National Stadium
Portugal	0
United States	26

Final
17 April 2016 – 18:05 – National Stadium
Scotland	14
United States	10

==== Plate ====
Quarter-finals
17 April 2016 – 11:58 – National Stadium
Fiji	19
Australia	14
17 April 2016 – 12:20 – National Stadium
South Africa	12
New Zealand	7
17 April 2016 – 12:42 – National Stadium
Argentina	12
Samoa	7
17 April 2016 – 13:04 – National Stadium
France	7
Kenya	28

Semi-finals
17 April 2016 – 15:44 – National Stadium
Australia	7
New Zealand	31
17 April 2016 – 16:06 – National Stadium
Samoa	21
France	7

Final
17 April 2016 – 18:33 – National Stadium
New Zealand	21
Samoa	26

==== Cup ====
Quarter-finals
17 April 2016 – 11:58 – National Stadium
Fiji	19
Australia	14
17 April 2016 – 12:20 – National Stadium
South Africa	12
New Zealand	7
17 April 2016 – 12:42 – National Stadium
Argentina	12
Samoa	7
10 April 2016 – 13:04 – National Stadium
France	7
Kenya	28

Semi-finals
17 April 2016 – 16:28 – National Stadium
Fiji	26
South Africa	21
17 April 2016 – 16:50 – National Stadium
Argentina	12
Kenya	15

Final
17 April 2016 – 19:38 – National Stadium
Fiji	7
Kenya	30
Third place
17 April 2016 – 19:01 – National Stadium
South Africa	28
Argentina	0
