= 2015–16 World Rugby Sevens Series =

17th annual international series in men's rugby sevens

2015–16 World Rugby Sevens
- Series XVII
- Hosts: United Arab Emirates; South Africa; New Zealand; Australia; United States; Canada; Hong Kong; Singapore; France; England
- Date: 4 Dec 2015 – 22 May 2016

Final positions
- Champions: Fiji
- Runners-up: South Africa
- Third: New Zealand

The 2015–16 World Rugby Sevens Series, known for sponsorship reasons as the HSBC World Rugby Sevens Series, was the 17th annual series of rugby union sevens tournaments for national men's rugby sevens teams. The Sevens Series has been run by World Rugby since 1999–2000. This season, the series expanded from nine to ten events.

== Core teams ==
Fourteen teams from the 2014-15 season retained core status for the 2015–16 season. A fifteenth team, Russia, claimed core team status for the 2015–16 series at the 2015 Hong Kong Sevens qualifier. The core teams were:

- Argentina
- Australia
- Canada
- England
- Fiji
- France
- Kenya
- New Zealand
- Portugal
- Russia
- Samoa
- Scotland
- South Africa
- United States
- Wales

Russia replaced Japan, which lost core team status having finished last of the fifteen core teams in the 2014–15 Sevens World Series.

== Tour venues ==
The official schedule for the 2015–16 World Rugby Sevens Series was as follows:

2015–16 Venues
Leg	Stadium	City	Date	Winner
Dubai	The Sevens	Dubai	4–5 December 2015	Fiji
South Africa	Cape Town Stadium	Cape Town	12–13 December 2015	South Africa
New Zealand	Westpac Stadium	Wellington	30–31 January 2016	New Zealand
Australia	Allianz Stadium	Sydney	6–7 February 2016	New Zealand
United States	Sam Boyd Stadium	Las Vegas	4–6 March 2016	Fiji
Canada	BC Place	Vancouver	12–13 March 2016	New Zealand
Hong Kong	Hong Kong Stadium	Hong Kong	8–10 April 2016	Fiji
Singapore	National Stadium	Singapore	16–17 April 2016	Kenya
France	Stade Jean-Bouin	Paris	13–15 May 2016	Samoa
England	Twickenham Stadium	London	21–22 May 2016	Scotland

=== Changes ===
There were three new tournaments in the series, with two events being discontinued:

- The Canada Sevens was a new stop at BC Place in Vancouver, paired with the USA Sevens.
- The Singapore Sevens returned, replacing the Japan Sevens.
- The France Sevens returned for the first time since 2006, replacing the Scotland Sevens.

Two other existing tournaments had venue changes:

- The Australian Sevens moved from Gold Coast to Sydney.
- The South Africa Sevens moved from Port Elizabeth to Cape Town.

== Standings ==
The final standings after completion of the ten tournaments of the series are shown in the table below.

The points awarded to teams at each tournament, as well as the overall season totals, are shown. Gold indicates the event champions. Silver indicates the event runner-ups. Bronze indicates the event third place finishers. A dash (–) is recorded in the event column if a team did not compete at a tournament.

2015–16 World Rugby Sevens – Series XVII
Pos.	Event Team	Dubai	Cape Town	Wellington	Sydney	Las Vegas	Vancouver	Hong Kong	Singapore	Paris	London	Points total
1	Fiji	22	13	17	17	22	15	22	19	19	15	181
2	South Africa	13	22	19	15	17	19	17	17	13	19	171
3	New Zealand	15	10	22	22	13	22	19	12	10	13	158
4	Australia	12	10	13	19	19	17	15	10	12	7	134
5	Argentina	10	19	12	13	10	5	8	15	15	12	119
6	United States	17	12	10	10	15	12	12	7	5	17	117
7	Kenya	5	15	10	12	10	1	10	22	10	3	98
8	England	19	7	15	10	1	5	13	5	7	10	92
9	Samoa	10	3	8	7	3	13	5	13	22	5	89
10	Scotland	7	8	7	5	5	10	7	8	8	22	87
11	France	8	17	3	1	7	7	5	10	17	10	85
12	Wales	5	5	1	3	8	10	10	2	2	8	54
13	Canada	3	5	5	8	2	8	2	1	1	5	40
14	Russia	1	2	2	2	5	3	3	3	5	2	28
15	Japan	2	–	5	1	12	–	–	1	–	–	21
16	Portugal	1	1	1	5	1	2	1	5	3	1	21
17	Brazil	–	–	–	–	–	1	–	–	1	1	3
18	Zimbabwe	–	1	–	–	–	–	–	–	–	–	1
19	South Korea	–	–	–	–	–	–	1	–	–	–	1

Source: World Rugby. Archived

Legend
Event Medalists
Gold	Event Champions
Silver	Event Runner-ups
Bronze	Event Third place finishers
Qualification for the 2016–17 World Sevens Series
No colour	Core team in 2015–16 and re-qualified as a core team for the 2016–17 World Rugby Sevens Series
Pink	Relegated as the lowest placed core team at the end of the 2015–16 season
Yellow	Not a core team

== Tournaments ==
=== Dubai ===
The opening event of the season saw Fiji starting their defense of the title by taking out the opening event of the season in Dubai. On the opening day of competition, Fiji, South Africa and England each recorded three straight wins to finish on top. New Zealand finished on top in their group but not before losing to the United States in Pool C.

South Africa got knocked out in the quarter-finals by the United States but would still end up taking home the plate after they defeated Australia in the final. While for Fiji, they would take the Dubai Sevens after they initially came from behind to win against England and taking the early lead.

Event	Winners	Score	Finalists	Semifinalists
Cup	Fiji	28–17	England	United States (third place); New Zealand
Plate	South Africa	19–14	Australia	Argentina; Samoa
Bowl	France	24–14	Scotland	Kenya; Wales
Shield	Canada	19–17	Japan	Portugal; Russia

=== South Africa ===
After Dubai, the teams had a back to back with Cape Town being the next stop in the series.

Event	Winners	Score	Finalists	Semifinalists
Cup	South Africa	29–14	Argentina	France (third place); Kenya
Plate	Fiji	29–19	United States	Australia; New Zealand
Bowl	Scotland	19–0	England	Canada; Wales
Shield	Samoa	40–5	Russia	Portugal; Zimbabwe

=== New Zealand ===
Event	Winners	Score	Finalists	Semifinalists
Cup	New Zealand	24–21	South Africa	Fiji (third place); England
Plate	Australia	21–5	Argentina	Kenya; United States
Bowl	Samoa	19–7	Scotland	Japan; Canada
Shield	France	14–7	Russia	Portugal; Wales

=== Australia ===
Event	Winners	Score	Finalists	Semifinalists
Cup	New Zealand	27–24	Australia	Fiji (third place); South Africa
Plate	Argentina	24–0	Kenya	United States; England
Bowl	Canada	17–12	Samoa	Scotland; Portugal
Shield	Wales	26–19	Russia	Japan; France

=== United States ===
Event	Winners	Score	Finalists	Semifinalists
Cup	Fiji	21–15	Australia	South Africa (third place); United States
Plate	New Zealand	27–7	Japan	Kenya; Argentina
Bowl	Wales	21–7	France	Russia; Scotland
Shield	Samoa	24–12	Canada	England; Portugal

=== Canada ===
Event	Winners	Score	Finalists	Semifinalists
Cup	New Zealand	19–14	South Africa	Australia (third place); Fiji
Plate	Samoa	31–19	United States	Wales; Scotland
Bowl	Canada	19–17	France	Argentina; England
Shield	Russia	17–10	Portugal	Kenya; Brazil

=== Hong Kong ===
Event	Winners	Score	Finalists	Semifinalists
Cup	Fiji	21-7	New Zealand	South Africa (third place); Australia
Plate	England	19–0	United States	Wales; Kenya
Bowl	Argentina	26–0	Scotland	France; Samoa
Shield	Russia	19–14	Canada	South Korea; Portugal

=== Singapore ===
Event	Winners	Score	Finalists	Semifinalists
Cup	Kenya	30–7	Fiji	South Africa (third place); Argentina
Plate	Samoa	26–21	New Zealand	Australia; France
Bowl	Scotland	14–10	United States	England; Portugal
Shield	Russia	24–7	Wales	Japan; Canada

=== France ===
Event	Winners	Score	Finalists	Semifinalists
Cup	Samoa	29 –26	Fiji	France (third place); Argentina
Plate	South Africa	17 – 7	Australia	New Zealand; Kenya
Bowl	Scotland	28 – 10	England	Russia; United States
Shield	Portugal	24 – 19	Wales	Canada; Brazil

=== England ===
Event	Winners	Score	Finalists	Semifinalists
Cup	Scotland	27 –26	South Africa	United States (third place); Fiji
Plate	New Zealand	29 –14	Argentina	France; England
Bowl	Wales	24 –19	Australia	Canada; Samoa
Shield	Kenya	31 –7	Russia	Brazil; Portugal

== Team statistics ==
Rank	Team	Matches	Points	Ø-Points	Tries	Ø-Tries
1	Fiji	48	1368	28.50	213	4.44
2	South Africa	48	1199	24.98	187	3.90
3	Australia	46	971	21.11	153	3.33
4	New Zealand	47	964	20.51	156	3.32
5	United States	46	962	20.91	152	3.30
6	Samoa	46	877	19.07	140	3.04
7	Canada	45	864	19.20	140	3.11
8	France	45	829	18.42	131	2.91
9	England	44	760	17.27	118	2.68
10	Kenya	43	751	17.47	120	2.79
11	Scotland	45	745	16.56	119	2.64
12	Argentina	45	740	16.44	116	2.58
13	Wales	43	738	17.16	116	2.70
14	Russia	46	546	11.87	92	2.00
15	Japan	27	442	16.37	70	2.59
16	Portugal	41	332	8.10	54	1.32
17	South Korea	5	35	7.00	5	1.00
18	Brazil	5	19	3.80	3	0.60
19	Zimbabwe	5	17	3.40	3	0.60

== Players ==
=== Scoring leaders ===
Tries scored
Rank	Player	Tries
1	(South Africa) Seabelo Senatla	66
2	(United States) Perry Baker	48
3	Samoa Toloa	37
4	(Fiji) Savenaca Rawaca	35
5	(Kenya) Collins Injera	32

Points scored
Rank	Player	Points
1	(United States) Madison Hughes	331
2	(South Africa) Seabelo Senatla	330
3	(Canada) Nathan Hirayama	295
4	(Fiji) Vatemo Ravouvou	287
5	(United States) Perry Baker	240

Updated: 24 May 2016

=== Dream Team ===
- (Fiji) Jasa Veremalua
- (Fiji) Osea Kolinisau
- (South Africa) Kwagga Smith
- (South Africa) Seabelo Senatla
- (United States) Perry Baker
- (Kenya) Collins Injera
- (Samoa) Fa'alemiga Selesele

== See also ==
- 2015–16 World Rugby Women's Sevens Series
