= 2016 Canada Sevens =

- Sevens World Series XVII
- Host nation: Canada
- Date: 12–13 March 2016

Cup
- Champion: New Zealand
- Runner-up: South Africa
- Third: Australia

Plate
- Winner: Samoa
- Runner-up: United States

Bowl
- Winner: Canada
- Runner-up: France

Shield
- Winner: Russia
- Runner-up: Portugal

Tournament details
- Matches played: 45

The 2016 Canada Sevens is the first edition of the Canada Sevens tournament, and the sixth tournament of the 2015–16 World Rugby Sevens Series. The tournament was played on 12–13 March 2016 at BC Place in Vancouver, BC.

New Zealand won the Cup final.

== Format ==
Sixteen teams are drawn into four pools of four teams each. Each team plays each of the other teams their pool once. The top two teams from each pool advance to the Cup/Plate brackets. The bottom two teams from each group go to the Bowl/Shield brackets.

== Teams ==
The 16 participating teams for the tournament:

- Argentina
- Australia
- Brazil
- Canada
- England
- Fiji
- France
- Kenya
- New Zealand
- Portugal
- Samoa
- Scotland
- South Africa
- Russia
- United States
- Wales

== Pool stages ==
=== Pool A ===
Team	Pld	W	D	L	PF	PA	PD	Pts
Fiji	3	3	0	0	124	24	+100	9
Samoa	3	2	0	1	74	64	+10	7
Kenya	3	1	0	2	81	55	+26	5
Portugal	3	0	0	3	12	148	–136	3

12 March 2016
10:14

Fiji	38–5	Samoa

BC Place, Vancouver

12 March 2016
10:36

Kenya	43–5	Portugal

BC Place, Vancouver

12 March 2016
13:50

Fiji	62–0	Portugal

BC Place, Vancouver

12 March 2016
14:12

Kenya	19–26	Samoa

BC Place, Vancouver

12 March 2016
17:38

Samoa	43–7	Portugal

BC Place, Vancouver

12 March 2016
18:00

Fiji	24–19	Kenya

BC Place, Vancouver

=== Pool B ===
Team	Pld	W	D	L	PF	PA	PD	Pts
Australia	3	2	0	1	104	33	+71	7
Wales	3	2	0	1	92	68	+24	7
Canada	3	2	0	1	62	50	+12	7
Russia	3	0	0	3	17	124	–107	3

12 March 2016
11:42

Australia	43–5	Russia

BC Place, Vancouver

12 March 2016
12:04

Wales	26–19	Canada

BC Place, Vancouver

12 March 2016
15:18

Wales	52–0	Russia

BC Place, Vancouver

12 March 2016
15:40

Australia	12–14	Canada

BC Place, Vancouver

12 March 2016
19:06

Australia	49–14	Wales

BC Place, Vancouver

12 March 2016
19:28

Russia	12–29	Canada

BC Place, Vancouver

=== Pool C ===
Team	Pld	W	D	L	PF	PA	PD	Pts
South Africa	3	3	0	0	96	7	+89	9
Scotland	3	2	0	1	52	50	+2	7
Argentina	3	1	0	2	42	51	–9	5
Brazil	3	0	0	3	12	94	–82	3

12 March 2016
09:30

South Africa	43–0	Scotland

BC Place, Vancouver

12 March 2016
09:52

Argentina	35–5	Brazil

BC Place, Vancouver

12 March 2016
13:06

South Africa	26–7	Brazil

BC Place, Vancouver

12 March 2016
13:28

Argentina	7–19	Scotland

BC Place, Vancouver

12 March 2016
16:54

Scotland	33–0	Brazil

BC Place, Vancouver

12 March 2016
17:16

South Africa	27–0	Argentina

BC Place, Vancouver

=== Pool D ===
Team	Pld	W	D	L	PF	PA	PD	Pts
New Zealand	3	3	0	0	48	15	+33	9
United States	3	2	0	1	64	43	+21	7
England	3	1	0	2	26	36	–10	5
France	3	0	0	3	36	80	–44	3

12 March 2016
10:58

United States	42–14	France

BC Place, Vancouver

12 March 2016
11:20

New Zealand	7–0	England

BC Place, Vancouver

12 March 2016
14:34

United States	17–12	England

BC Place, Vancouver

12 March 2016
14:56

New Zealand	24–10	France

BC Place, Vancouver

12 March 2016
18:22

France	12–14	England

BC Place, Vancouver

12 March 2016
18:44

United States	5–17	New Zealand

BC Place, Vancouver

== Knockout stage ==
=== Shield ===
Quarter-finals

Semi-finals

Final

13 March 2016 – 09:40 – BC Place, Vancouver

Kenya
21

13 March 2016 – 12:56 – BC Place, Vancouver

France
24

Kenya
7

13 March 2016 – 10:02 – BC Place, Vancouver

Russia
24

Argentina
19

13 March 2016 – 16:02 – BC Place, Vancouver

Russia
0

Russia
17

13 March 2016 – 10:24 – BC Place, Vancouver

Portugal
10

England
31

13 March 2016 – 13:18 – BC Place, Vancouver

Portugal
0

Portugal
17

13 March 2016 – 10:46 – BC Place, Vancouver

Brazil
7

Canada
19

Brazil
0

=== Bowl ===
Quarter-finals

Semi-finals

Final

13 March 2016 – 09:40 – BC Place, Vancouver

Kenya
21

13 March 2016 – 13:40 – BC Place, Vancouver

France
24

France
19

13 March 2016 – 10:02 – BC Place, Vancouver

Argentina
17

Argentina
19

13 March 2016 – 16:30 – BC Place, Vancouver

Russia
0

France
17

13 March 2016 – 10:24 – BC Place, Vancouver

Canada
19

England
31

13 March 2016 – 14:02 – BC Place, Vancouver

Portugal
0

England
7

13 March 2016 – 10:46 – BC Place, Vancouver

Canada
17

Canada
19

Brazil
0

=== Plate ===
Quarter-finals

Semi-finals

Final

13 March 2016 – 11:08 – BC Place, Vancouver

Fiji
31

13 March 2016 – 14:24 – BC Place, Vancouver

United States
26

United States
38

13 March 2016 – 11:30 – BC Place, Vancouver

Wales
12

South Africa
31

13 March 2016 – 16:58 – BC Place, Vancouver

Wales
0

United States
19

13 March 2016 – 11:52 – BC Place, Vancouver

Samoa
31

New Zealand
17

13 March 2016 – 14:46 – BC Place, Vancouver

Samoa
12

Samoa
24

13 March 2016 – 12:14 – BC Place, Vancouver

Scotland
17

Australia
24

Scotland
17

=== Cup ===
Quarter-finals

Semi-finals

Final

13 March 2016 – 11:08 – BC Place, Vancouver

Fiji
31

13 March 2016 – 15:08 – BC Place, Vancouver

United States
26

Fiji
19

13 March 2016 – 11:30 – BC Place, Vancouver

South Africa
31

South Africa
31

13 March 2016 – 18:00 – BC Place, Vancouver

Wales
0

South Africa
14

13 March 2016 – 11:52 – BC Place, Vancouver

New Zealand
19

New Zealand
17

13 March 2016 – 15:30 – BC Place, Vancouver

Samoa
12

New Zealand
28

13 March 2016 – 12:14 – BC Place, Vancouver

Australia
19

Third place

Australia
24

13 March 2016 – 17:26 – BC Place, Vancouver

Scotland
17

Fiji
12

Australia
19
