= 2016 Hong Kong Sevens =

Rugby union sevens tournament

- Sevens World Series XVII
- Host nation: Hong Kong
- Date: 8–10 April 2016

Cup
- Champion: Fiji
- Runner-up: New Zealand
- Third: South Africa

Plate
- Winner: England
- Runner-up: United States

Bowl
- Winner: Argentina
- Runner-up: Scotland

Shield
- Winner: Russia
- Runner-up: Canada

Tournament details
- Matches played: 45

The 2016 Hong Kong Sevens was the 41st edition of the Hong Kong Sevens tournament, and the seventh tournament of the 2015–16 World Rugby Sevens Series. The tournament was played on 8–10 April 2016 at Hong Kong Stadium in Hong Kong.

It was won by Fiji.

== Format ==
As in the last tournament, there will be a main draw with the fifteen World Series core teams and one invited team, and a qualifying tournament featuring twelve teams, the winner of which will be given core status in the next series.

== Teams ==
The teams confirmed for both the World Series and World Series Qualifier events at the 2016 Hong Kong Sevens are listed below:

=== Main draw ===
- Argentina
- Australia
- Canada
- England
- Fiji
- France
- Kenya
- New Zealand
- Portugal
- Russia
- Samoa
- Scotland
- South Africa
- South Korea
- United States
- Wales

=== World Series Qualifier ===
- Brazil
- Cayman Islands
- Chile
- Sri Lanka
- Germany
- Hong Kong
- Japan
- Mexico
- Morocco
- Papua New Guinea
- Spain
- Zimbabwe

== Main draw ==
=== Pool stage ===
==== Pool A ====
Pos	Team	Pld	W	D	L	PF	PA	PD	Pts
1	New Zealand	3	3	0	0	52	27	+25	9
2	Kenya	3	1	0	2	34	22	+12	5
3	France	3	1	0	2	46	53	−7	5
4	Samoa	3	1	0	2	34	64	−30	5

8 April 2016
18:10

Samoa	0–24	Kenya

Hong Kong Stadium, Hong Kong

8 April 2016
19:44

New Zealand	19–17	France

Hong Kong Stadium, Hong Kong

9 April 2016
11:18

Samoa	24–12	France

Hong Kong Stadium, Hong Kong

9 April 2016
11:40

New Zealand	5–0	Kenya

Hong Kong Stadium, Hong Kong

9 April 2016
15:18

France	17–10	Kenya

Hong Kong Stadium, Hong Kong

9 April 2016
15:40

New Zealand	28–10	Samoa

Hong Kong Stadium, Hong Kong

==== Pool B ====
Pos	Team	Pld	W	D	L	PF	PA	PD	Pts
1	England	3	2	1	0	52	26	+26	8
2	South Africa	3	2	0	1	95	21	+74	7
3	Scotland	3	1	0	2	28	65	−37	5
4	Russia	3	0	1	2	27	90	−63	4

8 April 2016
19:16

Scotland	28–15	Russia

Hong Kong Stadium, Hong Kong

8 April 2016
20:50

South Africa	14–21	England

Hong Kong Stadium, Hong Kong

9 April 2016
13:32

Scotland	0–19	England

Hong Kong Stadium, Hong Kong

9 April 2016
13:54

South Africa	50–0	Russia

Hong Kong Stadium, Hong Kong

9 April 2016
17:32

England	12–12	Russia

Hong Kong Stadium, Hong Kong

9 April 2016
17:54

South Africa	31–0	Scotland

Hong Kong Stadium, Hong Kong

==== Pool C ====
Pos	Team	Pld	W	D	L	PF	PA	PD	Pts
1	United States	3	3	0	0	69	26	+43	9
2	Australia	3	2	0	1	80	29	+51	7
3	Argentina	3	1	0	2	38	54	−16	5
4	Portugal	3	0	0	3	12	90	−78	3

8 April 2016
18:54

United States	21–5	Portugal

Hong Kong Stadium, Hong Kong

8 April 2016
20:28

Australia	28–0	Argentina

Hong Kong Stadium, Hong Kong

9 April 2016
12:48

United States	26–14	Argentina

Hong Kong Stadium, Hong Kong

9 April 2016
13:10

Australia	45–7	Portugal

Hong Kong Stadium, Hong Kong

9 April 2016
16:48

Argentina	24–0	Portugal

Hong Kong Stadium, Hong Kong

9 April 2016
17:10

Australia	7–22	United States

Hong Kong Stadium, Hong Kong

==== Pool D ====
Pos	Team	Pld	W	D	L	PF	PA	PD	Pts
1	Fiji	3	3	0	0	112	27	+85	9
2	Wales	3	2	0	1	74	60	+14	7
3	Canada	3	1	0	2	58	57	+1	5
4	South Korea	3	0	0	3	28	128	−100	3

8 April 2016
18:32

Wales	40–14	South Korea

Hong Kong Stadium, Hong Kong

8 April 2016
20:06

Fiji	19–17	Canada

Hong Kong Stadium, Hong Kong

9 April 2016
12:02

Wales	24–10	Canada

Hong Kong Stadium, Hong Kong

9 April 2016
12:24

Fiji	57–0	South Korea

Hong Kong Stadium, Hong Kong

9 April 2016
16:02

Canada	31–14	South Korea

Hong Kong Stadium, Hong Kong

9 April 2016
16:24

Fiji	36–10	Wales

Hong Kong Stadium, Hong Kong

=== Knockout stage ===
==== Shield ====
Quarter-finals
10 April 2016 – 09:30 – Hong Kong Stadium
France	45
South Korea	0
10 April 2016 – 09:52 – Hong Kong Stadium
Argentina	22
Russia	0
10 April 2016 – 10:14 – Hong Kong Stadium
Canada	10
Samoa	19
10 April 2016 – 10:36 – Hong Kong Stadium
Scotland	5
Portugal	0

Semi-finals
10 April 2016 – 13:30 – Hong Kong Stadium
South Korea	7
Russia	22
10 April 2016 – 13:52 – Hong Kong Stadium
Canada	19
Portugal	5

Final
10 April 2016 – 17:00 – Hong Kong Stadium
Russia	19
Canada	14

==== Bowl ====
Quarter-finals
10 April 2016 – 09:30 – Hong Kong Stadium
France	45
South Korea	0
10 April 2016 – 09:52 – Hong Kong Stadium
Argentina	22
Russia	0
10 April 2016 – 10:14 – Hong Kong Stadium
Canada	10
Samoa	19
10 April 2016 – 10:36 – Hong Kong Stadium
Scotland	5
Portugal	0

Semi-finals
10 April 2016 – 14:14 – Hong Kong Stadium
France	7
Argentina	14
10 April 2016 – 14:36 – Hong Kong Stadium
Samoa	14
Scotland	19

Final
10 April 2016 – 17:30 – Hong Kong Stadium
Argentina	26
Scotland	0

==== Plate ====
Quarter-finals
10 April 2016 – 10:58 – Hong Kong Stadium
New Zealand	17
Wales	7
10 April 2016 – 11:20 – Hong Kong Stadium
United States	0
South Africa	28
10 April 2016 – 11:42 – Hong Kong Stadium
Fiji	12
Kenya	10
10 April 2016 – 12:04 – Hong Kong Stadium
England	5
Australia	14

Semi-finals
10 April 2016 – 15:00 – Hong Kong Stadium
Wales	0
United States	27
10 April 2016 – 15:22 – Hong Kong Stadium
Kenya	0
England	33

Final
10 April 2016 – 18:00 – Hong Kong Stadium
United States	0
England	19

==== Cup ====
Quarter-finals
10 April 2016 – 10:58 – Hong Kong Stadium
New Zealand	17
Wales	7
10 April 2016 – 11:20 – Hong Kong Stadium
United States	0
South Africa	28
10 April 2016 – 11:42 – Hong Kong Stadium
Fiji	12
Kenya	10
10 April 2016 – 12:04 – Hong Kong Stadium
England	5
Australia	14

Semi-finals
10 April 2016 – 15:44 – Hong Kong Stadium
New Zealand	12
South Africa	7
10 April 2016 – 16:06 – Hong Kong Stadium
Fiji	34
Australia	5

Final
10 April 2016 – 19:00 – Hong Kong Stadium
New Zealand	7
Fiji	21
Third place
10 April 2016 – 18:30 – Hong Kong Stadium
South Africa	14
Australia	12

== World Series Qualifier ==
=== Pool stage ===
==== Pool E ====
Pos	Team	Pld	W	D	L	PF	PA	PD	Pts
1	Germany	3	2	1	0	74	19	+55	8
2	Zimbabwe	3	2	1	0	68	26	+42	8
3	Hong Kong	3	1	0	2	55	31	+24	5
4	Cayman Islands	3	0	0	3	5	126	−121	3

8 April 2016
14:28

Zimbabwe	14–14	Germany

Hong Kong Stadium, Hong Kong

8 April 2016
14:50

Hong Kong	43–0	Cayman Islands

Hong Kong Stadium, Hong Kong

8 April 2016
16:40

Zimbabwe	35–5	Cayman Islands

Hong Kong Stadium, Hong Kong

8 April 2016
17:02

Hong Kong	5–12	Germany

Hong Kong Stadium, Hong Kong

9 April 2016
9:44

Germany	48–0	Cayman Islands

Hong Kong Stadium, Hong Kong

9 April 2016
10:50

Zimbabwe	19–7	Hong Kong

Hong Kong Stadium, Hong Kong

==== Pool F ====
Pos	Team	Pld	W	D	L	PF	PA	PD	Pts
1	Spain	3	3	0	0	93	0	+93	9
2	Chile	3	2	0	1	48	40	+8	7
3	Mexico	3	1	0	2	31	85	−54	5
4	Papua New Guinea	3	0	0	3	22	69	−47	3

8 April 2016
13:44

Spain	33–0	Papua New Guinea

Hong Kong Stadium, Hong Kong

8 April 2016
14:06

Chile	29–14	Mexico

Hong Kong Stadium, Hong Kong

8 April 2016
15:56

Spain	41–0	Mexico

Hong Kong Stadium, Hong Kong

8 April 2016
16:18

Chile	19–7	Papua New Guinea

Hong Kong Stadium, Hong Kong

9 April 2016
9:22

Papua New Guinea	15–17	Mexico

Hong Kong Stadium, Hong Kong

9 April 2016
10:28

Spain	19–0	Chile

Hong Kong Stadium, Hong Kong

==== Pool G ====
Pos	Team	Pld	W	D	L	PF	PA	PD	Pts
1	Japan	3	3	0	0	112	0	+112	9
2	Morocco	3	1	1	1	38	81	−43	6
3	Tonga	3	1	0	2	43	55	−12	5
4	Brazil	3	0	1	2	24	81	−57	4

8 April 2016
13:00

Japan	36–0	Brazil

Hong Kong Stadium, Hong Kong

8 April 2016
13:22

Tonga	17–19	Morocco

Hong Kong Stadium, Hong Kong

8 April 2016
15:12

Japan	45–0	Morocco

Hong Kong Stadium, Hong Kong

8 April 2016
15:34

Tonga	26–5	Brazil

Hong Kong Stadium, Hong Kong

9 April 2016
9:00

Brazil	19–19	Morocco

Hong Kong Stadium, Hong Kong

9 April 2016
10:06

Japan	31–0	Tonga

Hong Kong Stadium, Hong Kong

=== Knockout stage ===
Qualifier Quarterfinals
9 April 2016 – 18:16 – Hong Kong Stadium
Spain	7
Hong Kong	12
9 April 2016 – 18:38 – Hong Kong Stadium
Germany	19
Morocco	14
9 April 2016 – 19:00 – Hong Kong Stadium
Zimbabwe	19
Chile	5
9 April 2016 – 19:22 – Hong Kong Stadium
Japan	33
Tonga	0

Qualifier Semi-finals
10 April 2016 – 12:26 – Hong Kong Stadium
Hong Kong	17
Germany	7
10 April 2016 – 12:48 – Hong Kong Stadium
Zimbabwe	0
Japan	22

Qualifier Final
10 April 2016 – 16:30 – Hong Kong Stadium
Hong Kong	14
Japan	24
