= 2016 USA Sevens =

- Sevens World Series XVII
- Host nation: United States
- Date: 4–6 March 2016

Cup
- Champion: Fiji
- Runner-up: Australia
- Third: South Africa

Plate
- Winner: New Zealand
- Runner-up: Japan

Bowl
- Winner: Wales
- Runner-up: France

Shield
- Winner: Samoa
- Runner-up: Canada

Tournament details
- Matches played: 45

The 2016 USA Sevens (also sometimes referred to as the 2016 Las Vegas Sevens) is the thirteenth edition of the USA Sevens tournament, and the fifth tournament of the 2015–16 World Rugby Sevens Series. The tournament was played on 4–6 March 2016 at Sam Boyd Stadium in Las Vegas, Nevada. This was the first time a World Rugby Sevens Series event was contested on artificial turf.

== Format ==
Sixteen teams are drawn into four pools of four teams each. Each team plays everyone in their pool one time. The top two teams from each pool advance to the Cup/Plate brackets. The bottom two teams from each group go to the Bowl/Shield brackets.

== Teams ==
The 16 participating teams for the tournament:

- Argentina
- Australia
- Canada
- England
- Fiji
- France
- Japan
- Kenya
- New Zealand
- Portugal
- Samoa
- Scotland
- South Africa
- Russia
- United States
- Wales

== Pool stages ==
=== Pool A ===
| Team | Pld | W | D | L | PF | PA | PD | Pts |
|---|---|---|---|---|---|---|---|---|
| Kenya | 3 | 3 | 0 | 0 | 84 | 21 | +63 | 9 |
| New Zealand | 3 | 2 | 0 | 1 | 80 | 29 | +51 | 7 |
| Russia | 3 | 1 | 0 | 2 | 52 | 62 | –10 | 5 |
| Portugal | 3 | 0 | 0 | 3 | 7 | 111 | –104 | 3 |

4 March 2016
15:51

| New Zealand | 42–7 | Portugal |

Sam Boyd Stadium, Las Vegas

4 March 2016
16:13

| Kenya | 24–21 | Russia |

Sam Boyd Stadium, Las Vegas

4 March 2016
18:52

| New Zealand | 38–0 | Russia |

Sam Boyd Stadium, Las Vegas

4 March 2016
19:14

| Kenya | 38–0 | Portugal |

Sam Boyd Stadium, Las Vegas

5 March 2016
11:32

| Portugal | 0–31 | Russia |

Sam Boyd Stadium, Las Vegas

5 March 2016
11:54

| New Zealand | 0–22 | Kenya |

Sam Boyd Stadium, Las Vegas

=== Pool B ===
| Team | Pld | W | D | L | PF | PA | PD | Pts |
|---|---|---|---|---|---|---|---|---|
| Australia | 3 | 3 | 0 | 0 | 97 | 12 | +85 | 9 |
| Japan | 3 | 1 | 1 | 1 | 50 | 73 | –23 | 6 |
| Scotland | 3 | 1 | 0 | 2 | 43 | 66 | –23 | 5 |
| England | 3 | 0 | 1 | 2 | 40 | 79 | –39 | 4 |

4 March 2016

| Australia | 26–0 | Scotland |

Sam Boyd Stadium, Las Vegas

4 March 2016

| England | 19–19 | Japan |

Sam Boyd Stadium, Las Vegas

4 March 2016

| Australia | 35–5 | Japan |

Sam Boyd Stadium, Las Vegas

4 March 2016

| England | 14–24 | Scotland |

Sam Boyd Stadium, Las Vegas

5 March 2016

| Scotland | 19–26 | Japan |

Sam Boyd Stadium, Las Vegas

5 March 2016

| Australia | 36–7 | England |

Sam Boyd Stadium, Las Vegas

=== Pool C ===
| Team | Pld | W | D | L | PF | PA | PD | Pts |
|---|---|---|---|---|---|---|---|---|
| Fiji | 3 | 2 | 0 | 1 | 81 | 52 | +29 | 7 |
| Argentina | 3 | 2 | 0 | 1 | 63 | 34 | +29 | 7 |
| France | 3 | 1 | 0 | 2 | 50 | 85 | –35 | 5 |
| Samoa | 3 | 1 | 0 | 2 | 57 | 80 | –23 | 5 |

4 March 2016

| Fiji | 24–28 | Samoa |

Sam Boyd Stadium, Las Vegas

4 March 2016

| Argentina | 26–7 | France |

Sam Boyd Stadium, Las Vegas

4 March 2016

| Fiji | 42–12 | France |

Sam Boyd Stadium, Las Vegas

4 March 2016

| Argentina | 25–12 | Samoa |

Sam Boyd Stadium, Las Vegas

5 March 2016

| Samoa | 17–31 | France |

Sam Boyd Stadium, Las Vegas

5 March 2016

| Fiji | 15–12 | Argentina |

Sam Boyd Stadium, Las Vegas

=== Pool D ===
| Team | Pld | W | D | L | PF | PA | PD | Pts |
|---|---|---|---|---|---|---|---|---|
| South Africa | 3 | 3 | 0 | 0 | 98 | 14 | +84 | 9 |
| United States | 3 | 1 | 1 | 1 | 45 | 67 | –22 | 6 |
| Wales | 3 | 1 | 0 | 2 | 36 | 65 | –29 | 5 |
| Canada | 3 | 0 | 1 | 2 | 43 | 76 | –33 | 4 |

4 March 2016

| South Africa | 33–7 | Canada |

Sam Boyd Stadium, Las Vegas

4 March 2016

| United States | 19–12 | Wales |

Sam Boyd Stadium, Las Vegas

4 March 2016

| United States | 26–26 | Canada |

Sam Boyd Stadium, Las Vegas

4 March 2016

| South Africa | 36–7 | Wales |

Sam Boyd Stadium, Las Vegas

5 March 2016

| Canada | 10–17 | Wales |

Sam Boyd Stadium, Las Vegas

5 March 2016

| South Africa | 29–0 | United States |

Sam Boyd Stadium, Las Vegas

== Knockout stage ==
=== Shield ===
Quarter-finals
5 March 2016 – 16:03 – Sam Boyd Stadium, Whitney
Russia | 19
Canada | 10
5 March 2016 – 16:25 – Sam Boyd Stadium, Whitney
France | 21
England | 19
5 March 2016 – 16:47 – Sam Boyd Stadium, Whitney
Wales | 31
Portugal | 12
5 March 2016 – 17:09 – Sam Boyd Stadium, Whitney
Scotland | 17
Samoa | 12

Semi-finals
6 March 2016 – 10:30 – Sam Boyd Stadium, Whitney
Canada | 24
England | 7
6 March 2016 – 10:52 – Sam Boyd Stadium, Whitney
Portugal | 14
Samoa | 29

Final
6 March 2016 – 14:13 – Sam Boyd Stadium, Whitney
Canada | 12
Samoa | 24

=== Bowl ===
Quarter-finals
5 March 2016 – 16:03 – Sam Boyd Stadium, Whitney
Russia | 19
Canada | 10
5 March 2016 – 16:25 – Sam Boyd Stadium, Whitney
France | 21
England | 19
5 March 2016 – 16:47 – Sam Boyd Stadium, Whitney
Wales | 31
Portugal | 12
5 March 2016 – 17:09 – Sam Boyd Stadium, Whitney
Scotland | 17
Samoa | 12

Semi-finals
6 March 2016 – 11:14 – Sam Boyd Stadium, Whitney
Russia | 14
France | 15
6 March 2016 – 11:36 – Sam Boyd Stadium, Whitney
Wales | 21
Scotland | 14

Final
6 March 2016 – 14:38 – Sam Boyd Stadium, Whitney
France | 14
Wales | 28

=== Plate ===
Quarter-finals
5 March 2016 – 17:31 – Sam Boyd Stadium, Whitney
Kenya | 14
United States | 26
5 March 2016 – 17:53 – Sam Boyd Stadium, Whitney
Fiji | 43
Japan | 7
5 March 2016 – 18:15 – Sam Boyd Stadium, Whitney
South Africa | 14
New Zealand | 7
5 March 2016 – 18:37 – Sam Boyd Stadium, Whitney
Australia | 26
Argentina | 12

Semi-finals
6 March 2016 – 11:58 – Sam Boyd Stadium, Whitney
Kenya | 14
Japan | 19
6 March 2016 – 12:20 – Sam Boyd Stadium, Whitney
New Zealand | 24
Argentina | 19

Final
6 March 2016 – 15:03 – Sam Boyd Stadium, Whitney
Japan | 7
New Zealand | 27

=== Cup ===
Quarter-finals
5 March 2016 – 17:31 – Sam Boyd Stadium, Whitney
Kenya | 14
United States | 26
5 March 2016 – 17:53 – Sam Boyd Stadium, Whitney
Fiji | 43
Japan | 7
5 March 2016 – 18:15 – Sam Boyd Stadium, Whitney
South Africa | 14
New Zealand | 7
5 March 2016 – 18:37 – Sam Boyd Stadium, Whitney
Australia | 26
Argentina | 12

Semi-finals
6 March 2016 – 12:50 – Sam Boyd Stadium, Whitney
United States | 14
Fiji | 21
6 March 2016 – 13:12 – Sam Boyd Stadium, Whitney
South Africa | 12
Australia | 14

Final
6 March 2016 – 15:57 – Sam Boyd Stadium, Whitney
Fiji | 21
Australia | 15
Third place
6 March 2016 – 15:28 – Sam Boyd Stadium, Whitney
United States | 10
South Africa | 21
