= Russia national rugby sevens team =

Russia
- Union: Rugby Union of Russia (suspended)
- Nickname: Bears
- Coach: ️Vuyo Zangqa

World Cup Sevens
- Appearances: 4 (First in 2001)
- Best result: 9th (2001)

International medals

Men's rugby sevens

Representing Russia

European Championship
Gold medal – first place	2007	
Gold medal – first place	2009	
Gold medal – first place	2016	
Gold medal – first place	2017	
Silver medal – second place	2005	
Silver medal – second place	2006	
Bronze medal – third place	2010	
Bronze medal – third place	2013	
Bronze medal – third place	2018	
Bronze medal – third place	2021	

Universiade
Gold medal – first place	2013 Kazan	

The Russia national rugby sevens team competed in the World Rugby Sevens Series and the Rugby World Cup Sevens. After the 2022 Russian invasion of Ukraine, World Rugby and Rugby Europe suspended Russia from international and European continental rugby union competition. In addition, the Rugby Union of Russia was suspended from World Rugby and Rugby Europe.

== Rugby World Cup Sevens ==
Russia has competed at the 2001, 2005 and 2013 Rugby World Cup Sevens. The team won the Plate final in 2001 to end 9th, with wins over Kenya, Spain and Georgia. In 2005 they finished 11th, collecting wins over Kenya, Uruguay and Japan. As hosts of the 2013 World Cup, Russia claimed the Bowl final to take 17th place, after beating Spain, Uruguay and Japan.

== Sevens World Series ==
The first appearance of Russia at the Sevens World Series was at the 2011 Hong Kong Sevens. The team lost to Wales, tied versus Fiji and defeated West Indies to reach Plate quarterfinals, where they lost to France to take 13th place. At the 2006 London Sevens, Russia defeated Canada, Tunisia and Australia to reach the Bowl final, where they lost to Portugal to finish 10th. The team resulted ninth at the 2007 Hong Kong Sevens, after defeating Italy, Korea, Kenya and France.

At the 2009 South Africa Sevens, Russia tied Australia and defeated Zimbabwe and the United States to reach the Cup final, where they were defeated by Wales to result 10th. At the 2010 South Africa Sevens, they defeated Kenya, Zimbabwe and France to reach the Cup final, where they lost to Scotland to end tenth. At the 2011 Hong Kong Sevens, Russia defeated Kenya and Malaysia to advance to Cup quarterfinals. After losing to England and Australia, the team resulted seventh. At the 2012 Scotland Sevens they won the Cup final to result ninth, after beating United States, France and Spain.

Russia played the 2013 Sevens World Series qualifier at Hong Kong. They defeated Cook Islands, Mexico and Zimbabwe to win they group. Later they defeated Uruguay but lost to Zimbabwe in the semifinals. In the 2014 qualifier, they defeated Chile and Barbados and lost to Zimbabwe in the group phase. Next they defeated Uruguay to reach semifinal, where they were beaten by Japan.

=== Core status 2015 ===
Russia returned to the Sevens World Series qualifier at the 2015 Hong Kong Sevens, where they defeated South Korea and Tunisia and lost to Papua New Guinea in the group phase. Later they defeated Hong Kong, Papua New Guinea and Zimbabwe to win the tournament and claim core status for the 2015-16 Sevens World Series. In the 2015-16 Series, Russia finished second last and managed to maintain core status, ahead of last-placed Portugal who were relegated.

== Players ==
=== Current squad ===
Squad current through 8 July 2017

- Denis Simplikevich
- Ramil Gaysin
- Alexey Kapalin
- German Davydov
- Vladislav Sozonov
- Vitaly Zhivatov
- Vladislav Lazarenko
- Dmitry Perov
- Ivan Korotkov
- Ilya Babaev
- Mikhail Babaev
- Kevin Akuabu
- Vladimir Ostroushko
- Ivan Kotov
- Roman Roshchin
- Patris Peki
- Eduard Filatov
- Yuri Gostyuzhev

== Tournament history ==
=== World Cup Sevens record ===
Rugby World Cup Sevens Record
Year	Round	Position	Pld	W	L	D
(Scotland) 1993	Did not qualify					
(Hong Kong) 1997	Did not qualify					
(Argentina) 2001	Plate Winner	9th	8	5	3	0
(Hong Kong) 2005	Plate Semifinalist	11th	7	3	4	0
(United Arab Emirates) 2009	Did not qualify					
(Russia) 2013	Bowl Winner	17th	6	3	2	1
(United States) 2018		14th	5	2	3	0
(South Africa) 2022	Suspended from qualification					
Total	0 Titles	3/6	21	11	9	1

=== Summer Olympics record ===
Olympic Games
Year	Round	Position	Pld	W	L	D
(Brazil) 2016	Not Qualified					
(Japan) 2020	Not Qualified					
Total	0 Titles	0/0	0	0	0	0

=== Summer Universiade record ===
Summer Universiade
Year	Round	Pld	W	L	D
(Russia) 2013	1st place, gold medalist(s)	6	6	0	0
(Italy) 2019	4th place	5	2	0	3
Total	1 Title	11	8	0	3

=== European Sevens results ===
European Men's Sevens
Year	Position	Pld	W	L	D
(Spain) 2004	7th	6	3	3	0
(Russia) 2005	2nd place, silver medalist(s)	7	6	1	0
(Russia) 2006	2nd place, silver medalist(s)	7	5	2	0
(Russia) 2007	1st place, gold medalist(s)	5	1	3	1
(Germany) 2008	9th	5	1	3	1
(Germany) 2009	1st place, gold medalist(s)	6	5	1	0
(Russia) 2010	3rd place, bronze medalist(s)	7	6	1	0
2011	4th	26	18	8	2
2012	6th	20	14	5	1
2013	3rd place, bronze medalist(s)	12	10	2	0
2014	4th	24	13	11	0
2015	4th	24	15	8	1
2016	1st place, gold medalist(s)	18	11	5	2
2017	1st place, gold medalist(s)	24	20	4	0
2018	3rd place, bronze medalist(s)	24	18	6	0
2019	10th	10	5	5	0
2021	3rd place, bronze medalist(s)	11	6	5	0
2022	Suspended				
2023	Suspended				
2024	Suspended				
2025	Suspended				
2026	Suspended				
2027	Suspended				
Total	18/23	217	157	73	8

== See also ==
- World Sevens Series
- Rugby World Cup Sevens
