= Portugal national rugby sevens team =

Portugal
- Union: Federação Portuguesa de Rugby
- Nickname: The Lobos (The Wolves)
- Coach: Frederico Sousa
Team kit	Change kit

First international
- Portugal 6 - 24 Namibia (Catania, Italy; 1992-05-27)

Largest win
- Hungary 0 - 82 Portugal (Sopot, Poland; 2009-05-16)

Largest defeat
- Fiji 59 - 0 Portugal (Hong Kong, China; 1997-03-21)

World Cup Sevens
- Appearances: 6 (First in 1997)
- Best result: 10th place, 2005

The Portugal national rugby sevens team played for the first time in 1992, at the Catania Sevens, World Cup 1993 European Qualifier. The team plays in competitions such as the World Sevens Series, the European Sevens Grand Prix Series and the Rugby World Cup Sevens. Portugal has a record of eight European titles—in 2002, 2003, 2004, 2005, 2006, 2008, 2010 and 2011—although Portugal has not made the semifinals since 2012. Pedro Leal and Gonçalo Foro are two notable sevens players.

== World Rugby Sevens Series ==
Portugal were a core team at the World Rugby Sevens Series beginning with the 2012–13 season, but finished last among core teams in the 2015-16 World Series and were relegated. Since then, Portugal has not been in contention for promotion back to the World Series; their performance in the Rugby Europe Sevens Grand Prix has not been sufficiently strong for Portugal to reach the Hong Kong Sevens qualifying tournament.

Portugal competed at the 2024 World Rugby Sevens Challenger Series in Dubai. They finished tenth after losing to Uganda in the ninth place playoff. They finished tenth in the overall Challenger Series.

== Tournament history ==
=== Summer Olympics ===
Portugal has not qualified for the Summer Olympics.

=== Rugby World Cup Sevens ===
Rugby World Cup Sevens Record
Year	Round	Position	Pld	W	L	D
(Scotland) 1993	Did not qualify					
(Hong Kong) 1997	Bowl Quarterfinalist	21st	5	0	5	0
(Argentina) 2001	Bowl Finalist	18th	8	3	4	1
(Hong Kong) 2005	Plate Finalist	10th	8	4	4	0
(United Arab Emirates) 2009	Plate Semifinalist	11th	5	2	3	0
(Russia) 2013	Plate Quarterfinalist	13th	4	1	3	0
(United States) 2018	Did not qualify					
(South Africa) 2022	21st Place Final	22nd	4	1	3	0
Total	0 Titles	6/8	34	11	22	1

=== World Rugby Sevens Series ===
- 1999–00: did not compete
- 2000–01: 14th
- 2001–02: 16th
- 2002–03: 20th
- 2003–04: 15th
- 2004–05: 13th
- 2005–06: 13th
- 2006–07: 15th
- 2007–08: 14th
- 2008–09: 12th
- 2009–10: did not compete
- 2010–11: 13th
- 2011–12: 15th
- 2012–13: 14th
- 2013–14: 14th
- 2014–15: 14th
- 2015–16: 16th (relegated)
- 2016–17: did not compete

=== World Games ===
Games	Gold	Silver	Bronze
2001 Akita	Fiji	Australia	New Zealand
2005 Duisburg	Fiji	South Africa	Argentina
2009 Kaohsiung	Fiji	Portugal	South Africa

=== Sevens Grand Prix Series ===
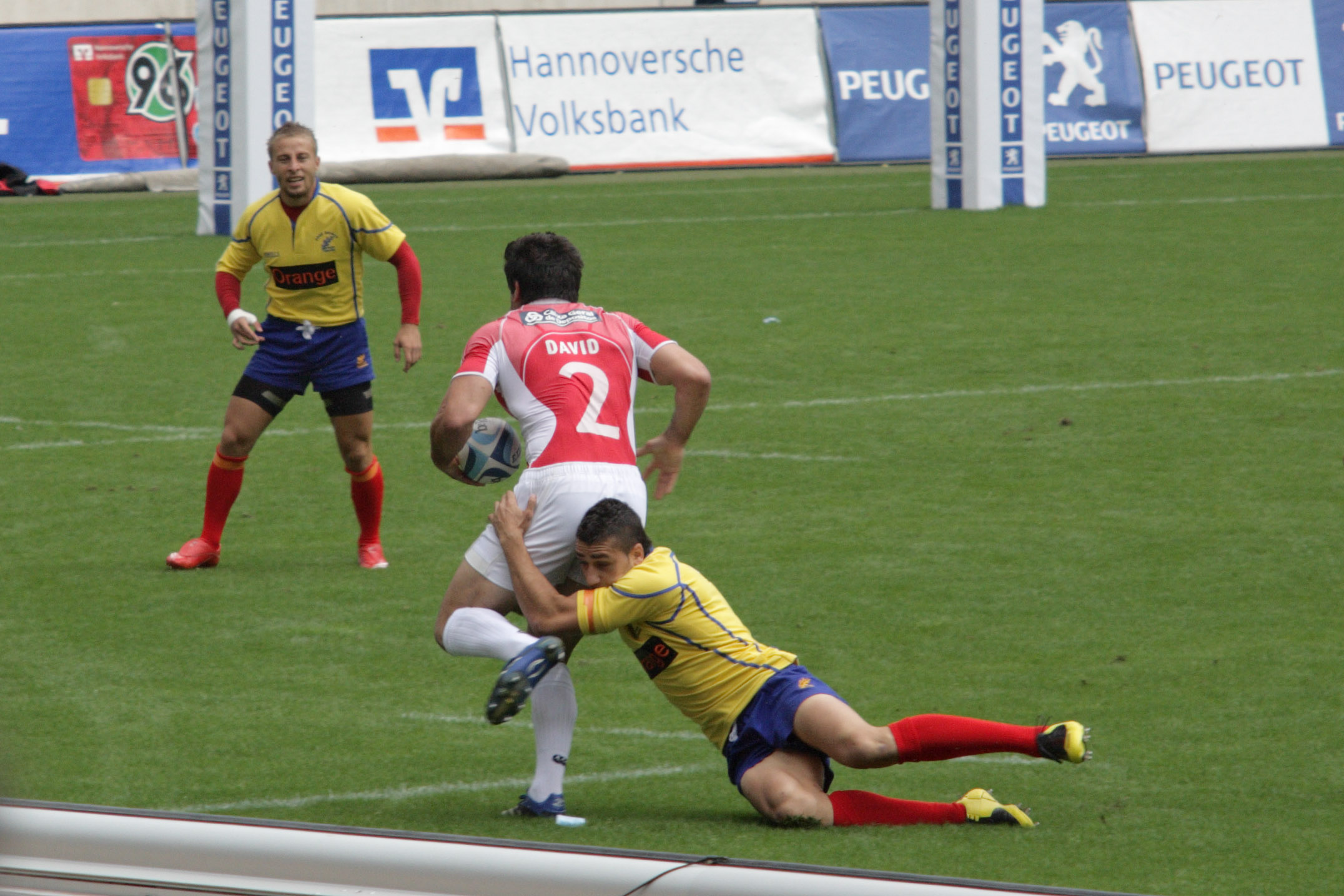
Portugal playing Romania, 2008

Grand Prix record
Year	Round	Position
(Germany) 2002	Champions	1st
(Germany) 2003	Champions	1st
(Spain) 2004	Champions	1st
(Russia) 2005	Champions	1st
(Russia) 2006	Champions	1st
(Germany) 2007	Sixth Place	6th
(Germany) 2008	Champions	1st
(Germany) 2009	Fifth Place	5th
(Russia) 2010	Champions	1st
(European Union) 2011	Champions	1st
(European Union) 2012	Runners-up	2nd
(France) (Romania) 2013	Fifth Place	5th
(European Union) 2014	Ninth Place	9th
(European Union) 2015	Sixth Place	6th
(European Union) 2016	Seventh Place	7th
(European Union) 2017	Eighth Place	8th
(European Union) 2018	Fifth Place	5th
(Russia) (Poland) 2019	Eighth Place	8th
(European Union) 2020	Not played	
(Russia) (Portugal) 2021	Sixth Place	6th
(Portugal) (Poland) 2022	Sixth Place	6th
(Portugal) (Germany) 2023	Fifth Place	5th
(Croatia) (Germany) 2024	Fourth Place	4th
(Croatia) (Germany) 2025	Sixth Place	6th
Total	8 Titles	22/22

== Players ==
Squad for the 2024 World Rugby Sevens Challenger Series in Dubai.

No.	Players
1	Duarte Moreira
6	Manuel Fati
7	Diogo Rodrigues
8	José Lima
9	Guilherme Vasconcelos
10	José Santos
11	João Vaz Antunes
12	Fábio Conceição
15	Antonio Monteiro
19	Vasco Silva
20	Frederico Couto
23	Vasco Correia

=== Notable players ===
- Adérito Esteves
- Pedro Leal

== See also ==
- Rugby World Cup Sevens

Awards
Preceded by Portugal national rugby union team	Portuguese Team of the Year; 2008	Succeeded by Portugal national under-23 triathlon team
