= 2014–15 United States national rugby sevens team season =

United States
2014–15 season

The United States national rugby sevens team had its best season to date in the Sevens World Series during the 2014–15 season under head coach Mike Friday. The U.S. finished sixth in the series.

The team capped off the season by going 6–0 to win the 2015 London Sevens, the first time the U.S. has won a World Series tournament.

== 2014–15 World Series ==
| Leg | Date | Finish | Record (W-L-D) | Leading Try Scorer | Leading Points Scorer | Dream Team selection |
|---|---|---|---|---|---|---|
| Australia | October 2014 | 9th | 4 – 2 | Zack Test (7) | Zack Test (35) | Zack Test |
| Dubai | December 2014 | 11th-T | 2 – 3 | Carlin Isles (5) | Carlin Isles (25) | — |
| South Africa | December 2014 | 5th | 4 – 2 | Carlin Isles (6) | Madison Hughes (41) | — |
| New Zealand | February 2015 | 7th-T | 2 – 3 | Perry Baker (4) | Madison Hughes (32) | Maka Unufe |
| United States | February 2015 | 4th | 3 – 2 – 1 | (Multiple) (3) | Madison Hughes (27) | Test, Barrett, Hughes |
| Hong Kong | March 2015 | 6th | 3 – 2 – 1 | Zack Test (6) | Madison Hughes (45) | Zack Test |
| Japan | April 2015 | 9th | 4 – 2 | Carlin Isles (7) | Carlin Isles (35) | Carlin Isles |
| Scotland | May 2015 | 4th | 3 – 3 | Maka Unufe (4) | Madison Hughes (26) | Maka Unufe |
| England | May 2015 | 1st | 6 – 0 | Madison Hughes (7) | Madison Hughes (65) | Barrett, Hughes |
| | | 6th | | Carlin Isles | Madison Hughes | Zack Test (3) |

=== 2015 London Sevens ===
The U.S. won the 2015 London Sevens, their first ever tournament win in the World Series. The U.S. defeated Australia 45–22 in the final, with Danny Barrett and Maka Unufe each scoring two tries. Danny Barrett and Madison Hughes were named to the tournament's seven-man Dream Team. Hughes scored seven tries throughout the tournament, tied for first in tries scored. Perry Baker scores six tries, tied for fourth overall.

2015 London Sevens final – U.S. starting lineup
| Player | Position |
|---|---|
| Danny Barrett | Forward |
| Andrew Durutalo | Forward |
| Matai Leuta | Forward |
| Folau Niua | Scrum-half |
| Madison Hughes | Fly-half |
| Maka Unufe | Center |
| Perry Baker | Wing |

== 2014–15 leading scorers ==
Tries
1. Carlin Isles (32)
2. Perry Baker (28)
3. Madison Hughes (24)
4. Zack Test (23)
5. Maka Unufe (22)
6. Danny Barrett (18)

Points

1. Madison Hughes (296)
2. Carlin Isles (160)
3. Perry Baker (140)
4. Zack Test (115)
5. Maka Unufe (110)

Updated: May 17, 2015

== Olympic qualifying ==
US Olympic Qualifying
| Olympics | Qualifying Date | Qualifying Venue | USA Record | Position |
|---|---|---|---|---|
| 2016 | June 2015 | Raleigh, U.S. | 5–0 | 1st |

Rugby returned to the Summer Olympics at the 2016 Olympics in Rio de Janeiro, where the United States attempted to defend its title. The U.S. defeated Canada 21–5 in the final of the 2015 NACRA Men's Sevens Championships to qualify for the 2016 Olympics.

=== Pool A ===
| Teams | Pld | W | D | L | PF | PA | +/− | Pts |
|---|---|---|---|---|---|---|---|---|
| United States | 3 | 3 | 0 | 0 | 144 | 5 | +139 | 9 |
| Mexico | 3 | 2 | 0 | 1 | 57 | 55 | +2 | 6 |
| Jamaica | 3 | 1 | 0 | 2 | 38 | 90 | –52 | 3 |
| Barbados | 3 | 0 | 0 | 3 | 26 | 115 | –89 | 0 |

13 June 2015
15:44

| United States | 54–0 | Barbados |

WakeMed Soccer Park, Cary

13 June 2015
18:06

| United States | 50–0 | Mexico |

WakeMed Soccer Park, Cary

14 June 2015
9:00

| United States | 40–5 | Jamaica |

WakeMed Soccer Park, Cary

=== Semifinals ===
Semi-finals
14 June 2015 - 11:45 - WakeMed Soccer Park, Cary
United States | 60
Cayman Islands | 0
14 June 2015 - 12:07 - WakeMed Soccer Park, Cary
Canada | 34
Mexico | 0

Final
14 June 2015 - 17:34 - WakeMed Soccer Park, Cary
United States | 21
Canada | 5

== 2015 Pan Am Games ==
Group A

| Team | Pld | W | D | L | PF | PA | PD | Pts | Qualification |
|---|---|---|---|---|---|---|---|---|---|
| United States | 3 | 3 | 0 | 0 | 126 | 7 | +119 | 9 | Qualified for the quarterfinals |
| Uruguay | 3 | 2 | 0 | 1 | 54 | 69 | −15 | 7 | Qualified for the quarterfinals |
| Chile | 3 | 1 | 0 | 2 | 62 | 46 | +16 | 5 | Qualified for the quarterfinals |
| Mexico | 3 | 0 | 0 | 3 | 0 | 120 | −120 | 3 | Qualified for the quarterfinals |

11 July 2015
11:11

| United States | 26–7 | Chile |
| | Report |

Exhibition Stadium, Toronto

11 July 2015
16:05

| United States | 46–0 | Mexico |
| | Report |

Exhibition Stadium, Toronto

11 July 2015
19:11

| United States | 52–0 | Uruguay |
| | Report |

Exhibition Stadium, Toronto

Medal round

Semifinals
July 12 — Toronto
United States | 19
Canada | 26
July 12 — Toronto
Argentina | 43
Uruguay | 7

Final
July 12 — Toronto
Argentina | 19
Canada | 22
Third place
July 12 — Toronto
United States | 40
Uruguay | 12

=== Quarterfinals ===
12 July 2015
11:10

| United States | 31–0 | Guyana |
| | Report |

Exhibition Stadium, Toronto

=== Semifinals ===
12 July 2015
16:49

| United States | 19–26 | Canada |
| | Report |

Exhibition Stadium, Toronto

=== Bronze medal match ===
12 July 2015
19:34

| (bronze) United States | 40–12 | Uruguay |
| | Report |

Exhibition Stadium, Toronto
