= 2018–19 United States national rugby sevens team season =

United States
2018–19 season

The United States national rugby sevens team got off to a strong start in the 2018–19 World Rugby Sevens Series. The team reached the finals in Dubai, South Africa, New Zealand, and Australia, the first time the U.S. had reached four consecutive finals and was ranked joint first in the overall Series after the first four legs. In the fifth leg, the U.S. won beating Samoa 27–0. This was the U.S.’s second straight USA Sevens win, giving them sole possession of first place in the Sevens World Series. The U.S. remained in first place for several more tournaments, but consecutive semifinal losses to Fiji in the last two tournaments in London and Paris meant that Fiji won the Series with the U.S. finishing second. The U.S. overall had its best season ever — the second-place finish beating their previous best of fifth. Additionally, qualifying for five consecutive tournament finals as well as reaching the semifinals in all ten tournaments were U.S. records. Carlin Isles scored 52 tries, ranked first overall among all players.

== Standings ==
The following shows the standings for the 2018–19 series for the 15 core teams. The top four finish by the U.S. qualified the team for the 2020 Olympics.

2018–19 World Rugby Sevens Series XX
Pos	Event Team	Dubai	Cape Town	Hamilton	Sydney	Las Vegas	Vancouver	Hong Kong	Singapore	London	Paris	Points total
1	Fiji	13	22	22	15	12	17	22	19	22	22	186
2	United States	19	19	19	19	22	15	17	15	17	15	177
3	New Zealand	22	15	17	22	17	13	12	12	13	19	162
4	South Africa	12	17	15	13	10	22	10	22	10	17	148
5	England	17	13	8	17	13	12	10	17	2	5	114
6	Samoa	8	7	12	3	19	10	15	13	8	12	107
7	Australia	15	10	10	12	10	8	5	10	19	5	104
8	France	7	5	2	10	1	19	19	8	15	13	99
9	Argentina	10	8	5	8	15	10	13	10	5	10	94
10	Scotland	10	10	13	1	8	5	8	7	7	3	72
11	Canada	5	5	10	5	3	7	1	5	10	8	59
12	Spain	5	12	5	10	7	3	3	2	1	1	49
13	Kenya	1	3	7	1	5	1	5	3	1	10	37
14	Wales	3	2	1	5	2	5	2	5	5	1	31
15	Japan	2	1	1	7	1	2	7	1	3	2	27

Source: World Rugby

Legend
No colour	Core team in 2018–19 and re-qualified as a core team for the 2019–20 World Rugby Sevens Series
Pink	Relegated as the lowest placed core team at the end of the 2018–19 series
Qualified to the 2020 Olympic Sevens as one of the four highest placed eligible teams from the 2018–19 series.

== World Series results by tournament ==
2018–19 Season
Leg	Date	Finish	Record (W-L-D)	Pts Diff	Most tries	Most points	Dream Team selection
Dubai	Nov–Dec 2018	2nd	4–2	+34	Perry Baker (6)	Perry Baker (30)	---
South Africa	December 2018	2nd	5–1	+104	Stephen Tomasin (5)	Stephen Tomasin (43)	Hughes & Barrett
New Zealand	January 2019	2nd	5–1	+31	Carlin Isles (7)	Madison Hughes (39)	Pinkelman, Niua, & Isles
Sydney	February 2019	2nd	5–1	+89	Isles & Williams (5)	Madison Hughes (35)	Tomasin, Hughes
United States	March 2019	1st	5–1	+74	Carlin Isles (8)	Carlin Isles (40)	Isles, Iosefo, Tomasin, Pinkelman
Canada	March 2019	4th	3–3	–8	Carlin Isles (6)	Madison Hughes (32)	Stephen Tomasin
Hong Kong	April 2019	3rd	3–3	+33	Carlin Isles (9)	Carlin Isles (45)	Carlin Isles
Singapore	April 2019	4th	4–2	+68	(multiple) (3)	Madison Hughes (27)	—
England	May 2019	3rd	5–1	+53	Perry Baker (5)	Perry Baker (25)	Stephen Tomasin
France	June 2019	4th	4–2	+33	Carlin Isles (5)	Madison Hughes (36)	Madison Hughes
Totals		2nd			Carlin Isles (52)	Madison Hughes (299)	Stephen Tomasin (4)

== U.S. vs Fiji ==
Fiji and the U.S. were the top two teams at the end of the Series and during the final rounds of the Series. The teams met during seven of the ten Series tournaments. All their matchups were during the knockout rounds; they never met during pool play. The U.S. won the first matchup, and Fiji winning all of the other six matches.

2018–19 U.S. vs Fiji
Leg	Round	Result
Dubai	Quarterfinal	Win: 24–12
South Africa	Final	Loss: 15–29
New Zealand	Final	Loss: 0–38
Australia	—	—
United States	—	—
Canada	Third/Fourth	Loss: 14–24
Hong Kong	Semifinal	Loss: 19–28
Singapore	—	—
England	Semifinal	Loss: 10–17
France	Semifinal	Loss: 14–33

== Player season statistics ==
The following table shows the leading players for the U.S. at the conclusion of the 2018–19 World Rugby Sevens Series. Carlin Isles led all players on the Series with 52 tries and 48 clean breaks. Madison Hughes ranked second in the Series with 299 points. Ben Pinkelman ranked third with 191 carries. Stephen Tomasin ranked fifth with 101 tackles.

Leading U.S. players (2018–19 Series)
Player	Position	Matches	Tackles	Tries
Stephen Tomasin	Forward	60	101	29
Ben Pinkelman	Forward	60	84	16
Madison Hughes	Halfback	59	89	20
Carlin Isles	Back	55	49	52
Folau Niua	Halfback	55	37	8
Martin Iosefo	Back	53	49	16
Matai Leuta	Forward	52	48	10
Kevon Williams	Halfback	52	35	18
Maceo Brown	Back	47	42	6
Brett Thompson	Forward	43	37	6
Danny Barrett	Forward	39	38	12
Perry Baker	Back	25	21	16

Source: World Rugby website.

== Player and coach Series awards ==
Three U.S. players made the seven-man World Series Dream Team:

Player	Position
Stephen Tomasin	Forward
Ben Pinkelman	Forward
Folau Niua	Halfback

2018–19 Coach of the World Series: Mike Friday, U.S. head coach.

== 2019 USA Sevens ==
The United States won the 2019 USA Sevens by beating Samoa 27–0 in the final. This was the second time that the United States won its home tournament (2018 was the first). USA's Ben Pinkelman was named Player of the Final.

2019 USA Sevens final:
U.S. starting lineup

FW Stephen Tomasin	FW Ben Pinkelman	FW Matai Leuta
SH Madison Hughes
FH Folau Niua
CR Martin Iosefo
WG Carlin Isles

- Substitutes: Brett Thompson, Maceo Brown, Kevon Williams, Marcus Tupuola, and Ben Broselle.
- Unavailable due to injury: Danny Barrett, Perry Baker
