= Maceo Brown =

USA 7s Olympic rugby player

- Born: September 1, 1995 (age 31)
- Height: 1.85 m (6 ft 1 in)
- Weight: 86 kg (190 lb)

Rugby union career
- Position(s): Center (7s), Forward (7s)
National sevens team
Years	Team	Comps
2018–present	USA 7s	
Medal record
Men's rugby sevens
Representing the United States
Pan American Games
Bronze medal – third place	2019 Lima	Team competition

Maceo Brown (born September 1, 1995) is an American rugby union player. He plays for the United States national rugby sevens team as a center and as a forward.

Brown debuted for the U.S. national team at the 2018 Dubai Sevens. He played regularly as a substitute for the U.S. throughout the 2018–19 season – including at the 2019 USA Sevens tournament, which the U.S. won – in the absence of squad regular Maka Unufe, who was out for the season.

In his youth, Brown was a multi-sport athlete at Corona del Sol High School. He played American football and basketball, and started playing rugby at the age of 16. Brown attended college at Grand Canyon University where he played for the school's rugby team.

Brown was selected for the USA Eagles sevens squad for the 2022 Rugby World Cup Sevens in Cape Town.
