= Nick Edwards =

US international rugby union player

- Born: February 24, 1984 (age 42) Sydney, Australia
- Height: 6 ft 2 in (1.88 m)
- Weight: 95 kg (209 lb; 14 st 13 lb)

Rugby union career
- Position: Wing
International career
Years	Team	Apps	(Points)
2016	United States	1	(5)
National sevens team
Years	Team		Comps
2009–2016	United States 7s		29
- Correct as of 25 December 2020

Nick Edwards (born February 24, 1984) is an Australian-born American former rugby union player. He played for the USA Eagles sevens team and made his debut in 2009.

== Career ==
In 2013, Edwards along with 16 other players signed residency contracts with USA Rugby. He was in the New York Sevens squad that played at the 2013 World Club 7s that was held at the Twickenham Stadium. He was included in the squad for the 2013 Rugby World Cup Sevens in Moscow. He was later named in the squad for the 2013 Gold Coast and Dubai Sevens.

Edwards captained the Eagles at the 2014 USA Sevens in Las Vegas. He played at the 2014 Gold Coast Sevens at the beginning of the 2014–15 Sevens World Series but missed out on selection for the 2014 Dubai and South African Sevens before earning his way back into the squad for the 2015 Wellington Sevens.

At the 2015 Hong Kong Sevens the US sevens team drew with England to win their pool. Their loss to Samoa in the Cup quarter-finals saw them into the Plate semis, they beat Argentina but lost to Australia in the finals. Edwards and the Eagles won the Bowl finals at the Japan Sevens.
