= Maka Unufe =

American rugby union player

Personal information
- Full name: Kisi Keomaka Unufe
- Born: September 28, 1991 (age 35) Chula Vista, California, U.S.
- Home town: Provo, Utah, U.S.
- Height: 6 ft 1 in (185 cm)
- Weight: 210 lb (95 kg)

Rugby union career
- Position: Center
Amateur team(s)
Years	Team	Apps	(Points)
2011	Utah Warriors		
Senior career
Years	Team	Apps	(Points)
2022	Houston SaberCats	7	(5)
- Correct as of December 21, 2021
National sevens team
Years	Team		Comps
2011–	United States		255 (367)
- Correct as of March 22, 2024

Kisi Keomaka "Maka" Unufe (born September 28, 1991) is an American rugby union player. He has played over a decade with the United States national rugby sevens team. He also played for the Houston SaberCats of Major League Rugby (MLR) as a center.

== Early years ==
Unufe is from Provo, Utah, United States. Unufe previously played American football as a wide receiver at Provo High School. Unufe starred for the Utah Warriors at the Club 7s Nationals in August 2011, earning a nomination to the All-Tournament team. He was then selected to play at the National All-Star Championships.

== Club career ==
Unufe signed with the Houston SaberCats for the 2022 Major League Rugby season.

== U.S. national rugby sevens team ==
Although only 19 years old at the time, Unufe made his international debut with the United States national team playing as a wing in the 2011 Pan American games against Chile in October 2011, scoring a try in his first game. He was the team's top try scorer at the Pan Am games with 5 tries, helping the U.S. national team win a Bronze medal. Following the tournament, U.S. national team head coach Al Caravelli described Unufe as "phenomenal" and "a star in the making." In recognition of Unufe's rapid rise, Rugby Mag named Unufe the 2011 Men's Breakout Player of the Year, and This Is American Rugby named Unufe the 2011 Youth Player of the Year. Unufe made his Sevens World Series debut at the 2012 Wellington Sevens.

With the arrival of speedsters Carlin Isles and Perry Baker, Unufe was moved to center. Unufe was named to World Rugby's Dream Team for the 2015 Wellington Sevens tournament, due to his "strong defensive plays and hard runs." Unufe played for the U.S. at the 2016 Summer Olympics, where the U.S. finished in ninth place. Unufe was a key piece of the U.S. comeback at the 2017 USA Sevens from a 0–19 deficit against Argentina to win 21–19. Unufe missed the entire 2018–19 season due to a suspension for a banned substance that had been contained in a diet supplement he had taken.

Unufe competed for the United States at the 2022 Rugby World Cup Sevens in Cape Town. He competed for the United States at the 2024 Summer Olympics in Paris.

== See also ==
- United States national rugby sevens team
- Rugby sevens at the Pan American Games
