= Matt Hawkins (rugby union) =

US international rugby union player

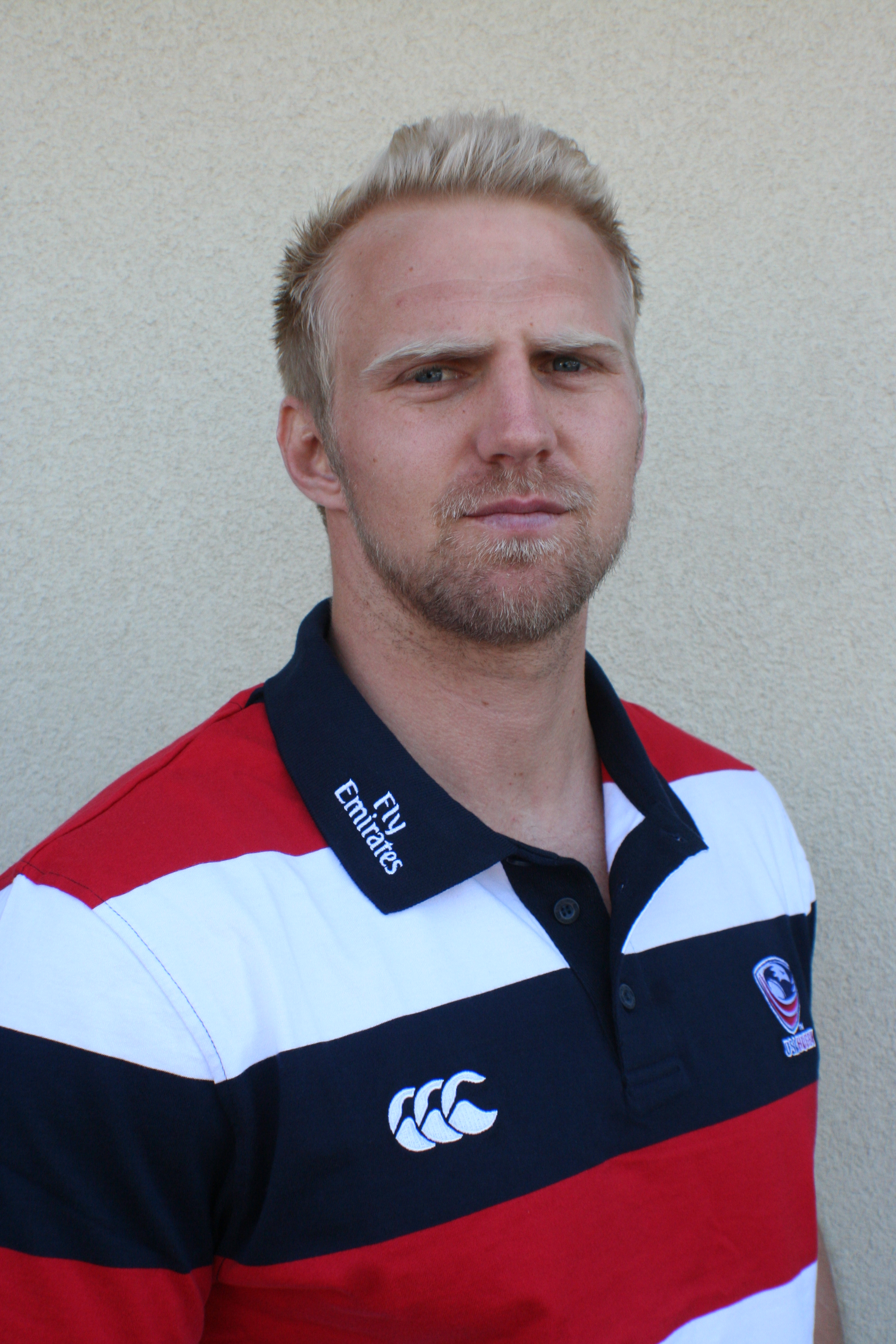
- Born: Matthew Hawkins; 30 March 1983 (age 43) Durban, South Africa
- Height: 1.88 m (6 ft 2 in)
- Weight: 109 kg (240 lb)

Rugby union career
- Position: Flank
Amateur team(s)
Years	Team	Apps	(Points)
2006	OMBAC		
2012	OPSB		
International career
Years	Team	Apps	(Points)
2010	United States	1	(0)
- Correct as of 16 February 2014
National sevens team
Years	Team		Comps
2008–13	United States 7s		37 (280) 56t
- Correct as of 16 February 2014
Coaching career
- Years: Team
- 2009: Belmont Shore RFC
- –: San Diego State
- –: SEREVI Rugby
- –: Torrey Pines High School Rugby
- –: San Diego Mustangs

Matthew Hawkins (born 30 March 1983) is a South African born, former American rugby union player and former coach of the United States sevens team.

== Playing career ==
Hawkins played loose forward for the Old Mission Beach Athletic Club when he first arrived in the U.S., and helped the team win the 2006 national Super League title.

In 2007 Hawkins was selected to the United States national rugby sevens team pool. He made his first appearance for the USA Eagles at the 2008 New Zealand and USA stops of the World Rugby Sevens Series. Hawkins' achievements on the Sevens circuit include the team making the cup semi-finals in the 2009 USA Sevens and reaching the final of the 2010 Adelaide Sevens. Hawkins captained the sevens team in the 2009/2010 and 2010/2011 seasons. He was at the time of his retirement among the most capped Sevens Eagles of all time.

In fifteens, in 2010 he was selected to the USA 15's Churchill Cup squad and won his first cap against Russia.

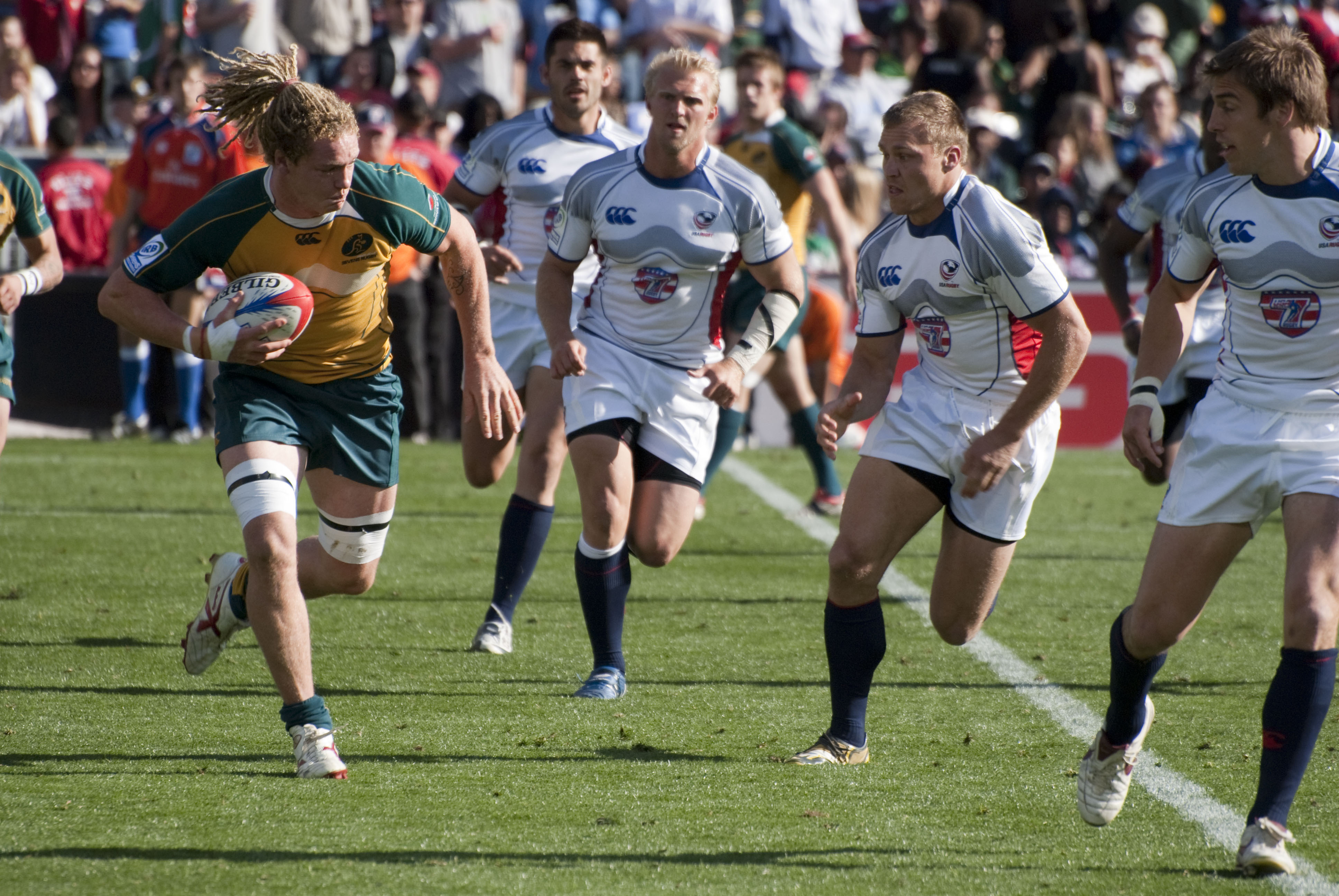
Hawkins, pictured center, playing with the USA Sevens team in 2009

== Coaching career ==
Hawkins is a coach at Serevi Rugby. Hawkins has devoted his time outside of playing rugby to the development of rugby with in the US. Hawkins has been involved with youth rugby and as a coach of many different levels of rugby for many years. Hawkins is dedicated to developing talent at the youth rugby level and Collegiate level in America. Hawkins has been quoted as saying that his ultimate goal is to help the USA Men's and Women's Sevens Team reach gold at the Olympic Games.

Hawkins started coaching the Belmont Sevens team with James Walker in 2009 after sustaining a major injury that put him out of playing for many months. That year he coached Belmont to claim their first National Sevens Title. In 2010 Hawkins again stepped in to coach the Belmont Sevens team and he played. That year Belmont qualified both their A and B side to the National Sevens Championships. That year Belmont fell at the last hurdle, finishing second. In 2011 Hawkins returned again to just coach the Belmont Shore Sevens team and they went on to win the National Championships for a second time in three years.

Hawkins has been involved with youth rugby in the States, namely the Coastal Dragons Youth Rugby Team which calls Encinitas its home base. The Coastal Dragons are a youth rugby program that has 150 registered members and is constantly growing and is spreading the game of Rugby. Hawkins also contracted at two high school rugby teams, Torrey Pines High School in San Diego, CA and La Costa Canyon High School in San Diego, CA. Although these two schools are big rivals, he helped out at both ends.

On 1 August 2013, USA Rugby announced that Hawkins would take over as head coach of the Men's Sevens National Team, after Alexander Magleby's decision to step down. The US fared poorly under Hawkins, however, finishing a disappointing 13th on the World Series, and Hawkins was removed at the end of the 2013–14 season.
