= Matai Leuta =

American rugby union coach and former player (born 1990)

- Leuta in San Jose, California, in 2017
- Full name: Mataiyasi Leuta
- Born: July 20, 1990 (age 36) Marina, California, U.S.
- Height: 6 ft 3 in (191 cm)
- Weight: 235 lb (107 kg)

Rugby union career
- Position(s): Wing (fifteens); Forward (sevens)
Senior career
| Years | Team | Apps | (Points) |
| 2022 | Houston SaberCats | 17 | (12) |
| 2023 | Chicago Hounds | 7 | (10) |
| 2024 | San Diego Legion | 2 | (0) |
- Correct as of October 3, 2026
International career
| Years | Team | Apps | (Points) |
| 2016–2017 | United States | 3 | |
- Correct as of October 3, 2026
National sevens team
| Years | Team | | Comps |
| 2015–2024 | United States | | 2018 Rugby World Cup Sevens; 2020 Olympics; 2024 Olympics |
- Correct as of October 3, 2026
Coaching career
- Years: Team
- 2026–: Harvard Crimson women (assistant)

Mataiyasi "Matai" Leuta (/məˈtaɪ liˈuːtə/ mə-TY lee-OO-tə; born July 20, 1990) is an American rugby union coach and former player. He is an assistant coach for the Harvard Crimson women's rugby team.

A wing in fifteens who played as a forward in sevens, Leuta represented the United States in rugby sevens from 2015 to 2024, including the 2020 and 2024 Summer Olympics and the 2018 Rugby World Cup Sevens. He played 215 matches across 44 World Rugby Sevens Series tournaments, scoring 31 tries. He earned three caps for the United States fifteens team in 2016 and 2017, and played in Major League Rugby for the Houston SaberCats, Chicago Hounds, and San Diego Legion. In Premier Rugby Sevens he won championships with the SoCal Loggerheads in 2022 and 2023.

== Early life ==
Leuta was born in Marina, California, and moved to Fiji with his family at about age six. He grew up in Kinoya, a suburb of Nasinu near Suva, attended the Assemblies of God school there, and learned rugby in Fiji. His family has ancestral ties to the village of Salia on Nayau in the Lau Islands.

He returned to California at 16 and attended Seaside High School in Seaside, California, graduating in 2008. He played rugby as a youth and, in his senior year, helped the Seaside Spartans win the Monterey Bay League in American football.

Leuta played club rugby for the Monterey Beachdogs while attending Monterey Peninsula College, later for the San Jose Seahawks, and for California State University, Monterey Bay, which competed in the National Small College Rugby Organization (NSCRO). In 2013 he decided to pursue rugby professionally and changed his diet and training to lose weight.

== Playing career ==
=== Club career ===
==== Premier Rugby Sevens ====
Leuta played in Premier Rugby Sevens (PR7s) from its inaugural season in 2021. He was co-captain of the New York Locals at the league's first event in Memphis on October 9, 2021, where the Locals took third place after beating the Loonies 24–10 in the bronze medal match; Leuta scored two tries on the day.

He joined the SoCal Loggerheads for the three-stop 2022 circuit. After falling short at the first two tournaments in San Jose and Washington, D.C., the Loggerheads came from behind to win the 2022 men's PR7s championship in Austin at Q2 Stadium.

Leuta remained with the Loggerheads in 2023 and helped the team win its second straight PR7s championship. He missed the first stop in Minneapolis but joined the team for the Western Conference Finals at PayPal Park in San Jose, where the Loggerheads beat the Golden State Retrievers 17–15 and the Rocky Mountain Experts 15–12 to qualify for the championship in Washington, D.C. At the championship at Audi Field, the Loggerheads beat the Experts 21–14 and then the Pittsburgh Steeltoes 10–5 in the final. Leuta finished the season with one try, five tackles, and one steal.

In 2023 he also joined the San Clemente Rhinos for the Rugby Tens Championship in South Africa, where the team finished runner-up in the men's division.

==== Major League Rugby ====
Leuta signed with the Houston SaberCats of Major League Rugby ahead of the 2022 season, making 17 appearances and scoring two tries. He joined the Chicago Hounds in April 2023 for the club's inaugural season, making seven appearances (six starts) and scoring two tries. On October 29, 2023, the San Diego Legion announced his signing for the 2024 season.

==== Coral Coast Sevens ====
In January 2025, Leuta played competitive rugby in Fiji for the first time as a member of Mike Friday's Select 7s invitational side at the Coral Coast Sevens at Lawaqa Park in Sigatoka.

=== International career ===
==== Sevens ====
Leuta was discovered in January 2015 at a USA Rugby recruitment camp at the Olympic Training Center in Chula Vista, California, and was one of two players invited into residency with the national sevens program. He made his World Rugby Sevens Series debut at the 2015 Hong Kong Sevens. He scored his first Series try at the 2015 Japan Sevens against Portugal, catching the ball from the U.S. kickoff and breaking through two tacklers. At the 2015 London Sevens he started the final as the United States beat Australia 45–22 for its first ever Series tournament win.

A foot injury kept him out of the U.S. team for the 2016 Rio Olympics. He played at the 2018 Rugby World Cup Sevens in San Francisco, where the United States finished sixth, and was part of the U.S. sides that won the 2018 USA Sevens and 2019 USA Sevens in Las Vegas.

Leuta was selected for the 2020 Summer Olympics in Tokyo, held in 2021, where the United States finished sixth. He left the USA sevens residency program in December 2021 to play fifteens in Major League Rugby, then returned to the national sevens team for the 2024 Summer Olympics in Paris, where the United States finished eighth.

In total, Leuta played 215 Series matches in 44 tournaments and scored 31 tries.

==== Fifteens ====
Leuta started all three matches for the USA Selects at the 2016 Americas Pacific Challenge. He made his test debut for the United States as a replacement against Romania in Bucharest on November 12, 2016, becoming Eagle number 501, and started tests against Georgia on June 17, 2017 and Canada on June 24, 2017.

== Coaching career ==
Leuta joined the Harvard Crimson women's rugby program as an assistant coach during the 2026 spring sevens season. In his first season, Harvard won the Ivy League sevens title and finished third at the CRAA 7s National Championships. He entered his second season with the program in 2026–27.

Before Harvard, Leuta worked as a high performance coach with Rugby Tens, coached at Rhinos Rugby Academy, and served as a technical skills coach for the USA Falcons and the USA under-18 team.

== Honours ==
United States sevens

- World Rugby Sevens Series tournament winner: 2015 London Sevens, 2018 USA Sevens, 2019 USA Sevens
- 2020 Summer Olympics: sixth place
- 2024 Summer Olympics: eighth place
- 2018 Rugby World Cup Sevens: sixth place

SoCal Loggerheads

- Premier Rugby Sevens champion: 2022, 2023
