= Martin Iosefo =

American rugby union player (born 1990)

- Born: 13 January 1990 (age 36) Hawaii, U.S.
- Height: 1.85 m (6 ft 1 in)
- Weight: 104 kg (229 lb)
- University: University of Montana

Rugby union career
- Current team: Seattle Seawolves
Amateur team(s)
Years	Team	Apps	(Points)
2015	Denver		
Senior career
Years	Team	Apps	(Points)
2022	Seattle Seawolves	8	(5)
- Correct as of 5 April 2022
International career
Years	Team	Apps	(Points)
2016–2019	United States	9	(10)
- Correct as of 13 December 2021
National sevens team
Years	Team		Comps
2014–2021	United States		53
- Correct as of 13 December 2021

Martin Iosefo (born January 13, 1990) is an American rugby union player who currently plays for the Seattle Seawolves in Major League Rugby (MLR). He previously played several seasons with the United States national rugby sevens team.

== Early life ==
Iosefo grew up in Wahiawa on the island of Oahu in Hawaii where he learned to play rugby. Between the ages of 4 and 15 he lived in Samoa with his brother and father.

After finishing Leilehua High School in Wahiawa, he went to the University of Montana to play wide receiver in American football as a walk-on.

Iosefo started playing rugby competitively while in Missoula, Montana with the University of Montana Jesters. Iosefo played with the Men's Collegiate All-Americans at the 2014 Serevi RugbyTown Sevens. Iosefo played with the Denver Barbarians at the 2015 Club 7s Nationals.

Iosefo has been recognized for his size and athleticism, as well as for his hard hits at defense as a centre.

== U.S. national rugby sevens team ==
Iosefo debuted with the U.S. national rugby sevens team at the 2014 Dubai Sevens. Iosefo missed the 2015 Hong Kong Sevens and the 2015 Japan Sevens due to school commitments, but rejoined the team for the 2015 London Sevens.

Iosefo was part of the U.S. team that won bronze at the 2015 Pan Am Games. Iosefo also played for the U.S. at the 2015 NACRA Sevens where the United States beat Canada in the final 21–5 to qualify for the 2016 Summer Olympics.

Iosefo made the "dream team" for the 2016 Canada Sevens. At the 2016 London Sevens, Iosefo scored a try 11 seconds into the match against Fiji, one of the fastest tries in the World Series. Iosefo played for the U.S. at the 2016 Summer Olympics in Rio, where the team finished in ninth place.

=== Career statistics ===
As of the end of 2021, Iosefo was ranked among the top U.S. players for statistics on the World Rugby Sevens Series:

Sevens Series statistics
Category	Number	U.S. Rank	Ref	Notes
Runs	666	2		
Points	403	10		
Clean breaks	129	4		
Matches	278	7		
Tackles	294	6		
Tries	79	8		
