= Japan Sevens =

Rugby sevens tournament in Tokyo, Japan

Tokyo Sevens
- Sport: Rugby sevens
- First season: 1993
- No. of teams: 16
- Most recent champion: England (2015)
- Most titles: Fiji (5 times)

The Japan Sevens, also known as the Tokyo Sevens, is an annual rugby sevens tournament held at the Chichibunomiya Rugby Stadium in Tokyo, Japan. It was a part of the Sevens World Series from 2000 to 2001 and from 2012 to 2015.

== History ==
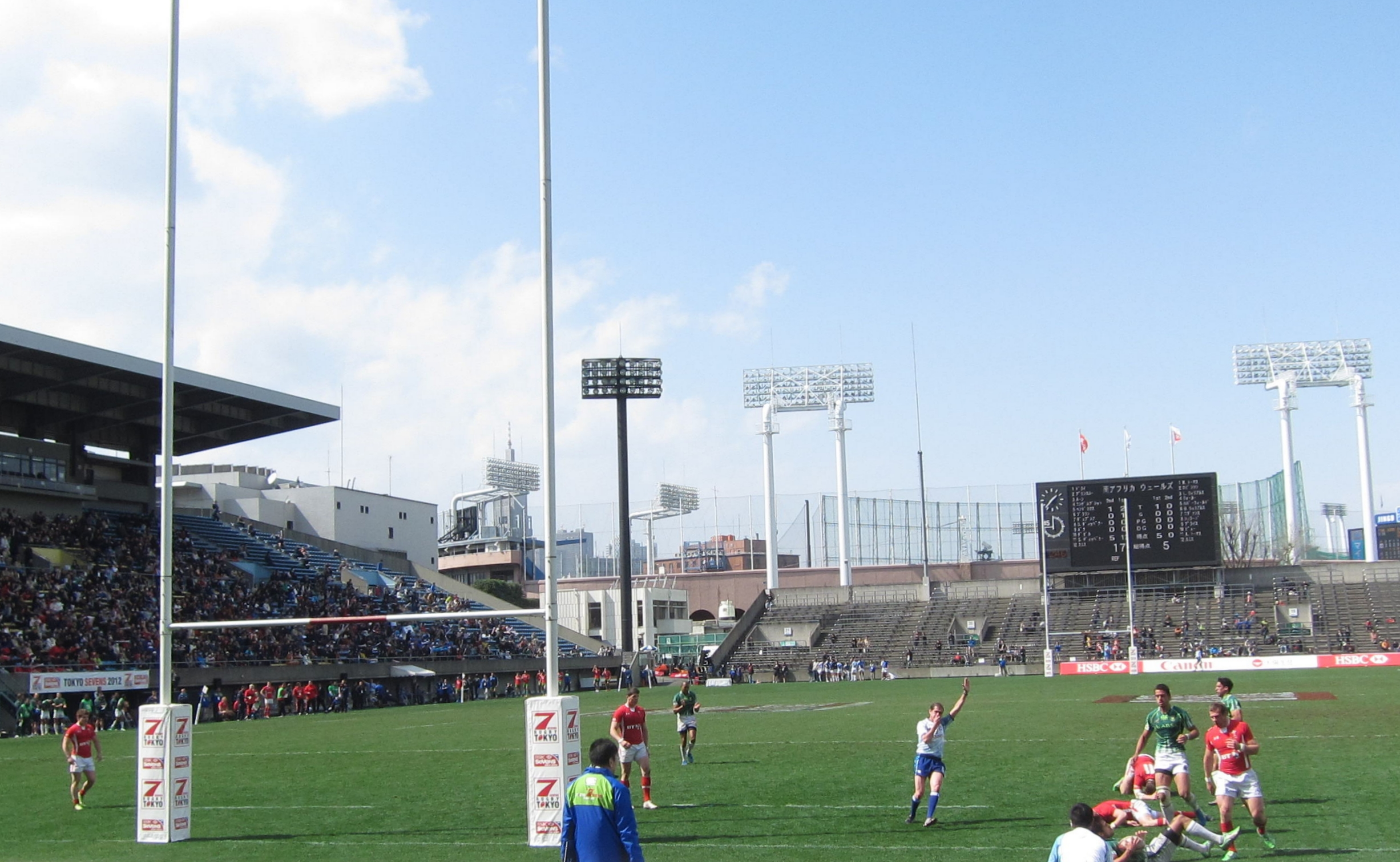
South Africa vs Wales at the 2012 Tokyo Sevens

The first Tokyo Sevens was held in 1993, with a number of Japan's top university teams and company teams competing. Meiji University won the cup in the first year, and Suntory the following year, 1994.

In 1995, the international tournament was added. Initially sponsored as the Canterbury Japan International Sevens by sportswear manufacturer Canterbury of New Zealand, the national teams from Fiji and New Zealand were the finalists on all five occasions, with Fiji winning the first three cups and New Zealand the next two.

The international tournament was incorporated into IRB Sevens World Series as the Tokyo International Sevens in 2000 and 2001. A further cup win each to Fiji and New Zealand, respectively, was recorded in those two years. The Tokyo Sevens was then effectively replaced by the Singapore Sevens on the world circuit for the 2002 season.

A decade passed before Tokyo was included in the World Sevens Series again, hosting four events from 2012 to 2015. A preparatory international sevens tournament had been planned for Tokyo in 2011 but this had to be cancelled due to the earthquake and tsunami aftermath that year.

== Results ==
Year		Venue	Cup final			Placings			Refs
		Tokyo 7s	Winner	Score	Runner-up	Cup semi-finalists		Plate	
III	1995	Chichibu Stadium	Fiji	47–26	New Zealand	Japan	South Korea	Chinese Taipei	
IV	1996	Chichibu Stadium	Fiji	61–5	New Zealand	Argentina	Wales	Australia	
V	1997	Chichibu Stadium	Fiji	54–19	New Zealand	Japan (3rd)	President's VII	Wales	
VI	1998	Chichibu Stadium	New Zealand	24–7	Fiji	Australia (3rd)	Samoa	President's VII	
VII	1999	Chichibu Stadium	New Zealand	12–7	Fiji	Samoa (3rd)	Australia	Canada	
		Tokyo 7s	Winner	Score	Runner-up	Plate	Bowl	Shield	
VIII	2000	Chichibu Stadium	Fiji	27–22	Australia	Japan	Samoa	n/a	
IX	2001	Chichibu Stadium	New Zealand	26–22	Australia	South Africa	Argentina	n/a	
		No international Tokyo Sevens tournament for men's teams played from 2002 to 2011							
XX	2012	Chichibu Stadium	Australia	28–26	Samoa	Fiji	France	Scotland	
XXI	2013	Chichibu Stadium	South Africa	24–19	Fiji	United States	England	Canada	
XXII	2014	Chichibu Stadium	Fiji	33–26	South Africa	Australia	Wales	Argentina	
XXIII	2015	Chichibu Stadium	England	21–14	South Africa	New Zealand	United States	Portugal	

Key:
Blue border on the left indicates tournaments included in the World Rugby Sevens Series.

== See also ==
- Japan Women's Sevens
