= 2012 Japan Sevens =

- Host nation: Japan
- Date: 31 March – 1 April 2012

Cup
- Champion: Australia
- Runner-up: Samoa
- Third: New Zealand

Plate
- Winner: Fiji
- Runner-up: South Africa

Bowl
- Winner: France
- Runner-up: United States

Shield
- Winner: Scotland
- Runner-up: Kenya

Tournament details
- Matches played: 45
- Tries scored: 229 (average 5.09 per match)
- Most points: (New Zealand) Junior Tomasi Cama (39 points)
- Most tries: (New Zealand) Waisake Naholo (Samoa) Ken Pisi (6 tries)

The 2012 Japan Sevens was the first edition of the tournament since 2001 and the seventh tournament of the 2011–12 IRB Sevens World Series. The host stadium was the Chichibunomiya Rugby Stadium.

Australia won the title by defeating Samoa 28–26 in the final.

== Format ==
The teams were divided into pools of four teams, who played a round-robin within the pool. Points were awarded in each pool on a different schedule from most rugby tournaments—3 for a win, 2 for a draw, 1 for a loss. The six pool winners and the two top second-place finishers advanced to the Cup competition, the Plate competition was contested by the losing quarterfinalists from the Cup. The Bowl was contested by the four remaining second-place finishers and the top four third-place finishers while the Shield was contested by the remaining eight entrants.

== Teams ==
The following teams participated:

- Argentina
- Australia
- England
- Fiji
- France
- Hong Kong
- Japan
- Kenya
- New Zealand
- Portugal
- Russia
- Samoa
- Scotland
- South Africa
- Wales
- United States

== Pool stage ==
The draw was made on March 25.

Key to colours in group tables
Teams that advanced to the Cup Quarterfinal

=== Pool A ===
Teams	Pld	W	D	L	PF	PA	+/−	Pts
England	3	3	0	0	48	19	+29	9
Fiji	3	2	0	1	50	21	+29	7
France	3	1	0	2	31	41	−10	5
Japan	3	0	0	3	17	65	−48	3

31 March 2012
12:12

Fiji	17 – 0	France

Chichibunomiya Rugby Stadium, Tokyo

31 March 2012
12:34

England	15 – 5	Japan
	Report^{[usurped]}

Chichibunomiya Rugby Stadium, Tokyo

31 March 2012
15:47

Fiji	26 – 7	Japan
	Report^{[usurped]}

Chichibunomiya Rugby Stadium, Tokyo

31 March 2012
16:09

England	19 – 7	France
	Report^{[usurped]}

Chichibunomiya Rugby Stadium, Tokyo

31 March 2012
17:41

France	24 – 5	Japan
	Report^{[usurped]}

Chichibunomiya Rugby Stadium, Tokyo

31 March 2012
19:09

Fiji	7 – 14	England
	Report^{[usurped]}

Chichibunomiya Rugby Stadium, Tokyo

=== Pool B ===
Teams	Pld	W	D	L	PF	PA	+/−	Pts
New Zealand	3	3	0	0	88	15	+73	9
Australia	3	2	0	1	42	36	+6	7
United States	3	1	0	2	26	60	−34	5
Hong Kong	3	0	0	3	33	78	−45	3

31 March 2012
10:00

New Zealand	26 – 5	United States
	Report^{[usurped]}

Chichibunomiya Rugby Stadium, Tokyo

31 March 2012
10:22

Australia	17 – 14	Hong Kong
	Report^{[usurped]}

Chichibunomiya Rugby Stadium, Tokyo

31 March 2012
13:35

New Zealand	40 – 0	Hong Kong
	Report^{[usurped]}

Chichibunomiya Rugby Stadium, Tokyo

31 March 2012
13:57

Australia	15 – 0	United States
	Report^{[usurped]}

Chichibunomiya Rugby Stadium, Tokyo

31 March 2012
16:35

United States	21 – 19	Hong Kong
	Report^{[usurped]}

Chichibunomiya Rugby Stadium, Tokyo

31 March 2012
18:03

New Zealand	22 – 10	Australia
	Report^{[usurped]}

Chichibunomiya Rugby Stadium, Tokyo

=== Pool C ===
Teams	Pld	W	D	L	PF	PA	+/−	Pts
Wales	3	3	0	0	49	12	+37	9
Argentina	3	2	0	1	42	24	+18	7
Russia	3	1	0	2	33	49	−16	5
Kenya	3	0	0	3	24	63	−39	3

31 March 2012
10:44

Argentina	15 – 7	Kenya
	Report^{[usurped]}

Chichibunomiya Rugby Stadium, Tokyo

31 March 2012
11:06

Wales	10 – 7	Russia
	Report^{[usurped]}

Chichibunomiya Rugby Stadium, Tokyo

31 March 2012
14:19

Argentina	22 – 0	Russia
	Report^{[usurped]}

Chichibunomiya Rugby Stadium, Tokyo

31 March 2012
14:41

Wales	22 – 0	Kenya
	Report^{[usurped]}

Chichibunomiya Rugby Stadium, Tokyo

31 March 2012
16:57

Kenya	17 – 26	Russia
	Report^{[usurped]}

Chichibunomiya Rugby Stadium, Tokyo

31 March 2012
18:25

Argentina	5 – 17	Wales
	Report^{[usurped]}

Chichibunomiya Rugby Stadium, Tokyo

=== Pool D ===
Teams	Pld	W	D	L	PF	PA	+/−	Pts
Samoa	3	3	0	0	73	34	+39	9
South Africa	3	2	0	1	33	45	−12	7
Portugal	3	1	0	2	42	40	+2	5
Scotland	3	0	0	3	14	43	−29	3

31 March 2012
11:28

South Africa	14 – 0	Scotland
	Report^{[usurped]}

Chichibunomiya Rugby Stadium, Tokyo

31 March 2012
11:50

Samoa	21 – 20	Portugal
	Report^{[usurped]}

Chichibunomiya Rugby Stadium, Tokyo

31 March 2012
15:03

South Africa	12 – 7	Portugal
	Report^{[usurped]}

Chichibunomiya Rugby Stadium, Tokyo

31 March 2012
15:25

Samoa	14 – 7	Scotland
	Report^{[usurped]}

Chichibunomiya Rugby Stadium, Tokyo

31 March 2012
17:19

Scotland	7 – 15	Portugal
	Report^{[usurped]}

Chichibunomiya Rugby Stadium, Tokyo

31 March 2012
18:47

South Africa	7 – 38	Samoa
	Report^{[usurped]}

Chichibunomiya Rugby Stadium, Tokyo

== Knockout stage ==
=== Shield ===
Quarter-finals
1 April – Tokyo
France	22
Scotland	19
1 April – Tokyo
Russia	12
Hong Kong	17
1 April – Tokyo
Portugal	21
Japan	5
1 April – Tokyo
United States	12
Kenya	7

Semi-finals
1 April – Tokyo
Scotland	21
Russia	19
1 April – Tokyo
Japan	17
Kenya	24

Final
1 April – Tokyo
Scotland	26
Kenya	12

=== Bowl ===
Quarter-finals
1 April – Tokyo
France	22
Scotland	19
1 April – Tokyo
Russia	12
Hong Kong	17
1 April – Tokyo
Portugal	21
Japan	5
1 April – Tokyo
United States	12
Kenya	7

Semi-finals
1 April – Tokyo
France	26
Hong Kong	15
1 April – Tokyo
Portugal	10
United States	20

Final
1 April – Tokyo
France	17
United States	12

=== Plate ===
Quarter-finals
1 April – Tokyo
England	21
South Africa	17
1 April – Tokyo
Wales	14
Australia	21
1 April – Tokyo
Samoa	24
Fiji	21
1 April – Tokyo
New Zealand	40
Argentina	5

Semi-finals
1 April – Tokyo
South Africa	22
Wales	10
1 April – Tokyo
Fiji	21
Argentina	14

Final
1 April – Tokyo
South Africa	10
Fiji	14

=== Cup ===
Quarter-finals
1 April – Tokyo
England	21
South Africa	17
1 April – Tokyo
Wales	14
Australia	21
1 April – Tokyo
Samoa	24
Fiji	21
1 April – Tokyo
New Zealand	40
Argentina	5

Semi-finals
1 April – Tokyo
England	12
Australia	33
1 April – Tokyo
Samoa	17
New Zealand	12

Final
1 April – Tokyo
Australia	28
Samoa	26
Third place
1 April – Tokyo
England	17
New Zealand	24
