= 2012 Wellington Sevens =

- Host nation: New Zealand
- Date: 3–4 February 2012

Cup
- Champion: New Zealand
- Runner-up: Fiji
- Third: England

Plate
- Winner: South Africa
- Runner-up: Tonga

Bowl
- Winner: Kenya
- Runner-up: Australia

Shield
- Winner: Scotland
- Runner-up: Cook Islands

Tournament details
- Matches played: 45
- Tries scored: 224 (average 4.98 per match)
- Most points: (New Zealand) Junior Tomasi Cama (45 points)
- Most tries: (Kenya) Collins Injera (7 tries)

The 2012 Wellington Sevens was part of the 2011–12 IRB Sevens World Series and was the 13th edition of the tournament, hosted at Wellington, New Zealand's Westpac Stadium.

New Zealand won the title by defeating Fiji 24–7 in the final.

== Format ==
The teams were divided into pools of four teams, who played a round-robin within the pool. Points were awarded in each pool on a different schedule from most rugby tournaments—3 for a win, 2 for a draw, 1 for a loss. The top two teams in each pool advanced to the Cup competition. The four quarterfinal losers dropped into the bracket for the Plate. The Bowl was contested by the third- and fourth-place finishers in each pool, with the losers in the Bowl quarterfinals dropping into the bracket for the Shield.

== Teams ==
The participating teams are:

- Argentina
- Australia
- Canada
- Cook Islands
- England
- Fiji
- France
- Japan
- Kenya
- New Zealand
- Samoa
- Scotland
- South Africa
- Tonga
- United States
- Wales

== Pool stage ==
The draw was made on December 10, 2011.

Key to colours in group tables
Teams that advanced to the Cup Quarterfinal

All times are local (UTC+13)

=== Pool A ===
Teams	Pld	W	D	L	PF	PA	+/−	Pts
New Zealand	3	3	0	0	102	14	+88	9
Samoa	3	2	0	1	57	47	+10	7
Scotland	3	1	0	2	76	50	+26	5
Japan	3	0	0	3	14	138	−124	3

3 February 2012
15:12

New Zealand	29 – 7	Scotland
	Report

Westpac Stadium, Wellington

3 February 2012
15:34

Samoa	29 – 14	Japan
	Report

Westpac Stadium, Wellington

3 February 2012
18:08

New Zealand	54 – 0	Japan
	Report

Westpac Stadium, Wellington

3 February 2012
18:30

Samoa	21 – 14	Scotland
	Report

Westpac Stadium, Wellington

3 February 2012
20:28

Scotland	55 – 0	Japan
	Report

Westpac Stadium, Wellington

3 February 2012
21:56

New Zealand	19 – 7	Samoa
	Report

Westpac Stadium, Wellington

=== Pool B ===
Teams	Pld	W	D	L	PF	PA	+/−	Pts
South Africa	3	3	0	0	78	10	+68	9
England	3	2	0	1	66	26	+40	7
Cook Islands	3	1	0	2	38	92	−54	5
United States	3	0	0	3	22	76	−54	3

3 February 2012
13:00

South Africa	21 – 0	United States
	Report

Westpac Stadium, Wellington

3 February 2012
13:22

England	27 – 12	Cook Islands
	Report

Westpac Stadium, Wellington

3 February 2012
15:56

South Africa	43 – 0	Cook Islands

Westpac Stadium, Wellington

3 February 2012
16:18

England	29 – 0	United States
	Report

Westpac Stadium, Wellington

3 February 2012
18:54

United States	22 – 26	Cook Islands
	Report

Westpac Stadium, Wellington

3 February 2012
20:50

South Africa	14 – 10	England
	Report

Westpac Stadium, Wellington

=== Pool C ===
Teams	Pld	W	D	L	PF	PA	+/−	Pts
Tonga	3	2	1	0	55	42	+13	8
Fiji	3	2	0	1	64	17	+47	7
Wales	3	1	1	1	33	40	−7	6
Argentina	3	0	0	3	21	74	−53	3

3 February 2012
13:44

Fiji	31 – 0	Argentina
	Report

Westpac Stadium, Wellington

3 February 2012
14:06

Wales	14 – 14	Tonga
	Report

Westpac Stadium, Wellington

3 February 2012
16:40

Fiji	14 – 17	Tonga
	Report

Westpac Stadium, Wellington

3 February 2012
17:03

Wales	19 – 7	Argentina
	Report

Westpac Stadium, Wellington

3 February 2012
19:14

Argentina	14 – 24	Tonga
	Report

Westpac Stadium, Wellington

3 February 2012
21:12

Fiji	19 – 0	Wales
	Report

Westpac Stadium, Wellington

=== Pool D ===
Teams	Pld	W	D	L	PF	PA	+/−	Pts
Canada	3	2	0	1	52	42	+10	7
France	3	1	1	1	50	46	+4	6
Australia	3	1	1	1	34	57	−23	6
Kenya	3	1	0	2	66	57	+9	5

3 February 2012
14:28

France	14 – 19	Canada
	Report

Westpac Stadium, Wellington

3 February 2012
14:50

Australia	10 – 35	Kenya
	Report

Westpac Stadium, Wellington

3 February 2012
17:24

France	26 – 17	Kenya
	Report

Westpac Stadium, Wellington

3 February 2012
17:46

Australia	14 – 12	Canada
	Report

Westpac Stadium, Wellington

3 February 2012
19:36

Canada	21 – 14	Kenya
	Report

Westpac Stadium, Wellington

3 February 2012
21:34

France	10 – 10	Australia
	Report

Westpac Stadium, Wellington

== Knockout stage ==
=== Shield ===
Quarter-finals
4 February – Wellington
Scotland	5
Kenya	14
4 February – Wellington
Wales	10
United States	0
4 February – Wellington
Australia	33
Japan	5
4 February – Wellington
Cook Islands	0
Argentina	28

Semi-finals
4 February – Wellington
Scotland	14
United States	12
4 February – Wellington
Japan	10
Cook Islands	17

Final
4 February – Wellington
Scotland	19
Cook Islands	17

=== Bowl ===
Quarter-finals
4 February – Wellington
Scotland	5
Kenya	14
4 February – Wellington
Wales	10
United States	0
4 February – Wellington
Australia	33
Japan	5
4 February – Wellington
Cook Islands	0
Argentina	28

Semi-finals
4 February – Wellington
Kenya	17
Wales	7
4 February – Wellington
Australia	24
Argentina	12

Final
4 February – Wellington
Kenya	12
Australia	7

=== Plate ===
Quarter-finals
4 February – Wellington
New Zealand	22
France	7
4 February – Wellington
Tonga	7
England	26
4 February – Wellington
Canada	12
Samoa	15
4 February – Wellington
South Africa	5
Fiji	21

Semi-finals
4 February – Wellington
France	7
Tonga	15
4 February – Wellington
Canada	19
South Africa	21

Final
4 February – Wellington
Tonga	0
South Africa	24

=== Cup ===
Quarter-finals
4 February – Wellington
New Zealand	22
France	7
4 February – Wellington
Tonga	7
England	26
4 February – Wellington
Canada	12
Samoa	15
4 February – Wellington
South Africa	5
Fiji	21

Semi-finals
4 February – Wellington
New Zealand	17
England	12
4 February – Wellington
Samoa	5
Fiji	28

Final
4 February – Wellington
New Zealand	24
Fiji	7
Third place
4 February – Wellington
England	21
Samoa	12
