= 2014 South Africa Sevens =

- Sevens World Series XVI
- Host nation: South Africa
- Date: 13–14 December 2014

Cup
- Champion: South Africa
- Runner-up: New Zealand
- Third: Australia

Plate
- Winner: United States
- Runner-up: Fiji

Bowl
- Winner: Canada
- Runner-up: Kenya

Shield
- Winner: Portugal
- Runner-up: Samoa

Tournament details
- Matches played: 45
- Tries scored: 265 (average 5.89 per match)
- Most points: (Australia) Pama Fou (55)
- Most tries: (Australia) Pama Fou (11)

The 2014 South Africa Sevens was the second tournament within the 2014–15 Sevens World Series. It was held over the weekend of 13–14 December 2014 at Nelson Mandela Bay Stadium in Port Elizabeth, South Africa.

== Format ==
The teams are drawn into four pools of four teams each. Each team plays every other team in their pool once. The top two teams from each pool advance to the Cup/Plate brackets. The bottom two teams from each group go to the Bowl/Shield brackets.

== Teams ==
The 16 participating teams for the tournament:

- Argentina
- Australia
- Canada
- England
- Fiji
- France
- Japan
- Kenya
- New Zealand
- Portugal
- Samoa
- Scotland
- South Africa
- United States
- Wales
- Zimbabwe

== Match officials ==
The match officials for the 2014 South Africa Sevens are as follows:

- Mike Adamson (Scotland)
- Federico Anselmi (Argentina)
- Nick Briant (New Zealand)
- Ben Crouse (South Africa)
- Richard Kelly (New Zealand)
- Anthony Moyes (Australia)
- Matt O'Brien (Australia)
- Rasta Rasivhenge (South Africa)
- Marius van der Westhuizen (South Africa)

== Pool Stage ==
Key to colours in group tables
Teams that advanced to the Cup Quarterfinal

=== Pool A ===
Team	Pld	W	D	L	PF	PA	PD	Pts
South Africa	3	3	0	0	100	7	+93	9
United States	3	2	0	1	71	43	+28	7
Wales	3	1	0	2	41	79	−38	5
Kenya	3	0	0	3	17	100	–83	3

13 December 2014
12:42

South Africa	26–0	United States
	Report

NMBS, Port Elizabeth

13 December 2014
13:04

Wales	29–5	Kenya
	Report

NMBS, Port Elizabeth

13 December 2014
15:58

South Africa	38–7	Kenya
	Report

NMBS, Port Elizabeth

13 December 2014
16:20

Wales	12–38	United States
	Report

NMBS, Port Elizabeth

13 December 2014
19:36

United States	33–5	Kenya
	Report

NMBS, Port Elizabeth

13 December 2014
19:58

South Africa	36–0	Wales
	Report

NMBS, Port Elizabeth

=== Pool B ===
Team	Pld	W	D	L	PF	PA	PD	Pts
Argentina	3	3	0	0	76	33	+43	9
Australia	3	2	0	1	104	52	+52	7
Portugal	3	1	0	2	47	54	–7	5
Zimbabwe	3	0	0	3	12	100	–88	3

13 December 2014
11:14

Australia	33–21	Portugal
	Report

NMBS, Port Elizabeth

13 December 2014
11:36

Argentina	31–5	Zimbabwe
	Report

NMBS, Port Elizabeth

13 December 2014
14:30

Australia	50–0	Zimbabwe
	Report

NMBS, Port Elizabeth

13 December 2014
14:52

Argentina	14–7	Portugal
	Report

NMBS, Port Elizabeth

13 December 2014
17:48

Portugal	19–7	Zimbabwe
	Report

NMBS, Port Elizabeth

13 December 2014
18:10

Australia	21–31	Argentina
	Report

NMBS, Port Elizabeth

=== Pool C ===
Team	Pld	W	D	L	PF	PA	PD	Pts
Fiji	3	3	0	0	90	24	+66	9
Scotland	3	1	0	2	43	45	–2	5
Canada	3	1	0	2	42	62	–20	5
France	3	1	0	2	41	85	–44	5

13 December 2014
10:30

Fiji	45–5	France
	Report

NMBS, Port Elizabeth

13 December 2014
10:52

Scotland	12–14	Canada
	Report

NMBS, Port Elizabeth

13 December 2014
13:46

Fiji	26–7	Canada
	Report

NMBS, Port Elizabeth

13 December 2014
14:08

Scotland	19–12	France
	Report

NMBS, Port Elizabeth

13 December 2014
17:04

France	24–21	Canada
	Report

NMBS, Port Elizabeth

13 December 2014
17:26

Fiji	19–12	Scotland
	Report

NMBS, Port Elizabeth

=== Pool D ===
Team	Pld	W	D	L	PF	PA	PD	Pts
New Zealand	3	3	0	0	58	7	+51	9
England	3	2	0	1	67	12	+55	7
Japan	3	1	0	2	17	88	–71	5
Samoa	3	0	0	3	28	63	–35	3

13 December 2014
11:58

New Zealand	24–7	Samoa
	Report

NMBS, Port Elizabeth

13 December 2014
12:20

England	45–0	Japan
	Report

NMBS, Port Elizabeth

13 December 2014
15:14

New Zealand	29–0	Japan
	Report

NMBS, Port Elizabeth

13 December 2014
15:36

England	22–7	Samoa
	Report

NMBS, Port Elizabeth

13 December 2014
18:52

Samoa	14–17	Japan
	Report

NMBS, Port Elizabeth

13 December 2014
19:14

New Zealand	5–0	England
	Report

NMBS, Port Elizabeth

== Knockout stage ==
=== Shield ===
Quarter-finals
14 December 2014 – 10:51 – NMBS, Port Elizabeth
Wales	24
Samoa	22
14 December 2014 – 11:13 – NMBS, Port Elizabeth
Canada	22
Zimbabwe	5
14 December 2014 – 11:35 – NMBS, Port Elizabeth
Japan	12
Kenya	26
14 December 2014 – 11:57 – NMBS, Port Elizabeth
Portugal	7
France	42

Semi-finals
14 December 2014 – 14:07 – NMBS, Port Elizabeth
Samoa	21
Zimbabwe	14
14 December 2014 – 14:29 – NMBS, Port Elizabeth
Japan	15
Portugal	24

Final
14 December 2014 – 17:43 – NMBS, Port Elizabeth
Samoa	14
Portugal	19

=== Bowl ===
Quarter-finals
14 December 2014 – 10:51 – NMBS, Port Elizabeth
Wales	24
Samoa	22
14 December 2014 – 11:13 – NMBS, Port Elizabeth
Canada	22
Zimbabwe	5
14 December 2014 – 11:35 – NMBS, Port Elizabeth
Japan	12
Kenya	26
14 December 2014 – 11:57 – NMBS, Port Elizabeth
Portugal	7
France	42

Semi-finals
14 December 2014 – 14:51 – NMBS, Port Elizabeth
Wales	14
Canada	24
14 December 2014 – 15:13 – NMBS, Port Elizabeth
Kenya	14
France	12

Final
14 December 2014 – 18:08 – NMBS, Port Elizabeth
Canada	24
Kenya	5

=== Plate ===
Quarter-finals
14 December 2014 – 12:19 – NMBS, Port Elizabeth
South Africa	31
England	7
14 December 2014 – 12:41 – NMBS, Port Elizabeth
Fiji	19
Australia	31
14 December 2014 – 13:03 – NMBS, Port Elizabeth
New Zealand	28
United States	7
14 December 2014 – 13:25 – NMBS, Port Elizabeth
Argentina	24
Scotland	19

Semi-finals
14 December 2014 – 15:55 – NMBS, Port Elizabeth
England	0
Fiji	31
14 December 2014 – 16:17 – NMBS, Port Elizabeth
United States	26
Scotland	19

Final
14 December 2014 – 18:33 – NMBS, Port Elizabeth
Fiji	14
United States	21

=== Cup ===
Quarter-finals
14 December 2014 – 12:19 – NMBS, Port Elizabeth
South Africa	31
England	7
14 December 2014 – 12:41 – NMBS, Port Elizabeth
Fiji	19
Australia	31
14 December 2014 – 13:03 – NMBS, Port Elizabeth
New Zealand	28
United States	7
14 December 2014 – 13:25 – NMBS, Port Elizabeth
Argentina	24
Scotland	19

Semi-finals
14 December 2014 – 16:39 – NMBS, Port Elizabeth
South Africa	19
Australia	10
14 December 2014 – 17:01 – NMBS, Port Elizabeth
New Zealand	29
Argentina	0

Final
14 December 2014 – 19:30 – NMBS, Port Elizabeth
South Africa	26
New Zealand	17
Third place
14 December 2014 – 18:58 – NMBS, Port Elizabeth
Australia	34
Argentina	19

== Scoring ==
Rank	Player	Points
1	(Australia) Pama Fou	55
2	(Australia) James Stannard	40
2	(South Africa) Seabelo Senatla	40
4	(United States) Madison Hughes	39
4	(South Africa) Branco Du Preez	39
6	(New Zealand) Joe Webber	37
7	(Fiji) Osea Kolinisau	35
8	(Argentina) Javier Rojas	32
9	(United States) Carlin Isles	30
10	(multiple players)	35

Source: WR website
