= Al Caravelli =

US rugby union player & coach

- Born: 1959 or 1960 Queens, New York
- Height: 5 ft 7 in (1.70 m)
- Weight: 155 lb (70 kg)
- University: UCLA
- Occupation(s): Software sales and rugby union coach

Rugby union career
- Position(s): Scrum-half, Wing
Coaching career
- Years: Team
- 2000–2005: NYAC
- 2000-2005: Dir, US 7s Women's
- 2006–2012: Head Coach, US 7s Team
- 2012-: Philippines sevens
- Correct as of Feb 13, 2012

Al Caravelli (born 1959 or 1960 in Queens, New York) is head coach of the Philippines national rugby sevens team. He was head coach of the United States national rugby sevens team from 2006 until 2012.

Caravelli inherited a team that was on a 30 game losing streak. The US national sevens team improved steadily on the IRB Sevens World Series circuit under Caravelli's leadership, improving from 15th during the 2006-07 season to 10th during the 2010-11 season. Caravelli managed to transform the US team into a legitimate IRB Sevens World Series contender in his first few years. Following several strong performances in several tournaments during 2006-08, in 2008 the US team was promoted to "core" status as one of the 12 teams competing in all events on the IRB Sevens World Series. He is the winningest USA coach in history, by percent and record. His is the only USA coach to have a winning record against Canada and Argentina, both Pan-Am and World Series rivals.

Caravelli led the US team to its first ever Cup final in an IRB Sevens World Series event in Adelaide in 2010. Caravelli guided the national team to a bronze medal at the 2011 Pan American Games.

Caravelli becomes Philippines head coach in August 2012. He stopped coaching the Philippines in 2013.

== U.S. national team ==
Caravelli leveraged the increased exposure of rugby's planned return to the Olympics in 2016 by overseeing a transition in the U.S. national team from amateur to professional status. Caravelli had set the goal of professionalizing the U.S. team, stating that his number one objective in improving the team was getting a full-time squad that would have more time to train together. Caravelli was a key part of U.S. 7s rugby winning a grant from the USOC that allowed the U.S. to contract with 15 professional full-time rugby players for the U.S. national rugby sevens team. Caravelli’s goal for the U.S. national team was to win a gold medal at the 2016 Olympics.

Caravelli recruited for new talent for the U.S. national team. Caravelli attended the National All Star 7s Championship, scouted for players at the various domestic sevens competitions, and also scouted at regional open try-outs. Caravelli was the longest tenured coach in U.S. history for rugby sevens, and at the time of his departure had more wins than any other U.S. national team sevens coach.

== Philippine national team ==
In August 2012, Caravelli took over the coaching of the Philippines national rugby sevens team. Three months later, he guided the Philippine team for a berth in the 2013 Rugby World Cup Sevens in Moscow.

== Previous playing and coaching experience ==
Caravelli played several sports in his youth. Caravelli played varsity football as a freshman at St. Francis High. Caravelli began playing rugby in his sophomore year of high school. Caravelli attended UCLA on a soccer scholarship, and played for UCLA when they won the NCAA championship in 1985. Caravelli played rugby with several clubs throughout the US, including the Los Angeles Rugby Club.

Caravelli took up coaching, when he retired from playing, in part because his father advised him he would make a better coach than a referee. Caravelli was the Director of the US Women's sevens program (2000-2005) and coached with NYAC (2000-2005) prior to becoming head coach of the US national team.

== See also ==
- IRB Sevens World Series
- Philippines national rugby sevens team
- United States national rugby sevens team
