= Zack Test =

Former American rugby union player/current coach

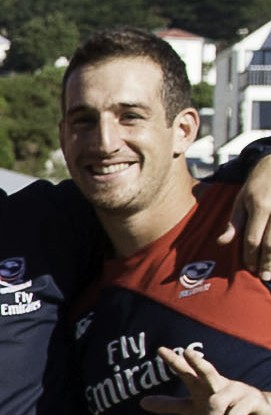
- Born: Zachary Test; October 13, 1989 (age 37) United States
- Height: 6 ft 3 in (1.91 m)
- Weight: 195 lb (88 kg; 13 st 13 lb)
- School: Woodside High School
- University: Loughborough University; University of Oregon

Rugby union career
- Position(s): Full back Wing
Youth career
- Peninsula Green RFC
International career
Years	Team	Apps	(Points)
2015–2017	United States	7	(0)
National sevens team
Years	Team		Comps
2009–2016	United States		52 (601)
Coaching career
- Years: Team
- 2017: San Diego State
- 2017–2021: San Diego Legion
- 2025-: United States men's national rugby sevens team
Medal record
Men's rugby union
Representing United States
Maccabiah Games
Bronze medal – third place	2009 Maccabiah	Team competition

Zachary "Zack" Test (born October 13, 1989) is an American retired rugby union player who played for the United States national rugby sevens team. With 143 career tries in the World Rugby Sevens Series, Test led all U.S. players in tries scored until Perry Baker broke his record in early 2018. He is the former head coach of the San Diego Legion of Major League Rugby (MLR).

== Early life and youth rugby ==
Test was born in Woodside, California, and lived in Redwood City. He is Jewish and went to Ronald C. Wornick Jewish Day School in Foster City. He attended Woodside High School, graduating in 2007. Test began playing rugby in his freshman year of high school.

Test began his collegiate career playing American football in 2007 at the University of Oregon as a wide receiver under Mike Bellotti, where he was a preferred walk-on but did not see playing time and red-shirted. Test also played rugby for the University of Oregon helping them qualify for the regional playoffs. After his freshman year, Test transferred to Loughborough University.

Test also represented his country with the national under-20 rugby union team.

== U.S. national rugby sevens team ==
Test made his sevens senior debut during the 2008–09 IRB Sevens World Series and represented the United States at the Hong Kong, Adelaide and London Sevens that year. Test quickly became a regular for the U.S. team, playing for the US in every tournament in the IRB Sevens World Series during the 2009–10 season. Test also played for the U.S. in every tournament in the IRB Sevens World Series during the 2010–11 season. T. Test led the U.S. team during the 2010-11 IRB Sevens World Series with 24 tries and 120 points, scoring 6 tries at the 2011 Hong Kong Sevens. Test also played for the US at the 2011 Pan American Games, helping the U.S. team to win the bronze medal. Test's performance throughout 2011 for the US national team earned him the Rugby Mag 2011 Men's 7s Player of the Year award.

Test quickly emerged as one of the best players on the U.S. team. During the 2011-12 IRB Sevens World Series, Test broke Jovesa Naivalu's U.S. national sevens career record of 47 tries. Test was also one of the best on the IRB circuit in catching kicks from restarts, using his 6'3" height, his jumping ability and his excellent hands to haul in the high ball. Test had a reputation as one of the best players in the game at catching restarts. Paul Treu, head coach of the South Africa rugby team, has stated that when it comes to catching kicks, Test is "one of the best players in the business." Test finished the 2011–12 World Series leading the United States with 21 tries.

== USA Eagles ==
Test debuted for the Eagles 15's side in the 2015 Pacific Nations Cup against Samoa. Test picked up a head injury at the 2017 Americas Rugby Championship, requiring him to leave the match and obtain medical treatment. After sitting out of rugby for several months without playing, Test announced his retirement from the game in early 2018.

== Other international ==
Test, who is Jewish, played for the United States Maccabiah rugby union team at the 2009 Maccabi Games, and was instrumental in helping the squad win the bronze medal beating the Israel national rugby union team at Herzliya Municipal Stadium.

== Coaching career ==
Zach Test served as the assistant coach with the Women's Eagles Sevens from 2021 to 2025, when he was then appointed as the head coach of the Men's Eagles Sevens. The Men's Eagles Sevens were promoted from SVNS 2 to the SVNS 1 league during the HSBS SVNS World Championship in Bordeaux under his leadership.

== See also ==
- United States national rugby sevens team
- United States national under-20 rugby union team
- IRB Sevens World Series
- List of select Jewish rugby union footballers
