= Folau Niua =

US international rugby union player

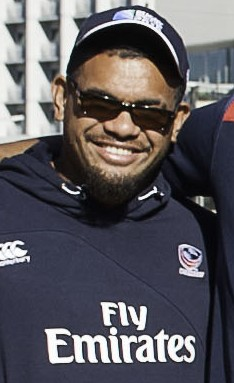
- Born: January 27, 1985 (age 41) Palo Alto, California, U.S.
- Height: 6 ft 2 in (188 cm)
- Weight: 197 lb (89 kg)

Rugby union career
- Position: Fly-half
Amateur team(s)
| Years | Team | Apps | (Points) |
- East Palo Alto
| – | SFGG | | |
Senior career
| Years | Team | Apps | (Points) |
| 2014 | Glasgow | 1 | (0) |
- Correct as of June 27, 2014
International career
| Years | Team | Apps | (Points) |
| 2013–2015 | United States | 17 | (28) |
- Correct as of 1 January 2021
National sevens team
| Years | Team | | Comps |
| 2011–2022 | United States | | 72 |
- Correct as of 1 January 2023

Folau Niua (born January 27, 1985) is an American rugby union former player. He played fly-half for the United States national rugby sevens team from 2011 to 2022, and holds the U.S. record for most tournament appearances with over 65 caps.

== Early career ==
Folau Niua is from East Palo Alto in California, and attended high school at Woodside High. Niua previously played his club rugby with the East Palo Alto Razorbacks, where he helped the club win the 2009 Division II national championship. He then played with San Francisco Golden Gate, where he helped the team win the 2011 Rugby Super League national championship. Niua played in the August 2011 national all-star championships, where his impressive scoring ability and fitness led the Pacific Coast team.

== Rugby career ==
=== U.S. national team (7s) ===
Niua debuted for the United States national sevens team at the 2011 Pan American Games, where, despite his lack of international tournament experience, he was the starting flyhalf. Niua was the top scorer for the U.S. in that tournament with 41 points, including a 78% success rate in kicking his conversions, helping the U.S. achieve a bronze medal.

Niua signed a professional contract with USA Rugby in January 2012 to play full-time for the U.S. national sevens team. Niua was a regular on the U.S. national team in the 2011–12 IRB Sevens World Series, finishing the season as one of the leading scorers for the team. Niua also played for the U.S. during the 2012–13 IRB Sevens World Series, leading the team with 30 points at the 2012 South Africa Sevens. Niua also played for the U.S. during the 2016 Summer Olympics.

=== U.S. national team (15s) ===
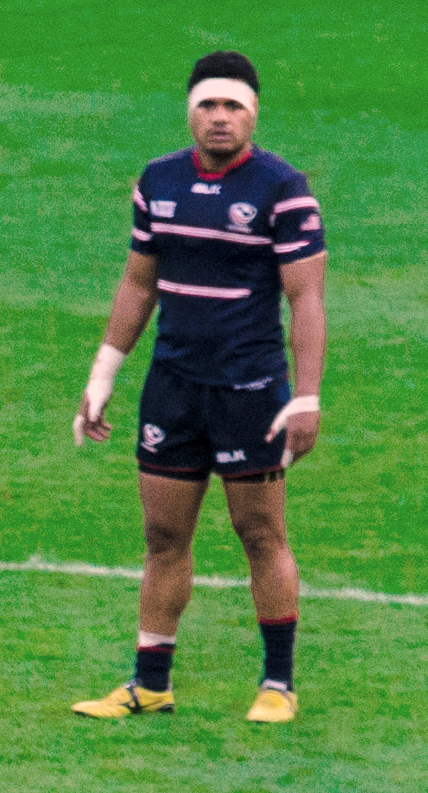
Folau Niua playing for the USA during the 2015 World Cup

Niua had been in consideration for a place at the 2011 Rugby World Cup, but ultimately did not make the tournament roster. Niua made the roster for the 2015 Rugby World Cup where he played as a center.

=== Professional career ===
In February 2014, Niua signed a contract with the Glasgow Warriors. Niua was released by Glasgow at the end of the season having made only one appearance for the club.

== Honors ==
Individual

- World Rugby Men's Sevens Player of the Year nominee: 2019
