= 2018 Dubai Sevens =

World Rugby Sevens Series tournament

- Sevens World Series XX
- Host nation: United Arab Emirates
- Date: 30 November–1 December 2018

Cup
- Champion: New Zealand
- Runner-up: United States
- Third: England

Challenge Trophy
- Winner: Samoa

Tournament details
- Matches played: 45
- Tries scored: 278 (average 6.18 per match)
- Most points: John Porch (54)
- Most tries: Marcos Moroni (7)

The 2018 Dubai Sevens is the twentieth edition of the Dubai Sevens tournament. It was the first tournament within the 2018–19 World Rugby Sevens Series. It was held on 30 November and 1 December 2018 at The Sevens Stadium in Dubai, United Arab Emirates.

== Format ==
The sixteen teams were drawn into four pools of four teams each. Every team played each of the other three in their pool once. The top two teams from each pool advanced to the Cup bracket where teams competed for the gold, silver, and bronze medals. The bottom two teams from each group went to the Challenge Trophy bracket.

== Teams ==
Fifteen core teams are participating in the tournament along with one invited team, 2018 Africa Men's Sevens winners Zimbabwe:

- Argentina
- Australia
- Canada
- England
- Fiji
- France
- Japan
- Kenya
- New Zealand
- Samoa
- Scotland
- South Africa
- Spain
- United States
- Wales
- Zimbabwe

== Pool stage ==
All times in UAE Standard Time (UTC+4:00)

Key to colours in group tables
Teams that advanced to the Cup Quarterfinal

=== Pool A ===
Team	Pld	W	D	L	PF	PA	PD	Pts
South Africa	3	2	0	1	62	29	33	7
Argentina	3	2	0	1	58	52	6	7
Samoa	3	2	0	1	50	53	−3	7
Zimbabwe	3	0	0	3	34	70	−36	3

30 November
10:30

Argentina	19–21	Samoa

The Sevens, Dubai
Referee: Richard Haughton (England)

30 November
10:52

South Africa	31–0	Zimbabwe

The Sevens, Dubai
Referee: Matt Rodden (Hong Kong)

30 November
14:14

Argentina	22–19	Zimbabwe

The Sevens, Dubai
Referee: Jérémy Rozier (France)

30 November
14:36

South Africa	19–12	Samoa

The Sevens, Dubai
Referee: Damián Schneider (Argentina)

30 November
19:31

Samoa	17–15	Zimbabwe

The Sevens, Dubai
Referee: Rasta Rasivhenge (South Africa)

30 November
19:53

South Africa	12–17	Argentina

The Sevens, Dubai
Referee: Damon Murphy (Australia)

=== Pool B ===
Team	Pld	W	D	L	PF	PA	PD	Pts
Fiji	3	3	0	0	105	31	74	9
Scotland	3	1	1	1	68	49	19	6
France	3	1	1	1	35	72	−37	6
Kenya	3	0	0	3	43	99	−56	3

30 November
9:44

Kenya	14–35	Scotland

The Sevens, Dubai
Referee: Paulo Duarte (Portugal)

30 November
10:06

Fiji	41–0	France

The Sevens, Dubai
Referee: James Doleman (New Zealand)

30 November
12:44

Kenya	17–21	France

The Sevens, Dubai
Referee: Damon Murphy (Australia)

30 November
13:06

Fiji	21–19	Scotland

The Sevens, Dubai
Referee: Rasta Rasivhenge (South Africa)

30 November
18:44

Scotland	14–14	France

The Sevens, Dubai
Referee: Damián Schneider (Argentina)

30 November
19:06

Fiji	43–12	Kenya

The Sevens, Dubai
Referee: Jérémy Rozier (France)

=== Pool C ===
Team	Pld	W	D	L	PF	PA	PD	Pts
New Zealand	3	3	0	0	80	31	49	9
United States	3	2	0	1	69	36	33	7
Spain	3	1	0	2	52	64	−12	5
Wales	3	0	0	3	26	96	−70	3

30 November
9:00

United States	29–0	Spain

The Sevens, Dubai
Referee: Rasta Rasivhenge (South Africa)

30 November
9:22

New Zealand	28–7	Wales

The Sevens, Dubai
Referee: Damon Murphy (Australia)

30 November
12:00

United States	33–12	Wales

The Sevens, Dubai
Referee: James Doleman (New Zealand)

30 November
12:22

New Zealand	28–17	Spain

The Sevens, Dubai
Referee: Paulo Duarte (Portugal)

30 November
18:00

Spain	35–7	Wales

The Sevens, Dubai
Referee: Matt Rodden (Hong Kong)

30 November
18:22

New Zealand	24–7	United States

The Sevens, Dubai
Referee: Richard Haughton (England)

=== Pool D ===
Team	Pld	W	D	L	PF	PA	PD	Pts
Australia	3	3	0	0	96	38	58	9
England	3	2	0	1	76	41	35	7
Canada	3	1	0	2	58	64	−6	5
Japan	3	0	0	3	14	101	–87	3

30 November
11:14

England	26–12	Canada

The Sevens, Dubai
Referee: Jérémy Rozier (France)

30 November
11:36

Australia	43–0	Japan

The Sevens, Dubai
Referee: Damián Schneider (Argentina)

30 November
14:58

England	31–7	Japan

The Sevens, Dubai
Referee: Matt Rodden (Hong Kong)

30 November
15:20

Australia	31–19	Canada

The Sevens, Dubai
Referee: Richard Haughton (England)

30 November
20:15

Canada	27–7	Japan

The Sevens, Dubai
Referee: Paulo Duarte (Portugal)

30 November
20:37

Australia	22–19	England

The Sevens, Dubai
Referee: James Doleman (New Zealand)

== Knockout stage ==
=== Thirteenth place ===
Semi-finals
1 December – 13:38 – The Sevens
Japan	26
Kenya	19
1 December – 14:00 – The Sevens
Zimbabwe	10
Wales	14

Thirteenth place
1 December – 17:53 – The Sevens
Japan	7
Wales	31

=== Challenge Trophy ===
Quarter-finals
1 December – 9:30 – The Sevens
Samoa	40
Japan	12
1 December – 9:52 – The Sevens
Spain	26
Kenya	19
1 December – 10:14 – The Sevens
Canada	38
Zimbabwe	5
1 December – 10:36 – The Sevens
France	38
Wales	17

Challenge Trophy Final
1 December – 14:22 – The Sevens
Samoa	26
Spain	22
1 December – 14:44 – The Sevens
Canada	12
France	28

Final
1 December – 18:15 – The Sevens
Samoa	33
France	24

=== Fifth place ===
Semi-finals
1 December – 15:33 – The Sevens
South Africa	29
Scotland	0
1 December – 15:55 – The Sevens
Argentina	21
Fiji	31

Fifth place
1 December – 18:40 – The Sevens
South Africa	19
Fiji	24

=== Cup ===
Quarter-finals
1 December– 11:00 – The Sevens
South Africa	5
England	22
1 December– 11:22 – The Sevens
New Zealand	21
Scotland	7
1 December– 11:44 – The Sevens
Australia	38
Argentina	0
1 December– 12:06 – The Sevens
Fiji	12
United States	24

Semi-finals
1 December– 16:17 – The Sevens
England	5
New Zealand	7
1 December– 16:39 – The Sevens
Australia	17
United States	22

Cup Final
1 December– 19:29 – The Sevens
New Zealand	21
United States	5
Third place
1 December– 19:04 – The Sevens
England	15
Australia	14

== Tournament placings ==
Place	Team	Points
1st place, gold medalist(s)	New Zealand	22
2nd place, silver medalist(s)	United States	19
3rd place, bronze medalist(s)	England	17
4	Australia	15
5	Fiji	13
6	South Africa	12
7	Argentina	10
7	Scotland	10

Place	Team	Points
9	Samoa	8
10	France	7
11	Canada	5
11	Spain	5
13	Wales	3
14	Japan	2
15	Kenya	1
15	Zimbabwe	1

Source: World Rugby

== Players ==
=== Scoring leaders ===
Tries scored
Rank	Player	Tries
1	Marcos Moroni	7
2	Alamanda Motuga	6
2	John Porch	6
2	Muller Du Plessis	6
2	Perry Baker	6

Points scored
Rank	Player	Points
1	John Porch	54
2	Andrew Knewstubb	52
3	Tom Mitchell	41
4	Luke Treharne	35
5	Katsuyuki Sakai	32

Source: World Rugby

== See also ==
- 2018 Dubai Women's Sevens
- World Rugby Sevens Series
- 2018–19 World Rugby Sevens Series
- World Rugby

World Sevens Series XX
Preceded by None (first event)	2018 Dubai Sevens	Succeeded by 2018 South Africa Sevens
Dubai Sevens
Preceded by 2017 Dubai Sevens	2018 Dubai Sevens	Succeeded by 2019 Dubai Sevens
