= United States men's national rugby sevens team =

United States
- Union: USA Rugby
- Nickname: The Eagles
- Coach: Zack Test
- Captain: Stephen Tomasin
- Most caps: Folau Niua (387) (Note: Caps are only inclusive of those earned on the World Rugby Sevens Series main event)
- Top scorer: Madison Hughes (1,596) (Note: Points are only inclusive of those earned on the World Rugby Sevens Series main event)
- Most tries: Perry Baker (293) (Note: Tries are only inclusive of those earned on the World Rugby Sevens Series main event)
Team kit	Change kit

World Cup Sevens
- Appearances: 8 (First in 1993)
- Best result: 6th (2018)

Official website
- eagles.rugby/mens-eagles-sevens

Medal record

Pan American Games
Bronze medal – third place	2011 Guadalajara	Team
Bronze medal – third place	2015 Toronto	Team
Bronze medal – third place	2019 Lima	Team

The United States national rugby sevens team competes in international rugby sevens competitions. The national sevens team is organized by USA Rugby.

The main competition the team plays in every year is the World Rugby Sevens Series, a series of ten tournaments played around the globe from December to June that includes the USA Sevens tournament every spring. The Eagles have been a core team in the World Series and finished in the top twelve each season since 2008–09. The Eagles' best season in the Sevens Series has been a second-place finish in the 2018–19 Series. The best result in a single Sevens tournament was first place, which they have accomplished three times — winning the 2015 London Sevens and the 2018 and 2019 USA Sevens.

The team also participates in major tournaments every four years, such as the Summer Olympics, the Rugby World Cup Sevens, and the Pan American Games. Their best finishes in quadrennial events include finishing ninth at the 2016 Olympics, finishing sixth at the 2018 Rugby World Cup Sevens, and winning bronze medals at the 2011, 2015 and 2019 Pan American Games.

The United States had traditionally used the sevens team to prepare players for the XV-side. Since January 2012, due to increased attention generated by rugby's return to the Olympics in 2016, the national sevens team has turned professional, with the team extending paid full-time contracts to its players. The national sevens team has drawn a number of crossover athletes from other sports, the most prominent examples being Perry Baker (American football) and Carlin Isles (track). The U.S. also sometimes fields a developmental team, the USA Falcons, in several tournaments.

== History ==
The earliest records of an American national rugby sevens team are from the 1986 and 1988 Hong Kong Sevens, where a team named the American Eagles won the Plate Final. The team competed as the United States national rugby sevens team at the inaugural 1993 Rugby World Cup Sevens. The U.S. competed in nine of the ten tournaments in the inaugural 1999–2000 World Sevens Series.

== World Rugby Sevens Series ==
The World Rugby Sevens Series, which is played every year from December through June, is the primary annual competition for the U.S. national sevens team.

=== Early years (1999–2011) ===
The U.S. has competed in the World Series every year since the event's inaugural 1999–2000 season. The U.S. had some initial success during the early years of the tournament led by Jovesa Naivalu, who held the record for most tries scored until broken by Zack Test. However, the U.S. struggled in the five seasons from 2002–03 through 2006–07.

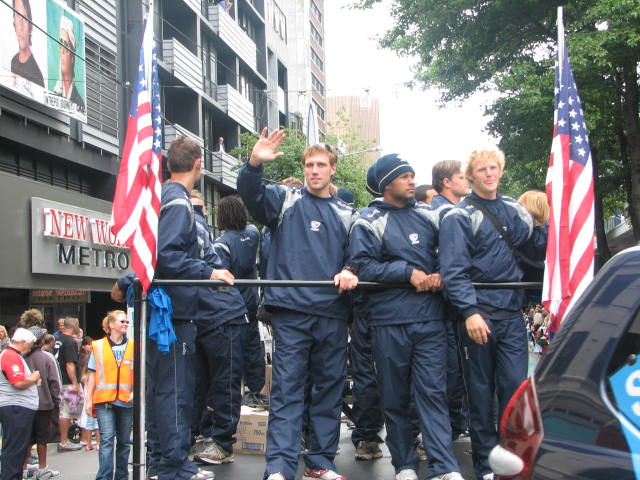
The U.S. national rugby sevens team in Wellington for the 2008 New Zealand Sevens

The 2007–08 season was a turning point for the U.S. team, qualifying for 6 of the 8 series tournaments, and defeating France and Samoa en route to placing sixth at the 2007 South Africa Sevens. The team was led by Chris Wyles who scored 26 tries on the season. The IRB rewarded the Eagles' success by promoting the U.S. to "core" team status for the 2008–09 season, meaning that the U.S. automatically plays in all 8 tournaments without having to go through qualifying rounds.

The 2008–09 season was a breakout season for the U.S., finishing 11th on the season. The high point of the team's season was the home tournament, the 2009 USA Sevens. Nese Malifa's 30 points in that tournament helped the U.S. reach the semifinals, their best result to that time on home soil.

The 2009–10 season saw continued improvement, with the team finishing the season in 10th place. Led by Matt Hawkins and Nese Malifa, the team finished ninth to win the Bowl in the 2010 USA Sevens. The U.S. then advanced to their first ever Cup final at the 2010 Adelaide Sevens, scoring upset wins against England, Wales and Argentina.

During the 2010–11 season the team took a small step back with a 12th-place finish. A number of key players were unavailable for most or all of the season, including the previous season's leading try scorer Nick Edwards and leading point scorer Nese Malifa. Additionally, a number of competing teams had moved to professional status, leaving the mostly amateur U.S. team struggling to keep pace.

=== Professional era begins (2011–2014) ===
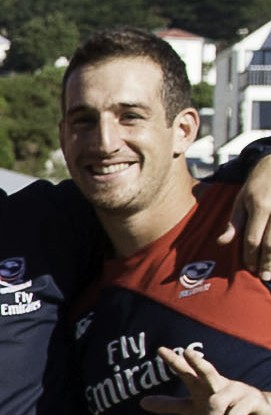
Zack Test

The 2011–12 season saw significant changes for the U.S. The team turned professional in January 2012, with contracts for up to 15 players. The change to professional status did not bring immediate improvement. Head coach Al Caravelli resigned, and Alex Magleby was selected as the new head coach. The U.S. finished the 2011–12 season in 11th, a slight improvement over the previous season, even though the team did not reach the quarterfinals of any of the 9 tournaments. Bright spots for the season included the emerging leadership of Shalom Suniula (captain), Zack Test (team leading 21 tries) and Colin Hawley.

The 2012–13 Series saw a slightly different format, with 15 core teams instead of 12, but with the possibility of relegation for the teams that finished in the bottom three. The U.S. got off to a slow start, ranked last among the 15 core teams after the first two legs. The U.S. saw improvement, however, reaching the quarterfinals in five of the last seven tournaments, and finishing in the top 6 during the last three tournaments. The U.S. finished fifth to win the Plate Final at the 2013 Japan Sevens, the first time the U.S. had won a plate since 2001, and followed that feat by again finishing fifth to win the Plate Final at the 2013 Scotland Sevens, with Nick Edwards the leading try-scorer in the tournament with 8 tries. The U.S. finished the season in 11th place, and had two players among the season's top try-scorers: Nick Edwards (20) and Zack Test (18). Coach Alex Magleby stepped down after the season.

The U.S. team fared poorly during the 2013–14 Series under new coach Matt Hawkins, finishing the season in 13th place. Once again, Zack Test led the team with 23 tries and 119 points on the season; other leading scorers included Carlin Isles with 17 tries, including six at the 2014 Wellington Sevens, and newcomer Madison Hughes with 34 goals scored. Hawkins was blamed for the exodus of several veteran players, such as Colin Hawley and Shalom Suniula, and was asked to step down at the end of the season.

=== Top 6 finishes (2014–present) ===
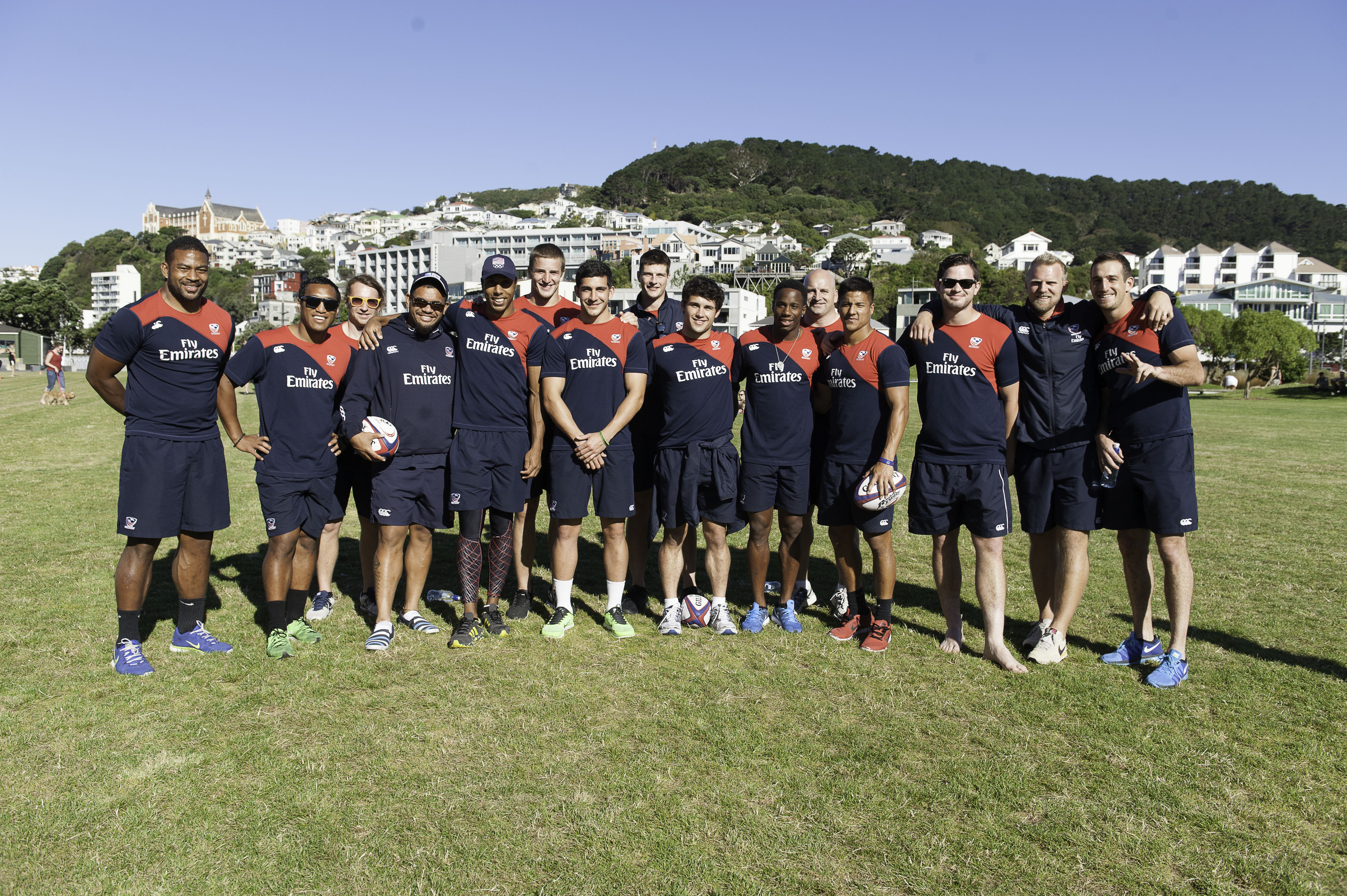
USA Rugby sevens team in 2014

The U.S. had its best season ever in the 2014–15 Series under head coach Mike Friday, who was hired in summer 2014. The U.S. finished sixth in the series, its best finish to date. The team capped off the season by winning the 2015 London Sevens after defeating Australia in the cup final, the first time the U.S. has won a World Series tournament. Carlin Isles set a U.S. record with 32 tries for the season and Madison Hughes set a record with 296 points.

The U.S. began the 2015–16 Series by "shocking the world" when it defeated New Zealand for the first time at 2015 Dubai Sevens. The team beat the 12-time World Series champion in pool play and again in the tournament's third-place match before a third victory in as many matches in the 2015 South Africa Sevens Plate Semifinal. The U.S. once again finished the season in sixth, tying its best ever finish. The previous season's scoring records were broken again, as Perry Baker notched 48 tries and Madison Hughes scored 331 points.

The U.S. began the 2016-17 World Series slowly, sitting in 11th place after the first three rounds. The U.S. was missing certain key players from the previous season. The U.S. turned things around mid-season. In the second half of the season, the team for the first time reached four consecutive semifinals: first at the USA Sevens where the U.S. finished third; then at the Canada Sevens where Perry Baker scored 9 tries including his 100th career try; followed by Hong Kong and Singapore. The U.S. finished the season in fifth place overall, a record high for the team. Perry Baker was the season's leading try scorer (57) and points scorer (285) on the Series, whereas Madison Hughes ranked third in points (279). Perry Baker and Danny Barrett were both selected to the 2016-17 Dream Team, and Baker was selected as the 2017 World Rugby Sevens Player of the Year.

The 2017–18 season began badly for the U.S. In the first tournament in Dubai, Baker suffered a concussion, and the rest of the team limped to a last place finish. The U.S. improved from that point on, reaching the semifinals of the Australia Sevens. The team then won the 2018 USA Sevens, the first time the U.S. won their home tournament, boosted in large part by Perry Baker, who led all scorers with 8 tries; Baker, along with forwards Ben Pinkelman and Danny Barrett all made the tournament Dream Team. Overall the team displayed inconsistent performances, reaching the Cup semifinals three times, but also failing to qualify for the cup quarterfinals three times. Despite the inconsistent play, the U.S. finished sixth overall.

The U.S. got off to a strong start in the 2018–19 season. The team reached the finals in Dubai, South Africa, New Zealand, and Australia, the first time the U.S. had reached four consecutive finals and was ranked joint first in the overall Series after the first four legs. In the fifth leg, the U.S. won beating Samoa 27–0. This was the U.S.'s second straight USA Sevens win, giving them sole possession of first place in the Sevens World Series. The U.S. remained in first place for several more tournaments, but consecutive semifinal losses to Fiji in the last two tournaments in London and Paris meant that Fiji won the Series with the U.S. finishing second. The U.S. overall had its best season ever — the second place finish beating their previous best of fifth. Additionally, qualifying for five consecutive tournament finals as well as reaching the semifinals in all ten tournaments were U.S. records. Carlin Isles scored 52 tries, ranked first overall among all players.

The U.S. started slowly in the 2019–20 season; with the team resting some players who had played at the October 2019 Rugby World Cup, the team sat in eighth place after the first two events.

The Eagles were led by head coach Mike Friday from 2014–2024, until he resigned and was replaced by Simon Amor.

=== Season by season ===
Season	Rank	Points	Events	Cups	Plates	Bowls / Challenge*	Shields	Result	Most tries	Most points
1999–2000	18th	0	9/10	0	0	0	0	Dubai - 11th Stellenbosch - / Punta del Este - 13th Mar del Plata - 11th Wellington - 13th Suva - 13th Brisbane - 13th Hong Kong - 13th Tokyo - 11th Paris - 13th	Don Younger (19)	
2000–01	10th	16	3/9	0	1	0	0	Durban - / Dubai - / Wellington - (bronze); Hong Kong - 9th Shanghai - / Kuala Lumpur - / Tokyo - 10th London - / Cardiff - /	Jovesa Naivalu (20)	Jovesa Naivalu (100)
2001–02	11th	12	6/11	0	0	1	0	Durban - / Santiago - 9th Mar Del Plata - 9th Brisbane - 8th Wellington - 9th Beijing - 7th Hong Kong - 11th Singapore - / Kuala Lumpur - / London - / Cardiff - /	David Fee (23)	Jone Naqica (161)
2002–03	19th	1	3/7	0	0	1	0	Dubai - / George - / Brisbane - 10th Wellington - 11th Hong Kong - 17th Cardiff - / London - /	Jovesa Naivalu & Riaan van Zyl (7)	John Buchholz (53)
2003–04	15th	0	4/8	0	0	0	2	Dubai - / George - / Wellington - 16th Los Angeles - 13th Hong Kong - 13th Singapore - 16th Bordeaux - / London - /		
2004–05	14th	0	2/7	0	0	0	0	Dubai - / George - / Wellington - 16th Los Angeles - 16th Singapore - / London - / Paris - /		
2005–06	15th	0	3/8	0	0	0	0	Dubai - / George - / Wellington - 16th Los Angeles - 14th Hong Kong - 24th Singapore - / Paris - / London - /		
2006–07	15th	2	3/8	0	0	0	1	Dubai - / George - / Wellington - 16th San Diego - 13th Hong Kong - 12th Adelaide - / London - / Edinburgh - /	Jason Pye (8)	Jone Naqica (70)
2007–08	13th	6	6/8	0	0	0	1	Dubai - 16th George - 6th Wellington - 13th San Diego - 10th Hong Kong - 16th Adelaide - 10th London - / Edinburgh - /	Chris Wyles (26)	Chris Wyles (130)
2008–09	11th	20	8/8	0	0	0	3	Dubai - 13th George - 8th Wellington - 8th San Diego - 4th Hong Kong - 13th Adelaide - 13th London - 14th Edinburgh - 13th	Kevin Swiryn (20)	Kevin Swiryn (100)
2009–10	10th	32	8/8	0	0	1	1	Dubai - 11th George - 11th Wellington - 13th Las Vegas - 9th Adelaide - (silver); Hong Kong - 8th London - 12th Edinburgh - 12th	Nick Edwards (17)	Nese Malifa (120)
2010–11	12th	10	8/8	0	0	1	2	Dubai - 7th George - 16th Wellington - 13th Las Vegas - 13th Hong Kong - 11th Adelaide - 9th London - 15th Edinburgh - 15th	Zack Test (24)	Zack Test (120)
2011–12	11th	41	9/9	0	0	0	0	Gold Coast - 12th Dubai - 10th Port Elizabeth - 12th Wellington - 16th Las Vegas - 12th Hong Kong - 10th Tokyo - 10th Glasgow - 14th London - 14th	Zack Test (21)	Zack Test (107)
2012–13	11th	71	9/9	0	2	0	0	Gold Coast - 14th Dubai - 12th Port Elizabeth - 8th Wellington - 16th Las Vegas - 7th Hong Kong - 11th Tokyo - 5th Glasgow - 5th London - 6th	Nick Edwards (20)	Shalom Suniula (101)
2013–14	13th	41	9/9	0	0	0	4	Gold Coast - 13th Dubai - 16th Port Elizabeth - 12th Las Vegas - 13th Wellington - 13th Tokyo -6th Hong Kong - 7th Glasgow - 15th London - 13th	Zack Test (23)	Zack Test (119)
2014–15	6th	108	9/9	1	1	2	0	Gold Coast - 9th Dubai - 12th Port Elizabeth - 5th Wellington - 8th Las Vegas - 4th Hong Kong - 6th Tokyo - 9th Glasgow - 4th London - (gold)	Carlin Isles (32)	Madison Hughes (296)
2015–16	6th	117	10/10	0	0	0	0	Dubai - (bronze); Cape Town - 6th Wellington - 8th Sydney - 7th Las Vegas - 4th Vancouver - 6th Hong Kong - 6th Singapore - 10th Paris - 12th London - (bronze)	Perry Baker (48)	Madison Hughes (331)
2016–17	5th	129	10/10	0	—N/a	1	—N/a	Dubai - 9th Cape Town - 7th Wellington - 11th Sydney - 6th Las Vegas - (bronze); Vancouver - 4th Hong Kong - 4th Singapore - (silver); Paris - 5th London - 4th	Perry Baker (57)	Perry Baker (285)
2017–18	6th	117	10/10	1	—N/a	1	—N/a	Dubai - 15th Cape Town - 6th Sydney - 4th Hamilton - 9th Las Vegas - (gold); Vancouver - 4th Hong Kong - 6th Singapore - 9th London - 6th Paris - 6th	Carlin Isles (49)	Carlin Isles (247)
2018–19	2nd	177	10/10	1	—N/a	0	—N/a	Dubai - (silver); Cape Town - (silver); Hamilton- (silver); Sydney - (silver); Las Vegas - (gold); Vancouver - 4th Hong Kong - (bronze); Singapore - 4th London - (bronze); Paris - 4th	Carlin Isles (52)	Madison Hughes (299)
2019–20	7th	72	6/6	0	—N/a	0	—N/a	Dubai - 8th Cape Town - 9th Hamilton - 6th Sydney - (bronze); Los Angeles - 5th Vancouver - 6th	Carlin Isles (22)	Carlin Isles (110)
2021	5th	22	2/2	0	—N/a	0	—N/a	Vancouver - 5th Edmonton - 6th	Malacchi Esdale (12)	Malacchi Esdale (60)
2021–22	6th	87	9/9	0	—N/a	1	—N/a	Dubai I - (silver); Dubai II - 7th Málaga - 6th Seville - 5th Singapore - 6th Vancouver - 13th Toulouse - 7th London - 10th Los Angeles - 7th	Kevon Williams (31)	Stephen Tomasin (201)
2022–23	10th	98	11/11	0	—N/a	0	—N/a	Hong Kong I - 6th Dubai - 4th Cape Town - (bronze); Hamilton - (bronze); Sydney - 12th Los Angeles - 13th Vancouver - 6th Hong Kong II - 8th Singapore - 13th Toulouse - 16th London - 10th	Perry Baker (35)	Stephen Tomasin (225)
2023–24	9th	52	7/7	0	—N/a	—N/a	—N/a	Dubai - 8th Cape Town - 11th Perth - 7th Vancouver - 4th Los Angeles - 8th Hong Kong - 7th Singapore - 7th	Perry Baker (30)	Perry Baker (150)
2023–24	– (Grand Finals)	—N/a	0/1	—N/a	—N/a	—N/a	—N/a	Madrid - /		
2024–25	12th	12	6/6		—N/a	—N/a	—N/a	Dubai - 12th Cape Town - 10th Perth - 12th Vancouver - 9th Hong Kong - 12th Singapore - 11th		
2024–25	– (Grand Finals)	—N/a	0/1	—N/a	—N/a	—N/a	—N/a	United States -		
2025–26	Did not qualify, relegated to Division 2									
2025–26	8th (Grand Finals)	17	3/3		—N/a			Hong Kong - 12th Valladolid - 9th Bordeaux - 5th		
Total	—N/a	1,260	183/222	3	4	9	14	—N/a	Perry Baker (293)	Madison Hughes (1,596)

*At the start of the 2016–17 season, the plate and shield awards were abandoned, with the bowl replaced by the Challenge Trophy.
Updated as of April 7, 2025

US Rugby at the SVNs Qualifiers
Games	Host	Record	Result
2025 SVNs Qualifier	(Spain) Madrid	4–0	Qualified

== Players ==
=== Current squad ===
The following players have been selected to represent the United States during the 2023–24 SVNS tournament beginning in December 2023.

Note: Caps reflect the total number of SVNS events competed in as of the 2023 South Africa Sevens.

Player	Position	Date of birth (age)	Caps	Club/province
Orrin Bizer	Forward	November 28, 2000 (age 25)	2	Unattached
Ben Broselle	Forward	May 23, 1999 (age 27)	18	Unattached
Adam Channel	Forward	January 16, 1997 (age 29)	12	Unattached
Aaron Cummings	Forward	July 1, 1997 (age 29)	15	Unattached
Ben Pinkelman (c)	Forward	June 13, 1994 (age 32)	38	Unattached
Lance Williams	Forward	February 18, 1993 (age 33)	4	Utah Warriors
Will Chevalier	Back	September 18, 2000 (age 25)	3	Unattached
Malacchi Esdale	Back	May 4, 1995 (age 31)	20	Unattached
Naima Fuala'au	Back	February 3, 1996 (age 30)	24	Unattached
Madison Hughes	Back	October 26, 1992 (age 33)	54	Unattached
Lucas Lacamp	Back	June 4, 2001 (age 25)	15	Unattached
Marcus Tupuola	Back	October 5, 1995 (age 30)	26	Unattached
Pita Vi	Back	January 31, 2002 (age 24)	5	Unattached

== Player pool ==
A pool of American full-time professional rugby players train year round at the Olympic Training Center in San Diego. The twelve players selected for tournament rosters are generally drawn from this training squad. For particularly high-profile tournaments such as the Olympics, the U.S. sometimes draws from American players who are playing rugby professionally abroad.

USA Rugby has since January 2012 provided full-time salaried contracts to players. Previously, players had been part-time semi-pro players paid a stipend for their participation. USA Rugby CEO Nigel Melville stated that a full-time sevens team is a crucial step as USA Rugby prepares for rugby's return to the Olympics in 2016.

The inclusion of rugby sevens in the Olympics had greatly expanded funding available to the sport in the U.S. The large pool of American football players who may be unable to earn professional contracts in the NFL meant there may be athletes with skills that could transfer to rugby union.

=== Coaches ===
Position	Name
Head coach	Simon Amor
Assistant coach	Ben Pinkelman
Assistant coach	Perry Baker
Strength & Conditioning	Josh Schnell
Athletic Trainer	Colby Thompson

== Tournament history ==
=== Summer Olympics ===
US Rugby at the Summer Olympics
Games	Host	Record	Result	Most tries	Most points	Qualifying
2016	Rio, Brazil	3–2	9th	C. Isles (6)	C. Isles (30)	2015 NACRA Sevens (1st)
2020	Tokyo, Japan	3–2	6th	Isles / Baker (3)	M. Hughes (26)	2018–19 World Series (2nd)
2024	Paris, France	1–1–4	8th	Baker (6)	Baker (30)	2023 RAN Sevens (1st)

Although the fifteens version of rugby union had last appeared in the Olympics at the 1924 Games, rugby sevens made its debut at the 2016 Olympics in Rio de Janeiro. The U.S. qualified for the 2016 Olympics by defeating Canada 21–5 in the final of the 2015 NACRA Sevens. At the 2016 Olympics, the U.S. went 1–2 in pool play, narrowly missing the quarterfinals due to a 14–17 loss to Argentina. The U.S. finished in ninth place, with Carlin Isles scoring six tries and Danny Barrett scoring four tries. The U.S. defeated Canada 24–14 in the 2023 RAN Sevens to clinch a spot at the 2024 Olympics.

=== Rugby World Cup Sevens ===
The U.S. has participated in every Rugby World Cup Sevens since the tournament's inception in 1993. The team's best performance to date has been its sixth-place finish at the 2018 tournament, which was held on home soil.

Rugby World Cup Sevens Record
Year	Result	Position	Pld	W	L	D	Most tries	Most points
(Scotland) 1993	Group Stage	17th	5	1	4	0		
(Hong Kong) 1997	Bowl Winner	17th	7	4	3	0	Malakai Delai	
(Argentina) 2001	Plate Quarterfinalist	13th	6	2	4	0		
(Hong Kong) 2005	Bowl Quarterfinalist	13th	6	2	4	0		
(United Arab Emirates) 2009	Plate Quarterfinalist	13th	4	1	3	0		
(Russia) 2013	Plate Quarterfinalist	13th	4	1	3	0	Nick Edwards (4)	Nick Edwards (20)
(United States) 2018	5th-Place Final	6th	4	2	2	0	Perry Baker (3)	Madison Hughes (32)
(South Africa) 2022	Challenge Trophy Semifinal	11th	4	2	2	0	Perry Baker (4)	Perry Baker (20)
Total	0 Titles	8/8	40	15	25	0	Baker / Delai (7)	Perry Baker / Delai (35)

=== Pan American Games ===
The U.S. has played rugby sevens at every Pan Am Games since the sport was introduced at the 2011 Games. At the 2011 Games, the U.S. lost 19–21 to Canada in the semifinals before defeating Uruguay 19–17 for the bronze. At the 2015 Games, the U.S. again lost to Canada 19–26 in the semifinals and defeated Uruguay 40–12 to capture their second consecutive bronze. At the 2019 Games, a weakened U.S. side that left its regular starters at home defeated Brazil 24–19 to take the bronze medal.

Year	Host	Record (W-L-D)	Result	Most tries	Most points
2011	Guadalajara, Mexico	3–2–1	3rd	Maka Unufe (5)	Folau Niua (41)
2015	Toronto, Canada	5–1	3rd	Carlin Isles (6)	Madison Hughes (31)
2019	Lima, Peru	3–2	3rd	Travion Clark (6)	Travion Clark (30)
2023	Santiago, Chile	3–2	4th	Nick Orlando Hardrict II; Pita Vi (4)	Nick Orlando Hardrict II (22)

=== World Games ===
Games	Host	U.S. Record	U.S. Finish
2001	Akita, Japan	—N/a	—N/a
2005	Duisburg, Germany	1–5	6th
2009	Kaohsiung, Taiwan	2–4	5th
2013	Cali, Colombia	—N/a	—N/a

=== Regional qualifier tournaments ===
The U.S. has played in several North American regional tournaments, often as a qualifying tournament for the Rugby World Cup Sevens or another event.

Year	Event	Result
2000	Rugby World Cup Sevens Qualifier – Santiago, Chile	Qualified for RWC 7s (5–2)
2004	NAWIRA Championship	Champions
2008	NAWIRA RWC 7s Qualifier	Cup Champions
2015	NACRA Sevens/Olympic Regional Qualifier	Cup Champions
2023	RAN Sevens/Olympic Regional Qualifier	Cup Champions

=== Other international competitions ===
Year	Event	Result	Ref.
1986	Hong Kong Sevens	Plate Champions	
1988	Hong Kong Sevens	Plate Champions	
1994	Hong Kong Sevens	Plate Final	
2006	Bangkok International Rugby Sevens	Cup Champions	
2006	Singapore Cricket Club International Rugby Sevens	Cup Quarterfinals	
2007	Singapore Cricket Club International Rugby Sevens	Plate Champions	
2010*	Digicel Suva Rugby Festival International Sevens	Cup Semifinal	
2017	Silicon Valley Sevens	Cup Finalist	
2019	Oktoberfest Sevens	8th place	
2019	Rugby X Tournament	Semifinals	

* – Played as the USA Cougars

== Player records ==
The following tables show the U.S. career leaders in major statistical categories in the World Rugby Sevens Series. These figures include only the World Rugby Sevens Series and do not include other events such as the Rugby World Cup Sevens.
Up to date as of June 5, 2024

=== Points ===
Points scored
No.	Player	Years	Points
1	Madison Hughes	2013–	1,596
2	Perry Baker	2014–	1,467
3	Stephen Tomasin	2013–	1,169
4	Carlin Isles	2013–2022	1,087
5	Zack Test	2009–2016	721
6	Folau Niua	2011–2022	651
7	Kevon Williams	2016–	556
8	Danny Barrett	2014–2021	471
9	Jone Naqica	2002–2009	411
10	Martin Iosefo	2014–2021	403

=== Tries ===
Tries scored
No.	Player	Years	Tries
1	Perry Baker	2014–	293
2	Carlin Isles	2013–2022	217
3	Zack Test	2009–2016	143
4	Stephen Tomasin	2013–	118
5	Kevon Williams	2016–	108
6	Madison Hughes	2013–	101
7	Danny Barrett	2014–2021	92
8	Martin Iosefo	2014–2021	79
9	Maka Unufe	2012–	74
10	Folau Niua	2011–2022	68

=== Matches ===
Matches played
No.	Player	Years	Matches
1	Folau Niua	2011–2022	387
2	Perry Baker	2014–	363
3	Madison Hughes	2013–	318
3	Stephen Tomasin	2013–	318
5	Zack Test	2009–16	307
6	Carlin Isles	2013–2022	284
7	Martin Iosefo	2014–2021	278
8	Danny Barrett	2014–2021	277
9	Maka Unufe	2012–	260
10	Kevon Williams	2016–	267

=== Award winners ===
The following United States Sevens players have been recognised at the World Rugby Awards since 2004:

World Rugby Men's 7s Player of the Year
Year	Nominees	Winners
2017	Perry Baker	Perry Baker
2018	Perry Baker (2)	Perry Baker (2)
2019	Folau Niua	—
2019	Stephen Tomasin	—

=== Other notable players ===
- Jovesa Naivalu — played 1999–2008; was the U.S. record holder with 47 tries, until overtaken by Zack Test.
- Matt Hawkins – played 2007–2013; ranked #2 in tries scored with 56 at the time of his retirement.
- Nick Edwards — played 2009–15; scored 53 tries and was ranked #3 in tries scored at the end of his career.
- Chris Wyles — played 2007–2009; scored 44 tries and was ranked #2 in tries scored when he left USA 7s for professional rugby in England.

== Player single season records ==
The following tables show the U.S. season leaders in major statistical categories in the World Rugby Sevens Series. These figures include only the World Rugby Sevens Series and do not include other events such as the Rugby World Cup Sevens.

Tries scored
No.	Player	Season	Tries
1	Perry Baker	2016–17	57
2	Carlin Isles	2018–19	52
3	Carlin Isles	2017–18	49
4	Perry Baker	2015–16	48
5	Perry Baker	2017–18	37

Points scored
No.	Player	Season	Points
1	Madison Hughes	2015–16	331
2	Madison Hughes	2018–19	299
3	Madison Hughes	2014–15	296
4	Perry Baker	2016–17	285
5	Madison Hughes	2016–17	279

Up to date as of September 13, 2022

== Previous head coaches ==
Coach	Tenure	Best Series Finish	Best Series Tournament	Olympics / World Cup
(United States) Emil Signes	1987–1990	—N/a	—N/a	—N/a
(United States) Steve Finkel	1991–1994	—N/a	—N/a	17th (1993 World Cup)
(United States) Mike Saunders	1995–1996	—N/a	—N/a	—N/a
(United States) Mark Williams	1996–1997	—N/a	—N/a	17th (1997 World Cup)
(United States) Bill Russell*	1997–1999	—N/a	—N/a	—N/a
(United States) Tommy Smith	1999–2001	18th (1999–2000)	12th (multiple)	—N/a
(New Zealand) John McKittrick	2001–2005	10th (2000–2001)	3rd (2001 Wellington Sevens)	13th (2005 World Cup; 2001 World Cup)
(United States) Al Caravelli	2006–2012	10th (2009–10)	2nd (2009 Adelaide)	13th (2009 World Cup)
(United States) Alex Magleby	2012–2013	11th (2011–12, 2012–13)	5th (multiple)	13th (2013 World Cup)
(South Africa) Matt Hawkins	2013–2014	13th (2013–2014)	6th (2014 Japan Sevens)	—N/a
(England) Mike Friday	2014–2024	2nd (2018–19)	1st (2015 London, 2018 USA, 2019 USA)	8th (2024 Olympics); 6th (2020 Olympics); 9th (2016 Olympics); 11th (2022 World Cup); 6th (2018 World Cup)
(England) Simon Amor	2024–2025			—N/a
(United States) Zack Test	2025–			—N/a

- In 1998–99 the United States used a three-coach rotation scheme involving Gray, Russell, and Tyler.

== Honors ==
These statistics are partially sourced from USA Rugby's Database:
Up to date as of August 21st, 2023

World Series
Finish Tourney	Gold	Silver	Bronze	Plate
Dubai Sevens	—N/a	2018, 2021	2015	—N/a
South Africa Sevens	—N/a	2018	2022	2014
Australia Sevens	—N/a	2010, 2019	—N/a	—N/a
New Zealand Sevens	—N/a	2019	2001, 2023	—N/a
USA Sevens	2018, 2019	—N/a	2009, 2017	—N/a
Canada Sevens	—N/a	—N/a	—N/a	—N/a
Hong Kong Sevens	—N/a	—N/a	2019	2001
Singapore Sevens	—N/a	2017	—N/a	—N/a
London Sevens	2015	—N/a	2016	—N/a
Paris Sevens	—N/a	—N/a	—N/a	—N/a
Scotland Sevens	—N/a	—N/a	—N/a	2013
Japan Sevens	—N/a	—N/a	—N/a	2013

Other Top Three Finishes

- 2023 RAN Sevens – Champions
- 2015 Pan American Games – Bronze Medal
- 2015 NACRA Sevens – Champions
- 2012 NACRA 7s – Runner-up
- 2011 Pan American Games – Bronze Medal
- 2008 NAWIRA RWC 7s Qualifier – Champions
- 2006 Bangkok International Sevens – Champions
- 2004 NAWIRA Championship – Champions

Plate Champions

- 2007 Singapore Cricket Club International Rugby Sevens
- 1988 Hong Kong Sevens
- 1986 Hong Kong Sevens

Bowl Champions/Challenge Trophy/Challenge Cup

- 2018 Singapore Sevens
- 2018 New Zealand Sevens
- 2016 Dubai Sevens
- 2015 Japan Sevens
- 2014 Gold Coast Sevens
- 2011 Adelaide Sevens
- 2010 USA Sevens
- 2003 Hong Kong Sevens
- 2002 Chile Sevens
- 1997 Rugby World Cup Sevens

Shield Champions

- 2014 London Sevens
- 2014 Wellington Sevens
- 2014 USA Sevens
- 2013 Gold Coast Sevens
- 2011 USA Sevens
- 2011 Wellington Sevens
- 2010 Wellington Sevens
- 2009 Edinburgh Sevens
- 2009 Adelaide Sevens
- 2008 Dubai Sevens
- 2008 Wellington Sevens
- 2007 USA Sevens
- 2004 USA Sevens
- 2004 New Zealand Sevens

== See also ==
- Rugby union in the United States
- United States national rugby union team
- United States national under-20 rugby union team
- United States women's national rugby sevens team
- USA Rugby
