= 2015 Japan Sevens =

- Sevens World Series XVI
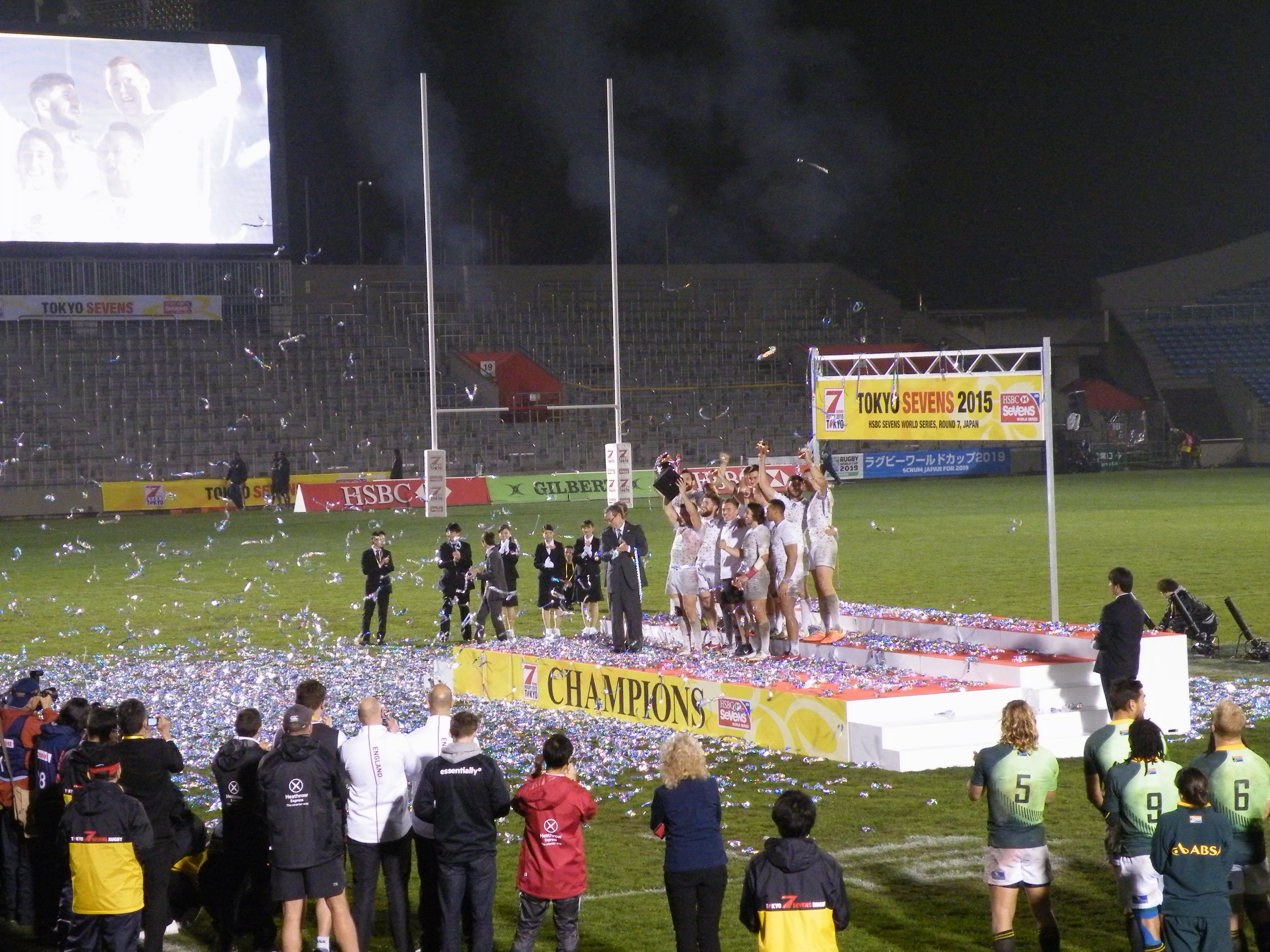
- Host nation: Japan
- Date: 4–5 April 2015

Cup
- Champion: England
- Runner-up: South Africa
- Third: Fiji

Plate
- Winner: New Zealand
- Runner-up: Scotland

Bowl
- Winner: United States
- Runner-up: Australia

Shield
- Winner: Portugal
- Runner-up: Argentina

Tournament details
- Matches played: 45
- Most tries: (United States) Carlin Isles

The 2015 Japan Sevens was held on 4–5 April 2015. It was the fourth edition of the tournament and the seventh instalment of the 2014–15 Sevens World Series.

== Format ==
The teams were drawn into four pools of four teams each. Each team played everyone in their pool one time. The top two teams from each pool advanced to the Cup/Plate brackets. The bottom two teams from each group went to the Bowl/Shield brackets.

== Teams ==
The 16 participating teams are:

- Argentina
- Australia
- Canada
- England
- Fiji
- France
- Hong Kong
- Japan
- Kenya
- New Zealand
- Portugal
- Samoa
- Scotland
- South Africa
- United States
- Wales

== Pool Stage ==
The draw was made on 29 March 2015.

Key to colours in group tables
Teams that advanced to the Cup Quarterfinal

=== Pool A ===
Teams	Pld	W	D	L	PF	PA	+/−	Pts
Fiji	3	3	0	0	87	43	+44	9
England	3	2	0	1	62	40	+22	7
Wales	3	1	0	2	48	34	+14	5
Hong Kong	3	0	0	3	19	99	–80	3

4 April 2015
10:00

Fiji	19–10	Wales
	Report

Chichibunomiya Rugby Stadium, Tokyo

4 April 2015
10:22

England	33–0	Hong Kong
	Report

Chichibunomiya Rugby Stadium, Tokyo

4 April 2015
13:18

Fiji	35–14	Hong Kong
	Report

Chichibunomiya Rugby Stadium, Tokyo

4 April 2015
13:40

England	10–7	Wales
	Report

Chichibunomiya Rugby Stadium, Tokyo

4 April 2015
17:30

Fiji	33–19	England
	Report

Chichibunomiya Rugby Stadium, Tokyo

4 April 2015
17:52

Wales	31–5	Hong Kong
	Report

Chichibunomiya Rugby Stadium, Tokyo

=== Pool B ===
Teams	Pld	W	D	L	PF	PA	+/−	Pts
New Zealand	3	2	0	1	78	26	+52	7
Scotland	3	2	0	1	34	64	–30	7
Portugal	3	1	0	2	31	53	-22	5
Australia	3	1	0	2	43	43	0	5

4 April 2015
10:44

New Zealand	38–0	Scotland
	Report

Chichibunomiya Rugby Stadium, Tokyo

4 April 2015
11:06

Australia	10–12	Portugal
	Report

Chichibunomiya Rugby Stadium, Tokyo

4 April 2015
14:02

New Zealand	26–7	Portugal
	Report

Chichibunomiya Rugby Stadium, Tokyo

4 April 2015
14:24

Australia	14–17	Scotland
	Report

Chichibunomiya Rugby Stadium, Tokyo

4 April 2015
18:14

New Zealand	14–19	Australia
	Report

Chichibunomiya Rugby Stadium, Tokyo

4 April 2015
18:36

Scotland	17–12	Portugal
	Report

Chichibunomiya Rugby Stadium, Tokyo

=== Pool C ===
Teams	Pld	W	D	L	PF	PA	+/−	Pts
South Africa	3	3	0	0	79	22	+57	9
Canada	3	1	0	2	47	61	–14	5
Kenya	3	1	0	2	37	57	–20	5
United States	3	1	0	2	42	65	–23	5

4 April 2015
11:28

South Africa	29–7	Canada
	Report

Chichibunomiya Rugby Stadium, Tokyo

4 April 2015
11:50

United States	5–27	Kenya
	Report

Chichibunomiya Rugby Stadium, Tokyo

4 April 2015
14:46

South Africa	26–0	Kenya
	Report

Chichibunomiya Rugby Stadium, Tokyo

4 April 2015
15:08

United States	22–14	Canada
	Report

Chichibunomiya Rugby Stadium, Tokyo

4 April 2015
18:58

South Africa	24–15	United States
	Report

Chichibunomiya Rugby Stadium, Tokyo

4 April 2015
19:20

Canada	26–10	Kenya
	Report

Chichibunomiya Rugby Stadium, Tokyo

=== Pool D ===
Teams	Pld	W	D	L	PF	PA	+/−	Pts
France	3	2	0	1	53	40	+13	7
Japan	3	1	1	1	59	50	+9	6
Samoa	3	1	1	1	52	64	–12	6
Argentina	3	0	2	1	47	57	–10	5

4 April 2015
12:12

Samoa	14–12	France
	Report

Chichibunomiya Rugby Stadium, Tokyo

4 April 2015
12:34

Argentina	14–14	Japan
	Report

Chichibunomiya Rugby Stadium, Tokyo

4 April 2015
15:30

Samoa	12–26	Japan
	Report

Chichibunomiya Rugby Stadium, Tokyo

4 April 2015
15:52

Argentina	7–17	France
	Report

Chichibunomiya Rugby Stadium, Tokyo

4 April 2015
19:42

Samoa	26–26	Argentina
	Report

Chichibunomiya Rugby Stadium, Tokyo

4 April 2015
20:04

France	24–19	Japan
	Report

Chichibunomiya Rugby Stadium, Tokyo

== Knockout stage ==
=== Shield ===
Quarter-finals
5 April 2015 – 09:52 – Chichibunomiya Rugby Stadium
Wales	14
Argentina	7
5 April 2015 – 10:14 – Chichibunomiya Rugby Stadium
Kenya	5
Australia	14
5 April 2015 – 10:36 – Chichibunomiya Rugby Stadium
Samoa	21
Hong Kong	0
5 April 2015 – 10:58 – Chichibunomiya Rugby Stadium
Portugal	0
United States	39

Semi-finals
5 April 2015 – 13:10 – Chichibunomiya Rugby Stadium
Argentina	17
Kenya	12
5 April 2015 – 13:32 – Chichibunomiya Rugby Stadium
Hong Kong	17
Portugal	19

Final
5 April 2015 – 16:06 – Chichibunomiya Rugby Stadium
Argentina	7
Portugal	12

=== Bowl ===
Quarter-finals
5 April 2015 – 09:52 – Chichibunomiya Rugby Stadium
Wales	14
Argentina	7
5 April 2015 – 10:14 – Chichibunomiya Rugby Stadium
Kenya	5
Australia	14
5 April 2015 – 10:36 – Chichibunomiya Rugby Stadium
Samoa	21
Hong Kong	0
5 April 2015 – 10:58 – Chichibunomiya Rugby Stadium
Portugal	0
United States	39

Semi-finals
5 April 2015 – 13:54 – Chichibunomiya Rugby Stadium
Wales	12
Australia	17
5 April 2015 – 14:16 – Chichibunomiya Rugby Stadium
Samoa	5
United States	22

Final
5 April 2015 – 16:35 – Chichibunomiya Rugby Stadium
Australia	12
United States	17

=== Plate ===
Quarter-finals
5 April 2015 – 11:20 – Chichibunomiya Rugby Stadium
Fiji	41
Japan	5
5 April 2015 – 11:42 – Chichibunomiya Rugby Stadium
South Africa	22
Scotland	0
5 April 2015 – 12:04 – Chichibunomiya Rugby Stadium
France	0
England	10
5 April 2015 – 12:26 – Chichibunomiya Rugby Stadium
New Zealand	15
Canada	19

Semi-finals
5 April 2015 – 14:38 – Chichibunomiya Rugby Stadium
Japan	5
Scotland	14
5 April 2015 – 15:00 – Chichibunomiya Rugby Stadium
France	12
New Zealand	19

Final
5 April 2015 – 17:04 – Chichibunomiya Rugby Stadium
Scotland	14
New Zealand	21

=== Cup ===
Quarter-finals
5 April 2015 – 11:20 – Chichibunomiya Rugby Stadium
Fiji	41
Japan	5
5 April 2015 – 11:42 – Chichibunomiya Rugby Stadium
South Africa	22
Scotland	0
5 April 2015 – 12:04 – Chichibunomiya Rugby Stadium
France	0
England	10
5 April 2015 – 12:26 – Chichibunomiya Rugby Stadium
New Zealand	15
Canada	19

Semi-finals
5 April 2015 – 15:22 – Chichibunomiya Rugby Stadium
Fiji	5
South Africa	7
5 April 2015 – 15:44 – Chichibunomiya Rugby Stadium
England	14
Canada	5

Final
5 April 2015 – 18:00 – Chichibunomiya Rugby Stadium
South Africa	14
England	21
Third place
5 April 2015 – 17:36 – Chichibunomiya Rugby Stadium
Fiji	21
Canada	19

== Player scoring ==
Player	Tries
(United States) Carlin Isles	7
(New Zealand) Sherwin Stowers	6
(Fiji) Josaia Raisuqe	5
(Argentina) Segundo Tuculet	5
(8 players tied)	4

Source: World Rugby
