= Carlin Isles =

American rugby sevens player (born 1989)

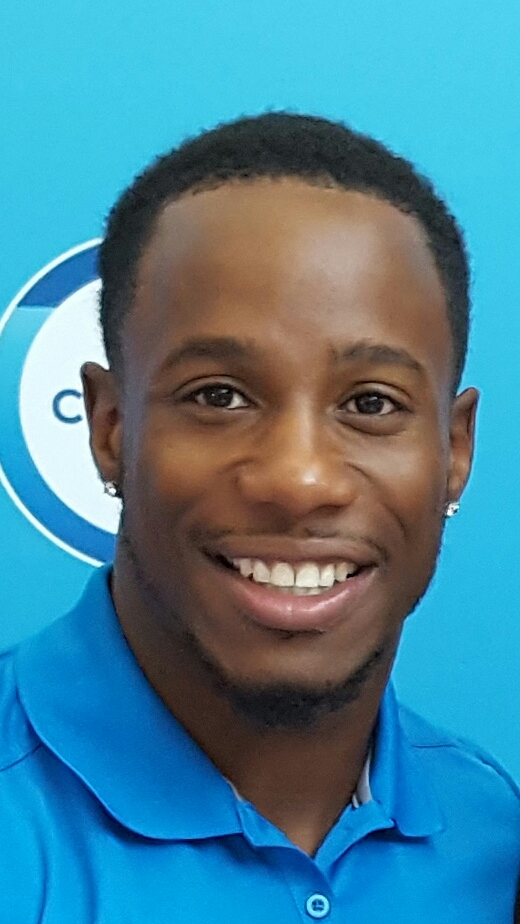
- Isles in 2016
- Full name: Carlin Russell Isles
- Born: November 21, 1989 (age 37) Akron, Ohio, U.S.
- Height: 5 ft 8 in (173 cm)
- Weight: 165 lb (75 kg)
- University: Ashland University

Rugby union career
- Position: Wing
Amateur team(s)
| Years | Team | Apps | (Points) |
| 2013 | Aspen RFC | | |
- Correct as of 18 February 2014
National sevens team
| Years | Team | | Comps |
| 2012–2022 | United States | | 284 (1087; 217t, 1c) |
- Correct as of 15 May 2023

Carlin Russell Isles (born November 21, 1989) is a former American rugby union player who played for the United States national rugby sevens team. With 202 tries, Isles is second for the United States in career tries scored, behind teammate Perry Baker. Isles has been touted as the fastest rugby player.

== Early life ==
Isles and his twin sister, Tambra, grew up in Akron, Ohio in foster homes, rarely seeing their mother. At the age of seven the siblings were adopted by Starlett and Charles Isles; Isles credits his adoptive parents with providing the stability and love he needed to excel in sports.

== Early athletic career ==
Carlin Isles was a gifted American football and track and field athlete while attending Jackson High School (Massillon, Ohio). Isles holds the school records in the long jump, 100 meter, 200 meter, and 400 meter events at Jackson. He was also a part of the record holding 4 × 200 m relay team at Jackson High School. His 2007 100m school record breaking time was 10.58 seconds which was also a county record at that time. Carlin was a two-time, back-to-back OATCCC Indoor State Champion in high school in the 60m dash running 6.83 seconds which was a Division I meet record up until March 2012. He was a state runner-up in the 200m dash his junior year and runner-up in the long jump and 100m dash his senior year in addition to being third in the state in the 100m dash his junior year. In his senior year at Jackson High School, Isles ran a 4.28 second, electronically timed 40 yard dash. Carlin was an all-conference, all-county football player as well.

Isles continued running track and playing American football while enrolled at Ashland University where he was an All-American in the 60m dash and ran a personal best of 6.68 seconds which is a school record. He holds freshman class records in the 100m dash and 200m dash (indoor and outdoor). On the football field, Carlin was an All-GLIAC selection and holds school records for most kickoff return yardage in a game (174 yards) and longest kickoff return for TD (100 yards)

Before taking up rugby in 2012, Isles ranked as the 36th fastest sprinter in the United States with a 100 metres outdoor legal personal best of 10.15 seconds (and a windy 10.13 s).

== Rugby career ==
Isles took up the sport of rugby in 2012. He was encouraged to begin playing rugby by Miles Craigwell, another crossover athlete from American football who played for the United States national team. Isles played his club rugby with the Gentlemen of Aspen RFC, based in Aspen, Colorado.

Isles first caught the attention of the rugby media in summer of 2012 when Rugby Mag dubbed him "The Fastest Man in American Rugby". Isles played for the US national developmental team Atlantis in July 2012 at the Victoria 7s tournament.

=== National team ===
Isles debuted for the US national sevens team in October 2012 at the Gold Coast Sevens as a second-half substitute against New Zealand, and scored a try in his first minute on the pitch. Overall at that tournament he scored three tries and was one of the leading scorers for the U.S. team. Isles continued to be a regular scorer for the United States during the 2012–13 IRB Sevens World Series. Isles was quickly noticed for his incredible speed. A YouTube video posted on December 9, 2012, titled "Carlin Isles: Olympic Dream" further boosted his profile, as the video went viral and by December 23, 2012, and now has over 7 million views. The video closes with the words of long-time IRB commentator Nigel Starmer-Smith:

I've never seen anyone that quick on a rugby field ever ever, XVs or Sevens. I don't think anyone else has either.

Isles played for the US national team at the 2016 Summer Olympics in Rio de Janeiro, Brazil, where rugby sevens was introduced as an Olympic sport.

On February 29, 2020, Isles became the first ever USA player to score 200 tries. He completed this feat in a 19–17 victory match against Samoa during the 2019-20 World Rugby Sevens Series in Los Angeles.

=== Season by season ===
The following table shows Isles' scoring by season on the World Rugby Sevens Series, as of July 19, 2022.

WR Sevens Series
| WR 7s Season | Tries | U.S. Rank | World Rank |
|---|---|---|---|
| 2013–14 | 17 | 2nd | 31st |
| 2014–15 | 32 | 1st | 4th |
| 2015–16 | 16 | 4th | – |
| 2016–17 | 6 | 10th | – |
| 2017–18 | 49 | 1st | 1st |
| 2018–19 | 52 | 1st | 1st |
| 2019–20 | 22 | 1st | 2nd |
| 2020–21 | —N/a | —N/a | —N/a |
| 2021–22 | 10 | 5th | – |
| Career | 217 | 2nd | 8th |

=== Professional ===
Isles was under contract with Glasgow Warriors of the Pro12. In February 2014, he signed to play with Glasgow Warriors. He was a part of the Warriors 7's side that won the Melrose Sevens in April 2014. Isles did not make an appearance for Glasgow Warriors first XV that season but gained experience playing 15's with the Scottish Premiership side Ayr RFC, an amateur club in the Warriors district. At the end of the season Isles decided to leave the club and concentrate on playing rugby sevens in the 2016 Olympics. Isles was the leading try-scorer for the U.S. at that tournament.

== NFL career ==
He was signed by the Detroit Lions on December 26, 2013 to the team's practice squad. During a workout with the Detroit Lions Isles ran a time of 4.22 seconds in the 40-yard dash.

In February 2014, Isles left the Lions to take up a contract with the Glasgow Warriors.

== See also ==
- List of players who have converted from one football code to another
