= 2018 Paris Sevens =

- Sevens World Series XIX
- Host nation: France
- Date: 9–10 June 2018

Cup
- Champion: South Africa
- Runner-up: England
- Third: New Zealand

Challenge Trophy
- Winner: Argentina

Tournament details
- Matches played: 45
- Tries scored: 264 (average 5.87 per match)
- Most points: Nathan Hirayama (4)
- Most tries: Carlin Isles (6)

The 2018 Paris Sevens was the final event of the 2017–18 World Rugby Sevens Series and the eleventh edition of the France Sevens. The tournament was held between 9–10 June 2018 at Stade Jean-Bouin, Paris.

== Teams ==
The fifteen core teams will be participating in the tournament, along with one invited team, Ireland.

- Argentina
- Australia
- Canada
- England
- Fiji
- France
- Kenya
- New Zealand
- Russia
- Samoa
- Scotland
- South Africa
- Spain
- United States
- Wales
- Ireland

== Pool stages ==
All times in Central European Summer Time (UTC+02:00). The games as scheduled are as follows:

=== Pool A ===
Team	Pld	W	D	L	PF	PA	PD	Pts
Fiji	3	2	0	1	80	51	+29	7
New Zealand	3	2	0	1	63	48	+15	7
Kenya	3	2	0	1	51	53	–2	7
Samoa	3	0	0	3	39	81	–42	3

9 June 2018	New Zealand	24–5	Kenya	Stade Jean-Bouin, Paris
10:28	Try: Collier (2) 3'm, 5'm Baker 6'c Mikkelson 7'c Con: Baker (1/3) 7'; Ravouvou (1/1) 8'		Try: Ambaka 1'm Con: Agero (0/1)	Referee: Jérémy Rozier (France)

9 June 2018	Fiji	35–12	Samoa	Stade Jean-Bouin, Paris
10:50	Try: Mocenacagi 2'c Nasoko 4'c Kunatani 7'c Veremalua (2) 12'c, 14'c Con: Ravouvou (2/2) 2', 5'; Nasilasila (3/3) 8', 12', 14'		Try: Falaniko 6'm Solia 7'c Con: Falaniko (1/2) 7'	Referee: James Doleman (New Zealand)

9 June 2018	New Zealand	22–17	Samoa	Stade Jean-Bouin, Paris
13:24	Try: Molia (2) 2'm, 5'c Baker 6'm Ware 10'm Con: Baker (1/4) 5'		Try: Alofipo 3'c Tuatagaloa 7'm Fomai 11'm Con: Alosio (1/3) 3'	Referee: Damián Schneider (Argentina)

9 June 2018	Fiji	19–22	Kenya	Stade Jean-Bouin, Paris
13:46	Try: Kunatani 7'c Vakurunabili 13'm Nasoko 14'c Con: Nacuqu (1/) 7'; Ravouvou (1/2) 14'; Cards: Sau (yellow card) 10' to 12'		Try: Injera 2'm Ambaka 5'm Amonde 6'm Ombasa 11'c Con: Agero (1/4) 11'	Referee: Craig Evans (Wales)

9 June 2018	Kenya	24–10	Samoa	Stade Jean-Bouin, Paris
18:52	Try: Odhiambo (2) 2'm, 7'm Injera 8'c Tanga 12'c Con: Agero (1/3) 8'; Lugonzo (1/1) 12'		Try: Afamasaga 4'm Perez 14'm Con: Alosio (0/1); Falaniko (0/1); Cards: Alosio (yellow card) 9' to 11'	Referee: Sam Grove-White (Scotland)

9 June 2018	Fiji	26–17	New Zealand	Stade Jean-Bouin, Paris
19:14	Try: Nasoko 1'm Mocenacagi 3'c Ravouvou 7'c Tuwai 8'c Con: Ravouvou (2/3) 3', 7'; Nasilasila (1/1) 9'; Cards: Sau (yellow card) 5' to 7'		Try: Curry 5'm, 12'm Rayasi 10'c Con: Curry (1/1) 10'; Baker (0/1); Nareki (0/1)	Referee: Richard Haughton (England)

=== Pool B ===
Team	Pld	W	D	L	PF	PA	PD	Pts
South Africa	3	2	0	1	61	33	+28	7
Canada	3	2	0	1	59	49	+10	7
Scotland	3	2	0	1	45	52	–7	7
Russia	3	0	0	3	40	71	–31	3

9 June 2018	Canada	33–7	Russia	Stade Jean-Bouin, Paris
9:44	Try: Hirayama 2'c Jones 7'c Douglas 7'c Fuailefau 10'm Cejvanovic 13'c Con: Hirayama (4/5) 3', 7', 8', 13'		Try: Babaev 14'c Con: Ianiushkin (1/1) 14'	Referee: Matthew Rodden (Hong Kong)

9 June 2018	South Africa	12–14	Scotland	Stade Jean-Bouin, Paris
10:06	Try: Geduld 6'c Senatla 12'm Con: Geduld (1/2) 6'		Try: Fergusson 4'c Elms 14'c Con: Fergusson (2/2) 4', 14'	Referee: Damián Schneider (Argentina)

9 June 2018	Canada	26–14	Scotland	Stade Jean-Bouin, Paris
12:40	Try: Douglas (3) 4'm, 7'c, 10'c Hirayama 9'c Con: Hirayama (3/4) 7', 9', 11'		Try: McFarland 3'c Elms 14'c Con: Fergusson (2/2) 3', 14'	Referee: Jérémy Rozier (France)

9 June 2018	South Africa	21–19	Russia	Stade Jean-Bouin, Paris
13:02	Try: Kok 4'c Soyizwapi 7'c Senatla 13'c Con: Geduld (2/2) 5', 7'; Human (1/1) 14'		Try: Ostroushko 0'c, 6'c Gostyuzhev 11'm Con: Gaisin (2/3) 0', 6'	Referee: Nori Hashimoto (Japan)

9 June 2018	Russia	14–17	Scotland	Stade Jean-Bouin, Paris
18:08	Try: Davydov (2) 7'c, 14'c Con: Gaisin (1/1) 7'; Ianiushkin (1/1) 14'		Try: Graham (2) 2'm, 12'm Fergusson 13'c Con: Fergusson (1/3) 14'	Referee: Paulo Duarte (Portugal)

9 June 2018	South Africa	28–0	Canada	Stade Jean-Bouin, Paris
18:30	Try: Oosthuizen 3'c Kok 6'c Human 7'c Senatla 11'c Con: Human (3/3) 4', 7', 8'; Geduld (1/1) 12'		Cards: Braid (yellow card) 5' to 7'	Referee: James Doleman (New Zealand)

=== Pool C ===
Team	Pld	W	D	L	PF	PA	PD	Pts
Ireland	3	2	1	0	57	38	+19	8
Spain	3	2	0	1	43	38	+5	7
Australia	3	1	0	2	53	51	+2	5
Wales	3	0	1	2	43	69	–26	4

9 June 2018	Australia	29–10	Wales	Stade Jean-Bouin, Paris
9:00	Try: Myers 0'c Longbottom 4'm, 9'm Quinn 7'm McNamara 11'c Con: Lucas (1/1) 1'; McNamara (1/1) 11'; Holland (0/3); Cards: Longbottom (yellow card) 6' to 8'		Try: Jenkins (2) 6'm, 14'm Con: Williams (0/2)	Referee: Richard Haughton (England)

9 June 2018	Ireland	14–5	Spain	Stade Jean-Bouin, Paris
9:22	Try: Mollen 9'c Conroy 14'c Con: Cribbin (2/2) 10', 14'		Try: Pla 7'm Con: Hernández (0/1)	Referee: Nori Hashimoto (Japan)

9 June 2018	Australia	10–17	Spain	Stade Jean-Bouin, Paris
11:56	Try: O'Donnell 2'm Anstee 8'; Con: McNamara (0/1); Holland (0/1); Cards: Longbottom (yellow card) 7' to 9'		Try: Alonso 6'm Penalty Try 7'; Pla 11'm Con: Hernández (0/2)	Referee: Paulo Duarte (Portugal)

9 June 2018	Ireland	19–19	Wales	Stade Jean-Bouin, Paris
12:18	Try: Conroy 2'c Mollen 7'm Kennedy 11'c Con: Roche (2/3) 3', 11'; Cards: McHenry (yellow card) 1' to 3'		Try: Treharne 6'c Morgan 8'c Adam Thomas 12'm Con: Treharne (1/1) 6'; Williams (1/2) 8'	Referee: Sam Grove-White (Scotland)

9 June 2018	Wales	14–21	Spain	Stade Jean-Bouin, Paris
17:24	Try: Morgan 8'c Rosser 14'c Con: Treharne (2/2) 8', 14'		Try: Sainz-Trapaga 3'c Fontes 6'c Hernández 9'c Con: Hernández (3/3) 4', 7', 9'; Cards: Villanueva (yellow card) 2' to 4'	Referee: Damián Schneider (Argentina)

9 June 2018	Ireland	24–14	Australia	Stade Jean-Bouin, Paris
17:46	Try: Kennedy 5'c Roche (2) 7'c, 9'm Leavy 14'm Con: Roche (2/4) 5', 7'		Try: Holland 2'c Longbottom 11'c Con: Holland (1/1) 3'; McNamara (1/1) 11'	Referee: Craig Evans (Wales)

=== Pool D ===
Team	Pld	W	D	L	PF	PA	PD	Pts
United States	3	2	1	0	73	40	+33	8
England	3	2	1	0	77	61	+16	8
France	3	1	0	2	61	80	–19	5
Argentina	3	0	0	3	52	82	–30	3

9 June 2018	United States	26–7	Argentina	Stade Jean-Bouin, Paris
11:12	Try: Iosefo 0'm Tomasin (2) 5'c, 11'c Isles 13'c Con: Hughes (2/3) 6', 13'; Tomasin (1/1) 12'		Try: Provenzano 14'c Con: Bazan Velez (1/1) 14'	Referee: Craig Evans (Wales)

9 June 2018	England	28–21	France	Stade Jean-Bouin, Paris
11:34	Try: Lindsay-Hague 0'c Waddleton 3'c Olowofela 11'c Burgess 14'c Con: Mitchell (4/4) 1', 4', 11', 14'		Try: Bly 1'c Riva 5'c Veredamu 7'c Con: Barraque (3/3) 2', 6', 8'	Referee: Sam Grove-White (Scotland)

9 June 2018	United States	26–12	France	Stade Jean-Bouin, Paris
14:08	Try: Niua 4'c Isles (2) 7'c, 14'm Tomasin 8'c Con: Hughes (3/4) 4', 7', 8'		Try: Parez 0'c Con: Barraque (1/2) 1'; Cards: Bly (yellow card) 2' to 4'	Referee: Richard Haughton (England)

9 June 2018	England	28–19	Argentina	Stade Jean-Bouin, Paris
14:30	Try: Glover 0'c Mitchell 3'c Norton 10'c Olowofela 12'c Con: Mitchell (3/3) 0', 4', 13'; Bibby (1/1) 10'		Try: Moroni 6'c Gonzalez 7'm Bazan Velez 7'c Con: Revol (2/3) 6', 8'	Referee: James Doleman (New Zealand)

9 June 2018	Argentina	26–28	France	Stade Jean-Bouin, Paris
19:36	Try: Gonzalez 4'c Revol 10'm Bazan Velez 13'c Osadczuk 14'c Con: Revol (1/2) 4'; Bazan Velez (2/2) 13', 14'		Try: Veredamu 0'c Barraque (2) 2', 8'; Bonnefond 7'c Con: Barraque (4/4) 0', 2', 7', 8'; Cards: Barraque (yellow card) 13' to 14'	Referee: Matthew Rodden (Hong Kong)

9 June 2018	England	21–21	United States	Stade Jean-Bouin, Paris
19:58	Try: Lindsay-Hague 1'c Glover 4'c Olowofela 8'c Con: Mitchell (2/2) 1', 5'; Bibby (1/1) 9'; Cards: Hayter (yellow card) 14' to 14'		Try: Niua 2'c Hughes 13'c Williams 14'c Con: Hughes (3) 3', 13', 14'	Referee: Jérémy Rozier (France)

== Knockout stage ==
=== 13th Place ===
Semi-finals
10 June 2018 – 11:51 – Stade Jean-Bouin, Paris
Kenya	26
Russia	14
10 June 2018 – 12:13 – Stade Jean-Bouin, Paris
Samoa	19
Scotland	24

13th Place Final
10 June 2018 – 14:57 – Stade Jean-Bouin, Paris
Kenya	21
Scotland	20

Matches

Semi-finals

10 June 2018	Kenya	26–14	Russia	Stade Jean-Bouin, Paris
11:51	Try: Agero (2) 2'm, 14'c Ombasa 6'c Lugonzo 9'c Con: Agero (3/4) 7', 9', 14'		Try: Davydov 10'c Lazarenko 12'c Con: Ianiushkin (1/1) 11'; Gaisin (1/1) 13'	Referee: Nori Hashimoto (Japan)

10 June 2018	Samoa	19–24	Scotland	Stade Jean-Bouin, Paris
12:13	Try: Timo Ah-Sui 1'm Fomai 3'c Afamasaga 7'c Con: Alosio (2/3) 3', 7'		Try: Farndale 8'c Elms 9'm McFarland 10'm Godsmark 13'c Con: Fergusson (2/4) 8', 14'	Referee: Jérémy Rozier (France)

13th Place Final

10 June 2018	Kenya	21–20	Scotland	Stade Jean-Bouin, Paris
14:57	Try: Ambaka 4'c Injera 7'c Humwa 11'c Con: Agero (3/3) 5', 7', 12'		Try: Farndale (2) 0'm, 13'm Nayacavou 2'm Fergusson 8'm Con: Fergusson (0/3); Elms (0/1); Cards: Nayacavou (yellow card) 3' to 5'	Referee: Nori Hashimoto (Japan)

=== Challenge Trophy ===
Quarter-finals
10 June 2018 – 8:45 – Stade Jean-Bouin, Paris
Kenya	12
Argentina	19
10 June 2018 – 9:07 – Stade Jean-Bouin, Paris
Australia	14
Russia	5
10 June 2018 – 9:29 – Stade Jean-Bouin, Paris
France	19
Samoa	7
10 June 2018 – 9:51 – Stade Jean-Bouin, Paris
Scotland	5
Wales	28

Semi-finals
10 June 2018 – 12:35 – Stade Jean-Bouin, Paris
Argentina	24
Australia	19
10 June 2018 – 12:57 – Stade Jean-Bouin, Paris
France	26
Wales	28

Challenge Trophy Final
10 June 2018 – 15:19 – Stade Jean-Bouin, Paris
Argentina	33
Wales	26

Matches

Quarter-finals

10 June 2018	Kenya	12–19	Argentina	Stade Jean-Bouin, Paris
8:45	Try: Amonde 2'm Tanga 6'c Con: Tanga (1/1) 6'; Lugonzo (0/1); Cards: Ambaka (yellow card) 9' to 11'; Ombasa (yellow card) 12' to 14'		Try: Dominguez 4'c Rosas Paz 9'c Gonzalez 12'c Con: Revol (1/2) 5'; Bazan Velez (1/1) 10'	Referee: Jérémy Rozier (France)

10 June 2018	Australia	14–5	Russia	Stade Jean-Bouin, Paris
9:07	Try: Holland 3'c Myers 8'c Con: Holland (2/2) 4', 8'		Try: Galinovsky 12'; Con: Gaisin (0/1); Cards: Davydov (yellow card) 7' to 9'; Lazarenko (yellow card) 14' to 14'	Referee: Matthew Rodden (Hong Kong)

10 June 2018	France	19–7	Samoa	Stade Jean-Bouin, Paris
9:29	Try: Veredamu 1'c Riva 6'c Bouraoua 9'c Con: Barraque (1/2) 6'; Riva (1/1) 9'		Try: Perez 3'c Con: Alosio (1/1) 3'; Cards: Perez (red card) 6'	Referee: Paulo Duarte (Portugal)

10 June 2018	Scotland	5–28	Wales	Stade Jean-Bouin, Paris
9:51	Try: Godsmark 4'; Con: Fergusson (0/1)		Try: Treharne 2'c Rosser 7'c Williams 9'c Jenkins 12'c Con: Treharne (2/2) 2', 9'; Williams (2/2) 8', 12'; Cards: Rosser (yellow card) 3' to 5'	Referee: Damián Schneider (Argentina)

Semi-finals

10 June 2018	Argentina	24–19	Australia	Stade Jean-Bouin, Paris
12:35	Try: Rosas Paz (2) 5'c, 7'm Bazan Velez 11'c Provenzano 13'm Con: Bazan Velez (2/3) 6', 12'		Try: Dylan Pietsch (2) 1'm, 9'c McNamara 14'c Con: Holland (2/3) 9', 14'	Referee: Paulo Duarte (Portugal)

10 June 2018	France	26–28	Wales	Stade Jean-Bouin, Paris
12:57	Try: Bly 6'c Siega 8'm Veredamu 10'c Berenguel 14'c Con: Riva (1/1) 7'; Barraque (2/3) 10', 14'		Try: Morgan (2) 2'c, 3'c Williams 7'c Talbot-Davies 13'c Con: Treharne (2/2) 2', 4', 8', 13'	Referee: Matthew Rodden (Hong Kong)

Challenge Trophy Final

10 June 2018	Argentina	33–26	Wales	Stade Jean-Bouin, Paris
15:19	Try: Provenzano 4'c Mare 5'm Penalty Try 7'; Bazan Velez 7'c Moroni 14'c Con: Bazan Velez (2/3) 4', 7'; Revol (1/1) 14'		Try: Luke Morgan 6'c Jenkins (2) 9'm, 11'c Talbot-Davies 13'c Con: Treharne (3/4) 6', 11', 13'; Cards: Will Talbot-Davies (yellow card) 7' to 9'	Referee: Jérémy Rozier (France)

=== 5th Place ===
Semi-finals
10 June 2018 – 13:19 – Stade Jean-Bouin, Paris
Fiji	38
Ireland	5
10 June 2018 – 13:41 – Stade Jean-Bouin, Paris
United States	28
Spain	7

5th Place Final
10 June 2018 – 18:07 – Stade Jean-Bouin, Paris
Fiji	28
United States	7

Matches

Semi-finals

10 June 2018	Fiji	38–5	Ireland	Stade Jean-Bouin, Paris
13:19	Try: Nasilasila 4'c Naduva 7'm Dranisinukula (2) 7'c, 9'm Tuwai 13'c Nacuqu 14'c Con: Nasilasila (2/4) 4', 8'; Nacuqu (1/1) 13'; Ravouvou (1/1) 14'		Try: Leavy 6'm Con: Roche (0/1); Cards: Mollen (yellow card) 13' to 14'	Referee: Craig Evans (Wales)

10 June 2018	United States	28–7	Spain	Stade Jean-Bouin, Paris
13:41	Try: Isles 4'c Iosefo 12'c Thompson 13'c Tomasin 14'c Con: Hughes (3/3) 5', 12', 13'; Tomasin (1/1) 14'		Try: Hernández 6'c Con: Hernández (1/1) 7'	Referee: Matthew Rodden (Hong Kong)

5th Place Final

10 June 2018	Fiji	28–7	United States	Stade Jean-Bouin, Paris
18:07	Try: Kunatani 0'c Mocenacagi 6'c Naduva (2) 11'c, 14'c Con: Ravouvou (2/2) 1', 7'; Nasilasila (1/1) 12'; Nacuqu (1/1) 14'; Cards: Vakurunabili (yellow card) 8' to 10'		Try: Isles 2'c Con: Niua (1/1) 3'	Referee: Richard Haughton (England)

=== Cup ===
Quarter-finals
10 June 2018 – 10:13 – Stade Jean-Bouin, Paris
Fiji	17
England	19
10 June 2018 – 10:35 – Stade Jean-Bouin, Paris
Ireland	5
Canada	19
10 June 2018 – 10:57 – Stade Jean-Bouin, Paris
United States	7
New Zealand	33
10 June 2018 – 11:19 – Stade Jean-Bouin, Paris
South Africa	15 (a.e.t.)
Spain	10

Semi-finals
10 June 2018 – 14:03 – Stade Jean-Bouin, Paris
England	26
Canada	12
10 June 2018 – 14:25 – Stade Jean-Bouin, Paris
New Zealand	12
South Africa	24

Cup Final
10 June 2018 – 18:54 – Stade Jean-Bouin, Paris
England	14
South Africa	24
Bronze Medal Match
10 June 2018 – 18:29 – Stade Jean-Bouin, Paris
Canada	5
New Zealand	38

Matches

Quarter-finals

10 June 2018	Fiji	17–19	England	Stade Jean-Bouin, Paris
10:13	Try: Sau 1'm Ravouvou 6'c Tuwai 7'm Con: Ravouvou (1/2) 7'; Nasilasila (0/1)		Try: Glover 3'c Norton 9'c Mitchell 14'm Con: Mitchell (1/2) 3'; Bibby (1/1) 9'	Referee: Sam Grove-White (Scotland)

10 June 2018	Ireland	5–19	Canada	Stade Jean-Bouin, Paris
10:35	Try: Conroy 7'm Con: Roche (0/1); Cards: Daly (yellow card) 1' to 3'		Try: Hirayama 2'm Kay 5'c Jones 9'c Con: Hirayama (2/3) 5', 10'	Referee: Richard Haughton (England)

10 June 2018	United States	7–33	New Zealand	Stade Jean-Bouin, Paris
10:57	Try: Isles 4'c Con: Hughes (1/1) 5'		Try: Curry 1'c Rayasi (2) 6'c, 10'm Ware (2) 7'c, 8'; Con: Baker (4/5) 1', 7', 7', 9'; Cards: Simonsson (yellow card) 13' to 14'	Referee: Craig Evans (Wales)

10 June 2018	South Africa	15–10 (a.e.t.)	Spain	Stade Jean-Bouin, Paris
11:19	Try: Human 2'm Sage 11'm Geduld 19'; Con: Human (0/2)		Try: Pla 4'm Sainz-Trapaga 13'm Con: Hernández (0/2); Cards: Fontes (yellow card) 0' to 2'; Martín (yellow card) 10' to 12'	Referee: James Doleman (New Zealand)

Semi-finals

10 June 2018	England	26–12	Canada	Stade Jean-Bouin, Paris
14:03	Try: Norton 1'c Oliver Lindsay-Hague (2) 5'c, 8'm Bowen 11'c Con: Mitchell (2/2) 2', 12'; Bibby (1/2) 5'		Try: Hirayama 3'c Kay 7'm Con: Hirayama (1/2) 3'	Referee: Damián Schneider (Argentina)

10 June 2018	New Zealand	14–24	South Africa	Stade Jean-Bouin, Paris
14:25	Try: Nareki 12'm Ravouvou 14'c Con: Nareki (1/2) 12'		Try: Kok 0'm Human (2) 8'c, 13'c Nel 10'm Con: Human (1/3) 8'; Geduld (1/1) 13'	Referee: Sam Grove-White (Scotland)

Bronze Medal Match

10 June 2018	Canada	5–38	New Zealand	Stade Jean-Bouin, Paris
18:29	Try: Fuailefau 2'm Con: Hirayama (0/1)		Try: Nareki 0'm Molia 6'm Collier 7'c Ravouvou 9'c Simonsson 12'c Dickson 14'c Con: Rokolisoa (4/6) 8', 10', 12', 14'	Referee: Paulo Duarte (Portugal)

Cup Final

10 June 2018	England	14–24	South Africa	Stade Jean-Bouin, Paris
18:54	Try: Lindsay-Hague 4'c Norton 5'c Con: Mitchell (2/2) 4', 5'		Try: Kok 2'c Oosthuizen 9'c Human 11'c Con: Geduld (2/2) 3', 9', 11'; Pen: Geduld (1/1) 13'	Referee: Craig Evans (Wales)

== Tournament placings ==
Place	Team	Points
1st place, gold medalist(s)	South Africa	22
2nd place, silver medalist(s)	England	19
3rd place, bronze medalist(s)	New Zealand	17
4	Canada	15
5	Fiji	13
6	United States	12
7	Ireland	10
7	Spain	10

Place	Team	Points
9	Argentina	8
10	Wales	7
11	Australia	5
11	France	5
13	Kenya	3
14	Scotland	2
15	Russia	1
15	Samoa	1

Source: World Rugby

== Players ==
=== Scoring leaders ===
Tries scored
Rank	Player	Tries
1	Carlin Isles	6
2	Dewald Human	5
	Luke Morgan	5
	Oliver Lindsay-Hague	5
5	Dan Norton	4

Points scored
Rank	Player	Points
1	Nathan Hirayama	40
2	Tom Mitchell	38
3	Lautaro Bazan Velez	36
4	Dewald Human	35
5	Luke Treharne	34

Source: World Rugby

=== Dream Team ===
The following seven players were selected to the tournament Dream Team at the conclusion of the tournament:

Forwards	Backs
Harry Glover; Scott Curry; Phil Burgess	(England) Tom Mitchell; Dewald Human; Justin Douglas; Pol Pla

== See also ==
- 2018 France Women's Sevens

World Sevens Series XIX
Preceded by 2018 London Sevens	2018 Paris Sevens	Succeeded by None (last event)
France Sevens
Preceded by 2017 Paris Sevens	2018 Paris Sevens	Succeeded by 2019 Paris Sevens
