= 2018 London Sevens =

- Sevens World Series XIX
- Host nation: England
- Date: 2–3 June 2018

Cup
- Champion: Fiji
- Runner-up: South Africa
- Third: Ireland

Challenge Trophy
- Winner: Kenya

Tournament details
- Matches played: 45
- Tries scored: 298 (average 6.62 per match)
- Most points: (Kenya) Collins Injera (42)
- Most tries: (United States) Carlin Isles (8) (Kenya) Collins Injera (8) (England) Dan Norton (8) (Ireland) Jordan Conroy (8)

The 2018 London Sevens was the penultimate event of the 2017–18 World Rugby Sevens Series and the eighteenth edition of the London Sevens. The tournament was held at Twickenham Stadium, London on 2–3 June 2018. Fiji won the tournament by defeating South Africa 21–17 in the final. However it was Ireland who stole the show, finishing in third place in their first World Series tournament since 2004. Ireland thus became the first invitational side to reach the semi-finals and the podium of a World Rugby Sevens Series event.

== Teams ==
The fifteen core teams played in the tournament, along with one invited team, Ireland.

- Argentina
- Australia
- Canada
- England
- Fiji
- France
- Kenya
- New Zealand
- Russia
- Samoa
- Scotland
- South Africa
- Spain
- United States
- Wales
- Ireland

== Pool stages ==
All times in British Summer Time (UTC+01:00). The games as scheduled are as follows:

=== Pool A ===
Team	Pld	W	D	L	PF	PA	PD	Pts
Fiji	3	3	0	0	94	38	+56	9
New Zealand	3	2	0	1	67	44	+23	7
Argentina	3	1	0	2	46	83	–37	5
Scotland	3	0	0	3	43	85	–42	3

2 June 2018	New Zealand	24–12	Scotland	Twickenham Stadium
10:58	Try: Baker 1'c Molia 3'c Etene Nanai-Seturo; Rayasi 12'; Con: Baker (2/4) 4', 13'		Try: Graham 6'c Cuthbert 14'; Con: Lowe (1/2) 6'; Cards: Cuthbert (yellow card) 11' to 13'	Referee: Jérémy Rozier (France)

2 June 2018	Fiji	28–19	Argentina	Twickenham Stadium
11:20	Try: Ravouvou 4'c Mocenacagi 7'c Nacuqu 13'c Nasilasila 14'c Con: Ravouvou (3/3) 4', 7', 13'; Nacuqu (1/1) 14'		Try: Osadczuk 2'm Gonzalez 6'c Bazan Velez 9'c Con: Revol (2/3) 6', 9'; Pen: Revol (0/1)	Referee: James Doleman (New Zealand)

2 June 2018	New Zealand	36–5	Argentina	Twickenham Stadium
14:04	Try: Baker 3'm Mikkelson 6'c Curry 7'm Rayasi 7'c Nanai-Seturo 11'm Nareki 14'c Con: Baker (2/4) 6', 7'; Nareki (1/1) 14'; Rokolosoa (0/1); Cards: Rokolosoa (yellow card) 14' to 14'		Try: Bazan Velez 13'm Con: Mare (0/1)	Referee: Craig Evans (Wales)

2 June 2018	Fiji	39–12	Scotland	Twickenham Stadium
14:26	Try: Ravouvou (2) 0'm, 4'm Sau 7'm Radradra 7'c Mocenacagi 11'c Tuwai 12'm Veremalua 14'm Con: Nasilasila (2/4) 8'c, 12'c Ravouvou (0/3)		Try: Graham 2'm Beattie 9'c Con: Lowe (1/2) 10'; Cards: Lowe (yellow card) 5' to 7'	Referee: Matthew Rodden (Hong Kong)

2 June 2018	Scotland	19–22	Argentina	Twickenham Stadium
17:10	Try: Farndale 1'c Graham 5'm McFarland 10'c Con: Lowe (2/3) 2', 11'		Try: Osadczuk (2) 7'm, 13'm Sábato 8'm Gonzalez 9'c Con: Álvarez (1/1) 9'; Mare (0/2); Bazan Velez (0/1)	Referee: Richard Haughton (England)

2 June 2018	Fiji	27–7	New Zealand	Twickenham Stadium
17:32	Try: Nasilasila 0'c Tuisova (2) 2'm, 8'm Radradra 5'm Nacuqu 11'; Con: Nasilasila (1/4) 0'; Ravouvou (0/1)		Try: Dickson 14'c Con: Baker (1/1) 14'	Referee: Sam Grove-White (Scotland)

=== Pool B ===
Team	Pld	W	D	L	PF	PA	PD	Pts
Australia	3	3	0	0	81	41	+40	9
Ireland	3	1	0	2	64	64	0	5
Wales	3	1	0	2	45	63	–18	5
Spain	3	1	0	2	56	78	–22	5

2 June 2018	Spain	24–12	Wales	Twickenham Stadium
10:14	Try: Martín 1'm Sainz-Trapaga 7'c Carter 10'c de Juan 13'm Con: Hernández (2/4) 7', 10'		Try: Bagshaw 2'm Morgan 5'c Con: Treharne (1/2) 5'	Referee: Damián Schneider (Argentina)

2 June 2018	Australia	33–7	Ireland	Twickenham Stadium
10:36	Try: Connor 2'c Longbottom 7'c Myers 9'm O'Donnell 11'c Reilly 14'c Con: Lucas (2/3) 2', 8'; Holland (1/1) 11', 14'		Try: Conroy 4'c Con: Roche (1/1) 5'	Referee: Craig Joubert (South Africa)

2 June 2018	Spain	10–38	Ireland	Twickenham Stadium
13:20	Try: Alonso 7'm Carter 14'm Con: Hernández (0/2)		Try: Conroy (2) 1'm, 8'c O'Brien (2) 3'c, 10'c McNulty 5'c Kennedy 12'm Con: Roche (4/5) 3', 5', 8', 10'; Dardis (0/1)	Referee: Richard Haughton (England)

2 June 2018	Australia	20–12	Wales	Twickenham Stadium
13:42	Try: Anderson 3'm Reilly (2) 6'm, 8'm O'Donnell 12'm Con: Porch (0/4)		Try: Harries 1'm Bagshaw 7'c Con: Treharne (1/2) 7'; Cards: Morgan (yellow card) 5' to 7'	Referee: Sam Grove-White (Scotland)

2 June 2018	Wales	21–19	Ireland	Twickenham Stadium
16:26	Try: Thomas 2'c Treharne (2) 5', 7'; Con: Treharne (3/3) 2', 5', 7'		Try: Conroy 0'm McNulty 9'c O'Brien 14'c Con: Roche (2/3) 10', 14'	Referee: Nori Hashimoto (Japan)

2 June 2018	Australia	28–22	Spain	Twickenham Stadium
16:48	Try: Anderson 0'c Porch 5'c, 8'c Pincus 7'c Con: Lucas (3/3) 0', 5', 7'; Porch (1/1) 8'		Try: Sainz-Trapaga (2) 2'm, 4'c Hernández 10'm Alonso 12'm Con: Hernández (1/4) 4'	Referee: Paulo Duarte (Portugal)

=== Pool C ===
Team	Pld	W	D	L	PF	PA	PD	Pts
United States	3	2	1	0	88	47	+41	8
England	3	2	0	1	86	43	+43	7
Kenya	3	1	1	1	55	78	–23	6
France	3	0	0	3	35	96	–61	3

2 June 2018	Kenya	19–19	United States	Twickenham Stadium
11:42	Try: Ambaka 10'c Injera (2) 11'c, 14'm Con: Agero (1/1) 10'; Lugonzo (1/2) 12'		Try: Isles 2'c Iosefo 5'c Barrett 12'm Con: Hughes (2/3) 3', 5'	Referee: Matthew Rodden (Hong Kong)

2 June 2018	England	34–0	France	Twickenham Stadium
12:04	Try: Davis 1'c Norton (2) 4'm, 9'm Lindsay-Hague (3) 5'c, 6'm, 13'm Con: Bibby (2/6) 1', 5'			Referee: Sam Grove-White (Scotland)

2 June 2018	Kenya	24–21	France	Twickenham Stadium
14:48	Try: Injera (2) 0'm, 14'm Ambaka 3'c Odhiambo 7'c Con: Lugonzo (2/3) 4', 7'; Agero (0/1)		Try: Parez (2) 2'c, 8'c Barry 11'c Con: Barraque (3/3) 2', 9', 11'	Referee: Damián Schneider (Argentina)

2 June 2018	England	14–31	United States	Twickenham Stadium
15:10	Try: Norton (2) 2'c, 6'c Con: Mitchell (2/2) 3', 6'; Cards: Norton (yellow card) 11' to 13'		Try: Barrett 0'm Niua 8'c Tomasin 10'c Isles (2) 11'c, 13'm Con: Hughes (3/5) 9', 10', 12'	Referee: James Doleman (New Zealand)

2 June 2018	United States	38–14	France	Twickenham Stadium
17:54	Try: Isles (3) 0'm, 5'c, 7'm Tomasin 4'c Iosefo 8'c Williams 11'c Con: Hughes (4/6) 4', 6', 9', 12'		Try: Bly 2'c Parez 14'c Con: Barraque (2/2) 2', 14'	Referee: Craig Evans (Wales)

2 June 2018	England	38–12	Kenya	Twickenham Stadium
18:16	Try: Lindsay-Hague (2) 4'c, 8'c Norton 6'm Ellery (2) 7'm, 9'c Hayter 11'c Con: Mitchell (4/6) 4', 8', 9', 12'		Try: Ambaka 2'c Humwa 14'm Con: Agero (1/1) 3'; Tanga 14'	Referee: Craig Joubert (South Africa)

=== Pool D ===
Team	Pld	W	D	L	PF	PA	PD	Pts
South Africa	2	2	0	1	60	28	+32	7
Canada	3	2	0	1	50	27	+23	7
Samoa	3	1	0	2	38	55	–17	5
Russia	3	1	0	2	39	77	–38	5

2 June 2018	Samoa	0–14	Canada	Twickenham Stadium
9:30			Try: Kaay 6'c Douglas 13'c Con: Hirayama (2/2) 7', 13'	Referee: Craig Evans (Wales)

2 June 2018	South Africa	31–0	Russia	Twickenham Stadium
9:52	Try: Sage 1'm Oosthuizen 2'c Soyizwapi 4'm Afrika 6'c Davids 11'c Con: Du Preez (3/5) 2', 6', 12'; Cards: Geduld (yellow card) 10' to 12'			Referee: Richard Haughton (England)

2 June 2018	Samoa	17–29	Russia	Twickenham Stadium
12:36	Try: Tuatagaloa 6'c Alosio 12'm Neli 14'm Con: Falaniko (0/1) 6'; Alosio (0/1); Tusitala (0/1)		Try: Ostroushko 3'c Gostyuzhev 7'm Sozonov 8'c Davydov 11'm Simplikevich 13'm Con: Gaisin (2/5) 3', 9'	Referee: Nori Hashimoto (Japan)

2 June 2018	South Africa	17–7	Canada	Twickenham Stadium
12:58	Try: Oosthuizen 2'c Snyman 10'm Kok 14'; Con: Du Preez (1/1) 2'; Afrika (0/2); Cards: Sage (yellow card) 7' to 9'		Try: Jones 5'c Con: Hirayama (1/1) 6'	Referee: Paulo Duarte (Portugal)

2 June 2018	Canada	29–10	Russia	Twickenham Stadium
15:42	Try: Hirayama 0'c Fuailefau (2) 2'm, 12'm Douglas 9'c Mullins 14'm Con: Hirayama (2/5) 1', 9'		Try: Zhivatov 5'm Galinovskiy 7'm Con: Gaisin (0/2)	Referee: Jérémy Rozier (France)

2 June 2018	South Africa	12–21	Samoa	Twickenham Stadium
16:04	Try: Bezuidenhout 5'm Seabelo Senatla 11'c Con: Geduld (1/2) 12'		Try: Motuga (2) 1'c, 7'c Perez 2'c Con: Falaniko (3/3) 1', 3', 7'	Referee: James Doleman (New Zealand)

== Knockout stage ==
=== 13th Place ===
Semi-finals
3 June 2018 – 12:36 – Twickenham Stadium
Samoa	26
Spain	10
3 June 2018 – 12:58 – Twickenham Stadium
Scotland	43
France	21

13th Place Final
3 June 2018 – 16:07 – Twickenham Stadium
Samoa	34
Scotland	10

Matches

Semi-finals

3 June 2018	Samoa	26–10	Spain	Twickenham Stadium, London
12:36	Try: Maliko 1'c Alofipo (2) 9'm, 10'c Motuga 12'c Con: Alosio (1/2) 1'; Perez (2/2) 10', 12'		Try: Pla 6'm Poggi 14'm Con: Hernández (0/2)	Referee: Sam Grove-White (Scotland)

3 June 2018	Scotland	43–21	France	Twickenham Stadium, London
12:58	Try: McLennan (2) 1'c, 6'c Elms (2) 3'm, 8'c, 9'c Farndale 7'm McFarland 12'm Con: Lowe (4/7) 2', 6', 8', 9'		Try: Bly 5'c Manevy 10'c Demai-Hamecher 14'c Con: Barraque (2/2) 5', 11', 14'	Referee: Paulo Duarte (Portugal)

13th Place Final

3 June 2018	Samoa	34–10	Scotland	Twickenham Stadium, London
16:07	Try: Alosio (2) 1'c, 5'm Solia (2) 3'm, 6'm Motuga 7'c Maliko; Con: Alosio (2/4) 2', 8'; Perez (0/1); Alofipo (0/1)		Try: Elms (2) 13'm, 14'; Con: Fergusson (0/2)	Referee: Damián Schneider (Argentina)

=== Challenge Trophy ===
Quarter-finals
3 June 2018 – 9:30 – Twickenham Stadium
Argentina	19
Samoa	14
3 June 2018 – 9:52 – Twickenham Stadium
Kenya	38
Spain	0
3 June 2018 – 10:14 – Twickenham Stadium
Russia	15 (a.e.t.)
Scotland	10
3 June 2018 – 10:36 – Twickenham Stadium
Wales	33
France	29

Semi-finals
3 June 2018 – 13:20 – Twickenham Stadium
Argentina	10
Kenya	42
3 June 2018 – 13:42 – Twickenham Stadium
Russia	12
Wales	27

Challenge Trophy Final
3 June 2018 – 16:32 – Twickenham Stadium
Kenya	33
Wales	19

Matches

Quarter-finals

3 June 2018	Argentina	19–14	Samoa	Twickenham Stadium, London
9:30	Try: Bazan Velez 2'c Mare 3'm Etchart 9'c Con: Bazan Velez (1/2) 2'; Mare 10'		Try: Motuga 5'c Fomai 8'c Con: Falaniko (2/2) 5', 8'	Referee: Craig Joubert (South Africa)

3 June 2018	Kenya	38–0	Spain	Twickenham Stadium, London
9:52	Try: Injera (2) 0'c, 13'; Amonde 3'c Ambaka 7'm Odhiambo (2) 7'c, 14'c Con: Agero (3/4) 0', 3', 8'; Tanga (1/2) 14'; Cards: Tanga (yellow card) 11' to 13'			Referee: Matthew Rodden (Hong Kong Rugby Football Union)

3 June 2018	Russia	15–10 (a.e.t.)	Scotland	Twickenham Stadium, London
10:14	Try: Lazarenko 6'm Sozonov 14'm Davydov 16'; Con: Gaisin (0/2); Cards: Ostroushko (yellow card) 9' to 11'		Try: Farndale (2) 3'm, 7'm Con: Lowe (0/2)	Referee: Nori Hashimoto (Japan)

3 June 2018	Wales	33–29	France	Twickenham Stadium, London
10:36	Try: Morgan 4'c, 7'c J Jenkins 5'c Harries 7'm Afon Bagshaw 9'c Con: TG Williams (4/5) 4', 5', 8', 9'		Try: Boudehent 1'm Bonnefond 2'c Bly (2) 11'm, 14'c Mignot 13'; Con: Barraque (2/5) 2', 14'	Referee: Paulo Duarte (Portugal)

Semi-finals

3 June 2018	Argentina	10–42	Kenya	Twickenham Stadium, London
13:20	Try: Dominguez 3'm Etchart 8'm Con: Revol (0/2)		Try: Injera 0'c Lugonzo 4'c Ambaka 7'c Odhiambo 10'c Tanga 12'c Amonde 14'c Con: Agero (6/6) 1', 4', 7', 10', 12', 14'	Referee: Jérémy Rozier (France)

3 June 2018	Russia	12–27	Wales	Twickenham Stadium, London
13:42	Try: Ostroushko 3'c Ianiushkin 11'm Con: Gaisin (1/2) 3'		Try: Morgan (2) 0'm, 5'm TG Williams 7'm Bagshaw 9'm Rosser 13'c Con: TG Williams (1/5) 14'	Referee: Matthew Rodden (Hong Kong Rugby Football Union)

Challenge Trophy Final

3 June 2018	Kenya	33–19	Wales	Twickenham Stadium, London
16:32	Try: Ambaka 3'c Oluoch (2) 5'c, 14'c Injera 7'c Agero 8'm Con: Agero (4/5) 4', 5', 7', 14'		Try: Bagshaw 2'c Morgan 6'c Rosser 10'm Con: TG Williams (2/3) 3', 6'	Referee: James Doleman (New Zealand)

=== 5th Place ===
Semi-finals
3 June 2018 – 14:04 – Twickenham Stadium
Canada	19
United States	27
3 June 2018 – 14:26 – Twickenham Stadium
New Zealand	38
Australia	7

5th Place Final
3 June 2018 – 17:07 – Twickenham Stadium
United States	5
New Zealand	26

Matches

Semi-finals

3 June 2018	Canada	19–27	United States	Twickenham Stadium, London
14:04	Try: Hammond 2'c Jones 6'm Douglas 8'c Con: Hirayama (2/3) 3', 8'		Try: Williams (2) 0'm, 7'm Isles 4'm Martin Iosefo 9'm Hughes 13'c Con: Hughes (1/5) 13'	Referee: James Doleman (New Zealand)

3 June 2018	New Zealand	38–7	Australia	Twickenham Stadium, London
14:26	Try: Baker 1'c Mikkelson 5'm Curry 6'c Ware (2) 8'c, 14'; Ng Shiu 10'm Con: Baker (2/4) 2', 6'; Rokolosoa (1/1) 8'; Nareki (1/1) 14'; Cards: Baker (yellow card) 7' to 9'		Try: Killingworth 9'c Con: Holland (1/1) 9'	Referee: Damián Schneider (Argentina)

5th Place Final

3 June 2018	United States	5–26	New Zealand	Twickenham Stadium, London
17:07	Try: Tomasin 10'; Con: Hughes (0/1)		Try: Ware 2'c Rayasi 3'; Rokolosoa 9'c Mikkelson 13'c Con: Baker (2/2) 2', 3'; Rokolosoa (1/1) 9'; Mikkelson (0/1)	Referee: Richard Haughton (England)

=== Cup ===
Quarter-finals
3 June 2018 – 10:58 – Twickenham Stadium
Fiji	40
Canada	7
3 June 2018 – 11:20 – Twickenham Stadium
United States	12
Ireland	22
3 June 2018 – 11:42 – Twickenham Stadium
South Africa	14
New Zealand	5
3 June 2018 – 12:04 – Twickenham Stadium
Australia	17
England	21

Semi-finals
3 June 2018 – 14:48 – Twickenham Stadium
Fiji	38
Ireland	12
3 June 2018 – 15:10 – Twickenham Stadium
South Africa	29
England	19

Cup Final
3 June 2018 – 17:57 – Twickenham Stadium
Fiji	21
South Africa	17
Bronze Medal Match
3 June 2018 – 17:32 – Twickenham Stadium
Ireland	21
England	19

Matches

Quarter-finals

3 June 2018	Fiji	40–7	Canada	Twickenham Stadium, London
10:58	Try: Radradra 2'c Mocenacagi 4'c Dranisinukula 7'c Nasoko 9'c Veremalua 12'; Nasilasila 14'c Con: Ravouvou (5/6) 2', 4', 8', 10', 14'		Try: Douglas 6'c Con: Hirayama (1/1) 7'	Referee: Damián Schneider (Argentina)

3 June 2018	United States	12–22	Ireland	Twickenham Stadium, London
11:20	Try: Iosefo 9'c Isles 13'm Con: Iosefo (1/1) 10'; Hughes (0/1)		Try: Conroy 2'c O’Donnell 4'm Keenan 6'm O'Brien 12'; Con: Roche (1/4) 3'	Referee: Richard Haughton (England)

3 June 2018	South Africa	14–5	New Zealand	Twickenham Stadium, London
11:42	Try: Oosthuizen 2'c Sage 9'c Con: Geduld (2/2) 2', 9'		Try: Collier 13'm Con: Mikkelson (0/1)	Referee: Craig Evans (Wales)

3 June 2018	Australia	17–21	England	Twickenham Stadium, London
12:04	Try: Anderson 3'c Longbottom 7'm O'Donnell 13'm Con: Holland (1/3) 3'		Try: Ellery 2'c Norton 9'c Davis 11'c Con: Mitchell (2/2) 2', 9', 12'	Referee: James Doleman (New Zealand)

Semi-finals

3 June 2018	Fiji	38–12	Ireland	Twickenham Stadium, London
14:48	Try: Sau (2) 1'c, 5'c Vakurunabili 4'm Tuisova 7'c Nacuqu (2) 10'c, 12'c Con: Ravouvou (2/3) 1', 6'; Nasoko (1/1) 7'; Nasilasila (1/2) 12'; Cards: Ravouvou (yellow card) 7' to 9'		Try: Kennedy 11'm Keenan 13'c Con: Roche (1/2) 13'	Referee: Craig Joubert (South Africa)

3 June 2018	South Africa	29–19	England	Twickenham Stadium, London
15:10	Try: Kok 2'c Snyman 6'm Senatla 7'; Gans 11'c Geduld 12'm Con: Geduld (2/5) 3', 11'		Try: Phil Burgess (2) 4'c, 9'c Dam Norton 14'm Con: Mitchell (2/2) 4', 10'; Dan Bibby (0/1)	Referee: Sam Grove-White (Scotland)

Bronze Medal Match

3 June 2018	Ireland	21–19	England	Twickenham Stadium, London
17:32	Try: Conroy (3) 0'c, 4'c, 13'c Con: Roche (2/2) 1', 5', 14'		Try: Bibby (2) 6'c, 7'm Norton 8'; Con: Mitchell (2/3) 6', 8'	Referee: Jérémy Rozier (France)

Cup Final

3 June 2018	Fiji	21–17	South Africa	Twickenham Stadium, London
17:57	Try: Tuisova 6'c Dranisinukula 7'c Veremalua 10'c Con: Nasilasila (3/3) 6', 8', 11'; Cards: Mocenacagi (yellow card) 0' to 2'		Try: Gans 2'c Nel 9'm Davids 13'm Con: Geduld (1/3) 2'	Referee: Craig Evans (Wales)

== Tournament placings ==
Place	Team	Points
1st place, gold medalist(s)	Fiji	22
2nd place, silver medalist(s)	South Africa	19
3rd place, bronze medalist(s)	Ireland	17
4	England	15
5	New Zealand	13
6	United States	12
7	Australia	10
7	Canada	10

Place	Team	Points
9	Kenya	8
10	Wales	7
11	Argentina	5
11	Russia	5
13	Samoa	3
14	Scotland	2
15	France	1
15	Spain	1

Source: World Rugby

== Players ==
=== Scoring leaders ===
Tries scored
Rank	Player	Tries
1	(United States) Carlin Isles	8
	(Kenya) Collins Injera	8
	(England) Dan Norton	8
	(Ireland) Jordan Conroy	8
5	(Wales) Luke Morgan	6

Points scored
Rank	Player	Points
1	(Kenya) Collins Injera	42
2	(United States) Carlin Isles	40
	(England) Dan Norton	40
	(Ireland) Jordan Conroy	40
5	(Fiji) Vatemo Ravouvou	36

Source: World Rugby

=== Dream Team ===
The following seven players were selected to the tournament Dream Team at the conclusion of the tournament:

Forwards	Backs
(England) Mike Ellery (Fiji) Paula Dranisinukula (South Africa) Dylan Sage	(Ireland) Jordan Conroy (Ireland) Mark Roche (Fiji) Josua Tuisova (Fiji) Semi Radradra

World Sevens Series XIX
Preceded by 2018 Singapore Sevens	2018 London Sevens	Succeeded by 2018 Paris Sevens
London Sevens
Preceded by 2017 London Sevens	2018 London Sevens	Succeeded by 2019 London Sevens
