= Rugby sevens at the 2018 Commonwealth Games – Men's tournament =

2018 Men's Commonwealth Rugby Sevens Tournament
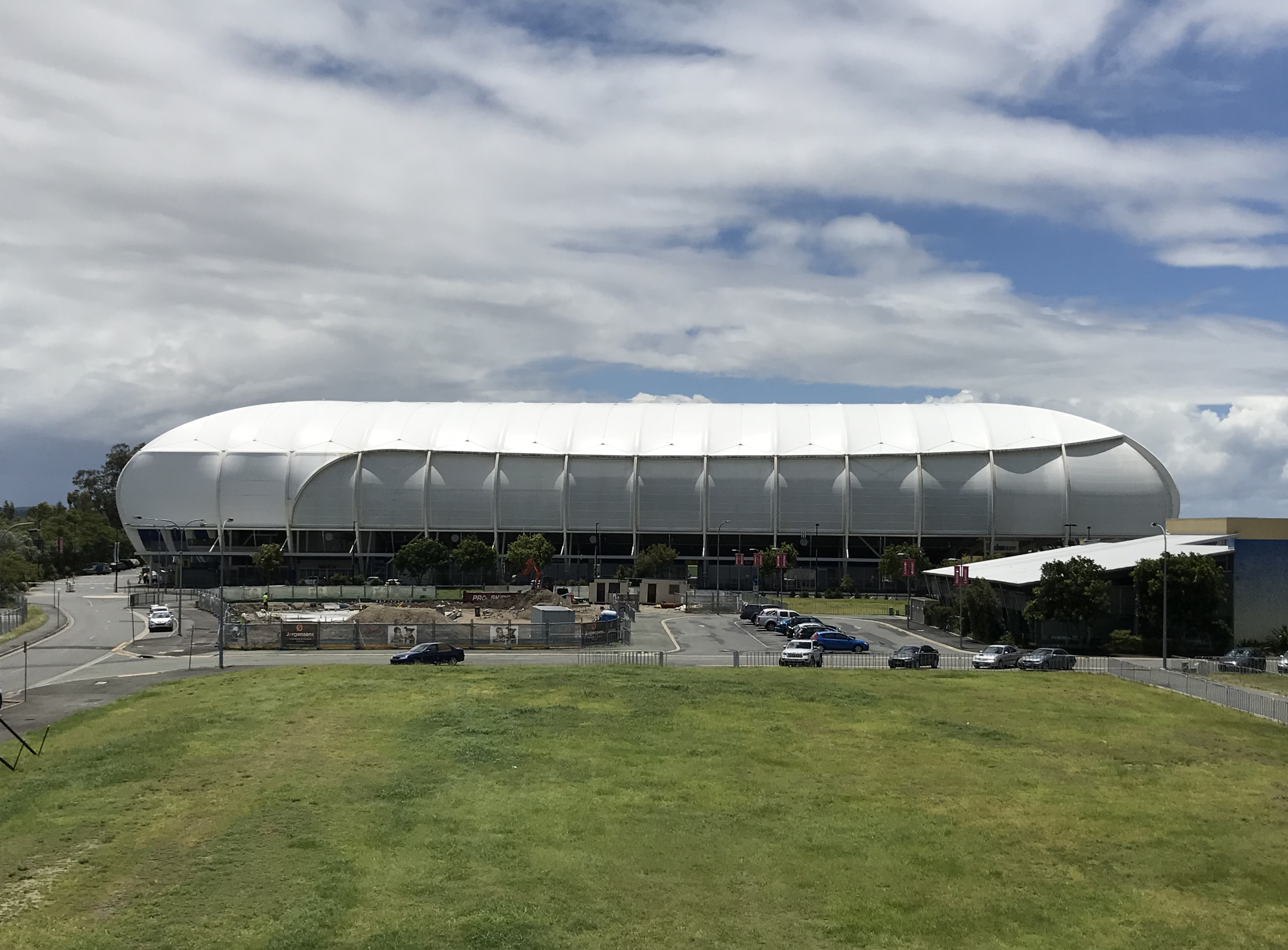
- View of the Robina Stadium, where the Rugby Sevens tournament took place

Tournament details
- Host: Australia
- Venue: Robina Stadium
- Date: 13–15 April 2018
- Teams: 16

Final positions
- Champions: New Zealand (5th title)
- Runner-up: Fiji
- Third place: England
- Fourth place: South Africa

Tournament statistics
- Matches played: 32

The men's rugby sevens tournament at the 2018 Commonwealth Games was the sixth time in history that the event has taken place since it started in 1998. The venue for the competition was Robina Stadium.

For the first time since 2002 the men's tournament saw some minor alterations to the format. The competition retained its 16 team first round pool stage format however the quarter-final stage was removed so only the teams who finished as pool winners went through to contest for the medals with teams who come runners-up in their pools going through the newly formed lower classification stage and all remaining teams who finished third and fourth respectively were eliminated.

== Qualification ==
Malaysia and Sri Lanka both qualified for the tournament via the 2017 Asia Rugby Sevens Series on 15 October 2017, finishing seventh and fourth respectively. On 26 November 2017, Jamaica qualified for the first time beating Guyana 24–28. The tournament being held in Mexico City, Mexico.

=== Qualified teams ===
Event	Date	Location	Teams	Qualified
Host Nation	11 November 2011	Basseterre, Saint Kitts	1	Australia
2016–17 World Rugby Sevens Series	2 Dec 2016 – 21 May 2017	Various	9	South Africa; England; Fiji; New Zealand; Scotland; Canada; Wales; Kenya; Samoa
2017 Africa Cup Sevens	6–7 October 2017	Kampala, Uganda	2	Uganda; Zambia
2017 Asia Rugby Sevens Series	1 September – 14 October 2017	Various	2	Sri Lanka; Malaysia
2017 Oceania Sevens Championship	10–11 November 2017	Suva, Fiji	1	Papua New Guinea
2017 RAN Sevens	25–26 November 2017	Mexico City, Mexico	1	Jamaica
Total			16	

== Competition schedule ==
The following is the competition schedule for the Men’s Rugby sevens competition:

P	Pool stage	CM	Classification matches	½	Semi-finals	B	Bronze Medal Match	F	Gold Medal Match

Event↓/Date →	Sat 14		Sun 15				
Event	M	E	M				
Men	P		CM	½	CM	B	F

== Match officials ==
World Rugby announced a panel of eight match officials on 21 February 2018 for the men's sevens.

- Craig Evans (Wales)
- Sam Grove-White (Scotland)
- Richard Haughton (England)
- Richard Kelly (New Zealand)
- Jordan Way (Australia)
- Damon Murphy (Australia)
- Rasta Rasivhenge (South Africa)
- Tevita Rokovereni (Fiji)

== Pool stage ==
In pool play, each team plays one match against the other three teams in the group.

Pool winners advance to the semi-finals, runners-up advance to the lower classification matches (for places 5 to 8) and the remaining teams are eliminated from competition.

On 1 February 2018, the pools for both the men's & women's tournaments were confirmed.

=== Pool A ===
Pos	Team	Pld	W	D	L	PF	PA	PD	Pts	Qualification
1	South Africa	3	3	0	0	121	5	+116	9	Semi-finals
2	Scotland	3	2	0	1	73	26	+47	7	Classification semi-finals
3	Papua New Guinea	3	1	0	2	31	84	−53	5	
4	Malaysia	3	0	0	3	5	115	−110	3	

Source: GC2018
Rules for classification: 1) Points; 2) Head-to-head result; 3) Point difference; 4) Points scored.

14 April 2018
11:43

Scotland	27–0	Papua New Guinea
Try: Farndale (2) 1' c, 8' m Graham 3' m Horne 5' m Fleming 14'; Con: Horne (1/1) 1'; Jackson (0/3)	(Gold Coast 2018)	Cards: Baramun (yellow card) 14'

Robina Stadium, Gold Coast
Referee: Tevita Rokovereni (Fiji)

14 April 2018
12:05

South Africa	43–0	Malaysia
Try: Sage 2' m Geduld (2) 3' m, 9' c Du Preez 4' c Snyman 7' m Specman 8' c Agaba 10' c Con: Du Preez (2/5) 5', 8'; Geduld (2/2) 9', 10'	(Gold Coast 2018)

Robina Stadium, Gold Coast
Referee: Craig Evans (Wales)

14 April 2018
18:15

Scotland	41–0	Malaysia
Try: Graham 1' m Farndale (2) 3' c, 4' m Horne (2) 6' m, 10' c McFarland 7' c Fergusson 13' m Con: Jackson (1/4) 3'; Horne (2/2) 7', 10'; Fergusson (0/1)	(Gold Coast 2018)

Robina Stadium, Gold Coast
Referee: Richard Haughton (England)

14 April 2018
18:37

South Africa	52–0	Papua New Guinea
Try: Kok 1' c Specman (2) 1' m, 9' c Nel (2) 3' c, 5' c Sage 7' c Du Preez 11' m Davids 13' c Con: Du Preez (5/7) 1', 4', 5', 7', 9'; Afrika (1/1) 13'	(Gold Coast 2018)

Robina Stadium, Gold Coast
Referee: Richard Kelly (New Zealand)

14 April 2018
21:55

Papua New Guinea	31–5	Malaysia
Try: Kapana (2) 4' m, 6' c Guise 7' c Vali 8' c Tirang 12' m Con: Guise (1/3) 6'; Tokavai (2/2) 7', 8'	(Gold Coast 2018)	Try: Tarmizi 10' m Con: Affandi (0/1)

Robina Stadium, Gold Coast
Referee: Rasta Rasivhenge (South Africa)

14 April 2018
22:17

South Africa	26–5	Scotland
Try: Specman 4' c Nel 8' c Afrika 9' m Geduld 12' c Con: Geduld (3/4) 5', 8', 12'	(Gold Coast 2018)	Try: Farndale 14' m Con: Fergusson (0/1); Cards: Jackson (yellow card) 7' to 9'

Robina Stadium, Gold Coast
Referee: Damon Murphy (Australia)

=== Pool B ===
Pos	Team	Pld	W	D	L	PF	PA	PD	Pts	Qualification
1	England	3	3	0	0	97	22	+75	9	Semi-finals
2	Australia	3	2	0	1	73	38	+35	7	Classification semi-finals
3	Samoa	3	1	0	2	43	64	−21	5	
4	Jamaica	3	0	0	3	17	106	−89	3	

Source: GC2018
Rules for classification: 1) Points; 2) Head-to-head result; 3) Point difference; 4) Points scored.

14 April 2018
9:31

Australia	24–7	Samoa
Try: Anderson (2) 3' c, 5' m Longbottom 6' m Connor 9' c Con: Lucas (1/2) 3'; Porch (1/2) 9'	(Gold Coast 2018)	Try: Fomai 1' c Con: Mealoi (1/1) 1'

Robina Stadium, Gold Coast
Referee: Sam Grove-White (Scotland)

14 April 2018
9:53

England	38–5	Jamaica
Try: Mitchell (2) 1' m, 6' c Norton (2) 4' c, 12' m Glover 5' c Lindsay-Hague 8' c Con: Mitchell (3/4) 4', 5', 6'; Bibby (1/2) 8'	(Gold Goast 2018)	Try: Smith 10' m Con: Roy-Smith (0/1); Cards: Adamson (yellow card) 1' to 3'

Robina Stadium, Gold Coast
Referee: Jordan Way (Australia)

14 April 2018
13:11

Australia	32–5	Jamaica
Try: O'Donnell 1' m Longbottom (3) 2' m, 5' m, 14' m Porch 4' m Myers 11' c Con: Porch (0/4); Quinn (1/2) 11'; Cards: Killingworth (yellow card) 13'	(Gold Coast 2018)	Try: Bush 7' m Con: Stoppani (0/1); Cards: Beckett (yellow card) 11' to 13'

Robina Stadium, Gold Coast
Referee: Craig Evans (Wales)

14 April 2018
13:33

England	33–0	Samoa
Try: Bibby (2) 2' m, 5' c Mitchell 3' c Glover 7' c Lindsay-Hague 10' c Con: Mitchell (4/5) 4', 5', 7', 11'	(Gold Coast 2018)

Robina Stadium, Gold Coast
Referee: Rasta Rasivhenge (South Africa)

14 April 2018
19:43

Samoa	36–7	Jamaica
Try: Tupou 1' c Alofipo 3' c Afamasaga (2) 7' m, 8' c Paulo 11' m Motuga 12' m Con: Tupou (2/3) 1', 8'; Alosio Logotuli (1/2) 3'; Paulo (0/1)	(Gold Coast 2018)	Try: Richards 10' c Con: Adamson (1/1) 11'

Robina Stadium, Gold Coast
Referee: Jordan Way (Australia)

14 April 2018
20:05

England	26–17	Australia
Try: Norton 3' m Davis (2) 7' c, 12' c McConnochie 8' c Con: Mitchell (2/3) 8', 12'; Bibby (1/1) 7'; Cards: Mitchell (yellow card) 4' to 6'	(Gold Coast 2018)	Try: Taylor 1' m Porch 5' c Connor 10' m Con: Lucas (1/2) 5'; Porch (0/1)

Robina Stadium, Gold Coast
Referee: Richard Kelly (New Zealand)

=== Pool C ===
Pos	Team	Pld	W	D	L	PF	PA	PD	Pts	Qualification
1	New Zealand	3	3	0	0	127	14	+113	9	Semi-finals
2	Kenya	3	2	0	1	80	50	+30	7	Classification semi-finals
3	Canada	3	1	0	2	64	59	+5	5	
4	Zambia	3	0	0	3	0	148	−148	3	

Source: GC2018
Rules for classification: 1) Points; 2) Head-to-head result; 3) Point difference; 4) Points scored.

14 April 2018
10:15

Canada	10–26	Kenya
Try: Hirayama 1' m Douglas 10' m Con: Hirayama (0/2)	(Gold Coast 2018)	Try: Injera 7' m Oluoch 8' c Oyoo 12' c Ambaka 13' c Con: Oliech (3/4) 8', 12', 13'; Cards: Ouma Achieng (yellow card) 5' to 7'

Robina Stadium, Gold Coast
Referee: Richard Kelly (New Zealand)

14 April 2018
10:37

New Zealand	54–0	Zambia
Try: Koroi 1' c Nanai-Seturo 4' c Molia 7' m Mikkelson 8' c Rokolisoa 8' c Baker 10' c Knewstubb 11' c Ware 14' c Con: Baker (2/3) 1', 8'; Koroi (1/1) 4'; Rokolisoa (2/2) 9', 10'; Knewstubb (2/2) 11', 14'	(Gold Coast 2018)

Robina Stadium, Gold Coast
Referee: Damon Murphy (Australia)

14 April 2018
13:55

Canada	47–0	Zambia
Try: Hirayama 1' m Fuailefau (3) 2' c, 8' c, 11' c Douglas 4' c Coe 6' c Hammond 7' c Con: Hirayama (6/7) 3', 4', 6', 7', 8', 12'	(Gold Coast 2018)	Cards: Sheleni (yellow card) 8' to 10'

Robina Stadium, Gold Coast
Referee: Jordan Way (Australia)

14 April 2018
14:17

New Zealand	40–7	Kenya
Try: Nanai-Seturo (2) 1' m, 6' c Molia 3' c Ware 8' c Curry 9' c Knewstubb 11' c Con: Koroi (2/3) 3', 6'; Baker (1/1) 8'; Knewstubb (2/2) 10', 11'	(Gold Coast 2018)	Try: Oliech 12' c Con: Oliech (1/1) 13'

Robina Stadium, Gold Coast
Referee: Sam Grove-White (Scotland)

14 April 2018
20:27

Kenya	47–0	Zambia
Try: Owira 2' m Oluoch (2) 3' c, 9' c Oyoo (2) 5' c, 11' c Odhiambo 7' c Injera 7' c Con: Agero (6/7) 3', 5', 7', 7', 9', 11'	(Gold Coast 2018)

Robina Stadium, Gold Coast
Referee: Tevita Rokovereni (Fiji)

14 April 2018
20:49

New Zealand	33–7	Canada
Try: Curry 1' m Ware (2) 3' c, 8' c Koroi 5' c Baker 11' c Con: Knewstubb (3/4) 3', 5', 8'; Baker (1/1) 11'	(Gold Coast 2018)	Try: Cejvanovic 13' c Con: Hirayama (1/1) 14'; Cards: Jones (yellow card) 2' to 5'

Robina Stadium, Gold Coast
Referee: Craig Evans (Wales)

=== Pool D ===
Pos	Team	Pld	W	D	L	PF	PA	PD	Pts	Qualification
1	Fiji	3	3	0	0	138	22	+116	9	Semi-finals
2	Wales	3	2	0	1	90	38	+52	7	Classification semi-finals
3	Uganda	3	1	0	2	38	95	−57	5	
4	Sri Lanka	3	0	0	3	27	138	−111	3	

Source: GC2018
Rules for classification: 1) Points; 2) Head-to-head result; 3) Point difference; 4) Points scored.

14 April 2018
10:59

Wales	31–5	Uganda
Try: Jenkins 1' m Morgan 3' m Williams 8' c Treharne 9' c Amos 14' c Con: O'Brien (1/3) 9'; Davies (2/2) 10', 14'	(Gold Coast 2018)	Try: Odongo 11' m Con: Wokorach (0/1)

Robina Stadium, Gold Coast
Referee: Richard Haughton (England)

14 April 2018
11:21

Fiji	63–5	Sri Lanka
Try: Naduva (2) 1' c, 10' c Mocenacagi (3) 4' c, 6' c, 8' c Kunatani 7' c Dranisinukula 11' c Nasilasila (2) 13' c, 14' c Con: Ravouvou (4/4) 2', 4', 6', 7'; Nasilasila (5/5) 8', 10', 12', 13', 14'	(Gold Coast 2018)	Try: Wijekoon 1' m Con: Ratwatte (0/1)

Robina Stadium, Gold Coast
Referee: Rasta Rasivhenge (South Africa)

14 April 2018
17:31

Wales	42–12	Sri Lanka
Try: Roach (2) 3' c, 12' c Thomas 4' c Williams 6' c Jenkins 7' c Davies 13' c Con: Davies (6/6) 3', 4', 6', 7', 12', 14'	(Gold Coast 2018)	Try: Wijekoon 1' c Sooriyabandara 9' m Con: Ratwatte (1/2) 1'

Robina Stadium, Gold Coast
Referee: Tevita Rokovereni (Fiji)

14 April 2018
17:53

Fiji	54–0	Uganda
Try: Tuwai 1' c Sau 2' c Mocenacagi 4' c Ravouvou 6' m Nasilasila 10' c Nasoko 12' c Vakurinabili 13' c Dranisinukula 14' c Con: Ravouvou (3/4) 1', 2', 4'; Nasilasila (3/3) 10', 14', 14'; Naduva (1/1) 12'	(Gold Coast 2018)

Robina Stadium, Gold Coast
Referee: Damon Murphy (Australia)

14 April 2018
21:11

Uganda	33–10	Sri Lanka
Try: Kisiga 1' m Wokorach 4' c Odongo 8' c Kasito 9' c Ogena 11' c Con: Wokorach (4/5) 4', 8', 10', 11'	(Gold Coast 2018)	Try: Wijekoon (2) 1' m, 7' m Con: Ratwatte (0/2)

Robina Stadium, Gold Coast
Referee: Richard Haughton (England)

14 April 2018
21:33

Fiji	21–17	Wales
	(Gold Coast 2018)

Robina Stadium, Gold Coast
Referee: Sam Grove-White (Scotland)

== Knockout stage ==
=== Lower classification round ===
Classification Semi-finals
15 April 2018 – Robina Stadium
Australia	33
Kenya	5
15 April 2018 – Robina Stadium
Scotland	19
Wales	12

Match for 5th Place
15 April 2018 – Robina Stadium
Australia	26
Scotland	0
Match for 7th Place
15 April 2018 – Robina Stadium
Kenya	24
Wales	28

Matches

Classification semi-finals

15 April 2018
10:15

Australia	33–5	Kenya
Try: O'Donnell (2) 4' c, 13' c Longbottom 7' m Myers 8' c Porch 10' c Con: Porch (4/5) 4', 8', 11', 14'	(Gold Coast 2018)	Try: Odhiambo 1' m Con: Agero (0/1)

Robina Stadium, Gold Coast
Referee: Tevita Rokovereni (Fiji)

15 April 2018
10:37

Scotland	19–12	Wales
Try: Horne (2) 3' c, 6' c Farndale 11' m Con: Horne (2/3) 4', 6'	(Gold Coast 2018)	Try: Morgan (2) 2' m, 8' c Con: Davies (1/2) 8'

Robina Stadium, Gold Coast
Referee: Jordan Way (Australia)

Match for 7th Place

15 April 2018
13:11

Kenya	24–28	Wales
Try: Ambaka (2) 1' c, 9' m Odhiambo (2) 7' c, 14'; Con: Agero (2/3) 2', 7'	(Gold Coast 2018)	Try: Williams (2) 1' c, 4' c Morgan 10' c Treharne 12' c Con: Davies (2/2) 1', 4'; O'Brien (2/2) 10', 12'

Robina Stadium, Gold Coast
Referee: Richard Haughton (England)

Match for 5th Place

15 April 2018
13:33

Australia	26–0	Scotland
Try: Parahi (2) 1' c, 4' c Anderson 10' c Killingworth 12' m Con: Porch (3/3) 2', 4', 11'; O'Donnell (0/1)	(Gold Coast 2018)	Cards: McFarland (yellow card) 4' to 6'

Robina Stadium, Gold Coast
Referee: Craig Evans (Wales)

=== Medal round ===
Semi-finals
15 April 2018 – Robina Stadium
England	12
New Zealand	17
15 April 2018 – Robina Stadium
South Africa	19
Fiji	24 (a.e.t.)

Gold medal match
15 April 2018 – Robina Stadium
New Zealand	14
Fiji	0
Bronze medal match
15 April 2018 – Robina Stadium
England	21
South Africa	14

Matches

Semi-finals

15 April 2018
11:43

England	12–17	New Zealand
Try: Bibby 1' c Davis 6' m Con: Mitchell (1/2) 1'	(Gold Coast 2018)	Try: Ware (2) 3' m, 9' m Nanai-Seturo 7' c Con: Koroi (1/2) 7'; Knewstubb (0/1)

Robina Stadium, Gold Coast
Referee: Rasta Rasivhenge (South Africa)

15 April 2018
12:05

South Africa	19–24 {(a.e.t.)	Fiji
Try: Specman (2) 9' c, 11' m Sage 13' c Con: Geduld (1/1) 9'; Afrika (1/2) 13'	(Gold Coast 2018)	Try: Sau 1' c Tuwai 4' m Mocenacagi 8' c Nasilasila 15'; Con: Nasilasila (2/3) 1', 8'

Robina Stadium, Gold Coast
Referee: Richard Kelly (New Zealand)

Bronze medal match

15 April 2018
14:17

England	21–14	South Africa
Try: Burgess (2) 8' c, 11' c Mitchell 12' c Con: Mitchell (3/3) 8', 11', 12	(Gold Coast 2018)	Try: Du Preez 1' c Nel 6' c Con: Du Preez (2/2) 1', 6'

Robina Stadium, Gold Coast
Referee: Craig Evans (Wales)

Gold medal match

15 April 2018
15:04

New Zealand	14–0	Fiji
Try: Nanai-Seturo 1' c Ware 3' c Con: Koroi (2/2) 1', 3 Pen: Knewstubb (0/1)	(Gold Goast 2018)	Cards: Mocenacagi (yellow card) 5' to 7'

Robina Stadium, Gold Coast
Referee: Damon Murphy (Australia)

== Rankings ==
The retrospective rankings of the tournament are tallied below.

R	Pl	Team	Pld	W	D	L	PF	PA	PD	Pts	Result
1	C	New Zealand	5	5	0	0	158	26	+132	15	Champion
2	D	Fiji	5	4	0	1	162	55	+107	13	Runners-up
3	B	England	5	4	0	1	130	53	+77	13	Third place
4	A	South Africa	5	3	0	2	154	50	+104	11	Fourth place
5	B	Australia	5	4	0	1	132	43	+89	13	Classification round
6	A	Scotland	5	3	0	2	92	64	+28	11	Classification round
7	D	Wales	5	3	0	2	130	81	+49	11	Classification round
8	C	Kenya	5	2	0	3	109	111	−2	9	Classification round
9	C	Canada	3	1	0	2	64	59	+5	5	Eliminated in the pool stage
10	B	Samoa	3	1	0	2	43	64	−21	5	Eliminated in the pool stage
11	A	Papua New Guinea	3	1	0	2	31	84	−53	5	Eliminated in the pool stage
12	D	Uganda	3	1	0	2	38	95	−57	5	Eliminated in the pool stage
13	B	Jamaica	3	0	0	3	17	106	−89	3	Eliminated in the pool stage
14	A	Malaysia	3	0	0	3	5	115	−110	3	Eliminated in the pool stage
15	D	Sri Lanka	3	0	0	3	27	138	−111	3	Eliminated in the pool stage
16	C	Zambia	3	0	0	3	0	148	−148	3	Eliminated in the pool stage
