= 2019 Sydney Sevens =

- Sevens World Series XX
- Host nation: Australia
- Date: 2–3 February 2019

Cup
- Champion: New Zealand
- Runner-up: United States
- Third: England

Challenge Trophy
- Winner: Argentina

Tournament details
- Matches played: 45
- Tries scored: 268 (average 5.96 per match)
- Most points: Katsuyuki Sakai (47)
- Most tries: Joe Perez (6); Siviwe Soyizwapi (6)

The 2019 Sydney Sevens was the fourth tournament within the 2018–19 World Rugby Sevens Series and the seventeenth edition of the Australian Sevens. It was held over the weekend of 2–3 February 2019 at Spotless Stadium in Sydney, with former venue Allianz Stadium closed for rebuilding. It was run alongside the women's tournament.

== Format ==
The teams are drawn into four pools of four teams each. Each team plays every other team in their pool once. The top two teams from each pool advance to the Cup bracket where teams compete for the Gold, Silver, and Bronze Medals. The bottom two teams from each group go to the Challenge Trophy bracket.

== Teams ==
Fifteen core teams played in the tournament along with one invitational team, the highest-placing non-core team of the 2018 Oceania Sevens Championship, Tonga:

- Argentina
- Australia
- Canada
- England
- Fiji
- France
- Japan
- Kenya
- New Zealand
- Samoa
- Scotland
- South Africa
- Tonga
- Spain
- United States
- Wales

== Pool stage ==
All times in Australian Eastern Daylight Time (UTC+11:00)

=== Pool A ===
Team	Pld	W	D	L	PF	PA	PD	Pts
Fiji	3	3	0	0	65	24	+41	9
England	3	2	0	1	67	26	+41	7
Japan	3	1	0	2	26	82	–56	5
Samoa	3	0	0	3	41	67	–26	3

2 February 2019
11:12

Samoa	12–24	England
Try: Motuga 2'm Perez 13'c Con: Tusitala (1/1) 13'; Tupou (0/1)		Try: de Carpentier 1'm Muir 4'c Burgess 10'c Bowen 12'm Con: Bibby (2/3) 4', 11'; Mitchell (0/1)

Spotless Stadium, Sydney
Referee: Damon Murphy (Australia)

2 February 2019
11:34

Fiji	29–5	Japan
Try: Nacuqu 1'm Nasoko 3'm Vakurunabili (2) 10'c, 14'c Naduva 12'm Con: Veilawa (2/3) 11', 14'; Nacuqu (0/2)		Try: Soejima 9'm Con: Sakai (0/1)

Spotless Stadium, Sydney
Referee: Jérémy Rozier (France)

2 February 2019
16:40

Samoa	17–21	Japan
Try: Vaili 2'c Perez 9'm Afamasaga 12'm Con: Tusitala (1/1) 2'; Tupou (0/1); Alosio (0/1)		Try: Sakai 4'c Soejima 7'c Ozawa 11'c Con: Sakai (2/2) 4', 8'; Hashino 11'

Spotless Stadium, Sydney
Referee: Matt Rodden (Hong Kong)

2 February 2019
17:02

Fiji	14–7	England
Try: Tuimaba 5'c Tuwai 7'c Con: Botitu (2/2) 6', 7'		Try: Norton 8'c Con: Bibby (1/1) 8'

Spotless Stadium, Sydney
Referee: Craig Evans (Wales)

2 February 2019
20:45

England	36–0	Japan
Try: Norton (2) 1'm, 3'c Bibby 7'm Bowen 8'c Olowofela (2) 10'm, 12'c Con: Bibby (3/6) 3', 8', 13'

Spotless Stadium, Sydney
Referee: Jérémy Rozier (France)

2 February 2019
21:07

Fiji	22–12	Samoa
Try: Veilawa 3'm Naduva 6'c Botitu 9'm Nasoko 10'm Con: Veilawa (1/3) 6'; Botitu (0/1)		Try: Alosio 4'm Perez 7c Con: Alosio (1/1) 7'; Tupou (0/1)

Spotless Stadium, Sydney
Referee: Richard Kelly (New Zealand)

=== Pool B ===
Team	Pld	W	D	L	PF	PA	PD	Pts
United States	3	3	0	0	84	14	+70	9
France	3	2	0	1	57	36	+21	7
Canada	3	1	0	2	50	67	–17	5
Kenya	3	0	0	3	31	105	–74	3

2 February 2019
9:44

Canada	24–14	Kenya
Try: Davis (2) 1'c, 5'm Braid 7'm Berna 14'c Con: Hirayama (2/4)		Try: Mwale 2'c Olindi 12'c Con: Olindi (1/1) 2'; Taabu (1/1) 12'

Spotless Stadium, Sydney
Referee: Sam Grove-White (Scotland)

2 February 2019
10:06

United States	7–0	France
Try: Williams 10'c Con: Hughes (1/1) 10'

Spotless Stadium, Sydney
Referee: Craig Evans (Wales)

2 February 2019
15:12

Canada	12–17	France
Try: Fuailefau 6'm Kay 8'c Con: Hirayama (1/2) 8'		Try: Yobo 2'c Mazzoleni (2) 9'm, 13'm Con: Riva (1/3) 3'

Spotless Stadium, Sydney
Referee: Jordan Way (Australia)

2 February 2019
15:34

United States	41–0	Kenya
Try: Barrett 0'm Pinkelman 1'm Iosefo 3'm Hughes 7'c Isles 8'm Brown 10'c Williams 11'm Con: Hughes (1/5) 7'; Williams (2/2) 11', 12'

Spotless Stadium, Sydney
Referee: Richard Haughton (England)

2 February 2019
19:17

Kenya	17–40	France
Try: Wandera 2'm Onyala 5'c Ruga 14'm Con: Taabu (1/2) 6'; Olindi (0/1)		Try: Parez (4) 1'c, 7'c, 7'c, 10'c Riva 9'c Huyard 12'm Con: Riva (3/3) 1', 7', 8'; Mazzoleni (2/3) 10', 11'

Spotless Stadium, Sydney
Referee: Matt Rodden (Hong Kong)

2 February 2019
19:39

United States	36–14	Canada
Try: Isles (3) 3'm, 7'm, 12'c Williams (3) 5'c, 8'm, 13'c Con: Tomasin (1/2) 6'; Hughes (2/3) 13', 14'; Niua (0/1)		Try: Braid 10'c Kay 11'c Con: Hirayama (2/2) 10', 11'

Spotless Stadium, Sydney
Referee: James Doleman (New Zealand)

=== Pool C ===
Team	Pld	W	D	L	PF	PA	PD	Pts
New Zealand	3	3	0	0	110	14	+96	9
Spain	3	2	0	1	31	53	–22	7
Wales	3	1	0	2	45	60	–15	5
Scotland	3	0	0	3	19	78	–59	3

2 February 2019
9:00

Scotland	7–10	Spain
Try: Elms 4'c Con: Lowe (1/1) 5'		Try: Alonso 11'm Mateu 14'm Con: Hernández (0/2)

Spotless Stadium, Sydney
Referee: James Doleman (New Zealand)

2 February 2019
9:22

New Zealand	27–14	Wales
Try: Ravouvou 0'm Ng Shiu 5'm Baker 7'm Ware 12'm Molia 14'c Con: Knewstubb 14'		Try: Jenkins 3'c Con: Treharne

Spotless Stadium, Sydney
Referee: Richard Haughton (England)

2 February 2019
14:28

Scotland	12–26	Wales
Try: Pecqueur 0'c Coombes 7'm Con: Lowe (1/2) 1'		Try: Morgan-Williams 3'm Jenkins (2) 5'c, 12'; Blacker 10'c Con: Treharne (3/4) 5', 11', 13'

Spotless Stadium, Sydney
Referee: Damon Murphy (Australia)

2 February 2019
14:50

New Zealand	41–0	Spain
Try: Ware 0'm Dickson (2) 2'm, 4'm Nareki 7'c Ravouvou (2) 7'c, 13'm Baker 10'c Con: Knewstubb (2/5) 7', 7'; Koroi (1/2) 10'

Spotless Stadium, Sydney
Referee: Jérémy Rozier (France)

2 February 2019
18:33

Spain	21–5	Wales
Try: Pla (2) 5'c, 7'; Alonso 7'c Con: Hernández (2/2) 6', 7', 8'		Try: Treharne 13'm Con: Treharne (0/1)

Spotless Stadium, Sydney
Referee: Sam Grove-White (Scotland)

2 February 2019
18:55

New Zealand	42–0	Scotland
Try: Knewstubb (2) 1'c, 6'c Ware 4'c Gregory (2) 9'c, 11'c Nareki 14'; Con: Knewstubb (3/3) 2', 5', 6'; Koroi (3/3) 10', 12', 14'

Spotless Stadium, Sydney
Referee: Jordan Way (Australia)

=== Pool D ===
Team	Pld	W	D	L	PF	PA	PD	Pts
South Africa	3	2	0	1	91	44	+47	7
Australia	3	2	0	1	75	50	+25	7
Argentina	3	2	0	1	73	51	+22	7
Tonga	3	0	0	3	17	111	–94	3

2 February 2019
10:28

Australia	14–29	Argentina
Try: Kennewell 6'c Longbottom 12'c Con: Porch (1/1) 7'; Holland (1/1) 12'		Try: Carreras 1'm Cinti Luna 7'c Gonzalez 8'c Ethcart 11'c Con: Mare (1/2) 7'; Bazan Velez (1/1) 8'; Revol (1/1) 11'

Spotless Stadium, Sydney
Referee: Richard Kelly (New Zealand)

2 February 2019
10:50

South Africa	45–5	Tonga
Try: Kok (2) 3'c, 8'c Soyizwapi (2) 6'c, 7'm Gans (2) 10'c, 12'c Human 14'm Con: Du Preez (2/2) 3', 6'; S. Davids (1/2) 8'; Human (2/3) 10', 12'		Try: F. Inisi 1'm Con: Pakalani (0/1)

Spotless Stadium, Sydney
Referee: Matt Rodden (Hong Kong)

2 February 2019
15:56

Australia	32–0	Tonga
Try: Anderson 0'm, 7'm Holland 2'm Hutchison 4'm Parahi 7'c Holland 11'm Con: Porch (1/4) 7'; Holland (0/1); Coward (0/1)

Spotless Stadium, Sydney
Referee: James Doleman (New Zealand)

2 February 2019
16:18

South Africa	25–10	Argentina
Try: Soyizwapi (2) 7'm, 8'm S. Davids 10'm Geduld 13'm Gans 14'm Con: Du Preez (0/1); S. Davids (0/3); Human (0/1)		Try: Barbier 4'm Etchart 11'm Con: Mare (0/1); Revol (0/1)

Spotless Stadium, Sydney
Referee: Sam Grove-White (Scotland)

2 February 2019
20:01

Argentina	34–12	Tonga
Try: Bazan Velez 6'm Sabato (2) 7'c, 9'm Etchart 10'm Gonzalez 13'm Schulz 14'c Con: Bazan Velez (1/3) 8'; Revol (1/3) 14'		Try: Mausia 1'm F. Inisi 7'; Con: Mausia (1/2) 7'

Spotless Stadium, Sydney
Referee: Damon Murphy (Australia)

2 February 2019
20:23

South Africa	21–29	Australia
Try: Geduld (2) 6'c, 8'c Gans 10'c Con: Du Preez (1/1) 6'; S. Davids (2/2) 8', 11'		Try: Skelton 1'm Holland (2) 2'c, 3'm Coward 12'c Malouf 14'm Con: Porch (1/3) 2'; Coward (1/2) 13'

Spotless Stadium, Sydney
Referee: Craig Evans (Wales)

== Knockout stage ==
=== Thirteenth Place ===
Semi-finals
3 February 2019 – 14:04 – Spotless Stadium, Sydney
Tonga	20
Kenya	17
3 February 2019 – 14:26 – Spotless Stadium, Sydney
Samoa	26
Scotland	12

Final
3 February 2019 – 19:08 – Spotless Stadium, Sydney
Tonga	5
Samoa	25

Matches

Semifinals

3 February 2019
14:04

Tonga	20–17	Kenya
Try: Tapueluelu (2) 0'm, 6'm L. Inisi 7'm Maake 13'm Con: Maake (0/2); Tuha (0/2)		Try: Ojee 4'm Mwasawa 7'm Onyala 11'c Con: Wanjala (1/1) 11'; Taabu (0/2)

Spotless Stadium, Sydney
Referee: Richard Haughton (England)

3 February 2019
14:26

Samoa	26–12	Scotland
Try: Tupou 1'c Alofipo (2) 4'm, 14'c Paulo 8'c Con: Tusitala (2/3) 2', 9'; Tupou (1/1) 14'		Try: Pecqueur (2/2) 10'c, 11'm Con: Lowe (2/2) 10'

Spotless Stadium, Sydney
Referee: Jérémy Rozier (France)

Final

3 February 2019
19:08

Tonga	5–25	Samoa
Try: Inisi 4'm Con: Tuha (0/1)		Try: Perez (3) 2'm, 6'm, 7'm Tupou 9'm Alofipo 13'm Con: Tusitala (0/3); Tupou (0/1); Paulo (0/1)

Spotless Stadium, Sydney
Referee: Jérémy Rozier (France)

=== Challenge Trophy ===
Quarter-finals
3 February 2019 – 10:38 – Spotless Stadium, Sydney
Japan	31
Tonga	19
3 February 2019 – 11:00 – Spotless Stadium, Sydney
Wales	19
Kenya	14
3 February 2019 – 11:22 – Spotless Stadium, Sydney
Argentina	36
Samoa	12
3 February 2019 – 11:44 – Spotless Stadium, Sydney
Canada	35
Scotland	21

Semi-finals
3 February 2019 – 14:48 – Spotless Stadium, Sydney
Japan	19
Wales	17
3 February 2019 – 15:10 – Spotless Stadium, Sydney
Argentina	24
Canada	19

Final
3 February 2019 – 19:30 – Spotless Stadium, Sydney
Japan	7
Argentina	10

Matches

Quarterfinals

3 February 2019
10:38

Japan	31–19	Tonga
Try: Sakai (2) 1'c, 9'm Ozawa (2) 2'c, 4'c Noguchi 12'm Con: Sakai (3/5) 1', 3', 4'		Try: Sunia 6'c Paea 7'm Tapueluelu 14'c Con: Samita (1/2) 6'; L. Inisi (1/1) 14'

Spotless Stadium, Sydney
Referee: Jérémy Rozier (France)

3 February 2019
11:00

Wales	19–14	Kenya
Try: Jenkins 0'c Treharne 4'c Roach 11'm Con: Treharne (2/3) 1', 4'		Try: Onyala (2) 2'c, 6'c Con: Olindi (1/1) 2'; Onyala (1/1) 7'

Spotless Stadium, Sydney
Referee: Sam Grove-White (Scotland)

3 February 2019
11:22

Argentina	36–12	Samoa
Try: Carreras 2'm Schulz 5'm Cinti Luna 7'm Gonzalez 7'c Sábato 11'c Luna 12'c Con: Mare (3/4) 8', 12', 13'; Bazan Velez (0/2)		Try: Tupou (2) 4'm, 10'c Con: Tupou (1/1) 10'; Alosio

Spotless Stadium, Sydney
Referee: Craig Evans (Wales)

3 February 2019
11:44

Canada	35–21	Scotland
Try: Kaay (2) 0'c, 13'c Kay (2) 3'c, 4'c Mullins 7'c Con: Hirayama (4/4) 1', 3', 5', 7', 14'		Try: McFarland 8'c Nayacavou 9'c Riddell 11'c Con: Lowe (2/2) 8', 9'; Riddell (1/1) 11'

Spotless Stadium, Sydney
Referee: Matt Rodden (Hong Kong)

Semifinals

3 February 2019
14:48

Japan	19–17	Wales
Try: Motomura (2) 0'm, 5'c Noguchi 10'c Con: Sakai (2/3) 5', 11'		Try: Roach 2'm Jenkins 9'c Goodchild 14'm Con: Treharne (1/3) 9'

Spotless Stadium, Sydney
Referee: Matt Rodden (Hong Kong)

3 February 2019
15:10

Argentina	24–19	Canada
Try: Luna (2) 3'c, 11'm Bazan Velez 6'm Schulz 8'm Con: Bazan Velez (2/3) 3', 6'; Luna (0/1)		Try: Zaruba 7'm Thiel 7'c Braid 12'c Con: Hirayama (2/3) 8', 13'

Spotless Stadium, Sydney
Referee: Sam Grove-White (Scotland)

Final

3 February 2019
19:30

Japan	7–10	Argentina
Try: Sakai 4'c Con: Sakai (1/1) 5'		Try: Gonzalez 2'm Luna 10'm Con: Bazan Velez (0/2)

Spotless Stadium, Sydney
Referee: James Doleman (New Zealand)

=== 5th Place ===
Semi-finals
3 February 2019 – 15:32 – Spotless Stadium, Sydney
Australia	17
France	14
3 February 2019 – 15:54 – Spotless Stadium, Sydney
South Africa	33
Spain	0

Final
3 February 2019 – 20:07 – Spotless Stadium, Sydney
Australia	10
South Africa	12

Matches

Semifinals

3 February 2019
15:32

Australia	17–14	France
Try: Hutchison 3'm Skelton (2) 11'c, 13'm Con: Holland (1/1) 12'; Porch (0/2)		Try: Mignot 6'c Boudehent 9'c Con: Parez (1/1) 6'; Riva (1/1) 10'

Spotless Stadium, Sydney
Referee: Richard Kelly (New Zealand)

3 February 2019
15:54

South Africa	33–0	Spain
Try: S. Davids (2) 0'c, 6'c Soyizwapi (2) 10'm, 12'c Human 14'c Con: S. Davids (2/3) 1', 7'; Human (2/2) 12', 14'

Spotless Stadium, Sydney
Referee: Craig Evans (Wales)

Final

3 February 2019
20:07

Australia	10–12	South Africa
Try: Porch 6'm Malouf 10'; Con: Porch (0/2)		Try: S. Davids 1'c Brown 13'm Con: Geduld (1/1) 1'; Du Preez (0/1)

Spotless Stadium, Sydney
Referee: Richard Haughton (England)

=== Cup ===
Quarter-finals
3 February 2019 – 12:16 – Spotless Stadium, Sydney
Fiji	22
Australia	17
3 February 2019 – 12:38 – Spotless Stadium, Sydney
New Zealand	28
France	5
3 February 2019 – 13:00 – Spotless Stadium, Sydney
South Africa	5
England	26
3 February 2019 – 13:22 – Spotless Stadium, Sydney
United States	38
Spain	10

Semi-finals
3 February 2019 – 16:16 – Spotless Stadium, Sydney
Fiji	14
New Zealand	36
3 February 2019 – 16:38 – Spotless Stadium, Sydney
England	7
United States	14

Final
3 February 2019 – 20:56 – Spotless Stadium, Sydney
New Zealand	21
United States	5
Third place
3 February 2019 – 20:29 – Spotless Stadium, Sydney
Fiji	17
England	19

Matches

Quarterfinals

3 February 2019
12:16

Fiji	22–17	Australia
Try: Veilawa 4'm Kunavula 7'; Naduva (1/1) 11'c, 13'; Con: Veilawa (1/2) 12'; Botitu (0/1)		Try: Longbottom 3'm Skelton 9'm Parahi 10'; Con: Holland (1/2) 11'; Porch (0/1)

Spotless Stadium, Sydney
Referee: James Doleman (New Zealand)

3 February 2019
12:38

New Zealand	28–5	France
Try: Jona Nareki 4'c Ware 6'c Dickson 9'c Ng Shiu 14'c Con: Knewstubb (2/2) 5', 6'; Koroi (2/2) 9', 14'		Try: Mazzoleni 12'm Con: Mazzoleni (0/1)

Spotless Stadium, Sydney
Referee: Damon Murphy (Australia)

3 February 2019
13:00

South Africa	5–26	England
Try: Z. Davids 7'm Con: S. Davids (0/1)		Try: Kerr 2'; Mitchell 3'c Burgess 12'c Bowen 13'; Con: Bibby (3/4) 2', 4', 12'

Spotless Stadium, Sydney
Referee: Richard Kelly (New Zealand)

3 February 2019
13:22

United States	38–10	Spain
Try: Hughes (2) 4'c, 7'c Tomasin (2) 5'c, 9'; Isles 8'c Thompson 13'm Con: Hughes (4/6) 4', 6', 7', 8'		Try: Carrión 2'm Alonso 14'm Con: Hernández (0/1); Fontes (0/1)

Spotless Stadium, Sydney
Referee: Jordan Way (Australia)

Semifinals

3 February 2019
16:16

Fiji	14–36	New Zealand
Try: Tuwai 4'c Naduva 13'c Con: Nucuqu (1/1) 4'; Veilawa (1/1) 13'		Try: Ng Shiu 0'c Gregory 2'c Baker (2) 6'm, 10'c Koroi 8'm, 13'm Con: Koroi (2/5) 1', 2'; Baker (1/1) 11'

Spotless Stadium, Sydney
Referee: Damon Murphy (Australia)

3 February 2019
16:38

England	7–14	United States
Try: Norton 1'c Con: Bibby (1/1) 1'		Try: Tomasin 3'c Pinkelman 6'c Con: Hughes (2/2) 4', 7'

Spotless Stadium, Sydney
Referee: Jordan Way (Australia)

Third Place

3 February 2019
20:29

Fiji	17–19	England
Try: Cakaubalavu (2) 9'm, 11'm, 14'c Con: Veilawa (1/2) 14'; Botitu (0/1)		Try: Bowen (2) 1'm, 3'; Muir 7'c Con: Mitchell (1/2) 4', 8'

Spotless Stadium, Sydney
Referee: Richard Kelly (New Zealand)

Final

3 February 2019
20:56

New Zealand	21–5	United States
Try: Ware 1'c Dickson 6'c Ng Shiu 8'c Con: Koroi (2/2) 2', 7', 8'		Try: Thompson 10'm Con: Hughes (0/1)

Spotless Stadium, Sydney
Referee: Jordan Way (Australia)

== Tournament placings ==
Place	Team	Points
1st place, gold medalist(s)	New Zealand	22
2nd place, silver medalist(s)	United States	19
3rd place, bronze medalist(s)	England	17
4	Fiji	15
5	South Africa	13
6	Australia	12
7	France	10
7	Spain	10

Place	Team	Points
9	Argentina	8
10	Japan	7
11	Canada	5
11	Wales	5
13	Samoa	3
14	Tonga	2
15	Kenya	1
15	Scotland	1

Source: World Rugby

== Players ==
=== Scoring leaders ===
Tries scored
Rank	Player	Tries
1	Joe Perez	6
1	Siviwe Soyizwapi	6
3	Alasio Naduva	5
3	Carlin Isles	5
3	Mateo Carreras	5

Points scored
Rank	Player	Points
1	Katsuyuki Sakai	47
2	Madison Hughes	35
3	Vilimoni Koroi	32
3	Joe Perez	30
3	Selvyn Davids	30

Source: World Rugby

=== Dream Team ===
The following seven players were selected to the tournament Dream Team at the conclusion of the tournament:

Forwards	Backs
(Fiji) Mesulame Kunavula (New Zealand) Sam Dickson (United States) Stephen Tomasin	(Fiji) Alasio Naduva (United States) Madison Hughes (New Zealand) Kurt Baker (England) Dan Norton

== See also ==
- World Rugby Sevens Series
- 2018–19 World Rugby Sevens Series
- 2019 Sydney Women's Sevens

World Sevens Series XX
Preceded by 2019 New Zealand Sevens	2019 Sydney Sevens	Succeeded by 2019 USA Sevens
Australian Sevens
Preceded by 2018 Sydney Sevens	2019 Sydney Sevens	Succeeded by 2020 Sydney Sevens
