= Bailey Simonsson =

Maori international dual code rugby footballer

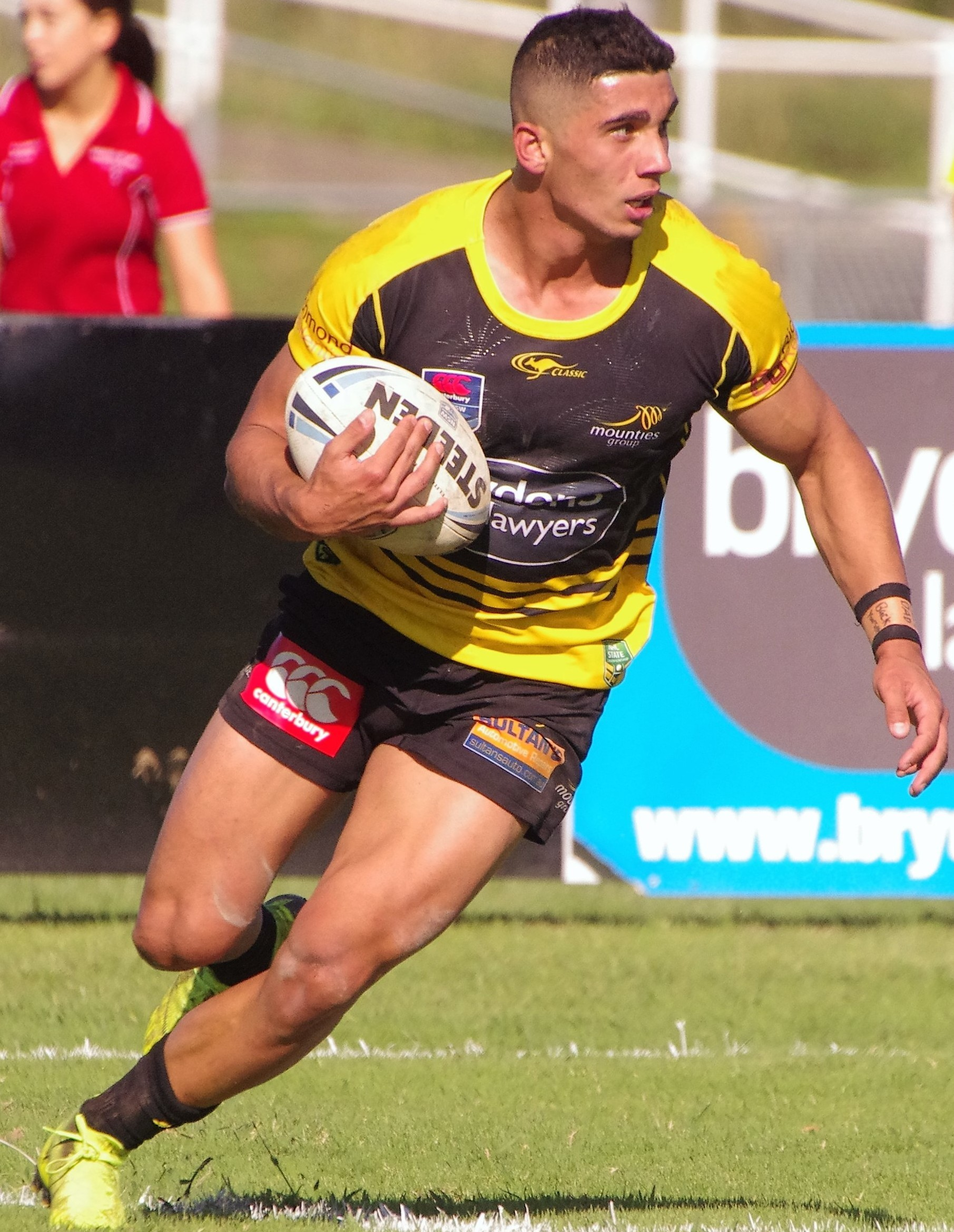

Personal information
- Full name: Bailey George Simonsson
- Born: 18 February 1998 (age 28) Mona Vale, New South Wales, Australia
- Height: 185 cm (6 ft 1 in)
- Weight: 100 kg (15 st 10 lb)

Playing information

Rugby league
- Position: Wing, Centre
Club
Years	Team	Pld	T	G	FG	P
2019–21	Canberra Raiders	45	16	0	0	64
2022–	Parramatta Eels	61	20	0	0	80
	Total	106	36	0	0	144
Representative
Years	Team	Pld	T	G	FG	P
2021	Māori All Stars	1	0	0	0	0

Rugby union
Representative
Years	Team	Pld	T	G	FG	P
2018	All Blacks 7s
- Source: As of 6 April 2026

Bailey George Simonsson (born 18 February 1998) is a New Zealand professional rugby league footballer who plays as a winger or centre for the Parramatta Eels in the National Rugby League and New Zealand Māori at international level.

He previously played for the Canberra Raiders in the NRL.

== Background ==
Simonsson was born in Mona Vale, New South Wales, Australia. He is of Māori heritage through his father and European heritage through his mother. He attended Marist College Canberra, Knox Grammar School and Newington College in Sydney as a school student.

== Playing career ==
=== Early career ===
Simonsson played for the Canberra Raiders in the Harold Matthews Cup (under 16s), later joining the Canterbury-Bankstown Bulldogs to play S. G. Ball Cup (under 18s) and NYC (under 20s) until 2017.

=== Switch to rugby union ===
In 2018, Simonsson represented the New Zealand rugby 7s team at the tournaments in Hong Kong, London, and Paris.

=== Return to rugby league ===
Simonsson signed with the Canberra Raiders in December 2018. He made his first grade debut in Round 1 of the 2019 NRL season against the Gold Coast Titans scoring a try in a 21-0 victory. In Round 20 against the New Zealand Warriors, Simonsson scored 2 tries as Canberra won the match 46-12 at Mount Smart Stadium.

In the 2019 qualifying final, Simonsson scored a try as Canberra staged a shock 12-10 victory over minor premiers Melbourne at AAMI Park to secure a home preliminary final. Simonsson played from the bench in the 2019 NRL Grand Final against the Sydney Roosters in which Canberra were defeated 14-8 at ANZ Stadium. It was Canberra's first grand final appearance in 25 years.

Simonsson suffered a season-ending shoulder injury against Melbourne at GIO Stadium in round 9 of the 2020 NRL season after which he underwent surgery and spent the rest of the season in rehabilitation.

In round 22 of the 2021 NRL season, he scored a hat-trick in Canberra's 26-16 loss against Melbourne. On 10 December 2021, Simonsson signed a three-year deal to join Parramatta starting in the 2022 NRL season. In round 1 of the 2022 NRL season, he made his club debut for Parramatta in their 32-28 victory over the Gold Coast. In round 12 of the 2022 NRL season, he scored two tries for Parramatta in their 28-20 victory over his former side Canberra. Simonsson played for Parramatta in their 28-12 Grand Final loss to Penrith. In the second half of the match, Simonsson made a break down the left hand side of the field but was tackled into touch by Dylan Edwards. Simonsson injured his shoulder during the tackle and was taken from the field with his arm being held in a sling.

In round 5 of the 2023 NRL season, Simonsson was sent to the sin bin for a late tackle on Sydney Roosters player James Tedesco. Simonsson later scored a try in Parramatta's 28-20 loss. In round 12 of the 2023 NRL season, Simonsson scored two tries for Parramatta in their 36-16 upset victory over South Sydney. Simonsson played a total of 20 matches for Parramatta in the 2023 NRL season as the club finished 10th and missed the finals.

On 3 June 2024, it was announced that Simonsson would miss the rest of the 2024 NRL season with an ACL injury. Simonsson had been one of the standout players in a struggling Parramatta side prior to the injury. On 16 August 2024, Simonsson re-signed with Parramatta until the end of 2027.

=== 2025 ===
On 13 May 2025, it was announced that Simonsson would miss between 8-10 weeks with a stress fracture in his foot which he sustained during the clubs narrow loss to the Dolphins in round 10 of the 2025 NRL season.In round 19 of the 2025 NRL season, Simonsson played his 100th first grade game in Parramatta's 32-10 loss against Penrith. On 7 August 2025, it was reported that Simonsson had requested an immediate release from his contract with Parramatta after reportedly being unhappy with new head coach Jason Ryles. On 13 August 2025, it was reported that Simonsson had been given permission to negotiate with rival clubs ahead of the 2026 NRL season.

=== 2026 ===
During round 5, Simonsson was taken off the field after suffering an ankle dislocation when he attempted to catch a ball during Parramatta's golden point extra-time loss against the Wests Tigers. He was later ruled out for an indefinite period.

== Statistics ==
Year	Team	Games	Tries	Pts
2019	Canberra Raiders	21	8	32
2020	Canberra Raiders	7	2	8
2021	Canberra Raiders	17	6	24
2022	Parramatta Eels	20	3	12
2023	Parramatta Eels	20	9	36
2024	Parramatta Eels	10	4	16
2025	Parramatta Eels	6	2	8
2026	Parramatta Eels	5	2	8
	Totals	106	36	144
