= Jean-Pascal =

Jean-Pascal is a French masculine given name. Notable people with the name include:

- Jean-Pascal Beintus (born 1966), French composer
- Jean-Pascal Chaigne (born 1977), French composer of mainly chamber works
- Jean-Pascal Delamuraz (1936–1998), Swiss politician
- Jean-Pascal Fontaine (born 1989), French football midfielder
- Jean-Pascal Hohm (born 1997), German politician
- Jean-Pascal Lacoste (born 1978), French singer, actor and TV host
- Jean-Pascal Mignot (born 1981), French football player
- Jean-Pascal van Ypersele (born 1957), Belgian Professor of Climatology and Environmental Sciences

== See also ==
- Jean Pascal (born 1982), Haitian-Canadian boxer
