= Mark Roche =

Irish rugby union player

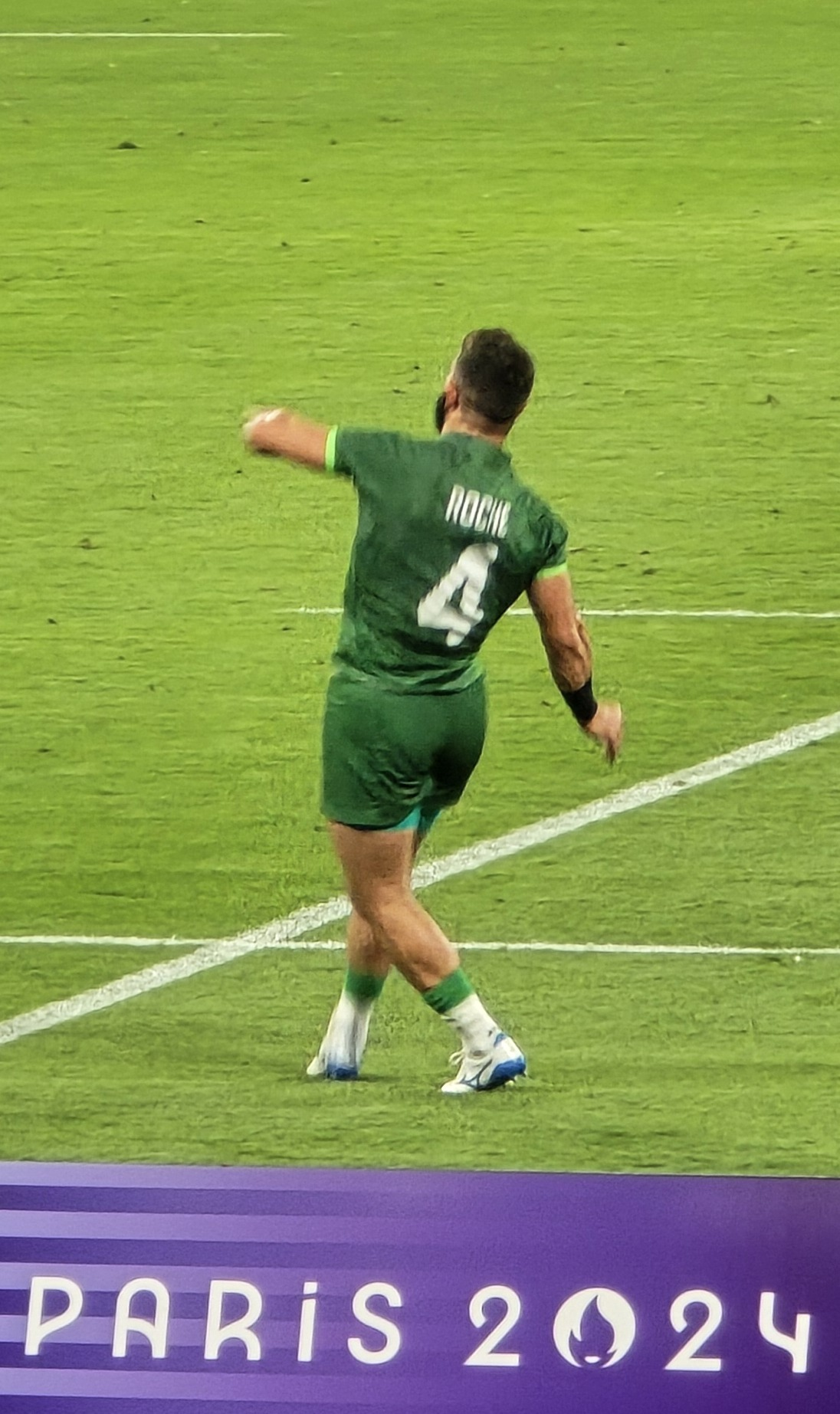
- Roche attempts a conversion during the Ireland's quarter-final matchup against Fiji at the 2024 Summer Olympics
- Born: 25 January 1993 (age 33)
- Height: 173 cm (5 ft 8 in)
- Weight: 89 kg (196 lb)
- Occupation: Professional rugby player

Rugby union career
- Position: Scrum-half (7s)
Senior career
Years	Team	Apps	(Points)
2016–	Lansdowne		
International career
Years	Team	Apps	(Points)
2014	Ireland under-20		
National sevens team
Years	Team		Comps
2016–	Ireland 7s		
Medal record
Men's rugby sevens
Representing Ireland
European Games
Gold medal – first place	2023 Kraków–Małopolska	Team competition

Mark Roche (born 25 January 1993) is an Irish rugby union player. He plays for the Ireland national rugby sevens team as a scrum-half.

== Youth rugby and early career ==
In his youth, Roche played with Blackrock. He then went on to play for the Ireland under-20 national team in the 2013 IRB Junior World Championship. He was also part of the Lansdowne team that was crowned 2015 All-Ireland League Division 1A champions, scoring a try in the final against Clontarf.

== Ireland national sevens team ==
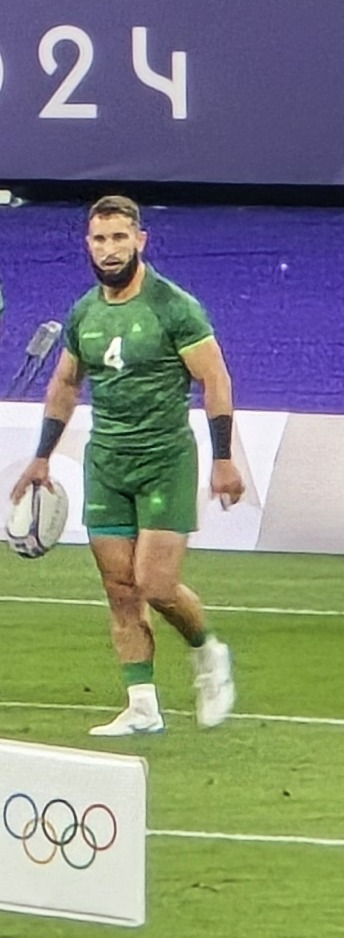
Mark Roche during Ireland's 2024 Summer Olympics quarter-final.

Roche has played as a scrum-half for the Ireland national rugby sevens team since 2015. Roche played for Ireland in the 2017 Rugby Europe Grand Prix, helping Ireland qualify for the 2018 Hong Kong qualifier and the 2018 Rugby World Cup Sevens.

Roche was part of the Ireland team that reached the semifinals of the 2018 Hong Kong Sevens qualifier for the 2018–19 World Rugby Sevens Series. He started at scrum-half for the Ireland team that finished third at the 2018 London Sevens; Roche was selected to the tournament Dream Team at the conclusion of the tournament. He competed for Ireland at the 2022 Rugby World Cup Sevens in Cape Town.

He represented Ireland at the 2024 Summer Olympics in Paris.
