= Jared Rosser =

Welsh rugby union footballer

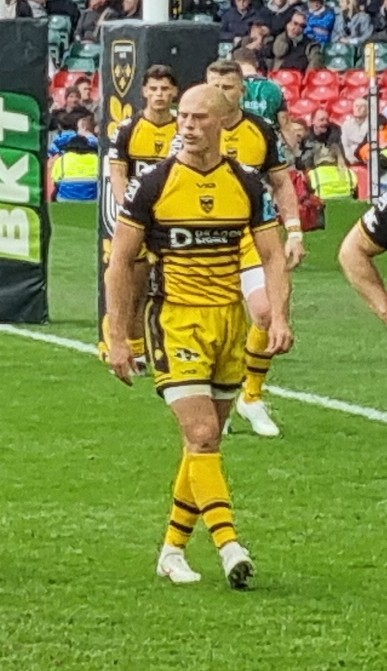
- Judgement Day 2025
- Born: Jared Rosser; 31 December 1997 (age 28) Abergavenny, Wales
- Height: 183 cm (6 ft 0 in)
- Weight: 97 kg (214 lb)
- School: Newport High School
- Notable relative: Ewan Rosser (brother)

Rugby union career
- Position(s): Wing; Fullback
- Current team: Dragons
Senior career
Years	Team	Apps	(Points)
2017–	Dragons	95	(150)
- Correct as of 7 January 2025

Jared Rosser (born 21 February 1997) is a Welsh rugby union player who plays for Dragons as a wing.

== Professional career ==
Rosser made his debut for the Dragons regional team in September 2017 against Leinster having previously played for Bedwas RFC and Ebbw Vale RFC. Rosser scored a hat-trick of tries against Zebre Parma on 14 April 2018.

He signed a contract with the Dragons on 29 April 2019.

Rosser signed an extension with the Dragons on 25 May 2022, followed by a further extension on 10 April 2023.

== Personal life ==
Rosser’s younger brother Ewan, is a professional rugby player, also playing for the Dragons as a wing.
