= Joe Perez (rugby union) =

Samoan rugby union player (born 1993)

- Born: 10 March 1993 (age 33)

Rugby union career
- Position: Back
International career
Years	Team	Apps	(Points)
2022–	Samoa	1	(0)
Medal record
Rugby sevens
Representing Samoa
Pacific Games
Silver medal – second place	2019 Apia	Men's tournament

Joe Perez (born 10 March 1993) is a Samoan international rugby union player.

== Rugby career ==
A backline player, Perez is a rugby sevens specialist at international level, with one of his best performances coming at the 2019 Sydney Sevens, where he won the Impact Player award. He made his Test debut for the Samoa XV in a win over Romania in 2022. At the end of 2022, Perez signed a pre-season training contract with Super Rugby outfit Moana Pasifika. He played professional rugby in 2023 with Romanian club CS Dinamo București.

== See also ==
- List of Samoa national rugby union players
