= Ramil Gaisin =

Russian rugby union player

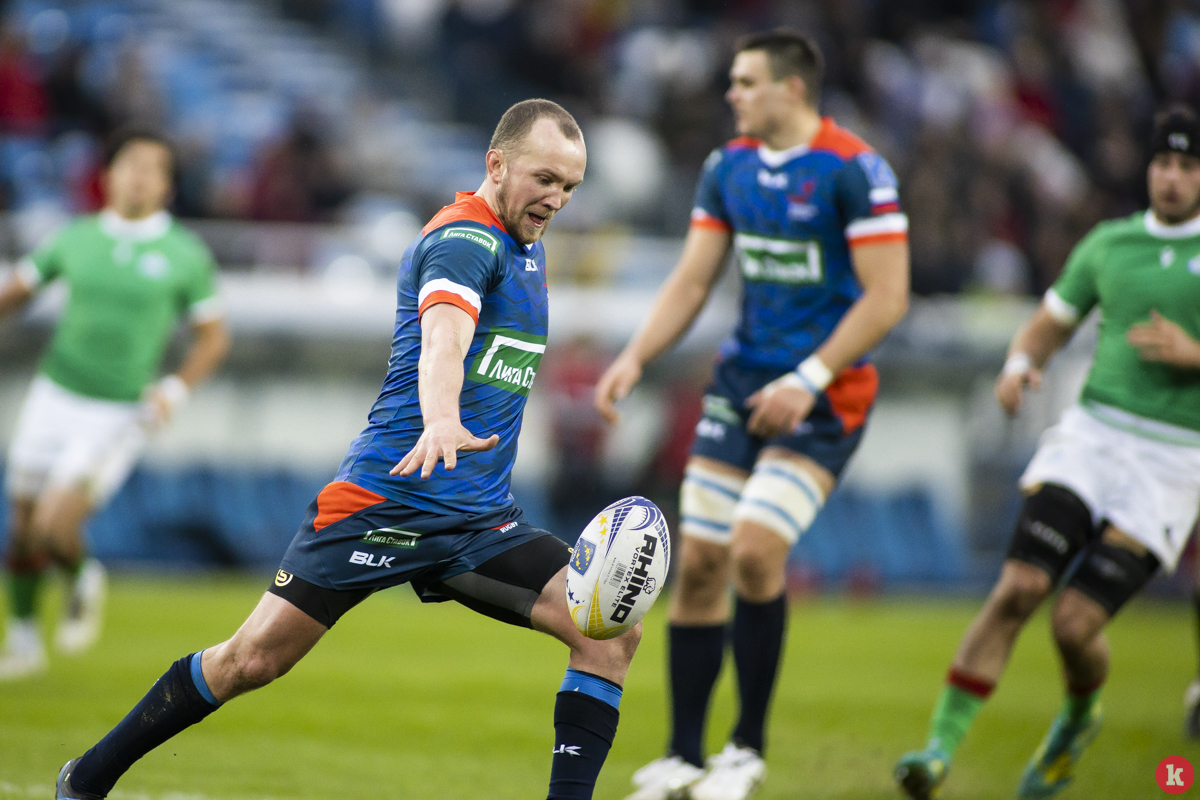
- Born: 26 July 1991 (age 35) Krasnoyarsk, Russia
- Height: 1.78 m (5 ft 10 in)
- Weight: 85 kg (187 lb)

Rugby union career
- Position: Fly half
- Current team: Enisey-STM
Youth career
- Enisey-STM
Senior career
Years	Team	Apps	(Points)
2010–	Enisey-STM	177	(1109)
- Correct as of 15 July 2023
International career
Years	Team	Apps	(Points)
2012–	Russia	63	(252)
- Correct as of 19 April 2023

Ramil Gaisin (born 26 July 1991) is a Russian rugby union player who generally plays as a fly half represents Russia internationally.

He was included in the Russian squad for the 2019 Rugby World Cup which is scheduled to be held in Japan for the first time and also marks his first World Cup appearance.

== Career ==
He made his international debut for Russia against Canada on 17 November 2012.

Honours

- Russian Championships (8): 2012, 2014, 2016, 2017, 2018, 2019, 2020-21, 2021-22
- Russian Cup (6): 2014, 2016, 2017, 2020, 2021, 2022
- Russian Supercup (3): 2014, 2015, 2017
- Nikolaev Cup (4): 2017, 2018, 2021, 2022
- European Rugby Continental Shield (2): 2016-17, 2017-18
- Honored Master of Sports of Russia
- Master of Sports of Russia of international class
