= Lugonzo Ligamy =

Kenyan rugby sevens player

- Born: Lugonzo Augustine Ligamy; July 29, 1992 (age 34) London
- Height: 1.83 m (6 ft 0 in)
- Weight: 86 kg (190 lb; 13 st 8 lb)

Rugby union career
National sevens team
Years	Team	Comps
- Kenya

Lugonzo Ligamy (born July 29, 1992) is a Kenyan rugby sevens player. He was selected for Kenya 7s' squad for the 2016 Summer Olympics.
