= Brian Tanga =

Kenyan rugby union player

- Born: 13 September 1995 (age 31) Busia, Kenya
- Height: 1.55 m (5 ft 1 in)
- Weight: 70 kg (11 st; 150 lb)

Rugby union career
- Position: Scrum-half / Wing
Senior career
Years	Team	Apps	(Points)
2014-	Kabras Sugar RFC	??	(??)
2022	Simbas	6	(5)
- Correct as of 19 January 2024
International career
Years	Team	Apps	(Points)
2021–	Kenya	7	(0)
- Correct as of 19 January 2024
National sevens team
Years	Team		Comps
2016–	Kenya Sevens		23 (151pts)
- Correct as of 19 January 2024

Brian Tanga (born 13 September 1995) is a Kenyan rugby union player, currently playing for the Simbas in the 2022 Currie Cup First Division. His preferred position is scrum-half or wing.

== Professional career ==
Tanga was named in the Simbas squad for the 2022 Currie Cup First Division. Tanga is a Kenyan international in both 15-a-side and sevens.

== International career ==
He represented Kenya at the 2024 Summer Olympics in Paris.
