= Sam Myers (rugby union) =

Australian rugby union player (born 1990)

- Full name: Samuel Myers
- Born: 25 May 1990 (age 36) Forbes, New South Wales, Australia
- Height: 1.90 m (6 ft 3 in)
- Weight: 100 kg (220 lb)

Rugby union career
National sevens team
Years	Team	Comps
2013-	Australia 7s	

Sam Myers (born 25 May 1990) is a professional Rugby Union player. He represents Australia in Sevens Rugby. Born in Forbes, New South Wales and playing for Northern Suburbs Rugby Club, he debuted for Australia in December 2013. As of December 2015, he currently has 17 caps.

A member of Sydney Northern Suburbs 7s side and first and second grade 15s side, Sam Myers was called up to make his debut for Australia to replace the injured Lewis Holland in the third round of the Qantas Men's Sevens 2013/2014 HSBC Sevens World Series campaign in South Africa. His combination of power and pace and ability to make numerous line breaks adds an extra dimension to the team. Sam was named in the London Sevens tournament Dream Team in May 2014 after running in seven tries during the course of the weekend, and played in every round of the 2013-14 HSBC Sevens World Series. Sam played in all but one of the legs during the 2014–15 season. Head Coach Geraint John handed Myers a full-time contract with the Men's Rugby Sevens program in September 2014. Representative Honours include Northern Suburbs Sevens – 1st and 2nd Grade and the 2014 Commonwealth Games held in Scotland.
