= Ignacio Martín (rugby union) =

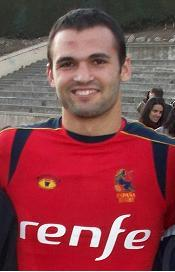
- Full name: Ignacio Amadeo Martín Goenaga
- Born: 15 October 1983 (age 43) San Sebastián, Spain
- Height: 1.88 m (6 ft 2 in)
- Weight: 90 kg (200 lb; 14 st 2 lb)

Rugby union career
Senior career
Years	Team	Apps	(Points)
- Bera Bera RT
National sevens team
Years	Team		Comps
- Spain

Ignacio Amadeo Martín Goenaga (born 15 October 1983) is a Spanish rugby sevens player. He competed at the 2016 Summer Olympics for the Spanish rugby sevens team. He was also part of the team that defeated Samoa 7s to earn the last spot for the Olympics.

Martín played at the 2013 Rugby World Cup Sevens. He is married to Juliet Itoya.
