= Tom Mitchell (rugby union, born 1989) =

English rugby union player

- Born: 22 July 1989 (age 37) Cuckfield, West Sussex, England
- Height: 1.77 m (5 ft 10 in)
- Weight: 85 kg (13 st 5 lb)
- School: Worth School
- University: Kellogg College, Oxford

Rugby union career
- Position: Back
Senior career
Years	Team	Apps	(Points)
2011	Oxford University	1	(5)
–	Harlequins		
2021	LA Giltinis		
National sevens teams
Years	Team		Comps
2012–	England 7s		
2016	Great Britain 7s		
Medal record
Men's rugby sevens
Representing Great Britain
Olympic Games
Silver medal – second place	2016 Rio de Janeiro	Team competition
Representing England
Commonwealth Games
Bronze medal – third place	2018 Gold Coast	Team competition

Tom Mitchell (born 22 July 1989) is an English rugby union player.

== Biography ==
Mitchell attended leading Worth School in West Sussex and represents England in rugby sevens and won a silver medal representing Great Britain in the 2016 Summer Olympics; he is also the captain for both teams. He debuted for England at the 2012 Wellington Sevens.

Mitchell was the leading scorer in the 2013-14 World Series, with 358 points, helping England to a fourth-place finish in the Series that year. He was one of four nominees for the 2014 World Rugby Sevens Player of the Year award, but the award was captured by Fiji's Samisoni Viriviri, the leading try scorer on the Series that year.

In 2015 he fractured his leg and dislocated his ankle during the 2014–15 Sevens World Series. He was injured during the 2014 Commonwealth Games in a match against Australia. Earlier in his career, while doing a course in Historical Studies at Kellogg College, Oxford, He played for Oxford University, scoring a try in their victory over Cambridge in the 2011 Varsity Match.

Mitchell competed for England at the 2022 Rugby World Cup Sevens in Cape Town.
