= Tom Lucas =

Australian rugby union player

- Born: 23 November 1993 (age 32)
- Height: 1.81 m (5 ft 11 1/2 in)
- Weight: 83 kg (183 lb; 13 st 1 lb)

Rugby union career
National sevens team
Years	Team	Comps
2013-	Australia 7s	

Tom Lucas (born 23 November 1993) is a professional rugby union player. He represents Australia in sevens rugby. Born in Rockhampton, Queensland and playing for Sunnybank Rugby at a senior level, he debuted for Australia in October 2013. As of December 2015, he has 13 caps. Tom Lucas is the brother of former Sevens player and Waratah Matt Lucas as well as Queensland Reds back Ben Lucas and Australian rugby union player Isaac Lucas who currently plays for Ricoh Black Rams in Japan.

Lucas was member of Australian Rugby Union's National Academy, and was a part of Sunnybank's Sevens program during the 2012 season. He was selected to play at the 2013 Oceania Sevens Championship in Fiji. He was ever-present throughout the 2013-14 IRB Sevens World Series. Representative honours include the 2014 Commonwealth Games. Tom is best friends with fellow Australian sevens player Nick Malouf. The pair met in kindergarten at Brisbane's Robertson State Primary School and played rugby union together at Sunnybank Junior Rugby Club.
