= Eden Agero =

Kenyan rugby sevens player

Personal information
- Nationality: Kenyan
- Born: 17 September 1990 (age 34)

Sport
- Sport: Rugby sevens

Eden Agero (born 17 September 1990) is a Kenyan rugby sevens player. He competed in the men's tournament at the 2020 Summer Olympics.
