= Luke Morgan (rugby union) =

Wales international rugby union player (born 1992)

- Full name: Luke Morgan
- Born: 16 May 1992 (age 34) Bridgend, Wales
- Height: 175 cm (5 ft 9 in)
- Weight: 81 kg (12 st 11 lb; 179 lb)
- School: Pencoed College

Rugby union career
- Position: Wing
- Current team: Ospreys
Senior career
Years	Team	Apps	(Points)
2011–2012	Ospreys	1	(0)
2018–	Ospreys	110	(140)
International career
Years	Team	Apps	(Points)
2011–2012	Wales U20	7	(34)
2012–2018	Wales Sevens		
2018	Wales	1	(0)
- Correct as of 14 October 2022

Luke Morgan (born 16 May 1992) is a Welsh rugby union player who plays for the Ospreys as a wing. Born in Bridgend, Wales, he was a Wales under-20 and Wales Sevens international.

== Rugby career ==
Morgan made his debut for the Ospreys in 2011 having previously played for the Ospreys academy, Bridgend Ravens, Bridgend Athletic RFC, Llanelli RFC, Newport RFC and the Ospreys Development team, but switched to rugby sevens in 2012, despite signing a three year development contract with the Ospreys in 2011. During the 2012 Six Nations Under 20s Championship, scored twice against Scotland. While with Bridgend, Morgan was the top try scorer for the 2011–12 Welsh Premiership season, his father accepting the award on his behalf as he was away with Wales U20 for the 2012 IRB Junior World Championship.

In 2016 Morgan was selected as part of the Great Britain sevens team which travelled to Moscow to take part in the Rugby Europe Grand Prix Sevens, and was part of the royals team that won the Silver Plate. An ACL injury caused Morgan to miss the 2016 Summer Olympics.

Morgan was later selected to represent Wales at the 2018 Rugby World Cup Sevens in San Francisco. While playing in the World Cup, Morgan was involved in an off-the-pitch incident with Samoan player, Gordon Langkilde, which resulted in Morgan receiving facial injuries whilst teammate Tom Williams suffered a broken nose and cheekbone. The Wales players were not sanctioned for the affray and Langkilde was banned from rugby for a year. After becoming Wales' all-time record try scorer at sevens level, Morgan switched back to 15-a-side rugby in 2018, rejoining the Ospreys. He made his Pro14 debut on 14 September 2018 against Munster.

In October 2018 Morgan was called up to the senior Wales squad by Warren Gatland. Morgan made his debut against Scotland, starting on the wing. In March 2019, Morgan extended his contract with the Ospreys, and signed a further extension in 2021. on 7 June Luke signed a further contract extension with the ospreys
