= Paula Dranisinukula =

- Born: Paula Dranisinukula; 23 September 1989 (age 37) Navuniivi, Rakiraki
- Height: 1.87 m (6 ft 1 1/2 in)
- Weight: 97 kg (15 st 4 lb)
- School: Ratu Kadavulevu School
- Occupation(s): Soldier Fiji Military, Rugby Sevens Player

Rugby union career
Amateur team(s)
Years	Team	Apps	(Points)
–	Fiji Army		

Paula Dranisinukula MOF (born 23 Sep 1989) is a forward in the Fiji national rugby sevens team and a soldier in the Republic of Fiji Military Forces. Dranisinukula made his debut for the Fiji national rugby sevens team in the 2017 Paris Sevens competition. Dranisinukula's favourite quotation is the Bible verse, Philipians 4:13 "I can do all things through Christ who strengthens me."
