= Harvey Elms =

Scottish rugby union player

- Born: Harvey Elms; 2 June 1995 (age 31) North Berwick, Scotland
- Height: 6 ft 0 in (1.83 m)
- Weight: 85 kg (187 lb)
- School: North Berwick High School

Rugby union career
- Position: Full-back / Centre / Wing
Amateur team(s)
Years	Team	Apps	(Points)
- North Berwick
- Currie
Senior career
Years	Team	Apps	(Points)
2020-21	Glasgow Warriors		
International career
Years	Team	Apps	(Points)
- Scotland U20
2015-16	Scotland Club XV		
National sevens team
Years	Team		Comps
2017 - present	Scotland 7's		25

Harvey Elms (born 2 June 1995) is a Scotland 7's international rugby union player.

== Rugby Union career ==
=== Amateur career ===
He played for North Berwick and then Currie.

=== Professional career ===
In a covid-19 hit season 2020-21 he was with the Glasgow Warriors squad. He did not manage a first team competitive game for the Warriors - but played for their 'A' side at Centre against Edinburgh 'A' on 4 February 2021. At the end of the season, Elms was thanked in a 'leavers video' by the club for his support to the squad over the season.

=== International career ===
He received a cap for Scotland U20 before receiving an injury which kept him out of the remainder of the U20 campaign.

He played for Scotland Club XV in 2015 and 2016.

He received his debut cap for Scotland 7's in 2017 in the Dubai leg of the World Rugby Sevens. He played in the 2018 Sevens World Cup. He competed at the 2022 Rugby World Cup Sevens in Cape Town.

== Outside of rugby union ==
Elms is a talented artist. He made the East Lothian Courier newspaper headlines for taking art commissions during the covid-19 pandemic.
