= Amenoni Nasilasila =

Fijian rugby union footballer (born 1992)

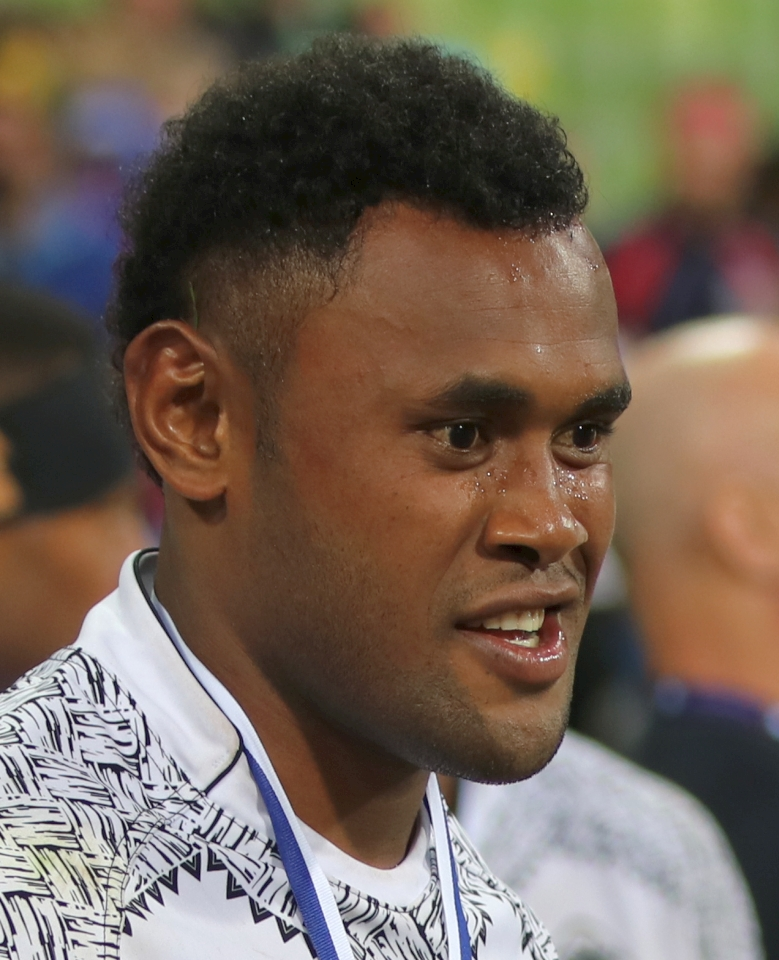
- Nasilasila in 2017
- Born: 8 February 1992 (age 34) Namatakula, Nadroga
- Height: 170 cm (5 ft 7 in)
- Weight: 80 kg (12 st 8 lb; 180 lb)

Rugby union career
- Position(s): Flyhalf, scrumhalf, wing
Senior career
Years	Team	Apps	(Points)
2016–19	Navosa		
National sevens team
Years	Team		Comps
2014–2019	Fiji 7s		102
- Correct as of 13 Dec 2017

Amenoni Nasilasila (born 8 February 1992) is a Fijian rugby union footballer. He had played for the Fiji sevens team. Nasilasila made his debut for Fiji 7s at the 2014 Dubai Sevens.

== Career ==
Nasilasila grew up in Namatakula, where rugby players in his family included his uncle Noa Nadruku and his cousin Lote Tuqiri. He played rugby league and was part of the Fiji Residents Rugby league side, a feeder for the Fiji Bati. After three years he switched to rugby union joining a local 7's club, Ratu Filise. He was spotted by then coach Ben Ryan who saw him playing in one of the local tournaments and included him in his extended side for the 2014 Gold Coast Sevens; an injury ruled him out. He made his debut at the 2014 Dubai Sevens making his debut against France scoring a try in their 54–7 win.

He also represented his provincial side, Navosa in the Skipper Cup playing at playmaker and halfback. He captained the Fiji Barbarians 7's side top the SUDAmerica 7's in December 2016.

He was included by the new Fiji 7's coach, Gareth Baber for the 2016–17 World Rugby Sevens Series.

Nasilasila was selected as the 13th man for the first tournament, of the 2017–18 World Rugby Sevens Series, the 2017 Dubai Sevens and because of an injury to Waisea Nacuqu on the first day was selected for the main team, and made the main team for the 2017 South Africa Sevens. He was named the DHL Impact Player of the Cape Town 7s.

== Rape conviction ==
On October 23, 2019, Nasilasila was sentenced to eight years imprisonment for raping a 24-year-old woman on December 22, 2018. The incident took place at a settlement in Sigatoka. He was released from prison early in October 2025 after serving just under 6 years behind bars.

He was named to play for Malolo Rugby in the Skipper Cup Final and was even named in the 23 but he was removed on game day as he did not qualify since he did not play any other games for them this season forcing Malolo to field 22 players only against Naitasiri but they still managed to win the final.
