= Lautaro Bazán =

Argentine rugby union player

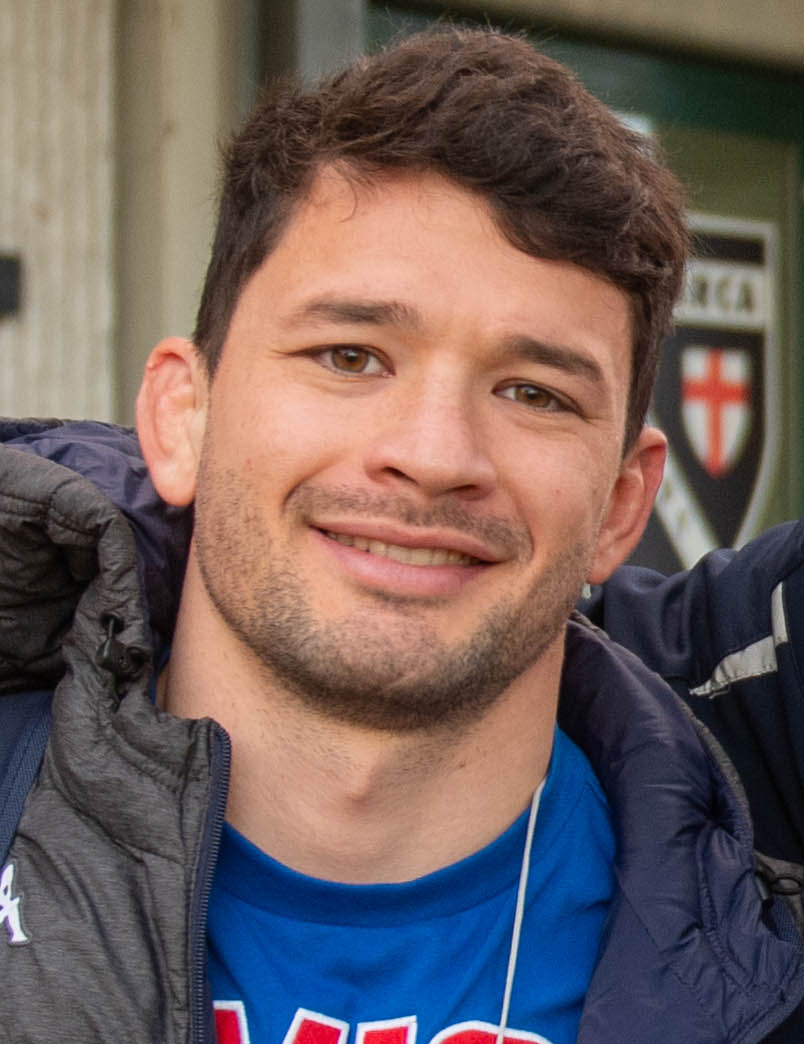
- Full name: Lautaro Bazán Velez
- Born: 24 February 1996 (age 30) Cordoba, Argentina
- Height: 1.74 m (5 ft 9 in)
- Weight: 80 kg (176 lb; 12 st 8 lb)

Rugby union career
- Position: Scrum-half
- Current team: Cordoba Atletico
Senior career
Years	Team	Apps	(Points)
2014–2015	Cordoba Atletico	6	(9)
2022–2024	Rovigo Delta	20	(20)
2024–2025	Benetton Hyderabad Heroes	3	(0)
- Correct as of 28 August 2023
International career
Years	Team	Apps	(Points)
2014–2016	Argentina U20	13	(20)
2016–2020	Argentina XV	11	(20)
2022–	Argentina	8	(0)
- Correct as of 28 August 2023
National sevens team
Years	Team		Comps
2016−2022	Argentina		37
- Correct as of 28 August 2023
Medal record
Men's rugby sevens
Representing Argentina
Pan American Games
Gold medal – first place	2019 Lima	Team competition
Summer Olympics
Bronze medal – third place	2020 Tokyo	Team competition
Youth Olympic Games
Silver medal – second place	2014 Nanjing	Team competition

Lautaro Bazán Velez (born 24 February 1996) is an Argentine professional rugby union player who plays as a scrum-half for the Argentina national team and Argentina Sevens.

He played for Serie A Elite club Rovigo Delta from 2022 to 2024. He signed for Benetton Rugby in June 2024 ahead of the 2024–25 United Rugby Championship. He made his debut in Round 7 of the 2024–25 season against the Edinburgh Rugby. He played with Benetton in the United Rugby Championship until 2025.

== International career ==
Bazán played for Argentina in 15 a side rugby union at junior level, and won bronze at the 2016 U20 World Championships in England. He won gold at the 2019 Pan American Games in Lima, Peru. He was named in the Argentina squad for the Rugby sevens at the 2020 Summer Olympics.

In summer 2022 he was named in the full Argentina squad. He also previously played for Argentina from 2016 to 2020. In November 2022 he was again called up to the full Argentina squad whilst they touring the northern hemisphere.

He was a try scorer in the third/fourth playoff at the SVNS World Championship in Los Angeles in May 2025, as Argentina finished in fourth place overall.
