= Jona Nareki =

Fijian rugby union player

- Full name: Jona Malanicagi Nareki
- Born: 27 December 1997 (age 28) Sigatoka, Fiji
- Height: 175 cm (5 ft 9 in)
- Weight: 83 kg (183 lb; 13 st 1 lb)
- School: Feilding High School

Rugby union career
- Position: Wing
- Current team: Otago, Highlanders
Senior career
Years	Team	Apps	(Points)
2017–	Otago	67	(190)
2020–	Highlanders	59	(120)
- Correct as of 17 May 2026
International career
Years	Team	Apps	(Points)
2017	New Zealand U20	3	(10)
- Correct as of 17 May 2026
National sevens team
Years	Team		Comps
2017–2019	New Zealand		15
- Correct as of 22 October 2022

Jona Malanicagi Nareki is a Fijian rugby union player who plays for the Highlanders in Super Rugby. He plays on the wing. He has signed for the Highlanders squad in 2020.
