= Adam Thomas (rugby union) =

Welsh rugby union footballer

- Born: 22 August 1986 (age 40) Ynysybwl, Wales
- Height: 1.88 m (6 ft 2 in)
- Weight: 95 kg (209 lb)

Rugby union career
International career
Years	Team	Apps	(Points)
2011–2013	Wales 7's		

Adam Thomas, born 22 August 1986 in Ynysybwl, Wales, is a rugby union player for Pontypridd RFC in the Principality Premiership.

Thomas was drafted to the Pontypridd squad from his local Ynysybwl RFC club after having impressed the coaching staff during the Silver Ball cup final of 2005.

During the summer of 2009, Thomas flew to New Zealand to play for Waikaka White Star RFC, impressing the provincial staff enough to be called into the training squad for the Air New Zealand Cup team, Southland Rugby.

Thomas's position of choice is as a centre.

Thomas represented Wales in the 2013 Rugby World Cup Sevens.
