= Gastón Revol =

Argentine rugby union player

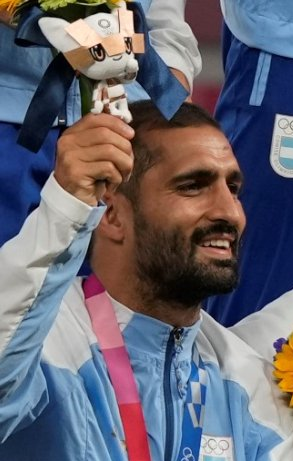
- Revol in 2021
- Born: 26 November 1986 (age 39) Córdoba, Argentina
- Height: 170 cm (5 ft 7 in)
- Weight: 76 kg (168 lb)

Rugby union career
- Position: Scrum-half
- Current team: La Tablada
National sevens team
Years	Team	Comps
2009–2021	Argentina	81
- Correct as of 22 July 2021
Medal record
Men's rugby sevens
Representing Argentina
Olympic Games
Bronze medal – third place	2020 Tokyo	Team competition
World Games
Silver medal – second place	2013 Cali	Team competition
Pan American Games
Gold medal – first place	2019 Lima	Team competition
Gold medal – first place	2023 Santiago	Team competition

Gastón Revol (born 26 November 1986) is an Argentine rugby union player. He plays rugby sevens for Argentina 7s.

== Rugby career ==
Revol debuted for Argentina at the 2009 London Sevens. He captained Argentina 7s at the 2016 Summer Olympics. He also captained Argentina again at the 2022 Rugby World Cup Sevens in Cape Town.

Revol represented Argentina at the 2024 Summer Olympics in Paris.
