= Richard Haughton =

England international rugby union player

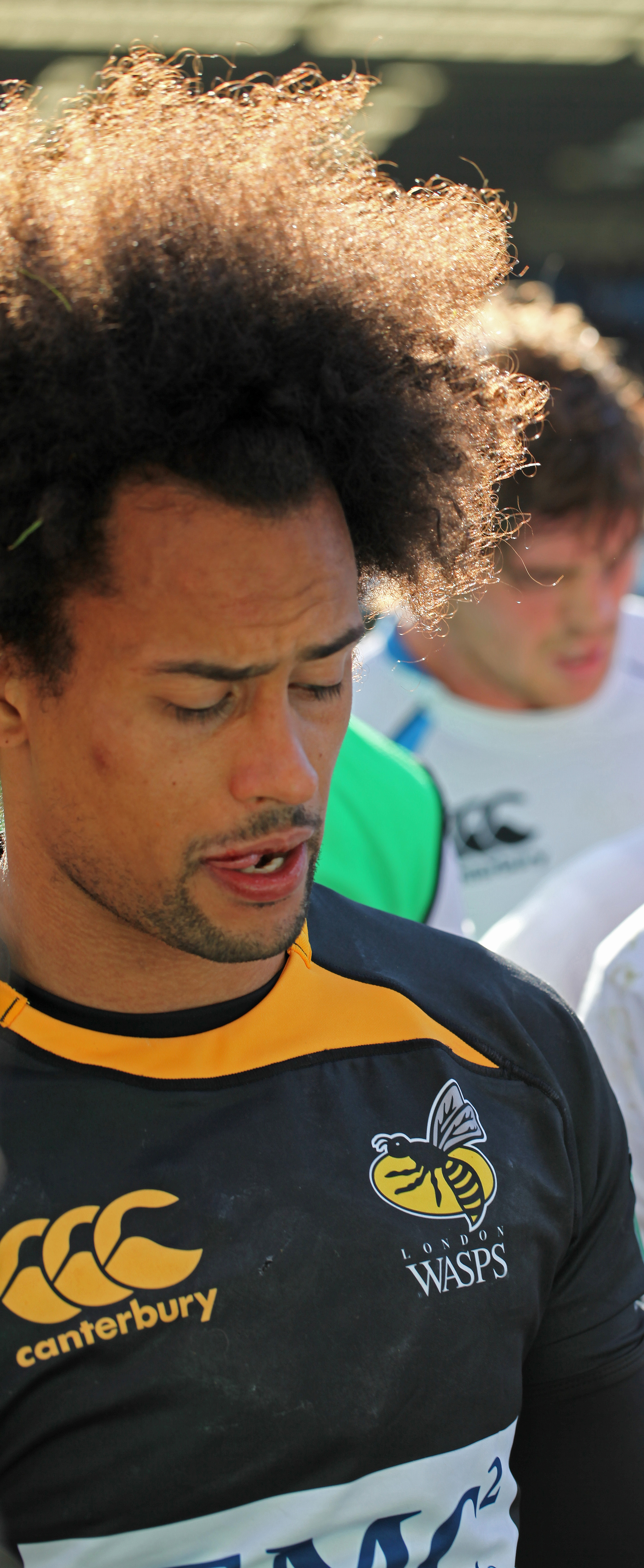
- Born: 8 November 1980 (age 46) Luton, Bedfordshire, England
- Height: 1.85 m (6 ft 1 in)
- Weight: 84 kg (13 st 3 lb; 185 lb)

Rugby union career
- Position(s): Wing, Fullback
Senior career
Years	Team	Apps	(Points)
2000–2010	Saracens	165	(170)
2010–2012	London Wasps	38	(20)
2012	Jersey		
2012–2015	USA Perpignan		
International career
Years	Team	Apps	(Points)
- England
Refereeing career
Years	Competition		Apps
2016–	WR Sevens Series		
Medal record
Men's rugby sevens
Representing England
Commonwealth Games
Silver medal – second place	2006 Melbourne	Team competition

Richard Haughton (born 8 November 1980) is an English former rugby union player who currently works as a rugby referee.

He was educated at St John's School, Leatherhead. He played on the wing or at fullback for Perpignan in the Top 14, and was a member of England Saxons and England Sevens squads. He also played for London Wasps and Saracens. Haughton joined Perpignan in 2012, prior to which he played for Jersey for 2 months.

Haughton currently works as a rugby sevens referee on the World Rugby Sevens Series.
