= Mike Fuailefau =

Canada international rugby union player

Personal information
- Born: March 20, 1992 (age 34) Victoria, British Columbia, Canada
- Height: 186 cm (6 ft 1 in)
- Weight: 100 kg (220 lb)
Medal record
Men's Rugby sevens
Representing Canada
Pan American Games
Gold medal – first place	2015 Toronto	Team

Mike Fuailefau (born March 20, 1992) is a Canadian rugby union player, in the sevens discipline. Fuailefau is of Samoan heritage, as his father is from there.

== Career ==
Fuailefau was part of Canada's 2014 Commonwealth Games and 2018 Commonwealth Games, with both teams getting knocked out in the group stage.

Fuailefau won gold as part of Canada's team at the 2015 Pan American Games in Toronto.

In June 2021, Fuailefau was named to Canada's 2020 Olympic team.
