= Lewis Holland =

- Born: 14 January 1993 (age 33) Queanbeyan, New South Wales, Australia
- Height: 1.82 m (5 ft 11 1/2 in)
- Weight: 83 kg (183 lb; 13 st 1 lb)
- School: St Edmund's College, Canberra

Rugby union career
Amateur team(s)
Years	Team	Apps	(Points)
–	Queanbeyan Whites		
Super Rugby
Years	Team	Apps	(Points)
2020–2021	Rebels	3	(0)
- Correct as of 22 November 2021
International career
Years	Team	Apps	(Points)
2010	Australia Schoolboys		
2012	Australia U20		
National sevens team
Years	Team		Comps
2011–	Australia 7s		51

Lewis Holland (born 14 January 1993) is a professional rugby union player who represents Australia in rugby sevens. Born in Queanbeyan, New South Wales and playing for Queanbeyan Whites at a club level, he debuted for Australia in February 2011. As of December 2015, he had 28 caps.

== Rugby career ==
Holland made his debut in 2011. He represented both his state and country in 2010 while attending St Edmund's College, Canberra. Holland played Australian Schoolboys alongside former 7s teammate Tom Cusack. In 2012, Holland and Cusack reunited in Australian colours again at the IRB Junior World Championship. Representative Honours include Australian Schoolboys (2010), Australian Under 20s (2012) and the Rugby World Cup in 2013, where he scored a try.

Holland competed at the 2016 Summer Olympics.

Holland was a member of the Australian men's rugby seven's squad at the Tokyo 2020 Olympics. The team came third in their pool round and then lost to Fiji 19-nil in the quarterfinal. Full details.

=== Rebels ===
As a result of the COVID-19 pandemic, Holland signed-on to play for Super Rugby team Melbourne Rebels during the temporary 2020 Super Rugby AU season.

== Super Rugby statistics ==
As of 12 June 2021

Season	Team	Games	Starts	Sub	Mins	Tries	Cons	Pens	Drops	Points	Yel	Red
2020 AU	Rebels	0	0	0	0	0	0	0	0	0	0	0
2021 AU	Rebels	3	1	2	127	0	0	0	0	0	0	0
2021 TT	Rebels	0	0	0	0	0	0	0	0	0	0	0
Total		3	1	2	127	0	0	0	0	0	0	0
