= 2017–18 World Rugby Sevens Series squads =

World Rugby Sevens 2017–18 squads Series XIX
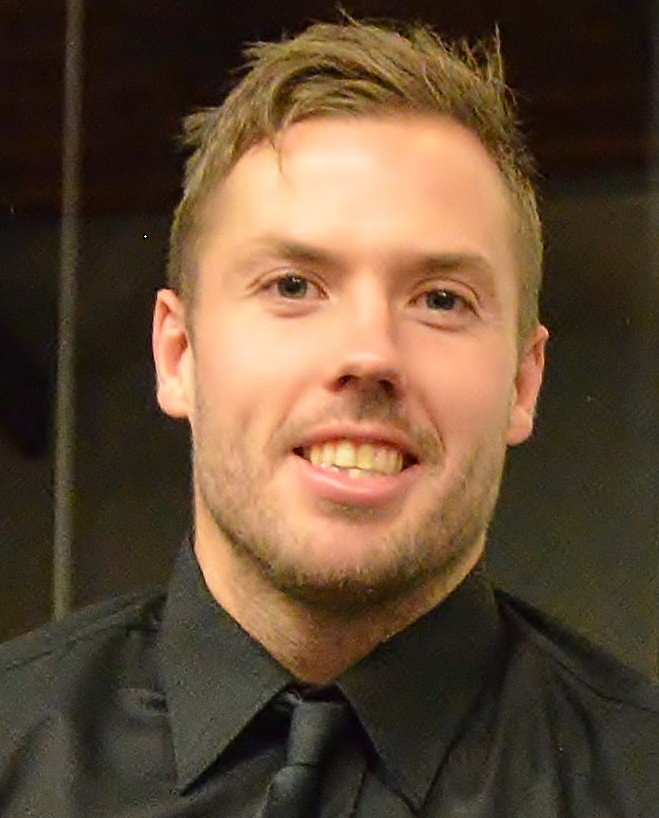
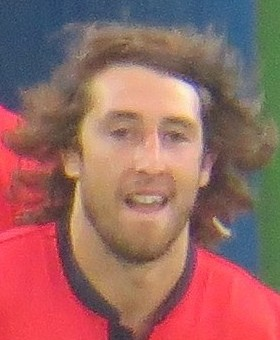
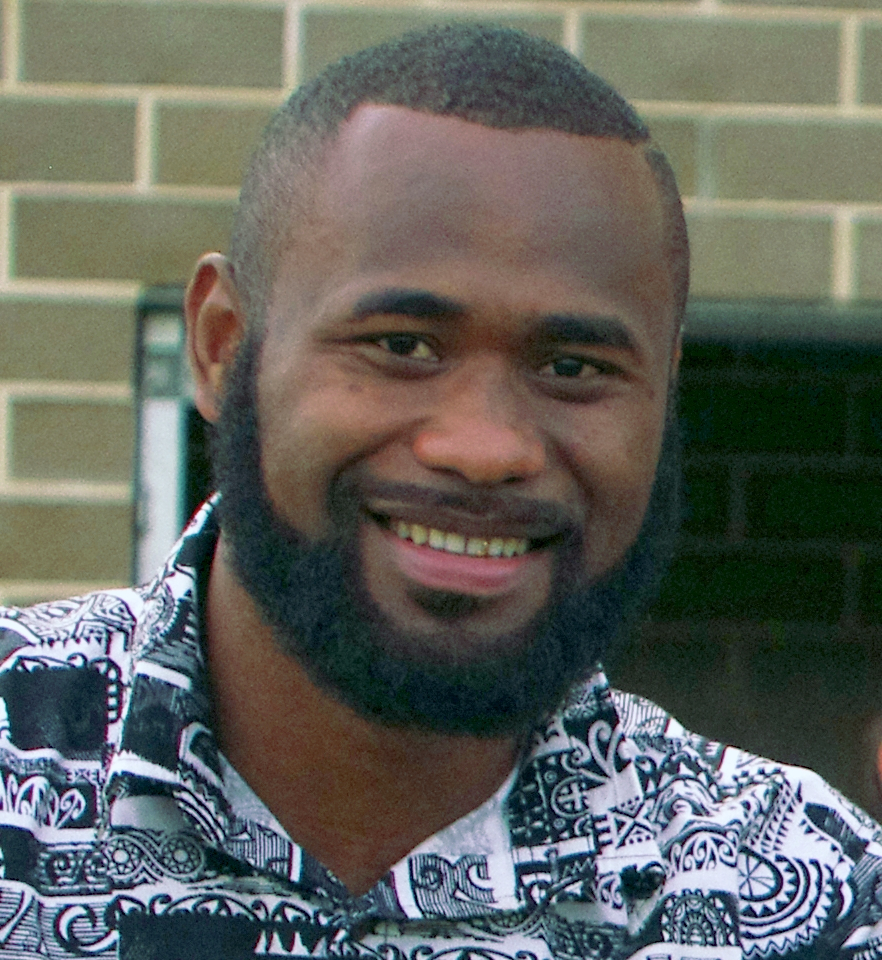
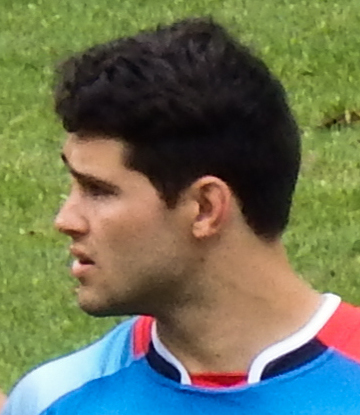
- Players in Series XIX. Clockwise from top left: Tim Mikkelson of New Zealand, Dan Bibby of England, Madison Hughes of the United States and Semi Radradra of Fiji.

This is a list of the complete squads for the 2017–18 World Rugby Sevens Series.

Captains for a tournament have their numbers marked in bold.

== Argentina ==
Coach: (Argentina) Santiago Gómez Cora

Argentina team members 2017–18
Player	Position	Affiliation	Number									
Player	Position	Affiliation	Dubai	Cape Town	Sydney	Hamilton	Las Vegas	Vancouver	Hong Kong	Singapore	London	Paris
Santiago Álvarez	Forward	Jaguares	–	1	–	–	–	–	6	–	6	6
Gastón Arias	Back	SIC	5	5	–	–	–	–	–	–	–	–
Renzo Barbier	Back		–	–	–	–	1	1	1	1	–	–
Lautaro Bazan Velez	Back		7	7	7	7	7	7	7	7	7	7
Felipe del Mestre	Back		10	10	10	10	10	10	10	10	–	–
Bautista Delguy	Back	Jaguares	–	8	–	–	–	–	–	–	–	–
Julián Domínguez	Forward	Pucará	6	6	–	–	–	–	–	–	3	13
Seve Escobio	Forward		–	–	5	5	5	5	–	5	–	2
Rodrigo Etchart	Back	SIC	9	9	–	–	–	–	5	–	5	5
Maximiliano Filizzola	Back	Marista	13	13	6	6	6	13	–	6	–	–
Matías Freyre			–	–	–	–	–	–	–	13	–	–
Luciano Gonzalez	Back		11	11	11	11	11	11	11	11	11	11
Fernando Luna	Forward	Córdoba Athletic	1	–	1	–	–	–	–	–	–	–
Santiago Mare	Forward		2	2	2	2	2	2	13	8	1	1
Nicolas Menendez	Back		–	–	–	–	–	–	–	3	13	3
Marcos Moroni	Forward		4	4	4	4	4	4	4	4	4	4
Matias Osadczuk	Forward	SITAS	–	–	9	9	9	9	9	–	9	9
Tomás Passaro	Back	CUBA	–	–	–	–	13	6	–	–	–	–
Maximo Provenzano	Back	Alumni	–	–	13	1	12	12	–	12	–	12
Gastón Revol	Back	La Tablada	**8**	–	**8**	**8**	**8**	**8**	**8**	–	**8**	**8**
Juan Rosas Paz	Back		–	–	–	–	–	–	–	–	10	10
Conrado Roura	Forward	Palermo Bajo	3	3	3	3	3	3	3	–	–	–
Franco Sábato	Back		12	**12**	12	12	–	–	12	–	12	–
Germán Schulz	Back	Tala	–	–	–	–	–	–	2	**2**	2	–

== Australia ==
Coach:

- (Australia) Andy Friend – to Vancouver.
- (Australia) Jarred Hodges – Hong Kong (Note: Substituting for Friend, who opted to take his squad to the 2018 Commonwealth Games)
- (Australia) Tim Walsh – from Singapore onwards.

Australia team members 2017–18
Player	Position	Affiliation	Number									
Player	Position	Affiliation	Dubai	Cape Town	Sydney	Hamilton	Las Vegas	Vancouver	Hong Kong	Singapore	London	Paris
Lachie Anderson	Forward	Eastwood	12	12	12	12	12	12	–	12	12	12
Tim Anstee	Forward	Eastwood	7	7	7	7	7	7	–	7	7	7
James Armstrong			–	–	–	–	–	–	5	–	–	–
Henry Clunies-Ross			–	–	–	–	–	–	6	–	–	–
Tom Connor	Forward	Sydney Rays	–	–	2	2	2	2	–	2	2	–
Sam Croke	Forward		–	–	–	8	–	–	3	–	–	–
Sam Figg			–	–	–	–	–	–	9	–	–	–
Con Foley	Forward		–	–	–	–	–	–	**8**	–	–	–
Harrison Goddard	Back	Rebels	–	–	–	–	–	–	4	–	–	–
Lewis Holland	Back	Queanbeyan	**4**	**4**	**4**	–	**4**	**4**	–	–	**4**	**4**
Matthew Hood	Back		13	1	–	13	–	–	–	–	–	–
Ed Jenkins	Forward		9	–	–	–	–	–	–	–	–	–
Simon Kennewell	Back		2	2	–	–	–	–	–	–	–	–
Boyd Killingworth	Forward	Warringah	8	8	8	–	–	–	–	–	9	9
Maurice Longbottom	Back		11	11	11	11	–	–	–	11	11	11
Tom Lucas	Back	Sunnybank	–	–	13	4	11	11	–	–	10	10
Liam McNamara	Back		–	–	–	–	–	–	–	–	13	8
Matt McTaggart			–	–	–	–	–	–	11	–	–	–
Lachie Miller	Back		–	–	–	–	–	–	10	4	–	–
Sam Myers	Forward	Norths	3	3	3	3	–	–	–	3	3	3
Ben O'Donnell	Back	Randwick	10	10	10	10	10	10	–	10	5	5
Jesse Parahi	Forward	Norths	–	–	9	–	8	8	–	**8**	–	–
Dylan Pietsch	Back		–	–	–	9	9	9	2	13	–	2
Joe Pincus	Back		–	–	–	–	–	–	–	–	1	13
John Porch	Back	Norths	6	6	6	6	6	6	–	6	6	–
Nicky Price	Back		–	–	–	–	–	–	7	5	–	–
Brandon Quinn	Back		1	13	–	–	13	13	–	9	–	6
Triston Reilly	Back		–	–	–	–	–	–	12	–	8	–
Jeral Skelton	Forward		–	9	–	–	3	3	1	1	–	1
James Stannard	Back	Souths	5	5	5	**5**	5	5	–	–	–	–
Charlie Taylor	Back	Manly	–	–	1	1	1	1	–	–	–	–
Nicko Tuvitu			–	–	–	–	–	–	13	–	–	–

- Notes:

== Canada ==
Coach: (England) Damian McGrath

Canada team members 2017–18
Player	Position	Affiliation	Number									
Player	Position	Affiliation	Dubai	Cape Town	Sydney	Hamilton	Las Vegas	Vancouver	Hong Kong	Singapore	London	Paris
Phil Berna	Forward		12	12	12	–	–	–	–	–	–	–
Luke Bradley	Back		–	–	–	1	13	–	–	13	4	4
Connor Braid	Back		2	6	–	–	6	6	6	–	6	6
Tevaughn Campbell	Back	Montreal Alouettes (CFL)	–	–	–	7	7	5	7	6	–	–
Admir Cejvanovic	Back		13	2	–	–	2	2	2	2	2	2
Andrew Coe	Forward		–	–	–	–	1	–	13	4	13	1
Jared Douglas	Back		–	–	2	2	–	–	8	8	–	–
Justin Douglas	Back		8	8	8	8	8	8	–	–	8	8
Mike Fuailefau	Forward		3	3	3	–	3	3	3	3	3	3
Lucas Hammond	Back		7	7	7	–	–	7	–	7	7	7
Nathan Hirayama	Back		9	9	9	9	9	9	9	**9**	**9**	**9**
Harry Jones	Forward		**11**	**11**	**11**	**11**	**11**	**11**	11	11	11	11
Isaac Kaay	Forward		6	5	5	6	12	12	12	12	12	12
Pat Kay	Back		10	10	10	10	10	10	10	10	10	10
Luke McCloskey	Back		–	–	6	5	5	13	5	5	5	5
John Moonlight	Forward		4	4	4	4	4	4	**4**	–	–	
Josiah Morra	Forward		–	–	–	3	–	–	–	–	–	13
Matt Mullins	Back		1	1	1	13	–	1	1	1	1	–
Jake Thiel	Forward		–	–	13	12	–	–	–	–	–	–
Liam Underwood	Back		5	13	–	–	–	–	–	–	–	–

== England ==
Coach: (England) Simon Amor (Note: for the 2018 Hong Kong Sevens, Tony Roques takes his place)

England team members 2017–18
Player	Position	Affiliation	Number									
Player	Position	Affiliation	Dubai	Cape Town	Sydney	Hamilton	Las Vegas	Vancouver	Hong Kong	Singapore	London	Paris
Dan Bibby	Back		–	–	7	7	7	7	–	7	7	7
Tom Bowen	Back		8	8	8	8	8	–	–	–	13	8
Phil Burgess	Forward		3	3	3	3	3	3	–	3	3	3
George Chatterton			–	–	–	–	–	–	5	–	–	–
Alex Davis	Back		–	–	12	–	–	–	12	12	8	–
Richard de Carpentier	Forward		1	1	1	1	1	1	–	1	–	–
William Edwards	Back		7	7	–	13	13	13	6	–	–	13
Mike Ellery	Forward		–	–	2	2	2	–	–	–	1	1
Harry Glover	Back		2	12	–	–	12	12	–	–	12	12
Will Glover	Forward		–	13	–	–	–	–	11	–	–	–
Fergus Guiry			–	–	–	–	–	–	13	–	–	–
Charlie Hayter	Forward		13	2	–	–	–	2	2	2	2	2
Ben Howard	Forward	Worcester Warriors	12	–	–	–	–	–	10	–	–	–
Charlton Kerr	Forward		–	–	–	–	–	–	9	11	–	–
Charlie Kingham			–	–	–	–	–	–	3	–	–	–
Oliver Lindsay-Hague	Back		9	9	9	9	9	9	–	9	9	9
Ruaridh McConnochie	Back	Bath	10	10	10	10	10	10	–	10	–	–
Tom Mitchell	Back		**6**	**6**	**6**	**6**	**6**	**6**	–	**6**	**6**	**6**
Dan Norton	Back		4	4	4	4	4	4	–	4	4	4
Ryan Olowofela	Back		–	–	13	12	–	8	7	13	10	10
James Rodwell	Forward		5	5	5	5	5	5	–	5	5	5
Callum Sirker			–	–	–	–	–	–	4	–	–	–
Charlie Spawforth			–	–	–	–	–	–	8	–	–	–
Ethan Waddleton	Forward		11	11	11	11	11	11	–	–	11	11
Will Wilson			–	–	–	–	–	–	1	–	–	–

- Notes:

== Fiji ==
Coach: (Wales) Gareth Baber

Fiji team members 2017–18
Player	Position	Affiliation	Number									
Player	Position	Affiliation	Dubai	Cape Town	Sydney	Hamilton	Las Vegas	Vancouver	Hong Kong	Singapore	London	Paris
Uluiyata Batinisavu	Forward		–	–	–	–	–	6	–	–	–	–
Apenesa Cakaubalavu	Forward		5	5	–	5	–	–	–	–	–	–
Apete Daveta	Back		–	–	13	–	–	–	–	–	–	–
Apisai Domolailai	Forward		1	1	–	–	–	–	–	–	–	–
Paula Dranisinukula	Forward		4	4	4	4	4	4	4	4	4	4
Isake Katonibau	Forward		–	–	–	–	–	–	5	5	–	–
Semi Kunatani	Forward		–	–	–	–	–	–	1	–	–	5
Mesulame Kunavula	Forward		7	7	7	7	7	7	7	7	–	13
Sevuloni Mocenacagi	Back		–	–	3	3	1	1	–	1	1	1
Vasikali Mudu	Forward		–	–	5	13	5	13	–	–	–	–
Waisea Nacuqu	Back		8	–	8	–	13	5	13	8	10	7
Alasio Sovita Naduva	Back		–	–	12	10	10	10	10	10	13	10
Amenoni Nasilasila	Back		13	8	10	12	12	12	12	12	12	12
Kalione Nasoko	Forward		3	3	1	1	3	3	3	3	3	3
Keponi Paul	Back		–	–	–	–	–	–	–	6	–	–
Semi Radradra	Forward		–	–	–	–	–	–	–	–	5	–
Vatemo Ravouvou	Back		12	12	–	8	8	8	8	–	8	8
Eroni Sau	Back		11	11	11	11	11	11	11	11	11	11
John Stewart	Back		10	10	–	–	–	–	–	–	–	–
Terio Tamani	Back		–	–	–	–	–	–	–	13	–	–
Josua Tuisova	Back		–	–	–	–	–	–	–	–	7	–
Jerry Tuwai	Back		**9**	**9**	**9**	**9**	**9**	**9**	**9**	**9**	**9**	**9**
Josua Vakurunabili	Forward		2	2	2	2	2	2	2	2	2	2
Jasa Veremalua	Forward		6	6	6	6	6	–	–	–	6	6
Samisoni Viriviri	Back		–	–	–	–	–	–	6	–	–	–

== France ==
Coach: (France) Jérôme Daret

France team members 2017–18
Player	Position	Affiliation	Number									
Player	Position	Affiliation	Dubai	Cape Town	Sydney	Hamilton	Las Vegas	Vancouver	Hong Kong	Singapore	London	Paris
Jérémy Aicardi	Forward		13	12	–	–	13	13	–	9	–	–
Samuel Alerte	Forward		3	3	–	–	–	–	1	12	–	–
Jean-Pascal Barraque	Back	Bordeaux	10	10	10	10	10	10	10	–	10	10
Steeve Barry	Back		–	–	12	12	–	–	–	–	4	9
Bastien Berenguel	Forward		7	7	9	9	–	–	–	–	11	–
Kevin Bly	Back	Vannes	–	–	–	–	–	–	–	–	12	7
Paul Bonnefond	Back		–	–	8	–	2	–	9	10	**9**	11
Pierre Boudehent	Forward	La Rochelle	–	–	–	–	–	–	–	–	3	8
Terry Bouhraoua	Back		–	–	–	–	–	–	4	–	–	4
Robinson Caire	Back		–	–	–	–	–	–	–	11	–	–
Manoël Dall'igna	Forward		**2**	**2**	**2**	**2**	–	–	**2**	**2**	–	**2**
Josias Daoudou	Back		11	11	–	–	–	–	–	7	–	–
Johan Demai-Hamecher	Back		8	8	7	7	–	2	–	–	8	–
Josias Daoudou	Back		11	11	–	–	–	–	–	–	–	–
Thomas Hecquet	Back		–	13	–	–	–	–	–	13	–	–
Nisie Huyard	Back		–	–	–	–	–	–	7	–	–	–
Olivier Klemenczak	Back		–	–	–	–	–	–	–	1	–	–
Alexandre Lagarde	Forward		–	–	–	–	–	–	–	5	–	12
Charles Lagarde	Back		–	–	11	11	–	–	12	6	–	–
Pierre Gilles Lakafia	Forward		–	–	–	1	**8**	8	8	8	–	–
Jonathan Laugel	Forward		1	–	–	–	1	1	–	–	1	1
Guillaume Manevy	Forward		–	–	–	–	–	–	–	–	2	–
Jean Baptiste Manevy	Forward		–	–	–	8	–	–	–	–	–	–
Jean-Baptiste Mazoué	Forward		–	1	13	–	3	3	3	3	–	–
Thibauld Mazzoleni	Back		4	4	–	5	4	4	5	–	–	–
Pierre Mignot	Forward		–	–	–	–	–	–	–	–	7	–
Stephen Parez	Back		5	5	5	13	5	–	–	–	5	5
Pierre Popelin	Back		–	–	4	4	–	5	13	4	–	–
Paulin Riva	Back		6	6	6	6	6	6	6	–	6	6
Pierre Sayerse	Back		–	–	–	–	7	7	–	–	–	–
Remi Siega			–	–	–	–	–	–	–	–	13	13
Sacha Valleau	Forward		–	–	1	–	11	11	–	–	–	–
Tavite Veredamu	Forward		9	9	3	3	9	9	11	–	–	3
Gabin Villière	Back		–	–	–	–	12	12	–	–	–	–

== Kenya ==
Coach: (Kenya) Innocent Simiyu

Kenya team members 2017–18
Player	Position	Affiliation	Number									
Player	Position	Affiliation	Dubai	Cape Town	Sydney	Hamilton	Las Vegas	Vancouver	Hong Kong	Singapore	London	Paris
Eden Agero	Forward	SportPesa Quins	7	13	6	7	7	7	7	7	7	
Willy Ambaka	Forward	SportPesa Quins	12	12	12	12	12	12	12	12	12	
Andrew Amonde	Forward	KCB	–	–	7	8	8	8	8	8	8	
Oscar Ayodi	Back	Homeboyz	**1**	**1**	–	–	–	–	–	–	1	
Herman Humwa	Back	SportPesa Quins	4	4	–	–	–	–	–	13	3	
Collins Injera	Back	Mwamba	11	–	–	–	11	11	11	11	11	
Augustine Lugonzo	Back	Homeboyz	–	–	13	4	–	–	13	4	4	
Ian Minjire	Back	Impala Saracens	–	–	–	–	–	–	4	1	–	
Samuel Ngethe	Back		–	11	4	13	13	4	–	–	13	
Billy Odhiambo	Back	Strathmore University	–	–	–	–	5	5	5	5	5	
Samuel Oliech	Back	Impala Saracens	5	5	9	10	10	10	–	10	–	
Jeffery Oluoch	Forward	Homeboyz	8	8	5	6	6	6	6	6	6	
Dennis Ombachi	Forward	Nondescripts	6	–	–	–	–	–	–	–	–	
Erick Ombasa	Back	Oilers	–	–	–	5	4	13	–	–	2	
Oscar Ouma	Forward	Nakuru	–	3	**3**	**3**	**3**	**3**	**3**	**3**	–	
Arthur Owira	Back	KCB	–	7	1	1	1	1	1	–	–	
Nelson Oyoo	Forward	Nakuru	8	8	7	8	9	9	9	9	9	
Daniel Sikuta	Back	Kabras	2	2	2	2	2	2	2	2	–	
Brian Tanga	Forward	Kabras	10	10	11	11	–	–	–	–	10	
Frank Wanyama	Forward	SportPesa Quins	3	6	10	–	–	–	–	–	–	

== New Zealand ==
Coach: (New Zealand) Clark Laidlaw (Note: for the 2018 Hong Kong Sevens, Roger Randle takes his place)

New Zealand team members 2017–18
Player	Position	Affiliation	Number									
Player	Position	Affiliation	Dubai	Cape Town	Sydney	Hamilton	Las Vegas	Vancouver	Hong Kong	Singapore	London	Paris
Kurt Baker	Back	Manawatu	13	10	10	13	–	10	–	11	10	10
Jordan Bunce	Forward		–	–	–	–	–	–	11	–	–	–
Caleb Clarke	Back	Auckland	–	–	13	8	–	–	–	–	–	–
Dylan Collier	Forward	Waikato	5	5	–	–	5	5	5	5	5	5
Scott Curry	Forward	Bay of Plenty	**1**	**1**	**1**	**1**	**1**	**1**	–	–	**1**	**1**
Sam Dickson	Forward	Canterbury	7	7	7	7	7	7	–	–	7	7
Lotima Fainga'anuku	Back		–	–	–	–	–	–	13	–	–	–
Trael Joass	Forward	Tasman	–	–	–	–	3	3	–	3	–	–
Rocky Khan	Back		–	–	–	–	–	–	**6**	–	–	–
Andrew Knewstubb	Back	Tasman	8	8	8	–	8	8	–	8	–	–
Vilimoni Koroi	Back	Otago	6	6	6	6	6	–	–	–	–	–
Luke Masirewa	Forward		–	–	5	5	–	2	5	–	–	–
Ngarohi McGarvey-Black	Back	Bay of Plenty	–	–	–	–	11	6	–	10	–	–
Tim Mikkelson	Forward	Waikato	2	2	2	2	2	–	–	**2**	2	2
Sione Molia	Back	Counties Manukau	12	12	12	12	12	13	–	12	12	12
Etene Nanai-Seturo	Back		–	–	11	10	10	12	–	9	11	–
Jona Nareki	Back	Otago	–	–	–	–	–	–	8	13	8	8
Tone Ng Shiu	Forward		3	–	–	–	–	–	3	1	3	3
Amanaki Nicole	Forward		–	–	–	–	–	–	1	–	–	–
Joe Ravouvou	Back	Auckland	4	4	4	4	4	4	4	4	–	11
Salesi Rayasi	Back		–	–	–	–	–	–	2	–	4	4
Akuila Rokolosoa	Back		–	–	–	–	–	–	9	6	6	13
Daniel Schrijvers	Forward		–	–	–	–	–	–	7	–	–	–
Bailey Simonsson	Back		–	–	–	–	–	–	12	–	13	6
Teddy Stanaway	Forward		–	3	3	3	–	–	–	7	–	–
Isaac Te Tamaki	Back		10	13	–	–	–	–	10	–	–	–
Regan Ware	Back	Bay of Plenty	9	9	9	9	9	9	–	–	9	9
Joe Webber	Back		11	11	–	11	13	11	–	–	–	–

- Notes:

== Russia ==
Coach: (Russia) Andrey Sorokin

Russia team members 2017–18
Player	Position	Affiliation	Number									
Player	Position	Affiliation	Dubai	Cape Town	Sydney	Hamilton	Las Vegas	Vancouver	Hong Kong	Singapore	London	Paris
Aleksandr Afanasev	Back		–	–	1	1	13	4	–	–	–	–
Vladimir Aksenov	Forward		–	–	–	–	–	–	–	–	13	11
Kevin Akuabu	Forward		12	12	–	–	–	–	–	–	–	–
Ilya Babaev	Back		5	5	5	5	5	5	5	5	5	5
Sergey Bondarenko	Back		2	–	–	–	–	–	–	–	–	–
Stanislav Bondarev	Forward		–	2	13	–	–	–	–	–	–	–
German Davydov	Forward		–	–	–	–	12	**11**	**12**	**12**	**12**	**12**
Eduard Filatov	Back		7	7	–	–	–	–	–	–	–	–
Igor Galinovskiy	Forward		–	–	–	–	–	–	–	2	2	2
Ramil Gaisin	Back		–	–	–	–	–	–	–	–	8	8
Yury Gostyuzhev	Forward		10	10	10	10	10	–	10	10	10	10
Sergei Ianiushkin	Back		–	4	7	7	7	7	7	7	7	7
Alexey Kapalin	Back		3	3	3	3	–	–	–	–	–	–
Roman Khodin	Forward		–	–	12	12	1	1	–	–	–	–
Vladislav Lazarenko	Forward		4	–	**4**	**4**	**4**	13	4	4	4	4
Sergei Mysin	Forward		6	6	6	6	–	–	–	–	–	–
Aleksandr Nikitin	Forward		11	11	–	–	–	–	–	–	–	–
Vladimir Ostroushko	Back		**1**	**1**	–	–	–	–	1	1	1	1
Ivan Ovchinnikov	Back		13	8	2	2	2	2	9	9	9	9
Eme Patris Peki	Forward		–	–	–	–	–	–	2	–	–	–
Roman Roshchin	Back		9	9	9	9	–	–	–	–	–	–
Denis Simplikevich	Back		–	–	–	–	–	–	–	11	11	13
Artur Solomyannyy	Forward		–	–	11	11	11	10	11	13	–	–
Vladislav Sozonov	Back		–	–	–	–	3	3	3	3	3	3
Dmitry Sukhin	Back		8	–	8	8	8	8	8	8	–	–
Pavel Zhigailov	Back		–	–	–	–	9	9	13	–	–	–
Vitaly Zhivatov	Back		–	–	–	–	6	6	6	6	6	6

== Samoa ==
Coach: (New Zealand) Gordon Tietjens

Samoa team members 2017–18
Player	Position	Affiliation	Number									
Player	Position	Affiliation	Dubai	Cape Town	Sydney	Hamilton	Las Vegas	Vancouver	Hong Kong	Singapore	London	Paris
David Afamasaga	Forward		–	12	12	12	12	12	12	12	12	12
Jonathan Timo Ah-Sui	Back		–	–	–	–	–	–	–	3	13	13
Jacob Ale	Forward		3	3	–	4	4	4	3	–	–	–
Elisapeta Alofipo	Back		–	–	13	13	3	10	–	10	10	10
Tomasi Alosio	Back		8	8	8	–	8	8	8	8	8	8
Malu Falaniko	Back		–	–	–	–	–	–	–	–	7	7
Neria Fomai	Forward		–	–	5	5	5	5	5	5	5	5
Tom Iosefo	Back		13	2	10	10	10	–	10	–	–	–
Barren Kellett-Moore	Forward		4	4	4	–	–	–	–	–	–	–
Gordon Langkilde	Forward		1	–	1	1	1	1	–	–	–	–
Laaloi Leilua	Back		–	–	–	8	2	3	9	13	–	–
Vaa Apelu Maliko	Back		–	–	–	–	–	–	–	4	3	3
Tila Mealoi	Back		9	9	9	**9**	9	9	13	–	–	–
Alamanda Motuga	Forward		5	5	–	–	–	–	2	2	2	2
Della Neli	Forward		–	–	–	–	–	–	–	9	9	9
Silao Nonu	Forward		–	1	–	7	–	13	1	–	–	–
Fautua Otto	Back		12	13	–	–	–	–	–	–	–	–
Murphy Paulo	Back		6	6	6	6	6	6	6	6	–	–
Joe Perez	Back		11	11	11	11	11	11	–	–	11	11
Faalemiga Selesele	Forward		2	–	2	2	–	–	–	–	–	–
Tofatu Solia	Forward		–	–	3	3	13	2	–	1	1	1
Samoa Toloa	Back		10	10	–	–	–	–	–	–	–	–
Belgium Tuatagaloa	Back		–	–	–	–	–	–	11	11	**4**	**4**
Alatasi Tupou	Back		**7**	**7**	**7**	–	**7**	**7**	**7**	**7**	–	–
Danny Tusitala	Back		–	–	–	–	–	–	–	–	6	6
Lafaele Vaa	Back		–	–	–	–	–	–	4	–	–	–

== Scotland ==
Coach: (Scotland) John Dalziel

Scotland team members 2017–18
Player	Position	Affiliation	Number									
Player	Position	Affiliation	Dubai	Cape Town	Sydney	Hamilton	Las Vegas	Vancouver	Hong Kong	Singapore	London	Paris
Bobby Beattie	Back		–	–	–	–	–	–	–	–	4	4
Hugh Blake	Forward	(New Zealand) Bay of Plenty	3	3	3	3	–	–	–	–	–	–
Glenn Bryce	Back	Edinburgh	–	4	4	4	4	4	4	4	–	–
Alec Coombes	Back		–	–	9	9	9	9	–	–	–	–
Jack Cuthbert	Forward		12	12	12	12	–	–	–	–	12	12
Harvey Elms	Back		2	2	2	2	–	–	–	10	8	8
Matt Fagerson	Back	Glasgow Warriors	–	–	–	–	–	–	8	–	–	–
Jamie Farndale	Forward		7	7	7	7	7	7	7	7	7	7
Robbie Fergusson	Back		8	8	8	8	8	8	–	9	9	9
James Fleming	Forward		–	–	–	–	11	–	13	12	–	–
Nyle Godsmark	Forward		–	–	–	–	3	3	3	3	3	3
Darcy Graham	Back	Edinburgh	9	–	–	–	2	2	2	2	2	2
George Horne	Forward	Glasgow Warriors	–	–	–	–	–	–	5	–	–	–
Ruaridh Jackson	Back	Glasgow Warriors	–	–	–	–	–	–	9	–	–	–
Lee Jones	Back	Glasgow Warriors	–	–	–	–	–	–	12	–	–	–
Sean Kennedy	Back		–	–	5	5	–	–	–	–	–	–
Gavin Lowe	Back	Marr	10	10	10	10	10	10	10	–	10	–
Ross McCann	Back		4	13	13	13	–	–	–	–	–	–
Max McFarland	Back	Glasgow Warriors	11	11	11	11	12	12	11	11	11	11
Nick McLennan	Back		5	5	–	–	5	5	–	5	5	5
Ally Miller	Forward	Edinburgh	–	–	–	–	–	6	6	8	13	13
Joe Nayacavou	Forward		6	6	6	6	6	–	–	6	6	6
Sam Pecqueur	Back		13	9	–	–	–	–	–	–	–	–
Scott Riddell	Forward		**1**	**1**	**1**	**1**	**1**	**1**	**1**	**1**	**1**	**1**
Charlie Shiel	Back	Edinburgh	–	–	–	–	–	–	–	–	–	10
Kyle Steyn	Back		–	–	–	–	13	11	–	–	–	–

== South Africa ==
Coach: (South Africa) Neil Powell (Note: for the 2018 Hong Kong Sevens, Marius Schoeman takes his place)

South Africa team members 2017–18
Player	Position	Affiliation	Number									
Player	Position	Affiliation	Dubai	Cape Town	Sydney	Hamilton	Las Vegas	Vancouver	Hong Kong	Singapore	London	Paris
Cecil Afrika	Back	Free State Cheetahs	10	10	10	10	10	10	–	10	10	–
Tim Agaba	Forward	Bulls	3	3	1	1	–	–	–	–	–	–
Heino Bezuidenhout	Forward	Blue Bulls	–	–	–	–	–	–	1	2	6	6
Kyle Brown	Forward		6	6	6	**6**	6	6	–	6		–
Selvyn Davids	Back		–	–	–	–	9	9	7	9	–	–
Zain Davids	Forward		–	–	–	4	4	4	3	4	4	4
Chris Dry	Forward	Free State Cheetahs	1	1	–	–	–	–	–	–	–	–
Muller du Plessis	Back		–	–	–	–	8	5	11	7	–	–
Branco du Preez	Back	Golden Lions	7	7	–	7	7	7	–	–	7	–
Stedman Gans	Back	Blue Bulls	–	–	7	12	12	8	10	12	13	–
Justin Geduld	Back	Western Province	9	9	9	9	–	–	–	–	9	9
Dewald Human	Back		–	–	–	–	–	–	**8**	–	–	7
Werner Kok	Forward	Western Province	5	5	5	5	5	–	–	5	5	5
Marco Labuschagné	Forward		13	–	–	–	–	13	4	–	–	–
Mosolwa Mafuma	Back	Free State Cheetahs	–	–	–	–	–	–	5	–	–	–
James Murphy	Forward		–	–	–	–	–	–	6	13	–	–
Mfundo Ndhlovu	Back		–	–	–	–	–	–	12	–	–	10
Ruhan Nel	Back	Western Province	12	12	12	–	13	12	–	–	12	12
Sandile Ngcobo	Back		–	–	–	–	–	–	13	–	–	–
Sikhumbuzo Notshe	Forward	Stormers	–	–	13	2	–	–	–	–	–	–
Ryan Oosthuizen	Forward	Western Province	–	–	–	–	1	1	2	1	1	1
Dylan Sage	Forward		–	–	3	3	3	3	–	3	3	3
Seabelo Senatla	Back	Stormers	11	11	11	11	–	–	–	–	11	11
Kwagga Smith	Forward	Lions	4	4	4	13	–	–	–	–	–	–
Rhyno Smith	Back	Sharks	–	–	–	–	–	–	9	–	–	13
Philip Snyman	Forward		**2**	**2**	**2**	–	**2**	**2**	–	–	**2**	**2**
Siviwe Soyizwapi	Back		–	13	–	–	11	11	–	11	8	8
Rosko Specman	Back	Free State Cheetahs	8	8	8	8	–	–	–	8	–	–

- Notes:

== Spain ==
Coach: (Spain) Pablo Feijoo

Spain team members 2017–18
Player	Position	Affiliation	Number									
Player	Position	Affiliation	Dubai	Cape Town	Sydney	Hamilton	Las Vegas	Vancouver	Hong Kong	Singapore	London	Paris
Alejandro Alonso	Back		12	12	12	12	12	12	–	–	12	12
Javier Carrión	Back		11	11	–	–	–	–	11	11	–	–
Jaike Carter	Forward		2	2	2	2	2	2	2	2	2	2
Javier de Juan	Forward		10	10	10	11	13	13	–	12	11	11
Pablo Fontes	Back		4	4	4	4	4	4	4	4	–	4
Igor Genua	Back		**9**	**9**	**9**	**9**	**9**	**9**	**9**	**9**	**9**	–
Francisco Hernández	Back		6	6	6	6	6	6	6	6	6	**6**
Lucas Levy	Back		–	–	13	1	–	–	–	–	–	8
Ignacio Martín	Forward		3	3	3	3	–	–	3	3	3	3
Jacobo Martín	Back		8	13	8	8	8	8	12	–	–	–
Iñaki Mateu			–	–	–	–	–	–	–	–	–	13
Thomas Pearce	Forward		1	1	1	13	1	1	1	13	1	1
Pol Pla	Back		7	7	7	7	7	7	7	7	7	7
Marcos Poggi	Back		–	8	–	–	–	–	8	8	8	–
Juan Ramos	Back		–	–	–	–	–	–	–	–	4	–
Ignacio Rodriguez-Guerra	Back		–	–	–	–	11	11	13	1	13	9
Manuel Sainz-Trapaga	Forward		5	5	5	5	5	5	5	5	5	5
Josh Taylor	Forward		–	–	–	–	3	3	–	–	–	–
Iñaki Villanueva	Forward		–	–	11	10	10	10	10	10	10	10

== United States ==
Coach: (England) Mike Friday

United States team members 2017–18
Player	Position	Affiliation	Apps	Number									
Player	Position	Affiliation	Apps	Dubai	Cape Town	Sydney	Hamilton	Las Vegas	Vancouver	Hong Kong	Singapore	London	Paris
Malon Al-Jiboori	Forward	San Diego Legion	8	6	6	–	–	6	6	13	6	6	6
Perry Baker	Back		7	11	–	11	11	11	11	11	11	–	–
Danny Barrett	Forward		10	3	3	3	3	3	3	3	3	3	3
Nick Boyer	Forward	Glendale Merlins	2	–	–	–	9	–	5	–	–	–	–
Naima Fuala'au	Back		2	13	13	–	–	–	–	–	–	–	–
Madison Hughes	Back		5	**10**	**10**	**10**	–	–	–	–	–	**10**	**10**
Martin Iosefo	Back	Denver Barbarians	10	12	12	12	12	12	12	12	12	12	12
Carlin Isles	Back		10	1	1	1	1	1	1	1	1	1	1
Matai Leuta	Forward		9	4	4	4	4	4	4	4	4	4	–
Chris Mattina	Back		8	–	–	6	6	13	13	6	8	8	8
Cody Melphy	Forward		3	–	–	–	–	9	9	–	7	–	
Folau Niua	Back		9	7	7	7	7	7	7	7	–	7	7
Ben Pinkelman	Forward	Denver Barbarians	9	2	2	2	**2**	**2**	**2**	**2**	**2**	2	2
Joe Schroeder	Forward		5	5	5	5	5	5	–	–	–	–	
Alex Schwarz	Forward		1	–	–	–	–	–	–	–	–	–	4
Faitala Talapusi			3	–	–	–	–	–	–	–	13	13	13
Brett Thompson	Back		4	–	–	–	–	–	–	5	5	5	5
Stephen Tomasin	Forward		7	9	9	9	–	–	–	9	9	9	9
Maka Unufe	Back		7	8	8	8	8	8	8	8	–	–	–
Kevon Williams	Back	Denver Barbarians	9	–	11	13	10	10	10	10	10	11	11

== Wales ==
Coach: (Wales) Gareth Williams

Wales team members 2017–18
Player	Position	Affiliation	Number									
Player	Position	Affiliation	Dubai	Cape Town	Sydney	Hamilton	Las Vegas	Vancouver	Hong Kong	Singapore	London	Paris
Afon Bagshaw	Forward		–	–	–	–	6	6	9	–	2	2
Ethan Davies	Back		7	7	–	–	–	–	7	7	–	–
Cai Devine	Forward		10	13	–	–	8	10	10	10	10	10
Lloyd Evans	Forward		13	8	–	–	–	13	8	–	13	3
Jacob Flynn	Back		–	–	–	–	1	1	3	34	–	–
George Gasson	Back	Dragons	12	–	–	–	–	–	–	–	–	–
Jason Harries	Back		–	–	–	–	–	–	–	–	7	7
Joe Jenkins	Forward		8	10	10	7	10	8	12	11	12	13
Owen Jenkins	Forward		5	5	5	5	5	–	–	5	5	5
Phil Jones	Back		3	3	3	3	–	–	13	–	–	–
Cameron Lewis	Forward		6	6	6	6	–	–	–	–	–	–
Lloyd Lewis	Back		–	–	12	11	–	–	–	–	–	–
Tomi Lewis	Back		2	2	–	–	–	–	4	–	–	–
Jack Maynard	Back		–	–	–	–	13	5	–	–	–	–
Billy McBryde	Back	Scarlets	–	–	7	–	–	–	–	–	–	–
Hari Millard	Forward		–	–	8	8	3	3	5	–	–	–
Luke Morgan	Back		4	4	4	4	4	4	–	4	4	4
Angus O'Brien	Back	Dragons	–	–	–	–	7	7	–	–	–	–
Ben Roach	Forward		–	–	13	12	12	12	–	12	–	12
Jared Rosser	Back	Dragons	–	–	–	–	–	–	–	–	11	11
Chay Smith	Forward		–	–	–	13	–	11	–	–	–	–
Daffyd Smith	Back		–	–	–	–	–	–	11	8	–	–
Will Talbot-Davies	Back		11	11	11	10	11	–	–	–	8	8
Adam Thomas	Forward		9	9	9	9	**9**	**9**	–	**9**	**9**	**9**
Luke Treharne	Back		**1**	**1**	**1**	**1**	–	–	**1**	1	1	1
Lloyd Williams	Back	Cardiff Blues	–	–	–	–	–	–	–	–	3	–
Morgan Williams	Back		–	12	2	2	–	–	2	2	–	–
Tom Glyn Williams	Back		–	–	–	–	–	–	6	6	6	6
Mike Wilson	Back		–	–	–	–	2	2	–	–	–	–

== Non-core teams ==
One place in each tournament of the series is allocated to a national team based on performance in the respective continental tournaments within Africa, Asia, Europe, Oceania, and the Americas.

=== Ireland ===
Coach: (Australia) Anthony Eddy

Ireland team members 2017–18
Player	Position	Affiliation	Number	
Player	Position	Affiliation	London	Paris
Robert Baloucoune	Back	Ulster	12	–
Jordan Conroy	Back	Connacht	11	12
Sean Cribbin	Back		–	11
Shane Daly	Forward		–	5
Billy Dardis	Back	UCD	**6**	**6**
Ian Fitzpatrick	Forward	Leinster	2	–
Foster Horan	Forward	Lansdowne	5	–
Hugo Keenan	Back	Leinster	8	–
Terry Kennedy	Back	Leinster	10	10
Adam Leavy			–	3
Alex McHenry	Forward		–	8
Harry McNulty	Forward	UCD	1	1
Bryan Mollen	Forward	Dublin Univ.	4	2
Jimmy O'Brien	Back	Leinster	9	9
John O'Donnell	Forward	Lansdowne	3	–
James O'Donovan			–	4
Greg O'Shea	Back	Shannon	–	7
Mark Roche	Back	Lansdowne	7	13

=== Japan ===
Coach: (New Zealand) Damian Karauna

Japan team members 2017–18
Player	Position	Affiliation	Number
Player	Position	Affiliation	Singapore
Taisei Hayashi	Forward		10
Joseph Kamana	Back		5
Makoto Kato			13
Taiki Koyama	Back	Panasonic Wild Knights	9
Naoki Motomura	Back	Honda Heat	12
Masahiro Nakano	Back		4
Yoshihiro Noguchi	Back		11
Rikiya Oishi	Forward	NEC Green Rockets	3
Dai Ozawa	Forward	Toyota Verblitz	**6**
Katsuyuki Sakai	Back	Toyota Industries	7
Tevita Tupou	Forward	Panasonic Wild Knights	1
Ryuta Yasui	Forward	Kobelco Steelers	2
Taichi Yoshizawa	Back	Coca-Cola Red Sparks	8

=== Papua New Guinea ===
Coach: (Papua New Guinea) Douglas Guise

Papua New Guinea team members 2017–18
Player	Position	Affiliation	Number	
Player	Position	Affiliation	Sydney	Hamilton
Himah Alu	Forward		2	2
Isaac Aquilla	Forward		10	8
Arthur Clement	Back		4	–
Emmanuel Guise	Back		5	5
Henry Kalua	Forward		**8**	–
Gairo Kapana	Back		12	12
Samuel Malambes	Back		3	3
Dean Manale	Forward		–	10
Freddy Rova	Back		11	11
Willy Shalandra	Back		7	7
Patrick Tatut	Forward		9	9
William Tirang	Back		6	6
Eugene Tokavai	Forward		1	**1**
Wesley Vali	Back		–	4

=== South Korea ===
Coach: (South Korea) Chang Ryul Choi

South Korea team members 2017–18
Player	Position	Affiliation	Number
Player	Position	Affiliation	Hong Kong
Han Kunkyu	Forward		1
Hwang Injo	Forward		3
Jang Jeongmin	Back		7
Kang Jingu	Back		11
Kim Hyunsoo	Back		6
Kim Jeongmin	Forward		2
Kim Namuk	Back		5
Lee Yongseung	Forward		9
Lee Jaebok	Back		**4**
Lee Jinkyu	Forward		10
Lim Junhui	Back		8
Park Hangyul	Back		12

=== Uganda ===
Coach: (Kenya) Tolbert Onyango

Uganda team members 2017–18
Player	Position	Affiliation	Number	
Player	Position	Affiliation	Dubai	Cape Town
Joseph Aredo	Back		9	9
Desire Ayera	Forward		8	–
James Ijongat	Back		11	11
Eric Kasiita	Forward		**1**	**1**
Adrian Kasito	Forward		–	8
Kevin Kermundu	Back		4	4
Achaji Manano	Back		–	3
Timothy Mudoola	Forward		7	7
James Odongo	Back		3	–
Aaron Ofoyrwoth	Back		12	12
Pius Ogena	Forward		2	2
Solomon Okia	Forward		10	10
Michael Okorach	Back		6	6
Lawrence Ssebuliba	Back		–	5
Philip Wokorach	Back		5	–

=== Uruguay ===
Coach: (Uruguay) Luis Pedro Achard

Uruguay team members 2017–18
Player	Position	Affiliation	Number	
Player	Position	Affiliation	Las Vegas	Vancouver
Joaquín Alonso	Back	Old Boys	8	
Diego Ardao	Back	Old Christians	6	
Manuel Ardao	Forward	Old Christians	2	
Francisco Berchesi	Back	Carrasco Polo	7	
Santiago Civetta	Forward	Old Boys	9	
Augustín Della Corte	Forward	Trébol	11	
Felipe Etcheverry	Back	Carrasco Polo	5	
Tomás Etcheverry	Back	Carrasco Polo	12	
Guillermo Lijtenstein	Forward	Trébol	4	
Eugenio Plottier	Back	Old Boys	10	
Gabriel Puig	Back	Old Boys	**1**	
Gonzalo Soto Mera	Forward	Carrasco Polo	3	

== See also ==
- 2017–18 World Rugby Women's Sevens Series squads
