= Eroni Sau =

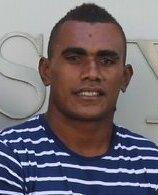
- Born: 5 February 1990 (age 36) Nabukeru, Yasawa
- Height: 1.85 m (6 ft 1 in)
- Weight: 93 kg (205 lb)

Rugby union career
- Position: Wing
- Current team: Fijian Drua
Senior career
Years	Team	Apps	(Points)
2018–2019	USA Perpignan	14	(10)
2019–2021	Edinburgh Rugby	27	(25)
2021–2023	Provence Rugby	26	(25)
2023–	Fijian Drua	3	(5)
International career
Years	Team	Apps	(Points)
2018–	Fiji	5	(15)
National sevens team
Years	Team		Comps
2017–	Fiji 7s		11
Medal record
Men's rugby sevens
Representing Fiji
World Rugby Sevens Series
Gold medal – first place	2018 Hamilton 7s	Team
Bronze medal – third place	2018 Las Vegas 7s	Team
Gold medal – first place	2018 Vancouver 7s	Team
Gold medal – first place	2018 Hong Kong 7s	Team
Gold medal – first place	2018 Singapore 7s	Team
Gold medal – first place	2018 London 7s	Team
Silver medal – second place	2017–18 World Rugby 7s Series	Team
Commonwealth Games
Silver medal – second place	2018 Gold Coast	Team

Eroni Sau (born 5 February 1990), nicknamed "The Sledgehammer", is a Fijian rugby union player currently playing for the Fijian Drua in Super Rugby

== Early life and career ==
Sau hails from the village of Nabukeru Yasawa and attended Yasawa High School before he moved to Lautoka to finish his Year 13 at Ba Provincial Freebird Institute where he was introduced to play Rugby league, He joined Saru Dragons and was given a contract to play in the Cook Islands.

Later he met Lagilagi Golea (FNRL development officer), who urged him to join a 7s team and contacted Red Rock Rugby Club coach, the late Lote Rasiga. Sau joined the team in Qauai and even toured with the team to Australia.

In 2014 he was recruited as a special constable at Totogo Police Station in Suva and joined the Fiji Police Rugby Team.

== Fiji national team ==
Sau made a name for himself playing local 7's tournaments and was selected by Fiji Drua Head Coach Senirusi Seruvakula to represent Fiji Drua Team at 2017 National Rugby Championship. later he caught the attention of Fiji National Sevens Team Head Coach Gareth Baber and was drafted into the Fiji National Sevens Team. so far he has scored a total of 185 points (37 tries) in 58 matches for his Fiji National Sevens Team.

He was named 2017–18 World Rugby Sevens Series Rookie of the season and also named in the Overall Dream Team of the Season and won the Impact player for 2018 Hong Kong Sevens, and also has won 5 gold and a bronze in 2017–18 World Rugby Sevens Series, He won 2 silver medals for Fiji National Sevens Team, one at 2018 commonwealth games and one as the overall runner up of 2017–18 World Rugby Sevens Series.

On 29 May 2018, Sau signed a two-year deal with French club USA Perpignan.

== Statistics ==
=== World Rugby Sevens Series ===
Season	Statistics		Final ranking	Tournaments played	(gold) Victory	(silver) Runners-up	(bronze) Third places
Season	Matches	Tries	Final ranking	Tournaments played	(gold) Victory	(silver) Runners-up	(bronze) Third places
2017–18	58	37	2nd	10/10	5 (New Zealand) Hamilton (Canada) Vancouver; Hong Kong; Singapore (England) London	0	1 (United States) Las Vegas
Total	58	37	-	10	5	0	1

=== 2018 Commonwealth Games ===
Statistics		Final ranking
Matches	Tries	Final ranking
5	2	2nd

== Awards and honours ==
- 2018 Hong Kong Sevens Impact Player of the Tournament
- 5 * Dream Team: 2018 New Zealand Sevens, 2018 Canada Sevens, 2018 Hong Kong Sevens & 2018 Singapore Sevens & Overall 2017–18 World Rugby Sevens Series Dream team of the season.
- 5 Gold Medal: 2018 New Zealand Sevens, 2018 Canada Sevens, 2018 Hong Kong Sevens, 2018 Singapore Sevens & 2018 London Sevens
- 2 Silver Medal: 2018 Commonwealth Games & 2017–18 World Rugby Sevens Series Runner up
- 1 Bronze Medal: 2018 Las Vegas Sevens.
- 2017–18 World Rugby Sevens Series Rookie of the season (Winner)
- 2017–18 World Rugby Sevens Series DHL Impact Player of the Year (Nominated)
