= Joseph Aredo =

- Born: Joseph Aredo; November 4, 1992 (age 34) Tororo, Uganda
- School: Shimoni Demonstration School, Namiryango College
- University: Makerere University
- Occupation: Rugby player

Rugby union career
- Position: 15s / 7s Rugby
- Current team: Betway Kobs RFC
Senior career
Years	Team	Apps	(Points)
2011–2017	Kobs RFC		
- Kenya Harlequins
- Betway Kobs RFC
International career
Years	Team	Apps	(Points)
2011–2013	Uganda U-19		
2013–present	Uganda		

Joseph Aredo is a Ugandan rugby player known for his contributions to both clubs and national teams, including appearances in Uganda's national 15s and 7s squads. His career spans from school-level competitions to professional and international engagements. He was a former player for Kenya Harlequins but currently plays under Betway Kobs.

== Early life and education ==
Born on November 4, 1992, Aredo hails from Tororo, a town located roughly 230 kilometers from Kampala, Uganda's capital. He is the youngest child of Patrick Mileke and Debora Sipona, and was raised alongside his brothers Gabriel and Erasmus Aredo.

He attended Shimoni Demonstration School for his primary education, and was later enrolled at Namiryango college for both O-Level and A-Level studies. It was during this time at Namiryango that he began playing rugby. Aredo managed to balance academics with sports and went on to join Makerere University, where he obtained a bachelor's degree in Information Technology.

== Career ==
Aredo's rugby career began in earnest 2009 while he was at Namiryango College. In 2011, he joined Kobs Rugby Club, where he played until 2017. That same year, he was selected for the Uganda Under-19 national team and was also being considered for national 7s squad.

In 2012, he played a significant part in Kob's victory over Heathens during the Uganda Cup. The following year, in 2013, he received a call-up to the national 15s side and made his debut against Kenya in the Elgon Cup. Uganda secured a 19–13 win in that match, which was held at Kyandodo.

Over the years, Aredo has participated in both 15s and 7s rugby formats, representing Uganda in multiple competitions.

== Achievements and honors ==
Throughout his playing career, Joseph has contributed to teams that earned several titles:

- Uganda Rugby League Champion (2012)
- Uganda Cup Winner (2011,2012)
- Lions Cup Winner (2012, 2014)
- Competitor in the National 7s series (2015)

Earlier in his playing days, Aredo featured in the Namiryango College side that was defeated by King's College Budo in the 2010 Schools Rugby League final.
