= 2018 Sydney Sevens =

- Sevens World Series XIX
- Host nation: Australia
- Date: 26–28 January 2018

Cup
- Champion: Australia
- Runner-up: South Africa
- Third: Argentina

Challenge Cup
- Winner: France

Tournament details
- Matches played: 45
- Tries scored: 252 (average 5.6 per match)
- Most points: (South Africa) Justin Geduld (56)
- Most tries: (United States) Perry Baker (9)

The 2018 Sydney Sevens was the third tournament within the 2017–18 World Rugby Sevens Series and the fifteenth edition of the Australia Sevens, of which the third to be held in Sydney. It was held over the weekend of 26–28 January 2018 at Allianz Stadium in Sydney, Australia.

== Format ==
The teams were drawn into four pools of four teams each, with each team playing every other team in their pool once. The top two teams from each pool advanced to the Cup/5th place brackets. The bottom two teams from each group went to the Challenge trophy/13th place brackets.

== Teams ==
Fifteen core teams are participating in the tournament along with one invited team, the highest-placing non-core team of the 2017 Oceania Sevens Championship, Papua New Guinea:

- Argentina
- Australia
- Canada
- England
- Fiji
- France
- Kenya
- New Zealand
- Papua New Guinea
- Russia
- Samoa
- Scotland
- South Africa
- Spain
- United States
- Wales

== Pool stage ==
All times in Australian Eastern Daylight Time (UTC+11:00)

=== Pool A ===
Team	Pld	W	D	L	PF	PA	PD	Pts
Fiji	3	3	0	0	74	22	+52	9
New Zealand	3	2	0	1	109	19	+90	7
Samoa	3	1	0	2	31	74	–43	5
Russia	3	0	0	3	12	111	–99	3

26 January 2018	Fiji	31–5	Samoa	Allianz Stadium, Sydney
19:28	Try: Nasilasila 1'; Kunavula 7'; Vakurunabili 10'; Sau 11'; Naduva 12'; Con: Nasilasila (1/1) 1', 7'; Nacuqu (1/3) 11'		Try: Langkilde 4'; Con: Tupou (0/1)	Referee: (New Zealand) James Doleman

26 January 2018	New Zealand	61–0	Russia	Allianz Stadium, Sydney
19:50	Try: Ravouvou 2', 5'; Dickson 4', 13'; Ware 6'; Curry 8'; Knewstubb 10'; Nanai-Seturo 12'; Molia; Con: Koroi (3/4) 3', 4', 7'; Knewstubb (5/5) 8', 10', 12', 13', 14'			Referee: (Australia) Jordan Way

27 January 2018	Fiji	24–0	Russia	Allianz Stadium, Sydney
16:09	Try: Nasilasila 5'; Sau 7'; Vakurunabili 11'; Tuwai 14'; Con: Nasilasila (2/2) 5', 7'; Veremalua (0/1); Nacaqu (0/1)			Referee: (Australia) Damon Murphy

27 January 2018	New Zealand	31–0	Samoa	Allianz Stadium, Sydney
16:31	Try: Dickson 2', 11'; Ravouvou 5'; Baker 8'; Nanai-Seturo 14'; Con: Koroi (1/1) 3'; Knewstubb (2/3) 9', 14'; Baker (0/1); Cards: Koroi (yellow card) 8' to 10'			Referee: (South Africa) Rasta Rasivhenge

27 January 2018	Samoa	26–12	Russia	Allianz Stadium, Sydney
19:20	Try: Alosio 2'; Perez 4'; Afamasaga 8'; Iosefo 12'; Con: Paulo (2/3) 2', 4'; Tupou 12'		Try: Kapalin 7'; Solomyannyy 14'; Con: Roshchin 14'; Ianiushkin (0/1)	Referee: (Scotland) Sam Grove-White

27 January 2018	New Zealand	17–19	Fiji	Allianz Stadium, Sydney
19:42	Try: Knewstubb 1'; Ware 6'; Masirewa 10'; Con: Knewstubb (1/3) 7'		Try: Nasilasila 2', 4'; Vakurunabili 14'; Con: Nasilasila (2/2) 3', 4'; Nacuqu (0/1)	Referee: (Wales) Craig Evans

=== Pool B ===
Team	Pld	W	D	L	PF	PA	PD	Pts
Argentina	3	3	0	0	54	38	+16	9
Kenya	3	2	0	1	48	33	+15	7
France	3	1	0	2	57	48	+9	5
Wales	3	0	0	3	45	85	–40	3

26 January 2018	France	31–12	Wales	Allianz Stadium, Sydney
18:44	Try: Veredamu 1', 6', 14'; Dall'igna 3'; Barraque 4'; Con: Barraque (2/3) 3', 6'; Riva (1/1) 5'; Popelin (0/1)		Try: Morgan 9', 11'; Con: McBryde (1/2) 9'	Referee: (South Africa) Rasta Rasivhenge

26 January 2018	Argentina	7–5	Kenya	Allianz Stadium, Sydney
19:06	Try: Revol 4'; Con: Revol (1/1) 5'		Try: Amonde 9'; Con: Agero (0/1)	Referee: (New Zealand) Richard Kelly

27 January 2018	France	14–17	Kenya	Allianz Stadium, Sydney
15:25	Try: Barraque 6'; Riva 7'; Con: Barraque (2/2) 6', 7'		Try: Ambaka 1'; Ouma 8'; Sikuta 14'; Con: Agero (1/1) 8'; Oliech (0/1); Tanga (0/1)	Referee: (Australia) Jordan Way

27 January 2018	Argentina	28–21	Wales	Allianz Stadium, Sydney
15:47	Try: Luna 1'; Sabato 2', 10'; Moroni 8'; Con: Revol (4/4) 1', 3', 8', 10'; Cards: Sabato (yellow card) 4' to 6'		Try: Jenkins 5'; Morgan 6', 12'; Con: Jones (3/3) 5', 7', 13'; Cards: Jenkins (yellow card) 7' to 9'	Referee: (Fiji) Tevita Rokovereni

27 January 2018	Wales	12–26	Kenya	Allianz Stadium, Sydney
18:36	Try: Lewis 1'; Jenkins 12'; Con: Jones (1/1) 1'; Treharne (0/1)		Try: Ambaka 2'; Sikuta 4'; Agero 6'; Ochieng 10'; Con: Agero (2/3) 2', 6'; Oliech (1/1) 10'	Referee: (Australia) Damon Murphy

27 January 2018	Argentina	19–12	France	Allianz Stadium, Sydney
18:58	Try: Sabato 1', 10'; Osadczuk 13'; Con: Revol (2/3) 2', 13'		Try: Dall'igna 3'; Valleau 4'; Con: Barraque (1/2) 3'	Referee: (South Africa) Craig Joubert

=== Pool C ===
Team	Pld	W	D	L	PF	PA	PD	Pts
South Africa	3	3	0	0	121	12	+109	9
England	3	2	0	1	69	48	+21	7
Papua New Guinea	3	1	0	2	26	102	–76	5
Spain	3	0	0	3	27	81	–54	3

26 January 2018	England	22–10	Spain	Allianz Stadium, Sydney
18:00	Try: Davis 1', 3'; Mitchell 5'; McConnochie 8'; Con: Mitchell (1/4) 5'		Try: Fontes 7'; J Martin 13'; Con: Genua (0/1); I Martin (0/1)	Referee: (Fiji) Tevita Rokovereni

26 January 2018	South Africa	50–0	Papua New Guinea	Allianz Stadium, Sydney
18:22	Try: Specman 2', 8', 11'; Nel 3', 7'; Senatla 8'; Gans 10'; Afrika 14'; Con: Geduld (4/6) 2', 4', 7', 11'; Afrika (1/2) 14'			Referee: (Hong Kong) Matt Rodden

27 January 2018	England	35–5	Papua New Guinea	Allianz Stadium, Sydney
14:41	Try: Mitchell 2', 10'; Bibby 3' de Carpentier 7'; Norton 8'; Con: Mitchell (5/5) 2', 4', 7', 8', 11'; Cards: Lindsay-Hague (yellow card) 13' to 14'		Try: Guise 14'; Con: Tokavai (0/1); Cards: Tokavai (yellow card) 1' to 3'	Referee: (South Africa) Craig Joubert

27 January 2018	South Africa	38–0	Spain	Allianz Stadium, Sydney
15:03	Try: Specman 1', 4'; Nel 9'; Geduld 11'; Senatla 12'; Sage 14'; Con: Geduld (4/6) 2', 4', 11', 12'			Referee: (Wales) Craig Evans

27 January 2018	Spain	17–21	Papua New Guinea	Allianz Stadium, Sydney
17:52	Try: Sainz-Trapaga 2', 4'; J Martin 10'; Con: Hernandez (1/3) 2'; Cards: Hernandez (yellow card) 13' to 14'		Try: Kapana 6'; Tirang 12', 14'; Con: Guise (3/3) 7', 12', 14'	Referee: (New Zealand) James Doleman

27 January 2018	South Africa	33–12	England	Allianz Stadium, Sydney
18:14	Try: Senatla 2', 13'; Afrika 4'; Geduld 7', 8'; Con: Geduld (4/5) 3', 5', 7', 8'		Try: Lindsay-Hague 1'; Bibby 11'; Con: Bibby (1/1) 1'; Mitchell (0/1)	Referee: (Scotland) Sam Grove-White

=== Pool D ===
Team	Pld	W	D	L	PF	PA	PD	Pts
Australia	3	3	0	0	77	45	+32	9
United States	3	2	0	1	85	57	+28	7
Scotland	3	1	0	2	85	55	+30	5
Canada	3	0	0	3	27	119	–92	3

26 January 2018	United States	19–26	Australia	Allianz Stadium, Sydney
20:12	Try: Baker 8'; Iosefo 8'; Pinkleman 10'; Con: Hughes (2/3) 8', 9'; Cards: Iosefo (yellow card) 3' to 5'		Try: Killingworth 1'; O'Donnell 4'; Porch 5'; Anstee 12'; Con: Stannard (3/4) 1', 4', 13'	Referee: (Scotland) Sam Grove-White

26 January 2018	Canada	5–52	Scotland	Allianz Stadium, Sydney
20:36	Try: Hirayama 5'; Con: Hirayama (0/1); Cards: Moonlight (yellow card) 8' to 10'		Try: Farndale 1'; McFarland 3', 9', 11'; Lowe 7'; Bryce 8'; Coombes 13'; Kennedy 14'; Con: Lowe (5/6) 1', 3', 7', 9', 11'; Fergusson (1/2) 14'	Referee: (Australia) Damon Murphy

27 January 2018	United States	26–12	Scotland	Allianz Stadium, Sydney
16:53	Try: Baker 3', 6'; Barrett 4'; Tomasin 5'; Con: Tomasin (3/4) 3', 4', 7'		Try: Riddell 10'; Fergusson 14'; Con: Lowe (1/1) 10'; Elms (0/1); Cards: Farndale (yellow card) 14' to 14'	Referee: (Hong Kong) Matthew Rodden

27 January 2018	Canada	5–27	Australia	Allianz Stadium, Sydney
17:15	Try: Douglas 1'; Con: Hirayama (0/1)		Try: Holland 3', 5'; Anstee 9'; Porch 10'; Stannard 12'; Con: Stannard (1/5) 9'	Referee: (New Zealand) Richard Kelly

27 January 2018	Australia	24–21	Scotland	Allianz Stadium, Sydney
20:04	Try: Parahi 1'; Anderson 2'; Porch 6'; Lucas 13'; Con: Stannard (1/3) 1'; Lucas (1/1) 13'; Cards: Connor (yellow card) 14' to 14'		Try: Farndale 4'; Riddell 8'; McFarland 11'; Con: Lowe (1/1) 4'; Fergusson (2/2) 8', 11'	Referee: (New Zealand) James Doleman

27 January 2018	Canada	19–40	United States	Allianz Stadium, Sydney
20:26	Try: Jones 7'; Moonlight 11'; Thiel 14'; Con: Hirayama (2/3) 7', 14'		Try: Baker 1', 1', 5', 8'; Pinkleman 2', 9'; Con: Tomasin (5/6) 1', 2', 3', 5', 10'	Referee: (Australia) Jordan Way

== Knockout stage ==
=== 13th place ===
Semi-finals
28 January 2018 – 15:24 – Allianz Stadium, Sydney
Canada	31
Papua New Guinea	14
28 January 2018 – 15:46 – Allianz Stadium, Sydney
Scotland	21
Spain	14

13th Place Final
28 January 2018 – 18:40 – Allianz Stadium, Sydney
Canada	14
Scotland	12

Matches

Semi-finals

28 January 2018	Canada	31–14	Papua New Guinea	Allianz Stadium, Sydney
15:24	Try: Jones 2'; Douglas 4'; Hirayama 10'; Kaay 12'; Moonlight 13'; Con: Hirayama (3/5) 5', 11', 12'		Try: Kapana 6'; Tirang 9'; Con: Guise (2/2) 6', 9'; Cards: Malambes (yellow card) 1' to 3'	Referee: (Australia) Jordan Way

28 January 2018	Scotland	21–14	Spain	Allianz Stadium, Sydney
15:46	Try: Kennedy 6'; McFarland 9'; Bryce 12'; Con: Kennedy (3/3) 7', 10', 12'		Try: Alonso 1'; Fontes 8'; Con: Hernandez (2/2) 2', 8'	Referee: (South Africa) Craig Joubert

13th Place Final

28 January 2018	Canada	14–12	Scotland	Allianz Stadium, Sydney
18:40	Try: Jones 7'; Hirayama 9'; Con: Hirayama (1/1) 7', 10'		Try: Elms 6'; McFarland 14'; Con: Kennedy (1/2) 14'; Cards: Farndale (yellow card) 7' to 9'	Referee: (South Africa) Rasta Rasivhenge

=== Challenge Trophy ===
Quarter-finals
28 January 2018 – 10:00 – Allianz Stadium, Sydney
Samoa	14
Canada	7
28 January 2018 – 10:22 – Allianz Stadium, Sydney
Papua New Guinea	5
Wales	24
28 January 2018 – 10:44 – Allianz Stadium, Sydney
Scotland	12
Russia	17
28 January 2018 – 11:06 – Allianz Stadium, Sydney
France	21
Spain	7

Semi-finals
28 January 2018 – 16:08 – Allianz Stadium, Sydney
Samoa	12
Wales	17
28 January 2018 – 16:30 – Allianz Stadium, Sydney
Russia	0
France	22

Challenge Trophy Final
28 January 2018 – 19:02 – Allianz Stadium, Sydney
Wales	12
France	29

Matches

Quarter-finals

28 January 2018	Samoa	14–7	Canada	Allianz Stadium, Sydney
10:00	Try: Mealoi 3'; Perez 6'; Con: Mealoi (2/2) 4', 6'; Cards: Iosefo (yellow card) 5' to 7'		Try: Hirayama 12'; Con: Hirayama (1/1) 12'	Referee: (Fiji) Tevita Rokovereni

28 January 2018	Papua New Guinea	5–24	Wales	Allianz Stadium, Sydney
10:22	Try: Tirang 11'; Con: Guise (0/1); Cards: Kapana (yellow card) 3' to 5'		Try: Talbot-Davies 1'; Jenkins 7'; Morgan 8'; Lewis 14'; Con: Treharne (2/4) 7', 8'	Referee: (Hong Kong) Matthew Rodden

28 January 2018	Scotland	12–17	Russia	Allianz Stadium, Sydney
10:44	Try: Kennedy 4'; McFarland 9'; Con: Fergusson (1/1) 4'; Kennedy (0/1)		Try: Sukhin 1'; Babaev 5'; Gostyuzhev 7'; Con: Ianiushkin (1/1) 7'; Gostyuzhev (0/2)	Referee: (Wales) Craig Evans

28 January 2018	France	21–7	Spain	Allianz Stadium, Sydney
11:06	Try: Barry 1'; Barraque 7'; Valleau 14'; Con: Barraque (2/2) 2', 7'; Parez 14'		Try: I Martin 11'; Con: Hernandez (1/1) 11'	Referee: (Australia) Damon Murphy

Semi-finals

28 January 2018	Samoa	12–17	Wales	Allianz Stadium, Sydney
16:08	Try: Fomai 1'; Alofipo 5'; Con: Mealoi (1/2) 6'		Try: Morgan 4'; Roach 8', 14'; Con: Treharne (1/3) 5'	Referee: (South Africa) Rasta Rasivhenge

28 January 2018	Russia	0–22	France	Allianz Stadium, Sydney
16:30			Try: Barry 1', 11'; Barraque 9'; Veredamu 12'; Con: Barraque (1/4) 12'	Referee: (New Zealand) James Doleman

Challenge Trophy Final

28 January 2018	Wales	12–29	France	Allianz Stadium, Sydney
19:02	Try: Morgan 4'; Teharne 7'; Con: Treharne (1/2) 5'; Cards: Jenkins (yellow card) 8' to 10'		Try: Veredamu 1', 2'; Barry 8', 12'; Barraque 10'; Con: Barraque (2/4) 3', 10'; Bonnefond (0/1); Cards: Veredamu (yellow card) 7' to 9'	Referee: (Hong Kong) Matthew Rodden

=== 5th place ===
Semi-finals
28 January 2018 – 16:52 – Allianz Stadium, Sydney
Fiji	24
Kenya	5
28 January 2018 – 17:14 – Allianz Stadium, Sydney
New Zealand	10
England	5

5th Place Final
28 January 2018 – 19:39 – Allianz Stadium, Sydney
Fiji	7
New Zealand	31

Matches

Semi-finals

28 January 2018	Fiji	24–7	Kenya	Allianz Stadium, Sydney
16:52	Try: Tuwai 3'; Nasilasila 7'; Naduva 10'; Vakurunabili 12'; Con: Nasilasila (2/3) 4', 7'; Dranisinukula (0/1); Cards: Sau (yellow card) 14' to 14'		Try: Oluoch 14'; Con: Oluoch (0/1)	Referee: (South Africa) Craig Joubert

28 January 2018	New Zealand	10–5	England	Allianz Stadium, Sydney
17:14	Try: Masirewa 8'; Ravouvou 11'; Con: Baker (0/2)		Try: Waddleton 7'; Con: Mitchell (0/1)	Referee: (Fiji) Tevita Rokovereni

5th Place Final

28 January 2018	Fiji	7–31	New Zealand	Allianz Stadium, Sydney
19:39	Try: Sau 9'; Con: Nasilasila (1/1) 10'		Try: Clarke 1'; Molia 4'; Koroi 6'; Ware 7'; Mikkelson 8'; Con: Koroi (3/5) 1', 4', 6'	Referee: (Scotland) Sam Grove-White

=== Cup ===
Quarter-finals
28 January 2018 – 11:28 – Allianz Stadium, Sydney
Fiji	7
United States	24
28 January 2018 – 11:50 – Allianz Stadium, Sydney
South Africa	17
Kenya	0
28 January 2018 – 12:02 – Allianz Stadium, Sydney
Australia	24
New Zealand	12
28 January 2018 – 12:24 – Allianz Stadium, Sydney
Argentina	10
England	0

Semi-finals
28 January 2018 – 17:36 – Allianz Stadium, Sydney
United States	7
South Africa	35
28 January 2018 – 17:58 – Allianz Stadium, Sydney
Australia	28
Argentina	0

Cup Final
28 January 2018 – 20:48 – Allianz Stadium, Sydney
South Africa	0
Australia	29
Bronze Medal Match
28 January 2018 – 20:21 – Allianz Stadium, Sydney
United States	10
Argentina	31

Matches

Quarter-finals

28 January 2018	Fiji	7–24	United States	Allianz Stadium, Sydney
11:28	Try: Sau 6'; Con: Nasilasila (1/1) 6'		Try: Niua 3'; Iosefo 7'; Unufe 8'; Baker 10'; Con: Niua (2/4) 7', 10'	Referee: (Scotland) Sam Grove-White

28 January 2018	South Africa	17–0	Kenya	Allianz Stadium, Sydney
11:50	Try: Senatla 2'; Geduld 4'; Agaba 10'; Con: Geduld (1/3) 10'; Cards: Brown (yellow card) 13' to 14'			Referee: (New Zealand) James Doleman

28 January 2018	Australia	24–12	New Zealand	Allianz Stadium, Sydney
12:12	Try: O'Donnell 4'; Taylor 7'; Longbottom 11'; Holland 13'; Con: Stannard (2/4) 7', 14'		Try: Koroi 1', 8'; Con: Knewstubb (1/2) 9'	Referee: (South Africa) Rasta Rasivhenge

28 January 2018	Argentina	10–0	England	Allianz Stadium, Sydney
12:34	Try: Roura 1'; Bazan 4'; Con: Revol (0/2)			Referee: (New Zealand) Richard Kelly

Semi-finals

28 January 2018	United States	7–35	South Africa	Allianz Stadium, Sydney
17:36	Try: Baker 6'; Con: Niua (1/1) 6'; Cards: Niua (yellow card) 7' to 9'		Try: Senatla 2'; Agaba 7'; Kok 8'; Geduld 10'; Senatla 12'; Con: Geduld (5/5) 2', 7', 8', 10', 12'; Cards: Geduld (yellow card) 3' to 5'	Referee: (Australia) Damon Murphy

28 January 2018	Australia	28–0	Argentina	Allianz Stadium, Sydney
17:58	Try: Holland 1', 8'; O'Donnell 6', 14'; Con: Stannard (3/3) 2', 6', 8'; Lucas (1/1) 14'		Cards: Mare (yellow card) 1' to 3'; Sabato (yellow card) 8' to 10'	Referee: (Wales) Craig Evans

Bronze Medal Match

28 January 2018	United States	10–31	Argentina	Allianz Stadium, Sydney
20:21	Try: Iosefo 7'; Pinkleman 14'; Con: Niua (0/1); Williams (0/1)		Try: Sabato 2', 9'; Bazan 4'; Roura 8'; Filizzola 14'; Con: Revol (3/4) 5', 8', 10'; Mare (0/1)	Referee: (Australia) Jordan Way

Cup Final

28 January 2018	South Africa	0–31	Australia	Allianz Stadium, Sydney
20:48			Try: Holland 6'; Stannard 7'; Porch 8'; O'Donnell 10', 12'; Con: Stannard (2/4) 6', 7'; Lucas (0/1)	Referee: (New Zealand) Richard Kelly

== Tournament placings ==
Place	Team	Points
1st place, gold medalist(s)	Australia	22
2nd place, silver medalist(s)	South Africa	19
3rd place, bronze medalist(s)	Argentina	17
4	United States	15
5	New Zealand	13
6	Fiji	12
7	England	10
7	Kenya	10

Place	Team	Points
9	France	8
10	Wales	7
11	Russia	5
11	Samoa	5
13	Canada	3
14	Scotland	2
15	Papua New Guinea	1
15	Spain	1

Source: World Rugby

== Players ==
=== Scoring leaders ===
Tries scored
Rank	Player	Tries
1	(United States) Perry Baker	9
2	(South Africa) Seabelo Senatla	8
3	(Wales) Luke Morgan	7
	(Scotland) Max McFarland	7
5	(Australia) Ben O'Donnell	6

Points scored
Rank	Player	Points
1	(South Africa) Justin Geduld	56
2	(Fiji) Amenoni Nasilasila	45
	(France) Jean-Pascal Barraque	45
	(United States) Perry Baker	45
5	(South Africa) Seabelo Senatla	40

Source: World Rugby

=== Dream Team ===
The following seven players were selected to the tournament Dream Team at the conclusion of the tournament:

Forwards	Backs
(Fiji) Josua Vakurunabili (Australia) Tim Anstee (United States) Ben Pinkelman	(Argentina) Franco Sábato (Australia) Lewis Holland (Australia) Ben O'Donnell (South Africa) Seabelo Senatla

== See also ==
- 2018 Sydney Women's Sevens

World Sevens Series XIX
Preceded by 2017 South Africa Sevens	2018 Sydney Sevens	Succeeded by 2018 New Zealand Sevens
Australian Sevens
Preceded by 2017 Sydney Sevens	2018 Sydney Sevens	Succeeded by 2019 Sydney Sevens
