= 2018 Singapore Sevens =

- 2017–18 World Series
- Host nation: Singapore
- Date: 28–29 April 2018

Cup
- Champion: Fiji
- Runner-up: Australia
- Third: England

Challenge
- Winner: United States

Tournament details
- Matches played: 45
- Tries scored: 277 (average 6.16 per match)
- Most points: (New Zealand) Kurt Baker (42)
- Most tries: (United States) Carlin Isles (8)

The 2018 Singapore Sevens was the eighth tournament of the 2017–18 World Rugby Sevens Series. The tournament was played on 28–29 April 2018 at the National Stadium in Singapore.

== Format ==
Sixteen teams are drawn into four pools of four teams each. Each team plays all the others in their pool once. The top two teams from each pool advance to the Cup quarter finals. The bottom two teams from each group advance to the Challenge Trophy quarter finals.

== Teams ==
The teams for the 2018 Singapore Sevens were:

- Argentina
- Australia
- Canada
- England
- Fiji
- France
- Japan
- Kenya
- New Zealand
- Russia
- Samoa
- Scotland
- Spain
- South Africa
- United States
- Wales

== Pool stage ==
All times in Singapore Standard Time (UTC+08:00). The games as scheduled are as follows:

=== Pool A ===
Team	Pld	W	D	L	PF	PA	PD	Pts
Fiji	3	3	0	0	107	24	+83	9
Spain	3	2	0	1	65	50	+15	7
Japan	3	1	0	2	50	86	–36	5
Russia	3	0	0	3	31	93	–62	3

28 April 2018	Spain	38–5	Russia	National Stadium, Singapore
13:14	Try: Pla 5'm, 7'c Fontes 7'm Poggi 9'c Carrion 12'c Genua 13'm Con: Hernandez (4/5) 5', 7', 9', 12'; Genua (0/1)		Try: Sozonov 2'm Con: Ianiushkin (0/1)	Referee: Craig Evans (Wales)

28 April 2018	Fiji	45–12	Japan	National Stadium, Singapore
13:36	Try: Mocenacagi 2'c Dranisinukula 5'c Naduva 6'c Sau 10'c Tuwai 12'm Sau 13'm Katonibau 14'c Con: Nasilasila (3/3) 3', 5', 6'; Nacuqu (2/4) 10', 14'		Try: Yoshizawa 7'c Kamana 8'm Con: Yoshizawa (1/2) 7'	Referee: Mike O'Brien (USA)

28 April 2018	Spain	22–12	Japan	National Stadium, Singapore
16:40	Try: Pla 1'm, 3'm I Martin 7'm Sainz-Trapaga 13'c Con: Genua (1/1) 13'; Hernandez (0/3)		Try: Sakai 9'c Tupou 14'c Con: Sakai (1/2) 14'	Referee: Tevita Rokovereni (Fiji)

28 April 2018	Fiji	29–7	Russia	National Stadium, Singapore
17:02	Try: Naduva 0'm, 10'; Vakurunabili 2'm Nacuqu 4'c Tamani 13'c Con: Nacuqu (1/3) 4'; Tamani (1/1) 14'; Nasilasila (0/1)		Try: Sozonov 7'c Con: Davydov (1/1) 7'	Referee: Nori Hashimoto (Japan)

28 April 2018	Russia	19–26	Japan	National Stadium, Singapore
20:06	Try: Ostroushko 1'c Babaev 13'c Galinovskiy 14'm Con: Sukhin (1/1) 2'; Gostyuzhev (1/2) 13'		Try: Yoshizawa 3'c, 8'c Koyama 6'c Yasui 11'm Con: Sakai (3/4) 4', 7', 9'	Referee: Mike O'Brien (USA)

28 April 2018	Fiji	33–5	Spain	National Stadium, Singapore
20:28	Try: Naduva 5'c Sau 6'm Dranisinukula 7'c Katonibau 12'c Paul 14'c Con: Naduva (1/1) 5'; Nacuqu (2/3) 7', 14'; Nasilasila (1/1) 12'; Cards: Nacuqu (yellow card) 3' to 5'; Nasoko (yellow card) 8' to 10'		Try: Sainz-Trapaga 2'm Con: Genua (0/1); Cards: Sainz-Trapaga (yellow card) 11' to 13'	Referee: James Doleman (New Zealand)

=== Pool B ===
Team	Pld	W	D	L	PF	PA	PD	Pts
England	3	3	0	0	86	33	+53	9
Kenya	3	2	0	1	86	42	+44	7
United States	3	1	0	2	61	64	–3	5
France	3	0	0	3	12	106	–94	3

28 April 2018	United States	33–12	France	National Stadium, Singapore
12:30	Try: Iosefo 3'c Leuta 5'c Baker 7'm Isles 12'c Thompson 14'c Con: Tomasin (4/5) 4', 6', 12', 14'		Try: Lakafia 9'c, 10'm Con: Aicardi (1/2) 9'	Referee: Matthew Rodden (Hong Kong)

28 April 2018	Kenya	19–28	England	National Stadium, Singapore
12:52	Try: Injera 1'm Ambaka 12'c Oyoo 14'c Con: Agero (2/2) 12', 14'; Oliech (0/1)		Try: Norton 3'c, 6'c Davis 9'c Lindsay-Hague 10'c Con: Mitchell (3/3) 3', 6', 9'; Bibby (1/1) 11'	Referee: Paulo Duarte (Portugal)

28 April 2018	United States	14–19	England	National Stadium, Singapore
15:56	Try: Pinkelman 7'c Baker 13'c Con: Tomasin (1/1) 7' (1/1) Iosefo 13'; Cards: Iosefo (yellow card) 14' to 14'		Try: Davis 1'c Lindsay-Hague 4'c McConnochie 5'm Con: Bibby (2/3) 1', 4'	Referee: Craig Evans (Wales)

28 April 2018	Kenya	34–0	France	National Stadium, Singapore
16:18	Try: Injera 4'c, 7'c, 8'm Odhiambo 5'm, 10'm Amonde 12'm Con: Oliech (2/4) 4', 7'; Agero (0/2)			Referee: James Doleman (New Zealand)

28 April 2018	France	0–39	England	National Stadium, Singapore
19:22			Try: Norton 1'c Kerr 2'm, 7'm, 10'c Hayter 6'm Mitchell 7'm Burgess 13'm Con: Mitchell (1/5) 1'; Bibby (1/2) 10'	Referee: Sam Grove-White (Scotland)

28 April 2018	Kenya	33–14	United States	National Stadium, Singapore
19:44	Try: Ambaka 2'm Oliech 7'c, 10'c Amonde 12'c Ouma 13'c Con: Oliech (2/3) 7', 10'; Agero (2/2) 12', 14'		Try: Williams 8'c Thompson 14'c Con: Tomasin (1/1) 8'; Melphy (1/1) 14'	Referee: Jérémy Rozier (France)

=== Pool C ===
Team	Pld	W	D	L	PF	PA	PD	Pts
South Africa	3	3	0	0	78	29	+49	9
Samoa	3	2	0	1	58	59	–1	7
Canada	3	1	0	2	57	62	–5	5
Argentina	3	0	0	3	40	83	–43	3

28 April 2018	Argentina	14–26	Canada	National Stadium, Singapore
11:44	Try: Bazan Velez 4'c Gonzalez 8'c Con: del Mestre (2/2) 5', 9'; Cards: Bazan Velez (yellow card) 5' (red card) 11'		Try: Jones 6'c Kaay 7'c Douglas 12'm, 14'c Con: Hirayama (3/4) 6', 7', 14'	Referee: Jérémy Rozier (France)

28 April 2018	South Africa	26–5	Samoa	National Stadium, Singapore
12:06	Try: Kok 2'c Soyizwapi 8'm Specman 13'c du Plessis 14'c Con: Afrika (3/4) 3', 12', 14'		Try: Motuga 11'm Con: Tupou (0/1)	Referee: James Doleman (New Zealand)

28 April 2018	Argentina	14–31	Samoa	National Stadium, Singapore
15:12	Try: Passaro 12'c Mare 14'c Con: Mare (2/2) 12', 14'		Try: Tupou 1'm, 7'c Fomai 2'c Alofipo 4'c Motuga 6'm Con: Tupou (3/5) 2', 4', 8'; Cards: Afamasaga (yellow card) 12' to 14'	Referee: Sam Grove-White (Scotland)

28 April 2018	South Africa	26–12	Canada	National Stadium, Singapore
15:34	Try: Soyizwapi 4'c Afrika 5'c S Davids 9'c, 14'm Con: Afrika (3/4) 5', 6', 10'		Try: Coe 2'c Campbell 8'm Con: Hirayama (1/2) 3'; Cards: Kaay (yellow card) 14' to 14'	Referee: Paulo Duarte (Portugal)

28 April 2018	Canada	19–22	Samoa	National Stadium, Singapore
18:38	Try: Hirayama 0'c Douglas 1'm Kay 7'm Con: Hirayama (2/3) 1', 2'		Try: Alofipo 3'm Motuga 4'm Tupou 6'c Apelu 12'c Con: Tupou (1/4) 6'	Referee: Matthew Rodden (Hong Kong)

28 April 2018	South Africa	26–12	Argentina	National Stadium, Singapore
19:00	Try: Soyizwapi 0'm Kok 2'c S Davids 8'c du Plessis 12'c Con: S Davids (3/4) 2', 8', 12'		Try: Passaro 6'c Bazan Velez 7'm Con: Bazan Velez (1/2) 6'	Referee: Craig Evans (Wales)

=== Pool D ===
Team	Pld	W	D	L	PF	PA	PD	Pts
Australia	3	3	0	0	81	32	+49	9
New Zealand	3	2	0	1	66	38	+28	7
Scotland	3	1	0	2	65	60	+5	5
Wales	3	0	0	3	21	103	–82	3

28 April 2018	Scotland	20–24	Australia	National Stadium, Singapore
11:00	Try: Graham 2'm Fergusson 7'm, 8'm Elms 11'm Con: Fergusson (0/4)		Try: O'Donnell 0'm Anderson 5'm Porch 7'c Longbottom 13'c Con: Porch (2/4) 8', 14'	Referee: Craig Evans (Wales)

28 April 2018	New Zealand	32–7	Wales	National Stadium, Singapore
11:22	Try: Ravouvou 1'm Collier 2'm Baker 5'c Joass 8'm Nanai-Seturo 13'm Ng Shiu 14'm Con: Knewstubb (1/3) 5'; Baker (0/1); McGarvey Black (0/2)		Try: Treharne 3'c Con: Davies (1/1) 4'; Cards: Davies (yellow card) 7' to 9'	Referee: Sam Grove-White (Scotland)

28 April 2018	Scotland	33–14	Wales	National Stadium, Singapore
14:28	Try: McLennan McLennan 1'm Graham 5'c Elms 7'c Fergusson 10'c Nayacavou 13'c Con: Fergusson (2/2) 5', 8', 10'; Elms (1/1) 13'; McLennan (0/1)		Try: Davies 7'c Smith 14'c Con: Davies (1/1) 7'; Treharne (1/1) 14'	Referee: Jérémy Rozier (France)

28 April 2018	New Zealand	12–19	Australia	National Stadium, Singapore
14:50	Try: Joass 7'c Collier 11'm Con: Baker (1/1) 7' McGarvey-Black (0/1)		Try: Quinn 3'm Anderson 6'c Porch 13'c Con: Porch (1/2) 6', 14'	Referee: Matthew Rodden (Hong Kong)

28 April 2018	Australia	38–0	Wales	National Stadium, Singapore
17:54	Try: Miller 1'm Porch 3'c Quinn 5', Myers 6'c Skelton 13'c Pietsch 14'c Con: Porch (2/4) 3', 6'; Quinn (2/2) 13', 14'			Referee: James Doleman (New Zealand)

28 April 2018	New Zealand	22–12	Scotland	National Stadium, Singapore
18:16	Try: Ravouvou 0'm, 7'c Collier 4'm Baker 13'm Con: McGarvey-Black (1/3) 7'; Baker (0/1)		Try: Fergusson 5'm McFarland 12'c Con: Fergusson (1/1) 12'; McLennan (0/1)	Referee: Paulo Duarte (Portugal)

== Knockout stage ==
=== 13th place ===
Semi-finals
29 April 2018 – 14:38 – National Stadium, Singapore
Japan	29
France	14
29 April 2018 – 15:00 – National Stadium, Singapore
Russia	7
Argentina	12

13th Place Final
29 April 2018 – 18:14 – National Stadium, Singapore
Japan	31
Argentina	24

Matches

Semifinals

29 April 2018	Japan	29–14	France	National Stadium, Singapore
14:38	Try: Ozawa 1'c Koyama 5'm Motomura 7'c Sakai 9'm, 14'm Con: Yoshizawa (2/3) 2', 7'; Sakai (0/2)		Try: Daoudou 3'c Lagarde 11'c Con: Aicardi (1/1) 3'; Lagarde (1/1) 11'; Cards: Alerte (yellow card) 12' to 14'	Referee: Sam Grove-White (Scotland)

29 April 2018	Russia	7–12	Argentina	National Stadium, Singapore
15:00	Try: Ostroushko 7'c Con: Sukhin (1/1) 7'; Cards: Babaev (yellow card) 13' to 14'		Try: Passaro 6'm Bazan Velez 12'c Con: Bazan Velez (1/1) 13'; Mare (0/1)	Referee: Nori Hashimoto (Japan)

13th Place Final

29 April 2018	Japan	31–24	Argentina	National Stadium, Singapore
18:14	Try: Ozawa 0'c Noguchi 2'c Motomura 5'm Sakai 8'm, 12'c Con: Yoshizawa (2/3) 1', 2'; Sakai (1/2) 13'		Try: Schultz 4'c Provenzano 7'c Mare 11'm Gonzalez 14'm Con: Mare (2/3) 4', 7'; Freyre (0/1); Cards: Escobio (yellow card) 8' to 10'	Referee: Tevita Rokovereni (Fiji)

=== Challenge Trophy ===
Quarter-finals
29 April 2018 – 11:00 – National Stadium, Singapore
Japan	19
Wales	28
29 April 2018 – 11:22 – National Stadium, Singapore
Canada	26
France	7
29 April 2018 – 11:44 – National Stadium, Singapore
Scotland	19
Russia	14
29 April 2018 – 12:06 – National Stadium, Singapore
United States	36
Argentina	12

Semi-finals
29 April 2018 – 15:22 – National Stadium, Singapore
Wales	10
Canada	17
29 April 2018 – 15:44 – National Stadium, Singapore
Scotland	12
United States	33

Challenge Trophy Final
29 April 2018 – 18:36 – National Stadium, Singapore
Canada	12
United States	26

Matches

Quarter-finals

29 April 2018	Japan	19–28	Wales	National Stadium, Singapore
11:00	Try: Nakano 3'm, 12'c Yoshizawa 6'c Con: Sakai (1/2) 6', 13'		Try: Jenkins 4'c Devine 7'c Morgan 11'c, 14'c Con: Davies (3/3) 5', 8', 11'; Treharne (1/1) 14'; Cards: Morgan (yellow card) 2' to 4'	Referee: Mike O'Brien (USA)

29 April 2018	Canada	26–7	France	National Stadium, Singapore
11:22	Try: Douglas 5'c Jones 7'c Fauilefau 10'm Campbell 14'c Con: Hirayama (3/4) 6', 7', 14'		Try: Bonnefond 2'c Con: Aicardi (1/1) 2'	Referee: Nori Hashimoto (Japan)

29 April 2018	Scotland	19–14	Russia	National Stadium, Singapore
11:44	Try: Farndale 2'm Fergusson 7'c Graham 7'c Con: McLennan (2/3) 7', 8'		Try: Gostyuzhev 4'c Ostroushko 6'c Con: Sukhin (2/2) 4', 6'	Referee: Tevita Rokovereni (Fiji)

29 April 2018	United States	36–12	Argentina	National Stadium, Singapore
12:06	Try: Iosefo 1'c, 6'm Williams 8'c Isles 10'm, 12'c, 14'm Con: Tomasin (3/6) 6', 8', 13'		Try: Provenzano 3'm Barbier 4'c Con: del Mestre (1/1) 5'; Bazan Velez (0/1)	Referee: Jérémy Rozier (France)

Semi-finals

29 April 2018	Wales	10–17	Canada	National Stadium, Singapore
15:22	Try: Williams 2'm Jenkins 8'm Con: Treharne (0/2)		Try: Douglas 0'c Fuailefau 7'm Mullins 10'm Con: Hirayama (1/3) 1'	Referee: Mike O'Brien (USA)

29 April 2018	Scotland	12–33	United States	National Stadium, Singapore
15:44	Try: Godsmark 7'c Fergusson 7'm Con: Fergusson (1/2) 7'		Try: Isles 4'c, 7'm, 12'c Barrett 9'c Melphy 14'c Con: Tomasin (4/5) 4', 10', 13', 14'; Cards: Barrett (yellow card) 7' to 9'	Referee: Tevita Rokovereni (Fiji)

Challenge Trophy Final

29 April 2018	Canada	12–26	United States	National Stadium, Singapore
18:36	Try: Fuailefau 1'm Hirayama 5'c Con: Hirayama (1/2) 5'		Try: Williams 3'c, 10'c Isles 7'c Tomasin 8'm Con: Tomasin (3/4) 3', 8', 10'	Referee: Jérémy Rozier (France)

=== 5th place ===
Semi-finals
29 April 2018 – 16:06 – National Stadium, Singapore
New Zealand	17
Kenya	7
29 April 2018 – 16:28 – National Stadium, Singapore
Spain	7
Samoa	24

5th Place Final
29 April 2018 – 19:11 – National Stadium, Singapore
New Zealand	36
Samoa	17

Matches

Semi-finals

29 April 2018	New Zealand	17–7	Kenya	National Stadium, Singapore
16:06	Try: Baker 0'c Collier 6'm Joass 10'm Con: Baker (1/2); Rokolisoa (0/1)		Try: Sikuta 4'c Con: Agero (1/1) 4'	Referee: Paulo Duarte (Portugal)

29 April 2018	Spain	7–24	Samoa	National Stadium, Singapore
16:28	Try: Fontes 5'c Con: Hernandez (1/1) 6'; Cards: Hernandez (yellow card) 7' to 9'		Try: Alofipo 1'm, 9'm Neli 7'c Apelu 12'c Con: Tupou (1/3) 7'; Paulo (1/1) 13'	Referee: Jérémy Rozier (France)

5th Place Final

29 April 2018	New Zealand	36–17	Samoa	National Stadium, Singapore
19:11	Try: Nareki 0'm Molia 1'm Ng Shiu 7'c Baker 7'm Stanaway 9'c Nanai-Seturo 14'c Con: Baker (2/4) 7', 9'; Rokolisoa (1/1) 14'; McGarvey-Black (0/1)		Try: Tuatagaloa 3'm Tupou 4'm Motuga 11'c Con: Paulo (1/2) 11'; Tupou (0/1)	Referee: Paulo Duarte (Portugal)

=== Cup ===
Quarter-finals
29 April 2018 – 12:30 – National Stadium, Singapore
Fiji	24
New Zealand	19
29 April 2018 – 12:52 – National Stadium, Singapore
South Africa	24
Kenya	12
29 April 2018 – 13:14 – National Stadium, Singapore
Australia	7
Spain	5
29 April 2018 – 13:36 – National Stadium, Singapore
England	12
Samoa	5

Semi-finals
29 April 2018 – 16:50 – National Stadium, Singapore
Fiji	12
South Africa	10
29 April 2018 – 17:12 – National Stadium, Singapore
Australia	15
England	7

Cup Final
29 April 2018 – 20:00 – National Stadium, Singapore
Fiji	28
Australia	22
Bronze Final
29 April 2018 – 19:35 – National Stadium, Singapore
South Africa	24
England	26

Matches

Quarter-finals

29 April 2018	Fiji	24–19	New Zealand	National Stadium, Singapore
12:30	Try: Vakurunabili 2'm Nasilasila 7'm, 14'c Sau 8'c Con: Nasilasila (1/3) 8'; Tamani (1/1) 14'		Try: Baker 1'm, 4'c Ravouvou 12'c Con: Baker (2/3) 4', 12'	Referee: Craig Evans (Wales)

29 April 2018	South Africa	24–12	Kenya	National Stadium, Singapore
12:52	Try: Soyizwapi 2'm, 6'c, 10'c Bezuidenhout 5'm Con: Afrika (2/4) 7', 10'		Try: Injera 8'c, 14'm Con: Oliech (1/1) 9'; Agero (0/1)	Referee: James Doleman (New Zealand)

29 April 2018	Australia	5–7	Spain	National Stadium, Singapore
13:14	Try: O'Donnell 3'c Con: Porch (1/1) 3'		Try: De Juan 1'm Con: Hernandez (0/1)	Referee: Paulo Duarte (Portugal)

29 April 2018	England	12–5	Samoa	National Stadium, Singapore
13:36	Try: Mitchell 4'c Kerr 10'm Con: Mitchell (1/1) 5'; Bibby (0/1)		Try: Tuatagaloa 7'm Con: Tupou (0/1)	Referee: Matthew Rodden (Hong Kong)

Semi-finals

29 April 2018	Fiji	12–10	South Africa	National Stadium, Singapore
16:50	Try: Naduva 7'm Sau 12'c Con: Nasilasila (0/1) 12'; Nacuqu (0/1); Cards: Nasilasila (yellow card) 14' to 14'		Try: Kok 1'm Soyizwapi 5'm Con: Afrika (0/2); Cards: Afrika (yellow card) 7' to 9'	Referee: Craig Evans (Wales)

29 April 2018	Australia	15–7	England	National Stadium, Singapore
17:12	Try: Parahi 1'c Pietsch 11'm Con: Porch (1/2) 1'		Try: Mitchell 4'c Con: Mitchell (1/1) 4'; Cards: Mitchell (yellow card) 13' to 14'	Referee: Sam Grove-White (Scotland)

Bronze Final

29 April 2018	South Africa	24–26	England	National Stadium, Singapore
19:35	Try: du Plessis 0'm Afrika 3'm Gans 9'c Kok 11'c Con: Afrika (2/4) 9', 11'; Cards: du Plessis (yellow card) 6' to 8'		Try: Hayter 4'm McConnochie 6'c Mitchell 7'c Ellery 13'c Con: Mitchell (3/4) 7', 7', 13'; Cards: Mitchell (yellow card) 14' to 14'	Referee: Matthew Rodden (Hong Kong Rugby Football Union)

Cup Final

29 April 2018	Fiji	28–22	Australia	National Stadium, Singapore
20:00	Try: Nacuqu 2'c, 4'c Tuwai 8'c Naduva 14'c Con: Nasilasila (3/3) 3', 9', 14'; Nacuqu (1/1) 4'; Cards: Sau (yellow card) 6' to 8'		Try: Pietsch 6'm Longbottom 7'm Quinn 10'c Porch 12'm Con: Porch (1/3) 10'	Referee: James Doleman (New Zealand)

== Tournament placings ==
Place	Team	Points
1st place, gold medalist(s)	Fiji	22
2nd place, silver medalist(s)	Australia	19
3rd place, bronze medalist(s)	England	17
4	South Africa	15
5	New Zealand	13
6	Samoa	12
7	Kenya	10
7	Spain	10

Place	Team	Points
9	United States	8
10	Canada	7
11	Scotland	5
11	Wales	5
13	Japan	3
14	Argentina	2
15	France	1
15	Russia	1

Source: World Rugby

== Players ==
=== Scoring leaders ===
Tries scored
Rank	Player	Tries
1	(United States) Carlin Isles	8
2	(South Africa) Siviwe Soyizwapi	7
3	(Fiji) Alasio Sovita Naduva	6
	(Kenya) Collins Injera	6
	(New Zealand) Kurt Baker	6

Points scored
Rank	Player	Points
1	(New Zealand) Kurt Baker	42
2	(Australia) John Porch	41
3	(United States) Carlin Isles	40
	(Scotland) Robbie Fergusson	40
5	(Japan) Katsuyuki Sakai	39

Source: World Rugby

=== Dream Team ===
The following seven players were selected to the tournament Dream Team at the conclusion of the tournament:

Forwards	Backs
(Samoa) Alamanda Motuga (Kenya) Oscar Ouma (New Zealand) Trael Joass	(Fiji) Eroni Sau (Australia) John Porch (Australia) Ben O'Donnell (Fiji) Alasio Sovita Naduva

World Sevens Series XIX
Preceded by 2018 Hong Kong Sevens	2018 Singapore Sevens	Succeeded by 2018 London Sevens
Singapore Sevens
Preceded by 2017 Singapore Sevens	2018 Singapore Sevens	Succeeded by 2019 Singapore Sevens
