= 2018 New Zealand Sevens =

- Sevens World Series XIX
- Host nation: New Zealand
- Date: 3–4 February 2018

Cup
- Champion: Fiji
- Runner-up: South Africa
- Third: Australia

Challenge Cup
- Winner: United States

Tournament details
- Matches played: 45
- Tries scored: 255 (average 5.67 per match)
- Most points: (United States) Perry Baker (40) (Wales) Luke Morgan (40) (South Africa) Seabelo Senatla (40)
- Most tries: (United States) Perry Baker (8) (Wales) Luke Morgan (8) (South Africa) Seabelo Senatla (8)

The 2018 New Zealand Sevens was the fourth tournament within the 2017–18 World Rugby Sevens Series and the nineteenth edition of the New Zealand Sevens, and the first to be held in Hamilton. It was held over the weekend of 3–4 February 2018 at FMG Stadium Waikato.

== Format ==
The teams were drawn into four pools of four teams each, with each team playing every other team in their pool once. The top two teams from each pool advanced to the Cup/5th place brackets. The bottom two teams from each group went to the Challenge trophy/13th place brackets.

== Teams ==
Fifteen core teams are participating in the tournament along with one invited team, the highest-placing non-core team of the 2017 Oceania Sevens Championship, Papua New Guinea:

- Argentina
- Australia
- Canada
- England
- Fiji
- France
- Kenya
- New Zealand
- Papua New Guinea
- Russia
- Samoa
- Scotland
- South Africa
- Spain
- United States
- Wales

== Pool stage ==
All times in New Zealand Daylight Time (UTC+13:00)

=== Pool A ===
Team	Pld	W	D	L	PF	PA	PD	Pts
Fiji	3	3	0	0	78	25	+53	9
Australia	3	2	0	1	62	38	+24	7
Wales	3	1	0	2	36	75	–39	5
Spain	3	0	0	3	38	74	–36	3

3 February 2018	Fiji	28–0	Wales	FMG Stadium Waikato, Hamilton
12:36	Try: Sau 1'; Dranisinukula 3'; Veremalua 11'; Nasoko 14'; Con: Nasilasila (2/2) 1', 4'; Ravouvou (2/2) 12', 14'; Cards: Kunavula (yellow card) 6' to 8'			Referee: (South Africa) Craig Joubert

3 February 2018	Australia	21–5	Spain	FMG Stadium Waikato, Hamilton
12:58	Try: O'Donnell 3'; Connor 9'; Anderson 13'; Con: Stannard (2/2) 3', 9'; Lucas (1/1) 14'		Try: Sainz 7'; Con: Hernandez (0/1)	Referee: (Wales) Craig Evans

3 February 2018	Fiji	24–10	Spain	FMG Stadium Waikato, Hamilton
16:02	Try: Sau 1'; Tuwai 5'; Naduva 12'; Nasilasila 14'; Con: Ravouvou (1/2) 5'; Nasilasila 14'; Cards: (yellow card) 7' to 9' Kunavula; (yellow card) 7' to 9' Sau		Try: Pla 7'; Sainz 9'; Con: Hernandez (1/3) 10'	Referee: (Australia) Jordan Way

3 February 2018	Australia	26–7	Wales	FMG Stadium Waikato, Hamilton
16:24	Try: O'Donnell 8', 14'; Longbottom 11'; Taylor 13'; Con: Stannard (2/2) 9', 11'; Lucas (1/2) 13'		Try: Millard 12'; Con: Treharne (1/1) 12'	Referee: (New Zealand) Richard Kelly

3 February 2018	Wales	29–21	Spain	FMG Stadium Waikato, Hamilton
19:28	Try: Millard 2'; Morgan 5', 8'; Treharne 7'; Roach 12'; Con: Jones (2/5) 2', 5'		Try: Genua 6'; Martin 10'; Hernandez 14'; Con: Hernandez (3/3) 7', 10', 14'	Referee: (Fiji) Tevita Rokovereni

3 February 2018	Australia	15–26	Fiji	FMG Stadium Waikato, Hamilton
19:50	Try: Anstee 4', 5'; Anderson 9'; Con: Stannard (0/3)		Try: Sau 1', 14'; Vakurunabili 7'; Veremalua 10'; Con: Nasilasila (2/3) 1', 11'; Ravouvou (1/1) 14'	Referee: (New Zealand) James Doleman

=== Pool B ===
Team	Pld	W	D	L	PF	PA	PD	Pts
South Africa	3	3	0	0	102	12	+90	9
England	3	2	0	1	81	28	+53	7
Papua New Guinea	3	1	0	2	38	70	–32	5
Russia	3	0	0	3	7	118	–111	3

3 February 2018	England	47–0	Russia	FMG Stadium Waikato, Hamilton
11:44	Try: McConnochie 1', 7'; Waddleton 2'; Norton 6'; Olowowfela 8', 11'; Bowen 14'; Con: Mitchell (6/7) 1', 6', 7' 9', 12', 14'			Referee: (Fiji) Tevita Rokovereni

3 February 2018	South Africa	36–5	Papua New Guinea	FMG Stadium Waikato, Hamilton
12:06	Try: Sage 1'; Specman 2', 14'; Senatla 5', 7'; Davids 10'; Con: Geduld (2/4) 3', 6'; Specman (0/1); Afrika (1/1) 14'; Cards: Agaba (yellow card) 7' to 9'		Try: Tokavai 3'; Con: Guise (0/1)	Referee: (Scotland) Sam Grove-White

3 February 2018	England	27–0	Papua New Guinea	FMG Stadium Waikato, Hamilton
15:10	Try: Bowen 1', 6', 7'; Burgess '9; Norton 12'; Con: Mitchell (1/4) '9; Bibby (0/1)			Referee: (South Africa) Rasta Rasivhenge

3 February 2018	South Africa	38–0	Russia	FMG Stadium Waikato, Hamilton
15:32	Try: Specman 7', 8'; Brown 10'; Senatla 11', 14'; Notshe 14'; Con: Geduld (4/4) 7', 9', 10', 12'; Afrika (0/2)			Referee: (New Zealand) James Doleman

3 February 2018	Russia	7–33	Papua New Guinea	FMG Stadium Waikato, Hamilton
18:44	Try: Lazarenko 4'; Con: Ianiushkin (1/1) 4'; Cards: (yellow card) 11' to 13' Kapalin		Try: Tatut 1', 14'; Kapana 5' 7'; Guise 11'; Con: Tokavai (2/3) 6', 7'; Guise 12'; Vali 14'	Referee: (Australia) Jordan Way

3 February 2018	South Africa	28–7	England	FMG Stadium Waikato, Hamilton
19:06	Try: Agaba 4'; Senatla 5', 7'; Specman 11'; Con: Geduld (4/4) 4', 6', 7', 11'		Try: Norton 14'; Con: Mitchell (1/1) 14'; Cards: (yellow card) 11' to 13' Olowofela	Referee: (Australia) Damon Murphy

=== Pool C ===
Team	Pld	W	D	L	PF	PA	PD	Pts
New Zealand	3	3	0	0	93	27	+69	9
Scotland	3	1	0	2	45	57	–12	5
Argentina	3	1	0	2	45	59	–14	5
France	3	1	0	2	49	92	–43	5

3 February 2018	New Zealand	52–7	France	FMG Stadium Waikato, Hamilton
13:20	Try: Ravouvou 1'; Mikkelson 3'; Curry 4', 8'; Molia 6'; Ware 12'; Nanai-Seturo 14'; Masirewa 14'; Con: Koroi (5/5) 2', 4', 5', 7', 9'; Webber (1/3) 12'		Try: Manevy 10'; Con: Barraque (1/1) 10'	Referee: (Australia) Jordan Way

3 February 2018	Argentina	19–14	Scotland	FMG Stadium Waikato, Hamilton
13:42	Try: Sabato 9' del Mestre 11'; Gonzalez 14'; Con: Bazan Velez (0/1) del Mestre (2/2) 12', 14'		Try: McFarland 2'; Riddell 6'; Con: Lowe (2/2) 2', 6'	Referee: (New Zealand) Richard Kelly

3 February 2018	New Zealand	24–5	Scotland	FMG Stadium Waikato, Hamilton
16:46	Try: Mikkelson 3'; Curry 7'; Koroi 11'; Dickson 14'; Con: Koroi (2/3) 3', 7'; Webber (0/1)		Try: Elms 14'; Con: Lowe (0/1)	Referee: (Fiji) Tevita Rokovereni

3 February 2018	Argentina	14–28	France	FMG Stadium Waikato, Hamilton
17:08	Try: Barraque 2', 14'; Lakafia 4'; Riva 8'; Con: Barraque (4/4) 2', 5', 8', 14'		Try: Sabato 7'; Gonzalez 12'; Con: Mare (1/1) 7' del Mestre (1/1) 12'	Referee: (South Africa) Craig Joubert

3 February 2018	France	14–26	Scotland	FMG Stadium Waikato, Hamilton
20:12	Try: Lagarde 3'; Berenguel 14'; Con: Barraque (1/1) 3'; Mazzoleni (1/1) 14'		Try: Riddell 2'; McFarland 7', 11'; Elms 13'; Con: Lowe (1/1) 2'; Fergusson (2/3) 7', 12'	Referee: (Hong Kong) Matthew Rodden

3 February 2018	Argentina	12–17	New Zealand	FMG Stadium Waikato, Hamilton
20:34	Try: Gonzalez 2' del Mestre 4'; Con: del Mestre (1/2) 2', 4'		Try: Stanaway 1'; Koroi 9'; Ravouvou 13'; Con: Koroi (0/2); Webber (1/1) 14'	Referee: (South Africa) Rasta Rasivhenge

=== Pool D ===
Team	Pld	W	D	L	PF	PA	PD	Pts
Kenya	3	2	1	0	57	47	+10	8
Samoa	3	2	0	1	50	43	+7	7
United States	3	1	1	1	57	47	+10	6
Canada	3	0	0	3	42	69	–27	3

3 February 2018	Kenya	19–14	Samoa	FMG Stadium Waikato, Hamilton
11:00	Try: Ouma 4'; Oyoo 6'; Oliech 8'; Con: Oliech (2/3) 5', 9'		Try: Perez 1'; Iosefo 11'; Con: Mealoi (2/2) 1', 12'	Referee: (South Africa) Rasta Rasivhenge

3 February 2018	United States	28–14	Canada	FMG Stadium Waikato, Hamilton
11:22	Try: Baker 6', 10'; Unufe 7'; Iosefo 13'; Con: Barrett (1/1) 6'; Niua (3/3) 8', 10', 14'		Try: Hirayama 1'; Moonlight 4'; Con: Hirayama (2/2) 1', 5'; Cards: McCloskey (yellow card) 9' to 11'	Referee: (New Zealand) James Doleman

3 February 2018	Kenya	19–14	Canada	FMG Stadium Waikato, Hamilton
14:26	Try: Ndayara 4'; Ouma 6'; Oluoch 11'; Con: Oliech (2/3) 4', 11'		Try: Kaay 7', 10'; Con: Hirayama (2/2) 8', 10'	Referee: (Hong Kong) Matthew Rodden

3 February 2018	United States	10–14	Samoa	FMG Stadium Waikato, Hamilton
14:48	Try: Pinkelman 8'; Baker 10'; Con: Niua (0/2)		Try: Paulo 7'; Leilua 14'; Con: Mealoi (2/2) 7', 14'	Referee: (Australia) Damon Murphy

3 February 2018	Samoa	22–14	Canada	FMG Stadium Waikato, Hamilton
18:00	Try: Paulo 1'; Fomai 4'; Afamasaga 7'; Mealoi 9'; Con: Mealoi (1/4) 7'		Try: Cambell 11'; Bradley 13'; Con: Hirayama (2/2) 11', 14'	Referee: (Wales) Craig Evans

3 February 2018	United States	19–19	Kenya	FMG Stadium Waikato, Hamilton
18:22	Try: Baker 7'; Isles 8', 11'; Con: Niua (2/3) 7', 8'		Try: Oyoo 1'; Oluoch 4'; Ndayara 5'; Con: Oliech (1/2) 4, 6'; Cards: (yellow card) 9' to 11' Agero	Referee: (Scotland) Sam Grove-White

== Knockout stage ==
=== 13th Place ===
Semi-finals
4 February 2018 – 14:19 – FMG Stadium Waikato, Hamilton
Wales	33
Russia	7
4 February 2018 – 14:41 – FMG Stadium Waikato, Hamilton
Spain	14
France	19

13th Place Final
4 February 2018 – 18:03 – FMG Stadium Waikato, Hamilton
Wales	17
France	19

Matches

Semi-finals

4 February 2018	Wales	33–7	Russia	FMG Stadium Waikato, Hamilton
14:19	Try: Morgan 2', 3', 8'; Jenkins 6'; Treharne 13'; Con: Treharne (4/5) 3', 4', 8', 14'		Try: Roshchin 11'; Con: Roshchin (1/1) 11'	Referee: (Australia) Damon Murphy

4 February 2018	Spain	14–19	France	FMG Stadium Waikato, Hamilton
14:41	Try: Sainz-Trapaga 4'; Levy 14'; Con: Hernandez (1/1) 4', 14'		Try: Lakafia 6'; Veredamu 7'; Dall'igna 12'; Con: Barraque (2/2) 7', 12'	Referee: (Scotland) Sam Grove-White

13th Place Final

4 February 2018	Wales	17–19	France	FMG Stadium Waikato, Hamilton
18:03	Try: Morgan 6', 7', 10'; Con: Treharne (1/3) 10'		Try: Lagarde 2'; Parez 12', 13'; Con: Barraque (2/3) 2', 12'	Referee: (Scotland) Sam Grove-White

=== Challenge Trophy ===
Quarter-finals
4 February 2018 – 11:00 – FMG Stadium Waikato, Hamilton
Wales	14
Canada	19
4 February 2018 – 11:22 – FMG Stadium Waikato, Hamilton
Argentina	21
Russia	12
4 February 2018 – 11:44 – FMG Stadium Waikato, Hamilton
United States	29
Spain	12
4 February 2018 – 12:06 – FMG Stadium Waikato, Hamilton
Papua New Guinea	35
France	0

Semi-finals
4 February 2018 – 15:03 – FMG Stadium Waikato, Hamilton
Canada	12
Argentina	14
4 February 2018 – 15:25 – FMG Stadium Waikato, Hamilton
United States	42
Papua New Guinea	12

Challenge Trophy Final
4 February 2018 – 18:33 – FMG Stadium Waikato, Hamilton
Argentina	12
United States	31

Matches

Quarter-finals

4 February 2018	Wales	14–19 (a.e.t.)	Canada	FMG Stadium Waikato, Hamilton
11:00	Try: Lewis 7'; Treharne 9'; Con: Treharne (2/2) 7', 10'; Pen: Treharne (0/1) 15'		Try: Douglas 3', 14'; Hirayama 19'; Con: Hirayama (2/2) 3', 14'	Referee: (South Africa) Rasta Rasivhenge

4 February 2018	Argentina	21–12	Russia	FMG Stadium Waikato, Hamilton
11:22	Try: Roura 4'; Escobio 7'; Filizzola 10'; Con: del Mestre (3/3) 5', 7', 10'		Try: Ianiushkin 3'; Gostyuzhev 14'; Con: Ianiushkin (1/1) 3'; Solomyannyy (0/1)	Referee: (New Zealand) Richard Kelly

4 February 2018	United States	29–12	Spain	FMG Stadium Waikato, Hamilton
11:44	Try: Iosefo 3'; Baker 14', 9'; Barrett 10'; Isles 14'; Con: Niua (2/5) 4', 10'		Try: Martin 6'; Sainz 13'; Con: Hernandez (1/1) 6'; Genua (0/1)	Referee: (Hong Kong) Matthew Rodden

4 February 2018	Papua New Guinea	35–0	France	FMG Stadium Waikato, Hamilton
12:06	Try: Kapana 2', 9'; Tokavai 7'; Rova 8'; Tirang 11'; Con: Guise (4/4) 2', 8', 10', 12'; Tokavai 7'; Cards: Shalandra (yellow card) 13' to 14'			Referee: (Fiji) Tevita Rokovereni

Semi-finals

4 February 2018	Canada	12–14	Argentina	FMG Stadium Waikato, Hamilton
15:03	Try: Bradley 4'; Douglas 14'; Con: Hirayama (1/1) 14'		Try: Gonzalez 5'; Provenzano 8'; Con: del Mestre (1/1) 6', 8'	Referee: (Hong Kong) Matthew Rodden

4 February 2018	United States	42–12	Papua New Guinea	FMG Stadium Waikato, Hamilton
15:25	Try: Williams 3', 7'; Baker 5'; Leuta 8'; Iosefo 9'; Isles 13'; Con: Niua (6/6) 4', 6', 7', 8', 10', 14'		Try: Kapana 12'; Shalandra 14'; Con: Tokavai (1/2) 12'; Cards: Kapana (yellow card) 3' to 5'	Referee: (Fiji) Tevita Rokovereni

Challenge Trophy Final

4 February 2018	Argentina	12–31	United States	FMG Stadium Waikato, Hamilton
18:33	Try: Roura 7'; Moroni 12'; Con: del Mestre (1/2) 12'; Cards: del Mestre (yellow card) 4' to 6'		Try: Barrett 2', 3'; Baker 8'; Niua 10'; Pinkelman 13'; Con: Niua (3/5) 8', 10', 13'	Referee: (New Zealand) James Doleman

=== 5th Place ===
Semi-finals
4 February 2018 – 16:05 – FMG Stadium Waikato, Hamilton
Samoa	22
England	17
4 February 2018 – 16:27 – FMG Stadium Waikato, Hamilton
Kenya	33
Scotland	19

5th Place Final
4 February 2018 – 19:03 – FMG Stadium Waikato, Hamilton
Samoa	19
Kenya	15

Matches

Semi-finals

4 February 2018	Samoa	22–17 (a.e.t.)	England	FMG Stadium Waikato, Hamilton
16:05	Try: Iosefo 3'; Solia 5'; Afamasaga 10'; Leilual 15'; Con: Mealoi (1/3) 3'		Try: Lindsay-Hague 1'; Burgess 7'; Bowen 13'; Con: Bibby 13'	Referee: (Australia) Jordan Way

4 February 2018	Kenya	33–19	Scotland	FMG Stadium Waikato, Hamilton
16:27	Try: Ouma 3', 8'; Ombasa 6'; Oluoch 10'; Ambaka 12'; Con: Agero 4'; Ligamy 6'; Tanga 10'; Oliech 13'; Cards: Ochieng (yellow card) 10' to 12'		Try: Cuthbert 1'; Riddell 2'; McFarland 14'; Con: Lowe (2/3) 1', 2'	Referee: (Australia) Damon Murphy

5th Place Final

4 February 2018	Samoa	19–15	Kenya	FMG Stadium Waikato, Hamilton
19:03	Try: Fomai 1', 7'; Iosefo 3'; Con: Mealoi (2/3) 3', 7'; Cards: Whitaker (yellow card) 14' to !4'		Try: Agero 7'; Ngethe 10'; Owira 14'; Con: Agero (0/1); Oliech (0/1)	Referee: (South Africa) Rasta Rasivhenge

=== Cup ===
Quarter-finals
4 February 2018 – 12:36 – FMG Stadium Waikato, Hamilton
Fiji	12
Samoa	10
4 February 2018 – 12:58 – FMG Stadium Waikato, Hamilton
New Zealand	19
England	12
4 February 2018 – 13:20 – FMG Stadium Waikato, Hamilton
Kenya	12
Australia	33
4 February 2018 – 13:42 – FMG Stadium Waikato, Hamilton
South Africa	22
Scotland	0

Semi-finals
4 February 2018 – 16:49 – FMG Stadium Waikato, Hamilton
Fiji	14
New Zealand	12
4 February 2018 – 17:11 – FMG Stadium Waikato, Hamilton
Australia	5
South Africa	24

Cup Final
4 February 2018 – 20:03 – FMG Stadium Waikato, Hamilton
Fiji	24
South Africa	17
Bronze Medal Match
4 February 2018 – 19:33 – FMG Stadium Waikato, Hamilton
New Zealand	7
Australia	8

Matches

Quarter-finals

4 February 2018	Fiji	12-10	Samoa	FMG Stadium Waikato, Hamilton
12:36	Try: Mocenacagi 3'; Nasoko 14'; Con: Nasilasila (1/1) 4'; Ravouvou (0/1)		Try: Langkilde 7'; Iosefo 8'; Con: Mealoi (0/2)	Referee: (Wales) Craig Evans

4 February 2018	New Zealand	19–12	England	FMG Stadium Waikato, Hamilton
12:58	Try: Mikkelson 3'; Koroi 6'; Curry 13'; Con: Koroi (2/3) 7', 13'		Try: McConnochie 1', 8'; Con: Mitchell (1/2) 2'; Cards: Burgess (yellow card) 12' to 14'	Referee: (South Africa) Craig Joubert

4 February 2018	Kenya	12–33	Australia	FMG Stadium Waikato, Hamilton
13:20	Try: Sikuta 9'; Ligamy 14'; Con: Ligamy (1/1) 14'; Oliech (0/1); Cards: Oluoch (yellow card) 5' to 7'		Try: Lucas 1'; Porch 3'; Anderson 4', 7'; O'Donnell 6'; Con: Stannard (4/5) 1', 5', 6', 7'	Referee: (New Zealand) James Doleman

4 February 2018	South Africa	17–0	Scotland	FMG Stadium Waikato, Hamilton
13:42	Try: Geduld 4', 7'; Senatla 11'; Afrika 14'; Con: Geduld (1/4) 7'			Referee: (Australia) Jordan Way

Semi-finals

4 February 2018	Fiji	14–12	New Zealand	FMG Stadium Waikato, Hamilton
16:49	Try: Vakurunabili 1'; Kunavula 9'; Con: Nasilasila (2/2) 1', 10'		Try: Dickson 4'; Koroi 8'; Con: Koroi (1/2) 8'	Referee: (South Africa) Rasta Rasivhenge

4 February 2018	Australia	5–24	South Africa	FMG Stadium Waikato, Hamilton
17:11	Try: Anstee 7'; Con: (0/1)		Try: Afrika 1', 9'; Senatla 5'; Smith 14'; Con: Du Preez 10'; Afrika 14'; Cards: Senatla (yellow card) 7' to 9'	Referee: (New Zealand) Richard Kelly

Bronze Medal Match

4 February 2018	New Zealand	7–8	Australia	FMG Stadium Waikato, Hamilton
19:33	Try: Curry 4'; Con: Webber (1/1) 4'; Cards: Baker (yellow card) 7' to 9'		Try: Porch 8'; Con: Stannard (0/1); Pen: Stannard (1/1) 14'	Referee: (Wales) Craig Evans

Cup Final

4 February 2018	Fiji	24–17	South Africa	FMG Stadium Waikato, Hamilton
20:03	Try: Naduva 4', 8', 11'; Sau 14'; Con: Nasilasila (2/4) 8', 12'; Cards: Vakurunabili (yellow card) 1' to 3'		Try: Smith 2'; Brown 6'; Du Preez 7'; Con: Afrika (1/2) 7'; Du Preez (0/1); Cards: Du Preez (yellow card) 9' to 11'	Referee: (New Zealand) Richard Kelly

== Tournament placings ==
Place	Team	Points
1st place, gold medalist(s)	Fiji	22
2nd place, silver medalist(s)	South Africa	19
3rd place, bronze medalist(s)	Australia	17
4	New Zealand	15
5	Samoa	13
6	Kenya	12
7	England	10
7	Scotland	10

Place	Team	Points
9	United States	8
10	Argentina	7
11	Canada	5
11	Papua New Guinea	5
13	France	3
14	Wales	2
15	Russia	1
15	Spain	1

Source: World Rugby

== Players ==
=== Scoring leaders ===
Tries scored
Rank	Player	Tries
1	(Wales) Luke Morgan	8
	(United States) Perry Baker	8
	(South Africa) Seabelo Senatla	8
4	(Wales) Eroni Sau	5
	(Papua New Guinea) Gairo Kapana	5

Points scored
Rank	Player	Points
1	(Wales) Luke Morgan	40
	(United States) Perry Baker	40
	(South Africa) Seabelo Senatla	40
	(New Zealand) Vilimoni Koroi	40
5	(United States) Folau Niua	35

Source: World Rugby

=== Dream Team ===
The following seven players were selected to the tournament Dream Team at the conclusion of the tournament:

Forwards	Backs
(New Zealand) Scott Curry (Fiji) Kalione Nasoko (Australia) Lachie Anderson	(Fiji) Jerry Tuwai (New Zealand) Vilimoni Koroi (South Africa) Werner Kok (Fiji) Eroni Sau

World Sevens Series XIX
Preceded by 2018 Sydney Sevens	2018 New Zealand Sevens	Succeeded by 2018 USA Sevens
New Zealand Sevens
Preceded by 2017 Wellington Sevens	2018 New Zealand Sevens	Succeeded by 2019 New Zealand Sevens
