= 2018 USA Sevens =

- 2017–18 World Series
- Host nation: United States
- Date: 2–4 March 2018

Cup
- Champion: United States
- Runner-up: Argentina
- Third: Fiji

Tournament details
- Matches played: 45
- Tries scored: 262 (average 5.82 per match)
- Most points: (Canada) Nathan Hirayama (45)
- Most tries: (United States) Perry Baker (8)

The 2018 USA Sevens (also sometimes referred to as the 2018 Las Vegas Sevens) was the fifteenth edition of the USA Sevens tournament, and the sixth tournament of the 2017–18 World Rugby Sevens Series. The tournament was played between 2 and 4 March 2018 at Sam Boyd Stadium in Las Vegas, Nevada.

The tournament was won by the United States who beat Argentina 28–0 in the final. This was the first time that the United States won its home tournament. USA's Perry Baker led the tournament with 8 tries and 11 breaks.

== Format ==
The teams were drawn into four pools of four teams each, with each team playing every other team in their pool once. The top two teams from each pool advanced to the Cup/5th place brackets. The bottom two teams from each group went to the Challenge trophy/13th place brackets.

== Teams ==
Fifteen core teams participated in the tournament along with one invited team, the highest-placing non-core team of the 2018 Sudamérica Rugby Sevens, Uruguay:

- Argentina
- Australia
- Canada
- England
- Fiji
- France
- Kenya
- New Zealand
- Russia
- Samoa
- Scotland
- South Africa
- Spain
- United States
- Uruguay
- Wales

== Pool stage ==
All times in Pacific Standard Time (UTC−08:00). The pools were scheduled as follows:

=== Pool A ===
Team	Pld	W	D	L	PF	PA	PD	Pts
Fiji	3	2	0	1	85	22	+63	7
Kenya	3	2	0	1	50	45	+5	7
France	3	2	0	1	55	54	+1	7
Russia	3	0	0	3	19	88	–69	3

2 March 2018	Kenya	14–19	France	Sam Boyd Stadium, Las Vegas
15:44	Try: Oliech 7'; Ambaka 8'; Con: Oliech (2/2) 8'		Try: Bonnefond 1'; Valleau 3', 10'; Con: Barraque (2/3) 1', 10'	Referee: (Portugal) Paulo Duarte

2 March 2018	Fiji	38–0	Russia	Sam Boyd Stadium, Las Vegas
16:06	Try: Vakurunabili 1'; Sau 5', 10'; Nasilasila 7'; Tuwai 8'; Ravouvou 14'; Con: Nasilasila (3/5) 5', 7', 8'; Ravouvou (1/1) 14'			Referee: (France) Jérémy Rozier

2 March 2018	Kenya	19–12	Russia	Sam Boyd Stadium, Las Vegas
18:45	Try: Oluoch 1'; Injera 7', 11'; Con: Agero (2/3) 7', 11'		Try: Ovchinnikov 7'; Davydov 9'; Con: Ianiushkin (1/2) 9'; Cards: Khodin (yellow card) 14' to 14'	Referee: (United States) Mike O'Brien

2 March 2018	Fiji	33–5	France	Sam Boyd Stadium, Las Vegas
19:07	Try: Nasoko 1'; Vakurunabili 3', 8'; Kunavula 12'; Mocenacagi 14'; Con: Nasilasila (2/3) 3', 8'; Ravouvou (2/2) 13', 14'		Try: Lakafia 5'; Con: Barraque (0/1); Cards: Laugel (yellow card) 14' to 14'	Referee: (Australia) Damian Schneider

3 March 2018	France	31–7	Russia	Sam Boyd Stadium, Las Vegas
12:14	Try: Barraque 7', 11'; Lakafia 9'; Penalty Try 12'; Villiere 13'; Con: Rivs (1/2) 7'; Barraque (1/2) 11'		Try: Gostyuzhev 5'; Con: Ianiushkin (1/1) 6'; Cards: Davydov (yellow card) 12' to 14'	Referee: (New Zealand) James Doleman

3 March 2018	Fiji	14–17	Kenya	Sam Boyd Stadium, Las Vegas
12:36	Try: Dranisinukula 4'; Naduva 13'; Con: Nasilasila (1/1) 5'; Kunavula (1/1) 13'; Cards: Ravouvou (yellow card) 10' to 12'		Try: Injera 7'; Ambaka 11'; Amonde 14'; Con: Agero (1/2) 7'; Injera (0/1)	Referee: (Australia) Damon Murphy

=== Pool B ===
Team	Pld	W	D	L	PF	PA	PD	Pts
South Africa	3	3	0	0	69	52	+17	9
England	3	2	0	1	92	48	+44	7
Canada	3	1	0	2	45	78	–33	5
Wales	3	0	0	3	52	80	–28	3

2 March 2018	England	40–12	Canada	Sam Boyd Stadium, Las Vegas
17:12	Try: Burgess 1' de Carpentier 4', 9'; Lindsay-Hague 7'; Bowen 12'; Mitchell 14'; Con: Mitchell (5/6) 1', 5', 7', 10', 14'		Try: Hirayama 3'; Jones 6'; Con: Hirayama (1/2) 2'	Referee: (Australia) Damon Murphy

2 March 2018	South Africa	26–21	Wales	Sam Boyd Stadium, Las Vegas
17:34	Try: Sage 5'; Du Preez 6'; Soyizwapi 7', 14'; Con: Du Preez (3/4) 5', 6', 7'; Cards: Brown (yellow card) 9' to 11'		Try: Morgan 1', 3'; Millard 8'; Con: O'Brien (3/3) 1', 3', 8'; Cards: Thomas (yellow card) 5' to 7'	Referee: (Argentina) Damien Schneider

2 March 2018	England	33–12	Wales	Sam Boyd Stadium, Las Vegas
20:13	Try: Bowen 1', 4', 6'; Mitchell 10'; Norton 14'; Con: Mitchell (4/4) 1, 5', 6', 14'; Bibby (0/1)		Try: Roach 3'; Morgan 8'; Con: O'Brien (1/2) 8'	Referee: (New Zealand) James Doleman

2 March 2018	South Africa	19–12	Canada	Sam Boyd Stadium, Las Vegas
20:35	Try: Soyizwapi 1'; Afrika 2'; Sage 9'; Con: Du Preez (2/3) 1' 3'		Try: Campbell 7'; Moonlight 8'; Con: Hirayama (1/2) 8'	Referee: (New Zealand) Richard Kelly

3 March 2018	Canada	21–19	Wales	Sam Boyd Stadium, Las Vegas
13:48	Try: Braid 1'; Hirayama 2'; Douglas 9'; Con: Hirayama (2/2) 1', 2' ,9'		Try: Thomas 4'; Roach 7'; Morgan 8'; Con: O'Brien (2/3) 5', 8'; Cards: Thomas (yellow card) 12' to 14'; Jenkins (yellow card) 14' to 14'	Referee: (France) Jérémy Rozier

3 March 2018	South Africa	24–19	England	Sam Boyd Stadium, Las Vegas
14:10	Try: Soyizwapi 1', 6'; Afrika 2'; Snyman 11'; Con: Du Preez (2/3) 1', 2'		Try: Mitchell 3'; Bibby 7', 13'; Con: Mitchell (1/2) 7'; Bibby (1/1) 13'	Referee: (Wales)

=== Pool C ===
Team	Pld	W	D	L	PF	PA	PD	Pts
United States	3	3	0	0	82	36	+46	9
Australia	3	2	0	1	55	35	+20	7
Samoa	3	1	0	2	48	64	–16	5
Spain	3	0	0	3	31	81	–50	3

2 March 2018	Samoa	12–26	United States	Sam Boyd Stadium, Las Vegas
16:28	Try: Afamasaga 2'; Alosio 14'; Con: Mealoi (1/1) 3'; Tupuo (0/1); Cards: Langkilde (yellow card) 8' (red card) 14'		Try: Barrett 1', 7'; Iosefo 5'; Pinkelman 12'; Con: Niua (3/4) 5', 7', 13'	Referee: (Australia) Jordan Way

2 March 2018	Australia	24–0	Spain	Sam Boyd Stadium, Las Vegas
16:50	Try: O'Donnell 2', 8'; Stannard 7'; Lucas 11'; Con: Stannard (2/4) 7', 11'			Referee: (New Zealand) James Doleman

2 March 2018	Samoa	29–14	Spain	Sam Boyd Stadium, Las Vegas
19:29	Try: Perez 1'; Whitaker 4'; Afamasaga 7', 10'; Tupou 8'; Con: Mealoi (2/4) 1', 7'		Try: Carter 6'; Pearce 13'; Con: Genua (1/1) 6'; Hernandez 14'	Referee: (France) Jérémy Rozier

2 March 2018	Australia	7–28	United States	Sam Boyd Stadium, Las Vegas
19:51	Try: Pietsch 12'; Con: Lucas (1/1) 13'		Try: Baker 1', 8'; Iosefo 2', 7'; Con: Niua (4/4) 1, 3', 7', 8'	Referee: (South Africa) Craig Joubert

3 March 2018	United States	28–17	Spain	Sam Boyd Stadium, Las Vegas
13:04	Try: Niua 1'; Schroeder 4'; Unufe 7'; Isles 11'; Con: Niua (2/2) 1', 4', 7'; Isles (1/1) 12'		Try: Taylor 6'; Hernandez 7'; Villanueva 14'; Con: Hernandez (1/3) 7'	Referee: (Portugal) Paulo Duarte

3 March 2018	Australia	24–7	Samoa	Sam Boyd Stadium, Las Vegas
13:26	Try: Parahi 7'; Porch 9' Anderson 11'; Stannard 13'; Con: Stannard (2/4) 7', 14'		Try: Leilua 12'; Con: Alosio (1/1) 13'	Referee: (New Zealand) Richard Kelly

=== Pool D ===
Team	Pld	W	D	L	PF	PA	PD	Pts
Argentina	3	3	0	0	78	38	+40	9
New Zealand	3	2	0	1	73	50	+23	7
Scotland	3	1	0	2	76	61	+15	5
Uruguay	3	0	0	3	21	99	–78	3

2 March 2018	Scotland	19–21	Argentina	Sam Boyd Stadium, Las Vegas
15:00	Try: McFarland 5' McLennan 10'; Farndale 11'; Con: Lowe (2/3) 5', 10'		Try: Osadczuk 1', 5' del Mestre 8'; Con: Revol (3/3) 1', 5', 8'	Referee: (New Zealand) Richard Kelly

2 March 2018	New Zealand	28–7	Uruguay	Sam Boyd Stadium, Las Vegas
15:22	Try: Ware 2', 12'; Mikkelson 8'; Ravouvou 14'; Con: Koroi (3/3) 2', 8', 12'; Knewstubb (1/1) 14'		Try: Ardao 5'; Con: Lijtenstein (1/1) 5'; Cards: Plottier (yellow card) 11' to 13'	Referee: (United States) Mike O'Brien

2 March 2018	Scotland	40–14	Uruguay	Sam Boyd Stadium, Las Vegas
18:01	Try: Graham 1'; Farndale 5'; McLennan 9'; McFarland 11'; Fleming 13'; Lowe 14'; Con: Lowe (5/6) 1', 10', 12', 13', 14'		Try: Lijtenstein 7'; Ardao 8'; Con: Lijtenstein (2/2) 7', 8'	Referee: (Portugal) Paulo Duarte

2 March 2018	New Zealand	19–26	Argentina	Sam Boyd Stadium, Las Vegas
18:23	Try: Molia 3'; Ravouvou 8'; Nanai-Seturo 12'; Con: Koroi (1/2) 8'; Curry 12' (1/1)		Try: Revol 1'; Barbier 5'; Bazan Velez 9'; Gonzalez 14'; Con: Revol (3/3) 2', 6', 10' del Mestre (0/1)	Referee: (Wales) Craig Evans

3 March 2018	Argentina	31–0	Uruguay	Sam Boyd Stadium, Las Vegas
11:30	Try: Gonzalez 2'; Bazan Velez 7'; Moroni 9'; Escobio 11' de Mestre 14'; Con: Bazab Velez (2/4) 7', 11'; Revol (1/1) 14'		Cards: Puig (yellow card) 12' to 14'	Referee: (Australia) Jordan Way

3 March 2018	New Zealand	26–17	Scotland	Sam Boyd Stadium, Las Vegas
11:52	Try: Molia 1'; Ware 6', 7'; Dickson 14'; Con: Knewstubb (3/4) 2', 7', 7'		Try: Farndale 3'; Nayacavou 4'; Godsmark 14'; Con: Lowe (1/3) 14'	Referee: (Argentina) Damien Schneider

== Knockout stage ==
=== 13th Place ===
Semi-finals
4 March 2018 – 11:00 – Sam Boyd Stadium
Uruguay	12
Samoa	26
4 March 2018 – 11:22 – Sam Boyd Stadium
Russia	17
Spain	19

13th Place Final
4 March 2018 – 13:56 – Sam Boyd Stadium
Samoa	28
Spain	7

Matches

Semi-finals

4 March 2018	Uruguay	12–26	Samoa	Sam Boyd Stadium, Las Vegas
11:00	Try: Etcheverry 4'; Ardao 7'; Con: Lijtenstein (1/2) 5'; Cards: Etcheverry (yellow card) 8' to 10'		Try: Tupuo 2', 12'; Leilual 6'; Perez 14'; Con: Mealoi (2/3) 2', 13'; Leilual (1/1) 6'; Cards: Alosio (yellow card) 3' to 5'	Referee: (France) Jérémy Rozier

4 March 2018	Russia	17–19	Spain	Sam Boyd Stadium, Las Vegas
11:22	Try: Zhivatov 2'; Davydov 6', 14'; Con: Ianiushkin (1/3) 6'		Try: Hernandez 4'; Rodriguez-Guerra 10'; J. Martin 12'; Con: Hernandez (1/2) 4'; Genua 12'	Referee: (New Zealand) James Doleman

13th Place Final

4 March 2018	Samoa	28–7	Spain	Sam Boyd Stadium, Las Vegas
13:56	Try: Afamasaga 1'; Alofipo 4', 10'; Perez 12'; Con: Paulo (3/3) 1', 4', 11'; Alosio 12'		Try: Sainz-Trapaga 13'; Con: Hernandez (1/1) 13'; Cards: Pearce (yellow card) 1' to 3'	Referee: (Portugal) Paulo Duarte

=== Challenge Trophy ===
Quarter-finals
3 March 2018 – 15:48 – Sam Boyd Stadium
France	40
Uruguay	7
3 March 2018 – 16:10 – Sam Boyd Stadium
Samoa	19
Wales	21
3 March 2018 – 16:32 – Sam Boyd Stadium
Scotland	24
Russia	12
3 March 2018 – 16:54 – Sam Boyd Stadium
Canada	21
Spain	14

Semi-finals
4 March 2018 – 11:44 – Sam Boyd Stadium
France	33
Wales	7
4 March 2018 – 12:06 – Sam Boyd Stadium
Scotland	12
Canada	15

Challenge Trophy Final
4 March 2018 – 15:10 – Sam Boyd Stadium
France	26
Canada	19

Matches

Quarter-finals

3 March 2018	France	40–7	Uruguay	Sam Boyd Stadium, Las Vegas
15:48	Try: Veredamu 3'; Villiere 6'; Bonnefond 7'; Lafakia 9', 13'; Sayerse 14'; Con: Barraque (1/1) 3', 6', 7', 9'; Mazzoleni (1/2) 14'		Try: Alonso 14'; Con: Lijtenstein (1/1) 14'	Referee: (United States) Mike O'Brien

3 March 2018	Scotland	24–5	Russia	Sam Boyd Stadium, Las Vegas
16:10	Try: Graham 3'; Nayacavou 5'; Godsmark 9'; Fergusson 11'; Con: Lowe (2/4) 9' 11'		Try: Davydov 7', 14'; Con: Sukhin (1/1) 14' Solomyannyy (0/1); Cards: Zhivatov (yellow card) 3' to 5'	Referee: (Portugal) Paulo Duarte

3 March 2018	Samoa	19–21	Wales	Sam Boyd Stadium, Las Vegas
16:32	Try: Fomai 1'; Tupou 9'; Alofipo 11'; Con: Mealoi (1/1) 9'; Tupou (1/1) 11'; Paulo (0/1); Cards: Paulo (yellow card) 5' to 7'		Try: Morgan 3', 5', 7'; Con: O'Brien (1/1) 3', 5', 7'	Referee: (Wales) Jordan Way

3 March 2018	Canada	21–14	Spain	Sam Boyd Stadium, Las Vegas
16:54	Try: Hirayama 5', 11'; Moonlight 7'; Con: Hirayama (2/2) 6', 7', 11'		Try: Fontes 9'; Villanueva 13'; Con: Hernandez (1/1) 9'; Genua (1/1) 13'	Referee: (Argentina) Damien Schneider

Semi-finals

4 March 2018	France	33–7	Wales	Sam Boyd Stadium, Las Vegas
11:44	Try: Veredamu 6'; Riva 7'; Villiere 9'; Bonnefond 12'; Laugel 14'; Con: Riva (2/3) 7', 12'; Mazzoleni (1/1) 9'; Barraque 14'		Try: Millard 10'; Con: O'Brien (1/1) 11'	Referee: (Argentina) Damien Schneider

4 March 2018	Scotland	12–15	Canada	Sam Boyd Stadium, Las Vegas
12:06	Try: Lowe 6'; McLennan 8'; Con: Lowe (1/2) 8'; Cards: Riddell (yellow card) 3' to 5'		Try: Douglas 4', 13'; Con: Hirayama (1/2) 4'; Pen: Hirayama (1/1) 14'	Referee: (United States) Mike O'Brien

Challenge Trophy Final

4 March 2018	France	26–19	Canada	Sam Boyd Stadium, Las Vegas
15:10	Try: Laugel 3'; Sayerse 4'; Barraque 7', 14'; Con: Mazzoleni (1/1) 3'; Barraque (2/3) 5', 14'; Cards: Veredamu (yellow card) 2' (red card) 6'		Try: Kay 6'; Campbell 10', 13'; Con: Hirayama (2/3) 6', 13'	Referee: (New Zealand) James Doleman

=== 5th Place ===
Semi-finals
4 March 2018 – 12:28 – Sam Boyd Stadium
New Zealand	19
England	14
4 March 2018 – 12:50 – Sam Boyd Stadium
Kenya	21
Australia	26 (a.e.t.)

5th Place Final
4 March 2018 – 15:35 – Sam Boyd Stadium
New Zealand	17 (a.e.t.)
Australia	12

Matches

Semi-finals

4 March 2018	New Zealand	19–14	England	Sam Boyd Stadium, Las Vegas
12:28	Try: McGarvey-Black 3', 8'; Collier 14'; Con: Knewstubb (1/1) 3', 8'; Koroi (0/1); Cards: Dickson (yellow card) 10' to 12'		Try: McConnochie 4'; Norton 10'; Con: Mitchell (1/1) 4', 10'	Referee: (Australia) Jordan Way

4 March 2018	Kenya	21–26 (a.e.t.)	Australia	Sam Boyd Stadium, Las Vegas
12:50	Try: Oluoch 3'; Odhiambo 7'; Ambaka 11'; Con: Agero (3/3) 3', 7', 12'		Try: Stannard 1', 15'; Porch 6'; Anderson 8'; Con: Stannard (1/1) 1'; Lucas (2/2) 7', 8'	Referee: (Portugal) Paulo Duarte

5th Place Final

4 March 2018	New Zealand	17–12 (a.e.t.)	Australia	Sam Boyd Stadium, Las Vegas
15:35	Try: Koroi 4'; Dickson 13'; Molia 18'; Con: Knewstubb (1/1) 4'		Try: Stannard 2'; Stannard 14'; Con: Stannard (1/2) 3'	Referee: (Wales) Craig Evans

=== Cup ===
Quarter-finals
3 March 2018 – 17:26 – Sam Boyd Stadium
Fiji	14
New Zealand	10
3 March 2018 – 17:48 – Sam Boyd Stadium
United States	17
England	12
3 March 2018 – 18:10 – Sam Boyd Stadium
Argentina	17
Kenya	12
3 March 2018 – 18:32 – Sam Boyd Stadium
South Africa	29
Australia	17

Semi-finals
4 March 2018 – 13:12 – Sam Boyd Stadium
Fiji	7
United States	19
4 March 2018 – 13:34 – Sam Boyd Stadium
Argentina	12
South Africa	10

Cup Final
4 March 2018 – 16:30 – Sam Boyd Stadium
United States	28
Argentina	0
Bronze Medal Match
4 March 2018 – 16:00 – Sam Boyd Stadium
Fiji	26
South Africa	22

Matches

Quarter-finals

3 March 2018	Fiji	14–10	New Zealand	Sam Boyd Stadium, Las Vegas
17:26	Try: Ravouvou 2'; Tuwai 14'; Con: Ravouvou (1/1) 2'; Naduva 14'		Try: Koroi 4'; Molia 7'; Con: Knewstubb (0/2)	Referee: (South Africa) Craig Joubert

3 March 2018	United States	17–12	England	Sam Boyd Stadium, Las Vegas
17:48	Try: Baker 3', 5', 8; Con: Niua (1/3) 6'		Try: Lindsay-Hague 7'; Norton 10'; Con: Mitchell (1/2) 10'	Referee: (New Zealand) James Doleman

3 March 2018	Argentina	17–12	Kenya	Sam Boyd Stadium, Las Vegas
18:10	Try: Roura 3' del Mestre 7'; Barbier 11'; Con: Revol (1/3) 3'		Try: Oyoo 5'; Ambaka 8'; Con: Agero (1/2) 6'	Referee: (Wales) Craig Evans

3 March 2018	South Africa	29–17	Australia	Sam Boyd Stadium, Las Vegas
18:32	Try: Snyman 3'; Oosthuizen 7'; Afrika 8'; Nel 10'; Davids 13'; Con: Du Preez (1/1) 4'; Afrika (1/3) 8'; Nel (0/1); Cards: Sage (yellow card) 14' to 14'		Try: Porch 1', 6'; Skelton 14'; Con: Stannard (1/3) 2'	Referee: (France) Jérémy Rozier

Semi-finals

4 March 2018	Fiji	7–19	United States	Sam Boyd Stadium, Las Vegas
13:12	Try: Mocenacagi 5'; Con: Ravouvou (1/1) 5'; Cards: Naduva (yellow card) 11' to 13'		Try: Baker 8', 13'; Leuta 11'; Con: Niua (2/3) 9', 12'	Referee: (New Zealand) Richard Kelly

4 March 2018	Argentina	12–10	South Africa	Sam Boyd Stadium, Las Vegas
13:34	Try: Osadczuk 4'; Barbier 14'; Con: Revol (1/2) 5'		Try: Soyizwapi 1', 11'; Con: Du Preez (0/2)	Referee: (Australia) Damon Murphy

Bronze Medal Match

4 March 2018	Fiji	26–22	South Africa	Sam Boyd Stadium, Las Vegas
16:00	Try: Tuwai 1', 7'; Dranisinukula 5'; Naduva 11'; Con: Ravouvou (2/3) 5', 7', 12'; Cards: Mocenacagi (yellow card) 6' to 8'		Try: Nel 2', 9'; Oosthuizen 8'; Davids 13'; Con: Davids (1/1) 13'; Afrika (0/3); Cards: Soyizwapi (yellow card) 4' to 6'	Referee: (France) Jérémy Rozier

Cup Final

4 March 2018	United States *	28–0	Argentina	Sam Boyd Stadium, Las Vegas
16:30	Try: Baker 3'; Barrett 7', 8'; Isles 14'; Con: Niua (1/1) 3', 7', 8', 14'			Referee: (New Zealand) Richard Kelly

Note: *1st USA Sevens Title

== Tournament placings ==
Place	Team	Points
1st place, gold medalist(s)	United States	22
2nd place, silver medalist(s)	Argentina	19
3rd place, bronze medalist(s)	Fiji	17
4	South Africa	15
5	New Zealand	13
6	Australia	12
7	England	10
7	Kenya	10
9	France	8
10	Canada	7
11	Scotland	5
11	Wales	5
13	Samoa	3
14	Spain	2
15	Russia	1
15	Uruguay	1

Source: World Rugby

== Players ==
=== Scoring leaders ===
Tries scored
Rank	Player	Tries
1	(United States) Perry Baker	8
2	(Wales) Luke Morgan	7
	(South Africa) Siviwe Soyizwapi	7
4	(Russia) German Davydov	5
	(Australia) James Stannard	5

Points scored
Rank	Player	Points
1	(Canada) Nathan Hirayama	45
2	(England) Tom Mitchell	41
3	(France) Jean-Pascal Barraque	40
	(United States) Perry Baker	40
5	(United States) Folau Niua	39

Source: World Rugby

=== Dream Team ===
The following seven players were selected to the tournament Dream Team at the conclusion of the tournament:

Forwards	Backs
(United States) Ben Pinkelman (United States) Danny Barrett (Argentina) Matias Osadczuk	(South Africa) Cecil Afrika (Fiji) Jerry Tuwai (Wales) Luke Morgan (United States) Perry Baker

World Sevens Series XIX
Preceded by 2018 New Zealand Sevens	2018 USA Sevens	Succeeded by 2018 Canada Sevens
USA Sevens
Preceded by 2017 USA Sevens	2018 USA Sevens	Succeeded by 2019 USA Sevens
