= 2018 Rugby World Cup Sevens – Men's tournament =

Tournament details
- Venue: AT&T Park
- Dates: 20 – 22 July
- No. of nations: 24

Final positions
- Champions: New Zealand
- Runner-up: England

Tournament statistics
- Matches played: 52
- Tries scored: 344 (average 6.62 per match)
- Top scorer(s): Emmanuel Guise (37)
- Most tries: Joe Ravouvou (6); Siviwe Soyizwapi (6)

The men's tournament in the 2018 Rugby World Cup Sevens was held at AT&T Park in San Francisco. New Zealand won the tournament and took home the Melrose Cup by defeating England 33–12 in the final; South Africa won the bronze by defeating Fiji 24–19. The tournament was dominated by the World Series core teams, which accounted for all eight of the teams that reached the quarterfinals. Ireland was the highest placed non core team in ninth, notching wins against core teams Kenya, Wales, and Australia.

The top point scorer was Papua New Guinea's Emmanuel Guise with 37 points. The joint top try scorers were New Zealand's Joe Ravouvou and South Africa's Siviwe Soyizwapi with 6 each.

== Format ==
Unlike previous editions, the tournament will be played for the first time in a knock-out only format.

- Teams in the Championship Cup will compete for the Melrose Cup and bronze medals.
- Losing teams in the Championship Cup Quarter-finals will compete for 5th Place.
- Losing teams in the Championship Cup Round of 16 (second round) will compete for the Challenge Trophy.
- Losing teams in the Championship Cup Pre-round of 16 (first round) will compete for the Bowl.
- Losing teams in the Challenge Trophy Quarter-finals will compete for 13th Place.
- Losing teams in the Bowl Quarter-finals will compete for 21st Place.
- Teams entering in the Pre-round of 16 (first round) in the Championship Cup will play a minimum of four matches and a maximum of five matches.
- Teams entering in the Round of 16 (second round) in the Championship Cup will play four matches.

== Teams ==
| Africa | North America | South America | Asia | Europe | Oceania |
Automatic qualification
| Kenya; South Africa | United States | | | England; France; Wales | Australia; Fiji; New Zealand |
2016–17 World Series
| | Canada | Argentina | | Scotland | Samoa |
Regional Qualifiers
| Uganda; Zimbabwe | Jamaica | Chile; Uruguay | Hong Kong; Japan | Ireland; Russia | Papua New Guinea; Tonga |

== Draw ==
The twenty-four teams are seeded as follows:

- The fourteen core teams of the 2017–18 World Rugby Sevens Series who qualified are ranked as the first fourteen teams. These teams are seeded according to combined rankings derived from the 2016–17 World Rugby Sevens Series, and the first seven rounds of the 2017–18 World Rugby Sevens Series.
- Places 15–24 are allocated to teams that qualified by way of the regional tournaments. These teams are seeded based on their rankings from the 2018 Hong Kong Sevens qualifier.
- Teams ranked 1-8 receive byes and enter the Championship Cup in the Round of 16 (second round).
- Teams ranked 9-24 enter the Championship Cup in the Pre-round of 16 (first round).

2017–18 Core Team Seeding
| Pos | Event Team | 2016–17 | Dubai | Cape Town | Sydney | Hamilton | Las Vegas | Vancouver | Hong Kong | Points total |
|---|---|---|---|---|---|---|---|---|---|---|
| 1 | South Africa | 192 | 22 | 17 | 19 | 19 | 15 | 17 | 17 | 318 |
| 2 | Fiji | 150 | 15 | 13 | 12 | 22 | 17 | 22 | 22 | 273 |
| 3 | New Zealand | 137 | 19 | 22 | 13 | 15 | 13 | 10 | 15 | 244 |
| 4 | England | 164 | 17 | 10 | 10 | 10 | 10 | 13 | 1 | 235 |
| 5 | United States | 129 | 1 | 12 | 15 | 8 | 22 | 15 | 12 | 214 |
| 6 | Australia | 113 | 13 | 8 | 22 | 17 | 12 | 12 | 5 | 202 |
| 7 | Argentina | 90 | 5 | 19 | 17 | 7 | 19 | 10 | 13 | 180 |
| 8 | Scotland | 109 | 10 | 1 | 2 | 10 | 5 | 8 | 10 | 155 |
| 9 | Kenya | 63 | 10 | 3 | 10 | 12 | 10 | 19 | 19 | 146 |
| 10 | Canada | 98 | 5 | 15 | 3 | 5 | 7 | 2 | 7 | 142 |
| 11 | France | 66 | 8 | 10 | 8 | 3 | 8 | 1 | 8 | 112 |
| 12 | Wales | 73 | 3 | 5 | 7 | 2 | 5 | 5 | 3 | 103 |
| 13 | Samoa | 51 | 12 | 5 | 5 | 13 | 3 | 3 | 2 | 94 |
| 14 | Russia | 29 | 1 | 1 | 5 | 1 | 1 | 5 | 5 | 48 |

2018 Hong Kong Sevens seeding
| Pos | Team | Round | Group Rank | Record | PD |
|---|---|---|---|---|---|
| 15 | Japan | Champion | 2 | 5–1 | +130 |
| 16 | Ireland | Semifinal | 1 | 4–1 | +126 |
| 17 | Chile | Semifinal | 1 | 3–2 | +34 |
| 18 | Uruguay | Quarterfinal | 2 | 2–2 | +12 |
| 19 | Hong Kong | Quarterfinal | 2 | 1–3 | –10 |
| 20 | Uganda | Quarterfinal | 3 | 2–2 | –20 |
| 21 | Zimbabwe | Quarterfinal | 3 | 1–3 | –42 |
| 22 | Jamaica | Pool stage | 3 | 1–2 | –41 |
| 23 | Papua New Guinea | Pool stage | 4 | 1–2 | –35 |
| 24 | Tonga | N/A | | | |

== Match officials ==
World Rugby announced a panel of ten match officials for the men's tournament.

- Rasta Rasivhenge (South Africa)
- Richard Kelly (New Zealand)
- Craig Evans (Wales)
- Sam Grove-White (Scotland)
- Damon Murphy (Australia)
- Jérémy Rozier (France)
- Matt Rodden (Hong Kong)
- Richard Haughton (England)
- Damián Schneider (Argentina)
- Mike O'Brien (United States)

== Tournament ==
=== Pre-Round of 16 ===
| 20 July 2018 | (9) Kenya | 19–7 | Tonga (24) | AT&T Park |
| 13:01 | Try: Oyoo (2) 7'm, 9'c Injera 12'c Con: Oliech (1/1) 9'c Agero (1/2) 12' | | Try: Tokai 5'c Con: Muna (1/1) 6'; Cards: Tokai (yellow card) 7' | Referee: Matt Rodden (Hong Kong) |

| 20 July 2018 | (10) Canada | 29–21 | Papua New Guinea (23) | AT&T Park |
| 13:23 | Try: Jones 0'c Douglas (2) 3'c, 7'm Mullins 7'm Braid 14'c Con: Hirayama (2/5) 0', 4' | | Try: Tirang 4'c Kalua 10'c Peter 12'c Con: Guise (3/3) 5', 10', 12' | Referee: Sam Grove-White (Scotland) |

| 20 July 2018 | (11) France | 50–0 | Jamaica (22) | AT&T Park |
| 13:45 | Try: Veredamu 0'm Valleau (2) 2'c, 3'c Barraque (2) 6'c, 9'm Bouhraoua 8'm Boudehent 10'c Parez 13'c Con: Barraque (3/4) 3', 4', 6'; Riva (1/2) 11'; Parez (1/1) 14' | | | Referee: Mike O'Brien (United States) |

| 20 July 2018 | (12) Wales | 33–12 | Zimbabwe (21) | AT&T Park |
| 14:07 | Try: Rosser 5'c Morgan (2) 7'c, 8'c Roach 9'c Allen 13'c Con: Davies (3/3) 6', 7', 8'; Treharne (1/2) 9'; Cards: Chitokwindo 1'c Makombe 3'm | | Try: Rouse (1/2) 1' | Referee: Richard Haughton (England) |

| 20 July 2018 | (13) Samoa | 45–7 | Uganda (20) | AT&T Park |
| 14:29 | Try: Perez 0'c Fomai 3'c Tuatagaloa 5'm Motuga (2) 8'c, 13'c Leilual 10'c Solia 12'm Con: Tupou (4/5) 1', 3', 8', 10'; Paulo (1/2) 13' | | Try: Okorach 7'c Con: Wokorach (1/1) 7'; Cards: Okorach (yellow card) 2' | Referee: Craig Evans (Wales) |

| 20 July 2018 | (14) Russia | 21–7 | Hong Kong (19) | AT&T Park |
| 14:51 | Try: Ianiushkin (2) 2'c, 5'c Davydov 6'c Con: Gaisin (3/3) 3', 6', 7' | | Try: Herbert 14'c Con: Hood (1/1) 14' | Referee: Damián Schneider (Argentina) |

| 20 July 2018 | (15) Japan | 33–7 | Uruguay (18) | AT&T Park |
| 15:13 | Try: Lilidamu (2) 1'm, 5'c Tupou 4'c Sakai 7'c Soejima 13'c Con: Sakai (4/5) 4', 5', 7', 13' | | Try: Mieres 9'c Con: Lijtenstein 9' | Referee: Jérémy Rozier (France) |

| 20 July 2018 | (16) Ireland | 17–12 | Chile (17) | AT&T Park |
| 15:35 | Try: Keenan 3'c Dardis 6'm O'Brien 14'm Con: Dardis (1/3) 3' | | Try: P Verschae 1'c Metuaze 11'm Con: Torrealba (1/2) 1' | Referee: Richard Kelly (New Zealand) |

=== 21st Place ===
Semi-finals
22 July 2018 – 9:00 – AT&T Park
Tonga (24) | 31
Zimbabwe (21) | 5
22 July 2018 – 9:22 – AT&T Park
Papua New Guinea (23) | 52
Jamaica (22) | 7

21st Place Final
22 July 2018 – 13:46 – AT&T Park
Tonga (24) | 14
Papua New Guinea (23) | 31
23rd Place
22 July 2018 – 13:24 – AT&T Park
Zimbabwe (21) | 33
Jamaica (22) | 21

Matches

Semi-finals

| 22 July 2018 | (24) Tonga | 31–5 | Zimbabwe (21) | AT&T Park |
| 9:00 | Try: Kilioni 1'm Vahe 6'c Tokai 8'm Muna 13'c Vainikolo 14'c Con: Muna (3/5) 6', 13', 14' | | Try: Chitokwindo 11'm Con: Rouse (0/1); Cards: Madida (yellow card) 1' | Referee: Matt Rodden (Hong Kong) |

| 22 July 2018 | (23) Papua New Guinea | 52–7 | Jamaica (22) | AT&T Park |
| 9:22 | | | | Referee: Craig Evans (Wales) |

23rd Place

| 22 July 2018 | (21) Zimbabwe | 33–21 | Jamaica (22) | AT&T Park |
| 13:24 | | | | Referee: Damián Schneider (Argentina) |

21st Place Final

| 22 July 2018 | (24) Tonga | 14–31 | Papua New Guinea (23) | AT&T Park |
| 13:46 | | | | Referee: Jérémy Rozier (France) |

=== Bowl ===
Quarter-finals
21 July 2018 – 12:26 – AT&T Park
Tonga (24) | 29
Chile (17) | 33
21 July 2018 – 13:32 – AT&T Park
Zimbabwe (21) | 10
Uganda (20) | 24
21 July 2018 – 12:48 – AT&T Park
Papua New Guinea (23) | 19
Uruguay (18) | 21
21 July 2018 – 13:10 – AT&T Park
Jamaica (22) | 10
Hong Kong (19) | 24

Semi-finals
22 July 2018 – 9:44 – AT&T Park
Chile (17) | 20
Uganda (20) | 17
22 July 2018 – 10:06 – AT&T Park
Uruguay (18) | 5
Hong Kong (19) | 31

Bowl Final
22 July 2018 – 14:40 – AT&T Park
Chile (17) | 20
Hong Kong (19) | 7
19th Place
22 July 2018 – 14:18 – AT&T Park
Uganda (20) | 38
Uruguay (18) | 28

Matches

Quarter-finals

| 21 July 2018 | (24) Tonga | 29–33 | Chile (17) | AT&T Park |
| 12:26 | | | | Referee: Rasta Rasivhenge (South Africa) |

| 21 July 2018 | (23) Papua New Guinea | 19–21 | Uruguay (18) | AT&T Park |
| 12:48 | | | | Referee: Sam Grove-White (Scotland) |

| 21 July 2018 | (11) Jamaica | 10–24 | Hong Kong (19) | AT&T Park |
| 13:10 | | | | Referee: Mike O'Brien (United States) |

| 21 July 2018 | (21) Zimbabwe | 10–24 | Uganda (20) | AT&T Park |
| 13:32 | | | | Referee: Matt Rodden (Hong Kong) |

Semi-finals

| 22 July 2018 | (17) Chile | 20–17 | Uganda (20) | AT&T Park |
| 9:44 | | | | Referee: Rasta Rasivhenge (South Africa) |

| 22 July 2018 | (18) Uruguay | 5–31 | Hong Kong (19) | AT&T Park |
| 10:06 | | | | Referee: Richard Kelly (New Zealand) |

19th Place

| 22 July 2018 | (18) Uruguay | 28–38 | Uganda (20) | AT&T Park |
| 14:18 | | | | Referee: Matt Rodden (Hong Kong) |

Bowl Final

| 22 July 2018 | (17) Chile | 20–7 | Hong Kong (19) | AT&T Park |
| 14:40 | | | | Referee: Mike O'Brien (United States) |

=== 13th Place ===
Semi-finals
22 July 2018 – 10:28 – AT&T Park
Kenya (9) | 17
Samoa (13) | 19
22 July 2018 – 10:50 – AT&T Park
Japan (15) | 20
Russia (14) | 26

13th Place Final
22 July 2018 – 15:24 – AT&T Park
Samoa (13) | 22
Russia (14) | 17
15th Place
22 July 2018 – 15:02 – AT&T Park
Kenya (9) | 14
Japan (15) | 26

Matches

Semi-finals

| 22 July 2018 | (9) Kenya | 17–19 | Samoa (13) | AT&T Park |
| 10:28 | | | | Referee: Mike O'Brien (United States) |

| 22 July 2018 | (15) Japan | 20–26 | Russia (14) | AT&T Park |
| 10:50 | | | | Referee: Damián Schneider (Argentina) |

15th Place

| 22 July 2018 | (9) Kenya | 14–26 | Japan (15) | AT&T Park |
| 15:02 | | | | Referee: Richard Haughton (England) |

13th Place Final

| 22 July 2018 | (13) Samoa | 22–17 | Russia (14) | AT&T Park |
| 15:24 | | | | Referee: Matt Rodden (Hong Kong) |

=== Challenge Trophy ===
Quarter-finals
21 July 2018 – 14:04 – AT&T Park
Ireland (16) | 24
Kenya (9) | 14
21 July 2018 – 15:10 – AT&T Park
Samoa (13) | 19
Wales (12) | 24
21 July 2018 – 14:26 – AT&T Park
Japan (15) | 17
Canada (10) | 35
21 July 2018 – 14:48 – AT&T Park
Russia (14) | 0
Australia (6) | 41

Semi-finals
22 July 2018 – 11:12 – AT&T Park
Ireland (16) | 27
Wales (12) | 12
22 July 2018 – 11:34 – AT&T Park
Canada (10) | 7
Australia (6) | 19

Challenge Trophy Final
22 July 2018 – 16:08 – AT&T Park
Ireland (16) | 24
Australia (6) | 14
11th Place
22 July 2018 – 15:46 – AT&T Park
Wales (12) | 35
Canada (10) | 12

Matches

Quarter-finals

| 21 July 2018 | (9) Kenya | 14–24 | Ireland (16) | AT&T Park |
| 14:04 | | | | Referee: Richard Haughton (England) |

| 21 July 2018 | (10) Canada | 35–17 | Japan (15) | AT&T Park |
| 14:26 | | | | Referee: Damon Murphy (Australia) |

| 21 July 2018 | (6) Australia | 41–0 | Russia (14) | AT&T Park |
| 14:48 | | | | Referee: Jérémy Rozier (France) |

| 21 July 2018 | (12) Wales | 24–19 | Samoa (13) | AT&T Park |
| 15:10 | | | | Referee: Damián Schneider (Argentina) |

Semi-finals

| 22 July 2018 | (16) Ireland | 27–12 | Wales (12) | AT&T Park |
| 11:12 | | | | Referee: Damon Murphy (Australia) |

| 22 July 2018 | (10) Canada | 7–19 | Australia (6) | AT&T Park |
| 11:34 | | | | Referee: Sam Grove-White (Scotland) |

11th Place

| 22 July 2018 | (12) Wales | 35–12 | Canada (10) | AT&T Park |
| 15:46 | | | | Referee: Damon Murphy (Australia) |

Challenge Trophy Final

| 22 July 2018 | (16) Ireland | 24–14 | Australia (6) | AT&T Park |
| 16:08 | | | | Referee: Jérémy Rozier (France) |

=== 5th Place ===
Semi-finals
22 July 2018 – 11:56 – AT&T Park
Scotland (8) | 0
United States (5) | 28
22 July 2018 – 12:18 – AT&T Park
Argentina (7) | 26
France (11) | 15

5th Place Final
22 July 2018 – 17:02 – AT&T Park
United States (5) | 7
Argentina (7) | 33
7th Place
22 July 2018 – 16:40 – AT&T Park
Scotland (8) (a.e.t.) | 29
France (11) | 24

Matches

Semi-finals

| 22 July 2018 | (8) Scotland | 0–28 | United States (5) | AT&T Park |
| 11:56 | | | | Referee: Jérémy Rozier (France) |

| 22 July 2018 | (7) Argentina | 26–15 | France (11) | AT&T Park |
| 12:18 | | | | Referee: Richard Haughton (England) |

7th Place

| 22 July 2018 | (8) Scotland | 29–24 (a.e.t.) | France (11) | AT&T Park |
| 16:40 | | | | Referee: Craig Evans (Wales) |

5th Place Final

| 22 July 2018 | (5) United States | 7–33 | Argentina (7) | AT&T Park |
| 17:02 | | | | Referee: Sam Grove-White (Scotland) |

=== Championship ===
Round of 16
20 July 2018 – 21:15 – AT&T Park
South Africa (1) | 45
Ireland (16) | 7
20 July 2018 – 19:03 – AT&T Park
Scotland (8) | 31
Kenya (9) | 26
20 July 2018 – 20:09 – AT&T Park
England (4) | 19
Samoa (13) | 15
20 July 2018 – 21:37 – AT&T Park
United States (5) | 35
Wales (12) | 0
20 July 2018 – 20:53 – AT&T Park
Fiji (2) | 35
Japan (15) | 10
20 July 2018 – 19:25 – AT&T Park
Argentina (7) | 28
Canada (10) | 0
20 July 2018 – 20:31 – AT&T Park
New Zealand (3) | 29
Russia (14) | 5
20 July 2018 – 19:47 – AT&T Park
Australia (6) | 17
France (11) | 22

Quarter-finals
21 July 2018 – 15:32 – AT&T Park
South Africa (1) | 36
Scotland (8) | 5
21 July 2018 – 16:38 – AT&T Park
England (4) (a.e.t.) | 24
United States (5) | 19
21 July 2018 – 15:54 – AT&T Park
Fiji (2) | 43
Argentina (7) | 7
21 July 2018 – 16:16 – AT&T Park
New Zealand (3) | 12
France (11) | 7

Semi-finals
22 July 2018 – 12:40 – AT&T Park
South Africa (1) | 7
England (4) | 29
22 July 2018 – 13:02 – AT&T Park
Fiji (2) | 17
New Zealand (3) | 22

Championship Final
22 July 2018 – 17:46 – AT&T Park
England (4) | 12
New Zealand (3) | 33
Bronze Medal Match
22 July 2018 – 17:24 – AT&T Park
South Africa (1) | 24
Fiji (2) | 19

Matches

Round of 16

| 20 July 2018 | (8) Scotland | 31–26 | Kenya (9) | AT&T Park |
| 19:03 | | | | Referee: Craig Evans (Wales) |

| 20 July 2018 | (7) Argentina | 28–0 | Canada (10) | AT&T Park |
| 19:25 | | | | Referee: Richard Kelly (New Zealand) |

| 20 July 2018 | (6) Australia | 17–22 | France (11) | AT&T Park |
| 19:47 | | | | Referee: Sam Grove-White (Scotland) |

| 20 July 2018 | (4) England | 19–15 | Samoa (13) | AT&T Park |
| 20:09 | | | | Referee: Damon Murphy (Australia) |

| 20 July 2018 | (3) New Zealand | 29–5 | Russia (14) | AT&T Park |
| 20:31 | | | | Referee: Jérémy Rozier (France) |

| 20 July 2018 | (2) Fiji | 35–10 | Japan (15) | AT&T Park |
| 20:53 | | | | Referee: Damián Schneider (Argentina) |

| 20 July 2018 | (1) South Africa | 45–7 | Ireland (16) | AT&T Park |
| 21:15 | | | | Referee: Richard Haughton (England) |

| 20 July 2018 | (5) United States | 35–0 | Wales (12) | AT&T Park |
| 21:37 | | | | Referee: Rasta Rasivhenge (South Africa) |

Quarter-finals

| 21 July 2018 | (8) Scotland | 5–36 | South Africa (1) | AT&T Park |
| 15:32 | | | | Referee: Richard Kelly (New Zealand) |

| 21 July 2018 | (7) Argentina | 7–43 | Fiji (2) | AT&T Park |
| 15:54 | | | | Referee: Craig Evans (Wales) |

| 21 July 2018 | (11) France | 7–12 | New Zealand (3) | AT&T Park |
| 16:16 | | | | Referee: Sam Grove-White (Scotland) |

| 21 July 2018 | (5) United States | 19–24 | England (4) | AT&T Park |
| 16:38 | | | | Referee: Rasta Rasivhenge (South Africa) |

Semi-finals

| 22 July 2018 | (1) South Africa | 7–29 | England (4) | AT&T Park |
| 12:40 | | | | Referee: Craig Evans (Wales) |

| 22 July 2018 | (2) Fiji | 17–22 | New Zealand (3) | AT&T Park |
| 13:02 | | | | Referee: Rasta Rasivhenge (South Africa) |

Bronze Medal Match

| 22 July 2018 | (1) South Africa | 24–19 | Fiji (2) | AT&T Park |
| 17:24 | | | | Referee: Richard Kelly (New Zealand) |

Championship Final

| 22 July 2018 | (4) England | 12–33 | New Zealand (3) | AT&T Park |
| 17:46 | Try: Ellery 7'c McConnochie 12'm Con: Mitchell (1/2) 7' | Report | Try: Molia (2) 2'c, 5'c Ravouvou 10'm Rokolisoa 14'c Joass 14'c Con: Baker (3/4) 2', 5', 14'; Curry (1/1) 14' | Referee: Rasta Rasivhenge (South Africa) |

2018 Rugby World Cup Sevens Men's winners

New Zealand
3rd title

== Tournament placings ==
| Place | Team |
|---|---|
| 1st place, gold medalist(s) | New Zealand |
| 2nd place, silver medalist(s) | England |
| 3rd place, bronze medalist(s) | South Africa |
| 4 | Fiji |
| 5 | Argentina |
| 6 | United States |
| 7 | Scotland |
| 8 | France |
| 9 | Ireland |
| 10 | Australia |
| 11 | Wales |
| 12 | Canada |

| Place | Team |
|---|---|
| 13 | Samoa |
| 14 | Russia |
| 15 | Japan |
| 16 | Kenya |
| 17 | Chile |
| 18 | Hong Kong |
| 19 | Uganda |
| 20 | Uruguay |
| 21 | Papua New Guinea |
| 22 | Tonga |
| 23 | Zimbabwe |
| 24 | Jamaica |

== Attendance ==
Over 100,000 fans attended the three day event, which was a Rugby World Cup Sevens record until the 2022 tournament.

== Player scoring ==
Tries scored
| Rank | Player | Tries |
|---|---|---|
| 1 | Joe Ravouvou | 6 |
| 1 | Siviwe Soyizwapi | 6 |
| 3 | Justin Geduld | 5 |
| 3 | Luke Morgan | 5 |
| 5 | 14 players | 4 |

Points scored
| Rank | Player | Points |
|---|---|---|
| 1 | Emmanuel Guise | 37 |
| 2 | Billy Dardis | 32 |
| 2 | Madison Hughes | 32 |
| 4 | John Porch | 30 |
| 4 | Joe Ravouvou | 30 |
| 4 | Siviwe Soyizwapi | 30 |
| 4 | Philip Wokorach | 30 |

Source: World Rugby

== See also ==
- 2018 Rugby World Cup Sevens – Women's tournament
