= 2017 South Africa Sevens =

- Sevens World Series XIX
- Host nation: South Africa
- Date: 9–10 December 2017

Cup
- Champion: New Zealand
- Runner-up: Argentina
- Third: South Africa

Challenge Cup
- Winner: Australia

Tournament details
- Matches played: 45
- Tries scored: 271 (average 6.02 per match)
- Most points: (Canada) Nathan Hirayama (44)
- Most tries: (South Africa) Seabelo Senatla (7)

The 2017 South Africa Sevens was the second tournament within the 2017–18 World Rugby Sevens Series and the nineteenth edition of the South Africa Sevens. It was held over the weekend of 9–10 December 2017 at Cape Town Stadium in Cape Town, South Africa.

== Format ==
The teams were drawn into four pools of four teams each. Each team played every other team in their pool once. The top two teams from each pool advanced to the Cup brackets where teams competed for the Gold, Silver, and Bronze medals. The bottom two teams from each group went to the playoffs in the Challenge Trophy brackets.

== Teams ==
Fifteen core teams are participating in the tournament along with one invited team, the winner of the 2017 Africa Cup Sevens, Uganda:

- Argentina
- Australia
- Canada
- England
- Fiji
- France
- Kenya
- New Zealand
- Russia
- Samoa
- Scotland
- South Africa
- Spain
- Uganda
- United States
- Wales

== Pool stage ==
All times in South African Standard Time (UTC+2:00)

=== Pool A ===
Team	Pld	W	D	L	PF	PA	PD	Pts
South Africa	3	3	0	0	97	17	+80	9
France	3	2	0	1	47	50	–3	7
Kenya	3	1	0	2	55	47	+8	5
Russia	3	0	0	3	10	95	–85	3

9 December 2017	Kenya	14–21	France	Cape Town Stadium
12:27	Try: Oliech 4'; Tanga 7'; Con: Oliech (2/2) 5', 7'		Try: Mazoue 8'; Barraque 10'; Parez 11'; Con: Barraque (3/3) 8', 11', 12'; Cards: Daoudou (yellow card) 13' to 14'	Referee: (Argentina) Damian Schneider

9 December 2017	South Africa	40–5	Russia	Cape Town Stadium
12:49	Try: Senatla 1', 5', 7'; Du Preez 2'; Agaba 9'; Specman 11'; Con: Du Preez (3/4) 2', 6', 7'; Afrika (1/1) 10'; Geduld 11'		Try: Roschin 3'; Con: Roshchin (0/1)	Referee: (Wales) Craig Evans

9 December 2017	Kenya	34–0	Russia	Cape Town Stadium
15:48	Try: Tanga 1'; Oliech 4'; Ambaka 6'; Sikuta 8'; Ochieng 10'; Njenga 13'; Con: Oliech (2/6) 4', 14'			Referee: (South Africa) Rasta Rasivhenge

9 December 2017	South Africa	31–5	France	Cape Town Stadium
16:10	Try: Smith 2'; Snyman 9'; Dry 10'; Senatla 11'; Nel 14'; Con: Du Preez (2/2) 3', 9'; Afrika 10'; Geduld (1/2) 14'		Try: Parez 7'; Con: Mazzoleni (0/1); Cards: Mazzoleni (yellow card) 10' to 12'	Referee: (United States) Mike O'Brien

9 December 2017	France	21–5	Russia	Cape Town Stadium
19:34	Try: Veredamu 2'; Mazzoleni 3'; Riva 7'; Con: Riva (2/2) 2', 4'; Mazzoleni (1/1) 7'		Try: Kapalin 11'; Con: Gostyuzhev (0/1)	Referee: (Portugal) Paulo Duarte

9 December 2017	South Africa	26–7	Kenya	Cape Town Stadium
19:56	Try: Nel 4'; Brown 6'; Snyman 11'; Senatla 12'; Con: Du Preez (2/2) 4', 6'; Afrika (1/1) 11'; Geduld (0/1)		Try: Ambaka 5'; Con: Tanga (1/1) 5'; Cards: Oyoo (yellow card) 6' to 8'	Referee: (Scotland) Sam Grove-White

=== Pool B ===
Team	Pld	W	D	L	PF	PA	PD	Pts
United States	3	3	0	0	79	19	+60	9
New Zealand	3	2	0	1	85	34	+51	7
Australia	3	1	0	2	62	78	–16	5
Spain	3	0	0	3	17	112	–95	3

9 December 2017	Australia	36–12	Spain	Cape Town Stadium
11:43	Try: Anderson 1'; Kennewell 2', 4', 5'; Longbottom 9'; Hood 14'; Con: Holland (1/4) 2'; Stannard (2/2) 10', 14'		Try: Poggi 7'; Pla 13'; Con: Hernandez (1/2) 7'	Referee: (United States) Mike O'Brien

9 December 2017	New Zealand	0–22	United States	Cape Town Stadium
12:05	Cards: Ware (yellow card) 8' to 10'		Try: Isles 3', 6'; Pinkleman 9'; Unufe 14'; Con: Hughes (1/4) 10'	Referee: (Scotland) Sam Grove-White

9 December 2017	Australia	14–31	United States	Cape Town Stadium
15:04	Try: Killingworth 1'; Anderson 9'; Con: Stannard (1/1) 1'; Porch (1/1) 10'		Try: Isles 2', 6', 7'; Tomasin 8'; Hughes 12'; Con: Hughes (3/5) 3', 8', 13'; Cards: Unufe (yellow card) 9' to 11'	Referee: (Wales) Craig Evans

9 December 2017	New Zealand	50–0	Spain	Cape Town Stadium
15:26	Try: Webber 1'; Mikkelson 3', 5'; Baker 7'; Ware 9'; Dickson 10', 13'; Koroi 14'; Con: Webber (1/1) 1'; Koroi (3/5) 4', 7', 9'; Knewstubb (1/2) 14'		Cards: Martin (yellow card) 7' to 9'	Referee: (Argentina) Damian Schneider

9 December 2017	Spain	5–26	United States	Cape Town Stadium
18:50	Try: Carter 12'; Con: Hernandez (0/1); Cards: Hernandez (yellow card) 4' to 6'		Try: Williams 1'; Hughes 5'; Unufe 7'; Tomasin 10'; Con: Hughes (3/4) 1', 7', 11'	Referee: (South Africa) Rasta Rasivhenge

9 December 2017	New Zealand	35–12	Australia	Cape Town Stadium
19:12	Try: Koroi 1', 11'; Collier 5', 7'; Molia 13'; Con: Koroi (2/2) 1', 11'; Curry (1/1) 6'; Webber (1/1) 7'; Knewstubb (1/1) 13'; Cards: Koroi (yellow card) 5' to 7'		Try: Kennewell 8'; Holland 9'; Con: Stannard (1/2) 8'	Referee: (South Africa) Craig Joubert

=== Pool C ===
Team	Pld	W	D	L	PF	PA	PD	Pts
England	3	3	0	0	72	14	+58	9
Argentina	3	2	0	1	69	45	+24	7
Scotland	3	1	0	2	66	31	+35	5
Uganda	3	0	0	3	7	124	–117	3

9 December 2017	Scotland	14–19	Argentina	Cape Town Stadium
10:59	Try: Bryce 7'; Farndale 8'; Con: Lowe (2/2) 7', 8'		Try: Sabato 1'; Etchart 2'; Mare 11'; Con: Bazan (2/3) 2', 12'

9 December 2017	England	36–0	Uganda	Cape Town Stadium
11:21	Try: Glover 1'; Burgess 8'; Norton 10'; Lindsay-Hague 11'; McConnochie 13'; Con: Mitchell (2/3), 8', 10'; Edwards (1/2) 13'			Referee: (Portugal) Paulo Duarte

9 December 2017	Scotland	45–0	Uganda	Cape Town Stadium
14:20	Try: Ferguson 5', 7'; Cuthbert 4'; McFarland 6'; Lowe 9'; Pecquer 11', 13'; Con: Lowe (4/5) 5', 6', 7', 10'; Ferguson (1/2) 13'			Referee: (England) Richard Haughton

9 December 2017	England	24–7	Argentina	Cape Town Stadium
14:42	Try: Glover 3'; Norton 5', 14'; Hayter 14'; Con: Mitchell (2/3) 3', 14'		Try: Roura 4'; Con: del Mestre (1/1) 4'	Referee: (South Africa) Craig Joubert

9 December 2017	Argentina	43–7	Uganda	Cape Town Stadium
17:41	Try: Roura 1', 8'; Etchart 5'; Sabato 6'; Filizzola 10' del Mestre 12'; Moroni 13'; Con: Bazan (1/3) 5'; Mare (1/1) 8' del Mestre (2/2) 12', 13'; Filizzola (0/1)		Try: Ssebuliba 14'; Con: Ijongat (1/1) 14'	Referee: (Wales) Craig Evans

9 December 2017	England	12–7	Scotland	Cape Town Stadium
18:03	Try: Mitchell 8'; McConnochie 10'; Con: Mitchell (1/2) 8'		Try: Bryce 5'; Con: Lowe (1/1) 6'	Referee: (New Zealand) Richard Kelly

=== Pool D ===
Team	Pld	W	D	L	PF	PA	PD	Pts
Canada	3	2	0	1	70	47	+23	7
Fiji	3	2	0	1	80	43	+37	7
Wales	3	1	0	2	45	71	–26	5
Samoa	3	1	0	2	38	72	–34	5

9 December 2017	Samoa	19–17	Canada	Cape Town Stadium
10:15	Try: Motuga 7'; Iosefo 9', 13'; Con: Mealoi (1/1) 7'; Tupou (1/2) 10'		Try: Fuailefau 3'; Hirayama 5'; Moonlight 8'; Con: Hirayama (1/3) 8'	Referee: (England) Richard Haughton

9 December 2017	Fiji	28–14	Wales	Cape Town Stadium
10:37	Try: Nasoko 3'; Sau 4', 6'; Veremalua 5'; Con: Tuwai (1/1) 3'; Nasilasila (3/3) 4', 6', 7'		Try: Treharne 11'; Williams 12'; Con: Davies (2/2) 11', 13'

9 December 2017	Samoa	12–17	Wales	Cape Town Stadium
13:36	Try: Alosio 5', 13'; Con: Mealoi (1/2) 5'		Try: Morgan 2', 7', 11'; Con: Davies (1/3) 3'	Referee: (New Zealand) Richard Kelly

9 December 2017	Fiji	14–22	Canada	Cape Town Stadium
	Try: Tuwai 1'; Nasilasila 13'; Con: Nasilasila (2/2) 1', 13'		Try: Moonlight 4'; Jones 6'; Douglas 8', 10'; Con: Hirayama (1/4) 4'	Referee: (Australia) Damon Murphy

9 December 2017	Canada	31–14	Wales	Cape Town Stadium
16:57	Try: Berna 1'; Douglas 3'; Fualiefau 5'; Jones 8'; Kay 11'; Con: Hirayama (3/5) 3', 8', 12'; Cards: Kaay (yellow card) 13' to 14'		Try: Davies 7'; Con: Davies (2/2) 7'	Referee: (Portugal) Paulo Duarte

9 December 2017	Fiji	38–7	Samoa	Cape Town Stadium
17:19	Try: Dranisinukula 1', 14'; Kunavula 3'; Sai 5'; Ravouvou 10'; Nasilasila 12'; Con: Ravouvou (3/5) 2', 6', 10'; Nasilasila (1/2) 13'		Try: Perez 7'; Con: Mealoi (1/1) 7'	Referee: (Scotland) Sam Grove-White

== Knockout stage ==
=== 13th place ===
Semi-finals
10 December 2017 – 13:57 – Cape Town
Kenya	33
Scotland	12
10 December 2017 – 14:19 – Cape Town
Russia	19
Uganda	28

13th Place Final
10 December 2017 – 17:43 – Cape Town
Kenya	24
Uganda	14

Matches

Semi-finals

10 December 2017	Kenya	33–12	Scotland	Cape Town Stadium
13:57	Try: Tanga 1', 8'; Oluoch 4'; Oyoo 9'; Ngethe 14'; Con: Oliech (4/5) 1', 8', 9', 14'		Try: Farndale 6'; McCann 13'; Con: Ferguson (1/1) 13'; Lowe (0/1)	Referee: (Portugal) Paulo Duarte

10 December 2017	Russia	17–21	Uganda	Cape Town Stadium
14:19	Try: Ianiushkin 1'; Mysin 6'; Akuabu 9'; Con: Mysin (1/1) 6'; Roschin (1/1) 10'; Ianiushkin (0/1)		Try: Ssebuliba 3', 13'; Okia 5', 7'; Con: Ofoyrwoth (3/3) 4', 5', 7'; Kermundu (1/1) 13'	Referee: (United States) Mike O'Brien

13th Place Final

10 December 2017	Kenya	24–14	Uganda	Cape Town Stadium
17:43	Try: Sikuta 1'; Oluoch 6'; Ngethe 12'; Ouma 14'; Con: Tanga (2/4) 1', 6'; Cards: Oluoch (yellow card) 2' to 4'		Try: Kasito 10'; Ssebuliba 11'; Con: Ofoyrwoth (2/2) 11', 12'	Referee: (Argentina) Damian Schneider

=== Challenge Trophy ===
Quarter-finals
10 December 2017 – 10:36 – Cape Town
Kenya	15
Samoa	19
10 December 2017 – 10:58 – Cape Town
Scotland	7
Spain	22
10 December 2017 – 11:20 – Cape Town
Wales	21
Russia	12
10 December 2017 – 11:42 – Cape Town
Australia	47
Uganda	12

Semi-finals
10 December 2017 – 14:41 – Cape Town
Samoa	0
Spain	24
10 December 2017 – 15:03 – Cape Town
Wales	5
Australia	42

Challenge Trophy Final
10 December 2017 – 18:05 – Cape Town
Spain	7
Australia	26

Matches

Quarter-finals

10 December 2017	Kenya	15–19	Samoa	Cape Town Stadium
10:36	Try: Oliech 2'; Sikuta 5'; Oluoch 14'; Con: Tanga (0/3)		Try: Alosio 1'; Perez 7'; Tupou 13'; Con: Tupou (2/3) 2', 7'	Referee: (South Africa) Rasta Rasivhenge

10 December 2017	Scotland	7–24	Spain	Cape Town Stadium
10:58	Try: Elms 3'; Con: Lowe (1/1) 3'		Try: Poggi 7'; Carrion 7'; Pla 8', 10'; Con: Hernandez (2/4) 7', 10'	Referee: (Wales) Craig Evans

10 December 2017	Wales	21–12	Russia	Cape Town Stadium
11:20	Try: Williams 10', 14'; Morgan 13'; Con: Davies (3/3) 10', 13', 14'		Try: Ostroushko 1'; Ostroushko 4'; Con: Ianiushkin (1/1) 2'; Gostyuzhev (0/1)

10 December 2017	Australia	47–12	Uganda	Cape Town Stadium
11:42	Try: O'Donnell 1', 7'; Holland 3', 4'; Porch 6'; Longbottom 8', 12'; Con: Stannard (5/5) 1', 4', 7', 7', 8'; Porch (1/2) 3'		Try: Okia 11'; Kasito 14'; Con: Ofoyrwoth (1/1) 14'; Aredo (0/1)	Referee: (Argentina) Damian Schneider

Semi-finals

10 December 2017	Samoa	0–24	Spain	Cape Town Stadium
14:41			Try: Carrion 4'; Genua 6'; Sainz-Trapaga 8'; Pla 14'; Con: Genua (2/3) 4', 6'; Sainz-Trapaga (0/1)	Referee: (Argentina) Damian Schneider

10 December 2017	Wales	5–42	Australia	Cape Town Stadium
15:03	Try: Lewis 7'; Con: Jones (0/1); Cards: Talbot-Davies (yellow card) 14' to 14'		Try: Holland 1'; O'Donnell 4', 10'; Quinn 8'; Anstee 9'; Longbottom 14'; Con: Stannard (6/6) 2', 5', 8', 9', 10', 14'; Cards: Quinn (yellow card) 5' to 7'	Referee: (Scotland) Sam Grove-White

Challenge Trophy Final

10 December 2017	Spain	7–26	Australia	Cape Town Stadium
18:05	Try: Alsonso 14'; Con: Fontes (1/1) 14'		Try: Anstee 2'; O'Donnell 5', 9'; Hood 12'; Con: Stannard (3/4) 3', 5', 9'	Referee: (United States) Mike O'Brien

=== 5th place ===
Semi-finals
10 December 2017 – 15:50 – Cape Town
Fiji	19
England	12
10 December 2017 – 16:12 – Cape Town
France	12
United States	29

5th Place Final
10 December 2017 – 18:36 – Cape Town
Fiji	26
United States	12

Matches

Semi-finals

10 December 2017	Fiji	19–12	England	Cape Town Stadium
15:50	Try: Tuwai 3', 7'; Sau 14'; Con: Nasilasila (2/2) 7', 14'; Ravouvou (0/1)		Try: Bowen 8'; Norton 12'; Con: Mitchell (1/2) 12'	Referee: (Australia) Damon Murphy

10 December 2017	France	12–29	United States	Cape Town Stadium
16:12	Try: Riva 4'; Veredamu 14'; Con: Riva (1/1) 5'; Cards: Riva (yellow card) 10' to 12'; Daoudou (yellow card) 12' to 14'		Try: Barret 1'; Niua 3'; Hughes 7'; Isles 10'; Leuta 12'; Con: Hughes (2/4) 1', 3'; Tomasin (0/1)

5th Place Final

10 December 2017	Fiji	26–12	United States	Cape Town Stadium
18:36	Try: Tuwai 2', 11'; Vakurunabili 6'; Sau 13'; Con: Nasilasila (3/3) 2', 12', 14'; Ravouvou (0/1)		Try: Tomasin 9'; Unufe 14'; Con: Hughes (1/2) 14'	Referee: (New Zealand) Richard Kelly

=== Cup ===
Quarter-finals
10 December 2017 – 12:04 – Cape Town
South Africa	31
Fiji	26
10 December 2017 – 12:26 – Cape Town
England	12
New Zealand	17
10 December 2017 – 12:48 – Cape Town
Canada	35
France	7
10 December 2017 – 13:10 – Cape Town
United States	12
Argentina	28

Semi-finals
10 December 2017 – 16:34 – Cape Town
South Africa	12
New Zealand	19
10 December 2017 – 16:56 – Cape Town
Canada	12
Argentina	14

Cup Final
10 December 2017 – 19:44 – Cape Town
New Zealand	38
Argentina	14
Bronze Medal Match
10 December 2017 – 19:18 – Cape Town
South Africa	19
Canada	17

Matches

Quarter-finals

10 December 2017	South Africa	31–26	Fiji	Cape Town Stadium
12:04	Try: Kok 4'; Geduld 7'; Senatla 8', 13'; Smith 12'; Con: Afrika (1/3) 7'; Geduld (2/2) 12' 14'; Cards: Senatla (yellow card) 2' to 4'		Try: Penalty Try 1'; Nasilasila 3'; Vakurunabili 6'; Nasoko 9'; Con: Nasilasila (1/1) 3'; Ravouvou (1/2) 6'	Referee: (New Zealand) Richard Kelly

10 December 2017	England	12–17	New Zealand	Cape Town Stadium
12:26	Try: McConnochie 3', 10'; Con: Mitchell (1/2) 3'; Cards: Mitchell (yellow card) 13' to 14'		Try: Knewstubb 6'; Collier 12'; Ravouvou 14'; Con: Knewstubb (1/1) 14'; Koroi (0/2)	Referee: (Scotland) Sam Grove-White

10 December 2017	Canada	35–7	France	Cape Town Stadium
12:48	Try: Fuailefau 1'; Hirayama 5'; Douglas 7'; Braid 8'; Mullins 11'; Con: Hirayama (5/5) 2', 5', 7', 8', 11'		Try: Demai-Hamecher 14'; Con: Hecquet (1/1) 14'	Referee: (England) Richard Haughton

10 December 2017	United States	12–28	Argentina	Cape Town Stadium
13:10	Try: Tomasin 11'; Niua 13'; Con: Hughes (1/2) 13'		Try: Sabato 2'; Bazan 3'; Roura 10'; Gonzalez 14'; Con: Bazan (3/3) 2', 4', 10' del Mestre (1/1) 14'	Referee: (South Africa) Craig Joubert

Semi-finals

10 December 2017	South Africa	12–19	New Zealand	Cape Town Stadium
16:34	Try: Snyman 1'; Afrika 6'; Con: Du Preez (1/2) 7'		Try: Mikkelson 3'; Koroi 8'; Webber 13'; Con: Koroi (1/1) 3'; Knewstubb (1/2) 13'; Cards: Ravouvou (yellow card) 1' to 3'

10 December 2017	Canada	12–14	Argentina	Cape Town Stadium
16:56	Try: Kay 1'; Braid 7'; Con: Hirayama (1/2) 1'		Try: Alvarez 3'; Etchart 9'; Con: Bazan (2/2) 3', 9'	Referee: (South Africa) Rasta Rasivhenge

Bronze Medal Match

10 December 2017	South Africa	19–17	Canada	Cape Town Stadium
19:18	Try: Soyizwapi 2'; Nel 7'; Specman 8'; Con: Geduld (2/3) 2', 7'		Try: Jones 5'; Hirayama 9', 14'; Con: Hirayama (1/3) 14'; Cards: Kaay (yellow card) 8' to 10'	Referee: (England) Richard Haughton

Cup Final

10 December 2017	New Zealand	38–14	Argentina	Cape Town Stadium
19:44	Try: Ravouvou 2', 11'; Koroi 4'; Mikkelson 9'; Ware 12'; Molia 14'; Con: Knewstubb (3/5) 3', 5', 9', 14'		Try: Bazan 7'; Gonzalez 13'; Con: Bazan (2/2) 7', 13'	Referee: (South Africa) Rasta Rasivhenge

== Tournament placings ==
Place	Team	Points
1st place, gold medalist(s)	New Zealand	22
2nd place, silver medalist(s)	Argentina	19
3rd place, bronze medalist(s)	South Africa	17
4	Canada	15
5	Fiji	13
6	United States	12
7	England	10
7	France	10

Place	Team	Points
9	Australia	8
10	Spain	7
11	Samoa	5
11	Wales	5
13	Kenya	3
14	Uganda	2
15	Russia	1
15	Scotland	1

Source: World Rugby

== Players ==
=== Scoring leaders ===
Tries scored
Rank	Player	Tries
1	(South Africa) Seabelo Senatla	7
2	(Australia) Ben O'Donnell	6
	(United States) Carlin Isles	6
4	(Fiji) Eroni Sau	5
	(Fiji) Jerry Tuwai	5

Points scored
Rank	Player	Points
1	(Canada) Nathan Hirayama	44
2	(Fiji) Amenoni Nasilasila	41
3	(United States) Madison Hughes	37
	(New Zealand) Vilimoni Koroi	37
5	(Australia) James Stannard	36

Source: World Rugby

=== Dream Team ===
The following seven players were selected to the tournament Dream Team at the conclusion of the tournament:

Forwards	Backs
(Canada) Mike Fuailefau (South Africa) Philip Snyman (New Zealand) Tim Mikkelson	(Canada) Justin Douglas (Fiji) Amenoni Nasilasila (New Zealand) Vilimoni Koroi (Argentina) Rodrigo Etchart

World Sevens Series XIX
Preceded by 2017 Dubai Sevens	2017 South Africa Sevens	Succeeded by 2018 Sydney Sevens
South Africa Sevens
Preceded by 2016 South Africa Sevens	2017 South Africa Sevens	Succeeded by 2018 South Africa Sevens
