= 2017–18 World Rugby Sevens Series =

19th annual international series in men's rugby sevens

2017–18 World Rugby Sevens
- Series XIX
- Hosts: United Arab Emirates; South Africa; Australia; New Zealand; United States; Canada; Hong Kong; England; France
- Date: 1 Dec 2017 – 10 Jun 2018
- Nations: 21

Final positions
- Champions: South Africa
- Runners-up: Fiji
- Third: New Zealand

Series details
- Top try scorer: Carlin Isles (49)
- Top point scorer: Nathan Hirayama (334)

The 2017–18 World Rugby Sevens Series, known for sponsorship reasons as the HSBC World Rugby Sevens Series, was the 19th annual series of rugby sevens tournaments for national men's rugby sevens teams. The Sevens Series has been run by World Rugby since 1999–2000.

== Core teams ==
- Argentina
- Australia
- Canada
- England
- Fiji
- France
- Kenya
- New Zealand
- Russia
- Samoa
- Scotland
- South Africa
- Spain
- United States
- Wales

== Tour venues ==
The official schedule for the 2017–18 World Rugby Sevens Series was as follows:

2017–18 Venues
| Leg | Stadium | City | Dates | Winner |
|---|---|---|---|---|
| Dubai | The Sevens | Dubai | 1–2 December 2017 | South Africa |
| South Africa | Cape Town Stadium | Cape Town | 9–10 December 2017 | New Zealand |
| Australia | Allianz Stadium | Sydney | 26–28 January 2018 | Australia |
| New Zealand | FMG Stadium Waikato | Hamilton | 3–4 February 2018 | Fiji |
| United States | Sam Boyd Stadium | Las Vegas | 2–4 March 2018 | United States |
| Canada | BC Place | Vancouver | 10–11 March 2018 | Fiji |
| Hong Kong | Hong Kong Stadium | Hong Kong | 6–8 April 2018 | Fiji |
| Singapore | National Stadium | Singapore | 28–29 April 2018 | Fiji |
| England | Twickenham Stadium | London | 2–3 June 2018 | Fiji |
| France | Stade Jean-Bouin | Paris | 8–10 June 2018 | South Africa |

There were several significant changes to the schedule:

- The New Zealand event moved from Wellington, which had hosted an event in every previous season of the series, to Hamilton.
- The Australia and New Zealand events will swap places in the tournament order.
- The schedule includes a break for the 2018 Commonwealth Games, which will hold its sevens tournament on 14–15 April at Gold Coast.
- The Paris and London Sevens, which swapped places in the season order, will take place several weeks later than usual in order to provide more rest for players, many of whom will have been involved in the Commonwealth Games.

== Standings ==
The final standings after completion of the ten tournaments of the series are shown in the table below.

The points awarded to teams at each tournament, as well as the overall season totals, are shown. Gold indicates the event champions. Silver indicates the event runner-ups. Bronze indicates the event third place finishers. A dash (–) is recorded in the event column if a team did not compete at a tournament.

Official standings for the 2017–18 series:

2017–18 World Rugby Sevens – Series XIX
| Pos. | Event Team | Dubai | Cape Town | Sydney | Hamilton | Las Vegas | Vancouver | Hong Kong | Singapore | London | Paris | Points total | Points difference |
|---|---|---|---|---|---|---|---|---|---|---|---|---|---|
| 1 | South Africa | 22 | 17 | 19 | 19 | 15 | 17 | 17 | 15 | 19 | 22 | 182 | 811 |
| 2 | Fiji | 15 | 13 | 12 | 22 | 17 | 22 | 22 | 22 | 22 | 13 | 180 | 819 |
| 3 | New Zealand | 19 | 22 | 13 | 15 | 13 | 10 | 15 | 13 | 13 | 17 | 150 | 520 |
| 4 | Australia | 13 | 8 | 22 | 17 | 12 | 12 | 5 | 19 | 10 | 5 | 123 | 344 |
| 5 | England | 17 | 10 | 10 | 10 | 10 | 13 | 1 | 17 | 15 | 19 | 122 | 344 |
| 6 | United States | 1 | 12 | 15 | 8 | 22 | 15 | 12 | 8 | 12 | 12 | 117 | 333 |
| 7 | Argentina | 5 | 19 | 17 | 7 | 19 | 10 | 13 | 2 | 5 | 8 | 105 | 308 |
| 8 | Kenya | 10 | 3 | 10 | 12 | 10 | 19 | 19 | 10 | 8 | 3 | 104 | –111 |
| 9 | Canada | 5 | 15 | 3 | 5 | 7 | 2 | 7 | 7 | 10 | 15 | 76 | 168 |
| 10 | Samoa | 12 | 5 | 5 | 13 | 3 | 3 | 2 | 12 | 3 | 1 | 59 | –149 |
| 11 | Spain | 7 | 7 | 1 | 1 | 2 | 7 | 10 | 10 | 1 | 10 | 56 | –517 |
| 12 | Scotland | 10 | 1 | 2 | 10 | 5 | 8 | 10 | 5 | 2 | 2 | 55 | –55 |
| 13 | France | 8 | 10 | 8 | 3 | 8 | 1 | 8 | 1 | 1 | 5 | 53 | –215 |
| 14 | Wales | 3 | 5 | 7 | 2 | 5 | 5 | 3 | 5 | 7 | 7 | 49 | –322 |
| 15 | Ireland | – | – | – | – | – | – | – | – | 17 | 10 | 27 | –42 |
| 16 | Russia | 1 | 1 | 5 | 1 | 1 | 5 | 5 | 1 | 5 | 1 | 26 | –886 |
| 17 | Papua New Guinea | – | – | 1 | 5 | – | – | – | – | – | – | 6 | |
| 18 | Uganda | 2 | 2 | – | – | – | – | – | – | – | – | 4 | |
| 19 | Japan | – | – | – | – | – | – | – | 3 | – | – | 3 | |
| 20 | Uruguay | – | – | – | – | 1 | 1 | – | – | – | – | 2 | |
| 21 | South Korea | – | – | – | – | – | – | 1 | – | – | – | 1 | |

Source: World Rugby. Archived

Legend
Event Medalists
| Gold | Event Champions |
| Silver | Event Runner-ups |
| Bronze | Event Third place finishers |
Qualification for the 2018–19 World Rugby Sevens Series
| No colour | Core team in 2017–18 and re-qualified as a core team for the 2018–19 World Rugby Sevens Series |
| Pink | Relegated as the lowest placed core team at the end of the 2017–18 season |
| Yellow | Not a core team |

== Placings summary ==
Tallies of top four tournament placings during the 2017–18 series, by team:

| Team | Gold | Silver | Bronze | Fourth | Total |
|---|---|---|---|---|---|
| Fiji | 5 | – | 1 | 1 | 7 |
| South Africa | 2 | 3 | 3 | 2 | 10 |
| New Zealand | 1 | 1 | 1 | 2 | 5 |
| Australia | 1 | 1 | 1 | – | 3 |
| United States | 1 | – | – | 2 | 3 |
| Argentina | – | 2 | 1 | – | 3 |
| Kenya | – | 2 | – | – | 2 |
| England | – | 1 | 2 | 1 | 4 |
| Ireland | – | – | 1 | – | 1 |
| Canada | – | – | – | 2 | 2 |
| Totals | 10 | 10 | 10 | 10 | 40 |

== Players ==
=== Scoring leaders ===
Tries scored
| No. | Player | Tries |
|---|---|---|
| 1 | Carlin Isles | 49 |
| 2 | Luke Morgan | 44 |
| 3 | Dan Norton | 38 |
| 4 | Eroni Sau | 37 |
| 4 | Perry Baker | 37 |
| 6 | Justin Douglas | 35 |
| 6 | Seabelo Senatla | 35 |
| 8 | Ben O'Donnell | 32 |
| 9 | Willy Ambaka | 31 |
| 10 | Joe Ravouvou | 28 |
| 10 | John Porch | 28 |

Updated: 10 June 2018

Points scored
| No. | Player | Points |
|---|---|---|
| 1 | Nathan Hirayama | 334 |
| 2 | Amenoni Nasilasila | 316 |
| 3 | Tom Mitchell | 263 |
| 4 | Carlin Isles | 247 |
| 5 | Luke Morgan | 220 |
| 6 | Jean-Pascal Barraque | 211 |
| 7 | James Stannard | 197 |
| 8 | Dan Norton | 190 |
| 8 | Vatemo Ravouvou | 190 |
| 10 | Perry Baker | 187 |

Updated: 10 June 2018

=== Awards ===
Impact player by tournament
| Tour Leg | Player | Points | Ref. |
|---|---|---|---|
| Dubai | Alamanda Motuga; Seabelo Senatla | 50 | |
| Cape Town | Amenoni Nasilasila | 60 | |
| Sydney | Ben O'Donnell | 58 | |
| Hamilton | Seabelo Senatla | 49 | |
| Las Vegas | Ben O'Donnell | 52 | |
| Vancouver | Glenn Bryce | 61 | |
| Hong Kong | Eroni Sau | 53 | |
| Singapore | Ben O'Donnell | 54 | |
| London | Martin Iosefo; Owen Jenkins; Billy Odhiambo; Vladimir Ostroushko | 46 | |
| Paris | Robbie Fergusson | 50 | |

Total impact player points
| Pos | Player | T | B | O | C | Total |
|---|---|---|---|---|---|---|
| 1 | Justin Douglas | 105 | 47 | 29 | 173 | 386 |
| 2 | Ben O'Donnell | 191 | 47 | 26 | 184 | 348 |
| 3 | Amenoni Nasilasila | 132 | 45 | 33 | 120 | 330 |
| 4 | Eroni Sau | 126 | 54 | 29 | 119 | 328 |
| 5 | Harry Jones | 101 | 25 | 14 | 171 | 311 |
| 6 | Ben Pinkelman | 113 | 30 | 17 | 132 | 292 |
| 7 | Martin Iosefo | 76 | 35 | 43 | 137 | 291 |
| 8 | Nathan Hirayama | 79 | 37 | 28 | 135 | 279 |
| 9 | Jerry Tuwai | 65 | 47 | 33 | 118 | 263 |
| 10 | John Porch | 85 | 33 | 21 | 122 | 261 |

Updated: 5 June 2018

Player of the final award
| Tour Leg | Winner | Ref. |
|---|---|---|
| Dubai | Kwagga Smith | |
| Cape Town | Joe Ravouvou | |
| Sydney | Lachlan Anderson | |
| Hamilton | Alasio Naduva | |
| Las Vegas | Danny Barrett | |
| Vancouver | Sevuloni Mocenacagi | |
| Hong Kong | Amenoni Nasilasila | |
| Singapore | Waisea Nacuqu | |
| London | Semi Radradra | |
| Paris | Dewald Human | |

Updated: 5 June 2018

== Tournaments ==
=== Dubai ===
| Event | Winners | Score | Finalists | Semi-finalists |
|---|---|---|---|---|
| Cup | South Africa | 24–12 | New Zealand | England (Bronze); Fiji |
| 5th Place | Australia | 22–17 | Samoa | Kenya; Scotland |
| Challenge Trophy | France | 21–12 | Spain | Argentina; Canada |
| 13th Place | Wales | 26–7 | Uganda | Russia; United States |

=== Cape Town ===
| Event | Winners | Score | Finalists | Semi-finalists |
|---|---|---|---|---|
| Cup | New Zealand | 38–14 | Argentina | South Africa (Bronze); Canada |
| 5th Place | Fiji | 26–12 | United States | England; France |
| Challenge Trophy | Australia | 26–7 | Spain | Samoa; Wales |
| 13th Place | Kenya | 24–14 | Uganda | Russia; Scotland |

=== Sydney ===
| Event | Winners | Score | Finalists | Semi-finalists |
|---|---|---|---|---|
| Cup | Australia | 29–0 | South Africa | Argentina (Bronze); United States |
| 5th Place | New Zealand | 31–7 | Fiji | England; Kenya |
| Challenge Trophy | France | 29–12 | Wales | Russia; Samoa |
| 13th Place | Canada | 14–12 | Scotland | Papua New Guinea; Spain |

=== Hamilton ===
| Event | Winners | Score | Finalists | Semi-finalists |
|---|---|---|---|---|
| Cup | Fiji | 24–17 | South Africa | Australia (Bronze); New Zealand |
| 5th Place | Samoa | 19–15 | Kenya | Scotland; England |
| Challenge Trophy | United States | 31–12 | Argentina | Canada; Papua New Guinea |
| 13th Place | France | 19–17 | Wales | Russia; Spain |

=== Las Vegas ===
| Event | Winners | Score | Finalists | Semi-finalists |
|---|---|---|---|---|
| Cup | United States | 28–0 | Argentina | Fiji (Bronze); South Africa |
| 5th Place | New Zealand | 17–12 (a.e.t.) | Australia | England; Kenya |
| Challenge Trophy | France | 26–19 | Canada | Scotland; Wales |
| 13th Place | Samoa | 28–7 | Spain | Russia; Uruguay |

=== Vancouver ===
| Event | Winners | Score | Finalists | Semi-finalists |
|---|---|---|---|---|
| Cup | Fiji | 31–12 | Kenya | South Africa (Bronze); United States |
| 5th Place | England | 31–14 | Australia | Argentina; New Zealand |
| Challenge Trophy | Scotland | 29–5 | Spain | Russia; Wales |
| 13th Place | Samoa | 21–10 | Canada | France; Uruguay |

=== Hong Kong ===
| Event | Winners | Score | Finalists | Semi-finalists |
|---|---|---|---|---|
| Cup | Fiji | 24–12 | Kenya | South Africa (Bronze); New Zealand |
| 5th Place | Argentina | 14–12 | United States | Spain; Scotland |
| Challenge Trophy | France | 33–7 | Canada | Australia; Russia |
| 13th Place | Wales | 33–5 | Samoa | England; South Korea |
| World Series Qualifier | Japan | 19–14 | Germany | Chile; Ireland |

=== Singapore ===
| Event | Winners | Score | Finalists | Semi-finalists |
|---|---|---|---|---|
| Cup | Fiji | 28–22 | Australia | England (Bronze); South Africa |
| 5th Place | New Zealand | 36–17 | Samoa | Kenya; Spain |
| Challenge Trophy | United States | 26–12 | Canada | Scotland; Wales |
| 13th Place | Japan | 31–24 | Argentina | France; Russia |

=== London ===
| Event | Winners | Score | Finalists | Semi-finalists |
|---|---|---|---|---|
| Cup | Fiji | 21-17 | South Africa | Ireland (Bronze); England |
| 5th Place | New Zealand | 26-5 | United States | Australia; Canada |
| Challenge Trophy | Kenya | 33-19 | Wales | Argentina; Russia |
| 13th Place | Samoa | 34-10 | Scotland | France; Spain |

=== Paris ===
| Event | Winners | Score | Finalists | Semi-finalists |
|---|---|---|---|---|
| Cup | South Africa | 24–14 | England | New Zealand (Bronze); Canada |
| 5th Place | Fiji | 28–7 | United States | Ireland; Spain |
| Challenge Trophy | Argentina | 33–26 | Wales | Australia; France |
| 13th Place | Kenya | 21–20 | Scotland | Russia; Samoa |

== See also ==
- 2017–18 World Rugby Women's Sevens Series
