= 2018 Canada Sevens =

- 2017–18 World Series
- Host nation: Canada
- Date: 10–11 March 2018

Cup
- Champion: Fiji
- Runner-up: Kenya
- Third: South Africa

Challenge
- Winner: Scotland

Tournament details
- Matches played: 45
- Tries scored: 275 (average 6.11 per match)
- Most points: (Canada) Nathan Hirayama (57)
- Most tries: (Australia) John Porch (9)

The 2018 Canada Sevens was the third edition of the Canada Sevens tournament, and the sixth tournament of the 2017–18 World Rugby Sevens Series. The tournament was played on 10–11 March at BC Place in Vancouver.

== Format ==
The teams were drawn into four pools of four teams each, with each team playing every other team in their pool once. The top two teams from each pool advanced to the Cup/5th place brackets. The bottom two teams from each group went to the Challenge trophy/13th place brackets.

== Teams ==
Fifteen core teams participated in the tournament along with one invited team, the highest-placing non-core team of the 2018 Sudamérica Rugby Sevens, Uruguay:

- Argentina
- Australia
- Canada
- England
- Fiji
- France
- Kenya
- New Zealand
- Russia
- Samoa
- Scotland
- South Africa
- Spain
- United States
- Uruguay
- Wales

== Pool stage ==
All times in Pacific Standard Time (UTC−08:00). The pools were scheduled as follows:

=== Pool A ===
Team	Pld	W	D	L	PF	PA	PD	Pts
Australia	3	2	1	0	100	57	+43	8
United States	3	2	0	1	94	52	+42	7
Canada	3	1	1	1	87	52	+35	6
Uruguay	3	0	0	3	22	142	–120	3

10 March 2018	Australia	19–19	Canada	BC Place, Vancouver
11:42	Try: Porch 0' c O'Donnell 8' c, 10' m Con: Stannard (2/3) 0', 9'		Try: Hirayama 3' c Kaay 8' m Moonlight 14' c Con: Hirayama (2/3) 4', 14'	Referee: Craig Evans (Wales)

10 March 2018	United States	45–0	Uruguay	BC Place, Vancouver
12:04	Try: Isles 3' m, 7' c Iosefo 5' c Leuta 6' c Baker 8' c M Al-Jiboori 12' m Williams 13' c Con: Niua (4/5) 5', 6', 7', 8'; Melphy (1/2) 13'		Cards: Puig (yellow card) 12' to 14'	Referee: James Doleman (New Zealand)

10 March 2018	Australia	50–17	Uruguay	BC Place, Vancouver
15:14	Try: Stannard 1' c Holland 3' c, 7' m, 8' c, 9' c O'Donnell 3' m Anstee 10' m Porch 11' c Con: Stannard (3/6) 1', 3', 8'; Tom Lucas (2/2) 9', 12'		Try: Ardao 5' c Berchesi 13' m Alonso 14' m Con: Lijtenstein (1/1) 5'	Referee: Damian Schneider (Argentina)

10 March 2018	United States	28–21	Canada	BC Place, Vancouver
15:36	Try: Baker 5' c, 7' c Leuta 8' c Williams 14' c Con: Niua (3/3) 6', 7', 8'; Baker 14' (1/1)		Try: Braid 1' c Douglas 4' c Moonlight 10' c Con: Hirayama (3/3) 2', 5', 10'	Referee: Richard Kelly (New Zealand)

10 March 2018	Canada	47–5	Uruguay	BC Place, Vancouver
18:46	Try: Hirayama 4' c Moonlight 6' m, 8' c Jones 7' c Braid 10' c Douglas 13' c, 14' c Con: Hirayama (6/7) 5', 7', 8', 10', 13', 14'; Cards: Braid (yellow card) 1' to 3'		Try: Ardao 1' m	Referee: Mike O'Brien (United States)

10 March 2018	United States	21–31	Australia	BC Place, Vancouver
19:08	Try: Isles 2' c Baker 5' c, 7' c Con: Niua (3/3) 2', 5', 7'		Try: Parahi 4' c Porch 8' c, 12' m, 14' m Holland 10' c Con: Stannard (3/5) 4', 8', 10'; Cards: Taylor (yellow card) 7' to 9'	Referee: Craig Joubert (South Africa)

=== Pool B ===
Team	Pld	W	D	L	PF	PA	PD	Pts
England	3	2	0	1	62	33	+29	7
Argentina	3	2	0	1	64	40	+24	7
Samoa	3	2	0	1	56	37	+19	7
Wales	3	0	0	3	27	99	–72	3

10 March 2018	England	36–5	Wales	BC Place, Vancouver
10:58	Try: Norton 1', 3', 7'; Lindsay-Hague 10', 14'; Rodwell 12'; Con: Mitchell (1/3) 2'; Bibby (2/3) 11', 14'		Try: Roach 5'; Con: O'Brien (0/1)	Referee: (New Zealand) Richard Kelly

10 March 2018	Argentina	22–7	Samoa	BC Place, Vancouver
11:20	Try: Roura 3'; Gonzalez 11'; Moroni 14'; Con: Revol (2/3) 3', 12'; Pen: Revol (1/1) 13'		Try: Fomai 4'; Con: Mealoi (1/1) 4'	Referee: (South Africa) Craig Joubert

10 March 2018	England	5–21	Samoa	BC Place, Vancouver
14:30	Try: Burgess 10'; Con: Mitchell (0/1)		Try: Afamasaga 2'; Alofipo 12'; Leilua 14'; Con: Tupou (2/2) 3', 13'; Paulo (1/1) 14'	Referee: (Wales) Craig Evans

10 March 2018	Argentina	35–12	Wales	BC Place, Vancouver
14:52	Try: Gonzalez 1'; Mare 8'; Moroni 9'; Bazan Velez 10'; Passaro 13'; Con: Revol (3/3) 2', 10', 10'; Bazan Velez (2/2) 8', 13'		Try: Morgan 3'; O'Brien 11'; Con: O'Brien (1/2) 12'	Referee: (France) Jérémy Rozier

10 March 2018	Wales	10–28	Samoa	BC Place, Vancouver
18:02	Try: Evans 1'; Maynard 3'; Con: Maynard (0/1)		Try: Ale 5'; Paulo 10', 13'; Leilua 12'; Con: Paulo (2/2) 6', 12'; Tupou (2/2) 10', 13'	Referee: (New Zealand) James Doleman

10 March 2018	Argentina	7–21	England	BC Place, Vancouver
18:24	Try: Roura 4'; Con: Revol (1/1) 4'		Try: Burgess 7'; McConnochie 8', 14'; Con: Mitchell (3/3) 7', 8', 14'; Cards: Mitchell (yellow card) 9' to 11'	Referee: (New Zealand) Richard Kelly

=== Pool C ===
Team	Pld	W	D	L	PF	PA	PD	Pts
Fiji	3	3	0	0	107	33	+74	9
Kenya	3	2	0	1	78	31	+47	7
France	3	0	1	2	26	64	–38	4
Spain	3	0	1	2	17	100	–83	4

10 March 2018	Kenya	14–7	France	BC Place, Vancouver
10:14	Try: Oliech 11'; Ouma 14'; Con: Oliech (2/2) 11', 14'		Try: Riva 7'; Con: Barraque (1/1) 7'	Referee: (Australia) Jordan Way

10 March 2018	Fiji	45–5	Spain	BC Place, Vancouver
10:36	Try: Tuwai 1'; Nasoko 2', 4'; Ravouvou 7'; Vakurunabili 9'; Batinisavu 13'; Sau 14'; Con: Ravouvou (3/4) 1', 4', 7'; Nasilasila (2/2) 9', 14'; Nacuqu (0/1)		Try: Rodriguez-Guerra 6'; Con: Hernandez (0/1)	Referee: (United States) Mike O'Brien

10 March 2018	Kenya	43–0	Spain	BC Place, Vancouver
13:46	Try: Odhiambo 2'; Ouma 3'; Ambaka 5', 7'; Oluoch 9'; Owira 11'; Oyoo 13'; Con: Oliech (1/4) 2', Agero (2/2) 9', 11', 13'		Cards: Genua (yellow card) 12' to 14'	Referee: (Portugal) Paulo Duarte

10 March 2018	Fiji	38–7	France	BC Place, Vancouver
14:08	Try: Naduva 2', 7'; Vakurunabili 5'; Tuwai 9'; Nacuqu 11'; Sau 14'; Con: Ravouvou (3/3) 2', 6', 7'; Nasilasila (1/3) 14'		Try: Barraque 8'; Con: Barraque (1/1) 8'	Referee: (New Zealand) James Doleman

10 March 2018	France	12–12	Spain	BC Place, Vancouver
17:18	Try: Villiere 12', 14'; Con: Riva (1/2) 12'		Try: Carter 5'; Alonso 6'; Con: Hernandez (1/2) 6'	Referee: (Argentina) Damian Schneider

10 March 2018	Fiji	24–21	Kenya	BC Place, Vancouver
17:40	Try: Nasoko 2'; Sau 6'; Nasilasila 9'; Kunavula 12'; Con: Nacuqu (1/1) 3'; Nasilasila (1/2) 10'; Ravouvou (0/1); Cards: Nacuqu (yellow card) 7' to 9'		Try: Injera 2'; Agero 8'; Oluoch 14'; Con: Agero (2/2) 2', 8' (1/1) Oliech 14'	Referee: (France) Jérémy Rozier

=== Pool D ===
Team	Pld	W	D	L	PF	PA	PD	Pts
New Zealand	3	3	0	0	95	45	+50	9
South Africa	3	2	0	1	73	40	+33	7
Russia	3	1	0	2	38	93	–55	5
Scotland	3	0	0	3	50	78	–28	3

10 March 2018	New Zealand	31–26	Scotland	BC Place, Vancouver
9:30	Try: Joass 4'; Curry 6', 11'; RE Ware 7', 8'; Con: Knewstubb (3/5) 6', 7', 12'		Try: Graham 1'; Riddell 2'; Farndale 9'; McLennan 14'; Con: Lowe (3/4) 1', 3', 10'	Referee: (France) Jérémy Rozier

10 March 2018	South Africa	38–7	Russia	BC Place, Vancouver
9:52	Try: Afrika 2'; Sage 6'; Nel 8' du Plessis 9'; Gans 11'; Davids 13'; Con: Du Preez (3/4) 7', 8', 10'; Davids (1/2) 14'		Try: Ianiushkin 5'; Con: Ianiushkin (1/1) 6'	Referee: (Portugal) Paulo Duarte

10 March 2018	New Zealand	31–5	Russia	BC Place, Vancouver
13:02	Try: Ravouvou 2', 8', 13'; Dickson 3'; Masirewa 5'; Con: McGarvey-Black (2/4) 2', 4', 13'		Try: Ianiushkin 7'; Con: Ianiushkin (0/1); Cards: Sukhin (yellow card) 2' to 4'	Referee: (Argentina) Damian Schneider

10 March 2018	South Africa	21–0	Scotland	BC Place, Vancouver
13:24	Try: Soyizwapi 5'; Brown 9'; Davids 13'; Con: Du Preez (3/3) 6', 9', 14'			Referee: (Australia) Jordan Way

10 March 2018	Scotland	24–26	Russia	BC Place, Vancouver
16:34	Try: Graham 2'; Riddell 5'; McFarland 8'; Bryce 14'; Con: Fergusson (1/3) 5'; McLennan (1/1) 9'		Try: Ovchinnikov 1', 6'; Sozonov 7'; Zhivatov 10'; Con: Ianiushkin (1/2) 7'; Sukhin (2/2) 7', 10'; Cards: Gostyuzhev (yellow card) 13' to 14'	Referee: (Portugal) Paulo Duarte

10 March 2018	South Africa	14–33	New Zealand	BC Place, Vancouver
16:56	Try: Sage 9'; Brown 13'; Con: Du Preez (2/2) 9', 13'		Try: Curry 2'; Collier 4', 10'; McGarvey-Black 6'; Masirewa 14'; Con: McGarvey-Black (4/5) 2', 4', 6', 14'	Referee: (Wales) Craig Evans

== Knockout stage ==
=== 13th Place ===
Semi-finals
11 March 2018 – 12:46 – BC Place, Vancouver
Canada	31
France	19
11 March 2018 – 13:08 – BC Place, Vancouver
Uruguay	14
Samoa	45

13th Place Final
11 March 2018 – 16:12 – BC Place, Vancouver
Canada	10
Samoa	21

Matches

Semi-finals

11 March 2018	Canada	31–19	France	BC Place, Vancouver
12:46	Try: Hirayama 3', 14'; Moonlight 5'; Braid 9'; Douglas 13'; Con: Hirayama (3/5) 3', 6', 13'		Try: Mazzoleni 1'; Veredamu 4'; Popelin 7'; Con: Riva (2/3) 2', 7'	Referee: (New Zealand) James Doleman

11 March 2018	Uruguay	14–45	Samoa	BC Place, Vancouver
13:08	Try: Berchesi 8'; Ardao 10'; Con: Etcheverry (1/1) 8'; Lijtenstein (1/1) 11'; Cards: Puig (yellow card) 11' to 13'		Try: Nonu 1'; Afamasaga 2'; Paulo 3'; Solia 8'; Ale 12', 14'; Fomai 14'; Con: Tupou (3/3) 1', 2', 4'; Mealoi (2/4) 9', 14'	Referee: (France) Jérémy Rozier

13th Place Final

11 March 2018	Canada	15–21	Samoa	BC Place, Vancouver
16:12	Try: Jones 2'; Moonlight 4'; Hirayama 14'; Con: Hirayama (0/3)		Try: Tupou 7'; Afamasaga 8', 10'; Con: Mealoi (1/1) 7' Tupou (2/2) 8', 11'	Referee: (Australia) Jordan Way

=== Challenge Trophy ===
Quarter-finals
11 March 2018 – 9:30 – BC Place, Vancouver
Canada	0
Scotland	19
11 March 2018 – 9:52 – BC Place, Vancouver
France	12
Wales	19
11 March 2018 – 10:14 – BC Place, Vancouver
Russia	14
Uruguay	7
11 March 2018 – 10:36 – BC Place, Vancouver
Samoa	0
Spain	24

Semi-finals
11 March 2018 – 13:30 – BC Place, Vancouver
Scotland	26
Wales	15
11 March 2018 – 13:52 – BC Place, Vancouver
Russia	7
Spain	14

Challenge Trophy Final
11 March 2018 – 16:37 – BC Place, Vancouver
Scotland	29
Spain	5

Matches

Quarter-finals

11 March 2018	Canada	0–19	Scotland	BC Place, Vancouver
9:30			Try: Graham 2', 11'; Bryce 5'; Con: Fergusson (2/3) 3', 6'	Referee: (Argentina) Damian Schneider

11 March 2018	France	12–19	Wales	BC Place, Vancouver
9:52	Try: Veredamu 4'; Lakafia 7'; Con: Riva (1/2) 4'		Try: Evans 1'; Wilson 6'; Millard 9'; Con: O'Brien (2/3) 1', 6'	Referee: (United States) Mike O'Brien

11 March 2018	Russia	14–7	Uruguay	BC Place, Vancouver
10:14	Try: Davydov 1'; Babaev 5'; Con: Ianiushkin (2/2) 1', 5'; Cards: Sozonov (yellow card) 13' to 14'		Try: Alonso 14'; Con: Etcheverry (1/1) 14'; Cards: Lijtenstein (yellow card) 3' to 5'; Ardao (yellow card) 13' to 14'	Referee: (New Zealand) James Doleman

11 March 2018	Samoa	0–24	Spain	BC Place, Vancouver
10:36			Try: Fontes 5'; Hernandez 7'; J Martin 8'; Genua 13'; Con: Hernandez (2/4) 5', 7'	Referee: (Australia) Jordan Way

Semi-finals

11 March 2018	Scotland	26–15	Wales	BC Place, Vancouver
13:30	Try: Farndale 3', 13'; McLennan 9'; Graham 10'; Con: Fergusson (1/1) 3'; McLennan (2/3) 11', 13'		Try: Millard 5', 14'; Wilson 8'; Con: O'Brien (0/3); Cards: Wilson (yellow card) 2' to 4'	Referee: (Australia) Jordan Way

11 March 2018	Russia	7–14	Spain	BC Place, Vancouver
13:52	Try: Ianiushkin 12'; Con: Sukhin (1/1) 12'		Try: J Martin 2', 6'; Con: Hernandez (2/2) 2', 6'	Referee: (United States) Mike O'Brien

Challenge Trophy Final

4 March 2018	Scotland	29–5	Spain	BC Place, Vancouver
16:37	Try: Farndale 4'; Bryce 7', 14'; Graham 8'; Riddell 11'; Con: McLennan (2/2) 12', 14'; Fergusson (0/3)		Try: Alonso 13'; Con: Hernandez (0/1)	Referee: (Argentina) Damian Schneider

=== 5th Place ===
Semi-finals
11 March 2018 – 14:24 – BC Place, Vancouver
Australia	28
Argentina	24
11 March 2018 – 14:46 – BC Place, Vancouver
New Zealand	17
England	21

5th Place Final
11 March 2018 – 17:07 – BC Place, Vancouver
Australia	14
England	31

Matches

Semi-finals

11 March 2018	Australia	28–24	Argentina	BC Place, Vancouver
14:24	Try: Anstee 3'; Porch 4', 5'; O'Donnell 7'; Con: Stannard (4/4) 3', 5', 5', 7'; Cards: Anstee (yellow card) 8' to 10'		Try: Bazan Velez 8'; Revol 10'; Barbier 13'; Filizzola 14'; Con: Revol (2/2) 8', 10'; Bazan Velez (0/2)	Referee: (South Africa) Craig Joubert

11 March 2018	New Zealand	17–21	England	BC Place, Vancouver
14:46	Try: Curry 5', 8'; Ravouvou 12'; Con: McGarvey Black (1/2) 8' Knewstubb (0/1)		Try: Olowofela 2'; Edwards 7'; McConnochie 10'; Con: Edwards (2/2) 2', 7'; Mitchell (1/1) 11'	Referee: (Argentina) Damian Schneider

5th Place Final

11 March 2018	Australia	14–31	England	BC Place, Vancouver
17:07	Try: Parahi 7'; Porch 14'; Con: Stannard (2/2) 7', 14'		Try: Mitchell 3'; Bibby 5'; Glover 9'; Norton 10'; Hayter 13'; Con: Mitchell (2/3) 3', 10'; Bibby (1/1) 5'; Edwards (0/1)	Referee: (France) Jérémy Rozier

=== Cup ===
Quarter-finals
11 March 2018 – 11:08 – BC Place, Vancouver
Australia	19
South Africa	24
11 March 2018 – 11:30 – BC Place, Vancouver
Fiji	43
Argentina	7
11 March 2018 – 11:52 – BC Place, Vancouver
New Zealand	0
United States	17
11 March 2018 – 12:14 – BC Place, Vancouver
England	0
Kenya	12

Semi-finals
11 March 2018 – 15:08 – BC Place, Vancouver
South Africa	12
Fiji	15
11 March 2018 – 15:30 – BC Place, Vancouver
United States	19
Kenya	24

Cup Final
11 March 2018 – 18:19 – BC Place, Vancouver
Fiji	31
Kenya	12
Bronze Medal Match
11 March 2018 – 17:52 – BC Place, Vancouver
South Africa	29
United States	7

Matches

Quarter-finals

11 March 2018	Australia	19–24	South Africa	BC Place, Vancouver
11:08	Try: O'Donnell 1'; Connor 4'; Porch 6'; Con: Stannard (2/3) 2', 6'		Try: Soyizwapi 9', 12'; Afrika 13'; Sage 14'; Con: Du Preez (2/4) 12', 14'; Cards: Afrika (yellow card) 3' to 5'	Referee: (New Zealand) Richard Kelly

11 March 2018	Fiji	43–7	Argentina	BC Place, Vancouver
11:30	Try: Sau 1'; Mocenacagi 2'; Nasoko 3'; Kunavula 5', 8'; Naduva 10'; Nasilasila 13'; Con: Ravouvou (3/5) 1', 4', 8'; Nasilasila (1/1) 10'; Cards: Nasoko (yellow card) 14' to 14'		Try: Provenzano 14'; Con: Bazan Velez (1/1) 14'	Referee: (France) Jérémy Rozier

11 March 2018	New Zealand	0–17	United States	BC Place, Vancouver
11:52	Cards: Ravouvou (yellow card) 14' to 14'		Try: Isles 10'; Barrett 13'; Williams 14'; Con: Niua (1/3) 10'	Referee: (Wales) Craig Evans

11 March 2018	England	0–12	Kenya	BC Place, Vancouver
12:14			Try: Ouma 7'; Odhiambo 12'; Con: Oliech (1/1) 7'; Agero (0/1)	Referee: (Portugal) Paulo Duarte

Semi-finals

11 March 2018	South Africa	12–15	Fiji	BC Place, Vancouver
15:08	Try: Snyman 2'; Sage 7'; Con: Du Preez (1/2) 2'		Try: Vakurunabili 3'; Nasoko 10'; Nasilasila 11'; Con: Ravouvou (0/1); Nasilasila (0/2)	Referee: (Wales) Craig Evans

11 March 2018	United States	24–19	Kenya	BC Place, Vancouver
15:30	Try: Baker 2'; Baker 3'; Isles 11'; Con: Niua (2/3) 2', 4'		Try: Oyoo 5', 7'; Ambaka 13'; Ouma 14'; Con: Oliech (1/2) 6'; Agero (1/2) 13'	Referee: (New Zealand) Richard Kelly

Bronze Medal Match

11 March 2018	South Africa	29–7	United States	BC Place, Vancouver
17:52	Try: Davids 4'; Gans 6'; Soyizwapi 7'; Oosthuizen 8', 10'; Con: Du Preez (2/4) 5', 6'; Davids (0/1)		Try: Al-Jiboori 1'; Con: Niua (1/1) 2'	Referee: (New Zealand) Richard Kelly

Cup Final

11 March 2018	Fiji	31–12	Kenya	BC Place, Vancouver
18:19	Try: Vakurunabili 2'; Mocenacagi 7', 8'; Naduva 10'; Dranisinukula 12'; Con: Ravouvou (1/2) 3'; Nasilasila (2/3) 9', 11'		Try: Ambaka 1'; Oliech 6'; Con: Oliech (1/2) 1'	Referee: (South Africa) Craig Joubert

== Tournament placings ==
Place	Team	Points
1st place, gold medalist(s)	Fiji	22
2nd place, silver medalist(s)	Kenya	19
3rd place, bronze medalist(s)	South Africa	17
4	United States	15
5	England	13
6	Australia	12
7	Argentina	10
7	New Zealand	10

Place	Team	Points
9	Scotland	8
10	Spain	7
11	Russia	5
11	Wales	5
13	Samoa	3
14	Canada	2
15	France	1
15	Uruguay	1

Source: World Rugby

== Players ==
=== Scoring leaders ===
Tries scored
Rank	Player	Tries
1	(Australia) John Porch	9
2	(United States) Perry Baker	7
3	(Scotland) Darcy Graham	6
	(Canada) John Moonlight	6
5	(Australia) Ben O'Donnell	5

Points scored
Rank	Player	Points
1	(Canada) Nathan Hirayama	53
2	(Australia) John Porch	45
3	(Australia) James Stannard	37
	(United States) Perry Baker	37
5	(Scotland) Darcy Graham	30

Source: World Rugby

=== Dream Team ===
The following seven players were selected to the tournament Dream Team at the conclusion of the tournament:

Forwards	Backs
(Kenya) Oscar Ouma (South Africa) Dylan Sage (Fiji) Kalione Nasoko	(Kenya) Collins Injera (Australia) John Porch (Fiji) Eroni Sau (United States) Perry Baker

World Sevens Series XIX
Preceded by 2018 USA Sevens	2018 Canada Sevens	Succeeded by 2018 Hong Kong Sevens
Canada Sevens
Preceded by 2017 Canada Sevens	2018 Canada Sevens	Succeeded by 2019 Canada Sevens
