= 2017 Dubai Sevens =

World Rugby Sevens Series tournament

- Sevens World Series XIX
- Host nation: United Arab Emirates
- Date: 1–2 December 2017

Cup
- Champion: South Africa
- Runner-up: New Zealand
- Third: England

Challenge Trophy
- Winner: France

Tournament details
- Matches played: 45
- Tries scored: 266 (average 5.91 per match)
- Most points: (Scotland) Darcy Graham (40) (England) Dan Norton (40) (Uganda) Solomon Okia (40)
- Most tries: (Scotland) Darcy Graham (8) (England) Dan Norton (8) (Uganda) Solomon Okia (8)

The 2017 Dubai Sevens was the first tournament within the 2017–18 World Rugby Sevens Series. It was held over the weekend of 1–2 December 2017 at The Sevens Stadium in Dubai, United Arab Emirates.

== Format ==
The teams were drawn into four pools of four teams each. Every team played each of the other three in their pool once. The top two teams from each pool advance to the Cup bracket where teams compete for the Gold, Silver, and Bronze Medals. The bottom two teams from each group go to the Challenge Trophy bracket.

== Teams ==
Fifteen core teams participate in the tournament along with one invited team, Uganda, the winner of the 2017 Africa Cup Sevens:

- Argentina
- Australia
- Canada
- England
- Fiji
- France
- Kenya
- New Zealand
- Russia
- Samoa
- Scotland
- South Africa
- Spain
- United States
- Wales
- Uganda

== Pool stage ==
All times in UAE Standard Time (UTC+4:00)

Key to colours in group tables
| Teams that advanced to the Cup Quarterfinal |

=== Pool A ===
| Team | Pld | W | D | L | PF | PA | PD | Pts |
|---|---|---|---|---|---|---|---|---|
| South Africa | 3 | 3 | 0 | 0 | 95 | 15 | +80 | 9 |
| Kenya | 3 | 2 | 0 | 1 | 63 | 77 | –14 | 7 |
| Canada | 3 | 1 | 0 | 2 | 37 | 74 | –37 | 5 |
| Uganda | 3 | 0 | 0 | 3 | 41 | 70 | –29 | 3 |

| 1 December 2017 | Canada | 15–29 | Kenya | The Sevens, Dubai |
| 10:30 | Try: Hirayama 1'm Kay 13'm, 14'm Con: Hirayama (0/3) | | Try: Oliech 4'c Injera 5'm, 12'm Ayodi 7'c Ombachi 10'm Con: Oliech (2/3) 4', 7'; Agero (0/2) | Referee: (Argentina) Damian Schneider |

| 1 December 2017 | South Africa | 19–10 | Uganda | The Sevens, Dubai |
| 10:52 | Try: Nel 1'c Snyman 5'c Agaba 11'm Con: Du Preez (2/2) 2', 5'; Afrika (0/1) | | Try: Okia 9'm Wokorach 14'm Con: Wokorach (0/2) | Referee: (Scotland) Sam Grove-White |

| 1 December 2017 | Canada | 22–17 | Uganda | The Sevens, Dubai |
| 14:14 | Try: Kay 2'm Moonlight 6'm Douglas 7'c Jones 11'm Con: Hirayama (1/4) 7' | | Try: Okia 4'c, 9'm, Odong 13'm Con: Wokorach (1/3) 5' | Referee: (England) Richard Haughton |

| 1 December 2017 | South Africa | 48–5 | Kenya | The Sevens, Dubai |
| 14:36 | Try: Senatla 4'm, 5'c, 9'm Afrika 7'm Du Preez 11'c Geduld 12'c Smith 14'm Specman 14'c Con: Du Preez (2/5) 6', 12'; Afrika (2/3) 12', 14' | | Try: Oluoch 2'm Con: Oliech (0/1) | Referee: (Australia) Damon Murphy |

| 1 December 2017 | Kenya | 29–14 | Uganda | The Sevens, Dubai |
| 19:31 | Try: Ombachi 1'c Agero 5'm Sikuta 7'c Ayodi 9'm Tanga 12'm Con: Oliech (2/5) 1', 7' | | Try: Okia 2'c Wokorach 7'c Con: Wokorach (2/2) 3', 7'; Cards: Wokorach (yellow card) 14' to 14' | Referee: (Portugal) Paulo Duarte |

| 1 December 2017 | South Africa | 28–0 | Canada | The Sevens, Dubai |
| 19:53 | Try: Du Preez 4'c Afrika 5'c Smith 10'c Kok 14'c Con: Du Preez (3/3) 4', 6', 10'; Geduld (1/1) 14' | | Cards: Hirayama (yellow card) 13' to 14' | Referee: (New Zealand) Richard Kelly |

=== Pool B ===
| Team | Pld | W | D | L | PF | PA | PD | Pts |
|---|---|---|---|---|---|---|---|---|
| England | 3 | 3 | 0 | 0 | 71 | 12 | +59 | 9 |
| Scotland | 3 | 2 | 0 | 1 | 50 | 64 | –14 | 7 |
| Spain | 3 | 1 | 0 | 2 | 35 | 66 | –31 | 5 |
| France | 3 | 0 | 0 | 3 | 38 | 52 | –14 | 3 |

| 1 December 2017 | Scotland | 24–14 | France | The Sevens, Dubai |
| 11:14 | Try: Graham 1'm, 13'c McLennan 7'c McCann 14'm Con: Lowe (1/2) 7'; Fergusson (1/2) 13' | | Try: Parez 4'c Riva 6'c Con: Barraque 4'; Riva 6' | Referee: (Wales) Craig Evans |

| 1 December 2017 | England | 28–0 | Spain | The Sevens, Dubai |
| 11:36 | Try: Mitchell 6'c, 7'c Norton 12'c Glover 14'c Con: Mitchell (4/4) 6', 7', 12', 14' | | | Referee: (Portugal) Paulo Duarte |

| 1 December 2017 | Scotland | 26–21 | Spain | The Sevens, Dubai |
| 14:58 | Try: Graham 5'm, 8'c, 12'c Elms 10'c Con: Lowe (3/4) 8', 11', 13' | | Try: Pla 3'; Carrion 7'; Sainz-Trapaga 14'; Con: Hernandez (2/2) 4', 7'; Genua (1/1) 14' | Referee: (Argentina) Damian Schneider |

| 1 December 2017 | England | 14–12 | France | The Sevens, Dubai |
| 15:20 | Try: Norton 7'c McConnochie 11'c Con: Mitchell (2/2) 7', 11'; Cards: Rodwell (yellow card) 12' to 14' | | Try: Veredamu 2'm Alerte 14'c Con: Barraque (1/2) 14' | Referee: (New Zealand) Richard Kelly |

| 1 December 2017 | France | 12–14 | Spain | The Sevens, Dubai |
| 20:15 | Try: Demai-Hamecher 10'c, 14'm Con: Riva (1/1) 11'; Barraque (0/1) | | Try: Fontez 3'c Pearce 13'c Con: Genua (2/2) 3', 14'; Cards: Martin (yellow card) 7' to 9' | Referee: (Australia) Damon Murphy |

| 1 December 2017 | England | 29–0 | Scotland | The Sevens, Dubai |
| 20:37 | Try: Mitchell 2'm Norton 6'c, 7'm, 9'm, 11'c Con: Mitchell (1/4) 6'; Edwards (1/1) 11' | | | Referee: (United States) Mike O'Brien |

=== Pool C ===
| Team | Pld | W | D | L | PF | PA | PD | Pts |
|---|---|---|---|---|---|---|---|---|
| Fiji | 3 | 3 | 0 | 0 | 97 | 33 | +64 | 9 |
| Australia | 3 | 2 | 0 | 1 | 104 | 33 | +71 | 7 |
| Wales | 3 | 1 | 0 | 2 | 43 | 64 | –21 | 5 |
| Russia | 3 | 0 | 0 | 3 | 12 | 126 | –114 | 3 |

| 1 December 2017 | Australia | 38–7 | Wales | The Sevens, Dubai |
| 09:44 | Try: Kennewell 2'm O'Donnell 5'c, 13'c Porch 6'c Anderson 7'c Myers 14'm Con: Stannard (3/4) 5', 7', 7', 13' | | Try: Morgan 8'c Con: Davies (1/1) 8'; Cards: Thomas (yellow card) 4' to 6' | Referee: (New Zealand) Richard Kelly |

| 1 December 2017 | Fiji | 50–7 | Russia | The Sevens, Dubai |
| 10:06 | Try: Kunavula 3'm Tuwai 4'm, 9'c Nacuqu 5'c Nasoko 7'c Stewart 11'm Cakaubalavu 13'm Sau 14'c Con: Nacuqu (3/5) 5', 6', 7', 9'; Ravouvou (1/2) 14' | | Try: Filatov 7'c Con: Roshchin (1/1) 7' | Referee: (England) Richard Haughton |

| 1 December 2017 | Australia | 47–0 | Russia | The Sevens, Dubai |
| 12:44 | Try: Porch 1'm Stannard 6'c Quinn 7'c, 10'c Holland 8'c Longbottom 13'c Myers 14'c Con: Stannard (2/3) 6', 7'; Holland (4/4) 9', 10', 13', 14' | | | Referee: (Portugal) Paulo Duarte |

| 1 December 2017 | Fiji | 21–7 | Wales | The Sevens, Dubai |
| 13:06 | Try: Ravouvou 1'c Nasoko 6'c Veremalua 10'c Con: Ravouvou (1/1) 2'c Nasoko (1/1) 6'c Stewart (1/1) 10'c Cards: Domolailai (yellow card) 12' to 14'; Kunavula (yellow card) 13' to 14' | | Try: Devine 13'c Con: Davies (1/1) 13'c | Referee: (South Africa) Rasta Rasivhenge |

| 1 December 2017 | Wales | 29–5 | Russia | The Sevens, Dubai |
| 18:44 | Try: Treharne 2'm, 12'c Thomas 5'c Lewis 7'm, 7'm Con: Jones (2/5) 5', 12' | | Try: Ostroushko 9'm Con: Gostyuzhev (0/1); Cards: Gostyuzhev (yellow card) 10' to 12' | Referee: (United States) Mike O'Brien |

| 1 December 2017 | Fiji | 26–19 | Australia | The Sevens, Dubai |
| 19:06 | Try: Tuwai 4'c Cakaubalavu 7'c Stewart 14'm, 14'c Con: Ravouvou (1/1) 4'; Kunavula (1/1) 7'; Nasilasila (1/2) 14' | | Try: Myers 1'm Kennewell 6'c O'Donnell 10'c Con: Stannard (2/3) 6', 10' | Referee: (South Africa) Craig Joubert |

=== Pool D ===
| Team | Pld | W | D | L | PF | PA | PD | Pts |
|---|---|---|---|---|---|---|---|---|
| New Zealand | 3 | 3 | 0 | 0 | 67 | 43 | +24 | 9 |
| Samoa | 3 | 2 | 0 | 1 | 60 | 50 | +10 | 7 |
| Argentina | 3 | 1 | 0 | 2 | 53 | 57 | –4 | 5 |
| United States | 3 | 0 | 0 | 3 | 40 | 70 | –30 | 3 |

| 1 December 2017 | United States | 14–22 | Argentina | The Sevens, Dubai |
| 09:00 | Try: Tomasin 5'c Isles 9'c Con: Hughes (2/2) 5', 9' | | Try: Luna 2'm Roura 7'c, 12'm Sabato 14'm Con: Revol (1/4) 7' | Referee: (Australia) Damon Murphy |

| 1 December 2017 | New Zealand | 24–12 | Samoa | The Sevens, Dubai |
| 09:22 | Try: Ware 4'm Collier 9'm Curry 11'c Molia 14'c Con: Knewstubb (2/4) 12', 14' | | Try: Mealoi 5'm Tupou 7'c Con: Tupou 7'; Cards: Mealoi (yellow card) 11' to 13' | Referee: (United States) Mike O'Brien |

| 1 December 2017 | United States | 14–26 | Samoa | The Sevens, Dubai |
| 12:00 | Try: Barrett 7'c Unufe 14'c Con: Hughes (1/1) 7'; Unufe (1/1) 14' | | Try: Perez 2'c, 10'c Mealoi 5'm Motuga 13'c Con: Tupou (3/4) 2', 11', 13' | Referee: (South Africa) Rasta Rasivhenge |

| 1 December 2017 | New Zealand | 21–19 | Argentina | The Sevens, Dubai |
| 12:22 | Try: Koroi 7'c Webber 13'c Molia 14'c Con: Knewstubb (1/1) 7'; Koroi (1/1) 14'; Te Tamaki (1/1) 14'; Cards: Koroi (yellow card) 3' to 5'; Webber (yellow card) 8' to 10' | | Try: Roura 4'c Etchart 7'c Revol 11'm Con: Revol (2/2) 4' 7'; Bazan Velez (0/1) | Referee: (South Africa) Craig Joubert |

| 1 December 2017 | Argentina | 12–22 | Samoa | The Sevens, Dubai |
| 18:00 | Try: Gonzalez 7'm, 8'c Con: Bazan Velez (1/2) 9' | | Try: Alosio 2'm, 6'm Motuga 10'c Kellett-Moore 14'm Con: Mealoi (1/2) 10'; Tupou (0/2) | Referee: (Wales) Craig Evans |

| 1 December 2017 | New Zealand | 22–12 | United States | The Sevens, Dubai |
| 18:22 | Try: Molia 2'm, 7'c Ravouvou 11'm 13'm Con: Webber (1/2) 7'; Koroi (0/1); Te Temaki (0/1) | | Try: Isles 4'm Iosefo 8'c Con: Hughes (1/2) 9' | Referee: (Scotland) Sam Grove-White |

== Knockout stage ==
=== 13th place ===
Semi-finals
2 December 2017 – 13:38 – The Sevens, Dubai
United States | 21
Wales | 31
2 December 2017 – 14:00 – The Sevens, Dubai
Uganda | 17 (a.e.t.)
Russia | 12

13th Place Final
2 December 2017 – 17:57 – The Sevens, Dubai
Wales | 26
Uganda | 7

Matches

Semi-finals

| 2 December 2017 | United States | 21–31 | Wales | The Sevens, Dubai |
| 13:38 | Try: Unufe 10'c Isles 12'c Schroeder 14'c Con: Hughes (2/2) 10', 12'; Tomasin 14' | | Try: Jenkins 2'm Lewis 5'c, 7'c, 9'm Morgan 13'c Con: Davies (3/5) 6', 7', 13' | Referee: (Portugal) Paulo Duarte |

| 2 December 2017 | Uganda | 17–12 (a.e.t.) | Russia | The Sevens, Dubai |
| 14:00 | Try: Ijongat 10'm Okia 12'c, 16'; Con: Kermundu (1/2) 12'; Cards: Okia (yellow card) 14' to 14' | | Try: Mysin 14'm Kapalin 14'c Con: Gostyuzhev (1/2) 14' | Referee: (United States) Mike O'Brien |

13th Place Final

| 2 December 2017 | Wales | 26–7 | Uganda | The Sevens, Dubai |
| 17:57 | Try: Talbot-Davies 1'c Lewis 5'c, 9'm, 14'c Con: Davies (3/4) 2', 6', 14' | | Try: Okia 10'c Con: Ofoyrwoth (1/1) 11' | Referee: (South Africa) Rasta Rasivhenge |

=== Challenge Trophy ===
Quarter-finals
2 December 2017 – 09:30 – The Sevens, Dubai
Canada | 10 (a.e.t.)
United States | 5
2 December 2017 – 09:52 – The Sevens, Dubai
Wales | 17
France | 24
2 December 2017 – 10:14 – The Sevens, Dubai
Argentina | 26
Uganda | 7
2 December 2017 – 10:36 – The Sevens, Dubai
Spain | 31
Russia | 0

Semi-finals
2 December 2017 – 14:22 – The Sevens, Dubai
Canada | 21
France | 28
2 December 2017 – 14:44 – The Sevens, Dubai
Argentina | 12
Spain | 14

Challenge Trophy Final
2 December 2017 – 18:19 – The Sevens, Dubai
France | 21
Spain | 12

Matches

Quarter-finals

| 2 December 2017 | Canada | 10–5 (a.e.t.) | United States | The Sevens, Dubai |
| 09:30 | Try: Berna 11'm Douglas 19'; Con: Hirayama (0/1) | | Try: Pinkelman 7'm Con: Hughes (0/1) | Referee: (South Africa) Craig Joubert |

| 2 December 2017 | Wales | 17–24 | France | The Sevens, Dubai |
| 09:52 | Try: Jenkins 2'm Morgan 7'c, 14'm Con: Davies (1/3) 7'; Cards: Thomas (yellow card) 10' to 12' | | Try: Barraque 4'c Alerte 5'c Veredamu 10'm Demai-Hamecher 11'm Con: Riva (2/3) 4', 6'; Parez (0/1) | Referee: (Scotland) Sam Grove-White |

| 2 December 2017 | Argentina | 26–7 | Uganda | The Sevens, Dubai |
| 10:14 | Try: Roura 1'c Arias 4'c Sabato 7'm Etchart 9'c Con: Bazan Velez (3/4) 2', 4', 9' | | Try: Okia 6'c Con: Wokorach (1/1) 6' | Referee: (England) Richard Haughton |

| 2 December 2017 | Spain | 31–0 | Russia | The Sevens, Dubai |
| 10:36 | Try: Carrion 2'c Pla 3'c, 8'm Genua 7'c Martin Beamonte 11'm Con: Genua (3/5) 2', 4', 7' | | | Referee: (Argentina) Damian Schneider |

Semi-finals

| 2 December 2017 | Canada | 21–28 | France | The Sevens, Dubai |
| 14:22 | Try: Mullins 1'c Fuailefau 5'c Moonlight 8'c Con: Hirayama (3/3) 1', 6', 8' | | Try: Demai-Hamecher 3'c Veredamu 7'c, 14'c Berenguel 13'c Con: Riva (2/2) 4', 7'; Parez (1/1) 13'; Barraque (1/1) 14' | Referee: (Argentina) Damian Schneider |

| 2 December 2017 | Argentina | 12–14 | Spain | The Sevens, Dubai |
| 14:44 | Try: Etchart 8'c Sabato 14'm Con: Etchart (1/1) 9' | | Try: Sainz-Trapaga 1'c Carter 13'c Con: Hernandez (2/2) 1', 13' | Referee: (Portugal) Paulo Duarte |

Challenge Trophy Final

| 2 December 2017 | France | 21–12 | Spain | The Sevens, Dubai |
| 18:19 | Try: Riva 3'c, 14'c Demai-Hamecher 4'c Con: Demai-Hamecher (1/1) 3'; Mazzoleni (2/2) 5', Cards: Dall'Igna (yellow card) 7' to 9'; Veredamu (yellow card) 11' to 13' | | Try: Pearce 10'c, 12'm Con: Hernandez (1/2) 10' | Referee: (England) Richard Haughton |

=== 5th place ===
Semi-finals
2 December 2017 – 15:35 – The Sevens, Dubai
Samoa | 27 (a.e.t.)
Scotland | 22
2 December 2017 – 15:57 – The Sevens, Dubai
Kenya | 12
Australia | 19

5th Place Final
2 December 2017 – 18:44 – The Sevens, Dubai
Samoa | 17
Australia | 22

Matches

Semi-finals

| 2 December 2017 | Samoa | 27–22 (a.e.t.) | Scotland | The Sevens, Dubai |
| 15:35 | Try: Toloa 2'm Kellett-Moore 4'm Perez 7'm, 16'; Paulo 8'c Con: Mealoi (1/4) 9' | | Try: Lowe 6'; Graham 11'; McLennan 13'; Farndale 14'; Con: Nayacavou (1/1) 14'; Lowe (0/1); McLennan (0/2) | Referee: (England) Richard Haughton |

| 2 December 2017 | Kenya | 12–19 | Australia | The Sevens, Dubai |
| 15:57 | Try: Wanyama 6'c Oyoo 13'm Con: Oliech (1/1) 7'; Tanga (0/1) | | Try: Anstee 4'm Anderson 8'c Hood 10'c Con: Holland (1/2) 8'; Stannard (1/1) 11' | Referee: (United States) Mike O'Brien |

5th Place Final

| 2 December 2017 | Samoa | 17–22 | Australia | The Sevens, Dubai |
| 18:44 | Try: Tupou 2'm, 11'm Alosio 4'c Con: Mealoi (1/2) 4'; Tupou (0/1) | | Try: Stannard 5'c Kennewell 6'm Anderson 8'm, 13'm Con: Stannard (1/4) 5' | Referee: (New Zealand) Richard Kelly |

=== Cup ===
Quarter-finals
2 December 2017 – 11:00 – The Sevens, Dubai
South Africa | 26
Samoa | 10
2 December 2017 – 11:22 – The Sevens, Dubai
Fiji | 35
Scotland | 24
2 December 2017 – 11:44 – The Sevens, Dubai
New Zealand | 14
Kenya | 12
2 December 2017 – 12:06 – The Sevens, Dubai
England | 26
Australia | 19

Semi-finals
2 December 2017 – 16:19 – The Sevens, Dubai
South Africa | 12
Fiji | 7
2 December 2017 – 16:41 – The Sevens, Dubai
New Zealand | 14
England | 5

Cup Final
2 December 2017 – 19:33 – The Sevens, Dubai
South Africa | 24
New Zealand | 12
Bronze Medal Match
2 December 2017 – 19:08 – The Sevens, Dubai
Fiji | 21
England | 28

Matches

Quarter-finals

| 2 December 2017 | South Africa | 26–10 | Samoa | The Sevens, Dubai |
| 11:00 | Try: Senatla 2'm, 7'c Kok 10'c Agaba 14'c Con: Du Preez (1/2) 7'; Afrika (2/2) 11', 14' | | Try: Selesele 4'm Motuga 9'm Con: Mealoi (0/2) | Referee: (New Zealand) Richard Kelly |

| 2 December 2017 | Fiji | 35–24 | Scotland | The Sevens, Dubai |
| 11:22 | Try: Sau 1'c, 7'c, 10'c Dranisinukula 5'c Nasilasila 6'c Con: Nasilasila (4/4) 1', 5', 6', 7'; Ravouvou (1/1) 10'; Cards: Sau (yellow card) 5' to 7' | | Try: Graham 2'c, 5'm Farndale 9'c Fergusson 13'm Con: Lowe (2/4) 3', 9' | Referee: (Wales) Craig Evans |

| 2 December 2017 | New Zealand | 14–12 | Kenya | The Sevens, Dubai |
| 11:44 | Try: Collier 2'c Knewstubb 14'c Con: Koroi (1/1) 2'; Knewstubb 14' | | Try: Agero 4'c Oliech 5'm Con: Oliech (1/2) 4' | Referee: (Australia) Damon Murphy |

| 2 December 2017 | England | 26–19 | Australia | The Sevens, Dubai |
| 12:06 | Try: Norton 3'm, 7'c Mitchell 9'c Glover 14'c Con: Mitchell (1/2) 7', 9', 14' | | Try: Kennewell 1'm Killingworth 6'c Longbottom 11'c Con: Stannard (1/2) 6'; Porch (1/1) 11' | Referee: (South Africa) Rasta Rasivhenge |

Semi-finals

| 2 December 2017 | South Africa | 12–7 | Fiji | The Sevens, Dubai |
| 16:19 | Try: Afrika 2'm Senatla 6'c Con: Afrika (1/2) 7' | | Try: Tuwai 13'c Con: Nasilasila (1/1) 13'c | Referee: (Scotland) Sam Grove-White |

| 2 December 2017 | New Zealand | 14–5 | England | The Sevens, Dubai |
| 16:41 | Try: Ravouvou 10'c, 13'c Con: Knewstubb (2/2) 11', 14' | | Try: McConnochie 2'm Con: Mitchell (0/1) | Referee: (South Africa) Craig Joubert |

Bronze Medal Match

| 2 December 2017 | Fiji | 21–28 | England | The Sevens, Dubai |
| 19:08 | Try: Nasilasila 3'c Ravouvou 5'c Vakurunabili 12'c Con: Nasilasila (3/3) 4', 5', 13' | | Try: Bowen 1'c, 8'c Burgess 6'c McConnochie 7'c Con: Edwards (4/4) 2' 7', 7', 9' | Referee: (Wales) Craig Evans |

Cup Final

| 2 December 2017 | South Africa | 24–12 | New Zealand | The Sevens, Dubai |
| 19:33 | Try: Snyman 2'c Senatla 4'm Smith 5'c Agaba 14'm Con: Du Preez (2/3) 3', 5'; Geduld (0/1); Cards: Specman (yellow card) 10' to 12' | | Try: Knewstubb 11'c Curry 13'm Con: Knewstubb (1/2) 11'; Cards: Ravouvou (yellow card) 2' to 4' | Referee: (Australia) Damon Murphy |

== Tournament placings ==
| Place | Team | Points |
|---|---|---|
| 1st place, gold medalist(s) | South Africa | 22 |
| 2nd place, silver medalist(s) | New Zealand | 19 |
| 3rd place, bronze medalist(s) | England | 17 |
| 4 | Fiji | 15 |
| 5 | Australia | 13 |
| 6 | Samoa | 12 |
| 7 | Kenya | 10 |
| 7 | Scotland | 10 |

| Place | Team | Points |
|---|---|---|
| 9 | France | 8 |
| 10 | Spain | 7 |
| 11 | Canada | 5 |
| 11 | Argentina | 5 |
| 13 | Wales | 3 |
| 14 | Uganda | 2 |
| 15 | Russia | 1 |
| 15 | United States | 1 |

Source: World Rugby

== Players ==
=== Scoring leaders ===
Tries scored
| Rank | Player | Tries |
|---|---|---|
| 1 | (England) Dan Norton | 8 |
| | (Scotland) Darcy Graham | 8 |
| | (Uganda) Solomon Okia | 8 |
| 4 | (South Africa) Seabelo Senatla | 7 |
| | (Wales) Tomi Lewis | 7 |

Points scored
| Rank | Player | Points |
|---|---|---|
| 1 | (England) Dan Norton | 40 |
| 2 | (Scotland) Darcy Graham | 40 |
| 3 | (Uganda) Solomon Okia | 40 |
| | (England) Tom Mitchell | 37 |
| 5 | (South Africa) Seabelo Senatla | 35 |

Source: World Rugby

=== Dream Team ===
The following seven players were selected to the tournament Dream Team at the conclusion of the tournament:

| Forwards | Backs |
|---|---|
| (Samoa) Alamanda Motuga (England) James Rodwell (South Africa) Kwagga Smith | (South Africa) Seabelo Senatla (Scotland) Darcy Graham (South Africa) Cecil Afrika (New Zealand) Joe Ravouvou |

== See also ==
- 2017 Dubai Women's Sevens

World Sevens Series XIX
| Preceded by None (first event) | 2017 Dubai Sevens | Succeeded by 2017 South Africa Sevens |
Dubai Sevens
| Preceded by 2016 Dubai Sevens | 2017 Dubai Sevens | Succeeded by 2018 Dubai Sevens |
