= Justin Douglas =

Justin Douglas may refer to

- Justin Douglas (field hockey)
- Justin Douglas (rugby)
