= Ben O'Donnell =

Australian rugby union player

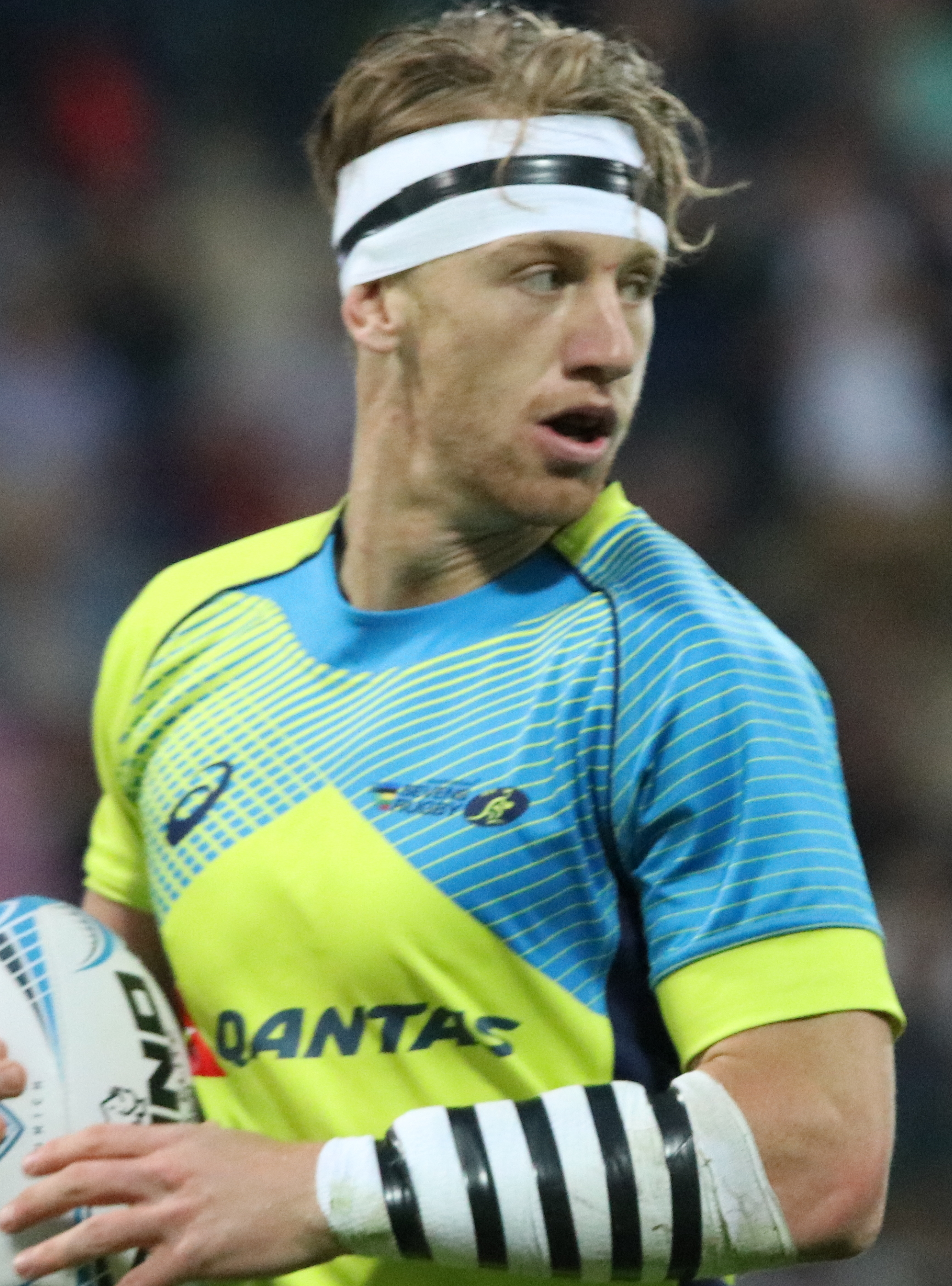
- O'Donnell with the Australia sevens team in 2017
- Born: 14 August 1995 (age 31) Sydney, New South Wales, Australia
- Height: 188 cm (6 ft 2 in)
- Weight: 92 kg (203 lb; 14 st 7 lb)
- School: Waverley College

Rugby union career
- Position(s): Centre, Wing, Fullback
- Current team: Aurillac
Senior career
Years	Team	Apps	(Points)
2017	Randwick	1	(5)
2020–2022	Connacht	7	(0)
2023–2025	Brumbies	9	(25)
2024	Hawke's Bay	11	(25)
2025–	Aurillac	0	(0)
- Correct as of 15 June 2025
National sevens team
Years	Team		Comps
2017–2020	Australia		21
- Correct as of 10 January 2021

Ben O'Donnell (born 14 August 1995) is an Australian rugby union player, who currently plays as a wing for French Pro D2 club Aurillac.

He previously played for Connacht in the Pro14 and European Rugby Champions Cup, the Brumbies in Super Rugby and for Hawke's Bay in New Zealand's domestic National Provincial Championship competition.

O’Donnell has represented the Australia national rugby sevens team from 2017 to 2020 at 21 competitions.

In mid-2025, O'Donnell left the Brumbies at the end of his contract and signed with French Pro D2 club Aurillac on a two-year deal.
