= Rasta Rasivhenge =

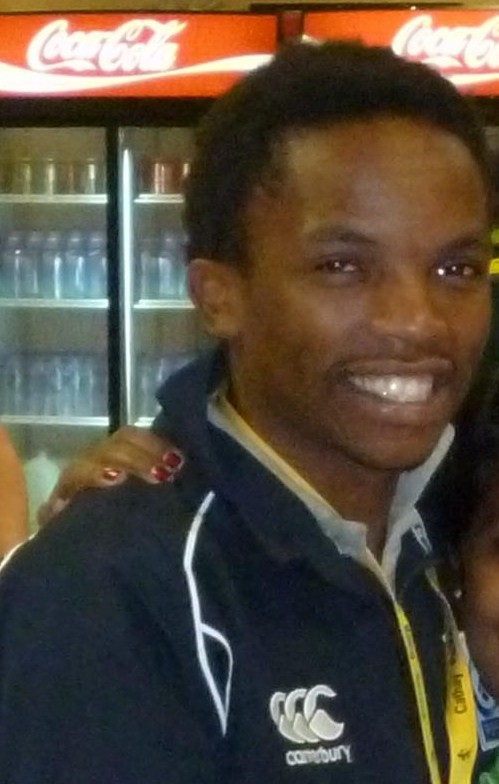
- Born: Fhatuwani Rasivhenge; January 3, 1986 (age 40) Johannesburg, South Africa
- Height: 1.69 m (5 ft 6 1/2 in)
- Weight: 68 kg (10 st 10 lb)
- School: Bishop Bavin Primary; Jeppe High School for Boys
- University: University of the Witwatersrand; UNISA
- Occupation: Referee

Rugby union career
- Position: Referee
Refereeing career
Years	Competition	Apps
2010–2014	Vodacom Cup	20
2011–2013	Varsity Cup	8
2011–2014	Currie Cup	20
2011–present	IRB Sevens World Series	
2014	2014 Commonwealth Games	
2015–present	Top 14	
2016	2016 Summer Olympics	
2016–present	Super Rugby	
2017–present	Pro14	

Fhatuwani 'Rasta' Rasivhenge (born in Johannesburg on 3 January 1986) is a South African rugby union referee who is a member of the South African Rugby Union (SARU) Premier Panel. He was appointed to referee the final of the rugby sevens tournament at the 2016 Summer Olympics.

== Career ==
Rasivhenge has been a regular referee on the IRB Sevens World Series circuit since the 2011–12 season and also refereed in South African domestic rugby union competitions, the Currie Cup, Vodacom Cup and Varsity Cup since 2010.

Rasivhenge was also a rugby sevens referee during the 2014 Commonwealth Games in Glasgow, Scotland.

In 2014, Rasivhenge took a sabbatical from the South African Rugby Union and was recruited by the Australian Rugby Union; he subsequently appeared as an Australian referee in the IRB Sevens World Series.

He returned to South Africa prior to the 2015 Currie Cup Premier Division and signed a contract with SARU until 2019. He refereed eight matches in the 2015 Currie Cup Premier Division and was awarded the final between the Golden Lions and Western Province, in the process becoming the youngest referee ever to do so.

He was also appointed to referee two matches in the French professional leagues in 2015–16 – a Pro D2 match between Béziers and Biarritz and a Top 14 match between Toulouse and Grenoble.

In 2016, Rasivhenge was added to the referees' roster for the 2016 Super Rugby season for the first time.

Rasivhenge was also selected as a referee for the 2016 Olympic Games in Rio De Janeiro, Brazil. At the games, he was appointed to referee the final of the games between England and Fiji, won by the Fijians 41-7.
