= Seabelo Senatla =

South African rugby union player

- Full name: Seabelo Mohanoe Senatla
- Born: 10 February 1993 (age 33) Welkom, South Africa
- Height: 1.77 m (5 ft 9 1/2 in)
- Weight: 88 kg (194 lb; 13 st 12 lb)
- School: Riebeeckstad High School, Welkom
- University: Central University of Technology

Rugby union career
- Position: Winger
- Current team: Stormers / Western Province
Youth career
- 2009–2011: Griffons
- 2012: Free State Cheetahs
Amateur team(s)
Years	Team	Apps	(Points)
2012	CUT Ixias	3	(0)
Senior career
Years	Team	Apps	(Points)
2014–present	Stormers	74	(115)
2014–present	Western Province	45	(125)
- Correct as of 23 July 2022
International career
Years	Team	Apps	(Points)
2013–2018	South Africa Sevens	203	(1,120)
2013	South Africa Under-20	5	(35)
2017	South Africa 'A'	1	(0)
- Correct as of 15 November 2018
Medal record
Men's rugby sevens
Representing South Africa
Olympic Games
Bronze medal – third place	2016 Rio de Janeiro	Team competition
Commonwealth Games
Gold medal – first place	2014 Glasgow	Team competition
World Games
Gold medal – first place	2013 Cali	Team competition

Seabelo Mohanoe Senatla (born 10 February 1993) is a South African rugby union player for Stormers in URC and Champions Cup and Western Province in the Currie Cup. His regular position is winger.

Senatla was a member of the South Africa Sevens team that won a bronze medal at the 2016 Summer Olympics. (Note: Despite being a member of the South African Sevens team at the 2016 Summer Olympics, Senatla missed the bronze medal game due to injury and did not receive a medal. His replacement Francois Hougaard was awarded the medal instead, but announced via his Twitter account that he gave his medal to Senatla.)

== Career ==
=== Youth ===
Senatla was born in Welkom, South Africa. Playing schoolboy rugby for Riebeeckstad High School in Welkom, Senatla earned selection in the Griffons side that played at the Under-16 Grant Khomo Week tournament in 2009, as well as the Under-18 Academy Week tournament in 2010. He was also a member of the Griffons U19 side that played in the 2011 Under-19 Provincial Championship, scoring four tries in eight starts.

In 2012, Senatla moved to Bloemfontein, where he played for university side CUT Ixias during the 2012 Varsity Shield competition. He helped them finish top of the log and played in the final, where they lost 19–17 to Wits. His impressive try-scoring form for the Free State U19 side during the 2012 Under-19 Provincial Championship – scoring seven tries in eight starts, which included two hat-tricks against SWD U19 and the Leopards U19 – saw him make the step up to the Free State U21 side, scoring one try in five appearances during the 2012 Under-21 Provincial Championship.

=== Rugby sevens ===
Senatla also caught the attention of the Blitzbokke and he signed a two-year contract with SARU to play for them on the IRB Sevens World Series circuit for in 2013 and 2014. He debuted at the 2013 Wellington Sevens tournament and played in five tournaments during the 2012–13 IRB Sevens World Series. He also represented them at the 2013 Rugby World Cup Sevens as they were knocked out in the quarter-finals, before being part of the squad that won gold at the 2013 World Games in Cali.

In December 2013, Senatla extended his contract with SARU until December 2016. He featured in a further five tournaments during the 2013–14 IRB Sevens World Series and topped the try-scoring charts for the Blitzbokke, scoring 29 tries during the season.

=== Junior World Championship ===
Senatla was selected in the South Africa Under-20 side that played in the 2013 IRB Junior World Championship in France. He scored four tries in their opening match, a 97–0 victory over the United States. He got another two tries in their 31–24 victory over eventual champions England, and played in their match against hosts France. He played in their semi-final clash with Wales, where South Africa suffered an 18–17 defeat. He was also in the run-on side that met New Zealand in the third-placed play-off and scored one of six South African tries as they beat New Zealand 41–34 to secure third-place.

=== Western Province / Stormers ===
The contract that Senatla signed with SARU in December 2013 also allowed him to play for Western Province in the Currie Cup competition. In July 2014, he was selected on the bench for the 2014 Super Rugby match between the Stormers (the Super Rugby franchise aligned with Western Province) for their second-last match of the season against the Bulls in Cape Town. Senatla played in and won the 2014 Currie Cup final.

=== 2016 Summer Olympics ===
Senatla was included in a 12-man squad for the 2016 Summer Olympics in Rio de Janeiro. He was named in the starting line-up for their first match in Group B of the competition against Spain, scoring a try as South Africa won the match 24–0.
