= James Stannard =

Australian rugby union player

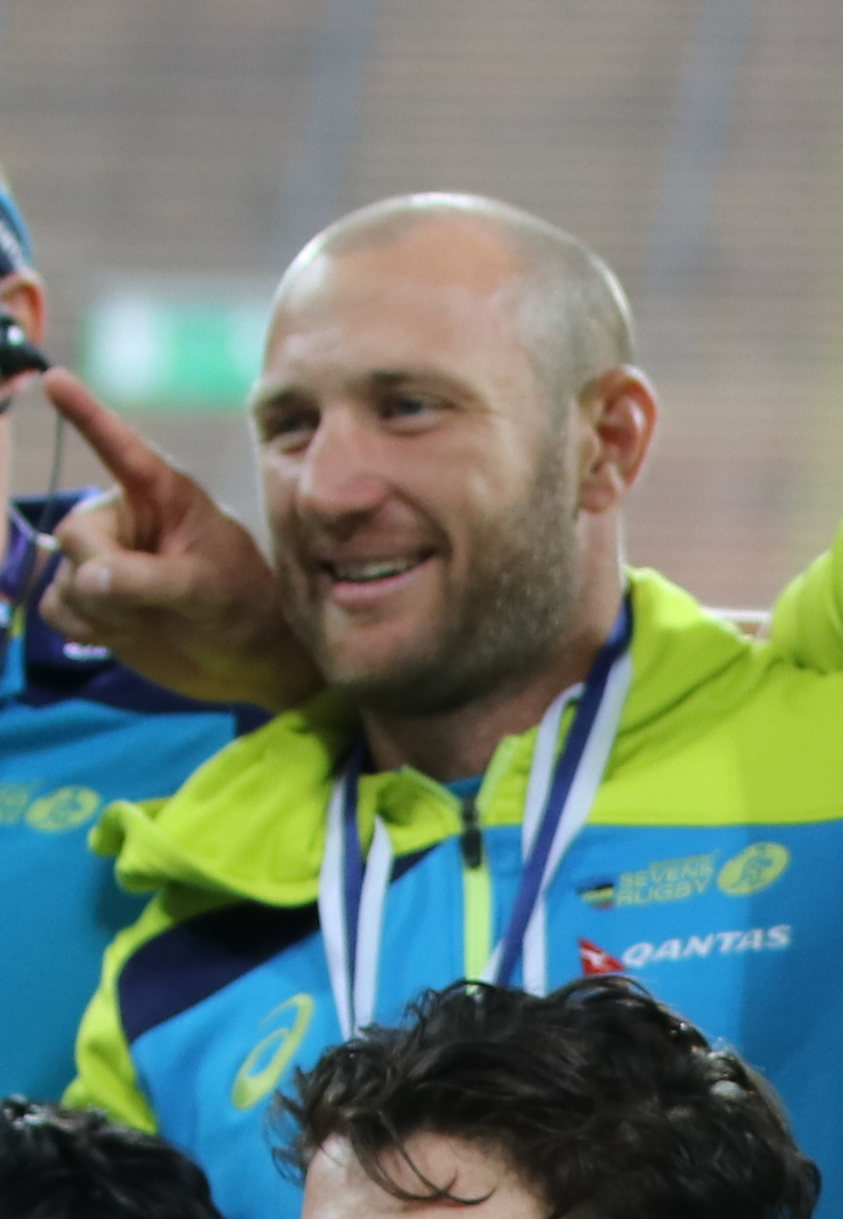
- Stannard with Australia Sevens in 2017
- Born: 21 February 1983 (age 43) Brisbane, Queensland, Australia
- Height: 1.74 m (5 ft 9 in)
- Weight: 82 kg (12 st 13 lb; 181 lb)
- School: St Edmund's College, Ipswich
- Notable relative: Melissa Wu (cousin)

Rugby union career
- Position(s): Scrum-half, Fly-half
Senior career
Years	Team	Apps	(Points)
2007	Perth Spirit	3	(7)
Super Rugby
Years	Team	Apps	(Points)
2008	Force	10	(5)
2009–2010	Brumbies	2	(0)
2011–2012	Force	19	(79)
- Correct as of 14 April 2012
Coaching career
- Years: Team
- 2024–: Western Force (assistant)
Medal record
Men's rugby sevens
Representing Australia
Commonwealth Games
Silver medal – second place	2010 Delhi	Team competition

James Stannard (born 21 February 1983) is an Australian former rugby union footballer. He can play as a scrum-half or fly-half. He previously played for the Western Force and Brumbies Super Rugby.

Stannard was an Australia sevens player and was awarded the 2010 Australian Sevens Player of the Year award. He competed at the 2016 Summer Olympics.

Stannard is currently part of the coaching staff for the Women's Aussie 7s rugby team.

== Injury and retirement ==
On 30 March 2018, Stannard received a fractured skull in an altercation with a 23 year old English tourist, Sam Oliver. The two men had left a Sydney bar at 3am with the altercation ensuing outside a kebab shop. Stannard was knocked unconscious from a single punch during the incident and hit his head on the concrete floor. Following his head injury, Stannard has suffered from vertigo.

In June 2018, Stannard was forced to retire from playing rugby due to the head injuries he received in the altercation.

Sam Oliver claimed that he retaliated in self-defence after Stannard had approached him, made an offensive remark, and initially punched Oliver's left eye. In September 2018, following a two-and-a-half day hearing, Oliver was found not guilty of recklessly causing grievous bodily harm.
