= Nathan Hirayama =

Canadian rugby union and sevens player

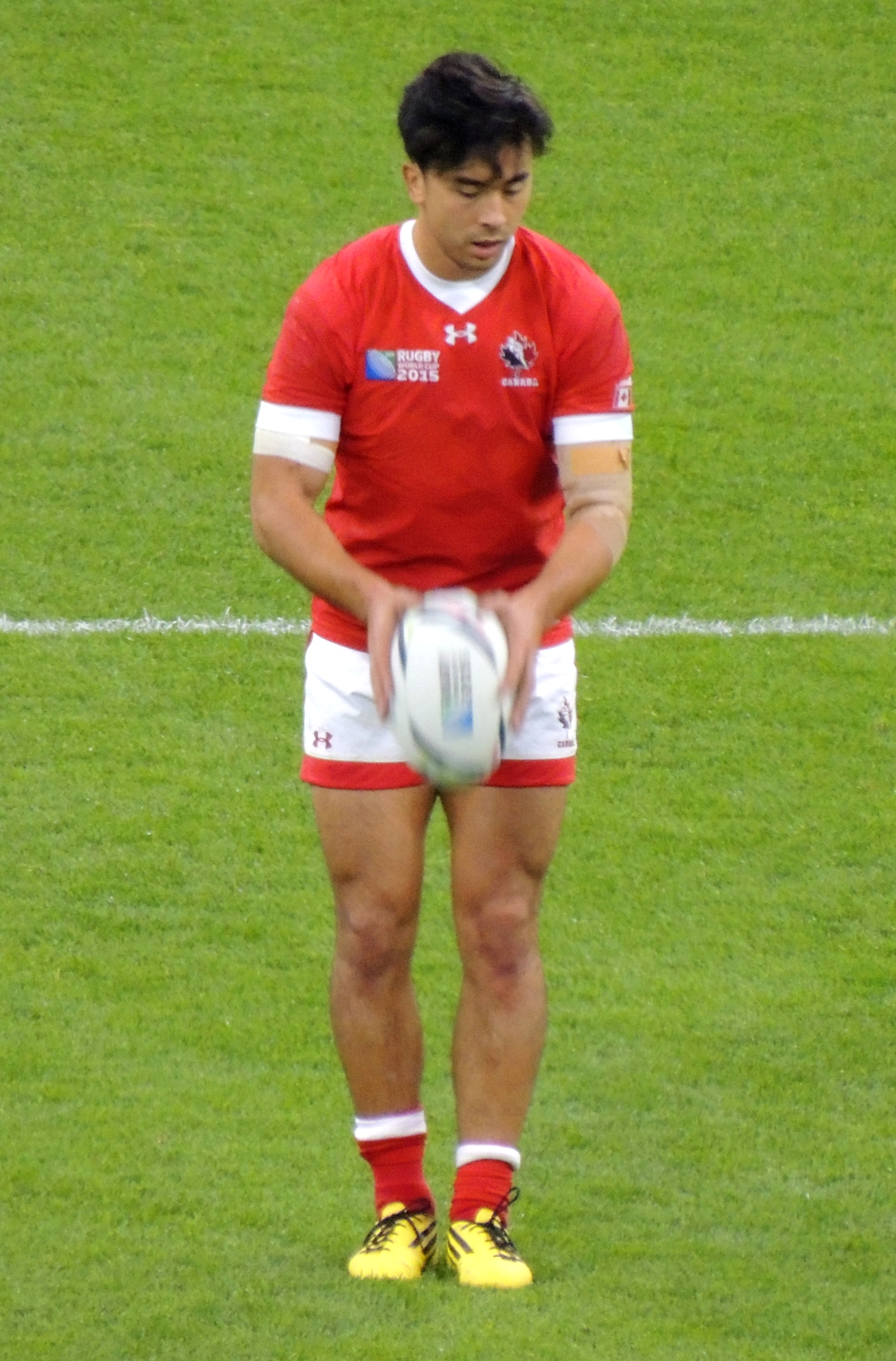
- Hirayama at the 2015 Rugby World Cup
- Born: Nathan Hirayama; 23 March 1988 (age 38) Richmond, British Columbia, Canada
- Height: 183 cm (6 ft 0 in)
- Weight: 88 kg (13 st 12 lb; 194 lb)
- School: McRoberts Secondary School
- University: University of Victoria

Rugby union career
- Position: Fly-half / Fullback
Amateur team(s)
Years	Team	Apps	(Points)
2009–2013	University of Victoria		
2007–	British Columbia		
International career
Years	Team	Apps	(Points)
2008	Canada U20	5	(27)
2008–2015	Canada	23	(47)
- Correct as of 9 September 2021
National sevens team
Years	Team		Comps
2006–2021	Canada Sevens		272
Medal record
Men's rugby sevens
Representing Canada
Pan American Games
Gold medal – first place	2011 Guadalajara	Team
Gold medal – first place	2015 Toronto	Team
Silver medal – second place	2019 Lima	Team

Nathan Hirayama (born 23 March 1988) is a Canadian former rugby player. His primary position was fly-half, however, but he also played fullback. He played for both the Canadian national team and the Canadian sevens team. At club level, Hirayama played for the University of Victoria in the British Columbian Premiership and the BC Bears in the Canadian Rugby Championship.

== National team ==
=== Fifteens ===
Hirayama was selected for the Canadian national team to attend the 2007, 2011 and 2015 Rugby World Cups, although he did not play any games in 2007. He appeared as a substitute two of Canada's four 2011 World Cup group stage matches. He was Canada's starting fly-half for the 2015 World Cup, playing in all four group stage matches and recording 20 points.

=== Sevens ===
Hirayama debuted for the Canadian sevens team in the 2006 Dubai Sevens in the IRB Sevens World Series at age 18. Two years later he debuted for the Canadian national men's team against Portugal in Lisbon. He was selected for the 2013 Rugby World Cup Sevens in Russia helping Canada to win the Plate competition and finishing as the tournament's top scorer with 49 points. Hirayama was a part of Canada's rugby sevens team at the 2010, 2014, and 2018 Commonwealth Games. Hirayama has also competed at the Pan American Games, winning gold in 2011 and 2015, and silver in 2019.

In June 2021, Hirayama was named to Canada's 2020 Summer Olympics team. He will be Canada's flag-bearer at the opening ceremony games alongside Miranda Ayim. He announced his retirement from all forms of rugby in September 2021. At the time of his retirement, he was ranked third on the HSBC World Rugby Sevens Series all-time points-scoring list, with 1859 total points.

== Personal life ==
Hirayama is of Japanese Canadian descent and was born in Richmond, British Columbia, as were both his parents. Hirayama's father, Garry Hirayama, also represented Canada in both codes of the game in the 1980s, winning 12 caps as fly-half for the national team, and was also part of Canada's first sevens team to travel to Hong Kong. Together they are the first-ever rugby-playing father-son duo for Canada.

Olympic Games
Preceded by Tessa Virtue; Scott Moir	Flagbearer for Canada (with Miranda Ayim); Tokyo 2020	Succeeded by Marie-Philip Poulin; Charles Hamelin
