= Justin Douglas (rugby union) =

Canadian rugby player

Personal information
- Born: May 5, 1994 (age 32) Matsqui, British Columbia, Canada
- Height: 189 cm (6 ft 2 in)
- Weight: 93 kg (205 lb)
Medal record
Men's Rugby sevens
Representing Canada
Pan American Games
Gold medal – first place	2015 Toronto	Team

Justin Douglas (born April 5, 1994) is a Canadian rugby union player, in the sevens discipline. Douglas was part of Canada's 2014 Commonwealth Games and 2018 Commonwealth Games, with both teams getting knocked out in the group stage. Douglas won gold as part of Canada's team at the 2015 Pan American Games in Toronto. In June 2021, Douglas was named to Canada's 2020 Olympic team.
