= 2018 Rugby Africa season =

18th Africa Cup
Final positions
- Champions: Namibia
- Runner-up: Kenya

The 2018 Rugby Africa season contains a series of rugby union tournaments scheduled for 2018 and organised by the governing body of rugby union in Africa, Rugby Africa. The top-tier event is the Rugby Africa Gold Cup – formerly simply known as the Africa Cup – a six-team competition which was played on a round-robin basis from May to August 2018.

Location of teams in the 2018 Rugby Africa Gold, Silver and Bronze Cups
Gold Cup
Silver Cup
Bronze Cup

== Teams ==
The following teams will take part in the 2018 Rugby Africa season.

Rankings are taken from the start of each division

Gold Cup			Silver Cup			Bronze Cup		
Team	2017 position	WR Rank	Team	2017 position	WR Rank	Team	2017 position	WR Rank
Kenya	2nd Gold Cup	28	Algeria	1st Bronze Cup	N/A	Ghana	1st RC West 1	93
Morocco	1st Silver Cup	38	Botswana	4th Silver Cup	67	Lesotho	1st RC South	N/A
Namibia	1st Gold Cup	24	Ivory Coast	2nd Silver Cup	50	Mauritius	4th Bronze Cup	90
Tunisia	4th Gold Cup	42	Madagascar	3rd Silver Cup	46	Rwanda	3rd Bronze Cup	91
Uganda	3rd Gold Cup	37	Senegal	6th Gold Cup	49			
Zimbabwe	5th Gold Cup	44	Zambia	2nd Bronze Cup	78			

== Gold Cup ==
2018 Rugby Africa Gold Cup
- Countries: Kenya; Morocco; Namibia; Tunisia; Uganda; Zimbabwe
- Date: 16 June – 18 August 2018

The 2018 edition of the Rugby Africa Gold Cup will be played by the national teams of Namibia, Kenya, Uganda, Morocco, Zimbabwe and Tunisia. The competition will be played in a league format with 15 home or away matches (dependent on their 2017 league position) between the 16th of June and the 18th of August 2018. Points accumulated for the 2018 edition are as follows:

Victory: 4 points + 1 bonus point for winning by three tries or more.
Draw: 2 points
Loss: 0 point + 1 bonus point for losing by 7 points or less

This year's edition also doubles as qualification for the 2019 Rugby World Cup. The first place team will qualify for the World Cup directly, while the 2nd place team will qualify for the Repechage competition. All others will be eliminated from World Cup contention.

=== Standings ===
Standings for the Gold Cup are:

2018 Rugby Africa Gold Cup
Pos	Team	Pl	W	D	L	PF	PA	PD	BP	Pts
1	Namibia	5	5	0	0	347	69	+278	5	25
2	Kenya	5	4	0	1	206	135	+71	1	17
3	Uganda	5	2	0	3	160	172	-12	1	9
4	Tunisia	5	2	0	3	66	279	-213	3	9
5	Zimbabwe	5	1	1	3	139	162	-23	3	8
6	Morocco	5	0	1	4	99	197	-98	1	3
* Legend: Pos = Position, Pl = Played, W = Won, D = Drawn, L = Lost, PF = Points for, PA = Points against, PD = Points difference, Pts = Log points.

=== Matches ===
16 June 2018	Namibia	55-6	Uganda	Hage Geingob Stadium, Windhoek
16:00	Try: Janco Venter 7'; Johan Deysel 14', 29'; Obert Nortjé 19'; Louis van der Westhuizen 48', 75'; Wian Conradie 55'; JC Greyling 58'; Chrysander Botha 68'; Con: Cliven Loubser (4/8) 8', 15', 20', 56'; PW Steenkamp (1/1) 76'	WR Report; RA Report	Pen: James Ijongat (2/3) 35', 53'; Cards: Saul Kivumbi (yellow card) 18' to 28'	Attendance: 3,000; Referee: Cwengile Jadeweni

16 June 2018	Zimbabwe	23-23	Morocco	Machinery Exchange Rugby Stadium, Harare
13:30	Try: Shingi Katsvere 10', 28'; Con: Lenience Tambwera (2/2) 11', 29'; Pen: Lenience Tambwera (3/6) 59', 65', 72'	WR Report; RA Report	Try: Jaoudat Souheyl 30'; Qadiri Karim 67'; Con: Hmdouch Chakir (2/2) 31', 67'; Pen: Hmdouch Chakir (3/5) 7', 36', 40'	Attendance: 5,000; Referee: Quinton Imellman

23 June 2018	Namibia	118-0	Tunisia	Hage Geingob Rugby Stadium, Windhoek
16:00	Try: Lesley Klim 2', 14', 44', 63'; Johan Deysel 10'; Chrysander Botha 21', 51', 70'; Max Katjijeko 27'; Wian Conradie 30' penalty try 34'; JC Greyling 36', 42', 60', 76'; PJ van Lill 66'; Damian Stevens 78'; Johann Tromp 80+1'; Con: Cliven Loubser 3', 11', 15', 27', 31', 43', 52', 61'; PW Steenkamp 67', 70', 77', 79'; Chrysander Botha 80+2'; Cards: Rohan Kitshoff (yellow card) 58' to 68'	Report	Cards: Hossem Khalfi (yellow card) 26' to 36'	Attendance: 2,000; Referee: Quinton Immelman

23 June 2018	Morocco	24-28	Kenya	Stade du C.O.C., Casablanca
17:00	Try: Fahd Rguibi Idrissi 11'; Salim Boukanoucha 28'; Hocine Arabat 48'; Frank Nassik 71'; Con: Hmdouch Chakir (1/3) 49'; Bryan Brichet (1/1) 72'	Report	Try: Biko Adema 3'; Tony Onyango 51', 65'; Moses Amusala 57'; Con: Darwin Mukidza (4/4) 4', 52', 58', 65'; Cards: Edmund Anya (yellow card) 74' to 80'	Attendance: 800; Referee: (France) Sebastien Minery

30 June 2018	Kenya	45-36	Zimbabwe	RFUEA Ground, Nairobi
15:00	Try: Davis Chenge 4', 13', 17'; Tony Onyango 20'; Penalty Try 36'; Martin Owilla 79'; Dalmus Chityui 80+2'; Con: Darwin Mukidza 5', 14', 19', 80+3'; Cards: Peter Kilonzo (yellow card) 45' to 55'	Report	Try: Tapfuma Parirenyatna 10'; Denford Mutamangira 26'; David Makanda 40+4'; Farai Mudariki 41'; Penalty Try 45'; Matthew Mcivab 54'; Con: Lenience Tambwera 28', 55'; Cards: Fortunate Chipendo (yellow card) 34' to 40+4'	Attendance: 5,000; Referee: Tual Trainini

30 June 2018	Morocco	7-63	Namibia	Stade du C.O.C., Casablanca
16:00	Try: Qadiri Karim 47'; Con: Hmiddouch Chakir 48'; Cards: Dikhal Bilal (red card) 45'	Report	Try: Aranos Coetzee 7'; PJ van Lill 11'; Janco Venter 19', 70'; Justin Newman 30', 38' penalty try 46'; Cliven Loubser 54', 78'; Con: Cliven Loubser 8', 12', 20', 31', 39', 55', 71', 78'	Attendance: 600; Referee: Adrien Descottes (France)

7 July 2018	Kenya	38-22	Uganda	RFUEA Ground, Nairobi
15:00	Try: Jacob Ojee 6'; Davis Chenge 20'; Samson Onsomu 28'; Felix Ayange 36'; Moses Amusala 80+1'; Con: Darwin Mukidza 8', 21', 29', 37', 80+2'; Pen: Darwin Mukidza 49'; Cards: Andrew Chogo (yellow card) 63' to 73'	Report	Try: Philip Wokorach 14', 71'; Ivan Magomu 45'; Michael Okorach 62'; Con: Philip Wokorach 46'	Attendance: 3,200; Referee: Quinton Immelman

7 July 2018	Tunisia	18-14	Zimbabwe	Stade Mustapha Ben Jannet, Monastir
16:00	Try: Mohamed Mliss 24'; Issam Werhani 61'; Con: Mohamed Ali Gafsi 61'; Pen: Mohamed Ali Gafsi 57'; Drop: Mohamed Ali Gafsi 80'; Cards: Heythem Chelly (yellow card) 42' to 52'; Hichem Mokni (yellow card) 69' to 79'	Report	Try: Lenience Tambwagra 28'; Brendon Mandivenga 51'; Con: Lenience Tambwagra 29', 51'; Cards: Kudzai Mashawi (yellow card) 55' to 65'	Attendance: 2,000; Referee: Jonathan Dufort (France)

4 August 2018	Uganda	67-12	Tunisia	Kyadondo Rugby Club, Kampala
15:00	Try: Robert Masendi 33'; Micheal Okorach 36'; Asuman Mugerwa 39', 40'32"; Philip Wokorach 54', 56', 65'; Solomon Okia 69'; Ian Munyani 78'; Con: Philip Wokorach (8/9) 33', 40', 41', 55', 56', 66', 69', 78'; Pen: Philip Wokorach 24', 29'; Cards: Paul Sekate (yellow card) 18' to 28'	Report	Try: Hossem Khalfi 4'; Mohamed Achref Dhif 62'; Con: Mohamed Achref Dhif 63'; Cards: Mohamed Ben Abdallah (yellow card) 28' to 38'	Attendance: 4,000; Referee: Rasta Rasivhenge (South Africa)

4 August 2018	Zimbabwe	28-58	Namibia	Police Grounds, Harare
	Try: Connor Pritchard 9'; Tafadzwa Chitokwindo 50'; Matthew Mandiona 54'; Shayne Makombe 73'; Con: Brendon Mandivenga 10', 52'; Lenience Tambwera 54', 74'	Report	Try: Lesley Klim 2'; P. J. van Lill 24'; J. C. Greyling 29'; Wian Conradie 42'; Torsten van Jaarsveld 52'; Tjiuee Uanivi 71'; Louis van der Westhuizen 78'; Johann Tromp 80'; Con: Cliven Loubser (5/6) 4', 25', 31', 43', 72'; P. W. Steenkamp (1/2) 78'; Pen: Cliven Loubser 16', 40'; Cards: J. C. Greyling (yellow card) 53' to 63'	Attendance: 3,500; Referee: Egon Seconds (South Africa)

11 August 2018	Uganda	47-29	Morocco	Kyadondo Rugby Club, Kampala
16:00	Try: Pius Ogena 6', 70'; Micheal Okorach 36'; Ivan Magomu 38'; Solomon Okia 80'; Con: Philip Wokorach 10', 37', 39', 71', 80'; Pen: Philip Wokorach 2', 24', 34', 49'	Report	Try: Abderrahim Azelmad 21'; Houcine Amraoui 41'; Samir Jnaour 45', 58'; Con: Naoufal El Kadri (3/4) 22', 46', 59'; Pen: Naoufal El Kadri 65'	Attendance: 2,000; Referee: Rasta Rasivhenge (South Africa)

11 August 2018	Kenya	67-0	Tunisia	RFUEA Ground, Nairobi
14:00	Try: Willy Ambaka 4', 78'; Davis Chenge 20'; Andrew Chogo 22'; Jacob Ojee 26'; Elkeans Musonye 30'; Darwin Mukidza 35'; Martin Owilah 40'17"; Peter Karia 54'; Mohamed Omollo 65'; Tony Onyango 73'; Con: Darwin Mukidza (5/6) 5', 20', 23', 28', 31'; Mohamed Omollo (1/4) 66'; Cards: Hillary Mwanjilwa (yellow card) 43' to 53'	Report	Cards: Dhia Ben Dhiab (yellow card) 52' to 62'; Issam Werhani (yellow card) 54' to 64'	Attendance: 7,000; Referee: Julien Castaignède (France)

18 August 2018	Tunisia	36-13	Morocco	Stade Mustapha Ben Jannet, Monastir
17:00	Try: Achref Ben Hamouda 1', 74'; Sabri Gmir 31'; Haythem Chelli 40+3'; Chadi Jabri 44'; Penalty try 48'; Con: Chamseddine Khalifa (1/4) 40+4'; Mohamed Ali Gafsi 72'; Cards: Haythem Chelli (yellow card) 22' to 32'; Mohsen Essid (yellow card) 38' to 48'	Report	Try: Bechir Deblaoui 4'; Alexandre Bougja 26'; Pen: Naoufal El Kadri (1/2) 39'; Cards: Mohamed Lahlali (yellow card) 22' to 32'	Attendance: 2,000; Referee: Thomas Charrabas (France)

18 August 2018	Namibia	53-28	Kenya	Hage Geingob Rugby Stadium, Windhoek
16:00	Try: Chrysander Botha 22', 70'; Louis van der Westhuizen 24', 41'; Cliven Loubser 33'; Mahepisa Tjeriko 56'; Penalty try 61'; Con: Cliven Loubser (5/6) 24', 27', 42', 58', 71'; Pen: Cliven Loubser 4', 51'	Report	Try: Willy Ambaka 12', 54'; Malcom Onsando 65'; Mohamed Omollo 73'; Con: Isaac Adimo 14'; Darwin Mukidza 55', 66', 73'; Cards: Willy Ambaka (yellow card) 61' to 71'	Attendance: 5,000; Referee: Egon Seconds (South Africa)

18 August 2018	Uganda	18-38	Zimbabwe	Kyadondo Rugby Club, Kampala
15:00	Try: Byron Oketayot 27'; Micheal Okorach 50'; Con: Philip Wokorach (1/2) 28'; Pen: Philip Wokorach (2/3) 33', 62'; Cards: Robert Aziku (yellow card) 4' to 14'; Aaron Ofoyrworth (yellow card) 24' to 34'	Report	Try: Connor Pritchard 5'; Tafadzwa Chitokwindo 25'; Brendon Mandivenga 38'; Tafadzwa Mhende 43'; Shingirai Katsvere 65'; Shayne Makombe 78'; Con: Lenience Tambwera (4/6) 7', 25', 66', 78'	Attendance: 3,000; Referee: Cwengile Jadezweni (South Africa)

== Silver Cup ==
2018 Rugby Africa Silver Cup
- Countries: Algeria; Botswana; Ivory Coast; Madagascar; Senegal; Zambia
- Date: 8 July - 25 August 2018

Unlike the 2017 edition, the 2018 Silver Cup will be split into two groups of 3 teams each. By beating Zambia 31-0, Algeria won the competition and will automatically join the Gold Cup alongside Zambia.

=== Group North ===
Standings

2018 Rugby Africa Gold Cup
Pos	Team	Pl	W	D	L	PF	PA	PD	BP	Pts
1	Algeria	2	2	0	0	45	31	+14	2	10
2	Ivory Coast	2	1	0	1	38	44	-6	0	4
3	Senegal	2	0	0	2	39	47	-8	2	2
* Legend: Pos = Position, Pl = Played, W = Won, D = Drawn, L = Lost, PF = Points for, PA = Points against, PD = Points difference, Pts = Log points.

Matches

8 July 2018	Algeria	22-18	Senegal	Stade Alain Coulon, Toulouse
16:00 CEST (UTC+2)	Try: Enzo Kralfa 27'; Mohamed Belguidoum 33'; Penalty Try 73'; Con: Enzo Kralfa (1/2) 35'; Pen: Enzo Kralfa (1/1) 20'; Cards: Jonathan Franquine (yellow card) 14' to 24'	report	Pen: Aldric Folliot (5/8) 4', 15', 24', 40+1', 49'; Drop: Maxime Boyer (1/1) 60'	Attendance: 300; Referee: Laurent Cardona (France)

11 July 2018	Ivory Coast	25-21	Senegal	Stade Alain Coulon, Toulouse

14 July 2018	Algeria	23-13	Ivory Coast	Stade Alain Coulon, Toulouse
15:00 CEST (UTC+2)	Try: Walid Batchali 58'; Djamel Ouchene 79'; Con: Yoan Saby (1/1) 60'; Enzo Kralfa (1/1) 79'; Pen: Yoan Saby (3/3) 24', 39', 50'	report	Try: Florian N'Gbala 44'; Con: Jonathan Kévin Lo (1/1) 45'; Pen: Jonathan Kévin Lo (2/4) 30', 35'	Attendance: 300; Referee: Pierre Brousset (France)

=== Group South ===
Standings

2018 Rugby Africa Gold Cup
Pos	Team	Pl	W	D	L	PF	PA	PD	BP	Pts
1	Zambia	2	2	0	0	63	42	+21	1	9
2	Madagascar	2	1	0	1	93	49	+44	2	6
3	Botswana	2	0	0	2	31	96	-65	0	0
* Legend: Pos = Position, Pl = Played, W = Won, D = Drawn, L = Lost, PF = Points for, PA = Points against, PD = Points difference, Pts = Log points.

Matches

8 July 2018	Zambia	32-13	Botswana	Leopards Cage stadium, Mufulira
15:30 (UTC+2)	Try: Laston Mukosa 1'; Martin Chisanga 5'; Fernard Kashimoto 12'; Jubilee Chisenga 75'; Oscar Bwalya 76'; Con: David Chisanga 13'; Laston Mukosa 77'; Pen: Dean Zulu 40'; Cards: Fernard Kashimoto (yellow card) 42' to 52'; Berthlock Sikaona (yellow card) 48' to 58'	Report	Try: Kao Chibana 63'; Con: Kaelo Mogotsi 63'; Pen: Kaelo Mogotsi 16', 48'	Attendance: 1,000; Referee: Talent Gandiwa

11 July 2018	Botswana	18-64	Madagascar	Leopards Cage stadium, Mufulira
15:30 (UTC+2)

14 July 2018	Madagascar	29-31	Zambia	Leopards Cage stadium, Mufulira
15:30 (UTC+2)

=== Final ===
20 October 2018	Zambia	0-31	Algeria	Leopards Cage stadium, Mufulira

== Bronze Cup ==
2018 Rugby Africa Bronze Cup
- Countries: Ghana; Lesotho; Mauritius; Rwanda
- Date: 9–12 May 2018
- Champions: Ghana (1st title)
- Runners-up: Mauritius

The 2018 Bronze Cup was contested as a single elimination bracket with 4 teams.

=== Bracket ===
Semi-finals
9 May 2018 - 13:00
Ghana	57
Rwanda	0
9 May 2018 - 15:00
Mauritius	49
Lesotho	16

Final
12 May 2018 - 15:00
Ghana	23
Mauritius	17
Third place play-off
12 May 2018 - 13:00
Rwanda	32
Lesotho	22

=== Matches ===
Semi-finals

9 May 2018	Ghana	57-0	Rwanda	Nduom Sports Stadium, Elmina
13:00	Try: Emmanuel Kalos 6', 10'; Yussif Jalilu Abdul 30'; Michael Acquaye 34', 49', 58'; Hamza Suleiman Mohammed 54'; Yaka Lukman 75'; Con: Alexander G.A. Akoto 7', 31', 34', 50', 55'; Kofi A. Anokye Appiah 59', 76'; Pen: Alexander G.A. Akoto 14'; Cards: Yussif Jalilu Abdul (yellow card) 56' to 66'; Adamson C. Percy (yellow card) 61' to 71'	Report	Cards: Sharif Gasore (yellow card) 47' to 57'	Referee: Saudah Adiru

9 May 2018	Mauritius	49-16	Lesotho	Nduom Sports Stadium, Elmina
15:00	Try: David Maringo 7', 46'; Yannic Bax 68'; Ludovic Leclair 69', 72'; Olivier Baissac 74'; Con: Jean-Philippe Nontocchio 47', 69', 72', 74'; Pen: Jean-Philippe Nontocchio 23', 34', 75'; Cards: Olivier Baissac (yellow card) 49' to 59'	Report	Try: Bokana Ncheke 28'; Con: Bonki Mochesane 28'; Pen: Bonki Mochesane 2', 5', 50'	Referee: Victor Oduor

3rd Place Match

12 May 2018	Rwanda	32-22	Lesotho	Nduom Sports Stadium, Elmina
13:00	Try: Sharif Gasore 9'; Gerard Niyoneza 29'; Charles Kayiranga 32', 76'; Jean Dedieu Hakizimana 40'; Con: Charles Kayiranga 10'; Emmanuel Nduwayezu 33'; Pen: Charles Kayiranga 72'	Report	Try: Sekola Rhetabile 47'; Tlani Nkuka 68'; Paul Mane 80+3'; Con: Bougi Mochesane 48', 80+4'; Pen: Bougi Mochesane 64'	Referee: Victor Oduor

Final

12 May 2018	Ghana	23-17	Mauritius	Nduom Sports Stadium, Elmina
15:00	Try: Michael Acqueye 38'; Selom Gavor 49', 62'; Con: Kofi Appiah 50'; Pen: Kofi Appiah 19', 58'; Cards: Alexander G.A. Akoto (yellow card) 14' to 24'; Prince Boamah (yellow card) 61' to 71'	Report	Try: Olivier Braissac 32'; David Marengo 70'; Francois Martin 74'; Con: Christophe Rousset 71'; Cards: Balagen Videlingen (yellow card) 15' to 25'	Referee: Victor Oduor
