= 2018 Rugby World Cup Sevens squads – Men =

The rosters of all participating teams at the men's tournament of the 2018 Rugby World Cup Sevens.

== Argentina ==
Head coach: Santiago Gómez Cora

No.	Pos.	Player	Date of birth (age)	Union / Club
1	BK	Máximo Provenzano	May 4, 1990 (aged 28)	Alumni
2	BK	Germán Schulz	February 5, 1994 (aged 24)	Tala
3	FW	Conrado Roura	February 28, 1996 (aged 22)	Palermo Bajo
4	FW	Marcos Moroni	July 10, 1995 (aged 23)	CUBA
5	FW	Santiago Mare	October 21, 1996 (aged 21)	Regatas
6	FW	Santiago Álvarez	February 17, 1994 (aged 24)	CASI
7	BK	Lautaro Bazán	February 24, 1996 (aged 22)	Córdoba Athletic
8	BK	Gastón Revol (c)	November 26, 1986 (aged 31)	La Tablada
9	FW	Matías Osadczuk	April 22, 1997 (aged 21)	SITAS
10	BK	Mateo Carreras	December 17, 1999 (aged 18)	Los Tarcos
11	BK	Luciano González	April 10, 1997 (aged 21)	La Tablada
12	BK	Franco Sábato	January 13, 1990 (aged 28)	Alumni

== Australia ==
Head coach: Tim Walsh

No.	Pos.	Player	Date of birth (age)	Union / Club
1	BK	Henry Hutchison	February 12, 1997 (aged 21)	Randwick
2	BK	Liam McNamara	February 9, 1997 (aged 21)	Sunnybank
3	FW	Sam Myers	May 25, 1990 (aged 28)	Norths
4	BK	Lewis Holland (c)	January 14, 1993 (aged 25)	Queanbeyan
5	BK	Ben O'Donnell	August 14, 1995 (aged 22)	Randwick
6	BK	John Porch	March 4, 1994 (aged 24)	Norths
7	BK	Brandon Quinn	January 28, 1994 (aged 24)	Gordon
8	FW	Jesse Parahi	July 29, 1989 (aged 28)	Norths
9	FW	Boyd Killingworth	April 6, 1992 (aged 26)	Warringah
10	BK	Tom Lucas	November 23, 1993 (aged 24)	Sunnybank
11	BK	Maurice Longbottom	January 20, 1995 (aged 23)	LMRDT
12	FW	Lachlan Anderson	August 27, 1997 (aged 20)	Eastwood
13	FW	Tim Anstee	May 19, 1997 (aged 21)	Eastwood

== Canada ==
Head Coach: Damian McGrath

No.	Pos.	Player	Date of birth (age)	Union / Club
1	FW	Matt Mullins	July 28, 1994 (aged 23)	Queen's University
2	BKm	Admir Cejvanovic	June 26, 1990 (aged 28)	Burnaby Lake
3	FW	Luke Bradley	May 10, 1996 (aged 22)	Port Alberni
4	FW	Andrew Coe	April 8, 1996 (aged 22)	Markham Irish
5	BK	Luke McCloskey	July 18, 1992 (aged 26)	Castaway Wanderers
6	BK	Connor Braid	May 31, 1990 (aged 28)	James Bay
7	BK	Lucas Hammond	November 14, 1993 (aged 24)	Toronto Nomads
8	BK	Justin Douglas	April 5, 1994 (aged 24)	Abbotsford
9	BK	Nathan Hirayama	March 23, 1988 (aged 30)	Unattached
10	BK	Pat Kay	September 19, 1993 (aged 24)	Cowichan
11	FW	Harry Jones (c)	August 26, 1989 (aged 28)	Capilano
12	FW	Isaac Kaay	August 30, 1993 (aged 24)	Victoria Vikes

== Chile ==
Head coach: Edmundo Olfos

No.	Pos.	Player	Date of birth (age)	Union / Club
1		Felipe Brangier (c)	November 5, 1988 (aged 29)	Prince of Wales Country Club
2		Pedro Verschae	May 20, 1992 (aged 26)	Viña RC
3		Martín Verschae	May 20, 1992 (aged 26)	Viña RC
4		Marcelo Torrealba	May 6, 1996 (aged 22)	Old Boys
5		Rodrigo Fernández	February 8, 1996 (aged 22)	COBS
6		Lucas Westcott	October 16, 1995 (aged 22)	Old Boys
7		Ignacio Silva	February 16, 1989 (aged 29)	Prince of Wales Country Club
8		Martín Vallejos	October 4, 1994 (aged 23)	Old Reds
9		Francisco Metuaze	December 19, 1988 (aged 29)	Prince of Wales Country Club
10		Francisco Urroz	September 7, 1993 (aged 24)	Old Reds
11		Juan Pablo Larenas	June 1, 1992 (aged 26)	Universidad Católica
12		Benjamín De Vidts	April 11, 1995 (aged 23)	Old Boys

== England ==
Head coach: Simon Amor

No.	Pos.	Player	Date of birth (age)	Union / Club
1	FW	Richard de Carpentier	April 30, 1990 (aged 28)	Unattached
2	FW	Mike Ellery	September 8, 1991 (aged 26)	Saracens
3	FW	Phil Burgess	July 1, 1988 (aged 30)	Unattached
4	BK	Dan Norton	March 22, 1988 (aged 30)	Unattached
5	FW	James Rodwell	August 23, 1984 (aged 33)	Unattached
6	BK	Tom Mitchell (c)	July 22, 1989 (aged 28)	Unattached
7	BK	William Edwards	November 17, 1995 (aged 22)	Unattached
8	BK	Alex Davis	August 3, 1992 (aged 25)	Unattached
9	BK	Ollie Lindsay-Hague	October 8, 1990 (aged 27)	Unattached
10	BK	Ruaridh McConnochie	October 23, 1991 (aged 26)	Bath
11	FW	Will Muir	October 30, 1995 (aged 22)	Unattached
12	BK	Harry Glover	December 31, 1995 (aged 22)	Newcastle University

== Fiji ==
Head coach: Gareth Baber

No.	Pos.	Player	Date of birth (age)	Union / Club
1	FW	Leone Nakarawa	April 2, 1988 (aged 30)	Racing 92
2	BK	Sevuloni Mocenacagi	June 29, 1990 (aged 28)	Suva
3	BK	Kalioni Nasoko	December 2, 1990 (aged 27)	Yasawa
4	FW	Paula Dranisinikula	November 23, 1989 (aged 28)	Army
5	FW	Semi Kunatani	October 27, 1990 (aged 27)	Toulouse
6	FW	Jasa Veremalua	May 13, 1996 (aged 22)	Nadronga
7	BK	Josua Tuisova	February 4, 1994 (aged 24)	Toulon
8	BK	Vatemo Ravouvou	July 31, 1990 (aged 27)	Rewa
9	BK	Jerry Tuwai (c)	March 23, 1989 (aged 29)	Newtown
10	BK	Alosio Naduva	June 25, 1990 (aged 28)	Army
11	FW	Semi Radradra	June 13, 1992 (aged 26)	Toulon
12	BK	Amenoni Nasilasila	February 8, 1992 (aged 26)	Ratu Filise

== France ==
Head coach: Jérôme Daret

No.	Pos.	Player	Date of birth (age)	Union / Club
1	FW	Pierre Boudehent	February 6, 1998 (aged 20)	La Rochelle
2	FW	Manoël Dall'igna (c)	March 12, 1985 (aged 33)	Unattached
3	FW	Tavite Veredamu	September 1, 1989 (aged 28)	RC Nîmes
4	BK	Terry Bouhraoua	August 29, 1987 (aged 30)	Stade Français
5	BK	Stephen Parez	August 1, 1994 (aged 23)	Unattached
6	BK	Paulin Riva	April 20, 1994 (aged 24)	Unattached
7	BK	Kevin Bly	February 28, 1996 (aged 22)	Vannes
8	FW	Pierre-Gilles Lakafia	March 12, 1987 (aged 31)	Unattached
9	BK	Paul Bonnefond	September 13, 1988 (aged 29)	Unattached
10	BK	Jean-Pascal Barraque	April 24, 1991 (aged 27)	Bordeaux
11	FW	Sacha Valleau	October 8, 1996 (aged 21)	Unattached
12	BK	Gabin Villière	September 1, 1989 (aged 28)	Rouen
13	BK	Thibaud Mazzoleni	November 25, 1996 (aged 21)	

== Hong Kong ==
Head coach: Paul John

No.	Pos.	Player	Date of birth (age)	Union / Club
1	FW	Toby Fenn	August 24, 1987 (aged 30)	Valley
2	FW	Michael Coverdale	March 10, 1995 (aged 23)	Hong Kong FC
3		Liam Herbert	September 6, 1998 (aged 19)	Hong Kong FC
4		Lee Jones	June 29, 1985 (aged 33)	Valley
5		Allesandro Nardoni	October 3, 1996 (aged 21)	Hong Kong Scottish
6		Hugo Stiles	August 17, 1996 (aged 21)	Valley
7	BK	Cado Lee	December 27, 1991 (aged 26)	USRC Tigers
8	BK	Max Denmark	August 11, 1999 (aged 18)	Hong Kong FC
9	BK	Jamie Hood	November 13, 1986 (aged 31)	Hong Kong FC
10		Eric Kwok	May 7, 1995 (aged 23)	USRC Tigers
11	BK	Ben Rimene (c)	August 9, 1984 (aged 33)	Valley
12	BK	Salom Yiu	February 4, 1988 (aged 30)	USRC Tigers

== Ireland ==
Head coach: Stan McDowell

No.	Pos.	Player	Date of birth (age)	Union / Club
1	FW	Harry McNulty	March 5, 1993 (aged 25)	UCD
2	FW	Ian Fitzpatrick	August 25, 1994 (aged 23)	Lansdowne
3	FW	John O'Donnell	June 24, 1993 (aged 25)	Lansdowne
4	FW	Shane Daly	December 19, 1996 (aged 21)	Cork Constitution
5	FW	Foster Horan	November 3, 1992 (aged 25)	Lansdowne
6	BK	Billy Dardis (c)	January 31, 1995 (aged 23)	UCD
7	BK	Jordan Conroy	March 10, 1994 (aged 24)	Buccaneers
8	BK	Hugo Keenan	June 10, 1996 (aged 22)	UCD
9	BK	Jimmy O'Brien	November 27, 1996 (aged 21)	UCD
10	BK	Terry Kennedy	July 4, 1996 (aged 22)	St. Mary's College
11	BK	Greg O'Shea	March 23, 1995 (aged 23)	Shannon
12	BK	Bryan Mollen	September 25, 1995 (aged 22)	Dublin University
13	BK	Robert Baloucoune	August 19, 1997 (aged 20)	Ballymena

== Jamaica ==
Head coach: Huntley Anderson

No.	Pos.	Player	Date of birth (age)	Union / Club
1		Dyneal Fessal	July 3, 1992 (aged 26)	Apache 7s
2	BK	Ashley Smith	June 18, 1991 (aged 27)	Unattached
3	FW	Tyler Bush	May 13, 1996 (aged 22)	Unattached
4	BK	Marcus Webber	October 29, 1993 (aged 24)	King Prawn 7s
5		Miguel Facey	January 27, 1997 (aged 21)	St. Catherine
6		Oshane Eddie	January 5, 1991 (aged 27)	St. Catherine
7	BK	Conan Osborne (c)	March 19, 1993 (aged 25)	Richmond
8	BK	Mikel Facey	June 30, 2000 (aged 18)	YCA
9	BK	Rhordi Adamson	October 29, 1993 (aged 24)	Richmond
10	FW	Nyle Beckett	July 25, 1990 (aged 27)	Broadstreet
11		Samuel Rees	February 25, 1995 (aged 23)	Hull Ionians
12		Mark Philips	August 5, 1987 (aged 30)	Legacy 7s

== Japan ==
Head coach: Kensuke Iwabuchi

No.	Pos.	Player	Date of birth (age)	Union / Club
1		Josefa Lilidamu	September 5, 1989 (aged 28)	NTT DoCoMo Red Hurricanes
2		Tevita Tupou	September 26, 1991 (aged 26)	Panasonic Wild Knights
3		Jose Seru	February 9, 1991 (aged 27)	Hokkaido Barbarians
4		Joseph Kamana	September 23, 1991 (aged 26)	Mazda Blue Zoomers
5		Kameli Soejima	June 1, 1983 (aged 35)	Coca-Cola Red Sparks
6		Dai Ozawa (c)	May 8, 1989 (aged 29)	Toyota Verblitz
7		Katsuyuki Sakai	September 7, 1988 (aged 29)	Toyota Industries Shuttles
8		Chihito Matsui	November 11, 1994 (aged 23)	Suntory Sungoliath
9		Jone Naikabula	April 12, 1994 (aged 24)	Toshiba Brave Lupus
10		Kosuke Hashino	November 20, 1989 (aged 28)	Canon Eagles
11		Ryota Kano	May 10, 1992 (aged 26)	Meiji Yasuda Holly’s
12		Taichi Yoshizawa	July 18, 1991 (aged 27)	Coca-Cola Red Sparks
13		Taisei Hayashi	June 27, 1992 (aged 26)	Japan Rugby Football Union

== Kenya ==
Head coach: Innocent Simiyu

No.	Pos.	Player	Date of birth (age)	Union / Club
1	BK	Oscar Ayodi (c)	September 21, 1989 (aged 28)	Homeboyz
2	BK	Herman Humwa	November 8, 1995 (aged 22)	Kenya Harlequin
3	BK	Samuel Ng'ethe	May 15, 1995 (aged 23)	Oilers
4	FW	Brian Tanga	September 13, 1995 (aged 22)	Kabras Sugar
5	FW	Dennis Ombachi	December 14, 1994 (aged 23)	Nondescripts
6	FW	Jeffery Oluoch	April 2, 1995 (aged 23)	Homeboyz
7	BK	Eden Agero	September 17, 1990 (aged 27)	Kenya Harlequin
8	FW	Andrew Amonde	December 25, 1983 (aged 34)	KCB
9	FW	Nelson Oyoo	June 26, 1994 (aged 24)	Nakuru
10	BK	Samuel Oliech	December 15, 1993 (aged 24)	Impala Saracens
11	BK	Collins Injera	October 18, 1986 (aged 31)	Mwamba
12	FW	Willy Ambaka	May 14, 1990 (aged 28)	Kenya Harlequin

== New Zealand ==
Head coach: Clark Laidlaw

No.	Pos.	Player	Date of birth (age)	Union / Club
1	FW	Scott Curry (co-c)	May 17, 1988 (aged 30)	Bay of Plenty
2	FW	Tim Mikkelson (co-c)	August 13, 1986 (aged 31)	Waikato
3	FW	Trael Joass	May 14, 1993 (aged 25)	Tasman
4	BK	Joe Ravouvou	March 21, 1991 (aged 27)	Auckland
5	FW	Dylan Collier	April 27, 1991 (aged 27)	Waikato
6	BK	Akuila Rokolisoa	July 26, 1995 (aged 22)	Auckland
7	BK	Salesi Rayasi	September 25, 1996 (aged 21)	Auckland
8	BK	Andrew Knewstubb	September 14, 1995 (aged 22)	Horowhenua-Kapiti
9	BK	Regan Ware	August 7, 1994 (aged 23)	Bay of Plenty
10	BK	Kurt Baker	October 7, 1988 (aged 29)	Manawatu
11	BK	Jona Nareki	December 27, 1997 (aged 20)	Otago
12	BK	Sione Molia	September 5, 1993 (aged 24)	Counties Manukau

== Papua New Guinea ==
Head coach: Douglas Guise

No.	Pos.	Player	Date of birth (age)	Union / Club
1	BK	Samuel Malambes	January 1, 1996 (aged 22)	New Capital District
2	FW	Henry Kalua (co-c)	September 15, 1992 (aged 25)	East New Britain Province
3		Joseph Mocke	January 21, 1995 (aged 23)	Medang Province
4	BK	Wesley Vali	January 14, 1994 (aged 24)	New Capital District
5		Hensley Peter	December 22, 1993 (aged 24)	East New Britain Province
6	BK	Emmanuel Guise (co-c)	August 11, 1993 (aged 24)	New Capital District
7	BK	William Tirang	December 17, 1995 (aged 22)	East New Britain Province
8		Emil Latuminah	May 27, 1996 (aged 22)	New Capital District
9	FW	Patrick Tatut	February 19, 1992 (aged 26)	Manus Province
10	FW	Dean Manale	November 15, 1989 (aged 28)	New Capital District
11	BK	Freddy Rova	January 12, 1996 (aged 22)	New Capital District
12		Daniel Opa	February 23, 1994 (aged 24)	New Capital District

== Russia ==
Head coach: Andrey Sorokin

No.	Pos.	Player	Date of birth (age)	Union / Club
1	BK	Vladimir Ostroushko (c)	September 30, 1986 (aged 31)	RC Kuban
2	FW	Igor Galinovskiy	November 8, 1985 (aged 32)	Krasny Yar
3	BK	Vladislav Sozonov	October 9, 1993 (aged 24)	VVA Saracens
4	FW	Vladislav Lazarenko	October 2, 1989 (aged 28)	RC Kuban
5	BK	Ilya Babaev	January 10, 1989 (aged 29)	VVA Saracens
6	BK	Vitaly Zhivatov	February 16, 1992 (aged 26)	VVA Saracens
7	BK	Sergei Ianiushkin	November 16, 1986 (aged 31)	VVA Saracens
8	BK	Dmitry Sukhin	January 15, 1995 (aged 23)	Krasny Yar
9	BK	Ramil Gaisin	July 26, 1991 (aged 26)	Yenisey-STM
10	FW	Yury Gostyuzhev	August 20, 1987 (aged 30)	RC Kuban
11	FW	Eme Patris Peki	October 19, 1995 (aged 22)	VVA Saracens
12	FW	German Davydov	March 10, 1994 (aged 24)	VVA Saracens

== Samoa ==
Head coach: Gordon Tietjens

No.	Pos.	Player	Date of birth (age)	Union / Club
1	FW	Tofatu Solia	January 21, 1993 (aged 25)	Falealili
2	FW	Alamanda Motuga	September 11, 1994 (aged 23)	Counties Manukau
3	FW	Gordon Langkilde	January 30, 1996 (aged 22)	Apia
4	BK	Belgium Tuatagaloa	September 19, 1989 (aged 28)	Valence-Romans
5	BK	Neria Fomai	February 3, 1992 (aged 26)	Southland
6	BK	Murphy Paulo	May 1, 1991 (aged 27)	Falealili
7	BK	Alatasi Tupou	April 21, 1988 (aged 30)	Apia
8	BK	Tomasi Alosio	January 26, 1992 (aged 26)	Wellington
9	BK	Malu Falaniko	July 18, 1995 (aged 23)	Apia
10	BK	Joe Perez	March 10, 1993 (aged 25)	Apia West
11	BK	Laaloi Leilual	August 13, 1996 (aged 21)	Aliepata
12	FW	David Afamasaga	July 29, 1994 (aged 23)	Auckland Marist

== Scotland ==
Head Coach: John Dalziel

No.	Pos.	Player	Date of birth (age)	Union / Club
1	FW	Scott Riddell (c)	October 5, 1985 (aged 32)	Melrose
2	FW	Nyle Godsmark	April 10, 1992 (aged 26)	Melrose
3	BK	Alec Coombes	November 26, 1995 (aged 22)	London Scottish
4	BK	Robbie Fergusson	August 30, 1993 (aged 24)	Ayr
5	BK	Craig Jackson	December 28, 1991 (aged 26)	Melrose
6	FW	Joe Nayacavou	May 29, 1985 (aged 33)	Hawick
7	FW	Jamie Farndale	February 21, 1994 (aged 24)	Watsonians
8	BK	Harvey Elms	June 1, 1995 (aged 23)	Currie
9	BK	Sam Pecquer	August 25, 1994 (aged 23)	Melrose
10	BK	Gavin Lowe	March 1, 1995 (aged 23)	Marr
11	BK	Max McFarland	July 13, 1993 (aged 25)	Glasgow Warriors
12	FW	Jack Cuthbert	September 3, 1987 (aged 30)	Watsonians

== South Africa ==
Head Coach: Neil Powell

No.	Pos.	Player	Date of birth (age)	Union / Club
1	FW	Ryan Oosthuizen	May 22, 1995 (aged 23)	Unattached
2	FW	Philip Snyman (c)	March 26, 1987 (aged 31)	Unattached
3	FW	Dylan Sage	January 24, 1992 (aged 26)	Unattached
4	FW	Zain Davids	May 4, 1997 (aged 21)	Unattached
5	FW	Werner Kok	January 17, 1993 (aged 25)	Unattached
6	FW	Heino Bezuidenhout	March 13, 1997 (aged 21)	Blue Bulls
7	BK	Dewald Human	May 19, 1995 (aged 23)	Unattached
8	BK	Rosko Specman	April 28, 1989 (aged 29)	Unattached
9	BK	Justin Geduld	October 1, 1993 (aged 24)	Unattached
10	BK	Selvyn Davids	March 26, 1994 (aged 24)	Unattached
11	BK	Siviwe Soyizwapi	December 7, 1992 (aged 25)	Unattached
12	BK	Ruhan Nel	May 17, 1991 (aged 27)	Western Province

== Tonga ==
Head coach: Taholo Anitoni

No.	Pos.	Player	Date of birth (age)	Union / Club
1		Unaloto Kaloni	December 2, 1994 (aged 23)	Haasini
2		Taniela Kilioni	February 22, 1993 (aged 25)	Grenoble
3		Violeti Kolo	June 17, 1996 (aged 22)	Marist
4		Alefosio Vahe	July 15, 1997 (aged 21)	Marist
5		Samiu Muna	April 22, 1990 (aged 28)	Tavatuʻutolu
6	BK	Fetuʻu Vainikolo	January 30, 1985 (aged 33)	Utah Warriors
7		Solomone Pauʻuvale	December 24, 1995 (aged 22)	Tavatuʻutolu
8		Young Pongi	January 18, 1996 (aged 22)	Fuekafa
9	FW	Jack Ram	January 14, 1987 (aged 31)	Coventry
10		Taniela Samita	October 15, 1995 (aged 22)	Marist
11		Semisi Tei	July 16, 1995 (aged 23)	Tavatuʻutolu
12		Sosaia Tokai	July 24, 1996 (aged 21)	Lavengamalie

== Uganda ==
Head coach: Tolbert Onyango

No.	Pos.	Player	Date of birth (age)	Union / Club
1	BK	Byron Oketayot	November 15, 1995 (aged 22)	Rhinos
2	FW	Pius Ogena	October 30, 1994 (aged 23)	Buffaloes
3	FW	James Odongo	August 20, 1989 (aged 28)	Buffaloes
4	BK	Adrian Kasito	October 30, 1995 (aged 22)	Kobs
5	BK	Philip Wokorach	December 31, 1993 (aged 24)	Heathens
6	FW	Michael Okorach (c)	August 14, 1990 (aged 27)	Heathens
7	BK	Justin Kimono	January 10, 1992 (aged 26)	Kobs
8	FW	Desire Ayera	January 9, 1999 (aged 19)	Pirates
9	BK	Aaron Ofoyrwoth	October 7, 1997 (aged 20)	Heathens
10	FW	Solomon Okia	October 14, 1996 (aged 21)	Buffaloes
11	BK	Timothy Kisiga	December 2, 1996 (aged 21)	Pirates
12	BK	Ivan Magomu	September 6, 1993 (aged 24)	Pirates

== United States ==
Head coach: Mike Friday

No.	Pos.	Player	Date of birth (age)	Union / Club
1	BK	Carlin Isles	November 29, 1989 (aged 28)	Unattached
2	FW	Ben Pinkelman	June 13, 1994 (aged 24)	Denver Barbarians
3	FW	Danny Barrett	March 23, 1990 (aged 28)	Unattached
4	FW	Matai Leuta	July 20, 1990 (aged 28)	Unattached
5	FW	Brett Thompson	August 17, 1990 (aged 27)	Unattached
6	BK	Kevon Williams	June 7, 1991 (aged 27)	Denver Barbarians
7	BK	Folau Niua	January 27, 1985 (aged 33)	Unattached
8	BK	Maka Unufe	September 28, 1991 (aged 26)	Unattached
9	FW	Stephen Tomasin	September 25, 1994 (aged 23)	Unattached
10	BK	Madison Hughes (c)	October 26, 1992 (aged 25)	Unattached
11	BK	Perry Baker	June 29, 1986 (aged 32)	Unattached
12	BK	Martin Iosefo	January 13, 1990 (aged 28)	Unattached
	BK	Chris Mattina	March 31, 1993 (aged 25)	New York Athletic Club
	FW	Pat Blair	January 27, 1990 (aged 28)	Unattached

== Uruguay ==
Head coach: Luis Pedro Achard

No.	Pos.	Player	Date of birth (age)	Union / Club
1	BK	Gabriel Puig (c)	February 4, 1990 (aged 28)	Old Boys
2	FW	Manuel Ardao	September 9, 1998 (aged 19)	Old Christians
3	FW	Juan Garese	January 25, 1999 (aged 19)	Carrasco Polo
4	FW	Guillermo Lietjenstein	September 14, 1990 (aged 27)	Trébol
5	BK	Felipe Etcheverry	June 23, 1996 (aged 22)	Carrasco Polo
6	BK	Diego Ardao	August 4, 1995 (aged 22)	Old Christians
7	BK	Nicolás Freitas	July 3, 1993 (aged 25)	Carrasco Polo
8	BK	Gastón Mieres	October 5, 1989 (aged 28)	Lobos
9	BK	Joaquín Alonso	February 18, 1997 (aged 21)	Old Boys
10	FW	Sebastián Schroeder	October 14, 1993 (aged 24)	Trébol
11	BK	Eugenio Plottier	May 25, 1995 (aged 23)	Old Boys
12	FW	Valentín Grille	June 15, 1998 (aged 20)	Old Christians

== Wales ==
Head coach: Gareth Williams

No.	Pos.	Player	Date of birth (age)	Union / Club
1	BK	Luke Treharne	January 18, 1993 (aged 25)	Unattached
2	BK	Ethan Davies	February 28, 1994 (aged 24)	Unattached
3	BK	Lloyd Williams	November 30, 1989 (aged 28)	Cardiff Blues
4	BK	Luke Morgan	May 16, 1992 (aged 26)	Ospreys
5	FW	Owen Jenkins	July 20, 1993 (aged 25)	Unattached
6	BK	Tom Glyn Williams	July 30, 1996 (aged 21)	Ospreys
7	BK	Cory Allen	February 11, 1993 (aged 25)	Ospreys
8	FW	Afon Bagshaw	May 25, 1994 (aged 24)	RGC 1404
9	FW	Adam Thomas (c)	August 22, 1986 (aged 31)	Pontypridd
10	FW	Cai Devine	February 13, 1998 (aged 20)	RGC 1404
11	BK	Jared Rosser	February 21, 1997 (aged 21)	Dragons
12	FW	Ben Roach	January 30, 1994 (aged 24)	Unattached
13	BK	Will Talbot-Davies	September 11, 1997 (aged 20)	Dragons

== Zimbabwe ==
Head coach: Gilbert Nyamutsamba

No.	Pos.	Player	Date of birth (age)	Union / Club
1	BK	Boyd Rouse (c)	October 27, 1993 (aged 24)	Bury St Edmunds
2	FW	Connor Pritchard	September 17, 1996 (aged 21)	Griffith Uni Colleges RC
3		Nelson Madida	May 8, 1989 (aged 29)	Matabeleland Warriors
4		Kudakwashe Chiwanza	May 29, 1991 (aged 27)	Old Georgians
5	BK	Ngoni Chibuwe	October 17, 1994 (aged 23)	Old Georgians
6		Shayne Makombe	November 21, 1991 (aged 26)	Compiègne
7	BK	Tafadzwa Chitokwindo	September 20, 1990 (aged 27)	TV Pforzheim
8	FW	Biselele Tshamala	November 26, 1990 (aged 27)	College Rovers RC
9		Shingirai Hlanguyo	May 11, 1998 (aged 20)	Cal State LA
10		Tarisai Mugariri	June 9, 1994 (aged 24)	Matabeleland Warriors
11	BK	Stephan Hunduza	March 4, 1992 (aged 26)	Diggers
12	BK	Riaan O'Neill	May 24, 1994 (aged 24)	False Bay RFC
