= 2022 Currie Cup First Division =

Domestic rugby union competition

- Countries: South Africa
- Date: 1 April – 24 June
- Champions: Griffons (5th title)
- Runners-up: Eastern Province Elephants
- Promoted: Griffons
- Matches played: 45
- Tries scored: 351 (average 7.8 per match)
- Top point scorer: Jaywinn Juries (Griffons, 169)
- Top try scorer: Jaiden Baron (Boland Cavaliers, 12)

The 2022 Currie Cup First Division was the 84th edition of the Currie Cup. As the second-tier of the competition, it ran alongside the 2022 Currie Cup Premier Division. It was sponsored by beer brand Carling Black Label and organised by the South African Rugby Union.

The tournament was played from April to June in a single round-robin format, following the realignment of the South African domestic rugby union calendar to dovetail with the northern hemisphere and the United Rugby Championship, which features four South African sides.

The competition again featured ten sides, the seven sides who competed in the 2021 Currie Cup First Division, and teams from Georgia, Kenya and Zimbabwe. The top South African side in the 2022 Currie Cup First Division was promoted to the Premier Division for 2023, forming an eight team competition. The 2022 Currie Cup Premier Division began in January and was completed in June.

== Teams ==
Location of teams in the 2022 Currie Cup First Division
(not including the Black Lion, the Simbas or the Zimbabwe Goshawks)

The ten competing teams are:

2022 Currie Cup First Division
Team	Sponsored name
Black Lion	Black Lion
Boland Cavaliers	Boland Kavaliers
Border Bulldogs	Border Bulldogs
Eastern Province Elephants	Eastern Province Elephants
Griffons	Down Touch Griffons
Leopards	Leopards
Simbas	Simbas
SWD Eagles	SWD Eagles
Valke	Valke
Zimbabwe Goshawks	Zimbabwe Goshawks

== Regular season ==
=== Standings ===
2022 Currie Cup First Division standings
Pos	Team	Pld	W	D	L	PF	PA	PD	TF	TA	TB	LB	Pts	Qualification
1	Griffons	9	9	0	0	435	174	+261	51	20	8	0	44	semifinals
2	Eastern Province Elephants	9	6	0	3	305	167	+138	44	23	6	2	32	semifinals
3	SWD Eagles	9	6	0	3	258	207	+51	37	30	5	0	29	semifinals
4	Black Lion	9	6	0	3	255	210	+45	27	13	5	0	29	semifinals
5	Valke	9	5	0	4	281	230	+51	37	26	5	3	28	
6	Boland Cavaliers	9	4	0	5	260	241	+19	36	31	6	4	26	
7	Leopards	9	3	0	6	232	227	+5	39	34	2	4	18	
8	Simbas	9	3	0	6	261	312	−51	38	48	3	3	18	
9	Zimbabwe Goshawks	9	3	0	6	99	278	−179	12	40	0	0	12	
10	Border Bulldogs	9	0	0	9	68	408	−340	9	61	0	0	0	

Source: springboks.rugby
Rules for classification: Tournament points in the standings were awarded to teams as follows:
- 4 points for a win.
- 2 points for a draw.
- 1 bonus point for a loss in a match by seven points or under.
- 1 bonus point for scoring four tries or more.
Teams were ranked in the standings firstly by tournament points then by: (a) points difference from all matches (points scored less points conceded); (b) tries difference from all matches (tries scored less tries conceded); (c) points difference from the matches between the tied teams; (d) points scored in all matches; (e) tries scored in all matches; and, if needed, (f) a coin toss.

=== Round-by-round ===
The table below shows the progression of all teams throughout the Currie Cup season. Each team's tournament points on the standings log is shown for each round, with the overall log position in brackets.

2022 Currie Cup team progression
Team	R1	R2	R3	R4	R5	R6	R7	R8	R9	R10	Semi	Final
Black Lion	5 (1st)	9 (1st)	9 (3rd)	9 (4th)	14 (4th)	19 (4th)	19 (6th)	19 (6th)	24 (4th)	29 (4th)	Lost	DNQ
Boland Cavaliers	2 (6th)	4 (7th)	4 (8th)	9 (6th)	11 (7th)	17 (6th)	21 (5th)	21 (5th)	26 (3rd)	26 (6rd)	DNQ	DNQ
Border Bulldogs	0 (10th)	0 (10th)	0 (10th)	0 (10th)	0 (10th)	0 (10th)	0 (10th)	0 (10th)	0 (10th)	0 (10th)	DNQ	DNQ
Eastern Province Elephants	5 (4th)	6 (4th)	11 (4th)	16 (1st)	21 (3rd)	26 (2nd)	26 (2nd)	26 (2nd)	31 (2nd)	32 (2nd)	Won	Lost
Griffons	5 (2nd)	10 (2nd)	10 (3rd)	15 (3rd)	30 (1st)	35 (1st)	39 (1st)	39 (1st)	44 (1st)	44 (1st)	Won	Won
Leopards	0 (6th)	4 (6th)	5 (6th)	6 (7th)	12 (6th)	12 (8th)	12 (7th)	17 (7th)	18 (7th)	18 (7th)	DNQ	DNQ
Simbas	0 (7th)	0 (8th)	1 (9th)	2 (9th)	7 (9th)	8 (9th)	8 (9th)	8 (9th)	13 (8th)	18 (8th)	DNQ	DNQ
SWD Eagles	0 (8th)	5 (5th)	9 (5th)	9 (5th)	9 (5th)	14 (5th)	19 (3rd)	24 (3rd)	24 (5th)	29 (3rd)	Lost	DNQ
Valke	5 (5th)	10 (3rd)	15 (1st)	15 (3rd)	22 (2nd)	22 (3rd)	22 (4th)	22 (4th)	23 (6th)	28 (5th)	DNQ	DNQ
Zimbabwe Goshawks	0 (9th)	0 (9th)	4 (7th)	4 (8th)	12 (8th)	12 (7th)	12 (8th)	12 (8th)	12 (9th)	12 (9th)	DNQ	DNQ
Key:		Win	Draw	Loss	No match	Bye	Posp.					

=== Matches ===
Listed below are all matches for the round-robin, played for the 2022 Currie Cup First Division.

==== Round 1 ====
1 April 2022	SWD Eagles	15–34	Eastern Province Elephants	Outeniqua Park, George
19:00				Referee: Stephan Geldenhuys

2 April 2022	Boland Cavaliers	26–32	Valke	Piketberg Rugby Club, Piketberg
14:00				Referee: Ruhan Meiring

2 April 2022	Zimbabwe Goshawks	10–34	Black Lion	Villagers, Cape Town
14:00				Referee: Phumzilo Mbewu

2 April 2022	Griffons	106–7	Border Bulldogs	HT Pelatona Projects Stadium, Welkom
15:00				Referee: Christopher Allison

==== Round 2 ====
7 April 2022	Eastern Province Elephants	22–25	Black Lion	Madibaz Stadium, Port Elizabeth
19:00				Referee: Christopher Allison

8 April 2022	SWD Eagles	28–27	Boland Cavaliers	Outeniqua Park, George
19:00				Referee: Phumzilo Mbewu

8 April 2022	Border Bulldogs	9–19	Leopards	Police Park, East London
15:00				Referee: Paul Mente

9 April 2022	Valke	51–14	Simbas	Bosman Stadium, Brakpan
15:00				Referee: Dylen November

9 April 2022	Griffons	48–5	Zimbabwe Goshawks	HT Pelatona Projects Stadium, Welkom
15:00				Referee: Sean Muller

==== Round 3 ====
22 April 2022	SWD Eagles	17–15	Leopards	Outeniqua Park, George
19:00				Referee: Christopher Allison

23 April 2022	Simbas	21–22	Zimbabwe Goshawks	Ceres Rugby Club, Ceres
13:00				Referee: Dylen November

23 April 2022	Valke	59–5	Border Bulldogs	Bosman Stadium, Brakpan
15:00				Referee: Ruhan Meiring

23 April 2022	Boland Cavaliers	13–31	Eastern Province Elephants	Ceres Rugby Club, Ceres
15:00				Referee: Sean Muller

23 April 2022	Black Lion	Cancelled (Note: The match between the Black Lion and Griffons was cancelled. No confirmation has yet been given of the outcome of this fixture.)	Griffons	HT Pelatona Projects Stadium, Welkom
15:00

==== Round 4 ====
30 April 2022	Leopards	33–42	Boland Cavaliers	Olën Park, Potchefstroom
15:00				Referee: Christopher Allison

30 April 2022	Griffons	66–33	Simbas	HT Pelatona Projects Stadium, Welkom
15:00				Referee: Ruhan Meiring

30 April 2022	Valke	Cancelled	Black Lion	Bosman Stadium, Brakpan
15:00

30 April 2022	Eastern Province Elephants	64–7	Border Bulldogs	Madibaz Stadium, Port Elizabeth
15:30				Referee: Sean Muller

==== Round 5 ====
7 May 2022	Zimbabwe Goshawks	23–22	Boland Cavaliers	False Bay Rugby Club, Cape Town
14:30				Referee: Phumzilo Mbewu

7 May 2022	Simbas	35–12	Border Bulldogs	Fort Hare Stadium, Alice
15:00				Referee: Aimee Barrett-Theron

7 May 2022	Leopards	25–15	Valke	Olën Park, Potchefstroom
15:00				Referee: Paul Mente

7 May 2022	Griffons	40–16	SWD Eagles	HT Pelatona Projects Stadium, Welkom
15:00				Referee: Griffin Colby

==== Round 6 ====
14 May 2022	Leopards	31–34	Eastern Province Elephants	Olën Park, Potchefstroom
15:00				Referee: Ruhan Meiring

14 May 2022	Valke	35–38	SWD Eagles	Bosman Stadium, Brakpan
15:00				Referee: Dylen November

14 May 2022	Boland Cavaliers	31–36	Griffons	Rangers Sportsground, Bredasdorp
15:00				Referee: Paul Mente

15 May 2022	Border Bulldogs	8–18	Zimbabwe Goshawks	Sisa Dukashe Stadium, Mdantsane
15:00				Referee: Cwengile Jadezweni

==== Round 7 ====
20 May 2022	SWD Eagles	48–0	Zimbabwe Goshawks	Outeniqua Park, George
16:00				Referee: Phumzilo Mbewu

21 May 2022	Boland Cavaliers	45–33	Simbas	Boland Stadium, Wellington
15:00				Referee: Ruhan Meiring

21 May 2022	Border Bulldogs	5–35	Black Lion	Madibaz Stadium, Port Elizabeth
15:00				Referee: Griffin Colby

22 May 2022	Eastern Province Elephants	45–7	Valke	Madibaz Stadium, Port Elizabeth
15:30				Referee: Stephan Geldenhuys

24 May 2022	Griffons	35–25	Leopards	HT Pelatona Projects Stadium, Welkom
15:00				Referee: Morné Ferreira

==== Round 8 ====
28 May 2022	Zimbabwe Goshawks	0–35	Leopards	City Park Stadium, Athlone
13:00				Referee: Christopher Allison

28 May 2022	Simbas	7–24	SWD Eagles	City Park Stadium, Athlone
15:00				Referee: Griffin Colby

28 May 2022	Eastern Province Elephants	13–23	Griffons	Nelson Mandela Bay Stadium, Port Elizabeth
15:30				Referee: Morné Ferreira

29 May 2022	Black Lion	17–27	Boland Cavaliers	Boland Stadium, Wellington
15:00

==== Round 9 ====
3 June 2022	SWD Eagles	27–42	Black Lion	Outeniqua Park, George
16:00				Referee: Christopher Allison

4 June 2022	Valke	25–33	Griffons	Bosman Stadium, Brakpan
15:00				Referee: Ruhan Meiring

4 June 2022	Simbas	51–35	Leopards	RFUEA Ground, Nairobi
15:00				Referee: Paul Mente

5 June 2022	Border Bulldogs	8–27	Boland Cavaliers	Police Park, East London
15:00

5 June 2022	Eastern Province Elephants	36–5	Zimbabwe Goshawks	Nelson Mandela Bay Stadium, Port Elizabeth
15:30				Referee: Sean Muller

==== Round 10 ====
11 June 2022	Zimbabwe Goshawks	16–26	Valke	Wynberg Boys' High School, Cape Town
14:30				Referee: Paul Mente

11 June 2022	Black Lion	24–14	Leopards	Olën Park, Potchefstroom
15:00				Referee: Phumzilo Mbewu

11 June 2022	Border Bulldogs	7–45	SWD Eagles	Police Park, East London
15:00				Referee: Griffin Colby

11 June 2022	Simbas	41–24	Eastern Province Elephants	RFUEA Ground, Nairobi
15:00				Referee: Stephan Geldenhuys

== Play-offs ==
=== Semifinals ===
17 June 2022	Griffons	41–38 (a.e.t.)	Black Lion	HT Pelatona Projects Stadium, Welkom
15:00				Referee: Ruhan Meiring

18 June 2022	Eastern Province Elephants	26–12	SWD Eagles	Wolfson Stadium, KwaZakele
14:00				Referee: Christopher Allison

=== Final ===
24 June 2022	Griffons	45–16	Eastern Province Elephants	HT Pelatona Projects Stadium, Welkom
14:00	Try: Smit 9' c Xakalashe 30' c Wehr (2) 34' m, 78' c September 71' c Con: Juries (3/4) 10', 31', 72'; Pretoruis (1/1) 79'; Pen: Juries (4/6) 16', 22', 38', 43'; Cards: Matthys (yellow card) 64' to 74'	Report	Try: Damons 25' m Payi 46' m Pen: Mattheus (2/2) 6', 18'; Cards: Du Plessis (yellow card) 29' to 40'	Referee: Stephan Geldenhuys

== Players ==
=== Team rosters ===
The respective team squads for the 2022 Currie Cup First Division are:

Black Lion squad
Forwards
- Nika Abuladze
- Tornike Akubardia
- Nikoloz Aptsiauri
- Mikheil Babunashvili
- Ioseb Gusharashvili
- Luka Ivanishvili
- Lasha Jaiani
- Goga Kadaria
- Nika Khatiashvili
- Sandro Koiava
- Giorgi Maisuradze
- Sandro Mamamtavrishvili
- Shalva Mamukashvili
- Mikheil Oragvelidze
- Nika Pataraia
- Giorgi Pertaia
- Levan Tchavtchavadze
- Nodar Tcheishvili
- Giorgi Tkhilaishvili
- Mikheil Tsiklauri
- Tengiz Zamtaradze
Backs
- Shalva Aptsiauri
- Giorgi Babunashvili
- Giorgi Begadze
- Giorgi Chikovani
- Gurami Kandaurashvili
- Lasha Khmaladze
- Davit Khuroshvili
- Otar Lashkhi
- Lasha Lomidze
- Luka Matkava
- Mirian Modebadze
- Davit Modzgvrishvili
- Tengiz Peranidze
- Merab Sharikadze
- Sandro Svanidze
- Aka Tabutsadze
- Demur Tapladze
- Teimuraz Tchitchinadze
- Alexander Todua
Coach
- Levan Maisashvili

Boland Cavaliers squad
Forwards
- Sauliegh Arendse
- Hilroy Baadjies
- Gerrit Bester
- Emile Booysen
- Emile Booysen
- Nicholas Duhwa
- Jacobus du Plessis
- Kevin Fikster
- Brendon Fortuin
- Wayrin Losper
- Thurlow Marsh
- Ayyoob Moerat
- Charles Nimb
- Schalk Oelofse
- Keenan Opperman
- Ryan Persence
- Chadwin Robertson
- Peter Smit
- JJ Strydom
- Ian Thompson
- Carl Truter
- Jordan Williams
- Marlyn Williams
- Wayne Wilschut
Backs
- Jaiden Baron
- Alshaun Bock
- Denzil Douries
- Cornell Engelbrecht
- Marvin Fredericks
- Cameron Hufke
- Jacquin Jansen
- Jurick Lewis
- Dylan Maart
- Ryno Marais
- Theodore Marinus
- Laznar Nxele
- Dylon Siegelaar
- Gavern Skippers
- Percival Williams
- Warren Williams
Coach
- Franzel September

Border Bulldogs squad
Forwards
- Sithhembiso Adonisi
- Chuma Biyani
- Hugo Bronkhorst
- Mkhonto Caku-Caku
- Ntsika Daka
- Onke Dubase
- Cole Haggard
- Phila Layiti
- Azola Manti
- Asekho Marubelela
- Vuyisani Mavuso
- Siba Mnkani
- Sokhana Mpemba
- Yamkela Mzozoyana
- Likho Ndiyalwa
- Miyelane Ngobeni
- Ayabonga Nomboyo
- Edwin Nxumalo
- Sinesipho Puzi
- Kuhle Seteni
- Lukhanyo Siyobi
- Esethu Zenani
Backs
- Lutho Adonis
- Migcobo Bovu
- Keith Chiwara
- Sakhe Dingile
- Ntabeni Dukisa
- Lelethu Gcilitshane
- Vusi Hanabe
- Lwazi Madiba
- Lwandile Mapuko
- Soso Matyoyi
- Edwin Mcaphukana
- Mihlali Nchukana
- Mihlali Nobomvu
- Sipho Nofemele
- Edwin Nxumalo
- Yakha Qinela
- Sicelo Tole
- Simamnkele Yafele
- Anele Zweni
Coach
- Lumumba Currie

Eastern Province Elephants squad
Forwards
- Zingisa April
- Mzwanele Besman
- Duncan Du Buisson
- Duan du Plessis
- Billy Dutton
- Cebo Gidane
- Laken Gray
- Gerrit Huisamen
- Hannes Huisamen
- Athenkosi Khethani
- Arnold Kleyn
- Luxolo Koza
- Sibusiso Lali
- Rob Lyons
- Sive Mazosiwe
- Lungi Mbiko
- Siya Nzuzo
- Robin Stevens
- Roche van Zyl
- Tiaan Vermaak
- Jaco Willemse
- Stefan Willemse
- Diego Williams
- Vian Wolmarans
Backs
- Riaan Arendse
- Masixole Banda
- Luvo Claasen
- Rodney Damons
- Chucky Ismail
- Garrick Mattheus
- Athi Mayinje
- Dayle Nel
- Rouche Nel
- Qeutyne Oerson
- Aya Oliphant
- Mbembe Payi
- Merlynn Pieterse
- Davian Swanepoel
- Sacha Toring
- Josiah Twum-Boafo
Coach
- Dumisani Mhani

Griffons squad
Forwards
- Michael Benadie
- Stephan de Jager
- Dandrè Delport
- Xolani Jacobs
- Etienne Janeke
- Hannes Janse van Rensburg
- Athenkosi Khethani
- Jared Kruger
- Thato Mavundla
- Kyle Milford
- Neo Mohapi
- Oupa Mohojé
- Nqoba Mxoli
- Wikus Nieuwenhuis
- Buhle Nojekwa
- Zander Oberholzer
- Jean-Jacques Pretorius
- Simon Raw
- Curtley Thomas
- Keith van Aswegen
- Janus Venter
- Chadley Wenn
- Ludio Williams
- Soso Xakalashe
Backs
- Lionel April
- Lloyd April
- Carel-Jan Coetzee
- Donovan Don
- Jaywinn Juries
- Granwill Matthys
- Allistair Mumba
- Duann Pretoruis
- Marquit September
- Dommenic Smit
- Aphiwe Stemele
- Duncan van Vuuren
- Keanu Vers
- Gurshwin Wehr
- Ethan Williams
Coach
- Jacques Juries

Leopards squad
Forwards
- Heinz Bertram
- Waldo Crous
- Jandre de Beer
- Ruben Dreyer
- Ruben du Plessis
- Gustav Erlank
- Lukas Klopper
- Robert Kruger
- Robey Leibbrandt
- Lihle Lolwane
- Lion Lushozi
- JP Mans
- Franco Marais
- Vincent Maruping
- Marvelous Mashimbye
- Wihan Nel
- Siya Mdaka
- Masonwabe Ngcem
- Freddy Ngoza
- Lwando Nteta
- Faf Pelser
- Arminn Posthumus
- Johann Scheepers
- Didi Sekati
- HP Swart
- Sampie Swiegers
- Joe van der Hoogt
- Tiaan van der Merwe
- Marco van Deventer
- Chris Vermaak
- Cohen Wortley
Backs
- Gerhard Ackerman
- Tjaart Benade
- Heinrich Botha
- Shirwin Cupido
- Willem du Plessis
- Quan Eymann
- Riaan Genis
- Andre Grobler
- Eugene Hare
- Sylvester Hassien
- Duren Hoffman
- Naiden Jaarts
- Meyer Kriel
- Aphelele Madaka
- Vuyo Mbotho
- Isrome Phatudi
- Andries Truter
- Keenan Twigg
- Pienaar van Niekerk
- Martin Venter
- Danrich Visagie
- Keano Windvogel
Coach
- André Pretorius

Simbas squad
Forwards
- Oscar Ouma Achieng
- Teddy Akala
- Shem Angugo
- Manasseh Auma
- Davis Chenge
- Toby Francombe
- Brian Juma
- Clinton Juma
- Ian Karanja
- Oliver Kizito
- Brian Masinza
- Elkeans Mukamiti
- Bethwel Muteshi
- Mark Mutuku
- Brian Ndirangu
- Edwin Njuguna
- Joseph Nyagol
- George Nyambua
- Kevin Nyongesa
- Epraim Oduor
- Felix Ojow
- Martin Omondi
- Thomas Ongera
- Malcolm Onsando
- Patrick Ouko
- Chrispine Shitundo
- Eugene Sifuna
- Daniel Sikuta
- Emmanuel Silungi
- Andrew Siminyu
- Brian Waraba
- Colman Were
Backs
- Bryceson Adaka
- Willy Ambaka
- Samuel Asati
- Derrick Ashihundu
- Owain Ashley
- Dominic Coilson
- Timothy Ejakait
- Collins Emonyi
- Isaac Ikigu
- Peter Kilonzo
- Michael Kimwele
- Darwin Kinyangi
- Brian Maragwa
- Andrew Matoka
- Anthony Mboya
- Jeff Mutukugi
- Beldad Ogeta
- Jacob Ojee
- Maxwell Oketch
- John Okeyo
- Geoffrey Ominde
- Vincent Owino
- Brian Tanga
- Jone Tavaga
- Michael Walyaula
Coach
- Paul Odera

SWD Eagles squad
Forwards
- Freggie Africa
- Ian Alexander
- Marnus Botha
- Phillipus Botha
- Alwyn Carstens
- Mitch Carstens
- Layle Delo
- Armand Grobler
- Stefaan Grundlingh
- Keano Hendricks
- Stephen Leonard
- Khanya Ncusane
- Lucky Ngcamu
- Nkosi Nofuma
- Arie O'Neil
- Shaun Raubenheimer
- Heinrich Roelfse
- Raaez Salie
- Anton Smit
- Duimpie Swartz
- Justin Theys
- PJ Toerien
- Gihard Visagie
- Armando Wienand
Backs
- Ezrick Alexander
- Deon Carstens
- JP Duvenage
- Darryn Fortuin
- Lungelo Gosa
- Kirsten Heyns
- Jaylen James
- Adri Jacobs
- Winslin Klaasen
- André Manuel
- Hlumelo Ndudula
- Austin Prins
- Edwin Sass
- Keagen September
- Dillin Snel
- Rosco Syster
- Regan van der Westhuizen
- Gene Willemse
Coach
- Anton Moolman

Valke squad
Forwards
- Cody Basson
- Reuben du Plooy
- Eddie Evans
- Njabulo Gumede
- Ethan Jeffery
- Khwezi Mafu
- Spiec Magawu
- Stairs Mhlongo
- Komape Moloto
- Raynardt Nel
- Thabo Ntunja
- Darnell Osuagwu
- Dwayne Pienaar
- Hugo Pienaar
- Pierre Rabie
- Bulelani Sali
- Bheki Shongwe
- Zander van der Merwe
- Jordan van Dyk
- Boela Venter
- Andrew Volschenk
Backs
- Chris Booysen
- Coert Cronjé
- Luciano Elias
- Keagan Fortune
- Ruben Liebenberg
- Jimmy Mpailane
- Franco Pienaar
- Johan Pretorius
- Lundi Ralarala
- Godfrey Ramaboea
- Sherwin Slater
- Joshua Vermeulen
- Ruan Wasserman
- Valentino Wellman
- Iusanda Xakwana
Coach
- JP Immelman

Zimbabwe Goshawks squad
Forwards
- Dustin Andrews
- Sean Beevor
- Aiden Burnett
- Tonderai Chiwambutsa
- Johan du Preez
- Andrew Evans
- Tyran Fagan
- Bornwell Gwinji
- Aaron Juma
- Doug Juszczyk
- Kelvin Kanenungo
- Cleopas Kundiona
- Liam Larkan
- David Makamba
- Deanne Makoni
- Matthew Mandioma
- Godwin Mangenje
- Mungo Mason
- Brian Muntanga
- Victor Mupunga
- Godfrey Muzanargwo
- Kudakwashe Nyakufaringwa
- Declan Ralphs
- Sebastian Roche
- Panashe Rukodzi
- George Saungweme
- Gabriel Sipapate
- Nyasha Tarusenga
- Biselele Tshamala
- Dylan Utete
Backs
- Tavonga Ablant
- Daniel Capsopoulos
- Munashe Chaitezwi
- Taku Chieza
- Keith Chiwara
- Brendon Curle
- Russell Dinha
- Kyle Galloway
- Shingirai Katsvere
- Conor Kennedy
- Shayne Makombe
- Darrel Makwasha
- Brendon Marume
- Carlos Matematema
- Tawanda Matipano
- Matthew McNab
- Hilton Mudariki
- Brandon Mudzekenyedzi
- Ernest Mudzengerere
- Taku Musingwini
- Ronald Ndidura
- Marcus Nel
- Riaan O'Neill
- Boyd Rouse
Coach
- Brendon Dawson

== Referees ==
The following referees officiated matches in the competition:

2021 Currie Cup First Division referees
- Christopher W. Allison
- Aimee Barrett-Theron
- Griffin Colby
- Stephan Geldenhuys
- Cwengile Jadezweni
- Phumzilo Mbewu
- Ruhan Meiring
- Paul Mente
- Sean Muller
- Dylen November

== See also ==
- 2022 Currie Cup Premier Division
