= Kenya national rugby union team =

Kenya
- Nickname: Simbas
- Emblem: African lion
- Union: Kenya Rugby Union
- Director of Rugby: Thomas Odundo
- Head coach: Jerome Paarwater
- Captain: Daniel Sikuta
- Most caps: Joel Nganga (52)
- Top scorer: Darwin Mukidza (385)
- Top try scorer: Darwin Mukidza (18)
- Home stadium: RFUEA Ground
| First colours | Second colours |

World Rugby ranking
- Current: 36 (as of 19 June 2026)
- Highest: 22 (2016)
- Lowest: 51 (2003, 2004)

First international
- Kenya Kenya won Tanganyika (Note: The first match for both Kenya and Tanzania (Tanganyika at the time) took place in 1954 at Arusha. It was held shortly before the First Tuskers Copperbelt tour later that year and served as a selection trial for the tour. This match was won by Kenya though the exact score is not known. The next year the fixture was repeated, again at Arusha, Tanganyika winning by 11 points to 3. The third match occurred a year later in 1956, again at Arusha; Kenya winning this encounter 0–13.) (1954)

Biggest win
- Kenya 96–3 Nigeria (10 August 1987)

Biggest defeat
- Portugal 85–0 Kenya (Dubai, United Arab Emirates; 12 November 2022)

World Cup
- Appearances: 0
- Website: www.kru.co.ke

The Kenya national rugby union team, commonly known as the Simbas (Swahili for lions), is the country's national team managed by the Kenya Rugby Union. The team plays in red, green, and black jerseys with black or white shorts. The Simbas represent Kenya in the Africa Cup and various other tournaments across the continent. They currently rank 34 in the World Rugby Rankings and fourth in Africa. Kenya is yet to qualify for the Rugby World Cup.

The Simbas' home ground is the RFUEA Ground which opened to an East Africa side against the British and Irish Lions in 1955.

== History ==
=== Early history (1909–1960s) ===
Rugby Union was introduced to Kenya at the beginning of the 20th century by British settlers and the first recorded match was in 1909. The game was initially restricted to whites only.

In 1923, the primary club in Kenya, Nairobi District, was split into Nondescripts RFC and Kenya Harlequin F.C., due to the club's overwhelming strength. In the 1950s the first internationals began taking place. Early competitions included the Nairobi District Championships first held in 1925, a Royal Armed Forces tournament first held in 1937 and the Enterprise Cup which has been in existence since 1930.

Kenya played host to touring sides between the 1920s and the 1950s; notably including University of Cape Town, Stellenbosch University and a Combined Universities (Oxford and Cambridge) team at Mitchell Park Stadium in 1951.

By 1953, the Rugby Football Union of East Africa was formed to oversee rugby in the three East African colonies of Kenya, Uganda and Tanganyika. A Kenya Colony team played a Tanganyika team for the first time in 1954 and a Uganda Protectorate team in 1958 with the Kenyan representative side winning 21–11. Often, the Kenyan side was combined with other East African nations, and composed of players of European ethnicity. While the results were often lopsided, these games provided a huge amount of revenue for rugby in Kenya, and were incredibly beneficial. Kenya, as an independent side, played its first game against Tanganyika, proving to be victorious.

=== Independence and integration (1970s–1980s) ===
Post-independence, the desegregation of the Kenyan school system meant that indigenous black Africans' featured in the rugby sides of elite schools such as Duke of York and Prince of Wales. Players such as Chris Onsotti, John Gichinga, Dennis Awori, George Kariuki and Jim Owino would form the first generation of indigenous black African rugby players.

In 1972, Ted Kabetu became the first indigenous black Kenyan to play for the East Africa Tuskers in a match against Richmond RFC. That same year, the Tuskers toured Ireland, playing Irish club sides, achieving moderate success and winning 3 out of their 8 tests; Chris Onsotti became the first forward black Tusker playing at prop on the Fourth Tuskers Tour of Ireland in 1972; and Jackson "Jacko" Omaido a school boy at Lenana School (formerly Duke of York) represented the Tuskers playing at fly-half at a 1975 tour of Zambia.

An influx of players from Tanganyika due to a flight of expatriates would boost the Kenyan game. During the early 1970s, a number of English clubs began touring Kenya, playing unofficial test matches against the Tuskers. This included Harlequins RFC nearly being beaten, only for the Tuskers to lose 20–15.

After an invitation in the local dailies to black African rugby players, Miro RFC was formed as an invitational side; rather like the Barbarians or local equivalents, Scorpions RFC. Miro were an all black African side and included two white players (Doug Hamilton and Pat Orr); considered to have played an important role in bringing black Africans into rugby in Kenya. The team played Rugby Roma Olimpic in 1976, winning 20–12. However, the side was disbanded over questions of the racial selection of players.

The Tuskers, by the mid 1970s being fully integrated with both black and whites, faced Zambia, winning 4 tests out of 5. Around this time, some clubs began folding due to the flight of white expatriate players. Despite the growth, conflicts emerged between the black Kenyan players and the many clubs which were still run by expatriates; Miro RFC played again in 1979, this time recording triumph against Blackheath F.C. 32–19, providing major hope for black African rugby.

Mean Machine RFC and Mwamba RFC both founded in 1977 as indigenous African rugby sides. Mean Machine, a representative side of the University of Nairobi featuring Absalom "Bimbo" Mutere, Thomas Onyango Oketch and football international Joe "JJ" Masiga were notable for winning the Kenya Cup on their first attempt. Black Blad RFC representing Kenyatta University College would follow thereafter. Mean Machine were however disbanded as a result of the closure of Nairobi University after the failed coup of 1982.

Miro RFC continued to play, but lost to the Metropolitan Police club of London 40–9, a side that was described as "makeshift". Around this time, the Tuskers played their last tour in 1982, defeating Zimbabwe and Zambia. The 1980s also saw the introduction of the sevens game. However, the 1980s also saw a decline in the national side; for example, during a qualifier play-off against Zimbabwe, Kenya lost all three of their matches; by the end of the 1980s, Kenya lost to Zimbabwe 56–9.

=== Mixed fortunes (1990s–present) ===
The Simba XV logo

Kenya had firmly established stability in its domestic scene, with the game being picked up by the natives, and a league being established. During the 2000s Kenya began to start experiencing success again at the international level, finally being able to consistently record victories against sides such as Zimbabwe and Uganda.

For the 2007 Rugby World Cup qualifiers, the team defeated both Tunisia and Namibia at home, only to lose their away legs.

The team again failed to qualify for the 2011 Rugby World Cup, losing to Tunisia. In 2011, Kenya won the Africa Cup, beating Tunisia in the final 16–7 after both Morocco and Namibia withdrew due to financial constraints; the following season saw Kenya regress and struggle against Uganda and Zimbabwe, only defeating Tunisia to avoid relegation. The 2013 season proved to be a pivotal moment in Kenyan rugby, as they beat both Uganda and Zimbabwe, winning the Africa Cup for the second time, and the first time in a full four team pool.

The Kenyan national team competed in the South African domestic Vodacom Cup competition in 2014, playing as the Simba XV. The Simba XV were based in Cape Town for the duration of the competition and won their opening match, beating the Eastern Province Kings 17–10. However, they lost their remaining six matches to finish in seventh spot in the Southern Section.

The preparation aided in the 2014 Africa Cup with Kenya earning victory over both Madagascar and Namibia. A loss to Zimbabwe on match day three resulted in a third-place finish on points difference and Kenya failing to qualify for the 2015 Rugby World Cup. In May 2015, Kenya played a European team for the first time since the East Africa sides of the 1970s and 1980s, defeating Portugal 41–15 in a test match at the RFUEA Ground.

In 2016, the Kenya Rugby Union announced a sponsorship deal with betting firm Sportpesa, to a deal worth up to KSh.607 million/=; this is the most lucrative sponsorship deal in Kenyan rugby history, and figures not only to fund 7s and men's XVs, but the women's and youth game as well. In September of that year, the KRU formally applied to be included in the South African Currie Cup.

== Record ==
Below is a table of the representative rugby matches played by a Kenya national XV at test level up until 19 July 2025, updated after match with Algeria.

| Opponent | Played | Won | Lost | Drawn | Win % | For | Aga | Diff |
|---|---|---|---|---|---|---|---|---|
| Algeria | 3 | 1 | 2 | 0 | 33.33% | 53 | 68 | -15 |
| Arabian Gulf | 4 | 2 | 2 | 0 | 50% | 66 | 141 | -75 |
| Brazil | 3 | 3 | 0 | 0 | 100% | 81 | 72 | +9 |
| Botswana | 1 | 1 | 0 | 0 | 100% | 80 | 9 | +71 |
| Canada | 1 | 0 | 1 | 0 | 0% | 19 | 65 | -46 |
| Chile | 1 | 0 | 1 | 0 | 0% | 3 | 23 | -20 |
| Ivory Coast | 1 | 1 | 0 | 0 | 100% | 20 | 17 | +3 |
| Cameroon | 4 | 4 | 0 | 0 | 100% | 156 | 55 | +101 |
| Germany | 2 | 0 | 2 | 0 | 0% | 35 | 73 | -38 |
| Hong Kong | 7 | 1 | 5 | 1 | 14.29% | 169 | 220 | -51 |
| Madagascar | 4 | 1 | 2 | 1 | 25% | 94 | 73 | +21 |
| Morocco | 4 | 2 | 2 | 0 | 50% | 65 | 98 | -33 |
| Namibia | 14 | 2 | 13 | 0 | 14.29% | 252 | 678 | -426 |
| Nigeria | 1 | 1 | 0 | 0 | 100% | 96 | 3 | +93 |
| Portugal | 2 | 1 | 1 | 0 | 50% | 41 | 100 | -59 |
| Russia | 1 | 0 | 1 | 0 | 0% | 10 | 31 | -21 |
| Senegal | 4 | 3 | 1 | 0 | 75% | 122 | 69 | +53 |
| Spain | 1 | 1 | 0 | 0 | 100% | 36 | 27 | +9 |
| Tunisia | 10 | 7 | 3 | 0 | 70% | 354 | 219 | +135 |
| United Arab Emirates | 2 | 2 | 0 | 0 | 100% | 109 | 41 | +68 |
| Uganda | 40 | 27 | 11 | 2 | 67.5% | 1,003 | 653 | +350 |
| United States | 1 | 0 | 1 | 0 | 0% | 14 | 68 | -54 |
| Zambia | 8 | 7 | 1 | 0 | 87.5% | 238 | 115 | +123 |
| Zimbabwe | 23 | 9 | 14 | 0 | 39.13% | 530 | 610 | -80 |
| Total | 142 | 76 | 62 | 4 | 53.52% | 3,645 | 3,529 | +116 |

=== World Cup record ===
| World Cup record | | | | | | | | World Cup Qualification record | | | | | |
| Year | Round | P | W | D | L | F | A | P | W | D | L | F | A |
|---|---|---|---|---|---|---|---|---|---|---|---|---|---|
| (Australia) (New Zealand) 1987 | Not invited | | | | | | | - | | | | | |
| (United Kingdom) (Republic of Ireland) (France) 1991 | did not enter | | | | | | | did not enter | | | | | |
| (South Africa) 1995 | did not qualify | | | | | | | 3 | 1 | 0 | 2 | 40 | 125 |
| (Wales) 1999 | did not qualify | | | | | | | 2 | 1 | 0 | 1 | 42 | 70 |
| (Australia) 2003 | did not qualify | | | | | | | 2 | 1 | 0 | 1 | 60 | 42 |
| (France) 2007 | did not qualify | | | | | | | 6 | 3 | 1 | 2 | 111 | 191 |
| (New Zealand) 2011 | did not qualify | | | | | | | 2 | 1 | 0 | 1 | 91 | 52 |
| (England) 2015 | did not qualify | | | | | | | 5 | 4 | 0 | 1 | 153 | 178 |
| (Japan) 2019 | did not qualify | | | | | | | 13 | 7 | 1 | 5 | 474 | 420 |
| Total | 0/8 | 0 | 0 | 0 | 0 | 0 | 0 | 33 | 18 | 2 | 13 | 971 | 1078 |

=== Africa Cup record ===
- 2000 - 2002 – Did not participate
- 2003 – Pool stage
- 2004 – Pool stage
- 2005 – Pool stage
- 2006 – Pool stage
- 2007 – Third place
- 2008–09 – North Trophy runners-up
- 2010 – withdrew
- 2011 – Champions
- 2012 – Third place
- 2013 – Champions
- 2014 – Third place
- 2015 – Third place
- 2016 – Second place
- 2017 – Second place
- 2018 – Second place
- 2019-Second place
- 2022-Second place

== Players ==
=== Current squad ===
Kenyan 31-man squad to compete in the 2022 Rugby World Cup Repecharge

Forwards
| Player | Position | Club |
|---|---|---|
| Teddy Akala | Hooker | (Kenya) Kabras Sugar RC |
| Eugene Sifuna | Hooker | (Kenya) Kabras Sugar RC |
| Brian Waraba | Hooker | Kenya Harlequins |
| Edward Mwaura | Prop | (Kenya) Menengai Oilers RC |
| Joseph Odero | Prop | (Kenya) Kabras Sugar RC |
| Ephraim Oduor | Prop | (Kenya) Kabras Sugar RC |
| Patrick Ouko | Prop | Kenya Commercial Bank |
| Andrew Simiyu | Prop | (South Africa) University of Johannesburg |
| Ian Masheti | Prop | (Kenya) Impala Sports Club |
| Brian Juma Otieno | Lock | (Kenya) Kabras Sugar RC |
| Thomas Okeyo Ongera | Lock | (South Africa) University of Johannesburg |
| Malcolm Onsando | Lock | (Romania) CS Dinamo București |
| Clinton Odhiambo | Lock | (Kenya) Menengai Oilers RC |
| Daniel Sikuta (c) | Flanker | (Kenya) Kabras Sugar RC |
| Josh Weru | Flanker | (France) | Dax |
| Martin Owilah | Flanker | Kenya Commercial Bank |
| Bethwel Anami | Number eight | (Kenya) Strathmore Leos |

Backs
| Player | Position | Club |
|---|---|---|
| Samuel Asati | Scrum-half | Kenya Commercial Bank RFC |
| Brian Tanga | Scrum-half | (Kenya) Kabras Sugar RC |
| Samson Onsumu | Scrum-half | (Kenya) Menengai Oilers RC |
| Amon Wamalwa | Fly-half | (Kenya) Homeboyz RC |
| Geoffrey Ominde | Fly-half | (Kenya) Menengai Oilers RC |
| Bryceson Adaka | Centre | (Kenya) Kabras Sugar RC |
| Timothy Omela | Winger | (Kenya) Menengai Oilers RC |
| John Okoth | Centre | (Kenya) Menengai Oilers RC |
| Peter Kilonzo | Center | Kenya Commercial Bank RFC |
| Beldad Peter Ogeta Obia | Wing | (Kenya) Menengai Oilers RC |
| Jacob Ojee | Wing | Kenya Commercial Bank RFC |
| Geoffrey Okwach | Wing | Kenya Commercial Bank RFC |
| Darwin Mukidza | Full-back | Kenya Commercial Bank RFC |

=== Notable former players ===
- Peter Munyu
- Jackson Omaido
- Sammy Khakame
- Felix Clement Ochieng
- Innocent Simiyu
- Max Muniafu
- Dan Weku
- Derrick Wamalwa
- Oscar Osir
- Benjamin Ayimba
- Paul Murunga
- Ted Omondi
- Edward Rombo
- Humphrey Kayange
- Joel Nganga
- Vincent Ongera
- Richard Nyakwaka
- Martin Likami
- Dennis Mwanja
- David Francombe
- Lucas Onyango
- Joshua Chisanga
- Wilson Kopondo
- Allan Omuka
- Curtis Lilako
- Isaac Adimo
- Patrice Agunda
- Dennis Mwanja

== Simbas ==
The following players were included in the Simbas squad for the 2022 Currie Cup First Division:

Simbas
| **Props**: Ian Karanja; Edwin Njuguna; Joseph Nyagol; **Ephraim Oduor**; **Patrick Ouko**; **Andrew Siminyu**; **Hookers**: Teddy Akala; Toby Francombe; **Eugene Sifuna**; Brian Waraba; **Colman Were**; **Locks**: Shem Angugo; Manasseh Auma; **Davis Chenge**; **Brian Juma**; Clinton Juma; **Oliver Kizito**; Thomas Ongera; **Malcolm Onsando**; Emmanuel Silungi | **Loose forwards**: Oscar Ouma Achieng; Brian Masinza; Elkeans Mukamiti; Bethwel Muteshi; Mark Mutuku; Brian Ndirangu; **George Nyambua**; Kevin Nyongesa; Felix Ojow; **Martin Omondi**; Chrispine Shitundo; **Daniel Sikuta** (c); **Scrum-halves**: **Samuel Asati**; Brian Maragwa; **Brian Tanga**; Michael Walyaula; **Fly-halves**: Owain Ashley; Anthony Mboya; Geoffrey Ominde; Jone Tavaga | **Centres**: Bryceson Adaka; Dominic Coulson; Collins Emonyi; **Peter Kilonzo**; Maxwell Oketch; **John Okeyo**; Vincent Owino; **Wingers**: **Willy Ambaka**; Derrick Ashihundu; Timothy Ejakait; Michael Kimwele; **Andrew Matoka**; Beldad Ogeta; **Jacob Ojee**; **Fullbacks**: Isaac Ikigu; Darwin Kinyangi; Jeff Mutukugi |
(c) Denotes team captain and **Bold** denotes internationally capped.

== Past coaches ==
| Years | Coach |
|---|---|
| 2001–2003 | (Kenya) Ken Thimba |
| 2003 | (Kenya) Benjamin Ayimba (interim) |
| 2004–2006 | (Kenya) Thomas Odundo |
| 2006 | (Kenya) Manuel Okoth |
| 2007–2012 | (Kenya) Michael Otieno |
| 2013–2017 | (South Africa) Jerome Paarwater |
| 2018–2019 | (New Zealand) Ian Snook |
| 2019–2022 | (Kenya) Paul Odera |
| 2023 – present | (South Africa) Jerome Paarwater |

== 2019 Results ==
| 22 June 2019 | Kenya | 13 –16 | Uganda | Kisumu Stadium Kenya |

| 13 July 2019 | Uganda | 5–16 | Kenya | Legends Rugby StadiumKampala |

| 27 July 2019 | Zambia | 23–43 | Kenya | Ndola Zambia |

| 3 August 2019 | Zimbabwe | 30–29 | Kenya | HarareZimbabwe |

| 24 August 2019 | Kenya | 30–16 | Zambia | RFUEA Kenya |

| 21 September 2019 | Kenya | 36–14 | Zimbabwe | Nakuru Sports Club Kenya |

== 2018 Results ==
| 26 May 2018 | Uganda | 16 – 34 | Kenya | Legends Rugby Grounds, Kampala |
| 16:00 EAT (UTC+03) | Try: Mugerwa; Con: P. Wokorach; Pen: Magomu (3/3) | Report | Try: Ojee; Mangeni; Seje; Musonye; Adema; Con: Mukidza (3/5); Pen: Mukidza (1/1) | Referee: Cwengile Jadezweni (South Africa) |

| 23 June 2018 | Morocco | 24 – 28 | Kenya | Stade du C.O.C., Casablanca |
| 17:00 WEST (UTC+01) | Try: Idrissi 11' m Boukanoucha 28' m Arabat 48' c Nassik 71' c Con: Chakir (1/3) 49'; Brichet (1/1) 72' | Report | Try: Adema 3' c Onyango 51' c, 65' c Amusala 57'; Con: Darwin Mukidza (4/4) 4', 52', 58', 65 | Attendance: 800; Referee: Sebastien Minery (France) |

| 30 June 2018 | Kenya | 45 – 36 | Zimbabwe | RFUEA Ground, Nairobi |
| 15:00 EAT (UTC+03) | Try: Chenge 4', 13', 17' c Onyango 20' m Penalty Try 36'; Owilla 79' m Chituyi 80+2' c Con: Mukidza (4/6) 5', 14', 19', 80+3' | Report | Try: Parirenyatwa 10' m Mutamangira 26' c Makanda 40+4' m Mudariki 41' m Penalty Try 45'; McNab 54' c Con: Tambwera (2/5) 28', 55' | Attendance: 5,000; Referee: Tual Trainini (France) |

| 7 July 2018 | Kenya | 38 – 22 | Uganda | RFUEA Ground, Nairobi |
| 15:00 EAT (UTC+03) | Try: Ojee 6' c Chenge 20' c Onsomu 28' c Ayange 36' c Amusala 80+1' c Con: Mukidza (5/5) 8', 21', 29', 37', 80+2'; Pen: Mukidza (1/1) 49' | Report | Try: Wokorach 14' m, 71' m Magomu 45' c Okorach 62' m Con: Wokorach 46' | Attendance: 3,200; Referee: Quinton Immelman (South Africa) |

| 11 August 2018 | Kenya | 67 – 0 | Tunisia | RFUEA Ground, Nairobi |
| 14:00 EAT (UTC+03) | Try: Ambaka 5' c, 79' m Chenge 21' c Chogo 23' c Ojee 27' c Musonye 31' c Mukidza 36' m Owilla 41' m Karia 55' m Omollo 66' c Opondo 74' m Con: Mukidza (5/6) 6', 21', 24', 28', 32; Omollo (1/4) 67'; Mose (0/1) | Report | | Attendance: 7,000; Referee: Julien Castaignede (France) |

| 18 August 2018 | Namibia | 53 – 28 | Kenya | Hage Geingob Rugby Stadium |
| 16:00 WAT (UTC+01) | Try: Botha 24' c, 71' c Westhuizen 27' c, 42' c Loubser 34' m Tjeriko 57' c Penalty Try 62'; Con: Loubser (5/6) 25', 28', 43', 59', 72'; Pen: Loubser (2/2) 5', 52' | Report | Try: Ambaka 13' c, 55' c Onsando 66' c Omollo 74' c Con: Mukidza (4/4) 15', 56', 67', 75' | Attendance: 5,000; Referee: Egon Seconds (South Africa) |

| 11 November 2018 | Canada | 65 – 19 | Kenya | Pierre-Delort Stadium, Marseille |
| 13:00 CET(UTC+01) | Try: van der Merwe (3) 9' c, 29' m, 76' c Beukeboom (2) 12' m, 61' c Sauder (2) 39' c, 54' m Ardron 50' c Sheppard 69' c Evans 70' m Con: McRorie (5/9) 10', 40', 51', 62', 69'; Sauder (1/1) 77'; Pen: McRorie (1/1) 2' | Report | Try: Onyango 17' m Owade 32' c Nyambua 43' c Con: Mukidza (1/2) 43'; Oliech (1/1) 32' | Referee: Wayne Barnes (England) |

| 17 November 2018 | Hong Kong | 42 – 17 | Kenya | Pierre-Delort Stadium, Marseille |
| 14:00 CET(UTC+01) | Try: Denmark 29' c Hewson 49' c Fenn 54' c Lamboley (2) 64' c, 70' c Warner 81' c Con: Rimene (4/4) 30', 50', 55', 65'; Rosslee (2/2) 71', 83' | | Try: Opondo (2) 16' c, 57' m Musonye 22' m Con: Oliech (1/3) 17' | Attendance: 1,500; Referee: Jaco Peyper (South Africa) |

| 23 November 2018 | Kenya | 6 – 43 | Germany | Pierre-Delort Stadium, Marseille |
| 18:00 CET(UTC+01) | Try: Oliech (2/3) 2', 38' | | Try: Ferreira 22'c, 58'c, 70'c Haupt 40+1'm Otto 45'c Leibig 50'c Aounallah 79'c Con: Parkinson (5/7) 22', 46', 52', 71', 80+1' | Referee: Angus Gardner (Australia) |

2017 Test Matches

| 27 May 2017 | Kenya | 29 – 30 | Germany | RFUEA Ground, Nairobi |
| 16:00 EAT (UTC+03) | Try: Kerre 3' m Kopondo 17' c Onsomu 50' c Ambunya 60' c Con: Mukidza (3/4) 18', 51', 61'; Pen: Mukidza (1/2) 70' | Report | Try: Poppmeier 25' c Brenner 42' m Els 65' c Aounallah 73' m Con: Parkinson (1/2) 26'; Hilsenbeck (1/2) 66'; Pen: Parkinson (1/1) 2'; Hilsenbeck (0/1); Murphy (0/1); Drop: Hilsenbeck (1/1) 80+1' | Attendance: 10,000; Referee: Cwengile Jadezweni (South Africa) |

| 10 June 2017 | Uganda | 18 – 23 | Kenya | Legends Rugby Grounds, Kampala |
| 16:00 EAT (UTC+03) | Try: M. Odongo 15' m Odong 39' c Con: P. Wokorach (1/2) 40'; Pen: P. Wokorach (2/4) 20', 27' | Report | Try: Onsomu 12' c Owilla 43' c Con: Mukidza (2/2) 13' 44'; Pen: Mukidza (3/3) 3' 65' 67' | Referee: Jaco Kotze (South Africa) |

| 20 August 2017 | Kenya | 19 – 19 | Hong Kong | RFUEA Ground, Nairobi |
| 15:00 EAT (UTC+03) | Try: Nyambua 19' c Olaba 36' m Muhanji 63' c Con: Andola (2/3) 20', 64' | Report | Try: Parfitt 7' c Purvis 12' c Slatem 49' m Con: Rosslee (2/3) 8', 13' | Referee: Egon Seconds (South Africa) |

| 26 August 2017 | Kenya | 34 – 43 | Hong Kong | RFUEA Ground, Nairobi |
| 16:00 EAT (UTC+03) | Try: Onyango 59' c Onsomu 62' c Chenge 72' c Mukidza 79' c Con: Mukidza (4/4) 59', 64', 73', 79'; Pen: Mukidza (2/2) 7', 24' | Report | Try: Sullivan 36' c Jans 53' c Ng Wai Shing 56' c Lamming 76' c Con: Rosslee (4/4) 37', 54', 57', 77'; Pen: Rosslee (5/5) 3', 13', 20', 45', 68' | Referee: Rasta Rasivhenge (South Africa) |

=== Africa Cup ===
| 24 June 2017 | Kenya | 33 – 33 | Uganda | RFUEA Ground, Nairobi |
| 16:00 EAT (UTC+03) | Try: Ojee (2) 22' m,54' c Amusala 31' m Penalty try 77' c Con: Mukidza (1/3) 55', 77'; Pen: Mukidza (3/3) 19', 40', 60' | Report | Try: Uhuru 8' c Asaba 44' c M. Wokorach 72' c Con: P. Wokorach (3/3) 9', 45', 73'; Pen: P. Wokorach (4/4) 5', 39', 63', 69' | Referee: Laurent Cardona (France) |

| 8 July 2017 | Kenya | 100 – 10 | Tunisia | RFUEA Ground, Nairobi |
| 16:00 EAT (UTC+03) | Try: Ojee (3) 10' c, 34' m, 80' c Mukidza (2) 19' c, 73' c Kerre (2) 25' m, 67' c Ambunya 22' c Onsomu 32' c Chisanga 39' m Chenge 41' m Onyango 44' c Seje 50' c Owilla 58' c Otieno 64' c Con: Mukidza (9/13) 11', 20', 23', 33', 45', 51', 59', 65', 68'; Andola (2/2) 74', 80'; Pen: Mukidza (1/1) 14' | Report | Try: Ben Hamouda 29' m Dhif 37'; Con: Kherfami (0/2); Pen: Khalfi (0/1) | Referee: Tual Trainini (France) |

| 15 July 2017 | Kenya | 45 – 25 | Senegal | RFUEA Ground, Nairobi |
| 14:00 EAT (UTC+03) | Try: Mukidza 7' m, 10' c, 79' c Chisanga 26' m Chenge 40+2' c Ambunya 48' c Ikambili 61' c Con: Mukidza (4/6) 11', 40+3', 48', 62'; Andola (1/1) 79' | Report | Try: Sargos 18' c Mendy 64' c, 80+1' m Con: Courtinard (1/1) 19'; Sargos (1/2) 65'; Pen: Sargos (2/2) 3', 52' | Referee: Thomas Charabas (France) |

| 22 July 2017 | Zimbabwe | 22 – 41 | Kenya | Hartsfield Rugby Grounds, Bulawayo |
| 15:30 CAT (UTC+02) | Try: Mudariki 7' c Kumadiro 23' m Pritchard 52' c Con: Makwanya (2/3) 8', 52'; Pen: Makwanya (1/2) 47' | Report | Try: Onsomu 18' c Chenge 28' c Amusala 41' c Owilla 66' c K'Opondo 69' c Con: Mukidza (5/5) 18', 29', 42', 67', 70'; Pen: Mukidza (2/3) 3', 80' | Referee: Lesego Legoete (South Africa) |

| 29 July 2017 | Namibia | 45 – 7 | Kenya | Hage Geingob Rugby Stadium |
| 16:00 WAT (UTC+01) | Try: Philander 8' c, 58' m Botha 19' c Loubser 45' m Greyling 49' c Viviers 72' c Klim 75' c Con: Loubser (4/6) 9', 21', 50', 72'; Kotze (1/1) 75' | Report | Try: Amusala 53'; Con: Adimo (1/1) 54' | Referee: Egon Seconds (South Africa) |

=== Hong Kong Cup of Nations ===
| 10 November 2017 | Kenya | 3 – 23 | Chile | King's Park Sports Ground |
| 17:00 HKT(UTC+08) | Pen: Mukidza (1/1) 27' | Report | Try: Ianiszewski 56' c Soto 67' c Con: Ianiszewski (2/2) 56', 68'; Pen: Ianiszewski (3/4) 18', 38', 70' | Referee: Maxime Burlet (Belgium) |

| 14 November 2017 | Russia | 31 – 10 | Kenya | King's Park Sports Ground |
| 17:00 HKT(UTC+08) | Try: Davydov 28' c Nepeyvoda 32', 38' c Sychev 48' c Ryabov 60'; Con: Gaisin (3/5) 29', 39', 49 | Report | Try: Simiyu 50' c Con: Mukidza (1/1) 51'; Pen: Mukidza (1/1) 8' | Referee: Stephen Copeman (Hong Kong) |

| 18 November 2017 | Hong Kong | 40 – 30 | Kenya | Hong Kong Football Club Stadium |
| 17:00 HKT(UTC+08) | Try: Hartley (2) 4' m, 64' c Fenn 7', c Rauca 21' c Yiu Kam Shing 54' m Con: Rosslee (3/5) 8', 22', 65'; Pen: Rosslee (3/3) 12, 70', 77' | Report | Try: Ikambili 31' c Onsomu 50' c Mose 60' m Mangeni 66' m Con: Mukidza (2/4) 32', 52'; Pen: Mukidza (2/3) 15', 20' | Referee: Federico Anselmi (Argentina) |

== See also ==
- Kenya national rugby sevens team
- Kenya women's national rugby sevens team
- Kenya women's national rugby union team
- Kenya Cup
- Enterprise Cup
- Eric Shirley Shield
- Nationwide League
