= Rugby union in Botswana =

- The BRU
- Country: Botswana
- Governing body: Botswana Rugby Union
- National team: Botswana
- Nickname: Vultures
- Registered players: 6,805
- Clubs: 23

National competitions
- Rugby World Cup; Africa Cup; Rugby World Cup Sevens; IRB Sevens World Series

Rugby union in Botswana is a growing sport.

== Governing body ==
The Governing Body of Rugby Union in Botswana is the BRU (Botswana Rugby Union). The President is Mr. Elijah Jones. Ever since the formation of the Botswana Rugby Union in 1992, the matters of the association have always been run by a B.R.U Executive Committee made up of the President, Secretary and Treasurer who are all elected into position in the annual AGM. The executive committee was expanded in 2007 to include Vice-President and an additional member. The general committee is made up of representatives of clubs, referees and school coordinators inclusive of the executive committee. All the positions in the union are on voluntary basis.

== History ==
Like Rugby union in Kenya and Rugby union in Zimbabwe, Botswana Rugby has suffered from having been played mainly by the white community, and being seen as a hangover from colonial days. Also, like most African nations, Rugby is mainly played in and around the capital, Gaborone.

However, Botswana's proximity to the major Rugby playing nation of South Africa, and 2 time world cup competitors Zimbabwe, has meant that Botswana has received a constant flow of touring sides, and other African nations. Rugby union in South Africa is a major Sport - the country has both hosted and won the Rugby World Cup - and, Botswana is saturated by South African media of various types. Because of this, Botswana can therefore be considered one of several countries within South African Rugby's sphere of influence - including Namibia, Lesotho, Zimbabwe, Zambia and Eswatini.

In 1997, there were 26 Rugby clubs in Botswana.

Botswana competes in the Africa Cup every time.

== Notable players ==
- Roddy Grant, with Edinburgh Rugby born in Botswana and raised in South Africa.

== See also ==
- Botswana national rugby union team
