= Oliver Kizito =

Kenyan rugby union player

- Born: Oliver Mangeni Kizito; 14 February 1988 (age 38) Kenya
- Height: 1.92 m (6 ft 3 1/2 in)
- Weight: 95 kg (15.0 st; 209 lb)

Rugby union career
- Position: Lock
Senior career
Years	Team	Apps	(Points)
2014	Simba XV	6	(0)
2022–	Simbas		
- Correct as of 18 April 2022
International career
Years	Team	Apps	(Points)
2016–	Kenya	14	(10)
- Correct as of 18 April 2022
National sevens team
Years	Team		Comps
2014	Kenya Sevens		3
- Correct as of 18 April 2022

Oliver Mangeni Kizito (born 14 February 1988) is a Kenyan rugby union player, currently playing for the Simbas in the 2022 Currie Cup First Division. His preferred position is lock.

== Professional career ==
Kizito represented Simba XV in the 2014 Vodacom Cup. He was then named in the Simbas squad for the 2022 Currie Cup First Division. Kizito is a Kenyan international in both 15-a-side and sevens.
