= Daniel Sikuta =

Kenyan rugby union player (born 1992)

- Born: 28 December 1992 (age 33) Kenya
- Height: 1.88 m (6 ft 2 in)
- Weight: 102 kg (16.1 st; 225 lb)

Rugby union career
- Position: Flanker
Senior career
Years	Team	Apps	(Points)
2022–	Simbas		
- Correct as of 18 April 2022
International career
Years	Team	Apps	(Points)
2016–	Kenya	3	(0)
- Correct as of 18 April 2022
National sevens team
Years	Team		Comps
2013–2020	Kenya Sevens		36
- Correct as of 18 April 2022

Daniel Sikuta (born 28 December 1992) is a Kenyan rugby union player, currently playing for the Simbas in the 2022 Currie Cup First Division. His preferred position is flanker.

== Professional career ==
Sikuta was named in the Simbas squad for the 2022 Currie Cup First Division. Chenge is a Kenyan international in both 15-a-side and sevens.
