= Swaziland national rugby sevens team =

The Swaziland national rugby sevens team is a minor national sevens side. It has competed at the Commonwealth Sevens

== See also ==
- Swaziland national rugby union team
- Rugby union in Swaziland
