= Rugby union in Lesotho =

Organization

- Country: Lesotho
- Governing body: Federation of Lesotho Rugby
- National team: Lesotho
- First played: 19th Century

Rugby union in Lesotho, and its predecessor Basutoland is a minor but growing sport.

== Governing body ==
The governing body is the Federation of Lesotho Rugby. On 14 November 2024, Lesotho was granted World Rugby Full Member status by the World Rugby Council.

== History ==
Rugby in Lesotho began after the year 2000 given the influx of students studying in South African schools where rugby union is a major sport. It was further intensified by the expatriate population who worked with local people to develop rugby. In 2008, National University of Lesotho organized a team known as NUL Spears Rugby Club. The club only participated in Intervarsity held between universities of Botswana, Lesotho and Swaziland.

Rugby is centred on the national capital, and only sizable city, Maseru. Lesotho's poverty and lack of infrastructure make it difficult to maintain a proper national league structure.

The country is surrounded on all sides by South Africa. Rugby union in South Africa is a major sport - the country has both hosted and won the Rugby World Cup - and Lesotho is saturated by South African media of various types. Lesotho can therefore be considered one of several countries within South African rugby's sphere of influence - including Namibia, Zimbabwe, Swaziland, and Botswana.

== Maseru Kings ==
In late 2011 the Maseru Kings Rugby Club was established in the capital. The team joined and began competing in the Eastern Free State leagues in South Africa in May 2012. As the only team regularly playing in Lesotho the Maseru Kings have become the de facto national team.

== See also ==
- Lesotho national rugby union team
- Rugby Africa
- Africa Cup
