= Derrick Ashihundu =

Kenyan rugby union player

- Born: 1 January 1998 (age 28) Kenya

Rugby union career
- Position: Wing
Senior career
Years	Team	Apps	(Points)
2022–	Simbas		
- Correct as of 18 April 2022
National sevens team
Years	Team		Comps
2022–	Kenya Sevens		2
- Correct as of 18 April 2022

Derrick Ashihundu (born 1 January 1998) is a Kenyan rugby union player, currently playing for the Simbas in the 2022 Currie Cup First Division. His preferred position is wing.

== Professional career ==
Ashihundu was named in the Simbas squad for the 2022 Currie Cup First Division. Ashihundu is a Kenyan international in rugby sevens.
