= 2007 Rugby World Cup – Africa qualification =

International rugby union competition Africa

Tournament details
- Dates: 12 March 2005 – 11 November 2006
- No. of nations: 13

In qualifying for the 2007 Rugby World Cup, there was one place available for African teams, and one place in the repechage. In the group rounds, there were three points awarded for a win, two for a draw, and one for a loss. There were no bonus points awarded.

Namibia won the qualification process and qualified as Africa 1. Morocco, as Africa 2, advanced to the Repechage Round, where they were defeated by Portugal.

== Qualification process ==
=== Round 1a ===
Two groups of three teams each, winners of each group playoff for one place in Africa Round 1b.

=== Round 1b ===
Two groups of three teams each, winners of each group qualify for Africa Round 2, second placed teams playoff for the remaining place in Africa Round 2.

=== Round 2 ===
Two groups of three teams each, winners of each group qualify for Africa Round 3.

=== Round 3 ===
Playoff of the winners of each group in Round 2, winner qualifies for World Cup as Africa 1, Runner up advances to the Repechage Round as Africa 2, to play Europe 4.

== Round 1a ==
=== Northern Pool ===
Final Standings

Advances to playoff

Place	Nation	Games				Points	Table points
Place	Nation	played	won	drawn	lost	difference	Table points
1	Senegal	2	2	0	0	+46	6
2	Cameroon	2	1	0	1	+4	4
3	Nigeria	2	0	0	2	-50	2

Matches

12 March 2005

Senegal	46 - 6	Nigeria

Dakar, Senegal

26 March 2005

Cameroon	0 - 6	Senegal

Douala, Cameroon

16 April 2005

Nigeria	8 - 18	Cameroon

Lagos, Nigeria

=== Southern Pool ===
Final Standings

Advances to playoff

Place	Nation	Games				Points	Table points
Place	Nation	played	won	drawn	lost	difference	Table points
1	Zambia	2	1	0	1	+3	4
2	Botswana	2	1	0	1	+3	4
3	Eswatini	2	1	0	1	-6	4

Matches

12 March 2005

Eswatini	24 - 23	Zambia

Mbabane, Eswatini

09 April 2005

Zambia	28 - 24	Botswana

Lusaka, Zambia

23 April 2005

Botswana	19 - 12	Eswatini

Botswana

=== Playoff ===
Matches

28 May 2005

Senegal	22 - 14	Zambia

Senegal

4 June 2005

Zambia	6 - 13	Senegal

Zambia

Senegal win 35–20 on aggregate and advance to round 1b.

== Round 1b ==
=== Pool A ===
Final Standings

Qualifies to Round 2
Advances to playoff

Place	Nation	Games				Points	Table points
Place	Nation	played	won	drawn	lost	difference	Table points
1	Ivory Coast	2	2	0	0	+44	6
2	Zimbabwe	2	1	0	1	-24	4
3	Senegal	2	0	0	2	-20	2

Matches

25 June 2005

Zimbabwe	21 - 15	Senegal

Zimbabwe

09 July 2005

Senegal	6 - 20	Ivory Coast

Senegal

23 July 2005

Ivory Coast	33 - 3	Zimbabwe

Ivory Coast

Pool B

Final Standings

Qualifies to Round 2
Advances to playoff

Place	Nation	Games				Points	Table points
Place	Nation	played	won	drawn	lost	difference	Table points
1	Kenya	2	1	1	0	+3	5
2	Uganda	2	1	0	1	+1	4
3	Madagascar	2	0	1	1	-4	3

Matches

11 June 2005

Kenya	24 - 24	Madagascar

Kenya

25 June 2005

Uganda	5 - 8	Kenya

Uganda

10 July 2005

Madagascar	14 - 18	Uganda

Madagascar

=== Playoff ===
Matches

06 August 2005

Zimbabwe	22 - 16	Uganda

Harare, Zimbabwe

20 August 2005

Uganda	20 - 9	Zimbabwe

Kampala, Uganda

Uganda win 36–31 on aggregate and advances to round 2.

== Round 2 ==
=== Pool 1 ===
Final Standings

Qualifies to Round 3

Place	Nation	Games				Points	Table points
Place	Nation	played	won	drawn	lost	difference	Table points
1	Namibia	4	2	0	2	+57	8
2	Tunisia	4	2	0	2	+24	8
3	Kenya	4	2	0	2	-81	8

Matches

27 May 2006

Namibia	82 - 12	Kenya

Windhoek, Namibia

10 June 2006

Kenya	25 - 21	Tunisia

Nairobi, Kenya

01 July 2006

Tunisia	24 - 7	Namibia

Tunis, Tunisia

09 September 2006

Kenya	30 - 26	Namibia

Nairobi, Kenya

23 September 2006

Tunisia	31 - 12	Kenya

Tunis, Tunisia

07 October 2006

Namibia	23 - 15	Tunisia

Windhoek, Namibia

=== Pool 2 ===
Final Standings

Qualifies to Round 3

Place	Nation	Games				Points	Table points
Place	Nation	played	won	drawn	lost	difference	Table points
1	Morocco	4	3	1	0	+51	11
2	Ivory Coast	4	1	1	2	-30	7
3	Uganda	4	1	0	3	-21	6

Matches

03 June 2006

Morocco	36 - 3	Uganda

Casablanca, Morocco

17 June 2006

Ivory Coast	9 - 9	Morocco

Abidjan, Ivory Coast

01 July 2006

Uganda	32 - 7	Ivory Coast

Kampala, Uganda

09 September 2006

Uganda	3 - 5	Morocco

Kampala, Uganda

23 September 2006

Ivory Coast	18 - 7	Uganda

Abidjan, Ivory Coast

07 October 2006

Morocco	23 - 7	Ivory Coast

Casablanca, Morocco

== Round 3 – 2006 ==
28 October 2006

Namibia	25 - 7	Morocco

Windhoek, Namibia

11 November 2006

Morocco	8 - 27	Namibia

Casablanca, Morocco

Namibia won 52–15 on aggregate and qualified directly to Rugby World Cup 2007 as Africa 1. Morocco advanced to the Repechage Round as Africa 2, where they were eliminated by Portugal as Europe 4.
