= Mikheil Tsiklauri =

Georgian rugby union player

- Born: 8 April 1985 (age 41) Georgia
- Height: 182 cm (6 ft 0 in)
- Weight: 119 kg (262 lb; 18 st 10 lb)

Rugby union career
- Position: Prop
- Current team: Black Lion
Senior career
Years	Team	Apps	(Points)
2017–2018	Krasny Yar Krasnoyarsk	6	(0)
2021–	Black Lion	3	(0)
- Correct as of 10 April 2022

Mikheil Tsiklauri (born 8 April 1985 in Georgia) is a Georgian rugby union player who plays for Black Lion in the 2022 Currie Cup First Division. His playing position is prop. He was named in the Black Lion squad for the 2022 Currie Cup First Division. He had previously represented Krasny Yar Krasnoyarsk in the 2017–18 European Rugby Challenge Cup.
