= Martin Omondi =

Kenyan rugby union player

- Born: Martin Owilah Omondi; 31 March 1989 (age 37) Kenya
- Height: 1.89 m (6 ft 2 1/2 in)
- Weight: 98 kg (15.4 st; 216 lb)

Rugby union career
- Position: Flanker
Senior career
Years	Team	Apps	(Points)
2014	Simba XV	6	(5)
2022–	Simbas		
- Correct as of 18 April 2022
International career
Years	Team	Apps	(Points)
2017–	Kenya	12	(15)
- Correct as of 18 April 2022
National sevens team
Years	Team		Comps
2014–2016	Kenya Sevens		3
- Correct as of 18 April 2022

Martin Omondi (born 31 March 1989) is a Kenyan rugby union player, currently playing for the Simbas in the 2022 Currie Cup First Division. His preferred position is flanker.

== Professional career ==
Omondi represented Simba XV in the 2014 Vodacom Cup. He was then named in the Simbas squad for the 2022 Currie Cup First Division. Chenge is a Kenyan international in both 15-a-side and sevens.
