= Jerome Paarwater =

South Africa professional rugby union football coach

- Born: South Africa

Rugby union career
Provincial / State sides
Years	Team	Apps	(Points)
- Western Province
Coaching career
- Years: Team
- 2003–2007: Western Province (Forwards coach)
- 2007–2012: Stormers (Assistant coach)
- 2012-2017: Kenya
- 2022–2023: Western Province
- 2023-: Kenya (Head coach)

Jerome Paarwater is a South African professional rugby union football coach. He is currently the head coach of Kenya. He previously coached the Western Province side that participates in the Currie Cup. and was also the forwards coach with both the Western Province and Stormers.
