= Rugby union in Eswatini =

- Country: Eswatini
- Governing body: Eswatini Rugby Union
- National team: Eswatini
- Registered players: 15,016
- Clubs: 7

Rugby union in Eswatini is a minor sport. As of January 2021, the World Rugby Ranking of their men's national team is 98th.

== Governing body ==
The governing body is the Eswatini Rugby Union.

== History ==
Rugby union was introduced into Eswatini by the British, who ruled the country for a number of years, sometimes indirectly, sometimes directly. However, it was mainly played by the white population, who made little attempt to spread it to the native Swazis, meaning that the game declined when they left.

Rugby is centred on the national capital Mbabane. Eswatini's poverty and lack of infrastructure make it difficult to maintain a proper national league structure, although its small size makes this less of a problem than with certain other African countries.

The country is nearly surrounded on all sides by South Africa, apart from one border with Mozambique. Rugby union in South Africa is a major sport – the country has both hosted and won the Rugby World Cup – and Eswatini is saturated by South African media of various types. Because of this, Eswatini can therefore be considered one of several countries within South African rugby's sphere of influence – including Namibia, Lesotho, Zimbabwe, Eswatini, and Botswana.

== Trivia ==
Eswatini has the highest number of rugby players per capita on the continent of Africa, with 12.9 out of every 1,000 locals being a registered player. This edges out South Africa who officially have 10.0 players per 1,000 people.

== See also ==
- Eswatini national rugby union team
- Eswatini national rugby union team (sevens)
- Confederation of African Rugby
- Africa Cup
