= Biselele Tshamala =

Zimbabwean rugby union player (born 1990)

- Born: 26 November 1990 (age 35) Hwange, Zimbabwe
- Height: 1.92 m (6 ft 3 1/2 in)
- Weight: 90 kg (14 st; 200 lb)

Rugby union career
- Position: Flanker
Senior career
Years	Team	Apps	(Points)
2019	Zimbabwe Academy	5	(10)
2022–	Zimbabwe Goshawks	1	(0)
- Correct as of 3 April 2022
International career
Years	Team	Apps	(Points)
2010	Zimbabwe U20	3	(0)
2016–	Zimbabwe	7	(5)
- Correct as of 3 April 2022
National sevens team
Years	Team		Comps
2013–	Zimbabwe Sevens		10
- Correct as of 3 April 2022

Biselele Tshamala (born 26 November 1990) is a Zimbabwe rugby union player, currently playing for the Zimbabwe Goshawks in the 2022 Currie Cup First Division. His preferred position is flanker.

== Professional career ==
Tshamala represented Zimbabwe Academy in the 2019 Rugby Challenge. He was then named in the Zimbabwe Goshawks squad for the 2022 Currie Cup First Division. Tshamala is a Zimbabwean international in both 15-a-side and sevens.
