= Ted Omondi =

Kenyan rugby union player

- Born: 5 March 1984 (age 42)
- Height: 1.72 m (5 ft 7 1/2 in)
- Weight: 84 kg (13 st 3 lb)

Rugby union career
- Position: Wing
National sevens team
Years	Team	Comps
2006	Kenya 7s	

Ted Omondi (born 5 March 1984) is a Kenyan rugby player.

== Playing career ==
=== Clubs ===
- Taffs Well RFC Wales
- Racing Métro 92 Paris : 2006-2007
- RCA Cergy-Pontoise : 2007-2009
- Rugby Athlétic Club Angérien : since 2009

== Winnings ==
- Kenya national rugby sevens team at the Paris Sevens 2006.
