= Davis Chenge =

Kenyan rugby union player

- Born: 11 June 1991 (age 35) Kenya
- Height: 1.92 m (6 ft 3 1/2 in)
- Weight: 104 kg (16.4 st; 229 lb)

Rugby union career
- Position: Lock / Flanker
Senior career
Years	Team	Apps	(Points)
2014	Simba XV	5	(5)
2022–	Simbas		
- Correct as of 18 April 2022
International career
Years	Team	Apps	(Points)
2017–	Kenya	16	(30)
- Correct as of 18 April 2022
National sevens team
Years	Team		Comps
2012–2014	Kenya Sevens		9
- Correct as of 18 April 2022

Davis Chenge (born 11 June 1991) is a Kenyan rugby union player, currently playing for the Simbas in the 2022 Currie Cup First Division. His preferred position is lock or flanker.

== Professional career ==
Chenge represented Simba XV in the 2014 Vodacom Cup. He was then named in the Simbas squad for the 2022 Currie Cup First Division. Chenge is a Kenyan international in both 15-a-side and sevens.
