= Peter Karia =

- Born: Peter Karia; September 16, 1994 (age 32) Nairobi, Kenya
- Height: 1.78 m (5 ft 10 in)
- Weight: 105 kg (16 st 7 lb)
- School: Ofafa Jericho High School
- University: University of Western Cape

Rugby union career
- Position: Hooker
- Current team: KCB RC
Youth career
- 2012-2013: KCB RC
International career
Years	Team	Apps	(Points)
2015-present	Kenya	11	

Peter Karia (born 16 September 1994) is a Kenyan rugby union player. He plays hooker.

== Career ==
Karia started playing rugby at Ofafa Jericho High School in 2009. He joined Kenya Cup side Mwamba RFC when he was 16.

After finishing High School in 2012, Karia joined KCB rugby club and after playing five matches in the second tier known as Eric Shirley Shield, he was promoted to the senior team that takes part in the Kenya Cup.

In 2015, he got a scholarship to go to South Africa’s University of Western Cape to study Sports management while playing for their rugby team. During his first campaign, UWC reached the Varsity Shield final.

He has played 13 matches for Kenya Simbas side which includes Africa Cup matches against Zimbabwe, Uganda, Namibia and Tunisia as well as tests against Hong Kong, Portugal, Spain, Brazil, Russia and Chile.

== Awards ==
Karia won the 2016 Elgon Cup against Uganda, 2015 and 2017 Kenya Cup with KCB, Impala Floodlit 2013, 2014 and 2015. In the 2014 Floodlit, he was named the most promising player after topping the top try scorer list.

He also won the 2015 Enterprise Cup as well as the 2013 Great Rift 10-aside tournament.

== Personal ==
Karia was born in Nairobi’s Dandora Estate and raised by his single Mother. He was the first child born in his family. He has one sister.

Karia went to Immaculate Primary School till class four before moving to Lavington Primary. His family then moved to Saika estate which forced him to transfer to Josnah Primary School.

In 2009, he joined Ofafa Jericho High School till 2012 after which he joined University of Western Cape.
