= Shingirai Katsvere =

Zimbabwean rugby union player (born 1997)

- Born: Shingirai Katsvere; 10 May 1997 (age 29) Zimbabwe
- Height: 1.79 m (5 ft 10 1/2 in)
- Weight: 82 kg (12.9 st; 181 lb)

Rugby union career
- Position: Centre / Wing / Fullback
Senior career
Years	Team	Apps	(Points)
2019	Zimbabwe Academy	5	(0)
2022–	Zimbabwe Goshawks	1	(0)
- Correct as of 28 May 2022
International career
Years	Team	Apps	(Points)
2016	Zimbabwe U20	3	(8)
2018–	Zimbabwe	7	(15)
- Correct as of 28 May 2022
National sevens team
Years	Team		Comps
2018–	Zimbabwe Sevens		6
- Correct as of 28 May 2022

Shingirai Katsvere (born 10 May 1997) is a Zimbabwe rugby union player, currently playing for the Zimbabwe Goshawks in the 2022 Currie Cup First Division. His preferred position is centre, wing or fullback.

== Professional career ==
Katsvere represented Zimbabwe Academy in the 2019 Rugby Challenge. He was then named in the Zimbabwe Goshawks squad for the 2022 Currie Cup First Division. Katsvere is a Zimbabwean international in both 15-a-side and sevens.

Katsvere competed for Zimbabwe at the 2022 Rugby World Cup Sevens in Cape Town.
