= Federation of Lesotho Rugby =

Governing body for rugby union in Lesotho

First international
- Lesotho 6–3 Eswatini (Maseru, Lesotho; 22 February 2014)

Biggest win
- Lesotho 67–3 Malawi (Maseru, Lesotho; 21 October 2017)

Biggest defeat
- Lesotho 5–53 Botswana (Mbabane, Eswatini; 28 October 2026)

The Federation of Lesotho Rugby is the governing body for rugby union in Lesotho. The Federation of Lesotho Rugby became a full member of Rugby Africa in 2016 and an associate member of World Rugby in 2022. They have participated in the regional rugby sevens tournaments.

On 14 November 2024, Lesotho was granted World Rugby Full Member status by the World Rugby Council.

== Record ==
Below is a table of the representative rugby matches played by a Lesotho national XV at test level up until 28 October 2026, updated after match with Botswana.

Opponent	Played	Won	Lost	Drawn	% Won
Botswana	2	0	2	0	0%
Botswana A	1	0	1	0	0%
Burundi	1	1	0	0	100%
Eswatini	6	5	1	0	83.33%
Malawi	2	2	0	0	100%
Mauritius	1	0	1	0	0%
Rwanda	1	0	1	0	0%
Total	14	8	6	0	57.14%
