= Ivan Magomu =

Ugandan rugby union player

Ivan Magomu (born 6 September 1996) is a Ugandan rugby union player who plays as flyhalf for Black Pirates Rugby Club in the country's top tier Rugby Premier League and for the men's fifteens rugby national team, the Uganda national rugby union team, known as the Uganda Rugby Cranes. He is the captain of the Black Pirates Rugby Club, a role he has served since 2018. Ahead of the 2021 Rugby Africa Cup, Magomu was named Captain of the Uganda national rugby union team.

He has also played for the Uganda national rugby sevens team and featured at the Rugby World Cup Sevens 2018 in San Francisco, USA. and at the Commonwealth Games in Gold Coast, Australia (2018)

Magomu has been described as one of the best flyhalves Uganda has ever produced, and has been compared to 2007 Africa Cup champion Edmond Tumusiime who has since admitted that Magomu is miles better than he was.

== Professional career ==
Magomu holds a Bachelor of Laws degree from Uganda Christian University and a Post Graduate Diploma in Legal Practice (Bar Course) from Law Development Center. In 2021, he was appointed to the legal commission of the Uganda Olympic Committee.

He is also a Young & Emerging Leaders Project (YELP) fellow in the LeO Africa Institute Class of 2023.

Magomu currently serves as captain of the Uganda national rugby union team
