= Connor Pritchard =

Australian rugby union footballer

- Born: Connor Pritchard; 17 September 1996 (age 30) Brisbane, Australia
- Height: 180 cm (5 ft 11 in)
- Weight: 90 kg (200 lb; 14 st 2 lb)

Rugby union career
- Position: Flanker
Senior career
Years	Team	Apps	(Points)
2019–	Queensland Country	0	(0)
- Correct as of 29 August 2019
International career
Years	Team	Apps	(Points)
2016–	Zimbabwe	8	(10)
- Correct as of 29 August 2019

Connor Pritchard (born 17 September 1996 in Brisbane, Australia) is an, Australian born, Zimbabwean rugby union player who plays for the Queensland Country in the National Rugby Championship. His playing position is flanker. He was named in the Queensland Country squad for round 1 in 2019. He is also a Zimbabwean international.
