= Cwengile Jadezweni =

South African rugby union referee

- Full name: Cwengile Dumisani Thando Jadezweni
- Born: 2 October 1986 (age 40) Stellenbosch, South Africa
- Height: 1.84 m (6 ft 1/2 in)
- Weight: 80 kg (12 st 8 lb; 176 lb)

Rugby union career
Refereeing career
| Years | Competition | Apps |
| 2013–2015 | Vodacom Cup | 5 |
| 2015–present | Currie Cup | 9 |
| 2016 | World Rugby Under 20 Championship | 3 |
| 2016–present | Internationals | |

Cwengile Dumisani Thando 'JD' Jadezweni (born 2 October 1986 in Stellenbosch, South Africa) is a rugby referee on the National A Panel of the South African Rugby Union.

He also works as a rugby analyst at Sound Sure, along with fellow referee Marius van der Westhuizen.

== Career ==
Jadezweni attended Parel Vallei High School in Somerset West before returning to his town of birth to study sports science at the University of Stellenbosch. He played rugby for the Maties, but after shoulder and knee operations, decided to concentrate on refereeing, taking up the whistle in 2010 and joined the Western Province Referees' Society. He was named on South African Rugby Referees' Association's Contenders Panel in 2011 and to their National Panel in 2012.

He took charge of a number of matches in the 2012 Under-18 Craven Week tournament in Port Elizabeth, as well as some 2012 Under-19 Provincial Championship matches. He made his first class debut in 2013, when he was appointed the referee for the Leopards versus Griffons match in Potchefstroom during the 2013 Vodacom Cup, before again refereeing at youth level later in the year.

He took charge of some 2014 Varsity Cup and Varsity Shield matches and was appointed to co-referee the final with Marius van der Westhuizen. After refereeing more matches in the Vodacom Cup, Craven Week, Under-19 and Under-21 Provincial Championships and SARU Community Cup competition, he appeared in the Currie Cup for the first time in 2015; he was in charge of the SWD Eagles versus Falcons match in George in the Currie Cup and appeared in the Premier Division two weeks later in a match between the Pumas and Eastern Province Kings in Nelspruit.

Jadeweni was promoted to the South African Rugby Referees' Association's Elite Panel for 2016, before being named on the refereeing panel for the 2016 World Rugby Under 20 Championship held in England. He also made his test debut in August 2016, when he was appointed to take charge of a match between Kenya and Hong Kong in Nairobi.
