= Willy Ambaka =

Kenyan rugby union and sevens player

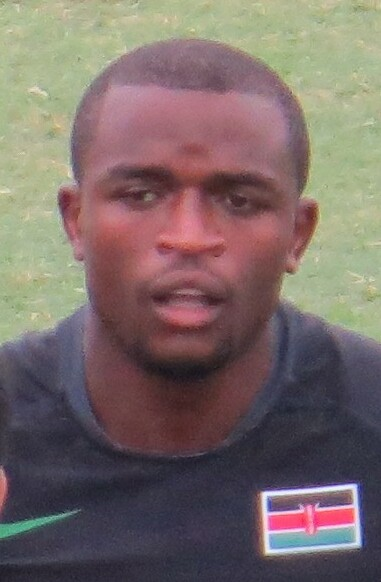
- Full name: William Ambaka Ndayara
- Born: 14 May 1990 (age 36) Wundanyi, Kenya
- Height: 1.94 m (6 ft 4 in)
- Weight: 100 kg (15 st 10 lb; 220 lb)
- School: Lubinu Boys High School

Rugby union career
- Position: Winger
Senior career
Years	Team	Apps	(Points)
2010–2013, 2015	Kenya Harlequins		
2013–2014	Lyon	10	(30)
2014–2015	Western Province	9	(0)
2017–2018	Manawatu	5	(5)
- Correct as of 16 October 2017
International career
Years	Team	Apps	(Points)
2011–2013, 2015–present	Kenya Sevens	30	(325)
- Correct as of 1 August 2014

William Ambaka Ndayara (born 14 May 1990) is a Kenyan rugby union player, currently playing for the Kenyan national sevens team as well as for Manawatu in New Zealand's Mitre 10 Cup. He has previously played professionally for French Rugby Pro D2 team, Lyon OU, and the South African Currie Cup side, Western Province. His regular position is winger.

== Early Career and Sevens Rugby ==
Ambaka started his rugby career for Kenya Harlequins in 2010. Harlequins' strength and conditioning coach, Geoffrey Kimani, recommended Ambaka to the Kenya Sevens head coach, Benjamin Ayimba. He made his debut for the national Kenya Sevens team at the 2011 Hong Kong Sevens tournament, and represented them during the 2011–12 and 2012–13 IRB Sevens World Series. Ambaka was chosen as part of the 2012–13 HSBC Sevens World Series Dream Team based on his performance that season. He was one of three nominations for the IRB Sevens Player of the Year award in 2013, but lost out to Tim Mikkelson of New Zealand. He also played for the Kenya Sevens at the 2013 Rugby World Cup Sevens in Moscow.

Ambaka was also included in the Kenya national team squad that played in the 2014 Africa Cup competition (which doubled up as a 2015 Rugby World Cup qualifying tournament), but had to withdraw after suffering an ankle injury.

In 2022, He featured for Kenya at the Rugby World Cup Sevens in Cape Town.

== Lyon ==
In 2013, Ambaka signed a professional contract with Lyon for the 2013–14 Rugby Pro D2 season, becoming the first Kenyan rugby player to play for a team in the top two divisions in France. He played in ten matches and scored six tries as Lyon won the title and promotion to the Top 14 for 2014–15.

== Western Province ==
On 31 July 2014, South African Currie Cup side Western Province announced that Ambaka would join them ahead of the 2014 Currie Cup Premier Division season. He was signed on the recommendation of Jerome Paarwater, the coach of the Kenya national team and former coach of Western Province.

However, shortly after arriving in Cape Town, he suffered an ankle injury and made no appearances for the team during their title-winning season.
