= Oscar Ouma Achieng =

Kenyan rugby union player

Oscar Ouma
- Full name: Oscar Ouma Achieng
- Born: May 3, 1989 (age 37) Kijabe, Kenya
- Height: 1.86 m (6 ft 1 in)
- Weight: 105 kg (231 lb)

Rugby union career
National sevens team
Years	Team	Comps
- Kenya

Oscar Ouma Achieng (born 3 May 1989) is a Kenyan rugby sevens player. He was selected for the Kenya 7sn squad for the 2016 Summer Olympics. He was named in Kenya 7s's squad for the 2014 Commonwealth Games in Glasgow, Scotland. He was also in the 2013 Rugby World Cup Sevens squad for Kenya 7s.

He formerly played for Kandy S.C in Sri Lanka.
