= Shayne Makombe =

Zimbabwean rugby union player (born 1991)

- Born: 21 November 1991 (age 34) Harare, Zimbabwe
- Height: 1.79 m (5 ft 10 1/2 in)
- Weight: 95 kg (15.0 st; 209 lb)
- School: Churchill Boys High School
- University: University of KwaZulu-Natal

Rugby union career
- Position: Wing
Senior career
Years	Team	Apps	(Points)
2021–2022	Saint-Denis	10	(0)
2022–	Zimbabwe Goshawks	0	(0)
- Correct as of 3 April 2022
International career
Years	Team	Apps	(Points)
2018–	Zimbabwe	32	(40)
- Correct as of 3 April 2022
National sevens team
Years	Team		Comps
2014–	Zimbabwe Sevens		5
- Correct as of 3 April 2022

Shayne Makombe (born 21 November 1991) is a Zimbabwe rugby union player for the Zimbabwe Goshawks in the 2022 Currie Cup First Division. His preferred position is wing.

== Professional career ==
Makombe was named in the Zimbabwe Goshawks squad for the 2022 Currie Cup First Division. He is a Zimbabwean international in both 15-a-side and sevens.
