= 2002 Santiago Sevens =

- IRB Sevens III
- Host nation: Chile
- Date: 4–5 January 2002

Cup
- Champion: New Zealand
- Runner-up: Argentina

Plate
- Winner: Samoa
- Runner-up: England

Bowl
- Winner: United States
- Runner-up: Canada

Shield
- Winner: Uruguay
- Runner-up: Chile

Tournament details
- Matches played: 41

The 2001 Santiago Sevens was a rugby sevens tournament held at the Estadio San Carlos de Apoquindo in Santiago. The tournament took place from 4–5 January 2002 and was the first edition of the Santiago Sevens and was also the second leg of the 2001–02 World Sevens Series.

Sixteen teams was separated into four groups of four with the top two teams qualifying through to the cup final while the bottom two competed in the bowl. After finishing top of their group, New Zealand went on to be champions title after defeating first-time cup finalists Argentina 21–7. In the plate final, Samoa defeated England 21–12. In the bowl final United States defeated Canada 32–5. In the shield final Uruguay defeated Chile 19–10.

== Format ==
The teams were drawn into four pools of four teams each. Each team played the other teams in their pool once, with 3 points awarded for a win, 2 points for a draw, and 1 point for a loss (no points awarded for a forfeit). The pool stage was played on the first day of the tournament. The top two teams from each pool advanced to the Cup/Plate brackets. The bottom two teams from each pool went on to the Bowl bracket.

== Teams ==
The participating teams were:

- Argentina
- Australia
- Brazil
- Canada
- Chile
- England
- Fiji
- France
- New Zealand
- Paraguay
- Samoa
- South Africa
- Uruguay
- United States
- Wales
- West Indies

== Pool stage ==
The pool stage was played on the first day of the tournament. The 16 teams were separated into four pools of four teams and teams in the same pool played each other once. The top two teams in each pool advanced to the Cup quarterfinals to compete for the 2002 Santiago Sevens title.

Key to colours in group tables
Teams that advanced to the Cup quarterfinals
Teams that advanced to the Bowl quarterfinals

=== Pool A ===
Pos	Team	Pld	W	D	L	PF	PA	PD	Pts
1	New Zealand	3	3	0	0	131	0	+131	9
2	Wales	3	2	0	1	48	48	0	7
3	Canada	3	1	0	2	93	52	+41	5
4	Paraguay	3	0	0	3	7	0	+7	3

4 January 2002

New Zealand	31–12	Wales

Estadio San Carlos de Apoquindo, Santiago

4 January 2002

Canada	73–0	Paraguay

Estadio San Carlos de Apoquindo, Santiago

4 January 2002

Wales	19–10	Canada

Estadio San Carlos de Apoquindo, Santiago

4 January 2002

New Zealand	64–0	Paraguay

Estadio San Carlos de Apoquindo, Santiago

4 January 2002

Wales	17–7	Paraguay

Estadio San Carlos de Apoquindo, Santiago

4 January 2002

New Zealand	33–10	Canada

Estadio San Carlos de Apoquindo, Santiago

=== Pool B ===
Pos	Team	Pld	W	D	L	PF	PA	PD	Pts
1	Argentina	3	3	0	0	105	12	+93	9
2	Australia	3	2	0	1	99	15	+84	7
3	United States	3	1	0	2	69	74	−5	5
4	Brazil	3	0	0	3	7	179	−172	3

4 January 2002

Argentina	10–0	Australia

Estadio San Carlos de Apoquindo, Santiago

4 January 2002

United States	59–0	Brazil

Estadio San Carlos de Apoquindo, Santiago

4 January 2002

Argentina	41–5	United States

Estadio San Carlos de Apoquindo, Santiago

4 January 2002

Australia	66–0	Brazil

Estadio San Carlos de Apoquindo, Santiago

4 January 2002

Argentina	54–7	Brazil

Estadio San Carlos de Apoquindo, Santiago

4 January 2002

Australia	33–5	United States

Estadio San Carlos de Apoquindo, Santiago

=== Pool C ===
Pos	Team	Pld	W	D	L	PF	PA	PD	Pts
1	South Africa	3	2	0	1	83	19	+64	7
2	England	3	2	0	1	81	24	+57	7
3	France	3	1	0	2	57	53	+4	5
4	Uruguay	3	0	0	3	12	137	−125	3

4 January 2002

England	12–7	South Africa

Estadio San Carlos de Apoquindo, Santiago

4 January 2002

France	33–12	Uruguay

Estadio San Carlos de Apoquindo, Santiago

4 January 2002

France	17–15	England

Estadio San Carlos de Apoquindo, Santiago

4 January 2002

South Africa	50–0	Uruguay

Estadio San Carlos de Apoquindo, Santiago

4 January 2002

England	54–0	Uruguay

Estadio San Carlos de Apoquindo, Santiago

4 January 2002

South Africa	26–7	France

Estadio San Carlos de Apoquindo, Santiago

=== Pool D ===
Pos	Team	Pld	W	D	L	PF	PA	PD	Pts
1	Fiji	3	3	0	0	159	5	+154	9
2	Samoa	3	2	0	1	81	33	+48	7
3	West Indies	3	1	0	2	26	117	−91	5
4	Chile	3	0	0	3	24	135	−111	3

4 January 2002

Fiji	26–0	Samoa

Estadio San Carlos de Apoquindo, Santiago

4 January 2002

West Indies	21–17	Chile

Estadio San Carlos de Apoquindo, Santiago

4 January 2002

Fiji	76–0	Chile

Estadio San Carlos de Apoquindo, Santiago

4 January 2002

Samoa	43–0	West Indies

Estadio San Carlos de Apoquindo, Santiago

4 January 2002

Fiji	57–5	West Indies

Estadio San Carlos de Apoquindo, Santiago

4 January 2002

Samoa	38–7	Chile

Estadio San Carlos de Apoquindo, Santiago

== Knockout stage ==
=== Shield ===
Semi-finals
5 January 2002 – Estadio San Carlos de Apoquindo
Uruguay	31
Brazil	5
5 January 2002 – Estadio San Carlos de Apoquindo
Paraguay	0
Chile	43

Final
5 January 2002 – Estadio San Carlos de Apoquindo
Uruguay	19
Chile	10

=== Bowl ===
Quarter-finals
5 January 2002 – Estadio San Carlos de Apoquindo
Canada	24
Brazil	10
5 January 2002 – Estadio San Carlos de Apoquindo
West Indies	24
Uruguay	19
5 January 2002 – Estadio San Carlos de Apoquindo
United States	45
Paraguay	7
5 January 2002 – Estadio San Carlos de Apoquindo
France	22
Chile	7

Semi-finals
5 January 2002 – Estadio San Carlos de Apoquindo
Canada	24
West Indies	10
5 January 2002 – Estadio San Carlos de Apoquindo
United States	33
France	26

Final
5 January 2002 – Estadio San Carlos de Apoquindo
Canada	5
United States	32

=== Plate ===
Semi-finals
5 January 2002 – Estadio San Carlos de Apoquindo
Australia	17
England	15
5 January 2002 – Estadio San Carlos de Apoquindo
Wales	0
Samoa	35

Final
5 January 2002 – Estadio San Carlos de Apoquindo
England	12
Samoa	21

=== Cup ===
Quarter-finals
5 January 2002 – Estadio San Carlos de Apoquindo
New Zealand	21
Australia	5
5 January 2002 – Estadio San Carlos de Apoquindo
Fiji	36
England	7
5 January 2002 – Estadio San Carlos de Apoquindo
Argentina	39
Wales	19
5 January 2002 – Estadio San Carlos de Apoquindo
South Africa	28
Samoa	14

Semi-finals
5 January 2002 – Estadio San Carlos de Apoquindo
New Zealand	19
Fiji	17
5 January 2002 – Estadio San Carlos de Apoquindo
Argentina	14
South Africa	7

Final
5 January 2002 – Estadio San Carlos de Apoquindo
New Zealand	21
Argentina	7

== Tournament placings ==
Place	Team	Points
1st place, gold medalist(s)	New Zealand	20
2nd place, silver medalist(s)	Argentina	16
3rd place, bronze medalist(s)	South Africa	12
3rd place, bronze medalist(s)	Fiji	12
5	Samoa	8
6	England	6
7	Australia	4
7	Wales	4

Place	Team	Points
9	United States	2
10	Canada	0
11	France	0
11	West Indies	0
13	Uruguay	0
14	Chile	0
15	Brazil	0
15	Paraguay	0

Source: Rugby7.com

IRB Sevens III
Preceded by 2001 South Africa Sevens	2002 Santiago Sevens Sevens	Succeeded by 2002 Mar del Plata Sevens
Santiago Sevens
Preceded by None	2002 Santiago Sevens	Succeeded by None
