= 2002 Brisbane Sevens =

- IRB Sevens III
- Host nation: Australia
- Date: 2–3 March 2002

Cup
- Champion: Australia
- Runner-up: New Zealand

Plate
- Winner: Fiji
- Runner-up: Argentina

Bowl
- Winner: Cook Islands
- Runner-up: Japan

Shield
- Winner: Canada
- Runner-up: Tonga

Tournament details
- Matches played: 44

The 2002 Brisbane Sevens, officially called the 2002 Brisbane International Sevens, was an international rugby sevens tournament that was part of the World Sevens Series in the 2001–02 season. It was the Australian Sevens leg of the series, held at Ballymore Stadium in Brisbane over the weekend of the 2 and 3 March 2002.

The tournament was the second completed edition of the Australian Sevens, and was won by Australia who defeated New Zealand 28-0 in the Cup final.

== Format ==
The teams were drawn into four pools of four teams each. Each team played the other teams in their pool once, with 3 points awarded for a win, 2 points for a draw, and 1 point for a loss (no points awarded for a forfeit). The top two teams from each pool advanced to the Cup/Plate brackets. The bottom two teams from each group went on to the Bowl/Shield brackets.

== Teams ==
The participating teams were:

- Argentina
- Australia
- Canada
- China
- Cook Islands
- England
- Fiji
- France
- Japan
- New Zealand
- Papua New Guinea
- Samoa
- South Africa
- Tonga
- United States
- Wales

== Pool Stage ==
Play on the first day of the tournament consisted of matches between teams in the same pool on a round robin basis. The following is a list of the recorded results.

Key to colours in group tables
Teams that advanced to the Cup quarterfinals
Teams that advanced to the Bowl quarterfinals

=== Pool A ===
Pos	Team	Pld	W	D	L	PF	PA	PD	Pts
1	New Zealand	3	3	0	0	98	15	+83	9
2	Samoa	3	2	0	1	76	29	+47	7
3	Japan	3	1	0	2	31	77	−46	5
4	France	3	0	0	3	10	94	−84	3

2 March 2002

New Zealand	12–10	Samoa

Ballymore Stadium, Brisbane

2 March 2002

Japan	19–0	France

Ballymore Stadium, Brisbane

2 March 2002

Samoa	28–10	France

Ballymore Stadium, Brisbane

2 March 2002

New Zealand	39–5	Japan

Ballymore Stadium, Brisbane

2 March 2002

Samoa	38–7	Japan

Ballymore Stadium, Brisbane

2 March 2002

New Zealand	47–0	France

Ballymore Stadium, Brisbane

=== Pool B ===
Pos	Team	Pld	W	D	L	PF	PA	PD	Pts
1	Fiji	3	3	0	0	123	10	+113	9
2	Argentina	3	2	0	1	73	41	+32	7
3	Cook Islands	3	1	0	2	45	79	−34	5
4	China	3	0	0	3	17	128	−111	3

2 March 2002

Fiji	29–5	Argentina

Ballymore Stadium, Brisbane

2 March 2002

Cook Islands	38–7	China

Ballymore Stadium, Brisbane

2 March 2002

Argentina	27–7	Cook Islands

Ballymore Stadium, Brisbane

2 March 2002

Fiji	49–5	China

Ballymore Stadium, Brisbane

2 March 2002

Argentina	41–5	China

Ballymore Stadium, Brisbane

2 March 2002

Fiji	45–0	Cook Islands

Ballymore Stadium, Brisbane

=== Pool C ===
Pos	Team	Pld	W	D	L	PF	PA	PD	Pts
1	Australia	3	3	0	0	127	0	+127	9
2	United States	3	2	0	1	57	80	−23	7
3	Papua New Guinea	3	1	0	2	45	83	−38	5
4	Wales	3	0	0	3	31	97	−66	3

2 March 2002

United States	33–14	Wales

Ballymore Stadium, Brisbane

2 March 2002

Australia	29–0	Wales

Ballymore Stadium, Brisbane

2 March 2002

United States	24–10	Papua New Guinea

Ballymore Stadium, Brisbane

2 March 2002

Australia	42–0	Papua New Guinea

Ballymore Stadium, Brisbane

2 March 2002

Papua New Guinea	35–17	Wales

Ballymore Stadium, Brisbane

2 March 2002

Australia	56–0	United States

Ballymore Stadium, Brisbane

=== Pool D ===
Pos	Team	Pld	W	D	L	PF	PA	PD	Pts
1	South Africa	3	3	0	0	83	15	+68	9
2	England	3	2	0	1	67	17	+50	7
3	Canada	3	1	0	2	24	83	−59	5
4	Tonga	3	0	0	3	19	78	−59	3

2 March 2002

South Africa	17–5	England

Ballymore Stadium, Brisbane

2 March 2002

Canada	19–14	Tonga

Ballymore Stadium, Brisbane

2 March 2002

England	29–0	Canada

Ballymore Stadium, Brisbane

2 March 2002

South Africa	26–5	Tonga

Ballymore Stadium, Brisbane

2 March 2002

England	33–0	Tonga

Ballymore Stadium, Brisbane

2 March 2002

South Africa	40–5	Canada

Ballymore Stadium, Brisbane

== Knockout stage ==
Play on the second day of the tournament consisted of finals matches for the Shield, Bowl, Plate, and Cup competitions. The following is a list of the recorded results.

=== Shield ===
Semi-finals
3 March – Ballymore Stadium
France	12
Tonga	26
3 March – Ballymore Stadium
Canada	31
China	14

Final
3 March – Ballymore Stadium
Canada	38
Tonga	7

=== Bowl ===
Quarter-finals
3 March – Ballymore Stadium
Cook Islands	12
France	10
3 March – Ballymore Stadium
Papua New Guinea	14
Tonga	10
3 March – Ballymore Stadium
Canada	10
Wales	17
3 March – Ballymore Stadium
Japan	26
China	19

Semi-finals
3 March – Ballymore Stadium
Cook Islands	19
Papua New Guinea	14
3 March – Ballymore Stadium
Wales	7
Japan	10

Final
3 March – Ballymore Stadium
Cook Islands	36
Japan	7

=== Plate ===
Semi-finals
3 March – Ballymore Stadium
Fiji	17
England	12
3 March – Ballymore Stadium
United States	7
Argentina	36

Final
3 March – Ballymore Stadium
Fiji	12
Argentina	5

=== Cup ===
Quarter-finals
3 March – Ballymore Stadium
Fiji	5
Samoa	19
3 March – Ballymore Stadium
Australia	29
England	12
3 March – Ballymore Stadium
South Africa	25
United States	0
3 March – Ballymore Stadium
New Zealand	24
Argentina	10

Semi-finals
3 March – Ballymore Stadium
Samoa	5
Australia	29
3 March – Ballymore Stadium
South Africa	12
New Zealand	14

Final
3 March – Ballymore Stadium
Australia	28
New Zealand	0

== Tournament placings ==
Place	Team	Points
1st place, gold medalist(s)	Australia	20
2nd place, silver medalist(s)	New Zealand	16
3rd place, bronze medalist(s)	South Africa	12
3rd place, bronze medalist(s)	Samoa	12
5	Fiji	8
6	Argentina	6
7	England	4
7	United States	4

Place	Team	Points
9	Cook Islands	2
10	Japan	0
11	Wales	0
11	Papua New Guinea	0
13	Canada	0
14	Tonga	0
15	France	0
15	China	0

IRB Sevens III
Preceded by 2002 Mar del Plata Sevens	2002 Brisbane Sevens	Succeeded by 2002 Wellington Sevens
Australian Sevens
Preceded by 2000 Brisbane Sevens (2001 event cancelled)	2002 Brisbane Sevens	Succeeded by 2003 Brisbane Sevens
