= SVNS 3 =

Annual series of international rugby sevens tournaments

- Current seasons
- ^{2027 Men's Series}_{2027 Women's Series}
- Sport: Rugby sevens
- First season: 2026; 0 years ago
- No. of teams: 8 (men's); 8 (women's)
- Most recent champions: Canada (2026 Men); South Africa (2026 Women)
- Most titles: Men; Canada (1 title); Women; South Africa (1 title)
- Level on pyramid: 3
- Promotion to: SVNS 2

The SVNS 3 (officially the HSBC SVNS 3) is an annual series of rugby sevens tournaments for national teams run by World Rugby that includes men's and women's events. Sponsored by banking group HSBC, it is the third tier of competition below the SVNS 2 and SVNS. Teams on the respective men's and women's tours of the series compete for promotion to the second tier where they can compete for promotion to the first tier.

The inaugural SVNS 3 in 2026 will be a single tournament in Dubai. The top two teams will earn promotion to the SVNS 2, where the top four sides will earn promotion to the SVNS World Championship.

== Historical results ==
=== Results by season – Men ===
Summary of the top six placegetters for each series:

Series	Season	Rds	Champion	Second	Third	Fourth	Fifth	Sixth	Ref
I	2026	1	Canada	Belgium	Samoa	Hong Kong	Madagascar	Italy	
II	2027	2							

=== Results by season – Women ===
Summary of the top six placegetters for each series:

Series	Season	Rds	Champion	Second	Third	Fourth	Fifth	Sixth	Ref
I	2026	1	South Africa	Argentina	Czech Republic	Poland	Colombia	Thailand	
II	2027	2							

=== Men's ===
Team	(United Arab Emirates) 2026	(United Arab Emirates) 2027	Years
Canada	1st	Q	1
Chile	–	Q	1
Colombia	7th	–	1
Belgium	2nd	–	1
Hong Kong	4th	Q	2
Italy	6th	Q	2
Madagascar	5th	–	1
Samoa	3rd	Q	2
Tonga	8th	–	1
Zimbabwe	–	Q	1
Total	8	6	

=== Women's ===
Team	(United Arab Emirates) 2026	(United Arab Emirates) 2027	Years
Argentina	2nd	–	1
Colombia	5th	Q	2
China	–	Q	1
Czech Republic	3rd	–	1
Mexico	8th	Q	2
Poland	4th	Q	2
Samoa	7th	Q	2
South Africa	1st	–	1
Thailand	6th	–	1
Uganda	–	Q	1
Total	8	6	
