= 2002 Hong Kong Sevens =

International rugby sevens tournament

- IRB Sevens III
- Host nation: Hong Kong
- Date: 22–24 March 2002

Cup
- Champion: England
- Runner-up: Fiji

Plate
- Winner: South Africa
- Runner-up: Scotland

Bowl
- Winner: Morocco
- Runner-up: Chinese Taipei

Tournament details
- Matches played: 45

The 2002 Hong Kong Sevens was an international rugby sevens tournament that took place at the Hong Kong Stadium between 22 and 24 March 2002. It was the 27th edition of the Hong Kong Sevens and was the seventh tournament of the 2001–02 World Sevens Series. Twenty-four teams competed in the tournament and were separated into six groups of four with the top eight teams qualifying through to the cup tournament.

After winning their three group matches, England went on to win their first Hong Kong title defeating Fiji in the final by a score of 33–20. In the plate-final, South Africa defeated Scotland while Morocco took home the bowl defeating Chinese Taipei.

== Teams ==
Compared to other tournament of the series, the Hong Kong Sevens had 24 teams compete for the title instead of the regular sixteen teams that usually competed in a World Series event. The official announcement of teams was revealed on the 22 January 2002. Almost a month later, Italy withdrew from the Hong Kong Sevens and was replaced by Thailand.

- Argentina
- Australia
- Canada
- China
- Chinese Taipei
- England
- Fiji
- France
- Hong Kong
- Japan
- Morocco
- New Zealand
- Papua New Guinea
- Portugal
- Russia
- Samoa
- Scotland
- Singapore
- South Africa
- South Korea
- Sri Lanka
- Thailand
- United States
- Wales

== Format ==
The teams were drawn into six pools of four teams each. Each team played the other teams in their pool once, with three points awarded for a win, two points for a draw, and one point for a loss (no points awarded for a forfeit). The pool stage was played over the first two days of the tournament. The top team from each pool along with the two best runners-up advanced to the Cup quarter finals. The remaining four runners-up along with the four best third-placed teams advanced to the Plate quarter finals. The remaining eight teams went on to the Bowl quarter finals.

== Pool stage ==
Key to colours in group tables
| Teams that advanced to the Cup quarterfinals |
| Teams that advanced to the Plate quarterfinals |
| Teams that advanced to the Bowl quarterfinals |

=== Pool A ===
| Pos | Team | Pld | W | D | L | PF | PA | PD | Pts |
|---|---|---|---|---|---|---|---|---|---|
| 1 | New Zealand | 3 | 3 | 0 | 0 | 136 | 7 | +129 | 9 |
| 2 | Portugal | 3 | 2 | 0 | 1 | 59 | 68 | −9 | 7 |
| 3 | Scotland | 3 | 1 | 0 | 2 | 40 | 67 | −27 | 5 |
| 4 | Sri Lanka | 3 | 0 | 0 | 3 | 10 | 103 | −93 | 3 |

Source: HK Sevens

22 March
17:00

| New Zealand | 51–0 | Sri Lanka |

Hong Kong Stadium, Hong Kong

22 March
19:12

| Portugal | 26–14 | Scotland |

Hong Kong Stadium, Hong Kong

23 March
10:46

| Scotland | 19–10 | Sri Lanka |

Hong Kong Stadium, Hong Kong

23 March
12:58

| New Zealand | 54–0 | Portugal |

Hong Kong Stadium, Hong Kong

23 March
15:10

| Portugal | 33–0 | Sri Lanka |

Hong Kong Stadium, Hong Kong

23 March
17:22

| New Zealand | 31–7 | Scotland |

Hong Kong Stadium, Hong Kong

Source: HK Sevens

=== Pool B ===
| Pos | Team | Pld | W | D | L | PF | PA | PD | Pts |
|---|---|---|---|---|---|---|---|---|---|
| 1 | Canada | 3 | 3 | 0 | 0 | 65 | 19 | +46 | 9 |
| 2 | South Africa | 3 | 2 | 0 | 1 | 82 | 38 | +44 | 7 |
| 3 | Papua New Guinea | 3 | 1 | 0 | 2 | 28 | 72 | −44 | 5 |
| 4 | Chinese Taipei | 3 | 0 | 0 | 3 | 31 | 77 | −46 | 3 |

Source: HK Sevens

22 March
17:22

| South Africa | 44–12 | Chinese Taipei |

Hong Kong Stadium, Hong Kong

22 March
19:34

| Canada | 34–0 | Papua New Guinea |

Hong Kong Stadium, Hong Kong

23 March
11:08

| Canada | 12–5 | Chinese Taipei |

Hong Kong Stadium, Hong Kong

23 March
13:20

| South Africa | 24–7 | Papua New Guinea |

Hong Kong Stadium, Hong Kong

23 March
15:32

| Papua New Guinea | 21–14 | Chinese Taipei |

Hong Kong Stadium, Hong Kong

23 March
17:44

| Canada | 19–14 | South Africa |

Hong Kong Stadium, Hong Kong

Source: HK Sevens

=== Pool C ===
| Pos | Team | Pld | W | D | L | PF | PA | PD | Pts |
|---|---|---|---|---|---|---|---|---|---|
| 1 | Samoa | 3 | 3 | 0 | 0 | 80 | 12 | +68 | 9 |
| 2 | United States | 3 | 2 | 0 | 1 | 59 | 43 | +16 | 7 |
| 3 | Hong Kong | 3 | 1 | 0 | 2 | 33 | 56 | −23 | 5 |
| 4 | Russia | 3 | 0 | 0 | 3 | 5 | 66 | −61 | 3 |

Source: HK Sevens

22 March
17:44

| Samoa | 28–7 | Hong Kong |

Hong Kong Stadium, Hong Kong

22 March
19:56

| United States | 26–5 | Russia |

Hong Kong Stadium, Hong Kong

23 March
11:30

| United States | 28–19 | Hong Kong |

Hong Kong Stadium, Hong Kong

23 March
13:42

| Samoa | 33–0 | Russia |

Hong Kong Stadium, Hong Kong

23 March
15:54

| Hong Kong | 7–0 | Russia |

Hong Kong Stadium, Hong Kong

23 March
18:06

| Samoa | 19–5 | United States |

Hong Kong Stadium, Hong Kong

Source: HK Sevens

=== Pool D ===
| Pos | Team | Pld | W | D | L | PF | PA | PD | Pts |
|---|---|---|---|---|---|---|---|---|---|
| 1 | Australia | 3 | 3 | 0 | 0 | 86 | 7 | +79 | 9 |
| 2 | France | 3 | 2 | 0 | 1 | 33 | 48 | −15 | 7 |
| 3 | South Korea | 3 | 1 | 0 | 2 | 41 | 64 | −23 | 5 |
| 4 | Morocco | 3 | 0 | 0 | 3 | 24 | 65 | −41 | 3 |

Source: HK Sevens

22 March
18:06

| Australia | 31–7 | Morocco |

Hong Kong Stadium, Hong Kong

22 March
20:18

| France | 21–19 | South Korea |

Hong Kong Stadium, Hong Kong

23 March
11:52

| France | 12–7 | Morocco |

Hong Kong Stadium, Hong Kong

23 March
14:04

| Australia | 33–0 | South Korea |

Hong Kong Stadium, Hong Kong

23 March
16:16

| South Korea | 22–10 | Morocco |

Hong Kong Stadium, Hong Kong

23 March
18:28

| Australia | 22–0 | France |

Hong Kong Stadium, Hong Kong

Source: HK Sevens

=== Pool E ===
| Pos | Team | Pld | W | D | L | PF | PA | PD | Pts |
|---|---|---|---|---|---|---|---|---|---|
| 1 | Fiji | 3 | 3 | 0 | 0 | 138 | 0 | +138 | 9 |
| 2 | Wales | 3 | 2 | 0 | 1 | 85 | 24 | +61 | 7 |
| 3 | China | 3 | 1 | 0 | 2 | 34 | 129 | −95 | 5 |
| 4 | Singapore | 3 | 0 | 0 | 3 | 14 | 118 | −104 | 3 |

Source: HK Sevens

22 March
18:28

| Fiji | 55–0 | Singapore |

Hong Kong Stadium, Hong Kong

22 March
20:40

| Wales | 56–0 | China |

Hong Kong Stadium, Hong Kong

23 March
12:14

| Wales | 29–7 | Singapore |

Hong Kong Stadium, Hong Kong

23 March
14:26

| Fiji | 66–0 | China |

Hong Kong Stadium, Hong Kong

23 March
16:38

| China | 34–7 | Singapore |

Hong Kong Stadium, Hong Kong

23 March
18:50

| Fiji | 17–0 | Wales |

Hong Kong Stadium, Hong Kong

Source: HK Sevens

=== Pool F ===
| Pos | Team | Pld | W | D | L | PF | PA | PD | Pts |
|---|---|---|---|---|---|---|---|---|---|
| 1 | England | 3 | 3 | 0 | 0 | 99 | 10 | +89 | 9 |
| 2 | Argentina | 3 | 2 | 0 | 1 | 87 | 29 | +58 | 7 |
| 3 | Japan | 3 | 1 | 0 | 2 | 38 | 90 | −52 | 5 |
| 4 | Thailand | 3 | 0 | 0 | 3 | 20 | 115 | −95 | 3 |

Source: HK Sevens

22 March
18:50

| Argentina | 49–5 | Thailand |

Hong Kong Stadium, Hong Kong

22 March
21:02

| England | 47–0 | Japan |

Hong Kong Stadium, Hong Kong

23 March
12:36

| England | 33–5 | Thailand |

Hong Kong Stadium, Hong Kong

23 March
14:48

| Argentina | 33–5 | Japan |

Hong Kong Stadium, Hong Kong

23 March
17:00

| Japan | 33–10 | Thailand |

Hong Kong Stadium, Hong Kong

23 March
19:12

| England | 19–5 | Argentina |

Hong Kong Stadium, Hong Kong

Source: HK Sevens

== Knockout stage ==
=== Bowl ===
Quarter-finals
24 March – Hong Kong Stadium
China | 38
Thailand | 17
24 March – Hong Kong Stadium
Morocco | 14
Sri Lanka | 5
24 March – Hong Kong Stadium
Chinese Taipei | 10
Russia | 5
24 March – Hong Kong Stadium
Singapore | 19
Japan | 17

Semi-finals
24 March – Hong Kong Stadium
China | 5
Morocco | 33
24 March – Hong Kong Stadium
Chinese Taipei | 41
Singapore | 0

Final
24 March – Hong Kong Stadium
Morocco | 15
Chinese Taipei | 12

Source: Rugby7

=== Plate ===
Quarter-finals
24 March – Hong Kong Stadium
United States | 34
Hong Kong | 12
24 March – Hong Kong Stadium
Scotland | 12
Portugal | 7
24 March – Hong Kong Stadium
France | 28
South Korea | 26
24 March – Hong Kong Stadium
South Africa | 40
Papua New Guinea | 0

Semi-finals
24 March – Hong Kong Stadium
United States | 10
Scotland | 14
24 March – Hong Kong Stadium
France | 5
South Africa | 26

Final
24 March – Hong Kong Stadium
Scotland | 7
South Africa | 48

Source: Rugby7

=== Cup ===
Quarter-finals
24 March – Hong Kong Stadium
Wales | 21
Canada | 0
24 March – Hong Kong Stadium
England | 19
Samoa | 5
24 March – Hong Kong Stadium
Fiji | 33
Australia | 17
24 March – Hong Kong Stadium
New Zealand | 24
Argentina | 0

Semi-finals
24 March – Hong Kong Stadium
Wales | 12
England | 19
24 March – Hong Kong Stadium
Fiji | 10
New Zealand | 7

Final
24 March – Hong Kong Stadium
England | 33
Fiji | 20

Source: Rugby7

== Tournament placings ==
| Place | Team | Points |
|---|---|---|
| 1st place, gold medalist(s) | England | 30 |
| 2nd place, silver medalist(s) | Fiji | 24 |
| 3rd place, bronze medalist(s) | New Zealand | 18 |
| 3rd place, bronze medalist(s) | Wales | 18 |
| 5 | Argentina | 8 |
| 5 | Australia | 8 |
| 5 | Canada | 8 |
| 5 | Samoa | 8 |
| 9 | South Africa | 4 |
| 10 | Scotland | 3 |
| 11 | France | 2 |
| 11 | United States | 2 |

| Place | Team | Points |
|---|---|---|
| 13 | Hong Kong | 0 |
| 13 | Papua New Guinea | 0 |
| 13 | Portugal | 0 |
| 13 | South Korea | 0 |
| 17 | Morocco | 1 |
| 18 | Chinese Taipei | 0 |
| 19 | China | 0 |
| 19 | Singapore | 0 |
| 21 | Japan | 0 |
| 21 | Russia | 0 |
| 21 | Sri Lanka | 0 |
| 21 | Thailand | 0 |

Source: Rugby7.com

IRB Sevens III
| Preceded by 2002 Beijing Sevens | 2002 Hong Kong Sevens | Succeeded by 2002 Singapore Sevens |
Hong Kong Sevens
| Preceded by 2001 Hong Kong Sevens | 2002 Hong Kong Sevens | Succeeded by 2003 Hong Kong Sevens |
