= 2026 SVNS 3 – Men's tour =

Rugby sevens competition

2026 SVNS 3
- Men's tour – Series I
- Hosts: United Arab Emirates
- Date: 17–18 January 2026
- Nations: 8

Final positions
- Champions: Canada
- Runners-up: Belgium
- Third: Samoa

Series details
- Top try scorer: Lolesio Sailosi (6); Warren Solomona (6)
- Top point scorer: Lolesio Sailosi (52)

The 2026 SVNS 3 – Men's tour is the first season of the third-tier global rugby sevens competition for men's national teams.

== Teams and venue ==
There are eight men's national teams competing in the 2026 SVNS 3.

| Date qualified | Means of qualification | Nation |
|---|---|---|
| 25 May 2025 | 2025 Sudamérica Rugby Sevens | Colombia |
| 29 June 2025 | 2025 Rugby Europe Sevens Championship Series | Belgium |
| 29 June 2025 | 2025 Rugby Europe Sevens Championship Series | Italy |
| 23 November 2025 | 2025 RAN Sevens | Canada |
| 22 June 2025 | 2025 Africa Men's Sevens | Madagascar |
| 19 October 2025 | 2025 Asia Rugby Sevens Series | Hong Kong |
| 8 December 2024 | 2024 Oceania Sevens Championship | Samoa |
| 8 December 2024 | 2024 Oceania Sevens Championship | Tonga |
| Totals | 6 | 8 |

Venue
| Country | Location | Stadium |
|---|---|---|
| UAE | Dubai | The Sevens Stadium |

== Pool stage ==
=== Pool A ===
| Pos | Team | Pld | W | L | PF | PA | PD | Pts |
|---|---|---|---|---|---|---|---|---|
| 1 | Samoa | 3 | 3 | 0 | 89 | 36 | +55 | 9 |
| 2 | Hong Kong | 3 | 2 | 1 | 88 | 36 | +33 | 6 |
| 3 | Tonga | 3 | 1 | 2 | 45 | 79 | −34 | 3 |
| 4 | Colombia | 3 | 0 | 3 | 29 | 83 | -54 | 1 |

17 January
12:12

| Tonga | 14–33 | Hong Kong |

The Sevens Stadium, Dubai

17 January
12:34

| Samoa | 26–7 | Colombia |

The Sevens Stadium, Dubai

17 January
15:28

| Tonga | 19–12 | Colombia |

The Sevens Stadium, Dubai

17 January
15:50

| Samoa | 31–17 | Hong Kong |

The Sevens Stadium, Dubai

17 January
18:44

| Hong Kong | 38–10 | Colombia |

The Sevens Stadium, Dubai

17 January
19:06

| Samoa | 34–12 | Tonga |

The Sevens Stadium, Dubai

=== Pool B ===
| Pos | Team | Pld | W | L | PF | PA | PD | Pts |
|---|---|---|---|---|---|---|---|---|
| 1 | Canada | 3 | 2 | 1 | 72 | 43 | +29 | 7 |
| 2 | Belgium | 3 | 2 | 1 | 57 | 37 | +20 | 6 |
| 3 | Madagascar | 3 | 1 | 2 | 48 | 67 | -19 | 4 |
| 4 | Italy | 3 | 1 | 2 | 48 | 78 | -30 | 3 |

17 January
11:28

| Madagascar | 0–24 | Belgium |

The Sevens Stadium, Dubai

17 January
11:50

| Canada | 33–7 | Italy |

The Sevens Stadium, Dubai

17 January
14:44

| Madagascar | 31–19 | Italy |

The Sevens Stadium, Dubai

17 January
15:06

| Canada | 15–19 | Belgium |

The Sevens Stadium, Dubai

17 January
18:00

| Belgium | 14–22 | Italy |

The Sevens Stadium, Dubai

17 January
18:22

| Canada | 24–17 | Madagascar |

The Sevens Stadium, Dubai

== Knockout stage ==
=== 5th to 8th playoffs ===
5th place semifinals
18 January – 10:44 – The Sevens Stadium
Tonga | 26
Italy | 28
18 January – 11:06 – The Sevens Stadium
Madagascar | 26
Colombia | 10

5th place final
18 January – 14:22 – The Sevens Stadium
Italy | 22
Madagascar | 31
7th place final
18 January – 13:38 – The Sevens Stadium
Tonga | 21
Colombia | 26

=== Cup ===
Semifinals
18 January – 12:12 – The Sevens Stadium
Samoa | 14
Belgium | 26
18 January – 12:34 – The Sevens Stadium
Canada | 24
Hong Kong | 19

Final
18 January – 15:59 – The Sevens Stadium
Belgium | 10
Canada | 28
3rd place final
18 January – 15:06 – The Sevens Stadium
Samoa | 26
Hong Kong | 5

== Final placings ==
| Place | Team |
|---|---|
| 1st place, gold medalist(s) | Canada |
| 2nd place, silver medalist(s) | Belgium |
| 3rd place, bronze medalist(s) | Samoa |
| 4 | Hong Kong |
| 5 | Madagascar |
| 6 | Italy |
| 7 | Colombia |
| 8 | Tonga |

Legend
| Green | Qualified for SVNS 2 |

== See also ==
- 2026 SVNS 3 – Women's tour
