= 2026 Brazil SVNS 2 =

Rugby sevens competition

- 2026 SVNS 2
- Host nation: Brazil
- Date: 28–29 March 2026

Men
- Champion: Belgium
- Runner-up: Kenya
- Third: Uruguay

Women
- Champion: Brazil
- Runner-up: Kenya
- Third: Spain

The 2026 Brazil SVNS 2 was a rugby sevens tournament at the Estádio Nicolau Alayon, São Paulo, Brazil. Six men's teams and six women's teams will participate.

== Men's tournament ==
Pos	Team	Pld	W	L	PF	PA	PD	Pts
1	Belgium	5	4	1	118	97	+21	13
2	Kenya	5	4	1	147	49	+98	13
3	Uruguay	5	3	2	102	105	–3	10
4	United States	5	3	2	102	86	+16	9
5	Canada	5	1	4	89	144	–55	5
6	Germany	5	0	5	69	146	–77	2

28 March 2026
10:00

Uruguay	24–22	Canada

28 March 2026
10:22

Germany	7–38	Kenya

28 March 2026
10:44

United States	15–24	Belgium

28 March 2026
13:12

Kenya	12–14	Belgium

28 March 2026
13:35

Germany	19–26	Uruguay

28 March 2026
13:56

United States	26–12	Canada

28 March 2026
16:00

Germany	17–28	Belgium

28 March 2026
16:21

Kenya	40–0	Canada

28 March 2026
16:43

United States	19–14	Uruguay

29 March 2026
11:00

Uruguay	24–19	Belgium

29 March 2026
11:22

Germany	21–26	Canada

29 March 2026
11:44

United States	14–31	Kenya

29 March 2026
14:12

Canada	29–33	Belgium

29 March 2026
14:34

Kenya	26–14	Uruguay

29 March 2026
14:56

United States	28–5	Germany

== Women's tournament ==
Pos	Team	Pld	W	L	PF	PA	PD	Pts
1	Brazil	5	4	1	110	62	+48	12
2	Kenya	5	3	2	108	65	+43	10
3	Spain	5	3	2	91	81	+10	10
4	Argentina	5	3	2	64	68	-4	9
5	South Africa	5	1	4	55	74	-19	6
6	China	5	0	5	46	124	-78	3

28 March 2026
11:06

Spain	19–5	South Africa

28 March 2026
11:28

Argentina	19–12	Kenya

28 March 2026
11:50

China	17–19	Brazil

28 March 2026
14:18

South Africa	5–14	Kenya

28 March 2026
14:40

Spain	26–7	China

28 March 2026
15:02

Argentina	0–17	Brazil

28 March 2026
17:05

Spain	17–24	Kenya

28 March 2026
17:27

Argentina	19–12	China

28 March 2026
17:49

South Africa	26–12	Brazil

29 March 2026
12:06

China	0–46	Kenya

29 March 2026
12:28

Argentina	19–5	South Africa

29 March 2026
12:50

Spain	7–38	Brazil

29 March 2026
15:18

South Africa	14–10	China

29 March 2026
15:40

Argentina	7–22	Spain

29 March 2026
16:02

Brazil	24–12	Kenya

2026 SVNS 2
Preceded by 2026 Uruguay SVNS 2	2026 Brazil SVNS 2	Succeeded by None (last event)
