= 2002 Mar del Plata Sevens =

- IRB Sevens III
- Host nation: Argentina
- Date: 11–12 January 2002

Cup
- Champion: Fiji
- Runner-up: South Africa

Plate
- Winner: Australia
- Runner-up: England

Bowl
- Winner: France
- Runner-up: Canada

Shield
- Winner: Paraguay
- Runner-up: Chile

Tournament details
- Matches played: 41

The 2002 Mar del Plata Sevens was a rugby sevens tournament held at the Estadio José María Minella in Mar del Plata. The tournament took place from 11 to 12 January 2002 and was the sixth edition of the Mar del Plata Sevens and was also the third leg of the 2001–02 World Sevens Series.

Sixteen teams was separated into four groups of four with the top two teams qualifying through to the cup final while the bottom two competed in the bowl. After losing to South Africa in the pool stage and finishing second on their pool, Fiji went on to be champions title after getting their revenge and defeating South Africa 24–7 in the cup final. In the plate final, Australia defeated England 15–12. In the bowl final France defeated Canada 29–7. In the shield final Paraguay defeated Chile 21–14.

== Format ==
The teams were drawn into four pools of four teams each. Each team played the other teams in their pool once, with 3 points awarded for a win, 2 points for a draw, and 1 point for a loss (no points awarded for a forfeit). The pool stage was played on the first day of the tournament. The top two teams from each pool advanced to the Cup/Plate brackets. The bottom two teams from each pool went on to the Bowl bracket.

== Teams ==
The participating teams were:

- Argentina
- Australia
- Brazil
- Canada
- Chile
- England
- Fiji
- France
- New Zealand
- Paraguay
- Samoa
- South Africa
- Uruguay
- United States
- Wales
- West Indies

== Pool stage ==
The pool stage was played on the first day of the tournament. The 16 teams were separated into four pools of four teams and teams in the same pool played each other once. The top two teams in each pool advanced to the Cup quarterfinals to compete for the 2002 Santiago Sevens title.

Key to colours in group tables
| Teams that advanced to the Cup quarterfinals |
| Teams that advanced to the Bowl quarterfinals |

=== Pool A ===
| Pos | Team | Pld | W | D | L | PF | PA | PD | Pts |
|---|---|---|---|---|---|---|---|---|---|
| 1 | New Zealand | 3 | 3 | 0 | 0 | 90 | 10 | +80 | 9 |
| 2 | Argentina | 3 | 2 | 0 | 1 | 84 | 12 | +72 | 7 |
| 3 | France | 3 | 1 | 0 | 2 | 35 | 60 | −25 | 5 |
| 4 | West Indies | 3 | 0 | 0 | 3 | 12 | 139 | −127 | 3 |

11 January 2002

| New Zealand | 12–10 | Argentina |

Estadio José María Minella, Mar del Plata

11 January 2002

| France | 35–12 | West Indies |

Estadio José María Minella, Mar del Plata

11 January 2002

| Argentina | 22–0 | France |

Estadio José María Minella, Mar del Plata

11 January 2002

| New Zealand | 52–0 | West Indies |

Estadio José María Minella, Mar del Plata

11 January 2002

| Argentina | 52–0 | West Indies |

Estadio José María Minella, Mar del Plata

11 January 2002

| New Zealand | 26–0 | France |

Estadio José María Minella, Mar del Plata

=== Pool B ===
| Pos | Team | Pld | W | D | L | PF | PA | PD | Pts |
|---|---|---|---|---|---|---|---|---|---|
| 1 | Australia | 3 | 3 | 0 | 0 | 98 | 21 | +77 | 9 |
| 2 | England | 3 | 2 | 0 | 1 | 97 | 12 | +85 | 7 |
| 3 | Paraguay | 3 | 1 | 0 | 2 | 26 | 102 | −76 | 5 |
| 4 | Chile | 3 | 0 | 0 | 3 | 10 | 96 | −86 | 3 |

11 January 2002

| Australia | 12–7 | England |

Estadio José María Minella, Mar del Plata

11 January 2002

| Paraguay | 12–10 | Chile |

Estadio José María Minella, Mar del Plata

11 January 2002

| England | 45–0 | Chile |

Estadio José María Minella, Mar del Plata

11 January 2002

| Australia | 47–14 | Paraguay |

Estadio José María Minella, Mar del Plata

11 January 2002

| England | 45–0 | Paraguay |

Estadio José María Minella, Mar del Plata

11 January 2002

| Australia | 39–0 | Chile |

Estadio José María Minella, Mar del Plata

=== Pool C ===
| Pos | Team | Pld | W | D | L | PF | PA | PD | Pts |
|---|---|---|---|---|---|---|---|---|---|
| 1 | South Africa | 3 | 2 | 0 | 1 | 93 | 7 | +86 | 7 |
| 2 | Fiji | 3 | 2 | 0 | 1 | 57 | 20 | +37 | 7 |
| 3 | Canada | 3 | 1 | 0 | 2 | 35 | 69 | −34 | 5 |
| 4 | Brazil | 3 | 0 | 0 | 3 | 17 | 106 | −89 | 3 |

11 January 2002

| South Africa | 15-0 | Fiji |

Estadio José María Minella, Mar del Plata

11 January 2002

| Canada | 35–5 | Brazil |

Estadio José María Minella, Mar del Plata

11 January 2002

| Fiji | 31–0 | Canada |

Estadio José María Minella, Mar del Plata

11 January 2002

| South Africa | 45–7 | Brazil |

Estadio José María Minella, Mar del Plata

11 January 2002

| Fiji | 26–5 | Brazil |

Estadio José María Minella, Mar del Plata

11 January 2002

| South Africa | 33–0 | Canada |

Estadio José María Minella, Mar del Plata

=== Pool D ===
| Pos | Team | Pld | W | D | L | PF | PA | PD | Pts |
|---|---|---|---|---|---|---|---|---|---|
| 1 | Samoa | 3 | 3 | 0 | 0 | 102 | 10 | +92 | 9 |
| 2 | Wales | 3 | 2 | 0 | 1 | 64 | 36 | +28 | 7 |
| 3 | United States | 3 | 1 | 0 | 2 | 52 | 57 | −5 | 5 |
| 4 | Uruguay | 3 | 0 | 0 | 3 | 0 | 115 | −115 | 3 |

11 January 2002

| Samoa | 19–10 | Wales |

Estadio José María Minella, Mar del Plata

11 January 2002

| United States | 35–0 | Uruguay |

Estadio José María Minella, Mar del Plata

11 January 2002

| Wales | 21–17 | United States |

Estadio José María Minella, Mar del Plata

11 January 2002

| Samoa | 47–0 | Uruguay |

Estadio José María Minella, Mar del Plata

11 January 2002

| Wales | 33–0 | Uruguay |

Estadio José María Minella, Mar del Plata

11 January 2002

| Samoa | 36–0 | United States |

Estadio José María Minella, Mar del Plata

== Knockout stage ==
=== Shield ===
Semi-finals
12 January 2002 – Estadio José María Minella
Chile | 15
Brazil | 10
12 January 2002 – Estadio José María Minella
Paraguay | 17
Uruguay | 14

Final
12 January 2002 – Estadio José María Minella
Chile | 14
Paraguay | 21

=== Bowl ===
Quarter-finals
5 January 2002 – Estadio José María Minella
France | 33
Chile | 5
5 January 2002 – Estadio José María Minella
United States | 47
Brazil | 0
12 January 2002 – Estadio José María Minella
Paraguay | 12
West Indies | 33
12 January 2002 – Estadio José María Minella
Canada | 15
Uruguay | 0

Semi-finals
12 January 2002 – Estadio José María Minella
France | 10
United States | 10
12 January 2002 – Estadio José María Minella
West Indies | 0
Canada | 24

Final
12 January 2002 – Estadio José María Minella
France | 29
Canada | 7

=== Plate ===
Semi-finals
12 January 2002 – Estadio José María Minella
England | 19
Samoa | 12
12 January 2002 – Estadio José María Minella
Australia | 31
Wales | 0

Final
12 January 2002 – Estadio José María Minella
England | 12
Australia | 15

=== Cup ===
Quarter-finals
12 January 2002 – Estadio José María Minella
New Zealand | 26
England | 5
12 January 2002 – Estadio José María Minella
Fiji | 26
Samoa | 0
12 January 2002 – Estadio José María Minella
Australia | 3
Argentina | 5
12 January 2002 – Estadio José María Minella
South Africa | 56
Wales | 0

Semi-finals
12 January 2002 – Estadio José María Minella
New Zealand | 0
Fiji | 5
12 January 2002 – Estadio José María Minella
Argentina | 7
South Africa | 17

Final
12 January 2002 – Estadio José María Minella
Fiji | 24
South Africa | 7

== Tournament placings ==
| Place | Team | Points |
|---|---|---|
| 1st place, gold medalist(s) | Fiji | 20 |
| 2nd place, silver medalist(s) | South Africa | 16 |
| 3rd place, bronze medalist(s) | New Zealand | 12 |
| 3rd place, bronze medalist(s) | Argentina | 12 |
| 5 | Australia | 8 |
| 6 | England | 6 |
| 7 | Samoa | 4 |
| 7 | Wales | 4 |

| Place | Team | Points |
|---|---|---|
| 9 | France | 2 |
| 10 | Canada | 0 |
| 11 | United States | 0 |
| 11 | West Indies | 0 |
| 13 | Paraguay | 0 |
| 14 | Chile | 0 |
| 15 | Uruguay | 0 |
| 15 | Brazil | 0 |

Source: Rugby7.com

IRB Sevens III
| Preceded by 2001 South Africa Sevens | 2002 Mar del Plata Sevens Sevens | Succeeded by 2002 Wellington Sevens |
Mar del Plata Sevens
| Preceded by 2001 Mar del Plata Sevens | 2002 Mar del Plata Sevens | Succeeded by 2003 Mar del Plata Sevens |
