= SVNS 2 =

Annual series of international rugby sevens tournaments

- Current seasons
- ^{2026 SVNS 2}
- Sport: Rugby sevens
- First season: 2026; 0 years ago
- No. of teams: 6 (men's); 6 (women's)
- Qualification: SVNS 3
- Level on pyramid: 2
- Promotion to: SVNS (men's); SVNS (women's)

The SVNS 2 (officially the HSBC SVNS 2) is an annual series of rugby sevens tournaments for national teams run by World Rugby that includes men's and women's events. Sponsored by banking group HSBC, it is the second tier of competition below SVNS. Teams on the respective men's and women's tours of the series compete for promotion to the first tier.

The 2026 SVNS 2 season will comprise three tournaments. The top four teams in aggregate points will advance to the SVNS World Championship.

== Teams ==
The six men's teams and six women's teams expected to compete at the 2026 SVNS 2.

=== Men's teams ===
- Kenya
- United States
- Germany
- Uruguay
- Belgium
- Canada

=== Women's teams ===
- Argentina
- China
- Kenya
- Spain
- Brazil
- South Africa

== Historical results ==
=== Results by season – Men ===
Summary of the top six placegetters for each series:

Series	Season	Rds	Champion	Second	Third	Fourth	Fifth	Sixth	Ref
I	2026	1	United States	Kenya	Germany	Uruguay	Belgium	Canada	

=== Results by season – Women ===
Summary of the top six placegetters for each series:

Series	Season	Rds	Champion	Second	Third	Fourth	Fifth	Sixth	Ref
I	2026	1	Argentina	Spain	South Africa	Brazil	Kenya	China	
