= 2026 Kenya SVNS 2 =

Rugby sevens competition

- 2026 SVNS 2
- Host nation: Kenya
- Date: 14–15 February 2026

Men
- Champion: Germany
- Runner-up: United States
- Third: Kenya

Women
- Champion: Argentina
- Runner-up: South Africa
- Third: Spain

Tournament details
- Matches played: 30

The 2026 Kenya SVNS 2 was a rugby sevens tournament at the Nyayo National Stadium, Nairobi, Kenya. Six men's teams and six women's teams will participate.

== Men's tournament ==
Pos	Team	Pld	W	L	PF	PA	PD	Pts
1	Germany	5	4	1	95	60	+35	13
2	United States	5	4	1	126	54	+72	12
3	Kenya	5	4	1	99	50	+49	12
4	Uruguay	5	2	3	116	79	+37	8
5	Belgium	5	1	4	31	130	−99	4
6	Canada	5	0	5	55	149	−94	1

14 February 2026
9:05

United States	40–0	Belgium

14 February 2026
9:28

Uruguay	14-19	Germany

14 February 2026
9:50

Kenya	29–12	Canada

14 February 2026
12:08

Uruguay	14–17	United States

14 February 2026
12:30

Germany	26–17	Canada

14 February 2026
12:52

Kenya	33–0	Belgium

14 February 2026
15:10

United States	41–7	Canada

14 February 2026
15:32

Uruguay	38–14	Belgium

14 February 2026
15:52

Kenya	15–10 (a.e.t.)	Germany

15 February 2026
11:06

Canada	7–10	Belgium

15 February 2026
11:28

United States	7–28	Germany

15 February 2026
11:50

Kenya	17–7	Uruguay

15 February 2026
15:18

Germany	12–7	Belgium

15 February 2026
15:40

Uruguay	43–12	Canada

15 February 2026
16:02

Kenya	5–21	United States

=== Final standings ===
Pos	Team
1st place, gold medalist(s)	Germany
2nd place, silver medalist(s)	United States
3rd place, bronze medalist(s)	Kenya
4	Uruguay
5	Belgium
6	Canada

== Women's tournament ==
Pos	Team	Pld	W	L	PF	PA	PD	Pts
1	Argentina	5	4	1	84	61	+23	13
2	South Africa	5	4	1	76	51	+25	12
3	Spain	5	3	2	93	59	+34	11
4	China	5	2	3	54	91	−37	6
5	Kenya	5	1	4	42	58	−16	6
6	Brazil	5	1	4	67	96	−29	4

14 February 2026
8:00

China	10–20	Argentina

14 February 2026
8:22

Spain	12–14	South Africa

14 February 2026
8:44

Brazil	12–15	Kenya

14 February 2026
11:00

Spain	17–19	Argentina

14 February 2026
11:24

Brazil	12–0	South Africa

14 February 2026
11:45

China	15–12	Kenya

14 February 2026
14:04

Brazil	17–28	Argentina

14 February 2026
14:26

China	0–21	Spain

14 February 2026
14:48

Kenya	10–12	South Africa

15 February 2026
10:00

China	5–33	South Africa

15 February 2026
10:22

Brazil	21–29	Spain

15 February 2026
10:44

Kenya	0–5	Argentina

15 February 2026
14:12

South Africa	17–12 (a.e.t.)	Argentina

15 February 2026
14:34

Brazil	5–24	China

5 February 2026
14:56

Spain	14–5	Kenya

=== Final standings ===
Pos	Team
1st place, gold medalist(s)	Argentina
2nd place, silver medalist(s)	South Africa
3rd place, bronze medalist(s)	Spain
4	China
5	Kenya
6	Brazil

2026 SVNS 2
Preceded by None (first event)	2026 Kenya SVNS 2	Succeeded by 2026 Uruguay SVNS 2
