= 2026 SVNS 3 – Women's tour =

Rugby sevens competition

2026 SVNS 3
- Women's tour – Series I
- Hosts: United Arab Emirates
- Date: 17–18 January 2026
- Nations: 8

Final positions
- Champions: South Africa
- Runners-up: Argentina
- Third: Czech Republic

Series details
- Top try scorer: Nadine Roos (54)
- Top point scorer: Maria Tshiremba (7)

The 2026 SVNS 3 – Women's tour is the first season of the third-tier global rugby sevens competition for women's national teams.

== Teams and venue ==
There are eight men's national teams competing in the 2026 SVNS 3.

Date qualified	Means of qualification	Nation
25 May 2025	2025 Sudamérica Rugby Women's Sevens	Argentina
25 May 2025	2025 Sudamérica Rugby Women's Sevens	Colombia
29 June 2025	2025 Rugby Europe Women's Sevens Championship Series	Czech Republic
29 June 2025	2025 Rugby Europe Women's Sevens Championship Series	Poland
23 November 2025	2025 RAN Women's Sevens	Mexico
22 June 2025	2025 Africa Women's Sevens	South Africa
19 October 2025	2025 Asia Rugby Women's Sevens Series	Thailand
8 December 2024	2024 Oceania Women's Sevens Championship	Samoa
Totals	6	8

Venue
Country	Location	Stadium
UAE	Dubai	The Sevens Stadium

== Pool stage ==
=== Pool A ===
Pos	Team	Pld	W	L	PF	PA	PD	Pts
1	South Africa	3	3	0	118	10	+108	9
2	Czech Republic	3	2	1	91	29	+62	6
3	Thailand	3	1	2	55	65	−10	3
4	Mexico	3	0	3	0	160	-160	0

17 January
10:44

Thailand	5–32	Czech Republic

The Sevens Stadium, Dubai

17 January	South Africa	61–0	Mexico	The Sevens Stadium, Dubai
11:06	Try: Tshiremba 2'c, 5' c, 7' c, 8'c Boer 9' c Malinga 9' c Mokone 10'm, 13' c Roos 15' c Con: Roos (8/9) 3', 5', 7', 9', 8', 9', 13', 15'

17 January
14:00

Thailand	45–0	Mexico

The Sevens Stadium, Dubai

17 January	South Africa	24–5	Czech Republic	The Sevens Stadium, Dubai
14:22	Try: Lamprecht 1'c Roos 4' m, 12' c Tshiremba 6' m Con: Roos (2/4) 1', 12'		Try: Durychova 7' m

17 January
17:16

Czech Republic	52–0	Mexico

The Sevens Stadium, Dubai

17 January	South Africa	33–5	Thailand	The Sevens Stadium, Dubai
17:38	Try: Fortuin 4'c Boer 6' c Lamprecht 8' c Mpupha 12' c Malinga 14' m Tries; Con: Roos (3/3) 4', 6', 8'; Dolf (1/2) 13'		Try: Laksina Nawakaew 2' m

=== Pool B ===
Pos	Team	Pld	W	L	PF	PA	PD	Pts
1	Argentina	3	3	0	84	5	+76	9
2	Poland	3	2	1	67	32	+35	6
3	Colombia	3	1	3	19	59	-33	3
4	Samoa	3	0	3	19	97	-78	1

17 January
10:00

Colombia	5–31	Poland

The Sevens Stadium, Dubai

17 January
10:22

Argentina	45–0	Samoa

The Sevens Stadium, Dubai

17 January
13:16

Colombia	21–14	Samoa

The Sevens Stadium, Dubai

17 January
13:38

Argentina	22–5	Poland

The Sevens Stadium, Dubai

17 January
16:32

Poland	31–5	Samoa

The Sevens Stadium, Dubai

17 January
16:54

Argentina	14–0	Colombia

The Sevens Stadium, Dubai

== Knockout stage ==
=== 5th to 8th playoffs ===
5th place semifinals
18 January – 10:00 – The Sevens Stadium
Thailand	31
Samoa	10
18 January – 10:22 – The Sevens Stadium
Colombia	26
Mexico	10

5th place final
18 January – 14:00 – The Sevens Stadium
Thailand	0
Colombia	17
7th place final
18 January – 13:16 – The Sevens Stadium
Samoa	29
Mexico	0

=== Cup ===
Semifinals
18 January – 11:28 – The Sevens Stadium
South Africa	36
Poland	5
18 January – 11:50 – The Sevens Stadium
Argentina	22
Czech Republic	12

Final
18 January – 15:31 – The Sevens Stadium
South Africa	12
Argentina	5
3rd place final
18 January – 14:44 – The Sevens Stadium
Poland	14
Czech Republic	24

== Final placings ==
Place	Team
1st place, gold medalist(s)	South Africa
2nd place, silver medalist(s)	Argentina
3rd place, bronze medalist(s)	Czech Republic
4	Poland
5	Colombia
6	Thailand
7	Samoa
8	Mexico

Legend
Green	Qualified for SVNS 2

== See also ==
- 2026 SVNS 3 – Men's tour
