= Mar del Plata Sevens =

International rugby sevens competition

Mar del Plata Super Sevens
- Current season, competition or edition: 2026
- Sport: Rugby sevens
- First season: 1995; 31 years ago
- Organizing body: Mar del Plata Rugby Union
- No. of teams: 8 (2026)
- Country: Argentina
- Region: Mar del Plata
- Venue: Newbery Athletic Club
- Most recent champion: Argentina (2026)
- Most titles: Argentina (5 titles)

The Mar del Plata Super Sevens (Spanish: Super Seven de Mar del Plata) is an international rugby sevens competition played in Mar del Plata, Argentina since 1995. The tournament was one of the events in the World Rugby Sevens Series in 2000 and 2002.

As of 2026, the tournament is contested by 8 teams (4 national teams and 4 regional teams from Argentina, Brazil, Paraguay, and Uruguay), and 17 editions have been held.

Argentina is the most winning team of the competition with 4 titles.

== History ==
=== International 7s and World Series: 1995 to 2002 ===
Inspired by the success of Uruguay's Punta del Este Sevens, which hosted many of the world's best teams during the 1990s, the Argentine Rugby Union introduced an international tournament of their own in 1995. The inaugural Mar del Plata International Sevens was won by New Zealand, defeating Fiji in a closely matched final by 26–21. In 2000, the tournament was included in World Sevens Series I, the first edition of the worldwide circuit for seven-a-side rugby. The following year Mar del Plata was host of the Rugby World Cup Sevens.

=== Selected teams invitational event: 2003 onward ===
After 2002, when no longer on the World Sevens circuit, the international sevens tournament at Mar del Plata was contested by invited national teams – mainly from the Americas but some further afield – as well as by selected and invitational sides (mostly representative teams from Argentina).

During this era, the international tournament was sometimes hosted in conjunction with other competitions featuring national teams. This was the case in 2010 when the schedule included the Sudamérica Rugby Sevens, and teams from that tournament were joined by other select sides including from United States and South Africa to contest the Mar del Plata international sevens title. In 2015, Mar del Plata hosted a Pan American Games qualification event alongside the international sevens tournament.

== Results ==
Keys

- tournament of the Sudamérica Rugby Sevens
- tournament of the Rugby World Cup Sevens
- Gold, Silver and Bronze cups are the nominal trophies for many rugby sevens tournaments in South America. These are generally equivalent to the Cup, Plate and Bowl – for first, fifth and ninth place, respectively – as awarded in the traditional sevens tournament with sixteen teams. For an event with a different number of teams or divisions, however, these trophies may awarded differently.

Ed.	Year	Venue	Gold Cup			Placings		Refs
Ed.	Year	Venue	(gold) Champion	Score	(silver) Runner-up	Silver Cup	Bronze Cup	Refs
1	1995	José M. Minella	New Zealand	26–21	Fiji	Canada	n/a	
2	1998	José M. Minella	New Zealand	40–19	Argentina	Spain	n/a	
3	1999	José M. Minella	New Zealand	38–5	France	Italy	n/a	
4	2000	José M. Minella	Fiji	26–14	New Zealand	Argentina	Spain	
5	2001	José M. Minella	New Zealand	31–12	Australia	Russia	Chile	
6	2002	José M. Minella	Fiji	24–7	South Africa	Australia	France	
7	2010	José M. Minella	SA 7s Academy	29–7	Argentina	Uruguay	Brazil	
8	2013	José M. Minella	Chile	14–12	(Argentina) Buenos Aires	(Argentina) Salta	(Argentina) Entre Ríos	
9	2014 (Note: The 2014 tournament was intended to be for national teams only but Brazil and Uruguay focused instead on the Viña Sevens which offered qualifying spots for the 2014 Hong Kong Sevens. So Argentina, Chile and Paraguay competed at Mar del Plata, along with five UAR affiliated unions.)	Justo Román (Note: Municipal stadium and athletics track.)	Argentina (Note: Named "Argentina Pampas".)	35–12	(Argentina) Buenos Aires	(Argentina) Salta	Chile	
10	2015 (Note: The international sevens for 2015 was hosted at the C.A. Aldosivi's facilities in conjunction with two other tournaments to determine qualifying places for the Pan American Games in Toronto later that year: one event for men and one for women.)	Complejo Aldosivi (Note: "Predio Salvador Tatore Vuoso", C.A. Aldosivi's facilities in the port of Mar del Plata. The complex is named after a notable striker of the club.)	Argentina	26–21	(Argentina) Litoral 7s (Note: Litoral 7 is a combination of players from the Rosario, Entrerriana, and Santafesina rugby unions.)	(Argentina) Mar del Plata	(United States) USA Falcons	
11	2016	Parque Camet	Argentina	14–7	SA 7s Academy	Chile	Brazil	
12	2017	IPR Sporting (Note: "IPR", initials of "Instituto Peralta Ramos Sporting Club", a sports club in Mar del Plata.)	(Argentina) Atlético del Rosario	14–7	(Argentina) Bruto	(Argentina) Universitario RC		
13	2018	IPR Sporting	(Argentina) Atlético del Rosario	10–0	(Argentina) Taraguy	(Argentina) Jockey Club (R)	n/a	
14	2019	IPR Sporting	(Argentina) Córdoba A.C.	27–0	(Argentina) Hindú	(Paraguay) Kingfish	n/a	
15	2020	IPR Sporting	Uruguay	10–7	(Argentina) Duendes	Chile	(Argentina) Córdoba A.C.	
16	2025	Newbery A.C. (Note: "Newbery Athletic Club" is a private football club in Mar del Plata. It has a complex with 13 pitches of natural and artificial turf.)	Argentina (Note: Named "Argentina Desarrollo", a development team of the Argentine Rugby Union (UAR) made up of players with potential for the senior national team (Los Pumas) and for Los Pumas 7s, serving as a bridge for high performance and the projection of young talents, integrating players with experience in the circuit.)	14–5	(Argentina) Mar del Plata	Brazil	(Argentina) Newbery A.C.	
17	2026	Newbery A.C.	Argentina	33–0	Uruguay			

=== Titles by team ===
Team	Titles	Winning years
Argentina (Note: The team has received different names through the competition, such as "Argentina Pampas", or "Argentina Desarrollo".)	5	2014, 2015, 2016, 2025, 2026
New Zealand	4	1995, 1998, 1999, 2001
Fiji	2	2000, 2002
(Argentina) Atlético del Rosario	2	2017, 2018

== Women's tournament ==
Winners since 2014 (details might not be complete):

Ed.	Year	Venue	Gold Cup			Placings		Refs
Ed.	Year	Venue	(gold) Champion	Score	(silver) Runner-up	Silver Cup	Bronze Cup	Refs
1	2014	Justo Román	Argentina	38–0	Uruguay	Paraguay	Chile	
2	2015	Predio Aldosivi	Argentina	– (Note: The 2015 women's competition was played as a Pan American qualifier over two round robin tournament days, with the two top placed teams qualifying for the Pan Am Games rugby sevens. Argentina and Colombia qualified.)	Colombia	Venezuela	Chile	
