= 2002 Wellington Sevens =

- IRB Sevens III
- Host nation: New Zealand
- Date: 8–9 February 2002

Cup
- Champion: South Africa
- Runner-up: Samoa

Plate
- Winner: Argentina
- Runner-up: Wales

Bowl
- Winner: France
- Runner-up: Canada

Shield
- Winner: Cook Islands
- Runner-up: Papua New Guinea

Tournament details
- Matches played: 44

The 2002 Wellington Sevens, also known as the 2002 New Zealand Sevens, was an international rugby sevens tournament that was held in Wellington, New Zealand as the fifth leg of the 2001–02 World Sevens Series. The tournament took place at the Westpac Stadium on 8–9 February 2002.

The tournament was won by South Africa, who defeated Samoa 17–14 in the cup final. Argentina defeated Wales 55–12 in the plate final. France defeated Canada 26–5 in the bowl final. Cook Islands defeated Papua New Guinea 38–14 in the shield final.

== Format ==
The teams were drawn into four pools of four teams each. Each team played the other teams in their pool once, with 3 points awarded for a win, 2 points for a draw, and 1 point for a loss (no points awarded for a forfeit). The pool stage was played on the first day of the tournament. The top two teams from each pool advanced to the Cup/Plate brackets. The bottom two teams from each group went to the Bowl/Shield brackets.

== Teams ==
The 16 participating teams for the tournament:

- Argentina
- Australia
- Canada
- China
- Cook Islands
- England
- Fiji
- France
- Japan
- New Zealand
- Papua New Guinea
- Samoa
- South Africa
- Tonga
- United States
- Wales

== Pool stage ==
Key to colours in group tables
Teams that advanced to the Cup quarterfinals
Teams that advanced to the Bowl quarterfinals

=== Pool A ===
Pos	Team	Pld	W	D	L	PF	PA	PD	Pts
1	New Zealand	3	3	0	0	147	14	133	9
2	England	3	2	0	1	171	71	0	7
3	United States	3	1	0	2	61	71	-10	5
4	Papua New Guinea	3	0	0	3	0	123	-123	3

8 February 2002

New Zealand	50–7	England

Westpac Stadium, Wellington

8 February 2002

United States	33–0	Papua New Guinea

Westpac Stadium, Wellington

8 February 2002

New Zealand	52–0	Papua New Guinea

Westpac Stadium, Wellington

8 February 2002

England	26–21	United States

Westpac Stadium, Wellington

8 February 2002

New Zealand	45–7	United States

Westpac Stadium, Wellington

8 February 2002

England	38–0	Papua New Guinea

Westpac Stadium, Wellington

Source: World Rugby

=== Pool B ===
Pos	Team	Pld	W	D	L	PF	PA	PD	Pts
1	Fiji	3	3	0	0	142	14	128	9
2	Wales	3	2	0	1	43	80	-37	7
3	Canada	3	1	0	2	47	72	-25	5
4	Tonga	3	0	0	3	26	92	-66	3

8 February 2002

Fiji	52–0	Wales

Westpac Stadium, Wellington

8 February 2002

Canada	26–5	Tonga

Westpac Stadium, Wellington

8 February 2002

Fiji	40–7	Tonga

Westpac Stadium, Wellington

8 February 2002

Wales	17–14	Canada

Westpac Stadium, Wellington

8 February 2002

Fiji	50–7	Canada

Westpac Stadium, Wellington

8 February 2002

Wales	26–14	Tonga

Westpac Stadium, Wellington

=== Pool C ===
Pos	Team	Pld	W	D	L	PF	PA	PD	Pts
1	Argentina	3	3	0	0	82	34	48	9
2	Australia	3	2	0	1	50	24	26	7
3	Japan	3	1	0	2	38	60	-22	5
4	Cook Islands	3	0	0	3	15	67	-52	3

8 February 2002

Australia	21–7	Japan

Westpac Stadium, Wellington

8 February 2002

Argentina	31–10	Cook Islands

Westpac Stadium, Wellington

8 February 2002

Japan	19–15	Cook Islands

Westpac Stadium, Wellington

8 February 2002

Argentina	17–12	Australia

Westpac Stadium, Wellington

8 February 2002

Australia	17–0	Cook Islands

Westpac Stadium, Wellington

8 February 2002

Argentina	34–12	Japan

Westpac Stadium, Wellington

=== Pool D ===
Pos	Team	Pld	W	D	L	PF	PA	PD	Pts
1	South Africa	3	2	0	0	103	29	74	7
2	Samoa	3	2	0	1	93	35	58	7
3	France	3	2	0	1	50	52	-2	7
4	China	3	0	0	1	12	142	-130	3

Source: World Rugby

8 February 2002

South Africa	35–12	Samoa

Westpac Stadium, Wellington

8 February 2002

France	33–12	China

Westpac Stadium, Wellington

8 February 2002

South Africa	61–0	China

Westpac Stadium, Wellington

8 February 2002

Samoa	33–0	France

Westpac Stadium, Wellington

8 February 2002

France	17–7	South Africa

Westpac Stadium, Wellington

8 February 2002

Samoa	48–0	China

Westpac Stadium, Wellington

== Knockout stage ==
=== Shield ===
Semi-finals
9 February 2002 – Westpac Stadium
Tonga	14
Cook Islands	19
9 February 2002 – Westpac Stadium
Papua New Guinea	31
China	17

Final
9 February 2002 – Westpac Stadium
Cook Islands	28
Papua New Guinea	14

=== Bowl ===
Quarter-finals
9 February 2002 – Westpac Stadium
United States	21
Tonga	14
9 February 2002 – Westpac Stadium
France	10
Cook Islands	5
9 February 2002 – Westpac Stadium
Canada	33
Papua New Guinea	7
9 February 2002 – Westpac Stadium
Japan	36
China	5

Semi-finals
9 February 2002 – Westpac Stadium
United States	14
France	31
9 February 2002 – Westpac Stadium
Canada	22
Japan	12

Final
9 February 2002 – Westpac Stadium
France	26
Canada	5

=== Plate ===
Semi-finals
9 February 2002 – Westpac Stadium
Wales	19
Australia	14
9 February 2002 – Westpac Stadium
Fiji	12
Argentina	21

Final
9 February 2002 – Westpac Stadium
Wales	12
Argentina	52

=== Cup ===
Quarter-finals
9 February 2002 – Westpac Stadium
New Zealand	78
Wales	12
9 February 2002 – Westpac Stadium
South Africa	28
Australia	0
9 February 2002 – Westpac Stadium
England	19
Fiji	14
9 February 2002 – Westpac Stadium
Argentina	7
Samoa	14

Semi-finals
9 February 2002 – Westpac Stadium
New Zealand	10
South Africa	26
9 February 2002 2001 – Westpac Stadium
England	5
Samoa	36

Final
9 February 2002 – Westpac Stadium
South Africa	17
Samoa	14

== Tournament placings ==
Place	Team	Points
1st place, gold medalist(s)	South Africa	20
2nd place, silver medalist(s)	Samoa	16
3rd place, bronze medalist(s)	New Zealand	12
3rd place, bronze medalist(s)	England	12
5	Argentina	8
6	Wales	6
7	Fiji	4
7	Australia	4

Place	Team	Points
9	France	2
10	Canada	0
11	United States	0
11	Japan	0
13	Cook Islands	0
14	Papua New Guinea	0
15	Tonga	0
15	China	0

IRB Sevens II
Preceded by 2002 Brisbane Sevens	2002 Wellington Sevens Sevens	Succeeded by 2002 Beijing Sevens
New Zealand Sevens
Preceded by 2001 Wellington Sevens	2001 Wellington Sevens	Succeeded by 2003 Wellington Sevens
