= 2001–02 World Sevens Series =

2001–02 IRB Sevens
- Series III
- Hosts: South Africa; Chile; Argentina; Australia; New Zealand; China; Hong Kong; Singapore; Malaysia; England; Wales

Final positions
- Champions: New Zealand
- Runners-up: South Africa
- Third: England

The 2001–02 World Sevens Series was the third edition of the global circuit for men's national rugby sevens teams, organised by the International Rugby Board. The series ran from November 2001 to May 2002. New Zealand was the series champion for a third consecutive year, and won seven of the eleven tournaments. No other country won more than one tournament during the season. South Africa and England won their first tournaments on the world circuit and finished in second and third place on the final series standings, respectively.

== Calendar ==
Twelve tournaments were originally scheduled for the 2001–02 series but, after several teams withdrew from 2001 Dubai Sevens in the wake of the September 11 attacks that year, the tournament was downgraded in status and excluded from the official series standings.

2001–02 Itinerary
Leg	Venue	Dates	Winner
Durban	Absa Stadium, Durban	17–18 November 2001	New Zealand
Santiago	Estadio San Carlos de Apoquindo, Santiago	4–5 January 2002	New Zealand
Mar del Plata	Estadio José María Minella, Mar del Plata	11–12 January 2002	Fiji
Brisbane	Ballymore Stadium, Brisbane	2–3 February 2002	Australia
Wellington	Westpac Stadium, Wellington	8–9 February 2002	South Africa
Beijing	Olympic Sports Centre, Beijing	16–17 March 2002	New Zealand
Hong Kong	Hong Kong Stadium, Hong Kong	22–24 March 2002	England
Singapore	National Stadium, Singapore	20–21 April 2002	New Zealand
Kuala Lumpur	MBPJ Stadium, Kuala Lumpur	27–28 April 2002	New Zealand
London	Twickenham, London	24–25 May 2002	New Zealand
Cardiff	Millennium Stadium, Cardiff	30 May to 1 June 2002	New Zealand

== Final standings ==
The points awarded to teams at each event, as well as the overall season totals, are shown in the table below. Gold indicates the event champions. Silver indicates the event runner-ups. A zero (0) is recorded in the event column where a team played in a tournament but did not gain any points. A dash (–) is recorded in the event column if a team did not compete at a tournament.

2001–02 IRB Sevens – Series III
Pos.	Event Team	Durban	Santiago	Mar Del Plata	Brisbane	Wellington	Beijing	Hong Kong	Singapore	Kuala Lumpur	London	Cardiff	Points total
1	New Zealand	20	20	12	16	12	20	18	20	20	20	20	198
2	South Africa	12	12	16	12	20	16	4	4	16	16	8	136
3	England	12	6	6	4	12	8	30	12	8	12	16	126
4	Fiji	6	12	20	8	4	12	24	8	12	4	12	122
5	Australia	8	4	8	20	4	12	8	12	12	8	12	108
6	Samoa	16	8	4	12	16	6	8	6	4	6	4	90
7	Argentina	4	16	12	6	8	4	8	16	6	4	2	86
8	Wales	0	4	4	0	6	0	18	2	4	12	0	50
9	France	4	0	2	0	2	2	2	–	–	2	6	20
10	Scotland	0	–	–	–	–	–	3	4	2	0	4	13
11	United States	–	2	0	4	0	4	2	–	–	–	–	12
12	Canada	–	0	0	0	0	0	8	0	0	0	0	8
13	Cook Islands	–	–	–	2	0	–	–	–	–	–	–	2
14	Namibia	2	–	–	–	–	–	–	–	–	–	–	2
15	Morocco	0	–	–	–	–	–	1	–	–	–	–	1
—N/a	Japan	–	–	–	0	0	0	0	0	0	–	–	0
—N/a	China	–	–	–	0	0	0	0	–	–	–	–	0
—N/a	Chinese Taipei	–	–	–	–	–	0	0	0	0	–	–	0
—N/a	South Korea	–	–	–	–	–	0	0	0	0	–	–	0
—N/a	Portugal	0	–	–	–	–	–	0	–	–	0	0	0
—N/a	Papua New Guinea	–	–	–	0	0	–	0	–	–	–	–	0
—N/a	Singapore	–	–	–	–	–	–	0	0	0	–	–	0
—N/a	Thailand	–	–	–	–	–	–	0	0	0	–	–	0
—N/a	Georgia	0	–	–	–	–	–	–	–	–	0	0	0
—N/a	Russia	–	–	–	–	–	–	0	–	–	0	0	0
—N/a	Brazil	–	0	0	–	–	–	–	–	–	–	–	0
—N/a	Chile	–	0	0	–	–	–	–	–	–	–	–	0
—N/a	Paraguay	–	0	0	–	–	–	–	–	–	–	–	0
—N/a	Uruguay	–	0	0	–	–	–	–	–	–	–	–	0
—N/a	West Indies	–	0	0	–	–	–	–	–	–	–	–	0
—N/a	Tonga	–	–	–	0	0	–	–	–	–	–	–	0
—N/a	Hong Kong	–	–	–	–	–	0	0	–	–	–	–	0
—N/a	Malaysia	–	–	–	–	–	–	–	0	0	–	–	0
—N/a	Ireland	–	–	–	–	–	–	–	–	–	0	0	0
—N/a	Spain	–	–	–	–	–	–	–	–	–	0	0	0
—N/a	(Cooperation Council for the Arab States of the Gulf) Arabian Gulf	0	–	–	–	–	–	–	–	–	–	–	0
—N/a	Kenya	0	–	–	–	–	–	–	–	–	–	–	0
—N/a	Sri Lanka	–	–	–	–	–	–	0	–	–	–	–	0

Source: rugby7.com (archived)

Legend
Gold	Event Champions
Silver	Event Runner-ups

== Tournaments ==
=== Durban ===
Event	Winners	Score	Finalists	Semi-finalists
Cup	New Zealand	19–14	Samoa	South Africa; England
Plate	Australia	57–0	Fiji	Argentina; France
Bowl	Namibia	29–28	Wales	Scotland; Portugal
Shield	Kenya	20–17	Morocco	Georgia (Cooperation Council for the Arab States of the Gulf) Arabian Gulf

=== Santiago ===
Event	Winners	Score	Finalists	Semi-finalists
Cup	New Zealand	21–7	Argentina	South Africa; Fiji
Plate	Samoa	21–12	England	Australia; Wales
Bowl	United States	32–5	Canada	France; West Indies
Shield	Uruguay	19–10	Chile	Brazil; Paraguay

=== Mar del Plata ===
Event	Winners	Score	Finalists	Semi-finalists
Cup	Fiji	24–7	South Africa	New Zealand; Argentina
Plate	Australia	15–12	England	Samoa; Wales
Bowl	France	29–7	Canada	United States; West Indies
Shield	Paraguay	21–14	Chile	Uruguay; Brazil

=== Brisbane ===
Event	Winners	Score	Finalists	Semi-finalists
Cup	Australia	28–0	New Zealand	South Africa; Samoa
Plate	Fiji	12–5	Argentina	England; United States
Bowl	Cook Islands	36–7	Japan	Wales; Papua New Guinea
Shield	Canada	38–7	Tonga	France; China

=== Wellington ===
Event	Winners	Score	Finalists	Semi-finalists
Cup	South Africa	17–14	Samoa	New Zealand; England
Plate	Argentina	52–12	Wales	Fiji; Australia
Bowl	France	26–5	Canada	United States; Japan
Shield	Cook Islands	28–14	Papua New Guinea	Tonga; China

=== Beijing ===
Event	Winners	Score	Finalists	Semi-finalists
Cup	New Zealand	41–14	South Africa	Fiji; Australia
Plate	England	33–14	Samoa	Argentina; United States
Bowl	France	33–14	Canada	Wales; South Korea
Shield	Japan	40–5	Hong Kong	Chile; Chinese Taipei

=== Hong Kong ===
Event	Winners	Score	Finalists	Semi-finalists	Quarter-finalists
Cup	England	33–20	Fiji	New Zealand; Wales	Argentina; Australia; Canada; Samoa
Plate	South Africa	48–7	Scotland	France; United States	Hong Kong; Papua New Guinea; Portugal; South Korea
Bowl	Morocco	15–12	Chinese Taipei	China; Singapore	Japan; Russia; Sri Lanka; Thailand

=== Singapore ===
Event	Winners	Score	Finalists	Semi-finalists
Cup	New Zealand	21–17	Argentina	England; Australia
Plate	Fiji	64–5	Samoa	South Africa; Scotland
Bowl	Wales	36–31	Japan	Canada; Singapore
Shield	South Korea	31–27	Chinese Taipei	Malaysia; Thailand

=== Kuala Lumpur ===
Event	Winners	Score	Finalists	Semi-finalists
Cup	New Zealand	29–5	South Africa	Fiji; Australia
Plate	England	43–7	Argentina	Samoa; Wales
Bowl	Scotland	41–12	South Korea	Canada; Chinese Taipei
Shield	Japan	24–5	Malaysia	Singapore; Thailand

=== London ===
Event	Winners	Score	Finalists	Semi-finalists
Cup	New Zealand	54–14	South Africa	England; Wales
Plate	Australia	45–14	Samoa	Fiji; Argentina
Bowl	France	22–19	Canada	Portugal; Russia
Shield	Georgia	20–14	Scotland	Ireland; Spain

=== Cardiff ===
Event	Winners	Score	Finalists	Semi-finalists
Cup	New Zealand	24–12	England	Fiji; Australia
Plate	South Africa	40–0	France	Samoa; Scotland
Bowl	Argentina	40–24	Ireland	Canada; Portugal
Shield	Wales	31–22	Russia	Georgia; Spain
