= 2003 Wellington Sevens =

- IRB Sevens IV
- Host nation: New Zealand
- Date: 7–8 February 2003

Cup
- Champion: New Zealand
- Runner-up: England

Plate
- Winner: Samoa
- Runner-up: France

Bowl
- Winner: Canada
- Runner-up: Niue

Shield
- Winner: Tonga
- Runner-up: Japan

Tournament details
- Matches played: 44

The 2003 Wellington Sevens, also known as the 2003 New Zealand Sevens, was an international rugby sevens tournament that was held in Wellington, New Zealand as the third leg of the 2002–03 World Sevens Series. The tournament took place at the Westpac Stadium on 7–8 February 2003.

The hosts, New Zealand, won the Cup.

Niue finished second in the Bowl competition, which was the team's best result at that time.

== Format ==
The teams were drawn into four pools of four teams each. Each team played the other teams in their pool once, with 3 points awarded for a win, 2 points for a draw, and 1 point for a loss (no points awarded for a forfeit). The pool stage was played on the first day of the tournament. The top two teams from each pool advanced to the Cup/Plate brackets. The bottom two teams from each group went to the Bowl/Shield brackets.

== Teams ==
The 16 participating teams for the tournament:

- Argentina
- Australia
- Canada
- China
- Cook Islands
- England
- Fiji
- France
- Japan
- New Zealand
- Niue
- Papua New Guinea
- Samoa
- South Africa
- Tonga
- United States

== Pool stage ==
Key to colours in group tables
Teams that advanced to the Cup quarterfinals
Teams that advanced to the Bowl quarterfinals

=== Pool A ===
Team	Pld	W	D	L	PF	PA	PD	Pts
New Zealand	3	3	0	0	112	13	+99	9
England	3	2	0	1	77	41	+36	7
Tonga	3	1	0	2	63	80	−17	5
Papua New Guinea	3	0	0	3	28	146	−118	3

7 February 2003

New Zealand	24–0	England

Westpac Stadium, Wellington

7 February 2003

Tonga	40–21	Papua New Guinea

Westpac Stadium, Wellington

7 February 2003

England	28–17	Tonga

Westpac Stadium, Wellington

7 February 2003

New Zealand	57–7	Papua New Guinea

Westpac Stadium, Wellington

7 February 2003

England	49–0	Papua New Guinea

Westpac Stadium, Wellington

7 February 2003

New Zealand	31–6	Tonga

Westpac Stadium, Wellington

Source: Rugby7.com

=== Pool B ===
Team	Pld	W	D	L	PF	PA	PD	Pts
South Africa	3	2	1	0	110	26	+84	8
Samoa	3	2	1	0	94	21	+73	8
United States	3	1	0	2	31	85	−54	5
Cook Islands	3	0	0	3	12	115	−103	3

7 February 2003

Samoa	21–21	South Africa

Westpac Stadium, Wellington

7 February 2003

United States	26–12	Cook Islands

Westpac Stadium, Wellington

7 February 2003

Samoa	47–0	United States

Westpac Stadium, Wellington

7 February 2003

South Africa	63–0	Cook Islands

Westpac Stadium, Wellington

7 February 2003

Samoa	26–0	Cook Islands

Westpac Stadium, Wellington

7 February 2003

South Africa	26–5	United States

Westpac Stadium, Wellington

Source: Rugby7.com

=== Pool C ===
Team	Pld	W	D	L	PF	PA	PD	Pts
Australia	3	3	0	0	88	19	+69	9
Argentina	3	2	0	1	81	45	+36	7
Japan	3	1	0	2	50	64	−14	5
China	3	0	0	3	12	103	−91	3

7 February 2003

Australia	28–14	Argentina

Westpac Stadium, Wellington

7 February 2003

Japan	33–7	China

Westpac Stadium, Wellington

7 February 2003

Argentina	31–12	Japan

Westpac Stadium, Wellington

7 February 2003

Australia	34–0	China

Westpac Stadium, Wellington

7 February 2003

Argentina	36-5	China

Westpac Stadium, Wellington

7 February 2003

Australia	26–5	Japan

Westpac Stadium, Wellington

Source: Rugby7.com

=== Pool D ===
Team	Pld	W	D	L	PF	PA	PD	Pts
Fiji	3	3	0	0	114	33	+81	9
France	3	2	0	1	66	41	+25	7
Canada	3	1	0	2	60	66	−6	5
Niue	3	0	0	3	12	112	−100	3

7 February 2003

Fiji	29–14	France

Westpac Stadium, Wellington

7 February 2003

Canada	29–12	Niue

Westpac Stadium, Wellington

7 February 2003

France	19–12	Canada

Westpac Stadium, Wellington

7 February 2003

Fiji	50–0	Niue

Westpac Stadium, Wellington

7 February 2003

France	33–0	Niue

Westpac Stadium, Wellington

7 February 2003

Fiji	35–19	Canada

Westpac Stadium, Wellington

Source: Rugby7.com

== Knockout stage ==
=== Shield ===
Semi-finals
8 February 2003 – Westpac Stadium
Japan	29
Papua New Guinea	7
8 February 2003 – Westpac Stadium
Tonga	41
China	0

Final
8 February 2003 – Westpac Stadium
Japan	26
Tonga	29

Source: Rugby7.com

=== Bowl ===
Quarter-finals
8 February 2003 – Westpac Stadium
United States	28
Papua New Guinea	7
8 February 2003 – Westpac Stadium
Niue	25
Japan	0
8 February 2003 – Westpac Stadium
Canada	38
China	0
8 February 2003 – Westpac Stadium
Cook Islands	20
Tonga	14

Semi-finals
8 February 2003 – Westpac Stadium
United States	17
Niue	20
8 February 2003 – Westpac Stadium
Canada	31
Cook Islands	5

Final
8 February 2003 – Westpac Stadium
Niue	5
Canada	47

Source: Rugby7.com

=== Plate ===
Semi-finals
8 February 2003 – Westpac Stadium
France	22
South Africa	12
8 February 2003 – Westpac Stadium
Samoa	17
Argentina	14

Final
8 February 2003 – Westpac Stadium
France	5
Samoa	39

Source: Rugby7.com

=== Cup ===
Quarter-finals
8 February 2003 – Westpac Stadium
England	17
South Africa	7
8 February 2003 – Westpac Stadium
Australia	24
France	7
8 February 2003 – Westpac Stadium
Fiji	26
Argentina	5
8 February 2003 – Westpac Stadium
New Zealand	21
Samoa	19

Semi-finals
8 February 2003 – Westpac Stadium
England	21
Australia	15
8 February 2003 – Westpac Stadium
Fiji	22
New Zealand	24

Final
8 February 2003 – Westpac Stadium
England	26
New Zealand	38

Source: Rugby7.com

== Tournament placings ==
Place	Team	Points
1st place, gold medalist(s)	New Zealand	20
2nd place, silver medalist(s)	England	16
3rd place, bronze medalist(s)	Australia	12
3rd place, bronze medalist(s)	Fiji	12
5	Samoa	8
6	France	6
7	Argentina	4
7	South Africa	4

Place	Team	Points
9	Canada	2
10	Niue	0
11	Cook Islands	0
11	United States	0
13	Tonga	0
14	Japan	0
15	China	0
15	Papua New Guinea	0

Source: Rugby7.com

IRB Sevens IV
Preceded by 2003 George Sevens	2003 Wellington Sevens	Succeeded by 2003 Hong Kong Sevens
New Zealand Sevens
Preceded by 2002 Wellington Sevens	2003 Wellington Sevens	Succeeded by 2004 Wellington Sevens
