= Dave Moonlight =

Canada international rugby union player

- Born: David James Moonlight; 9 August 1979 (age 47) Whitby, Ontario
- Height: 182 cm (6 ft 0 in)
- Weight: 84 kg (13 st 3 lb)

Rugby union career
- Position: Wing
International career
Years	Team	Apps	(Points)
2004-2005	Canada	2	(0)
National sevens team
Years	Team		Comps
- Canada

David James Moonlight (born August 9, 1979) is a Canadian retired rugby union player. He played on the wing for Canada. He made his debut against England at Twickenham on November 13, 2004. Moonlight played his last Test against the United States of America at Edmonton on June 26, 2005. In addition to being fully capped with the national XV squad, David is also one of Canada's greatest sevens internationals. He is the leading points and try scorer for Canada in sevens. Most recently attended the Scotland leg of the IRB World Series. He now works as a teacher in Victoria BC and has two children, Sydney and Michael Moonlight.
