= 2015 Mar del Plata Sevens =

The 2015 Mar del Plata Sevens was the XIX edition of the tournament. Three categories of competition took place on January 10 and 11, 2015: the International Sevens, with national sides and invited selected teams; the men's qualifying tournament for the 2015 Pan American Games in Toronto, Canada, with 2 spots available; and the women's qualifying tournament for 2015 Toronto with 2 spots also available. All matches were played at the Aldovisi club's premises.

== Results ==
=== Men's ===
Team	Pld	W	D	L	PF	PA	PD	Pts
Chile	4	3	1	0	106	17	+89	11
Brazil	4	3	1	0	83	32	+51	11
Paraguay	4	2	0	2	56	48	+8	8
Colombia	4	1	0	3	41	81	–40	6
Peru	4	0	0	4	10	118	–108	4

== See also ==
- Mar del Plata Sevens
- Rugby sevens at the 2015 Pan American Games
