= 2003–04 World Sevens Series =

2003–04 IRB Sevens
- Series V
- Hosts: United Arab Emirates; South Africa; New Zealand; United States; Hong Kong; Singapore; France; England
- Nations: 34

Final positions
- Champions: New Zealand
- Runners-up: England
- Third: Argentina

The 2003–04 Sevens World Series was the fifth edition of the global circuit for men's national rugby sevens teams, organised by the International Rugby Board. The series was held over eight tournaments, an increase of one over the previous year. This was the first year that the USA Sevens was added to the series. New Zealand won its fifth consecutive series, narrowly defeating England.

== Calendar ==
2003–04 Itinerary
Leg	Venue	Dates	Winner
Dubai	Dubai Exiles Rugby Ground, Dubai	4–5 December 2003	South Africa
South Africa	Outeniqua Park, George	12–13 December 2003	England
New Zealand	Westpac Stadium, Wellington	6–7 February 2004	New Zealand
United States	Home Depot Center, Los Angeles	14–15 February 2004	Argentina
Hong Kong	Hong Kong Stadium, Hong Kong	26–28 March 2004	England
Singapore	National Stadium, Singapore	3–4 April 2004	South Africa
Bordeaux	Stade Chaban-Delmas, Bordeaux	28–29 May 2004	New Zealand
London	Twickenham Stadium, London	5–6 June 2004	England

== Final standings ==
The points awarded to teams at each event, as well as the overall season totals, are shown in the table below. Gold indicates the event champions. Silver indicates the event runner-ups. A zero (0) is recorded in the event column where a team played in a tournament but did not gain any points. A dash (–) is recorded in the event column if a team did not compete at a tournament.

2003–04 IRB Sevens – Series V
Pos.	Event Team	Dubai	George	Wellington	Los Angeles	Hong Kong	Singapore	Bordeaux	London	Points total
1	New Zealand	16	16	20	16	18	6	20	16	128
2	England	12	20	12	8	30	4	16	20	122
3	Argentina	8	8	2	20	24	16	8	12	98
4	Fiji	4	12	16	12	8	8	12	12	84
5	South Africa	~~20~~^{a}	~~12~~^{a}	12	4	18	20	12	8	74
6	Samoa	12	4	4	12	8	12	4	4	60
7	France	4	6	4	4	3	12	2	2	37
8	Australia	6	4	0	2	8	4	6	4	34
9	Canada	2	2	0	6	8	0	4	0	22
10	Scotland	–	–	–	–	4	2	0	6	12
11	Kenya	0	0	6	0	2	–	0	0	8
11	Tonga	–	–	8	0	–	–	–	–	8
13	South Korea	–	–	0	0	2	0	–	–	2
14	Cook Islands	–	–	0	–	1	–	–	–	1
—N/a	United States	–	–	0	0	0	0	–	–	0
—N/a	Italy	–	–	–	–	0	–	0	0	0
—N/a	Portugal	–	–	–	–	0	–	0	0	0
—N/a	Georgia	–	–	–	–	0	–	0	0	0
—N/a	Morocco	0	0	–	–	–	–	–	–	0
—N/a	Sri Lanka	0	0	–	–	–	–	–	–	0
—N/a	Uganda	0	0	–	–	–	–	–	–	0
—N/a	Zambia	0	0	–	–	–	–	–	–	0
—N/a	Zimbabwe	0	0	–	–	–	–	–	–	0
—N/a	Namibia	–	0	–	–	0	–	–	–	0
—N/a	Japan	–	–	–	–	0	0	–	–	0
—N/a	Hong Kong	–	–	–	–	0	0	–	–	0
—N/a	Singapore	–	–	–	–	0	0	–	–	0
—N/a	Russia	–	–	–	–	–	–	0	0	0
—N/a	Spain	–	–	–	–	–	–	0	0	0
—N/a	(Cooperation Council for the Arab States of the Gulf) Arabian Gulf	0	–	–	–	–	–	–	–	0
—N/a	Niue	–	–	0	–	–	–	–	–	0
—N/a	Papua New Guinea	–	–	0	–	–	–	–	–	0
—N/a	Chile	–	–	–	0	–	–	–	–	0
—N/a	Uruguay	–	–	–	0	–	–	–	–	0
—N/a	Trinidad and Tobago	–	–	–	0	–	–	–	–	0
—N/a	China	–	–	–	–	0	–	–	–	0
—N/a	Chinese Taipei	–	–	–	–	0	–	–	–	0
—N/a	Thailand	–	–	–	–	0	–	–	–	0
—N/a	Malaysia	–	–	–	–	–	0	–	–	0

Source: rugby7.com (archived)

Legend
Gold	Event Champions
Silver	Event Runner-ups
Light blue line on the left indicates a core team eligible to participate in all events of the series.

Notes:
^^{a} South Africa won the 2003 Dubai Sevens and lost in the Cup Semi-Finals at the 2003 South Africa Sevens but no points are indicated on the IRB Series Standings for 2003-04. South Africa were deducted their points for these rounds for fielding an ineligible player (Tonderai Chavhanga).

== Tournaments ==
=== Dubai ===
Event	Winners	Score	Finalists	Semi-finalists
Cup	~~South Africa~~ ^{a}	33–26	New Zealand	England; Samoa
Plate	Argentina	40–10	Australia	Fiji; France
Bowl	Canada	21–12	Kenya	Morocco; Uganda
Shield	Zambia	59–26	(Cooperation Council for the Arab States of the Gulf) Arabian Gulf	Sri Lanka; Zimbabwe

=== George ===
Event	Winners	Score	Finalists	Semi-finalists
Cup	England	38–14	New Zealand	~~South Africa~~^{a} Fiji
Plate	Argentina	29–12	France	Australia; Samoa
Bowl	Canada	19–14	Namibia	Zambia; Uganda
Shield	Kenya	22–19	Morocco	Sri Lanka; Zimbabwe

=== Wellington ===
Event	Winners	Score	Finalists	Semi-finalists
Cup	New Zealand	33–15	Fiji	England; South Africa
Plate	Tonga	28–12	Kenya	Samoa; France
Bowl	Argentina	31–26	Australia	Canada; South Korea
Shield	United States	43–26	Cook Islands	Papua New Guinea; Niue

=== Los Angeles ===
Event	Winners	Score	Finalists	Semi-finalists
Cup	Argentina	21–12	New Zealand	Fiji; Samoa
Plate	England	55–0	Canada	South Africa; France
Bowl	Australia	33–31	Kenya	Tonga; Chile
Shield	United States	29–22	South Korea	Uruguay; Trinidad and Tobago

=== Hong Kong ===
Event	Winners	Score	Finalists	Semi-finalists	Quarter-finalists
Cup	England	22–12	Argentina	New Zealand; South Africa	Fiji; Australia; Samoa; Canada
Plate	Scotland	28–22	France	Kenya; South Korea	United States; Namibia; Hong Kong; Italy
Bowl	Cook Islands	31–19	Japan	Georgia; Portugal	Chinese Taipei; China; Singapore; Thailand

=== Singapore ===
Event	Winners	Score	Finalists	Semi-finalists
Cup	South Africa	24–19	Argentina	Samoa; France
Plate	Fiji	19–15	New Zealand	England; Australia
Bowl	Scotland	34–5	Canada	Japan; South Korea
Shield	Hong Kong	24–21	United States	Singapore; Malaysia

=== Bordeaux ===
Event	Winners	Score	Finalists	Semi-finalists
Cup	New Zealand	28–19	England	Fiji; South Africa
Plate	Argentina	22–21	Australia	Samoa; Canada
Bowl	France	26–21	Kenya	Scotland; Portugal
Shield	Spain	14–10	Georgia	Russia; Italy

=== London ===
Event	Winners	Score	Finalists	Semi-finalists
Cup	England	22–19	New Zealand	Fiji; Argentina
Plate	South Africa	31–12	Scotland	Australia; Samoa
Bowl	France	19–14	Georgia	Canada; Spain
Shield	Portugal	24–0	Russia	Kenya; Italy
