= 2002–03 IRB Sevens World Series =

Rugby

2002–03 IRB Sevens
- Series IV
- Hosts: United Arab Emirates; South Africa; Australia; New Zealand; Hong Kong; Wales; England
- Nations: 34

Final positions
- Champions: New Zealand
- Runners-up: England
- Third: Fiji

The 2002–03 Sevens World Series was the fourth edition of the global circuit for men's national rugby sevens teams, organised by the International Rugby Board. The season ran from 5th December 2002 to 7th June 2003 and was played out over a series of only seven tournaments. A further three tournaments had originally been scheduled but were cancelled due to concerns about the SARS virus. New Zealand won its fourth consecutive series, with England finishing as runner-up.

== Itinerary ==
2002–03 Itinerary
Leg	Venue	Dates	Winner
Dubai	Dubai Exiles Rugby Ground, Dubai	6–7 December 2002	New Zealand
South Africa	Outeniqua Park, George	13–14 December 2002	Fiji
Brisbane	Ballymore Stadium, Brisbane	2–3 January 2003	England
Wellington	Westpac Stadium, Wellington	7–8 February 2003	New Zealand
Hong Kong	Hong Kong Stadium, Hong Kong	28–30 March 2003	England
Beijing	Chaoyang Stadium, Beijing	5–6 April 2003	Cancelled
Singapore	National Stadium, Singapore	26–27 April 2003	Cancelled
Kuala Lumpur	MBPJ Stadium, Kuala Lumpur	3–4 May 2003	Cancelled
Cardiff	Millennium Stadium, Cardiff	6–7 June 2003	South Africa
London	Twickenham Stadium, London	14–15 June 2003	England

Due to concerns stemming from the spread of respiratory virus SARS, tournaments scheduled for China, Malaysia, and Singapore were cancelled. Further concerns also resulted in two nations — Italy and France — forgoing the opportunity to compete at the Hong Kong Sevens.

== Final standings ==
The points awarded to teams at each event, as well as the overall season totals, are shown in the table below. Gold indicates the event champions. Silver indicates the event runner-ups. A zero (0) is recorded in the event column where a team played in a tournament but did not gain any points. A dash (–) is recorded in the event column if a team did not compete at a tournament.

2002–03 IRB Sevens – Series IV
Pos.	Event Team	Dubai	George	Brisbane	Wellington	Hong Kong	Cardiff	London	Points total
1	New Zealand	20	16	12	20	24	8	12	112
2	England	6	4	20	16	30	12	20	108
3	Fiji	8	20	16	12	18	4	16	94
4	South Africa	12	12	4	4	18	20	12	82
5	Australia	12	12	8	12	8	6	8	66
6	Samoa	16	6	6	8	8	12	2	58
7	Argentina	4	8	4	4	–	16	0	36
8	France	2	0	12	6	–	0	0	20
9	Wales	4	0	–	–	0	4	6	14
10	Kenya	0	4	–	–	8	–	–	12
11	Tonga	–	–	2	0	8	–	–	10
12	Canada	0	0	0	2	4	0	0	6
13	Scotland	–	–	–	–	3	2	0	5
14	Georgia	–	–	–	–	–	–	4	4
15	Italy	0	0	–	–	–	0	4	4
16	South Korea	–	–	–	–	2	–	–	2
17	Cook Islands	–	–	0	0	2	–	–	2
18	Namibia	0	2	–	–	0	–	–	2
19	United States	–	–	0	0	1	–	–	1

Source: rugby7.com (archived)

Legend
Gold	Event Champions
Silver	Event Runner-ups
Light blue line on the left indicates a core team eligible to participate in all events of the series.

== Tournaments ==
=== Dubai ===
Event	Winners	Score	Finalists	Semi-finalists
Cup	New Zealand	36–0	Samoa	South Africa; Australia
Plate	Fiji	29–5	England	Argentina; Wales
Bowl	France	17–7	Canada	Kenya; Italy
Shield	Morocco	31–22	Namibia	(Cooperation Council for the Arab States of the Gulf) Arabian Gulf; Sri Lanka

=== George ===
Event	Winners	Score	Finalists	Semi-finalists
Cup	Fiji	24–14	New Zealand	South Africa; Australia
Plate	Argentina	27–7	Samoa	England; Kenya
Bowl	Namibia	22–21	France	Wales; Canada
Shield	Italy	43–17	Zambia	Morocco (Cooperation Council for the Arab States of the Gulf) Arabian Gulf

=== Brisbane ===
Event	Winners	Score	Finalists	Semi-finalists
Cup	England	28–14	Fiji	New Zealand; France
Plate	Australia	47–12	Samoa	South Africa; Argentina
Bowl	Tonga	29–10	United States	Canada; Niue
Shield	Cook Islands	29–14	Papua New Guinea	Japan; China

=== Wellington ===
Event	Winners	Score	Finalists	Semi-finalists
Cup	New Zealand	38–26	England	Fiji; Australia
Plate	Samoa	39–5	France	South Africa; Argentina
Bowl	Canada	47–5	Niue	United States; Cook Islands
Shield	Tonga	29–26	Japan	Papua New Guinea; China

=== Hong Kong ===
Event	Winners	Score	Finalists	Semi-finalists	Quarter-finalists
Cup	England	22–17	New Zealand	Fiji; South Africa	Australia; Samoa; Kenya; Tonga
Plate	Canada	19–14	Scotland	Cook Islands; South Korea	Wales; Namibia; Chinese Taipei; Hong Kong
Bowl	United States	24–19	Japan	China; Russia	Sri Lanka; Singapore; Malaysia; Netherlands

=== Cardiff ===
Event	Winners	Score	Finalists	Semi-finalists
Cup	South Africa	35–17	Argentina	England; Samoa
Plate	New Zealand	34–14	Australia	Fiji; Wales
Bowl	Scotland	35–14	France	Canada; Russia
Shield	Georgia	24–12	Italy	Portugal; Spain

=== London ===
Event	Winners	Score	Finalists	Semi-finalists
Cup	England	31–14	Fiji	New Zealand; South Africa
Plate	Australia	40–14	Wales	Georgia; Italy
Bowl	Samoa	44–5	France	Scotland; Portugal
Shield	Argentina	36–12	Canada	Russia; Spain
