= Mike Danskin =

Canada international rugby union player

- Full name: Michael Buchanan Danskin
- Born: June 14, 1980 (age 46) Victoria, BC, Canada
- Height: 5 ft 11 in (180 cm)
- Weight: 185 lb (84 kg)
- School: St. Michaels University School
- University: University of Victoria

Rugby union career
- Position: Fly-half
International career
Years	Team	Apps	(Points)
2001–04	Canada	3	(8)
National sevens team
Years	Team		Comps
2001–06	Canada		

Michael Buchanan Danskin (born June 14, 1980) is a Canadian former international rugby union player.

== Biography ==
Raised in Victoria, British Columbia, Danskin attended St. Michael's University School and the University of Victoria, where he was twice named "Outstanding Athlete of the Year" playing varsity rugby.

Danskin played his rugby as a fly-half and had a strong kicking game, aided by tuition received from Canadian Football Hall of Fame place kicker Dave Cutler, who is a family friend.

A rugby sevens specialist, Danskin debuted for Canada at the 2001 World Games and scored 480 points during his World Sevens Series career. He was capped three times with the Canada XV between 2001 and 2004.

== See also ==
- List of Canada national rugby union players
