= 2004 Hong Kong Sevens =

Rugby sevens event in Hong Kong

- IRB Sevens V
- Host nation: Hong Kong
- Date: 26–28 March 2004

Cup
- Champion: England
- Runner-up: Argentina

Plate
- Winner: Scotland
- Runner-up: France

Bowl
- Winner: Cook Islands
- Runner-up: Japan

Tournament details
- Matches played: 45

The 2004 Hong Kong Sevens was an international rugby sevens tournament that took place at the Hong Kong Stadium between 26 and 28 March 2004. It was the 29th edition of the Hong Kong Sevens and was the fifth tournament of the 2003–04 World Sevens Series. Twenty-four teams competed in the tournament and were separated into six groups of four with the top eight teams qualifying through to the cup tournament.

After winning all three of their group stage matches, England took out the Hong Kong title for the third year running, defeating Argentina in the cup final 22–12. The plate-final saw Scotland defeat France while the Cook Islands took home the bowl defeating Japan.

== Teams ==
Compared to other tournament of the series, the Hong Kong Sevens had 24 teams compete for the title instead of the regular sixteen teams that usually competed in a World Series event.

- Argentina
- Australia
- Canada
- China
- Chinese Taipei
- Cook Islands
- England
- Fiji
- France
- Georgia
- Hong Kong
- Italy
- Japan
- Kenya
- Namibia
- New Zealand
- Portugal
- Samoa
- Scotland
- Singapore
- South Africa
- South Korea
- Thailand
- United States

== Format ==
The teams were drawn into six pools of four teams each. Each team played the other teams in their pool once, with three points awarded for a win, two points for a draw, and one point for a loss (no points awarded for a forfeit). The pool stage was played over the first two days of the tournament. The top team from each pool along with the two best runners-up advanced to the Cup quarter finals. The remaining four runners-up along with the four best third-placed teams advanced to the Plate quarter finals. The remaining eight teams went on to the Bowl quarter finals.

== Pool stage ==
Key to colours in group tables
Teams that advanced to the Cup quarterfinals
Teams that advanced to the Plate quarterfinals
Teams that advanced to the Bowl quarterfinals

=== Pool A ===
Pos	Team	Pld	W	D	L	PF	PA	PD	Pts
1	New Zealand	3	3	0	0	138	7	+131	9
2	United States	3	2	0	1	44	55	−11	7
3	Italy	3	1	0	2	38	81	−43	5
4	Japan	3	0	0	3	31	108	−77	3

26 March
17:00

New Zealand	48–0	Japan

Hong Kong Stadium, Hong Kong

26 March
19:12

United States	10–5	Italy

Hong Kong Stadium, Hong Kong

27 March
10:46

Italy	33–19	Japan

Hong Kong Stadium, Hong Kong

27 March
12:58

New Zealand	38–7	United States

Hong Kong Stadium, Hong Kong

27 March
15:10

United States	27–12	Japan

Hong Kong Stadium, Hong Kong

27 March
17:22

New Zealand	52–0	Italy

Hong Kong Stadium, Hong Kong

=== Pool B ===
Pos	Team	Pld	W	D	L	PF	PA	PD	Pts
1	England	3	3	0	0	129	12	+117	9
2	Scotland	3	2	0	1	74	50	+24	7
3	Georgia	3	1	0	2	22	85	−63	5
4	China	3	0	0	3	29	107	−78	3

26 March
17:22

England	49–0	China

Hong Kong Stadium, Hong Kong

26 March
19:34

Scotland	26–0	Georgia

Hong Kong Stadium, Hong Kong

27 March
11:08

Georgia	22–17	China

Hong Kong Stadium, Hong Kong

27 March
13:20

England	38–12	Scotland

Hong Kong Stadium, Hong Kong

27 March
15:32

Scotland	36–12	China

Hong Kong Stadium, Hong Kong

27 March
17:44

England	42–0	Georgia

Hong Kong Stadium, Hong Kong

=== Pool C ===
Pos	Team	Pld	W	D	L	PF	PA	PD	Pts
1	South Africa	3	3	0	0	132	24	+108	9
2	Kenya	3	2	0	1	69	29	+40	7
3	Cook Islands	3	1	0	2	43	88	−45	5
4	Thailand	3	0	0	3	29	132	−103	3

26 March
17:44

South Africa	63–0	Thailand

Hong Kong Stadium, Hong Kong

26 March
19:56

Kenya	19–0	Cook Islands

Hong Kong Stadium, Hong Kong

27 March
11:30

Kenya	38–5	Thailand

Hong Kong Stadium, Hong Kong

27 March
13:42

South Africa	45–12	Cook Islands

Hong Kong Stadium, Hong Kong

27 March
15:54

Cook Islands	31–24	Thailand

Hong Kong Stadium, Hong Kong

27 March
18:06

South Africa	24–12	Kenya

Hong Kong Stadium, Hong Kong

=== Pool D ===
Pos	Team	Pld	W	D	L	PF	PA	PD	Pts
1	Canada	3	3	0	0	87	12	+75	9
2	Fiji	3	2	0	1	78	14	+64	7
3	Hong Kong	3	1	0	2	21	64	−43	5
4	Portugal	3	0	0	3	12	108	−96	3

26 March
18:06

Fiji	35–0	Portugal

Hong Kong Stadium, Hong Kong

26 March
20:18

Canada	21–0	Hong Kong

Hong Kong Stadium, Hong Kong

27 March
11:52

Canada	52–0	Portugal

Hong Kong Stadium, Hong Kong

27 March
14:04

Fiji	31–0	Hong Kong

Hong Kong Stadium, Hong Kong

27 March
16:16

Hong Kong	21–12	Portugal

Hong Kong Stadium, Hong Kong

27 March
18:28

Canada	14–12	Fiji

Hong Kong Stadium, Hong Kong

=== Pool E ===
Pos	Team	Pld	W	D	L	PF	PA	PD	Pts
1	Argentina	3	3	0	0	91	7	+84	9
2	France	3	2	0	1	67	19	+48	7
3	South Korea	3	1	0	2	59	55	+4	5
4	Singapore	3	0	0	3	5	141	−136	3

26 March
18:28

Argentina	48–0	Singapore

Hong Kong Stadium, Hong Kong

26 March
20:40

France	19–7	South Korea

Hong Kong Stadium, Hong Kong

27 March
12:14

France	48–0	Singapore

Hong Kong Stadium, Hong Kong

27 March
14:26

Argentina	31–7	South Korea

Hong Kong Stadium, Hong Kong

27 March
16:38

South Korea	45–5	Singapore

Hong Kong Stadium, Hong Kong

27 March
18:50

Argentina	12–0	France

Hong Kong Stadium, Hong Kong

=== Pool F ===
Pos	Team	Pld	W	D	L	PF	PA	PD	Pts
1	Australia	3	3	0	0	118	24	+94	9
2	Samoa	3	2	0	1	81	19	+62	7
3	Namibia	3	1	0	2	45	90	−45	5
4	Chinese Taipei	3	0	0	3	28	139	−111	3

26 March
18:50

Samoa	38–0	Chinese Taipei

Hong Kong Stadium, Hong Kong

26 March
21:02

Australia	31–12	Namibia

Hong Kong Stadium, Hong Kong

27 March
12:36

Australia	68–0	Chinese Taipei

Hong Kong Stadium, Hong Kong

27 March
14:48

Samoa	31–0	Namibia

Hong Kong Stadium, Hong Kong

27 March
17:00

Namibia	33–28	Chinese Taipei

Hong Kong Stadium, Hong Kong

27 March
19:12

Australia	19–12	Samoa

Hong Kong Stadium, Hong Kong

== Knockout stage ==
=== Bowl ===
Quarter-finals
28 March – Hong Kong Stadium
Cook Islands	46
Singapore	0
28 March – Hong Kong Stadium
Portugal	26
China	12
28 March – Hong Kong Stadium
Japan	31
Thailand	10
28 March – Hong Kong Stadium
Chinese Taipei	17
Georgia	19

Semi-finals
28 March – Hong Kong Stadium
Cook Islands	21
Portugal	5
28 March – Hong Kong Stadium
Japan	26
Georgia	21

Final
28 March – Hong Kong Stadium
Cook Islands	31
Japan	19

Source: HK Sevens

=== Plate ===
Quarter-finals
28 March – Hong Kong Stadium
France	31
Namibia	5
28 March – Hong Kong Stadium
South Korea	14
United States	12
28 March – Hong Kong Stadium
Scotland	20
Italy	17
28 March – Hong Kong Stadium
Hong Kong	0
Kenya	21

Semi-finals
28 March – Hong Kong Stadium
France	21
South Korea	7
28 March – Hong Kong Stadium
Scotland	19
Kenya	7

Final
28 March – Hong Kong Stadium
France	22
Scotland	28

Source: HK Sevens

=== Cup ===
Quarter-finals
28 March – Hong Kong Stadium
New Zealand	27
Samoa	5
28 March – Hong Kong Stadium
Argentina	19
Canada	14
28 March – Hong Kong Stadium
South Africa	17
Australia	5
28 March – Hong Kong Stadium
Fiji	12
England	17

Semi-finals
28 March – Hong Kong Stadium
New Zealand	17
Argentina	19
28 March – Hong Kong Stadium
South Africa	7
England	15

Final
28 March – Hong Kong Stadium
Argentina	12
England	22

Source: HK Sevens

== Tournament placings ==
Place	Team	Points
1st place, gold medalist(s)	England	30
2nd place, silver medalist(s)	Argentina	24
3rd place, bronze medalist(s)	New Zealand	18
3rd place, bronze medalist(s)	South Africa	18
5	Australia	8
5	Canada	8
5	Fiji	8
5	Samoa	8
9	Scotland	4
10	France	3
11	Kenya	2
11	South Korea	2

Place	Team	Points
13	Hong Kong	0
13	Italy	0
13	Namibia	0
13	United States	0
17	Cook Islands	1
18	Japan	0
19	Georgia	0
19	Portugal	0
21	China	0
21	Chinese Taipei	0
21	Singapore	0
21	Thailand	0

Source: Rugby7.com

IRB Sevens V
Preceded by 2004 USA Sevens	2004 Hong Kong Sevens	Succeeded by 2004 Singapore Sevens
Hong Kong Sevens
Preceded by 2003 Hong Kong Sevens	2004 Hong Kong Sevens	Succeeded by 2006 Hong Kong Sevens
