= 2003 Hong Kong Sevens =

International rugby sevens tournament

- IRB Sevens IV
- Host nation: Hong Kong
- Date: 28–30 March 2003

Cup
- Champion: England
- Runner-up: New Zealand

Plate
- Winner: Canada
- Runner-up: Scotland

Bowl
- Winner: United States
- Runner-up: Japan

Tournament details
- Matches played: 45

The 2003 Hong Kong Sevens was an international rugby sevens tournament that took place at the Hong Kong Stadium between 28 and 30 March 2003. It was the 28th edition of the Hong Kong Sevens and was the fifth tournament of the 2002–03 IRB Sevens World Series. Twenty-four teams competed in the tournament and were separated into six groups of four with the top eight teams qualifying through to the cup tournament.

Due to the SARS outbreak that was occurring in Hong Kong, some teams delayed their arrival to the country with three teams (Argentina, France and Italy withdrawing from the competition.

England defended their Hong Kong title that they won the previous year defeating New Zealand in the final by a score of 22–17. The plate-final saw Canada defeat Scotland while the United States took home the bowl defeating Japan.

== Teams ==
Compared to other tournament of the series, the Hong Kong Sevens had 24 teams compete for the title instead of the regular sixteen teams that usually competed in a World Series event. The tournament saw three teams withdraw after the official draw was revealed on February 27 due to the SARS outbreak that was occurring in South-East Asia. On March 21, France and Italy withdrew from the competition with Argentina withdrawing two days later. They were replaced by Namibia, Tonga and the Netherlands respectively. Other teams delayed their arrivals to Hong Kong with Fiji and New Zealand only arriving three days before the tournament started.

- Australia
- Canada
- China
- Cook Islands
- Chinese Taipei
- England
- Fiji
- Hong Kong
- Japan
- Kenya
- Malaysia
- Namibia
- Netherlands
- New Zealand
- Russia
- Samoa
- Scotland
- Singapore
- South Africa
- South Korea
- Sri Lanka
- Tonga
- United States
- Wales

== Format ==
The teams were drawn into six pools of four teams each. Each team played the other teams in their pool once, with three points awarded for a win, two points for a draw, and one point for a loss (no points awarded for a forfeit). The pool stage was played over the first two days of the tournament. The top team from each pool along with the two best runners-up advanced to the Cup quarter finals. The remaining four runners-up along with the four best third-placed teams advanced to the Plate quarter finals. The remaining eight teams went on to the Bowl quarter finals.

== Pool stage ==
The draw for the 2003 Hong Kong Sevens was held on 27 February 2003 with the revised draw occurring on the 25 March.

Key to colours in group tables
Teams that advanced to the Cup quarterfinals
Teams that advanced to the Plate quarterfinals
Teams that advanced to the Bowl quarterfinals

Pos	Team	Pld	W	D	L	PF	PA	PD	Pts
1	New Zealand	3	3	0	0	141	10	+131	9
2	Namibia	3	2	0	1	70	66	+4	7
3	United States	3	1	0	2	62	97	−35	5
4	Malaysia	3	0	0	3	18	118	−100	3

Source: HK Sevens

28 March
17:00

New Zealand	38–3	Malaysia

Hong Kong Stadium, Hong Kong

28 March
19:12

Namibia	35–10	United States

Hong Kong Stadium, Hong Kong

29 March
10:46

Namibia	35–10	Malaysia

Hong Kong Stadium, Hong Kong

29 March
12:58

New Zealand	57–7	United States

Hong Kong Stadium, Hong Kong

29 March
15:10

United States	45–5	Malaysia

Hong Kong Stadium, Hong Kong

29 March
17:22

New Zealand	46–0	Namibia

Hong Kong Stadium, Hong Kong

Source: HK Sevens

=== Pool B ===
Pos	Team	Pld	W	D	L	PF	PA	PD	Pts
1	England	3	3	0	0	137	12	+125	9
2	Tonga	3	2	0	1	83	59	+24	7
3	Chinese Taipei	3	1	0	2	57	81	−24	5
4	Singapore	3	0	0	3	12	137	−125	3

Source: HK Sevens

28 March
17:22

England	52–0	Singapore

Hong Kong Stadium, Hong Kong

28 March
19:34

Tonga	26–17	Chinese Taipei

Hong Kong Stadium, Hong Kong

29 March
11:08

Tonga	50–0	Singapore

Hong Kong Stadium, Hong Kong

29 March
13:20

England	43–5	Chinese Taipei

Hong Kong Stadium, Hong Kong

29 March
15:32

Chinese Taipei	35–12	Singapore

Hong Kong Stadium, Hong Kong

29 March
17:44

England	42–7	Tonga

Hong Kong Stadium, Hong Kong

Source: HK Sevens

=== Pool C ===
Pos	Team	Pld	W	D	L	PF	PA	PD	Pts
1	Fiji	3	3	0	0	125	24	+101	9
2	Canada	3	2	0	1	57	64	−7	7
3	Japan	3	1	0	2	47	97	−50	5
4	Russia	3	0	0	3	38	82	−44	3

Source: HK Sevens

28 March
17:44

Fiji	33–5	Russia

Hong Kong Stadium, Hong Kong

28 March
19:56

Canada	24–12	Japan

Hong Kong Stadium, Hong Kong

29 March
11:30

Canada	21–19	Russia

Hong Kong Stadium, Hong Kong

29 March
13:42

Fiji	59–7	Japan

Hong Kong Stadium, Hong Kong

29 March
15:54

Japan	28–14	Russia

Hong Kong Stadium, Hong Kong

29 March
18:06

Fiji	33–12	Canada

Hong Kong Stadium, Hong Kong

Source: HK Sevens

=== Pool D ===
Pos	Team	Pld	W	D	L	PF	PA	PD	Pts
1	Kenya	3	3	0	0	61	29	+32	9
2	Australia	3	2	0	1	78	29	+49	7
3	Hong Kong	3	1	0	2	43	48	−5	5
4	China	3	0	0	3	21	97	−76	3

Source: HK Sevens

28 March
18:06

Australia	40–7	China

Hong Kong Stadium, Hong Kong

28 March
20:18

Kenya	15–10	Hong Kong

Hong Kong Stadium, Hong Kong

29 March
11:52

Kenya	31–7	China

Hong Kong Stadium, Hong Kong

29 March
14:04

Australia	26–7	Hong Kong

Hong Kong Stadium, Hong Kong

29 March
16:16

Hong Kong	26–7	China

Hong Kong Stadium, Hong Kong

29 March
18:28

Kenya	15–12	Australia

Hong Kong Stadium, Hong Kong

Source: HK Sevens

=== Pool E ===
Pos	Team	Pld	W	D	L	PF	PA	PD	Pts
1	South Africa	3	3	0	0	132	7	+125	9
2	Scotland	3	2	0	1	66	43	+23	7
3	South Korea	3	1	0	2	69	75	−6	5
4	Sri Lanka	3	0	0	3	0	142	−142	3

Source: HK Sevens

28 March
18:28

South Africa	54–0	Sri Lanka

Hong Kong Stadium, Hong Kong

28 March
20:40

Scotland	28–12	South Korea

Hong Kong Stadium, Hong Kong

29 March
12:14

Scotland	38–0	Sri Lanka

Hong Kong Stadium, Hong Kong

29 March
14:26

South Africa	47–7	South Korea

Hong Kong Stadium, Hong Kong

29 March
16:38

South Korea	50–0	Sri Lanka

Hong Kong Stadium, Hong Kong

29 March
18:50

South Africa	31–0	Scotland

Hong Kong Stadium, Hong Kong

Source: HK Sevens

=== Pool F ===
Pos	Team	Pld	W	D	L	PF	PA	PD	Pts
1	Samoa	3	3	0	0	112	24	+88	9
2	Cook Islands	3	1	1	1	72	38	+34	6
3	Wales	3	1	1	1	55	65	−10	6
4	Netherlands	3	0	0	3	19	131	−112	3

Source: HK Sevens

28 March
18:50

Samoa	41–7	Netherlands

Hong Kong Stadium, Hong Kong

28 March
21:02

Wales	10–10	Cook Islands

Hong Kong Stadium, Hong Kong

29 March
12:36

Wales	40–12	Netherlands

Hong Kong Stadium, Hong Kong

29 March
14:48

Samoa	28–12	Cook Islands

Hong Kong Stadium, Hong Kong

29 March
17:00

Cook Islands	50–0	Netherlands

Hong Kong Stadium, Hong Kong

29 March
19:12

Samoa	43–5	Wales

Hong Kong Stadium, Hong Kong

Source: HK Sevens

== Knockout stage ==
=== Bowl ===
Quarter-finals
30 March – Hong Kong Stadium
United States	39
Sri Lanka	7
30 March – Hong Kong Stadium
Malaysia	7
China	12
30 March – Hong Kong Stadium
Russia	24
Netherlands	12
30 March – Hong Kong Stadium
Singapore	0
Japan	41

Semi-finals
30 March – Hong Kong Stadium
United States	31
China	0
30 March – Hong Kong Stadium
Russia	12
Japan	19

Final
30 March – Hong Kong Stadium
United States	24
Japan	19

Source: HK Sevens

=== Plate ===
Quarter-finals
30 March – Hong Kong Stadium
Scotland	49
Chinese Taipei	5
30 March – Hong Kong Stadium
Wales	19
Cook Islands	24
30 March – Hong Kong Stadium
Canada	24
Hong Kong	0
30 March – Hong Kong Stadium
South Korea	24
Namibia	21

Semi-finals
30 March – Hong Kong Stadium
Scotland	24
Cook Islands	5
30 March – Hong Kong Stadium
Canada	33
South Korea	10

Final
30 March – Hong Kong Stadium
Scotland	14
Canada	19

Source: HK Sevens

=== Cup ===
Quarter-finals
30 March – Hong Kong Stadium
New Zealand	31
Tonga	5
30 March – Hong Kong Stadium
South Africa	40
Kenya	0
30 March – Hong Kong Stadium
Fiji	12
Samoa	7
30 March – Hong Kong Stadium
Australia	14
England	19

Semi-finals
30 March – Hong Kong Stadium
New Zealand	21
South Africa	17
30 March – Hong Kong Stadium
Fiji	19
England	24

Final
30 March – Hong Kong Stadium
New Zealand	17
England	22

Source: HK Sevens

== Tournament placings ==
Place	Team	Points
1st place, gold medalist(s)	England	30
2nd place, silver medalist(s)	New Zealand	24
3rd place, bronze medalist(s)	Fiji	18
3rd place, bronze medalist(s)	South Africa	18
5	Australia	8
5	Kenya	8
5	Samoa	8
5	Tonga	8
9	Canada	4
10	Scotland	3
11	Cook Islands	2
11	South Korea	2

Place	Team	Points
13	Chinese Taipei	0
13	Hong Kong	0
13	Namibia	0
13	Wales	0
17	United States	1
18	Japan	0
19	China	0
19	Russia	0
21	Malaysia	0
21	Netherlands	0
21	Singapore	0
21	Sri Lanka	0

Source: Rugby7.com

IRB Sevens IV
Preceded by 2003 Wellington Sevens	2003 Hong Kong Sevens	Succeeded by 2003 Cardiff Sevens
Hong Kong Sevens
Preceded by 2002 Hong Kong Sevens	2003 Hong Kong Sevens	Succeeded by 2004 Hong Kong Sevens
