= 2001 South Africa Sevens =

- IRB Sevens III
- Host nation: South Africa
- Date: 17–18 November 2001

Cup
- Champion: New Zealand
- Runner-up: Samoa

Plate
- Winner: Australia
- Runner-up: Fiji

Bowl
- Winner: Namibia
- Runner-up: Wales

Shield
- Winner: Kenya
- Runner-up: Morocco

Tournament details
- Matches played: 41

The 2001 South Africa Sevens (more commonly known as the 2001 Durban Sevens) was a rugby sevens tournament held at the Absa Stadium in Durban. The tournament took place from 17–18 November 2001 and was the third edition of the South Africa Sevens and was also the first leg of the 2001–02 World Sevens Series.

Sixteen teams were separated into four groups of four with the top two teams qualifying through to the cup final while the bottom two competed in the bowl. After finishing top of their group, New Zealand went on to defend their title defeating first-time cup finalists Samoa 19–17. In the plate final, Australia defeated Fiji 57–0 while the African teams in Namibia and Kenya won the bowl and the newly created shield competition.

== Format ==
The teams were drawn into four pools of four teams each. Each team played the other teams in their pool once, with 3 points awarded for a win, 2 points for a draw, and 1 point for a loss (no points awarded for a forfeit). The pool stage was played on the first day of the tournament. The top two teams from each pool advanced to the Cup/Plate brackets. The bottom two teams from each pool went on to the Bowl bracket.

== Teams ==
Arabian Gulf made their first appearance in the IRB Sevens World Series as they were one of the 16 participating teams for the tournament:

- (Cooperation Council for the Arab States of the Gulf) Arabian Gulf
- Argentina
- Australia
- England
- Fiji
- France
- Georgia
- Kenya
- Morocco
- Namibia
- New Zealand
- Portugal
- Samoa
- Scotland
- South Africa
- Wales

== Pool stage ==
The pool stage was played on the first day of the tournament. The 16 teams were separated into four pools of four teams and teams in the same pool played each other once. The top two teams in each pool advanced to the Cup quarterfinals to compete for the 2001 Durban Sevens title.

Key to colours in group tables
Teams that advanced to the Cup quarterfinals
Teams that advanced to the Bowl quarterfinals

=== Pool A ===
Pos	Team	Pld	W	D	L	PF	PA	PD	Pts
1	New Zealand	3	3	0	0	131	0	+131	9
2	England	3	2	0	1	71	42	+29	7
3	(Cooperation Council for the Arab States of the Gulf) Arabian Gulf	3	1	0	2	21	102	−81	5
4	Georgia	3	0	0	3	5	84	−79	3

17 October 2001

New Zealand	45-0	Georgia

ABSA Stadium, Durban

17 October 2001

England	39–14	(Cooperation Council for the Arab States of the Gulf) Arabian Gulf

ABSA Stadium, Durban

17 October 2001

New Zealand	58–0	(Cooperation Council for the Arab States of the Gulf) Arabian Gulf

ABSA Stadium, Durban

17 October 2001

England	32–0	Georgia

ABSA Stadium, Durban

17 October 2001

New Zealand	28–0	England

ABSA Stadium, Durban

17 October 2001

Arabian Gulf (Cooperation Council for the Arab States of the Gulf)	7–5	Georgia

ABSA Stadium, Durban

=== Pool B ===
Pos	Team	Pld	W	D	L	PF	PA	PD	Pts
1	Australia	3	3	0	0	79	22	+57	9
2	France	3	2	0	1	60	27	+33	7
3	Wales	3	1	0	2	34	42	−8	5
4	Namibia	3	0	0	3	10	92	−82	3

17 October 2001

Wales	14-10	Namibia

ABSA Stadium, Durban

17 October 2011

Australia	17–12	France

ABSA Stadium, Durban

17 October 2001

Australia	50–0	Namibia

ABSA Stadium, Durban

17 October 2001

France	20–10	Wales

ABSA Stadium, Durban

17 October 2001

France	28–0	Namibia

ABSA Stadium, Durban

17 October 2001

Australia	12–10	Wales

ABSA Stadium, Durban

=== Pool C ===
Pos	Team	Pld	W	D	L	PF	PA	PD	Pts
1	Argentina	3	3	0	0	88	14	+74	9
2	Fiji	3	2	0	1	71	40	+31	7
3	Scotland	3	1	0	2	27	71	−44	5
4	Morocco	3	0	0	3	23	84	−61	3

17 October 2001

Fiji	26-5	Scotland

ABSA Stadium, Durban

17 October 2001

Argentina	24–7	Morocco

ABSA Stadium, Durban

17 October 2001

Fiji	38–9	Morocco

ABSA Stadium, Durban

17 October 2001

Argentina	38–0	Scotland

ABSA Stadium, Durban

17 October 2001

Scotland	22–7	Morocco

ABSA Stadium, Durban

17 October 2001

Argentina	26–7	Fiji

ABSA Stadium, Durban

=== Pool D ===
Pos	Team	Pld	W	D	L	PF	PA	PD	Pts
1	South Africa	3	2	1	0	90	22	+68	8
2	Samoa	3	2	1	0	81	29	+52	8
3	Portugal	3	1	0	2	45	83	−38	5
4	Kenya	3	0	0	3	29	111	−82	3

17 October 2001

Samoa	31-7	Portugal

ABSA Stadium, Durban

17 October 2001

South Africa	45–0	Kenya

ABSA Stadium, Durban

17 October 2001

Samoa	38–10	Kenya

ABSA Stadium, Durban

17 October 2001

South Africa	33–10	Portugal

ABSA Stadium, Durban

17 October 2001

Portugal	28–19	Kenya

ABSA Stadium, Durban

17 October 2001

Samoa	12–12	South Africa

ABSA Stadium, Durban

== Knockout stage ==
=== Shield ===
Semi-finals
18 November 2001 – ABSA Stadium, Durban
(Cooperation Council for the Arab States of the Gulf) Arabian Gulf	12
Morocco	21
18 November 2001 – ABSA Stadium, Durban
Kenya	17
Georgia	7

Final
18 November 2001 – ABSA Stadium, Durban
Morocco	17
Kenya	20

=== Bowl ===
Quarter-finals
18 November 2001 – ABSA Stadium, Durban
(Cooperation Council for the Arab States of the Gulf) Arabian Gulf	19
Namibia	22
18 November 2001 – ABSA Stadium, Durban
Portugal	22
Morocco	0
18 November 2001 – ABSA Stadium, Durban
Scotland	28
Kenya	19
18 November 2001 – ABSA Stadium, Durban
Wales	40
Georgia	19

Semi-finals
18 November 2001 – ABSA Stadium, Durban
Namibia	22
Portugal	12
18 November 2001 – ABSA Stadium, Durban
Scotland	12
Wales	29

Final
18 November 2001 – ABSA Stadium, Durban
Namibia	29
Wales	28

=== Plate ===
Semi-finals
18 November 2001 – ABSA Stadium, Durban
France	14
Fiji	28
18 November 2001 – ABSA Stadium, Durban
Argentina	12
Australia	14

Final
18 November 2001 – ABSA Stadium, Durban
Fiji	0
Australia	57

=== Cup ===
Quarter-finals
18 November 2001 – ABSA Stadium, Durban
New Zealand	26
France	0
18 November 2001 – ABSA Stadium, Durban
South Africa	12
Fiji	0
18 November 2001 – ABSA Stadium, Durban
Argentina	14
Samoa	19
18 November 2001 – ABSA Stadium, Durban
Australia	7
England	27

Semi-finals
18 November 2001 – ABSA Stadium, Durban
New Zealand	38
South Africa	7
18 November 2001 – ABSA Stadium, Durban
Samoa	24
England	7

Final
18 November 2001 – ABSA Stadium, Durban
New Zealand	19
Samoa	17

== Tournament placings ==
Place	Team	Points
1st place, gold medalist(s)	New Zealand	20
2nd place, silver medalist(s)	Samoa	16
3rd place, bronze medalist(s)	South Africa	12
3rd place, bronze medalist(s)	England	12
5	Australia	8
6	Fiji	6
7	Argentina	4
7	France	4

Place	Team	Points
9	Namibia	2
10	Wales	0
11	Scotland	0
11	Portugal	0
13	Kenya	0
14	Morocco	0
15	Georgia	0
15	(Cooperation Council for the Arab States of the Gulf) Arabian Gulf	0

Source: Rugby7.com

IRB Sevens III
Preceded by First	2001 South Africa Sevens Sevens	Succeeded by 2002 Chile Sevens
South Africa Sevens
Preceded by 2000 Durban Sevens	2001 South Africa Sevens	Succeeded by 2002 South Africa Sevens
