= 2026 SVNS 2 =

Rugby sevens competition

- Hosts: Kenya; Uruguay; Brazil

The 2026 SVNS 2 is the first season of the SVNS 2, the second-tier global rugby sevens competition for national teams.

The series will comprise three tournaments in Kenya, Uruguay and Brazil. The top four teams in aggregate points will advance to the SVNS World Championship.

== Teams and format ==
The promotion top two from SVNS 3:South Africa, Argentina (W) and Belgium,Canada (M).

=== Men's teams ===
- Belgium
- Canada
- Germany
- Kenya
- United States
- Uruguay

=== Women's teams ===
- Argentina
- Brazil
- China
- Kenya
- South Africa
- Spain

== Tour venues ==
2026 SVNS 2 itinerary
Leg	Stadium	City	Dates	Men's Winner	Women's Winner
Kenya	Nyayo National Stadium	Nairobi	14–15 February	Germany	Argentina
Uruguay	Estadio Charrúa	Montevideo	21–22 March	United States	Argentina
Brazil	Estádio Nicolau Alayon	São Paulo	28–29 March	Belgium	Brazil

== Standings ==
The points awarded to teams at each event, as well as the overall season totals, are shown in the table below. Gold indicates the event champions. Silver indicates the event runner-ups. Bronze indicates the event third place finishers. An asterisk (*) indicates a tied placing. A dash (—) is recorded where a team did not compete.

=== Men's ===
2026 SVNS 2
Pos.	Event Team	Nairobi	Montevideo	São Paulo	Points total	Points difference
1	United States	18	20	14	52	151
2	Kenya	16	16	18	50	180
3	Germany	20	18	10	48	-58
4	Uruguay	14	14	16	44	58
5	Belgium	12	10	20	42	−188
6	Canada	10	12	12	34	−184

Legend
Gold	Event Champions
Silver	Event Runner-ups
Bronze	Event Third place finishers
Green	Qualified for the SVNS World Championship

=== Women's ===
2026 SVNS 2
Pos.	Event Team	Nairobi	Montevideo	São Paulo	Points total	Points difference
1	Argentina	20	20	14	54	41
2	Spain	16	18	16	50	51
3	South Africa	18	16	12	46	81
4	Brazil	10	12	20	42	−7
5	Kenya	12	10	18	40	–23
6	China	14	14	10	38	−144

Legend
Gold	Event Champions
Silver	Event Runner-ups
Bronze	Event Third place finishers
Green	Qualified for the SVNS World Championship

== Placings summary ==
Tallies of top-four placings in tournaments during the 2026 SVNS 2, by team:

=== Men ===
Team	(gold) Gold	(silver) Silver	(bronze) Bronze	Fourth	Total
United States	1	1		1	3
Kenya		1	2		3
Uruguay			1	2	3
Germany	1	1			2
Belgium	1				1

=== Women ===
Team	(gold) Gold	(silver) Silver	(bronze) Bronze	Fourth	Total
Argentina	2			1	3
Spain		1	2		3
South Africa		1	1		2
China				2	2
Brazil	1				1
Kenya		1			1

== Players ==
Player of the final award
Tour Leg	Men's Winner	Women's Winner	Ref.
2026 Kenya SVNS 2	George Ooro	Sofía González	
2026 Uruguay SVNS 2	Will Chevalier	Maria Brigido	
2026 Brazil SVNS 2	Ryan Godsmark	Thalia Costa	
