= Canada national rugby sevens team =

Canada
- Union: Rugby Canada
- Emblem: The Maple Leaf
- Coach: Sean White
- Most caps: Nathan Hirayama (363)
- Top scorer: Nathan Hirayama (1,859)
- Most tries: Nathan Hirayama (147)
Team kit	Change kit

World Cup Sevens
- Appearances: 8 (First in 1993)
- Best result: 5th place, 2001

The Canada men’s national rugby sevens team competes at several international tournaments — the Rugby World Cup Sevens, Pan American Games and the Commonwealth Games. Following a loss in the Qualifier Playoffs in the Grand Finel, Canada were relegated from the World Rugby Sevens Series. They have qualified for the World Rugby Sevens Challenger Series.

== Honours ==
- 2011 Pan American Games Gold medal
- 2013 Rugby World Cup Sevens Plate Champions
- 2013 World Games Bronze medal
- 2015 Pan American Games Gold medal
- 2017 Singapore Sevens Cup Champions

== Players ==
=== Current squad ===
The following players have been selected to represent Canada during the 2023–24 SVNS tournament beginning in December 2023.

Note: Caps reflect the total number of SVNS events competed in as of the 2023 Dubai Sevens.

Player	Position	Date of birth (age)	Caps	Club/province
Phil Berna (c)	Forward	4 July 1996 (age 29)	47	Vancouver Rowing
Cody Nhanala	Forward	30 October 2001 (age 24)	3	Pacific Pride
Matt Oworu	Forward	29 July 2000 (age 25)	20	Pacific Pride
Alex Russell	Forward	22 June 1996 (age 29)	19	McGill University
Kal Sager	Forward	4 August 2000 (age 25)	12	Trent University
Jack Carson	Back	22 September 2001 (age 24)	7	University of British Columbia
Cooper Coats	Back	16 October 1996 (age 29)	14	Halifax Tars
Thomas Isherwood	Back	23 August 2000 (age 25)	21	Foothills Lions
Lockie Kratz	Back	27 March 2000 (age 26)	16	Castaway Wanderers
Josiah Morra	Back	7 February 1998 (age 28)	32	Castaway Wanderers
David Richard	Back	12 May 2000 (age 26)	17	Mississauga Blues
Max Stewart	Back	13 November 2001 (age 24)	5	Pacific Pride
Jake Thiel	Back	2 June 1997 (age 28)	34	James Bay

== World Rugby Sevens Series ==
The principal competition in which the Canada national rugby sevens team regularly competes is the World Rugby Sevens Series. Canada is one of the core teams that plays in every Series tournament.

=== Main Series ===
Season	Rank	Points	Tournaments	1st Cup	2nd Silver	3rd Bronze	5th Plate	9th Bowl
1999–00	6th	60	10/10	0	-	Wellington	0	0
2000–01	8th	26	9/9	0	0	-	0	Shanghai
2001–02	12th	8	10/11	0	0	-	0	0
2002–03	12th	6	7/7	0	0	-	Hong Kong	Wellington
2003–04	9th	22	8/8	0	0	-	0	Dubai; Hong Kong
2004–05	12th	2	7/7	0	0	-	0	USA
2005–06	12th	4	8/8	0	0	-	0	0
2006–07	13th	8	8/8	0	0	-	0	0
2007–08	16th	2	8/8	0	0	-	0	0
2008–09	15th	3	5/8	0	0	-	0	0
2009–10	11th	15	5/8	0	0	-	0	Hong Kong; London
2010–11	15th	5	5/8	0	0	-	0	Hong Kong
2011–12	13th	33	5/9	0	0	0	0	USA
2012–13	12th	69	9/9	0	0	0	USA	Wellington
2013–14	6th	90	9/9	0	Scotland	USA	0	London
2014–15	9th	67	9/9	0	0	0	0	South Africa
2015–16	13th	40	10/10	0	0	0	0	Sydney; Canada
2016–17	8th	98	10/10	Singapore	0	London	0	0
2017–18	9th	76	10/10	0	0	0	0	0
2018–19	11th	59	10/10	0	0	0	0	Paris
2019–20	8th	67	6/10	0	0	Canada	Hamilton	0
2021	4th	24	2/2	0	0	0	0	0
2021-22^{†}	14th	34 Ranking; 36 Total	9/9	0	0	0	0	0
2022-23	14th	39	11/11	0	0	0	0	0
2023-24	12th	14	8/8	0	0	0	0	0

Third place games/Bronze finals were introduced in the 2011-12 season. Starting in the 2016-17 season, Silver and Bronze medals were introduced, 5th place replaced the Plate, the Challenge Trophy replace the Bowl, and the 13th place replaced the Shield.
^{†} Due to the impacts of the COVID-19 pandemic, World Rugby revised the method used for the series standings in the interest of fairness to teams not able to participate in all rounds of the 2021–22 season. This system excluded the two lowest-scored rounds from each team in the final standings. So, with nine tournaments in the series, only the best seven tournament results for each team contributed to the ranking points.

=== Totals ===
Tournaments	Played	Won	Lost	Drawn	Win percentage	Points Scored	Points Conceded
197	1,073	440	616	18	41.01%	18,026	21,046

Last updated: 22 June 2024.

=== Challenger Series ===
Season	Rank	Points	Tournaments	1st Cup	2nd Silver	3rd Bronze
2025	3rd place, bronze medalist(s)	48	3/3	0	Cape Town 1	Cape Town 2

=== World Series Qualifier Playoffs ===
Season	Position	Pld	W	L	Qualifying
2025	=5th	4	2	2	Lost in Playoffs to Kenya 24-5

=== SVNS 3 ===
Season	Position	Pld	W	L	Qualifying
2026	1st place, gold medalist(s)	5	4	1	Qualified for 2026 SVNS 2

=== SVNS 2 ===
Season	Rank	Points	Tournaments	1st Cup	2nd Silver	3rd Bronze	Qualifying
2026	6th	34	3/3	0	0	0	Did not qualify

== Major quadrennial tournaments ==
Canada competes to participate in two major global quadrennial tournaments — the Summer Olympics and the Rugby World Cup Sevens.

=== Summer Olympics ===
Olympic Games record
Year	Round	Pos	Pld	W	L	D	Qualifying
(Brazil) 2016	Did not qualify						Lost in QF of the Final Qualification Tournament
(Japan) 2020	Quarterfinals	8th	6	1	5	0	Won 40–5 vs Jamaica at the 2019 RAN Sevens
(France) 2024	Did not qualify						Lost in SF of the Final Qualification Tournament
Total	0 Titles	1/3	6	1	5	0	

=== Rugby World Cup Sevens ===
World Cup record
Year	Round	Position	Pld	W	L	D
(Scotland) 1993	Bowl Semifinals	=15th	6	2	4	0
(Hong Kong) 1997	Bowl Quarterfinals	=21st	5	0	5	0
(Argentina) 2001	Quarterfinals	=5th	6	3	3	0
(Hong Kong) 2005	Group Stage	=18th	8	3	5	0
(United Arab Emirates) 2009	Plate Quarterfinals	=13th	4	2	2	0
(Russia) 2013	Plate Champions	9th	6	5	1	0
(United States) 2018	Challenge Trophy	12th	5	2	3	0
(South Africa) 2022	Challenge Trophy	13th	5	3	2	0
Total	0 Titles	8/8	45	20	25	0

== Other tournaments ==
=== Commonwealth Games ===
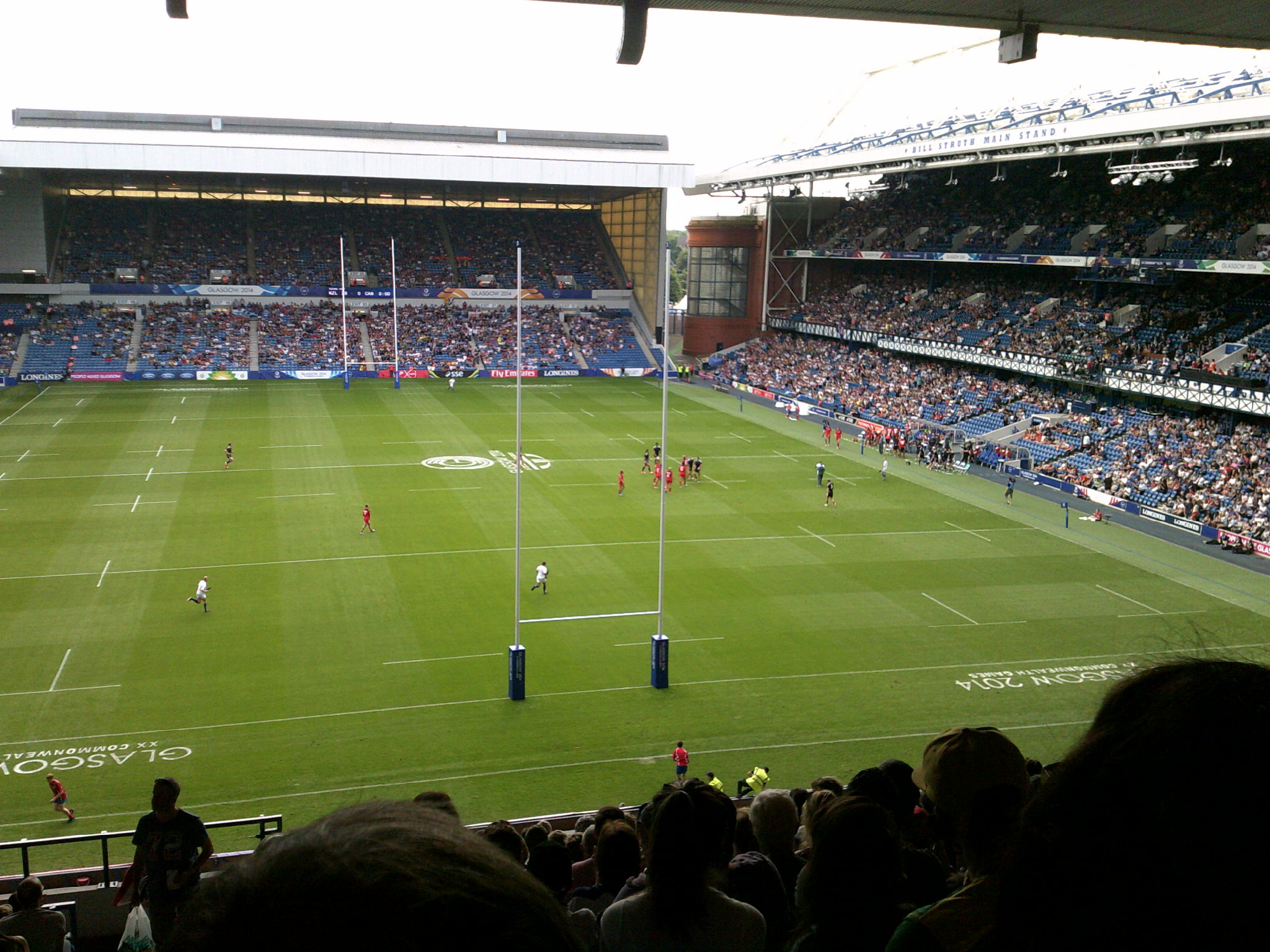
Canada playing New Zealand at the 2014 Commonwealth Games

Commonwealth Games record
Year	Round	Position	Pld	W	L	D
(Malaysia) 1998	Quarterfinals	5th	5	3	1	1
(England) 2002	Plate semifinals	7th	5	2	3	0
(Australia) 2006	Quarterfinals	5th	4	2	2	0
(India) 2010	Bowl finals	10th	6	3	3	0
(Scotland) 2014	Bowl champions	9th	6	4	2	0
(Australia) 2018	Pool round	=9th	3	1	2	0
(England) 2022	Quarterfinals	=7th	5	2	3	0
Total	0 Titles	7/7	34	17	16	1

=== Pan American Games ===
Pan Am Games record
Year	Round	Position	Pld	W	L	D
(Mexico) 2011	Finals	1st place, gold medalist(s)	6	6	0	0
(Canada) 2015	Finals	1st place, gold medalist(s)	6	5	1	0
(Peru) 2019	Finals	2nd place, silver medalist(s)	5	3	2	0
(Chile) 2023	Finals	3rd place, bronze medalist(s)	5	3	2	0
Total	2 Titles	4/4	22	17	5	0

=== World Games ===
World Games record
Year	Round	Position	Pld	W	L	D
(Japan) 2001	Quarter-finals	6th	6	1	5	0
(Germany) 2005	did not participate					
(Chinese Taipei) 2009	did not participate					
(Colombia) 2013	Semi-finals	3rd place, bronze medalist(s)	6	4	2	0
Total	0 Titles	2/4	12	5	7	0

- Rugby sevens was discontinued after the 2013 World Games due to the sport returning to the Olympics in 2016.

== Player records ==
The following shows the Canadian statistical leaders based on World Series play.

Most matches
Rank	Player	Matches
1	Nathan Hirayama	363
2	Harry Jones	327
3	John Moonlight	318
4	Phil Mack	269
4	Mike Fuailefau	269
6	**Phil Berna**	242
7	Justin Douglas	239
8	Conor Trainor	214
9	Pat Kay	209
10	Sean Duke	202

Most points
Rank	Player	Points
1	Nathan Hirayama	1,859
2	Phil Mack	973
3	Harry Jones	782
4	Justin Douglas	725
5	Sean Duke	622
6	John Moonlight	580
7	David Moonlight	553
8	Mike Danskin	480
9	Marco Di Girolamo	392
10	Shane Thompson	375

Most tries
Rank	Player	Tries
1	Nathan Hirayama	147
2	Justin Douglas	144
3	Harry Jones	126
4	Sean Duke	124
5	John Moonlight	116
6	David Moonlight	107
7	Phil Mack	95
8	Shane Thompson	75
9	Fred Asselin	63
9	Mike Fuailefau	63

Most conversions
Rank	Player	Conv
1	Nathan Hirayama	559
2	Phil Mack	246
3	Mike Danskin	135
4	Jeff Williams	105
4	**Cooper Coats**	105
6	Harry Jones	76
7	Marco Di Girolamo	56
8	Derek Daypuck	42
9	Ed Fairhurst	37
9	Pat Kay	37

Last updated: 11 December 2023.
Note: Bold indicates active in 2023-24 season.

== See also ==
- Rugby World Cup Sevens
- Canada national rugby union team
