= Herman Mostert =

South African rugby union player

- Born: Herman Mostert; 13 February 1969 (age 57) Somerset West, South Africa
- Height: 1.90 m (6 ft 3 in)
- Weight: 90 kg (200 lb; 14 st)
- University: Stellenbosch University

Rugby union career
- Position: wing
Senior career
Years	Team	Apps	(Points)
1990–1992	Mystic River		
1999–2001	Western Province		
National sevens team
Years	Team		Comps
1999–2001	South Africa Sevens		18

Herman Mostert (born 13 February 1969) is a South African former rugby union player who appeared in 18 World Rugby Sevens Series tournaments as a member of the South Africa national rugby sevens team between 1999 and 2001.

== Rugby career ==
=== Club career ===
In college, Mostert played for Stellenbosch University as a wing. He played rugby in the United States with the Mystic River Rugby Club from 1990 to 1992, helping the Boston based club to the USA Rugby National Championship match in 1992. Mostert was later a member of the Western Province team which won the 2000 Currie Cup.

=== International career ===
He made his debut for South Africa in February 1999 at the Fiji Sevens and would make appearances at Hong Kong and Paris Sevens later that year. He was again named to South Africa's roster for the 1999–2000 World Sevens Series, making four more appearances for the Springboks, including the 2000 Paris Sevens tournament where South Africa would fall to New Zealand 69-10 in the Cup finals.

In September 2000, he was named to the Springbok roster for the opening tournament of the 2000–01 World Sevens Series in Durban, South Africa. Mostert would make appearances in 9 more tournaments during the 2000–01 World Sevens Series. He then played for the Springboks in the next two tournaments in that series, helping South Africa win the Plate Championship in 2000 Dubai and Bowl Championship in 2001 Wellington Sevens. Later in 2001, Mostert would go on to play for South Africa in Hong Kong, Shanghai, Kuala Lumpur, Tokyo, London and Cardiff, bringing the number of his World Sevens Series appearances to 18.
