= 2001 Shanghai Sevens =

Rugby union 7-a-side tournament

- IRB Sevens II
- Host nation: China
- Date: 7–8 April 2001

Cup
- Champion: Australia
- Runner-up: South Africa

Plate
- Winner: Fiji
- Runner-up: England

Bowl
- Winner: Canada
- Runner-up: Wales

Tournament details
- Matches played: 44

The 2001 Shanghai Sevens was an international rugby sevens tournament that was held in Shanghai, China as the fifth leg of the 2000–01 World Sevens Series. It was the first China Sevens tournament to be hosted as part of the World Sevens Series, and the event took place at the Yuanshen Stadium on 8–9 April 2001.

Australia won the Shanghai Sevens after they defeated South Africa 19–12 to go to second place in the overall standings.

== Format ==
The teams were drawn into four pools of four teams each. Each team played the other teams in their pool once, with 3 points awarded for a win, 2 points for a draw, and 1 point for a loss (no points awarded for a forfeit). The pool stage was played on the first day of the tournament. The top two teams from each pool advanced to the Cup/Plate brackets. The bottom two teams from each group went to the Bowl/Shield brackets.

== Teams ==
The 16 participating teams for the tournament:

- Argentina
- Australia
- Canada
- China
- Chinese Taipei
- England
- Fiji
- Japan
- Hong Kong
- Malaysia
- New Zealand
- Samoa
- Sri Lanka
- South Africa
- South Korea
- Wales

== Pool stage ==
The pool stage was played on the first day of the tournament. The 16 teams were separated into four pools of four teams and teams in the same pool played each other once. The top two teams in each pool advanced to the Cup quarterfinals to compete for the 2001 Shanghai Sevens title.

Key to colours in group tables
Teams that advanced to the Cup quarterfinals
Teams that advanced to the Bowl quarterfinals

=== Pool A ===
Pos	Team	Pld	W	D	L	PF	PA	PD	Pts
1	South Africa	3	3	0	0	129	7	122	9
2	Fiji	3	2	0	1	116	19	97	7
3	Chinese Taipei	3	1	0	2	34	101	−67	5
4	Malaysia	3	0	0	3	7	159	−152	3

Source: World Rugby

7 April 2001

Fiji	45–0	Chinese Taipei

Yuanshen Stadium, Shanghai

7 April 2001

South Africa	61–0	Malaysia

Yuanshen Stadium, Shanghai

7 April 2001

Fiji	71–0	Malaysia

Yuanshen Stadium, Shanghai

7 April 2001

South Africa	49–7	Chinese Taipei

Yuanshen Stadium, Shanghai

7 April 2001

Chinese Taipei	27–7	Malaysia

Yuanshen Stadium, Shanghai

7 April 2001

South Africa	19–0	Fiji

Yuanshen Stadium, Shanghai

=== Pool B ===
Pos	Team	Pld	W	D	L	PF	PA	PD	Pts
1	Australia	3	3	0	0	164	7	157	9
2	England	3	2	0	1	53	57	-4	7
3	Wales	3	1	0	2	38	95	−57	5
4	China	3	0	0	3	28	124	−96	3

Source: World Rugby

7 April 2001

Australia	52–7	Wales

Yuanshen Stadium, Shanghai

7 April 2001

England	24–14	China

Yuanshen Stadium, Shanghai

7 April 2001

Australia	69–0	China

Yuanshen Stadium, Shanghai

7 April 2001

England	29–0	Wales

Yuanshen Stadium, Shanghai

7 April 2001

Wales	31–14	China

Yuanshen Stadium, Shanghai

7 April 2001

Australia	43–0	England

Yuanshen Stadium, Shanghai

=== Pool C ===
Pos	Team	Pld	W	D	L	PF	PA	PD	Pts
1	New Zealand	3	3	0	0	147	5	142	9
2	Argentina	3	2	0	1	74	43	31	7
3	Japan	3	1	0	2	48	81	−33	5
4	Sri Lanka	3	0	0	3	5	145	−140	3

Source: World Rugby

7 April 2001

New Zealand	36–5	Japan

Yuanshen Stadium, Shanghai

7 April 2001

Argentina	34–0	Sri Lanka

Yuanshen Stadium, Shanghai

7 April 2001

New Zealand	73–0	Sri Lanka

Yuanshen Stadium, Shanghai

7 April 2001

Argentina	40–5	Japan

Yuanshen Stadium, Shanghai

7 April 2001

Japan	38–5	Sri Lanka

Yuanshen Stadium, Shanghai

7 April 2001

New Zealand	38–0	Argentina

Yuanshen Stadium, Shanghai

=== Pool D ===
Pos	Team	Pld	W	D	L	PF	PA	PD	Pts
1	South Korea	3	3	0	0	97	46	51	9
2	Samoa	3	2	0	1	86	34	52	7
3	Canada	3	1	0	2	49	64	−15	5
4	Hong Kong	3	0	0	3	19	107	−88	3

Source: World Rugby

7 April 2001

South Korea	24–17	Samoa

Yuanshen Stadium, Shanghai

7 April 2001

Canada	29–0	Hong Kong

Yuanshen Stadium, Shanghai

7 April 2001

Samoa	38–0	Hong Kong

Yuanshen Stadium, Shanghai

7 April 2001

South Korea	33–10	Canada

Yuanshen Stadium, Shanghai

7 April 2001

South Korea	40–19	Hong Kong

Yuanshen Stadium, Shanghai

7 April 2001

Samoa	31–10	Canada

Yuanshen Stadium, Shanghai

== Knockout stage ==
=== Bowl ===
Quarter-finals
8 April 2001 – Yuanshen Stadium
China	14
Chinese Taipei	5
8 April 2001 – Yuanshen Stadium
Canada	47
Sri Lanka	0
8 April 2001 – Yuanshen Stadium
Hong Kong	20
Japan	14
8 April 2001 – Yuanshen Stadium
Wales	41
Malaysia	0

Semi-finals
8 April 2001 – Yuanshen Stadium
China	0
Canada	22
8 April 2001 – Yuanshen Stadium
Hong Kong	7
Wales	21

Final
8 April 2001 – Yuanshen Stadium
Canada	32
Wales	19

Source: World Rugby

=== Plate ===
Semi-finals
8 April 2001 – Yuanshen Stadium
England	19
Argentina	17
8 April 2001 – Yuanshen Stadium
Samoa	12
Fiji	31

Final
8 April 2001 – Yuanshen Stadium
England	14
Fiji	45

Source: World Rugby

=== Cup ===
Quarter-finals
8 April 2001 – Yuanshen Stadium
South Africa	24
England	7
8 April 2001 – Yuanshen Stadium
South Korea	26
Argentina	7
8 April 2001 – Yuanshen Stadium
New Zealand	19
Samoa	5
8 April 2001 – Yuanshen Stadium
Australia	5
Fiji	0

Semi-finals
8 April 2001 – Yuanshen Stadium
South Africa	40
South Korea	10
8 April 2001 – Yuanshen Stadium
New Zealand	7
Australia	19

Final
8 April 2001 – Yuanshen Stadium
South Africa	12
Australia	19

Source: World Rugby

== Tournament placings ==
Place	Team	Points
1st place, gold medalist(s)	Australia	20
2nd place, silver medalist(s)	South Africa	16
3rd place, bronze medalist(s)	New Zealand	12
3rd place, bronze medalist(s)	South Korea	12
5	Fiji	8
6	England	6
7	Argentina	4
7	Samoa	4

Place	Team	Points
9	Canada	2
10	Wales	0
11	China	0
11	Hong Kong	0
13	Chinese Taipei	0
13	Japan	0
13	Malaysia	0
13	Sri Lanka	0

Source: Rugby7.com

== Series standings ==
At the completion of Round 5:

Pos.	Event Team	Durban	Dubai	Wellington	Hong Kong	Shanghai	Kuala Lumpur	Tokyo	London	Cardiff	Points total
1	New Zealand	20	20	4	30	12					86
2	Australia	12	12	20	18	20					82
3	Fiji	16	16	16	24	8					80
4	Samoa	6	12	8	18	4					48
5	South Africa	8	8	2	8	16					42
6	Argentina	12	6	6	8	4					36
7	England	0	4	0	8	6					18
8	Canada	4	0	4	8	2					18
9	United States	—	—	12	4	—					16
10	South Korea	—	—	—	0	12					12
11	Cook Islands	—	—	12	—	—					12
12	France	4	—	—	2	—					6
13	Zimbabwe	0	4	—	—	—					4
14	Portugal	2	—	—	2	—					4
15	Wales	0	0	0	3	0					3
16	Ireland	—	2	—	—	—					2
17	Hong Kong	—	0	—	1	0					1
18	China	—	—	0	0	0					0
18	Japan	—	—	0	0	0					0
20	Georgia	0	0	—	—	—					0
20	Kenya	0	0	—	—	—					0
20	Morocco	0	0	—	—	—					0
20	(Cooperation Council for the Arab States of the Gulf) Arabian Gulf	—	0	—	0	—					0
20	Chinese Taipei	—	—	—	0	0					0
20	Malaysia	—	—	—	0	0					0
20	Sri Lanka	—	—	—	0	0					0
27	Namibia	0	—	—	—	—					0
27	Niue	—	—	0	—	—					0
27	Papua New Guinea	—	—	0	—	—					0
27	Russia	—	—	—	0	—					0
27	Singapore	—	—	—	0	—					0
27	Thailand	—	—	—	0	—					0
27	Tonga	—	—	0	—	—					0
27	West Indies	—	—	—	0	—					0

Source: Rugby7.com

IRB Sevens II
Preceded by 2001 Hong Kong Sevens	2001 Shanghai Sevens	Succeeded by 2001 Kuala Lumpur Sevens
China Sevens
Preceded by None	2001 Shanghai Sevens	Succeeded by 2002 Shanghai Sevens
