= 2001 Kuala Lumpur Sevens =

- IRB Sevens II
- Host nation: Malaysia
- Date: 21–22 April 2001

Cup
- Champion: Australia
- Runner-up: New Zealand

Plate
- Winner: Samoa
- Runner-up: France

Bowl
- Winner: South Korea
- Runner-up: England

Tournament details
- Matches played: 44

The 2001 Kuala Lumpur Sevens was an international rugby sevens tournament that was held in Kuala Lumpur, Malaysia as the sixth leg of the 2000–01 World Sevens Series. It was the first Malaysia Sevens tournament to be hosted as part of the World Sevens Series, and the event took place at the Petaling Jaya Stadium on 21–22 April 2001.

In their first event as hosts, Malaysia were defeated 36–5 by Canada in the Bowl quarterfinals whilst Australia won back to back Sevens titles for the first time by defeating New Zealand 19–17 in the Cup final.

== Format ==
The teams were drawn into four pools of four teams each. Each team played the other teams in their pool once, with 3 points awarded for a win, 2 points for a draw, and 1 point for a loss (no points awarded for a forfeit). The pool stage was played on the first day of the tournament. The top two teams from each pool advanced to the Cup/Plate brackets. he bottom two teams from each pool went on to the Bowl bracket. No Shield trophy was on offer in the 2000–01 season.

== Teams ==
The 16 participating teams for the tournament:

- Argentina
- Australia
- Canada
- Chinese Taipei
- England
- Fiji
- France
- Japan
- Malaysia
- New Zealand
- Samoa
- Singapore
- South Africa
- South Korea
- Thailand
- Wales

== Pool stage ==
The pool stage was played on the first day of the tournament. The 16 teams were separated into four pools of four teams and teams in the same pool played each other once. The top two teams in each pool advanced to the Cup quarterfinals to compete for the 2001 Kuala Lumpur Sevens title.

Key to colours in group tables
Teams that advanced to the Cup quarterfinals
Teams that advanced to the Bowl quarterfinals

=== Pool A ===
Pos	Team	Pld	W	D	L	PF	PA	PD	Pts
1	New Zealand	3	3	0	0	113	10	103	9
2	Wales	3	2	0	1	67	40	27	7
3	England	3	1	0	2	50	67	−17	5
4	Malaysia	3	0	0	3	17	130	−113	3

Source: World Rugby

21 April 2001

New Zealand	19–5	Wales

Petaling Jaya Stadium, Kuala Lumpur

21 April 2001

England	31–10	Malaysia

Petaling Jaya Stadium, Kuala Lumpur

21 April 2001

New Zealand	61–0	Malaysia

Petaling Jaya Stadium, Kuala Lumpur

21 April 2001

Wales	24–14	England

Petaling Jaya Stadium, Kuala Lumpur

21 April 2001

Wales	38–7	Malaysia

Petaling Jaya Stadium, Kuala Lumpur

21 April 2001

New Zealand	33–5	England

Petaling Jaya Stadium, Kuala Lumpur

=== Pool B ===
Pos	Team	Pld	W	D	L	PF	PA	PD	Pts
1	Australia	3	3	0	0	98	0	98	9
2	France	3	1	1	1	38	40	–2	6
3	Canada	3	1	1	1	33	60	−27	6
4	Chinese Taipei	3	0	0	3	29	98	−69	3

Source: World Rugby

21 April 2001

Australia	14–0	France

Petaling Jaya Stadium, Kuala Lumpur

21 April 2001

Canada	19–17	Chinese Taipei

Petaling Jaya Stadium, Kuala Lumpur

21 April 2001

France	24–12	Chinese Taipei

Petaling Jaya Stadium, Kuala Lumpur

21 April 2001

Australia	55–0	Chinese Taipei

Petaling Jaya Stadium, Kuala Lumpur

21 April 2001

Canada	14–14	France

Petaling Jaya Stadium, Kuala Lumpur

21 April 2001

Australia	29–0	Canada

Petaling Jaya Stadium, Kuala Lumpur

=== Pool C ===
Pos	Team	Pld	W	D	L	PF	PA	PD	Pts
1	Fiji	3	3	0	0	120	14	106	9
2	Argentina	3	2	0	1	64	66	–2	7
3	South Korea	3	1	0	2	61	73	−12	5
4	Thailand	3	0	0	3	31	123	−92	3

Source: World Rugby

21 April 2001

Fiji	33–7	South Korea

Petaling Jaya Stadium, Kuala Lumpur

21 April 2001

Argentina	31–17	Thailand

Petaling Jaya Stadium, Kuala Lumpur

21 April 2001

Fiji	52–0	Thailand

Petaling Jaya Stadium, Kuala Lumpur

21 April 2001

Argentina	26–14	South Korea

Petaling Jaya Stadium, Kuala Lumpur

21 April 2001

South Korea	40–14	Thailand

Petaling Jaya Stadium, Kuala Lumpur

21 April 2001

Fiji	35–7	Argentina

Petaling Jaya Stadium, Kuala Lumpur

=== Pool D ===
Pos	Team	Pld	W	D	L	PF	PA	PD	Pts
1	South Africa	3	2	1	0	92	5	87	8
2	Samoa	3	2	1	0	88	24	64	8
3	Japan	3	1	0	2	33	98	−65	5
4	Singapore	3	0	0	3	22	108	−86	3

Source: World Rugby

21 April 2001

Samoa	38–7	Japan

Petaling Jaya Stadium, Kuala Lumpur

21 April 2001

South Africa	37–0	Singapore

Petaling Jaya Stadium, Kuala Lumpur

21 April 2001

South Africa	50–0	Japan

Petaling Jaya Stadium, Kuala Lumpur

21 April 2001

Samoa	45–12	Singapore

Petaling Jaya Stadium, Kuala Lumpur

21 April 2001

Japan	26–10	Singapore

Petaling Jaya Stadium, Kuala Lumpur

21 April 2001

Samoa	5–5	South Africa

Petaling Jaya Stadium, Kuala Lumpur

== Knockout stage ==
=== Bowl ===
Quarter-finals
22 April 2001 – Petaling Jaya Stadium
England	38
Chinese Taipei	0
22 April 2001 – Petaling Jaya Stadium
Japan	24
Thailand	19
22 April 2001 – Petaling Jaya Stadium
South Korea	33
Singapore	0
22 April 2001 – Petaling Jaya Stadium
Canada	36
Malaysia	5

Semi-finals
22 April 2001 – Petaling Jaya Stadium
England	34
Japan	7
22 April 2001 – Petaling Jaya Stadium
South Korea	12
Canada	5

Final
22 April 2001 – Petaling Jaya Stadium
England	12
South Korea	24

Source: World Rugby

=== Plate ===
Semi-finals
22 April 2001 – Petaling Jaya Stadium
France	14
Argentina	12
22 April 2001 – Petaling Jaya Stadium
Wales	0
Samoa	26

Final
22 April 2001 – Petaling Jaya Stadium
France	14
Samoa	19

Source: World Rugby

=== Cup ===
Quarter-finals
22 April 2001 – Petaling Jaya Stadium
New Zealand	26
France	5
22 April 2001 – Petaling Jaya Stadium
South Africa	24
Argentina	14
22 April 2001 – Petaling Jaya Stadium
Australia	24
Wales	14
22 April 2001 – Petaling Jaya Stadium
Fiji	26
Samoa	12

Semi-finals
22 April 2001 – Petaling Jaya Stadium
New Zealand	19
South Africa	7
22 April 2001 – Petaling Jaya Stadium
Australia	19
Fiji	7

Final
22 April 2001 – Petaling Jaya Stadium
New Zealand	17
Australia	19

Source: World Rugby

== Tournament placings ==
Place	Team	Points
1st place, gold medalist(s)	Australia	20
2nd place, silver medalist(s)	New Zealand	16
3rd place, bronze medalist(s)	Fiji	12
3rd place, bronze medalist(s)	South Africa	12
5	Samoa	8
6	France	6
7	Argentina	4
7	Wales	4

Place	Team	Points
9	South Korea	2
10	England	0
11	Canada	0
11	Japan	0
13	Chinese Taipei	0
13	Malaysia	0
13	Thailand	0
13	Singapore	0

Source: Rugby7.com

== Series standings ==
At the completion of Round 6:

Pos.	Event Team	Durban	Dubai	Wellington	Hong Kong	Shanghai	Kuala Lumpur	Tokyo	London	Cardiff	Points total
1	New Zealand	20	20	4	30	12	16				102
2	Australia	12	12	20	18	20	20				102
3	Fiji	16	16	16	24	8	12				92
4	Samoa	6	12	8	18	4	8				56
5	South Africa	8	8	2	8	16	12				54
6	Argentina	12	6	6	8	4	4				40
7	England	0	4	0	8	6	0				18
8	Canada	4	0	4	8	2	0				18
9	United States	—	—	12	4	—	—				16
10	South Korea	—	—	—	0	12	2				14
11	Cook Islands	—	—	12	—	—	—				12
12	France	4	—	—	2	—	6				12
13	Wales	0	0	0	3	0	4				7
14	Zimbabwe	0	4	—	—	—	—				4
15	Portugal	2	—	—	2	—	—				4
16	Ireland	—	2	—	—	—	—				2
17	Hong Kong	—	0	—	1	0	—				1
18	Japan	—	—	0	0	0	0				0
19	Chinese Taipei	—	—	—	0	0	0				0
19	Malaysia	—	—	—	0	0	0				0
19	China	—	—	0	0	0	—				0
22	Georgia	0	0	—	—	—	—				0
22	Kenya	0	0	—	—	—	—				0
22	Morocco	0	0	—	—	—	—				0
22	(Cooperation Council for the Arab States of the Gulf) Arabian Gulf	—	0	—	0	—	—				0
22	Singapore	—	—	—	0	—	0				0
22	Sri Lanka	—	—	—	0	0	—				0
22	Thailand	—	—	—	0	—	0				0
29	Namibia	0	—	—	—	—	—				0
29	Niue	—	—	0	—	—	—				0
29	Papua New Guinea	—	—	0	—	—	—				0
29	Russia	—	—	—	0	—	—				0
29	Tonga	—	—	0	—	—	—				0
29	West Indies	—	—	—	0	—	—				0

Source: Rugby7.com

IRB Sevens II
Preceded by 2001 Shanghai Sevens	2001 Kuala Lumpur Sevens	Succeeded by 2001 Tokyo Sevens
Malaysia Sevens
Preceded by None	2001 Kuala Lumpur Sevens	Succeeded by 2002 Kuala Lumpur Sevens
