= 2001 Tokyo Sevens =

- IRB Sevens II
- Host nation: Japan
- Date: 29–30 April 2001

Cup
- Champion: New Zealand
- Runner-up: Australia

Plate
- Winner: South Africa
- Runner-up: England

Bowl
- Winner: Argentina
- Runner-up: United States

Tournament details
- Matches played: 41

The 2001 Tokyo Sevens was an international rugby sevens tournament that was part of the World Sevens Series in the 2000–01 season. It was the Japan Sevens leg held at Chichibunomiya Rugby Stadium in Tokyo on 29–30 April 2001.

The tournament was the seventh event of the series, and was won by New Zealand who defeated Australia 26–12 in the Cup final.

== Format ==
The teams were drawn into four pools of four teams each. Each team played the other teams in their pool once, with 3 points awarded for a win, 2 points for a draw, and 1 point for a loss (no points awarded for a forfeit). The pool stage was played on the first day of the tournament. The top two teams from each pool advanced to the Cup/Plate brackets. The bottom two teams from each pool went on to the Bowl bracket. No Shield trophy was on offer in the 2000–01 season.

== Teams ==
The 16 participating teams for the tournament:

- Argentina
- Australia
- Canada
- Chinese Taipei
- England
- Fiji
- France
- Hong Kong
- Japan
- Malaysia
- New Zealand
- Samoa
- South Africa
- South Korea
- United States
- Wales

== Pool stage ==
The pool stage was played on the first day of the tournament. The 16 teams were separated into four pools of four teams and teams in the same pool played each other once. The top two teams in each pool advanced to the Cup quarterfinals to compete for the 2001 Tokyo Sevens title.

Key to colours in group tables
Teams that advanced to the Cup quarterfinals
Teams that advanced to the Bowl quarterfinals

=== Pool A ===
Pos	Team	Pld	W	D	L	PF	PA	PD	Pts
1	New Zealand	3	3	0	0	128	17	111	9
2	South Africa	3	2	0	1	73	38	35	7
3	South Korea	3	1	0	2	59	78	−19	5
4	Chinese Taipei	3	0	0	3	5	132	−127	3

Source: World Rugby

29 April 2001

New Zealand	52–5	South Korea

Chichibunomiya Rugby Stadium, Tokyo

29 April 2001

South Africa	40–0	Chinese Taipei

Chichibunomiya Rugby Stadium, Tokyo

29 April 2001

New Zealand	57–0	Chinese Taipei

Chichibunomiya Rugby Stadium, Tokyo

29 April 2001

South Africa	21–19	South Korea

Chichibunomiya Rugby Stadium, Tokyo

29 April 2001

South Korea	35–5	Chinese Taipei

Chichibunomiya Rugby Stadium, Tokyo

29 April 2001

New Zealand	19–12	South Africa

Chichibunomiya Rugby Stadium, Tokyo

Source: World Rugby

=== Pool B ===
Pos	Team	Pld	W	D	L	PF	PA	PD	Pts
1	Australia	3	3	0	0	133	0	0	9
2	England	3	2	0	1	55	38	17	7
3	Japan	3	1	0	2	54	65	−11	5
4	Malaysia	3	0	0	3	12	151	−139	3

Source: World Rugby

29 April 2001

Australia	34–0	Japan

Chichibunomiya Rugby Stadium, Tokyo

29 April 2001

England	31–5	Malaysia

Chichibunomiya Rugby Stadium, Tokyo

29 April 2001

Australia	73–0	Malaysia

Chichibunomiya Rugby Stadium, Tokyo

29 April 2001

England	24–7	Japan

Chichibunomiya Rugby Stadium, Tokyo

29 April 2001

Japan	47–7	Malaysia

Chichibunomiya Rugby Stadium, Tokyo

29 April 2001

Australia	26–0	England

Chichibunomiya Rugby Stadium, Tokyo

Source: World Rugby

=== Pool C ===
Pos	Team	Pld	W	D	L	PF	PA	PD	Pts
1	Fiji	3	3	0	0	104	12	92	9
2	Canada	3	2	0	1	81	40	41	7
3	France	3	1	0	2	19	62	−43	5
4	Hong Kong	3	0	0	3	0	90	−90	3

Source: World Rugby

29 April 2001

Fiji	31–0	France

Chichibunomiya Rugby Stadium, Tokyo

29 April 2001

Canada	38–0	Hong Kong

Chichibunomiya Rugby Stadium, Tokyo

29 April 2001

Fiji	33–0	Hong Kong

Chichibunomiya Rugby Stadium, Tokyo

29 April 2001

Canada	31–0	France

Chichibunomiya Rugby Stadium, Tokyo

29 April 2001

France	19–0	Hong Kong

Chichibunomiya Rugby Stadium, Tokyo

29 April 2001

Fiji	40–12	Canada

Chichibunomiya Rugby Stadium, Tokyo

Source: World Rugby

=== Pool D ===
Pos	Team	Pld	W	D	L	PF	PA	PD	Pts
1	Samoa	3	3	0	0	88	22	66	9
2	Wales	3	2	0	1	48	61	−13	7
3	Argentina	3	1	0	2	53	50	3	5
4	United States	3	0	0	3	24	80	−56	3

Source: World Rugby

29 April 2001

Samoa	22–10	United States

Chichibunomiya Rugby Stadium, Tokyo

29 April 2001

Argentina	12–19	Wales

Chichibunomiya Rugby Stadium, Tokyo

29 April 2001

Samoa	42–5	Wales

Chichibunomiya Rugby Stadium, Tokyo

29 April 2001

Argentina	34–7	United States

Chichibunomiya Rugby Stadium, Tokyo

29 April 2001

United States	7–24	Wales

Chichibunomiya Rugby Stadium, Tokyo

29 April 2001

Samoa	24–7	Argentina

Chichibunomiya Rugby Stadium, Tokyo

Source: World Rugby

== Knockout stage ==
=== Bowl ===
Quarter-finals
30 April 2001 – Chichibunomiya Rugby Stadium
South Korea	40
Malaysia	5
30 April 2001 – Chichibunomiya Rugby Stadium
Argentina	36
Hong Kong	0
30 April 2001 – Chichibunomiya Rugby Stadium
France	7
United States	12
30 April 2001 – Chichibunomiya Rugby Stadium
Japan	19
Chinese Taipei	12

Semi-finals
30 April 2001 – Chichibunomiya Rugby Stadium
South Korea	12
Argentina	17
30 April 2001 – Chichibunomiya Rugby Stadium
United States	19
Japan	5

Final
30 April 2001 – Chichibunomiya Rugby Stadium
Argentina	31
United States	19

Source: World Rugby

=== Plate ===
Semi-finals
30 April 2001 – Chichibunomiya Rugby Stadium
England	29
Canada	5
30 April 2001 – Chichibunomiya Rugby Stadium
Wales	7
South Africa	19

Final
30 April 2001 – Chichibunomiya Rugby Stadium
England	15
South Africa	38

Source: World Rugby

=== Cup ===
Quarter-finals
30 April 2001 – Chichibunomiya Rugby Stadium
New Zealand	26
England	7
30 April 2001 – Chichibunomiya Rugby Stadium
Samoa	12
Canada	7
30 April 2001 – Chichibunomiya Rugby Stadium
Fiji	38
Wales	5
30 April 2001 – Chichibunomiya Rugby Stadium
Australia	12
South Africa	10

Semi-finals
30 April 2001 – Chichibunomiya Rugby Stadium
New Zealand	17
Samoa	12
30 April 2001 – Chichibunomiya Rugby Stadium
Fiji	7
Australia	17

Final
30 April 2001 – Chichibunomiya Rugby Stadium
New Zealand	26
Australia	12

Source: World Rugby

== Tournament placings ==
Place	Team	Points
1st place, gold medalist(s)	New Zealand	20
2nd place, silver medalist(s)	Australia	16
3rd place, bronze medalist(s)	Fiji	12
3rd place, bronze medalist(s)	Samoa	12
5	South Africa	8
6	England	6
7	Canada	4
7	Wales	4

Place	Team	Points
9	Argentina	2
10	United States	0
11	Japan	0
11	South Korea	0
13	Chinese Taipei	0
13	France	0
13	Hong Kong	0
13	Malaysia	0

Source: Rugby7.com

== Series standings ==
At the completion of Round 7:

Pos.	Event Team	Durban	Dubai	Wellington	Hong Kong	Shanghai	Kuala Lumpur	Tokyo	London	Cardiff	Points total
1	New Zealand	20	20	4	30	12	16	20			122
2	Australia	12	12	20	18	20	20	16			118
3	Fiji	16	16	16	24	8	12	12			104
4	Samoa	6	12	8	18	4	8	12			68
5	South Africa	8	8	2	8	16	12	8			62
6	Argentina	12	6	6	8	4	4	2			42
7	England	0	4	0	8	6	0	6			24
8	Canada	4	0	4	8	2	0	4			22
9	United States	—	—	12	4	—	—	0			16
10	South Korea	—	—	—	0	12	2	0			14
11	Cook Islands	—	—	12	—	—	—	—			12
12	France	4	—	—	2	—	6	0			12
13	Wales	0	0	0	3	0	4	4			11
14	Zimbabwe	0	4	—	—	—	—	—			4
15	Portugal	2	—	—	2	—	—	—			4
16	Ireland	—	2	—	—	—	—	—			2
17	Hong Kong	—	0	—	1	0	—	0			1
18	Japan	—	—	0	0	0	0	0			0
19	Chinese Taipei	—	—	—	0	0	0	0			0
19	Malaysia	—	—	—	0	0	0	0			0
21	China	—	—	0	0	0	—	—			0
22	Georgia	0	0	—	—	—	—	—			0
22	Kenya	0	0	—	—	—	—	—			0
22	Morocco	0	0	—	—	—	—	—			0
22	(Cooperation Council for the Arab States of the Gulf) Arabian Gulf	—	0	—	0	—	—	—			0
22	Singapore	—	—	—	0	—	0	—			0
22	Sri Lanka	—	—	—	0	0	—	—			0
22	Thailand	—	—	—	0	—	0	—			0
29	Namibia	0	—	—	—	—	—	—			0
29	Niue	—	—	0	—	—	—	—			0
29	Papua New Guinea	—	—	0	—	—	—	—			0
29	Russia	—	—	—	0	—	—	—			0
29	Tonga	—	—	0	—	—	—	—			0
29	West Indies	—	—	—	0	—	—	—			0

Source: Rugby7.com

IRB Sevens II
Preceded by 2001 Kuala Lumpur Sevens	2001 Tokyo Sevens	Succeeded by 2001 London Sevens
Japan Sevens
Preceded by 2000 Tokyo Sevens	2001 Tokyo Sevens	Succeeded by 2012 Japan Sevens
