= 2001 London Sevens =

- IRB Sevens II
- Host nation: England
- Date: 27–28 May 2001

Cup
- Champion: New Zealand
- Runner-up: Australia

Plate
- Winner: South Africa
- Runner-up: England

Bowl
- Winner: Wales
- Runner-up: Scotland

Tournament details
- Matches played: 41

The 2001 London Sevens was an international rugby sevens tournament that was part of the World Sevens Series in the 2000–01 season. It was the London Sevens leg held at Twickenham Stadium on 27–28 May 2001.

The tournament was the eighth event of the series, and was won by New Zealand who defeated Australia 19–12 in the Cup final.

== Format ==
The teams were drawn into four pools of four teams each. Each team played the other teams in their pool once, with 3 points awarded for a win, 2 points for a draw, and 1 point for a loss (no points awarded for a forfeit). The pool stage was played on the first day of the tournament. The top two teams from each pool advanced to the Cup/Plate brackets. The bottom two teams from each pool went on to the Bowl bracket. No Shield trophy was on offer in the 2000–01 season.

== Teams ==
The 16 participating teams for the tournament:

- Argentina
- Australia
- Canada
- England
- Fiji
- France
- Georgia
- New Zealand
- Portugal
- Russia
- Samoa
- Scotland
- South Africa
- Spain
- Wales
- West Indies

== Pool stage ==
The pool stage was played on the first day of the tournament. The 16 teams were separated into four pools of four teams and teams in the same pool played each other once. The top two teams in each pool advanced to the Cup quarterfinals to compete for the 2001 Tokyo Sevens title.

Key to colours in group tables
Teams that advanced to the Cup quarterfinals
Teams that advanced to the Bowl quarterfinals

=== Pool A ===
Pos	Team	Pld	W	D	L	PF	PA	PD	Pts
1	New Zealand	3	3	0	0	114	5	109	9
2	Canada	3	2	0	1	36	53	–17	7
3	Russia	3	1	0	2	29	76	−47	5
4	Georgia	3	0	0	3	19	64	−45	3

Source: World Rugby

27 May 2001

New Zealand	31-0	Georgia

Twickenham Stadium, London

27 May 20011

Canada	17–10	Russia

Twickenham Stadium, London

27 May 2001

New Zealand	54–5	Russia

Twickenham Stadium, London

27 May 2001

Canada	19–14	Georgia

Twickenham Stadium, London

27 May 2001

Georgia	5–14	Russia

Twickenham Stadium, London

27 May 2001

New Zealand	29–0	Canada

Twickenham Stadium, London

Source: World Rugby

=== Pool B ===
Pos	Team	Pld	W	D	L	PF	PA	PD	Pts
1	Australia	3	3	0	0	92	5	87	9
2	Argentina	3	1	0	2	36	43	–7	5
3	France	3	1	0	2	54	65	–15	5
4	Spain	3	1	0	2	12	151	−65	5

Source: World Rugby

27 May 2001

Australia	12–5	France

Twickenham Stadium, London

27 May 2001

Argentina	19–24	Spain

Twickenham Stadium, London

27 May 2001

Australia	61–0	Spain

Twickenham Stadium, London

27 May 2001

Argentina	17–0	France

Twickenham Stadium, London

27 May 2001

France	21–12	Spain

Twickenham Stadium, London

27 May 2001

Australia	19–0	Argentina

Twickenham Stadium, London

Source: World Rugby

=== Pool C ===
Pos	Team	Pld	W	D	L	PF	PA	PD	Pts
1	South Africa	3	3	0	0	64	33	31	9
2	Fiji	3	2	0	1	76	41	35	7
3	Scotland	3	1	0	2	39	57	–18	5
4	Portugal	3	0	0	3	33	81	–48	3

Source: World Rugby

27 May 2001

Fiji	36–14	Portugal

Twickenham Stadium, London

27 May 2001

South Africa	19–12	Scotland

Twickenham Stadium, London

27 May 2001

Fiji	26–10	Scotland

Twickenham Stadium, London

27 May 2001

South Africa	28–7	Portugal

Twickenham Stadium, London

27 May 2001

Portugal	12–17	Scotland

Twickenham Stadium, London

27 May 2001

Fiji	14–17	South Africa

Twickenham Stadium, London

Source: World Rugby

=== Pool D ===
Pos	Team	Pld	W	D	L	PF	PA	PD	Pts
1	England	3	3	0	0	77	24	53	9
2	Samoa	3	2	0	1	98	27	71	7
3	Wales	3	1	0	2	36	57	–21	5
4	West Indies	3	0	0	3	19	122	−103	3

Source: World Rugby

27 May 2001

Samoa	24–5	Wales

Twickenham Stadium, London

27 May 2001

England	36–5	West Indies

Twickenham Stadium, London

27 May 2001

Samoa	55–0	West Indies

Twickenham Stadium, London

27 May 2001

England	19–0	Wales

Twickenham Stadium, London

27 May 2001

Wales	31–14	West Indies

Twickenham Stadium, London

27 May 2001

Samoa	19–22	England

Twickenham Stadium, London

Source: World Rugby

== Knockout stage ==
=== Bowl ===
Quarter-finals
28 May 2001 – Twickenham Stadium
Russia	26
Spain	5
28 May 2001 – Twickenham Stadium
Wales	15
Portugal	12
28 May 2001 – Twickenham Stadium
Scotland	44
West Indies	0
28 May 2001 – Twickenham Stadium
France	12
Georgia	17

Semi-finals
28 May 2001 – Twickenham Stadium
Russia	12
Wales	33
28 May 2001 – Twickenham Stadium
Scotland	19
Georgia	14

Final
28 May 2001 – Twickenham Stadium
'Wales	31
Scotland	19

Source: World Rugby

=== Plate ===
Semi-finals
28 May 2001 – Twickenham Stadium
Argentina	14
England	33
28 May 2001 – Twickenham Stadium
South Africa	43
Canada	0

Final
28 May 2001 – Twickenham Stadium
England	7
South Africa	31

Source: World Rugby

=== Cup ===
Quarter-finals
28 May 2001 – Twickenham Stadium
New Zealand	28
Argentina	12
28 May 2001 – Twickenham Stadium
England	12
Fiji	14
28 May 2001 – Twickenham Stadium
South Africa	14
Samoa	21
28 May 2001 – Twickenham Stadium
Australia	33
Canada	12

Semi-finals
28 May 2001 – Twickenham Stadium
New Zealand	15
Fiji	7
28 May 2001 – Twickenham Stadium
Samoa	17
Australia	33

Final
28 May 2001 – Twickenham Stadium
New Zealand	19
Australia	12

Source: World Rugby

== Tournament placings ==
Place	Team	Points
1st place, gold medalist(s)	New Zealand	20
2nd place, silver medalist(s)	Australia	16
3rd place, bronze medalist(s)	Fiji	12
3rd place, bronze medalist(s)	Samoa	12
5	South Africa	8
6	England	6
7	Canada	4
7	Argentina	4

Place	Team	Points
9	Wales	2
10	Scotland	0
11	Georgia	0
11	Russia	0
13	France	0
13	Portugal	0
13	Spain	0
13	West Indies	0

Source: World Rugby

== Series standings ==
At the completion of Round 8:

Pos.	Event Team	Durban	Dubai	Wellington	Hong Kong	Shanghai	Kuala Lumpur	Tokyo	London	Cardiff	Points total
1	New Zealand	20	20	4	30	12	16	20	20		142
2	Australia	12	12	20	18	20	20	16	16		134
3	Fiji	16	16	16	24	8	12	12	12		116
4	Samoa	6	12	8	18	4	8	12	12		80
5	South Africa	8	8	2	8	16	12	8	8		70
6	Argentina	12	6	6	8	4	4	2	4		46
7	England	0	4	0	8	6	0	6	6		30
8	Canada	4	0	4	8	2	0	4	4		26
9	United States	—	—	12	4	—	—	0	—		16
10	South Korea	—	—	—	0	12	2	0	—		14
11	Wales	0	0	0	3	0	4	4	2		13
12	France	4	—	—	2	—	6	0	0		12
13	Cook Islands	—	—	12	—	—	—	—	—		12
14	Zimbabwe	0	4	—	—	—	—	—	—		4
15	Portugal	2	—	—	2	—	—	—	0		4
16	Ireland	—	2	—	—	—	—	—	—		2
17	Hong Kong	—	0	—	1	0	—	0	—		1
18	Japan	—	—	0	0	0	0	0	—		0
18	Chinese Taipei	—	—	—	0	0	0	0	—		0
18	Malaysia	—	—	—	0	0	0	0	—		0
18	China	—	—	0	0	0	—	—	—		0
18	Georgia	0	0	—	—	—	—	—	0		0
18	Kenya	0	0	—	—	—	—	—	—		0
18	Morocco	0	0	—	—	—	—	—	—		0
18	(Cooperation Council for the Arab States of the Gulf) Arabian Gulf	—	0	—	0	—	—	—	—		0
18	Singapore	—	—	—	0	—	0	—	—		0
18	Sri Lanka	—	—	—	0	0	—	—	—		0
18	Thailand	—	—	—	0	—	0	—	—		0
18	Namibia	0	—	—	—	—	—	—	—		0
18	Niue	—	—	0	—	—	—	—	—		0
18	Papua New Guinea	—	—	0	—	—	—	—	—		0
18	Russia	—	—	—	0	—	—	—	0		0
18	Scotland	—	—	—	—	—	—	—	0		0
18	Tonga	—	—	0	—	—	—	—	—		0
18	West Indies	—	—	—	0	—	—	—	0		0

Source: Rugby7.com

IRB Sevens II
Preceded by 2001 Tokyo Sevens	2001 London Sevens	Succeeded by 2001 Cardiff Sevens
London Sevens
Preceded by —	2001 London Sevens	Succeeded by 2002 London Sevens
