= 2001 Cardiff Sevens =

- IRB Sevens II
- Host nation: Wales
- Date: 2–3 June 2001

Cup
- Champion: New Zealand
- Runner-up: Australia

Plate
- Winner: Fiji
- Runner-up: Wales

Bowl
- Winner: England
- Runner-up: Portugal

Tournament details
- Matches played: 41

The 2001 Cardiff Sevens was a rugby sevens tournament that took place at the Rodney Parade with the finals being held at the Millennium Stadium. It took place between 2–3 June 2001 and was the first edition of the Cardiff Sevens and the final round of the 2000–01 World Sevens Series.

Heading into the tournament, New Zealand held an eight-point lead over Australia with a semi-final placing in the cup being enough to give New Zealand the title. After both teams qualified through to the cup knockout stage with them only conceding ten points between the two, they would meet in the cup final with New Zealand taking out not only the Cardiff Sevens but the World Series with a 31–5 win over Australia. In the minor placings, Fiji took out the plate final defeating Wales while England won the bowl over Portugal.

== Teams ==
16 teams participated in the final round of the World Sevens Series:

- Argentina
- Australia
- Canada
- England
- Fiji
- France
- Georgia
- New Zealand
- Portugal
- Russia
- Samoa
- Scotland
- Spain
- South Africa
- Wales
- West Indies

== Format ==
The teams were drawn into four pools of four teams each. Each team played the other teams in their pool once, with 3 points awarded for a win, 2 points for a draw, and 1 point for a loss (no points awarded for a forfeit). The pool stage was played on the first day of the tournament. The top two teams from each pool advanced to the Cup/Plate brackets. The bottom two teams from each pool went on to the Bowl bracket.

== Summary ==
The opening day of the 2001 Cardiff Sevens saw the leading two nations (Australia and New Zealand) each finished top of their pool group while only conceding five points in their pool stage. The Northern hemisphere teams though had a day that they rather forget with only Wales qualifying through to the quarter-finals of the major European teams with France and Scotland not recording a single win while England only recorded 19-all draw with Spain before losing to the qualifiers of Pool C in Fiji in Georgia. Samoa finished ahead of South Africa in Pool D with the Samoans getting a 28–10 win.

In the cup quarter-finals, New Zealand would take the World Sevens title defeating Wales 29–0 to claim their second World Sevens title. They would also go on to win the Cup final over Australia with tries from Chris Masoe and Damian Karauna securing a 31–5 victory. In the plate-final, Fiji took home the plate defeating host nation Wales who came back from 19–0 down against Georgia in the plate semi-final to win 26–19. England got the remaining two points as they home took the bowl final over Portugal.

== Pool stage ==
The pool stage was played on the first day of the tournament. The 16 teams were separated into four pools of four teams and teams in the same pool played each other once. The top two teams in each pool advanced to the Cup quarterfinals to compete for the 2001 Cardiff Sevens title.

Key to colours in group tables
Teams that advanced to the Cup quarterfinals
Teams that advanced to the Bowl quarterfinals

=== Pool A ===
Pos	Team	Pld	W	D	L	PF	PA	PD	Pts
1	New Zealand	3	3	0	0	114	5	+109	9
2	Argentina	3	2	0	1	46	41	+5	7
3	Portugal	3	1	0	2	29	65	−36	5
4	West Indies	3	0	0	3	24	102	−78	3

2 June 2001
13:00

New Zealand	24-0	Portugal

Rodney Parade, Newport

2 June 20011
13:20

Argentina	19–5	West Indies

Rodney Parade, Newport

2 June 2001
15:30

New Zealand	59–0	West Indies

Rodney Parade, Newport

2 June 2001
15:50

Argentina	22–5	Portugal

Rodney Parade, Newport

2 June 2001
17:20

Portugal	24–19	West Indies

Rodney Parade, Newport

2 June 2001
18:40

New Zealand	31–5	Argentina

Rodney Parade, Newport

=== Pool B ===
Pos	Team	Pld	W	D	L	PF	PA	PD	Pts
1	Australia	3	3	0	0	119	5	+114	9
2	Wales	3	2	0	1	50	57	−7	7
3	Canada	3	1	0	2	26	69	−43	5
4	Scotland	3	0	0	3	26	90	−64	3

2 June 2001
11:40

Canada	14-12	Scotland

Rodney Parade, Newport

2 June 20011
12:00

Australia	31–5	Wales

Rodney Parade, Newport

2 June 2001
14:30

Australia	50–0	Scotland

Rodney Parade, Newport

2 June 2001
16:10

Wales	19–12	Canada

Rodney Parade, Newport

2 June 2001
18:00

Australia	38–0	Canada

Rodney Parade, Newport

2 June 2001
19:00

Wales	26–14	Scotland

Rodney Parade, Newport

=== Pool C ===
Pos	Team	Pld	W	D	L	PF	PA	PD	Pts
1	Fiji	3	3	0	0	93	20	+73	9
2	Georgia	3	2	0	1	34	57	−23	7
3	England	3	0	1	2	46	55	−9	4
4	Spain	3	0	1	2	36	77	−41	4

2 June 2001
12:20

Fiji	33-0	Georgia

Rodney Parade, Newport

2 June 2001
12:40

England	19–19	Spain

Rodney Parade, Newport

2 June 2001
14:50

Fiji	41–5	Spain

Rodney Parade, Newport

2 June 2001
15:10

Georgia	17–12	England

Rodney Parade, Newport

2 June 2001
17:00

Georgia	17–12	Spain

Rodney Parade, Newport

2 June 2001
18:20

Fiji	19–15	England

Rodney Parade, Newport

=== Pool D ===
Pos	Team	Pld	W	D	L	PF	PA	PD	Pts
1	Samoa	3	3	0	0	101	17	+84	9
2	South Africa	3	2	0	1	72	42	+30	7
3	Russia	3	1	0	2	31	69	−38	5
4	France	3	0	0	3	14	90	−76	3

2 June 2001
11:00

Samoa	40-0	France

Rodney Parade, Newport

2 June 2001
11:20

South Africa	29–7	Russia

Rodney Parade, Newport

2 June 2001
13:50

Samoa	33–7	Russia

Rodney Parade, Newport

2 June 2001
14:10

South Africa	33–7	France

Rodney Parade, Newport

2 June 2001
16:40

Russia	17–7	France

Rodney Parade, Newport

2 June 2001
17:40

Samoa	28–10	South Africa

Rodney Parade, Newport

== Knockout stage ==
=== Bowl ===
Quarter-finals
3 June 2001 – Millennium Stadium
Portugal	19
Scotland	7
3 June 2001 – Millennium Stadium
Russia	21
Spain	26
3 June 2001 – Millennium Stadium
Canada	38
West Indies	10
3 June 2001 – Millennium Stadium
England	17
France	12

Semi-finals
3 June 2001 – Millennium Stadium
Portugal	21
Spain	19
3 June 2001 – Millennium Stadium
Canada	14
England	29

Final
3 June 2001 – Millennium Stadium
Portugal	26
England	35

=== Plate ===
Semi-finals
3 June 2001 – Millennium Stadium
Wales	26
Georgia	19
3 June 2001 – Millennium Stadium
Argentina	21
Fiji	28

Final
3 June 2001 – Millennium Stadium
Wales	14
Fiji	47

=== Cup ===
Quarter-finals
3 June 2001 – Millennium Stadium
New Zealand	29
Wales	0
3 June 2001 – Millennium Stadium
Samoa	38
Georgia	17
3 June 2001 – Millennium Stadium
Australia	49
Argentina	14
3 June 2001 – Millennium Stadium
Fiji	7
South Africa	28

Semi-finals
3 June 2001 – Millennium Stadium
New Zealand	24
Samoa	7
3 June 2001 – Millennium Stadium
Australia	21
South Africa	12

Final
3 June 2001 – Millennium Stadium
New Zealand	31
Australia	5

== Tournament placings ==
Place	Team	Points
1st place, gold medalist(s)	New Zealand	20
2nd place, silver medalist(s)	Australia	16
3rd place, bronze medalist(s)	Samoa	12
3rd place, bronze medalist(s)	South Africa	12
5	Fiji	8
6	Wales	6
7	Argentina	4
7	Georgia	4

Place	Team	Points
9	England	2
10	Portugal	0
11	Canada	0
11	Spain	0
13	France	0
13	Russia	0
13	Scotland	0
13	West Indies	0

Source: World Rugby

== Series standings ==
At the completion of Round 9:

Pos.	Event Team	Durban	Dubai	Wellington	Hong Kong	Shanghai	Kuala Lumpur	Tokyo	London	Cardiff	Points total
1	New Zealand	20	20	4	30	12	16	20	20	20	162
2	Australia	12	12	20	18	20	20	16	16	16	150
3	Fiji	16	16	16	24	8	12	12	12	8	124
4	Samoa	6	12	8	18	4	8	12	12	12	92
5	South Africa	8	8	2	8	16	12	8	8	12	82
6	Argentina	12	6	6	8	4	4	2	4	4	50
7	England	0	4	0	8	6	0	6	6	2	32
8	Canada	4	0	4	8	2	0	4	4	0	26
9	Wales	0	0	0	3	0	4	4	2	6	19
10	United States	–	–	12	4	–	–	0	–	–	16
11	South Korea	–	–	–	0	12	2	0	–	–	14
12	France	4	–	–	2	–	6	0	0	0	12
13	Cook Islands	–	–	12	–	–	–	–	–	–	12
14	Zimbabwe	0	4	–	–	–	–	–	–	–	4
15	Portugal	2	–	–	2	–	–	–	0	0	4
16	Georgia	0	0	–	–	–	–	–	0	4	4
17	Ireland	–	2	–	–	–	–	–	–	–	2
18	Hong Kong	–	0	–	1	0	–	0	–	–	1
19	Japan	–	–	0	0	0	0	0	–	–	0
20	Chinese Taipei	–	–	–	0	0	0	0	–	–	0
20	Malaysia	–	–	–	0	0	0	0	–	–	0
22	China	–	–	0	0	0	–	–	–	–	0
22	Russia	–	–	–	0	–	–	–	0	0	0
24	(Cooperation Council for the Arab States of the Gulf) Arabian Gulf	–	0	–	0	–	–	–	–	–	0
24	Kenya	0	0	–	–	–	–	–	–	–	0
24	Morocco	0	0	–	–	–	–	–	–	–	0
24	Scotland	–	–	–	–	–	–	–	0	0	0
24	Singapore	–	–	–	0	–	0	–	–	–	0
24	Sri Lanka	–	–	–	0	0	–	–	–	–	0
24	Thailand	–	–	–	0	–	0	–	–	–	0
31	Namibia	0	–	–	–	–	–	–	–	–	0
31	Niue	–	–	0	–	–	–	–	–	–	0
31	Papua New Guinea	–	–	0	–	–	–	–	–	–	0
31	Spain	–	–	–	–	–	–	–	–	0	0
31	Tonga	–	–	0	–	–	–	–	–	–	0
31	West Indies	–	–	–	0	–	–	–	0	0	0

Source: world.rugby (archived)

IRB Sevens II
Preceded by 2001 London Sevens	2001 Cardiff Sevens	Succeeded by —
Cardiff Sevens
Preceded by —	2001 Cardiff Sevens	Succeeded by 2002 Cardiff Sevens
