= 2001 Hong Kong Sevens =

International rugby sevens tournament

- IRB Sevens II
- Host nation: Hong Kong
- Date: 9–10 February 2001

Cup
- Champion: New Zealand
- Runner-up: Fiji

Plate
- Winner: United States
- Runner-up: Wales

Bowl
- Winner: Hong Kong
- Runner-up: West Indies

Tournament details
- Matches played: 44

The 2001 Hong Kong Sevens was an international rugby sevens tournament that was held in Hong Kong as the fourth leg of the 2000–01 World Sevens Series. The tournament took place at the Hong Kong Stadium on 30 March–1 April 2001.

The hosts, Hong Kong, finished third in Pool C but went on to defeat the West Indies 47–5 in the Bowl final. Defending World Sevens Series champions, New Zealand, successfully defended their Hong Kong Sevens title by defeating Fiji 29–5 in the Cup final.

== Format ==
The teams were drawn into six pools of four teams each. Each team played the other teams in their pool once, with 3 points awarded for a win, 2 points for a draw, and 1 point for a loss (no points awarded for a forfeit). The pool stage was played over the first two days of the tournament. The top team from each pool along with the two best runners-up advanced to the Cup quarter finals. The remaining four runners-up along with the four best third-placed teams advanced to the Plate quarter finals. The remaining eight teams went on to the Bowl quarter finals. No Shield trophy was on offer in the 2000–01 season.

== Teams ==
Like the previous tournament in Hong Kong, 24 teams took part with Russia and the West Indies making their World Sevens Series debuts. The participating teams for the tournament:

- (Cooperation Council for the Arab States of the Gulf) Arabian Gulf
- Argentina
- Australia
- Canada
- China
- Chinese Taipei
- England
- Fiji
- France
- Hong Kong
- Japan
- Malaysia
- New Zealand
- Portugal
- Russia
- Samoa
- Singapore
- South Africa
- South Korea
- Sri Lanka
- Thailand
- United States
- Wales
- West Indies

== Pool stage ==
Key to colours in group tables
Teams that advanced to the Cup quarterfinals
Teams that advanced to the Plate quarterfinals
Teams that advanced to the Bowl quarterfinals

=== Pool A ===
Pos	Team	Pld	W	D	L	PF	PA	PD	Pts
1	Fiji	3	2	1	0	67	15	+52	8
2	Wales	3	2	0	1	66	22	+44	7
3	Russia	3	1	1	1	53	36	+17	6
4	West Indies	3	0	0	3	12	125	−113	3

Source: World Rugby

30 March 2001

Fiji	47–0	West Indies

Hong Kong Stadium, Hong Kong

30 March 2001

Wales	14–12	Russia

Hong Kong Stadium, Hong Kong

31 March 2001

Wales	47–0	West Indies

Hong Kong Stadium, Hong Kong

31 March 2001

Fiji	10–10	Russia

Hong Kong Stadium, Hong Kong

31 March 2001

Russia	31–12	West Indies

Hong Kong Stadium, Hong Kong

31 March 2001

Fiji	10–5	Wales

Hong Kong Stadium, Hong Kong

Source: World Rugby

=== Pool B ===
Pos	Team	Pld	W	D	L	PF	PA	PD	Pts
1	Australia	3	3	0	0	138	14	+124	9
2	Portugal	3	2	0	1	73	52	+21	7
3	South Korea	3	1	0	2	63	74	−11	5
4	Sri Lanka	3	0	0	3	7	141	−134	3

Source: World Rugby

30 March 2001

Australia	64–0	Sri Lanka

Hong Kong Stadium, Hong Kong

30 March 2001

Portugal	38–7	South Korea

Hong Kong Stadium, Hong Kong

31 March 2001

Portugal	28–7	Sri Lanka

Hong Kong Stadium, Hong Kong

31 March 2001

Australia	36–7	South Korea

Hong Kong Stadium, Hong Kong

31 March 2001

South Korea	49–0	Sri Lanka

Hong Kong Stadium, Hong Kong

31 March 2001

Australia	38–7	Portugal

Hong Kong Stadium, Hong Kong

Source: World Rugby

=== Pool C ===
Pos	Team	Pld	W	D	L	PF	PA	PD	Pts
1	New Zealand	3	3	0	0	108	12	+96	9
2	France	3	2	0	1	46	46	0	7
3	Hong Kong	3	1	0	2	19	62	−43	5
4	(Cooperation Council for the Arab States of the Gulf) Arabian Gulf	3	0	0	3	26	79	−53	3

Source: World Rugby

30 March 2001

New Zealand	43–5	(Cooperation Council for the Arab States of the Gulf) Arabian Gulf

Hong Kong Stadium, Hong Kong

30 March 2001

France	17–5	Hong Kong

Hong Kong Stadium, Hong Kong

31 March 2001

France	22–14	(Cooperation Council for the Arab States of the Gulf) Arabian Gulf

Hong Kong Stadium, Hong Kong

31 March 2001

New Zealand	38–0	Hong Kong

Hong Kong Stadium, Hong Kong

31 March 2001

Hong Kong	14–7	(Cooperation Council for the Arab States of the Gulf) Arabian Gulf

Hong Kong Stadium, Hong Kong

31 March 2001

New Zealand	27–7	France

Hong Kong Stadium, Hong Kong

Source: World Rugby

=== Pool D ===
Pos	Team	Pld	W	D	L	PF	PA	PD	Pts
1	Samoa	3	3	0	0	112	0	+112	9
2	England	3	2	0	1	94	47	+47	7
3	Japan	3	1	0	2	63	77	−14	5
4	Singapore	3	0	0	3	5	150	−145	3

Source: World Rugby

30 March 2001

Samoa	35–0	Singapore

Hong Kong Stadium, Hong Kong

30 March 2001

England	28–14	Japan

Hong Kong Stadium, Hong Kong

31 March 2001

England	66–5	Singapore

Hong Kong Stadium, Hong Kong

31 March 2001

Samoa	49–0	Japan

Hong Kong Stadium, Hong Kong

31 March 2001

Japan	49–0	Singapore

Hong Kong Stadium, Hong Kong

31 March 2001

Samoa	28–0	England

Hong Kong Stadium, Hong Kong

Source: World Rugby

=== Pool E ===
Pos	Team	Pld	W	D	L	PF	PA	PD	Pts
1	Canada	3	3	0	0	132	17	+115	9
2	Argentina	3	2	0	1	100	33	+67	7
3	China	3	1	0	2	54	79	−25	5
4	Malaysia	3	0	0	3	5	162	−157	3

Source: World Rugby

30 March 2001

Argentina	66–0	Malaysia

Hong Kong Stadium, Hong Kong

30 March 2001

Canada	50–7	China

Hong Kong Stadium, Hong Kong

31 March 2001

Canada	56–0	Malaysia

Hong Kong Stadium, Hong Kong

31 March 2001

Argentina	24–7	China

Hong Kong Stadium, Hong Kong

31 March 2001

China	40–5	Malaysia

Hong Kong Stadium, Hong Kong

31 March 2001

Argentina	10–26	Canada

Hong Kong Stadium, Hong Kong

Source: World Rugby

=== Pool F ===
Pos	Team	Pld	W	D	L	PF	PA	PD	Pts
1	South Africa	3	3	0	0	93	7	+86	9
2	United States	3	2	0	1	55	34	+21	7
3	Chinese Taipei	3	1	0	2	33	59	−26	5
4	Thailand	3	0	0	3	28	109	−81	3

Source: World Rugby

30 March 2001

South Africa	43–7	Thailand

Hong Kong Stadium, Hong Kong

30 March 2001

United States	17–5	Chinese Taipei

Hong Kong Stadium, Hong Kong

31 March 2001

United States	38–7	Thailand

Hong Kong Stadium, Hong Kong

31 March 2001

South Africa	28–0	Chinese Taipei

Hong Kong Stadium, Hong Kong

31 March 2001

Chinese Taipei	28–14	Thailand

Hong Kong Stadium, Hong Kong

31 March 2001

South Africa	22–0	United States

Hong Kong Stadium, Hong Kong

Source: World Rugby

== Knockout stage ==
=== Bowl ===
Quarter-finals
1 April 2001 – Hong Kong Stadium
Chinese Taipei	38
Malaysia	0
1 April 2001 – Hong Kong Stadium
West Indies	34
Thailand	26
1 April 2001 – Hong Kong Stadium
(Cooperation Council for the Arab States of the Gulf) Arabian Gulf	22
Sri Lanka	0
1 April 2001 – Hong Kong Stadium
Singapore	7
Hong Kong	22

Semi-finals
1 April 2001 – Hong Kong Stadium
Chinese Taipei	12
West Indies	19
1 April 2001 – Hong Kong Stadium
(Cooperation Council for the Arab States of the Gulf) Arabian Gulf	14
Hong Kong	19

Final
1 April 2001 – Hong Kong Stadium
West Indies	5
Hong Kong	47

Source: World Rugby

=== Plate ===
Quarter-finals
1 April 2001 – Hong Kong Stadium
Wales	43
China	0
1 April 2001 – Hong Kong Stadium
Russia	10
France	14
1 April 2001 – Hong Kong Stadium
United States	14
South Korea	10
1 April 2001 – Hong Kong Stadium
Japan	0
Portugal	26

Semi-finals
1 April 2001 – Hong Kong Stadium
Wales	24
France	7
1 April 2001 – Hong Kong Stadium
United States	24
Portugal	19

Final
1 April 2001 – Hong Kong Stadium
Wales	26
United States	31

Source: World Rugby

=== Cup ===
Quarter-finals
1 April 2001 – Hong Kong Stadium
Fiji	22
England	7
1 April 2001 – Hong Kong Stadium
Canada	0
Samoa	26
1 April 2001 – Hong Kong Stadium
New Zealand	19
South Africa	0
1 April 2001 – Hong Kong Stadium
Argentina	7
Australia	35

Semi-finals
1 April 2001 – Hong Kong Stadium
Fiji	12
Samoa	10
1 April 2001 – Hong Kong Stadium
New Zealand	14
Australia	12

Final
1 April 2001 – Hong Kong Stadium
Fiji	5
New Zealand	29

Source: World Rugby

== Tournament placings ==
Place	Team	Points
1st place, gold medalist(s)	New Zealand	30
2nd place, silver medalist(s)	Fiji	24
3rd place, bronze medalist(s)	Australia	18
3rd place, bronze medalist(s)	Samoa	18
5	Argentina	8
5	Canada	8
5	England	8
5	South Africa	8
9	United States	4
10	Wales	3
11	France	2
11	Portugal	2

Place	Team	Points
13	China	0
13	Japan	0
13	Russia	0
13	South Korea	0
17	Hong Kong	1
18	West Indies	0
19	(Cooperation Council for the Arab States of the Gulf) Arabian Gulf	0
19	Chinese Taipei	0
21	Malaysia	0
21	Singapore	0
21	Sri Lanka	0
21	Thailand	0

Source: Rugby7.com

== Series standings ==
At the completion of Round 4:

Pos.	Event Team	Durban	Dubai	Wellington	Hong Kong	Shanghai	Kuala Lumpur	Tokyo	London	Cardiff	Points total
1	New Zealand	20	20	4	30						74
2	Fiji	16	16	16	24						72
3	Australia	12	12	20	18						62
4	Samoa	6	12	8	18						44
5	Argentina	12	6	6	8						32
6	South Africa	8	8	2	8						26
7	United States	—	—	12	4						16
8	Canada	4	0	4	8						16
9	Cook Islands	—	—	12	—						12
10	England	0	4	0	8						12
11	France	4	—	—	2						6
12	Zimbabwe	0	4	—	—						4
13	Portugal	2	—	—	2						4
14	Wales	0	0	0	3						3
15	Ireland	—	2	—	—						2
16	Hong Kong	—	0	—	1						1
17	(Cooperation Council for the Arab States of the Gulf) Arabian Gulf	—	0	—	0						0
17	China	—	—	0	0						0
17	Georgia	0	0	—	—						0
17	Japan	—	—	0	0						0
17	Kenya	0	0	—	—						0
17	Morocco	0	0	—	—						0
23	Chinese Taipei	—	—	—	0						0
23	Malaysia	—	—	—	0						0
23	Namibia	0	—	—	—						0
23	Niue	—	—	0	—						0
23	Papua New Guinea	—	—	0	—						0
23	Russia	—	—	—	0						0
23	Singapore	—	—	—	0						0
23	South Korea	—	—	—	0						0
23	Sri Lanka	—	—	—	0						0
23	Thailand	—	—	—	0						0
23	Tonga	—	—	0	—						0
23	West Indies	—	—	—	0						0

Source: Rugby7.com

IRB Sevens II
Preceded by 2001 Brisbane Sevens	2001 Hong Kong Sevens Sevens	Succeeded by 2001 Shanghai Sevens
Hong Kong Sevens
Preceded by 2000 Hong Kong Sevens	2001 Hong Kong Sevens	Succeeded by 2002 Hong Kong Sevens
