= 2000 Dubai Sevens =

- IRB Sevens II
- Host nation: UAE
- Date: 23–24 November 2000

Cup
- Champion: New Zealand
- Runner-up: Fiji

Plate
- Winner: South Africa
- Runner-up: Argentina

Bowl
- Winner: Ireland
- Runner-up: Morocco

Tournament details
- Matches played: 41

The 2000 Dubai Sevens was an international rugby sevens tournament that was the second leg of the 2000–01 World Sevens Series. The Dubai Sevens took place at the Dubai Exiles Rugby Ground on 23–24 November 2000.

The hosts, Arabian Gulf, were defeated 43–17 by Ireland in the Bowl quarterfinals whilst defending World Sevens Series champions New Zealand won their third straight Sevens title by defeating Fiji 38–12 in the Cup final.

== Format ==
The teams were drawn into four pools of four teams each. Each team played the other three in their pool once, with 3 points awarded for a win, 2 points for a draw, and 1 point for a loss (no points awarded for a forfeit). The pool stage was played on the first day of the tournament. The top two teams from each pool advanced to the Cup/Plate brackets. The bottom two teams from each pool went on to the Bowl bracket. No Shield trophy was on offer in the 2000-01 season.

== Teams ==
The 16 participating teams for the tournament:

- (Cooperation Council for the Arab States of the Gulf) Arabian Gulf
- Argentina
- Australia
- Canada
- England
- Fiji
- Georgia
- Hong Kong
- Ireland
- Kenya
- Morocco
- New Zealand
- Samoa
- South Africa
- Wales
- Zimbabwe

== Pool stage ==
Key to colours in group tables
Teams that advanced to the Cup quarterfinals
Teams that advanced to the Bowl quarterfinals

=== Pool A ===
Pos	Team	Pld	W	D	L	PF	PA	PD	Pts
1	New Zealand	3	3	0	0	136	17	119	9
2	England	3	2	0	1	65	52	13	7
3	Georgia	3	1	0	2	53	92	-39	5
4	(Cooperation Council for the Arab States of the Gulf) Arabian Gulf	3	0	0	3	7	100	-93	3

Source: World Rugby

23 November 2000

New Zealand	54–10	Georgia

Dubai Exiles Rugby Ground, Dubai

23 November 2000

England	27–0	(Cooperation Council for the Arab States of the Gulf) Arabian Gulf

Dubai Exiles Rugby Ground, Dubai

23 November 2000

New Zealand	42–0	(Cooperation Council for the Arab States of the Gulf) Arabian Gulf

Dubai Exiles Rugby Ground, Dubai

23 November 2000

England	31–12	Georgia

Dubai Exiles Rugby Ground, Dubai

23 November 2000

Georgia	31–7	(Cooperation Council for the Arab States of the Gulf) Arabian Gulf

Dubai Exiles Rugby Ground, Dubai

23 November 2000

New Zealand	40–7	England

Dubai Exiles Rugby Ground, Dubai

Source: World Rugby

=== Pool B ===
Pos	Team	Pld	W	D	L	PF	PA	PD	Pts
1	Fiji	3	3	0	0	132	5	127	9
2	Argentina	3	2	0	1	55	66	-11	7
3	Ireland	3	1	0	2	43	101	-58	5
4	Morocco	3	0	0	3	33	91	-58	3

Source: World Rugby

23 November 2000

Fiji	56–0	Ireland

Dubai Exiles Rugby Ground, Dubai

23 November 2000

Argentina	24–14	Morocco

Dubai Exiles Rugby Ground, Dubai

23 November 2000

Fiji	43–0	Morocco

Dubai Exiles Rugby Ground, Dubai

23 November 2000

Argentina	26–19	Ireland

Dubai Exiles Rugby Ground, Dubai

23 November 2000

Ireland	24–19	Morocco

Dubai Exiles Rugby Ground, Dubai

23 November 2000

Fiji	33–5	Argentina

Dubai Exiles Rugby Ground, Dubai

Source: World Rugby

=== Pool C ===
Pos	Team	Pld	W	D	L	PF	PA	PD	Pts
1	Australia	3	3	0	0	128	5	123	9
2	Samoa	3	2	0	1	75	41	34	7
3	Hong Kong	3	1	0	2	33	101	-68	5
4	Kenya	3	0	0	3	17	106	-89	3

Source: World Rugby

23 November 2000

Australia	54–0	Hong Kong

Dubai Exiles Rugby Ground, Dubai

23 November 2000

Samoa	40–0	Kenya

Dubai Exiles Rugby Ground, Dubai

23 November 2000

Australia	45–5	Kenya

Dubai Exiles Rugby Ground, Dubai

23 November 2000

Samoa	35–12	Hong Kong

Dubai Exiles Rugby Ground, Dubai

23 November 2000

Hong Kong	21–12	Kenya

Dubai Exiles Rugby Ground, Dubai

23 November 2000

Australia	29–0	Samoa

Dubai Exiles Rugby Ground, Dubai

Source: World Rugby

=== Pool D ===
Pos	Team	Pld	W	D	L	PF	PA	PD	Pts
1	Zimbabwe	3	3	0	0	83	55	28	9
2	South Africa	3	2	0	1	76	57	19	7
3	Canada	3	1	0	2	67	63	4	5
4	Wales	3	0	0	3	40	91	-51	3

Source: World Rugby

23 November 2000

South Africa	24–14	Wales

Dubai Exiles Rugby Ground, Dubai

23 November 2000

Canada	19–21	Zimbabwe

Dubai Exiles Rugby Ground, Dubai

23 November 2000

South Africa	24–26	Zimbabwe

Dubai Exiles Rugby Ground, Dubai

23 November 2000

Canada	31–14	Wales

Dubai Exiles Rugby Ground, Dubai

23 November 2000

Wales	12–36	Zimbabwe

Dubai Exiles Rugby Ground, Dubai

23 November 2000

South Africa	28–17	Canada

Dubai Exiles Rugby Ground, Dubai

Source: World Rugby

== Knockout stage ==
=== Bowl ===
Quarter-finals
24 November 2000 – Dubai Exiles Rugby Ground
Georgia	7
Morocco	14
24 November 2000 – Dubai Exiles Rugby Ground
Canada	38
Kenya	7
24 November 2000 – Dubai Exiles Rugby Ground
Hong Kong	12
Wales	19
24 November 2000 – Dubai Exiles Rugby Ground
Ireland	43
(Cooperation Council for the Arab States of the Gulf) Arabian Gulf	17

Semi-finals
24 November 2000 – Dubai Exiles Rugby Ground
Morocco	14
Canada	10
24 November 2000 – Dubai Exiles Rugby Ground
Wales	17
Ireland	19

Final
24 November 2000 – Dubai Exiles Rugby Ground
Morocco	19
Ireland	27

Source: World Rugby

=== Plate ===
Semi-finals
24 November 2000 – Dubai Exiles Rugby Ground
Argentina	24
Zimbabwe	12
24 November 2000 – Dubai Exiles Rugby Ground
South Africa	45
England	0

Final
24 November 2000 – Dubai Exiles Rugby Ground
Argentina	12
South Africa	14

Source: World Rugby

=== Cup ===
Quarter-finals
24 November 2000 – Dubai Exiles Rugby Ground
New Zealand	33
Argentina	7
24 November 2000 – Dubai Exiles Rugby Ground
Zimbabwe	10
Samoa	33
24 November 2000 – Dubai Exiles Rugby Ground
Australia	26
South Africa	12
24 November 2000 – Dubai Exiles Rugby Ground
Fiji	43
England	0

Semi-finals
24 November 2000 – Dubai Exiles Rugby Ground
New Zealand	26
Samoa	0
24 November 2000 – Dubai Exiles Rugby Ground
Australia	12
Fiji	31

Final
24 November 2000 – Dubai Exiles Rugby Ground
New Zealand	38
Fiji	12

Source: World Rugby

== Tournament placings ==
Place	Team	Points
1st place, gold medalist(s)	New Zealand	20
2nd place, silver medalist(s)	Fiji	16
3rd place, bronze medalist(s)	Australia	12
3rd place, bronze medalist(s)	Samoa	12
5	South Africa	8
6	Argentina	6
7	England	4
7	Zimbabwe	4

Place	Team	Points
9	Ireland	2
10	Morocco	0
11	Canada	0
11	Wales	0
13	(Cooperation Council for the Arab States of the Gulf) Arabian Gulf	0
13	Georgia	0
13	Hong Kong	0
13	Kenya	0

Source: Rugby7.com

== Series standings ==
At the completion of Round 2:

Pos.	Event Team	Durban	Dubai	Wellington	Brisbane	Hong Kong	Shanghai	Kuala Lumpur	Tokyo	London	Cardiff	Points total
1	New Zealand	20	20									40
2	Fiji	16	16									32
3	Australia	12	12									24
4	Argentina	12	6									18
4	Samoa	6	12									18
6	South Africa	8	8									16
7	Canada	4	0									4
7	England	0	4									4
7	Zimbabwe	0	4									4
10	France	4	—									4
11	Ireland	—	2									2
11	Portugal	2	—									2
13	Georgia	0	0									0
13	Kenya	0	0									0
13	Morocco	0	0									0
13	Wales	0	0									0
17	(Cooperation Council for the Arab States of the Gulf) Arabian Gulf	—	0									0
17	Hong Kong	—	0									0
17	Namibia	0	—									0

Source: Rugby7.com

IRB Sevens II
Preceded by 2000 Durban Sevens	2000 Dubai Sevens Sevens	Succeeded by 2001 Wellington Sevens
Dubai Sevens
Preceded by 1999 Dubai Sevens	2000 Dubai Sevens	Succeeded by 2001 Dubai Sevens
