= 2001 Wellington Sevens =

- IRB Sevens II
- Host nation: New Zealand
- Date: 9–10 February 2001

Cup
- Champion: Australia
- Runner-up: Fiji

Plate
- Winner: Samoa
- Runner-up: Argentina

Bowl
- Winner: South Africa
- Runner-up: Wales

Shield
- Winner: Japan
- Runner-up: Papua New Guinea

Tournament details
- Matches played: 44

The 2001 Wellington Sevens, also known as the 2001 New Zealand Sevens, was an international rugby sevens tournament that was held in Wellington, New Zealand as the third leg of the 2000–01 World Sevens Series. The tournament took place at the Westpac Stadium on 9–10 February 2001.

The hosts, New Zealand, lost their first match of the season as they were defeated 19–17 by defending Wellington Sevens champions Fiji in the Cup quarterfinals. This was only the second time that a New Zealand sevens side had failed to reach the Cup final of World Sevens Series event. This was also the first event to hold a Shield competition which was won by Japan who defeated Papua New Guinea 27–19 in the final.

Australia became only the third nation to win a World Sevens Series title as they defeated Fiji 19–17 in the Cup final.

== Format ==
The teams were drawn into four pools of four teams each. Each team played the other teams in their pool once, with 3 points awarded for a win, 2 points for a draw, and 1 point for a loss (no points awarded for a forfeit). The pool stage was played on the first day of the tournament. The top two teams from each pool advanced to the Cup/Plate brackets. The bottom two teams from each group went to the Bowl/Shield brackets.

== Teams ==
The 16 participating teams for the tournament:

- Argentina
- Australia
- Canada
- China
- Cook Islands
- England
- Fiji
- Japan
- New Zealand
- Niue
- Papua New Guinea
- Samoa
- South Africa
- Tonga
- Wales
- Zimbabwe

Niue was invited to replace France after they withdrew from the tournament due to French clubs not releasing players.

== Pool stage ==
Key to colours in group tables
Teams that advanced to the Cup quarterfinals
Teams that advanced to the Bowl quarterfinals

=== Pool A ===
Pos	Team	Pld	W	D	L	PF	PA	PD	Pts
1	New Zealand	3	3	0	0	120	0	120	9
2	Canada	3	2	0	1	47	57	-10	7
3	Tonga	3	1	0	2	45	57	-12	5
4	Niue	3	0	0	3	26	124	-98	3

Source: World Rugby

9 February 2001

New Zealand	31–0	Tonga

Westpac Stadium, Wellington

9 February 2001

Canada	33–14	Niue

Westpac Stadium, Wellington

9 February 2001

New Zealand	51–0	Niue

Westpac Stadium, Wellington

9 February 2001

Canada	14–5	Tonga

Westpac Stadium, Wellington

9 February 2001

Tonga	40–12	Niue

Westpac Stadium, Wellington

9 February 2001

New Zealand	38–0	Canada

Westpac Stadium, Wellington

Source: World Rugby

=== Pool B ===
Pos	Team	Pld	W	D	L	PF	PA	PD	Pts
1	United States	3	3	0	0	60	27	33	9
2	Fiji	3	2	0	1	112	17	95	7
3	England	3	1	0	2	50	72	-22	5
4	China	3	0	0	3	19	125	-106	3

Source: World Rugby

9 February 2001

United States	12–10	Fiji

Westpac Stadium, Wellington

9 February 2001

England	33–14	China

Westpac Stadium, Wellington

9 February 2001

Fiji	61–0	China

Westpac Stadium, Wellington

9 February 2001

United States	17–12	England

Westpac Stadium, Wellington

9 February 2001

United States	31–5	China

Westpac Stadium, Wellington

9 February 2001

Fiji	41–5	England

Westpac Stadium, Wellington

Source: World Rugby

=== Pool C ===
Pos	Team	Pld	W	D	L	PF	PA	PD	Pts
1	Australia	3	3	0	0	113	10	103	9
2	Cook Islands	3	2	0	1	50	62	-12	7
3	South Africa	3	1	0	2	54	47	7	5
4	Japan	3	0	0	3	22	120	-98	3

Source: World Rugby

9 February 2001

Australia	43–5	Cook Islands

Westpac Stadium, Wellington

9 February 2001

South Africa	47–5	Japan

Westpac Stadium, Wellington

9 February 2001

Australia	45–5	Japan

Westpac Stadium, Wellington

9 February 2001

Cook Islands	17–7	South Africa

Westpac Stadium, Wellington

9 February 2001

Cook Islands	28–12	Japan

Westpac Stadium, Wellington

9 February 2001

Australia	25–0	South Africa

Westpac Stadium, Wellington

Source: World Rugby

=== Pool D ===
Pos	Team	Pld	W	D	L	PF	PA	PD	Pts
1	Samoa	3	3	0	0	108	17	91	9
2	Argentina	3	2	0	1	52	47	5	7
3	Wales	3	1	0	2	48	70	-22	5
4	Papua New Guinea	3	0	0	3	19	93	-74	3

Source: World Rugby

9 February 2001

Argentina	21–14	Wales

Westpac Stadium, Wellington

9 February 2001

Samoa	40–5	Papua New Guinea

Westpac Stadium, Wellington

9 February 2001

Argentina	31–0	Papua New Guinea

Westpac Stadium, Wellington

9 February 2001

Samoa	35–12	Wales

Westpac Stadium, Wellington

9 February 2001

Wales	22–14	Papua New Guinea

Westpac Stadium, Wellington

9 February 2001

Samoa	33–0	Argentina

Westpac Stadium, Wellington

Source: World Rugby

== Knockout stage ==
=== Shield ===
Semi-finals
10 February 2001 – Westpac Stadium
China	7
Japan	21
10 February 2001 – Westpac Stadium
Papua New Guinea	45
Niue	0

Final
10 February 2001 – Westpac Stadium
Japan	27
Papua New Guinea	19

Source: World Rugby

=== Bowl ===
Quarter-finals
10 February 2001 – Westpac Stadium
Tonga	45
China	7
10 February 2001 – Westpac Stadium
Wales	26
Japan	10
10 February 2001 – Westpac Stadium
South Africa	26
Papua New Guinea	7
10 February 2001 – Westpac Stadium
England	22
Niue	7

Semi-finals
10 February 2001 – Westpac Stadium
Tonga	17
Wales	19
10 February 2001 – Westpac Stadium
South Africa	31
England	12

Final
10 February 2001 – Westpac Stadium
Wales	17
South Africa	47

Source: World Rugby

=== Plate ===
Semi-finals
10 February 2001 – Westpac Stadium
New Zealand	12
Samoa	21
10 February 2001 – Westpac Stadium
Argentina	21
Canada	0

Final
10 February 2001 – Westpac Stadium
Samoa	40
Argentina	7

Source: World Rugby

=== Cup ===
Quarter-finals
10 February 2001 – Westpac Stadium
Fiji	19
New Zealand	17
10 February 2001 – Westpac Stadium
Cook Islands	10
Samoa	7
10 February 2001 – Westpac Stadium
Australia	26
Argentina	17
10 February 2001 – Westpac Stadium
United States	12
Canada	10

Semi-finals
10 February 2001 – Westpac Stadium
Fiji	27
Cook Islands	12
10 February 2001 – Westpac Stadium
Australia	36
United States	5

Final
10 February 2001 – Westpac Stadium
Fiji	17
Australia	19

Source: World Rugby

== Tournament placings ==
Place	Team	Points
1st place, gold medalist(s)	Australia	20
2nd place, silver medalist(s)	Fiji	16
3rd place, bronze medalist(s)	Cook Islands	12
3rd place, bronze medalist(s)	United States	12
5	Samoa	8
6	Argentina	6
7	Canada	4
7	New Zealand	4

Place	Team	Points
9	South Africa	2
10	Wales	0
11	England	0
11	Tonga	0
13	Japan	0
14	Papua New Guinea	0
15	China	0
15	Niue	0

Source: Rugby7.com

== Series standings ==
At the completion of Round 3:

Pos.	Event Team	Durban	Dubai	Wellington	Brisbane	Hong Kong	Shanghai	Kuala Lumpur	Tokyo	London	Cardiff	Points total
1	Fiji	16	16	16								48
2	New Zealand	20	20	4								44
3	Australia	12	12	20								44
4	Samoa	6	12	8								26
5	Argentina	12	6	6								24
6	South Africa	8	8	2								18
7	Cook Islands	—	—	12								12
7	United States	—	—	12								12
9	Canada	4	0	4								8
10	England	0	4	0								4
11	Zimbabwe	0	4	—								4
12	France	4	—	—								4
13	Ireland	—	2	—								2
13	Portugal	2	—	—								2
15	Wales	0	0	0								0
16	Georgia	0	0	—								0
16	Kenya	0	0	—								0
16	Morocco	0	0	—								0
19	(Cooperation Council for the Arab States of the Gulf) Arabian Gulf	—	0	—								0
19	China	—	—	0								0
19	Hong Kong	—	0	—								0
19	Japan	—	—	0								0
19	Namibia	0	—	—								0
19	Niue	—	—	0								0
19	Papua New Guinea	—	—	0								0
19	Tonga	—	—	0								0

Source: Rugby7.com

IRB Sevens II
Preceded by 2000 Dubai Sevens	2001 Wellington Sevens Sevens	Succeeded by 2001 Brisbane Sevens
New Zealand Sevens
Preceded by 2000 Wellington Sevens	2001 Wellington Sevens	Succeeded by 2002 Wellington Sevens
