= Namibia national rugby team =

Namibia national rugby team can refer to:

- Namibia national rugby union team
- Namibia national rugby sevens team
