= 1993 Rugby World Cup Sevens qualifying =

Rugby tournament

Of the twenty-four nations involved in 1993 Rugby World Cup Sevens, nineteen were invited and five had to go through pre-tournament 1993 Rugby World Cup Sevens qualifying. Four of the qualification places were won by Namibia, Hong Kong, Taiwan and Spain who booked their places by reaching the semi-finals of one qualifying event in Sicily. Latvia won their place by beating Russia in the final of a mini-tournament staged in Moscow to decide who would replace the USSR, which had broken up since its invite to the world cup.

The invited participants were Argentina, Australia, Canada, England, Fiji, France, Ireland, Italy, Japan, Netherlands, New Zealand, Romania, Scotland, Tonga, South Africa, South Korea, USA, Wales and Western Samoa.

== Sicily (1992) ==
Seventeen nations came to Catania, Sicily, in May 1992 (from 29th to 31st) to battle for four qualifying spots in the finals in 1993. They were divided into three groups, five in one and six in the other two. Taiwan, Namibia, Spain and Hong Kong were the successful qualifiers after three group stages and three knockout rounds. The affair was complicated and confused. The group stages produced a situation where, by the transition from the second to the third groups, the lower ranked teams were better off losing to one another in order to face weaker opposition in stage 3. Also, the two teams with the best records leading into the quarter-finals, Namibia (played 8 won 8) and Zimbabwe (played 9 won 7, drawn 1, lost 1) ended up playing each other. Meanwhile, a Czechoslovak side that had won just one match made it to the quarterfinals at the expense of Tunisia that had won 5 of 9.

Determination of Pool Winners: All matches in the tournament carry the following points A Win 3 points, A Draw 2 points, A Loss 1 point. The team with the greatest number of points at the end of preliminary rounds would declared the winner. if teams at this stage are level on points then the winner shall be: (a) the winner of the match in which tied teams played. (b) the team that scored the most tries throughout the Round . (c) the team which has conceded the fewest tries throughout the Round. (d) the total points scored by each team in all matches in the Round shall be divided by total points scored against each team and the team with the higher quotient shall be the winner. Teams eliminated on either group stage participated in the Etna Cup mini-tournament alongside an invitational Sicily side.

The original groups were as follows:

=== Group stage 1 ===
Legend
Advances to Group Stages 2 and 3
Eliminated to Etna Cup round 1

Pool A

Teams	Pld	W	D	L	PF	PA	+/−	Pts
Namibia	4	4	0	0	122	6	+116	12
Sweden	4	3	0	1	54	58	−4	10
Portugal	4	2	0	2	43	52	−9	8
Poland	4	1	0	3	19	55	−36	6
(Cooperation Council for the Arab States of the Gulf) Arabian Gulf	4	0	0	4	22	89	−67	4

Matches

29 May 1992

Namibia	18−0	Poland

29 May 1992

Portugal	10−16	Sweden

29 May 1992

Poland	13−6	(Cooperation Council for the Arab States of the Gulf) Arabian Gulf

29 May 1992

Namibia	24−6	Portugal

29 May 1992

Sweden	16−10	(Cooperation Council for the Arab States of the Gulf) Arabian Gulf

29 May 1992

Poland	6−9	Portugal

29 May 1992

Namibia	38−0	Sweden

29 May 1992

Portugal	18−6	(Cooperation Council for the Arab States of the Gulf) Arabian Gulf

29 May 1992

Poland	0−22	Sweden

29 May 1992

Namibia	42−0	(Cooperation Council for the Arab States of the Gulf) Arabian Gulf

Pool B

Teams	Pld	W	D	L	PF	PA	+/−	Pts
Hong Kong	5	4	1	0	120	44	+76	14
Zimbabwe	5	4	1	0	110	32	+78	14
Belgium	5	3	0	2	66	78	−12	11
Czechoslovakia	5	1	1	3	55	88	−33	8
Sri Lanka	5	1	0	4	40	103	−63	7
Morocco	5	0	1	4	40	86	−46	6

Matches

29 May 1992

Zimbabwe	10−10	Hong Kong

29 May 1992

Belgium	10−0	Morocco

29 May 1992

Sri Lanka	10−17	Czechoslovakia

29 May 1992

Zimbabwe	38−0	Belgium

29 May 1992

Hong Kong	30−4	Sri Lanka

29 May 1992

Morocco	12−12	Czechoslovakia

29 May 1992

Belgium	28−6	Sri Lanka

29 May 1992

Zimbabwe	16−6	Morocco

29 May 1992

Hong Kong	20−8	Czechoslovakia

29 May 1992

Morocco	6−16	Sri Lanka

29 May 1992

Hong Kong	28−6	Belgium

29 May 1992

Zimbabwe	24−12	Czechoslovakia

29 May 1992

Hong Kong	32−16	Morocco

29 May 1992

Zimbabwe	22−4	Sri Lanka

29 May 1992

Belgium	22−6	Czechoslovakia

Pool C

Teams	Pld	W	D	L	PF	PA	+/−	Pts
Taiwan	5	4	1	0	112	34	+78	14
Spain	5	4	0	1	78	46	+32	13
Tunisia	5	3	1	1	80	36	+44	12
Germany	5	2	0	3	56	60	−4	9
Malaysia	5	0	1	4	38	100	−62	6
Kenya	5	0	1	4	24	112	−88	6

Matches

29 May 1992

Spain	10−8	Tunisia

29 May 1992

Taiwan	12−6	Germany

29 May 1992

Malaysia	12−12	Kenya

29 May 1992

Spain	12−22	Taiwan

29 May 1992

Tunisia	22−0	Malaysia

29 May 1992

Germany	22−6	Kenya

29 May 1992

Taiwan	32−4	Malaysia

29 May 1992

Spain	14−0	Germany

29 May 1992

Tunisia	22−0	Kenya

29 May 1992

Germany	14−12	Malaysia

29 May 1992

Tunisia	12−12	Taiwan

29 May 1992

Spain	22−6	Kenya

29 May 1992

Tunisia	16−14	Germany

29 May 1992

Spain	20−10	Malaysia

29 May 1992

Taiwan	34−0	Kenya

=== Group stage 2 ===
Pool D

Teams	Pld	W	D	L	PF	PA	+/−	Pts
Namibia	2	2	0	0	52	14	+38	6
Hong Kong	2	1	0	1	22	40	−18	4
Taiwan	2	0	0	2	22	42	−20	2

30 May 1992

Namibia	24−10	Taiwan

30 May 1992

Namibia	28−4	Hong Kong

30 May 1992

Hong Kong	18−12	Taiwan

Pool E

Teams	Pld	W	D	L	PF	PA	+/−	Pts
Zimbabwe	2	2	0	0	38	20	+18	6
Spain	2	1	0	1	40	18	+22	4
Sweden	2	0	0	2	4	44	−40	2

30 May 1992

Sweden	0−24	Spain

30 May 1992

Sweden	4−20	Zimbabwe

30 May 1992

Zimbabwe	18−16	Spain

Pool F

Teams	Pld	W	D	L	PF	PA	+/−	Pts
Tunisia	2	2	0	0	36	20	+16	6
Portugal	2	1	0	1	28	24	+4	4
Belgium	2	0	0	2	16	36	−20	2

30 May 1992

Portugal	10−18	Tunisia

30 May 1992

Portugal	18−6	Belgium

30 May 1992

Belgium	10−18	Tunisia

Pool G

Teams	Pld	W	D	L	PF	PA	+/−	Pts
Germany	2	2	0	0	42	16	+26	6
Czechoslovakia	2	0	1	1	28	42	−14	3
Poland	2	0	1	1	12	24	−12	3

30 May 1992

Poland	0−12	Germany

30 May 1992

Poland	12−12	Czechoslovakia

30 May 1992

Czechoslovakia	16−30	Germany

=== Group stage 3 ===
No team was eliminated from stage 2, just rearranged on new seedings that went into Pools H, I, L and M. These four pools of three teams each meant that each team had to play a further two matches and this process resulted in eight teams given a new seeding for the quarterfinals, with four teams eliminated, to play in the Etna Cup.

Legend
Advances to Knockout Round (semifinalists eligible for World Cup)
Eliminated to Etna Cup Playoffs

Pool H

Teams	Pld	W	D	L	PF	PA	+/−	Pts
Namibia	2	2	0	0	46	4	+42	6
Portugal	2	1	0	1	16	30	−14	4
Poland	2	0	0	2	6	34	−28	2

30 May 1992

Namibia	22−0	Poland

30 May 1992

Portugal	12−6	Poland

30 May 1992

Namibia	24−4	Portugal

Pool I

Teams	Pld	W	D	L	PF	PA	+/−	Pts
Taiwan	2	2	0	0	49	16	+33	6
Czechoslovakia	2	0	1	1	20	40	−20	3
Tunisia	2	0	1	1	16	29	−13	3

30 May 1992

Taiwan	30−10	Czechoslovakia

30 May 1992

Tunisia	10−10	Czechoslovakia

30 May 1992

Taiwan	19−6	Tunisia

Pool L

Teams	Pld	W	D	L	PF	PA	+/−	Pts
Hong Kong	2	2	0	0	56	0	+56	6
Sweden	2	1	0	1	14	42	−28	4
Germany	2	0	0	2	14	38	−28	2

30 May 1992

Hong Kong	24−0	Germany

30 May 1992

Sweden	14−10	Germany

30 May 1992

Hong Kong	32−0	Sweden

Pool M

Teams	Pld	W	D	L	PF	PA	+/−	Pts
Spain	2	2	0	0	40	12	+28	6
Zimbabwe	2	1	0	1	30	20	+10	4
Belgium	2	0	0	2	4	42	−38	2

30 May 1992

Zimbabwe	18−4	Belgium

30 May 1992

Spain	22−0	Belgium

30 May 1992

Zimbabwe	12−18	Spain

=== Knockout round ===
(31 May 1992)

Quarter-finals
31 May 1992 - Catania, Sicily
Namibia	16
Zimbabwe	10
31 May 1992 - Catania, Sicily
Taiwan	20
Sweden	12
31 May 1992 - Catania, Sicily
Hong Kong	26
Czechoslovakia	06
31 May 1992 - Catania, Sicily
Spain	10
Portugal	06

Semi-finals
31 May 1992 - Catania, Sicily
Namibia	24
Taiwan	06
31 May 1992 - Catania, Sicily
Hong Kong	14
Spain	12

Final
31 May 1992 - Catania, Sicily
Namibia	26
Hong Kong	10

=== Etna Cup ===
Hosts: Sicily	Stage 1 Eliminated Teams: (Cooperation Council for the Arab States of the Gulf) Arabian Gulf; Morocco; Sri Lanka; Malaysia; Kenya	Stage 2 Eliminated Teams: Poland; Tunisia; Germany; Belgium

Round 1 Etna Cup (30 May 1992)

Pool A: Morocco; Malaysia; (Cooperation Council for the Arab States of the Gulf) Arabian Gulf; Results: (Cooperation Council for the Arab States of the Gulf) Arabian Gulf 12 - 20 Malaysia; Morocco 24 - 12 Malaysia; (Cooperation Council for the Arab States of the Gulf) Arabian Gulf 18 - 06 Morocco; Classification: Morocco 4 points; Malaysia 4 points; (Cooperation Council for the Arab States of the Gulf) Arabian Gulf 4 points	Pool B: Sicily; Kenya; Sri Lanka; Results: Sicily 12 - 12 Kenya; Sri Lanka 00 - 24 Kenya; Sicily 34 - 00 Sri Lanka; Classification: Sicily 5 points; Kenya 5 points; Sri Lanka 2 points

Round 2 Etna Cup (31 May 1992)

Quarter-finals

Kenya won Poland lost

Tunisia won Morocco lost

Sicily won Germany lost

Malaysia 10 - 10 Belgium (extra time 14–10)

Semi-finals

Sicily won Malaysia lost

Tunisia won Kenya lost

Final

Sicily won Tunisia lost

The Sicilian team were completely fresh and faced opponents who in some cases had played nine draining games. Sicily entered Sunday having played a total of two games. The final was contested by Sicily and Tunisia. Although Tunisia led by 2 points when normal time expired, the Italian referee allowed play to continue until, in the fourteenth minute of the second half, the Sicilians scored.

== Former USSR representative ==
Although the Soviet Union had originally been an invited team, it had subsequently collapsed and the former constituent nations, demanded their own qualifying event. This was held in Moscow where the Latvia team, in their first ever sporting event, overcame Ukraine and Kazakhstan to reach the final where they beat Russia to claim the last place in Edinburgh.

Semi-finals
Latvia	20
Georgia	5
Russia	15
Lithuania	0

Final
Latvia	12
Russia	10
Third place
Georgia	19
Lithuania	0
