= 2000–01 World Sevens Series =

2000–01 IRB Sevens
- Series II
- Hosts: South Africa; United Arab Emirates; New Zealand; Hong Kong; China; Malaysia; Japan; England; Wales
- Date: 18 November 2000 – 3 June 2001

Final positions
- Champions: New Zealand
- Runners-up: Australia
- Third: Fiji

The 2000–01 World Sevens Series was the second edition of the global circuit for men's national rugby sevens teams, organised by the International Rugby Board. The season ran from November 2000 to June 2001 and consisted of nine tournaments (originally 10 were scheduled, but one was cancelled).

The series was won by New Zealand, who won six of the nine tournaments. Australia won the other three tournaments, and finished second on the series standings.

== Itinerary ==
2000–01 Itinerary
Leg	Venue	Dates	Winner
Durban	ABSA Stadium, Durban	18–19 November 2000	New Zealand
Dubai	Dubai Exiles Rugby Ground, Dubai	23–24 November 2000	New Zealand
Wellington	Westpac Stadium, Wellington	9–10 February 2001	Australia
Brisbane	Ballymore Stadium, Brisbane	16–17 February 2001	Cancelled
Hong Kong	Hong Kong Stadium, Hong Kong	30 March–1 April 2001	New Zealand
Shanghai	Yuanshen Stadium, Shanghai	7–8 April 2001	Australia
Kuala Lumpur	Petaling Jaya Stadium, Kuala Lumpur	21–22 April 2001	Australia
Tokyo	Chichibunomiya Stadium, Tokyo	29–30 April 2001	New Zealand
London	Twickenham Stadium, London	26–28 May 2001	New Zealand
Cardiff	Cardiff Arms Park, Cardiff	2–3 June 2001	New Zealand

== Final standings ==
The points awarded to teams at each event, as well as the overall season totals, are shown in the table below. Gold indicates the event champions. Silver indicates the event runner-ups. Points for the event runner-ups are indicated in silver. A zero (0) is recorded in the event column where a team played in a tournament but did not gain any points. A dash (–) is recorded in the event column if a team did not compete at a tournament.

Pos.	Event Team	Durban	Dubai	Wellington	Hong Kong	Shanghai	Kuala Lumpur	Tokyo	London	Cardiff	Points total
1	New Zealand	20	20	4	30	12	16	20	20	20	162
2	Australia	12	12	20	18	20	20	16	16	16	150
3	Fiji	16	16	16	24	8	12	12	12	8	124
4	Samoa	6	12	8	18	4	8	12	12	12	92
5	South Africa	8	8	2	8	16	12	8	8	12	82
6	Argentina	12	6	6	8	4	4	2	4	4	50
7	England	0	4	0	8	6	0	6	6	2	32
8	Canada	4	0	4	8	2	0	4	4	0	26
9	Wales	0	0	0	3	0	4	4	2	6	19
10	United States	–	–	12	4	–	–	0	–	–	16
11	South Korea	–	–	–	0	12	2	0	–	–	14
12	France	4	–	–	2	–	6	0	0	0	12
13	Cook Islands	–	–	12	–	–	–	–	–	–	12
14	Zimbabwe	0	4	–	–	–	–	–	–	–	4
15	Portugal	2	–	–	2	–	–	–	0	0	4
16	Georgia	0	0	–	–	–	–	–	0	4	4
17	Ireland	–	2	–	–	–	–	–	–	–	2
18	Hong Kong	–	0	–	1	0	–	0	–	–	1
19	Japan	–	–	0	0	0	0	0	–	–	0
20	Chinese Taipei	–	–	–	0	0	0	0	–	–	0
20	Malaysia	–	–	–	0	0	0	0	–	–	0
22	China	–	–	0	0	0	–	–	–	–	0
22	Russia	–	–	–	0	–	–	–	0	0	0
24	(Cooperation Council for the Arab States of the Gulf) Arabian Gulf	–	0	–	0	–	–	–	–	–	0
24	Kenya	0	0	–	–	–	–	–	–	–	0
24	Morocco	0	0	–	–	–	–	–	–	–	0
24	Scotland	–	–	–	–	–	–	–	0	0	0
24	Singapore	–	–	–	0	–	0	–	–	–	0
24	Sri Lanka	–	–	–	0	0	–	–	–	–	0
24	Thailand	–	–	–	0	–	0	–	–	–	0
31	Namibia	0	–	–	–	–	–	–	–	–	0
31	Niue	–	–	0	–	–	–	–	–	–	0
31	Papua New Guinea	–	–	0	–	–	–	–	–	–	0
31	Spain	–	–	–	–	–	–	–	–	0	0
31	Tonga	–	–	0	–	–	–	–	–	–	0
31	West Indies	–	–	–	0	–	–	–	0	0	0

Source: world.rugby (archived)

Legend
Gold	Event Champions
Silver	Event Runner-ups

== Tournaments ==
=== Durban ===
Event	Winners	Score	Finalists	Semi Finalists
Cup	New Zealand	34-5	Fiji	Argentina; Australia
Plate	South Africa	22-12	Samoa	France; Canada
Bowl	Portugal	26-24	Wales	Georgia; Morocco

=== Dubai ===
Event	Winners	Score	Finalists	Semi Finalists
Cup	New Zealand	38-12	Fiji	Samoa; Australia
Plate	South Africa	14-12	Argentina	England; Zimbabwe
Bowl	Ireland	27-19	Morocco	Wales; Canada

=== Wellington ===
Event	Winners	Score	Finalists	Semi Finalists
Cup	Australia	19-17	Fiji	United States; Cook Islands
Plate	Samoa	40-7	Argentina	New Zealand; Canada
Bowl	South Africa	47-17	Wales	England; Tonga
Shield	Japan	27-19	Papua New Guinea	China; Niue

=== Hong Kong ===
Event	Winners	Score	Finalists	Semi Finalists	Quarter Finalists
Cup	New Zealand	29-5	Fiji	Australia; Samoa	South Africa; Argentina; England; Canada
Plate	United States	31-26	Wales	Portugal; France	South Korea; Japan; China; Russia
Bowl	Hong Kong	47-5	West Indies	(Cooperation Council for the Arab States of the Gulf) Arabian Gulf; Chinese Taipei	Singapore; Sri Lanka; Thailand; Malaysia

=== Shanghai ===
Event	Winners	Score	Finalists	Semi Finalists
Cup	Australia	19-12	South Africa	New Zealand; South Korea
Plate	Fiji	45-14	England	Samoa; Argentina
Bowl	Canada	32-19	Wales	China; Hong Kong

=== Kuala Lumpur ===
Event	Winners	Score	Finalists	Semi Finalists
Cup	Australia	19-17	New Zealand	Fiji; South Africa
Plate	Samoa	19-14	France	Wales; Argentina
Bowl	South Korea	24-12	England	Canada; Japan

=== Japan ===
Event	Winners	Score	Finalists	Semi Finalists
Cup	New Zealand	26-12	Australia	Samoa; Fiji
Plate	South Africa	38-15	England	Wales; Canada
Bowl	Argentina	31-19	United States	South Korea; Japan

=== London ===
Event	Winners	Score	Finalists	Semi Finalists
Cup	New Zealand	19-12	Australia	Fiji; Samoa
Plate	South Africa	31-7	England	Canada; Argentina
Bowl	Wales	31-19	Scotland	Russia; Georgia

=== Cardiff ===
Event	Winners	Score	Finalists	Semi Finalists
Cup	New Zealand	31-5	Australia	Samoa; South Africa
Plate	Fiji	47-14	Wales	Argentina; Georgia
Bowl	England	35-26	Portugal	Canada; Spain
