= Malaysia Sevens =

Rugby Union sevens tournament

- Sport: Rugby sevens
- First season: 2001
- No. of teams: 12
- Most recent champion: Hong Kong (2014)
- Most titles: Japan (4 times)

The Malaysia Sevens is an annual rugby union sevens tournament contested by national teams. The event was first hosted as a leg of the IRB World Sevens Series in 2001 and 2002.

The Malaysia sevens was then made as an official event in the Asian Sevens Series between 2009 and 2014, with the event first being held in Borneo before being moved back to Kuala Lumpur in 2013.

== Results ==
Year	Venue	Cup final			Placings			Refs
		Winner	Score	Runner-up	Plate	Bowl	Shield	
2001; Details	Petaling Jaya Stadium	Australia	19–17	New Zealand	Samoa	South Korea	n/a	
2002; Details	Petaling Jaya Stadium	New Zealand	25–9	South Africa	England	Scotland	Japan	
2009; Details	Likas Stadium	Japan	38–14	Hong Kong	China	Chinese Taipei	n/a	
2010; Details	Likas Stadium	Hong Kong	31–28	Japan	Malaysia	Kazakhstan	n/a	
2011; Details	Likas Stadium	Japan	46–0	Philippines	Chinese Taipei	Sri Lanka	n/a	
2012; Details	Likas Stadium	Japan	33–22	Hong Kong	Chinese Taipei	Sri Lanka	n/a	
2013; Details	Petaling Jaya Stadium	Japan	14–10	Hong Kong	Malaysia	Kazakhstan	n/a	
2014; Details	Petaling Jaya Stadium	Hong Kong	24–7	Japan	China	Kazakhstan	n/a	

Key:
Blue border on the left indicates tournaments included in the World Rugby Sevens Series.
