= China Sevens =

International rugby sevens tournament

- Shanghai Sevens former logo
- Sport: Rugby sevens
- First season: 2001
- No. of teams: 12
- Most recent champion: Hong Kong (2019)

The China Sevens, most recently hosted in Huizhou, is an international rugby sevens tournament contested by national teams. The inaugural event, held in Shanghai, was a leg of the IRB World Sevens Series in 2001. The tournament moved to Beijing for 2002.

From 2009 to 2012 the tournament returned to Shanghai as an official event within the Asian Sevens Series. The event was hosted at the Chaoyang Stadium in Beijing for 2014, then Qingdao in 2015 and Huizhou in 2019.

== Results ==
=== International men's teams ===
Year	Venue	Cup final			Placings			Ref
		Winner	Score	Runner-up	Plate	Bowl	Shield	
2001; Details	Yuanshen Stadium, Shanghai	Australia	19–12	South Africa	Fiji	Canada	n/a	
2002; Details	Chaoyang Stadium, Beijing	New Zealand	41–14	South Africa	England	France	Japan	
2003; Details	Chaoyang Stadium, Beijing	Cancelled						
	No international tournament from 2004 to 2008							
2009; Details	Yuanshen Stadium, Shanghai	South Korea	42–19	Japan	Hong Kong	n/a	n/a	
2010; Details	Yuanshen Stadium, Shanghai	South Korea	38–24	China	Hong Kong	Thailand	n/a	
2011; Details	Yuanshen Stadium, Shanghai	South Korea	22–17	Hong Kong	China	Chinese Taipei	n/a	
2012; Details	Yuanshen Stadium, Shanghai	Hong Kong	40–10	China	Sri Lanka	Malaysia	n/a	
2014; Details	Chaoyang Stadium, Beijing	Hong Kong	36–19	South Korea	Kazakhstan	China	n/a	
2015; Details	Tiantai Stadium, Qingdao	Japan	28–12	China	Hong Kong	(United Arab Emirates); United Arab Emirates	n/a	
	No international tournament from 2016 to 2018							
		Winner	Score	Runner-up	Third	Fourth	Fifth	
2019; Details	Olympic Stadium, Huizhou	Hong Kong	14–7	China	Japan	Sri Lanka	South Korea	
2020^{^{c}}	Olympic Stadium, Huizhou	Cancelled due to the COVID-19 pandemic						
2021^{^{d}}	Olympic Stadium, Huizhou	Cancelled due to the COVID-19 pandemic						

Key:
Light blue border on the left indicates a tournament included in the World Rugby Sevens Series.
Dark blue border on the left indicates a tournament included in the Asia Rugby Sevens Series.

== See also ==
- Asian Sevens Series
- China Women's Sevens

== Notes ==
^^{a} Huizhou was scheduled for 26-27 September as the third leg of the 2020 Asian Sevens Series, prior to August 2020 when Asia Rugby cancelled all their remaining competitions for the year due to the impact of the COVID-19 pandemic.

^^{b} Huizhou was scheduled for 25-26 September as the third leg of the 2021 Asian Sevens Series, but was subsequently replaced in the calendar by Dubai.
