= Cardiff Sevens =

Rugby union sevens tournament in Wales

- Sport: Rugby sevens
- First season: 2001
- No. of teams: 16
- Most recent champion: South Africa
- Most titles: New Zealand (2 titles)

The Cardiff Sevens was an annual international rugby union sevens tournament that was held at Cardiff Arms Park in Wales from 2001 to 2003 as part of the World Sevens Series. The event was effectively replaced in the series by the Bordeaux Sevens for the 2003–04 season.

== Results ==
Year	Venue	Cup final			Placings			Refs
		Winner	Score	Runner-up	Plate	Bowl	Shield	
2001; Details	Cardiff Arms Park	New Zealand	31–5	Australia	Fiji	England	n/a	
2002; Details	Cardiff Arms Park	New Zealand	23–12	England	South Africa	Argentina	Wales	
2003; Details	Cardiff Arms Park	South Africa	35–17	Argentina	New Zealand	Scotland	Georgia	
