= Oktoberfest Sevens =

Oktoberfest Rugby 7s
Tournament details
- Host: Germany
- Venue: Olympiastadion, Munich
- Teams: 8
- Website: www.oktoberfest7s.com

The Oktoberfest Rugby 7s was a rugby sevens tournament held in Munich, Germany, during the Oktoberfest event. In the first edition in 2017, Australia won the title in the final against Fiji, the Olympic champion from Rio. In 2019, South Africa won against Fiji, who made it again to the finals. The home team, Germany, finished 4th after losing to the All Blacks Sevens from New Zealand in the bronze medal match. In 2020 and 2021, the Oktoberfest Rugby 7s, had been cancelled due to the corona pandemic. The tournament will return to the Olympic Stadium in Munich 2022.

Over 30,000 spectators from Germany and around the world, mostly wearing fancy dress, attended the 2019 event.

Live acts, DJs and an entertainment program fill the breaks between the games over two days.

In 2017 and 2019, the German TV station “Sport 1” broadcast the tournament live. Apart from this, the Oktoberfest Rugby 7s broadcasts in over 60 countries worldwide.

== Format ==
In 2017 the teams at the inaugural event were drawn into three pools of four teams each. Each team played all the others in their pool once. The top two teams from each pool advance to the Cup brackets while the top 2 third place teams also compete in the Cup/Plate. The other teams from each group play-off for the Challenge Trophy.

In 2019 only 8 teams took part at the tournament and were drawn into 2 pools of four teams each.

== Teams 2017 ==
- Argentina
- Australia
- Chile
- England
- Fiji
- France
- Germany
- Ireland
- Portugal
- South Africa
- Spain
- Uganda

== Teams 2019 ==
- Germany
- Australia
- New Zealand
- England
- Fiji
- France
- South Africa
- United States

== Results ==
Year	Final			Third place		
	Winner	Result	2nd Place	3rd Place	Result	4th Place
2017	Australia	40:7	Fiji	South Africa	42:7	England
2019	South Africa	12:10	Fiji	New Zealand	22:12	Germany
