= Czechoslovakia national rugby sevens team =

The Czechoslovakia national rugby union team (sevens) represented Czechoslovakia at sevens rugby.

== History ==
Czechoslovakia participated in the qualifying tournament for the 1993 Rugby World Cup Sevens at Catania, Sicily in what was probably their last outing before the breakup of the country. They only won one of their five matches but made it to the quarterfinals, beating Tunisia.
