= Australia national rugby sevens team =

Rugby team

Australia
- Nickname: Aussie Men's Sevens
- Union: Rugby Australia
- Head coach: Liam Barry
- Captain: Nick Malouf
- Top scorer: James Stannard (1,239)
- Top try scorer: Lewis Holland (111)
First colours	Second colours

Rugby World Cup Sevens
- Appearances: 8 (first in 1993)
- Best result: Runners-up (1993, 2001)
Medal record
Men's rugby sevens
Commonwealth Games
Silver medal – second place	Delhi 2010	Team

The Australia national rugby sevens team represent Australia in men's rugby sevens. The team participates in the annual World Rugby Sevens Series competition and the quadrennial Rugby World Cup Sevens. Australia, being a member of the Commonwealth, also compete in the quadrennial rugby sevens event at the Commonwealth Games, as well as the Summer Olympics. Australia's best performance at the Commonwealth Games was silver at Delhi 2010, while at the Summer Olympics it is fourth at Paris 2024.

== Team name ==
The Australia national sevens side does not have a nickname as of 2016. The team is sometimes erroneously referred to as the Aussie Thunderbolts in sections of the media, but that name refers to Australia's developmental sevens side (the second team) rather than the official national team.

At the inaugural Hong Kong Sevens tournament in 1976, Australia was represented by a selected team under the name Wallaroos, originally the name of one of the foundation clubs of the Southern Rugby Union in 1874, but now used for the Australian women's team in 15-a-side rugby. Australia has also been represented at international sevens tournaments by the Australian Barbarians club.

== Tournament record ==
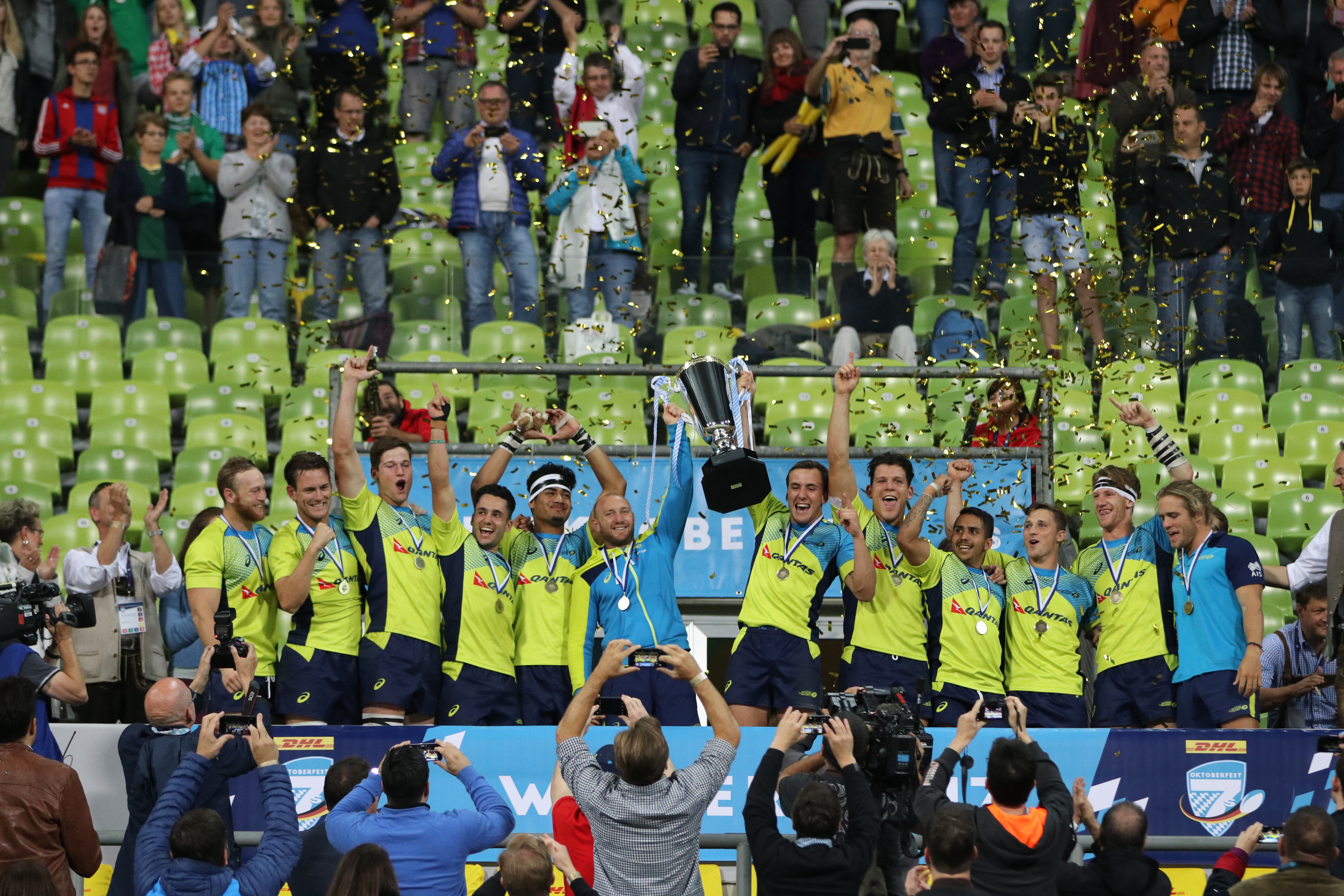
Australia lifting the Oktoberfest 7s trophy in 2017.

A red box around the year indicates a tournament played in Australia. An asterisk (*) indicates a shared placing.

=== Rugby World Cup Sevens ===
Rugby World Cup 7s
Year	Round	Position	P	W	L	D
(Scotland) 1993	Final	2nd place, silver medalist(s)	10	7	3	0
(Hong Kong) 1997	Quarterfinals	5 *	5	3	1	1
(Argentina) 2001	Final	2nd place, silver medalist(s)	8	7	1	0
(Hong Kong) 2005	Semifinals	(bronze) *	7	5	2	0
(United Arab Emirates) 2009	Plate final	10	6	3	3	0
(Russia) 2013	Quarterfinals	5 *	4	2	1	1
(United States) 2018	Challenge final	10	4	2	2	0
(South Africa) 2022	Bronze Final	4	4	2	2	0
2026	to be determined					
Total	0 Titles	8/8	48	31	15	2

=== World Games ===
World Games Rugby 7s ^{^{a}}
Year	Round	Position	P	W	L	D
(Japan) 2001	Final	2nd place, silver medalist(s)	6	5	1	0
(Germany) 2005	did not participate					
(Chinese Taipei) 2009	did not participate					
(Colombia) 2013	did not participate					
Total	0 Titles	1/4	6	5	1	0

=== Olympic Games ===
Olympic Games Rugby 7s
Year	Round	Position	P	W	L	D
(Brazil) 2016	Quarter-finals	8	6	2	4	0
(Japan) 2020	Quarter-finals	7	6	2	4	0
(France) 2024	Bronze match	4	6	4	2	0
(United States) 2028	to be determined					
(Australia) 2032	Qualified as host					
Total	0 Titles	3/3	18	8	10	0

=== Commonwealth Games ===
Commonwealth Games 7s
Year	Round	Position	P	W	L	D
(Malaysia) 1998	Third playoff	3rd place, bronze medalist(s)	5	4	1	0
(England) 2002	Quarterfinals	5 *	4	3	1	0
(Australia) 2006	Third playoff	4	6	3	3	0
(India) 2010	Final	2nd place, silver medalist(s)	6	4	2	0
(Scotland) 2014	Third playoff	3rd place, bronze medalist(s)	6	5	1	0
(Australia) 2018	Fifth playoff	5	5	4	1	0
(England) 2022	Third playoff	4	6	3	3	0
Total	0 Titles	6/6	38	26	12	0

=== Oceania Sevens ===
Oceania Rugby 7s
Year	Round	Position	P	W	L	D
(Samoa) 2008	did not participate					
(French Polynesia) 2009	did not participate					
(Australia) 2010	Final	1st place, gold medalist(s)	6	6	0	0
(Samoa) 2011	Third playoff	4	7	4	3	0
(Australia) 2012	Final	1st place, gold medalist(s)	6	6	0	0
(Fiji) 2013	Third playoff	3rd place, bronze medalist(s)	6	4	2	0
(Australia) 2014	Third playoff	4	6	4	2	0
(New Zealand) 2015	Final	1st place, gold medalist(s)	6	6	0	0
(Fiji) 2016	Third playoff	3rd place, bronze medalist(s)	6	4	2	0
(Fiji) 2017	Semifinals	(bronze) *	4	3	1	0
(Fiji) 2018	Third playoff	4	5	3	2	0
(Fiji) 2019	Final	1st place, gold medalist(s)	6	6	0	0
(Australia) 2021	round-robin	3rd place, bronze medalist(s)	5	1	4	0
(New Zealand) 2022^{^{b}}	round-robin	2nd place, silver medalist(s)	6	4	2	0
(Australia) 2023^{^{b}}	Seventh playoff	7	5	3	2	0
(Solomon Islands) 2024^{^{b}}	Fifth playoff	5	6	4	2	0
2025^{^{b}}	to be determined					
Total	4 Titles	13/16	75	55	20	0

Notes:

a. Rugby Sevens was discontinued at the World Games after 2013 due to the sport returning to the Olympics in 2016.

b. Australia VII or development team entered

== World Rugby Sevens Series ==
Logo 2008–2017

Key to tournament locations
Africa and Middle East Asia	
Americas Europe	
Oceania	Australian event

=== 2000s ===
Summary for Series I to X

World Sevens Series
I 99–00	II 00–01	III 01–02	IV 02–03	V 03–04
5th Dubai	(bronze) rd* Dubai	no status** Dubai	(bronze) rd* Dubai	6th Dubai
5th Stellenbosch	(bronze) rd* Durban	5th Durban	(bronze) rd* George	7th* George
(bronze) rd* Wellington	(gold) st Wellington	7th* Wellington	(bronze) rd* Wellington	10th Wellington
(silver) nd Brisbane	cancelled^{‡} Brisbane	(gold) st Brisbane	5th Brisbane	–
(bronze) rd* Suva	–	–	–	–
5th Punta del Este	–	7th* Santiago	–	9th Los Angeles
(bronze) rd* Mar del Plata	–^{†}	5th Mar del Plata	–	–
(bronze) rd* Hong Kong	(bronze) rd* Hong Kong	5th* Hong Kong	5th* Hong Kong	5th* Hong Kong
(bronze) rd* Tokyo	(silver) nd Tokyo	(bronze) rd* Singapore	cancelled^{§} Singapore	7th* Singapore
–	(gold) st Shanghai	(bronze) rd* Beijing	cancelled^{§} Beijing	–
–	(gold) st Kuala Lumpur	(bronze) rd* Kuala Lumpur	–	–
–	(silver) nd London	5th London	5th London	7th* London
(bronze) rd* Paris	(silver) nd Cardiff	(bronze) rd* Cardiff	6th Cardiff	6th Bordeaux
10/10 118 pts rd	9/9 150 pts nd	11/11 108 pts 5th	7/7 66 pts 5th	8/8 34 pts 8th
Notes: * Shared placing (play-off matches for third were eventually introduced in 2012). ** Downgraded to non-series status in wake of September 11 attacks in 2001.^{†} Mar del Plata hosted the Sevens World Cup instead of a leg in the 2001 series.^{‡} Tournament cancelled by IRB in response to government sanctions against Fiji.^{§} Tournament cancelled due to concerns about the SARS outbreak in Asia in 2002.

IRB Sevens World Series
VI 04–05	VII 05–06	VIII 06–07	IX 07–08	X 08–09
7th* Dubai	7th* Dubai	7th* Dubai	9th Dubai	7th* Dubai
9th George	7th* George	9th George	11th* George	10th George
5th Wellington	7th* Wellington	11th* Wellington	(bronze) rd* Wellington	11th* Wellington
–	–	5th Adelaide	7th* Adelaide	6th Adelaide
–	–	–	–	–
(bronze) rd* Los Angeles	7th* Los Angeles	7th* San Diego	12th San Diego	9th San Diego
–	–	–	–	–
–^{†}	5th* Hong Kong	5th* Hong Kong	5th* Hong Kong	5th* Hong Kong
6th Singapore	7th* Singapore	–	–	–
–	–	–	–	–
–	–	–	–	–
6th London	11th* London	6th London	9th London	7th* London
7th* Paris	(bronze) rd* Paris	11th* Edinburgh	9th Edinburgh	6th Edinburgh
7/7 42 pts 7th	8/8 40 pts 8th	8/8 32 pts 7th	8/8 30 pts 8th	8/8 30 pts 8th
Notes: * Shared placing (play-off matches for third were eventually introduced in 2012).^{†} Hong Kong hosted the Sevens World Cup instead of a leg in the 2005 series.

=== 2010s ===
Summary for Series XI to XX

World Sevens Series
XI 09–10	XII 10–11	XIII 11–12	XIV 12–13	XV 13–14
5th Dubai	6th Dubai	5th Dubai	15th* Dubai	9th Dubai
7th* George	7th* George	7th* Port Elizabeth	9th Port Elizabeth	10th Port Elizabeth
5th Wellington	(bronze) rd* Wellington	10th Wellington	5th Wellington	5th Wellington
(bronze) rd* Adelaide	7th* Adelaide	4th Gold Coast	7th* Gold Coast	(silver) nd Gold Coast
(bronze) rd* Las Vegas	7th* Las Vegas	10th Las Vegas	13th Las Vegas	6th Las Vegas
–	–	–	cancelled^{†} Mar Del Plata	–
5th Hong Kong	6th Hong Kong	7th* Hong Kong	7th* Hong Kong	4th Hong Kong
–	–	(gold) st Tokyo	7th* Tokyo	5th Tokyo
(gold) st London	6th London	5th London	(silver) nd London	(silver) nd London
(silver) nd Edinburgh	(silver) nd Edinburgh	5th Glasgow	9th Glasgow	7th* Glasgow
8/8 122 pts rd	8/8 80 pts 5th	9/9 110 pts 6th	9/9 89 pts 8th	9/9 116 pts 5th
Notes: * Shared placing (play-off matches for third were introduced in 2012).^{†} Event cancelled due to demands on UAR joining The Rugby Championship.

World Rugby Sevens Series
XVI 14–15	XVII 15–16	XVIII 16–17	XIX 17–18	XX 18–19
(silver) nd Dubai	6th Dubai	5th Dubai	5th Dubai	4th Dubai
(bronze) rd Port Elizabeth	7th* Cape Town	11th* Cape Town	9th Cape Town	7th* Cape Town
6th Wellington	5th Wellington	10th Wellington	(bronze) rd Hamilton	7th* Hamilton
7th* Gold Coast	(silver) nd Sydney	4th Sydney	(gold) st Sydney	6th Sydney
5th Las Vegas	(silver) nd Las Vegas	6th Las Vegas	6th Las Vegas	7th* Las Vegas
–	(bronze) rd Vancouver	7th* Vancouver	6th Vancouver	9th Vancouver
5th Hong Kong	4th Hong Kong	(bronze) rd Hong Kong	11th* Hong Kong	11th* Hong Kong
9th Tokyo	7th* Singapore	4th Singapore	(silver) nd Singapore	7th* Singapore
(silver) nd London	10th London	6th London	7th* London	(silver) nd London
7th* Glasgow	6th Paris	10th Paris	11th* Paris	11th* Paris
9/9 120 pts 5th	10/10 134 pts 4th	10/10 113 pts 6th	10/10 123 pts 4th	10/10 104 pts 7th
Notes: * Shared placing (play-off matches for third were only introduced in 2012).				

=== 2020s ===
World Rugby Sevens Series
XXI 2019–20 (Note: Although originally scheduled for ten rounds, the 2019–20 series was cut short after six tournaments due to the COVID-19 pandemic.)	XXII 2021 (Note: Due to the COVID-19 pandemic, only two tournaments were played in the 2021 series and many top teams did not take part.)	XXIII 2021–22	XXIV 2022–23	XXV 2023–24
5th; Dubai; 12th; Cape Town	_{cancelled}^{‡}; Dubai; _{cancelled}^{‡}; Cape Town	5th; Dubai I; (silver) nd; Dubai II; cancelled^{‡}; Cape Town	7th*; Dubai; 10th; Cape Town	7th*; Dubai; (silver) nd; Cape Town
(bronze) rd; Hamilton; 4th; Sydney	_{cancelled}^{‡}; Hamilton; _{cancelled}^{‡}; Sydney	_{cancelled}^{‡}; Hamilton; _{cancelled}^{‡}; Sydney	5th; Hamilton; 7th*; Sydney	–; (silver) nd; Perth
(silver) nd; Vancouver; 4th; Los Angeles	–; Vancouver; –; Edmonton; cancelled^{‡}; Los Angeles	(bronze) rd; Vancouver; (bronze) rd; Los Angeles	(bronze) rd; Vancouver; 4th; Los Angeles	10th; Vancouver; 7th; Los Angeles
_{cancelled}^{‡}; Hong Kong; _{cancelled}^{‡}; Singapore	_{cancelled}^{‡}; Hong Kong; _{cancelled}^{‡}; Singapore	_{cancelled}^{‡}; Hong Kong; (bronze) rd; Singapore	Hong Kong I; 12th*; Hong Kong II; –; Singapore	4th; Hong Kong; 4th; Singapore
_{cancelled}^{‡}; Paris; _{cancelled}^{‡}; London	_{cancelled}^{‡}; Paris; _{cancelled}^{‡}; London	7th*; Toulouse; 4th; Málaga; (silver) nd; Seville; (gold) st; London	–; Toulouse; –; London	–; –
6/6; 81 pts; 4th	0/2; —	9/9; 126 pts; st	8/8; 99 pts; 6th	7/7; 83 pts; 4th
Notes: ^{‡} Event cancelled due to the COVID-19 pandemic				

== Players ==
=== Current squad ===
The following players have been selected to represent Australia during the 2023–24 SVNS tournament beginning in December 2023.

Note: Caps reflect the total number of SVNS events competed in as of the 2023 Dubai Sevens.

Player	Position	Date of birth (age)	Caps	Club/province
Tim Clements	Forward	8 April 1997 (age 29)	14	Sydney University
Nathan Lawson	Forward	23 January 1999 (age 27)	18	Southern Districts
Nick Malouf (c)	Forward	19 March 1993 (age 33)	54	University of Queensland
Josh Turner	Forward	23 September 1995 (age 31)	27	Manly
Dally Bird	Back	20 July 2002 (age 24)	10	Eastwood
Ben Dowling	Back	5 March 2000 (age 26)	7	Randwick
Matt Gonzalez	Back	1 June 1994 (age 32)	68	Eastwood
Maurice Longbottom	Back	30 January 1995 (age 31)	39	Randwick
Dietrich Roache	Back	6 July 2001 (age 25)	21	Western Sydney Two Blues
Hayden Sargeant	Back	11 March 1998 (age 28)	7	Bond University
James Turner	Back	29 August 1998 (age 28)	8	Norths Rugby

== Records and statistics ==
=== Player records ===
The following shows leading career Australia players based on statistics from the World Rugby Sevens Series. Players in bold are still active.

Tries scored
No.	Player	Tries
1	Henry Hutchison	115
2	Lewis Holland	114
3	**Maurice Longbottom**	113
4	Ed Jenkins	109
5	Peter Miller	107

Points scored
No.	Player	Points
1	**Maurice Longbottom**	792
2	**Dietrich Roache**	753
3	**Nick Malouf**	410
4	**Nathan Lawson**	345
5	**Josh Turner**	277

Matches played
No.	Player	Matches
1	**Nick Malouf**	304
2	**Maurice Longbottom**	221
3	**Josh Turner**	170
4	**Dietrich Roache**	159
5	**Nathan Lawson**	139

=== Award winners ===
The following Australia Sevens players have been recognised at the World Rugby Awards since 2004:

World Rugby Men's 7s Player of the Year
Year	Nominees	Winners
2018	Ben O'Donnell	—
2022	Nick Malouf	—
2022	Corey Toole	—

World Rugby Men's 7s Dream Team
Year	No.	Player
2024	5.	Nathan Lawson

=== Captains ===
Name	Year	Ref
Ed Jenkins	2011–2016	
Sam Myers	2016	
Lewis Holland	2018–2019	
James Stannard	2018	
Con Foley	2018	
Jesse Parahi	2018	

== Coaches ==
Name	Tenure	Ref
Bill Millard	2002–2005	
Glen Ella	2005–2007	
Bill Millard	2007–08 (interim)	
Michael O'Connor	2008–2014	
Geraint John	2014–15	
Tim Walsh	2015 (interim)	
Scott Bowen	2015–16 (interim)	
Andy Friend	2016–2018	
Jarred Hodges	2018 (interim)	
Tim Walsh	2018–2021	
John Manenti	2022–present	

== Honours ==
Australia has won the following:

World Rugby Sevens Series

- Champion: 2021–22
- Runner-up: 2000–01
- Third place: 1999–2000, 2004–05

World Cup Sevens

- Silver medal: 2009, 2022
- Bronze medal: 2005

Commonwealth Games Sevens

- Silver medal: 2010
- Bronze medal: 1998, 2014

Rugby sevens at the World Games

- Silver medal: 2001

Major tournament wins

- Hong Kong Sevens: 1979, 1982, 1983, 1985, 1988, 2022
- Australian Sevens: 1987, 2002, 2018
- London Sevens: 2010, 2022
- Paris Sevens: 1998
- Wellington Sevens: 2001
- Kuala Lumpur Sevens: 2001
- Shanghai Sevens: 2001
- Tokyo Sevens: 2012

Regional and other tournament wins

- Oceania Sevens: 2010, 2012, 2015, 2019
- Oktoberfest Sevens: 2017

== See also ==
- National Rugby Sevens Championships
- Australia national rugby union team
