= 2001 Brisbane Sevens =

- IRB Sevens II
- Host nation: Australia
- Date: 16–17 February 2001

Tournament details
- Matches played: 0

The 2001 Brisbane Sevens, officially the 2001 Brisbane International Sevens, was a cancelled international rugby sevens tournament, originally scheduled to be part of the second season of the World Sevens Series in 2000-01. The International Rugby Board (IRB) withdrew the World Series hosting rights in response to the Australian government's sporting sanctions against Fiji.

The Australian federal government had refused to provide visas to the Fijian 7s squad following the Fiji military coup which had taken place in May 2000.

The statement from the IRB in response said:

While it is appreciated that the decision to ban the Fijians has been taken by the Australian government and not the ARU (Australian Rugby Union), the IRB, after careful consideration, has decided that the Host Union Agreement cannot in this instance be honoured and that, as a consequence, it will not be possible for the Series to be held in Brisbane. The Board has recognised that if the ARU wishes to proceed with the Tournament without Fiji, then it may do so, but it will not be a World Series event, nor will it be accorded status as an IRB event.

The event had been planned to be held in Brisbane on the weekend of 16–17 February 2001, but was cancelled. It would have been the 2nd edition of the Australian Sevens tournament but that had to wait for the 2002 Brisbane Sevens in the 2001-02 season.

IRB Sevens II
Preceded by 2001 Wellington Sevens	2001 Brisbane Sevens Sevens	Succeeded by 2001 Hong Kong Sevens
Australian Sevens
Preceded by 2000 Brisbane Sevens	2000 Brisbane Sevens	Succeeded by 2002 Brisbane Sevens
