= West Indies rugby sevens team =

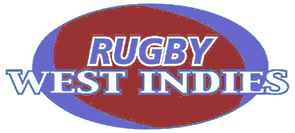
West Indies Rugby

The West Indies Rugby Union was established in 1975 and is the governing body of the twelve West Indies Unions (Bahamas, Barbados, Bermuda, British Virgin Islands, Cayman, Guadeloupe, Guyana, Jamaica, Martinique, St Lucia, St Vincent and Trinidad & Tobago).

The West Indies 7s team competes annually at the Carib 7s in Trinidad, the Deloitte 7s in the Cayman Islands and on the iRB Sevens World Series, competing at the 2001 Hong Kong 7s, Cardiff and Twickenham, Argentina and Chile in 2002, Los Angeles in 2005 and 2006 and in San Diego in 2007 and 2008.

== 2008 USA Sevens ==
Event	Winners	Score	Finalists	Semi Finalists
Cup	New Zealand	27 – 12	South Africa	Kenya; Samoa
Plate	Fiji	26 – 21	Argentina	England; Scotland
Bowl	Wales	21 – 19	United States	Canada; France
Shield	Australia	24 – 12	Chile	Mexico; West Indies

== Notable players ==
- Luther Burrell
- Derek Hurdle Jr.
- Claudius Butts
- Brendan O’Farrell
- Kurt Johnson (former Coventry and Orrell winger)
- Geoff Gregory
- Mark Hamilton
- Jonathan Cassidy
- Ronald Silverthorne
- Kevin MacKenzie
- Theo Henry
- Dan McGavern

== See also ==
- NAWIRA
