= 2000 Durban Sevens =

- IRB Sevens II
- Host nation: South Africa
- Date: 18–19 November 2000

Cup
- Champion: New Zealand
- Runner-up: Fiji

Plate
- Winner: South Africa
- Runner-up: Samoa

Bowl
- Winner: Portugal
- Runner-up: Wales

Tournament details
- Matches played: 41

The 2000 Durban Sevens, also known as the 2000 South Africa Sevens, was an international rugby sevens tournament that was the first leg of the 2000–01 World Sevens Series. The tournament, which took place at the ABSA Stadium on 18–19 November 2000, was moved from Stellenbosch to Durban for the 2000–01 and 2001–02 seasons.

The hosts, South Africa, were defeated 19–12 by Australia in the Cup quarterfinals but ended the tournament by beating Samoa 22–12 in the Plate final whilst defending World Sevens Series champions New Zealand defeated defending South Africa Sevens champions Fiji 34–5 in the Cup final.

== Format ==
The teams were drawn into four pools of four teams each. Each team played the other teams in their pool once, with 3 points awarded for a win, 2 points for a draw, and 1 point for a loss (no points awarded for a forfeit). The pool stage was played on the first day of the tournament. The top two teams from each pool advanced to the Cup/Plate brackets. The bottom two teams from each pool went on to the Bowl bracket. No Shield trophy was on offer in the 2000-01 season.

== Teams ==
Two teams made their IRB Sevens World Series debuts as Wales and Portugal competed for the first time. The 16 participating teams for the tournament:

- Argentina
- Australia
- Canada
- England
- Fiji
- France
- Georgia
- Kenya
- Morocco
- Namibia
- New Zealand
- Portugal
- Samoa
- South Africa
- Wales
- Zimbabwe

== Pool stage ==
Key to colours in group tables
| Teams that advanced to the Cup quarterfinals |
| Teams that advanced to the Bowl quarterfinals |

=== Pool A ===
| Pos | Team | Pld | W | D | L | PF | PA | PD | Pts |
|---|---|---|---|---|---|---|---|---|---|
| 1 | New Zealand | 3 | 3 | 0 | 0 | 106 | 7 | 99 | 9 |
| 2 | France | 3 | 2 | 0 | 1 | 53 | 27 | 26 | 7 |
| 3 | Portugal | 3 | 1 | 0 | 2 | 45 | 68 | -23 | 5 |
| 4 | Namibia | 3 | 0 | 0 | 3 | 17 | 119 | -102 | 3 |

Source: World Rugby

18 November 2000

| New Zealand | 36–7 | Portugal |

ABSA Stadium, Durban

18 November 2000

| France | 33–5 | Namibia |

ABSA Stadium, Durban

18 November 2000

| New Zealand | 53–0 | Namibia |

ABSA Stadium, Durban

18 November 2000

| France | 20–5 | Portugal |

ABSA Stadium, Durban

18 November 2000

| Portugal | 33–12 | Namibia |

ABSA Stadium, Durban

18 November 2000

| New Zealand | 17–0 | France |

ABSA Stadium, Durban

Source: World Rugby

=== Pool B ===
| Pos | Team | Pld | W | D | L | PF | PA | PD | Pts |
|---|---|---|---|---|---|---|---|---|---|
| 1 | Fiji | 3 | 3 | 0 | 0 | 59 | 20 | 39 | 9 |
| 2 | Canada | 3 | 2 | 0 | 1 | 41 | 29 | 12 | 7 |
| 3 | Wales | 3 | 1 | 0 | 2 | 34 | 32 | 2 | 5 |
| 4 | Kenya | 3 | 0 | 0 | 3 | 12 | 65 | -53 | 3 |

Source: World Rugby

18 November 2000

| Fiji | 17–10 | Wales |

ABSA Stadium, Durban

18 November 2000

| Canada | 21–7 | Kenya |

ABSA Stadium, Durban

18 November 2000

| Fiji | 20–0 | Kenya |

ABSA Stadium, Durban

18 November 2000

| Canada | 10–0 | Wales |

ABSA Stadium, Durban

18 November 2000

| Wales | 24–5 | Kenya |

ABSA Stadium, Durban

18 November 2000

| Fiji | 22–10 | Canada |

ABSA Stadium, Durban

Source: World Rugby

=== Pool C ===
| Pos | Team | Pld | W | D | L | PF | PA | PD | Pts |
|---|---|---|---|---|---|---|---|---|---|
| 1 | Australia | 3 | 3 | 0 | 0 | 88 | 22 | 66 | 9 |
| 2 | Argentina | 3 | 2 | 0 | 1 | 69 | 43 | 26 | 7 |
| 3 | Zimbabwe | 3 | 1 | 0 | 2 | 42 | 64 | -22 | 5 |
| 4 | England | 3 | 0 | 0 | 3 | 12 | 82 | -70 | 3 |

Source: World Rugby

18 November 2000

| Australia | 43–0 | England |

ABSA Stadium, Durban

18 November 2000

| Argentina | 33–17 | Zimbabwe |

ABSA Stadium, Durban

18 November 2000

| Australia | 26–10 | Zimbabwe |

ABSA Stadium, Durban

18 November 2000

| Argentina | 24–7 | England |

ABSA Stadium, Durban

18 November 2000

| England | 5–15 | Zimbabwe |

ABSA Stadium, Durban

18 November 2000

| Australia | 19–12 | Argentina |

ABSA Stadium, Durban

Source: World Rugby

=== Pool D ===
| Pos | Team | Pld | W | D | L | PF | PA | PD | Pts |
|---|---|---|---|---|---|---|---|---|---|
| 1 | Samoa | 3 | 3 | 0 | 0 | 74 | 10 | 64 | 9 |
| 2 | South Africa | 3 | 2 | 0 | 1 | 58 | 26 | 32 | 7 |
| 3 | Georgia | 3 | 1 | 0 | 2 | 7 | 51 | -44 | 5 |
| 4 | Morocco | 3 | 0 | 0 | 3 | 15 | 67 | -52 | 3 |

Source: World Rugby

18 November 2000

| South Africa | 22–0 | Georgia |

ABSA Stadium, Durban

18 November 2000

| Samoa | 24–10 | Morocco |

ABSA Stadium, Durban

18 November 2000

| South Africa | 36–5 | Morocco |

ABSA Stadium, Durban

18 November 2000

| Samoa | 29–0 | Georgia |

ABSA Stadium, Durban

18 November 2000

| Georgia | 7–0 | Morocco |

ABSA Stadium, Durban

18 November 2000

| South Africa | 0–21 | Samoa |

ABSA Stadium, Durban

Source: World Rugby

== Knockout stage ==
=== Bowl ===
Quarter-finals
19 November 2000 – ABSA Stadium
Portugal | 10
Kenya | 0
19 November 2000 – ABSA Stadium
Georgia | 10
England | 7
19 November 2000 – ABSA Stadium
Wales | 19
Namibia | 7
19 November 2000 – ABSA Stadium
Morocco | 22
Zimbabwe | 5

Semi-finals
19 November 2000 – ABSA Stadium
Portugal | 19
Georgia | 12
19 November 2000 – ABSA Stadium
Wales | 22
Morocco | 7

Final
19 November 2000 – ABSA Stadium
Portugal | 26
Wales | 24

Source: World Rugby

=== Plate ===
Semi-finals
19 November 2000 – ABSA Stadium
Canada | 7
Samoa | 35
19 November 2000 – ABSA Stadium
South Africa | 15
France | 0

Final
19 November 2000 – ABSA Stadium
Samoa | 12
South Africa | 22

Source: World Rugby

=== Cup ===
Quarter-finals
19 November 2000 – ABSA Stadium
New Zealand | 21
Canada | 12
19 November 2000 – ABSA Stadium
Argentina | 17
Samoa | 14
19 November 2000 – ABSA Stadium
Australia | 19
South Africa | 12
19 November 2000 – ABSA Stadium
Fiji | 12
France | 0

Semi-finals
19 November 2000 – ABSA Stadium
New Zealand | 40
Argentina | 0
19 November 2000 – ABSA Stadium
Australia | 5
Fiji | 10

Final
19 November 2000 – ABSA Stadium
New Zealand | 34
Fiji | 5

Source: World Rugby

== Tournament placings ==
| Place | Team | Points |
|---|---|---|
| 1st place, gold medalist(s) | New Zealand | 20 |
| 2nd place, silver medalist(s) | Fiji | 16 |
| 3rd place, bronze medalist(s) | Argentina | 12 |
| 3rd place, bronze medalist(s) | Australia | 12 |
| 5 | South Africa | 8 |
| 6 | Samoa | 6 |
| 7 | Canada | 4 |
| 7 | France | 4 |

| Place | Team | Points |
|---|---|---|
| 9 | Portugal | 2 |
| 10 | Wales | 0 |
| 11 | Georgia | 0 |
| 11 | Morocco | 0 |
| 13 | England | 0 |
| 13 | Kenya | 0 |
| 13 | Namibia | 0 |
| 13 | Zimbabwe | 0 |

Source: Rugby7.com

IRB Sevens II
| Preceded by First | 2000 Durban Sevens Sevens | Succeeded by 2000 Dubai Sevens |
South Africa Sevens
| Preceded by 1999 South Africa Sevens | 2000 Durban Sevens | Succeeded by 2001 Durban Sevens |
