= Arabian Gulf national rugby sevens team =

The Arabian Gulf national rugby sevens team was a minor national sevens side that represented the Gulf Cooperation Council member states. The team first played in 1990, competing at the Hong Kong Sevens tournament that year before travelling to the qualifying event for the Rugby World Cup Sevens held in Sicily. Over the next two decades the Arabian Gulf was a regular participant at the Hong Kong Sevens and in their home event, the Dubai Sevens. The Arabian Gulf team was dissolved at the end of 2010 to be replaced by single-country national teams.

== World Series and Rugby World Cup Sevens ==
Arabian Gulf recorded their first win during the World Sevens Series in the inaugural season, defeating Singapore by 45–7 at the 2000 Hong Kong Sevens. The following year, Robert Blignaut scored a try for the Arabian Gulf against eight-time champions New Zealand in their pool match loss at the 2001 Hong Kong Sevens before the team beat Sri Lanka 22–0 in the quarterfinals of the Bowl competition.

Arabian Gulf claimed their third match win on the world tour at the 2001 South Africa Sevens, defeating Georgia by 7–5. The team was also a regular competitor at the Sri Lanka Sevens tournament between 2000 and 2008, winning the Bowl trophy in 2003 and 2005.

In 2007, their opponents defeated them in each match. Mike Lunjevich was the team's head coach during the 2009 Rugby World Cup Sevens. The team was able to meet the criteria for inclusion in the tournament since it hosted the competition.

== Team disbanded ==
After hosting the World Cup in 2009, the Arabian Gulf sevens team played only one further season before being disbanded due to regulation modifications from the International Rugby Board. The Arabian Gulf Rugby Football Union, which was controlled by multiple countries, had overseen the Arabian Gulf rugby teams playing both sevens and fifteens versions of the game. After 2009, when rugby sevens was selected as a sport in the 2016 Summer Olympics, multiple-country unions were replaced by single-country ones.

The Arabian Gulf sevens team played their final tournament in front of a home crowd at the 2010 Dubai Sevens, losing 26–19 to France in the Shield semifinals. After the Arabian Gulf team folded, the United Arab Emirates national rugby sevens team was created in late 2010.

== See also ==
- Arabian Gulf rugby union team – the former unified 15-a-side representative team
- Rugby union in the Arabian Peninsula
