= Namibia national rugby sevens team =

Namibia
- Union: Namibia Rugby Union

World Cup Sevens
- Appearances: 2 (First in 1993)
- Best result: 21st (1993, 1997)

The Namibia national rugby sevens team has played in various rugby sevens tournaments, including the Commonwealth Games and the World Rugby Sevens Series. Namibia did not qualify for the Tokyo Olympics after finishing 5th at the 2019 Africa Men's Sevens.

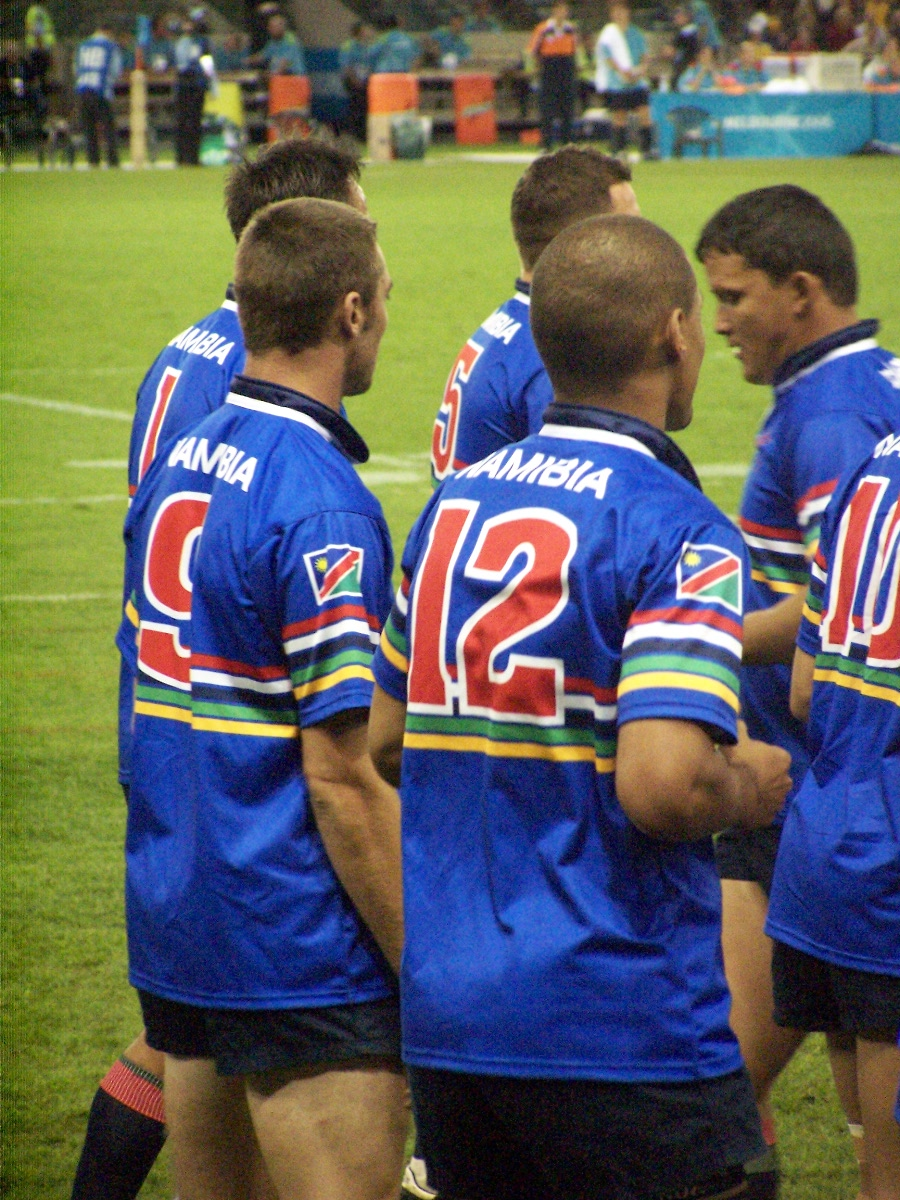
The national rugby sevens team of Namibia

== Players ==
12 men squad to the South African leg of the 2010–11 IRB Sevens World Series

1. Yoshiro Klazen
2. John Drotsky
3. Huscit Visagie
4. Howard Titus
5. Justin Nel
6. Attie du Plessis
7. Stein Gregory
8. Melrick Africa
9. Deon Mouton
10. Desmond Snyders
11. Loe Riekerts
12. Anthony Brandt
13. Simon Roberts

== Tournament History ==
=== Rugby World Cup Sevens ===
Rugby World Cup Sevens Record
Year	Round	Position	Pld	W	L	D
(Scotland) 1993	Group stage	21st	5	1	4	0
(Hong Kong) 1997	Bowl Quarter-finals	21st	5	0	4	1
(Argentina) 2001	Did not qualify					
(Hong Kong) 2005	Did not qualify					
(United Arab Emirates) 2009	Did not qualify					
(Russia) 2013	Did not qualify					
(United States) 2018	Did not enter					
Total	0 Titles	2/7	10	1	8	1

=== Commonwealth Games ===
Commonwealth Games record
Year	Round	Position	Pld	W	L	D
(Malaysia) 1998	Did not enter					
(England) 2002	Did not enter					
(Australia) 2006	Bowl Quarter-finals	13th	4	0	4	0
(India) 2010	Did not enter					
(Scotland) 2014	Did not enter					
(Australia) 2018	Did not enter					
Total	0 Titles	1/6	4	0	4	0

== See also ==
- Namibia national rugby union team (XV)
- Rugby union in Namibia
