= List of South Africa national rugby sevens players =

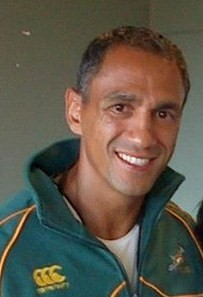
Paul Treu is one of the most-capped players for the Blitzbokke. He played in 32 tournaments between 1999 and 2002 and coached the team between 2004 and 2013.

Below is a listing of all South African rugby union players that have represented the Blitzbokke since 1993.

The "Years" column indicates the years during which each player was active. Tournaments that formed part of the Sevens World Series since its formalisation in 1999 are displayed for the date range of the relevant season.

List of South Africa national rugby sevens players
Number	Name	Debut	Tournaments	Years (Tournaments)
1	Chris Badenhorst	1993	3	1993 (HK, RWCS), 1996 (Uru)
2	Vlok Cilliers	1993	4	1993 (HK), 1994 (HK), 1996 (Dub, HK)
3	Jannie Claassens	1993	4	1993 (HK, RWCS), 1996 (Dub, HK)
4	André Joubert	1993	3	1993 (HK, RWCS), 1994 (HK)
5	Dieter Kriese	1993	3	1993 (HK, RWCS), 1995 (HK)
6	Ruben Kruger	1993	3	1993 (HK, RWCS), 1994 (HK)
7	Dion O'Cuinneagain	1993	5	1993 (HK, RWCS), 1995 (HK, Uru, HK)
8	Jacques Olivier	1993	17	1993 (HK, RWCS), 1997 (RWCS), 1999 (Arg, San), 1999–2000 (Dub, Uru, Arg), 2000–01 (SA, Dub, HK, Sha, KL, Jap, Lon, Car), 2001 (WG)
9	Joost van der Westhuizen	1993	4	1993 (HK, RWCS), 1994 (HK), 1997 (RWCS)
10	Dick Muir	1993	2	1993 (RWCS), 1995 (HK)
11	Chester Williams	1993	11	1993 (RWCS), 1994 (HK), 1998 (Arg, Uru, Viña, HK, CG), 1999–2000 (SA, Uru, Arg), 2001 (RWCS)
12	Chris Dirks	1994	1	1994 (HK)
13	Henry Honiball	1994	1	1994 (HK)
14	John Plumtree	1994	2	1994 (HK), 1995 (HK)
15	Adriaan Richter	1994	1	1994 (HK)
16	Hendrik Truter	1994	1	1994 (HK)
17	Jacques Jonker	1995	1	1995 (HK)
18	Tony Markow	1995	1	1995 (HK)
19	Shaun Payne	1995	4	1995 (HK), 1997 (RWCS), 1998 (Uru, Viña)
20	Riaan Potgieter	1995	1	1995 (HK)
21	Kevin Putt	1995	1	1995 (HK)
22	Luke Smith	1995	1	1995 (HK)
23	Janneman Brand	1996	2	1996 (Uru, HK)
24	Stephen Brink	1996	7	1996 (Uru, HK, Dub), 1997 (RWCS), 1998 (Arg, Uru, Viña)
25	Breyton Paulse	1996	6	1996 (Uru, HK), 1998 (Arg, Uru, Viña), 2001 (RWCS)
26	Abrie Pretorius	1996	1	1996 (Uru)
27	Riaan van Zyl	1996	2	1996 (Uru, HK)
28	André Venter	1996	4	1996 (Uru, HK), 1997 (RWCS), 1998 (CG)
29	Nigel Witbooi	1996	2	1996 (Uru, HK)
30	Chelton April	1996	1	1996 (HK)
31	Conrad Breytenbach	1996	1	1996 (HK)
32	Graeme Bouwer	1996	5	1996 (Dub), 1997 (RWCS), 1998 (HK), 1999 (Fiji, HK)
33	Peet Arnold	1996	4	1996 (Dub), 1998 (Arg, Uru, Viña)
34	Jorrie Kruger	1996	4	1996 (Dub), 1998 (Arg, Uru, Viña)
35	Pieter Rossouw	1996	3	1996 (Dub), 1997 (RWCS), 1998 (CG)
36	Bobby Skinstad	1996	4	1996 (Dub), 1997 (RWCS), 1998 (CG), (RWCS)
37	Jeffrey Stevens	1996	19	1996 (Dub), 1997 (RWCS), 1998 (CG), 1999 (Arg, San, Fiji, HK, Jap, Fra), 1999–2000 (Dub, SA, Uru, Arg, Wel, Fiji, Aus, HK, Jap, Fra)
38	Dirkie Strydom	1996	16	1996 (Dub), 1998 (HK), 1999 (Arg, San, Fiji, Jap), 1999–2000 (Dub, SA, Uru, Arg, Wel, Fiji, Aus, Fra), 2000–01 (SA, Dub)
39	André Snyman	1997	1	1997 (RWCS)
40	Selborne Boome	1998	3	1998 (Arg, Uru, Viña)
41	JP du Plooy	1998	3	1998 (Arg, Uru, Viña)
42	Hendrik Gerber	1998	3	1998 (Arg, Uru, Viña)
43	Joe Gillingham	1998	4	1998 (Arg, Uru, Viña, CG)
44	Chris Kruger	1998	2	1998 (Arg), 1999 (San)
45	Jan-Harm van Wyk	1998	10	1998 (Arg, Uru, Viña), 2001–02 (Dub, San, Arg, Aus, Wel, Bei, HK)
46	AJ Venter	1998	3	1998 (Arg, Uru, Viña)
47	Philip Smit	1998	2	1998 (Uru, Viña)
48	Deon Kayser	1998	2	1998 (HK, CG)
49	Neil Penrose	1998	1	1998 (HK)
50	Werner Raats	1998	2	1998 (HK, CG)
51	Rodger Smith	1998	14	1998 (HK), 1999 (Arg, San, Fiji, HK), 1999–2000 (Dub, SA, Uru, Arg, Fra), 2001 (RWCS), 2002–03 (Dub, SA, Aus)
52	Nico Venter	1998	1	1998 (HK)
53	Russell Winter	1998	2	1998 (HK, CG)
54	Gaffie du Toit	1998	2	1998 (CG), 2002 (CG)
55	Johan Calitz	1999	18	1999 (Arg, San, Fiji, HK, Jap, Fra), 1999–2000 (HK, Jap), 2000–01 (SA, Dub, Wel, HK, Sha, KL, Jap, Lon, Car), 2001 (WG)
56	Fielies Coetzee	1999	2	1999 (Arg, San)
57	Andries Fourie	1999	24	1999 (Arg, San, Fiji, HK, Fra), 1999–2000 (Dub, SA, Uru, Arg, Wel, Fiji, Aus, HK, Jap, Fra), 2000–01 (SA, Dub, Wel, HK, Sha, KL, Jap, Lon, Car)
58	Ricardo Loubscher	1999	4	1999 (Arg, San), 1999–2000 (Fra), 2001 (RWCS)
59	Hannes Venter	1999	6	1999 (Arg, San), 1999–2000 (Dub, SA, Uru, Arg)
60	Deon Oosthuysen	1999	1	1999 (San)
61	Daniel Grobler	1999	2	1999 (Fiji, HK)
62	Herman Mostert	1999	18	1999 (Fiji, HK, Fra), 1999–2000 (Wel, Fiji, Aus, HK, Jap, Fra), 2000–01 (SA, Dub, Wel, HK, Sha, KL, Jap, Lon, Car)
63	Wayne Munn	1999	2	1999 (Fiji, HK)
64	Paul Treu	1999	32	1999 (Fiji, HK), 1999–2000 (Dub, SA, Uru, Arg), 2000–01 (SA, Dub), 2001 (RWCS), 2000–01 (Wel, HK, Sha, KL, Jap, Lon, Car), 2001 (WG), 2001–02 (Dub, SA, San, Arg, Aus, Wel, Bei, HK, Sing, KL, Lon, Car), 2002 (CG), 2002–03 (Dub, SA)
65	Helgard Brink	1999	28	1999 (Fra), 1999–2000 (Dub, SA, Wel, Fiji, Aus, HK, Jap, Fra), 2000–01 (SA, Dub), 2001 (RWCS), 2000–01 (HK, Sha, KL, Jap, Lon, Car), 2001 (WG), 2001–02 (Dub, SA, San, Arg, Aus, Wel, Sing, KL, Aus)
66	Warren Britz	1999	14	1999 (Fra), 1999–2000 (Dub, SA, Uru, Arg, Wel, Fiji, Aus, HK, Jap, Fra), 2000–01 (SA, Dub), 2001 (RWCS)
67	Archer Dames	1999	1	1999 (Fra)
68	Eddie Fredericks	1999	11	1999 (Fra), 1999–2000 (Wel, Fiji, Aus), 2004–05 (Dub, SA, Wel, USA, Lon, Fra), 2005 (RWCS)
69	Ashwell Rafferty	1999	1	1999 (Fra)
70	Eben Verster	1999	1	1999 (Fra)
71	Bolla Conradie	1999	5	1999–2000 (Dub, SA, Wel, Fiji, Aus)
72	Conrad Jantjes	1999	16	1999–2000 (Dub, SA, Uru, Arg, Wel, Fiji, Aus, HK, Jap, Fra), 2000–01 (HK, Sha), 2002 (CG), 2002–03 (Dub, Car, Lon)
73	Mac Masina	1999	7	1999–2000 (Dub, Uru, Arg), 2000–01 (SA, Dub), 2001–02 (Aus, Wel)
74	Gcobani Bobo	1999	10	1999–2000 (SA), 2000–01 (Lon, Car), 2001 (WG), 2006–07 (Wel, USA, HK, Aus, Lon, Sco)
75	Gerrie Engelbrecht	2000	8	1999–2000 (Uru, Arg, Wel, Fiji, Aus, HK, Jap), 2000–01 (Wel)
76	Wonga Joka	2000	3	1999–2000 (Wel, Fiji, Aus)
77	Thobela Mdaka	2000	31	1999–2000 (Wel, Fiji, Aus, HK, Jap, Fra), 2000–01 (SA, Dub, Wel), 2001–02 (Dub), 2004–05 (Wel, USA, Sing, Lon, Fra), 2005 (RWCS, WG), 2005–06 (Dub, Wel, USA, HK, Sing, Fra, Lon), 2006 (CG), 2006–07 (Dub, SA, HK, Aus), 2007–08 (Wel, USA)
78	Juan Houtshamer	2000	2	1999–2000 (HK, Jap)
79	Wylie Human	2000	3	1999–2000 (HK, Jap, Fra)
80	Adi Jacobs	2000	2	1999–2000 (HK, Jap)
81	Patrick Petersen	2000	1	1999–2000 (Fra)
82	Fabian Juries	2000	50	2000–01 (SA, Dub, Wel, HK, Sha, KL, Jap, Lon, Car), 2001 (WG), 2001–02 (Dub, SA, San, Arg, Aus, Wel), 2002 (CG), 2002–03 (Car, Lon), 2003–04 (Dub, SA, Wel, USA, HK, Sing, Fra, Lon), 2004–05 (Wel, USA, Sing, Lon, Fra), 2005 (RWCS, WG), 2005–06 (SA, Wel, USA, HK, Sing), 2006 (CG), 2007–08 (Dub, SA, Wel, USA, HK, Aus, Lon, Sco), 2009–10 (Lon, Sco)
83	André Pretorius	2000	8	2000–01 (SA, Dub), 2001 (RWCS), 2000–01 (Wel, KL, Jap, Lon, Car)
84	Wayne van Heerden	2001	25	2001 (RWCS), 2000–01 (Wel, HK, Sha, KL, Jap, Lon, Car), 2001–02 (Dub, SA, Lon, Car), 2002 (CG), 2003–04 (Dub, SA, Wel, USA, HK, Sing, Fra, Lon), 2003–04 (Dub, SA, Wel, USA)
85	Nico Alberts	2001	1	2000–01 (Wel)
86	Ian Fihlani	2001	12	2000–01 (Wel), 2001–02 (Bei, HK, Sing, KL, Lon, Car), 2002–03 (Dub, SA, HK, Car, Lon)
87	Dale Heidtmann	2001	23	2000–01 (Wel), 2001–02 (Dub, SA, San, Arg, Aus, Wel, Bei, HK, Sing, KL, Lon, Car), 2002 (CG), 2003–04 (Dub, SA, Wel, USA, HK, Sing, Fra, Lon), 2004–05 (SA)
88	Jorrie Muller	2001	14	2000–01 (HK, Sha, KL, Jap), 2001–02 (Dub, SA, San, Arg, Aus, Wel, Lon, Car), 2002 (CG), 2003–04 (SA)
89	Marius Schoeman	2001	47	2000–01 (HK, Sha, KL, Jap, Lon, Car), 2001 (WG), 2001–02 (Bei, HK, Sing, KL, Lon, Car), 2002 (CG), 2002–03 (Dub, SA, Aus, Wel, HK, Car, Lon), 2003–04 (Dub, SA, Wel, USA, Lon), 2004–05 (Sing, Lon, Fra), 2005 (RWCS, WG), 2006–07 (SA, Wel, USA, HK, Aus, Lon, Sco), 2007–08 (SA, Wel, USA), 2008–09 (Dub, Sco), 2009 (WG), 2009–10 (SA, Wel, USA)
90	Joe van Niekerk	2001	6	2000–01 (HK, Sha, KL, Jap, Lon, Car)
91	Barry Jacobsz	2001	1	2001 (WG)
92	Daniel Philander	2001	1	2001 (WG)
93	Gerrie Britz	2001	4	2001–02 (Dub, SA, San, Arg)
94	Anton Pitout	2001	14	2001–02 (Dub, SA, San, Arg, Aus, Wel, Bei, HK, Sing, KL, Lon, Car), 2002 (CG), 2004–05 (Dub)
95	Egon Seconds	2001	10	2001–02 (Dub, SA, Bei, HK, Sing, KL, Lon, Car), 2002 (CG), 2005–06 (Dub)
96	Ashwin Willemse	2001	2	2001–02 (Dub, SA)
97	Neil Powell	2001	34	2001–02 (SA, San, Arg, Bei, HK, Lon, Car), 2002 (CG), 2002–03 (Dub, SA), 2007–08 (Dub, SA, Wel, USA, HK, Aus, Lon, Sco), 2008–09 (HK, Aus, Lon, Sco), 2009 (RWCS, WG), 2009–10 (Dub, Lon, Sco), 2010 (CG), 2010–11 (USA, HK, Aus, Lon, Sco), 2011–12 (Lon)
98	Brent Russell	2001	11	2001–02 (SA, San, Arg, Aus, Wel, Bei, HK, Sing, KL), 2002–03 (SA), 2003–04 (SA)
99	Jean de Villiers	2002	11	2001–02 (San, Arg, Aus, Wel, Bei, HK, Sing, KL, Lon, Car), 2002 (CG)
100	Antonius Verhoeven	2002	13	2001–02 (San, Arg, Aus, Wel), 2005–06 (Wel, USA, HK, Sing, Fra, Lon), 2006 (CG), 2006–07 (Wel, USA)
101	Eugene Francis	2002	17	2001–02 (Aus, Wel, Bei, HK, Sing, KL, Lon, Car), 2002–03 (Aus, Wel, HK, Car, Lon), 2003–04 (Dub, SA, Wel, USA)
102	Josh Fowles	2002	2	2001–02 (Sing, KL)
103	Luke Watson	2002	1	2002 (CG)
104	Darryl Coeries	2002	5	2002–03 (Dub, SA, Aus, Wel, HK)
105	Rudi Coetzee	2002	4	2002–03 (Dub, SA, Car, Lon)
106	Kevin Foote	2002	8	2002–03 (Dub, Aus, Wel, HK, Car, Lon), 2003–04 (Wel, USA)
107	Jaco Pretorius	2002	22	2002–03 (Dub, SA, Aus, Wel, HK, Car, Lon), 2004–05 (Dub, SA, Wel, USA, Sing, Lon, Fra), 2005 (RWCS), 2005–06 (Dub, SA, HK, Sing, Fra, Lon), 2006 (CG)
108	Leon van der Heever	2002	4	2002–03 (Dub, SA, Aus, Wel)
109	José van Rensburg	2002	22	2002–03 (Dub, SA, Aus, Wel, HK, Car, Lon), 2003–04 (Dub, SA, Wel, USA, HK, Sing, Fra, Lon), 2004–05 (Dub, SA, Wel, USA, Sing, Lon, Fra)
110	Marc de Marigny	2003	14	2002–03 (Aus, Wel, HK, Car, Lon), 2003–04 (Dub, SA, Wel, USA, HK, Sing, Fra, Lon), 2003–04 (Dub)
111	Hannru Haupt	2003	2	2002–03 (Aus, Wel)
112	Earl Rose	2003	8	2002–03 (Aus, Wel, Car, Lon), 2003–04 (Dub, SA, Wel, USA)
113	Grant Esterhuizen	2003	1	2002–03 (Wel)
114	Nicolas Eyre	2003	3	2002–03 (Wel), 2003–04 (Fra, Lon)
115	Alshaun Bock	2003	1	2002–03 (HK)
116	Malan du Plessis	2003	1	2002–03 (HK)
117	Alten Hulme	2003	1	2002–03 (HK)
118	Jaco van Schalkwyk	2003	8	2002–03 (HK, Car, Lon), 2003–04 (SA, HK, Sing), 2004–05 (Dub, SA)
119	Tonderai Chavhanga	2003	2	2003–04 (Dub, SA)
120	Danwel Demas	2003	23	2003–04 (Dub, SA, Wel, USA, HK, Sing, Fra, Lon), 2004–05 (Sing, Lon, Fra), 2005 (RWCS, WG), 2005–06 (Dub, SA, Fra), 2006 (CG), 2006–07 (Dub, SA), 2007–08 (Dub, SA, Lon, Sco)
121	Kabamba Floors	2003	11	2003–04 (Dub, SA, HK, Sing, Fra), 2005–06 (Dub), 2006–07 (Dub, SA), 2007–08 (SA, Lon, Sco)
122	Paul Delport	2003	33	2003–04 (Dub, Wel, USA), 2005–06 (Fra, Lon), 2008–09 (Dub, SA, Wel, USA, Sco), 2009 (RWCS, WG), 2009–10 (Dub, SA), 2010 (CG), 2010–11 (SA, Wel, HK, Aus, Lon, Sco), 2011–12 (Aus, Dub, SA, Wel, HK), 2012–13 (Aus, Dub, SA, Wel, USA, HK, Sco)
123	Bryan Habana	2004	4	2003–04 (Wel, USA), 2015–16 (USA, Can)
124	Bennie Adams	2004	6	2003–04 (HK, Sing, Fra, Lon), 2004–05 (Dub, SA)
125	Stefan Basson	2004	22	2003–04 (HK, Sing, Fra, Lon), 2004–05 (Sing, Lon, Fra), 2005 (RWCS, WG), 2005–06 (Dub, SA, Wel, USA, Fra, Lon), 2006 (CG), 2006–07 (Dub, SA, HK, Aus), 2007–08 (Lon, Sco)
126	Akona Ndungane	2004	4	2003–04 (HK, Sing, Fra, Lon)
127	Mzwandile Stick	2004	41	2003–04 (HK, Sing, Fra, Lon), 2004–05 (Dub, Wel, USA, Sing), 2005 (RWCS, WG), 2005–06 (Dub, SA, Wel, USA, HK, Sing), 2006 (CG), 2006–07 (Wel, USA, HK, Aus, Lon, Sco), 2007–08 (Dub, USA, HK, Aus), 2008–09 (Dub, SA, Wel, HK, Aus, Lon, Sco), 2009 (WG), 2009–10 (Dub, SA, Wel, USA, Lon, Sco)
128	Lesley Jackson	2004	6	2004–05 (Dub, SA), 2005 (RWCS), 2005–06 (SA, HK, Sing)
129	Gareth Krause	2004	5	2004–05 (Dub, SA, Wel, USA), 2005 (RWCS)
130	Joe Pietersen	2004	2	2004–05 (Dub, SA)
131	Oginga Siwundla	2004	2	2004–05 (Dub, SA)
132	Jongi Nokwe	2004	2	2004–05 (SA, Sing)
133	Shandré Frolick	2005	3	2004–05 (Wel, USA), 2006–07 (Dub)
134	Derick Kuün	2005	2	2004–05 (Wel, USA)
135	Schalk van der Merwe	2005	30	2004–05 (Wel, USA, Sing, Lon, Fra), 2005 (RWCS, WG), 2005–06 (Dub, SA, Wel, USA, Fra, Lon), 2006 (Rugby sevens at the 2006 Commonwealth Games), 2006–07 (Dub, SA, Wel, USA, HK, Aus, Lon, Sco), 2007–08 (Dub, SA, Wel, USA, HK, Aus, Lon, Sco)
136	Jano Vermaak	2005	3	2004–05 (Wel, USA), 2005 (RWCS)
137	Rayno Benjamin	2005	35	2004–05 (Sing, Lon, Fra), 2005 (WG), 2005–06 (Fra, Lon), 2006–07 (Dub, SA, HK, Aus), 2008–09 (Dub, SA, Wel, USA, HK, Aus, Lon, Sco), 2009 (RWCS, WG), 2009–10 (Dub, Wel, USA, Aus, HK, Lon, Sco), 2010 (CG), 2013 (RWCS), 2014–15 (Dub, SA, Wel, USA), 2015–16 (Dub, SA)
138	Ossie Damons	2005	2	2004–05 (Lon, Fra)
139	Jonathan Mokuena	2005	24	2004–05 (Lon, Fra), 2005 (WG), 2005–06 (Dub, SA, Wel, USA, HK, Sing, Fra, Lon), 2006 (CG), 2006–07 (Dub, SA, Wel, USA, HK, Aus), 2007–08 (Dub, Wel, USA, HK, Aus, Sco)
140	Renfred Dazel	2005	37	2005 (WG), 2005–06 (Dub, SA, Wel, USA, HK, Sing), 2006 (CG), 2006–07 (SA, Wel, USA), 2007–08 (Dub, SA, Wel, USA, HK, Aus), 2008–09 (Dub, SA, Wel, USA, HK, Aus, Lon, Sco), 2009 (RWCS, WG), 2009–10 (Lon, Sco), 2010 (CG), 2010–11 (Dub, Wel, USA), 2011–12 (Aus, Dub, USA, Jap)
141	Zolani Mofu	2005	6	2005 (WG), 2005–06 (Dub, SA, Wel, USA), 2006 (CG)
142	Jandré Blom	2005	6	2005–06 (Dub, SA, HK, Sing), 2006–07 (Wel, USA)
143	Izak Saayman	2005	1	2005–06 (SA)
144	Heinrich Brüssow	2006	2	2005–06 (HK, Sing)
145	Sarel Potgieter	2006	4	2005–06 (HK, Sing, Fra, Lon)
146	Gio Aplon	2006	15	2005–06 (Wel, USA, Fra, Lon), 2006–07 (Lon, Sco), 2007–08 (Lon, Sco), 2008–09 (Dub, SA, Wel, USA, Lon, Sco), 2009 (RWC)
147	Phillip Burger	2006	9	2005–06 (Wel, USA, Fra, Lon), 2006 (CG), 2006–07 (Dub, SA), 2011–12 (Sco, Lon)
148	Ryan Kankowski	2006	9	2005–06 (Wel, USA, HK, Sing), 2006 (CG), 2015–16 (HK, Sing, Fra, Lon)
149	Jovan Bowles	2006	4	2006–07 (Dub, SA, Lon, Sco)
150	Mpho Mbiyozo	2006	33	2006–07 (Dub, Wel, USA, HK, Aus, Lon, Sco), 2007–08 (Dub, SA, Wel, USA, HK, Aus, Lon, Sco), 2008–09 (Dub, SA, Wel, USA, HK, Aus, Lon, Sco), 2009 (RWCS, WG), 2009–10 (Dub, SA, Wel, USA, Aus, HK, Lon, Sco)
151	Dusty Noble	2006	6	2006–07 (Dub, SA, HK, Aus, Lon, Sco)
152	Baldwin McBean	2007	4	2006–07 (Wel, USA), 2007–08 (Dub, SA)
153	Howard Noble	2007	7	2006–07 (Wel, USA, HK, Aus), 2008–09 (Wel, USA, Aus)
154	Grant Rees	2007	2	2006–07 (Wel, USA)
155	Vuyo Zangqa	2007	21	2006–07 (HK, Aus, Lon, Sco), 2007–08 (Dub, SA, Wel, USA, HK, Aus, Lon, Sco), 2008–09 (Dub, SA, Wel, USA, HK, Aus, Lon, Sco), 2009 (RWCS)
156	Deon Fourie	2007	2	2006–07 (Lon, Sco)
157	MJ Mentz	2007	18	2006–07 (Lon, Sco), 2007–08 (Dub, SA, Wel, USA, HK, Aus, Lon, Sco), 2009–10 (Dub, SA, HK, Lon, Sco), 2010 (CG), 2010–11 (Dub, Aus)
158	Andries Strauss	2007	2	2006–07 (Lon, Sco)
159	Frankie Horne	2007	71	2007–08 (Dub, SA, Wel, USA, HK, Aus, Lon, Sco), 2008–09 (Dub, SA, Wel, USA, HK, Aus, Lon, Sco), 2009 (RWCS, WG), 2009–10 (Dub, SA, Wel, USA, Aus, HK, Lon, Sco), 2010–11 (Dub, SA, Wel, USA, HK, Aus, Lon, Sco), 2011–12 (Aus, Dub, SA, Wel, USA, HK, Jap, Sco, Lon), 2012–13 (Aus, Dub, SA, Wel, USA, HK, Jap, Sco, Lon), 2013–14 (Aus, Dub, SA, Wel, USA, HK, Jap, Sco, Lon), 2014 (CG), 2014–15 (Aus, Dub, SA, Wel, USA, HK, Jap, Sco, Lon)
160	Juan de Jongh	2008	6	2007–08 (Wel), 2015–16 (Dub, SA, Wel, Aus), 2016 (OG)
161	Robert Ebersohn	2008	12	2007–08 (HK, Aus), 2008–09 (Dub, SA, Wel, USA, HK, Aus, Lon), 2009 (RWCS), 2011–12 (Aus, Dub)
162	Wilton Pietersen	2008	2	2007–08 (HK, Aus)
163	Norman Nelson	2008	2	2007–08 (Lon, Sco)
164	Kyle Brown	2008	76	2008–09 (Dub, SA, Wel, USA, HK, Aus, Lon, Sco), 2009 (RWCS, Rugby sevens at the 2009 World Games), 2009–10 (Dub, SA, Wel, USA, Aus, HK), 2010–11 (Dub, SA, Wel, USA, HK, Aus, Lon, Sco), 2011–12 (Aus, Dub, SA, Wel, USA, HK, Jap, Sco, Lon), 2012–13 (Aus, SA), 2013 (RWCS, WG), 2013–14 (Aus, Dub, SA, Wel, USA, HK, Jap), 2014 (CG), 2014–15 (Dub, SA, Wel, USA, HK, Jap, Sco, Lon), 2015–16 (Dub, SA, USA, Can, HK, Sing, Fra, Lon), 2016 (OG), 2016–17 (Dub, SA), 2017–18 (Dub, SA, Aus, Ham, USA, Can, Sing), 2018 (CG), 2018–19 (Dub, SA, Ham, Aus)
165	Philip Snyman	2008	68	2008–09 (Dub, SA, Wel, USA, HK, Lon, Sco), 2009 (RWCS, WG), 2012–13 (Dub, SA, Wel, USA, HK, Jap, Sco, Lon), 2013 (RWCS), 2013–14 (Aus, Dub, SA, Wel, USA, HK, Jap, Sco, Lon), 2014–15 (Aus, Dub, SA, Wel, USA, HK), 2015–16 (Dub, SA, Wel, Aus, HK, Fra, Lon), 2016 (OG), 2016–17 (Dub, SA, Wel, Aus, USA, Can, HK, Sing, Fra, Lon), 2017–18 (Dub, SA, Aus, USA, Can, Lon, Fra), 2018 (CG, RWCS), 2018–19 (Dub, SA, Ham, Aus, USA, Can, Lon, Fra)
166	Milo Nqoro	2008	1	2008–09 (SA)
167	Lionel Mapoe	2009	4	2008–09 (USA, HK, Aus), 2009 (RWCS)
168	Chase Minnaar	2009	16	2008–09 (HK, Aus, Lon), 2009 (WG), 2009–10 (Dub, SA, Wel, USA, Aus, HK, Lon, Sco), 2010 (CG), 2011–12 (Aus, Dub, SA)
169	Cecil Afrika	2009	72	2009 (WG), 2009–10 (Dub, SA, Wel, USA, Aus, HK, Lon, Sco), 2010 (CG), 2010–11 (Dub, SA, USA, HK, Aus, Lon, Sco), 2011–12 (Aus, SA, Wel, USA, HK), 2012–13 (Aus, SA, Jap, Lon), 2013 (RWCS), 2013–14 (Aus, Dub, SA, Wel, USA, Jap), 2014 (CG), 2014–15 (Aus, Dub, SA, Wel, USA, HK, Jap, Sco), 2015–16 (Dub, USA, Can, HK, Sing, Fra, Lon), 2016 (OG), 2016–17 (Dub, SA, USA, Can, HK, Sing, Lon), 2017–18 (Dub, SA, Aus, Ham, USA, Can, Sing, Lon), 2018 (CG), 2018–19 (Fra), 2019–20 (Ham, Aus, USA, Can), 2022 (RWCS)
170	Deon Helberg	2009	2	2009–10 (Dub, SA)
171	JW Jonker	2009	4	2009–10 (Dub, SA, Aus, HK)
172	Shaun Venter	2009	1	2009–10 (SA)
173	Branco du Preez	2010	88	2009–10 (Wel, USA, Aus, HK), 2010–11 (Dub, SA, Wel, USA, HK, Aus, Lon, Sco), 2011–12 (Dub, SA, Wel, USA, HK, Jap, Sco, Lon), 2012–13 (Aus, USA, HK, Jap), 2013 (RWCS), 2013–14 (Dub, SA, Wel, USA, HK, Jap, Sco, Lon), 2014 (CG), 2014–15 (Aus, Dub, SA, Wel, USA, HK, Jap, Sco, Lon), 2015–16 (USA, Can, HK, Sing), 2016–17 (Dub, SA, Wel, Aus, USA, Can, HK, Sing, Fra), 2017–18 (Dub, SA, Ham, USA, Can, Lon), 2018 (CG), 2018–19 (Dub, SA, Ham, Aus, USA, Can, HK, Sing, Lon, Fra), 2019–20 (Ham, Aus, USA, Can), 2021 (OG), 2021–22 (Dub I, Dub II, Esp: Mál, Esp: Sev, Fra, Lon, USA), 2022–23 (HK 2022, Dub, SA)
174	Steven Hunt	2010	24	2009–10 (Wel, USA, Aus), 2010–11 (SA, Wel, USA, Lon, Sco), 2011–12 (Aus, SA, Wel, USA, Sco, Lon), 2012–13 (Aus, Dub, HK, Jap, Sco), 2013 (WG), 2013–14 (Aus, SA, HK), 2014–15 (Aus)
175	Hoffmann Maritz	2010	6	2009–10 (Wel, USA, Aus, HK, Lon, Sco)
176	Philip van der Walt	2010	2	2009–10 (Wel, USA)
177	Chris Dry	2010	74	2009–10 (Aus, HK, Lon, Sco), 2010–11 (Wel, USA, HK, Aus, Lon, Sco), 2011–12 (Aus, Dub, SA, Wel, USA, HK, Jap, Sco, Lon), 2012–13 (Aus, Dub, SA, Wel, USA, HK, Jap, Sco), 2013 (RWCS), 2013–14 (Aus, Dub, SA, Wel, USA, HK, Jap, Sco, Lon), 2014 (CG), 2014–15 (Aus, Wel, USA, HK, Jap, Sco, Lon), 2015–16 (Dub, SA, Wel, Aus, Can, Sing, Lon), 2016–17 (Dub, SA, Wel, Aus, USA, Can, HK, Sing, Fra, Lon), 2017–18 (Dub, SA, Ham, Aus, HK, Sing), 2019–20 (Dub, SA, Ham, Aus, Can), 2021 (OG)
178	Sampie Mastriet	2010	8	2009–10 (Aus, HK), 2013 (RWC), 2013–14 (Aus, Dub, SA, Wel, USA)
179	Bernado Botha	2010	16	2010 (CG), 2010–11 (Dub, SA, Wel, USA, HK), 2011–12 (Aus, Dub, SA, Wel, USA, HK, Jap), 2012–13 (SA, Lon), 2013 (WG)
180	Okkie Kruger	2010	1	2010 (CG)
181	Tera Mtembu	2010	4	2010 (CG), 2010–11 (Dub, Wel, USA)
182	Boom Prinsloo	2010	15	2010 (CG), 2010–11 (Dub, SA, Wel, HK, Aus, Lon, Sco), 2011–12 (Aus, Dub, SA, Wel, USA, HK, Jap)
183	S'bura Sithole	2010	8	2010 (CG), 2010–11 (Dub, SA, HK, Aus, Lon, Sco), 2013 (RWC)
184	Pieter Engelbrecht	2010	13	2010–11 (Dub, SA, Wel, USA, Aus), 2011–12 (HK, Jap, Sco, Lon), 2012–13 (Wel, USA, Sco, Lon)
185	Mark Richards	2010	14	2010–11 (Dub, SA, Lon, Sco), 2011–12 (Aus, Dub, SA, Wel, USA), 2013 (WG), 2013–14 (Aus, Sco, Lon), 2014 (CG)
186	Jacques Engelbrecht	2010	1	2010–11 (SA)
187	Paul Jordaan	2011	3	2010–11 (Wel, USA, HK)
188	Tshotsho Mbovane	2011	10	2010–11 (HK, Aus), 2012–13 (Aus, Dub, SA, Wel, USA, HK, Jap, Lon)
189	William Small-Smith	2011	5	2010–11 (Lon, Sco), 2011–12 (Dub, USA, Jap)
190	Cornal Hendricks	2011	19	2011–12 (SA, Wel, USA, HK, Jap, Sco, Lon), 2012–13 (Aus, Dub, SA, Wel, USA, HK, Jap, Sco, Lon), 2013 (RWC), 2013–14 (Aus), 2014 (CG)
191	Stephan Dippenaar	2012	34	2011–12 (Wel, USA, HK, Jap, Sco), 2012–13 (Aus, Dub, SA, Wel, USA, HK, Jap, Sco, Lon), 2013 (RWCS, WG), 2013–14 (Aus, Dub, Wel, USA, HK, Jap, Sco), 2014–15 (Aus, HK, Sco, Lon), 2015–16 (HK, Sing, Fra, Lon), 2016–17 (Aus, USA, Can)
192	Dirk Dippenaar	2012	1	2011–12 (Jap)
193	Clayton Blommetjies	2012	2	2011–12 (Sco, Lon)
194	Ryan Nell	2012	1	2011–12 (Sco)
195	Jamba Ulengo	2012	14	2011–12 (Sco, Lon), 2012–13 (HK, Jap, Sco, Lon), 2013 (WG), 2013–14 (Aus, Dub, USA, HK, Jap, Sco, Lon)
196	Cheslin Kolbe	2012	13	2011–12 (Lon), 2012–13 (SA, Wel, USA), 2013–14 (Dub, SA), 2014–15 (Dub, SA), 2015–16 (Dub, SA, Wel, Aus), 2016 (OG)
197	Ruwellyn Isbell	2012	4	2012–13 (Aus, Dub, SA), 2013 (WG)
198	Reuben Johannes	2012	2	2012–13 (Aus), 2013 (WG)
199	Kevin Luiters	2012	1	2012–13 (Dub)
200	Warren Whiteley	2012	5	2012–13 (Dub, SA, Wel, USA), 2014 (CG)
201	Justin Geduld	2013	66	2012–13 (Wel, HK, Jap, Sco), 2013–14 (Aus, Dub, SA, Wel, USA, HK, Jap, Sco, Lon), 2014 (CG), 2014–15 (Aus, Wel, HK, Jap, Lon), 2015–16 (Dub, SA, Wel, USA, Can, HK, Sing), 2016 (OG), 2016–17 (Dub, SA, Wel, Aus, USA), 2017–18 (Dub, SA, Aus, Ham, Lon, Fra), 2018 (CG, RWCS), 2018–19 (Dub, SA, Ham, Aus, USA, Can, HK, Sing, Lon, Fra), 2019–20 (Dub, SA, Ham, Aus), 2021 (OG), 2021–22 (Esp: Mál, Esp: Sev), 2022–23 (Fra, Lon), 2023 (AS), 2023–24 (Dub, SA, Can, USA, 2024 Hong Kong Sevens, Esp)
202	Seabelo Senatla	2013	45	2012–13 (Wel, USA, HK, Jap, Sco), 2013 (RWCS, WG), 2013–14 (Wel, HK, Jap, Sco, Lon), 2014 (CG), 2014–15 (Aus, Dub, SA, Wel, USA, HK, Jap, Sco, Lon), 2015–16 (Dub, SA, Wel, Aus, USA, Can, HK, Sing, Fra, Lon), 2016 (OG), 2016–17 (Dub, SA, Wel, Aus), 2017–18 (Dub, SA, Aus, Ham, Lon, Fra), 2019–20 (Dub, SA)
203	WJ Strydom	2013	4	2012–13 (Sco, Lon), 2013 (WG), 2013–14 (Lon)
204	Werner Kok	2013	56	2012–13 (Lon), 2013 (WG), 2013–14 (Dub, SA, Wel, USA, HK, Jap, Sco, Lon), 2014 (CG), 2014–15 (Aus, Dub, SA, Wel, USA, HK, Jap, Sco, Lon), 2015–16 (Dub), 2016 (OG), 2016–17 (Dub, SA, Wel, Aus, USA, Can, HK, Sing, Fra, Lon), 2017–18 (Dub, SA, Aus, Ham, USA, Sing, Lon, Fra), 2018 (CG, RWCS), 2018–19 (Dub, SA, Ham, Aus, USA, Can, HK, Sing, Lon, Fra), 2019–20 (Ham, Aus, USA, Can)
205	Kwagga Smith	2013	34	2013–14 (SA, USA, HK, Jap, Sco, Lon), 2014 (CG), 2014–15 (Aus, Dub, SA, Wel, USA, HK, Jap, Sco, Lon), 2015–16 (Dub, SA, Wel, Aus, USA, Can, HK, Sing, Fra), 2016 (OG), 2016–17 (Dub, SA, Wel, Aus), 2017–18 (Dub, SA, Aus, Ham)
206	Rosko Specman	2014	42	2013–14 (Wel), 2014–15 (USA, HK, Jap, Sco, Lon), 2015–16 (SA, Wel, Aus, USA, Can, Fra, Lon), 2016 (OG), 2016–17 (Dub, SA, Wel, Aus, USA, Can, Lon), 2017–18 (Dub, SA, Aus, Ham, Sing), 2018 (CG, RWCS), 2018–19 (Dub, SA), 2019–20 (Dub, SA), 2023 (AS), 2023–24 (Dub, SA, Can, USA, Sing, Esp), 2024 (FOQT, OG)
207	Shaun Adendorff	2014	2	2013–14 (Sco, Lon)
208	Ruhan Nel	2014	32	2014–15 (Aus, Dub, SA, Jap, Sco, Lon), 2015–16 (USA, Can, HK, Sing, Fra), 2016–17 (Dub, SA, Wel, Aus, USA, Can, HK, Sing, Lon), 2017–18 (Dub, SA, Aus, USA, Can, Lon, Fra), 2018 (CG, RWCS), 2019–20 (Dub, SA), 2021 (OG)
209	Warrick Gelant	2014	4	2014–15 (Dub, SA, Wel, USA)
210	Carel du Preez	2015	5	2014–15 (Jap, Sco, Lon), 2015–16 (Wel, Aus)
211	Francois Hougaard	2015	7	2015–16 (Dub, SA, Wel, Aus, Fra, Lon), 2016 (OG)
212	Dylan Sage	2015	30	2015–16 (SA, Wel, Aus, USA, Can, Fra, Lon), 2016 (OG), 2016–17 (Dub, SA, Wel), 2016–17 (Aus, USA, Can, HK, Sing, Fra, Lon), 2017–18 (Aus, Ham, USA, Can, Sing, Lon, Fra), 2018 (CG), 2019–20 (Dub, SA), 2023–24 (Sing, Esp)
213	Sandile Ngcobo	2016	5	2015–16 (Wel, Aus), 2016–17 (Sing, Lon), 2017–18 (HK)
214	Tim Agaba	2016	16	2015–16 (Aus, USA, Can, HK, Sing, Fra, Lon), 2016 (OG), 2016–17 (HK, Sing, Fra), 2017–18 (Dub, SA, Aus, Ham), 2018 (CG)
215	Siviwe Soyizwapi	2016	73	2015–16 (HK, Sing, Lon), 2016–17 (Wel, Aus, USA, Can, HK, Sing, Fra, Lon), 2017–18 (USA, Can, Sing, Lon, Fra), 2018 (CG, RWCS), 2018–19 (Dub, SA, Ham, Aus, USA, Can, HK, Sing, Lon, Fra), 2019–20 (Dub, SA), 2021 (OG), 2021 (Can: Van, Can: Edm), 2021–22 (Dub I, Dub II, Esp: Mál, Sing, Can, Fra, Lon, USA), 2022 (CG, RWCS), 2022–23 (HK 2022, Dub, SA, Ham, Aus, USA, Can, HK 2023, Sing, Fra, Lon), 2023–24 (Sing, Esp), 2024 (FOQT, OG), 2024–25 (Dub, SA, Aus, Can, HK, USA), 2025–26 (Sing, Aus, Can, USA, HK, Esp, Fra), 2026–27 (Dub)
216	Zain Davids	2017	67	2016–17 (Wel, Aus, USA, Can, HK, Sing), 2017–18 (Ham, Can, HK, Sing, Fra), 2018 (CG, RWCS), 2018–19 (Dub, SA, Ham, Aus, Can, HK), 2019–20 (Dub, SA, Ham, Aus), 2021 (OG), 2021 (Can: Van, Can: Edm), 2021–22 (Dub I, Dub II, Esp: Mál, Esp: Sev, Sing, Can, Fra, Lon, USA), 2022 (CG), 2022–23 (Dub, SA, Ham, Aus, USA, Can, HK 2023), 2023 (AS), 2023–24 (Dub, SA, Aus, Can, USA, HK, Sing), 2024 (FOQT, OG), 2024–25 (Dub, SA, Aus, HK, Sing, USA), 2025–26 (Dub, SA, Sing, Aus, HK, Esp, Fra), 2026–27 (Dub)
217	Stedman Gans	2017	21	2016–17 (USA, Can, HK, Sing), 2017–18 (Aus, Ham, USA, HK, Sing) 2018–19 (Ham, Aus, USA, Can, HK, Sing, Lon), 2019–20 (Ham, Aus, USA, Can), 2021 (OG)
218	Selvyn Davids	2017	57	2016–17 (HK), 2017–18 (USA, Can, HK, Sing), 2018 (RWCS), 2018–19 (Dub, SA, Ham, Aus, USA, Can, HK, Sing, Lon), 2019–20 (Dub, SA, Ham, Aus, USA, Can), 2021 (OG), 2021 (Can: Edm), 2021–22 (Dub I, Dub II, Esp: Mál, Esp: Sev, Sing, Can), 2022 (CG, RWCS), 2022–23 (HK 2022, Ham), 2023 (AS), 2023–24 (Dub, SA, Aus, Can, USA, HK, Sing, Esp), 2024 (FOQT, OG), 2024–25 (Aus, Can, HK, Sing, USA), 2025–26 (Dub, SA, Can, USA, HK, Esp, Fra), 2026–27 (Dub)
219	Ryan Oosthuizen	2017	71	2016–17 (HK, Fra, Lon), 2017–18 (USA, Can, HK, Sing, Lon, Fra), 2018 (CG, RWCS), 2018–19 (Dub, SA, USA, HK, Sing, Lon, Fra), 2019–20 (Dub, SA, USA, Can), 2021 (Can: Van, Can: Edm), 2021–22 (Dub I, Dub II, Esp: Mál, Esp: Sev, Sing, Can, Fra, Lon, USA), 2022 (RWCS), 2022–23 (HK 2022, Dub, SA, Ham, Aus, USA, Can, HK 2023, Sing, Fra, Lon), 2023 (AS), 2023–24 (Dub, SA, Aus, Can, USA, HK, Esp), 2024 (FOQT, OG), 2024–25 (Dub, Aus, Can, HK, Sing, USA), 2025–26 (Dub, SA, Sing, Aus, Can, USA, HK, Esp, Fra), 2026–27 (Dub)
220	Dewald Human	2017	38	2016–17 (Fra, Lon), 2017–18 (HK, Fra), 2018 (RWCS), 2018–19 (Dub, SA, Ham, Aus, Fra), 2021 (Can: Van, Can: Edm), 2021–22 (Dub II, Esp: Mál, Esp: Sev, Sing, Can, Fra, Lon, USA), 2022 (CG), 2022–23 (HK 2022, Dub, Fra, Lon), 2023–24 (Dub, SA, HK, Sing), 2024–25 (Dub, SA, Aus, HK, Sing), 2025–26 (Can, USA, Esp), 2026–27 (Dub)
221	Marco Labuschagné	2017	3	2016–17 (Lon), 2017–18 (Can, HK)
222	Sikhumbuzo Notshe	2018	2	2017–18 (Aus, Ham)
223	Muller du Plessis	2018	23	2017–18 (USA, Can, Sing), 2018–19 (Dub, SA, USA, Can, Lon, Fra), 2019–20 (Ham, Aus, USA, Can), 2021 (Can: Van, Can: Edm), 2021–22 (Dub I, Fra, Lon, USA), 2022 (CG, RWCS), 2022–23 (Dub, SA)
224	Heino Bezuidenhout	2018	4	2017–18 (HK, Sing, Fra), 2018 (RWCS)
225	Mosolwa Mafuma	2018	1	2017–18 (HK)
226	James Murphy	2018	20	2017–18 (HK, Sing), 2018–19 (HK), 2021 (Can: Van, Can: Edm), 2021–22 (Can, Fra, Lon, USA), 2022 (CG, RWCS), 2022–23 (Dub, SA, Aus, USA, Can, Fra, Lon), 2023–24 (Aus, USA)
227	Mfundo Ndhlovu	2018	23	2017–18 (HK, Fra), 2018–19 (USA, Fra), 2019–20 (USA, Can), 2021–22 (Esp: Mál, Esp: Sev, Sing, Fra, Lon), 2022 (CG, RWCS), 2022–23 (HK 2022, USA, Can, HK 2023, Sing, Fra, Lon), 2024–25 (SA, USA), 2025–26 (Dub)
228	Rhyno Smith	2018	2	2017–18 (HK, Fra)
229	Impi Visser	2018	59	2018–19 (Dub, SA, Ham, Aus, USA, Can, HK, Sing, Lon, Fra), 2019–20 (Ham, Aus, USA), 2021 (OG), 2021–22 (Dub I, Dub II, Esp: Mál, Esp: Sev, Can, Fra, Lon), 2022 (CG, RWCS), 2022–23 (HK 2022, Dub, SA, Ham, Aus, USA, Can, HK 2023, Sing, Fra, Lon), 2023 (AS), 2023–24 (Dub, SA, Can, USA, HK, Sing, Esp), 2024 (FOQT, OG), 2024–25 (Dub, SA, Aus, Can, HK, Sing, USA), 2025–26 (Dub, SA, Can, USA, HK, Esp, Fra)
230	JC Pretorius	2019	26	2018–19 (Aus, USA, Can, Lon, Fra), 2019–20 (Dub, SA, Ham, Aus, USA, Can), 2021 (OG), 2021 (Can: Van, Can: Edm), 2021–22 (Dub I, Dub II, Esp: Mál, Esp: Sev, Sing, Can, Fra, USA), 2022 (CG, RWCS), 2022–23 (HK 2022, Dub, SA)
231	Sako Makata	2019	19	2018–19 (USA, Can, HK, Sing, Lon, Fra), 2019–20 (Ham, Aus, USA, Can), 2021 (OG), 2021 (Can: Van Can: Edm), 2021–22 (Esp: Sev, Sing, Lon, USA), 2022 (CG, RWCS), 2022–23 (HK 2022)
232	Kurt-Lee Arendse	2019	9	2018–19 (Can, HK, Sing, Lon), 2019–20 (Dub, SA, USA, Can), 2021 (OG)
233	Angelo Davids	2019	12	2018–19 (HK, Sing), 2019–20 (Ham, Aus, USA, Can), 2021 (OG), 2021 (Can: Van), 2021–22 (Lon, USA), 2022 (CG, RWCS)
234	Darren Adonis	2021	14	2021 (Can: Van, Can: Edm), 2021–22 (Esp: Mál, Esp: Sev, Sing, Can, USA), 2022–23 (HK 2022, SA, Ham, Aus), 2023–24 (Can, USA, HK)
235	Ronald Brown	2021	28	2021 (Can: Van, Can: Edm), 2021–22 (Sing, Can, Fra, Lon), 2022 (CG, RWCS), 2022–23 (HK 2022, USA, Can, Fra, Lon), 2023 (AS), 2023–24 (Dub), SA, Aus, HK, 2024 (OG), 2024–25 (Dub, Aus, Can, USA), 2025–26 (Dub, SA, Can, USA, HK)
236	Christie Grobbelaar	2021	31	2021 (Can: Van, Can: Edm), 2021–22 (Dub I, Dub II, Esp: Mál, Esp: Sev, Sing, Can), 2022 (CG, RWCS), 2022–23 (Ham, Aus, USA, Can, HK 2023, Sing, Fra, Lon), 2023–24 (Dub, HK, Sing, Esp), 2024 (FOQT, OG), 2024–25 (Dub), 2025–26 (Dub, SA, Sing, Aus, Can), 2026–27 (Dub)
237	Shaun Williams	2021	22	2021 (Can: Van, Can: Edm), 2021–22 (Dub I, Dub II, Esp: Mál, Esp: Sev, Can, USA), 2022 (CG, RWCS), 2022–23 (Ham, Aus, HK 2023, Fra, Lon), 2023–24 (Can, USA, HK, Esp), 2024 (FOQT, OG), 2024–25 (SA)
238	Tiaan Pretorius	2021	10	2021–22 (Dub I, Dub II, Fra), 2022–23 (HK 2023, Sing), 2023–24 SA, Esp), 2024 (FOQT, OG)
239	Shilton van Wyk	2021	38	2021–22 (Dub I, Dub II, Can, USA), 2022–23 (HK 2022, Dub, SA, Aus, USA, Can, Fra, Lon), 2023 (AS), 2023–24 (Dub, SA, Aus, Can, USA, HK, Esp), 2024 (FOQT, OG), 2024–25 (Dub, SA, Aus, Can, HK, Sing, USA), 2025–26 (Dub, SA, Sing, Aus, Can, HK, Esp, Fra)
240	Lubabalo Dobela	2022	1	2021–22 (Sing)
241	Dalvon Blood	2022	5	2021–22 (Fra), 2022–23 (Dub, SA, Ham, Aus)
242	Jordan Hendrikse	2022	1	2021–22 (Lon)
243	Ricardo Duarttee	2022	27	2022–23 (Dub, SA, Ham, Aus, USA, Can, HK 2023, Sing, Fra, Lon), 2023 (AS), 2023–24 (Aus, Can), 2024–25 (Dub, SA, Aus, Can, HK, Sing, USA), 2025–26 (Dub, SA, Sing, Aus, Esp, Fra), 2026–27 (Dub)
244	Masande Mtshali	2022	8	2022–23 (Dub, SA, Ham, Aus, USA), 2023–24 (Dub, SA, Aus)
245	Jaiden Baron	2023	4	2022–23 (Ham, Aus, USA, Sing)
246	Travis Ismaiel	2023	6	2022–23 (USA, HK 2023, Sing, Fra, Lon), 2023 (AS)
247	Noegh Hayward	2023	1	2022–23 (Can)
248	Gurshwin Wehr	2023	1	2022–23 (Can)
249	Donavan Don	2023	17	2022–23 (HK 2023, Sing), 2023 (AS), 2023–24 (Aus), 2024–25 (Dub, SA, Aus, Can, HK, Sing), 2025–26 (Dub, SA, Sing, Aus, USA, HK, Fra)
250	Ethan James	2023	2	2022–23 (HK 2023, Sing)
251	Sebastiaan Jobb	2023	12	2022–23 (HK 2023, Sing), 2024–25 (Can, Sing), 2025–26 (Sing, Aus, Can, USA, HK, Esp, Fra), 2026–27 (Dub)
252	Katlego Letebele	2023	8	2023–24 (Dub, SA, Aus, Can, USA, HK, Sing), 2024 (OG)
253	Quewin Nortje	2023	18	2023–24 (Dub, SA, Aus, HK, Sing, Esp), 2024 (FOQT, OG), 2024–25 (Dub, SA, Aus, Can, HK, USA), 2025–26 (HK, Esp, Fra), 2026–27 (Dub)
254	David Brits	2023	17	2023–24 (Aus, Can, Can), 2024–25 (Dub, SA, Aus, Can, Sing, USA), 2025–26 (Dub, SA, Sing, Aus, Can, USA, HK, Fra)
255	Tristan Leyds	2024	23	2023–24 (Aus, Can, USA, Sing, Esp), 2024 (FOQT, OG), 2024–25 (Dub, SA, Can, HK, Sing, USA), 2025–26 (Dub, SA, Sing, Aus, Can, USA, HK, Esp, Fra), 2026–27 (Dub)
256	Zander Reynders	2024	10	2024–25 (SA, Aus, Can, HK, Sing, USA), 2025–26 (Dub, SA, Sing, Aus)
257	Gino Cupido	2025	4	2024–25 (HK), 2025–26 (Can, USA, Esp)
258	Nabo Sokoyi	2025	3	2025–26 (SA, Sing, AUS)
259	Luan Giliomee	2026	2	2025–26 (Sing, Aus)
260	Renaldo Young	2026	1	2025–26 (Aus)
261	Grant de Jager	2026	3	2025–26 (Can, USA), 2026–27 (Dub)
262	Jayden Nell	2026	4	2025–26 (USA, HK, Esp, Fra)
263	Van Reenen Kruger	2026	1	2026–27 (Dub)
264	JC Mars	2026	1	2026–27 (Dub)

Updated after the 2026 Dubai Sevens.

Legend
Yellow	Still Currently plays for the South Africa national rugby sevens team
Green	Also Played for the 15-a-side national team

Tournament abbreviations: Arg = Argentina, AS = Africa Sevens, Aus = Australia, Bei = Beijing, Can = Canada, Car = Cardiff, CG = Commonwealth Games, Dub = Dubai, Edm = Edmonton, Esp = Spain, Fiji = Fiji, FOQT = Final Olympic Qualification Tournament, Fra = France, Ham = Hamilton, HK = Hong Kong, Jap = Japan, KL = Kuala Lumpur, Lon = London, Mál = Málaga, OG = Olympic Games, RWCS = Rugby World Cup Sevens, SA = South Africa, San = Santiago, Sco = Scotland, Sev = Sevilla, Sha = Shanghai, Sing = Singapore, Ur = Uruguay, USA = United States of America, Van = Vancouver, Viña = Viña del Mar, Wel = Wellington, WG = World Games

== See also ==
- South Africa national rugby sevens team
- Rugby World Cup Sevens
- Sevens World Series
- Rugby sevens at the Commonwealth Games
- Rugby union at the World Games
