= Steven Hunt (rugby union) =

South African rugby union player

- Born: Steven Mark Hunt; 14 October 1988 (age 38) Port Elizabeth, South Africa
- Height: 1.79 m (5 ft 10 1/2 in)
- Weight: 81 kg (179 lb; 12 st 11 lb)

Rugby union career
- Position: Wing
Provincial / State sides
Years	Team	Apps	(Points)
2009, 2011	Western Province	4	(0)
National sevens team
Years	Team		Comps
2010–2014	South Africa Sevens		24
Medal record
Men's rugby sevens
Representing South Africa
World Games
Gold medal – first place	2013 Cali	Team competition

Steven Mark Hunt (born 14 October 1988) is a former South African rugby union player. He represented the South African sevens team between 2010 and 2014 and also played for Western Province in 2009 and 2011.

He announced his retirement from professional rugby in May 2015 to pursue his career as a commercial property broker.

== Career ==
=== Youth and Currie Cup ===
He attended Grey High School in Port Elizabeth, which earned him a selection for the Eastern Province Kings at youth level, playing for them at the 2006 Under-18 Academy Week competition and for the Eastern Province U19 side in the 2007 Under-19 Provincial Championship.

He then moved to Cape Town where he joined Western Province. He made his first class debut for them during the 2009 Currie Cup Premier Division, coming on as a replacement in their match against the Leopards. His next appearance for the side came almost two years later, starting their 2011 Currie Cup Premier Division match against the Pumas in Witbank. This was followed with two more appearances as a replacement against Griquas and the Leopards.

=== Sevens ===
Hunt became involved in rugby sevens with the South African Sevens team and made his debut during the 2010 Wellington Sevens leg of the 2009–10 IRB Sevens World Series.

He was named in the Blitzbokke squad for the Hong Kong and Japan legs of the Sevens Series. and came in as injury cover for the 2013 South Africa Sevens at the Nelson Mandela Bay Stadium in Port Elizabeth, where he was a member of the squad that defeated New Zealand 26–17 in the finals.

In 2014, he scored a hat trick against Kenya on Day 1 of the Gold Coast Sevens. It helped contribute to South Africa booking a spot in the quarter-finals.

Hunt sustained a fractured foot during training prior to the 2015 Hong Kong Sevens, which ruled him out for the rest of the series.
