= Chris Dirks =

South African rugby union player

- Born: Chris Armand Dirks; 23 May 1967 (age 59) Sasolburg, Free State
- Height: 1.87 m (6 ft 2 in)
- Weight: 90 kg (198 lb)
- School: High School Secunda
- University: Rand Afrikaans University

Rugby union career
Provincial / State sides
Years	Team	Apps	(Points)
1991–1994	Transvaal	48	
International career
Years	Team	Apps	(Points)
1993	South Africa		
National sevens team
Years	Team		Comps
1994	South Africa 7s		1

Chris Armand Dirks (born 23 May 1967) is a South African former rugby union player.

== Playing career ==
A product of the Secunda High School in Mpumalanga and the Rand Afrikaans University in Johannesburg, Dirks represented Transvaal in the South African provincial rugby competitions. At the end of the 1993 season, he toured with the Springboks to Argentina. Dirks did not play in any test matches but played in two tour matches, scoring two tries for the Springboks.

== See also ==
- List of South Africa national rugby union players – Springbok no. 597
- List of South Africa national rugby sevens players
