= Philip Smit =

South African rugby union player

- Born: Phillippus Lodewicus Smit; 27 July 1973 (age 53) Burgersdorp, Cape Province
- Height: 1.96 m (6 ft 5 in)
- Weight: 107 kg (236 lb)
- School: Marlow Agricultural High School, Cradock

Rugby union career
- Position(s): Lock, Flank
Provincial / State sides
Years	Team	Apps	(Points)
1996–1999	Griquas	62	(30)
2001–2000	Natal	23	(15)
Super Rugby
Years	Team	Apps	(Points)
1998–1999	Cats	19	(0)
2000–2003	Sharks	29	(10)
International career
Years	Team	Apps	(Points)
1997–1998	South Africa (tour)	5	
National sevens team
Years	Team		Comps
1998	South Africa 7s		2

Phillippus Lodewicus Smit (born 27 July 1973) is a South African former rugby union player.

== Playing career ==
Smit matriculated at Marlow Agricultural High School in Cradock and represented North Eastern Cape at the 1991 Craven Week tournament. He made his senior provincial debut for Griquas in 1996.

Smit toured with the Springboks to Europe in 1997 and 1998 and played in five tour matches. In 1998, he represented South Africa at sevens.

== See also ==
- List of South Africa national rugby union players – Springbok no. 660
- List of South Africa national rugby sevens players
