= 2008 Adelaide Sevens =

- IRB Sevens IX
- Host nation: Australia
- Date: 5–6 April 2008

Cup
- Champion: South Africa
- Runner-up: New Zealand

Plate
- Winner: Tonga
- Runner-up: Kenya

Bowl
- Winner: United States
- Runner-up: Argentina

Shield
- Winner: Wales
- Runner-up: Canada

The 2008 Adelaide Sevens, promoted as the International Rugby Sevens Adelaide 2008, was a rugby sevens tournament that was part of the IRB Sevens World Series in the 2007–08 season. It was the Australian Sevens leg of the series, held on the weekend of 5 and 6 April at the Adelaide Oval in South Australia.

South Africa halted New Zealand's winning streak, defeating them 15–7 in the Cup final. The Cook Islands provided the biggest upset of the competition by finishing 2nd in their group, thus qualifying to the Cup competition; they would parachute into the Plate competition after a 48–0 drubbing by Samoa in the Cup quarterfinals. Ultimately, Tonga won the Plate, defeating Kenya 14–12. Argentina won the Bowl and Wales won the Shield.

== Format ==
The teams were drawn into four pools of four teams each. Each team played the other teams in their pool once, with 3 points awarded for a win, 2 points for a draw, and 1 point for a loss (no points awarded for a forfeit). The top two teams from each pool advanced to the Cup/Plate brackets. The bottom two teams from each group went on to the Bowl/Shield brackets.

== Teams ==
The participating teams were:

- Argentina
- Australia
- Canada
- Cook Islands
- England
- Fiji
- France
- Japan
- Kenya
- New Zealand
- Samoa
- Scotland
- South Africa
- Tonga
- United States
- Wales

== Pool stage ==
Play on the first day of the tournament consisted of matches between teams in the same pool on a round robin basis. The following is a list of the recorded results.

=== Pool A ===
| Team | Pld | W | D | L | PF | PA | +/- | Pts |
|---|---|---|---|---|---|---|---|---|
| New Zealand | 3 | 3 | 0 | 0 | 92 | 31 | +61 | 9 |
| Cook Islands | 3 | 1 | 0 | 2 | 64 | 76 | -12 | 5 |
| Argentina | 3 | 1 | 0 | 2 | 54 | 78 | -24 | 5 |
| Scotland | 3 | 1 | 0 | 2 | 49 | 74 | -25 | 5 |

| Date | Team 1 | Score | Team 2 |
| 5 April 2008 | New Zealand | 21 - 14 | Argentina |
| 5 April 2008 | Scotland | 22 - 17 | Cook Islands |
| 5 April 2008 | New Zealand | 33 - 7 | Cook Islands |
| 5 April 2008 | Scotland | 17 - 19 | Argentina |
| 5 April 2008 | Argentina | 21 - 40 | Cook Islands |
| 5 April 2008 | New Zealand | 38 - 10 | Scotland |

=== Pool B ===
| Team | Pld | W | D | L | PF | PA | +/- | Pts |
|---|---|---|---|---|---|---|---|---|
| Samoa | 3 | 3 | 0 | 0 | 73 | 55 | +18 | 9 |
| Tonga | 3 | 2 | 0 | 1 | 84 | 31 | +53 | 7 |
| Wales | 3 | 1 | 0 | 2 | 60 | 64 | -4 | 5 |
| Japan | 3 | 0 | 0 | 3 | 43 | 110 | -67 | 3 |

| Date | Team 1 | Score | Team 2 |
| 5 April 2008 | Samoa | 28 - 17 | Wales |
| 5 April 2008 | Tonga | 53 - 0 | Japan |
| 5 April 2008 | Samoa | 31 - 26 | Japan |
| 5 April 2008 | Tonga | 19 - 17 | Wales |
| 5 April 2008 | Wales | 26 - 17 | Japan |
| 5 April 2008 | Samoa | 14 - 12 | Tonga |

=== Pool C ===
| Team | Pld | W | D | L | PF | PA | +/- | Pts |
|---|---|---|---|---|---|---|---|---|
| South Africa | 3 | 3 | 0 | 0 | 83 | 24 | +59 | 9 |
| Australia | 3 | 2 | 0 | 1 | 59 | 52 | +7 | 7 |
| United States | 3 | 1 | 0 | 2 | 38 | 91 | -53 | 5 |
| Canada | 3 | 0 | 0 | 3 | 48 | 61 | -13 | 3 |

| Date | Team 1 | Score | Team 2 |
| 5 April 2008 | South Africa | 43 - 0 | United States |
| 5 April 2008 | Australia | 21 - 14 | Canada |
| 5 April 2008 | South Africa | 21 - 17 | Canada |
| 5 April 2008 | Australia | 31 - 19 | United States |
| 5 April 2008 | United States | 19 - 17 | Canada |
| 5 April 2008 | South Africa | 19 - 7 | Australia |

=== Pool D ===
| Team | Pld | W | D | L | PF | PA | +/- | Pts |
|---|---|---|---|---|---|---|---|---|
| Fiji | 3 | 3 | 0 | 0 | 93 | 38 | +55 | 9 |
| Kenya | 3 | 2 | 0 | 1 | 52 | 51 | +1 | 7 |
| France | 3 | 1 | 0 | 2 | 43 | 66 | -23 | 5 |
| England | 3 | 0 | 0 | 3 | 34 | 67 | -33 | 3 |

| Date | Team 1 | Score | Team 2 |
| 5 April 2008 | Fiji | 31 - 12 | England |
| 5 April 2008 | Kenya | 21 - 12 | France |
| 5 April 2008 | Fiji | 33 - 12 | France |
| 5 April 2008 | Kenya | 17 - 10 | England |
| 5 April 2008 | England | 12 - 19 | France |
| 5 April 2008 | Fiji | 29 - 14 | Kenya |

== Knockout ==
Play on the second day of the tournament consisted of finals matches for the Shield, Bowl, Plate, and Cup competitions. The following is a list of the recorded results.

=== Shield ===
Quarter-finals
6 April - Adelaide, Australia
Argentina | 24
Japan | 12
6 April - Adelaide, Australia
France | 28
Canada | 19
6 April - Adelaide, Australia
United States | 26
England | 19
6 April - Adelaide, Australia
Wales | 12
Scotland | 17

Semi-finals
6 April - Adelaide, Australia
Japan | 19
Canada | 24
6 April - Adelaide, Australia
England | 14
Wales | 19

Final
6 April - Adelaide, Australia
Canada | 7
Wales | 12

=== Bowl ===
Quarter-finals
6 April - Adelaide, Australia
Argentina | 24
Japan | 12
6 April - Adelaide, Australia
France | 28
Canada | 19
6 April - Adelaide, Australia
United States | 26
England | 19
6 April - Adelaide, Australia
Wales | 12
Scotland | 17

Semi-finals
6 April - Adelaide, Australia
Argentina | 24
France | 12
6 April - Adelaide, Australia
United States | 29
Scotland | 14

Final
6 April - Adelaide, Australia
Argentina | 26
United States | 21

=== Plate ===
Quarter-finals
6 April - Adelaide, Australia
New Zealand | 19
Tonga | 14
6 April - Adelaide, Australia
Fiji | 28
Australia | 7
6 April - Adelaide, Australia
South Africa | 19
Kenya | 5
6 April - Adelaide, Australia
Samoa | 48
Cook Islands | 0

Semi-finals
6 April - Adelaide, Australia
Tonga | 21
Australia | 7
6 April - Adelaide, Australia
Kenya | 26
Cook Islands | 14

Final
6 April - Adelaide, Australia
Tonga | 14
Kenya | 12

=== Cup ===
Quarter-finals
6 April - Adelaide, Australia
New Zealand | 19
Tonga | 14
6 April - Adelaide, Australia
Fiji | 28
Australia | 7
6 April - Adelaide, Australia
South Africa | 19
Kenya | 5
6 April - Adelaide, Australia
Samoa | 48
Cook Islands | 0

Semi-finals
6 April - Adelaide, Australia
New Zealand | 17
Fiji | 14
6 April - Adelaide, Australia
South Africa | 17
Samoa | 12

Final
6 April - Adelaide, Australia
New Zealand | 7
South Africa | 15
