= 2015 Scotland Sevens =

Rugby sevens tournament

- Sevens World Series XVI
- Host nation: Scotland
- Date: 9–10 May 2015

Cup
- Champion: Fiji
- Runner-up: New Zealand
- Third: England

Plate
- Winner: South Africa
- Runner-up: Scotland

Bowl
- Winner: Wales
- Runner-up: Argentina

Shield
- Winner: Samoa
- Runner-up: Portugal

Tournament details
- Matches played: 45
- Tries scored: 230 (average 5.11 per match)

The 2015 Scotland Sevens was the eighth tournament within the 2014–15 Sevens World Series. This year's Scotland Sevens tournament was held over the weekend of 9–10 May 2015 at Scotstoun Stadium in Glasgow.

== Format ==
The teams were drawn into four pools of four teams each. Each team will play everyone in their pool once. The top two teams from each pool advance to the Cup/Plate brackets. The bottom two teams go into the Bowl/Shield brackets.

== Teams ==
The pools and schedule were announced on 5 April 2015.

- Argentina
- Australia
- Canada
- England
- Fiji
- France
- Japan
- Kenya
- New Zealand
- Portugal
- Russia
- Samoa
- Scotland
- South Africa
- United States
- Wales

== Pool Stage ==
Key to colours in group tables
Teams that advanced to the Cup Quarterfinal

=== Pool A ===
Teams	Pld	W	D	L	PF	PA	+/−	Pts
Australia	3	2	1	0	86	29	+57	8
England	3	2	1	0	86	31	+55	8
France	3	1	0	2	35	83	–48	5
Russia	3	0	0	3	31	95	–64	3

9 May 2015
11:14

England	17–17	Australia
	Report

Scotstoun Stadium

9 May 2015
11:36

France	21–19	Russia
	Report

Scotstoun Stadium

9 May 2015
14:20

England	43–7	Russia
	Report

Scotstoun Stadium

9 May 2015
14:42

France	7–38	Australia
	Report

Scotstoun Stadium

9 May 2015
17:31

Australia	31–5	Russia
	Report

Scotstoun Stadium

9 May 2015
17:53

England	26–7	France
	Report

Scotstoun Stadium

=== Pool B ===
Teams	Pld	W	D	L	PF	PA	+/−	Pts
New Zealand	3	3	0	0	72	45	+27	9
South Africa	3	2	0	1	60	41	+19	7
Kenya	3	1	0	2	41	66	−25	5
Samoa	3	0	0	3	53	74	−21	3

9 May 2015
11:58

South Africa	19–12	Samoa
	Report

Scotstoun Stadium

9 May 2015
12:20

New Zealand	22–7	Kenya
	Report

Scotstoun Stadium

9 May 2015
15:04

South Africa	22–5	Kenya
	Report

Scotstoun Stadium

9 May 2015
15:26

New Zealand	26–19	Samoa
	Report

Scotstoun Stadium

9 May 2015
18:15

Samoa	22–29	Kenya
	Report

Scotstoun Stadium

9 May 2015
18:37

South Africa	19–24	New Zealand
	Report

Scotstoun Stadium

=== Pool C ===
Teams	Pld	W	D	L	PF	PA	+/−	Pts
Fiji	3	3	0	0	125	34	+91	9
Scotland	3	2	0	1	36	66	−30	7
Wales	3	1	0	2	66	59	+7	5
Portugal	3	0	0	3	33	101	−68	3

9 May 2015
12:42

Fiji	40–17	Wales
	Report

Scotstoun Stadium

9 May 2015
13:04

Scotland	19–14	Portugal
	Report

Scotstoun Stadium

9 May 2015
15:48

Fiji	40–12	Portugal
	Report

Scotstoun Stadium

9 May 2015
16:10

Scotland	12–7	Wales
	Report

Scotstoun Stadium

9 May 2015
18:59

Wales	42–7	Portugal
	Report

Scotstoun Stadium

9 May 2015
19:21

Fiji	45–5	Scotland
	Report

Scotstoun Stadium

=== Pool D ===
Teams	Pld	W	D	L	PF	PA	+/−	Pts
Canada	3	2	0	1	90	21	+69	7
United States	3	2	0	1	59	61	−2	7
Argentina	3	1	1	1	47	45	+2	6
Japan	3	0	1	2	19	88	–69	4

9 May 2015
10:30

Canada	40–0	United States
	Report

Scotstoun Stadium

9 May 2015
10:52

Japan	12–12	Argentina
	Report

Scotstoun Stadium

9 May 2015
13:36

Canada	12–21	Argentina
	Report

Scotstoun Stadium

9 May 2015
13:58

Japan	7–38	United States
	Report

Scotstoun Stadium

9 May 2015
16:47

United States	21–14	Argentina
	Report

Scotstoun Stadium

9 May 2015
17:09

Canada	38–0	Japan
	Report

Scotstoun Stadium

== Knockout stage ==
=== Shield ===
Quarter-finals
10 May 2015 – 10:30 – Scotstoun Stadium
France	19
Japan	0
10 May 2015 – 10:52 – Scotstoun Stadium
Wales	5
Samoa	0
10 May 2015 – 11:14 – Scotstoun Stadium
Argentina	14
Russia	0
10 May 2015 – 11:36 – Scotstoun Stadium
Kenya	12
Portugal	0

Semi-finals
10 May 2015 – 13:46 – Scotstoun Stadium
Japan	14
Samoa	24
10 May 2015 – 14:08 – Scotstoun Stadium
Russia	7
Portugal	10

Final
10 May 2015 – 16:52 – Scotstoun Stadium
Samoa	22
Portugal	12

=== Bowl ===
Quarter-finals
10 May 2015 – 10:30 – Scotstoun Stadium
France	19
Japan	0
10 May 2015 – 10:52 – Scotstoun Stadium
Wales	5
Samoa	0
10 May 2015 – 11:14 – Scotstoun Stadium
Argentina	14
Russia	0
10 May 2015 – 11:36 – Scotstoun Stadium
Kenya	12
Portugal	0

Semi-finals
10 May 2015 – 14:30 – Scotstoun Stadium
France	5
Wales	12
10 May 2015 – 14:52 – Scotstoun Stadium
Argentina	24
Kenya	7

Final
10 May 2015 – 17:20 – Scotstoun Stadium
Wales	12
Argentina	7

=== Plate ===
Quarter-finals
10 May 2015 – 11:58 – Scotstoun Stadium
Australia	7
United States	14
10 May 2015 – 12:20 – Scotstoun Stadium
Fiji	15
South Africa	0
10 May 2015 – 12:42 – Scotstoun Stadium
Canada	7
England	14
10 May 2015 – 13:04 – Scotstoun Stadium
New Zealand	17
Scotland	7

Semi-finals
10 May 2015 – 15:14 – Scotstoun Stadium
Australia	12
South Africa	21
10 May 2015 – 15:36 – Scotstoun Stadium
Canada	12
Scotland	14

Final
10 May 2015 – 17:48 – Scotstoun Stadium
South Africa	12
Scotland	10

=== Cup ===
Quarter-finals
10 May 2015 – 11:58 – Scotstoun Stadium
Australia	7
United States	14
10 May 2015 – 12:20 – Scotstoun Stadium
Fiji	15
South Africa	0
10 May 2015 – 12:42 – Scotstoun Stadium
Canada	7
England	14
10 May 2015 – 13:04 – Scotstoun Stadium
New Zealand	17
Scotland	7

Semi-finals
10 May 2015 – 15:58 – Scotstoun Stadium
United States	5
Fiji	19
10 May 2015 – 16:20 – Scotstoun Stadium
England	0
New Zealand	5

Final
10 May 2015 – 18:50 – Scotstoun Stadium
Fiji	24
New Zealand	17
Third place
10 May 2015 – 18:16 – Scotstoun Stadium
United States	19
England	24
