= 2012 USA Sevens =

- Host nation: United States
- Date: 10–12 February 2012

Cup
- Champion: Samoa
- Runner-up: New Zealand
- Third: Fiji

Plate
- Winner: Kenya
- Runner-up: Argentina

Bowl
- Winner: Canada
- Runner-up: Australia

Shield
- Winner: France
- Runner-up: Scotland

Tournament details
- Matches played: 45
- Tries scored: 229 (average 5.09 per match)
- Most points: (New Zealand) Junior Tomasi Cama (44 points)
- Most tries: (South Africa) Cecil Afrika (7 tries)

The 2012 USA Sevens was the ninth edition of the USA Sevens tournament and the fifth tournament of the 2011–12 IRB Sevens World Series. The host stadium was the Sam Boyd Stadium.

Samoa won the title by defeating New Zealand 26–19 in the final.

== Format ==
The teams were divided into pools of four teams, who played a round-robin within the pool. Points were awarded in each pool on a different schedule from most rugby tournaments—3 for a win, 2 for a draw, 1 for a loss. The top two teams in each pool advanced to the Cup competition. The four quarterfinal losers dropped into the bracket for the Plate. The Bowl was contested by the third- and fourth-place finishers in each pool, with the losers in the Bowl quarterfinals dropping into the bracket for the Shield.

== Teams ==
16 teams participated:

- Argentina
- Australia
- Brazil
- Canada
- England
- Fiji
- France
- Japan
- Kenya
- New Zealand
- Samoa
- Scotland
- South Africa
- United States
- Uruguay
- Wales

== Pool stage ==
The draw was made on February 4.

Key to colours in group tables
Teams that advance to the Cup Quarterfinal

=== Pool A ===
Teams	Pld	W	D	L	PF	PA	+/−	Pts
New Zealand	3	3	0	0	85	15	+70	9
Samoa	3	2	0	1	57	27	+30	7
Australia	3	1	0	2	30	57	−27	5
Japan	3	0	0	3	12	85	−73	3

10 February 2012
18:12

New Zealand	31 – 5	Australia
	Report

Sam Boyd Stadium, Las Vegas

10 February 2012
18:34

Samoa	33 – 0	Japan

Sam Boyd Stadium, Las Vegas

10 February 2012
21:08

New Zealand	42 – 5	Japan
	Report

Sam Boyd Stadium, Las Vegas

10 February 2012
21:30

Samoa	19 – 15	Australia
	Report

Sam Boyd Stadium, Las Vegas

11 February 2012
12:44

Australia	10 – 7	Japan

Sam Boyd Stadium, Las Vegas

11 February 2012
14:12

New Zealand	12 – 5	Samoa

Sam Boyd Stadium, Las Vegas

=== Pool B ===
Teams	Pld	W	D	L	PF	PA	+/−	Pts
Fiji	3	3	0	0	66	41	+25	9
Argentina	3	2	0	1	45	38	+7	7
Canada	3	1	0	2	41	50	−9	5
United States	3	0	0	3	43	66	−23	3

10 February 2012
16:00

Fiji	14 – 12	Argentina
	Report

Sam Boyd Stadium, Las Vegas

10 February 2012
16:22

Canada	19 – 12	United States
	Report

Sam Boyd Stadium, Las Vegas

10 February 2012
18:56

Fiji	33 – 19	United States
	Report

Sam Boyd Stadium, Las Vegas

10 February 2012
19:18

Canada	12 – 19	Argentina
	Report

Sam Boyd Stadium, Las Vegas

11 February 2012
13:06

Fiji	19 – 10	Canada

Sam Boyd Stadium, Las Vegas

11 February 2012
14:34

Argentina	14 – 12	United States
	Report

Sam Boyd Stadium, Las Vegas

=== Pool C ===
Teams	Pld	W	D	L	PF	PA	+/−	Pts
South Africa	3	3	0	0	97	17	+80	9
Wales	3	2	0	1	54	48	+6	7
France	3	1	0	2	38	66	−28	5
Uruguay	3	0	0	3	26	84	−58	3

10 February 2012
16:44

France	12 – 14	Wales

Sam Boyd Stadium, Las Vegas

10 February 2012
17:06

South Africa	35 – 0	Uruguay

Sam Boyd Stadium, Las Vegas

10 February 2012
19:40

France	21 – 19	Uruguay

Sam Boyd Stadium, Las Vegas

10 February 2012
20:02

South Africa	29 – 12	Wales
	Report

Sam Boyd Stadium, Las Vegas

11 February 2012
12:22

Wales	28 – 7	Uruguay

Sam Boyd Stadium, Las Vegas

11 February 2012
13:50

France	5 – 33	South Africa

Sam Boyd Stadium, Las Vegas

=== Pool D ===
Teams	Pld	W	D	L	PF	PA	+/−	Pts
Kenya	3	2	1	0	62	21	+41	7
England	3	2	1	0	48	19	+29	7
Scotland	3	1	0	2	54	34	+20	5
Brazil	3	0	0	3	10	100	−90	3

10 February 2012
17:28

Kenya	17 – 14	Scotland
	Report

Sam Boyd Stadium, Las Vegas

10 February 2012
17:50

England	29 – 5	Brazil
	Report

Sam Boyd Stadium, Las Vegas

10 February 2012
20:24

Kenya	38 – 0	Brazil
	Report

Sam Boyd Stadium, Las Vegas

10 February 2012
20:46

England	12 – 7	Scotland
	Report

Sam Boyd Stadium, Las Vegas

11 February 2012
12:00

Scotland	33 – 5	Brazil
	Report

Sam Boyd Stadium, Las Vegas

11 February 2012
13:28

Kenya	7 – 7	England
	Report

Sam Boyd Stadium, Las Vegas

== Knockout stage ==
=== Shield ===
Quarter-finals
11 February – Las Vegas
Australia	50
Brazil	0
11 February – Las Vegas
France	5
United States	21
11 February – Las Vegas
Scotland	14
Japan	15
11 February – Las Vegas
Canada	29
Uruguay	0

Semi-finals
12 February – Las Vegas
Brazil	7
France	33
12 February – Las Vegas
Scotland	40
Uruguay	12

Final
12 February – Las Vegas
France	22
Scotland	7

=== Bowl ===
Quarter-finals
11 February – Las Vegas
Australia	50
Brazil	0
11 February – Las Vegas
France	5
United States	21
11 February – Las Vegas
Scotland	14
Japan	15
11 February – Las Vegas
Canada	29
Uruguay	0

Semi-finals
12 February – Las Vegas
Australia	19
United States	14
12 February – Las Vegas
Japan	5
Canada	21

Final
12 February – Las Vegas
Australia	17
Canada	19

=== Plate ===
Quarter-finals
11 February – Las Vegas
New Zealand	12
England	7
11 February – Las Vegas
South Africa	24
Argentina	5
11 February – Las Vegas
Kenya	14
Samoa	19
11 February – Las Vegas
Fiji	12
Wales	5

Semi-finals
12 February – Las Vegas
England	19
Argentina	21
12 February – Las Vegas
Kenya	22
Wales	14

Final
12 February – Las Vegas
Argentina	7
Kenya	21

=== Cup ===
Quarter-finals
11 February – Las Vegas
New Zealand	12
England	7
11 February – Las Vegas
South Africa	24
Argentina	5
11 February – Las Vegas
Kenya	14
Samoa	19
11 February – Las Vegas
Fiji	12
Wales	5

Semi-finals
12 February – Las Vegas
New Zealand	20
South Africa	7
12 February – Las Vegas
Samoa	14
Fiji	12

Final
12 February – Las Vegas
New Zealand	19
Samoa	26
Third place
12 February – Las Vegas
Fiji	21
South Africa	15

== Television ==
The 2012 USA Sevens earned strong ratings on TV in the US, with higher ratings than several basketball and hockey games on TV that weekend. The TV ratings for selected sports events on network and cable TV that weekend are below:

- 0.7 USA Sevens Rugby
- 0.4 NHL: Detroit v. Philadelphia
- 0.3 NCAA: Alabama v. LSU
- 0.1 NCAA: Wichita v. Creighton
- 0.1 NCAA: Xavier v. Temple
- 0.1 NCAA: Utah St. v. New Mexico St.
- 0.1 NCAA: Ark - Little Rock v. Middle Tenn. St.
