= 2011 South Africa Sevens =

- Host nation: South Africa
- Date: 9–10 December 2011

Cup
- Champion: New Zealand
- Runner-up: South Africa
- Third: Samoa

Plate
- Winner: Wales
- Runner-up: Fiji

Bowl
- Winner: Scotland
- Runner-up: Canada

Shield
- Winner: Zimbabwe
- Runner-up: Kenya

Tournament details
- Matches played: 45
- Tries scored: 257 (average 5.71 per match)
- Most points: (New Zealand) Frank Halai (New Zealand) Junior Tomasi Cama (50 points)
- Most tries: (New Zealand) Frank Halai (10 tries)

The 2011 South Africa Sevens was the 13th edition of the tournament and was part of the 2011–12 IRB Sevens World Series. After nine seasons at George in the Western Cape, the competition moved to Nelson Mandela Bay Stadium in Port Elizabeth.

New Zealand won the title by defeating South Africa 31–26 in the final.

== Format ==
The teams were divided into pools of four teams, who played a round-robin within the pool. Points were awarded in each pool on a different schedule from most rugby tournaments—3 for a win, 2 for a draw, 1 for a loss. The top two teams in each pool advanced to the Cup competition. The four quarterfinal losers dropped into the bracket for the Plate. The Bowl was contested by the third- and fourth-place finishers in each pool, with the losers in the Bowl quarterfinals dropping into the bracket for the Shield.

== Teams ==
The participating teams are:

- Argentina
- Australia
- Canada
- England
- Fiji
- France
- Kenya
- Morocco
- New Zealand
- Portugal
- Samoa
- Scotland
- South Africa
- United States
- Wales
- Zimbabwe

== Pool stage ==
The draw was made on 4 December.

Key to colours in group tables
Teams that advanced to the Cup Quarterfinal

All times are local (UTC+2).

=== Pool A ===
Teams	Pld	W	D	L	PF	PA	+/−	Pts
Samoa	3	3	0	0	55	31	+24	9
England	3	2	0	1	59	31	+28	7
United States	3	1	0	2	40	54	−14	5
Argentina	3	0	0	3	19	57	−38	3

9 December 2011
12:21

England	26–7	United States
	Report

Nelson Mandela Bay Stadium, Port Elizabeth

9 December 2011
12:43

Argentina	5–17	Samoa
	Report

Nelson Mandela Bay Stadium, Port Elizabeth

9 December 2011
15:27

England	14–24	Samoa

Nelson Mandela Bay Stadium, Port Elizabeth

9 December 2011
15:49

Argentina	14–21	United States
	Report

Nelson Mandela Bay Stadium, Port Elizabeth

9 December 2011
18:11

United States	12–14	Samoa
	Report

Nelson Mandela Bay Stadium, Port Elizabeth

9 December 2011
19:54

England	19–0	Argentina
	Report

Nelson Mandela Bay Stadium, Port Elizabeth

=== Pool B ===
Teams	Pld	W	D	L	PF	PA	+/−	Pts
New Zealand	3	3	0	0	125	7	+118	9
France	3	2	0	1	50	55	−5	7
Scotland	3	1	0	2	57	76	−19	5
Morocco	3	0	0	3	14	108	−94	3

9 December 2011
13:05

France	31–7	Scotland

Nelson Mandela Bay Stadium, Port Elizabeth

9 December 2011
13:27

New Zealand	39–7	Morocco

Nelson Mandela Bay Stadium, Port Elizabeth

9 December 2011
16:11

France	19–7	Morocco

Nelson Mandela Bay Stadium, Port Elizabeth

9 December 2011
16:33

New Zealand	45–0	Scotland
	Report

Nelson Mandela Bay Stadium, Port Elizabeth

9 December 2011
18:33

Scotland	50–0	Morocco

Nelson Mandela Bay Stadium, Port Elizabeth

9 December 2011
20:16

France	0–41	New Zealand
	Report

Nelson Mandela Bay Stadium, Port Elizabeth

=== Pool C ===
Teams	Pld	W	D	L	PF	PA	+/−	Pts
South Africa	3	3	0	0	104	0	+104	9
Australia	3	2	0	1	64	50	+14	7
Canada	3	1	0	2	36	71	−35	5
Kenya	3	0	0	3	19	102	−83	3

9 December 2011
13:49

South Africa	33–0	Canada

Nelson Mandela Bay Stadium, Port Elizabeth

9 December 2011
14:11

Australia	31–14	Kenya

Nelson Mandela Bay Stadium, Port Elizabeth

9 December 2011
16:55

South Africa	45–0	Kenya

Nelson Mandela Bay Stadium, Port Elizabeth

9 December 2011
17:17

Australia	33–10	Canada

Nelson Mandela Bay Stadium, Port Elizabeth

9 December 2011
18:55

Canada	26–5	Kenya

Nelson Mandela Bay Stadium, Port Elizabeth

9 December 2011
20:38

South Africa	26–0	Australia
	Report

Nelson Mandela Bay Stadium, Port Elizabeth

=== Pool D ===
Teams	Pld	W	D	L	PF	PA	+/−	Pts
Fiji	3	3	0	0	102	38	+64	9
Wales	3	2	0	1	90	43	+47	7
Portugal	3	1	0	2	38	77	−39	5
Zimbabwe	3	0	0	3	36	108	−72	3

9 December 2011
11:37

Fiji	31–7	Portugal
	Report

Nelson Mandela Bay Stadium, Port Elizabeth

9 December 2011
11:59

Wales	42–7	Zimbabwe
	Report

Nelson Mandela Bay Stadium, Port Elizabeth

9 December 2011
14:43

Fiji	42–17	Zimbabwe

Nelson Mandela Bay Stadium, Port Elizabeth

9 December 2011
15:05

Wales	34–7	Portugal

Nelson Mandela Bay Stadium, Port Elizabeth

9 December 2011
17:49

Portugal	24–12	Zimbabwe
	Report

Nelson Mandela Bay Stadium, Port Elizabeth

9 December 2011
19:32

Fiji	29–14	Wales
	Report

Nelson Mandela Bay Stadium, Port Elizabeth

== Knockout stage ==
=== Shield ===
Quarter-finals
10 December – Port Elizabeth
United States	26
Zimbabwe	0
10 December – Port Elizabeth
Canada	21
Morocco	0
10 December – Port Elizabeth
Portugal	12
Argentina	28
10 December – Port Elizabeth
Scotland	26
Kenya	7

Semi-finals
10 December – Port Elizabeth
Zimbabwe	21
Morocco	14
10 December – Port Elizabeth
Portugal	12
Kenya	17

Final
10 December – Port Elizabeth
Zimbabwe	19
Kenya	12

=== Bowl ===
Quarter-finals
10 December – Port Elizabeth
United States	26
Zimbabwe	0
10 December – Port Elizabeth
Canada	21
Morocco	0
10 December – Port Elizabeth
Portugal	12
Argentina	28
10 December – Port Elizabeth
Scotland	26
Kenya	7

Semi-finals
10 December – Port Elizabeth
United States	12
Canada	22
10 December – Port Elizabeth
Argentina	14
Scotland	21

Final
10 December – Port Elizabeth
Canada	19
Scotland	22

=== Plate ===
Quarter-finals
10 December – Port Elizabeth
Samoa	21
Wales	12
10 December – Port Elizabeth
South Africa	26
France	12
10 December – Port Elizabeth
Fiji	14
England	21
10 December – Port Elizabeth
New Zealand	21
Australia	5

Semi-finals
10 December – Port Elizabeth
Wales	24
France	20
10 December – Port Elizabeth
Fiji	26
Australia	7

Final
10 December – Port Elizabeth
Wales	48
Fiji	0

=== Cup ===
Quarter-finals
10 December – Port Elizabeth
Samoa	21
Wales	12
10 December – Port Elizabeth
South Africa	26
France	12
10 December – Port Elizabeth
Fiji	14
England	21
10 December – Port Elizabeth
New Zealand	21
Australia	5

Semi-finals
10 December – Port Elizabeth
Samoa	7
South Africa	12
10 December – Port Elizabeth
England	14
New Zealand	19

Final
10 December – Port Elizabeth
South Africa	26
New Zealand	31
Third place
10 December – Port Elizabeth
Samoa	17
England	14
