= 2007 South Africa Sevens =

The South Africa Sevens is played annually as part of the IRB Sevens World Series for international rugby sevens (seven-a-side version of rugby union). The 2007 competition, which took place on 7 December and 8 December at Outeniqua Park in George, Western Cape, was the second Cup trophy in the 2007–08 IRB Sevens World Series.

In a rematch of the Cup final from the first event in the 2007–08 series, the Dubai Sevens, New Zealand successfully defended their South Africa title by defeating Fiji. The second-level Plate final matched two surprise finalists, with Kenya narrowly defeating a USA team boosted by the presence of emerging 15s star Takudzwa Ngwenya. The Bowl was won by Wales who came from behind to win 21–19 against England. Canada took home the Shield.

== Pool stages ==
=== Pool A ===
Team	Pld	W	D	L	PF	PA	+/-	Pts
New Zealand	3	3	0	0	86	24	+62	9
Kenya	3	2	0	1	32	36	-4	7
England	3	1	0	2	55	50	+5	5
Zimbabwe	3	0	0	3	17	80	-63	3

Date	Team 1	Score	Team 2
7 December 2007	New Zealand	19 – 0	Kenya
7 December 2007	England	24 – 7	Zimbabwe
7 December 2007	New Zealand	41 – 0	Zimbabwe
7 December 2007	England	7 – 17	Kenya
7 December 2007	Kenya	15 – 10	Zimbabwe
7 December 2007	New Zealand	26 – 24	England

=== Pool B ===
Team	Pld	W	D	L	PF	PA	+/-	Pts
Fiji	3	3	0	0	110	19	+91	9
United States	3	2	0	1	36	64	-28	7
France	3	1	0	2	48	62	-14	5
Canada	3	0	0	3	19	68	-49	3

Date	Team 1	Score	Team 2
7 December 2007	Fiji	29 – 0	Canada
7 December 2007	France	12 – 14	United States
7 December 2007	Fiji	47 – 7	United States
7 December 2007	France	24 – 14	Canada
7 December 2007	Canada	5 – 15	United States
7 December 2007	Fiji	34 – 12	France

=== Pool C ===
Team	Pld	W	D	L	PF	PA	+/-	Pts
South Africa	3	3	0	0	96	7	+89	9
Argentina	3	2	0	1	69	43	+26	7
Wales	3	1	0	2	50	55	-5	5
Uganda	3	0	0	3	7	117	-100	3

Date	Team 1	Score	Team 2
7 December 2007	South Africa	24 – 7	Argentina
7 December 2007	Wales	38 – 0	Uganda
7 December 2007	South Africa	41 – 0	Uganda
7 December 2007	Wales	12 – 24	Argentina
7 December 2007	Argentina	38 – 7	Uganda
7 December 2007	South Africa	31 – 0	Wales

=== Pool D ===
Team	Pld	W	D	L	PF	PA	+/-	Pts
Samoa	3	3	0	0	80	40	+40	9
Scotland	3	2	0	1	49	62	-13	7
Australia	3	0	1	2	41	53	-12	4
Tunisia	3	0	1	2	40	55	-15	4

Date	Team 1	Score	Team 2
7 December 2007	Samoa	38 – 7	Scotland
7 December 2007	Australia	12 – 12	Tunisia
7 December 2007	Samoa	22 – 14	Tunisia
7 December 2007	Australia	10 – 21	Scotland
7 December 2007	Scotland	21 – 14	Tunisia
7 December 2007	Samoa	20 – 19	Australia

== Knockout ==
=== Shield ===
Quarter-finals
8 December – Outeniqua Park, South Africa
England	35
Canada	5
8 December – Outeniqua Park, South Africa
Australia	34
Uganda	7
8 December – Outeniqua Park, South Africa
Wales	31
Tunisia	24
8 December – Outeniqua Park, South Africa
France	24
Zimbabwe	19

Semi-finals
8 December – Outeniqua Park, South Africa
Canada	31
Uganda	5
8 December – Outeniqua Park, South Africa
Tunisia	17
Zimbabwe	21

Final
8 December – Outeniqua Park, South Africa
Canada	31
Zimbabwe	14

=== Bowl ===
Quarter-finals
8 December – Outeniqua Park, South Africa
England	35
Canada	5
8 December – Outeniqua Park, South Africa
Australia	34
Uganda	7
8 December – Outeniqua Park, South Africa
Wales	31
Tunisia	24
8 December – Outeniqua Park, South Africa
France	24
Zimbabwe	19

Semi-finals
8 December – Outeniqua Park, South Africa
England	29
Australia	14
8 December – Outeniqua Park, South Africa
Wales	22
France	17

Final
8 December – Outeniqua Park, South Africa
England	19
Wales	21

=== Plate ===
Quarter-finals
8 December – Outeniqua Park, South Africa
New Zealand	36
United States	0
8 December – Outeniqua Park, South Africa
Samoa	19
Argentina	22
8 December – Outeniqua Park, South Africa
South Africa	21
Scotland	17
8 December – Outeniqua Park, South Africa
Fiji	24
Kenya	12

Semi-finals
8 December – Outeniqua Park, South Africa
United States	24
Samoa	19
8 December – Outeniqua Park, South Africa
Scotland	15
Kenya	17

Final
8 December – Outeniqua Park, South Africa
United States	14
Kenya	15

=== Cup ===
Quarter-finals
8 December – Outeniqua Park, South Africa
New Zealand	36
United States	0
8 December – Outeniqua Park, South Africa
Samoa	19
Argentina	22
8 December – Outeniqua Park, South Africa
South Africa	21
Scotland	17
8 December – Outeniqua Park, South Africa
Fiji	24
Kenya	12

Semi-finals
8 December – Outeniqua Park, South Africa
New Zealand	38
Argentina	14
8 December – Outeniqua Park, South Africa
South Africa	12
Fiji	21

Final
8 December – Outeniqua Park, South Africa
'New Zealand	34
Fiji	7

== Round 2 table ==
Pos.	Country	(Emirate of Dubai)	(South Africa)	(New Zealand)	(United States)	(Hong Kong)	(Australia)	(England)	(Scotland)	Overall
1	New Zealand	20	20							40
2	Fiji	16	16							32
3	South Africa	12	12							24
4	Argentina	8	12							20
5	England	12	0							12
5	Kenya	4	8							12
7	Samoa	6	4							10
8	Scotland	4	4							8
9	United States	0	6							6
10	Australia	2	0							2
10	Wales	0	2							2
12	France	0	0							0
12	Canada	0	0							0
12	Zimbabwe	0	0							0
12	Tunisia	0	0							0
12	Uganda	–	0							0
12	Arabian Gulf	0	–							0
