= 2005 Dubai Sevens =

- Sevens World Series VII
- Host nation: United Arab Emirates
- Date: 1–2 December 2005

Cup
- Champion: England
- Runner-up: Fiji

Plate
- Winner: New Zealand
- Runner-up: France

Bowl
- Winner: Wales
- Runner-up: Canada

Shield
- Winner: Kenya
- Runner-up: Tunisia

Tournament details
- Matches played: 45

The 2005 Dubai Sevens was an international rugby sevens tournament that took place at the Dubai Exiles Rugby Ground on 1 and 2 December 2005. It was the 18th edition of the Dubai Sevens (sixth as a World Series event) and was the first tournament of the 2005–06 World Sevens Series. Sixteen teams competed in the tournament and was separated into four groups of four with the top two teams from each group qualifying to the cup tournament.

After winning the group, South Africa took out the cup final defeating Fiji by a score of 28–26. New Zealand took out the plate while the bowl and shield was won by Wales and Kenya respectively.

== Teams ==
- Arabian Gulf
- Argentina
- Australia
- Canada
- England
- Fiji
- France
- Kenya
- New Zealand
- Portugal
- Samoa
- Scotland
- South Africa
- Tunisia
- Uganda
- Wales

== Pool stages ==
=== Pool A ===
| Team | Pld | W | D | L | PF | PA | +/- | Pts |
|---|---|---|---|---|---|---|---|---|
| New Zealand | 3 | 3 | 0 | 0 | 129 | 19 | 110 | 9 |
| France | 3 | 2 | 0 | 1 | 64 | 67 | -3 | 7 |
| Canada | 3 | 1 | 0 | 2 | 55 | 48 | 7 | 5 |
| Arabian Gulf | 3 | 0 | 0 | 3 | 17 | 131 | -114 | 3 |

| Date | Team 1 | Score | Team 2 |
| 2005-12-01 | New Zealand | 24 - 7 | Canada |
| 2005-12-01 | France | 33 - 12 | Arabian Gulf |
| 2005-12-01 | New Zealand | 60 - 0 | Arabian Gulf |
| 2005-12-01 | France | 19 - 10 | Canada |
| 2005-12-01 | Canada | 38 - 5 | Arabian Gulf |
| 2005-12-01 | New Zealand | 45 - 12 | France |

=== Pool B ===
| Team | Pld | W | D | L | PF | PA | +/- | Pts |
|---|---|---|---|---|---|---|---|---|
| Samoa | 3 | 3 | 0 | 0 | 66 | 26 | 40 | 9 |
| Fiji | 3 | 2 | 0 | 1 | 80 | 33 | 47 | 7 |
| Wales | 3 | 1 | 0 | 2 | 64 | 75 | -11 | 5 |
| Tunisia | 3 | 0 | 0 | 3 | 17 | 74 | -57 | 3 |

| Date | Team 1 | Score | Team 2 |
| 2005-12-01 | Fiji | 31 - 5 | Tunisia |
| 2005-12-01 | Samoa | 26 - 14 | Wales |
| 2005-12-01 | Fiji | 42 - 21 | Wales |
| 2005-12-01 | Samoa | 14 - 5 | Tunisia |
| 2005-12-01 | Tunisia | 7 - 29 | Wales |
| 2005-12-01 | Fiji | 7 - 26 | Samoa |

=== Pool C ===
| Team | Pld | W | D | L | PF | PA | +/- | Pts |
|---|---|---|---|---|---|---|---|---|
| England | 3 | 3 | 0 | 0 | 133 | 12 | 121 | 9 |
| Australia | 3 | 2 | 0 | 1 | 59 | 40 | 19 | 7 |
| Kenya | 3 | 1 | 0 | 2 | 54 | 78 | -24 | 5 |
| Uganda | 3 | 0 | 0 | 3 | 5 | 121 | -116 | 3 |

| Date | Team 1 | Score | Team 2 |
| 2005-12-01 | England | 52 - 7 | Kenya |
| 2005-12-01 | Australia | 33 - 0 | Uganda |
| 2005-12-01 | England | 48 - 0 | Uganda |
| 2005-12-01 | Australia | 21 - 7 | Kenya |
| 2005-12-01 | Kenya | 40 - 5 | Uganda |
| 2005-12-01 | England | 33 - 5 | Australia |

=== Pool D ===
| Team | Pld | W | D | L | PF | PA | +/- | Pts |
|---|---|---|---|---|---|---|---|---|
| South Africa | 3 | 3 | 0 | 0 | 80 | 21 | 59 | 9 |
| Argentina | 3 | 2 | 0 | 1 | 40 | 43 | -3 | 7 |
| Portugal | 3 | 1 | 0 | 2 | 38 | 64 | -26 | 5 |
| Scotland | 3 | 0 | 0 | 3 | 22 | 52 | -30 | 3 |

| Date | Team 1 | Score | Team 2 |
| 2005-12-01 | South Africa | 21 - 7 | Scotland |
| 2005-12-01 | Argentina | 19 - 14 | Portugal |
| 2005-12-01 | South Africa | 40 - 7 | Portugal |
| 2005-12-01 | Argentina | 14 - 10 | Scotland |
| 2005-12-01 | Scotland | 5 - 17 | Portugal |
| 2005-12-01 | South Africa | 19 - 7 | Argentina |

== Finals ==
=== Shield ===
Quarter-finals
December 2 - Dubai
Tunisia | 5
Canada | 26
December 2 - Dubai
Portugal | 41
Uganda | 0
December 2 - Dubai
Kenya | 0
Scotland | 33
December 2 - Dubai
Wales | 24
Arabian Gulf | 7

Semi-finals
December 2 - Dubai
Tunisia | 24
Uganda | 0
December 2 - Dubai
Kenya | 35
Arabian Gulf | 7

Final
December 2 - Dubai
Tunisia | 7
Kenya | 10

=== Bowl ===
Quarter-finals
December 2 - Dubai
Tunisia | 5
Canada | 26
December 2 - Dubai
Portugal | 41
Uganda | 0
December 2 - Dubai
Kenya | 0
Scotland | 33
December 2 - Dubai
Wales | 24
Arabian Gulf | 7

Semi-finals
December 2 - Dubai
Canada | 24
Portugal | 17
December 2 - Dubai
Scotland | 0
Wales | 19

Final
December 2 - Dubai
Canada | 5
Wales | 19

=== Plate ===
Quarter-finals
December 2 - Dubai
Fiji | 46
France | 7
December 2 - Dubai
New Zealand | 31
Argentina | 0
December 2 - Dubai
South Africa | 19
Samoa | 10
December 2 - Dubai
England | 21
Australia | 5

Semi-finals
December 2 - Dubai
France | 36
Argentina | 0
December 2 - Dubai
Samoa | 12
Australia | 5

Final
December 2 - Dubai
France | 7
Samoa | 26

=== Cup ===
Quarter-finals
December 2 - Dubai
Fiji | 46
France | 7
December 2 - Dubai
New Zealand | 31
Argentina | 0
December 2 - Dubai
South Africa | 19
Samoa | 10
December 2 - Dubai
England | 21
Australia | 5

Semi-finals
December 2 - Dubai
Fiji | 12
New Zealand | 17
December 2 - Dubai
South Africa | 19
England | 0

Final
December 2 - Dubai
New Zealand | 12
South Africa | 31
