= Rugby sevens at the 2001 World Games =

World Games 2001; Rugby Sevens
Host	(Japan) Akita
Dates	25–26 August 2001
Teams	8
Podium
Champions	Fiji
Runners-up	Australia
Third place	New Zealand
Fourth place	France

Rugby sevens at the World Games 2001 was played at Akita Yabase Stadium in Akita, Japan on 25–26 August 2001. Fiji won the final against Australia by the score of 35 to 19.

== Teams ==
8 Teams took part in this tournament:

- Australia
- Canada
- Fiji
- France
- Great Britain
- Japan
- New Zealand
- South Africa

== Pool phase ==
=== Pool A ===
Team	Pld	W	D	L	PF	PA	+/-	Pts
Fiji	3	3	0	0	108	19		9
France	3	2	0	1	69	50		7
New Zealand	3	1	0	2	40	49		5
Canada	3	0	0	3	12	111		3

25 August 2001
10:00

New Zealand	21 – 17	Canada

Akita Yabase Stadium

25 August 2001
10:25

Fiji	33 – 12	France

Akita Yabase Stadium

25 August 2001
12:10

France	21 – 12	New Zealand

Akita Yabase Stadium

25 August 2001
12:35

Fiji	54 – 0	Canada

Akita Yabase Stadium

25 August 2001
14:05

France	36 – 5	Canada

Akita Yabase Stadium

25 August 2001
14:30

Fiji	21 – 7	New Zealand

Akita Yabase Stadium

=== Pool B ===
Team	Pld	W	D	L	PF	PA	+/-	Pts
Australia	3	3	0	0	85	19		9
South Africa	3	2	0	1	95	33		7
Japan	3	1	0	2	45	73		5
Great Britain	3	0	0	3	12	112		3

25 August 2001
10:50

Australia	31 – 0	Great Britain

Akita Yabase Stadium

25 August 2001
11:25

South Africa	33 – 7	Japan

Akita Yabase Stadium

25 August 2001
13:00

Australia	33 – 0	Japan

Akita Yabase Stadium

25 August 2001
13:25

South Africa	43 – 5	Great Britain

Akita Yabase Stadium

25 August 2001
14:55

Japan	38 – 7	Great Britain

Akita Yabase Stadium

25 August 2001
15:20

Australia	21 – 19	South Africa

Akita Yabase Stadium

== Knock-out phase ==
=== Finals ===
Quarter-finals
25 August 2001 – 10:00 – Akita Yabase Stadium
Fiji	35
Great Britain	0
25 August 2001 – 10:25 – Akita Yabase Stadium
New Zealand	15
South Africa	12
25 August 2001 – 10:50 – Akita Yabase Stadium
Australia	49
Canada	0
25 August 2001 – 11:25 – Akita Yabase Stadium
France	40
Japan	0

Semi-finals
25 August 2001 – 13:00 – Akita Yabase Stadium
Fiji	45
New Zealand	0
25 August 2001 – 13:25 – Akita Yabase Stadium
Australia	35
France	5

Final
25 August 2001 – 15:25 – Akita Yabase Stadium
Fiji	35
Australia	19
Third place
25 August 2001 – 14:55 – Akita Yabase Stadium
New Zealand	19
France	10

=== Classification matches ===
Lower bracket play-offs
25 August 2001 – 12:10 – Akita Yabase Stadium
South Africa	22
Great Britain	19
25 August 2001 – 12:35 – Akita Yabase Stadium
Canada	21
Japan	19

5th place play-off
25 August 2001 – 14:30 – Akita Yabase Stadium
South Africa	34
Canada	5
7th place play-off
25 August 2001 – 14:05 – Akita Yabase Stadium
Great Britain	21
Japan	19
