= 2004 USA Sevens =

Rugby tournament

- 2003–04 Sevens World Series
- Host nation: United States

Cup
- Champion: Argentina
- Runner-up: New Zealand

Plate
- Winner: England

Tournament details
- Matches played: 45

The 2004 USA Sevens was the first time that the USA Sevens rugby tournament was played. It was held at the Home Depot Center in the Los Angeles suburb of Carson. Argentina defeated New Zealand 21–12 in the cup final to win the tournament. It was Argentina's first victory in a World Series tournament since its inception five years before.

== Format ==
The teams were drawn into four pools of four teams each, with each team playing every other team in their pool once. The top two teams from each pool advanced to the Cup/Plate brackets. The bottom two teams from each group went to the Bowl/Shield brackets.

== Pool Stage ==
Key to colours in group tables
| Teams that advanced to the Cup Quarterfinal |

=== Pool A ===
| Team | Pld | W | D | L | PF | PA | PD | Pts |
|---|---|---|---|---|---|---|---|---|
| Samoa | 3 | 3 | 0 | 0 | 88 | 17 | +71 | 9 |
| England | 3 | 2 | 0 | 1 | 122 | 19 | +103 | 7 |
| United States | 3 | 1 | 0 | 2 | 31 | 84 | –53 | 5 |
| Trinidad and Tobago | 3 | 0 | 0 | 3 | 12 | 133 | –121 | 3 |

14 February 2004

| England | 55–0 | United States |

Home Depot Center

14 February 2004

| Trinidad and Tobago | 0–52 | Samoa |

Home Depot Center

14 February 2004

| England | 50–0 | Trinidad and Tobago |

Home Depot Center

14 February 2004

| Samoa | 17–0 | United States |

Home Depot Center

14 February 2004

| Trinidad and Tobago | 12–31 | United States |

Home Depot Center

14 February 2004

| England | 17–19 | Samoa |

Home Depot Center

=== Pool B ===
| Team | Pld | W | D | L | PF | PA | PD | Pts |
|---|---|---|---|---|---|---|---|---|
| New Zealand | 3 | 3 | 0 | 0 | 80 | 38 | +42 | 9 |
| Canada | 3 | 2 | 0 | 1 | 62 | 58 | +4 | 7 |
| Tonga | 3 | 1 | 0 | 2 | 47 | 53 | –6 | 5 |
| Australia | 3 | 0 | 0 | 3 | 36 | 76 | –40 | 3 |

14 February 2004

| New Zealand | 34–12 | Canada |

Home Depot Center

14 February 2004

| Tonga | 21–12 | Australia |

Home Depot Center

14 February 2004

| New Zealand | 17–14 | Tonga |

Home Depot Center

14 February 2004

| Canada | 26–12 | Australia |

Home Depot Center

14 February 2004

| Canada | 24–12 | Tonga |

Home Depot Center

14 February 2004

| New Zealand | 29–12 | Australia |

Home Depot Center

=== Pool C ===
| Team | Pld | W | D | L | PF | PA | PD | Pts |
|---|---|---|---|---|---|---|---|---|
| South Africa | 3 | 3 | 0 | 0 | 115 | 7 | +108 | 9 |
| France | 3 | 1 | 1 | 1 | 36 | 45 | –9 | 6 |
| South Korea | 3 | 1 | 1 | 1 | 50 | 61 | –11 | 6 |
| Uruguay | 3 | 0 | 0 | 3 | 26 | 114 | –88 | 3 |

14 February 2004

| South Africa | 35–0 | South Korea |

Home Depot Center

14 February 2004

| France | 17–12 | Uruguay |

Home Depot Center

14 February 2004

| South Africa | 59–0 | Uruguay |

Home Depot Center

14 February 2004

| France | 12–12 | South Korea |

Home Depot Center

14 February 2004

| South Korea | 38–14 | Uruguay |

Home Depot Center

14 February 2004

| South Africa | 21–7 | France |

Home Depot Center

=== Pool D ===
| Team | Pld | W | D | L | PF | PA | PD | Pts |
|---|---|---|---|---|---|---|---|---|
| Argentina | 3 | 3 | 0 | 0 | 83 | 15 | +68 | 9 |
| Fiji | 3 | 2 | 0 | 1 | 83 | 47 | +36 | 7 |
| Chile | 3 | 1 | 0 | 2 | 36 | 93 | –57 | 5 |
| Kenya | 3 | 0 | 0 | 3 | 24 | 71 | –47 | 3 |

14 February 2004

| Fiji | 33–7 | Kenya |

Home Depot Center

14 February 2004

| Argentina | 31–10 | Chile |

Home Depot Center

14 February 2004

| Fiji | 45–7 | Chile |

Home Depot Center

14 February 2004

| Argentina | 19–0 | Kenya |

Home Depot Center

14 February 2004

| Chile | 19–17 | Kenya |

Home Depot Center

14 February 2004

| Argentina | 33–5 | Fiji |

Home Depot Center

== Knockout rounds ==
=== Cup ===
Quarter-finals
15 February 2004 – Home Depot Center
South Africa | 14
Fiji | 22
15 February 2004 – Home Depot Center
New Zealand | 22
England | 0
15 February 2004 – Home Depot Center
Samoa | 15
Canada | 10
15 February 2004 – Home Depot Center
Argentina | 17
France | 0

Semi-finals
15 February 2004 – Home Depot Center
Fiji | 12
New Zealand | 15
15 February 2004 – Home Depot Center
Samoa | 12
Argentina | 17

Cup Final
15 February 2004 – Home Depot Center
New Zealand | 12
Argentina | 21

=== Plate ===
Semi-finals
15 February 2004 – Home Depot Center
Canada | 17
France | 7
15 February 2004 – Home Depot Center
South Africa | 7
England | 33

5th Place Final
15 February 2004 – Home Depot Center
Canada | 0
England | 55

=== Bowl ===
Quarter-finals
15 February 2004 – Home Depot Center
United States | 17
Australia | 26
15 February 2004 – Home Depot Center
Chile | 21
Uruguay | 19
15 February 2004 – Home Depot Center
South Korea | 12
Kenya | 14
15 February 2004 – Home Depot Center
Tonga | 36
Trinidad and Tobago | 0

Semi-finals
15 February 2004 – Home Depot Center
Australia | 42
Chile | 0
15 February 2004 – Home Depot Center
Kenya | 27
Tonga | 7

Cup Final
15 February 2004 – Home Depot Center
Australia | 33
Kenya | 31

=== Shield ===
Semi-finals
15 February 2004 – Home Depot Center
United States | 21
Uruguay | 12
15 February 2004 – Home Depot Center
South Korea | 35
Trinidad and Tobago | 0

5th Place Final
15 February 2004 – Home Depot Center
United States | 29
South Korea | 22
