= 2008 USA Sevens =

- 2007–08 Sevens World Series
- Host nation: United States

Cup
- Champion: New Zealand
- Runner-up: South Africa

Plate
- Winner: Fiji

Tournament details
- Matches played: 45

The 2008 USA Sevens competition took place on February 9 and 10 at Petco Park in San Diego, California. It was the fourth Cup trophy in the 2007-08 IRB Sevens World Series. The USA Sevens is played annually as part of the IRB Sevens World Series for international rugby sevens.

The top-level Cup competition was won by New Zealand, who became the first team in the history of the IRB Sevens to win the first four tournaments of a season; it was also the Kiwis' sixth consecutive tournament win overall. In the Cup semifinal against Kenya, they made history with their 35th consecutive match win in the IRB Sevens, breaking their own record set in 2001/02. They took the record to 36 with their final win over South Africa.

The second-level Plate was won by Fiji in a sudden-death extra time thriller against Argentina. In the Bowl final, Wales beat the hosts in another thriller, in which the USA scored a try after the final horn, but missed the conversion that would have sent the match to extra time. The remaining trophy, the Shield, went to Australia.

The New Zealand brewery Steinlager was the presenting sponsor for this tournament.

== Pool stages ==
=== Pool A ===
Team	Pld	W	D	L	PF	PA	+/-	Pts
New Zealand	3	3	0	0	85	0	+85	9
Scotland	3	1	0	2	31	53	−22	5
France	3	1	0	2	38	65	−27	5
Wales	3	1	0	2	21	57	−36	5

Date	Team 1	Score	Team 2
February 9, 2008	New Zealand	19 – 0	Wales
February 9, 2008	Scotland	19 – 12	France
February 9, 2008	New Zealand	39 – 0	France
February 9, 2008	Scotland	12 – 14	Wales
February 9, 2008	Wales	7 – 26	France
February 9, 2008	New Zealand	27 – 0	Scotland

=== Pool B ===
Team	Pld	W	D	L	PF	PA	+/-	Pts
Samoa	3	3	0	0	69	29	+40	9
Fiji	3	2	0	1	109	35	+74	7
Australia	3	1	0	2	59	46	+13	5
West Indies	3	0	0	3	17	144	−127	3

Date	Team 1	Score	Team 2
February 9, 2008	Fiji	26 – 7	Australia
February 9, 2008	Samoa	33 – 5	West Indies
February 9, 2008	Fiji	66 – 7	West Indies
February 9, 2008	Samoa	15 – 7	Australia
February 9, 2008	Australia	45 – 5	West Indies
February 9, 2008	Fiji	17 – 21	Samoa

=== Pool C ===
Team	Pld	W	D	L	PF	PA	+/-	Pts
Argentina	3	3	0	0	76	31	+45	9
Kenya	3	2	0	1	69	26	+43	7
Canada	3	1	0	2	66	48	+18	5
Chile	3	0	0	3	7	113	−106	3

Date	Team 1	Score	Team 2
February 9, 2008	Argentina	22 – 19	Canada
February 9, 2008	Kenya	38 – 0	Chile
February 9, 2008	Argentina	35 – 0	Chile
February 9, 2008	Kenya	19 – 7	Canada
February 9, 2008	Canada	40 – 7	Chile
February 9, 2008	Argentina	19 – 12	Kenya

=== Pool D ===
Team	Pld	W	D	L	PF	PA	+/-	Pts
England	3	3	0	0	90	31	+59	9
South Africa	3	2	0	1	99	14	+85	7
United States	3	1	0	2	73	64	+9	5
Mexico	3	0	0	3	0	153	−153	3

Date	Team 1	Score	Team 2
February 9, 2008	South Africa	36 – 0	United States
February 9, 2008	England	48 – 0	Mexico
February 9, 2008	South Africa	53 – 0	Mexico
February 9, 2008	England	28 – 21	United States
February 9, 2008	United States	52 – 0	Mexico
February 9, 2008	South Africa	10 – 14	England

== Knockout ==
=== Shield ===
Quarter-finals
February 10 – San Diego, USA
France	26
West Indies	5
February 10 – San Diego, USA
United States	40
Chile	12
February 10 – San Diego, USA
Canada	45
Mexico	0
February 10 – San Diego, USA
Australia	12
Wales	19

Semi-finals
February 10 – San Diego, USA
West Indies	17
Chile	19
February 10 – San Diego, USA
Mexico	0
Australia	63

Final
February 10 – San Diego, USA
Chile	12
Australia	24

=== Bowl ===
Quarter-finals
February 10 – San Diego, USA
France	26
West Indies	5
February 10 – San Diego, USA
United States	40
Chile	12
February 10 – San Diego, USA
Canada	45
Mexico	0
February 10 – San Diego, USA
Australia	12
Wales	19

Semi-finals
February 10 – San Diego, USA
France	10
United States	12
February 10 – San Diego, USA
Canada	14
Wales	22

Final
February 10 – San Diego, USA
United States	19
Wales	21

=== Plate ===
Quarter-finals
February 10 – San Diego, USA
New Zealand	28
Fiji	5
February 10 – San Diego, USA
England	7
Kenya	17
February 10 – San Diego, USA
Argentina	0
South Africa	24
February 10 – San Diego, USA
Samoa	24
Scotland	12

Semi-finals
February 10 – San Diego, USA
Fiji	21
England	14
February 10 – San Diego, USA
Argentina	22
Scotland	14

Final
February 10 – San Diego, USA
Fiji	26
Argentina	21

=== Cup ===
Quarter-finals
February 10 – San Diego, USA
New Zealand	28
Fiji	5
February 10 – San Diego, USA
England	7
Kenya	17
February 10 – San Diego, USA
Argentina	0
South Africa	24
February 10 – San Diego, USA
Samoa	24
Scotland	12

Semi-finals
February 10 – San Diego, USA
New Zealand	50
Kenya	10
February 10 – San Diego, USA
South Africa	22
Samoa	12

Final
February 10 – San Diego, USA
New Zealand	27
South Africa	12
