= 2013 USA Sevens =

- Host nation: United States
- Date: 8–10 February 2013

Cup
- Champion: South Africa
- Runner-up: New Zealand
- Third: Samoa

Plate
- Winner: Canada
- Runner-up: Scotland

Bowl
- Winner: France
- Runner-up: Argentina

Shield
- Winner: Australia
- Runner-up: Uruguay

Tournament details
- Matches played: 45
- Tries scored: 223 (average 4.96 per match)
- Most points: (Australia) Lewis Holland (52 points)
- Most tries: (Australia) Lewis Holland (8 tries)

The 2013 USA Sevens was the tenth edition of the USA Sevens tournament, and the fifth tournament of the 2012–13 IRB Sevens World Series. The host stadium was the Sam Boyd Stadium in the Las Vegas-area community of Whitney, Nevada.

South Africa won the title by defeating New Zealand 40–21 in the final.

== Format ==
The teams were divided into pools of four teams, who played a round-robin within the pool. Points were awarded in each pool on a different schedule from most rugby tournaments—3 for a win, 2 for a draw, 1 for a loss. The top two teams in each pool advanced to the Cup competition. The four quarterfinal losers dropped into the bracket for the Plate. The Bowl was contested by the third- and fourth-place finishers in each pool, with the losers in the Bowl quarterfinals dropping into the bracket for the Shield.

== Teams ==
The participating teams were:

- Argentina
- Australia
- Canada
- England
- Fiji
- France
- Kenya
- New Zealand
- Portugal
- Samoa
- Scotland
- South Africa
- Spain
- United States
- Uruguay
- Wales

== Pool stage ==
The draw was made on February 2.

Key to colours in group tables
Teams that advanced to the Cup Quarterfinal

=== Pool A ===
Teams	Pld	W	D	L	PF	PA	+/−	Pts
Fiji	3	3	0	0	61	43	+18	9
Scotland	3	2	0	1	38	24	+14	7
Portugal	3	1	0	2	45	38	+7	5
England	3	0	0	3	22	61	−39	3

8 February 2013
16:00

England	17 – 26	Fiji
	Report^{[usurped]}

Sam Boyd Stadium, Whitney, Nevada

8 February 2013
16:22

Scotland	12 – 10	Portugal

Sam Boyd Stadium, Whitney, Nevada

8 February 2013
18:56

England	5 – 21	Portugal

Sam Boyd Stadium, Whitney, Nevada

8 February 2013
19:18

Scotland	12 – 14	Fiji

Sam Boyd Stadium, Whitney, Nevada

9 February 2013
12:00

Fiji	21 – 14	Portugal
	Report^{[usurped]}

Sam Boyd Stadium, Whitney, Nevada

9 February 2013
13:28

England	0 – 14	Scotland
	Report^{[usurped]}

Sam Boyd Stadium, Whitney, Nevada

=== Pool B ===
Teams	Pld	W	D	L	PF	PA	+/−	Pts
South Africa	3	3	0	0	77	10	+67	9
Canada	3	2	0	1	60	29	+31	7
Kenya	3	1	0	2	29	41	−12	5
Uruguay	3	0	0	3	7	93	−86	3

8 February 2013
16:44

Kenya	12 – 19	Canada

Sam Boyd Stadium, Whitney, Nevada

8 February 2013
17:06

South Africa	45 – 0	Uruguay

Sam Boyd Stadium, Whitney, Nevada

8 February 2013
19:40

Kenya	12 – 7	Uruguay
	Report^{[usurped]}

Sam Boyd Stadium, Whitney, Nevada

8 February 2013
20:02

South Africa	17 – 5	Canada
	Report^{[usurped]}

Sam Boyd Stadium, Whitney, Nevada

9 February 2013
12:22

Canada	36 – 0	Uruguay

Sam Boyd Stadium, Whitney, Nevada

9 February 2013
13:50

Kenya	5 – 15	South Africa
	Report^{[usurped]}

Sam Boyd Stadium, Whitney, Nevada

=== Pool C ===
Teams	Pld	W	D	L	PF	PA	+/−	Pts
New Zealand	3	3	0	0	78	10	+68	9
Wales	3	2	0	1	39	61	−22	7
Argentina	3	1	0	2	26	46	−20	5
France	3	0	0	3	26	52	−26	3

8 February 2013
17:28

New Zealand	21 – 0	France
	Report^{[usurped]}

Sam Boyd Stadium, Whitney, Nevada

8 February 2013
17:50

Argentina	7 – 17	Wales

Sam Boyd Stadium, Whitney, Nevada

8 February 2013
20:24

New Zealand	40 – 5	Wales
	Report^{[usurped]}

Sam Boyd Stadium, Whitney, Nevada

8 February 2013
20:46

Argentina	14 – 12	France

Sam Boyd Stadium, Whitney, Nevada

9 February 2013
12:44

France	14 – 17	Wales

Sam Boyd Stadium, Whitney, Nevada

9 February 2013
14:12

New Zealand	17 – 5	Argentina
	Report^{[usurped]}

Sam Boyd Stadium, Whitney, Nevada

=== Pool D ===
Teams	Pld	W	D	L	PF	PA	+/−	Pts
Samoa	3	3	0	0	59	26	+33	9
United States	3	1	0	2	36	45	−9	5
Australia	3	1	0	2	47	59	−12	5
Spain	3	1	0	2	43	55	−12	5

8 February 2013
18:12

Samoa	19 – 12	Spain

Sam Boyd Stadium, Whitney, Nevada

8 February 2013
18:34

Australia	26 – 7	United States

Sam Boyd Stadium, Whitney, Nevada

8 February 2013
21:08

Australia	14 – 24	Spain

Sam Boyd Stadium, Whitney, Nevada

8 February 2013
21:30

Samoa	12 – 7	United States

Sam Boyd Stadium, Whitney, Nevada

9 February 2013
13:06

Australia	7 – 28	Samoa

Sam Boyd Stadium, Whitney, Nevada

9 February 2013
14:34

Spain	7 – 22	United States
	Report^{[usurped]}

Sam Boyd Stadium, Whitney, Nevada

== Knockout stage ==
=== Shield ===
Quarter-finals
9 February – 16:24 – Whitney
Portugal	0
Spain	12
9 February – 16:46 – Whitney
Argentina	24
Uruguay	0
9 February – 17:08 – Whitney
Australia	21
England	26
9 February – 17:30 – Whitney
Kenya	17
France	21

Semi-finals
10 February – 09:20 – Whitney
Portugal	5
Uruguay	7
10 February – 09:42 – Whitney
Australia	38
Kenya	7

Final
10 February – 12:45 – Whitney
Uruguay	0
Australia	41

=== Bowl ===
Quarter-finals
9 February – 16:24 – Whitney
Portugal	0
Spain	12
9 February – 16:46 – Whitney
Argentina	24
Uruguay	0
9 February – 17:08 – Whitney
Australia	21
England	26
9 February – 17:30 – Whitney
Kenya	17
France	21

Semi-finals
10 February – 10:04 – Whitney
Spain	12
Argentina	21
10 February – 10:26 – Whitney
England	7
France	40

Final
10 February – 13:10 – Whitney
Argentina	12
France	17

=== Plate ===
Quarter-finals
9 February – 17:52 – Whitney
Fiji	21
United States	19
9 February – 18:14 – Whitney
New Zealand	17
Canada	0
9 February – 18:36 – Whitney
Samoa	12
Scotland	5
9 February – 18:58 – Whitney
South Africa	26
Wales	0

Semi-finals
10 February – 10:48 – Whitney
United States	19
Canada	24
10 February – 11:10 – Whitney
Scotland	35
Wales	14

Final
10 February – 13:35 – Whitney
Canada	22
Scotland	5

=== Cup ===
Quarter-finals
9 February – 17:52 – Whitney
Fiji	21
United States	19
9 February – 18:14 – Whitney
New Zealand	17
Canada	0
9 February – 18:36 – Whitney
Samoa	12
Scotland	5
9 February – 18:58 – Whitney
South Africa	26
Wales	0

Semi-finals
10 February – 11:32 – Whitney
Fiji	14
New Zealand	19
10 February – 11:54 – Whitney
Samoa	7
South Africa	12

Final
10 February – 14:25 – Whitney
New Zealand	21
South Africa	40
Third place
10 February – 14:00 – Whitney
Fiji	31
Samoa	36
