= 2005 USA Sevens =

Rugby tournament

- 2004–05 Sevens World Series
- Host nation: United States
- Date: February 12–13, 2005

Cup
- Champion: New Zealand
- Runner-up: Argentina
- Third: Australia

Plate
- Winner: Fiji

Bowl
- Winner: Canada

Shield
- Winner: Tonga

Tournament details
- Matches played: 45
- Most points: (New Zealand) Orene Ai'i (61)
- Most tries: (New Zealand) Tafai Ioasa (8)

The 2005 USA Sevens was the second time that the USA Sevens rugby tournament was played. New Zealand defeated Argentina 34–5 in the final placing them atop the overall series standings. This victory clinched New Zealand's third consecutive IRB Sevens tour title following victories in New Zealand and South Africa.

== Format ==
The teams were drawn into four pools of four teams each, with each team playing every other team in their pool once. The top two teams from each pool advanced to the Cup/Plate brackets. The bottom two teams from each group went to the Bowl/Shield brackets.

== Pool stage ==
Key to colours in group tables
Teams that advanced to the Cup Quarterfinal

=== Pool A ===
Team	Pld	W	D	L	PF	PA	PD	Pts
England	3	3	0	0	85	29	+56	9
Fiji	3	1	1	1	79	31	+48	6
Tonga	3	1	1	1	55	51	+4	6
West Indies	3	0	0	3	22	130	–108	3

12 February 2005

England	14–10	Fiji

Home Depot Center

12 February 2005

Tonga	26–15	West Indies

Home Depot Center

12 February 2005

Fiji	17–17	Tonga

Home Depot Center

12 February 2005

England	52–7	West Indies

Home Depot Center

12 February 2005

Fiji	52–0	West Indies

Home Depot Center

12 February 2005

England	19–12	Tonga

Home Depot Center

=== Pool B ===
Team	Pld	W	D	L	PF	PA	PD	Pts
New Zealand	3	3	0	0	100	5	+95	9
Samoa	3	2	0	1	55	48	+7	7
Scotland	3	1	0	2	34	70	–36	5
Uruguay	3	0	0	3	27	93	–66	3

12 February 2005

New Zealand	26–0	Samoa

Home Depot Center

12 February 2005

Scotland	24–10	Uruguay

Home Depot Center

12 February 2005

Samoa	17–10	Scotland

Home Depot Center

12 February 2005

New Zealand	31–5	Uruguay

Home Depot Center

12 February 2005

Samoa	38–12	Uruguay

Home Depot Center

12 February 2005

New Zealand	43–0	Scotland

Home Depot Center

=== Pool C ===
Team	Pld	W	D	L	PF	PA	PD	Pts
Australia	3	3	0	0	64	15	+49	9
South Africa	3	2	0	1	64	47	+17	7
Canada	3	1	0	2	43	47	–4	5
United States	3	0	0	3	24	86	–62	3

12 February 2005

Australia	26–0	South Africa

Home Depot Center

12 February 2005

Canada	19–12	United States

Home Depot Center

12 February 2005

Australia	14–10	Canada

Home Depot Center

12 February 2005

South Africa	43–7	United States

Home Depot Center

12 February 2005

Australia	24–5	United States

Home Depot Center

12 February 2005

South Africa	21–14	Canada

Home Depot Center

=== Pool D ===
Team	Pld	W	D	L	PF	PA	PD	Pts
Argentina	3	3	0	0	100	5	+95	9
France	3	2	0	1	86	34	+52	7
Kenya	3	1	0	2	39	48	–9	5
Mexico	3	0	0	3	0	138	–138	3

12 February 2005

Argentina	22–5	France

Home Depot Center

12 February 2005

Kenya	27–0	Mexico

Home Depot Center

12 February 2005

France	29–12	Kenya

Home Depot Center

12 February 2005

Argentina	59–0	Mexico

Home Depot Center

12 February 2005

France	52–0	Mexico

Home Depot Center

12 February 2005

Argentina	19–0	Kenya

Home Depot Center

== Knockout rounds ==
=== Cup ===
Quarter-finals
13 February 2005 – Home Depot Center
New Zealand	21
Fiji	7
13 February 2005 – Home Depot Center
Australia	24
France	0
13 February 2005 – Home Depot Center
Argentina	7
South Africa	5
13 February 2005 – Home Depot Center
England	28
Samoa	7

Semi-finals
13 February 2005 – Home Depot Center
New Zealand	31
Australia	12
13 February 2005 – Home Depot Center
England	0
Argentina	17

Cup Final
13 February 2005 – Home Depot Center
New Zealand	34
Argentina	5
Bronze Medal Match

13 February 2005

New Zealand	31–12	Australia
	Report

Home Depot Center

13 February 2005

England	0–17	Argentina
	Report

Home Depot Center

13 February 2005

New Zealand	34–5	Argentina
	Report

Home Depot Center

=== Plate ===
Semi-finals
13 February 2005 – Home Depot Center
Fiji	28
France	10
13 February 2005 – Home Depot Center
Samoa	12
South Africa	10

5th Place Final
13 February 2005 – Home Depot Center
Fiji	24
Samoa	21

=== Bowl ===
Quarter-finals
13 February 2005 – Home Depot Center
Canada	49
Mexico	0
13 February 2005 – Home Depot Center
Scotland	33
West Indies	7
13 February 2005 – Home Depot Center
Kenya	14
United States	0
13 February 2005 – Home Depot Center
Uruguay	17
Tonga	10

Semi-finals
13 February 2005 – Home Depot Center
Canada	17
Scotland	10
13 February 2005 – Home Depot Center
Kenya	26
Uruguay	10

Cup Final
13 February 2005 – Home Depot Center
Canada	15
Kenya	0
Bronze Medal Match

=== Shield ===
Semi-finals
13 February 2005 – Home Depot Center
Tonga	35
United States	12
13 February 2005 – Home Depot Center
Mexico	19
West Indies	12

5th Place Final
13 February 2005 – Home Depot Center
Tonga	40
Mexico	0
