= 2012 South Africa Sevens =

- Host nation: South Africa
- Date: 8–9 December 2012

Cup
- Champion: New Zealand
- Runner-up: France
- Third: South Africa

Plate
- Winner: Wales
- Runner-up: Fiji

Bowl
- Winner: Australia
- Runner-up: Samoa

Shield
- Winner: Spain
- Runner-up: Zimbabwe

Tournament details
- Matches played: 45
- Tries scored: 235 (average 5.22 per match)
- Most points: (New Zealand) Kurt Baker (40 points)
- Most tries: (New Zealand) Kurt Baker (8 tries)

The 2012 South Africa Sevens was the ninth edition of the tournament and the third tournament of the 2012–13 IRB Sevens World Series.

New Zealand defeated France 47–12 in the final. Because of this, they (that is, New Zealand) won the title of champion of the 2012 South Africa Sevens.

== Format ==
The teams were divided into pools of four teams, who played a round-robin within the pool. Points were awarded in each pool on a different schedule from most rugby tournaments—3 for a win, 2 for a draw, 1 for a loss. The top two teams in each pool advanced to the Cup competition. The four quarterfinal losers dropped into the bracket for the Plate. The Bowl was contested by the third- and fourth-place finishers in each pool, with the losers in the Bowl quarterfinals dropping into the bracket for the Shield.

== Teams ==
The participating teams are:

- Argentina
- Australia
- Canada
- England
- Fiji
- France
- Kenya
- New Zealand
- Portugal
- Samoa
- Scotland
- South Africa
- Spain
- United States
- Wales
- Zimbabwe

== Pool stage ==
The draw was made on 2 December.

Key to colours in group tables
| Teams that advance to the Cup Quarterfinal |

=== Pool A ===
| Teams | Pld | W | D | L | PF | PA | +/− | Pts |
|---|---|---|---|---|---|---|---|---|
| South Africa | 3 | 3 | 0 | 0 | 58 | 19 | +39 | 9 |
| France | 3 | 1 | 0 | 2 | 43 | 29 | +14 | 5 |
| Australia | 3 | 1 | 0 | 2 | 38 | 55 | −17 | 5 |
| Samoa | 3 | 1 | 0 | 2 | 26 | 62 | −36 | 5 |

8 December 2012
13:12

| Samoa | 7 – 29 | South Africa |

Nelson Mandela Bay Stadium, Port Elizabeth

8 December 2012
13:34

| France | 31 – 5 | Australia |
| | Report |

Nelson Mandela Bay Stadium, Port Elizabeth

8 December 2012
16:18

| Samoa | 7 – 26 | Australia |

Nelson Mandela Bay Stadium, Port Elizabeth

8 December 2012
16:40

| France | 5 – 12 | South Africa |

Nelson Mandela Bay Stadium, Port Elizabeth

8 December 2012
19:36

| South Africa | 17 – 7 | Australia |

Nelson Mandela Bay Stadium, Port Elizabeth

8 December 2012
19:58

| Samoa | 12 – 7 | France |
| | Report |

Nelson Mandela Bay Stadium, Port Elizabeth

=== Pool B ===
| Teams | Pld | W | D | L | PF | PA | +/− | Pts |
|---|---|---|---|---|---|---|---|---|
| Fiji | 3 | 2 | 0 | 1 | 72 | 52 | +20 | 7 |
| New Zealand | 3 | 2 | 0 | 1 | 50 | 38 | +12 | 7 |
| England | 3 | 1 | 0 | 2 | 59 | 65 | −6 | 5 |
| Scotland | 3 | 1 | 0 | 2 | 40 | 66 | −26 | 5 |

8 December 2012
11:00

| New Zealand | 14 – 7 | Scotland |
| | Report |

Nelson Mandela Bay Stadium, Port Elizabeth

8 December 2012
11:22

| Fiji | 29 – 19 | England |

Nelson Mandela Bay Stadium, Port Elizabeth

8 December 2012
14:06

| New Zealand | 24 – 7 | England |
| | Report |

Nelson Mandela Bay Stadium, Port Elizabeth

8 December 2012
14:28

| Fiji | 19 – 21 | Scotland |

Nelson Mandela Bay Stadium, Port Elizabeth

8 December 2012
17:14

| Scotland | 12 – 33 | England |

Nelson Mandela Bay Stadium, Port Elizabeth

8 December 2012
18:52

| New Zealand | 12 – 24 | Fiji |
| | Report |

Nelson Mandela Bay Stadium, Port Elizabeth

=== Pool C ===
| Teams | Pld | W | D | L | PF | PA | +/− | Pts |
|---|---|---|---|---|---|---|---|---|
| Wales | 3 | 2 | 0 | 1 | 52 | 31 | +21 | 7 |
| Argentina | 3 | 2 | 0 | 1 | 50 | 42 | +8 | 7 |
| Kenya | 3 | 2 | 0 | 1 | 61 | 64 | −3 | 7 |
| Spain | 3 | 0 | 0 | 3 | 33 | 59 | −26 | 3 |

8 December 2012
11:44

| Kenya | 21 – 17 | Argentina |
| | Report |

Nelson Mandela Bay Stadium, Port Elizabeth

8 December 2012
12:06

| Wales | 12 – 5 | Spain |

Nelson Mandela Bay Stadium, Port Elizabeth

8 December 2012
14:50

| Kenya | 26 – 14 | Spain |
| | Report |

Nelson Mandela Bay Stadium, Port Elizabeth

8 December 2012
15:12

| Wales | 7 – 12 | Argentina |
| | Report |

Nelson Mandela Bay Stadium, Port Elizabeth

8 December 2012
17:36

| Argentina | 21 – 14 | Spain |
| | Report |

Nelson Mandela Bay Stadium, Port Elizabeth

8 December 2012
19:14

| Kenya | 14 – 33 | Wales |
| | Report |

Nelson Mandela Bay Stadium, Port Elizabeth

=== Pool D ===
| Teams | Pld | W | D | L | PF | PA | +/− | Pts |
|---|---|---|---|---|---|---|---|---|
| Portugal | 3 | 3 | 0 | 0 | 71 | 31 | +40 | 9 |
| United States | 3 | 2 | 0 | 1 | 59 | 55 | +4 | 7 |
| Canada | 3 | 1 | 0 | 2 | 45 | 54 | -9 | 5 |
| Zimbabwe | 3 | 0 | 0 | 3 | 29 | 64 | −35 | 3 |

8 December 2012
12:28

| Portugal | 26 – 12 | United States |
| | Report |

Nelson Mandela Bay Stadium, Port Elizabeth

8 December 2012
12:50

| Canada | 26 – 0 | Zimbabwe |

Nelson Mandela Bay Stadium, Port Elizabeth

8 December 2012
15:34

| Portugal | 17 – 12 | Zimbabwe |

Nelson Mandela Bay Stadium, Port Elizabeth

8 December 2012
15:56

| Canada | 12 – 26 | United States |
| | Report |

Nelson Mandela Bay Stadium, Port Elizabeth

8 December 2012
17:58

| United States | 21 – 17 | Zimbabwe |
| | Report |

Nelson Mandela Bay Stadium, Port Elizabeth

8 December 2012
18:20

| Portugal | 28 – 7 | Canada |

Nelson Mandela Bay Stadium, Port Elizabeth

== Knockout stage ==
=== Shield ===
Quarter-finals
9 December – Port Elizabeth
Australia | 24
Zimbabwe | 14
9 December – Port Elizabeth
Kenya | 19
Scotland | 17
9 December – Port Elizabeth
Canada | 21
Samoa | 36
9 December – Port Elizabeth
England | 14
Spain | 7

Semi-finals
9 December – Port Elizabeth
Zimbabwe | 21
Scotland | 14
9 December – Port Elizabeth
Canada | 19
Spain | 29

Final
9 December – Port Elizabeth
Zimbabwe | 0
Spain | 33

=== Bowl ===
Quarter-finals
9 December – Port Elizabeth
Australia | 24
Zimbabwe | 14
9 December – Port Elizabeth
Kenya | 19
Scotland | 17
9 December – Port Elizabeth
Canada | 21
Samoa | 36
9 December – Port Elizabeth
England | 14
Spain | 7

Semi-finals
9 December – Port Elizabeth
Australia | 24
Kenya | 21
9 December – Port Elizabeth
Samoa | 15
England | 12

Final
9 December – Port Elizabeth
Australia | 26
Samoa | 14

=== Plate ===
Quarter-finals
9 December – Port Elizabeth
South Africa | 17
United States | 7
9 December – Port Elizabeth
Wales | 5
New Zealand | 35
9 December – Port Elizabeth
Portugal | 7
France | 10
9 December – Port Elizabeth
Fiji | 12
Argentina | 15

Semi-finals
9 December – Port Elizabeth
United States | 19
Wales | 26
9 December – Port Elizabeth
Portugal | 12
Fiji | 26

Final
9 December – Port Elizabeth
Wales | 26
Fiji | 14

=== Cup ===
Quarter-finals
9 December – Port Elizabeth
South Africa | 17
United States | 7
9 December – Port Elizabeth
Wales | 5
New Zealand | 35
9 December – Port Elizabeth
Portugal | 7
France | 10
9 December – Port Elizabeth
Fiji | 12
Argentina | 15

Semi-finals
9 December – Port Elizabeth
South Africa | 5
New Zealand | 12
9 December – Port Elizabeth
France | 10
Argentina | 7

Final
9 December – Port Elizabeth
New Zealand | 47
France | 12
Third place
9 December – Port Elizabeth
South Africa | 35
Argentina | 0
