= 2013 Japan Sevens =

- Host nation: Japan
- Date: 30–31 March 2013

Cup
- Champion: South Africa
- Runner-up: New Zealand
- Third: Australia

Plate
- Winner: United States
- Runner-up: Scotland

Bowl
- Winner: England
- Runner-up: Argentina

Shield
- Winner: Canada
- Runner-up: Japan

Tournament details
- Matches played: 45
- Tries scored: 245 (average 5.44 per match)
- Most points: (England) Dan Norton (50 points)
- Most tries: (England) Dan Norton (10 tries)

The 2013 Japan Sevens was the second edition of the tournament and the seventh tournament of the 2012–13 IRB Sevens World Series. The host stadium was the Chichibunomiya Rugby Stadium.

South Africa won the title by defeating New Zealand 24–19 in the final.

== Format ==
The teams were divided into pools of four teams, who played a round-robin within the pool. Points were awarded in each pool on a different schedule from most rugby tournaments—3 for a win, 2 for a draw, 1 for a loss. The top two teams in each pool advanced to the Cup competition. The four quarterfinal losers dropped into the bracket for the Plate. The Bowl was contested by the third- and fourth-place finishers in each pool, with the losers in the Bowl quarterfinals dropping into the bracket for the Shield.

== Teams ==
The participating teams are:

- Argentina
- Australia
- Canada
- England
- Fiji
- France
- Japan
- Kenya
- New Zealand
- Portugal
- Samoa
- Scotland
- South Africa
- Spain
- United States
- Wales

== Pool stage ==
The draw was made on 24 March 2013.

Key to colours in group tables
Teams that advanced to the Cup Quarterfinal

=== Pool A ===
Teams	Pld	W	D	L	PF	PA	+/−	Pts
Fiji	3	3	0	0	80	24	+56	9
South Africa	3	2	0	1	66	36	+30	7
Spain	3	1	0	2	29	73	−44	5
Portugal	3	0	0	3	21	63	−42	3

30 March 2013
10:44

Fiji	29 – 12	South Africa
	Report^{[usurped]}

Chichibunomiya Rugby Stadium

30 March 2013
11:06

Portugal	14 – 17	Spain
	Report^{[usurped]}

Chichibunomiya Rugby Stadium

30 March 2013
14:51

Fiji	17 – 5	Spain
	Report^{[usurped]}

Chichibunomiya Rugby Stadium

30 March 2013
15:13

Portugal	0 – 12	South Africa
	Report^{[usurped]}

Chichibunomiya Rugby Stadium

30 March 2013
17:57

South Africa	42 – 7	Spain
	Report^{[usurped]}

Chichibunomiya Rugby Stadium

30 March 2013
18:19

Fiji	34 – 7	Portugal
	Report^{[usurped]}

Chichibunomiya Rugby Stadium

=== Pool B ===
Teams	Pld	W	D	L	PF	PA	+/−	Pts
Scotland	3	2	1	0	36	22	+14	8
United States	3	1	1	1	46	55	−9	6
Wales	3	1	0	2	65	51	+14	5
Kenya	3	1	0	2	36	55	−19	5

30 March 2013
11:28

Wales	22 – 24	United States
	Report^{[usurped]}

Chichibunomiya Rugby Stadium

30 March 2013
11:50

Kenya	0 – 12	Scotland
	Report^{[usurped]}

Chichibunomiya Rugby Stadium

30 March 2013
15:35

Wales	10 – 12	Scotland
	Report^{[usurped]}

Chichibunomiya Rugby Stadium

30 March 2013
15:57

Kenya	21 – 10	United States
	Report^{[usurped]}

Chichibunomiya Rugby Stadium

30 March 2013
18:41

United States	12 – 12	Scotland
	Report^{[usurped]}

Chichibunomiya Rugby Stadium

30 March 2013
19:03

Wales	33 – 15	Kenya
	Report^{[usurped]}

Chichibunomiya Rugby Stadium

=== Pool C ===
Teams	Pld	W	D	L	PF	PA	+/−	Pts
New Zealand	3	3	0	0	89	24	+65	9
France	3	1	0	2	50	55	−5	5
Canada	3	1	0	2	44	55	−11	5
Japan	3	1	0	2	26	75	−49	5

30 March 2013
12:12

New Zealand	26 – 7	France
	Report^{[usurped]}

Chichibunomiya Rugby Stadium

30 March 2013
12:34

Canada	10 – 14	Japan
	Report^{[usurped]}

Chichibunomiya Rugby Stadium

30 March 2013
16:19

New Zealand	41 – 5	Japan
	Report^{[usurped]}

Chichibunomiya Rugby Stadium

30 March 2013
16:41

Canada	22 – 19	France
	Report^{[usurped]}

Chichibunomiya Rugby Stadium

30 March 2013
19:25

France	24 – 7	Japan
	Report^{[usurped]}

Chichibunomiya Rugby Stadium

30 March 2013
19:47

New Zealand	22 – 12	Canada
	Report^{[usurped]}

Chichibunomiya Rugby Stadium

=== Pool D ===
Teams	Pld	W	D	L	PF	PA	+/−	Pts
Samoa	3	3	0	0	74	49	+25	9
Australia	3	2	0	1	71	45	+26	7
England	3	1	0	2	71	64	+7	5
Argentina	3	0	0	3	21	79	−58	3

30 March 2013
10:00

Australia	26 – 19	England
	Report^{[usurped]}

Chichibunomiya Rugby Stadium

30 March 2013
10:20

Samoa	17 – 14	Argentina
	Report^{[usurped]}

Chichibunomiya Rugby Stadium

30 March 2013
14:07

Australia	31 – 0	Argentina
	Report^{[usurped]}

Chichibunomiya Rugby Stadium

30 March 2013
14:29

Samoa	31 – 21	England
	Report^{[usurped]}

Chichibunomiya Rugby Stadium

30 March 2013
17:13

England	31 – 7	Argentina
	Report^{[usurped]}

Chichibunomiya Rugby Stadium

30 March 2013
17:35

Australia	14 – 26	Samoa
	Report^{[usurped]}

Chichibunomiya Rugby Stadium

== Knockout stage ==
=== Shield ===
Quarter-finals
31 March – 09:00 – Chichibunomiya Rugby Stadium
Spain	0
Argentina	14
31 March – 09:22 – Chichibunomiya Rugby Stadium
Canada	5
Kenya	17
31 March – 09:44 – Chichibunomiya Rugby Stadium
England	40
Portugal	0
31 March – 10:06 – Chichibunomiya Rugby Stadium
Wales	22
Japan	14

Semi-finals
31 March – 11:56 – Chichibunomiya Rugby Stadium
Spain	0
Canada	38
31 March – 12:18 – Chichibunomiya Rugby Stadium
Portugal	15
Japan	19

Final
31 March – 14:52 Chichibunomiya Rugby Stadium
Canada	27
Japan	14

=== Bowl ===
Quarter-finals
31 March – 09:00 – Chichibunomiya Rugby Stadium
Spain	0
Argentina	14
31 March – 09:22 – Chichibunomiya Rugby Stadium
Canada	5
Kenya	17
31 March – 09:44 – Chichibunomiya Rugby Stadium
England	40
Portugal	0
31 March – 10:06 – Chichibunomiya Rugby Stadium
Wales	22
Japan	14

Semi-finals
31 March – 12:40 – Chichibunomiya Rugby Stadium
Argentina	12
Kenya	10
31 March – 13:02 – Chichibunomiya Rugby Stadium
England	21
Wales	19

Final
31 March – 15:17 – Chichibunomiya Rugby Stadium
Argentina	0
England	38

=== Plate ===
Quarter-finals
31 March – 10:28 – Chichibunomiya Rugby Stadium
Fiji	12
Australia	21
31 March – 10:50 – Chichibunomiya Rugby Stadium
New Zealand	19
United States	12
31 March – 11:12 – Chichibunomiya Rugby Stadium
Samoa	12
South Africa	19
31 March – 11:34 – Chichibunomiya Rugby Stadium
Scotland	10
France	14

Semi-finals
31 March – 13:24 – Chichibunomiya Rugby Stadium
Fiji	19
United States	21
31 March – 13:46 – Chichibunomiya Rugby Stadium
Samoa	17
Scotland	21

Final
31 March – 15:42 – Chichibunomiya Rugby Stadium
United States	17
Scotland	0

=== Cup ===
Quarter-finals
31 March – 10:28 – Chichibunomiya Rugby Stadium
Fiji	12
Australia	21
31 March – 10:50 – Chichibunomiya Rugby Stadium
New Zealand	19
United States	12
31 March – 11:12 – Chichibunomiya Rugby Stadium
Samoa	12
South Africa	19
31 March – 11:34 – Chichibunomiya Rugby Stadium
Scotland	10
France	14

Semi-finals
31 March – 14:08 – Chichibunomiya Rugby Stadium
Australia	17
New Zealand	35
31 March – 14:30 – Chichibunomiya Rugby Stadium
South Africa	14
France	12

Final
31 March – 16:33 – Chichibunomiya Rugby Stadium
New Zealand	19
South Africa	24
Third place
31 March – 16:07 – Chichibunomiya Rugby Stadium
Australia	31
France	7
