= 2000 Tokyo Sevens =

- IRB Sevens I
- Host nation: Japan
- Date: 1–2 April 2000

Cup
- Champion: Fiji
- Runner-up: New Zealand

Plate
- Winner: Japan
- Runner-up: Papua New Guinea

Bowl
- Winner: Samoa
- Runner-up: South Korea

Tournament details
- Matches played: 41

The 2000 Tokyo Sevens was an international rugby sevens tournament that was part of the World Sevens Series in the inaugural 1999–2000 season. It was the Japan Sevens leg of the series, held at Chichibunomiya Rugby Stadium in Tokyo on 1–2 April 2000.

The tournament was the ninth event of the series, and was won by Fiji who defeated New Zealand 27–22 in the Cup final.

== Format ==
The teams were drawn into four pools of four teams each. Each team played the other teams in their pool once, with 3 points awarded for a win, 2 points for a draw, and 1 point for a loss (no points awarded for a forfeit). The pool stage was played on the first day of the tournament. The top two teams from each pool advanced to the Cup/Plate brackets. The bottom two teams from each pool went on to the Bowl bracket. No Shield trophy was on offer in the 1999-2000 season.

== Teams ==
The 16 participating teams for the tournament:

- Australia
- Canada
- Fiji
- France
- Hong Kong
- Japan
- Malaysia
- New Zealand
- Papua New Guinea
- Samoa
- Singapore
- South Africa
- South Korea
- Sri Lanka
- Chinese Taipei
- United States

== Pool stage ==
The pool stage was played on the first day of the tournament. The 16 teams were separated into four pools of four teams and teams in the same pool played each other once. The top two teams in each pool advanced to the Cup quarterfinals to compete for the 2000 Tokyo Sevens title.

Key to colours in group tables
Teams that advanced to the Cup quarterfinals
Teams that advanced to the Bowl quarterfinals

=== Pool A ===
Pos	Team	Pld	W	D	L	PF	PA	PD	Pts
1	Fiji	3	3	0	0	147	10	137	9
2	Papua New Guinea	3	2	0	1	106	40	66	7
3	Hong Kong	3	1	0	2	31	106	−75	5
4	Sri Lanka	3	0	0	3	14	142	−128	3

Source: World Rugby

1 April 2000

Fiji	64–0	Sri Lanka

Chichibunomiya Rugby Stadium, Tokyo

1 April 2000

Papua New Guinea	49–0	Hong Kong

Chichibunomiya Rugby Stadium, Tokyo

1 April 2000

Hong Kong	26–14	Sri Lanka

Chichibunomiya Rugby Stadium, Tokyo

1 April 2000

Fiji	40–5	Papua New Guinea

Chichibunomiya Rugby Stadium, Tokyo

1 April 2000

Papua New Guinea	52–0	Sri Lanka

Chichibunomiya Rugby Stadium, Tokyo

1 April 2000

Fiji	43–5	Hong Kong

Chichibunomiya Rugby Stadium, Tokyo

Source: World Rugby

=== Pool B ===
Pos	Team	Pld	W	D	L	PF	PA	PD	Pts
1	New Zealand	3	3	0	0	111	5	106	9
2	France	3	2	0	1	78	33	45	7
3	United States	3	1	0	2	36	78	−42	5
4	Chinese Taipei	3	0	0	3	12	121	−109	3

Source: World Rugby

1 April 2000

New Zealand	50–0	Chinese Taipei

Chichibunomiya Rugby Stadium, Tokyo

1 April 2000

France	26–12	United States

Chichibunomiya Rugby Stadium, Tokyo

1 April 2000

France	47–0	Chinese Taipei

Chichibunomiya Rugby Stadium, Tokyo

1 April 2000

New Zealand	40–0	United States

Chichibunomiya Rugby Stadium, Tokyo

1 April 2000

United States	24–12	Chinese Taipei

Chichibunomiya Rugby Stadium, Tokyo

1 April 2000

New Zealand	21–5	France

Chichibunomiya Rugby Stadium, Tokyo

Source: World Rugby

=== Pool C ===
Pos	Team	Pld	W	D	L	PF	PA	PD	Pts
1	Australia	3	3	0	0	139	0	139	9
2	Canada	3	2	0	1	78	50	28	7
3	South Korea	3	1	0	2	62	59	3	5
4	Singapore	3	0	0	3	7	177	−170	3

Source: World Rugby

1 April 2000

Australia	63–0	Singapore

Chichibunomiya Rugby Stadium, Tokyo

1 April 2000

Canada	14–12	South Korea

Chichibunomiya Rugby Stadium, Tokyo

1 April 2000

Canada	64–0	Singapore

Chichibunomiya Rugby Stadium, Tokyo

1 April 2000

South Korea	50–7	Singapore

Chichibunomiya Rugby Stadium, Tokyo

1 April 2000

Australia	38–0	South Korea

Chichibunomiya Rugby Stadium, Tokyo

1 April 2000

Australia	38–0	Canada

Chichibunomiya Rugby Stadium, Tokyo

Source: World Rugby

=== Pool D ===
Pos	Team	Pld	W	D	L	PF	PA	PD	Pts
1	Japan	3	2	1	0	99	52	47	8
2	South Africa	3	2	0	1	117	34	83	7
3	Samoa	3	1	1	1	113	42	71	6
4	Malaysia	3	0	0	3	5	206	−201	3

Source: World Rugby

1 April 2000

Samoa	75–0	Malaysia

Chichibunomiya Rugby Stadium, Tokyo

1 April 2000

Japan	24–19	South Africa

Chichibunomiya Rugby Stadium, Tokyo

1 April 2000

South Africa	84–0	Malaysia

Chichibunomiya Rugby Stadium, Tokyo

1 April 2000

Samoa	28–28	Japan

Chichibunomiya Rugby Stadium, Tokyo

1 April 2000

Japan	47–5	Malaysia

Chichibunomiya Rugby Stadium, Tokyo

1 April 2000

South Africa	14–10	Samoa

Chichibunomiya Rugby Stadium, Tokyo

Source: World Rugby

== Knockout stage ==
=== Bowl ===
Quarter-finals
2 April 2000 – Chichibunomiya Rugby Stadium
Hong Kong	24
Chinese Taipei	19
2 April 2000 – Chichibunomiya Rugby Stadium
Samoa	63
Singapore	0
2 April 2000 – Chichibunomiya Rugby Stadium
South Korea	66
Malaysia	0
2 April 2000 – Chichibunomiya Rugby Stadium
United States	31
Sri Lanka	7

Semi-finals
2 April 2000 – Chichibunomiya Rugby Stadium
Hong Kong	0
Samoa	24
2 April 2000 – Chichibunomiya Rugby Stadium
South Korea	42
United States	5

Final
2 April 2000 – Chichibunomiya Rugby Stadium
Samoa	19
South Korea	12

Source: World Rugby

=== Plate ===
Semi-finals
2 April 2000 – Chichibunomiya Rugby Stadium
France	7
Japan	12
2 April 2000 – Chichibunomiya Rugby Stadium
South Africa	19
Papua New Guinea	21

Final
2 April 2000 – Chichibunomiya Rugby Stadium
Japan	26
Papua New Guinea	14

Source: World Rugby

=== Cup ===
Quarter-finals
2 April 2000 – Chichibunomiya Rugby Stadium
Fiji	34
France	14
2 April 2000 – Chichibunomiya Rugby Stadium
Canada	26
Japan	0
2 April 2000 – Chichibunomiya Rugby Stadium
Australia	50
South Africa	0
2 April 2000 – Chichibunomiya Rugby Stadium
New Zealand	35
Papua New Guinea	0

Semi-finals
2 April 2000 – Chichibunomiya Rugby Stadium
Fiji	19
Canada	5
2 April 2000 – Chichibunomiya Rugby Stadium
Australia	0
New Zealand	19

Final
2 April 2000 – Chichibunomiya Rugby Stadium
Fiji	27
New Zealand	22

Source: World Rugby

== Tournament placings ==
Place	Team	Points
1st place, gold medalist(s)	Fiji	20
2nd place, silver medalist(s)	New Zealand	16
3rd place, bronze medalist(s)	Australia	12
3rd place, bronze medalist(s)	Canada	12
5	Japan	8
6	Papua New Guinea	6
7	France	4
7	South Africa	4

Place	Team	Points
9	Samoa	2
10	South Korea	0
11	Hong Kong	0
11	United States	0
13	Chinese Taipei	0
13	Malaysia	0
13	Singapore	0
13	Sri Lanka	0

Source: Rugby7.com

== Series standings ==
At the completion of Round 9:

Pos.	Event Team	Dubai	Stellenbosch	Punta del Este	Mar del Plata	Wellington	Suva	Brisbane	Hong Kong	Tokyo	Paris	Points total
1	Fiji	16	20	16	20	20	16	20	24	20		172
2	New Zealand	20	16	20	16	16	20	12	30	16		166
3	Australia	8	8	8	12	12	12	16	18	12		106
4	Samoa	12	6	12	12	12	12	4	8	2		80
5	South Africa	12	12	12	4	6	6	0 ^{a}	8	4		64
6	Canada	4	4	6	6	8	4	4	8	12		56
7	Argentina	—	0	4	8	4	8	8	8	—		40
8	France	6	0	2	4	2	0	6	4	4		28
9	England	—	—	—	—	—	—	—	18	—		18
10	Georgia	0	12	—	—	—	—	—	—	—		12
11	Tonga	4	2	—	—	4	0	2	—	—		12
12	Japan	0	0	—	—	0	0	0	0	8		8
13	Papua New Guinea	—	—	—	—	0	2	0	—	6		8
14	Uruguay	—	0	4	0	0	4	0	—	—		8
15	Morocco	0	4	—	—	—	—	—	—	—		4
16	Scotland	2	—	—	—	—	—	—	0	—		2
16	Spain	—	—	0	2	—	—	—	—	—		2
18	United States	0	—	0	0	0	0	0	0	0		0
19	Hong Kong	0	—	—	—	0	—	0	0	0		0
20	Cook Islands	—	—	—	—	0	0	0	—	—		0
20	Croatia	—	—	—	—	0	0	—	0	—		0
22	Brazil	—	—	0	0	—	—	—	—	—		0
22	Chile	—	—	0	0	—	—	—	—	—		0
22	China	—	—	—	—	—	—	0	0	—		0
22	Chinese Taipei	—	—	—	—	—	—	—	0	0		0
22	Germany	—	—	0	0	—	—	—	—	—		0
22	Kenya	0	0	—	—	—	—	—	—	—		0
22	Malaysia	—	—	—	—	—	—	—	0	0		0
22	Paraguay	—	—	0	0	—	—	—	—	—		0
22	Peru	—	—	0	0	—	—	—	—	—		0
22	Singapore	—	—	—	—	—	—	—	0	0		0
22	South Korea	—	—	—	—	—	—	—	0	0		0
22	Sri Lanka	—	—	—	—	—	—	—	0	0		0
22	Zimbabwe	0	0	—	—	—	—	—	—	—		0
35	(Cooperation Council for the Arab States of the Gulf) Arabian Gulf	—	—	—	—	—	—	—	0	—		0
35	Ireland	—	—	—	—	—	—	—	0	—		0
35	Italy	—	—	—	—	—	—	—	0	—		0
35	Namibia	—	0	—	—	—	—	—	—	—		0
35	Thailand	—	—	—	—	—	—	—	0	—		0
35	Vanuatu	—	—	—	—	—	0	—	—	—		0

Source: Rugby7.com

^a South Africa reached the semifinal stage of the Brisbane Sevens but was stripped of all points for the tournament due to fielding ineligible players.

IRB Sevens I
Preceded by 2000 Hong Kong Sevens	2000 Tokyo Sevens	Succeeded by 2000 Paris Sevens
Japan Sevens
Preceded by 1999 Tokyo Sevens	2000 Tokyo Sevens	Succeeded by 2001 Tokyo Sevens
