= 2000 Brisbane Sevens =

- IRB Sevens I
- Host nation: Australia
- Date: 18–19 February 2000

Cup
- Champion: Fiji
- Runner-up: Australia

Plate
- Winner: Argentina
- Runner-up: France

Bowl
- Winner: Tonga
- Runner-up: Papua New Guinea

Tournament details
- Matches played: 41

The 2000 Brisbane Sevens, officially called the 2000 Brisbane International Sevens, was an international rugby sevens tournament that was part of the World Sevens Series in the inaugural 1999–2000 season. It was the Australian Sevens leg of the series, held on 18–19 February 2000, at Lang Park (Suncorp Stadium) in Brisbane.

The tournament was the first edition of the Australian Sevens within the World Sevens Series, and was won by Fiji who defeated Australia 24–21 in the Cup final with a sensational try in the final seconds to Waisale Serevi.

== Teams ==
The participating teams were:

- Argentina
- Australia
- Canada
- China
- Cook Islands
- Fiji
- France
- Hong Kong
- Japan
- New Zealand
- Papua New Guinea
- Samoa
- South Africa
- Tonga
- United States
- Uruguay

== Format ==
The teams were drawn into four pools of four teams each. Each team played the other teams in their pool once, with 3 points awarded for a win, 2 points for a draw, and 1 point for a loss (no points awarded for a forfeit). The pool stage was played on the first day of the tournament. The top two teams from each pool advanced to the Cup/Plate brackets. The bottom two teams from each pool went on to the Bowl bracket. No Shield trophy was on offer in the 1999-2000 season.

== Pool stage ==
Key to colours in group tables
Teams that advanced to the Cup quarterfinals
Teams that advanced to the Bowl quarterfinals

=== Pool A ===
Pos	Team	Pld	W	D	L	PF	PA	PD	Pts
1	Canada	3	3	0	0	81	29	52	9
2	Samoa	3	2	0	1	83	29	54	7
3	Papua New Guinea	3	1	0	2	64	87	-23	5
4	Hong Kong	3	0	0	3	22	105	-83	3

Source World Rugby

18 February 2000

Canada	36–5	Hong Kong

Lang Park, Brisbane

18 February 2000

Samoa	47–7	Papua New Guinea

Lang Park, Brisbane

18 February 2000

Canada	28–17	Papua New Guinea

Lang Park, Brisbane

18 February 2000

Samoa	29–5	Hong Kong

Lang Park, Brisbane

18 February 2000

Papua New Guinea	40–12	Hong Kong

Lang Park, Brisbane

18 February 2000

Canada	17–7	Samoa

Lang Park, Brisbane

Source World Rugby

=== Pool B ===
Pos	Team	Pld	W	D	L	PF	PA	PD	Pts
1	Fiji	3	3	0	0	127	21	106	9
2	Argentina	3	2	0	1	70	38	22	7
3	Uruguay	3	1	0	2	31	70	-39	5
4	Cook Islands	3	0	0	3	7	106	-89	3

Source World Rugby

18 February 2000

Argentina	21–0	Uruguay

Lang Park, Brisbane

18 February 2000

Fiji	40–7	Cook Islands

Lang Park, Brisbane

18 February 2000

Argentina	35–0	Cook Islands

Lang Park, Brisbane

18 February 2000

Fiji	49–0	Uruguay

Lang Park, Brisbane

18 February 2000

Uruguay	31–0	Cook Islands

Lang Park, Brisbane

18 February 2000

Fiji	38–14	Argentina

Lang Park, Brisbane

Source World Rugby

=== Pool C ===
Pos	Team	Pld	W	D	L	PF	PA	PD	Pts
1	New Zealand	3	3	0	0	92	22	65	9
2	France	3	2	0	1	61	59	7	7
3	Tonga	3	1	0	2	55	80	-25	5
4	Japan	3	0	0	3	52	99	-47	3

Source World Rugby

18 February 2000

France	33–14	Tonga

Lang Park, Brisbane

18 February 2000

New Zealand	47–5	Japan

Lang Park, Brisbane

18 February 2000

France	21–19	Japan

Lang Park, Brisbane

18 February 2000

New Zealand	19–10	Tonga

Lang Park, Brisbane

18 February 2000

Tonga	31–28	Japan

Lang Park, Brisbane

18 February 2000

New Zealand	26–7	France

Lang Park, Brisbane

Source World Rugby

=== Pool D ===
Pos	Team	Pld	W	D	L	PF	PA	PD	Pts
1	Australia	3	3	0	0	125	0	125	9
2	South Africa	3	2	0	1	73	35	38	7
3	United States	3	1	0	2	29	92	-63	5
4	China	3	0	0	3	19	119	-100	3

Source World Rugby

18 February 2000

South Africa	33–7	China

Lang Park, Brisbane

18 February 2000

Australia	40–0	United States

Lang Park, Brisbane

18 February 2000

South Africa	40–0	United States

Lang Park, Brisbane

18 February 2000

Australia	57–0	China

Lang Park, Brisbane

18 February 2000

United States	29–12	China

Lang Park, Brisbane

18 February 2000

Australia	28–0	South Africa

Lang Park, Brisbane

== Knockout stage ==
Play on the second day of the tournament consisted of finals matches for the Bowl, Plate, and Cup competitions. The following is a list of the recorded results.

=== Bowl ===
Quarter-finals
19 February – Lang Park
Tonga	35
Cook Islands	0
19 February – Lang Park
Hong Kong	22
United States	12
19 February – Lang Park
Uruguay	14
Japan	12
19 February – Lang Park
Papua New Guinea	40
China	17

Semi-finals
19 February – Lang Park
Tonga	42
Hong Kong	0
19 February – Lang Park
Papua New Guinea	31
Uruguay	10

Final
19 February – Lang Park
Tonga	43
Papua New Guinea	0

Source: World Rugby

=== Plate ===
Quarter-finals
19 February – Lang Park
New Zealand	33
Argentina	12
19 February – Lang Park
Australia	12
Samoa	5
19 February – Lang Park
South Africa	14
Canada	7
19 February – Lang Park
Fiji	47
France	7

Semi-finals
19 February – Lang Park
Argentina	10
Samoa	7
19 February – Lang Park
Canada	14
France	19

Final
19 February – Lang Park
Argentina	33
France	14

Source: World Rugby

=== Cup ===
Quarter-finals
19 February – Lang Park
New Zealand	33
Argentina	12
19 February – Lang Park
Australia	12
Samoa	5
19 February – Lang Park
South Africa	14
Canada	7
19 February – Lang Park
Fiji	47
France	7

Semi-finals
19 February – Lang Park
New Zealand	0
Australia	17
19 February – Lang Park
South Africa	7
Fiji	45

Final
19 February – Lang Park
Australia	21
Fiji	24

Source: World Rugby

By beating New Zealand in the semifinals, Australia became only the third different nation to reach a World Sevens Series Cup final. Fiji and New Zealand had contested each of the previous six Series Cup finals.

== Tournament placings ==
Place	Team	Points
1st place, gold medalist(s)	Fiji	20
2nd place, silver medalist(s)	Australia	16
3rd place, bronze medalist(s)	New Zealand	12
n/a	South Africa ^{a}	~~12~~ 0
5	Argentina	8
6	France	6
7	Canada	4
7	Samoa	4

Place	Team	Points
9	Tonga	2
10	Papua New Guinea	0
11	Hong Kong	0
11	Uruguay	0
13	China	0
13	Cook Islands	0
13	Japan	0
13	United States	0

Source: Rugby7.com

== Series standings ==
At the completion of Round 7:

Pos.	Event Team	Dubai	Stellenbosch	Punta del Este	Mar del Plata	Wellington	Suva	Brisbane	Hong Kong	Tokyo	Paris	Points total
1	Fiji	16	20	16	20	20	16	20				128
2	New Zealand	20	16	20	16	16	20	12				120
3	Australia	8	8	8	12	12	12	16				76
4	Samoa	12	6	12	12	12	12	4				70
5	South Africa	12	12	12	4	6	6	0 ^{a}				52
6	Canada	4	4	6	6	8	4	4				36
7	Argentina	—	0	4	8	4	8	8				32
8	France	6	0	2	4	2	0	6				20
9	Georgia	0	12	—	—	—	—	—				12
10	Tonga	4	2	—	—	4	0	2				12
11	Uruguay	—	0	4	0	0	4	0				8
12	Morocco	0	4	—	—	—	—	—				4
13	Papua New Guinea	—	—	—	—	0	2	0				2
13	Scotland	2	—	—	—	—	—	—				2
13	Spain	—	—	0	2	—	—	—				2
16	United States	0	—	0	0	0	0	0				0
17	Japan	0	0	—	—	0	0	0				0
18	Cook Islands	—	—	—	—	0	0	0				0
18	Hong Kong	0	—	—	—	0	—	0				0
20	Brazil	—	—	0	0	—	—	—				0
20	Chile	—	—	0	0	—	—	—				0
20	Croatia	—	—	—	—	0	0	—				0
20	Germany	—	—	0	0	—	—	—				0
20	Kenya	0	0	—	—	—	—	—				0
20	Paraguay	—	—	0	0	—	—	—				0
20	Peru	—	—	0	0	—	—	—				0
20	Zimbabwe	0	0	—	—	—	—	—				0
28	China	—	—	—	—	—	—	0				0
28	Namibia	—	0	—	—	—	—	—				0
28	Vanuatu	—	—	—	—	—	0	—				0

Source: Rugby7.com

== Notes ==
^a South Africa reached the semifinal stage of the Brisbane Sevens but was stripped of all points for the tournament due to fielding ineligible players.

IRB Sevens I
Preceded by 2000 Fiji Sevens	2000 Brisbane Sevens	Succeeded by 2000 Hong Kong Sevens
Australian Sevens
Preceded by First	2000 Brisbane Sevens	Succeeded by 2002 Brisbane Sevens (2001 event cancelled)
