= 2000 Hong Kong Sevens =

International rugby sevens tournament

- IRB Sevens I
- Host nation: Hong Kong
- Date: 24–26 March 2000

Cup
- Champion: New Zealand
- Runner-up: Fiji

Plate
- Winner: France
- Runner-up: Croatia

Bowl
- Winner: Ireland
- Runner-up: China

Tournament details
- Matches played: 57

The 2000 Hong Kong Sevens was an international rugby sevens tournament that was part of the inaugural World Sevens Series, the 1999–2000 season. It was the eighth leg of the series, held on 24–26 March 2000, at the Hong Kong Stadium, Hong Kong.

The tournament was the first edition of the Hong Kong Sevens within the World Sevens Series and contained 24 teams, an increase of eight from the other tournaments held in the Series. It was won by New Zealand who defeated Fiji 31–5 in the Cup final to win their fourth title of the Series.

== Teams ==
The 24 participating teams were:

- (Cooperation Council for the Arab States of the Gulf) Arabian Gulf
- Argentina
- Australia
- Canada
- China
- Chinese Taipei
- Croatia
- England
- Fiji
- France
- Hong Kong
- Ireland
- Italy
- Japan
- Malaysia
- New Zealand
- Samoa
- Scotland
- Singapore
- South Africa
- South Korea
- Sri Lanka
- Thailand
- United States

== Format ==
With the increased number of teams competing, the teams were drawn into six pools of four teams each. Each team played the other teams in their pool once, with 3 points awarded for a win, 2 points for a draw, and 1 point for a loss (no points awarded for a forfeit). The pool stage was played over the first two days of the tournament. The top team from each pool along with the two best runners-up advanced to the Cup quarter finals. The remaining four runners-up along with the four best third-placed teams advanced to the Plate quarter finals. The remaining eight teams went on to the Bowl quarter finals. No Shield trophy was on offer in the 1999–2000 season.

== Pool stage ==
Key to colours in group tables
Teams that advanced to the Cup quarterfinals
Teams that advanced to the Plate quarterfinals
Teams that advanced to the Bowl quarterfinals

=== Pool A ===
Pos	Team	Pld	W	D	L	PF	PA	PD	Pts
1	Fiji	3	3	0	0	167	19	+148	9
2	United States	3	2	0	1	64	66	−2	7
3	South Korea	3	1	0	2	73	64	+9	5
4	China	3	0	0	3	14	169	−155	3

Source: World Rugby Archived 2016-07-01 at the Wayback Machine

24 March 2000

Fiji	80–0	China

Hong Kong Stadium, Hong Kong

24 March 2000

United States	17–12	South Korea

Hong Kong Stadium, Hong Kong

25 March 2000

United States	40–0	China

Hong Kong Stadium, Hong Kong

25 March 2000

Fiji	33–12	South Korea

Hong Kong Stadium, Hong Kong

25 March 2000

South Korea	49–14	China

Hong Kong Stadium, Hong Kong

25 March 2000

Fiji	54–7	United States

Hong Kong Stadium, Hong Kong

Source World Rugby

=== Pool B ===
Pos	Team	Pld	W	D	L	PF	PA	PD	Pts
1	New Zealand	3	3	0	0	147	5	+142	9
2	Italy	3	2	0	1	67	45	+22	7
3	Japan	3	1	0	2	50	64	−14	5
4	Singapore	3	0	0	3	5	155	−150	3

Source: World Rugby Archived 2016-07-01 at the Wayback Machine

24 March 2000

New Zealand	64–5	Singapore

Hong Kong Stadium, Hong Kong

24 March 2000

Italy	19–7	Japan

Hong Kong Stadium, Hong Kong

25 March 2000

Japan	43–0	Singapore

Hong Kong Stadium, Hong Kong

25 March 2000

New Zealand	38–0	Italy

Hong Kong Stadium, Hong Kong

25 March 2000

Italy	48–0	Singapore

Hong Kong Stadium, Hong Kong

25 March 2000

New Zealand	45–0	Japan

Hong Kong Stadium, Hong Kong

Source World Rugby

=== Pool C ===
Pos	Team	Pld	W	D	L	PF	PA	PD	Pts
1	Australia	3	3	0	0	106	10	+96	9
2	Hong Kong	3	2	0	1	84	38	+46	7
3	Scotland	3	1	0	2	69	71	−2	5
4	Thailand	3	0	0	3	19	159	−140	3

Source: World Rugby Archived 2016-07-01 at the Wayback Machine

24 March 2000

Australia	54–0	Thailand

Hong Kong Stadium, Hong Kong

24 March 2000

Hong Kong	24–14	Scotland

Hong Kong Stadium, Hong Kong

25 March 2000

Scotland	50–14	Thailand

Hong Kong Stadium, Hong Kong

25 March 2000

Australia	19–5	Hong Kong

Hong Kong Stadium, Hong Kong

25 March 2000

Hong Kong	55–5	Thailand

Hong Kong Stadium, Hong Kong

25 March 2000

Australia	33–5	Scotland

Hong Kong Stadium, Hong Kong

Source World Rugby

=== Pool D ===
Pos	Team	Pld	W	D	L	PF	PA	PD	Pts
1	England	3	3	0	0	124	17	+107	9
2	Samoa	3	2	0	1	81	30	+51	7
3	Sri Lanka	3	1	0	2	27	105	−78	5
4	(Cooperation Council for the Arab States of the Gulf) Arabian Gulf	3	0	0	3	22	102	−80	3

Source: World Rugby Archived 2016-07-01 at the Wayback Machine

24 March 2000

England	45–5	(Cooperation Council for the Arab States of the Gulf) Arabian Gulf

Hong Kong Stadium, Hong Kong

24 March 2000

Samoa	36–3	Sri Lanka

Hong Kong Stadium, Hong Kong

25 March 2000

England	57–0	Sri Lanka

Hong Kong Stadium, Hong Kong

25 March 2000

Samoa	33–5	(Cooperation Council for the Arab States of the Gulf) Arabian Gulf

Hong Kong Stadium, Hong Kong

25 March 2000

Sri Lanka	24–12	(Cooperation Council for the Arab States of the Gulf) Arabian Gulf

Hong Kong Stadium, Hong Kong

25 March 2000

England	22–12	Samoa

Hong Kong Stadium, Hong Kong

Source World Rugby

=== Pool E ===
Pos	Team	Pld	W	D	L	PF	PA	PD	Pts
1	South Africa	3	3	0	0	57	40	+17	9
2	France	3	2	0	1	48	17	+31	7
3	Croatia	3	1	0	2	66	43	+23	5
4	Chinese Taipei	3	0	0	3	26	97	−71	3

Source: World Rugby Archived 2016-07-01 at the Wayback Machine

24 March 2000

South Africa	21–19	Chinese Taipei

Hong Kong Stadium, Hong Kong

24 March 2000

France	10–7	Croatia

Hong Kong Stadium, Hong Kong

25 March 2000

France	31–0	Chinese Taipei

Hong Kong Stadium, Hong Kong

25 March 2000

South Africa	26–14	Croatia

Hong Kong Stadium, Hong Kong

25 March 2000

Croatia	45–7	Chinese Taipei

Hong Kong Stadium, Hong Kong

25 March 2000

South Africa	10–7	France

Hong Kong Stadium, Hong Kong

Source World Rugby

=== Pool F ===
Pos	Team	Pld	W	D	L	PF	PA	PD	Pts
1	Canada	3	3	0	0	101	12	+89	9
2	Argentina	3	2	0	1	100	19	+81	7
3	Ireland	3	1	0	2	36	65	−29	5
4	Malaysia	3	0	0	3	17	158	−141	3

Source: World Rugby Archived 2016-07-01 at the Wayback Machine

24 March 2000

Canada	68–0	Malaysia

Hong Kong Stadium, Hong Kong

24 March 2000

Argentina	34–0	Ireland

Hong Kong Stadium, Hong Kong

25 March 2000

Argentina	59–5	Malaysia

Hong Kong Stadium, Hong Kong

25 March 2000

Canada	19–5	Ireland

Hong Kong Stadium, Hong Kong

25 March 2000

Ireland	31–12	Malaysia

Hong Kong Stadium, Hong Kong

25 March 2000

Canada	14–7	Argentina

Hong Kong Stadium, Hong Kong

Source World Rugby

== Knockout stage ==
Play on the third day of the tournament consisted of finals matches for the Bowl, Plate, and Cup competitions. The following is a list of the recorded results.

=== Bowl ===
Quarter-finals
26 March – Hong Kong Stadium
Ireland	12
Chinese Taipei	5
26 March – Hong Kong Stadium
Thailand	28
Malaysia	12
26 March – Hong Kong Stadium
(Cooperation Council for the Arab States of the Gulf) Arabian Gulf	45
Singapore	7
26 March – Hong Kong Stadium
China	26
Sri Lanka	5

Semi-finals
26 March – Hong Kong Stadium
Ireland	56
Thailand	0
26 March – Hong Kong Stadium
(Cooperation Council for the Arab States of the Gulf) Arabian Gulf	17
China	26

Final
26 March – Hong Kong Stadium
Ireland	59
China	0

Source: World Rugby

=== Plate ===
Quarter-finals
26 March – Hong Kong Stadium
Hong Kong	20
Japan	0
26 March – Hong Kong Stadium
Croatia	42
United States	7
26 March – Hong Kong Stadium
Italy	21
South Korea	19
26 March – Hong Kong Stadium
France	19
Scotland	7

Semi-finals
26 March – Hong Kong Stadium
Hong Kong	10
Croatia	14
26 March – Hong Kong Stadium
Italy	14
France	19

Final
26 March – Hong Kong Stadium
Croatia	14
France	19

Source: World Rugby

=== Cup ===
Quarter-finals
26 March – Hong Kong Stadium
Fiji	50
Samoa	0
26 March – Hong Kong Stadium
England	14
South Africa	12
26 March – Hong Kong Stadium
Australia	31
Canada	5
26 March – Hong Kong Stadium
New Zealand	29
Argentina	0

Semi-finals
26 March – Hong Kong Stadium
Fiji	52
England	7
26 March – Hong Kong Stadium
Australia	0
New Zealand	26

Final
26 March – Hong Kong Stadium
Fiji	5
New Zealand	31

Source: World Rugby

== Tournament placings ==
Place	Team	Points
1st place, gold medalist(s)	New Zealand	30
2nd place, silver medalist(s)	Fiji	24
3rd place, bronze medalist(s)	Australia	18
3rd place, bronze medalist(s)	England	18
5	Argentina	8
5	Canada	8
5	Samoa	8
5	South Africa	8
9	France	4
10	Croatia	0
11	Hong Kong	0
11	Italy	0

Place	Team	Points
13	Japan	0
13	Scotland	0
13	South Korea	0
13	United States	0
17	Ireland	0
18	China	0
19	(Cooperation Council for the Arab States of the Gulf) Arabian Gulf	0
19	Thailand	0
21	Chinese Taipei	0
21	Malaysia	0
21	Singapore	0
21	Sri Lanka	0

Source: Rugby7.com

== Series standings ==
At the completion of Round 8:

Pos.	Event Team	Dubai	Stellenbosch	Punta del Este	Mar del Plata	Wellington	Suva	Brisbane	Hong Kong	Tokyo	Paris	Points total
1	Fiji	16	20	16	20	20	16	20	24			152
2	New Zealand	20	16	20	16	16	20	12	30			150
3	Australia	8	8	8	12	12	12	16	18			94
4	Samoa	12	6	12	12	12	12	4	8			78
5	South Africa	12	12	12	4	6	6	0 ^{a}	8			60
6	Canada	4	4	6	6	8	4	4	8			44
7	Argentina	—	0	4	8	4	8	8	8			40
8	France	6	0	2	4	2	0	6	4			24
9	England	—	—	—	—	—	—	—	18			18
10	Georgia	0	12	—	—	—	—	—	—			12
11	Tonga	4	2	—	—	4	0	2	—			12
12	Uruguay	—	0	4	0	0	4	0	—			8
13	Morocco	0	4	—	—	—	—	—	—			4
14	Papua New Guinea	—	—	—	—	0	2	0	—			2
14	Scotland	2	—	—	—	—	—	—	0			2
14	Spain	—	—	0	2	—	—	—	—			2
17	United States	0	—	0	0	0	0	0	0			0
18	Japan	0	0	—	—	0	0	0	0			0
19	Hong Kong	0	—	—	—	0	—	0	0			0
20	Cook Islands	—	—	—	—	0	0	0	—			0
20	Croatia	—	—	—	—	0	0	—	0			0
22	Brazil	—	—	0	0	—	—	—	—			0
22	Chile	—	—	0	0	—	—	—	—			0
22	China	—	—	—	—	—	—	0	0			0
22	Germany	—	—	0	0	—	—	—	—			0
22	Kenya	0	0	—	—	—	—	—	—			0
22	Paraguay	—	—	0	0	—	—	—	—			0
22	Peru	—	—	0	0	—	—	—	—			0
22	Zimbabwe	0	0	—	—	—	—	—	—			0
30	(Cooperation Council for the Arab States of the Gulf) Arabian Gulf	—	—	—	—	—	—	—	0			0
30	Chinese Taipei	—	—	—	—	—	—	—	0			0
30	Ireland	—	—	—	—	—	—	—	0			0
30	Italy	—	—	—	—	—	—	—	0			0
30	Malaysia	—	—	—	—	—	—	—	0			0
30	Namibia	—	0	—	—	—	—	—	—			0
30	South Korea	—	—	—	—	—	—	—	0			0
30	Singapore	—	—	—	—	—	—	—	0			0
30	Sri Lanka	—	—	—	—	—	—	—	0			0
30	Thailand	—	—	—	—	—	—	—	0			0
30	Vanuatu	—	—	—	—	—	0	—	—			0

Source: Rugby7.com

^a South Africa reached the semifinal stage of the Brisbane Sevens but was stripped of all points for the tournament due to fielding ineligible players.

IRB Sevens I
Preceded by 2000 Brisbane Sevens	2000 Hong Kong Sevens	Succeeded by 2000 Japan Sevens
Hong Kong Sevens
Preceded by 1999 Hong Kong Sevens	2000 Hong Kong Sevens	Succeeded by 2001 Hong Kong Sevens
