= 2000 Paris Sevens =

- IRB Sevens I
- Host nation: France
- Date: 27–28 May 2000

Cup
- Champion: New Zealand
- Runner-up: South Africa

Plate
- Winner: Fiji
- Runner-up: France

Bowl
- Winner: Samoa
- Runner-up: Morocco

Tournament details
- Matches played: 41

The 2000 Paris Sevens was an international rugby sevens tournament that was part of the World Sevens Series in the inaugural 1999–2000 season. It was the France Sevens leg of the series, held on 27–28 May 2000, at Stade Sébastien Charléty in Paris.

Ahead of the tournament, which was the tenth and final event of the series, Fiji lead the standings by six points over New Zealand. However, following Fiji's 35–21 defeat by Argentina in the Cup quarterfinals, New Zealand became the inaugural World Sevens Series champions as they defeated South Africa 69–10 in the Cup final.

== Format ==
The teams were drawn into four pools of four teams each. Each team played the other teams in their pool once, with 3 points awarded for a win, 2 points for a draw, and 1 point for a loss (no points awarded for a forfeit). The pool stage was played on the first day of the tournament. The top two teams from each pool advanced to the Cup/Plate brackets. The bottom two teams from each pool went on to the Bowl bracket. No Shield trophy was on offer in the 1999-2000 season.

== Teams ==
The 16 participating teams for the tournament:

- Argentina
- Australia
- Canada
- England
- Fiji
- France
- French Barbarians
- Georgia
- Ireland
- Japan
- Morocco
- New Zealand
- South Africa
- Samoa
- Scotland
- United States

== Pool stage ==
The pool stage was played on the first day of the tournament. The 16 teams were separated into four pools of four teams and teams in the same pool played each other once. The top two teams in each pool advanced to the Cup quarterfinals to compete for the 2000 Fiji Sevens title.

Key to colours in group tables
Teams that advanced to the Cup quarterfinals
Teams that advanced to the Bowl quarterfinals

=== Pool A ===
Pos	Team	Pld	W	D	L	PF	PA	PD	Pts
1	Fiji	3	3	0	0	146	14	132	9
2	France	3	2	0	1	101	57	44	7
3	Ireland	3	1	0	2	57	104	-47	5
4	Japan	3	0	0	3	19	148	–129	3

Source: World Rugby

27 May 2000

Fiji	61–0	Japan

Stade Sébastien Charléty, Paris

27 May 2000

France	40–17	Ireland

Stade Sébastien Charléty, Paris

27 May 2000

Fiji	50–0	Ireland

Stade Sébastien Charléty, Paris

27 May 2000

France	47–5	Japan

Stade Sébastien Charléty, Paris

27 May 2000

Ireland	40–14	Japan

Stade Sébastien Charléty, Paris

27 May 2000

Fiji	35–14	France

Stade Sébastien Charléty, Paris

Source: World Rugby

=== Pool B ===
Pos	Team	Pld	W	D	L	PF	PA	PD	Pts
1	New Zealand	3	3	0	0	115	31	84	9
2	Argentina	3	2	0	1	62	49	13	7
3	Morocco	3	1	0	2	55	64	-9	5
4	United States	3	0	0	3	19	107	-88	3

Source: World Rugby

27 May 2000

New Zealand	28–19	Morocco

Stade Sébastien Charléty, Paris

27 May 2000

Argentina	26–7	United States

Stade Sébastien Charléty, Paris

27 May 2000

New Zealand	59–0	United States

Stade Sébastien Charléty, Paris

27 May 2000

Argentina	24–14	Morocco

Stade Sébastien Charléty, Paris

27 May 2000

Morocco	22–12	United States

Stade Sébastien Charléty, Paris

27 May 2000

New Zealand	28–12	Argentina

Stade Sébastien Charléty, Paris

Source: World Rugby

=== Pool C ===
Pos	Team	Pld	W	D	L	PF	PA	PD	Pts
1	Australia	3	3	0	0	122	19	103	9
2	Canada	3	2	0	1	50	60	-10	7
4	French Barbarians	3	1	0	2	39	73	-34	5
4	Scotland	3	0	0	3	36	95	-59	3

Source: World Rugby

27 May 2000

Australia	42–7	French Barbarians

Stade Sébastien Charléty, Paris

27 May 2000

Canada	33–10	Scotland

Stade Sébastien Charléty, Paris

27 May 2000

Australia	40–7	Scotland

Stade Sébastien Charléty, Paris

27 May 2000

Canada	12–10	French Barbarians

Stade Sébastien Charléty, Paris

27 May 2000

French Barbarians	22–19	Scotland

Stade Sébastien Charléty, Paris

27 May 2000

Australia	40–5	Canada

Stade Sébastien Charléty, Paris

Source: World Rugby

=== Pool D ===
Pos	Team	Pld	W	D	L	PF	PA	PD	Pts
1	South Africa	3	3	0	0	85	19	66	9
2	England	3	2	0	1	58	54	4	7
3	Samoa	3	1	0	2	45	41	4	5
4	Georgia	3	0	0	3	33	107	-74	3

Source: World Rugby

27 May 2000

Samoa	31–14	Georgia

Stade Sébastien Charléty, Paris

27 May 2000

South Africa	28–12	England

Stade Sébastien Charléty, Paris

27 May 2000

England	15–7	Samoa

Stade Sébastien Charléty, Paris

27 May 2000

South Africa	45–0	Georgia

Stade Sébastien Charléty, Paris

27 May 2000

England	31–19	Georgia

Stade Sébastien Charléty, Paris

27 May 2000

South Africa	12–7	Samoa

Stade Sébastien Charléty, Paris

Source: World Rugby

== Knockout stage ==
=== Bowl ===
Quarter-finals
28 May 2000 – Stade Sébastien Charléty
Samoa	21
Scotland	12
28 May 2000 – Stade Sébastien Charléty
Ireland	17
United States	7
28 May 2000 – Stade Sébastien Charléty
Morocco	21
Japan	10
28 May 2000 – Stade Sébastien Charléty
French Barbarians	24
Georgia	14

Semi-finals
28 May 2000 – Stade Sébastien Charléty
Samoa	24
Ireland	5
28 May 2000 – Stade Sébastien Charléty
Morocco	17
French Barbarians	12

Final
28 May 2000 – Stade Sébastien Charléty
Samoa	37
Morocco	5

Source: World Rugby

=== Plate ===
Semi-finals
28 May 2000 – Stade Sébastien Charléty
Fiji	21
Canada	12
28 May 2000 – Stade Sébastien Charléty
France	31
England	12

Final
28 May 2000 – Stade Sébastien Charléty
Fiji	45
France	7

Source: World Rugby

=== Cup ===
Quarter-finals
28 May 2000 – Stade Sébastien Charléty
Argentina	35
Fiji	21
28 May 2000 – Stade Sébastien Charléty
South Africa	24
Canada	7
28 May 2000 – Stade Sébastien Charléty
New Zealand	19
France	0
28 May 2000 – Stade Sébastien Charléty
Australia	26
England	21

Semi-finals
28 May 2000 – Stade Sébastien Charléty
Argentina	14
South Africa	19
28 May 2000 – Stade Sébastien Charléty
New Zealand	26
Australia	7

Final
28 May 2000 – Stade Sébastien Charléty
South Africa	10
New Zealand	69

Source: World Rugby

== Tournament placings ==
Place	Team	Points
1st place, gold medalist(s)	New Zealand	20
2nd place, silver medalist(s)	South Africa	16
3rd place, bronze medalist(s)	Argentina	12
3rd place, bronze medalist(s)	Australia	12
5	Fiji	8
6	France	6
7	Canada	4
7	England	4

Place	Team	Points
9	Samoa	2
10	Morocco	0
11	French Barbarians	0
11	Ireland	0
13	Georgia	0
13	Japan	0
13	Scotland	0
13	United States	0

Source: Rugby7.com

== Series standings ==
At the completion of Round 10:

Pos.	Event Team	Dubai	Stellenbosch	Punta del Este	Mar del Plata	Wellington	Suva	Brisbane	Hong Kong	Tokyo	Paris	Points total
1	New Zealand	20	16	20	16	16	20	12	30	16	20	186
2	Fiji	16	20	16	20	20	16	20	24	20	8	180
3	Australia	8	8	8	12	12	12	16	18	12	12	118
4	Samoa	12	6	12	12	12	12	4	8	2	2	82
5	South Africa	12	12	12	4	6	6	0 ^{a}	8	4	16	80
6	Canada	4	4	6	6	8	4	4	8	12	4	60
7	Argentina	—	0	4	8	4	8	8	8	—	12	52
8	France	6	0	2	4	2	0	6	4	4	6	34
9	England	—	—	—	—	—	—	—	18	—	4	22
10	Georgia	0	12	—	—	—	—	—	—	—	0	12
11	Tonga	4	2	—	—	4	0	2	—	—	—	12
12	Japan	0	0	—	—	0	0	0	0	8	0	8
13	Papua New Guinea	—	—	—	—	0	2	0	—	6	—	8
14	Uruguay	—	0	4	0	0	4	0	—	—	—	8
15	Morocco	0	4	—	—	—	—	—	—	—	0	4
16	Scotland	2	—	—	—	—	—	—	0	—	0	2
16	Spain	—	—	0	2	—	—	—	—	—	—	2
18	United States	0	—	0	0	0	0	0	0	0	0	0
19	Hong Kong	0	—	—	—	0	—	0	0	0	—	0
20	Cook Islands	—	—	—	—	0	0	0	—	—	—	0
20	Croatia	—	—	—	—	0	0	—	0	—	—	0
22	Brazil	—	—	0	0	—	—	—	—	—	—	0
22	Chile	—	—	0	0	—	—	—	—	—	—	0
22	China	—	—	—	—	—	—	0	0	—	—	0
22	Chinese Taipei	—	—	—	—	—	—	—	0	0	—	0
22	Germany	—	—	0	0	—	—	—	—	—	—	0
22	Ireland	—	—	—	—	—	—	—	0	—	0	0
22	Kenya	0	0	—	—	—	—	—	—	—	—	0
22	Malaysia	—	—	—	—	—	—	—	0	0	—	0
22	Paraguay	—	—	0	0	—	—	—	—	—	—	0
22	Peru	—	—	0	0	—	—	—	—	—	—	0
22	Singapore	—	—	—	—	—	—	—	0	0	—	0
22	South Korea	—	—	—	—	—	—	—	0	0	—	0
22	Sri Lanka	—	—	—	—	—	—	—	0	0	—	0
22	Zimbabwe	0	0	—	—	—	—	—	—	—	—	0
36	(Cooperation Council for the Arab States of the Gulf) Arabian Gulf	—	—	—	—	—	—	—	0	—	—	0
36	French Barbarians	—	—	—	—	—	—	—	—	—	0	0
36	Italy	—	—	—	—	—	—	—	0	—	—	0
36	Namibia	—	0	—	—	—	—	—	—	—	—	0
36	Thailand	—	—	—	—	—	—	—	0	—	—	0
36	Vanuatu	—	—	—	—	—	0	—	—	—	—	0

Source: Rugby7.com

^a South Africa reached the semifinal stage of the Brisbane Sevens but was stripped of all points for the tournament due to fielding ineligible players.

IRB Sevens I
Preceded by 2000 Japan Sevens	2000 Paris Sevens	Succeeded by None (last event)
France Sevens
Preceded by 1999 Paris Sevens	2000 Paris Sevens	Succeeded by 2004 Bordeaux Sevens
