= 2000 Fiji Sevens =

- IRB Sevens I
- Host nation: Fiji
- Date: 11–12 February 2000

Cup
- Champion: New Zealand
- Runner-up: Fiji

Plate
- Winner: Argentina
- Runner-up: South Africa

Bowl
- Winner: Papua New Guinea
- Runner-up: Tonga

Tournament details
- Matches played: 41

The 2000 Fiji Sevens was a rugby sevens tournament held in Fiji as part of the inaugural IRB Sevens World Series. It was the eighth and final edition of the Fiji International Sevens and, in the wake of the Fijian coup d'état later that year, remains the only Fijian event so far included on the World Sevens circuit. The tournament was the sixth leg of the 1999-2000 Series.

The competition took place on 11 and 12 February at the National Stadium in Suva. Hosts, Fiji, were defeated 31-5 in the final by New Zealand, who claimed their third title of the series.

== Teams ==
Sixteen national teams played in the tournament:

- Argentina
- Australia
- Canada
- Cook Islands
- Croatia
- Fiji
- France
- Japan
- New Zealand
- Papua New Guinea
- Samoa
- South Africa
- Tonga
- United States
- Uruguay
- Vanuatu

== Pool stage ==
The pool stage was played on the first day of the tournament. The 16 teams were separated into four pools of four teams and teams in the same pool played each other once. The top two teams in each pool advanced to the Cup quarterfinals to compete for the 2000 Fiji Sevens title.

Key to colours in group tables
Teams that advanced to the Cup quarterfinals
Teams that advanced to the Bowl quarterfinals

=== Pool A ===
Pos	Team	Pld	W	D	L	PF	PA	PD	Pts
1	Fiji	3	3	0	0	132	14	+118	9
2	Uruguay	3	2	0	1	45	54	-9	7
3	France	3	1	0	2	54	62	−8	5
4	United States	3	0	0	3	12	113	−101	3

Source: World Rugby

11 February 2000

Fiji	47–7	United States

National Stadium, Suva

11 February 2000

Uruguay	19–7	France

National Stadium, Suva

11 February 2000

Fiji	47–0	Uruguay

National Stadium, Suva

11 February 2000

France	40–5	United States

National Stadium, Suva

11 February 2000

Uruguay	26–0	United States

National Stadium, Suva

11 February 2000

Fiji	38–7	France

National Stadium, Suva

Source: World Rugby

=== Pool B ===
Pos	Team	Pld	W	D	L	PF	PA	PD	Pts
1	New Zealand	3	3	0	0	85	12	+73	9
2	Argentina	3	2	0	1	71	57	+14	7
3	Papua New Guinea	3	1	0	2	49	78	−29	5
4	Croatia	3	0	0	3	35	92	−58	3

Source: World Rugby

11 February 2000

Croatia	0–38	New Zealand

National Stadium, Suva

11 February 2000

Argentina	33–21	Papua New Guinea

National Stadium, Suva

11 February 2000

Croatia	17–28	Papua New Guinea

National Stadium, Suva

11 February 2000

New Zealand	19–12	Argentina

National Stadium, Suva

11 February 2000

Croatia	17–26	Argentina

National Stadium, Suva

11 February 2000

New Zealand	28–0	Papua New Guinea

National Stadium, Suva

Source: World Rugby

=== Pool C ===
Pos	Team	Pld	W	D	L	PF	PA	PD	Pts
1	Samoa	3	2	1	0	51	34	+17	8
2	Canada	3	2	0	1	52	37	+15	7
3	Japan	3	0	2	1	29	45	−16	5
4	Tonga	3	0	1	2	34	50	−16	4

Source: World Rugby

11 February 2000

Samoa	12–12	Japan

National Stadium, Suva

11 February 2000

Canada	21–10	Tonga

National Stadium, Suva

11 February 2000

Samoa	17–12	Tonga

National Stadium, Suva

11 February 2000

Canada	21–5	Japan

National Stadium, Suva

11 February 2000

Japan	12–12	Tonga

National Stadium, Suva

11 February 2000

Samoa	22–10	Canada

National Stadium, Suva

Source: World Rugby

=== Pool D ===
Pos	Team	Pld	W	D	L	PF	PA	PD	Pts
1	Australia	3	3	0	0	94	5	+89	9
2	South Africa	3	2	0	1	61	33	+28	7
3	Cook Islands	3	1	0	2	47	47	0	5
4	Vanuatu	3	0	0	3	0	117	−117	3

Source: World Rugby

11 February 2000

Australia	21–5	Cook Islands

National Stadium, Suva

11 February 2000

South Africa	35–0	Vanuatu

National Stadium, Suva

11 February 2000

Australia	47–0	Vanuatu

National Stadium, Suva

11 February 2000

South Africa	26–7	Cook Islands

National Stadium, Suva

11 February 2000

Cook Islands	35–0	Vanuatu

National Stadium, Suva

11 February 2000

Australia	26–0	South Africa

National Stadium, Suva

Source: World Rugby

== Finals ==
=== Bowl ===
Quarter-finals
12 February – National Stadium
France	33
Croatia	10
12 February – National Stadium
Tonga	22
Cook Islands	5
12 February – National Stadium
Japan	33
Vanuatu	12
12 February – National Stadium
Papua New Guinea	33
United States	5

Semi-finals
12 February – National Stadium
France	12
Tonga	14
12 February – National Stadium
Japan	7
Papua New Guinea	21

Final
12 February – National Stadium
Tonga	17
Papua New Guinea	19

Source: World Rugby

=== Plate ===
Semi-finals
12 February – National Stadium
Argentina	19
Canada	7
12 February – National Stadium
South Africa	19
Uruguay	14

Final
12 February – National Stadium
Argentina	17
South Africa	14

Source: World Rugby

=== Cup ===
Quarter-finals
12 February – National Stadium
Fiji	28
Argentina	12
12 February – National Stadium
Australia	14
Canada	7
12 February – National Stadium
Samoa	28
South Africa	21
12 February – National Stadium
New Zealand	49
Uruguay	0

Semi-finals
12 February – National Stadium
Fiji	26
Australia	12
12 February – National Stadium
Samoa	0
New Zealand	45

Final
12 February – National Stadium
Fiji	5
New Zealand	31

Source: World Rugby

== Tournament placings ==
Place	Team	Points
1st place, gold medalist(s)	New Zealand	20
2nd place, silver medalist(s)	Fiji	16
3rd place, bronze medalist(s)	Australia	12
3rd place, bronze medalist(s)	Samoa	12
5	Argentina	8
6	South Africa	6
7	Canada	4
7	Uruguay	4

Place	Team	Points
9	Papua New Guinea	2
10	Tonga	0
11	France	0
11	Japan	0
13	Cook Islands	0
13	Croatia	0
13	United States	0
13	Vanuatu	0

Source: Rugby7.com

== Series standings ==
At the completion of Round 6:

Pos.	Event Team	Dubai	Stellenbosch	Punta del Este	Mar del Plata	Wellington	Suva	Brisbane	Hong Kong	Tokyo	Paris	Points total
1	Fiji	16	20	16	20	20	16					108
1	New Zealand	20	16	20	16	16	20					108
3	Samoa	12	6	12	12	12	12					66
4	Australia	8	8	8	12	12	12					60
5	South Africa	12	12	12	4	6	6					52
6	Canada	4	4	6	6	8	4					32
7	Argentina	—	0	4	8	4	8					24
8	France	6	0	2	4	2	0					14
9	Georgia	0	12	—	—	—	—					12
10	Tonga	4	2	—	—	4	0					10
11	Uruguay	—	0	4	0	0	4					8
12	Morocco	0	4	—	—	—	—					4
13	Papua New Guinea	—	—	—	—	0	2					2
13	Scotland	2	—	—	—	—	—					2
13	Spain	—	—	0	2	—	—					2
15	United States	0	—	0	0	0	0					0
16	Japan	0	0	—	—	0	0					0
17	Brazil	—	—	0	0	—	—					0
17	Chile	—	—	0	0	—	—					0
17	Cook Islands	—	—	—	—	0	0					0
17	Croatia	—	—	—	—	0	0					0
17	Germany	—	—	0	0	—	—					0
17	Hong Kong	0	—	—	—	0	—					0
17	Kenya	0	0	—	—	—	—					0
17	Paraguay	—	—	0	0	—	—					0
17	Peru	—	—	0	0	—	—					0
17	Zimbabwe	0	0	—	—	—	—					0
27	Namibia	—	0	—	—	—	—					0
27	Vanuatu	—	—	—	—	—	0					0

Source: Rugby7.com

IRB Sevens I
Preceded by 2000 Wellington Sevens	2000 Fiji Sevens	Succeeded by 2000 Brisbane Sevens
