= 1999–2000 World Sevens Series =

1999–2000 IRB Sevens
- Series I
- Hosts: United Arab Emirates; South Africa; Uruguay; Argentina; New Zealand; Fiji; Australia; Hong Kong; Japan; France
- Date: 2 December 1999 – 28 May 2000

Final positions
- Champions: New Zealand
- Runners-up: Fiji
- Third: Australia

The 1999–2000 World Sevens Series was the first season of the global circuit for men's national rugby sevens teams, organised by the International Rugby Board (now known as World Rugby). The series ran from December 1999 to May 2000 and incorporated ten tournaments spread over five continents. New Zealand was the series champion, winning five of the tournament events. Fiji finished as runner-up, eight points behind despite winning the remaining five tournaments. The leading try-scorer for the inaugural season was Fiji's Vilimoni Delasau, who notched 83 tries over the series.

== Schedule ==
The official schedule of ten events was announced by the International Rugby Board (IRB) on 2 December 1999. Prominent existing sevens tournaments were included in the new series, for the most part. The New Zealand and South Africa tournaments, however, were hosted as full international sevens events by their respective unions for the first time. An eleventh tournament, to be held in England, was considered but this did not come to fruition and was left off the calendar.

The prestige of the Hong Kong Sevens was acknowledged by increasing the points scale awarded to teams at the tournament by an extra 50 per cent. This recognised the special status of the event organized by the Hong Kong Rugby Union, played over three days instead of two and incorporating 24 teams instead of the usual 16. The union had initially wanted the Hong Kong tournament to be the final stop of the tour, but this proposal had been rejected earlier by the IRB.

Leg	Venue	Dates	Winner
Dubai	Dubai Exiles Rugby Ground, Dubai	2–3 December 1999	New Zealand
South Africa	Danie Craven Stadium, Stellenbosch	10–11 December 1999	Fiji
Punta del Este	Estadio Domingo Burgueño, Punta del Este	7–8 January 2000	New Zealand
Mar del Plata	Estadio José María Minella, Mar del Plata	12–13 January 2000	Fiji
Wellington	Westpac Stadium, Wellington	4–5 February 2000	Fiji
Fiji	National Stadium, Suva	11–12 February 2000	New Zealand
Brisbane	Lang Park, Brisbane	18–19 February 2000	Fiji
Hong Kong	Hong Kong Stadium, Hong Kong	24–26 March 2000	New Zealand
Japan	Chichibunomiya Rugby Stadium, Tokyo	1–2 April 2000	Fiji
Paris	Stade Sébastien Charléty, Paris	27–28 May 2000	New Zealand

== Final standings ==
The points awarded to teams at each event, as well as the overall season totals, are shown in the table below. Gold indicates the event champions. Silver indicates the event runner-ups. A zero (0) is recorded in the event column where a team played in a tournament but did not gain any points, however excludes teams that did not accumulate any points overall. A dash (—) is recorded in the event column if a team did not compete at a tournament.

1999–2000 IRB Sevens – Series I
Pos.	Event Team	Dubai	Stellenbosch	Punta del Este	Mar del Plata	Wellington	Suva	Brisbane	Hong Kong	Tokyo	Paris	Points total
1	New Zealand	20	16	20	16	16	20	12	30	16	20	186
2	Fiji	16	20	16	20	20	16	20	24	20	8	180
3	Australia	8	8	8	12	12	12	16	18	12	12	118
4	Samoa	12	6	12	12	12	12	4	8	2	2	82
5	South Africa	12	12	12	4	6	6	~~12~~ (Note: South Africa reached the semi-final stage of the Brisbane Sevens but was stripped of all points for the tournament due to fielding ineligible players.)	8	4	16	80
6	Canada	4	4	6	6	8	4	4	8	12	4	60
7	Argentina	–	0	4	8	4	8	8	8	—	12	52
8	France	6	0	2	4	2	0	6	4	4	6	34
9	England	—	—	—	—	—	—	—	18	—	4	22
10	Tonga	4	2	—	—	4	0	2	—	—	—	12
10	Georgia	0	12	—	—	—	—	—	—	—	0	12
12	Papua New Guinea	—	—	—	—	0	2	0	—	6	—	8
12	Uruguay	—	0	4	0	0	4	0	—	—	—	8
12	Japan	0	0	—	—	0	0	0	0	8	0	8
15	Morocco	0	4	—	—	—	—	—	—	—	0	4
16	Spain	—	—	0	2	—	—	—	—	—	—	2
16	Scotland	2	—	—	—	—	—	—	0	—	0	2
18	United States	0	—	0	0	0	0	0	0	0	0	0
19	Hong Kong	0	—	—	—	0	—	0	0	0	—	0
20	Cook Islands	—	—	—	—	0	0	0	—	—	—	0
20	Croatia	—	—	—	—	0	0	—	0	—	—	0
22	Brazil	—	—	0	0	—	—	—	—	—	—	0
22	Chile	—	—	0	0	—	—	—	—	—	—	0
22	China	—	—	—	—	—	—	0	0	—	—	0
22	Chinese Taipei	—	—	—	—	—	—	—	0	0	—	0
22	Germany	—	—	0	0	—	—	—	—	—	—	0
22	Ireland	—	—	—	—	—	—	—	0	—	0	0
22	Kenya	0	0	—	—	—	—	—	—	—	—	0
22	Malaysia	—	—	—	—	—	—	—	0	0	—	0
22	Paraguay	—	—	0	0	—	—	—	—	—	—	0
22	Peru	—	—	0	0	—	—	—	—	—	—	0
22	Singapore	—	—	—	—	—	—	—	0	0	—	0
22	South Korea	—	—	—	—	—	—	—	0	0	—	0
22	Sri Lanka	—	—	—	—	—	—	—	0	0	—	0
22	Zimbabwe	0	0	—	—	—	—	—	—	—	—	0
36	(Cooperation Council for the Arab States of the Gulf) Arabian Gulf	—	—	—	—	—	—	—	0	—	—	0
36	French Barbarians	—	—	—	—	—	—	—	—	—	0	0
36	Italy	—	—	—	—	—	—	—	0	—	—	0
36	Namibia	—	0	—	—	—	—	—	—	—	—	0
36	Thailand	—	—	—	—	—	—	—	0	—	—	0
36	Vanuatu	—	—	—	—	—	0	—	—	—	—	0

Source: World Rugby (archived)

Legend
Gold	Event Champions
Silver	Event Runner-ups

Notes

== Tournaments ==
=== Dubai ===
The opening tournament of the brand new series saw the teams head over to Dubai with the three day event starting on the Wednesday with the international tournament being played on the Thursday and Friday. In the cup final, it was New Zealand that took out the cup final defeating Fiji by 24 points with Australia and Scotland taking out the plate and bowl respectively.

Event	Winners	Score	Finalists	Semi-finalists
Cup	New Zealand	38–14	Fiji	South Africa; Samoa
Plate	Australia	33–20	France	Tonga; Canada
Bowl	Scotland	31–24	Zimbabwe	Kenya; United States

=== South Africa ===
Event	Winners	Score	Finalists	Semi-finalists
Cup	Fiji	12–10	New Zealand	Georgia; South Africa
Plate	Australia	22–19	Samoa	Canada; Morocco
Bowl	Tonga	31–26	Argentina	Uruguay; Namibia

=== Punta del Este ===
Event	Winners	Score	Finalists	Semi-finalists
Cup	New Zealand	42–19	Fiji	South Africa; Samoa
Plate	Australia	27–12	Canada	Uruguay; Argentina
Bowl	France	31–12	Germany	Chile; Spain

=== Mar del Plata ===
Event	Winners	Score	Finalists	Semi-finalists
Cup	Fiji	26–14	New Zealand	Samoa; Australia
Plate	Argentina	41–7	Canada	France; South Africa
Bowl	Spain	40–7	Chile	United States; Germany

=== Wellington ===
Event	Winners	Score	Finalists	Semi-finalists
Cup	Fiji	24–14	New Zealand	Samoa; Australia
Plate	Canada	24–21	South Africa	Argentina; Tonga
Bowl	France	47–12	Croatia	Japan; Papua New Guinea

=== Fiji ===
Event	Winners	Score	Finalists	Semi-finalists
Cup	New Zealand	31–5	Fiji	Samoa; Australia
Plate	Argentina	17–14	South Africa	Canada; Uruguay
Bowl	Papua New Guinea	21–17	Tonga	Japan; France

=== Australia ===
Event	Winners	Score	Finalists	Semi-finalists
Cup	Fiji	24–21	Australia	South Africa; New Zealand
Plate	Argentina	33–14	France	Samoa; Canada
Bowl	Tonga	43–0	Papua New Guinea	Hong Kong; Uruguay

=== Hong Kong ===
Event	Winners	Score	Finalists	Semi-finalists	Quarter-finalists
Cup	New Zealand	31–5	Fiji	Australia; England	Argentina; Canada; Samoa; South Africa
Plate	France	19–14	Croatia	Italy; Hong Kong	Scotland; South Korea; United States; Japan
Bowl	Ireland	59–7	China	Thailand (Cooperation Council for the Arab States of the Gulf) Arabian Gulf	Chinese Taipei; Malaysia; Sri Lanka; Singapore

=== Japan ===
Event	Winners	Score	Finalists	Semi-finalists
Cup	Fiji	27–22	New Zealand	Canada; Australia
Plate	Japan	26–14	Papua New Guinea	France; South Africa
Bowl	Samoa	19–12	South Korea	Hong Kong; United States

=== France ===
Event	Winners	Score	Finalists	Semi-finalists
Cup	New Zealand	69–10	South Africa	Australia; Argentina
Plate	Fiji	45–7	France	Canada; England
Bowl	Samoa	37–5	Morocco	Ireland; French Barbarians

== Sources ==
- Burgess, Michael (17 January 2008). "History of the IRB Sevens". TVNZ. Archived from the original on 11 October 2012.
