= 2016 men's rugby sevens final Olympic qualification tournament =

- Hosts: Monaco
- Date: 18–19 June 2016
- Nations: 16

Final positions
- Champions: Spain
- Runners-up: Samoa
- Third: Russia

The final 2016 men's Olympic qualification tournament for rugby sevens at the 2016 Summer Olympics was held on 18 and 19 June 2016 at Stade Louis II in Fontvieille, Monaco. The tournament used a round-robin format.

The qualification tournament was won by Spain; as a result, they qualified for the 2016 Olympics.

== Teams ==
Means of qualification	Completed date	Venue	Berths	Qualified
2015 CONSUR Sevens	7 June 2015	(Argentina) Santa Fe	2	Chile
2015 CONSUR Sevens	7 June 2015	(Argentina) Santa Fe	2	Uruguay
2015 NACRA Sevens	14 June 2015	(United States) Cary	2	Canada
2015 NACRA Sevens	14 June 2015	(United States) Cary	2	Mexico
2015 Rugby Europe Sevens Grand Prix Series	12 July 2015	Various	1	Spain
2015 Rugby Europe Sevens Olympic Repechage Tournament	19 July 2015	(Portugal) Lisbon	3	Germany
2015 Rugby Europe Sevens Olympic Repechage Tournament	19 July 2015	(Portugal) Lisbon	3	Ireland
2015 Rugby Europe Sevens Olympic Repechage Tournament	19 July 2015	(Portugal) Lisbon	3	Russia
2015 ARFU Men's Sevens Championships	8 November 2015	Hong Kong	3	Hong Kong
2015 ARFU Men's Sevens Championships	8 November 2015	Hong Kong	3	South Korea
2015 ARFU Men's Sevens Championships	8 November 2015	Hong Kong	3	Sri Lanka
2015 Oceania Sevens Championship	15 November 2015	(New Zealand) Auckland	2	Samoa
2015 Oceania Sevens Championship	15 November 2015	(New Zealand) Auckland	2	Tonga
2015 Africa Cup Sevens	15 November 2015	(South Africa) Johannesburg	3	Morocco
2015 Africa Cup Sevens	15 November 2015	(South Africa) Johannesburg	3	Tunisia
2015 Africa Cup Sevens	15 November 2015	(South Africa) Johannesburg	3	Zimbabwe
Total			16	

== Format ==
The teams are drawn into four pools, each containing four teams.

- The top two teams in each pool advance to the Cup stage. The team that wins the Cup qualifies for the Olympic Games.
  - The losers of the Cup quarter-finals play off for the Plate .
- The bottom two teams in each pool go into the Bowl.
  - The losers of the Bowl quarter-finals play off for the Shield.

== Pool stage ==
=== Pool A ===
Teams	Pld	W	D	L	PF	PA	+/−	Pts
Ireland	3	3	0	0	82	45	+37	9
Samoa	3	2	0	1	68	34	+34	7
Zimbabwe	3	1	0	2	40	59	–19	5
Tonga	3	0	0	3	26	78	–52	3

Matches

18 June 2016
11:00

Samoa	26–0	Tonga

18 June 2016
11:22

Zimbabwe	12–24	Ireland

18 June 2016
14:15

Samoa	21–27	Ireland

18 June 2016
14:34

Zimbabwe	21–14	Tonga

18 June 2016
17:30

Tonga	12–31	Ireland

18 June 2016
17:52

Samoa	21–7	Zimbabwe

=== Pool B ===
Teams	Pld	W	D	L	PF	PA	+/−	Pts
Germany	3	3	0	0	85	38	+47	9
Canada	3	2	0	1	109	21	+88	7
Uruguay	3	1	0	2	54	69	–15	5
Sri Lanka	3	0	0	3	19	139	–120	3

Matches

18 June 2016
11:44

Canada	33–0	Uruguay

18 June 2016
12:06

Germany	42–5	Sri Lanka

18 June 2016
14:59

Canada	57–0	Sri Lanka

18 June 2016
15:21

Germany	22–14	Uruguay

18 June 2016
18:14

Uruguay	40–14	Sri Lanka

18 June 2016
18:36

Canada	19–21	Germany

=== Pool C ===
Teams	Pld	W	D	L	PF	PA	+/−	Pts
Russia	3	3	0	0	76	31	+45	9
Chile	3	2	0	1	52	50	+2	7
Morocco	3	1	0	2	50	73	–23	5
Tunisia	3	0	0	3	38	62	–24	3

Matches

18 June 2016
12:28

Russia	26–19	Morocco

18 June 2016
12:50

Chile	19–12	Tunisia

18 June 2016
15:43

Russia	24–12	Tunisia

18 June 2016
16:05

Chile	33–12	Morocco

18 June 2016
18:56

Morocco	19–14	Tunisia

18 June 2016
19:20

Russia	26–0	Chile

=== Pool D ===
Teams	Pld	W	D	L	PF	PA	+/−	Pts
Hong Kong	3	3	0	0	64	17	+47	9
Spain	3	2	0	1	54	31	+23	7
South Korea	3	1	0	2	56	57	–1	5
Mexico	3	0	0	3	27	96	–69	3

Matches

18 June 2016
13:12

Hong Kong	26–10	Mexico

18 June 2016
13:34

Spain	26–7	South Korea

18 June 2016
16:27

Hong Kong	19–7	South Korea

18 June 2016
16:49

Spain	28–5	Mexico

18 June 2016
19:42

Mexico	12–42	South Korea

18 June 2016
20:04

Hong Kong	19–0	Spain

== Knockout stage ==
=== Shield ===
Semi-finals
Mexico	19
Sri Lanka	22
South Korea	33
Tunisia	19

Final
Sri Lanka	24
South Korea	31

=== Bowl ===
Quarter-finals
Zimbabwe	19
Mexico	10
Morocco	33
Sri Lanka	14
South Korea	7
Tonga	41
Uruguay	22
Tunisia	5

Semi-finals
Zimbabwe	26
Morocco	19
Tonga	33
Uruguay	12

Final
Zimbabwe	31
Tonga	5

=== Plate ===
Semi-finals
Ireland	19
Canada	24
Hong Kong	24
Chile	5

Final
Canada	24
Hong Kong	17

=== Cup ===
Quarter-finals
Ireland	7
Spain	12
Russia	14
Canada	12
Hong Kong	12
Samoa	31
Germany	26
Chile	0

Semi-finals
Spain	17
Russia	12
Samoa	26
Germany	14

Final
Spain	22
Samoa	19
Third place
Russia	22
Germany	12

== Overall ==
Pos	Team	Wn/Ls	Pts Dif	Pool
1	Spain	5–1	+36	D
2	Samoa	4–2	+62	A
3	Russia	5–1	+52	C
4	Germany	4–2	+50	B
5	Canada	4–2	+98	B
6	Hong Kong	4–2	+40	D
7	Ireland	3–2	+27	A
8	Chile	2–3	–43	C
