= Fiji Sevens =

- Sport: Rugby sevens
- First season: 1993
- No. of teams: 16
- Most recent champion: New Zealand (2000)

The Fiji Sevens, also known as the Suva Sevens, is an international rugby union sevens tournament held at the National Stadium in Suva, Fiji. It was a part of the Sevens World Series in 2000, but in the wake of the Fijian coup d'état later that year, the tournament was dropped from the World circuit for the following season.

== Results ==
Year	Venue	Cup final			Placings			Refs
		Winner	Score	Runner-up	Plate	Bowl	Shield	
1993	National Stadium Suva	Fiji	26–0	(Fiji); Suva	New Zealand	Canada	n/a	
1994	National Stadium Suva						n/a	
1995	National Stadium Suva						n/a	
1996	National Stadium Suva	Fiji	22–21	New Zealand	Hong Kong	Cook Islands	n/a	
1997	National Stadium Suva	Fiji	26–19	Western Samoa			n/a	
1998	National Stadium Suva	Fiji	28–19	(Australia); Australian Fijians			n/a	
1999	National Stadium Suva	Fiji	35–7	(Australia); Australian Fijians	(France); Froggies	Canada	n/a	
2000	National Stadium Suva	New Zealand	31–5	Fiji	Argentina	Papua New Guinea	n/a	

Key:
Blue border on the left indicates tournaments included in the World Rugby Sevens Series.

== See also ==
- Aftermath of the 2000 Fijian coup d'état
