= South Africa Sevens =

Rugby sevens tournament held in South Africa

- Most recent season or competition: 2024 South Africa Sevens
- Cape Town Sevens logo
- Sport: Rugby sevens
- First season: 1999–2000 (Stellenbosch Sevens)
- No. of teams: 12
- Most recent champion: South Africa (2024)
- Most titles: New Zealand (11 times)

The South Africa Sevens is an annual rugby sevens tournament that is held in South Africa. It is currently hosted in Cape Town and is part of the Sevens World Series run by World Rugby. A South African leg of the World series has been included in every edition of the competition since it began in the 1999–2000 season.

The tournament was first held at Stellenbosch in 1999 before being moved to Durban for the next two seasons. For nine seasons from 2002 until 2010 it was held at George in the Western Cape, before moving to Port Elizabeth for the 2011 edition, and Cape Town in 2015.

== Results ==
Year	Venue	Cup final			Placings		
		Winner	Score	Runner-up	Plate	Bowl	Shield
1999/00; Details	Danie Craven Stadium	Fiji	12–10	New Zealand	Australia	Tonga	n/a
2000/01; Details	ABSA Stadium	New Zealand	34–5	Fiji	South Africa	Portugal	n/a
2001/02; Details	ABSA Stadium	New Zealand	19–17	Samoa	Australia	Namibia	Kenya
2002/03; Details	Outeniqua Park	Fiji	24–14	New Zealand	Argentina	Namibia	Italy
2003/04; Details	Outeniqua Park	England	38–14	New Zealand	Argentina	Canada	Kenya
2004/05; Details	Outeniqua Park	New Zealand	33–19	Fiji	South Africa	Australia	Portugal
2005/06; Details	Outeniqua Park	Fiji	21–19	Argentina	Samoa	Wales	Canada
2006/07; Details	Outeniqua Park	New Zealand	24–19	South Africa	Wales	Australia	Portugal
2007/08; Details	Outeniqua Park	New Zealand	34–7	Fiji	Kenya	Wales	Canada
2008/09; Details	Outeniqua Park	South Africa	12–7	New Zealand	England	France	Zimbabwe
2009/10; Details	Outeniqua Park	New Zealand	21–12	Fiji	England	Wales	Scotland
2010/11; Details	Outeniqua Park	New Zealand	22–19	England	South Africa	Scotland	Zimbabwe
2011/12; Details	Nelson Mandela Bay Stadium	New Zealand	31–26	South Africa	Wales	Scotland	Zimbabwe
2012/13; Details	Nelson Mandela Bay Stadium	New Zealand	47–12	France	Wales	Australia	Spain
2013/14; Details	Nelson Mandela Bay Stadium	South Africa	17–14	New Zealand	Fiji	England	Scotland
2014/15; Details	Nelson Mandela Bay Stadium	South Africa	26–17	New Zealand	United States	Canada	Portugal
2015/16; Details	Cape Town Stadium	South Africa	29–14	Argentina	Fiji	Scotland	Samoa
		Winner	Score	Runner-up	Third	Fourth	Fifth
2016/17; Details	Cape Town Stadium	England	19–17	South Africa	New Zealand	Scotland	Fiji
2017/18; Details	Cape Town Stadium	New Zealand	38–14	Argentina	South Africa	Canada	Fiji
2018/19; Details	Cape Town Stadium	Fiji	29–15	United States	South Africa	New Zealand	England
2019/20; Details	Cape Town Stadium	New Zealand	7–5	South Africa	France	Fiji	Argentina
World Series tournaments planned for Cape Town were cancelled in 2020 and 2021, due to impacts of the COVID-19 pandemic.
2022/23 Details	DHL Stadium	Samoa	12–7	New Zealand	United States	South Africa	Fiji
2023/24 Details	DHL Stadium	Argentina	45–12	Australia	Fiji	Ireland	New Zealand
2024/25 Details	DHL Stadium	South Africa	26–14	France	Fiji	Spain	Argentina
2025/26 Details	DHL Stadium	South Africa	21–19	Argentina	Fiji	France	New Zealand

== See also ==
- South Africa Women's Sevens
