= 2000 Punta del Este Sevens =

- IRB Sevens I
- Host nation: Uruguay
- Date: 7–8 January 2000

Cup
- Champion: New Zealand
- Runner-up: Fiji

Plate
- Winner: Australia
- Runner-up: Canada

Bowl
- Winner: France
- Runner-up: Germany

Tournament details
- Matches played: 41

The 2000 Punta del Este Sevens was a Rugby Sevens tournament held in Punta del Este, Uruguay and was the third leg of the 1999-2000 World Sevens Series. The competition took place on 7 and 8 January at the Estadio Domingo Burgueño.

The hosts, Uruguay were eliminated in the Plate semi-finals. For the third consecutive event in the Series, the Cup final was contested between Fiji and New Zealand. The Punta del Este Sevens was not included on the World Sevens circuit for the 2000-01 series.

== Teams ==
Sixteen national teams played in the tournament with New Zealand and Fiji being seeded one and two due to winning the previous two tournaments in Dubai and Stellenbosch. Peru were debuting on the world stage after becoming a member of the International Rugby Board as they were invited to compete in Punta del Este and Mar del Plata.

- Argentina
- Australia
- Brazil
- Canada
- Chile
- Fiji
- France
- Germany
- New Zealand
- Paraguay
- Peru
- Samoa
- South Africa
- Spain
- United States
- Uruguay

== Format ==
The pool stage was played on the first day of the tournament. The 16 teams were separated into four pools of four teams and teams in the same pool played each other once. The top two teams in each pool advanced to the Cup quarterfinals to compete for the 2000 Punta del Este Sevens title.

== Summary ==
The first day of the Punta del Este Sevens saw three teams end the day unbeaten from their pool stages. In Pool A, it was New Zealand who had an handful of players playing rugby sevens for the first time finishing top with victories over Spain (50–5), Peru (63–0) and Uruguay (24–5). Joint-leaders in the series heading into the round, Fiji only conceded twelve points in their group to finish top of the group with Canada coming in second place. The other team that finished unbeaten throughout Day 1 was Argentina who just slightly edged over Samoa, 19–12 in the fifth game of Pool D to finish top of the pool. Pool C was the only group to not have an unbeaten team with Chile forcing an tiebreaker after defeating South Africa 28–21. But Chile was the unlucky team with the team being the lowest in point average off the three teams.

The second day of the tournament saw the first extra time match in the series history with South Africa defeating Argentina 24–19 in the cup quarter final after they initially were locked at 19-all during regulation. After recording victories over South Africa and Samoa in the semi-finals respectively, New Zealand and Fiji met in the third consecutive cup final. During the final, an injury to Fijian player Waisele Serevi occurred in the 14th minute of the final with the score at 21–19. The injury saw New Zealand score three more tries and go to the top of the table with a 42–19 victory. Australia won the plate final for the third consecutive event defeating Canada while France took out the bowl defeating Germany.

== Pool stage ==
Key to colours in group tables
Teams that advanced to the Cup quarterfinals
Teams that advanced to the Bowl quarterfinals

=== Pool A ===
Pos	Team	Pld	W	D	L	PF	PA	PD	Pts
1	New Zealand	3	3	0	0	137	10	+127	9
2	Uruguay	3	2	0	1	67	36	+31	7
3	Spain	3	1	0	2	48	81	−33	5
4	Peru	3	0	0	3	5	130	−125	3

Source: World Rugby

7 January
16:00

Uruguay	36–7	Peru

Estadio Domingo Burgueño, Punta del Este

7 January
16:20

New Zealand	50–5	Spain

Estadio Domingo Burgueño, Punta del Este

7 January
18:40

New Zealand	63–0	Peru

Estadio Domingo Burgueño, Punta del Este

7 January
19:00

Uruguay	26–12	Spain

Estadio Domingo Burgueño, Punta del Este

7 January
21:20

New Zealand	24–5	Uruguay

Estadio Domingo Burgueño, Punta del Este

7 January
22:00

Spain	31–5	Peru

Estadio Domingo Burgueño, Punta del Este

Source: World Rugby

=== Pool B ===
Pos	Team	Pld	W	D	L	PF	PA	PD	Pts
1	Fiji	3	3	0	0	148	12	+136	9
2	Canada	3	2	0	1	61	42	+19	7
3	France	3	1	0	2	47	68	−21	5
4	Paraguay	3	0	0	3	7	141	−134	3

Source: World Rugby

7 January
16:40

Fiji	42–12	Canada

Estadio Domingo Burgueño, Punta del Este

7 January
17:00

France	47–7	Paraguay

Estadio Domingo Burgueño, Punta del Este

7 January
19:20

Fiji	59–0	Paraguay

Estadio Domingo Burgueño, Punta del Este

7 January
19:40

Canada	14–0	France

Estadio Domingo Burgueño, Punta del Este

7 January
21:40

Fiji	47–0	France

Estadio Domingo Burgueño, Punta del Este

7 January
22:20

Canada	35–0	Paraguay

Estadio Domingo Burgueño, Punta del Este

Source: World Rugby

=== Pool C ===
Pos	Team	Pld	W	D	L	PF	PA	PD	Pts
1	Australia	3	2	0	1	92	31	+61	7
2	South Africa	3	2	0	1	98	52	+46	7
3	Chile	3	2	0	1	59	54	+5	7
4	Germany	3	0	0	3	17	129	−112	3

Source: World Rugby

7 January
17:20

Australia	26–5	Chile

Estadio Domingo Burgueño, Punta del Este

7 January
17:40

South Africa	56–5	Germany

Estadio Domingo Burgueño, Punta del Este

7 January
20:00

South Africa	21–19	Australia

Estadio Domingo Burgueño, Punta del Este

7 January
20:20

Chile	26–7	Germany

Estadio Domingo Burgueño, Punta del Este

7 January
22:40

Australia	47–5	Germany

Estadio Domingo Burgueño, Punta del Este

7 January
23:00

Chile	28–21	South Africa

Estadio Domingo Burgueño, Punta del Este

Source: World Rugby

=== Pool D ===
Pos	Team	Pld	W	D	L	PF	PA	PD	Pts
1	Argentina	3	3	0	0	107	22	+85	9
2	Samoa	3	2	0	1	80	33	+47	7
3	United States	3	1	0	2	43	71	−28	5
4	Brazil	3	0	0	3	19	123	−104	3

Source: World Rugby

7 January
18:00

Argentina	42–5	Brazil

Estadio Domingo Burgueño, Punta del Este

7 January
18:20

Samoa	25–0	United States

Estadio Domingo Burgueño, Punta del Este

7 January
20:40

Argentina	46–5	United States

Estadio Domingo Burgueño, Punta del Este

7 January
21:00

Samoa	43–14	Brazil

Estadio Domingo Burgueño, Punta del Este

7 January
23:20

Argentina	19–12	Samoa

Estadio Domingo Burgueño, Punta del Este

7 January
23:40

United States	38–0	Brazil

Estadio Domingo Burgueño, Punta del Este

Source: World Rugby

== Finals ==
=== Bowl ===
Quarter-finals
8 January – Estadio Domingo Burgueño
Spain	26
Paraguay	5
8 January – Estadio Domingo Burgueño
Germany	21
United States	12
8 January – Estadio Domingo Burgueño
Chile	29
Brazil	5
8 January – Estadio Domingo Burgueño
France	50
Peru	0

Semi-finals
8 January – Estadio Domingo Burgueño
Spain	12
Germany	26
8 January – Estadio Domingo Burgueño
Chile	10
France	14

Final
8 January – Estadio Domingo Burgueño
Germany	12
France	31

Source: World Rugby

=== Plate ===
Semi-finals
8 January – Estadio Domingo Burgueño
Uruguay	5
Australia	35
8 January – Estadio Domingo Burgueño
Canada	17
Argentina	12

Final
8 January – Estadio Domingo Burgueño
Australia	27
Canada	12

Source: World Rugby

=== Cup ===
Quarter-finals
8 January – Estadio Domingo Burgueño
Fiji	38
Uruguay	5
8 January – Estadio Domingo Burgueño
Samoa	12
Australia	7
8 January – Estadio Domingo Burgueño
New Zealand	33
Canada	0
8 January – Estadio Domingo Burgueño
South Africa	24 (a.e.t.)
Argentina	19

Semi-finals
8 January – Estadio Domingo Burgueño
Fiji	19
Samoa	7
8 January – Estadio Domingo Burgueño
New Zealand	31
South Africa	7

Final
8 January – Estadio Domingo Burgueño
Fiji	19
New Zealand	42

Source: World Rugby

== Tournament placings ==
Place	Team	Points
1st place, gold medalist(s)	New Zealand	20
2nd place, silver medalist(s)	Fiji	16
3rd place, bronze medalist(s)	Samoa	12
3rd place, bronze medalist(s)	South Africa	12
5	Australia	8
6	Canada	6
7	Argentina	4
7	Uruguay	4

Place	Team	Points
9	France	2
10	Germany	0
11	Chile	0
11	Spain	0
13	Brazil	0
13	Paraguay	0
13	Peru	0
13	United States	0

Source: Rugby7.com

IRB Sevens I
Preceded by 1999 South Africa Sevens	2000 Punta del Este Sevens	Succeeded by 2000 Mar del Plata Sevens
