= 2000 Mar del Plata Sevens =

- IRB Sevens I
- Host nation: Argentina
- Date: 12–13 January 2000

Cup
- Champion: Fiji
- Runner-up: New Zealand

Plate
- Winner: Argentina
- Runner-up: Canada

Bowl
- Winner: Spain
- Runner-up: Chile

Tournament details
- Matches played: 41

The 2000 Mar del Plata Sevens was a rugby sevens tournament that took place at the Estadio José María Minella in Mar del Plata between the 12–13 January 2000. It was the fourth edition of the Mar del Plata Sevens and was also the fourth round of the held in Argentina as the fourth round of the 1999–2000 World Sevens Series.

During the tournament, the first draw in the series history occurred when Samoa and Australia played out an 14-all draw in Pool D. In the cup final, Fiji took out their second cup final of the season defeating New Zealand 26-14. The hosts (Argentina) took out the plate while Spain won the bowl.

== Teams ==
Sixteen national teams played in the Mar Del Plata Sevens with the national teams being the same teams as in the previous round which was held in Punta del Este.

- Argentina
- Australia
- Brazil
- Canada
- Chile
- Fiji
- France
- Germany
- New Zealand
- Paraguay
- Peru
- Samoa
- Spain
- South Africa
- United States
- Uruguay

== Format ==
The pool stage was played on the first day of the tournament. The 16 teams were separated into four pools of four teams and teams in the same pool played each other once. The top two teams in each pool advanced to the Cup quarterfinals to compete for the 2000 Mar del Plata Sevens title.

== Summary ==
The opening day of the 2000 Mar del Plata sevens saw the first draw in the series history with Samoa and Australia recording a 14-all draw in the final match of the day. Earlier results though put Samoa top of Pool D by a single point over Australia. New Zealand continued their form in the series, conceding only seven points (against France) in the pool stage to finish top of Pool B with France joining them. Fiji finished top of Pool A with wins over Germany (56–5), Uruguay (61–7) and Canada (40–14) with Canada joining them in second place. The final pool saw South Africa finish top of the pool with hosts, Argentina coming in second place.

Day 2 saw a Fiji and New Zealand final for the fourth tournament in a row after both teams recorded victories in their quarters and semis to make it to the cup final. For Fiji they defeated France 47–7 before knocking off Samoa in the semi-finals 19–7. New Zealand recorded a victory over Canada in the quarter-finals before defeating first-time cup semi-finalists, Australia with Australian coach, Glen Ella stating, "It was good to finally break through". In the cup final, it was Fiji who defeated New Zealand to tie the series after four rounds after coming back from 14–0 down to win 26–14. Hosts, Argentina won the plate final while Spain won the bowl defeating Chile.

== Pool stages ==
Key to colours in group tables
Teams that advanced to the Cup quarterfinals
Teams that advanced to the Bowl quarterfinals

=== Pool A ===
Pos	Team	Pld	W	D	L	PF	PA	PD	Pts
1	Fiji	3	3	0	0	157	26	+131	9
2	Canada	3	2	0	1	80	64	+16	7
3	Germany	3	1	0	2	19	96	−77	5
4	Uruguay	3	0	0	3	24	94	−70	3

Source: World Rugby

12 January 2000
15:30

Germany	7–0	Uruguay

Estadio José María Minella, Mar del Plata

12 January 2000
16:50

Canada	26–17	Uruguay

Estadio José María Minella, Mar del Plata

12 January 2000
18:10

Fiji	56–5	Germany

Estadio José María Minella, Mar del Plata

12 January 2000
19:30

Fiji	61–7	Uruguay

Estadio José María Minella, Mar del Plata

12 January 2000
20:50

Canada	40–7	Germany

Estadio José María Minella, Mar del Plata

12 January 2000
22:20

Fiji	40–14	Canada

Estadio José María Minella, Mar del Plata

Source: World Rugby

=== Pool B ===
Pos	Team	Pld	W	D	L	PF	PA	PD	Pts
1	New Zealand	3	3	0	0	114	7	+107	9
2	France	3	2	0	1	98	21	+77	7
3	United States	3	1	0	2	17	83	−66	5
4	Peru	3	0	0	3	10	128	−118	3

Source: World Rugby

12 January 2000
15:50

United States	17–10	Peru

Estadio José María Minella, Mar del Plata

12 January 2000
17:10

France	33–0	United States

Estadio José María Minella, Mar del Plata

12 January 2000
18:30

New Zealand	53–0	Peru

Estadio José María Minella, Mar del Plata

12 January 2000
19:50

New Zealand	40–0	United States

Estadio José María Minella, Mar del Plata

12 January 2000
21:10

France	58–0	Peru

Estadio José María Minella, Mar del Plata

12 January 2000
22:40

New Zealand	21–7	France

Estadio José María Minella, Mar del Plata

Source: World Rugby

=== Pool C ===
Pos	Team	Pld	W	D	L	PF	PA	PD	Pts
1	South Africa	3	3	0	0	106	24	+82	9
2	Argentina	3	2	0	1	101	21	+80	7
3	Spain	3	1	0	2	36	90	−54	5
4	Brazil	3	0	0	3	12	120	−108	3

Source: World Rugby

12 January 2000
16:10

Spain	29–0	Brazil

Estadio José María Minella, Mar del Plata

12 January 2000
17:30

South Africa	38–12	Brazil

Estadio José María Minella, Mar del Plata

12 January 2000
18:50

Argentina	36–7	Spain

Estadio José María Minella, Mar del Plata

12 January 2000
20:10

South Africa	54–0	Spain

Estadio José María Minella, Mar del Plata

12 January 2000
21:40

South Africa	14–12	Argentina

Estadio José María Minella, Mar del Plata

12 January 2000
23:00

Argentina	53–0	Brazil

Estadio José María Minella, Mar del Plata

Source: World Rugby

=== Pool D ===
Pos	Team	Pld	W	D	L	PF	PA	PD	Pts
1	Samoa	3	2	1	0	98	28	+70	8
2	Australia	3	2	1	0	83	14	+69	8
3	Chile	3	1	0	2	45	94	−49	5
4	Paraguay	3	0	0	3	26	116	−90	3

Source: World Rugby

12 January 2000
16:30

Chile	38–19	Paraguay

Estadio José María Minella, Mar del Plata

12 January 2000
17:50

Australia	33–0	Chile

Estadio José María Minella, Mar del Plata

12 January 2000
19:10

Samoa	42–7	Paraguay

Estadio José María Minella, Mar del Plata

12 January 2000
20:30

Samoa	42–7	Chile

Estadio José María Minella, Mar del Plata

12 January 2000
22:00

Australia	36–0	Paraguay

Estadio José María Minella, Mar del Plata

12 January 2000
23:20

Samoa	14–14	Australia

Estadio José María Minella, Mar del Plata

Source: World Rugby

== Finals ==
=== Bowl ===
Quarter-finals
13 January – Estadio José María Minella
Germany	12
Peru	7
13 January – Mar del Plata
Chile	31
Brazil	5
13 January – Estadio José María Minella
Spain	20
Paraguay	12
13 January – Estadio José María Minella
United States	21
Uruguay	15

Semi-finals
13 January – Estadio José María Minella
Germany	12
Chile	42
13 January – Estadio José María Minella
Spain	14
United States	7

Final
13 January – Estadio José María Minella
Chile	7
Spain	38

Source: World Rugby

=== Plate ===
Semi-finals
13 January – Estadio José María Minella
France	12
Argentina	28
13 January – Estadio José María Minella
South Africa	17
Canada	35

Final
13 January – Estadio José María Minella
Argentina	26
Canada	14

Source: World Rugby

=== Cup ===
Quarter-finals
13 January – Estadio José María Minella
Fiji	47
France	7
13 January – Estadio José María Minella
Samoa	10
Argentina	5
13 January – Estadio José María Minella
Australia	22
South Africa	5
13 January – Estadio José María Minella
New Zealand	43
Canada	7

Semi-finals
13 January – Estadio José María Minella
Fiji	28
Samoa	12
13 January – Estadio José María Minella
Australia	5
New Zealand	26

Final
13 January – Estadio José María Minella
Fiji	26
New Zealand	14

Source: World Rugby

== Tournament placings ==
Place	Team	Points
1st place, gold medalist(s)	Fiji	20
2nd place, silver medalist(s)	New Zealand	16
3rd place, bronze medalist(s)	Australia	12
3rd place, bronze medalist(s)	Samoa	12
5	Argentina	8
6	Canada	6
7	France	4
7	South Africa	4

Place	Team	Points
9	Spain	2
10	Chile	0
11	Germany	0
11	United States	0
13	Brazil	0
13	Paraguay	0
13	Peru	0
13	Uruguay	0

Source: Rugby7.com

IRB Sevens I
Preceded by 2000 Punta del Este Sevens	2000 Mar del Plata Sevens	Succeeded by 2000 Wellington Sevens
