= 2000 Wellington Sevens =

- IRB Sevens I
- Host nation: New Zealand
- Date: 4–5 February 2000

Cup
- Champion: Fiji
- Runner-up: New Zealand

Plate
- Winner: Canada
- Runner-up: South Africa

Bowl
- Winner: France
- Runner-up: Croatia

Tournament details
- Matches played: 41

The 2000 Wellington Sevens was a rugby sevens tournament that took place at the Westpac Stadium in Wellington between the 4–5 February 2000. It was the first edition of the Wellington Sevens and the fifth round of the 1999-2000 World Sevens Series.

After finishing on top of Pool B with three straight wins, Fiji took out their third sevens title of the season defeating hosts, New Zealand 24-14 in the cup final to regain the series lead. Canada took out the plate final while France won the bowl final over Croatia.

== Teams ==
Sixteen national teams played in the Wellington Sevens with the announcement of teams being revealed on the 21 January 2000.

- Argentina
- Australia
- Canada
- Cook Islands
- Croatia
- Fiji
- France
- Hong Kong
- Japan
- New Zealand
- Papua New Guinea
- Samoa
- South Africa
- Tonga
- United States
- Uruguay

== Pool stage ==
The pool stage was played on the first day of the tournament. The 16 teams were separated into four pools of four teams and teams in the same pool played each other once. The top two teams in each pool advanced to the Cup quarterfinals to compete for the 2000 Wellington Sevens title.

Key to colours in group tables
Teams that advanced to the Cup quarterfinals
Teams that advanced to the Bowl quarterfinals

=== Pool A ===
Pos	Team	Pld	W	D	L	PF	PA	PD	Pts
1	New Zealand	3	3	0	0	113	19	+94	9
2	Tonga	3	2	0	1	43	64	-21	7
3	France	3	1	0	2	45	56	−11	5
4	Cook Islands	3	0	0	3	26	88	−62	3

Source: World Rugby

4 February 2000

New Zealand	21–12	Cook Islands

Westpac Stadium, Wellington

4 February 2000

Tonga	14–0	France

Westpac Stadium, Wellington

4 February 2000

New Zealand	57–0	Tonga

Westpac Stadium, Wellington

4 February 2000

France	38–7	Cook Islands

Westpac Stadium, Wellington

4 February 2000

Tonga	29–7	Cook Islands

Westpac Stadium, Wellington

4 February 2000

New Zealand	35–7	France

Westpac Stadium, Wellington

Source: World Rugby

=== Pool B ===
Pos	Team	Pld	W	D	L	PF	PA	PD	Pts
1	Fiji	3	3	0	0	136	22	+114	9
2	Argentina	3	2	0	1	62	62	0	7
3	Papua New Guinea	3	1	0	2	44	87	−43	5
4	United States	3	0	0	3	27	98	−71	3

Source: World Rugby

4 February 2000

Fiji	54–0	Papua New Guinea

Westpac Stadium, Wellington

4 February 2000

Argentina	22–12	United States

Westpac Stadium, Wellington

4 February 2000

Fiji	47–10	United States

Westpac Stadium, Wellington

4 February 2000

Argentina	28–15	Papua New Guinea

Westpac Stadium, Wellington

4 February 2000

Papua New Guinea	29–5	United States

Westpac Stadium, Wellington

4 February 2000

Fiji	35–12	Argentina

Westpac Stadium, Wellington

Source: World Rugby

=== Pool C ===
Pos	Team	Pld	W	D	L	PF	PA	PD	Pts
1	Samoa	3	3	0	0	75	31	+44	9
2	Canada	3	2	0	1	71	33	+38	7
3	Croatia	3	1	0	2	27	71	-44	5
4	Uruguay	3	0	0	3	24	62	−38	3

Source: World Rugby

4 February 2000

Samoa	35–5	Croatia

Westpac Stadium, Wellington

4 February 2000

Canada	26–7	Uruguay

Westpac Stadium, Wellington

4 February 2000

Samoa	19–12	Uruguay

Westpac Stadium, Wellington

4 February 2000

Canada	31–5	Croatia

Westpac Stadium, Wellington

4 February 2000

Croatia	17–5	Uruguay

Westpac Stadium, Wellington

4 February 2000

Samoa	21–14	Canada

Westpac Stadium, Wellington

Source: World Rugby

=== Pool D ===
Pos	Team	Pld	W	D	L	PF	PA	PD	Pts
1	Australia	3	3	0	0	110	19	+91	9
2	South Africa	3	2	0	1	103	34	+69	7
3	Japan	3	1	0	2	42	88	−46	5
4	Hong Kong	3	0	0	3	15	129	−114	3

Source: World Rugby

4 February 2000

South Africa	49–5	Hong Kong

Westpac Stadium, Wellington

4 February 2000

Australia	36–7	Japan

Westpac Stadium, Wellington

4 February 2000

South Africa	42–7	Japan

Westpac Stadium, Wellington

4 February 2000

Australia	52–0	Hong Kong

Westpac Stadium, Wellington

4 February 2000

Japan	28–10	Hong Kong

Westpac Stadium, Wellington

4 February 2000

Australia	22–12	South Africa

Westpac Stadium, Wellington

Source: World Rugby

== Finals ==
=== Bowl ===
Quarter-finals
5 February – Westpac Stadium
France	24
United States	0
5 February – Westpac Stadium
Japan	17
Uruguay	7
5 February – Westpac Stadium
Croatia	33
Hong Kong	7
5 February – Westpac Stadium
Papua New Guinea	26
Cook Islands	14

Semi-finals
5 February – Westpac Stadium
France	40
Japan	12
5 February – Westpac Stadium
Croatia	31
Papua New Guinea	5

Final
5 February – Westpac Stadium
France	47
Croatia	12

Source: World Rugby

=== Plate ===
Semi-finals
5 February – Westpac Stadium
Argentina	19
Canada	22
5 February – Westpac Stadium
South Africa	21
Tonga	12

Final
5 February – Westpac Stadium
Canada	24
South Africa	21

Source: World Rugby

=== Cup ===
Quarter-finals
5 February – Westpac Stadium
New Zealand	42
Argentina	12
5 February – Westpac Stadium
Australia	21
Canada	10
5 February – Westpac Stadium
Samoa	29
South Africa	21
5 February – Westpac Stadium
Fiji	47
Tonga	7

Semi-finals
5 February – Westpac Stadium
New Zealand	19
Australia	0
5 February – Westpac Stadium
Samoa	12
Fiji	47

Final
5 February – Westpac Stadium
New Zealand	14
Fiji	24

Source: World Rugby

== Tournament placings ==
Place	Team	Points
1st place, gold medalist(s)	Fiji	20
2nd place, silver medalist(s)	New Zealand	16
3rd place, bronze medalist(s)	Australia	12
3rd place, bronze medalist(s)	Samoa	12
5	Canada	8
6	South Africa	6
7	Argentina	4
7	Tonga	4

Place	Team	Points
9	France	2
10	Croatia	0
11	Japan	0
11	Papua New Guinea	0
13	Cook Islands	0
13	Hong Kong	0
13	United States	0
13	Uruguay	0

Source: Rugby7.com

IRB Sevens I
Preceded by 2000 Mar del Plata Sevens	2000 Wellington Sevens	Succeeded by 2000 Fiji Sevens
Wellington Sevens
Preceded by None	2000 Wellington Sevens	Succeeded by 2001 Wellington Sevens
