= 1999 South Africa Sevens =

- IRB Sevens I
- Host nation: South Africa
- Date: 10–11 December 1999

Cup
- Champion: Fiji
- Runner-up: New Zealand

Plate
- Winner: Australia
- Runner-up: Samoa

Bowl
- Winner: Tonga
- Runner-up: Argentina

Tournament details
- Matches played: 41

The 1999 South Africa Sevens was an annual rugby sevens tournament that took place at the Danie Craven Stadium in Stellenbosch between 10 and 11 December 1999. It was the first edition of the South Africa Sevens with it being the second leg of the 1999–2000 World Sevens Series. Sixteen teams competed in the tournament and were divided into four groups of four with the top two teams qualifying for the quarter-finals.

The hosts, South Africa were eliminated in the semi-finals before Fiji defeated New Zealand 12–10 in the final to win their first sevens title for the series. Australia took home the plate while Tonga won the bowl.

Stellenbosch only hosted the South Africa Sevens tournament for one season and the event moved to Durban for the 2000–01 series.

== Teams ==
Sixteen teams competed in the South Africa Sevens with the South African Rugby Union inviting eight teams to fill in the draw. These teams were Georgia, Japan, Kenya, Morocco, Namibia, Tonga, Uruguay and Zimbabwe.

- Argentina
- Australia
- Canada
- Fiji
- France
- Georgia
- Japan
- Kenya
- Morocco
- Namibia
- New Zealand
- Samoa
- South Africa
- Tonga
- Uruguay
- Zimbabwe

== Format ==
The pool stage was played on the first day of the tournament. The 16 teams were separated into four groups of four teams and teams in the same pool played each other once. The top two teams in each pool advanced to the Cup quarterfinals to compete for the 1999 South Africa Sevens title.

== Summary ==
The opening day of the tournament saw Fiji setting the pace with the team only conceding ten points (against Canada throughout the group stage after comfortably defeating Japan (52–0) and Namibia (56–0) earlier in the day. Dubai champions, New Zealand also won their group despite the slow start over Zimbabwe as they finished ahead over Georgia who had shocked Argentina in the opening match of Pool B. Morocco who was an unknown in the rugby sevens shocked everyone by topping Pool C defeating Australia in the opening game by sevens points before topping the group with wins over France and Tonga. South Africa finished ahead of Samoa in Pool D with the Boks defeating them 12–7 after earlier recordings wins against Kenya and Uruguay.

The second day saw Fiji began with a physically demanding victory over Samoa as they would go on to advance to the cup final defeating Georgia in the semi-finals who had earlier defeated Morocco in the quarter-finals 17–0. They went on to meet New Zealand in the final after they defeated Australia in the quarter-finals and the hosts in the semis. After losing Waisale Serevi through a hand injury, Fiji trailed New Zealand by three points heading into the change over. Filimoni Delasau though would score the match winner as he recorded his 13th try of the tournament and give Fiji the victory 12–10. In the minor placings, Australia defeated Samoa by three points in the plate final with the bowl final being won by Tonga who defeated a fast finishing Argentina squad 31–24.

== Pool stage ==
Key to colours in group tables
Teams that advanced to the Cup quarterfinals
Teams that advanced to the Bowl quarterfinals

=== Pool A ===
Pos	Team	Pld	W	D	L	PF	PA	PD	Pts
1	Fiji	3	3	0	0	136	10	+126	9
2	Canada	3	2	0	1	81	54	+27	7
3	Namibia	3	1	0	2	41	99	−58	5
4	Japan	3	0	0	3	19	114	−95	3

Source: World Rugby

10 December 1999

Fiji	52–0	Japan

Danie Craven Stadium, Stellenbosch

10 December 1999

Canada	31–19	Namibia

Danie Craven Stadium, Stellenbosch

10 December 1999

Canada	40–7	Japan

Danie Craven Stadium, Stellenbosch

10 December 1999

Fiji	56–0	Namibia

Danie Craven Stadium, Stellenbosch

10 December 1999

Namibia	22–12	Japan

Danie Craven Stadium, Stellenbosch

10 December 1999

Fiji	28–10	Canada

Danie Craven Stadium, Stellenbosch

Source: World Rugby

=== Pool B ===
Pos	Team	Pld	W	D	L	PF	PA	PD	Pts
1	New Zealand	3	3	0	0	90	21	+69	9
2	Georgia	3	2	0	1	45	55	-10	7
3	Zimbabwe	3	1	0	2	43	71	−28	5
4	Argentina	3	0	0	3	35	66	−31	3

Source: World Rugby

10 December 1999

Georgia	21–14	Argentina

Danie Craven Stadium, Stellenbosch

10 December 1999

New Zealand	33–14	Zimbabwe

Danie Craven Stadium, Stellenbosch

10 December 1999

Zimbabwe	19–14	Argentina

Danie Craven Stadium, Stellenbosch

10 December 1999

New Zealand	31–0	Georgia

Danie Craven Stadium, Stellenbosch

10 December 1999

New Zealand	26–7	Argentina

Danie Craven Stadium, Stellenbosch

10 December 1999

Georgia	24–10	Zimbabwe

Danie Craven Stadium, Stellenbosch

Source: World Rugby

=== Pool C ===
Pos	Team	Pld	W	D	L	PF	PA	PD	Pts
1	Morocco	3	3	0	0	45	19	+26	9
2	Australia	3	2	0	1	64	55	+9	7
3	France	3	1	0	2	46	52	−6	5
4	Tonga	3	0	0	3	31	60	−29	3

Source: World Rugby

10 December 1999

France	22–12	Tonga

Danie Craven Stadium, Stellenbosch

10 December 1999

Morocco	19–12	Australia

Danie Craven Stadium, Stellenbosch

10 December 1999

Morocco	14–7	France

Danie Craven Stadium, Stellenbosch

10 December 1999

Australia	26–19	Tonga

Danie Craven Stadium, Stellenbosch

10 December 1999

Morocco	12–0	Tonga

Danie Craven Stadium, Stellenbosch

10 December 1999

Australia	26–17	France

Danie Craven Stadium, Stellenbosch

Source: World Rugby

=== Pool D ===
Pos	Team	Pld	W	D	L	PF	PA	PD	Pts
1	South Africa	3	3	0	0	80	7	+73	9
2	Samoa	3	2	0	1	80	17	+63	7
3	Uruguay	3	1	0	2	22	74	−52	5
4	Kenya	3	0	0	3	10	94	−84	3

Source: World Rugby

10 December 1999

Samoa	33–5	Uruguay

Danie Craven Stadium, Stellenbosch

10 December 1999

South Africa	37–0	Kenya

Danie Craven Stadium, Stellenbosch

10 December 1999

Samoa	40–0	Kenya

Danie Craven Stadium, Stellenbosch

10 December 1999

South Africa	31–0	Uruguay

Danie Craven Stadium, Stellenbosch

10 December 1999

Uruguay	17–10	Kenya

Danie Craven Stadium, Stellenbosch

10 December 1999

South Africa	12–7	Samoa

Danie Craven Stadium, Stellenbosch

Source: World Rugby

== Finals ==
=== Bowl ===
Quarter-finals
11 December – Danie Craven Stadium
Namibia	21
Kenya	20
11 December – Danie Craven Stadium
Argentina	19
France	10
11 December – Danie Craven Stadium
Uruguay	20
Japan	12
11 December – Danie Craven Stadium
Tonga	28
Zimbabwe	10

Semi-finals
11 December – Danie Craven Stadium
Namibia	12
Argentina	24
11 December – Danie Craven Stadium
Uruguay	5
Tonga	33

Final
11 December – Danie Craven Stadium
Argentina	26
Tonga	31

Source: World Rugby

=== Plate ===
Semi-finals
11 December – Danie Craven Stadium
Samoa	26
Morocco	7
11 December – Danie Craven Stadium
Canada	12
Australia	36

Final
11 December – Danie Craven Stadium
Samoa	19
Australia	22

Source: World Rugby

=== Cup ===
Quarter-finals
11 December – Danie Craven Stadium
Fiji	17
Samoa	14
11 December – Danie Craven Stadium
Georgia	17
Morocco	0
11 December – Danie Craven Stadium
South Africa	17
Canada	7
11 December – Danie Craven Stadium
New Zealand	22
Australia	14

Semi-finals
11 December – Danie Craven Stadium
Fiji	33
Georgia	5
11 December – Danie Craven Stadium
South Africa	0
New Zealand	26

Final
11 December – Danie Craven Stadium
Fiji	12
New Zealand	10

Source: World Rugby

== Tournament placings ==
Place	Team	Points
1st place, gold medalist(s)	Fiji	20
2nd place, silver medalist(s)	New Zealand	16
3rd place, bronze medalist(s)	Georgia	12
3rd place, bronze medalist(s)	South Africa	12
5	Australia	8
6	Samoa	6
7	Canada	4
7	Morocco	4

Place	Team	Points
9	Tonga	2
10	Argentina	0
11	Namibia	0
11	Uruguay	0
13	France	0
13	Japan	0
13	Kenya	0
13	Zimbabwe	0

Source: Rugby7.com

IRB Sevens I
Preceded by 1999 Dubai Sevens	1999 South Africa Sevens	Succeeded by 2000 Punta del Este Sevens
South Africa Sevens
Preceded by First	1999 South Africa Sevens	Succeeded by 2000 South Africa Sevens
