= 1999 Dubai Sevens =

- IRB Sevens I
- Host nation: UAE
- Date: 2–3 December 1999

Cup
- Champion: New Zealand
- Runner-up: Fiji

Plate
- Winner: Australia
- Runner-up: France

Bowl
- Winner: Scotland
- Runner-up: Zimbabwe

Tournament details
- Matches played: 41

The 1999 Dubai Sevens was an international rugby sevens tournament that took place at the Dubai Exiles Rugby Ground on 2 and 3 December 1999. It was the 12th edition of the Dubai Sevens and the inaugural event for the IRB Sevens World Series. Sixteen teams competed in the tournament and were divided into four groups of four teams with the top two qualifying through to the cup quarterfinals.

After winning their group, New Zealand defeated Fiji in the cup final by a score of 38–14. In the minor placings, Australia won the plate final over France while Scotland won the bowl final over Zimbabwe.

== Teams ==
Sixteen national teams played in the tournament:

- Australia
- Canada
- Fiji
- France
- Georgia
- Hong Kong
- Japan
- Kenya
- Morocco
- New Zealand
- Samoa
- Scotland
- South Africa
- Tonga
- United States
- Zimbabwe

== Pool stage ==
The pool stage was played on the first day of the tournament. The 16 teams were separated into four groups of four teams and teams in the same pool played each other once. The top two teams in each pool advanced to the Cup quarterfinals to compete for the 1999 Dubai Sevens title.

Key to colours in group tables
Teams that advanced to the Cup quarterfinals
Teams that advanced to the Bowl quarterfinals

=== Pool A ===
Pos	Team	Pld	W	D	L	PF	PA	PD	Pts
1	New Zealand	3	3	0	0	106	0	+106	9
2	Tonga	3	2	0	1	59	35	+24	7
3	Scotland	3	1	0	2	47	94	−47	5
4	Morocco	3	0	0	3	19	102	−83	3

Source: World Rugby

2 December 1999

New Zealand	14–0	Tonga

Dubai Exiles Rugby Ground, Dubai

2 December 1999

Scotland	33–12	Morocco

Dubai Exiles Rugby Ground, Dubai

2 December 1999

New Zealand	38–0	Morocco

Dubai Exiles Rugby Ground, Dubai

2 December 1999

Tonga	28–14	Scotland

Dubai Exiles Rugby Ground, Dubai

2 December 1999

New Zealand	54–0	Scotland

Dubai Exiles Rugby Ground, Dubai

2 December 1999

Tonga	31–7	Morocco

Dubai Exiles Rugby Ground, Dubai

Source: World Rugby

=== Pool B ===
Pos	Team	Pld	W	D	L	PF	PA	PD	Pts
1	Fiji	3	3	0	0	114	22	+92	9
2	Canada	3	2	0	1	65	52	+10	7
3	Zimbabwe	3	1	0	2	52	86	−34	5
4	Georgia	3	0	0	3	20	88	−68	3

Source: World Rugby

2 December 1999

Fiji	38–17	Zimbabwe

Dubai Exiles Rugby Ground, Dubai

2 December 1999

Canada	29–0	Georgia

Dubai Exiles Rugby Ground, Dubai

2 December 1999

Fiji	38–5	Georgia

Dubai Exiles Rugby Ground, Dubai

2 December 1999

Canada	33–14	Zimbabwe

Dubai Exiles Rugby Ground, Dubai

2 December 1999

Fiji	38–0	Canada

Dubai Exiles Rugby Ground, Dubai

2 December 1999

Zimbabwe	21–15	Georgia

Dubai Exiles Rugby Ground, Dubai

Source: World Rugby

=== Pool C ===
Pos	Team	Pld	W	D	L	PF	PA	PD	Pts
1	Australia	3	3	0	0	92	20	+72	9
2	France	3	2	0	1	78	32	+46	7
3	United States	3	1	0	2	37	67	−30	5
4	Kenya	3	0	0	3	12	100	−88	3

Source: World Rugby

2 December 1999

Australia	36–15	United States

Dubai Exiles Rugby Ground, Dubai

2 December 1999

France	49–5	Kenya

Dubai Exiles Rugby Ground, Dubai

2 December 1999

Australia	39–0	Kenya

Dubai Exiles Rugby Ground, Dubai

2 December 1999

France	24–10	United States

Dubai Exiles Rugby Ground, Dubai

2 December 1999

Australia	17–5	France

Dubai Exiles Rugby Ground, Dubai

2 December 1999

United States	12–7	Kenya

Dubai Exiles Rugby Ground, Dubai

Source: World Rugby

=== Pool D ===
Pos	Team	Pld	W	D	L	PF	PA	PD	Pts
1	South Africa	3	3	0	0	72	28	+44	9
2	Samoa	3	2	0	1	66	25	+41	7
3	Japan	3	1	0	2	50	85	−35	5
4	Hong Kong	3	0	0	3	26	76	−50	3

Source: World Rugby

2 December 1999

Samoa	38–7	Japan

Dubai Exiles Rugby Ground, Dubai

2 December 1999

South Africa	26–7	Hong Kong

Dubai Exiles Rugby Ground, Dubai

2 December 1999

Samoa	21–7	Hong Kong

Dubai Exiles Rugby Ground, Dubai

2 December 1999

South Africa	35–14	Japan

Dubai Exiles Rugby Ground, Dubai

2 December 1999

South Africa	11–7	Samoa

Dubai Exiles Rugby Ground, Dubai

2 December 1999

Japan	29–12	Hong Kong

Dubai Exiles Rugby Ground, Dubai

Source: World Rugby

== Finals ==
=== Bowl ===
Quarter-finals
3 December – Dubai Exiles Rugby Ground
Scotland	19
Georgia	12
3 December – Dubai Exiles Rugby Ground
Kenya	19
Japan	17
3 December – Dubai Exiles Rugby Ground
United States	29
Hong Kong	0
3 December – Dubai Exiles Rugby Ground
Zimbabwe	24
Morocco	7

Semi-finals
3 December – Dubai Exiles Rugby Ground
Scotland	41
Kenya	0
3 December – Dubai Exiles Rugby Ground
United States	7
Zimbabwe	31

Final
3 December – Dubai Exiles Rugby Ground
Scotland	31
Zimbabwe	24

Source: World Rugby

=== Plate ===
Semi-finals
3 December – Dubai Exiles Rugby Ground
Canada	12
France	17
3 December – Dubai Exiles Rugby Ground
Australia	17
Tonga	10

Final
3 December – Dubai Exiles Rugby Ground
France	20
Australia	33

Source: World Rugby

=== Cup ===
Quarter-finals
3 December – Dubai Exiles Rugby Ground
New Zealand	21
Canada	19
3 December – Dubai Exiles Rugby Ground
South Africa	24
France	0
3 December – Dubai Exiles Rugby Ground
Samoa	21
Australia	12
3 December – Dubai Exiles Rugby Ground
Fiji	50
Tonga	5

Semi-finals
3 December – Dubai Exiles Rugby Ground
New Zealand	31
South Africa	0
3 December – Dubai Exiles Rugby Ground
Samoa	14
Fiji	21

Final
3 December – Dubai Exiles Rugby Ground
New Zealand	38
Fiji	14

Source: World Rugby

== Tournament placings ==
Place	Team	Points
1st place, gold medalist(s)	New Zealand	20
2nd place, silver medalist(s)	Fiji	16
3rd place, bronze medalist(s)	Samoa	12
3rd place, bronze medalist(s)	South Africa	12
5	Australia	8
6	France	6
7	Canada	4
7	Tonga	4

Place	Team	Points
9	Scotland	2
10	Zimbabwe	0
11	United States	0
11	Kenya	0
13	Japan	0
13	Georgia	0
13	Hong Kong	0
13	Morocco	0

Source: Rugby7.com

IRB Sevens I
Preceded by First	1999 Dubai Sevens	Succeeded by 1999 South Africa Sevens
Dubai Sevens
Preceded by First	1999 Dubai Sevens	Succeeded by 2000 Dubai Sevens
