= Peru national rugby sevens team =

Peru
- Union: Peruvian Rugby Federation
- Nickname: Los Tumis
- Coach: Ramiro Chavez
Team kit	Change kit

First international
- Uruguay 36–0 Peru (Punta del Este, Uruguay; 7 January 2000)

Largest win
- Peru 46–0 Panama (Guarne, Colombia; 8 July 2016)

Largest defeat
- Argentina 64–0 Peru (Santa Fe, Argentina; 6 June 2015)

World Cup
- Appearances: 0

The Peru national rugby sevens team, is the representative national team in the sport of rugby sevens for the nation of Peru. The national team usually competes in the CONSUR Sevens (the regional tournament of South America).

The team is nicknamed Los Tumis.

== Tournament history ==
Pan American Games
Pan American Games record
Year	Round	Position	Pld	W	L	D
2011	Did not qualify					
2015	Did not qualify					
2019	Did not qualify					
2023	To be determined					
2027	To be determined					
Total	N/A	0/3	0	0	0	0

Rugby World Cup Sevens
World Cup record
Year	Round	Position	Pld	W	L	D
(Scotland) 1993	Did not qualify					
1997	Did not qualify					
2001	Did not qualify					
2005	Did not qualify					
2009	Did not qualify					
2013	Did not qualify					
2018	Did not qualify					
2022	Did not qualify					
Total	N/A	0/8	0	0	0	0
