= Joeli Lutumailagi =

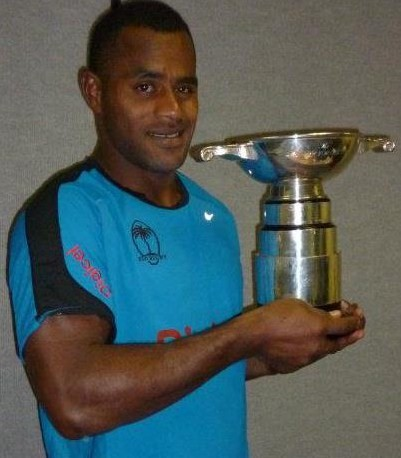
- Born: Joeli Lutumailagi Kata; 31 October 1985 (age 41) Sigatoka
- Height: 1.80 m (5 ft 11 in)
- Weight: 96 kg (15 st 2 lb; 212 lb)

Rugby union career
- Position(s): Wing, Centre, Fullback
Senior career
Years	Team	Apps	(Points)
2007-12	Nadroga		
2012-13	Narbonne	0	(0)
2017-18	Vannes	17	(45)
National sevens team
Years	Team		Comps
2008–	Fiji 7s		98

Joeli Lutumailagi Kata (born 31 October 1985) is a Fiji rugby union player. He plays for the Fiji sevens team. He currently plays for French club Vannes.

== Early life and career ==
Lutumailagi is from the village of Narata in the Nadroga. He is from a family of four where he is the only boy. He started his career playing in the local 7's competition. His impressive performance saw him getting drafted into the Nadroga 15's team for the Digicel Cup playing wing and then into

== National team ==
He played for the Fiji Barbarians team for the 2008 Pacific Rugby Cup.

In February 2010, he was called up to the Fiji 7's team for the 2011 USA Sevens replacing winger, Waisale Beci. The team lost in the final to South Africa. He played in the remaining tournaments that season as well. He was called back for the 2011–12 IRB Sevens World Series in which he helped Fiji win the Gold Coast Hong Kong and the London sevens. Fiji finished second in the series but Lutumailagi scored 28 tries in that season.

He played in the first few tournaments of the 2012–13 IRB Sevens World Series before Pro D2 side, Narbonne signed him up for the 2012–13 Rugby Pro D2 season, but he suffered a horrific neck injury which took nine months to heal. After recovering he played a few games for Narbonne as well as trained for the IRB 7s World Cup. He went on to play rugby in Sri Lanka then returned home for the Marist 7s tournament and played for Tabadamu.

In March 2014, he got a new lease of life when the then coach Ben Ryan called him up to replace the injured Leo Naikasau. But after some disciplinary issues, Ryan dropped Lutumailagi and Naikasau from the team for not making their way to fitness training.

== Return ==
He did not feature again for the Fiji 7's team until December 2016, when the new interim coach, Nacanieli Cawanibuka brought him back for the 2016 Dubai Sevens. He was then also selected by the new Fiji 7's coach, Gareth Baber for the 2017 Wellington Sevens as well as the 2017 Sydney Sevens as well. He scored the try of the 2017 Wellington Sevens after he outpaced South African winger, Seabelo Senatla to score Fiji's only try in the final.
