= Justin Geduld =

South African rugby union player

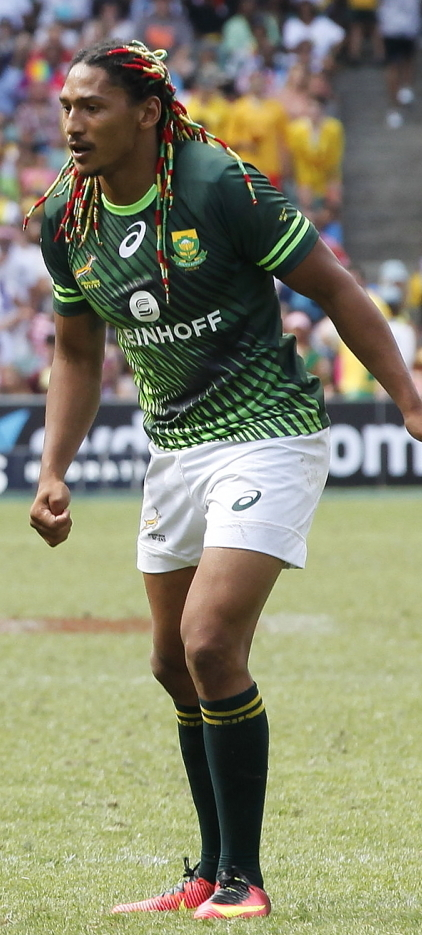
- Full name: Justin Gilberto Geduld
- Born: 1 October 1993 (age 33) Cape Town, South Africa
- Height: 1.75 m (5 ft 9 in)
- Weight: 70 kg (150 lb; 11 st 0 lb)
- School: Hoërskool Tygerberg

Rugby union career
- Position: Centre
- Current team: Western Province
Youth career
- 2011–2012: Western Province
Senior career
Years	Team	Apps	(Points)
2013–2014	Western Province	4	(10)
2025–	Western Province	0	(0)
2025–	Stormers	0	(0)
- Correct as of 5 September 2025
International career
Years	Team	Apps	(Points)
2014–2025	South Africa Sevens	186	(833)
2013	South Africa Under-20	3	(10)
- Correct as of 5 September 2025
Medal record
Men's rugby sevens
Representing South Africa
Rugby World Cup Sevens
Bronze medal – third place	2018 San Francisco	Team competition
Olympic Games
Bronze medal – third place	2016 Rio de Janeiro	Team competition
Commonwealth Games
Gold medal – first place	2014 Glasgow	Team competition
Africa Men's Sevens
Silver medal – second place	2024 Mauritius	Team competition

Justin Gilberto Geduld (born 1 October 1993) is a South African rugby union player, currently contracted to SARU as a sevens rugby player, as well as playing domestic rugby union for Western Province. His regular position is centre.

He was a member of the South Africa Sevens team that won a bronze medal at the 2016 Summer Olympics.

== Youth rugby ==
Geduld represented Western Province at the 2011 Craven Week competition and also played for their Under-19 team in the 2012 Under-19 Provincial Championship competition. Geduld was included in the S.A. Under-20 squad for the 2013 IRB Junior World Championship.

== National sevens team ==
In 2013, Geduld was contracted to play rugby sevens for the South Africa Sevens team. He represented the team in the 2012–13 IRB Sevens World Series and played in tournaments in New Zealand, Hong Kong, Japan and Scotland.

Geduld was included in a 12-man squad for the 2016 Summer Olympics in Rio de Janeiro. He was named in the starting lineup for their first match in Group B of the competition against Spain, with South Africa winning the match 24–0.
