= Neria Fomai =

Samoan rugby union player (born 1992)

- Born: 3 February 1992 (age 34) Auckland, New Zealand
- Height: 1.78 m (5 ft 10 in)
- Weight: 98 kg (216 lb; 15 st 6 lb)
- School: Hastings Boys' High School

Rugby union career
- Position(s): Centre, Wing
- Current team: Hawke's Bay
Senior career
Years	Team	Apps	(Points)
2017	Southland	8	(5)
2019–	Hawke's Bay	53	(115)
2022–2025	Moana Pasifika	17	(10)
- Correct as of 27 December 2025
International career
Years	Team	Apps	(Points)
2021–	Samoa	10	(0)
- Correct as of 8 October 2023
National sevens team
Years	Team		Comps
2013–2018	Samoa		15
- Correct as of 28 August 2023

Neria Fomai (born 3 February 1992) is a rugby union player, who currently plays as a centre or wing for Hawke's Bay in New Zealand's domestic National Provincial Championship competition. He previously played for Moana Pasifika in Super Rugby. He was born and raised in New Zealand, but has represented Manu Samoa – for which he is eligible due to his Samoan heritage – both in the fifteen-a-side form of the game and rugby sevens.

== Early career ==
Fomai, who is a younger brother of former Manu Samoa and Hawke's Bay loose forward Tivaini Fomai, was born in Auckland. With his family, he later moved to Hastings in Hawke's Bay, where he attended Hastings Boys' High School.

Since leaving high school, Fomai played club rugby for Hastings Rugby & Sports Club in the Hawke's Bay club rugby competition. He was named the Club Rugby Player of the Year in 2016, ten years after his brother Tivaini became the inaugural winner of that award.

In 2016, he played representative rugby for the Hawke's Bay Saracens – the development team of the Hawke's Bay (National Provincial Championship) (NPC) team – and the Hawke's Bay Samoans team. Fomai also played several seasons for the Hawke's Bay Sevens team, which he captained during the 2016–2017 season.

== Senior career ==
In July 2017, Fomai joined Southland for the 2017 Mitre 10 Cup season. He made his debut for the Stags on 19 August 2017 against his home province Hawke's Bay. His debut was short-lived as he had to leave the field within 5 minutes from kick-off, after suffering a head-knock. He returned from injury three weeks later and earned his first start for Southland in a Ranfurly Shield game against Canterbury on 8 September 2017. He scored his first NPC try in that game. He played a total of 8 games for Southland that season.

After being spotted while playing at the National Maori Rugby League tournament in Rotorua in 2018, Fomai was called into the New Zealand Warriors preseason training squad ahead of the 2019 NRL season. He played in the Warriors' preseason game against Melbourne Storm and scored the side's first try, but wasn't offered a contract.

Later that year, Fomai was named in the Hawke's Bay squad for the 2019 Mitre 10 Cup season. He made his Magpies debut – off the bench – against Manawatu on 11 August 2019. His starting debut for Hawke's Bay followed on 31 August 2019 against Northland, a game in which he scored a hat-trick. Since then, he's been a regular starter for the province.

While not named in any Super Rugby squad, Fomai did get some recognition for a good 2020 Mitre 10 Cup season with Hawke's Bay. Ahead of the 2021 Super Rugby Aotearoa season, he signed a short-term contract with the Blues as injury cover, and played in one of the franchise's preseason games. Later in the season, he joined the Highlanders as injury cover for the 2021 Super Rugby Trans-Tasman competition, but didn't get game time.

On 18 October 2021, new Super Rugby franchise Moana Pasifika announced the signing of Fomai for its first ever Super Rugby squad. He made his Super Rugby debut for the franchise in their inaugural game on 4 March 2022 against the Crusaders. He scored his first Super Rugby try in Moana Pasifika's second game of the season, against the Chiefs, on 19 March 2022.

Fomai played 17 games and scored two tries during Moana Pasifika's first three seasons of Super Rugby. He missed the entire 2025 Super Rugby Pacific season while recovering from ACL reconstruction surgery. That season turned out to be his last with the franchise. On 6 June 2025, Moana Pasifika announced the departure of 15 players from its squad; Fomai was listed as one of those players.

== International career ==
Fomai first made the Samoa Sevens team for the 2013 Scotland and London Sevens tournaments, which were part of 2012–13 IRB Sevens World Series. After several years of absence from the squad, Fomai was again named in the Samoan Sevens team in January 2017. Later that year, he was one of 22 Samoan sevens players to earn a contract for the 2017/2018 season.

Between 2013 and 2018, Fomai played in 15 international sevens tournaments, including the 2018 Rugby World Cup Sevens and 2018 Commonwealth Games. He scored 65 points in 60 matches for Samoa.

On 28 May 2021, Fomai was named in the Manu Samoa (fifteen-a-side) squad for the first time. He made his debut for Samoa on 26 June 2021 against the Māori All Blacks and scored a try on debut.
