= Ruwellyn Isbell =

South African rugby union player

- Full name: Ruwellyn Miguel Isbell
- Born: 17 February 1993 (age 33) Somerset East, South Africa
- Height: 1.78 m (5 ft 10 in)
- Weight: 88 kg (194 lb; 13 st 12 lb)
- School: Grey College, Bloemfontein

Rugby union career
- Position: Winger
Youth career
- 2006: Eastern Province Kings
- 2009–2011: Free State Cheetahs
- 2012: Blue Bulls
Senior career
Years	Team	Apps	(Points)
2014–2021	Pumas	66	(150)
- Correct as of 12 January 2022
International career
Years	Team	Apps	(Points)
2010	S.A. Under-18 High Performance		
2011	S.A. Schools	0	(0)
2012	South Africa Sevens		
- Correct as of 12 March 2014
Medal record
Men's rugby sevens
Representing South Africa
World Games
Gold medal – first place	2013 Cali	Team competition

Ruwellyn Miguel Isbell (born 17 February 1993) is a South African professional rugby union player for the Pumas in the Currie Cup and in the Rugby Challenge. His regular position is winger.

== Career ==
=== Youth ===
In 2006, he appeared for Eastern Province at the Under-13 Craven Week competition. He then joined Grey College in Bloemfontein and played for the Free State Under-16 side at the 2009 Grant Khomo Week and their Under-18 side at the 2011 Craven Week, alongside future Springbok Jan Serfontein.

In 2010, he was included in an Under-18 High Performance squad that played in international friendlies against youth sides from France, Namibia and England. The following year, he was included in the S.A. Schools side that faced a France Invitational side, but missed the game through injury.

He moved to Pretoria in 2012 to join the Blue Bulls academy. He made ten appearances and scored three tries during the 2012 Under-19 Provincial Championship competition as the Blue Bulls U19 side reached the final of the competition.

=== Sevens ===
At the end of 2012, Isbell received a call-up to the South Africa Sevens side for the 2012–13 IRB Sevens World Series and he made his debut at the 2012 Gold Coast Sevens. He also played in the Dubai and South African legs of the competition and won a gold medal at the 2013 World Games.

=== Pumas ===
He moved to Nelspruit-based side Pumas in 2014. He was included in their squad for the 2014 Vodacom Cup competition and made his debut for them in the opening match of the season against the Falcons.

He was a member of the Pumas side that won the Vodacom Cup for the first time in 2015, beating Western Province 24–7 in the final. Isbell made three appearances during the season, scoring three tries.
