= 2013 Hong Kong Sevens =

Rugby union sevens tournament

- Host nation: Hong Kong
- Date: 22–24 March 2013

Cup
- Champion: Fiji
- Runner-up: Wales
- Third: New Zealand

Plate
- Winner: Samoa
- Runner-up: Canada

Bowl
- Winner: England
- Runner-up: Hong Kong

Shield
- Winner: France
- Runner-up: Argentina

Tournament details
- Matches played: 45
- Tries scored: 231 (average 5.13 per match)
- Most points: (France) Paul Albaladejo (42 points)
- Most tries: (Fiji) Samisoni Viriviri (8 tries)

The 2013 Hong Kong Sevens was the 38th edition of the Hong Kong Sevens and the sixth tournament of the 2012–13 IRB Sevens World Series. It was hosted by its long-time home, Hong Kong Stadium.

Fiji won the title by defeating Wales 26–19 in the final.

== Format ==
The teams were divided into pools of four teams, who played a round-robin within the pool. Points were awarded in each pool on the standard schedule for rugby sevens tournaments (though different from the standard in the 15-man game)—3 for a win, 2 for a draw, 1 for a loss.

Building on the changes made for the 2012 Hong Kong Sevens, in which two separate 12-team competitions were contested, the International Rugby Board (IRB) expanded the event to a total of 28 teams, again divided into two competitions.

The main draw consisted of 16 teams—the same number that were involved in all regular series events. The contestants were the 15 core teams guaranteed of places in each series event, plus Hong Kong, which qualified as winner of the 2012 HSBC Asian Sevens Series. These teams competed in Pools A, B, C, and D. The winners and runners-up from each pool in the main draw qualified for the Cup quarterfinals. The losers of these quarterfinals competed in the Plate semifinals. The remaining 8 teams competed in the Bowl quarterfinals, with the losers of these matches competing in the Shield semifinals.

The second competition was the newly instituted World Series Pre-Qualifier. It featured 12 teams, specifically two qualifiers from each of IRB's six regional sevens competitions. These teams played in Pools E, F, and G. The top two teams from each pool, plus the top two third-place teams, advanced to the knockout stage. The four quarterfinal winners advanced, along with Hong Kong, to the World Series Core Team Qualifier at the 2013 London Sevens.

== Teams ==
28 teams participated:

=== Main draw ===
- Argentina
- Australia
- Canada
- England
- Fiji
- France
- Hong Kong
- Kenya
- New Zealand
- Portugal
- Western Samoa
- Scotland
- South Africa
- Spain
- United States
- Wales

=== World Series pre-qualifier ===
- Chinese Taipei
- Japan
- Tonga
- Cook Islands
- Georgia
- Russia
- Zimbabwe
- Tunisia
- Mexico
- Jamaica
- Brazil
- Uruguay

== Main draw ==
The draw was made on February 21.

Key to colours in group tables
Teams that advanced to the Cup quarterfinal

=== Pool stage ===
==== Pool A ====
Pos	Team	Pld	W	D	L	PF	PA	PD	Pts
1	Wales	3	2	0	1	38	59	−21	7
2	Australia	3	2	0	1	47	36	+11	7
3	Argentina	3	1	0	2	40	31	+9	5
4	South Africa	3	1	0	2	43	42	+1	5

22 March 2013
18:12

Wales	19 − 14	Australia
	Report

Hong Kong Stadium

22 March 2013
21:16

South Africa	0 − 21	Argentina
	Report

Hong Kong Stadium

23 March 2013
11:12

Wales	19 − 14	Argentina
	Report

Hong Kong Stadium

23 March 2013
13:46

South Africa	12 − 21	Australia
	Report

Hong Kong Stadium

23 March 2013
17:26

Argentina	5 − 12	Australia
	Report

Hong Kong Stadium

23 March 2013
20:00

South Africa	31 − 0	Wales
	Report

Hong Kong Stadium

==== Pool B ====
Pos	Team	Pld	W	D	L	PF	PA	PD	Pts
1	New Zealand	3	3	0	0	88	31	+57	9
2	Kenya	3	2	0	1	43	62	−19	7
3	France	3	1	0	2	50	71	−21	5
4	United States	3	0	0	3	45	62	−17	3

22 March 2013
17:50

United States	14 − 17	Kenya
	Report

Hong Kong Stadium

22 March 2013
20:54

New Zealand	33 − 12	France
	Report

Hong Kong Stadium

23 March 2013
10:50

United States	19 − 21	France
	Report

Hong Kong Stadium

23 March 2013
13:24

New Zealand	31 − 7	Kenya
	Report

Hong Kong Stadium

23 March 2013
17:04

France	17 − 19	Kenya
	Report

Hong Kong Stadium

23 March 2013
19:38

New Zealand	24 − 12	United States
	Report

Hong Kong Stadium

==== Pool C ====
Pos	Team	Pld	W	D	L	PF	PA	PD	Pts
1	Portugal	3	2	0	1	48	53	−5	7
2	Samoa	3	1	1	1	50	33	+17	6
3	Scotland	3	1	1	1	47	44	+3	6
4	England	3	1	0	2	34	49	−15	5

22 March 2013
17:28

Scotland	21 − 27	Portugal
	Report

Hong Kong Stadium

22 March 2013
20:32

Samoa	28 − 7	England
	Report

Hong Kong Stadium

23 March 2013
10:28

Scotland	14 − 5	England
	Report

Hong Kong Stadium

23 March 2013
13:02

Samoa	10 − 14	Portugal
	Report

Hong Kong Stadium

23 March 2013
16:42

England	22 − 7	Portugal
	Report

Hong Kong Stadium

23 March 2013
19:16

Samoa	12 − 12	Scotland
	Report

Hong Kong Stadium

==== Pool D ====
Pos	Team	Pld	W	D	L	PF	PA	PD	Pts
1	Fiji	3	3	0	0	84	17	+67	9
2	Canada	3	2	0	1	50	45	+5	7
3	Spain	3	1	0	2	47	67	−20	5
4	Hong Kong	3	0	0	3	26	78	−52	3

22 March 2013
17:06

Fiji	36 − 0	Hong Kong
	Report

Hong Kong Stadium

22 March 2013
20:10

Canada	31 − 7	Spain
	Report

Hong Kong Stadium

23 March 2013
10:06

Fiji	22 − 12	Spain
	Report

Hong Kong Stadium

23 March 2013
12:40

Canada	14 − 12	Hong Kong
	Report

Hong Kong Stadium

23 March 2013
16:20

Spain	28 − 14	Hong Kong
	Report

Hong Kong Stadium

23 March 2013
18:54

Fiji	26 − 5	Canada
	Report

Hong Kong Stadium

=== Knockout stage ===
==== Shield ====
Quarter-finals
24 March – 10:24 – Hong Kong Stadium
Argentina	5
Hong Kong	7
24 March – 10:45 – Hong Kong Stadium
Scotland	12
United States	21
24 March – 11:06 – Hong Kong Stadium
Spain	14
South Africa	28
24 March – 11:27 – Hong Kong Stadium
France	7
England	42

Semi-finals
24 March – 13:54 – Hong Kong Stadium
Argentina	12
Scotland	7
24 March – 14:16 – Hong Kong Stadium
Spain	0
France	28

Final
24 March – 17:15 – Hong Kong Stadium
Argentina	14
France	19

==== Bowl ====
Quarter-finals
24 March – 10:24 – Hong Kong Stadium
Argentina	5
Hong Kong	7
24 March – 10:45 – Hong Kong Stadium
Scotland	12
United States	21
24 March – 11:06 – Hong Kong Stadium
Spain	14
South Africa	28
24 March – 11:27 – Hong Kong Stadium
France	7
England	42

Semi-finals
24 March – 14:38 – Hong Kong Stadium
Hong Kong	20
United States	12
24 March – 15:00 – Hong Kong Stadium
South Africa	14
England	26

Final
24 March – 17:40 – Hong Kong Stadium
Hong Kong	7
England	42

==== Plate ====
Quarter-finals
24 March – 11:48 – Hong Kong Stadium
Wales	28
Canada	14
24 March – 12:09 – Hong Kong Stadium
Portugal	12
Kenya	15
24 March – 12:30 – Hong Kong Stadium
Fiji	29
Australia	5
24 March – 12:51 – Hong Kong Stadium
New Zealand	21
Samoa	14

Semi-finals
24 March – 15:22 – Hong Kong Stadium
Canada	19
Portugal	14
24 March – 15:44 – Hong Kong Stadium
Australia	5
Samoa	12

Final
24 March – 18:05 – Hong Kong Stadium
Canada	7
Samoa	12

==== Cup ====
Quarter-finals
24 March – 11:48 – Hong Kong Stadium
Wales	28
Canada	14
24 March – 12:09 – Hong Kong Stadium
Portugal	12
Kenya	15
24 March – 12:30 – Hong Kong Stadium
Fiji	29
Australia	5
24 March – 12:51 – Hong Kong Stadium
New Zealand	21
Samoa	14

Semi-finals
24 March – 16:06 – Hong Kong Stadium
Wales	19
Kenya	0
24 March – 16:28 – Hong Kong Stadium
Fiji	33
New Zealand	14

Final
24 March – 19:00 – Hong Kong Stadium
Wales	19
Fiji	26
Third place
24 March – 18:30 – Hong Kong Stadium
Kenya	5
New Zealand	36

== World Series pre-qualifier ==
Key to colours in group tables
Teams that advanced to the Qualifier (Shield) quarterfinal

=== Pool E ===
Pos	Team	Pld	W	D	L	PF	PA	PD	Pts
1	Tonga	3	3	0	0	78	12	+66	9
2	Tunisia	3	1	0	2	48	45	+3	5
3	Uruguay	3	1	0	2	29	50	−21	5
4	Chinese Taipei	3	1	0	2	38	86	−48	5

22 March 2013
16:44

Uruguay	24 − 12	Chinese Taipei

Hong Kong Stadium

22 March 2013
19:18

Tonga	14 − 12	Tunisia

Hong Kong Stadium

23 March 2013
09:44

Uruguay	5 − 12	Tunisia
	Report

Hong Kong Stadium

23 March 2013
12:18

Tonga	38 − 0	Chinese Taipei
	Report

Hong Kong Stadium

23 March 2013
15:58

Tunisia	24 − 26	Chinese Taipei
	Report

Hong Kong Stadium

23 March 2013
18:32

Tonga	26 − 0	Uruguay
	Report

Hong Kong Stadium

=== Pool F ===
Pos	Team	Pld	W	D	L	PF	PA	PD	Pts
1	Japan	3	3	0	0	86	17	+69	9
2	Brazil	3	1	1	1	60	41	+19	6
3	Georgia	3	1	1	1	53	62	−9	6
4	Jamaica	3	0	0	3	22	101	−79	3

22 March 2013
16:22

Georgia	27 − 17	Jamaica

Hong Kong Stadium

22 March 2013
18:56

Japan	17 − 10	Brazil

Hong Kong Stadium

23 March 2013
09:22

Georgia	19 − 19	Brazil
	Report

Hong Kong Stadium

23 March 2013
11:56

Japan	43 − 0	Jamaica
	Report

Hong Kong Stadium

23 March 2013
15:36

Brazil	31 − 5	Jamaica
	Report

Hong Kong Stadium

23 March 2013
18:10

Japan	26 − 7	Georgia
	Report

Hong Kong Stadium

=== Pool G ===
Pos	Team	Pld	W	D	L	PF	PA	PD	Pts
1	Russia	3	3	0	0	95	22	+73	9
2	Zimbabwe	3	2	0	1	68	21	+47	7
3	Cook Islands	3	1	0	2	39	82	−43	5
4	Mexico	3	0	0	3	15	92	−77	3

22 March 2013
16:00

Zimbabwe	27 − 0	Mexico
	Report

Hong Kong Stadium

22 March 2013
18:34

Russia	43 − 5	Cook Islands
	Report

Hong Kong Stadium

23 March 2013
09:00

Zimbabwe	29 − 0	Cook Islands
	Report

Hong Kong Stadium

23 March 2013
11:34

Russia	31 − 5	Mexico
	Report

Hong Kong Stadium

23 March 2013
15:14

Cook Islands	34 − 10	Mexico
	Report

Hong Kong Stadium

23 March 2013
17:48

Russia	21 − 12	Zimbabwe
	Report

Hong Kong Stadium

=== Ranking matches ===
Quarter-finals
24 March – 09:00 – Hong Kong Stadium
Russia	26
Uruguay	12
24 March – 09:21 – Hong Kong Stadium
Zimbabwe	21
Brazil	7
24 March – 09:42 – Hong Kong Stadium
Tonga	12
Tunisia	5
24 March – 10:03 – Hong Kong Stadium
Japan	0
Georgia	17

Semi-finals
24 March – 13:12 – Hong Kong Stadium
Russia	5
Zimbabwe	19
24 March – 13:33 – Hong Kong Stadium
Tonga	19
Georgia	7

Final
24 March – 16:50 – Hong Kong Stadium
Zimbabwe	22
Tonga	19

By making it to the semifinals, Russia, Zimbabwe, Tonga, and Georgia have qualified for the Promotion tournament, along with Hong Kong and the bottom three core teams following the 2013 Scotland Sevens. The promotion tournament took place at the 2013 London Sevens.
