= Frank Horne =

Frank Horne could refer to:

- Frank Smith Horne (1899–1974), American poet and government official
- Frank Horne (footballer) (1905–1958), Australian rules footballer
- Frank Horne (Georgia politician), Democratic member of the 138th Georgia General Assembly from Macon

== See also ==
- Frankie Horne (born 1983), South African rugby union player
