= Metuisela Talebula =

Fiji international rugby union player

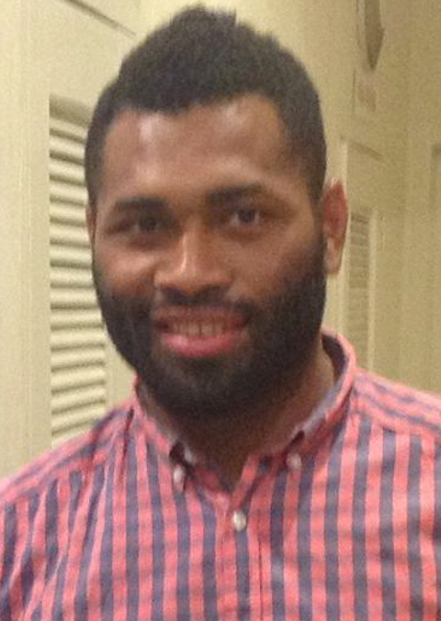
- Born: Metuisela Talebulamaijaina; 20 May 1991 (age 35) Lautoka, Fiji
- Height: 1.86 m (6 ft 1 in)
- Weight: 98 kg (15 st 6 lb; 216 lb)
- School: Lelean Memorial School

Rugby union career
- Position(s): Wing, fly-half, fullback, centre
- Current team: Bordeaux
Senior career
Years	Team	Apps	(Points)
2012–17	Bordeaux	118	(229)
2018-19	Bayonne	16	(10)
- Correct as of 3 December 2019
International career
Years	Team	Apps	(Points)
2012 –	Fiji	25	(60)
- Correct as of 30 June 2019
National sevens team
Years	Team		Comps
2011–12	Fiji		6

Metuisela Talebula (born 20 May 1991) is a Fijian rugby union footballer. He plays fullback, fly-half and wing for Bordeaux Bègles and Fiji.

== International ==
Talebula was selected to play for the Fiji Juniors to the 2011 IRB Junior World Championship in Italy. He scored three tries in the tournament and also helped Fiji finish in their best position at sixth.

He joined the Fiji Sevens team and helped the Fiji team lift the 2011 Gold Coast Sevens cup title. During the 2011–12 IRB Sevens World Series, he also helped Fiji lift two more titles by winning the 2012 Hong Kong Sevens where he was the top point scorer collecting 52 points and 2012 London Sevens. In the 2012 Scotland Sevens he was also awarded the top scorer scoring 88 points including joint top-try scorer with eight tries. Altogether, Talebula scored 271 points in that season which includes 25 tries. He joined the Fiji senior team right after the final leg of the Sevens series. He was included in the Fiji team for the 2012 IRB Pacific Nations Cup.

Talebula made his debut for Fiji against Scotland at Churchill Park in Lautoka on 16 June 2012. He came off the bench in the 60th minute as a full-back replacement for Waisea Nayacalevu and after a brilliant counter by winger, Isimeli Koniferedi, he scored an individual try. He played his next test on the same ground starting at fullback. He scored two tries and kicked a conversion in their win against Tonga. He was selected in the Fiji 15's team to the 2012 end-of-year rugby union tests with tests against Gloucester, Ireland, England and Georgia.

In summer 2013, Talebula led the Fiji Sevens team to a third place during the Sevens World Cup 2013 being the top try scorer of the tournament with 7 tries and finishing second on the point scorer list with 43 points.

At the end of 2013, Talebula was selected for the Autumn internationals including games against Portugal, Romania, Italy and the Barbarians. Unfortunately, he missed both the first game against Portugal (due to an injury) and the one against the Barbarians (game with Bordeaux). However, he scored a try in each of the other two games starting at fullback.

In 2014, Talebula has been included in the Fijian squad playing Italy (2014 mid-year rugby union tests), the Pacific Nations Cup and the World Cup Qualifier against the Cook Islands.

== Club ==
In June 2012 Talebula signed a contract with French Top 14 side Bordeaux Bègles. In his first season, he has played 22 games for them scoring 43 points including eight tries.

During the Top 14 season (2013–14) Talebula managed to top the try scoring list with some great indidividual efforts leaving some of the world's best wingers behind. His 15 tries in 23 appearances brought UBB close to the playoffs although it wasn't enough in the end.

In autumn 2013 he extended his contract with UBB until 2015 against some expectations that he would join one of the European top clubs at the end of the season.
