= 2011–12 IRB Sevens World Series =

2011–12 IRB Sevens
- Series XIII
- Hosts: Australia; United Arab Emirates; South Africa; New Zealand; United States; Hong Kong; Japan; Scotland; England
- Date: 25 November 2011
- Nations: 30

Final positions
- Champions: New Zealand
- Runners-up: Fiji
- Third: England

Series details
- Top try scorer: (England) Mathew Turner (38 tries)
- Top point scorer: (New Zealand) Tomasi Cama (390 points)

The 2011–12 IRB Sevens World Series, known for sponsorship reasons as the HSBC Sevens World Series, was the 13th annual series of the IRB Sevens World Series tournaments for full national sides run by the International Rugby Board since 1999–2000.

Sevens is traditionally played in a two-day tournament format. However, the most famous event, the Hong Kong Sevens, was played over three days, largely because it involves 24 teams instead of the usual 16. In addition, the USA Sevens were a three-day affair this season despite being a standard 16-team event.

== Itinerary ==
The IRB announced the schedule for the 2011–12 series on 18 August 2011. The most important development was the addition of a leg in Japan, expanding the circuit to nine legs. Two other significant scheduling changes were made. The Australian leg, which had previously followed the Hong Kong Sevens, was now the first event in the series. Also, the last two legs of the series, originally slated for Edinburgh and London, switched places on the schedule, making the London leg the last in the series.

On 13 April 2011, the Australian and South African unions (ARU and SARU, respectively) both announced that their countries' legs of the series would move to new sites effective this season. The ARU announced that its leg would move from Adelaide to the Gold Coast. Initially, the event was called the "International Rugby Sevens Gold Coast", but was later rebranded as simply the "Gold Coast Sevens". The SARU announced that Port Elizabeth would become the new host of the South Africa leg, replacing George.

On 9 December 2011, the IRB and the Scottish Rugby Union announced that the Scotland Sevens, also previously known as the Edinburgh Sevens, would move to Glasgow from the 2012 edition.

2011–12 Itinerary
| Leg | Venue | Date | Winner |
|---|---|---|---|
| Australia | Skilled Park, Gold Coast | 25–26 November 2011 | Fiji |
| Dubai | The Sevens, Dubai | 2–3 December 2011 | England |
| South Africa | Nelson Mandela Bay Stadium, Port Elizabeth | 9–10 December 2011 | New Zealand |
| New Zealand | Westpac Stadium, Wellington | 3–4 February 2012 | New Zealand |
| United States | Sam Boyd Stadium, Las Vegas | 10–12 February 2012 | Samoa |
| Hong Kong | Hong Kong Stadium, Hong Kong | 23–25 March 2012 | Fiji |
| Japan | Chichibunomiya Rugby Stadium, Tokyo | 31 March–1 April 2012 | Australia |
| Scotland | Scotstoun Stadium, Glasgow | 5–6 May 2012 | New Zealand |
| England | Twickenham, London | 12–13 May 2012 | Fiji |

== Women's sevens ==
The 2011 Dubai Sevens saw the IRB organise its first officially sanctioned women's international sevens tournament apart from the Rugby World Cup Sevens. It involved eight teams—Australia, Brazil, Canada, China, England, South Africa, Spain, and the USA—and the semifinals and final were held on the main pitch at The Sevens. This was part of a plan to launch a full IRB International Women's Sevens Series for 2012–13.

== Core teams ==
Before each season, the IRB announces the 12 "core teams" that received guaranteed berths in each event of that season's series. The core teams for 2011–12 were:

- Argentina
- Australia
- England
- Fiji
- France
- Kenya
- New Zealand
- Samoa
- Scotland
- South Africa
- United States
- Wales

The core teams have been unchanged since the 2008–09 series.

== Points schedule ==
The season championship was determined by points earned in each tournament. A new points system, in which each participating team now receives Series points, was introduced shortly before the 2011–12 season kicked off:

16-team events (all except for Hong Kong)

- Cup winner (1st place): 22 points
- Cup runner-up (2nd place): 19 points
- Cup third-place play-off winner (3rd place): 17 points
- Cup third-place play-off loser (4th place): 15 points
- Plate winner (5th place): 13 points
- Plate runner-up (6th place): 12 points
- Losing Plate semi-finalists (joint 7th place): 10 points
- Bowl winner (9th place): 8 points
- Bowl runner-up (10th place): 7 points
- Losing Bowl semi-finalists (joint 11th place): 5 points
- Shield winner (13th place): 3 points
- Shield runner-up (14th place): 2 points
- Losing Shield semi-finalists (joint 15th place): 1 point

24-team event (Hong Kong)

- To be announced

== Tournament structure ==
In all tournaments except Hong Kong, 16 teams participated. Due to its place as the sport's most prestigious annual event, the Hong Kong tournament had 24 teams. In each 16-team tournament, the teams were divided into pools of four teams, who played a round-robin within the pool. Points were awarded in each pool on a different schedule from most rugby tournaments—3 for a win, 2 for a draw, 1 for a loss. In case of a tie on competition points, tiebreakers are applied in the following order:

1. Head-to-head result
2. Difference in points scored in all pool matches
3. Difference in tries scored in all pool matches
4. Total points scored in all pool matches
5. Total tries scored in all pool matches
6. Coin toss

A tie between more than two teams is resolved in the same manner, but without considering head-to-head results.

Four trophies were awarded in each tournament. In descending order of prestige, they were the Cup (overall tournament champion), Plate, Bowl and Shield. Each trophy was awarded at the end of a knockout tournament.

In a 16-team tournament, the top two teams in each pool advanced to the Cup competition. The four quarterfinal losers dropped into the bracket for the Plate. The Bowl was contested by the third- and fourth-place finishers in each pool, with the losers in the Bowl quarterfinals dropping into the bracket for the Shield.

The Hong Kong Sevens used a similar structure, though adjusted for the larger number of teams involved. Its 24 teams were divided into six pools of four teams each, with the competition points system and tiebreakers identical to those for a 16-team event. The six pool winners and the two top second-place finishers advanced to the Cup competition.

- The Plate competition was contested by the losing quarterfinalists from the Cup, as in all other events in the series.
- The Bowl was contested by the four remaining second-place finishers and the top four third-place finishers.
- The Shield was contested by the remaining eight entrants.

== Final standings ==
The points awarded to teams at each event, as well as the overall season totals, are shown in the table below. Gold indicates the event champions. Silver indicates the event runner-ups. Bronze indicates the event third place finishers. A zero (0) is recorded in the event column where a team competed in a tournament but did not gain any points. A dash (–) is recorded in the event column if a team did not compete at a tournament.

2011–12 IRB Sevens – Series XIII
| Pos. | Event Team | Gold Coast | Dubai | Port Elizabeth | Wellington | Las Vegas | Hong Kong | Tokyo | Glasgow | London | Points total |
|---|---|---|---|---|---|---|---|---|---|---|---|
| 1 | New Zealand | 19 | 10 | 22 | 22 | 19 | 19 | 17 | 22 | 17 | 167 |
| 2 | Fiji | 22 | 17 | 12 | 19 | 17 | 22 | 13 | 17 | 22 | 161 |
| 3 | England | 10 | 22 | 15 | 17 | 10 | 15 | 15 | 19 | 12 | 135 |
| 4 | Samoa | 12 | 3 | 17 | 15 | 22 | 13 | 19 | 13 | 19 | 133 |
| 5 | South Africa | 17 | 12 | 19 | 13 | 15 | 17 | 12 | 10 | 10 | 125 |
| 6 | Australia | 15 | 13 | 10 | 7 | 7 | 10 | 22 | 15 | 13 | 112 |
| 7 | Argentina | 8 | 15 | 5 | 5 | 12 | 12 | 10 | 10 | 15 | 92 |
| 8 | Wales | 13 | 10 | 13 | 5 | 10 | 10 | 10 | 12 | 8 | 91 |
| 9 | France | 10 | 19 | 10 | 10 | 3 | 5 | 8 | 5 | 3 | 73 |
| 10 | Scotland | 7 | 8 | 8 | 3 | 2 | 5 | 3 | 5 | 7 | 48 |
| 11 | United States | 5 | 7 | 5 | 1 | 5 | 7 | 7 | 2 | 2 | 41 |
| 12 | Kenya | 1 | 2 | 2 | 8 | 13 | 8 | 2 | 3 | 1 | 40 |
| 13 | Canada | – | 5 | 7 | 10 | 8 | 3 | – | - | – | 33 |
| 14 | Spain | – | - | – | - | – | 2 | – | 7 | 10 | 19 |
| 15 | Portugal | – | 5 | 1 | – | - | 1 | 5 | 1 | 5 | 18 |
| 16 | Tonga | 5 | – | - | 12 | – | 0 | – | - | – | 17 |
| 17 | Russia | – | - | – | - | – | 0 | 1 | 8 | 1 | 10 |
| 17 | Zimbabwe | – | 1 | 3 | – | - | 0 | – | 1 | 5 | 10 |
| 17 | Japan | 2 | – | - | 1 | 5 | 1 | 1 | – | - | 10 |
| 20 | Hong Kong | – | - | – | - | – | 0 | 5 | – | - | 5 |
| 21 | Papua New Guinea | 3 | – | - | – | - | – | - | – | - | 3 |
| 22 | Cook Islands | – | - | – | 2 | – | - | – | - | – | 2 |
| 23 | Uruguay | – | - | – | - | 1 | 0 | – | - | – | 1 |
| 23 | Brazil | – | - | – | - | 1 | – | - | – | - | 1 |
| 23 | United Arab Emirates | – | 1 | – | - | – | - | – | - | – | 1 |
| 23 | Morocco | – | - | 1 | – | - | – | - | – | - | 1 |
| 23 | Niue | 1 | – | - | – | - | – | - | – | - | 1 |
| 28 | China | – | – | - | – | - | 0 | - | – | - | 0 |
| 28 | Guyana | – | – | - | – | - | 0 | - | – | - | 0 |
| 28 | Philippines | – | – | - | – | - | 0 | - | – | - | 0 |

Legend
| Gold | Event Champions |
| Silver | Event Runner-ups |
| Bronze | Event Third place finishers |
Light blue line on the left indicates a core team eligible to participate in all events of the series.

== Player scoring ==
=== Most points ===
Most points
| Pos. | Player | Points |
|---|---|---|
| 1 | Junior Tomasi Cama (NZL) | 390 |
| 2 | Metuisela Talebula (FIJ) | 271 |
| 3 | Colin Gregor (SCO) | 242 |
| 4 | Mathew Turner (ENG) | 194 |
| 5 | Dan Norton (ENG) | 191 |
| 6 | Branco du Preez (RSA) | 175 |
| 7 | Tom Iosefo (SAM) | 167 |
| 8 | Paul Albaladejo (FRA) | 159 |
| 9 | Tom Mitchell (ENG) | 154 |
| 10 | Frank Halai (NZL) | 150 |

=== Most tries ===
Most tries
| Pos. | Player | Tries |
|---|---|---|
| 1 | Mathew Turner (ENG) | 38 |
| 2 | Dan Norton (ENG) | 37 |
| 3 | Junior Tomasi Cama (NZL) | 34 |
| 4 | Tom Iosefo (SAM) | 33 |
| 5 | Frank Halai (NZL) | 30 |
| 6 | James Fleming (SCO) | 29 |
| 7 | Joeli Lutumailagi (FIJ) | 28 |
| 8 | Paul Perez (SAM) | 27 |
| 9 | Richard Smith (WAL) | 26 |
| 10 | Waisea Nayacalevu (FIJ) | 25 |
| 10 | Metuisela Talebula (FIJ) | 25 |

== Tournaments ==
=== Gold Coast ===
| Event | Winners | Score | Finalists | Semi-finalists |
|---|---|---|---|---|
| Cup | Fiji | 26 – 12 | New Zealand | Australia; South Africa |
| Plate | Wales | 26 – 15 | Samoa | England; France |
| Bowl | Argentina | 17 – 14 | Scotland | Tonga; United States |
| Shield | Papua New Guinea | 31 – 19 | Japan | Kenya; Niue |

=== Dubai ===
| Event | Winners | Score | Finalists | Semi-finalists |
|---|---|---|---|---|
| Cup | England | 29 – 12 | France | Argentina; Fiji |
| Plate | Australia | 17 – 14 | South Africa | New Zealand; Wales |
| Bowl | Scotland | 26 – 0 | United States | Canada; Portugal |
| Shield | Samoa | 31 – 17 | Kenya | United Arab Emirates; Zimbabwe |

=== South Africa ===
| Event | Winners | Score | Finalists | Semi-finalists |
|---|---|---|---|---|
| Cup | New Zealand | 31 – 26 | South Africa | England; Samoa |
| Plate | Wales | 48 – 0 | Fiji | Australia; France |
| Bowl | Scotland | 22 – 19 | Canada | Argentina; United States |
| Shield | Zimbabwe | 19 – 12 | Kenya | Morocco; Portugal |

=== Wellington ===
| Event | Winners | Score | Finalists | Semi-finalists |
|---|---|---|---|---|
| Cup | New Zealand | 24 – 7 | Fiji | England; Samoa |
| Plate | South Africa | 24 – 0 | Tonga | Canada; France |
| Bowl | Kenya | 12 – 7 | Australia | Argentina; Wales |
| Shield | Scotland | 19 – 17 | Cook Islands | Japan; United States |

=== United States ===
| Event | Winners | Score | Finalists | Semi-finalists |
|---|---|---|---|---|
| Cup | Samoa | 26 – 19 | New Zealand | Fiji; South Africa |
| Plate | Kenya | 21 – 7 | Argentina | England; Wales |
| Bowl | Canada | 19 – 17 | Australia | Japan; United States |
| Shield | France | 22 – 7 | Scotland | Brazil; Uruguay |

=== Hong Kong ===
| Event | Winners | Score | Finalists | Semi-finalists |
|---|---|---|---|---|
| Cup | Fiji | 35 – 28 | New Zealand | England; South Africa |
| Plate | Samoa | 12 – 10 | Argentina | Australia; Wales |
| Bowl | Kenya | 14 – 12 | United States | France; Scotland |
| Shield | Canada | 22 – 5 | Spain | Japan; Portugal |

=== Japan ===
| Event | Winners | Score | Finalists | Semi-finalists |
|---|---|---|---|---|
| Cup | Australia | 28 – 26 | Samoa | England; New Zealand |
| Plate | Fiji | 14 – 10 | South Africa | Argentina; Wales |
| Bowl | France | 17 – 12 | United States | Hong Kong; Portugal |
| Shield | Scotland | 26 – 12 | Kenya | Japan; Russia |

=== Scotland ===
| Event | Winners | Score | Finalists | Semi-finalists |
|---|---|---|---|---|
| Cup | New Zealand | 29 – 14 | England | Australia; Fiji |
| Plate | Samoa | 31 – 12 | Wales | Argentina; South Africa |
| Bowl | Russia | 33 – 19 | Spain | France; Scotland |
| Shield | Kenya | 22 – 14 | United States | Portugal; Zimbabwe |

=== London ===
| Event | Winners | Score | Finalists | Semi-finalists |
|---|---|---|---|---|
| Cup | Fiji | 38 – 15 | Samoa | Argentina; New Zealand |
| Plate | Australia | 14 – 12 | England | South Africa; Spain |
| Bowl | Wales | 27 – 5 | Scotland | Portugal; Zimbabwe |
| Shield | France | 19 – 12 | United States | Kenya; Russia |
