= 2011 Dubai Sevens =

World Rugby Sevens Series tournament

- Host nation: United Arab Emirates
- Date: 2–3 December 2011

Cup
- Champion: England
- Runner-up: France
- Third: Fiji

Plate
- Winner: Australia
- Runner-up: South Africa

Bowl
- Winner: Scotland
- Runner-up: United States

Shield
- Winner: Samoa
- Runner-up: Kenya

Tournament details
- Matches played: 45
- Tries scored: 277 (average 6.16 per match)
- Most points: (Scotland) Andrew Turnbull (50 points)
- Most tries: (Scotland) Andrew Turnbull (10 tries)

The 2011 Dubai Sevens was the 11th edition of the tournament and was part of the 2011–12 IRB Sevens World Series. It was held in Dubai, United Arab Emirates, at The Sevens stadium.

It was the official debut for the United Arab Emirates national team, the first of several national teams to have been created after the disbanding of the tournament's former host union, the Arabian Gulf Rugby Football Union.

England defended their title by defeating France 29–12 in the final.

Also, it included the first official IRB-sponsored women's sevens event outside of the Rugby World Cup Sevens. Eight national teams competed in the IRB Women's Sevens Challenge Cup — Australia, Brazil, Canada, China, England, South Africa, Spain, and the USA, with the semi-finals and finals played on the main pitch at The Sevens.

Canada won the inaugural event by defeating England in the final 26–7.

== Format ==
The teams were divided into pools of four teams, who played a round-robin within the pool. Points were awarded in each pool on a different schedule from most rugby tournaments—3 for a win, 2 for a draw, 1 for a loss. The top two teams in each pool advanced to the Cup competition. The four quarterfinal losers dropped into the bracket for the Plate. The Bowl was contested by the third- and fourth-place finishers in each pool, with the losers in the Bowl quarterfinals dropping into the bracket for the Shield.

== Teams ==
The participating teams were:

- Argentina
- Australia
- Canada
- England
- Fiji
- France
- Kenya
- New Zealand
- Portugal
- Samoa
- Scotland
- South Africa
- United Arab Emirates
- United States
- Wales
- Zimbabwe

== Pool stage ==
The draw was made on November 26.

Key to colours in group tables
| Teams that advanced to the Cup Quarterfinal |

All times are local (UTC+4).

=== Pool A ===
| Teams | Pld | W | D | L | PF | PA | +/− | Pts |
|---|---|---|---|---|---|---|---|---|
| Fiji | 3 | 3 | 0 | 0 | 114 | 21 | +93 | 9 |
| Argentina | 3 | 1 | 1 | 1 | 108 | 75 | +33 | 6 |
| Samoa | 3 | 1 | 1 | 1 | 97 | 71 | +26 | 6 |
| United Arab Emirates | 3 | 0 | 0 | 3 | 19 | 171 | −152 | 3 |

2 December 2011
10:04

| Fiji | 40 – 7 | Argentina |
| | Report^{[usurped]} |

The Sevens, Dubai

2 December 2011
10:26

| Samoa | 55 – 12 | United Arab Emirates |

The Sevens, Dubai

2 December 2011
13:46

| Fiji | 43 – 0 | United Arab Emirates |

The Sevens, Dubai

2 December 2011
14:08

| Samoa | 28 – 28 | Argentina |
| | Report^{[usurped]} |

The Sevens, Dubai

2 December 2011
17:08

| Argentina | 73 – 7 | United Arab Emirates |
| | Report^{[usurped]} |

The Sevens, Dubai

2 December 2011
19:06

| Fiji | 31 – 14 | Samoa |

The Sevens, Dubai

=== Pool B ===
| Teams | Pld | W | D | L | PF | PA | +/− | Pts |
|---|---|---|---|---|---|---|---|---|
| South Africa | 3 | 3 | 0 | 0 | 74 | 17 | +57 | 9 |
| New Zealand | 3 | 2 | 0 | 1 | 76 | 28 | +48 | 7 |
| Portugal | 3 | 1 | 0 | 2 | 24 | 58 | −34 | 5 |
| United States | 3 | 0 | 0 | 3 | 17 | 88 | −71 | 3 |

2 December 2011
10:48

| New Zealand | 40 – 0 | United States |

The Sevens, Dubai

2 December 2011
11:10

| South Africa | 17 – 5 | Portugal |

The Sevens, Dubai

2 December 2011
14:32

| New Zealand | 31 – 7 | Portugal |

The Sevens, Dubai

2 December 2011
14:54

| South Africa | 36 – 7 | United States |

The Sevens, Dubai

2 December 2011
17:30

| United States | 10 – 12 | Portugal |

The Sevens, Dubai

2 December 2011
19:30

| New Zealand | 5 – 21 | South Africa |
| | Report^{[usurped]} |

The Sevens, Dubai

=== Pool C ===
| Teams | Pld | W | D | L | PF | PA | +/− | Pts |
|---|---|---|---|---|---|---|---|---|
| England | 3 | 3 | 0 | 0 | 91 | 24 | +67 | 9 |
| France | 3 | 2 | 0 | 1 | 65 | 34 | +31 | 7 |
| Zimbabwe | 3 | 1 | 0 | 2 | 21 | 74 | −53 | 5 |
| Kenya | 3 | 0 | 0 | 3 | 22 | 67 | −45 | 3 |

2 December 2011
11:32

| France | 27 – 5 | Kenya |

The Sevens, Dubai

2 December 2011
11:54

| England | 43 – 0 | Zimbabwe |

The Sevens, Dubai

2 December 2011
15:16

| France | 26 – 0 | Zimbabwe |
| | Report^{[usurped]} |

The Sevens, Dubai

2 December 2011
15:38

| England | 19 – 12 | Kenya |
| | Report^{[usurped]} |

The Sevens, Dubai

2 December 2011
18:23

| Kenya | 5 – 21 | Zimbabwe |

The Sevens, Dubai

2 December 2011
19:52

| France | 12 – 29 | England |

The Sevens, Dubai

=== Pool D ===
| Teams | Pld | W | D | L | PF | PA | +/− | Pts |
|---|---|---|---|---|---|---|---|---|
| Wales | 3 | 3 | 0 | 0 | 62 | 33 | +29 | 9 |
| Australia | 3 | 2 | 0 | 1 | 78 | 52 | +26 | 7 |
| Scotland | 3 | 1 | 0 | 2 | 38 | 52 | −14 | 5 |
| Canada | 3 | 0 | 0 | 3 | 33 | 74 | −41 | 3 |

2 December 2011
09:20

| Wales | 14 – 7 | Scotland |
| | Report^{[usurped]} |

The Sevens, Dubai

2 December 2011
09:42

| Australia | 40 – 7 | Canada |
| | Report^{[usurped]} |

The Sevens, Dubai

2 December 2011
13:02

| Wales | 15 – 12 | Canada |

The Sevens, Dubai

2 December 2011
13:24

| Australia | 24 – 12 | Scotland |

The Sevens, Dubai

2 December 2011
16:46

| Scotland | 19 – 14 | Canada |

The Sevens, Dubai

2 December 2011
18:44

| Wales | 33 – 14 | Australia |

The Sevens, Dubai

== Knockout stage ==
=== Shield ===
Quarter-finals
3 December – Dubai
Samoa | 17
Canada | 26
3 December – Dubai
Zimbabwe | 7
United States | 41
3 December – Dubai
Scotland | 40
United Arab Emirates | 5
3 December – Dubai
Portugal | 24
Kenya | 12

Semi-finals
3 December – Dubai
Samoa | 21
Zimbabwe | 12
3 December – Dubai
United Arab Emirates | 5
Kenya | 35

Final
3 December – Dubai
Samoa | 31
Kenya | 17

=== Bowl ===
Quarter-finals
3 December – Dubai
Samoa | 17
Canada | 26
3 December – Dubai
Zimbabwe | 7
United States | 41
3 December – Dubai
Scotland | 40
United Arab Emirates | 5
3 December – Dubai
Portugal | 24
Kenya | 12

Semi-finals
3 December – Dubai
Canada | 17
United States | 33
3 December – Dubai
Scotland | 19
Portugal | 17

Final
3 December – Dubai
United States | 0
Scotland | 26

=== Plate ===
Quarter-finals
3 December – Dubai
Fiji | 34
Australia | 7
3 December – Dubai
England | 10
New Zealand | 7
3 December – Dubai
Wales | 5
Argentina | 7
3 December – Dubai
South Africa | 5
France | 19

Semi-finals
3 December – Dubai
Australia | 26
New Zealand | 12
3 December – Dubai
Wales | 7
South Africa | 22

Final
3 December – Dubai
Australia | 17
South Africa | 14

=== Cup ===
Quarter-finals
3 December – Dubai
Fiji | 34
Australia | 7
3 December – Dubai
England | 10
New Zealand | 7
3 December – Dubai
Wales | 5
Argentina | 7
3 December – Dubai
South Africa | 5
France | 19

Semi-finals
3 December – Dubai
Fiji | 12
England | 19
3 December – Dubai
Argentina | 5
France | 24

Final
3 December – Dubai
England | 29
France | 12
Third place
3 December – Dubai
Fiji | 26
Argentina | 21
