= 2012 Dubai Sevens =

World Rugby Sevens Series tournament

- Host nation: United Arab Emirates
- Date: 30 November – 1 December 2012

Cup
- Champion: Samoa
- Runner-up: New Zealand
- Third: Kenya

Plate
- Winner: Wales
- Runner-up: Canada

Bowl
- Winner: Argentina
- Runner-up: South Africa

Shield
- Winner: England
- Runner-up: Spain

Tournament details
- Matches played: 45
- Tries scored: 217 (average 4.82 per match)
- Most points: (Canada) Nathan Hirayama (51 points)
- Most tries: (England) Dan Norton (Kenya) Collins Injera (New Zealand) Kurt Baker (Samoa) Paul Perez (6 tries)

The 2012 Dubai Sevens was held on 30 November and 1 December 2012 at The Sevens Stadium in Dubai. It was the 24th edition of the tournament and the second stop of the 2012–13 IRB Sevens World Series.

Samoa defeated New Zealand 26–15 in the final to win the title.

== Format ==
The teams were drawn into four pools of four teams each. Each team played everyone in their pool one time. The top two teams from each pool advanced to the Cup/Plate brackets. The bottom two teams from each group went to the Bowl/Shield brackets.

== Pool Stage ==
Key to colours in group tables
Teams that advance to the Cup Quarterfinal

=== Pool A ===
Team	Pld	W	D	L	PF	PA	PD	Pts
Fiji	3	3	0	0	50	24	+26	9
Kenya	3	2	0	1	32	26	+6	7
Spain	3	1	0	2	19	31	−12	5
Scotland	3	0	0	3	26	46	−20	3

30 November 2012
09:50

Fiji	14 – 0	Spain

The Sevens Stadium

30 November 2012
10:12

Kenya	12 – 5	Scotland
	Report

The Sevens Stadium

30 November 2012
13:36

Fiji	22 – 14	Scotland

The Sevens Stadium

30 November 2012
13:58

Kenya	10 – 7	Spain
	Report

The Sevens Stadium

30 November 2012
17:00

Spain	12 – 7	Scotland
	Report

The Sevens Stadium

30 November 2012
18:58

Fiji	14 – 10	Kenya
	Report

The Sevens Stadium

=== Pool B ===
Team	Pld	W	D	L	PF	PA	PD	Pts
New Zealand	3	3	0	0	62	28	+34	9
Wales	3	2	0	1	43	26	+17	7
Argentina	3	1	0	2	31	41	−10	5
Russia	3	0	0	3	29	70	−41	3

30 November 2012
10:36

New Zealand	14 – 7	Wales

The Sevens Stadium

30 November 2012
10:58

Argentina	17 – 10	Russia
	Report

The Sevens Stadium

30 November 2012
14:22

New Zealand	31 – 14	Russia
	Report

The Sevens Stadium

30 November 2012
14:44

Argentina	7 – 14	Wales
	Report

The Sevens Stadium

30 November 2012
17:22

Wales	22 – 5	Russia

The Sevens Stadium

30 November 2012
19:22

New Zealand	17 – 7	Argentina
	Report

The Sevens Stadium

=== Pool C ===
Team	Pld	W	D	L	PF	PA	PD	Pts
Samoa	3	2	0	1	51	43	+8	7
Portugal	3	2	0	1	53	55	−2	7
South Africa	3	1	0	2	34	32	+2	5
England	3	1	0	2	50	58	−8	5

30 November 2012
11:20

South Africa	19 – 10	England
	Report

The Sevens Stadium

30 November 2012
11:44

Samoa	24 – 19	Portugal
	Report

The Sevens Stadium

30 November 2012
15:06

South Africa	10 – 12	Portugal
	Report

The Sevens Stadium

30 November 2012
15:28

Samoa	17 – 19	England
	Report

The Sevens Stadium

30 November 2012
17:44

England	21 – 22	Portugal
	Report

The Sevens Stadium

30 November 2012
19:44

South Africa	5 – 10	Samoa
	Report

The Sevens Stadium

=== Pool D ===
Team	Pld	W	D	L	PF	PA	PD	Pts
Canada	3	2	1	0	74	35	+39	8
France	3	2	0	1	24	34	−10	7
Australia	3	1	1	1	47	47	0	6
United States	3	0	0	3	33	62	−29	3

30 November 2012
09:06

France	0 – 20	Canada

The Sevens Stadium

30 November 2012
09:28

Australia	19 – 12	United States
	Report

The Sevens Stadium

30 November 2012
12:52

France	17 – 14	United States

The Sevens Stadium

30 November 2012
13:14

Australia	28 – 28	Canada

The Sevens Stadium

30 November 2012
16:38

Canada	26 – 7	United States
	Report

The Sevens Stadium

30 November 2012
18:36

France	7 – 0	Australia
	Report

The Sevens Stadium

== Knockout stage ==
=== Shield (13th place) ===
Quarter-finals
1 December – Dubai
Spain	12
United States	14
1 December – Dubai
South Africa	25
Russia	12
1 December – Dubai
Australia	14
Scotland	29
1 December – Dubai
Argentina	24
England	14

Semi-finals
1 December – Dubai
Spain	26
Russia	24
1 December – Dubai
Australia	12
England	40

Final
1 December – Dubai
Spain	5
England	26

=== Bowl (9th place) ===
Quarter-finals
1 December – Dubai
Spain	12
United States	14
1 December – Dubai
South Africa	25
Russia	12
1 December – Dubai
Australia	14
Scotland	29
1 December – Dubai
Argentina	24
England	14

Semi-finals
1 December – Dubai
United States	14
South Africa	22
1 December – Dubai
Scotland	5
Argentina	12

Final
1 December – Dubai
South Africa	10
Argentina	14

=== Plate (5th place) ===
Quarter-finals
1 December – Dubai
Fiji	5
France	8
1 December – Dubai
Samoa	19
Wales	7
1 December – Dubai
Canada	7
Kenya	19
1 December – Dubai
New Zealand	28
Portugal	7

Semi-finals
1 December – Dubai
Fiji	5
Wales	27
1 December – Dubai
Canada	28
Portugal	12

Final
1 December – Dubai
Wales	21
Canada	14

=== Cup (1st place) ===
Quarter-finals
1 December – Dubai
Fiji	5
France	8
1 December – Dubai
Samoa	19
Wales	7
1 December – Dubai
Canada	7
Kenya	19
1 December – Dubai
New Zealand	28
Portugal	7

Semi-finals
1 December – Dubai
France	5
Samoa	12
1 December – Dubai
Kenya	7
New Zealand	27

Final
1 December – Dubai
Samoa	26
New Zealand	15
Third place
1 December – Dubai
France	12
Kenya	15
