= 2012 Scotland Sevens =

Rugby sevens tournament

- Host nation: Scotland
- Date: 5–6 May 2012

Cup
- Champion: New Zealand
- Runner-up: England
- Third: Fiji

Plate
- Winner: Samoa
- Runner-up: Wales

Bowl
- Winner: Russia
- Runner-up: Spain

Shield
- Winner: Kenya
- Runner-up: United States

Tournament details
- Matches played: 45
- Tries scored: 258 (average 5.73 per match)
- Most points: (Fiji) Metuisela Talebula (88 points)
- Most tries: (New Zealand) Waisake Naholo (Fiji) Metuisela Talebula (England) Mathew Turner (8 tries)

The 2012 Scotland Sevens was the sixth edition of the tournament previously known as the Edinburgh Sevens. It was the eighth tournament within the 2011–12 IRB Sevens World Series. The host stadium was the Scotstoun Stadium.

New Zealand won the title by defeating England 29–14 in the final.

== Format ==
The teams were divided into pools of four teams, who played a round-robin within the pool. Points were awarded in each pool on a different schedule from most rugby tournaments—3 for a win, 2 for a draw, 1 for a loss. The top two teams in each pool advanced to the Cup competition. The four quarterfinal losers dropped into the bracket for the Plate. The Bowl was contested by the third- and fourth-place finishers in each pool, with the losers in the Bowl quarterfinals dropping into the bracket for the Shield.

== Teams ==
The participating teams were:

- Argentina
- Australia
- England
- Fiji
- France
- Kenya
- New Zealand
- Portugal
- Russia
- Samoa
- Scotland
- South Africa
- Spain
- United States
- Wales
- Zimbabwe

== Pool stage ==
The draw was made on 1 April.

Key to colours in group tables
Teams that advanced to the Cup Quarterfinal

=== Pool A ===
Teams	Pld	W	D	L	PF	PA	+/−	Pts
England	3	3	0	0	78	33	+45	9
Australia	3	2	0	1	71	59	+12	7
United States	3	1	0	2	55	62	−7	5
Kenya	3	0	0	3	47	97	−50	3

5 May 2012
12:42

Australia	29 – 14	United States
	Report

Scotstoun Stadium, Glasgow

5 May 2012
13:04

England	40 – 7	Kenya
	Report

Scotstoun Stadium, Glasgow

5 May 2012
15:48

Australia	28 – 26	Kenya

Scotstoun Stadium, Glasgow

5 May 2012
16:10

England	19 – 12	United States
	Report

Scotstoun Stadium, Glasgow

5 May 2012
18:15

United States	29 – 14	Kenya
	Report

Scotstoun Stadium, Glasgow

5 May 2012
19:21

Australia	14 – 19	England
	Report

Scotstoun Stadium, Glasgow

=== Pool B ===
Teams	Pld	W	D	L	PF	PA	+/−	Pts
New Zealand	3	3	0	0	119	26	+93	9
Samoa	3	2	0	1	67	53	+14	7
Spain	3	1	0	2	41	62	−21	5
France	3	0	0	3	21	107	−86	3

5 May 2012
10:30

Samoa	22 – 14	France
	Report

Scotstoun Stadium, Glasgow

5 May 2012
10:52

New Zealand	31 – 5	Spain
	Report

Scotstoun Stadium, Glasgow

5 May 2012
13:36

Samoa	24 – 17	Spain

Scotstoun Stadium, Glasgow

5 May 2012
13:58

New Zealand	66 – 0	France
	Report

Scotstoun Stadium, Glasgow

5 May 2012
16:47

France	7 – 19	Spain

Scotstoun Stadium, Glasgow

5 May 2012
17:31

Samoa	21 – 22	New Zealand
	Report

Scotstoun Stadium, Glasgow

=== Pool C ===
Teams	Pld	W	D	L	PF	PA	+/−	Pts
Fiji	3	3	0	0	115	12	+103	9
Argentina	3	2	0	1	43	66	−23	7
Portugal	3	1	0	2	34	59	−25	5
Zimbabwe	3	0	0	3	28	83	−55	3

5 May 2012
11:14

Argentina	17 – 5	Portugal

Scotstoun Stadium, Glasgow

5 May 2012
11:36

Fiji	40 – 0	Zimbabwe

Scotstoun Stadium, Glasgow

5 May 2012
14:20

Argentina	19 – 14	Zimbabwe

Scotstoun Stadium, Glasgow

5 May 2012
14:42

Fiji	28 – 5	Portugal
	Report

Scotstoun Stadium, Glasgow

5 May 2012
17:09

Portugal	24 – 14	Zimbabwe

Scotstoun Stadium, Glasgow

5 May 2012
18:37

Argentina	7 – 47	Fiji
	Report

Scotstoun Stadium, Glasgow

=== Pool D ===
Teams	Pld	W	D	L	PF	PA	+/−	Pts
Wales	3	3	0	0	65	24	+41	9
South Africa	3	2	0	1	41	45	−4	7
Scotland	3	1	0	2	61	41	+20	5
Russia	3	0	0	3	24	81	−57	3

5 May 2012
11:58

Wales	17 – 14	Scotland

Scotstoun Stadium, Glasgow

5 May 2012
12:20

South Africa	17 – 14	Russia
	Report

Scotstoun Stadium, Glasgow

5 May 2012
15:04

South Africa	19 – 14	Scotland
	Report

Scotstoun Stadium, Glasgow

5 May 2012
15:26

Wales	31 – 5	Russia

Scotstoun Stadium, Glasgow

5 May 2012
17:53

Scotland	33 – 5	Russia

Scotstoun Stadium, Glasgow

5 May 2012
18:59

Wales	17 – 5	South Africa

Scotstoun Stadium, Glasgow

== Knockout stage ==
=== Shield ===
Quarter-finals
6 May – Glasgow
United States	21
Russia	22
6 May – Glasgow
Portugal	5
France	7
6 May – Glasgow
Scotland	19
Kenya	12
6 May – Glasgow
Spain	14
Zimbabwe	7

Semi-finals
6 May – Glasgow
United States	17
Portugal	14
6 May – Glasgow
Kenya	24
Zimbabwe	7

Final
6 May – Glasgow
United States	14
Kenya	22

=== Bowl ===
Quarter-finals
6 May – Glasgow
United States	21
Russia	22
6 May – Glasgow
Portugal	5
France	7
6 May – Glasgow
Scotland	19
Kenya	12
6 May – Glasgow
Spain	14
Zimbabwe	7

Semi-finals
6 May – Glasgow
Russia	12
France	10
6 May – Glasgow
Scotland	7
Spain	10

Final
6 May – Glasgow
Russia	33
Spain	19

=== Plate ===
Quarter-finals
6 May – Glasgow
England	19
South Africa	14
6 May – Glasgow
Fiji	34
Samoa	10
6 May – Glasgow
Wales	7
Australia	17
6 May – Glasgow
New Zealand	36
Argentina	5

Semi-finals
6 May – Glasgow
South Africa	0
Samoa	47
6 May – Glasgow
Wales	12
Argentina	5

Final
6 May – Glasgow
Samoa	31
Wales	12

=== Cup ===
Quarter-finals
6 May – Glasgow
England	19
South Africa	14
6 May – Glasgow
Fiji	34
Samoa	10
6 May – Glasgow
Wales	7
Australia	17
6 May – Glasgow
New Zealand	36
Argentina	5

Semi-finals
6 May – Glasgow
England	26
Fiji	21
6 May – Glasgow
Australia	7
New Zealand	22

Final
6 May – Glasgow
England	14
New Zealand	29
Third place
6 May – Glasgow
Fiji	31
Australia	17
