= Henley Bank High School =

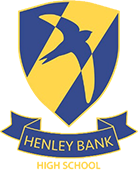

Location
- Mill Lane, Brockworth; Gloucester, Gloucestershire, GL3 4QF; England; 51°50′53″N 2°08′56″W

Information
- Type: Academy
- Established: 1967
- Department for Education URN: 145480 Tables
- Ofsted: Reports
- Head teacher: Stephen Derry
- Age: 11 to 18
- Enrolment: 600
- Houses: Dowty, Jenner, Hill, Holst
- Website: http://www.henleybankhighschool.co.uk/

Henley Bank High School is an 11 to 18 academy in Gloucester, England. It is sponsored by the Greenshaw Learning Trust. In January 2018, the school was taken over by Greenshaw Learning Trust, in order to assist in improving aspects of the school - this resulted in a name change from Millbrook Academy to Henley Bank High School. The Headteacher is Stephen Derry supported by Executive Head and Director of School Improvement at the Greenshaw Learning Trust, Izzy Ambrose.

== About the school ==
The Brockworth Comprehensive school was founded in 1967, situated on countryside overlooked by the Cotswold Hills. The school served the catchment areas of Brockworth, Hucclecote, Upton St Leonards, the eastern suburbs of the City of Gloucester and the rural areas to the east extending up onto the Cotswold Hills.

In 2010 OFSTED stated that Brockworth Enterprise School was inadequate and placed it in special measures. In order to put the special measures behind it, the school converted to an academy with Academies Enterprise Trust as the Sponsor. AET had hoped originally hoped to also be involved in the running of Gloucester Academy, with David Fuller from AET taking over at Gloucester College as Executive Principal.

In 2012 Gloucestershire County Council funded a £3.4m development of science labs and other teaching facilities. Immediately after this redevelopment the school transferred into the Academies Enterprise Trust and renamed the school Millbrook Academy.

In 2014 there was a proposal to build and open a new school (Greenfield Academy) for children with behavioural difficulties on land adjoining Millbrook Academy. The new proposed school would have been a partnership between Academies Enterprise Trust and Gloucestershire County Council Malcolm Reeve on behalf of AET initially spoke of the plans for the new school to work closely with Millbrook, but AET was then banned by the Department for Education from expanding until it could raise standards in the Academies which it already had. When local residents objected to the proposed new school, AET was unavailable to comment.

The headteacher up until September 2009 was Paul Elliott. He was replaced by Jan Scott, who had previously been a deputy headteacher at Merchants Academy in Bristol. She remained in post until a disappointing OFSTED in February 2015. A new interim principal, Roger Gilbert, took over. He had previously worked at Yate International Academy In October 2015 Libby Nicholas, the AET Southern Regional Director of Education wrote to parents to confirm that the new Principal from January 2016 would be Lesley Moule, supported by Dean Anderson as Executive Principal (From Sept 2015).

In 2018, the school transitioned to a new Multi Academy Trust - Greenshaw Learning Trust. With this there was a name change to Henley Bank High School, a new behavior system, and a new uniform and badge. Bradley Nash became headteacher from 2018 until 2020, after which Stephen Derry was appointed and is the current headteacher.

Noted alumni include English actor, comedian, screenwriter, and producer Simon Pegg.

== Academic standards prior to transition as Henley Bank High School ==
5GCSES A-C (including English and Maths) accurate as of Nov 2015 and taken from School and College Performance Tables
Academy Name	2011	2012	2013	2014	2015	OFSTED Grade	DfE Warning or Pre Warning
Millbrook Academy	55%	51%	54%	24%	27%	Requires Improvement	20 Oct 2015
Henley Bank High School						Good (2022)	
National Maintained Schools	59%	59%	60%	57%	56%		

This table shows data marked in darker grey which relates to the period of time before the school became an AET Academy. Exam results marked in red are those which fall below the minimum standards expected by the Department for Education floor target, The OFSTED grade is marked red if it indicates that the school needs to improve. If the school has a letter from the Department for Education stating that standards are 'unacceptably low' that is also marked in red.

The first set of results after converting from Brockworth school and becoming Millbrook Academy were lauded in the local community, with strong A level results, and equally strong GCSE results. The Principal Jan Scott stated

We are extremely proud of the summer exam results. They clearly reflect the excellent learning attitudes of our students. The results are a credit to both students and staff who work so incredibly hard. Millbrook Academy continues to offer a curriculum that enables students to flourish and to achieve their full potential.

However the data table above shows that over time Millbrook results have declined very considerably, to the point that in 2015 the academy initially did not want to release its exam results when other local schools were doing so.

In 2013 OFSTED noted concerns about the teaching of Maths and stated more generally:

There is too much variability in the quality of teaching, including in the sixth form. Over time, teaching has not been sufficiently good to ensure that students make good progress, particularly in mathematics. While inspectors saw examples of good and elements of outstanding practice, this is not prevalent across the school and, as a result, students' progress in some lessons is limited.

In 2014 OFSTED noted improvements had occurred, but also that aspects of poor student behaviour were continuing to hold back further attempts to raise standards.

However, the attitudes and behaviour of a small minority of students in too many lessons still requires improvement. Where poor behaviour was observed, it was often a consequence of weaknesses in planning and teaching. Those students showing poor behaviour were often unclear about what they were meant to be doing; had difficulty with the work because, for example, their low reading ages had not been taken into account; or were responding to provocations from other students that had not been dealt with effectively by the teacher

In 2015 the Regional Schools' commissioner wrote to Ian Comfort the CEO of Academies Enterprise Trust stating that the educational standards are unacceptably low at Millbrook Academy. He stated:

while the academy has improved aspects of educational provision, further improvement is needed and the rate of improvement is too slow... it was clear that improvements were being made but significant issues remain and are likely to continue for the foreseeable future...

Parental ranking of the school placed it as 12th in the local area. Parents interviewed by the local media expressed concerns about exam results and other aspects, stating

It is not just these figures that are a growing concern, it is the amount of supply teachers that my child has had and the behaviour is appalling with swearing and generally unruly behaviour."

In December 2015 a teacher of the academy spoke out in public about poor standards, stating

We're disappointed the results are catastrophically bad again, but we as a staff we knew it was going to happen... Children's chances of a better life are being ruined. Our community deserves better than this.

Mike Barnett, speaking on behalf of the Academies Enterprise Trust responded to the public criticism of standards at the academy by saying that "raising standards quickly at the school was the highest priority."

== Ofsted 2022 ==
In June 2022 Henley Bank High School was inspected by Ofsted under Section 5 of the Education Act. It was announced a few weeks later that the school had been rated 'Good' in all areas by Ofsted.

Staff are supportive of pupils' well-being. One example is how the school have created the role of pupil mental health ambassadors. They are having a positive impact on how other pupils feel. Pupils can attend clubs, such as golf and Pride, and become green influencers. Pupils with SEND have access to a broad and balanced curriculum. They work in partnership with staff to ensure their needs are met. For example, they are involved in writing the plans that teachers use to support them. Leaders ensure that pupils with specific needs have a calm and focused start to every school day through the 'Positive Start' programme.

- Quote from 2022 Ofsted Inspection Report
