= Frank Horne (footballer) =

Australian rules footballer, born 1905

Personal information
- Full name: Francis Michael Horne
- Born: 18 October 1905; Richmond, Victoria
- Died: 18 September 1958 (aged 52); Camberwell, Victoria
- Original team: St Ignatius
- Height: 180 cm (5 ft 11 in)
- Weight: 92 kg (203 lb)

Playing career^{1}
Years	Club	Games (Goals)
1925	Richmond	2 (0)
1929–30	Hawthorn	10 (1)
Total		12 (1)
- ^{1} Playing statistics correct to the end of 1930.

Francis Michael Horne (18 October 1905 – 18 September 1958), commonly known as Frank Horn, was an Australian rules footballer who played with Richmond and Hawthorn in the Victorian Football League (VFL).

Horne, began his football career with the Richmond Football Club, where he played various positions on the field. After several successful seasons with Richmond, Horne moved to Hawthorn. He often played as a midfielder, half-forward, or half-back, depending on the team's needs. He died on 18 September 1958.
