= Andrew Turnbull (rugby union) =

Scottish rugby union player

- Born: 5 April 1982 (age 44)
- Height: 5 ft 7 in (1.70 m)
- Weight: 12 st (76 kg; 170 lb)
- School: George Watson's College
- University: Edinburgh Napier University

Rugby union career
- Position: Wing
Senior career
Years	Team	Apps	(Points)
2003–04	Border Reivers	1	(5)
2007–12	Edinburgh	42	(40)
International career
Years	Team	Apps	(Points)
	Scotland A	3	
–	Scotland U21	7	
National sevens team
Years	Team		Comps
2004–15	Scotland 7s		62

Andrew Turnbull (born 5 April 1982, Edinburgh) is a retired Scottish rugby sevens player. He represented both Scotland and Great Britain at rugby sevens, including the 2006 Commonwealth Games. He scored more tries for Scotland in sevens than any other player, including 19 in 2005 and 118 tries on the HSBC Sevens World Series alone. Turnbull also played for Watsonians and the Scottish Institute of Sport, and played for Scotland U19, Scotland U21, and the Barbarian F.C.

== Biography ==
Turnbull was educated at George Watson's College.

Turnbull was one of the first professional sevens players when Graham Shiel named him in his 2011–12 Scotland 7s squad, and he remained a core player with Scotland 7s under Phil Greening on the 2012–13 circuit.

As well as Scotland 7s, Turnbull has representative honours with Scotland A and was also contracted to Edinburgh Rugby prior to signing with the national squad.

The winger scored 151 tries and one conversion – against Argentina on the Gold Coast in 2013 – in 57 World Series events from 2004 to 2014, as well as playing in three Rugby World Cup 7s (Hong Kong 2005, Dubai 2009, Moscow 2013) and two Commonwealth Games (Melbourne 2006 and Delhi 2010).

He retired from playing in 2015.

Turnbull became a rugby coach at St Leonards School in St Andrews, Fife.
