= 2012–13 IRB Sevens World Series =

2012–13 World Rugby Sevens
- Series XIV
- Hosts: Australia; United Arab Emirates; South Africa; New Zealand; United States; Hong Kong; Japan; Scotland; England
- Date: 13 Oct 2012 – 12 May 2013
- Nations: 22

Final positions
- Champions: New Zealand
- Runners-up: South Africa
- Third: Fiji

Series details
- Top try scorer: (England) Dan Norton (52 tries)
- Top point scorer: (England) Dan Norton (264 points)

The 2012–13 IRB Sevens World Series, known for sponsorship reasons as the HSBC Sevens World Series, was the 14th annual series of rugby sevens tournaments for full national sides. The IRB Sevens World Series has been run by the International Rugby Board since 1999–2000.

== Itinerary ==
The schedule for the 2012–13 series was released in late June 2012. At the time, the schedule included a new event to be held in La Plata, Argentina. However, on 16 August, the Argentine Rugby Union pulled out of hosting an event in 2012–13, citing demands associated with the country's 2012 entry into The Rugby Championship.

2012–13 Itinerary
Leg	Venue	Date	Winner
Australia	Skilled Park, Gold Coast	13–14 October 2012	Fiji
Dubai	The Sevens, Dubai	30 Nov–1 Dec 2012	Samoa
South Africa	Nelson Mandela Bay Stadium, Port Elizabeth	8–9 December 2012	New Zealand
New Zealand	Westpac Stadium, Wellington	1–2 February 2013	England
United States	Sam Boyd Stadium, Las Vegas	8–10 February 2013	South Africa
Hong Kong	Hong Kong Stadium, Hong Kong	22–24 March 2013	Fiji
Japan	Chichibunomiya Rugby Stadium, Tokyo	30–31 March 2013	South Africa
Scotland	Scotstoun Stadium. Glasgow	4–5 May 2013	South Africa
England	Twickenham, London	11–12 May 2013	New Zealand

== Core teams ==
Before each season, the IRB announces the "core teams" that received guaranteed berths in each event of that season's series. This was the first series in which 15 teams received this status, up from 12 in the recent past. All 12 core teams from 2011–12 retained their status, with three more being elevated as top finishers in a 12-team qualifying tournament conducted as part of the 2012 Hong Kong Sevens. The 2012–13 core teams are:

- Argentina
- Australia
- Canada
- England
- Fiji
- France
- Kenya
- New Zealand
- Portugal
- Samoa
- Scotland
- South Africa
- Spain
- United States
- Wales

=== Promotion and relegation ===
For the first time, the IRB instituted a formal promotion and relegation process for core team status in the Sevens World Series, replacing the former ad hoc process. The top 12 core teams in the season table after the next-to-last round of the series in Glasgow retained their status for 2013–14. The remaining three core teams for 2013–14 are being determined in a two-stage qualifying process:

- The first stage was a World Series Pre-Qualifier held as part of the 2013 Hong Kong Sevens. Two qualifiers from each of the IRB's six regions competed. The 12 teams were drawn into three pools, with the top two teams from each pool, plus the top two runners-up, advancing to a quarterfinal round. The winners of the four quarterfinal matches (Russia, Zimbabwe, Tonga, and Georgia) advanced to the second stage.
- The final stage, the World Series Core Team Qualifier, was held as part of the 2013 London Sevens. The pre-qualifiers were joined by Hong Kong, which earned its spot by winning the HSBC Asian Sevens Series, plus the bottom three core teams following the Scotland Sevens. The qualifier was conducted with a pool stage followed by knockout play, with the two finalists and the winner of the third-place match becoming 2013–14 core teams.

== Final standings ==
The points awarded to teams at each event, as well as the overall season totals, are shown in the table below. Gold indicates the event champions. Silver indicates the event runner-ups. Bronze indicates the event third place finishers. A zero (0) is recorded in the event column where a team competed in a tournament but did not gain any points. A dash (–) is recorded in the event column if a team did not compete at a tournament.

2012–13 IRB Sevens – Series XIV
Pos.	Event Team	Gold Coast	Dubai	Port Elizabeth	Wellington	Las Vegas	Hong Kong	Tokyo	Glasgow	London	Points total
1	New Zealand	19	19	22	17	19	17	19	19	22	173
2	South Africa	17	7	17	10	22	5	22	22	10	132
3	Fiji	22	10	12	7	15	22	10	10	13	121
4	Samoa	10	22	7	15	17	13	10	5	5	104
5	Kenya	15	17	5	19	1	15	5	7	15	99
6	England	7	3	5	22	5	8	8	17	17	92
7	Wales	5	13	13	3	10	19	5	15	8	91
8	Australia	10	1	8	13	3	10	17	8	19	89
9	France	12	15	19	5	8	3	15	3	7	87
10	Argentina	13	8	15	10	7	2	7	12	10	84
11	United States	2	5	10	1	10	5	13	13	12	71
12	Canada	5	12	1	8	13	12	3	10	5	69
13	Scotland	3	5	1	12	12	1	12	5	–	51
14	Portugal	1	10	10	1	1	10	1	1	–	35
15	Spain	8	2	3	5	5	1	1	1	–	26
16	Hong Kong	–	–	–	–	–	7	–	–	–	7
17	Tonga	1	–	–	2	–	–	–	–	–	3
18	Russia	–	1	–	–	–	–	–	2	–	3
19	Japan	–	–	–	–	–	–	2	–	–	2
20	Uruguay	–	–	–	–	2	–	–	–	–	2
21	Zimbabwe	–	–	2	–	–	–	–	–	–	2
22	Georgia	–	–	–	–	–	–	–	–	–	0

Source: rugby7.com (archived)

Legend
Gold	Event Champions
Silver	Event Runner-ups
Bronze	Event Third place finishers
No colour	Core team in 2012–13 and re-qualified for 2013–14
Yellow	Invited team
Blue bar	Re-qualified for 2013–14 via the 2013 London Sevens core team qualifier tournament
Red bar	Failed to qualify for 2013–14 via 2013 London Sevens core team qualifier tournament

== Player statistics ==
=== Points scored ===
Points scored
Pos.	Player	Points
1	Dan Norton (ENG)	264
2	Joji Baleviani Raqamate (FIJ)	247
3	Nathan Hirayama (CAN)	241
4	Junior Tomasi Cama (NZL)	237
5	Christian Lewis-Pratt (ENG)	221
6	Cornal Hendricks (RSA)	190
7	Terry Bouhraoua (FRA)	189
8	Lewis Holland (AUS)	187
9	Paul Albaladejo (FRA)	180
10	Sean Duke (CAN)	175

=== Tries scored ===
Tries scored
Pos.	Player	Tries
1	Dan Norton (ENG)	52
2	Cornal Hendricks (RSA)	38
3	Sean Duke (CAN)	35
4	Lewis Holland (AUS)	29
5	Samisoni Viriviri (FIJ)	29
6	Marcus Watson (ENG)	27
7	Tim Mikkelson (NZL)	26
8	Kurt Baker (NZL)	25
8	Julien Candelon (FRA)	25
8	Joji Baleviani Raqamate (FIJ)	25

== Tournaments ==
=== Gold Coast ===
Event	Winners	Score	Finalists	Semifinalists
Cup	Fiji	32–14	New Zealand	Kenya; South Africa
Plate	Argentina	14–7	France	Australia; Samoa
Bowl	Spain	19–14	England	Canada; Wales
Shield	Scotland	40–5	United States	Portugal; Tonga

=== Dubai ===
Event	Winners	Score	Finalists	Semifinalists
Cup	Samoa	26–15	New Zealand	France; Kenya
Plate	Wales	21–14	Canada	Fiji; Portugal
Bowl	Argentina	14–10	South Africa	Scotland; United States
Shield	England	26–5	Spain	Australia; Russia

=== South Africa ===
Event	Winners	Score	Finalists	Semifinalists
Cup	New Zealand	47–12	France	Argentina; South Africa
Plate	Wales	26–14	Fiji	Portugal; United States
Bowl	Australia	26–14	Samoa	England; Kenya
Shield	Spain	33–0	Zimbabwe	Canada; Scotland

=== Wellington ===
Event	Winners	Score	Finalists	Semifinalists
Cup	England	24–19	Kenya	New Zealand; Samoa
Plate	Australia	22–7	Scotland	Argentina; South Africa
Bowl	Canada	28–19	Fiji	France; Spain
Shield	Wales	26–21	Tonga	Portugal; United States

=== United States ===
Event	Winners	Score	Finalists	Semifinalists
Cup	South Africa	40–21	New Zealand	Fiji; Samoa
Plate	Canada	22–5	Scotland	United States; Wales
Bowl	France	17–12	Argentina	England; Spain
Shield	Australia	41–0	Uruguay	Kenya; Portugal

=== Hong Kong ===
Event	Winners	Score	Finalists	Semifinalists
Cup	Fiji	26–19	Wales	New Zealand; Kenya
Plate	Samoa	12–7	Canada	Australia; Portugal
Bowl	England	42–7	Hong Kong	United States; South Africa
Shield	France	19–14	Argentina	Scotland; Spain
World Series pre-qualifier	Zimbabwe	22–19	Tonga	Russia; Georgia

=== Japan ===
Event	Winners	Score	Finalists	Semifinalists
Cup	South Africa	24–19	New Zealand	Australia; France
Plate	United States	17–0	Scotland	Fiji; Samoa
Bowl	England	38–0	Argentina	Kenya; Wales
Shield	Canada	27–14	Japan	Portugal; Spain

=== Scotland ===
Event	Winners	Score	Finalists	Semifinalists
Cup	South Africa	28–21	New Zealand	England; Wales
Plate	United States	17–7	Argentina	Canada; Fiji
Bowl	Australia	12–5	Kenya	Samoa; Scotland
Shield	France	21–17	Russia	Portugal; Spain

=== London ===
Event	Winners	Score	Finalists	Semifinalists
Cup	New Zealand	47–12	Australia	England; Kenya
Plate	Fiji	14–5	United States	Argentina; South Africa
Bowl	Wales	19–7	France	Canada; Samoa

== Dream Team ==
The 2012–13 HSBC Sevens World Series 'Dream Team' was selected by the series' regular television broadcast commentators.

- (Samoa) Afa Aiono
- (South Africa) Frankie Horne
- (New Zealand) Tim Mikkelson
- (Fiji) Joji Ragamate
- (New Zealand) Gilles Kaka
- (Kenya) Willy Ambaka
- (England) Dan Norton
