= 2013 Wellington Sevens =

Rugby competition in Wellington, New Zealand

- Host nation: New Zealand
- Date: 1–2 February 2013

Cup
- Champion: England
- Runner-up: Kenya
- Third: New Zealand

Plate
- Winner: Australia
- Runner-up: Scotland

Bowl
- Winner: Canada
- Runner-up: Fiji

Shield
- Winner: Wales
- Runner-up: Tonga

Tournament details
- Matches played: 45
- Tries scored: 246 (average 5.47 per match)
- Most points: (England) Christian Lewis-Pratt (51 points)
- Most tries: (France) Julien Candelon (9 tries)

The 2013 Wellington Sevens was the 14th edition of the tournament as part of the 2012–13 IRB Sevens World Series. It was hosted in Wellington, New Zealand, at the Westpac Stadium.

England defeated Kenya 24–19 in the final to win the title.

== Format ==
The teams were divided into pools of four teams, who played a round-robin within the pool. Points were awarded in each pool on a different schedule from most rugby tournaments—3 for a win, 2 for a draw, 1 for a loss. The top two teams in each pool advanced to the Cup competition. The four quarterfinal losers dropped into the bracket for the Plate. The Bowl was contested by the third- and fourth-place finishers in each pool, with the losers in the Bowl quarterfinals dropping into the bracket for the Shield.

== Teams ==
The participating teams were:

- Argentina
- Australia
- Canada
- England
- Fiji
- France
- Kenya
- New Zealand
- Portugal
- Samoa
- Scotland
- South Africa
- Spain
- Tonga
- United States
- Wales

== Pool stage ==
The draw was made on December 9, 2012.

Key to colours in group tables
Teams that advance to the Cup Quarterfinal

=== Pool A ===
Teams	Pld	W	D	L	PF	PA	+/−	Pts
England	3	2	1	0	59	31	+28	8
New Zealand	3	2	0	1	67	34	+33	7
Spain	3	1	0	2	20	69	−49	5
United States	3	0	1	2	27	39	−12	4

1 February 2013
15:12

New Zealand	14 – 19	England
	Report

Westpac Stadium, Wellington

1 February 2013
15:34

United States	5 – 10	Spain
	Report

Westpac Stadium, Wellington

1 February 2013
18:08

New Zealand	36 – 5	Spain
	Report

Westpac Stadium, Wellington

1 February 2013
18:30

United States	12 – 12	England
	Report

Westpac Stadium, Wellington

1 February 2013
20:50

England	28 – 5	Spain
	Report

Westpac Stadium, Wellington

1 February 2013
21:56

New Zealand	17 – 10	United States
	Report

Westpac Stadium, Wellington

=== Pool B ===
Teams	Pld	W	D	L	PF	PA	+/−	Pts
Kenya	3	3	0	0	53	22	+31	9
Argentina	3	2	0	1	38	38	0	7
France	3	1	0	2	59	48	+11	5
Tonga	3	0	0	3	29	71	−42	3

1 February 2013
13:00

France	12 – 24	Kenya
	Report

Westpac Stadium, Wellington

1 February 2013
13:22

Argentina	21 – 12	Tonga
	Report

Westpac Stadium, Wellington

1 February 2013
15:56

France	33 – 7	Tonga
	Report

Westpac Stadium, Wellington

1 February 2013
16:18

Argentina	0 – 12	Kenya
	Report

Westpac Stadium, Wellington

1 February 2013
18:52

Kenya	17 – 10	Tonga
	Report

Westpac Stadium, Wellington

1 February 2013
19:36

France	14 – 17	Argentina
	Report

Westpac Stadium, Wellington

=== Pool C ===
Teams	Pld	W	D	L	PF	PA	+/−	Pts
Samoa	3	3	0	0	64	34	+30	9
South Africa	3	1	0	2	46	45	+1	5
Canada	3	1	0	2	55	67	−12	5
Wales	3	1	0	2	38	57	−19	5

1 February 2013
13:44

South Africa	10 – 19	Samoa
	Report

Westpac Stadium, Wellington

1 February 2013
14:06

Wales	26 – 17	Canada
	Report

Westpac Stadium, Wellington

1 February 2013
16:40

South Africa	15 – 26	Canada
	Report

Westpac Stadium, Wellington

1 February 2013
17:02

Wales	12 – 19	Samoa
	Report

Westpac Stadium, Wellington

1 February 2013
19:14

Samoa	26 – 12	Canada
	Report

Westpac Stadium, Wellington

1 February 2013
21:12

South Africa	21 – 0	Wales
	Report

Westpac Stadium, Wellington

=== Pool D ===
Teams	Pld	W	D	L	PF	PA	+/−	Pts
Australia	3	3	0	0	74	22	+52	9
Scotland	3	2	0	1	38	58	−20	7
Fiji	3	1	0	2	48	42	+6	5
Portugal	3	0	0	3	29	67	−38	3

1 February 2013
14:28

Portugal	5 – 24	Australia
	Report

Westpac Stadium, Wellington

1 February 2013
14:50

Fiji	12 – 14	Scotland
	Report

Westpac Stadium, Wellington

1 February 2013
17:24

Portugal	17 – 19	Scotland
	Report

Westpac Stadium, Wellington

1 February 2013
17:46

Fiji	12 – 21	Australia
	Report

Westpac Stadium, Wellington

1 February 2013
20:28

Australia	29 – 5	Scotland
	Report

Westpac Stadium, Wellington

1 February 2013
21:34

Portugal	7 – 24	Fiji
	Report

Westpac Stadium, Wellington

== Knockout stage ==
=== Shield ===
Quarter-finals
2 February – Wellington
Spain	26
Portugal	19
2 February – Wellington
Canada	28
Tonga	5
2 February – Wellington
Fiji	29
United States	12
2 February – Wellington
France	33
Wales	12

Semi-finals
2 February – Wellington
Portugal	7
Tonga	17
2 February – Wellington
United States	15
Wales	17

Final
2 February – Wellington
Tonga	21
Wales	26

=== Bowl ===
Quarter-finals
2 February – Wellington
Spain	26
Portugal	19
2 February – Wellington
Canada	28
Tonga	5
2 February – Wellington
Fiji	29
United States	12
2 February – Wellington
France	33
Wales	12

Semi-finals
2 February – Wellington
Spain	7
Canada	31
2 February – Wellington
Fiji	19
France	17

Final
2 February – Wellington
Canada	28
Fiji	19

=== Plate ===
Quarter-finals
2 February – Wellington
England	31
Scotland	7
2 February – Wellington
Samoa	31
Argentina	7
2 February – Wellington
Australia	5
New Zealand	24
2 February – Wellington
Kenya	21
South Africa	20

Semi-finals
2 February – Wellington
Scotland	35
Argentina	5
2 February – Wellington
Australia	28
South Africa	12

Final
2 February – Wellington
Scotland	7
Australia	22

=== Cup ===
Quarter-finals
2 February – Wellington
England	31
Scotland	7
2 February – Wellington
Samoa	31
Argentina	7
2 February – Wellington
Australia	5
New Zealand	24
2 February – Wellington
Kenya	21
South Africa	20

Semi-finals
2 February – Wellington
England	21
Samoa	19
2 February – Wellington
New Zealand	14
Kenya	19

Final
2 February – Wellington
England	24
Kenya	19
Third place
2 February – Wellington
Samoa	7
New Zealand	17
