= 2012 Gold Coast Sevens =

Rugby tournament

- IRB Sevens XIV
- Host nation: Australia
- Date: 13–14 October 2012

Cup
- Champion: Fiji
- Runner-up: New Zealand
- Third: South Africa

Plate
- Winner: Argentina
- Runner-up: France

Bowl
- Winner: Spain
- Runner-up: England

Shield
- Winner: Scotland
- Runner-up: United States

Tournament details
- Matches played: 45
- Tries scored: 245 (average 5.44 per match)
- Most points: (Fiji) Joji Baleviani Raqamate (59 points)
- Most tries: (Scotland) James Fleming (South Africa) Cornal Hendricks (8 tries)

The 2012 Gold Coast Sevens was the first tournament of the 2012-2013 Sevens World Series. It was held over the weekend of 13–14 October 2012 at Robina Stadium (known for sponsorship reasons as Skilled Park) in Queensland, Australia, and was the tenth edition of the Australian Sevens tournament.

Fiji defeated New Zealand 32–14 in the final to successfully defend their title.

== Format ==
The teams were drawn into four pools of four teams each. Each team played everyone in their pool one time. The top two teams from each pool advanced to the Cup/Plate brackets. The bottom two teams from each group went to the Bowl/Shield brackets.

== Teams ==
The participating teams and schedule were announced on 17 September 2012.

- Argentina
- Australia
- Canada
- England
- Fiji
- France
- Kenya
- New Zealand
- Portugal
- Samoa
- Scotland
- South Africa
- Spain
- Tonga
- United States
- Wales

== Pool Stage ==
Key to colours in group tables
Teams that advanced to the Cup Quarterfinal

=== Pool A ===
Team	Pld	W	D	L	PF	PA	PD	Pts
South Africa	3	3	0	0	102	26	+76	9
New Zealand	3	2	0	1	68	59	+9	7
Canada	3	1	0	2	43	87	−44	5
United States	3	0	0	3	33	74	−41	3

13 October 2012
11:58

New Zealand	19 – 7	United States

Skilled Park, Gold Coast

13 October 2012
12:20

South Africa	38 – 0	Canada

Skilled Park, Gold Coast

13 October 2012
15:14

New Zealand	28 – 21	Canada

Skilled Park, Gold Coast

13 October 2012
15:36

South Africa	33 – 5	United States

Skilled Park, Gold Coast

13 October 2012
17:46

United States	21 – 22	Canada

Skilled Park, Gold Coast

13 October 2012
19:24

New Zealand	21 – 31	South Africa

Skilled Park, Gold Coast

=== Pool B ===
Team	Pld	W	D	L	PF	PA	PD	Pts
Australia	3	3	0	0	68	28	+12	9
Fiji	3	2	0	1	80	36	+44	7
Tonga	3	1	0	2	45	71	−26	5
Scotland	3	0	0	3	19	77	−58	3

13 October 2012
12:42

Fiji	31 – 14	Scotland

Skilled Park, Gold Coast

13 October 2012
13:04

Australia	31 – 14	Tonga

Skilled Park, Gold Coast

13 October 2012
15:58

Fiji	35 – 7	Tonga

Skilled Park, Gold Coast

13 October 2012
16:20

Australia	22 – 0	Scotland

Skilled Park, Gold Coast

13 October 2012
18:08

Scotland	5 – 24	Tonga

Skilled Park, Gold Coast

13 October 2012
19:46

Fiji	14 – 15	Australia

Skilled Park, Gold Coast

=== Pool C ===
Team	Pld	W	D	L	PF	PA	PD	Pts
Samoa	3	3	0	0	64	39	+25	9
Kenya	3	1	1	1	52	40	+12	6
England	3	1	1	1	44	43	+1	6
Spain	3	0	0	3	32	70	−38	3

13 October 2012
10:30

England	14 – 14	Kenya
	Report

Skilled Park, Gold Coast

13 October 2012
10:52

Samoa	31 – 10	Spain

Skilled Park, Gold Coast

13 October 2012
13:36

England	13 – 10	Spain
	Report

Skilled Park, Gold Coast

13 October 2012
13:58

Samoa	14 – 12	Kenya

Skilled Park, Gold Coast

13 October 2012
17:02

Kenya	26 – 12	Spain
	Report

Skilled Park, Gold Coast

13 October 2012
18:40

England	17 – 19	Samoa
	Report

Skilled Park, Gold Coast

=== Pool D ===
Team	Pld	W	D	L	PF	PA	PD	Pts
Argentina	3	2	0	1	50	19	+31	7
France	3	2	0	1	43	31	+12	7
Wales	3	2	0	1	43	46	−3	7
Portugal	3	0	0	3	17	57	−40	3

13 October 2012
11:14

Argentina	7 – 14	France

Skilled Park, Gold Coast

13 October 2012
11:36

Wales	19 – 12	Portugal

Skilled Park, Gold Coast

13 October 2012
14:20

Argentina	26 – 0	Portugal

Skilled Park, Gold Coast

13 October 2012
14:42

Wales	19 – 17	France

Skilled Park, Gold Coast

13 October 2012
17:24

France	12 – 5	Portugal

Skilled Park, Gold Coast

13 October 2012
19:02

Argentina	17 – 5	Wales

Skilled Park, Gold Coast

== Knockout stage ==
=== Shield ===
Quarter-finals
14 October – Skilled Park, Gold Coast
Canada	31
Portugal	0
14 October – Skilled Park, Gold Coast
England	35
Scotland	7
14 October – Skilled Park, Gold Coast
Wales	27
United States	19
14 October – Skilled Park, Gold Coast
Tonga	7
Spain	24

Semi-finals
14 October – Skilled Park, Gold Coast
Portugal	0
Scotland	33
14 October – Skilled Park, Gold Coast
United States	33
Tonga	26

Final
14 October – Skilled Park, Gold Coast
Scotland	40
United States	5

=== Bowl ===
Quarter-finals
14 October – Skilled Park, Gold Coast
Canada	31
Portugal	0
14 October – Skilled Park, Gold Coast
England	35
Scotland	7
14 October – Skilled Park, Gold Coast
Wales	27
United States	19
14 October – Skilled Park, Gold Coast
Tonga	7
Spain	24

Semi-finals
14 October – Skilled Park, Gold Coast
Canada	19
England	24
14 October – Skilled Park, Gold Coast
Wales	17
Spain	26

Final
14 October – Skilled Park, Gold Coast
England	14
Spain	19

=== Plate ===
Quarter-finals
14 October – Skilled Park, Gold Coast
South Africa	26
France	14
14 October – Skilled Park, Gold Coast
Samoa	7
Fiji	19
14 October – Skilled Park, Gold Coast
Argentina	7
New Zealand	12
14 October – Skilled Park, Gold Coast
Australia	14
Kenya	21

Semi-finals
14 October – Skilled Park, Gold Coast
France	21
Samoa	7
14 October – Skilled Park, Gold Coast
Argentina	17
Australia	14

Final
14 October – Skilled Park, Gold Coast
France	7
Argentina	14

=== Cup ===
Quarter-finals
14 October – Skilled Park, Gold Coast
South Africa	26
France	14
14 October – Skilled Park, Gold Coast
Samoa	7
Fiji	19
14 October – Skilled Park, Gold Coast
Argentina	7
New Zealand	12
14 October – Skilled Park, Gold Coast
Australia	14
Kenya	21

Semi-finals
14 October – Skilled Park, Gold Coast
South Africa	10
Fiji	21
14 October – Skilled Park, Gold Coast
New Zealand	15
Kenya	5

Final
14 October – Skilled Park, Gold Coast
Fiji	32
New Zealand	14
Third place
14 October – Skilled Park, Gold Coast
South Africa	41
Kenya	7
