= Frankie Horne =

South African rugby union player (born 1983)

- Full name: Francis Henry Horne
- Born: 24 February 1983 (age 43) Port Elizabeth, South Africa
- Height: 1.83 m (6 ft 0 in)
- Weight: 105 kg (231 lb; 16 st 7 lb)
- School: Hugenote Hoërskool, Wellington

Rugby union career
- Position: Flanker
Youth career
- 2002–2003: Boland Cavaliers
Amateur team(s)
Years	Team	Apps	(Points)
2002–2007	Wellington		
Senior career
Years	Team	Apps	(Points)
2005–2008	Boland Cavaliers	22	(0)
- Correct as of 9 December 2014
International career
Years	Team	Apps	(Points)
2007–2016	South Africa Sevens	60	(275)
- Correct as of 9 December 2014
Medal record
Men's rugby sevens
Representing South Africa
Commonwealth Games
Gold medal – first place	2014 Glasgow	Team competition
World Games
Bronze medal – third place	2009 Kaohsiung	Team competition

Francis Henry Horne (born 24 February 1983) is a South African rugby union player who played for the South African Sevens team from 2007 until 2016. He also played 15-man rugby for Wellington in club rugby and for the Boland Cavaliers at provincial level. He mainly played as a flanker, but also played as a hooker or a centre on occasion.

== Career ==
=== Youth and amateur rugby ===
Horne was born in Port Elizabeth, South Africa. Having grown up in Wellington in the Western Cape, Horne first played rugby at a provincial level when he appeared for the Boland U19 side in the 2002 Under-19 Provincial Championship. In 2003, he also represented the side at Under-20 level.

He also represented Boland-based club side Wellington between 2002 and 2006.

=== Boland Cavaliers ===
He made his first class debut for the Boland Cavaliers during the 2005 Vodacom Cup competition, starting their opening match of the season against the Pumas and helping them to a 34–20 victory. He made two more substitute appearances in their matches against Griquas and the Leopards as his side finished second in Section X of the competition to reach the semi-final of the competition. He also represented Boland's amateur side in the Provincial Amateur Competition in 2005.

In the 2006 Vodacom Cup, Horne made a solitary appearance for the Cavaliers in their match against the Free State XV, but he didn't go unnoticed by the South African Sevens selectors and earned a call-up to a Sevens training group at the end of 2006.

He once again had limited involvement in the 2007 Vodacom Cup, playing off the bench on two occasions as the replacement hooker. However, he was included in the Boland Cavaliers Currie Cup side for the 2007 Currie Cup Premier Division. He made his Currie Cup debut on 22 June 2007 against the Free State Cheetahs in Bloemfontein, being on the wrong end of a 91–3 scoreline. After three more matches that saw Horne play-off the bench, he made his first start in their 50–25 defeat to the Sharks and eventually made a total of eight appearances.

Despite mainly being involved with the South African Sevens side (see below), he did return to provincial action for the Boland Cavaliers during the 2008 Currie Cup Premier Division, starting on five occasions and playing off the bench in one match.

=== South African Sevens ===
When the South African Rugby Union introduced central contracts for sevens players in 2007, Horne was one of the players that they contracted for the 2007–08 IRB Sevens World Series. He made his sevens debut at the 2007 Dubai Sevens tournament and immediately established himself as a key player for the team, appearing in all eight tournaments in the series.

He once again played every leg of the 2008–09 IRB Sevens World Series, as South Africa won the series for the first time at their tenth attempt. He also played in the 2009 Rugby World Cup Sevens competition, helping South Africa to the quarter-finals, where they lost to Argentina. He also won a bronze medal with the side at the 2009 World Games in Kaohsiung, Republic of China (Taiwan).

He remained an ever-present for the side over the next few seasons. During the 2013 London Sevens, Horne played in his 50th consecutive IRB Sevens World Series tournament, becoming the first player to achieve this feat.

He was also selected in the squad that played at the 2014 Commonwealth Games and helped his side to a 17–12 victory over a New Zealand that won the previous four tournaments.

Horne was not selected in the South Africa squad for the 2016 Olympics, and he retired from the South Africa sevens team at the end of 2016.
