= 2013 London Sevens =

- Host nation: England
- Date: 11–12 May 2013

Cup
- Champion: New Zealand
- Runner-up: Australia
- Third: England

Plate
- Winner: Fiji
- Runner-up: United States

Bowl
- Winner: Wales
- Runner-up: France

Shield
- Winner: No Shield
- Runner-up: No Shield

Tournament details
- Matches played: 32
- Tries scored: 179 (average 5.59 per match)
- Most points: (England) Dan Norton (50 points)
- Most tries: (England) Dan Norton (10 tries)

The 2013 London Sevens was the seventh edition of the rugby union tournament and the final stage of the 2012–13 IRB Sevens World Series and was hosted at Twickenham Stadium in London, England.

== Format ==
The teams were divided into pools of four teams, who played a round-robin within the pool. Points were awarded in each pool on the standard schedule for rugby sevens tournaments (though different from the standard in the 15-man game)—3 for a win, 2 for a draw, 1 for a loss.

From the end of the 2012/13 Series, promotion and relegation from core team status came into effect, with a pre-qualifying competition in Hong Kong and a final core team qualifier in London at the ninth and final round of the season.

The 2013 London Sevens, the final round of the Series, featured two distinct tournaments, and a total of 20 teams. In the first, the top 12-ranked sides in the HSBC Sevens World Series standings after round eight in Glasgow competed for the London title, and final World Series points towards their overall tally.

In the second, the 13th, 14th and 15th-ranked core teams after the Glasgow event competed against five pre-qualified regional teams from Hong Kong, for the three available core team places on the 2013–14 IRB Sevens World Series.

== Teams ==
=== Main draw ===
- Argentina
- Australia
- Canada
- England
- Fiji
- France
- Kenya
- New Zealand
- Samoa
- South Africa
- United States
- Wales

=== World Series qualifiers ===
- Georgia
- Hong Kong
- Portugal
- Russia
- Scotland
- Spain
- Tonga
- Zimbabwe

== Main draw ==
The draw was made on 5 May 2013.

=== Pool Stage ===
Key to colours in group tables
Teams that advance to the Cup Quarterfinal

==== Pool A ====
Teams	Pld	W	D	L	PF	PA	+/−	Pts
Australia	3	2	0	1	54	32	+22	7
United States	3	2	0	1	53	48	+5	7
South Africa	3	2	0	1	34	33	+1	7
France	3	0	0	3	43	71	−28	3

11 May 2013
09:30

United States	19 – 17	France
	Report

Twickenham Stadium, London

11 May 2013
09:52

South Africa	5 – 0	Australia
	Report

Twickenham Stadium, London

11 May 2013
13:40

South Africa	17 – 14	France

Twickenham Stadium, London

11 May 2013
14:02

United States	15 – 19	Australia

Twickenham Stadium, London

11 May 2013
16:02

South Africa	12 – 19	United States
	Report

Twickenham Stadium, London

11 May 2013
16:24

Australia	35 – 12	France

Twickenham Stadium, London

==== Pool B ====
Teams	Pld	W	D	L	PF	PA	+/−	Pts
New Zealand	3	3	0	0	100	29	+71	9
Kenya	3	2	0	1	86	62	+24	7
Wales	3	1	0	2	41	90	−49	5
Canada	3	0	0	3	33	79	−46	3

11 May 2013
10:14

Wales	19 – 31	Kenya
	Report

Twickenham Stadium, London

11 May 2013
10:36

New Zealand	24 – 7	Canada
	Report

Twickenham Stadium, London

11 May 2013
14:24

New Zealand	31 – 17	Kenya
	Report

Twickenham Stadium, London

11 May 2013
14:46

Wales	17 – 14	Canada
	Report

Twickenham Stadium, London

11 May 2013
17:03

Canada	12 – 38	Kenya
	Report

Twickenham Stadium, London

11 May 2013
17:25

New Zealand	45 – 5	Wales

Twickenham Stadium, London

==== Pool C ====
Teams	Pld	W	D	L	PF	PA	+/−	Pts
England	3	2	0	1	78	33	+45	7
Fiji	3	2	0	1	57	34	+23	7
Argentina	3	2	0	1	36	48	−12	7
Samoa	3	0	0	3	21	77	−56	3

11 May 2013
10:58

Argentina	10 – 7	Samoa

Twickenham Stadium, London

11 May 2013
11:20

England	27 – 0	Fiji
	Report

Twickenham Stadium, London

11 May 2013
15:18

England	34 – 7	Samoa

Twickenham Stadium, London

11 May 2013
15:40

Argentina	0 – 24	Fiji
	Report

Twickenham Stadium, London

11 May 2013
17:47

Fiji	33 – 7	Samoa
	Report

Twickenham Stadium, London

11 May 2013
18:09

England	17 – 26	Argentina
	Report

Twickenham Stadium, London

=== Knockout stage ===
==== Bowl ====
Semi-finals
12 May – 12:55 – Twickenham Stadium
Wales	21
Samoa	12
12 May – 13:17 – Twickenham Stadium
France	28
Canada	14

Final
12 May – 16:34 – Twickenham Stadium
Wales	19
France	7

==== Plate ====
Semi-finals
12 May – 14:23 – Twickenham Stadium
Argentina	12
Fiji	26
12 May – 14:45 – Twickenham Stadium
United States	22
South Africa	5

Final
12 May – 16:59 – Twickenham Stadium
Fiji	14
United States	5

==== Cup ====
Quarter-finals
12 May – 10:28 – Twickenham Stadium
New Zealand	52
Argentina	7
12 May – 10:50 – Twickenham Stadium
Kenya	20
Fiji	7
12 May – 11:12 – Twickenham Stadium
Australia	24
United States	19
12 May – 11:34 – Twickenham Stadium
England	19
South Africa	14

Semi-finals
12 May – 15:22 – Twickenham Stadium
New Zealand	7
Kenya	0
12 May – 15:44 – Twickenham Stadium
Australia	14
England	7

Final
12 May – 18:14 – Twickenham Stadium
New Zealand	47
Australia	12
Third place
12 May – 17:49 – Twickenham Stadium
Kenya	19
England	26

== World Series qualifiers ==
The draw was made on 5 May 2013.

=== Pool Stage ===
==== Pool A ====
Teams	Pld	W	D	L	PF	PA	+/−	Pts
Scotland	3	2	0	1	69	34	+35	7
Zimbabwe	3	2	0	1	45	42	+3	7
Hong Kong	3	2	0	1	44	43	+1	7
Georgia	3	0	0	3	26	65	−39	3

11 May 2013
09:00

Zimbabwe	12 – 7	Hong Kong

Twickenham Stadium, London

11 May 2013
09:22

Scotland	29 – 0	Georgia

Twickenham Stadium, London

11 May 2013
12:12

Hong Kong	17 – 12	Georgia

Twickenham Stadium, London

11 May 2013
12:34

Scotland	21 – 14	Zimbabwe

Twickenham Stadium, London

11 May 2013
14:58

Zimbabwe	19 – 14	Georgia

Twickenham Stadium, London

11 May 2013
16:00

Scotland	19 – 20	Hong Kong

Twickenham Stadium, London

==== Pool B ====
Teams	Pld	W	D	L	PF	PA	+/−	Pts
Portugal	3	3	0	0	45	22	+23	9
Spain	3	1	0	2	41	40	+1	5
Russia	3	1	0	2	43	52	−9	5
Tonga	3	1	0	2	33	48	−15	5

11 May 2013
09:44

Tonga	19 – 17	Spain

Twickenham Stadium, London

11 May 2013
10:06

Portugal	26 – 10	Russia

Twickenham Stadium, London

11 May 2013
12:56

Spain	19 – 14	Russia

Twickenham Stadium, London

11 May 2013
13:18

Portugal	12 – 7	Tonga

Twickenham Stadium, London

11 May 2013
15:20

Tonga	7 – 19	Russia

Twickenham Stadium, London

11 May 2013
16:22

Portugal	7 – 5	Spain

Twickenham Stadium, London

=== Knockout stage ===
The winners of the Semifinals, Spain and Scotland, earned core status for the 2013–14 IRB Sevens World Series. The losing teams, Portugal and Russia, advanced to the Qualifier Third Place playoff. Portugal won the Qualifier Third Place playoff and therefore became the final team to earn core status next season.

Quarterfinals
12 May – 09:00 – Twickenham Stadium
Portugal	17
Georgia	5
12 May – 09:22 – Twickenham Stadium
Spain	29
Hong Kong	14
12 May – 09:44 – Twickenham Stadium
Zimbabwe	7
Russia	26
12 May – 10:06 – Twickenham Stadium
Scotland	31
Tonga	0

Semifinals
12 May – 13:39 – Twickenham Stadium
Portugal	5
Spain	10
12 May – 14:01 – Twickenham Stadium
Russia	0
Scotland	19

Third place playoff Qualifier
12 May – 17:24 – Twickenham Stadium
Portugal	10
Russia	5
