= 2011 Gold Coast Sevens =

- IRB Sevens XIII
- Host nation: Australia
- Date: 25–26 November 2011

Cup
- Champion: Fiji
- Runner-up: New Zealand
- Third: South Africa

Plate
- Winner: Wales
- Runner-up: Samoa

Bowl
- Winner: Argentina
- Runner-up: Scotland

Shield
- Winner: Papua New Guinea
- Runner-up: Japan

Tournament details
- Matches played: 45
- Tries scored: 230 (average 5.11 per match)
- Most points: (New Zealand) Junior Tomasi Cama (48 points)
- Most tries: (South Africa) Chris Dry (Argentina) Manuel Montero (7 tries)

The 2011 Gold Coast Sevens was the first tournament of the 2011-2012 Sevens World Series It was held over the weekend of 25–26 November 2011 at Robina Stadium (known for sponsorship reasons as Skilled Park) in Queensland, Australia. The tournament was the ninth completed edition of the Australian Sevens and the first on the Gold Coast after the event had been previously hosted in Adelaide and Brisbane.

Fiji won the tournament by defeating New Zealand in the Cup final 26–12.

== Format ==
The teams are divided into pools of four teams, and a round-robin played within each pool. Points in rugby sevens pools are awarded on a different basis to most rugby tournaments: 3 for a win, 2 for a draw, 1 for a loss.

The top two teams in each pool advance to the Cup competition, and the four Cup quarterfinal losers drop into the bracket to play for the Plate. The bottom two teams in each pool go to the Bowl competition, and the four Bowl quarterfinal losers drop into the bracket to play for the Shield.

== Teams ==
The participating teams were announced on 8 September.

- Argentina
- Australia
- England
- Fiji
- France
- Japan
- Kenya
- New Zealand
- Niue
- Papua New Guinea
- Samoa
- Scotland
- South Africa
- Tonga
- United States
- Wales

== Pool stage ==
The draw was made on 7 November.

Key to colours in group tables
Teams that advanced to the Cup Quarterfinal

All times are local (UTC+10).

=== Pool A ===
Teams	Pld	W	D	L	PF	PA	+/−	Pts
New Zealand	3	3	0	0	92	10	+82	9
Fiji	3	2	0	1	69	35	+34	7
Kenya	3	1	0	2	31	59	−28	5
Niue	3	0	0	3	7	95	−88	3

25 November 2011
14:03

New Zealand	26–5	Kenya

Robina Stadium, Robina

25 November 2011
14:25

Fiji	38–0	Niue

Robina Stadium, Robina

25 November 2011
17:09

New Zealand	38–0	Niue
	Report

Robina Stadium, Robina

25 November 2011
17:31

Fiji	26–7	Kenya

Robina Stadium, Robina

25 November 2011
19:36

Kenya	19–7	Niue
	Report

Robina Stadium, Robina

25 November 2011
21:14

New Zealand	28–5	Fiji
	Report

Robina Stadium, Robina

=== Pool B ===
Teams	Pld	W	D	L	PF	PA	+/−	Pts
South Africa	3	3	0	0	69	26	+43	9
Australia	3	2	0	1	62	28	+34	7
United States	3	1	0	2	40	39	+1	5
Japan	3	0	0	3	7	85	−78	3

25 November 2011
14:47

South Africa	17–12	United States

Robina Stadium, Robina

25 November 2011
15:09

Australia	33–0	Japan

Robina Stadium, Robina

25 November 2011
17:53

South Africa	31–7	Japan

Robina Stadium, Robina

25 November 2011
18:15

Australia	22–7	United States

Robina Stadium, Robina

25 November 2011
19:58

United States	21–0	Japan

Robina Stadium, Robina

25 November 2011
21:36

South Africa	21–7	Australia
	Report

Robina Stadium, Robina

=== Pool C ===
Teams	Pld	W	D	L	PF	PA	+/−	Pts
Samoa	3	3	0	0	91	14	+77	9
France	3	2	0	1	78	43	+35	7
Argentina	3	1	0	2	47	60	−13	5
Papua New Guinea	3	0	0	3	5	104	−99	3

25 November 2011
12:35

Samoa	24–14	France
	Report

Robina Stadium, Robina

25 November 2011
12:57

Argentina	33–0	Papua New Guinea

Robina Stadium, Robina

25 November 2011
15:41

Samoa	38–0	Papua New Guinea

Robina Stadium, Robina

25 November 2011
16:03

Argentina	14–31	France

Robina Stadium, Robina

25 November 2011
18:52

France	33–5	Papua New Guinea

Robina Stadium, Robina

25 November 2011
20:30

Samoa	29–0	Argentina

Robina Stadium, Robina

=== Pool D ===
Teams	Pld	W	D	L	PF	PA	+/−	Pts
Wales	3	3	0	0	59	26	+33	9
England	3	2	0	1	50	26	+24	7
Scotland	3	1	0	2	31	50	−19	5
Tonga	3	0	0	3	19	57	−38	3

25 November 2011
13:19

England	24–5	Scotland
	Report

Robina Stadium, Robina

25 November 2011
13:41

Wales	24–7	Tonga

Robina Stadium, Robina

25 November 2011
16:25

England	19–0	Tonga

Robina Stadium, Robina

25 November 2011
16:47

Wales	14–12	Scotland

Robina Stadium, Robina

25 November 2011
19:14

Scotland	14–12	Tonga
	Report

Robina Stadium, Robina

25 November 2011
20:52

England	7–21	Wales

Robina Stadium, Robina

== Knockout stage ==
=== Shield ===
Quarter-finals
26 November – Robina
Kenya	5
Tonga	7
26 November – Robina
Argentina	28
Japan	12
26 November – Robina
Scotland	36
Niue	0
26 November – Robina
United States	24
Papua New Guinea	5

Semi-finals
26 November – Robina
Kenya	14
Japan	19
26 November – Robina
Niue	0
Papua New Guinea	38

Final
26 November – Robina
Japan	19
Papua New Guinea	31

=== Bowl ===
Quarter-finals
26 November – Robina
Kenya	5
Tonga	7
26 November – Robina
Argentina	38
Japan	12
26 November – Robina
Scotland	36
Niue	0
26 November – Robina
United States	24
Papua New Guinea	5

Semi-finals
26 November – Robina
Tonga	15
Argentina	24
26 November – Robina
Scotland	19
United States	5

Final
26 November – Robina
Argentina	17
Scotland	14

=== Plate ===
Quarter-finals
26 November – Robina
New Zealand	24
England	14
26 November – Robina
Samoa	12
Australia	14
26 November – Robina
Wales	5
Fiji	33
26 November – Robina
South Africa	14
France	5

Semi-finals
26 November – Robina
England	14
Samoa	17
26 November – Robina
Wales	14
France	12

Final
26 November – Robina
Samoa	15
Wales	26

=== Cup ===
Quarter-finals
26 November – Robina
New Zealand	24
England	14
26 November – Robina
Samoa	12
Australia	14
26 November – Robina
Wales	5
Fiji	33
26 November – Robina
South Africa	14
France	5

Semi-finals
26 November – Robina
New Zealand	26
Australia	7
26 November – Robina
Fiji	24
South Africa	7

Final
26 November – Robina
New Zealand	12
Fiji	26
Third place
26 November – Robina
Australia	5
South Africa	17
