= 2012 London Sevens =

- Host nation: England
- Date: 12–13 May 2012

Cup
- Champion: Fiji
- Runner-up: Samoa
- Third: New Zealand

Plate
- Winner: Australia
- Runner-up: England

Bowl
- Winner: Wales
- Runner-up: Scotland

Shield
- Winner: France
- Runner-up: United States

Tournament details
- Matches played: 45
- Tries scored: 258 (average 5.73 per match)
- Most points: (New Zealand) Tomasi Cama (60 points)
- Most tries: (Samoa) Tom Iosefo (8 tries)

The 2012 London Sevens was the sixth edition of the tournament and the ninth tournament of the 2011–12 IRB Sevens World Series. The host stadium was the Twickenham Stadium.

Fiji won the title by defeating Samoa 38–15 in the final.

== Format ==
The teams were divided into pools of four teams, who played a round-robin within the pool. Points were awarded in each pool on a different schedule from most rugby tournaments—3 for a win, 2 for a draw, 1 for a loss. The top two teams in each pool advanced to the Cup competition. The four quarterfinal losers dropped into the bracket for the Plate. The Bowl was contested by the third- and fourth-place finishers in each pool, with the losers in the Bowl quarterfinals dropping into the bracket for the Shield.

== Teams ==
The following teams participated.

- Argentina
- Australia
- England
- Fiji
- France
- Kenya
- New Zealand
- Portugal
- Russia
- Samoa
- Scotland
- South Africa
- Spain
- United States
- Wales
- Zimbabwe

== Pool stage ==
The draw was made on 6 May.

Key to colours in group tables
Teams that advance to the Cup Quarterfinal

=== Pool A ===
Teams	Pld	W	D	L	PF	PA	+/−	Pts
New Zealand	3	3	0	0	88	17	+71	9
Argentina	3	2	0	1	48	41	+7	7
Russia	3	1	0	2	42	92	−50	5
Kenya	3	0	0	3	31	59	−28	3

12 May 2012
11:58

New Zealand	49 – 7	Russia
	Report^{[usurped]}

Twickenham Stadium, London

12 May 2012
12:20

Argentina	14 – 12	Kenya
	Report^{[usurped]}

Twickenham Stadium, London

12 May 2012
15:04

New Zealand	24 – 0	Kenya
	Report^{[usurped]}

Twickenham Stadium, London

12 May 2012
15:26

Argentina	24 – 14	Russia

Twickenham Stadium, London

12 May 2012
17:28

Russia	21 – 19	Kenya

Twickenham Stadium, London

12 May 2012
19:06

New Zealand	15 – 10	Argentina
	Report^{[usurped]}

Twickenham Stadium, London

=== Pool B ===
Teams	Pld	W	D	L	PF	PA	+/−	Pts
Samoa	3	3	0	0	71	43	+28	9
England	3	2	0	1	50	19	+31	7
France	3	1	0	2	38	69	−31	5
United States	3	0	0	3	37	65	−28	3

12 May 2012
12:42

England	28 – 0	France
	Report^{[usurped]}

Twickenham Stadium, London

12 May 2012
13:04

Samoa	31 – 17	United States

Twickenham Stadium, London

12 May 2012
16:00

England	15 – 5	United States
	Report^{[usurped]}

Twickenham Stadium, London

12 May 2012
16:22

Samoa	26 – 19	France

Twickenham Stadium, London

12 May 2012
17:50

France	19 – 15	United States

Twickenham Stadium, London

12 May 2012
19:28

England	7 – 14	Samoa
	Report^{[usurped]}

Twickenham Stadium, London

=== Pool C ===
Teams	Pld	W	D	L	PF	PA	+/−	Pts
Fiji	3	3	0	0	91	12	+79	9
Spain	3	2	0	1	65	26	+39	7
Wales	3	1	0	2	33	77	−44	5
Zimbabwe	3	0	0	3	12	86	−74	3

12 May 2012
10:30

Fiji	19 – 5	Spain
	Report^{[usurped]}

Twickenham Stadium, London

12 May 2012
10:52

Wales	19 – 12	Zimbabwe

Twickenham Stadium, London

12 May 2012
13:36

Fiji	29 – 0	Zimbabwe

Twickenham Stadium, London

12 May 2012
13:58

Wales	7 – 22	Spain
	Report^{[usurped]}

Twickenham Stadium, London

12 May 2012
16:44

Spain	38 – 0	Zimbabwe

Twickenham Stadium, London

12 May 2012
18:22

Fiji	43 – 7	Wales

Twickenham Stadium, London

=== Pool D ===
Teams	Pld	W	D	L	PF	PA	+/−	Pts
Australia	3	3	0	0	72	34	+38	9
South Africa	3	2	0	1	78	24	+54	7
Scotland	3	1	0	2	43	59	−16	5
Portugal	3	0	0	3	17	93	−76	3

12 May 2012
11:14

Australia	27 – 12	Scotland

Twickenham Stadium, London

12 May 2012
11:36

South Africa	41 – 0	Portugal
	Report^{[usurped]}

Twickenham Stadium, London

12 May 2012
14:20

Australia	26 – 5	Portugal

Twickenham Stadium, London

12 May 2012
14:42

South Africa	20 – 5	Scotland

Twickenham Stadium, London

12 May 2012
17:06

Scotland	26 – 12	Portugal

Twickenham Stadium, London

12 May 2012
18:44

Australia	19 – 17	South Africa

Twickenham Stadium, London

== Knockout stage ==
=== Shield ===
Quarter-finals
13 May – London
Russia	17
Portugal	24
13 May – London
Wales	28
United States	19
13 May – London
Scotland	21
Kenya	5
13 May – London
France	17
Zimbabwe	19

Semi-finals
13 May – London
Russia	12
United States	38
13 May – London
Kenya	14
France	17

Final
13 May – London
United States	12
France	19

=== Bowl ===
Quarter-finals
13 May – London
Russia	17
Portugal	24
13 May – London
Wales	28
United States	19
13 May – London
Scotland	21
Kenya	5
13 May – London
France	17
Zimbabwe	19

Semi-finals
13 May – London
Portugal	26
Wales	28
13 May – London
Scotland	31
Zimbabwe	19

Final
13 May – London
Wales	27
Scotland	5

=== Plate ===
Quarter-finals
13 May – London
New Zealand	36
South Africa	0
13 May – London
Fiji	21
England	14
13 May – London
Australia	7
Argentina	12
13 May – London
Samoa	22
Spain	7

Semi-finals
13 May – London
South Africa	17
England	19
13 May – London
Australia	17
Spain	12

Final
13 May – London
England	12
Australia	14

=== Cup ===
Quarter-finals
13 May – London
New Zealand	36
South Africa	0
13 May – London
Fiji	21
England	14
13 May – London
Australia	7
Argentina	12
13 May – London
Samoa	22
Spain	7

Semi-finals
13 May – London
New Zealand	7
Fiji	31
13 May – London
Argentina	19
Samoa	21

Final
13 May – London
Fiji	38
Samoa	15
Third place
13 May – London
New Zealand	40
Argentina	0
