= 2013 Scotland Sevens =

Rugby sevens tournament

- Host nation: Scotland
- Date: 4–5 May 2013

Cup
- Champion: South Africa
- Runner-up: New Zealand
- Third: England

Plate
- Winner: United States
- Runner-up: Argentina

Bowl
- Winner: Australia
- Runner-up: Kenya

Shield
- Winner: France
- Runner-up: Russia

Tournament details
- Matches played: 45
- Tries scored: 262 (average 5.82 per match)
- Most points: (France) Paul Albaladejo (46 points)
- Most tries: (United States) Nick Edwards (8 tries)

The 2013 Scotland Sevens was the seventh edition of the tournament and the eighth tournament of the 2012–13 IRB Sevens World Series. The host stadium was the Scotstoun Stadium.

At the end of this event, the top 12 "core teams" (those participating in all series events) on the series table secured their core status for the 2013–14 series. The remaining three core teams will drop to the eight-team World Series Core Team Qualifier, to be held during the season's final event in London. The top three teams at the end of the Core Team Qualifier will also earn core status for 2013–14.

== Format ==
The teams were divided into pools of four teams, who played a round-robin within the pool. Points were awarded in each pool on a different schedule from most rugby tournaments—3 for a win, 2 for a draw, 1 for a loss. The top two teams in each pool advanced to the Cup competition. The four quarterfinal losers dropped into the bracket for the Plate. The Bowl was contested by the third- and fourth-place finishers in each pool, with the losers in the Bowl quarterfinals dropping into the bracket for the Shield.

== Teams ==
The participating teams were:

- Argentina
- Australia
- Canada
- England
- Fiji
- France
- Kenya
- New Zealand
- Portugal
- Russia
- Samoa
- Scotland
- South Africa
- Spain
- United States
- Wales

== Pool stage ==
The draw was made on March 31.

Key to colours in group tables
Teams that advanced to the Cup Quarterfinal

=== Pool A ===
Teams	Pld	W	D	L	PF	PA	+/−	Pts
South Africa	3	3	0	0	61	28	+33	9
Canada	3	2	0	1	54	44	+10	7
Samoa	3	1	0	2	43	46	−3	5
Kenya	3	0	0	3	24	64	−40	3

4 May 2013
11:58

South Africa	17 – 14	Kenya
	Report

Scotstoun Stadium

4 May 2013
12:20

Samoa	17 – 19	Canada
	Report

Scotstoun Stadium

4 May 2013
15:04

South Africa	17 – 14	Canada

Scotstoun Stadium

4 May 2013
15:26

Samoa	26 – 0	Kenya
	Report

Scotstoun Stadium

4 May 2013
17:31

Kenya	10 – 21	Canada

Scotstoun Stadium

4 May 2013
18:59

South Africa	27 – 0	Samoa
	Report

Scotstoun Stadium

=== Pool B ===
Teams	Pld	W	D	L	PF	PA	+/−	Pts
New Zealand	3	3	0	0	99	5	+94	9
England	3	2	0	1	80	38	+42	7
Scotland	3	1	0	2	33	62	−29	5
Portugal	3	0	0	3	5	112	−107	3

4 May 2013
12:42

New Zealand	31 – 5	England
	Report

Scotstoun Stadium

4 May 2013
13:04

Scotland	26 – 5	Portugal

Scotstoun Stadium

4 May 2013
15:48

New Zealand	40 – 0	Portugal
	Report

Scotstoun Stadium

4 May 2013
16:10

Scotland	7 – 29	England

Scotstoun Stadium

4 May 2013
17:53

England	46 – 0	Portugal

Scotstoun Stadium

4 May 2013
19:21

New Zealand	28 – 0	Scotland
	Report

Scotstoun Stadium

=== Pool C ===
Teams	Pld	W	D	L	PF	PA	+/−	Pts
Fiji	3	3	0	0	92	27	+65	9
Argentina	3	2	0	1	67	43	+24	7
Australia	3	1	0	2	69	50	+19	5
Spain	3	0	0	3	19	127	−108	3

4 May 2013
10:30

Australia	10 – 17	Argentina

Scotstoun Stadium

4 May 2013
10:52

Fiji	45 – 0	Spain
	Report

Scotstoun Stadium

4 May 2013
13:36

Australia	42 – 14	Spain

Scotstoun Stadium

4 May 2013
13:58

Fiji	28 – 10	Argentina

Scotstoun Stadium

4 May 2013
16:47

Argentina	40 – 5	Spain

Scotstoun Stadium

4 May 2013
18:15

Australia	17 – 19	Fiji
	Report

Scotstoun Stadium

=== Pool D ===
Teams	Pld	W	D	L	PF	PA	+/−	Pts
Wales	3	3	0	0	76	57	+19	9
United States	3	2	0	1	90	45	+45	7
France	3	1	0	2	43	57	−14	5
Russia	3	0	0	3	41	91	−50	3

4 May 2013
11:14

France	14 – 22	Wales
	Report

Scotstoun Stadium

4 May 2013
11:36

United States	48 – 5	Russia
	Report

Scotstoun Stadium

4 May 2013
14:20

France	15 – 14	Russia

Scotstoun Stadium

4 May 2013
14:42

United States	21 – 26	Wales

Scotstoun Stadium

4 May 2013
17:09

Wales	28 – 22	Russia

Scotstoun Stadium

4 May 2013
18:37

France	14 – 21	United States
	Report

Scotstoun Stadium

== Knockout stage ==
=== Shield ===
Quarter-finals
5 May – 10:30 – Scotstoun Stadium
Samoa	17
Russia	14
5 May – 10:52 – Scotstoun Stadium
Australia	36
Portugal	0
5 May – 11:14 – Scotstoun Stadium
France	7
Kenya	22
5 May – 11:36 – Scotstoun Stadium
Scotland	31
Spain	5

Semi-finals
5 May – 13:46 – Scotstoun Stadium
Russia	41
Portugal	7
5 May – 14:08 – Scotstoun Stadium
France	41
Spain	0

Final
5 May – 16:52 – Scotstoun Stadium
Russia	17
France	21

=== Bowl ===
Quarter-finals
5 May – 10:30 – Scotstoun Stadium
Samoa	17
Russia	14
5 May – 10:52 – Scotstoun Stadium
Australia	36
Portugal	0
5 May – 11:14 – Scotstoun Stadium
France	7
Kenya	22
5 May – 11:36 – Scotstoun Stadium
Scotland	31
Spain	5

Semi-finals
5 May – 14:30 – Scotstoun Stadium
Samoa	12
Australia	17
5 May – 14:52 – Scotstoun Stadium
Kenya	24
Scotland	19

Final
5 May – 17:20 – Scotstoun Stadium
Australia	12
Kenya	5

=== Plate ===
Quarter-finals
5 May – 11:58 – Scotstoun Stadium
South Africa	22
United States	5
5 May – 12:20 – Scotstoun Stadium
Fiji	12
England	15
5 May – 12:42 – Scotstoun Stadium
Wales	26
Canada	7
5 May – 13:04 – Scotstoun Stadium
New Zealand	42
Argentina	10

Semi-finals
5 May – 15:14 – Scotstoun Stadium
United States	22
Fiji	7
5 May – 15:36 – Scotstoun Stadium
Canada	7
Argentina	22

Final
5 May – 17:48 – Scotstoun Stadium
United States	17
Argentina	7

=== Cup ===
Quarter-finals
5 May – 11:58 – Scotstoun Stadium
South Africa	22
United States	5
5 May – 12:20 – Scotstoun Stadium
Fiji	12
England	15
5 May – 12:42 – Scotstoun Stadium
Wales	26
Canada	7
5 May – 13:04 – Scotstoun Stadium
New Zealand	42
Argentina	10

Semi-finals
5 May – 15:58 – Scotstoun Stadium
South Africa	24
England	17
5 May – 16:20 – Scotstoun Stadium
Wales	14
New Zealand	26

Final
5 May – 18:45 – Scotstoun Stadium
South Africa	28
New Zealand	21
Third place
5 May – 18:16 – Scotstoun Stadium
England	24
Wales	21
