= 2012 Hong Kong Sevens =

Rugby union sevens tournament

- Host nation: Hong Kong
- Date: 23–25 March 2012

Cup
- Champion: Fiji
- Runner-up: New Zealand
- Third: South Africa

Plate
- Winner: Samoa
- Runner-up: Argentina

Bowl
- Winner: Kenya
- Runner-up: United States

Shield
- Winner: Canada
- Runner-up: Spain

Tournament details
- Matches played: 61
- Tries scored: 320 (average 5.25 per match)
- Most points: (Fiji) Metuisela Talebula (52 points)
- Most tries: (Samoa) Paul Perez (7 tries)

The 2012 Hong Kong Sevens was the 37th edition of the Hong Kong Sevens tournament and the sixth tournament of the 2011–12 IRB Sevens World Series. The host stadium was the Hong Kong Stadium.

Fiji won the title by defeating New Zealand 35–28 in the final.

== Format ==
The teams were divided into pools of four teams, who played a round-robin within the pool. Points were awarded in each pool on a different scale from that used in most rugby tournaments: 3 for a win, 2 for a draw, 1 for a loss.

However, new for 2012 was what was described by organisers as two separate 12-team competitions, called Competition 1 and Competition 2. Competition 1 contained the 12 core teams of the IRB Sevens circuit, who play in every event of the IRB Sevens circuit, in pools A, B and C.

Competition 2 contained 12 teams who had qualified through their performance in regional tournaments, in pools D, E and F. Four of these teams were from Asia; three from Europe; two from North America & Caribbean; one from Oceania; one from South America; and one from Africa. This competition also doubled as a qualifying tournament for the 2012–13 IRB Sevens circuit, where the two Qualifier (Shield) finalists and the winner of the 3rd/4th place playoff earned automatic participation in all events of the 2012–13 season. This resulted from the IRB's decision to increase the number of core teams to 15, effective in 2012–13.

Eight teams from Pools A, B and C, being the winners and runner-up from each pool, plus the best two 3rd placers, qualified for the Cup Quarter Finals. The losers of these Quarter Finals competed in the Plate Semifinals. The remaining four teams competed in the Bowl Semifinals.

Similarly, eight teams from Pools D, E and F qualified for the Qualifier (Shield) playoffs. The remaining four teams played in ranking matches.

== Merchandising ==
For this tournament, sportswear brand Kukri Sports teamed up with Hong Kong lifestyle retail store G.O.D. to produce merchandising. The products, carried the specially designed "Kukri x G.O.D." logo, which features elements of the original Hong Kong flag, and ranges from polos, traditional Chinese jackets, boxers, Cheongsam-inspired ladies polo, messenger and tote bags. A percentage of sales went to the Foodlink Foundation, supported by both companies.

== Teams ==
24 teams participated:

Competition 1

- Argentina
- Australia
- England
- Fiji
- France
- Kenya
- New Zealand
- Samoa
- Scotland
- South Africa
- United States
- Wales

Competition 2

- Canada
- China
- Guyana
- Hong Kong
- Japan
- Philippines
- Portugal
- Russia
- Spain
- Tonga
- Uruguay
- Zimbabwe

== Pool stage ==
The draw was made on February 16.

Key to colours in group tables
Teams that advanced to the Cup Quarterfinal
Teams that advanced to the Bowl Semifinal
Teams that advanced to the Qualifier (Shield) Quarterfinal
Teams that advanced to the Ranking Matches

=== Pool A ===
Pos	Team	Pld	W	D	L	PF	PA	PD	Pts
1	Samoa	3	3	0	0	60	19	+41	9
2	England	3	2	0	1	52	41	+11	7
3	Argentina	3	1	0	2	29	53	−24	5
4	Kenya	3	0	0	3	31	59	−28	3

23 March 2012
17:50

Samoa	19 − 7	Kenya
	Report

Hong Kong Stadium, Hong Kong

23 March 2012
20:30

England	19 − 10	Argentina
	Report

Hong Kong Stadium, Hong Kong

24 March 2012
11:20

England	21 − 17	Kenya
	Report

Hong Kong Stadium, Hong Kong

24 March 2012
14:16

Samoa	27 − 0	Argentina
	Report

Hong Kong Stadium, Hong Kong

24 March 2012
16:28

Argentina	19 − 7	Kenya
	Report

Hong Kong Stadium, Hong Kong

24 March 2012
19:30

Samoa	14 − 12	England
	Report

Hong Kong Stadium, Hong Kong

=== Pool B ===
Pos	Team	Pld	W	D	L	PF	PA	PD	Pts
1	New Zealand	3	3	0	0	72	22	+50	9
2	South Africa	3	2	0	1	35	26	+9	7
3	Wales	3	1	0	2	49	41	+8	5
4	United States	3	0	0	3	19	86	−67	3

23 March 2012
17:28

New Zealand	29 – 5	United States
	Report

Hong Kong Stadium, Hong Kong

23 March 2012
20:08

South Africa	10 – 0	Wales
	Report

Hong Kong Stadium, Hong Kong

24 March 2012
10:58

South Africa	15 – 7	United States
	Report

Hong Kong Stadium, Hong Kong

24 March 2012
13:54

New Zealand	24 – 7	Wales
	Report

Hong Kong Stadium, Hong Kong

24 March 2012
16:06

Wales	42 – 7	United States
	Report

Hong Kong Stadium, Hong Kong

24 March 2012
19:08

New Zealand	19 – 10	South Africa
	Report

Hong Kong Stadium, Hong Kong

=== Pool C ===
Pos	Team	Pld	W	D	L	PF	PA	PD	Pts
1	Fiji	3	3	0	0	87	22	+65	9
2	Australia	3	2	0	1	65	46	+19	7
3	Scotland	3	1	0	2	33	80	−47	5
4	France	3	0	0	3	34	71	−37	3

23 March 2012
17:06

Fiji	39 – 5	Scotland
	Report

Hong Kong Stadium, Hong Kong

23 March 2012
19:46

Australia	31 – 10	France
	Report

Hong Kong Stadium, Hong Kong

24 March 2012
10:36

Australia	29 – 14	Scotland
	Report

Hong Kong Stadium, Hong Kong

24 March 2012
13:32

Fiji	26 – 12	France
	Report

Hong Kong Stadium, Hong Kong

24 March 2012
15:44

France	12 – 14	Scotland

Hong Kong Stadium, Hong Kong

24 March 2012
18:46

Fiji	22 – 5	Australia
	Report

Hong Kong Stadium, Hong Kong

=== Pool D ===
Pos	Team	Pld	W	D	L	PF	PA	PD	Pts
1	Hong Kong	3	3	0	0	75	26	+49	9
2	Tonga	3	2	0	1	73	53	+20	7
3	China	3	1	0	2	46	88	−42	5
4	Uruguay	3	0	0	3	52	79	−27	3

23 March 2012
16:44

Tonga	33 – 12	China
	Report

Hong Kong Stadium, Hong Kong

23 March 2012
19:24

Uruguay	14 – 17	Hong Kong
	Report

Hong Kong Stadium, Hong Kong

24 March 2012
10:14

Uruguay	26 – 29	China
	Report

Hong Kong Stadium, Hong Kong

24 March 2012
13:10

Tonga	7 – 29	Hong Kong
	Report

Hong Kong Stadium, Hong Kong

24 March 2012
15:22

Hong Kong	29 – 5	China
	Report

Hong Kong Stadium, Hong Kong

24 March 2012
18:24

Tonga	33 – 12	Uruguay
	Report

Hong Kong Stadium, Hong Kong

=== Pool E ===
Pos	Team	Pld	W	D	L	PF	PA	PD	Pts
1	Canada	3	2	0	1	66	36	+30	7
2	Spain	3	2	0	1	47	20	+27	7
3	Zimbabwe	3	2	0	1	50	57	−7	7
4	Philippines	3	0	0	3	27	77	−50	3

23 March 2012
16:22

Canada	35 – 5	Philippines
	Report

Hong Kong Stadium, Hong Kong

23 March 2012
19:02

Spain	19 – 5	Zimbabwe
	Report

Hong Kong Stadium, Hong Kong

24 March 2012
09:52

Spain	21 – 5	Philippines
	Report

Hong Kong Stadium, Hong Kong

24 March 2012
12:48

Canada	21 – 24	Zimbabwe
	Report

Hong Kong Stadium, Hong Kong

24 March 2012
15:00

Zimbabwe	21 – 17	Philippines
	Report

Hong Kong Stadium, Hong Kong

24 March 2012
18:02

Canada	10 – 7	Spain
	Report

Hong Kong Stadium, Hong Kong

=== Pool F ===
Pos	Team	Pld	W	D	L	PF	PA	PD	Pts
1	Portugal	3	3	0	0	62	32	+30	9
2	Russia	3	2	0	1	38	36	+2	7
3	Japan	3	1	0	2	67	45	+22	5
4	Guyana	3	0	0	3	17	71	−54	3

23 March 2012
16:00

Portugal	19 – 0	Guyana
	Report

Hong Kong Stadium, Hong Kong

23 March 2012
18:40

Russia	14 – 7	Japan

Hong Kong Stadium, Hong Kong

24 March 2012
09:30

Russia	14 – 12	Guyana
	Report

Hong Kong Stadium, Hong Kong

24 March 2012
12:26

Portugal	26 – 22	Japan
	Report

Hong Kong Stadium, Hong Kong

24 March 2012
14:38

Japan	38 – 5	Guyana
	Report

Hong Kong Stadium, Hong Kong

24 March 2012
17:40

Portugal	17 – 10	Russia
	Report

Hong Kong Stadium, Hong Kong

== Knockout stage ==
=== Cup ===
Quarter-finals
25 March – Hong Kong
Fiji	26
Argentina	7
25 March – Hong Kong
Australia	14
England	19
25 March – Hong Kong
Samoa	14
South Africa	27
25 March – Hong Kong
New Zealand	31
Wales	7

Semi-finals
25 March – Hong Kong
Fiji	14
England	7
25 March – Hong Kong
South Africa	12
New Zealand	19

Final
25 March – Hong Kong
Fiji	35
New Zealand	28
Third place
25 March – Hong Kong
England	0
South Africa	28

=== Plate ===
Semi-finals
25 March – Hong Kong
Argentina	21
Australia	12
25 March – Hong Kong
Samoa	34
Wales	7

Final
25 March – Hong Kong
Argentina	10
Samoa	12

=== Bowl ===
Semi-finals
25 March – Hong Kong
Scotland	14
United States	28
25 March – Hong Kong
Kenya	29
France	0

Final
25 March – Hong Kong
United States	12
Kenya	14

=== Qualifier (Shield) ===
Quarter-finals
25 March – Hong Kong
Hong Kong	5
Japan	10
25 March – Hong Kong
Spain	19
Tonga	7
25 March – Hong Kong
Canada	24
Russia	7
25 March – Hong Kong
Portugal	21
Zimbabwe	17

Semi-finals
25 March – Hong Kong
Japan	12
Spain	17
25 March – Hong Kong
Canada	14
Portugal	12

Final
25 March – Hong Kong
Spain	5
Canada	22
Third place
25 March – Hong Kong
Japan	19
Portugal	33

=== Ranking Matches ===
Semi-finals
25 March – Hong Kong
China	5
Guyana	7
25 March – Hong Kong
Uruguay	22
Philippines	5

Final
25 March – Hong Kong
Guyana	0
Uruguay	31
