= Dan Norton =

English rugby union player (born 1988)

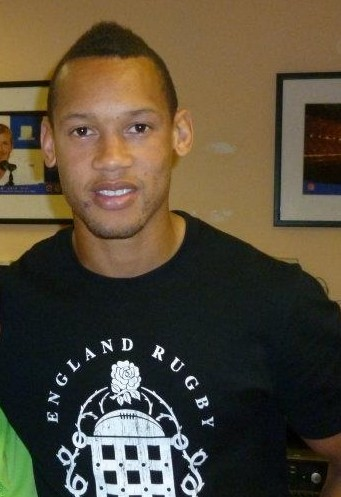
- Norton in 2012
- Born: Daniel John Norton; 22 March 1988 (age 38) Gloucester, England
- Height: 1.82 m (6 ft 0 in)
- Weight: 85 kg (187 lb)
- School: Brockworth Enterprise School
- University: Hartpury College

Rugby union career
- Position(s): Wing, Fullback
Senior career
Years	Team	Apps	(Points)
2007–2009	Gloucester	1	(0)
2007–2009	→ Moseley (loan)	37	(120)
2009–2011	Bristol	31	(90)
2011–	Hartpury College	7	(55)
2020	London Irish		
National sevens teams
Years	Team		Comps
2009–2022	England 7s		91
2016, 2020	Great Britain		2
Medal record
Men's rugby sevens
Representing Great Britain
Olympic Games
Silver medal – second place	2016 Rio de Janeiro	Team competition
Representing England
Commonwealth Games
Bronze medal – third place	2018 Gold Coast	Team competition

Daniel John Norton (born 22 March 1988) is a former rugby union player. He is the leading all-time try scorer in the World Rugby Sevens Series with over 350 tries, beating the previous record of 244 held by Kenya's Collins Injera at the 2017 Hong Kong Sevens tournament.

A product of Hartpury College, Norton played most of his career as a winger. Norton was part of the Gloucester academy and dual registered with Moseley for both the 2007–08 and 2008–09 seasons. Moving on to Bristol Bears (Previously Bristol Rugby) from the 2009–10 and 2010–11 seasons.

Norton won a silver medal at the Rio 2016 Summer Olympics, he scored a try in the final, but was unable to prevent a 43-7 drubbing by Fiji. He helped the England rugby sevens team secure bronze at the 2018 Commonwealth Games in the Gold Coast with a 21–14 win over South Africa and the same side that won silver at the Rugby World Cup Sevens in San Francisco 2018.

== International ==
Norton helped England U20s to a Six Nations Grand Slam title in 2008. He also competed for the England U18s in the 2006–07 season.

=== Sevens career ===
Norton made his sevens debut for England in 2009.

During the 2010–2011 season, Norton's main focus was on rugby sevens, playing in the Commonwealth Games and a regular in the IRB Sevens World Series. Norton has been a core-contracted Sevens player to the RFU since the 2011–12 season. Norton scored 37 tries in the 2011–12 series – second only to England teammate Mat Turner with 38. In December 2012, Norton scored his 100th career try for England against Scotland in Port Elizabeth, South Africa. Norton led all try-scorers in the 2012–13 season with 52 tries. He is top of the all-time list of try scorers on the World Rugby Sevens Series.

Norton possesses great speed, the ability to sidestep off either foot and the ability to kick off both feet. Norton is one of the quickest players on the 7s circuit, with a personal best for the 40m of 4.78 seconds.

Norton announced his retirement from rugby in April 2022 following the Vancouver sevens.

== Club ==
Norton made his name at Hartpury College where his dynamic performances on the wing and at fullback earned him a senior contract with Gloucester from 2007 to 2009. He played for Moseley, while on loan from Gloucester, between 2007 and 2009. In 2009, He helped Moseley win the EDF National Trophy when he scored a try against Leeds in the final at Twickenham.

In April 2009, it was announced that Norton would be joining Bristol for the next season. Norton played the start of the 2009–2010 for Bristol and soon established himself as the top scorer, as Bristol reached the Championship play-off final in 2010, going on to win the British & Irish Cup in 2011. However, after returning from England sevens duty his time with the different format seemed to lose his edge, and was not given enough time to convert, becoming a bit part player for the rest of the season. Although he re-established himself in the B&I Cup winning Bristol side at the end of the 2010–11 season, he was not included in the Bristol retained players list announced at the end of May 2011.

Norton joined London Irish on a short-term contract in August 2020. He was an ambassador for Mizuno.

== Honours ==
Yes

=== Bristol ===
- British and Irish Cup: 2011

=== England ===
- Dubai 7s: 2011
