= Waisale Serevi =

Fijian rugby union and coach (born 1968)

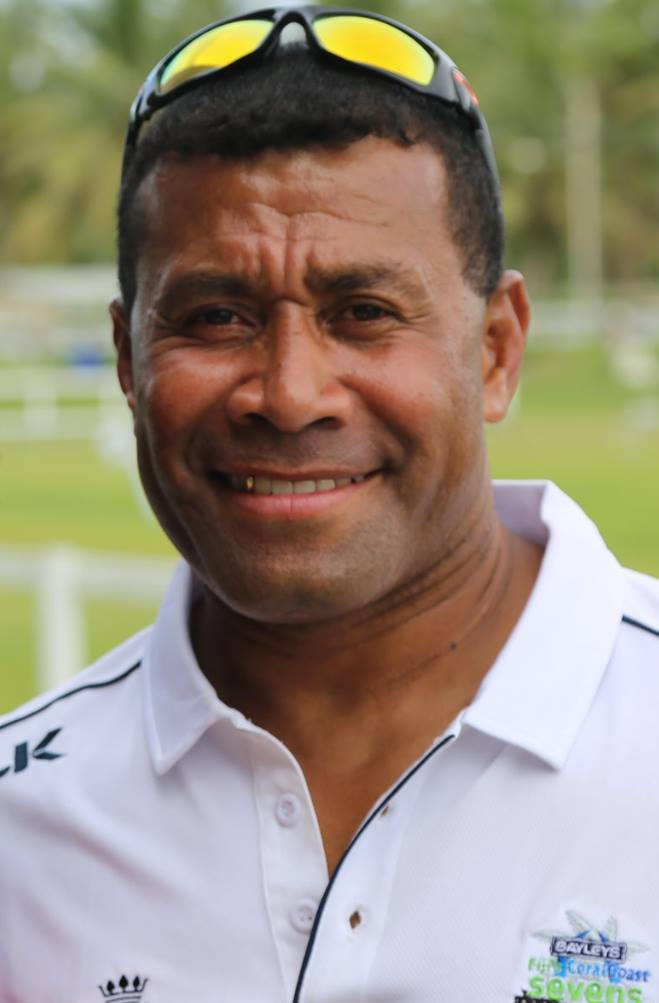
- Serevi in 2014
- Born: Waisale Tikoisolomoni Serevi; 20 May 1968 (age 58) Suva, Fiji
- Height: 1.69 m (5 ft 7 in)
- Weight: 85 kg (13 st 5 lb; 187 lb)
- School: Delainamasi Government School; Lelean Memorial School

Rugby union career
- Position(s): Fly-half, Fullback, Scrum-half
Amateur team(s)
Years	Team	Apps	(Points)
- Nasinu
1987–88	Rewa		
1989	Nabua		
1989	Suva		
- Correct as of 14 March 2007
Senior career
Years	Team	Apps	(Points)
1993–96	Mitsubishi	0	(0)
1997–98	Leicester		
1998–2003	Stade Montois		
2004	Stade Bordelais		
2004–08	Staines		
- Correct as of 14 March 2007
International career
Years	Team	Apps	(Points)
1987	Fiji B		
1987	Fiji XV		
1989–03	Fiji	39	(219)
- Correct as of 14 March 2007
National sevens team
Years	Team		Comps
1990–07	Fiji		359
- Correct as of 9 July 2007
Coaching career
- Years: Team
- 2005–07: Fiji Sevens
- 2008–09: Fiji Sevens
- 2018–19: Russia Sevens
- Correct as of 28 November 2019
Medal record
Men's rugby sevens
Representing Fiji
Rugby World Cup Sevens
Gold medal – first place	1997 HongKong	Team competition
Gold medal – first place	2005 HongKong	Team competition
Commonwealth Games
Silver medal – second place	1998 Kuala Lumpur	Team competition
Silver medal – second place	2002 Manchester	Team competition
Bronze medal – third place	2006 Melbourne	Team competition

Waisale Tikoisolomoni Serevi (born 20 May 1968) is a Fijian former rugby union football player and coach, and is a member of the World Rugby Hall of Fame. Serevi is renowned for his achievements in rugby sevens, while also enjoying a long career in fifteen-a-side rugby at both club and national team levels. Nicknamed "The Wizard" by commentators, he is widely considered to be the greatest rugby sevens player in the history of the game. A biography of Serevi titled Waisale Serevi: King of Sevens by Nick Darvenzi was published in 2018.

In the 15-man game, he played for Fiji 39 times between 1989 and 2003, and scored 376 points. This included representing Fiji in the 1991, 1999, and 2003 Rugby World Cups. He also played professionally for the Mitsubishi, Leicester, Stade Montois, Stade Bordelais and Staines rugby teams.

His representative sevens career started in 1989 when he played for Fiji at the Hong Kong tournament. Serevi also played in the 1993, 1997, 2001, and 2005 Rugby World Cup Sevens, winning the World Cup with Fiji in 1997 and 2005. He won silver at the Commonwealth Games in 1998 and 2002, and captured bronze in 2006. Serevi played in the International Rugby Board Sevens Series since its creation in 1999. In 2005 after winning the 2005 Rugby World Cup Sevens Serevi was appointed player-coach of the Fiji Sevens national team. He led Fiji to the 2005–06 World Sevens Series victory – the first time the series was won by a team other than New Zealand.

== Early life ==
The third of five children, Serevi was born in Suva, on the island of Viti Levu, on 20 May 1968. He was raised by staunch Christian parents who were both heavily involved in the Church. Serevi's inspiration to play rugby stemmed from his childhood, when Fiji defeated the British Lions in 1977. He missed watching the match, but decided to take up rugby after seeing how happy the victory made the people of Fiji.

His family moved twice when he was a child, the second time settling in Suva where Serevi started secondary school. There he attended Lelean Memorial School. His schooling was unsuccessful however, and he failed his Fiji Junior Certificate Examination (tenth year) in 1984. Serevi blamed his love for rugby, saying he "played too much and didn't spend enough time studying."

After failing his examinations, Serevi quit school and continued to play for his local club Rewa. Although he trained with the team, he was omitted from playing as the coach, Jo Rauto, thought he was too small and would get hurt. He was eventually selected to play for the senior provincial side when he was 17. Several months later he was asked to join the Nabua Rugby Club – under the guidance of coach Ratu Kitione Tuibua – by his uncle Vesito Rauluni. Serevi's Nabua team were highly successful in Fiji's sevens tournaments.

== Fifteens career ==
=== Club ===
Prior to 1993 he played for the Nasinu Rugby Club in the Suva Club Rugby Competition, and represented Suva on numerous occasions. In 1993 Serevi signed for the Mitsubishi team from Kyoto, Japan. His initial salary was A$70,000 a year before this increased to A$90,000 a year. While with Mitsubishi in 1994, Serevi was approached by Australian Rugby League clubs the Canberra Raiders, and later the Brisbane Crushers to play for them. After being set to join the Crushers, Serevi decided to stay with Mitsubishi due to a pay rise, and pressure from Fiji's Methodist Church to continue playing rugby union.

Serevi continued to play for Mitsubishi until 1997 when he joined English club Leicester on a two-year contract. He was first approached by Leicester after he played against them for a World XV at Twickenham in 1996. He stayed at Leicester for only one season before moving to the French club Stade Montois in Mont-de-Marsan.

After joining Stade Montois, Serevi moved to the coaching staff due to the second level sides only being allowed to play two non-European Union players. After getting clearance from the French Rugby Federation, Serevi was cleared to play for the club in 2001. He continued there until joining Stade Bordelais in January 2004. In late 2004 Serevi joined London club Staines; making his debut in a victory against Thurrock in December that year. Serevi stopped playing professional club rugby in 2005.

=== International ===
In 1987 Serevi was selected for the Fiji B team, and the following year he was selected for Fiji, playing against Wellington in New Zealand. The Wellington game was his first in front of a large crowd, and he had mixed feelings about making his debut in front of a huge crowd. The next year he made his Test debut against Belgium in Liege.

After being a regular selection for Fiji in 1989, and playing three games in 1990, Serevi was selected in the 1991 Rugby World Cup squad. He played against France and Canada, losing both games. He only played four fifteen-aside games for Fiji in 1992 and 1993 – with Fiji losing all four. These results led to Fiji failing to qualify for the 1995 Rugby World Cup in South Africa. In 1996 Serevi was selected for his first Fiji game since 1993. The match was against Northland in Whangārei, and resulted in a 49–18 win; Serevi's first win with the national team since 1991. He was selected for seven games in 1996, including matches against South Africa and the New Zealand Māori.

Serevi did not play for Fiji in the 1997 season, but did come on against Scotland in Fiji's 51–26 win at Suva in 1998. He was continually selected throughout 1998, and played Tests against France, US, Australia, Tonga and Samoa. The following year he again played for Fiji; including consecutive wins over Spain, Uruguay, and Italy. Fiji qualified for the 1999 Rugby World Cup in France, with Serevi playing in three of Fiji's matches – including wins over Namibia and Canada.

Following the 1999 Rugby World Cup, Serevi did not play for Fiji again until 2001. In that year he came on against an Italian regional XV after 57 minutes and scored two tries, two conversions and two penalties to help his team to a 33–23 victory. This was followed by a match against Italy where he scored all of Fiji's points (Fiji lost 10–66). He played two more matches for Fiji that season, including a win over the French Barbarians, in which Serevi was captain.

In 2002 Serevi played four matches for Fiji – all were losses; first against Wales, then Ireland, Scotland A, and Scotland. Serevi's last season for Fiji was in 2003, where he played several matches in build-up to the Rugby World Cup in Australia. These matches included wins over the Queensland Reds, Marlborough, and Chile. His last match for Fiji was a 41–13 win over Japan in the 2003 Rugby World Cup; his third Rugby World Cup tournament.

== Sevens career ==
=== 1989–93 ===
After playing domestics sevens in Fiji, Serevi was selected for Fiji for the Sydney Sevens tournament in 1989. Later that year he made his début at the Hong Kong Sevens. Although New Zealand won the tournament, beating Fiji in their semi-final, Serevi was named player of the tournament. Serevi returned in 1990 when Fiji won their first of three consecutive Hong Kong Sevens titles, and he again picked up player of the tournament after Fiji defeated New Zealand in the final. In 1992 Serevi was again named the player of the tournament.

At the 1993 Hong Kong Sevens, Serevi scored three tries to help Fiji to a 17–14 win over Australia in the semi-final, but was unable to prevent his team being defeated 14–12 in the final by Samoa. Fiji's next major tournament was the inaugural 1993 Rugby Sevens World Cup held in Edinburgh, Scotland. (Note: Rugby sevens was invented in Scotland, and first played in Melrose in 1883.) Serevi said that the team was working "sometimes nine hours a day" in preparation for the Sevens World Cup. Fiji were defeated by eventual champions England 21–7 in their semi-final. Serevi was the equal top point scorer for the tournament.

=== 1994–99 ===
After playing in sevens tournaments in Fiji and Canberra, Serevi returned to the Hong Kong Sevens. After defeating South Africa in their quarter-final, Fiji lost to eventual winners New Zealand in their semi-final. In 1995, Serevi captained Fiji to the Hong Kong Sevens final. He scored three tries in their semi-final victory over Australia. They then faced New Zealand in the final, and although leading 17–14 at one point, eventually lost the game 35–17. In the 1996 tournament, Fiji again met New Zealand in the final; New Zealand led after Serevi tripped Christian Cullen close to Fiji's try line. This was followed by a break from Serevi to give Setareki Naivaluwaqa a try. New Zealand scored twice more however, to give them a 19–17 victory. Serevi finished the year by leading Fiji to victory in the Dubai Sevens.

The following year the Hong Kong Sevens doubled as the 1997 Rugby Sevens World Cup. Serevi was Fiji's captain for the tournament. Before the tournament Serevi made a promise to Fiji to "bring back the Melrose Cup." In his first three games of the tournament Serevi scored 59 points to help confirm Fiji as favourites for the title. Fiji did not concede a point until their semi-final, their sixth game of the tournament, and eventually faced South Africa in the final. South Africa scored two tries, before Fiji responded with four tries of their own; the final score was 24–21 to Fiji. Serevi was the tournament's top scorer with 117 points – including nine tries. He also played for Fiji in the Japan and France sevens; the latter won by Fiji.

After winning the Fiji Sevens Tournament with Fiji in March 1998, Serevi led his country at Hong Kong. Despite a 21–21 draw against Argentina in pool play – where Serevi scored one try and set up two – Fiji qualified for the tournament's quarter-finals. Fiji beat Australia in the quarter-finals, and faced New Zealand in their semi-final. They defeated New Zealand 24–7 after Serevi scored one try and set up another two. Fiji faced Samoa in the final, defeating them 28–19. Serevi was named player of the tournament. Later that year he led Fiji in the Rugby Sevens at the 1998 Commonwealth Games in Kuala Lumpur. The team faced New Zealand in the final, losing 21–12, to earn them the silver medal.

=== 1999–04 ===
Serevi started 1999 by winning the Air Pacific Sevens in Fiji; they defeated Australian Fijians 35–7. Following this Serevi captained Fiji to the Hong Kong Sevens, his eleventh tournament. Fiji defeated Tonga – whose defeat included a try set up by a 40-metre one handed pass from Serevi – and then Scotland. Fiji and Serevi again faced New Zealand in the final; Fiji scored three tries, all converted by Serevi, to win 21–12. Serevi dedicated the win to his two daughters.

In 1999 the inaugural International Rugby Board Sevens series was held starting with the Dubai tournament. Serevi missed this leg, but finished the year by leading Fiji to victory in the South Africa Sevens in Stellenbosch. Serevi then returned for the leg in Mar Del Plata where he scored a try to lead Fiji to victory over New Zealand in the final. He then led Fiji in their first sevens tournament in New Zealand, at Wellington. Fiji again defeated New Zealand in a tournament final, this time 24–14. Serevi was the tournaments top points scorer (84 points). Serevi also played in the Fiji Sevens tournament, where Fiji lost to New Zealand 31–5 in the final. He then led Fiji to victory in the Brisbane leg of the series. Fiji made the final after defeating South Africa in their semi-final; the final was against Australia, who were leading until the last minute of the match. With less than a minute to go Serevi broke several Australian tackles and sprinted 80 metres to score a try and win the match for Fiji. The try was described at the time by Australian rugby union writer Spiro Zavos as "the greatest individual try in sevens series history", and was voted try of the year at the 2000 Fiji Rugby Awards. At the Hong Kong Sevens, Serevi was the tournament's top scorer with 75 points, but this was not enough for a Fiji win however, as they lost 31–5 to New Zealand in the final. Serevi's last tournament of the series was in Japan where he led Fiji to victory.

Serevi started 2001 by leading Fiji in the 2001 Rugby World Cup Sevens in Argentina. Fiji were defeated by Australia in their semi-final; the Australians went on to lose to New Zealand in the final. In the 2000–01 IRB Sevens World Series, he played in only the London and Wales legs. He also missed the 2001 Hong Kong Sevens, the first time he had missed the tournament in 12 years. Serevi was omitted from the team due to form, and the desire to develop new players for the 2004 Rugby World Cup Sevens. Fiji's coach at the time, Tomasi Cama, suggested Serevi had lost some pace and age was catching up with him. Serevi's last sevens tournament for the year was the World Games in Akita, Japan. As captain, he led Fiji to the Gold medal after defeating Australia 35–19 in the final.

The first tournament of 2002 for Serevi was in Chile. Fiji advanced to the semi-finals where they faced New Zealand. During the match, Serevi was tackled late by New Zealander Amasio Valence. Fijian player Marika Vunibaka ran 50 metres to punch Valence and a brawl then erupted – Fiji ended up losing the game. Serevi and Fiji rebounded the following week to win the tournament at Mar del Plata, Buenos Aires. Serevi played in the Brisbane, Wellington, and then Beijing Sevens before returning to Hong Kong. In Fiji's defeat of Australia in their quarter-final, Serevi scored 13 points to take his Hong Kong points tally over 1000. Fiji defeated New Zealand in their semi-final and faced England in the final. England defeated Fiji 33–20 in the final. Later that year Serevi captained Fiji to the 2002 Commonwealth Games in Manchester. He helped get the team to the games' final with a try-saving tackle during Fiji's 17–7 defeat of South Africa in their semi-final. The final was against New Zealand, and despite Serevi landing a penalty to give Fiji a 15–14 lead with two minutes left, New Zealand won 33–17. This gave Serevi his second Commonwealth Games silver medal.

Serevi did not represent Fiji in sevens in 2003, being controversially omitted from Fiji's Hong Kong Sevens squad. Serevi had been unable to return to Fiji for a fitness test and national tournament due to commitments with his club Stade Montois in France. Because of this, he was omitted from the team, despite being available to play in the tournament.

After recovering from his injury, Serevi was named in the Fiji sevens squad in January 2004. This was despite a rule enforced by coach Senivalati Laulau that to be eligible to play, one must attend the team's trials. After being named in the training squad, Serevi was not selected for the squad for the Wellington or Los Angeles legs of the IRB World Sevens Series. He then missed selection for the team to play in Hong Kong for the second year in a row. Pauliasi Tabulutu replaced Laulau as Fiji's coach and recalled Serevi to play in the Bordeaux Sevens. Serevi then played in the London leg of the Sevens Series – his last leg of the year.

=== 2005–07: player-coach ===
Serevi started the year by leading the Lomaiviti Barbarians in the Pacific 7s in Auckland, New Zealand. He returned to Fiji, from his club Staines in England, in February that year in an attempt to play for Fiji in the 2005 Rugby World Cup Sevens. On returning to Fiji, Serevi said "My goal is to go to the World Cup". After being selected by coach Wayne Pivac for the Fiji squad, Serevi was named as captain.

Led by Serevi, Fiji qualified for the quarter-finals of the Sevens World Cup at Hong Kong, with pool victories over Australia, Canada, Hong Kong, Japan and Portugal. After the pool matches, Pivac said of Serevi; "Waisale is the eyes for the other guys" and "he brings the others into the game and puts players into gaps." After scoring the match-winning try in sudden death against England in their semi-final, Serevi led Fiji to World Cup victory over New Zealand in the final. He finished the tournament as the World Cup's all-time leading points scorer and goal scorer, and the second highest all-time try scorer.

A national holiday – 24 March 2005 – was declared in Fiji for the teams return, and the country's Prime Minister Laisenia Qarase declared:

On behalf of the Government and people of Fiji and personally, I convey our congratulations to you all – Serevi and the team members, and the management and coaching staff.

Serevi was appointed Pivac's successor as Fiji coach on 30 March, and soon after he returned to his village in Qarani to show its people the Melrose Cup.

Serevi's first tournament as coach was the Singapore leg of the IRB Sevens Series; Fiji was defeated by England in their semi-final. The last two legs of the 2004–05 IRB Sevens Series were played in London and Paris. There he coached Fiji to the Plate victory, and a final loss respectively. His first major trophy as coach came when Fiji won gold in the 2005 World Games in Germany.

For the entire 2005–06 IRB Sevens Series Serevi was Fiji's player-coach (his assistant coach was Jo Savou). Fiji won the George leg in South Africa, the Wellington leg in New Zealand, the Singapore leg, and the London leg in England. The team also made the final of the Dubai, Los Angeles, and Hong Kong legs of the series. Fiji won the Series – becoming the first team other than New Zealand to do so. Following the series win Prime Minister Qarase said of Serevi:

You have set an example of what we can do as a country through vision, sacrifice, hard work, discipline, and making the best use of our gifts and talents.

In Fiji, celebrations of the win even included a specially composed song dedicated to Serevi named Na Noda Laione.

As well as coaching Fiji to the IRB Series win in 2006, Serevi also coached them to bronze at the 2006 Commonwealth Games in Melbourne. There Fiji faced England in their semi-final, but Serevi was unable to take the field due to "a technical hitch with the fourth official." After losing to England, Fiji recovered to defeat Australia 24–17 in the play-off for bronze.

In December 2006 Serevi was offered a coaching position with the Falcons, a South African side. The offer was several times more than he received from the Fiji Rugby Union. The contract required him to be a backline coach and player for two years, and then a coach for the next three years. In the end he decided to instead renew his contract with the Fiji Rugby Union. In early 2007 the interim Sports Minister Lekh Ram Vayeshnoi appointed Serevi to the board of the interim Fiji Sports Council.

Serevi coached Fiji to the final of the first Sevens Series leg of 2007 in Wellington, where they lost to Samoa 17–14 in the final. The team then rebounded when they defeated Samoa to win the San Diego leg. Fiji's next tournament was Hong Kong where Serevi made a world record 18th appearance. He scored the final try as Fiji defeated New Zealand in Hong Kong. They then faced Samoa in the final; Samoa led 27–0 at half time. Although Fiji then scored 22 points in the second half, Samoa won the final 27–22. Fiji won the following tournament at Adelaide, but only after a converted try by Serevi forcing extra time in their quarter final with South Africa.

Serevi then coached Fiji to the final of the London leg, where they were defeated by New Zealand. The final leg of the 2006–07 Series was in Edinburgh. Fiji needed to qualify for the semi-finals to guarantee they would win the series. They qualified top of pool A and faced Wales in their quarter-final. Wales defeated Fiji in 21–14 in a major upset. "Wales kept the ball well against us, and they scored tries. They deserved to win," Serevi said of the loss. New Zealand then won the tournament, making them the series champions after accumulating 130 points to Fiji's 128. On 6 July 2007, Serevi announced his resignation as coach of the national sevens team.

=== 2007–09: Coach ===
On 23 July 2008, the Fiji Rugby Union announced the return of Serevi as Fiji's coach for the 2008–09 IRB World Sevens Series and the Rugby Sevens World Cup in Dubai. At the time of the announcement, Serevi was in England receiving an honorary sports degree from Leeds Metropolitan University. Fiji Rugby Union chairman Keni Dakuidreketi denied that Serevi's selection was a result of the public clamour after the team's performance in the 2007–08 World Sevens Series under coach Jo Savou.

Despite his return, Serevi's team did not do well in the first two legs of the 2008–09 World Sevens Series, losing their semi-finals in both to South Africa. He also clashed with the Fiji Rugby Union over being left out of player selection duties. As a result, he was dismissed on 29 January 2009. Iliesa Tanivula took over the post for the rest of the series.

In August 2009, the Papua New Guinea Rugby Football Union (PNGRFU) hired Serevi to become their sevens development officer on a five-year contract. He was later appointed the national sevens coach. However, on 27 March 2010, the PNGRFU confirmed that the working relationship with Serevi was finished. Union president Richard Sapias said off-field decisions prompted the severing of relations, especially after Papua New Guinea performed poorly at the Adelaide sevens.

=== 2010–present ===
Seeking a fresh start a few months after his departure from the Papua New Guinea team, Serevi moved his family to the United States and settled in Seattle, Washington, to run a business with Fijian expatriates. He used his experience in rugby to open a new brand, the Serevi Rugby Nation, to help pool funds for Pacific Islander players and also run rugby training workshops for the youth. He also worked with the Old Puget Sound Rugby club, and helped Central Washington University qualify for the Collegiate Rugby Championships. He returned in May 2013 to Fiji as a trainer at the London sevens and became assistant coach under Alivereti Dere for the 2013 Rugby World Cup Sevens in Russia.

During his sevens career, Serevi made numerous guest appearances around the world including the 3 Rifles (army) sevens tournament at Dreghorn military barracks, Edinburgh. During this tournament, Serevi was famously red carded and sent to the bench due to violent conduct after clothes lining Edinburgh Northern RFC player Rory "Pain Train" Legge, who attempted an audacious chip and run.

== Personal life ==
Serevi married his wife, Karalaini, in 1993. They have three children; daughters Unaisi Serevi (born 1994) and Asinate Serevi (Naruma) (born 1995), and son Waisale Serevi Junior (born 2000). His wife previously worked for the Fijian Defence Forces but retired in 1998 to fully devote herself to her family and her husband's rugby career. Serevi spent large parts of his career away from his family. He was apart from them when in Japan between 1992 and 1997, although his family joined him in France between 1999 and 2004. He is a committed Christian, and along with his family attends Church regularly. On his boots, strapping, and jersey for every match Serevi has the words "Philippians 4:13" written. It is a reference to the biblical quote "I can do all things through Christ who strengthens me".

Serevi learned Japanese while in Japan, and also taught English whilst there. Despite living in France for several years he did not learn French, and required an interpreter for interviews. Serevi's interests include listening to music, and watching movies. Apart from rugby, he also likes to play touch rugby and volleyball. Other interests include meeting people, and travelling the world.

On 18 May 2007, Serevi was appointed a Special Inspector with the Fiji Police Force by the acting Commissioner of Police Romanu Tikotikoca. The appointment is in youth and community policing. Serevi will not be a regular officer, but will be paid for the hours he works.

== Achievements ==
Serevi has been inducted into the Fiji Association of Sports and National Olympic Committee's Hall of Fame in 2005, and was named the Fiji Times 2005 Personality of the Year. In 2013, he was inducted into the IRB Hall of Fame – the first Fijian to receive the honour. His presentation took place at the Hong Kong Sevens tournament that year. At the time of Serevi's induction, Chairman Bernard Lapasset said:

He was an exceptional player who has excelled in both Sevens and Fifteens and achieved all that there is to achieve in Rugby Sevens … while also winning the hearts of fans around the world with his exciting and entertaining style of play.

In 2024, Serevi was an inaugural inductee into the Pasifika Rugby Hall of Fame.

=== XVs ===
- Rugby World Cup tournaments: 1991, 1999, 2003 (Note: Note Fiji did not qualify for the 1995 tournament.)
- **Barbarians matches**, versus: Scotland (2002), Leicester (2002 and 2003), London Irish (2003)
- **World XV matches**, versus: Leicester (1996 and 1997)

**Test statistics**
Team	Played	Won	Drawn	Lost	Tries	Conversions	Penalties	Drop goals	Points total
Argentina	1	0	0	1	0	1	0	0	2
Australia	1	0	0	1	1	2	2	0	15
Belgium	1	1	0	0	2	0	0	0	8
Canada	2	1	0	1	0	0	0	1	3
Chile	1	1	0	0	0	2	0	0	4
England	2	0	0	2	0	1	2	1	11
France	4	0	0	4	0	0	0	0	0
Ireland	1	0	0	1	0	1	0	0	2
Italy	2	1	0	1	2	1	1	0	15
Japan	2	2	0	0	2	4	1	0	19
Namibia	1	1	0	0	0	8	2	0	22
Samoa	4	1	0	3	1	3	3	0	20
Scotland	4	1	0	3	0	5	4	0	22
South Africa	1	0	0	1	0	0	0	0	0
Spain	1	1	0	0	1	2	0	0	9
Tonga	6	3	0	3	0	3	7	1	30
Uruguay	1	1	0	0	1	4	2	0	19
US	1	1	0	0	0	0	1	0	3
Wales	1	0	0	1	1	1	0	0	7
Total	**37**	**15**	**0**	**22**	**11**	**38**	**25**	**3**	**211**

=== Rugby sevens ===
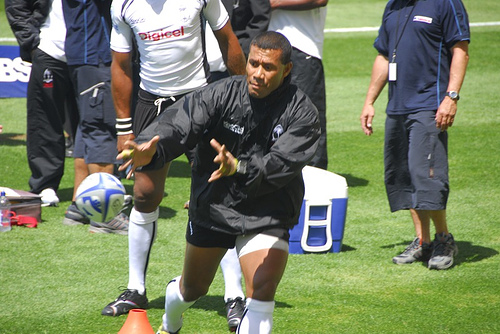
Waisale Serevi during the 2007 Wellington Sevens

==== Rugby World Cup Sevens ====
Serevi played in four Rugby World Cup Sevens (1993, 1997, 2001, and 2005). He won the tournament with Fiji in 1997 and 2005, and is the overall top points scorer with 297 points. He is also the second-top try scorer with 21 tries.

==== Commonwealth and World Games ====
Serevi competed in three Commonwealth Games; Kuala Lumpur in 1998, Manchester in 2002, and Melbourne in 2006. With Fiji he won silver in 1998 and 2002, and bronze in 2006. Serevi led Fiji to gold in both the 2001 World Games in Japan, and the 2005 World Games in Germany.

==== IRB Sevens World Series ====
The following is a list of IRB Sevens tournaments Serevi has participated in as a player. He is the series' fourth highest points scorer overall with 1310 points (79 tries, 457 goals). The list excludes Hong Kong legs, these are listed separately below. Those years in bold indicate Fiji won the tournament.

- Adelaide : 2007
- **Argentina** : **2002**
- **Bordeaux** : 2004, 2005
- **Brisbane** : **2000**, 2002
- **Chile** : 2002
- **China** : 2002
- Dubai : 2005, 2006
- Edinburgh : 2007
- **Fiji** : 1999, 2000
- **Japan** : **2000**
- George : **1999**, **2005**, 2006
- London : 2001, 2004, 2005, **2006**, 2007
- Paris : 2006
- **Wales** : 2001
- Singapore : **2006**
- Wellington : **2000**, 2002, **2006**, 2007
- US : 2006, 2007

==== Hong Kong Sevens ====
Results for all Hong Kong Sevens tournaments since Serevi's first in 1989. Table includes Rugby World Cup Sevens tournaments and IRB Sevens World Series legs.

Year	Placing	Comments
1989	losing semi-finalists	Player of the tournament
1990	Champions	Player of the tournament
1991	Champions	
1992	Champions	Player of the tournament
1993	Losing finalists	
1994	Losing semi-finalists	
1995	Losing finalists	
1996	Losing finalists	
1997	Champions	Tournament doubled as Rugby Sevens World Cup
1998	Champions	Player of the tournament
1999	Champions	
2000	Losing finalists	
2001	NA	Did not attend
2002	Losing finalists	
2003	NA	Did not attend
2004	NA	Did not attend
2005	Champions	Tournament doubled as Rugby Sevens World Cup
2006	Losing finalists	Serevi was player-coach
2007	Losing finalists	Serevi was player-coach
