= 2006 South Africa Sevens =

The 2006 South Africa Sevens was an international rugby sevens tournament which took place on 8–9 December at Outeniqua Park in George, Western Cape as part of the IRB Sevens World Series. The tournament was the second event of the 2006–07 season, and it was the eighth edition of the South Africa Sevens. New Zealand won the tournament, defeating the host nation South Africa by 24–17 in the final.

== Pool stages ==
=== Pool A ===
| Team | Pld | W | D | L | F | A | TOTAL |
|---|---|---|---|---|---|---|---|
| Fiji | 3 | 3 | 0 | 0 | 114 | 26 | 9 |
| Samoa | 3 | 2 | 0 | 1 | 64 | 67 | 7 |
| Canada | 3 | 1 | 0 | 2 | 43 | 53 | 5 |
| Zimbabwe | 3 | 0 | 0 | 3 | 19 | 94 | 3 |

Results
- Fiji 22–14 Canada
- Samoa 28–12 Zimbabwe
- Fiji 47–7 Zimbabwe
- Samoa 31–10 Canada
- Canada 19–0 Zimbabwe
- Fiji 45–5 Samoa

=== Pool B ===
| Team | Pld | W | D | L | F | A | TOTAL |
|---|---|---|---|---|---|---|---|
| England | 3 | 2 | 1 | 0 | 98 | 26 | 8 |
| Wales | 3 | 2 | 1 | 0 | 41 | 26 | 8 |
| Argentina | 3 | 1 | 0 | 2 | 33 | 48 | 5 |
| Portugal | 3 | 0 | 0 | 3 | 22 | 94 | 3 |

Results
- England 14–14 Wales
- Argentina 19–12 Portugal
- England 58–5 Portugal
- Argentina 7–10 Wales
- Wales 17–5 Portugal
- England 26–7 Argentina

=== Pool C ===
| Team | Pld | W | D | L | F | A | TOTAL |
|---|---|---|---|---|---|---|---|
| South Africa | 3 | 3 | 0 | 0 | 136 | 7 | 9 |
| France | 3 | 2 | 0 | 1 | 44 | 60 | 7 |
| Kenya | 3 | 1 | 0 | 2 | 59 | 67 | 5 |
| Uganda | 3 | 0 | 0 | 3 | 7 | 112 | 3 |

Results
- South Africa 45–7 Kenya
- France 22–7 Uganda
- South Africa 57–0 Uganda
- France 22–19 Kenya
- Kenya 33–0 Uganda
- South Africa 34–0 France

=== Group D ===
| Team | Pld | W | D | L | F | A | TOTAL |
|---|---|---|---|---|---|---|---|
| New Zealand | 3 | 3 | 0 | 0 | 97 | 19 | 9 |
| Tunisia | 3 | 2 | 0 | 1 | 54 | 59 | 7 |
| Australia | 3 | 1 | 0 | 2 | 57 | 62 | 5 |
| Scotland | 3 | 0 | 0 | 3 | 31 | 99 | 3 |

Results
- New Zealand 35–5 Scotland
- Australia 12–21 Tunisia
- New Zealand 33–0 Tunisia
- Australia 31–12 Scotland
- Scotland 14–33 Tunisia
- New Zealand 29–14 Australia

== Finals ==
- 1/4 final Bowl (Match 25) – Canada 19–12 Portugal
- 1/4 final Bowl (Match 26) – Australia 36–0 Uganda
- 1/4 final Bowl (Match 27) – Kenya 15–10 Scotland
- 1/4 final Bowl (Match 28) – Argentina 19–14 Zimbabwe
- 1/4 final Cup (Match 29) – Fiji 33–7 Wales
- 1/4 final Cup (Match 30) – New Zealand 29–0 France
- 1/4 final Cup (Match 31) – South Africa 38–0 Tunisia
- 1/4 final Cup (Match 32) – England 24–0 Samoa
- SF Shield (Match 33) – Portugal 31–5 Uganda
- SF Shield (Match 34) – Scotland 19–26 Zimbabwe
- SF Bowl (Match 35) – Canada 5–31 Australia
- SF Bowl (Match 36) – Kenya 19–17 Argentina
- SF Plate (Match 37) – Wales 29–24 France
- SF Plate (Match 38) – Tunisia 19–7 Samoa
- SF Cup (Match 39) – Fiji 12–29 New Zealand
- SF Cup (Match 40) – South Africa 10–7 England
- Final Shield (Match 41) – Portugal 14–12 Zimbabwe
- Final Bowl (Match 42) – Australia 41–7 Kenya
- Final Plate (Match 43) – Wales 26–5 Tunisia
- Final Cup (Match 44) – New Zealand 24–17 South Africa

== Series standings ==
After completion of Round 2:

| Pos. | Event Team | Dubai | George | Wellington | San Diego | Hong Kong | Adelaide | London | Edinburgh | Points total |
|---|---|---|---|---|---|---|---|---|---|---|
| 1 | South Africa | 20 | 16 | | | | | | | 36 |
| 1 | New Zealand | 16 | 20 | | | | | | | 36 |
| 3 | Fiji | 12 | 12 | | | | | | | 24 |
| 3 | England | 12 | 12 | | | | | | | 24 |
| 5 | Samoa | 8 | 4 | | | | | | | 12 |
| 6 | France | 6 | 4 | | | | | | | 10 |
| 7 | Wales | 0 | 8 | | | | | | | 8 |
| 8 | Australia | 4 | 2 | | | | | | | 6 |
| 8 | Tunisia | 0 | 6 | | | | | | | 6 |
| 10 | Canada | 4 | 0 | | | | | | | 4 |
| 11 | Argentina | 2 | 0 | | | | | | | 2 |
| 12 | Kenya | 0 | 0 | | | | | | | 0 |
| 12 | Portugal | 0 | 0 | | | | | | | 0 |
| 12 | Zimbabwe | 0 | 0 | | | | | | | 0 |
| 12 | Scotland | 0 | 0 | | | | | | | 0 |
| 12 | Arabian Gulf | 0 | – | | | | | | | 0 |
| 12 | Uganda | – | 0 | | | | | | | 0 |

New Zealand was the first team to score 1,000 all-time points in this round after beating France by 29–0 in the Cup quarter final stage.

Sevens World Series VIII
| Preceded by 2006 Dubai Sevens | 2006 South Africa Sevens | Succeeded by 2007 Wellington Sevens |
South Africa Sevens
| Preceded by 2005 South Africa Sevens | 2006 South Africa Sevens | Succeeded by 2007 South Africa Sevens |
