= Simon Cross (rugby union) =

Scottish rugby union player

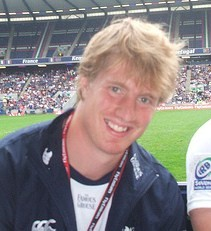
- Born: Simon Terriss Cross; 3 February 1981 (age 45) Mauritius
- Height: 6 ft 4 in (1.93 m)
- Weight: 16 st 11 lb (107 kg)
- Occupation: Professional rugby union coach

Rugby union career
- Position: Flanker
- Current team: Edinburgh Rugby
Amateur team(s)
Years	Team	Apps	(Points)
2008	Selkirk		
- Correct as of 22 June 2008
Senior career
Years	Team	Apps	(Points)
2000–2003	Wasps		
2003–2010	Edinburgh	48	
2006	→ Waterloo		
- Correct as of 4 May 2010
National sevens team
Years	Team		Comps
2007	Scotland		
Coaching career
- Years: Team
- 2003–2008: Penicuik
- 2008–2011: Murrayfield Wanderers
- 2011–2013: Edinburgh Accies
- 2012–2013: Scotland U20s
- 2013–2022: Worcester Warriors
- 2023–: Old Glory DC
- Correct as of 7 July 2023

Simon Terriss Cross (born 3 February 1981) is a Scottish rugby union coach and former player, currently head coach at Old Glory DC. He played in the back row as a flanker for Edinburgh Rugby.

== Club career ==
Cross was educated at Sedbergh School. He joined Edinburgh Rugby in 2003 after starting his professional career with London Wasps. He captained the Wasps under-21 side for three years, the culmination of which was beating Bristol in the U21 Final at Twickenham in 2003.

During the 2006–07 season, Cross was loaned by Edinburgh to English National Division One club Waterloo for one month.

Cross was appointed club captain at the start of the 2007–08 season alongside Ally Hogg as first-team captain. Cross retained the club captaincy for the 2008–09 season, with Mike Blair as first team captain.

In April 2008, Cross signed a new two-year contract with Edinburgh.

As part of the draft of all players from the Scottish professional teams (Edinburgh and Glasgow Warriors) to the Scottish Premier One rugby clubs, Cross was selected by Selkirk and was available to play for them during the 2008–09 season when not required by Edinburgh or any of the national teams.

Cross retired from professional rugby at the end of the 2009/2010 season due to persistent knee problems.

== International career ==
Cross represented Scotland Under-19 in the 2000 IRB/FIRA Junior World Cup.

In 2002, Cross turned down the opportunity to play with the England Under-21 team and in 2003 joined the Scottish national training squad pending a ruling from the IRB on his qualification to play for Scotland.

Cross, who has always considered himself to be Scottish, was born in Mauritius whilst his father served there in the British Army. His mother, Fiona, was born in Germany while her father also served in the British Army. His father, Peter, is English. Cross's maternal grandfather and great-grandfather were born in military hospitals, both in India. His great-great-grandfather was born in Scotland.

On 21 January 2004, the IRB Regulations Committee ruled that he was free to play for Scotland having demonstrated a "close, credible and established national link with the country" and accepted that "certain rights flow from birth in a British military hospital". The committee's statement went on to say that "if the player, his mother and/or grandfather had not been on military service and therefore born in British military hospitals, the strong likelihood is that given the historical circumstances and family lineage at least one of them would have been born in Scotland. The committee also took the view that close links to Scotland were further demonstrated by the fact that the player, who was eligible to play for other unions, refrained from representing such other unions. In particular he turned down opportunities to play with the England national representative under 21s team in 2002."

Despite having been selected for national training squads by both the current Scotland coach, Frank Hadden, and his predecessor, Matt Williams, and even being named among the replacements, Cross never received a full international cap.

In 2007, Cross represented Scotland during the final four rounds of the 2006–07 IRB Sevens World Series in Hong Kong, Adelaide, London and the inaugural Edinburgh Sevens at Murrayfield.

== Coaching ==
In addition to his playing duties for Edinburgh, Cross was the first team coach for Murrayfield Wanderers for the 2008–09 season. He was then appointed first team coach of Edinburgh Accies for 3 seasons, 2010–2012, where he appointed his Edinburgh team-mate, Andrew Easson as backs coach.

Cross previously coached Penicuik for five years.

Cross worked as Worcester Warriors as defence coach from 2013

In May 2017 Cross was appointed head coach at Birmingham Moseley whilst maintaining a role as specialist break-down coach at Worcester

On July 7, 2023, Cross was announced as the head coach at Old Glory DC in the USA Major League Rugby
