= 2007 Edinburgh Sevens =

Rugby sevens tournament

The Edinburgh Sevens is played annually as part of the IRB Sevens World Series for international rugby sevens (seven a side version of rugby union). The 2007 competition took place on 2 and 3 June, and was held at Murrayfield. It was the last leg of the 2006–07 IRB Sevens World Series.

New Zealand won the tournament after defeating Samoa, 34–5, in the final. Fiji were upset by Wales, 21–14, in their quarter-final. A Fijian victory would have guaranteed them the overall 2006–07 Series crown, however, as a result of their loss and New Zealand's tournament victory, New Zealand won the overall series.

== Pool Stages ==
=== Pool A ===
Team	Pld	W	D	L	F	A	TOTAL
Fiji	3	3	0	0	91	12	9
Kenya	3	2	0	1	39	50	7
Australia	3	1	0	2	45	51	5
Portugal	3	0	0	3	17	79	3

Results
- Fiji 31–0 Kenya
- Australia 26–5 Portugal
- Fiji 31–5 Portugal
- Australia 12–17 Kenya
- Kenya 22–7 Portugal
- Fiji 29–7 Australia

=== Pool B ===
Team	Pld	W	D	L	F	A	TOTAL
Samoa	3	3	0	0	83	26	9
Wales	3	2	0	1	85	33	7
Italy	3	1	0	2	19	79	5
France	3	0	0	3	24	73	3

Results
- Samoa 21–14 Wales
- France 0–19 Italy
- Samoa 36–0 Italy
- France 12–28 Wales
- Wales 43–0 Italy
- Samoa 26–12 France

=== Pool C ===
Team	Pld	W	D	L	F	A	TOTAL
Scotland	3	3	0	0	74	27	9
South Africa	3	2	0	1	94	41	7
Russia	3	1	0	2	24	81	5
Canada	3	0	0	3	34	77	3

Results
- South Africa 27–17 Canada
- Scotland 19–5 Russia
- South Africa 50–0 Russia
- Scotland 31–5 Canada
- Canada 12–19 Russia
- South Africa 17–24 Scotland

=== Pool D ===
Team	Pld	W	D	L	F	A	TOTAL
New Zealand	3	3	0	0	114	14	9
Argentina	3	2	0	1	57	52	7
England	3	1	0	2	38	57	5
Georgia	3	0	0	3	12	98	3

Results
- New Zealand 33–7 Argentina
- England 24–0 Georgia
- New Zealand 43–7 Georgia
- England 14–19 Argentina
- Argentina 31–5 Georgia
- New Zealand 38–0 England

== Finals ==
- 1/4 Final Bowl Australia 19–7 France
- 1/4 Final Bowl England 29–7 Canada
- 1/4 Final Bowl Russia 7–19 Georgia
- 1/4 Final Bowl Italy 12–19 Portugal
- 1/4 Final Cup Fiji 14–21 Wales
- 1/4 Final Cup New Zealand 19–12 South Africa
- 1/4 Final Cup Scotland 10–22 Argentina
- 1/4 Final Cup Samoa 14–12 Kenya
- SF Shield France 33–17 Canada
- SF Shield Russia 19–17 Italy
- SF Bowl Australia 19–24 England
- SF Bowl Georgia 12–19 Portugal
- SF Plate Fiji 19–14 South Africa
- SF Plate Scotland 17–19 Kenya
- SF Cup Wales 0–28 New Zealand
- SF Cup Argentina 14–24 Samoa
- Final Shield France 21–12 Russia
- Final Bowl England 31–0 Portugal
- Final Plate Fiji 31–7 Kenya
- Final Cup New Zealand 34–5 Samoa

== Final standings ==
The points awarded to each team after all 8 rounds of the 2006–07 season, as well as their overall points totals, are shown in the table below.

2006–07 IRB Sevens – Series VIII
Pos.	Event Team	Dubai	George	Wellington	San Diego	Hong Kong	Adelaide	London	Edinburgh	Points total
1	New Zealand	16	20	12	12	18	12	20	20	130
2	Fiji	12	12	16	20	24	20	16	8	128
3	Samoa	8	4	20	16	30	16	12	16	126
4	South Africa	20	16	12	8	18	6	8	4	92
5	England	12	12	8	4	8	4	2	2	52
6	Wales	0	8	–	–	4	2	12	12	38
7	Australia	4	2	0	4	8	8	6	0	30
8	France	6	4	6	12	0	0	0	0	28
9	Scotland	0	0	0	6	8	4	4	4	26
10	Argentina	2	0	2	0	3	0	4	12	23
11	Kenya	0	0	4	0	0	12	0	6	22
12	Tonga	–	–	0	2	8	0	–	–	10
13	Canada	4	0	4	0	0	0	0	0	8
14	Tunisia	0	6	–	–	0	–	–	–	6
15*	Portugal	0	0	0	0	2	0	0	0	2
15*	United States	–	–	0	0	2	–	–	–	2
17	Russia	–	–	–	–	1	–	0	0	1
—N/a	Italy	–	–	–	–	0	–	0	0	0
—N/a	Zimbabwe	0	0	–	–	–	–	–	–	0
—N/a	Cook Islands	–	–	0	–	0	–	–	–	0
—N/a	Hong Kong	–	–	–	–	0	0	–	–	0
—N/a	Japan	–	–	–	–	0	0	–	–	0
—N/a	Georgia	–	–	–	–	–	–	0	0	0
—N/a	Arabian Gulf	0	–	–	–	–	–	–	–	0
—N/a	Uganda	–	0	–	–	–	–	–	–	0
—N/a	Papua New Guinea	–	–	0	–	–	–	–	–	0
—N/a	Chile	–	–	–	0	–	–	–	–	0
—N/a	West Indies	–	–	–	0	–	–	–	–	0
—N/a	China	–	–	–	–	0	–	–	–	0
—N/a	South Korea	–	–	–	–	0	–	–	–	0
—N/a	Sri Lanka	–	–	–	–	0	–	–	–	0

Sources: rugby7.com (archived), irb.com (archived), world.rugby (archived)

Legend
Gold	Event Champions
Silver	Event Runner-ups
Light blue line on the left indicates a core team eligible to participate in all events of the series.

Notes:

1. Gold indicates the event champions. Silver indicates the event runner-ups. A zero (0) is recorded in the event column where a team played in a tournament but did not gain any points. A dash (–) is recorded in the event column if a team did not compete at a tournament.
2. Teams that share a position in the standings (on the same total series points) are marked with an asterisk (*) beside their position.
3. Any teams that did not score any points in the overall series are marked with N/A in the position column. They are sorted by most number of events played, earliest date of events played, then alphabetically by team name.
