= Australian Sevens =

International rugby sevens tournament

- Most recent season or competition: 2025 Australia Sevens
- Sport: Rugby sevens
- First season: 1986; 40 years ago
- Country: Australia
- Venue: Perth Rectangular Stadium
- Most recent champion: Argentina (2025)
- Most titles: Fiji (6 titles)

The Australia Sevens is an international rugby sevens tournament that was first played in 1986. Currently hosted as the Perth Sevens, the event is part of the World Rugby Sevens Series. The tournament was held in Brisbane, in Adelaide, in Gold Coast and in Sydney in previous seasons.

== History ==
The NSW Rugby Union hosted an international sevens tournament at Concord Oval in Sydney from 1986 to 1988, as part of Australia's Bicentennial celebrations. The Australian Rugby Football Union, later the Australian Rugby Union (ARU) and now known as Rugby Australia, continued the event for a further year in 1989.

The 2000 Brisbane Sevens was the first Australian Sevens tournament in the World Sevens Series run by the International Rugby Board (IRB), now known as World Rugby. It was the 7th tournament of the series in the inaugural 1999-2000 season and was hosted at Lang Park. Fiji played Australia in the final, and won the match in the dying seconds, thanks to a brilliant try to Waisale Serevi. Brisbane's hosting rights for 2001 were withdrawn by the IRB because of the Australian Federal Government's sporting boycott of Fiji, imposed after the 2000 Fijian coup d'état. After sanctions were lifted later in 2001, the remaining two tournaments of Brisbane's four-year hosting agreement were played and won by Australia and England in 2002 and 2003 respectively. Australia was not awarded a World Sevens tournament for the next three years.

Adelaide secured the hosting rights for the 2006/07 season. The 2007 Adelaide Sevens took place in April of that year, replacing the Singapore Sevens in the calendar. The tournament was hosted at Adelaide Oval for five seasons, with the last edition of the Adelaide Sevens being held in 2011.

Logo of the Gold Coast 7s

In April 2011, the ARU announced that the Australian leg of the Sevens World Series would be played at Skilled Park on the Gold Coast for at least the next four years. The tournament was scheduled for the early part of the 2011/12 season, which meant that two World Sevens events were played in Australia in 2011. The Gold Coast tournament was initially named the "International Rugby Sevens Gold Coast", but was later rebranded as the Gold Coast Sevens.

The Gold Coast attendances for the 2013 and 2014 events were lower than expected, and in March 2015 the ARU announced that Sydney would host the event for the next four years from the 2015–16 season.

With the closure and rebuilding of Sydney Football Stadium, both men's and women's events for the Sydney Sevens tournament were moved to Sydney Showground Stadium in 2019, and Western Sydney Stadium for 2020.

== Results ==
=== Invitational tournament ===
Year	Venue	Final			Placings			
	Sydney	Winner	Score	Runner-up	Plate	Bowl	Shield	Ref
1986	Concord Oval	New Zealand	32–0	Australia	Argentina	Wales	—N/a	
1987	Concord Oval	Australia	22–10	New Zealand	South Korea	Fiji	Western Samoa	
1988	Concord Oval	New Zealand	22–12	Scotland	Fiji	Australia	Spain	
1989	Concord Oval	New Zealand	26–16	Western Samoa	Australia	Fiji	—N/a	

=== World Rugby Sevens Series ===
Year	Venue	Final			Placings		
	Brisbane	Winner	Score	Runner-up	Plate	Bowl	Shield
2000	Lang Park	Fiji	24–21	Australia	Argentina	Tonga	—N/a
2001	Cancelled by IRB due to Australian Government sanctions against Fiji.						
2002	Ballymore	Australia	28–0	New Zealand	Fiji	Cook Islands	Canada
2003	Ballymore	England	28–14	Fiji	Australia	Tonga	Cook Islands
	Adelaide	Winner	Score	Runner-up	Plate	Bowl	Shield
2007	Adelaide Oval	Fiji	21–7	Samoa	Australia	Wales	Canada
2008	Adelaide Oval	South Africa	15–7	New Zealand	Tonga	Argentina	Wales
2009	Adelaide Oval	South Africa	26–7	Kenya	England	Samoa	United States
2010	Adelaide Oval	Samoa	38–10	United States	New Zealand	England	Japan
2011	Adelaide Oval	New Zealand	28–20	South Africa	Wales	United States	Japan
	Gold Coast	Winner	Score	Runner-up	Plate	Bowl	Shield
2011–12	Robina Stadium	Fiji	26–12	New Zealand	Wales	Argentina	Papua New Guinea
2012–13	Robina Stadium	Fiji	32–14	New Zealand	Argentina	Spain	Scotland
2013–14	Robina Stadium	New Zealand	40–19	Australia	Fiji	France	United States
2014–15	Robina Stadium	Fiji	31–24	Samoa	New Zealand	France	Canada
	Sydney	Winner	Score	Runner-up	Third	Fourth	Fifth
2016	Sydney Football Stadium	New Zealand	27–24	Australia	Fiji	South Africa	Argentina
2017	Sydney Football Stadium	South Africa	29–14	England	New Zealand	Australia	Fiji
2018	Sydney Football Stadium	Australia	29–0	South Africa	Argentina	United States	New Zealand
2019	Sydney Showground	New Zealand	21–5	United States	England	Fiji	South Africa
2020	Bankwest Stadium	Fiji	12–10	South Africa	United States	England	New Zealand
World Series tournaments planned for Sydney were cancelled in 2021 and 2022, due to COVID-19.
2023	Sydney Football Stadium	New Zealand	38–0	South Africa	Fiji	France	Samoa
	Perth	Winner	Score	Runner-up	Third	Fourth	Fifth
2024	Perth Rectangular Stadium	Argentina	31–5	Australia	Ireland	Fiji	South Africa
2025	Perth Rectangular Stadium	Argentina	41–5	Australia	Spain	South Africa	Fiji
2026	Perth Rectangular Stadium	South Africa	21–19	Fiji	Australia	New Zealand	Argentina

== Team records ==
Summary of results in the Australian leg of the World Rugby Sevens Series:

Team	Winner	Runner-up	Third	Fourth
Fiji	6 ('00, '07, '11, (Note: There were two Australian events played in 2011 (and none in 2015) due to the Gold Coast Sevens being hosted in November from the 2011–12 season onwards.) '12, '14, '20)	1 ('03)	1 ('23)	2 ('19, '24)
New Zealand	5 ('11, '13, '16, '19, '23)	4 ('02, '08, '11, '12)	1 ('17)	–
South Africa	3 ('08, '09, '17)	4 ('11, '18, '20, '23)	–	1 ('25)
Australia	2 ('02, '18)	5 ('00, '13, '16, '24, '25)	–	1 ('17)
Argentina	2 ('24, '25)	–	1 ('18)	–
Samoa	1 ('10)	2 ('07, '14)	–	–
England	1 ('03)	1 ('17)	1 ('19)	1 ('20)
United States	–	2 ('10, '19)	1 ('20)	1 ('18)
Kenya	–	1 ('09)	–	–
Spain	–	–	1 ('25)	–
Ireland	–	–	1 ('24)	–
France	–	–	–	1 ('23)

Updated to the 2025 tournament

== See also ==
- Australian Women's Sevens
- Rugby union in Australia
