= 2007 Dubai Sevens =

Rugby tournament season

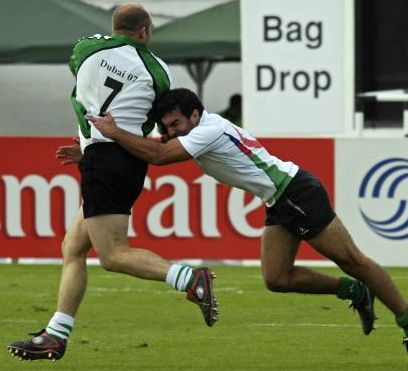
2007 Dubai Sevens

The Dubai Sevens is played annually as part of the IRB Sevens World Series for international rugby sevens (seven-a-side version of rugby union). The 2007 competition, which took place on November 30 and December 1 at the Dubai Exiles Rugby Ground, was the first Cup trophy in the 2007-08 IRB Sevens World Series.

It was the last Dubai Sevens to be held at the Exiles Ground. Starting in 2008, the tournament moved to The Sevens, a new stadium built to host the 2009 Rugby World Cup Sevens.

The defending series champions New Zealand won the Cup trophy (overall title) defeating Fiji. Defending Dubai champions South Africa lost in the Cup semifinals. Other trophy winners, in decreasing order of prestige, were Argentina in the Plate, Australia in the Bowl, and Zimbabwe in the Shield.

== Teams ==
- (Cooperation Council for the Arab States of the Gulf) Arabian Gulf
- Argentina
- Australia
- Canada
- England
- France
- Fiji
- Kenya
- New Zealand
- Samoa
- Scotland
- South Africa
- Tunisia
- United States
- Wales
- Zimbabwe

== Pool stages ==
=== Pool A ===
Team	Pld	W	D	L	PF	PA	+/-	Pts
New Zealand	3	3	0	0	126	24	102	9
Scotland	3	2	0	1	49	58	−9	7
France	3	1	0	2	57	38	19	5
(Cooperation Council for the Arab States of the Gulf) Arabian Gulf	3	0	0	3	5	117	−112	3

Date	Team 1	Score	Team 2
2007-11-30	New Zealand	41 - 5	Scotland
2007-11-30	France	26 - 0	(Cooperation Council for the Arab States of the Gulf) Arabian Gulf
2007-11-30	New Zealand	64 - 0	(Cooperation Council for the Arab States of the Gulf) Arabian Gulf
2007-11-30	France	12 - 17	Scotland
2007-11-30	Scotland	27 - 5	(Cooperation Council for the Arab States of the Gulf) Arabian Gulf
2007-11-30	New Zealand	21 - 19	France

=== Pool B ===
Team	Pld	W	D	L	PF	PA	+/-	Pts
Fiji	3	3	0	0	111	36	75	9
Argentina	3	2	0	1	50	50	0	7
Australia	3	1	0	2	52	86	−34	5
Zimbabwe	3	0	0	3	33	74	−41	3

Date	Team 1	Score	Team 2
2007-11-30	Fiji	31 - 19	Argentina
2007-11-30	Australia	28 - 21	Zimbabwe
2007-11-30	Fiji	34 - 5	Zimbabwe
2007-11-30	Australia	12 - 19	Argentina
2007-11-30	Argentina	12 - 7	Zimbabwe
2007-11-30	Fiji	46 - 12	Australia

=== Pool C ===
Team	Pld	W	D	L	PF	PA	+/-	Pts
Samoa	3	3	0	0	72	33	39	9
Kenya	3	2	0	1	45	43	2	7
Wales	3	1	0	2	48	40	8	5
United States	3	0	0	3	14	63	−49	3

Date	Team 1	Score	Team 2
2007-11-30	Samoa	24 - 19	Kenya
2007-11-30	Wales	22 - 7	United States
2007-11-30	Samoa	29 - 0	United States
2007-11-30	Wales	12 - 14	Kenya
2007-11-30	Kenya	12 - 7	United States
2007-11-30	Samoa	19 - 14	Wales

=== Pool D ===
Team	Pld	W	D	L	PF	PA	+/-	Pts
South Africa	3	3	0	0	95	15	80	9
England	3	1	1	1	61	58	3	6
Canada	3	1	1	1	53	74	−21	6
Tunisia	3	0	0	3	31	93	−62	3

Date	Team 1	Score	Team 2
2007-11-30	South Africa	31 - 5	Canada
2007-11-30	England	27 - 12	Tunisia
2007-11-30	South Africa	42 - 0	Tunisia
2007-11-30	England	24 - 24	Canada
2007-11-30	Canada	24 - 19	Tunisia
2007-11-30	South Africa	22 - 10	England

== Knockout ==
=== Shield ===
Quarter-finals
December 1 - Dubai Exiles Rugby Ground, Dubai
France	24
Zimbabwe	19
December 1 - Dubai Exiles Rugby Ground, Dubai
Canada	21
United States	12
December 1 - Dubai Exiles Rugby Ground, Dubai
Wales	17
Tunisia	12
December 1 - Dubai Exiles Rugby Ground, Dubai
Australia	36
(Cooperation Council for the Arab States of the Gulf) Arabian Gulf	5

Semi-finals
December 1 - Dubai Exiles Rugby Ground, Dubai
Zimbabwe	29
United States	17
December 1 - Dubai Exiles Rugby Ground, Dubai
Tunisia	36
(Cooperation Council for the Arab States of the Gulf) Arabian Gulf	0

Final
December 1 - Dubai Exiles Rugby Ground, Dubai
Zimbabwe	22
Tunisia	19

=== Bowl ===
Quarter-finals
December 1 - Dubai Exiles Rugby Ground, Dubai
France	24
Zimbabwe	19
December 1 - Dubai Exiles Rugby Ground, Dubai
Canada	21
United States	12
December 1 - Dubai Exiles Rugby Ground, Dubai
Wales	17
Tunisia	12
December 1 - Dubai Exiles Rugby Ground, Dubai
Australia	36
Arabian Gulf	5

Semi-finals
December 1 - Dubai Exiles Rugby Ground, Dubai
France	5
Canada	21
December 1 - Dubai Exiles Rugby Ground, Dubai
Wales	19
Australia	22

Final
December 1 - Dubai Exiles Rugby Ground, Dubai
Canada	0
Australia	31

=== Plate ===
Quarter-finals
December 1 - Dubai Exiles Rugby Ground, Dubai
New Zealand	40
Argentina	7
December 1 - Dubai Exiles Rugby Ground, Dubai
South Africa	17
Kenya	15
December 1 - Dubai Exiles Rugby Ground, Dubai
Samoa	19
England	26
December 1 - Dubai Exiles Rugby Ground, Dubai
Fiji	28
Scotland	5

Semi-finals
December 1 - Dubai Exiles Rugby Ground, Dubai
Argentina	17
Kenya	14
December 1 - Dubai Exiles Rugby Ground, Dubai
Samoa	28
Scotland	19

Final
December 1 - Dubai Exiles Rugby Ground, Dubai
Argentina	15
Samoa	14

=== Cup ===
Quarter-finals
December 1 - Dubai Exiles Rugby Ground, Dubai
New Zealand	40
Argentina	7
December 1 - Dubai Exiles Rugby Ground, Dubai
South Africa	17
Kenya	15
December 1 - Dubai Exiles Rugby Ground, Dubai
Samoa	19
England	26
December 1 - Dubai Exiles Rugby Ground, Dubai
Fiji	28
Scotland	5

Semi-finals
December 1 - Dubai Exiles Rugby Ground, Dubai
New Zealand	12
South Africa	7
December 1 - Dubai Exiles Rugby Ground, Dubai
England	21
Fiji	22

Final
December 1 - Dubai Exiles Rugby Ground, Dubai
New Zealand	31
Fiji	21

== Round 1 table ==
Pos.	Country	(Emirate of Dubai)	(South Africa)	(New Zealand)	(United States)	(Hong Kong)	(Australia)	(England)	(Scotland)	Overall
1	New Zealand	20								20
2	Fiji	16								16
3	England	12								12
3	South Africa	12								12
5	Argentina	8								8
6	Samoa	6								6
7	Kenya	4								4
7	Scotland	4								4
9	Australia	2								2
10	Canada	0								0
10	Wales	0								0
10	France	0								0
10	Zimbabwe	0								0
10	Tunisia	0								0
10	United States	0								0
10	(Cooperation Council for the Arab States of the Gulf) Arabian Gulf	0								0
