= Dubai Sevens =

Annual rugby sevens and social event

- Most recent season or competition: 2025 Dubai Sevens
- Sport: Rugby sevens
- First season: 1970
- No. of teams: 16
- Most recent champion: New Zealand
- Most titles: South Africa (11 titles)

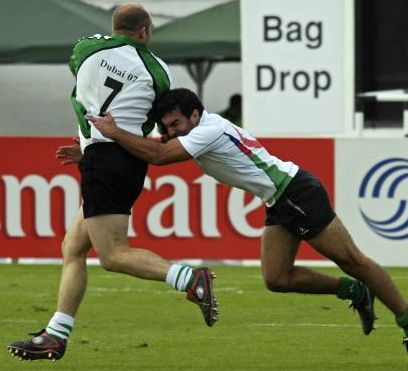
2007 Dubai Sevens

The Dubai 7s is an annual rugby sevens and social event held at The Sevens Stadium in Dubai, UAE. Founded in 1970, the event is the longest running sports event in the Middle East.

== Events ==
The Dubai 7s has six competitions each year:

- World Rugby Sevens Series
- World Rugby Women's Sevens Series
- Rugby Invitation Tournament
- Netball Invitation Tournament
- Cricket 7s Invitational Tournament
- WODON3, Fitness at the Emirates Dubai 7s

Dubai is the first leg of the World Rugby Sevens Series. Sixteen teams compete in the men's tournament divided into four pool of four teams each. On the first day, each team plays the other three teams in the pool. The two highest-placed teams in each pool advance to the quarterfinal knockout rounds, and the bottom two teams move to the challenge bracket.

Dubai also hosts a stop on the World Rugby Women's Sevens Series. Twelve teams compete in the women's tournament.

For the invitation tournaments, rugby teams take part in 15 sections. The rugby invitational tournament is popular, with hundreds of teams participating. The netball tournament includes teams in three sections: gulf women, open youth, and open women.

The Dubai Sevens is one of the more popular sporting events in Dubai, with over 100,000 fans attending the 2016 event.

== Venue ==
The Dubai 7s has been held at The Sevens Stadium since 2008. Facilities at The Sevens include: eight rugby pitches, six cricket pitches, four netball/tennis courts, one basketball court, a grandstand, and ancillary facilities.

The tournament's move to that venue in 2008 was a success. The tournament broke the World Series single-day attendance record in its first year with over 50,000 fans appearing on the first day of the tournament.

== World Series results ==
=== Results ===
Five teams have won the Dubai Sevens at least once. The early years of the tournament on the World Series were less competitive. Prior to 2003, New Zealand won the final with a comfortable 20+ point margin each year. In the first decade from 1999 to 2008 only five teams (New Zealand, Fiji, Samoa, South Africa, and England) had reached the Dubai Sevens final. Since then, the tournament has been more competitive, with several additional teams making the final and semifinal stages.

Summary of Dubai Sevens results on the World Series (updated to 2022):

| Team | Champion | Runner-up | Semifinalist | Top 4 placing |
|---|---|---|---|---|
| South Africa | 11 | 1 | 5 | 17 |
| New Zealand | 6 | 5 | 9 | 20 |
| England | 4 | 2 | 9 | 15 |
| Fiji | 3 | 6 | 9 | 18 |
| Samoa | 1 | 3 | 5 | 9 |
| Australia | – | 2 | 3 | 5 |
| United States | – | 2 | 2 | 4 |
| France | – | 1 | 2 | 3 |
| Ireland | – | 1 | – | 1 |
| Argentina | – | 1 | 4 | 5 |
| Spain | – | 1 | – | 1 |
| Kenya | – | – | 1 | 1 |
| Wales | – | – | 1 | 1 |
| Total | 24 | 24 | 48 | 96 |

=== Results by year ===
| Year | Venue | Cup final | | | Placings | | | Refs |
|---|---|---|---|---|---|---|---|---|
| | | Winner | Score | Runner-up | Plate | Bowl | Shield | |
| 1999 | Dubai Exiles | New Zealand | 38–14 | Fiji | Australia | Scotland | —N/a | |
| 2000 | Dubai Exiles | New Zealand | 34–5 | Fiji | South Africa | Ireland | —N/a | |
| 2001^{^{a}} | Dubai Exiles | New Zealand | 45–7 | South Africa | Scotland | Wales | —N/a | |
| 2002 | Dubai Exiles | New Zealand | 38–12 | Samoa | Fiji | France | Namibia | |
| 2003 | Dubai Exiles | South Africa | 33–26 | New Zealand | Argentina | Canada | Zambia | |
| 2004 | Dubai Exiles | England | 26–21 | Fiji | Samoa | Portugal | Tunisia | |
| 2005 | Dubai Exiles | England | 28–26 | Fiji | New Zealand | Wales | Kenya | |
| 2006 | Dubai Exiles | South Africa | 31–12 | New Zealand | Samoa | Argentina | Wales | |
| 2007 | Dubai Exiles | New Zealand | 31–21 | Fiji | Argentina | Australia | Zimbabwe | |
| 2008 | The Sevens | South Africa | 19–12 | England | Samoa | Portugal | United States | |
| 2009 | The Sevens | New Zealand | 24–12 | Samoa | Australia | Wales | Russia | |
| 2010 | The Sevens | England | 29–21 | Samoa | South Africa | Argentina | Kenya | |
| 2011 | The Sevens | England | 29–12 | France | Fiji | Australia | Scotland | |
| 2012 | The Sevens | Samoa | 26–15 | New Zealand | Wales | Argentina | England | |
| 2013 | The Sevens | Fiji | 29–17 | South Africa | Argentina | Australia | France | |
| 2014 | The Sevens | South Africa | 33–7 | Australia | Argentina | Samoa | Canada | |
| 2015 | The Sevens | Fiji | 28–17 | England | South Africa | France | Canada | |
| | | Winner | Score | Runner-up | Third | Fourth | Fifth | |
| 2016 | The Sevens | South Africa | 26–14 | Fiji | England | Wales | Australia | |
| 2017 | The Sevens | South Africa | 24–12 | New Zealand | England | Fiji | Australia | |
| 2018 | The Sevens | New Zealand | 21–5 | United States | England | Australia | Fiji | |
| 2019 | The Sevens | South Africa | 15–0 | New Zealand | England | Samoa | Australia | |
| 2020 | The Sevens | Tournament cancelled due to impacts of the COVID-19 pandemic. | | | | | | |
| 2021; I | The Sevens | South Africa | 42–7 | United States | Argentina | Fiji | Australia | |
| 2021; II | The Sevens | South Africa | 10–7 | Australia | Argentina | France | Great Britain | |
| 2022 | The Sevens | South Africa | 21–5 | Ireland | New Zealand | United States | France | |
| 2023 | The Sevens | South Africa | 12–7 | Argentina | New Zealand | Fiji | Ireland | |
| 2024 | The Sevens | Fiji | 19–5 | Spain | Argentina | New Zealand | France | |
| 2025 | The Sevens | New Zealand | 26–22 | Australia | Fiji | France | South Africa | |

Notes:

^^{a} The event held on November 7–8, 2001, was downgraded in status and excluded from the Sevens World Series after several teams withdrew in the wake of the September 11, 2001 attacks.

== Earlier winners ==
Winners of the Emirates International Trophy from 1988 to 1998:

- 1988 The Thistles
- 1989 Crawshays
- 1990 Toulouse
- 1991 Queensland
- 1992 Scotland
- 1993 White Hart Marauders
- 1994 South Korea
- 1995 Kiwi Nomads
- 1996 Fiji
- 1997 New Zealand Invitation
- 1998 Fiji

== See also ==
- Dubai Women's Sevens
