= 2003 Brisbane Sevens =

International rugby tournament

- IRB Sevens IV
- Host nation: Australia
- Date: 2–3 January 2003

Cup
- Champion: England
- Runner-up: Fiji

Plate
- Winner: Australia
- Runner-up: Samoa

Bowl
- Winner: Tonga
- Runner-up: United States

Shield
- Winner: Cook Islands
- Runner-up: Papua New Guinea

Tournament details
- Matches played: 44

The 2003 Brisbane Sevens, officially called the 2003 Brisbane International Sevens, was an international rugby sevens tournament that was part of the World Sevens Series in the 2002–03 season. It was the Australian Sevens leg of the series, held at Ballymore Stadium in Brisbane over the weekend of 2 and 3 January 2003.

The competition was won by England who defeated Fiji 28–14 in the Cup final.

The tournament was the third completed edition of the Australian Sevens. For the next three years there was no World Sevens tournament staged in Australia, until the event returned as the 2007 Adelaide Sevens.

== Format ==
The teams were drawn into four pools of four teams each. Each team played the other teams in their pool once, with 3 points awarded for a win, 2 points for a draw, and 1 point for a loss (no points awarded for a forfeit). The top two teams from each pool advanced to the Cup/Plate brackets. The bottom two teams from each group went on to the Bowl/Shield brackets.

== Teams ==
The participating teams were:

- Argentina
- Australia
- Canada
- China
- Cook Islands
- England
- Fiji
- France
- Japan
- New Zealand
- Niue
- Papua New Guinea
- Samoa
- South Africa
- Tonga
- United States

== Pool Stage ==
Play on the first day of the tournament consisted of matches between teams in the same pool on a round robin basis. The following is a list of the recorded results.

=== Pool A ===
Team	Pld	W	D	L	PF	PA	PD	Pts	Qualification
New Zealand	3	3	0	0	137	0	+137	9	Cup Quarterfinal
France	3	2	0	1	64	45	+19	7	Cup Quarterfinal
United States	3	1	0	2	50	64	−14	5	
China	3	0	0	3	0	142	−142	3	

2 January 2003

New Zealand	33–0	France

Ballymore Stadium

2 January 2003

United States	38–0	China

Ballymore Stadium

2 January 2003

France	21–12	United States

Ballymore Stadium

2 January 2003

New Zealand	61–0	China

Ballymore Stadium

2 January 2003

France	43–0	China

Ballymore Stadium

2 January 2003

New Zealand	43–0	United States

Ballymore Stadium

=== Pool B ===
Team	Pld	W	D	L	PF	PA	PD	Pts	Qualification
Argentina	3	3	0	0	81	40	+41	9	Cup Quarterfinal
South Africa	3	2	0	1	91	40	+51	7	Cup Quarterfinal
Canada	3	1	0	2	38	50	−12	5	
Papua New Guinea	3	0	0	3	19	99	−80	3	

2 January 2003

Argentina	26–21	South Africa

Ballymore Stadium

2 January 2003

Canada	17–7	Papua New Guinea

Ballymore Stadium

2 January 2003

Argentina	22–7	Canada

Ballymore Stadium

2 January 2003

South Africa	49–0	Papua New Guinea

Ballymore Stadium

2 January 2003

Argentina	33–12	Papua New Guinea

Ballymore Stadium

2 January 2003

South Africa	21–14	Canada

Ballymore Stadium

=== Pool C ===
Team	Pld	W	D	L	PF	PA	PD	Pts	Qualification
Australia	3	3	0	0	103	7	+96	9	Cup Quarterfinal
Samoa	3	2	0	1	50	50	0	7	Cup Quarterfinal
Tonga	3	1	0	2	34	75	−41	5	
Niue	3	0	0	3	15	70	−55	3	

2 January 2003

Australia	35–7	Samoa

Ballymore Stadium

2 January 2003

Tonga	19–15	Niue

Ballymore Stadium

2 January 2003

Samoa	19–15	Tonga

Ballymore Stadium

2 January 2003

Australia	27–0	Niue

Ballymore Stadium

2 January 2003

Samoa	24–0	Niue

Ballymore Stadium

2 January 2003

Australia	41–0	Tonga

Ballymore Stadium

=== Pool D ===
Team	Pld	W	D	L	PF	PA	PD	Pts	Qualification
England	3	3	0	0	64	31	+33	9	Cup Quarterfinal
Fiji	3	2	0	1	60	40	+20	7	Cup Quarterfinal
Japan	3	1	0	2	64	65	−1	5	
Cook Islands	3	0	0	3	19	71	−52	3	

2 January 2003

England	21–12	Fiji

Ballymore Stadium

2 January 2003

Japan	33–12	Cook Islands

Ballymore Stadium

2 January 2003

England	22–19	Japan

Ballymore Stadium

2 January 2003

Fiji	17–7	Cook Islands

Ballymore Stadium

2 January 2003

England	21–0	Cook Islands

Ballymore Stadium

2 January 2003

Fiji	31–12	Japan

Ballymore Stadium

== Knockout stage ==
Play on the second day of the tournament consisted of finals matches for the Shield, Bowl, Plate, and Cup competitions. The following is a list of the recorded results.

=== Shield ===
Semi-finals
18 February – Ballymore Stadium
China	0
Cook Islands	42
18 February – Ballymore Stadium
Japan	19
Papua New Guinea	38

Final
18 February – Ballymore Stadium
Cook Islands	29
Papua New Guinea	14

=== Bowl ===
Quarter-finals
18 February – Ballymore Stadium
Canada	31
China	0
18 February – Ballymore Stadium
Tonga	27
Cook Islands	7
18 February – Ballymore Stadium
Japan	7
Niue	31
18 February – Ballymore Stadium
United States	40
Papua New Guinea	7

Semi-finals
18 February – Ballymore Stadium
Canada	24
Tonga	29
18 February – Ballymore Stadium
Niue	12
United States	17

Final
18 February – Ballymore Stadium
Tonga	29
United States	10

=== Plate ===
Semi-finals
18 February – Ballymore Stadium
Australia	22
Argentina	5
18 February – Ballymore Stadium
Samoa	21
South Africa	10

Final
18 February – Ballymore Stadium
Australia	47
Samoa	12

=== Cup ===
Quarter-finals
18 February – Ballymore Stadium
Argentina	14
France	17
18 February – Ballymore Stadium
Australia	7
Fiji	12
18 February – Ballymore Stadium
England	27
Samoa	5
18 February – Ballymore Stadium
New Zealand	19
South Africa	10

Semi-finals
18 February – Ballymore Stadium
France	19
Fiji	26
18 February – Ballymore Stadium
England	19
New Zealand	14

Final
18 February – Ballymore Stadium
England	28
Fiji	14
