= Richie Pugh =

Welsh rugby player (born 1983)

- Born: Richard Pugh; 10 August 1983 (age 43) Swansea, Wales
- Height: 1.80 m (5 ft 11 in)
- Weight: 97 kg (15 st 4 lb; 214 lb)

Rugby union career
- Position: Flanker
Senior career
Years	Team	Apps	(Points)
- Swansea
- Cardiff
2007–08	London Welsh		
2008–09	Exeter		
Provincial / State sides
Years	Team	Apps	(Points)
2003–08	Ospreys	78	(35)
2009–13	Scarlets	49	(20)
- Correct as of 22:40, 29 November 2010 (UTC)
International career
Years	Team	Apps	(Points)
- Wales U16
- Wales U19
- Wales U21
2005–	Wales	1	(5)
National sevens team
Years	Team		Comps
	Wales 7's		36
Medal record
Men's rugby sevens
Representing Wales
Rugby World Cup Sevens
Gold medal – first place	2009 Dubai	Team competition

Richie Pugh (born 10 August 1983) is Wales international rugby union player who plays at openside flanker. Pugh was born in Swansea and attended Brynmill primary and Bishop Gore Comprehensive schools before going on to study Sports Science at the University of Wales, Swansea.

Signed as a youth, he played for the Ospreys for five years being part of the 2005 winning Celtic League team and 2007 Magners League team before being released from the regional side in 2008 to join Exeter Chiefs. In May 2009 he joined the Scarlets where he played for 4 seasons alongside the Wales Sevens.

Pugh has played just once for Wales, when he came on as a replacement in their tour match against USA (4 June 2005) which Wales won comfortably by 77–3. Pugh marked his international debut with a try.

Pugh was part of the Welsh team who won the Melrose Cup at the 2009 Rugby World Cup Sevens, having been part of the team for several seasons, and he has also captained the team on several occasions including the 2006 Commonwealth Games in Melbourne, Australia. He was also a member of the team that played in the 2010 Delhi Commonwealth Games.

He was selected in the Wales Sevens squad for 2012–13

He has been appointed assistant coach for the GB women's sevens team in the Rio 2016 Olympics.

Pugh has been appointed as assistant coach to Gareth Williams for the Wales Sevens team in the buildup to the Gold Coast Commonwealth Games and 2018 World Cup.
