= Singapore Sevens =

Annual rugby sevens tournament

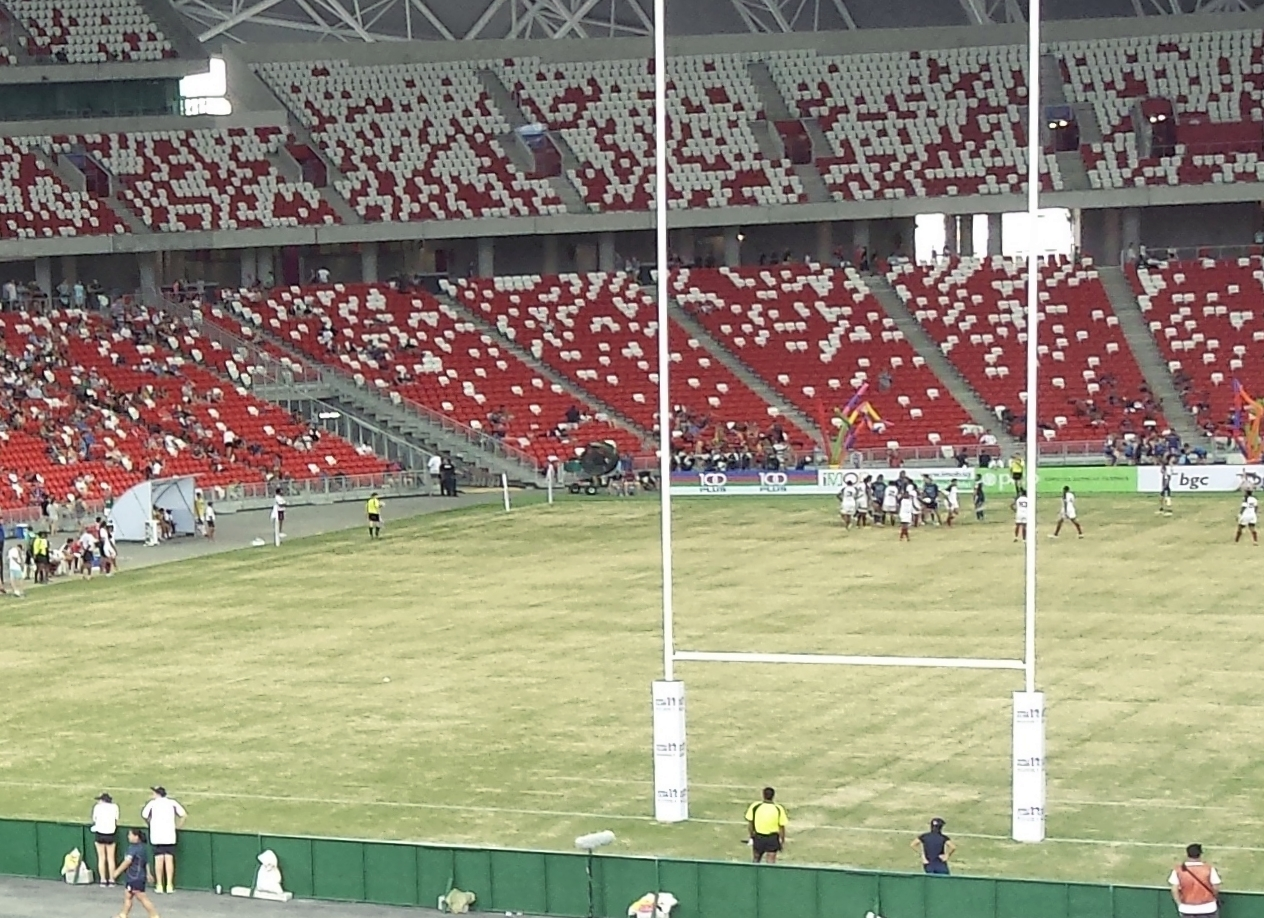
- National Stadium, Singapore 7s venue.
- Sport: Rugby sevens
- Founded: 2002
- No. of teams: 12
- Most recent champions: Men; Fiji (4th title); Women; New Zealand (2nd title)
- Most titles: Men; New Zealand Fiji (4 titles Each); Women; New Zealand (2 titles)

The Singapore Sevens is an annual rugby sevens tournament contested by national teams. It was first hosted as part of the IRB World Sevens Series in 2002. The Standard Chartered Bank was the original title sponsor. It was effectively replaced in the calendar by the Australian Sevens for the 2006-07 season.

The tournament returned as an official event within the Asian Sevens Series in 2013. Singapore then secured a four-year deal to host a leg of the Sevens World Series starting from the 2015–16 season. Singapore's rights to host a leg of the Sevens World Series was extended for a further four years until 2023, before the 2020 event was cancelled due to the COVID-19 pandemic.

The tournament in Singapore was cancelled again in 2021 due to ongoing impacts of the COVID-19 pandemic to protect the health and safety of players, fans, and staff.

Rugby sevens returned in 2022, the ninth time that the Sevens World Series was hosted in Singapore, when Fiji defeated New Zealand to win their third Singapore Sevens title.

In 2024, the Singapore Sevens saw its first women's tournament, with New Zealand taking the title.

== Men's Results ==
By placing

Summary of top-4 placings at the Singapore Sevens on the SVNS (updated to 2024):

Team	Champion	Runner-up	Semifinalist	Top 4 placing
Fiji	4	2	2	7
New Zealand	4	1	-	5
South Africa	2	–	4	6
Canada	1	–	–	1
Kenya	1	–	–	1
England	–	2	4	6
Argentina	–	3	2	5
Australia	–	1	4	5
United States	–	1	1	2
Ireland	–	1	1	2
France	–	–	1	1
Samoa	–	–	2	2
Great Britain	–	–	1	1
Total	11	11	22	44

Results by year

Year	Venue	Cup final			Placings			Ref
		Winner	Score	Runner-up	Semi	finalists	Plate·Bowl·Shield	
2002	National Stadium	New Zealand	21–17	Argentina	England	Australia	Fiji; Wales; South Korea	
Tournament cancelled due to impacts of the SARS outbreak in 2003.
2004	National Stadium	South Africa	24–19	Argentina	Samoa	France	Fiji; Scotland; Hong Kong	
2005	National Stadium	New Zealand	26–5	England	Fiji	South Africa	Australia; France; Chinese Taipei	
2006	National Stadium	Fiji	40–21	England	South Africa	Argentina	Samoa; Kenya; South Korea	
		Winner	Score	Runner-up	Third	Fourth	Plate·Bowl·Shield	
2013	Yio Chu Kang Stadium	Japan	24–19	Hong Kong	China	South Korea	Sri Lanka; Thailand n/a	
2016	National Stadium	Kenya	30–7	Fiji	South Africa	Argentina	Samoa; Scotland; Russia	
		Winner	Score	Runner-up	Third	Fourth	Fifth	
2017	National Stadium	Canada	26–19	United States	England	Australia	New Zealand	
2018	National Stadium	Fiji	28–22	Australia	England	South Africa	New Zealand	
2019	National Stadium	South Africa	20–19	Fiji	United States	England	Samoa	
Tournaments planned for Singapore were cancelled in 2020 and 2021, due to impacts of the COVID-19 pandemic.
2022	National Stadium	Fiji	28–17	New Zealand	Australia	Ireland	Argentina	
2023	National Stadium	New Zealand	19–17	Argentina	Fiji	Samoa	Australia	
2024	National Stadium	New Zealand	17–14	Ireland	Great Britain	Australia	Argentina	
2025	National Stadium	Fiji	21–12	Kenya	Argentina	Spain	Great Britain	
2026	National Stadium	Fiji	21–12	France	New Zealand	South Africa	Australia	

Key:
Blue border on the left indicates tournaments in the World Rugby Sevens Series.

== Women's Results ==
By placing

Summary of top-4 placings at the Singapore Sevens on the SVNS (updated to 2024):

Team	Champion	Runner-up	Semifinalist	Top 4 placing
New Zealand	2	–	–	2
Australia	–	2	–	2
France	–	–	1	2
Fiji	–	–	1	1
Canada	-	-	1	1
Total	2	2	2	6

Results by year

Year	Venue	Cup final			Placings			Ref
		Winner	Score	Runner-up	Third	Fourth	Fifth	
2024	National Stadium	New Zealand	31–21	Australia	France	Fiji	Ireland	
2025	National Stadium	New Zealand	31–7	Australia	Canada	France	Japan	
2025	National Stadium	New Zealand	36–7	Australia	Canada	United States	France	

Key:
Blue border on the left indicates tournaments in the World Rugby Sevens Series.
