= 2006 Dubai Sevens =

The Dubai Sevens is played annually as part of the IRB Sevens World Series for international rugby sevens (seven-a-side version of rugby union). The 2006 competition, which took place on December 1 and 2 at the Dubai Exiles ground, was the first Cup trophy in the 2006-07 IRB Sevens World Series circuit.

== Teams ==
- Arabian Gulf
- Argentina
- Australia
- Canada
- England
- Fiji
- France
- Kenya
- New Zealand
- Portugal
- Samoa
- Scotland
- South Africa
- Tunisia
- Wales
- Zimbabwe

== Pool stages ==
=== Pool A ===
| Team | Pld | W | D | L | PF | PA | +/- | Pts |
|---|---|---|---|---|---|---|---|---|
| Fiji | 3 | 2 | 0 | 1 | 95 | 19 | +76 | 7 |
| Australia | 3 | 2 | 0 | 1 | 53 | 33 | +20 | 7 |
| Portugal | 3 | 2 | 0 | 1 | 41 | 46 | -5 | 7 |
| Kenya | 3 | 0 | 0 | 3 | 7 | 98 | -91 | 3 |

| Date | Team 1 | Score | Team 2 |
| 2006-12-01 | Fiji | 45 - 0 | Kenya |
| 2006-12-01 | Australia | 10 - 12 | Portugal |
| 2006-12-01 | Fiji | 36 - 0 | Portugal |
| 2006-12-01 | Australia | 24 - 7 | Kenya |
| 2006-12-01 | Kenya | 0 - 29 | Portugal |
| 2006-12-01 | Fiji | 14 - 19 | Australia |

=== Pool B ===
| Team | Pld | W | D | L | PF | PA | +/- | Pts |
|---|---|---|---|---|---|---|---|---|
| England | 3 | 3 | 0 | 0 | 86 | 10 | +76 | 9 |
| France | 3 | 1 | 0 | 2 | 35 | 52 | -17 | 5 |
| Zimbabwe | 3 | 1 | 0 | 2 | 36 | 55 | -19 | 5 |
| Scotland | 3 | 1 | 0 | 2 | 33 | 76 | -43 | 5 |

| Date | Team 1 | Score | Team 2 |
| 2006-12-01 | England | 38 - 0 | Scotland |
| 2006-12-01 | France | 7 - 19 | Zimbabwe |
| 2006-12-01 | England | 29 - 0 | Zimbabwe |
| 2006-12-01 | France | 21 - 14 | Scotland |
| 2006-12-01 | Scotland | 19 - 17 | Zimbabwe |
| 2006-12-01 | England | 19 - 7 | France |

=== Pool C ===
| Team | Pld | W | D | L | PF | PA | +/- | Pts |
|---|---|---|---|---|---|---|---|---|
| South Africa | 3 | 3 | 0 | 0 | 120 | 24 | +96 | 9 |
| Canada | 3 | 2 | 0 | 1 | 52 | 78 | -26 | 7 |
| Tunisia | 3 | 1 | 0 | 2 | 50 | 64 | -14 | 5 |
| Argentina | 3 | 0 | 0 | 3 | 36 | 92 | -56 | 3 |

| Date | Team 1 | Score | Team 2 |
| 2006-12-01 | South Africa | 47 - 5 | Canada |
| 2006-12-01 | Argentina | 12 - 24 | Tunisia |
| 2006-12-01 | South Africa | 33 - 12 | Tunisia |
| 2006-12-01 | Argentina | 17 - 28 | Canada |
| 2006-12-01 | Canada | 19 - 14 | Tunisia |
| 2006-12-01 | South Africa | 40 - 7 | Argentina |

=== Pool D ===
| Team | Pld | W | D | L | PF | PA | +/- | Pts |
|---|---|---|---|---|---|---|---|---|
| New Zealand | 3 | 2 | 0 | 1 | 92 | 22 | +70 | 7 |
| Samoa | 3 | 2 | 0 | 1 | 78 | 24 | +54 | 7 |
| Wales | 3 | 2 | 0 | 1 | 76 | 45 | +31 | 7 |
| Arabian Gulf | 3 | 0 | 0 | 3 | 0 | 155 | -155 | 3 |

| Date | Team 1 | Score | Team 2 |
| 2006-12-01 | New Zealand | 31 - 12 | Wales |
| 2006-12-01 | Samoa | 54 - 0 | Arabian Gulf |
| 2006-12-01 | New Zealand | 54 - 0 | Arabian Gulf |
| 2006-12-01 | Samoa | 14 - 17 | Wales |
| 2006-12-01 | Wales | 47 - 0 | Arabian Gulf |
| 2006-12-01 | New Zealand | 7 - 10 | Samoa |

== Finals ==
=== Shield ===
Quarter-finals
December 2 - Dubai
Portugal | 33
Scotland | 12
December 2 - Dubai
Wales | 10
Argentina | 24
December 2 - Dubai
Tunisia | 26
Arabian Gulf | 0
December 2 - Dubai
Zimbabwe | 12
Kenya | 0

Semi-finals
December 2 - Dubai
Scotland | 12
Wales | 17
December 2 - Dubai
Arabian Gulf | 10
Kenya | 7

Final
December 2 - Dubai
Wales | 33
Arabian Gulf | 0

=== Bowl ===
Quarter-finals
December 2 - Dubai
Portugal | 33
Scotland | 12
December 2 - Dubai
Wales | 10
Argentina | 24
December 2 - Dubai
Tunisia | 26
Arabian Gulf | 0
December 2 - Dubai
Zimbabwe | 12
Kenya | 0

Semi-finals
December 2 - Dubai
Portugal | 7
Argentina | 10
December 2 - Dubai
Tunisia | 10
Zimbabwe | 17

Final
December 2 - Dubai
Argentina | 26
Zimbabwe | 7

=== Plate ===
Quarter-finals
December 2 - Dubai
Fiji | 46
France | 7
December 2 - Dubai
New Zealand | 31
Canada | 0
December 2 - Dubai
South Africa | 19
Samoa | 10
December 2 - Dubai
England | 21
Australia | 5

Semi-finals
December 2 - Dubai
France | 36
Canada | 0
December 2 - Dubai
Samoa | 12
Australia | 5

Final
December 2 - Dubai
France | 7
Samoa | 26

=== Cup ===
Quarter-finals
December 2 - Dubai
Fiji | 46
France | 7
December 2 - Dubai
New Zealand | 31
Canada | 0
December 2 - Dubai
South Africa | 19
Samoa | 10
December 2 - Dubai
England | 21
Australia | 5

Semi-finals
December 2 - Dubai
Fiji | 12
New Zealand | 17
December 2 - Dubai
South Africa | 19
England | 0

Final
December 2 - Dubai
New Zealand | 12
South Africa | 31

== Round 1 table ==
| Pos. | Country | (Emirate of Dubai) | (South Africa) | (New Zealand) | (United States) | (Hong Kong) | (Australia) | (England) | (Scotland) | Overall |
|---|---|---|---|---|---|---|---|---|---|---|
| 1 | South Africa | 20 | | | | | | | | 20 |
| 2 | New Zealand | 16 | | | | | | | | 16 |
| 3 | Fiji | 12 | | | | | | | | 12 |
| 3 | England | 12 | | | | | | | | 12 |
| 5 | Samoa | 8 | | | | | | | | 8 |
| 6 | France | 6 | | | | | | | | 6 |
| 7 | Australia | 4 | | | | | | | | 4 |
| 7 | Canada | 4 | | | | | | | | 4 |
| 9 | Argentina | 2 | | | | | | | | 2 |
| 10 | Zimbabwe | 0 | | | | | | | | 0 |
| 10 | Portugal | 0 | | | | | | | | 0 |
| 10 | Tunisia | 0 | | | | | | | | 0 |
| 10 | Wales | 0 | | | | | | | | 0 |
| 10 | Arabian Gulf | 0 | | | | | | | | 0 |
| 10 | Kenya | 0 | | | | | | | | 0 |
| 10 | Scotland | 0 | | | | | | | | 0 |
