= 2007 USA Sevens =

- 2006–07 Sevens World Series
- Host nation: United States

Cup
- Champion: Fiji
- Runner-up: Samoa

Plate
- Winner: South Africa

Tournament details
- Matches played: 45

The 2007 USA Sevens was a rugby sevens tournament held on February 10 and February 11, 2007 in the United States at 44,500 capacity Petco Park in San Diego, California. The USA Sevens is part of the IRB Sevens World Series. Although the 2006–07 season is the eighth of the Sevens World Series, this was only the fourth edition of the USA Sevens, which began in 2004 as a part of the 2003-04 series. This was the first time for the event in San Diego with past editions being held at The Home Depot Center in the Los Angeles suburb of Carson.

The overall winners of the event were Fiji.

American referee Dana Teagarden became the first woman ever to referee a senior-level men's international in any version of rugby union when she officiated the France-Chile match. Teagarden was also referee for the Bowl final, making her the first woman to referee a men's competition final in any version of rugby union.

== The Format ==
As with all normal events in the IRB Sevens (with the exception of the Hong Kong Sevens), the participating teams are divided into four pools of four. The group winners and second-placed teams progress to the Cup (places 1-4) and Plate (places 5-8) competition. The third and fourth-placed teams progress to the Bowl (places 9-12) and Shield (places 13-16) competitions. Seeding is determined by finishes in the last six competitions in the IRB Sevens. Wins are three points, draws two, losses one, with no points being awarded for a no-show.

== Festival ==
The event is also noted for the large festival that takes place alongside the event. In 2007, it included a waterslide, a beer garden, food courts, skills area, face painting, cigar tents, concerts and a world class coaches’ symposium. Prizes, big and small, were added attractions. This is intended to be not only a rugby event but a big, fun party. The idea is to lure people into the event for the festival and get them interested in rugby union.

== Tickets ==
The window of opportunity for ticket buyers was open for 60 days. After that time, tickets were sold on a first come, best-available basis. Blocks of tickets of 25 or more during this time were discounted 10%. A special "Festival Pass" entitled holders to unlimited access to the Festival and Tournament for all three days.

Similar to Hong Kong Stadium's south stands, Petco Park hosted a "Fun Zone" in the right field bleachers. Access to this area was granted on the basis of best costumes, country displays of team support, "hot looks", and dancing ability.

== Pool stages ==
=== Pool A ===
| Team | Pld | W | D | L | F | A | TOTAL |
|---|---|---|---|---|---|---|---|
| Fiji | 3 | 3 | 0 | 0 | 131 | 17 | 9 |
| Scotland | 3 | 2 | 0 | 1 | 53 | 74 | 7 |
| Argentina | 3 | 1 | 0 | 2 | 48 | 36 | 5 |
| West Indies | 3 | 0 | 0 | 3 | 12 | 117 | 3 |

Results
- Fiji 57 – 5 Scotland
- Argentina 31 – 0 West Indies
- Fiji 55 – 7 West Indies
- Argentina 12 – 17 Scotland
- Scotland 31 – 5 West Indies
- Fiji 19 – 5 Argentina

=== Pool B ===
| Team | Pld | W | D | L | F | A | TOTAL |
|---|---|---|---|---|---|---|---|
| Samoa | 3 | 3 | 0 | 0 | 72 | 38 | 9 |
| South Africa | 3 | 2 | 0 | 1 | 66 | 21 | 7 |
| Tonga | 3 | 1 | 0 | 2 | 41 | 46 | 5 |
| Portugal | 3 | 0 | 0 | 3 | 19 | 93 | 3 |

Results
- South Africa 33 – 0 Portugal
- Samoa 22 – 10 Tonga
- South Africa 19 – 0 Tonga
- Samoa 29 – 14 Portugal
- Portugal 5 – 31 Tonga
- South Africa 14 – 21 Samoa

=== Pool C ===
| Team | Pld | W | D | L | F | A | TOTAL |
|---|---|---|---|---|---|---|---|
| Australia | 3 | 2 | 0 | 1 | 60 | 49 | 7 |
| England | 3 | 2 | 0 | 1 | 66 | 43 | 7 |
| United States | 3 | 1 | 0 | 2 | 57 | 60 | 5 |
| Kenya | 3 | 1 | 0 | 2 | 40 | 71 | 5 |

Results
- England 26 – 14 Kenya
- Australia 29 – 14 USA
- England 26 – 10 USA
- Australia 12 – 21 Kenya
- Kenya 5 – 33 USA
- England 14 – 19 Australia

=== Pool D ===
| Team | Pld | W | D | L | F | A | TOTAL |
|---|---|---|---|---|---|---|---|
| New Zealand | 3 | 3 | 0 | 0 | 100 | 24 | 9 |
| France | 3 | 2 | 0 | 1 | 49 | 36 | 7 |
| Chile | 3 | 1 | 0 | 2 | 29 | 88 | 5 |
| Canada | 3 | 0 | 0 | 3 | 41 | 71 | 3 |

Results
- New Zealand 31 – 19 Canada
- France 28 – 5 Chile
- New Zealand 43 – 5 Chile
- France 21 – 5 Canada
- Canada 17 – 19 Chile
- New Zealand 26 – 0 France

== Knockout rounds ==
- 1/4 final Bowl (Match 25) – Argentina 17 – 10 Portugal
- 1/4 final Bowl (Match 26) – Chile 12 – 31 Kenya
- 1/4 final Bowl (Match 27) – USA 7 – 14 Canada
- 1/4 final Bowl (Match 28) – Tonga 22 – 5 West Indies
- 1/4 final Cup (Match 29) – Fiji 26 – 21 South Africa
- 1/4 final Cup (Match 30) – New Zealand 19 – 7 England
- 1/4 final Cup (Match 31) – Australia 7 – 10 France
- 1/4 final Cup (Match 32) – Samoa 34 – 0 Scotland
- SF Shield (Match 33) – Portugal 42 – 10 Chile
- SF Shield (Match 34) – USA 17 – 0 West Indies
- SF Bowl (Match 35) – Argentina 22 – 5 Kenya
- SF Bowl (Match 36) – Canada 10 – 24 Tonga
- SF Plate (Match 37) – South Africa 21 – 14 England
- SF Plate (Match 38) – Australia 7 – 17 Scotland
- SF Cup (Match 39) – Fiji 19 – 10 New Zealand
- SF Cup (Match 40) – France 0 – 38 Samoa
- Final Shield (Match 41) – Portugal 5 – 26 USA
- Final Bowl (Match 42) – Argentina 17 – 22 Tonga
- Final Plate (Match 43) – South Africa 28 – 19 Scotland
- Final Cup (Match 44) – Fiji 38 – 24 Samoa

== Round 4 table ==
| Pos. | Country | (Emirate of Dubai) | (South Africa) | (New Zealand) | (United States) | (Hong Kong) | (Australia) | (England) | (Scotland) | Overall |
|---|---|---|---|---|---|---|---|---|---|---|
| 1 | New Zealand | 16 | 20 | 12 | 12 | | | | | 60 |
| 1 | Fiji | 12 | 12 | 16 | 20 | | | | | 60 |
| 3 | South Africa | 20 | 16 | 12 | 8 | | | | | 56 |
| 4 | Samoa | 8 | 4 | 20 | 16 | | | | | 48 |
| 5 | England | 12 | 12 | 8 | 4 | | | | | 36 |
| 6 | France | 6 | 4 | 6 | 12 | | | | | 28 |
| 7 | Australia | 4 | 2 | 0 | 4 | | | | | 10 |
| 8 | Wales | 0 | 8 | - | - | | | | | 8 |
| 8 | Canada | 4 | 0 | 4 | 0 | | | | | 8 |
| 10 | Tunisia | 0 | 6 | - | - | | | | | 6 |
| 10 | Scotland | 0 | 0 | 0 | 6 | | | | | 6 |
| 12 | Argentina | 2 | 0 | 2 | 0 | | | | | 4 |
| 12 | Kenya | 0 | 0 | 4 | 0 | | | | | 4 |
| 14 | Tonga | - | - | 0 | 2 | | | | | 2 |
| 15 | Portugal | 0 | 0 | 0 | 0 | | | | | 0 |
| 15 | West Indies | - | - | - | 0 | | | | | 0 |
| 15 | Chile | - | - | - | 0 | | | | | 0 |
| 15 | United States | - | - | - | 0 | | | | | 0 |
| 15 | Cook Islands | - | - | 0 | - | | | | | 0 |
| 15 | Papua New Guinea | - | - | 0 | - | | | | | 0 |
| 15 | Zimbabwe | 0 | 0 | - | - | | | | | 0 |
| 15 | Uganda | - | 0 | - | - | | | | | 0 |
| 15 | Arabian Gulf | 0 | - | - | - | | | | | 0 |

== See also ==
- United States national rugby union team
- North America 4

| Preceded by 2006 USA Sevens | USA Sevens; 2007 | Succeeded by 2008 USA Sevens |
