= 2006–07 IRB Sevens World Series =

Rugby sevens tournament

2006–07 IRB Sevens
- Series VIII
- Hosts: United Arab Emirates; South Africa; New Zealand; United States; Hong Kong; Australia; England; Scotland
- Nations: 32

Final positions
- Champions: New Zealand
- Runners-up: Fiji
- Third: Samoa

2006–07 IRB Sevens World Series was the eighth of an annual series of rugby sevens tournaments for full national sides run by the International Rugby Board since 1999–2000.

New Zealand were the series champions, winning the final tournament in Edinburgh to take the lead on the standings. In that event, the then-defending series champions Fiji would have clinched the season crown by defeating Wales in the Cup quarterfinals. However, a Wales upset win opened the door for New Zealand to take the season crown by winning the Cup in Edinburgh, which they did.

Sevens is traditionally played in a two-day tournament format; however, the most famous event, the Hong Kong Sevens, is played over three days.

== Calendar ==
Tournaments in Australia and Scotland were added for 2006-07. The Australian event returned after a three season hiatus to effectively replace Singapore. The Scotland event effectively replaced the Paris Sevens.

| Leg | Venue | Date | Winner |
|---|---|---|---|
| Dubai | Dubai Exiles Rugby Ground | December 1–2, 2006 | South Africa |
| South Africa | Outeniqua Park, George | December 8–9, 2006 | New Zealand |
| New Zealand | Westpac Stadium, Wellington | February 2–3, 2007 | Samoa |
| United States | Petco Park, San Diego | February 10–11, 2007 | Fiji |
| Hong Kong | Hong Kong Stadium | March 30-April 1, 2007 | Samoa |
| Australia | Adelaide Oval, Adelaide | April 7–8, 2007 | Fiji |
| London | Twickenham | May 26–27, 2007 | New Zealand |
| Scotland | Murrayfield, Edinburgh | June 2–3, 2007 | New Zealand |

== The season ==
In a normal event, 16 teams are entered; in Hong Kong, 24 teams enter. In each tournament, the teams are divided into pools of four teams, who play a round-robin within the pool. Points are awarded in each pool on a different schedule from most rugby tournaments—3 for a win, 2 for a draw, 1 for a loss. The first tiebreaker is the head-to-head result between the tied teams, followed by difference in points scored during the tournament.

Four trophies are awarded in each tournament, except for Hong Kong. In descending order of prestige, they are the Cup, whose winner is the overall tournament champion, Plate, Bowl and Shield. In Hong Kong, the Shield is not awarded. Each trophy is awarded at the end of a knockout tournament.

In a normal event, the top two teams in each pool advance to the Cup competition. The four quarterfinal losers drop into the bracket for the Plate. The Bowl is contested by the third-place finishers in each pool, while the Shield is contested by the last-place teams from each pool.

In Hong Kong, the six pool winners, plus the two highest-finishing second-place teams, advance to the Cup. The Plate participants are the eight highest-ranked teams remaining, while the lowest eight drop to the Bowl.

== Points schedule ==
The season championship was determined by the total points earned in all tournaments. The points schedules used for 2006–07 World Sevens Series were tweaked slightly from the previous season at the bottom end of each scale:

Points schedule: 16-team event
| Points | Place | Status |
|---|---|---|
| 20 | 1st | Cup winner |
| 16 | 2nd | Cup runner-up |
| 12 | 3rd^{(2-way share)} | Losing Cup semifinalists |
| 8 | 5th | Plate winner |
| 6 | 6th | Plate runner-up |
| 4 | 7th^{(2-way share)} | Losing Plate semifinalists |
| 2 | 9th | Bowl winner |

Points schedule: 24-team event
| Points | Place | Status |
|---|---|---|
| 30 | 1st | Cup winner |
| 24 | 2nd | Cup runner-up |
| 18 | 3rd^{(2-way share)} | Losing Cup semifinalists |
| 8 | 5th^{(4-way share)} | Losing Cup quarterfinalists |
| 4 | 9th | Plate winner |
| 3 | 10th | Plate runner-up |
| 2 | 11th^{(2-way share)} | Losing Plate semifinalists |
| 1 | 17th | Bowl winner |

== Final standings ==
The points awarded to the teams at each event, as well as their overall series totals, are shown in the table below.

2006–07 IRB Sevens – Series VIII
| Pos. | Event Team | Dubai | George | Wellington | San Diego | Hong Kong | Adelaide | London | Edinburgh | Points total |
|---|---|---|---|---|---|---|---|---|---|---|
| 1 | New Zealand | 16 | 20 | 12 | 12 | 18 | 12 | 20 | 20 | 130 |
| 2 | Fiji | 12 | 12 | 16 | 20 | 24 | 20 | 16 | 8 | 128 |
| 3 | Samoa | 8 | 4 | 20 | 16 | 30 | 16 | 12 | 16 | 126 |
| 4 | South Africa | 20 | 16 | 12 | 8 | 18 | 6 | 8 | 4 | 92 |
| 5 | England | 12 | 12 | 8 | 4 | 8 | 4 | 2 | 2 | 52 |
| 6 | Wales | 0 | 8 | – | – | 4 | 2 | 12 | 12 | 38 |
| 7 | Australia | 4 | 2 | 0 | 4 | 8 | 8 | 6 | 0 | 30 |
| 8 | France | 6 | 4 | 6 | 12 | 0 | 0 | 0 | 0 | 28 |
| 9 | Scotland | 0 | 0 | 0 | 6 | 8 | 4 | 4 | 4 | 26 |
| 10 | Argentina | 2 | 0 | 2 | 0 | 3 | 0 | 4 | 12 | 23 |
| 11 | Kenya | 0 | 0 | 4 | 0 | 0 | 12 | 0 | 6 | 22 |
| 12 | Tonga | – | – | 0 | 2 | 8 | 0 | – | – | 10 |
| 13 | Canada | 4 | 0 | 4 | 0 | 0 | 0 | 0 | 0 | 8 |
| 14 | Tunisia | 0 | 6 | – | – | 0 | – | – | – | 6 |
| 15* | Portugal | 0 | 0 | 0 | 0 | 2 | 0 | 0 | 0 | 2 |
| 15* | United States | – | – | 0 | 0 | 2 | – | – | – | 2 |
| 17 | Russia | – | – | – | – | 1 | – | 0 | 0 | 1 |

Sources: rugby7.com (archived), irb.com (archived), world.rugby (archived)

Legend
| Gold | Event Champions |
| Silver | Event Runner-ups |
Light blue line on the left indicates a core team eligible to participate in all events of the series.

Notes:

1. Gold indicates the event champions. Silver indicates the event runner-ups. A zero (0) is recorded in the event column where a team played in a tournament but did not gain any points. A dash (–) is recorded in the event column if a team did not compete at a tournament.
2. Teams that share a position in the standings (on the same total series points) are marked with an asterisk (*) beside their position.

== The events ==
=== Dubai ===
| Event | Winners | Score | Finalists | Semi Finalists |
|---|---|---|---|---|
| Cup | South Africa | 31–12 | New Zealand | Fiji; England |
| Plate | Samoa | 26–7 | France | Canada; Australia |
| Bowl | Argentina | 26–7 | Zimbabwe | Portugal; Tunisia |
| Shield | Wales | 33–0 | Arabian Gulf | Kenya; Scotland |

=== South Africa ===
| Event | Winners | Score | Finalists | Semi Finalists |
|---|---|---|---|---|
| Cup | New Zealand | 24–19 | South Africa | Fiji; England |
| Plate | Wales | 26–7 | Tunisia | France; Samoa |
| Bowl | Australia | 41–7 | Kenya | Argentina; Canada |
| Shield | Portugal | 14–12 | Zimbabwe | Scotland; Uganda |

=== New Zealand ===
| Event | Winners | Score | Finalists | Semi Finalists |
|---|---|---|---|---|
| Cup | Samoa | 17–14 | Fiji | New Zealand; South Africa |
| Plate | England | 21–12 | France | Canada; Kenya |
| Bowl | Argentina | 12–5 | Tonga | Australia; Cook Islands |
| Shield | Portugal | 26–24 | Scotland | Papua New Guinea; United States |

=== United States ===
| Event | Winners | Score | Finalists | Semi Finalists |
|---|---|---|---|---|
| Cup | Fiji | 38–24 | Samoa | France; New Zealand |
| Plate | South Africa | 28–19 | Scotland | Australia; England |
| Bowl | Tonga | 22–17 | Argentina | Canada; Kenya |
| Shield | United States | 26–5 | Portugal | West Indies; Chile |

=== Hong Kong ===
| Event | Winners | Score | Finalists | Semi Finalists | Quarter Finalists |
|---|---|---|---|---|---|
| Cup | Samoa | 27–22 | Fiji | New Zealand; South Africa | Australia; England; Scotland; Tonga |
| Plate | Wales | 26–19 | Argentina | Portugal; United States | Canada; Italy; Hong Kong; Tunisia |
| Bowl | Russia | 21–7 | France | Kenya; Japan | China; Chinese Taipei; South Korea; Sri Lanka |

=== Australia ===
| Event | Winners | Score | Finalists | Semi Finalists |
|---|---|---|---|---|
| Cup | Fiji | 21–7 | Samoa | Kenya; New Zealand |
| Plate | Australia | 31–0 | South Africa | England; Scotland |
| Bowl | Wales | 26–14 | Tonga | Argentina; France |
| Shield | Canada | 43–17 | Japan | Portugal; Hong Kong |

=== London ===
| Event | Winners | Score | Finalists | Semi Finalists |
|---|---|---|---|---|
| Cup | New Zealand | 29–7 | Fiji | Samoa; Wales |
| Plate | South Africa | 14–5 | Australia | Argentina; Scotland |
| Bowl | England | 26–14 | Portugal | France; Russia |
| Shield | Kenya | 15–0 | Italy | Canada; Georgia |

=== Scotland ===
| Event | Winners | Score | Finalists | Semi Finalists |
|---|---|---|---|---|
| Cup | New Zealand | 34–5 | Samoa | Argentina; Wales |
| Plate | Fiji | 31–7 | Kenya | South Africa; Scotland |
| Bowl | England | 31–0 | Portugal | Australia; Georgia |
| Shield | France | 21–12 | Russia | Canada; Italy |
