= 2007 London Sevens =

International Rugby Event

The London Sevens is played annually as part of the IRB Sevens World Series for international rugby sevens (seven a side version of rugby union). The 2007 competition, which took place on 26 and 27 May, was held at Twickenham and was part of the 2006–07 IRB Sevens World Series.

New Zealand were overall winners, defeating defending series champions and current 2006-07 leaders Fiji 29–7 in the Cup final. However, the Fijians put themselves in good position to win the overall season crown; they only need make the Cup semifinals in the final event, the Edinburgh Sevens, to successfully defend their season title.

== Pool Stages ==
=== Pool A ===
Team	Pld	W	D	L	F	A	TOTAL
Fiji	3	2	1	0	102	38	8
Argentina	3	2	1	0	93	31	8
France	3	1	0	2	55	52	5
Russia	3	0	0	3	7	136	3

Results
- Fiji 19-19 Argentina
- France 24-7 Russia
- Fiji 62-0 Russia
- France 12-24 Argentina
- Argentina 50-0 Russia
- Fiji 21-19 France

=== Pool B ===
Team	Pld	W	D	L	F	A	TOTAL
Samoa	3	3	0	0	94	17	9
Australia	3	2	0	1	67	36	7
Canada	3	1	0	2	50	63	5
Georgia	3	0	0	3	10	105	3

Results
- Samoa 34-5 Canada
- Australia 36-0 Georgia
- Samoa 43-5 Georgia
- Australia 24-19 Canada
- Canada 26-5 Georgia
- Samoa 17-7 Australia

=== Pool C ===
Team	Pld	W	D	L	F	A	TOTAL
New Zealand	3	3	0	0	134	17	9
Scotland	3	1	1	1	45	62	6
Italy	3	1	0	2	29	72	5
Kenya	3	0	1	2	34	91	4

Results
- New Zealand 43-10 Kenya
- Scotland 19-0 Italy
- New Zealand 48-0 Italy
- Scotland 19-19 Kenya
- Kenya 5-29 Italy
- New Zealand 43-7 Scotland

=== Pool D ===
Team	Pld	W	D	L	F	A	TOTAL
Wales	3	2	0	1	51	38	7
South Africa	3	2	0	1	55	43	7
England	3	2	0	1	36	50	7
Portugal	3	0	0	3	40	51	3

Results
- South Africa 24-14 Wales
- England 19-14 Portugal
- South Africa 17-12 Portugal
- England 0-22 Wales
- Wales 15-14 Portugal
- South Africa 14-17 England

== Finals ==
- 1/4 final Bowl - France 31-0 Georgia
- 1/4 final Bowl - England 19-0 Kenya
- 1/4 final Bowl - Italy 0-5 Portugal
- 1/4 final Bowl - Canada 5-19 Russia
- 1/4 final Cup - Fiji 26-10 Australia
- 1/4 final Cup - Wales 15-5 Scotland
- 1/4 final Cup - New Zealand 14-0 South Africa
- 1/4 final Cup - Samoa 39-10 Argentina
- SF Shield - Georgia 0-19 Kenya
- SF Shield - Italy 17-12 (aet) Canada
- SF Bowl - France 7-17 England
- SF Bowl - Portugal 19-12 Russia
- SF Plate - Australia 15-5 Scotland
- SF Plate - South Africa 17-14 Argentina
- SF Cup - Fiji 24-7 Wales
- SF Cup - New Zealand 19-0 Samoa
- Final Shield - Kenya 15-0 Italy
- Final Bowl - England 10-0 Portugal
- Final Plate - Australia 5-14 South Africa
- Final Cup - Fiji 7-29 New Zealand

== Round 7 table ==
Pos.	Country	(Emirate of Dubai)	(South Africa)	(New Zealand)	(United States)	(Hong Kong)	(Australia)	(England)	(Scotland)	Overall
1	Fiji	12	12	16	20	24	20	16		120
2	Samoa	8	4	20	16	30	16	12		110
2	New Zealand	16	20	12	12	18	12	20		110
4	South Africa	20	16	12	8	18	6	8		88
5	England	12	12	8	4	8	4	2		50
6	Australia	4	2	0	4	8	8	6		30
7	France	6	4	6	12	0	0	0		28
8	Wales	0	8	-	-	4	2	12		26
9	Scotland	0	0	0	6	8	4	4		22
10	Kenya	0	0	4	0	0	12	0		16
11	Argentina	2	0	2	0	3	0	4		11
12	Tonga	-	-	0	2	8	0	-		10
13	Canada	4	0	4	0	0	0	-		8
14	Tunisia	0	6	-	-	0	0	-		6
15	Russia	-	-	-	-	1	-	0		1
16	Portugal	0	0	0	0	0	0	0		0
16	Italy	-	-	-	-	0	-	0		0
16	Georgia	-	-	-	-	-	-	0		0
16	Japan	-	-	-	-	0	0	-		0
16	Hong Kong	-	-	-	-	0	0	-		0
16	United States	-	-	-	0	0	-	-		0
16	South Korea	-	-	-	-	0	-	-		0
16	Sri Lanka	-	-	-	-	0	-	-		0
16	China	-	-	-	-	0	-	-		0
16	West Indies	-	-	-	0	-	-	-		0
16	Chile	-	-	-	0	-	-	-		0
16	Cook Islands	-	-	0	-	-	-	-		0
16	Papua New Guinea	-	-	0	-	-	-	-		0
16	Zimbabwe	0	0	-	-	-	-	-		0
16	Uganda	-	0	-	-	-	-	-		0
16	Arabian Gulf	0	-	-	-	-	-	-		0
