= Wales national rugby sevens team =

Wales
- Union: Welsh Rugby Union
- Emblem: Three feathers
- Coach: Richie Pugh
- Top scorer: Luke Morgan (655)
- Most tries: Luke Morgan (131)
Team kit	Change kit

World Cup Sevens
- Appearances: 7 (First in 1993)
- Best result: Champions (2009)

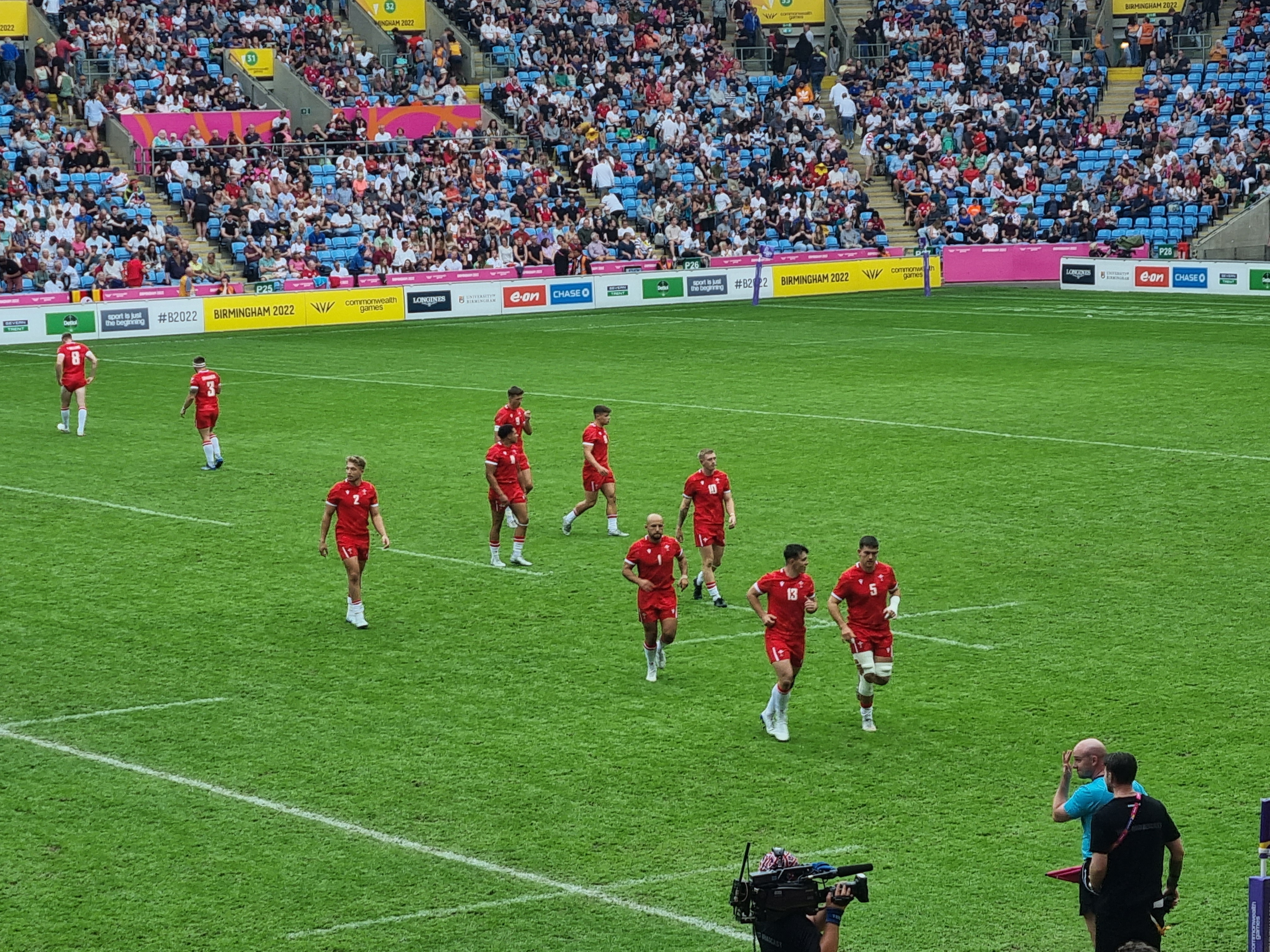
Team Wales at the 2022 Commonwealth Games.

The Wales national rugby sevens team did compete at the annual World Rugby Sevens Series between 2000 and 2022, however merged with England and Scotland to form the Great Britain sevens team from the 2022–23 season onward. The team also competes at the quadrennial Rugby World Cup Sevens and the Commonwealth Games.

Wales were the World Cup Sevens Champions after winning the 2009 Rugby World Cup Sevens in the United Arab Emirates. But they relinquished that title after failing to defend their crown at the 2013 Rugby World Cup Sevens in Moscow.

The Welsh sevens squad was disbanded by the Welsh Rugby Union (WRU) due to financial constraints. After a three-year absence, the Wales sevens team returned to international competition in the 2006–07 season. They competed at half of the eight tournaments and won the plate competition (fifth place) at each of them. They repeated this feat at the 2006 Commonwealth Games.

The star of the 2005–06 squad was Neath RFC and Ospreys player James Hook. Hook later progressed to the Wales national 15-a-side team. In 2006–07, Wales competed in the Dubai, South Africa, Australia, Hong Kong, Scotland and England legs of the IRB's World Sevens Series, reaching the semi-finals of the cup at Twickenham and Murrayfield Stadium. Wales have been a core team that has competed in all legs of the IRB Sevens Series since the 2007–08 season.

At the 2016 USA Sevens, Wales beat Canada, Portugal, Scotland and France to win the Bowl final and claim 9th place.

== Tournament history ==
=== Rugby World Cup Sevens ===
World Cup Sevens record
Year	Round	Position	Played	Won	Lost	Drew
(Scotland) 1993	Plate Semifinalists	11th	6	3	3	0
(Hong Kong) 1997	Plate Quarterfinalists	13th	5	1	3	1
(Argentina) 2001	Plate Semifinalists	11th	7	3	3	1
(Hong Kong) 2005	Did not enter					
(United Arab Emirates) 2009	Champions	1st	6	5	1	0
(Russia) 2013	Quarterfinalists	5th	4	3	1	0
(United States) 2018	Round of 16	11th	5	3	2	0
(South Africa) 2022	Challenge quarter-finals	15th	5	2	3	0
Total	1 Title	7/8	38	20	16	2

=== Commonwealth Games ===
Commonwealth Games record
Year	Round	Position	Pld	W	L	D
(Malaysia) 1998	Quarterfinalists	5th	5	2	3	0
(England) 2002	Plate Semifinalists	7th	5	2	3	0
(Australia) 2006	Plate Winners	5th	6	4	2	0
(India) 2010	Plate Semifinalists	7th	5	2	3	0
(Scotland) 2014	Plate Finalists	6th	6	3	3	0
(Australia) 2018	Seventh playoff	7th	5	3	2	0
(England) 2022	Ninth–twelfth playoff	11th	5	2	3	0
Total	0 Titles	7/7	37	18	19	0

== 2009 Rugby World Cup Sevens ==
In Wales's first ever cup final appearance in a major rugby sevens event, Wales played Argentina in the 2009 World Cup Final.

In the Group stages Wales beat Zimbabwe 31–5 and Uruguay 27–0 before losing to Argentina 14–0 in the final pool match, leaving Wales uncertain of a cup quarterfinals spot. With results going their way Wales made it to the cup quarterfinals as one of the second place qualifiers for the first time in their history.

Wales beat favourites New Zealand in the quarterfinals 15–14, and defeated Samoa in the semifinals 19–12.

Wales faced Argentina for the second time in the tournament in the Final. Wales started with the same team that played against New Zealand and Samoa earlier in the day. At half time Wales had a lead of 12–7 after tries from Richie Pugh and Tal Selley. In the second half Argentina levelled the score at 12–12. With less than 90 seconds left, Wales's Aled Thomas scored underneath the posts and with a successful conversion put Wales into the lead at 19–12. Argentina claimed the restart. After the siren sounded to indicate there was no time left on the clock Argentina fumbled the ball in a ruck leading to the ball being kicked out of play and Wales being crowned the 2009 Sevens Rugby World Cup Champions.

2009 Rugby World Cup Sevens (Winners)
Day	Round	Opposition	Score	Scorers
Day one	Group stage	Zimbabwe	31 – 5	Tries: C. Hill (3), L. Williams, A. Brew; Conv: A. Thomas (3)
Day two	Group stage	Uruguay	27 – 0	Tries: R. Pugh (2), A. Thomas, J. Merriman, L. Beach; Conv: L. Williams (1)
Day two	Group stage	Argentina	0–14	Tries: Conv:
Day three	Cup Quarterfinal	New Zealand	15 – 14	Tries: L. Williams, T. Isaacs, R. Pugh; Conv:
Day three	Cup Semifinal	Samoa	19 – 12	Tries: T. Isaacs, T. Selley, A. Brew; Conv: A. Thomas (2)
Day three	Cup Final	Argentina	19 – 12	Tries: A. Thomas, T. Selley, R. Pugh; Conv: A. Thomas (2)

=== 2009 World Cup winning squad ===
The 12-man squad, coached by Paul John of Pontypridd, for the 2009 Rugby World Cup Sevens.

Player	Club
Rhodri McAtee	Cornish Pirates
Lee Williams	Scarlets
Tom Isaacs	Newport Gwent Dragons
Craig Hill	Newport Gwent Dragons
James Merriman	Unattached
Tal Selley	Newport Gwent Dragons
Aled Brew	Newport Gwent Dragons
Aled Thomas	London Welsh
Rhys Webb	Ospreys
Richie Pugh	Exeter Chiefs
Dafydd Hewitt	Cardiff Blues
Lee Beach (c)	Neath

== World Rugby Sevens Series record ==
2006–2007 Series (sixth overall)
First Day	Event	Finish
2006-12-01	Dubai	Shield winners
2006-12-08	George	Plate winners
2007-02-02	Wellington	Did not compete
2007-02-10	San Diego	Did not compete
2007-03-30	Hong Kong	Plate winners
2007-04-07	Adelaide	Bowl winners
2007-05-26	London	Cup semi-finalists
2007-06-02	Edinburgh	Cup semi-finalists

2007–2008 Series (eighth overall)
First Day	Event	Finish
2007-11-30	Dubai	Bowl semi-finalists
2007-12-07	George	Bowl winners
2008-02-01	Wellington	Plate runners-up
2008-02-09	San Diego	Bowl winners
2008-03-28	Hong Kong	Cup Quarter finalists
2008-04-05	Adelaide	Bowl runners-up
2008-05-25	London	Bowl runners-up
2008-05-31	Edinburgh	Cup semi-finalists

2008–2009 Series (ninth overall)
First Day	Event	Finish
2008-11-29	Dubai	Bowl semi-finalists
2008-12-06	George	Bowl semi-finalists
2009-02-07	Wellington	Plate runners-up
2009-02-15	San Diego	Bowl semi-finalists
2009-03-29	Hong Kong	Plate semi-finalists
2009-04-05	Adelaide	Plate semi-finalists
2009-05-24	London	Bowl runners-up
2009-05-31	Edinburgh	Cup semi-finalists

2009–2010 Series
First Day	Event	Finish
2009-12-04	Dubai	Bowl winners
2009-12-11	George	Bowl winners
2010-02-05	Wellington	Bowl winners
2010-02-13	Las Vegas	Plate semi-finalists
2010-03-19	Adelaide	Plate semi-finalists
2010-03-26	Hong Kong	Bowl runners-up
2010-05-22	London	Plate semi-finalists
2010-05-29	Edinburgh	Bowl winners

== Team ==
=== Current squad ===
There is no current squad as the team was disbanded in 2022, WRU cited financial pressure and lack of public interest in Wales.

== Notable former players ==
- (Wales) Lee Byrne
- (Wales) Taliesin Selley
- (Wales) Jason Forster
- (Wales) James Hook
- (Wales) Rhys Oakley
- (Wales) Robin Sowden-Taylor
- (Wales) Josh Turnbull
- (Wales) Andy Powell
- (Wales) Wayne Proctor
- (Wales) Alex Cuthbert
- (Wales) David Evans
- (Wales) Richie Pugh
- (Wales) James Davies

== Notable former coaches ==
- (Wales) Dai Rees
- (Wales) Colin Hillman
- (Wales) Gareth Baber
