= 2007 Wellington Sevens =

The Wellington Sevens, also known as the New Zealand Sevens or for sponsorship reasons the NZI Sevens, is played annually as part of the IRB Sevens World Series for international rugby sevens (seven-a-side version of rugby union). The 2007 competition, which took place on 2 and 3 February was played at Westpac Stadium in Wellington as part of the 2006–07 IRB Sevens World Series.

The competition was won by Samoa, marking their first-ever overall title in a leg of the IRB Sevens World Series.

== Pool stages ==
=== Pool A ===
| Team | Pld | W | D | L | F | A | TOTAL |
|---|---|---|---|---|---|---|---|
| Fiji | 3 | 3 | 0 | 0 | 132 | 7 | 9 |
| France | 3 | 2 | 0 | 1 | 46 | 75 | 7 |
| Portugal | 3 | 1 | 0 | 2 | 40 | 85 | 5 |
| United States | 3 | 0 | 0 | 3 | 35 | 86 | 3 |

Results
- Fiji 42 – 0 Portugal
- France 17 – 14 USA
- Fiji 43 – 0 USA
- France 22 – 14 Portugal
- Portugal 26 – 21 USA
- Fiji 47 – 7 France

=== Pool B ===
| Team | Pld | W | D | L | F | A | TOTAL |
|---|---|---|---|---|---|---|---|
| South Africa | 3 | 3 | 0 | 0 | 82 | 29 | 9 |
| Canada | 3 | 1 | 0 | 2 | 48 | 60 | 5 |
| Australia | 3 | 1 | 0 | 2 | 54 | 70 | 5 |
| Cook Islands | 3 | 1 | 0 | 2 | 53 | 78 | 5 |

Results
- South Africa 24 – 10 Canada
- Australia 35 – 17 Cook Islands
- South Africa 31 – 12 Cook Islands
- Australia 12 – 26 Canada
- Canada 12 – 24 Cook Islands
- South Africa 27 – 7 Australia

=== Pool C ===
| Team | Pld | W | D | L | F | A | TOTAL |
|---|---|---|---|---|---|---|---|
| Samoa | 3 | 3 | 0 | 0 | 76 | 38 | 9 |
| England | 3 | 2 | 0 | 1 | 67 | 38 | 7 |
| Scotland | 3 | 1 | 0 | 2 | 55 | 76 | 5 |
| Papua New Guinea | 3 | 0 | 0 | 3 | 19 | 65 | 3 |

Results
- England 33 – 12 Scotland
- Samoa 26 – 0 Papua New Guinea
- England 22 – 7 Papua New Guinea
- Samoa 31 – 26 Scotland
- Scotland 17 – 12 Papua New Guinea
- England 12 – 19 Samoa

=== Pool D ===
| Team | Pld | W | D | L | F | A | TOTAL |
|---|---|---|---|---|---|---|---|
| New Zealand | 3 | 3 | 0 | 0 | 90 | 10 | 9 |
| Kenya | 3 | 2 | 0 | 1 | 56 | 59 | 7 |
| Tonga | 3 | 1 | 0 | 2 | 26 | 55 | 5 |
| Argentina | 3 | 0 | 0 | 3 | 31 | 79 | 3 |

Results
- New Zealand 38 – 0 Kenya
- Argentina 12 – 14 Tonga
- New Zealand 19 – 5 Tonga
- Argentina 14 – 32 Kenya
- Kenya 24 – 7 Tonga
- New Zealand 33 – 5 Argentina

== Finals ==
- 1/4 final Bowl – Portugal 12 – 24 Cook Islands
- 1/4 final Bowl – Tonga 19 – 12 Papua New Guinea
- 1/4 final Bowl – Scotland 12 – 17 Argentina
- 1/4 final Bowl – Australia 33 – 12 USA
- 1/4 final Cup – Fiji 60 – 0 Canada
- 1/4 final Cup – New Zealand 14 – 7 England
- 1/4 final Cup – Samoa 26 – 21 Kenya
- 1/4 final Cup – South Africa 26 – 14 France
- SF Shield – Portugal 26 – 19 Papua New Guinea
- SF Shield – Scotland 26 – 19 USA
- SF Bowl – Cook Islands 7 – 29 Tonga
- SF Bowl – Argentina 26 – 21 Australia
- SF Plate – Canada 7 – 29 England
- SF Plate – Kenya 5 – 26 France
- SF Cup – Fiji 31 – 0 New Zealand
- SF Cup – Samoa 14 – 12 South Africa
- Final Shield – Portugal 26 – 24 Scotland
- Final Bowl – Tonga 5 – 12 Argentina
- Final Plate – England 21 – 12 France
- Final Cup – Fiji 14 – 17 Samoa

== Round 3 table ==
| Pos. | Country | (Emirate of Dubai) | (South Africa) | (New Zealand) | (United States) | (Hong Kong) | (Australia) | (England) | (Scotland) | Overall |
|---|---|---|---|---|---|---|---|---|---|---|
| 1 | South Africa | 20 | 16 | 12 | | | | | | 48 |
| 1 | New Zealand | 16 | 20 | 12 | | | | | | 48 |
| 3 | Fiji | 12 | 12 | 16 | | | | | | 40 |
| 4 | England | 12 | 12 | 8 | | | | | | 32 |
| 4 | Samoa | 8 | 4 | 20 | | | | | | 32 |
| 6 | France | 6 | 4 | 6 | | | | | | 16 |
| 7 | Wales | 0 | 8 | – | | | | | | 8 |
| 7 | Canada | 4 | 0 | 4 | | | | | | 8 |
| 9 | Australia | 4 | 2 | 0 | | | | | | 6 |
| 9 | Tunisia | 0 | 6 | – | | | | | | 6 |
| 11 | Argentina | 2 | 0 | 2 | | | | | | 4 |
| 11 | Kenya | 0 | 0 | 4 | | | | | | 4 |
| 13 | Portugal | 0 | 0 | 0 | | | | | | 0 |
| 13 | Scotland | 0 | 0 | 0 | | | | | | 0 |
| 13 | Zimbabwe | 0 | 0 | – | | | | | | 0 |
| 13 | Cook Islands | – | – | 0 | | | | | | 0 |
| 13 | Tonga | – | – | 0 | | | | | | 0 |
| 13 | Papua New Guinea | – | – | 0 | | | | | | 0 |
| 13 | Uganda | – | 0 | – | | | | | | 0 |
| 13 | Arabian Gulf | 0 | – | – | | | | | | 0 |
