= 2007 Adelaide Sevens =

- IRB Sevens VIII
- Host nation: Australia
- Date: 7–8 April 2007

Cup
- Champion: Fiji
- Runner-up: Samoa

Plate
- Winner: Australia
- Runner-up: South Africa

Bowl
- Winner: Wales
- Runner-up: Tonga

Shield
- Winner: Canada
- Runner-up: Japan

Tournament details
- Matches played: 44

The 2007 Adelaide Sevens, promoted as the International Rugby Sevens Adelaide 2007, was a rugby sevens tournament that was part of the IRB Sevens World Series in the 2006–07 season. It was the Australian Sevens leg of the series, held over the weekend of 7 and 8 April at the Adelaide Oval in South Australia.

It was the first such tournament in Adelaide, and replaced the Singapore Sevens. The competition was won by Fiji who defeated Samoa 21–7 in the Cup final.

The tournament was the fourth completed edition of the Australian Sevens, with the event returning after a three-year absence following the 2003 Brisbane Sevens.

== Format ==
The teams were drawn into four pools of four teams each. Each team played the other teams in their pool once, with 3 points awarded for a win, 2 points for a draw, and 1 point for a loss (no points awarded for a forfeit). The top two teams from each pool advanced to the Cup/Plate brackets. The bottom two teams from each group went on to the Bowl/Shield brackets.

== Teams ==
The participating teams were:

- Argentina
- Australia
- Canada
- England
- Fiji
- France
- Hong Kong
- Japan
- Kenya
- New Zealand
- Portugal
- South Africa
- Samoa
- Scotland
- Tonga
- Wales

== Pool stage ==
Play on the first day of the tournament consisted of matches between teams in the same pool on a round robin basis. The following is a list of the recorded results.

=== Pool A ===
Team	Pld	W	D	L	F	A	TOTAL
England	3	2	0	1	56	36	7
Fiji	3	2	0	1	67	48	7
Tonga	3	2	0	1	52	41	7
Canada	3	0	0	3	33	83	3

Results
- Fiji 33 - 7 Canada
- England 5 - 12 Tonga
- Fiji 22 - 21 Tonga
- England 31 - 12 Canada
- Canada 14 - 19 Tonga
- Fiji 12 - 20 England

=== Pool B ===
Team	Pld	W	D	L	F	A	TOTAL
South Africa	3	3	0	0	93	7	9
Kenya	3	1	0	2	46	60	5
France	3	1	0	2	52	79	5
Japan	3	1	0	2	31	76	5

Results
- South Africa 15 - 0 Kenya
- France 12 - 19 Japan
- South Africa 42 - 0 Japan
- France 33 - 24 Kenya
- Kenya 22 - 12 Japan
- South Africa 36 - 7 France

=== Pool C ===
Team	Pld	W	D	L	F	A	TOTAL
New Zealand	3	3	0	0	124	20	9
Australia	3	2	0	1	75	36	7
Wales	3	1	0	2	49	81	5
Hong Kong	3	0	0	3	20	131	3

Results
- New Zealand 42 - 10 Wales
- Australia 46 - 0 Hong Kong
- Australia 24 - 15 Wales
- New Zealand 61 - 5 Hong Kong
- Wales 24 - 15 Hong Kong
- New Zealand 21 - 5 Australia

=== Pool D ===
Team	Pld	W	D	L	F	A	TOTAL
Samoa	3	3	0	0	95	17	9
Scotland	3	2	0	1	53	52	7
Argentina	3	1	0	2	45	60	5
Portugal	3	0	0	3	24	88	3

Results
- Samoa 26 - 10 Scotland
- Argentina 19 - 17 Portugal
- Samoa 50 - 0 Portugal
- Argentina 19 - 24 Scotland
- Scotland 19 - 7 Portugal
- Samoa 19 - 7 Argentina

== Finals ==
Play on the second day of the tournament consisted of finals matches for the Shield, Bowl, Plate, and Cup competitions. The following is a list of the recorded results.

- 1/4 final Bowl - Tonga 36 - 12 Japan
- 1/4 final Bowl - Argentina 33 - 5 Hong Kong
- 1/4 final Bowl - Wales 24 - 7 Portugal
- 1/4 final Bowl - France 17 - 14 Canada
- 1/4 final Cup - England 12 - 17 Kenya
- 1/4 final Cup - Samoa 22 - 17 Australia
- 1/4 final Cup - New Zealand 40 - 14 Scotland
- 1/4 final Cup - South Africa 17 - 22 Fiji
- SF Shield - Japan 29 - 10 Hong Kong
- SF Shield - Portugal 12 - 14 Canada
- SF Bowl - Tonga 17 - 12 Argentina
- SF Bowl - Wales 19 - 14 France
- SF Plate - England 21 - 26 Australia
- SF Plate - Scotland 5 - 42 South Africa
- SF Cup - Kenya 0 - 31 Samoa
- SF Cup - New Zealand 17 - 24 Fiji
- Final Shield - Japan 17 - 43 Canada
- Final Bowl - Tonga 14 - 26 Wales
- Final Plate - Australia 31 - 0 South Africa
- Final Cup - Samoa 7 - 21 Fiji

== Round 6 table ==
Pos.	Country	(Emirate of Dubai)	(South Africa)	(New Zealand)	(United States)	(Hong Kong)	(Australia)	(England)	(Scotland)	Overall
1	Fiji	12	12	16	20	24	20			104
2	Samoa	8	4	20	16	30	16			94
3	New Zealand	16	20	12	12	18	12			90
4	South Africa	20	16	12	8	18	6			80
5	England	12	12	8	4	8	4			48
6	France	6	4	6	12	0	0			28
7	Australia	4	2	0	4	8	8			24
8	Scotland	0	0	0	6	8	4			18
9	Kenya	0	0	4	0	0	12			16
10	Wales	0	8	-	-	4	2			14
11	Tonga	-	-	0	2	8	0			10
12	Canada	4	0	4	0	0	0			8
13	Argentina	2	0	2	0	3	0			7
14	Tunisia	0	6	-	-	0	0			6
15	Russia	-	-	-	-	1	-			1
16	Portugal	0	0	0	0	0	0			0
16	Japan	-	-	-	-	0	0			0
16	Hong Kong	-	-	-	-	0	0			0
16	United States	-	-	-	0	0	-			0
16	South Korea	-	-	-	-	0	-			0
16	Sri Lanka	-	-	-	-	0	-			0
16	China	-	-	-	-	0	-			0
16	Italy	-	-	-	-	0				0
16	West Indies	-	-	-	0	-	-			0
16	Chile	-	-	-	0	-	-			0
16	Cook Islands	-	-	0	-	-	-			0
16	Papua New Guinea	-	-	0	-	-	-			0
16	Zimbabwe	0	0	-	-	-	-			0
16	Uganda	-	0	-	-	-	-			0
16	Arabian Gulf	0	-	-	-	-	-			0
