= 2007 Hong Kong Sevens =

International rugby sevens tournament

- Countries: 36
- Champions: Samoa

The 2007 Hong Kong Sevens was a rugby sevens tournament held on 30 March until 1 April 2007 in Hong Kong at the 40,000 capacity Hong Kong Stadium. The event, the fifth leg of the 2006–07 IRB Sevens World Series, was won by Samoa.

== The Format ==
The Hong Kong Sevens is unique among the IRB Sevens events in several ways.

First, because 24 teams compete instead of the 16 that compete in all other series events, the Hong Kong Sevens is divided into six pools instead of the normal four.

Also because of the expanded number of teams, the points system for this tournament is also different. Most significantly, the winning team picks up 30 points instead of the normal 20, and the runner-up earns 24 points instead of the normal 16.

Finally, only three trophies are awarded instead of the four in a normal IRB Sevens event. The Shield is not awarded, leaving the Bowl, Plate, and Cup. Teams are assigned to the knockout tournaments for each trophy as follows:

- Cup — The six pool winners, plus the two top-rated second-place teams
- Plate — The four remaining second-place teams, plus the four top-rated third-place teams
- Bowl — The eight remaining teams

Each of the top four seeds won an IRB Sevens World Series event in the 2006–07 season, with defending Hong Kong champions England out to capture a first Cup title of the season.

== Ticket ==
The public ticket sale for the Hong Kong Sevens 2007 was held in December 2006 at the Hong Kong Stadium. Hong Kong residents enjoyed the opportunity to purchase tickets for the event with the launch of the HKRFU's local ticket campaign in October 2006, tickets sold through Hong Kong rugby clubs and other rugby stakeholders, sponsors and long-term event patrons in Hong Kong. This most recent public sale marked the final opportunity for local spectators to secure their tickets for the event.

== The tournament ==
=== Pool stages ===
==== Pool A ====
Pos	Team	Pld	W	D	L	PF	PA	PD	Pts
1	Fiji	3	3	0	0	99	7	+92	9
2	Scotland	3	2	0	1	84	54	+30	7
3	Portugal	3	1	0	2	61	66	−5	5
4	Sri Lanka	3	0	0	3	28	145	−117	3

Results

- Fiji 45 - 0 Sri Lanka
- Scotland 31 - 7 Portugal
- Scotland 53 - 21 Sri Lanka
- Fiji 28 - 7 Portugal
- Portugal 47 - 7 Sri Lanka
- Fiji 26 - 0 Scotland

==== Pool B ====
Pos	Team	Pld	W	D	L	PF	PA	PD	Pts
1	South Africa	3	3	0	0	121	12	+109	9
2	Tonga	3	2	0	1	94	55	+39	7
3	Wales	3	1	0	2	68	64	+4	5
4	Chinese Taipei	3	0	0	3	17	169	−152	3

Results

- South Africa 59 - 0 Chinese Taipei
- Wales 7 - 33 Tonga
- Wales 61 - 0 Chinese Taipei
- South Africa 31 - 12 Tonga
- Tonga 49 - 17 Chinese Taipei
- South Africa 31 - 0 Wales

==== Pool C ====
Pos	Team	Pld	W	D	L	PF	PA	PD	Pts
1	Samoa	3	3	0	0	144	12	+132	9
2	Canada	3	1	0	2	45	67	−22	5
3	Japan	3	1	0	2	52	92	−40	5
4	China	3	1	0	2	38	108	−70	5

Results

- Samoa 49 - 5 China
- Canada 26 - 5 Japan
- Canada 19 - 21 China
- Samoa 54 - 7 Japan
- Japan 40 - 12 China
- Samoa 41 - 0 Canada

==== Pool D ====
Pos	Team	Pld	W	D	L	PF	PA	PD	Pts
1	New Zealand	3	3	0	0	145	19	+126	9
2	Italy	3	1	0	2	36	63	−27	5
3	Kenya	3	1	0	2	33	79	−46	5
4	Russia	3	1	0	2	27	80	−53	5

Results

- New Zealand 41 - 5 Italy
- Kenya 14 - 10 Russia
- Kenya 5 - 19 Italy
- New Zealand 54 - 0 Russia
- Russia 17 - 12 Italy
- New Zealand 50 - 14 Kenya

==== Pool E ====
Pos	Team	Pld	W	D	L	PF	PA	PD	Pts
1	England	3	3	0	0	95	35	+60	9
2	Argentina	3	2	0	1	57	45	+12	7
3	Hong Kong	3	1	0	2	38	69	−31	5
4	South Korea	3	0	0	3	40	81	−41	3

Results

- England 38 - 7 Hong Kong
- Argentina 24 - 14 Korea
- Argentina 19 - 12 Hong Kong
- England 38 - 14 Korea
- Korea 12 - 19 Hong Kong
- England 19 - 14 Argentina

==== Pool F ====
Pos	Team	Pld	W	D	L	PF	PA	PD	Pts
1	Australia	3	3	0	0	62	40	+22	9
2	United States	3	2	0	1	42	25	+17	7
3	Tunisia	3	1	0	2	38	45	−7	5
4	France	3	0	0	3	31	63	−32	3

Results

- France 5 - 14 USA
- Australia 19 - 12 Tunisia
- Australia 15 - 14 USA
- France 12 - 21 Tunisia
- Tunisia 5 - 14 USA
- France 14 - 28 Australia

=== Finals ===
==== Bowl ====
Quarter-finals
Match 37
Japan	45
Chinese Taipei	0
Match 38
France	36
China	7
Match 39
Russia	19
South Korea	10
Match 40
Sri Lanka	14
Kenya	26

Semi-finals
Match 49
Japan	7
France	24
Match 50
Russia	38
Kenya	7

Final
Match 50
France	7
Russia	21

==== Plate ====
Quarter-finals
Match 41
United States	19
Hong Kong	12
Match 42
Wales	20
Italy	7
Match 43
Canada	21
Portugal	22
Match 44
Tunisia	19
Argentina	22

Semi-finals
Match 51
United States	19
Wales	22
Match 52
Portugal	10
Argentina	12

Final
Match 56
Wales	26
Argentina	19

==== Cup ====
Quarter-finals
Match 45
Fiji	28
Scotland	7
Match 46
England	0
New Zealand	26
Match 47
Samoa	26
Australia	17
Match 48
Tonga	7
South Africa	19

Semi-finals
Match 53
Fiji	21
New Zealand	12
Match 54
Samoa	10
South Africa	0

Final
Match 57
Fiji	22
Samoa	27

== Round 5 table ==
Pos.	Country	(Emirate of Dubai)	(South Africa)	(New Zealand)	(United States)	(Hong Kong)	(Australia)	(England)	(Scotland)	Overall
1	Fiji	12	12	16	20	24				84
2	New Zealand	16	20	12	12	18				78
2	Samoa	8	4	20	16	30				78
4	South Africa	20	16	12	8	18				74
5	England	12	12	8	4	8				44
6	France	6	4	6	12	0				28
7	Australia	4	2	0	4	8				18
8	Scotland	0	0	0	6	8				14
9	Wales	0	8	-	-	4				12
10	Tonga	-	-	0	2	8				10
11	Canada	4	0	4	0	0				8
12	Argentina	2	0	2	0	3				7
13	Tunisia	0	6	-	-	0				6
14	Kenya	0	0	4	0	0				4
15	Russia	-	-	-	-	1				1
16	Portugal	0	0	0	0	0				0
16	United States	-	-	-	0	0				0
16	Japan	-	-	-	-	0				0
16	South Korea	-	-	-	-	0				0
16	Sri Lanka	-	-	-	-	0				0
16	China	-	-	-	-	0				0
16	Hong Kong	-	-	-	-	0				0
16	Italy	-	-	-	-	0				0
16	West Indies	-	-	-	0	-				0
16	Chile	-	-	-	0	-				0
16	Cook Islands	-	-	0	-	-				0
16	Papua New Guinea	-	-	0	-	-				0
16	Zimbabwe	0	0	-	-	-				0
16	Uganda	-	0	-	-	-				0
16	Arabian Gulf	0	-	-	-	-				0

== See also ==
- Hong Kong Sevens
- IRB Sevens World Series

Preceded by 2006 Hong Kong Sevens	Hong Kong Sevens; 2007	Succeeded by 2008 Hong Kong Sevens
