= World Rugby Sevens Series hosts =

The World Rugby Sevens Series hosts have included several countries. Nine countries currently host a leg of the SVNS. Several other countries previously hosted tournaments, most recently England, France and New Zealand, all three of which were terminated following the 2022–23 season.

== Current hosts ==
Hosts are current as of the upcoming 2025–26 series. Interruptions to events are recorded in the footnotes.

Event	Venue	City	Joined	First held at current site
(United Arab Emirates) Dubai	The Sevens	Dubai	1999–2000 (Note: The Dubai tournament was held during the 2001–02 series, but was downgraded in status and excluded from the Sevens World Series after several teams withdrew following 9/11. The tournament moved to current venue in 2008. Due to impacts of COVID-19, the event was cancelled in 2020. However, two tournaments were held in Dubai for the 2021–22 season.)	2008–09
South Africa	DHL Stadium	Cape Town	1999–2000 (Note: The South Africa tournament has been hosted at various locations since 1999. It was not held in 2020 or 2021 due to impacts of COVID-19.)	2015–16
Singapore	National Stadium	Singapore	2000–01 (Note: Singapore hosted a series event from 2001–02 through 2005–06 at the original National Stadium, except in 2002–03 when the event was canceled due to concerns about the SARS outbreak. After a ten-year hiatus, the series was hosted at the new National Stadium, constructed on the same site as the original, for the 2015–16 season. The tournament was cancelled in 2020 and 2021 due to COVID-19.)	2001–02
Australia	Perth Rectangular Stadium	Perth	1999–2000 (Note: The IRB withdrew Australia's hosting rights after the country imposed a sporting boycott of Fiji after the 2000 Fijian coup d'état. When sanctions were lifted, the remaining tournaments of Brisbane's hosting agreement were played but the country was not awarded another event for the next three seasons from 2003–04 to 2005–06. Following stints at Adelaide and the Gold Coast, the tournament went to Sydney where it was held at various venues. The tournament was cancelled in 2021 and 2022 due to impacts of COVID-19. It was held from 2016 to 2018 at the original Sydney Football Stadium, on the same site as the present stadium which has hosted the tournament since the 2022–23 season.)	2023–24
Canada	BC Place	Vancouver	2015–16 (Note: Canada hosted the only two events of the 2021 season, in Vancouver and Edmonton.)	2015–16
(United States) USA	Sports Illustrated Stadium	New York (Note: Physical location is Harrison, New Jersey.)	2003–04 (Note: The first three editions of the USA Sevens were held at The Home Depot Center (as it was then named) in the Los Angeles area. The event moved to San Diego after the 2005–06 series and still later to Las Vegas, but returned to the original venue in Los Angeles for the 2019–20 season. The tournament was not held in 2021 due to impacts of COVID-19.)	2025–26
Hong Kong	Hong Kong Stadium	Hong Kong	1999–2000 (Note: The Hong Kong Sevens was not part of the 2004–05 series, during which Hong Kong instead hosted the 2005 Rugby World Cup Sevens. The tournament was cancelled in 2020 and 2021 due to COVID-19, but hosted two tournaments in the 2022–23 series.)	1999–2000
Spain	José Zorrilla Stadium	Valladolid	2021–22	2025–26
France	Stade Atlantique	Bordeaux	1999–2000	2025–26

== Past hosts ==
=== Former hosts of current events ===
Event	Venue	City	First held	Last held
Australia	Lang Park (Note: Currently known for sponsorship reasons as Suncorp Stadium.)	Brisbane	1999–2000	
Australia	Ballymore Stadium	Brisbane	2001–02	2002–03
Australia	Adelaide Oval	Adelaide	2006–07	2010–11
Australia	Robina Stadium (Note: Currently known for sponsorship reasons as cbus Super Stadium.)	Gold Coast	2011–12	2014–15
Australia	Sydney Football Stadium (Note: This was the first Sydney Football Stadium, which occupied the site of the current stadium opened in 2022.)	Sydney	2015–16	2017–18
Australia	Sydney Showground Stadium (Note: Currently known for sponsorship reasons as GIANTS Stadium.)	Sydney	2018–19	
Australia	Bankwest Stadium	Sydney	2019–20	
Australia	Sydney Football Stadium	Sydney	2022–23	
Canada	Commonwealth Stadium	Edmonton	2021	
(United Arab Emirates) Dubai	Dubai Exiles Rugby Ground	Dubai	1999–2000	2007–08 (Note: The Dubai Sevens was held during the 2001–02 series, but downgraded from full Sevens Series status due to team withdrawals in the wake of 9/11.)
France	Stade Sébastien Charléty	Paris	1999–2000	2005–06
France	Stade Chaban-Delmas	Bordeaux	2003–04	
France	Stade Jean-Bouin	Paris	2004–05 (Note: The original Stade Jean-Bouin, which was later replaced by an entirely new stadium on the same site, hosted the series in 2004–05)	2018–19 (Note: Stade Jean-Bouin, rebuilt on the same site and opened in 2013, hosted the series from 2015–16 to 2018–19.)
France	Stade Ernest-Wallon	Toulouse	2021–22	2022–23
Hong Kong	Hong Kong Stadium	Hong Kong	1999–2000	2023–24
Singapore	National Stadium (Note: This is the first National Stadium, which occupied the site of the current National Stadium.)	Singapore	2001–02	2005–06 (Note: The Singapore Sevens was canceled in 2002–03, but was held in every other season within the listed time span.)
South Africa	Danie Craven Stadium	Stellenbosch	1999–2000	
South Africa	ABSA Stadium (Note: Currently known as Jonsson Kings Park Stadium.)	Durban	2000–01	2001–02
South Africa	Outeniqua Park	George	2002–03	2010–11
South Africa	Nelson Mandela Bay Stadium	Port Elizabeth	2011–12	2014–15
Spain	Estadio Ciudad de Málaga	Málaga	2021–2022	
Spain	Estadio La Cartuja	Seville	2021–2022	
Spain	Metropolitano Stadium	Madrid	2023–24	
(United States) USA	Petco Park	San Diego	2006–07	2008–09
(United States) USA	Sam Boyd Stadium	Las Vegas	2009–10	2018–19
(United States) USA	Dignity Health Sports Park	Los Angeles	2003–04	2024–25

=== Hosts of discontinued events ===
Event	Venue	City	Joined	Last held/Folded
Argentina	Estadio José María Minella	Mar del Plata	1999–2000	2001–02 (Note: Mar del Plata hosted the 2001 Rugby World Cup Sevens instead of a leg within the 2000–01 World Sevens Series.)
Chile	San Carlos	Santiago	2001–02	
China	Yuanshen Stadium	Shanghai	2001–02	
China	Olympic Sports Centre	Beijing	2002–03 (Note: Beijing was intended to host an event in the 2003–04 series, but it was canceled due to the SARS outbreak in China.)	
England	Twickenham	London	1999–2000	2022–23
Fiji	National Stadium	Suva	1999–2000	
Japan	Chichibunomiya Rugby Stadium	Tokyo	1999–2000	2014–15
New Zealand	Westpac Stadium	Wellington	1999–2000	2016–17
New Zealand	Waikato Stadium	Hamilton	2017–18	2022–23
Malaysia	Petaling Jaya Stadium	Kuala Lumpur	2000–01	2001–02
Scotland	Murrayfield	Edinburgh	2006–07	2010–11
Scotland	Scotstoun Stadium	Glasgow	2011–12	2014–15
Uruguay	Estadio Domingo Burgueño	Punta Del Este	1999–2000	
Wales	Cardiff Arms Park	Cardiff	2000–01	2002–03

== Tournament hosts ==
Italics indicates was cancelled

Tournament	99–00	00–01	01–02	02–03	03–04	04–05	05–06	06–07	07–08	08–09
Australia	Brisbane	~~Brisbane~~	Brisbane	Brisbane				Adelaide	Adelaide	Adelaide
(United Arab Emirates) UAE	Dubai	Dubai	~~Dubai~~	Dubai	Dubai	Dubai	Dubai	Dubai	Dubai	Dubai
South Africa	Stellenbosch	Durban	Durban	George	George	George	George	George	George	George
New Zealand	Wellington	Wellington	Wellington	Wellington	Wellington	Wellington	Wellington	Wellington	Wellington	Wellington
(United States) USA					Los Angeles	Los Angeles	Los Angeles	San Diego	San Diego	San Diego
Hong Kong	Hong Kong	Hong Kong	Hong Kong	Hong Kong	Hong Kong		Hong Kong	Hong Kong	Hong Kong	Hong Kong
England		London	London	London	London	London	London	London	London	London
Canada										
France	Paris				Bordeaux	Paris	Paris			
Singapore			Singapore	~~Singapore~~	Singapore	Singapore	Singapore			
Japan	Tokyo	Tokyo								
Scotland								Edinburgh	Edinburgh	Edinburgh
Argentina	Mar del Plata		Mar del Plata							
Wales		Cardiff	Cardiff	Cardiff						
China		Shanghai	Beijing	~~Beijing~~						
Malaysia		Kuala Lumpur	Kuala Lumpur	~~Kuala Lumpur~~						
Chile			Santiago	~~Santiago~~						
Uruguay	Punta del Este									
Fiji	Suva									
Rounds	10	9 / 10 ^{(1)}	11 / 12 ^{(2)}	7 / 11 ^{(3)}	8	7	8	8	8	8

Tournament	09–10	10–11	11–12	12–13	13–14	14–15	15–16	16–17	17–18	18–19
Australia	Adelaide	Adelaide	Gold Coast	Gold Coast	Gold Coast	Gold Coast	Sydney	Sydney	Sydney	Sydney
(United Arab Emirates) UAE	Dubai	Dubai	Dubai	Dubai	Dubai	Dubai	Dubai	Dubai	Dubai	Dubai
South Africa	George	George	Port Elizabeth	Port Elizabeth	Port Elizabeth	Port Elizabeth	Cape Town	Cape Town	Cape Town	Cape Town
New Zealand	Wellington	Wellington	Wellington	Wellington	Wellington	Wellington	Wellington	Wellington	Hamilton	Hamilton
(United States) USA	Las Vegas	Las Vegas	Las Vegas	Las Vegas	Las Vegas	Las Vegas	Las Vegas	Las Vegas	Las Vegas	Las Vegas
Hong Kong	Hong Kong	Hong Kong	Hong Kong	Hong Kong	Hong Kong	Hong Kong	Hong Kong	Hong Kong	Hong Kong	Hong Kong
England	London	London	London	London	London	London	London	London	London	London
Canada							Vancouver	Vancouver	Vancouver	Vancouver
France							Paris	Paris	Paris	Paris
Singapore							Singapore	Singapore	Singapore	Singapore
Japan			Tokyo	Tokyo	Tokyo	Tokyo				
Scotland	Edinburgh	Edinburgh	Glasgow	Glasgow	Glasgow	Glasgow				
Argentina				~~La Plata~~						
Wales										
China										
Malaysia										
Chile										
Uruguay										
Fiji										
Rounds	8	8	9	9 / 10 ^{(4)}	9	9	10	10	10	10

^{1} The 2001 Brisbane tournament was cancelled by IRB in response to the Australian Government's sporting sanctions against Fiji.
^{3} The Dubai tournament was downgraded in status and excluded from the 2001–02 series standings after several teams withdrew in the wake of the September 11 attacks in 2001.
^{3} The SARS outbreak in Asia prevented the events in Beijing, Singapore and Kuala Lumpur being played, and the Santiago event was withdrawn due to funding issues.
^{4} The schedule for the 2012–13 Series was released to the general public in late June 2012. At the time, the schedule included a new event to be held in La Plata, Argentina. However, on 16 August, the Argentine Rugby Union pulled out of hosting an event in 2012–13, citing demands associated with the country's 2012 entry into The Rugby Championship.
