= Greg Jeloudev =

Australian rugby player

- Born: 24 March 1990 (age 36)
- Height: 1.80 m (5 ft 11 in)
- Weight: 88 kg (194 lb; 13 st 12 lb)

Rugby union career
Senior career
Years	Team	Apps	(Points)
2013-2017	Sydney University	39	(165)
National sevens team
Years	Team		Comps
2010-2015	Australia 7s		

Greg Jeloudev (born 24 March 1990) is a professional Rugby Union player. He represents Australia in Sevens Rugby. Born in Sydney, NSW and playing for Sydney University at a club level, he debuted for Australia in November 2010. As of December 2015, he currently has 32 caps.

Jeloudev conjoined the Australian Sevens for the 2010–11 IRB Sevens World Series where he played in all eight rounds in Dubai, George, Wellington, Las Vegas, Hong Kong, Adelaide, London and Edinburgh. Greg starred for Sydney University in the 2013 Shute Shield tournament where by Round 16 he became 1st Grade's leading point's scorer with 13 tries/65 points. At the conclusion of the 2014/15 World Series, Jeloudev went back to play Sydney University in the 2015 Shute Shield. Representative honours include representing NSW Schools and Australia A Schoolboys in 2008, Australian U20s in 2010 and the Commonwealth Games in 2014.
