= Declan O'Donnell =

New Zealand Māori international rugby union player

- Born: Declan Patrick Te Kahui O'Donnell; 28 November 1990 (age 35) Thames Valley, New Zealand
- Height: 1.88 m (6 ft 2 in)
- Weight: 94 kg (207 lb)
- School: Hamilton Boys' High School

Rugby union career
- Position: Wing
Senior career
Years	Team	Apps	(Points)
2020–	Old Glory DC	3	(5)
- Correct as of 14 July 2018
Provincial / State sides
Years	Team	Apps	(Points)
2011–2015	Waikato	29	(40)
2016–2019	Taranaki	20	(30)
Super Rugby
Years	Team	Apps	(Points)
2012	Chiefs	1	(0)
2013	Highlanders	0	(0)
2017	Blues	2	(0)
2018	Chiefs	2	(0)
International career
Years	Team	Apps	(Points)
2012	Māori All Blacks	1	(5)
- Correct as of 13 June 2017
National sevens team
Years	Team		Comps
2010–2016	New Zealand		6
- Correct as of 7 July 2016

Declan O'Donnell is a New Zealand international rugby sevens player. He made his World Series debut in the 2010–11 season, and became an overnight sensation after he scored three tries for New Zealand during the final of the 2011 Wellington Sevens against England. O'Donnell made his Super Rugby debut for the Chiefs in 2012, but was delisted at the end of the season, and joined the Dunedin-based Highlanders in 2013.

== Early life ==
O'Donnell is from Waikato. He is of mixed Irish-Maori descent he affiliates to Ngāti Tuwharetoa and Ngāti Porou iwi. O'Donnell attended Hamilton Boys' High School, where the first match he recalls playing was for Hamilton and against arch rival Kelston High School.

== Career ==
O’Donnell was discovered by New Zealand head coach Gordon Tietjens playing in a local tournament in Te Rapa. Tietjens had tagged him as an "emerging player". Within weeks of his discovery, he was on the main squad. O'Donnell made his debut for New Zealand sevens team in the 2010 Dubai Sevens. After the first three legs of his debut season, O'Donnell had already scored 17 tournament tries. His hat-trick in the final of the NZI Sevens made him an instant national hero, and put him jointly as top try scorers for the 2010–11 season along with South Africa's Cecil Afrika and Fiji's Seremaia Burotu.

O'Donnell made his ITM Cup debut for Waikato in 2011, and was signed by the Chiefs in 2012. After making only one appearance with the side, he made the decision to sign with the Highlanders for the 2013 season.

At the latter part of 2012 O'Donnell joined the Maori AllBlacks tour, after impressing at ITM Cup level for Waikato. His pace and skills would have been a welcomed addition to the Highlanders' squad for the upcoming season. However, he suffered a shoulder injury in Highlanders preseason which required a shoulder reconstruction surgery, which meant no rugby for the remainder of 2013.

In 2020, O’Donnell moved to the United States to play for Old Glory DC in Major League Rugby.

== Legal ==
O'Donnell was involved in an assault involving two doormen at the Outback Inn, Hamilton, after his brother was beaten by the doormen earlier on, during January 2011. O’Donnell pled guilty in June 2011 to common assault. The charges against him were later reduced, meaning no conviction was recorded. The bouncer was later convicted of assault after it was revealed he had kicked O’Donnell's brother in the face during the initial altercation.
