= Bernado Botha =

South African rugby union player

- Full name: Bernado Carl Botha
- Born: 4 July 1988 (age 38) Oudtshoorn, South Africa
- Height: 1.80 m (5 ft 11 in)
- Weight: 100 kg (220 lb; 15 st 10 lb)
- School: Hoërskool Florida, Roodepoort
- University: University of Johannesburg

Rugby union career
- Position: Winger
Youth career
- 2004: SWD Eagles
- 2006–2009: Golden Lions
Amateur team(s)
Years	Team	Apps	(Points)
2008	UJ	10	(20)
Senior career
Years	Team	Apps	(Points)
2009–2010	Golden Lions XV	8	(20)
2010	Lions	2	(0)
2013	Griffons	5	(0)
2014–2017	Pumas	39	(42)
2018	Batumi RC		
2018	Boland Cavaliers	4	(0)
- Correct as of 27 October 2018
International career
Years	Team	Apps	(Points)
2007	South Africa Under-19		
2010–2013	South Africa Sevens		
- Correct as of 28 March 2014
Medal record
Men's rugby sevens
Representing South Africa
World Games
Gold medal – first place	2013 Cali	Team competition
Commonwealth Games
Bronze medal – third place	2010 Delhi	Team competition

Bernado Carl Botha (born 4 July 1988) is a South African professional rugby union player who last played for the Boland Cavaliers in the Currie Cup. He has been playing first class rugby since 2009 and was a regular member of the South Africa Sevens team between 2010 and 2013. His regular position is winger or fullback.

== Career ==
=== Youth and Varsity rugby ===
Botha represented South Western Districts at the 2004 Under-16 Grant Khomo Week. He then moved to Gauteng and was included in the Golden Lions squad for the 2006 Under-18 Craven Week tournament. The following year, he received a call-up to the South African Under-19 squad for the 2007 Under 19 Rugby World Championship in Ireland.

He continued to represent the Golden Lions at youth level, playing for their Under-19s in national championships in 2007 and for the Under-21s in 2008 and 2009. He also played for UJ in the 2008 and 2010 Varsity Cup competitions, scoring four tries in eight appearances.

=== Senior career ===
Botha was included in the Golden Lions squad for the 2008 Vodacom Cup competition, but failed to make an appearance, despite being named as a substitute for their match against the Natal Wildebeest.

Once again named in their Vodacom Cup squad in 2009, Botha duly made his first class debut by starting in their match against the Pumas in Randfontein. He made seven starts in total and weighed in with four tries during that tournament.

Following two more appearances in the 2010 Vodacom Cup, Botha was then included in the Lions squad for the 2010 Super 14 season. He made two substitute appearances, against the Force in Johannesburg and against the Cheetahs in Welkom.

=== Sevens rugby ===
In 2010, Botha joined the South African Sevens squad and appeared in the Dubai and South African legs of the 2010–11 IRB Sevens World Series. In October 2011, he signed a two-year deal with the South African Rugby Union to represent the sevens side and became a regular for them in the 2011–12 and 2012–13 seasons of the IRB Sevens World Series.

=== Griffons ===
At the conclusion of the 2012–13 IRB Sevens World Series, Botha made a return to fifteens rugby and made five appearances for Welkom-based side Griffons during the 2013 Currie Cup First Division.

=== Pumas ===
He then joined the Pumas prior to the 2014 Vodacom Cup competition. He was a member of the Pumas side that won the Vodacom Cup for the first time in 2015, beating Western Province 24–7 in the final. Botha made eight appearances during the season.

=== Batumi ===
He joined Georgian Didi 10 side Batumi for the 2017–18 season.
