= London Sevens =

Rugby sevens tournament held in London, England

- Sport: Rugby sevens
- Inaugural season: 2001
- Holders: Argentina (2023)
- Most titles: New Zealand (5 times)

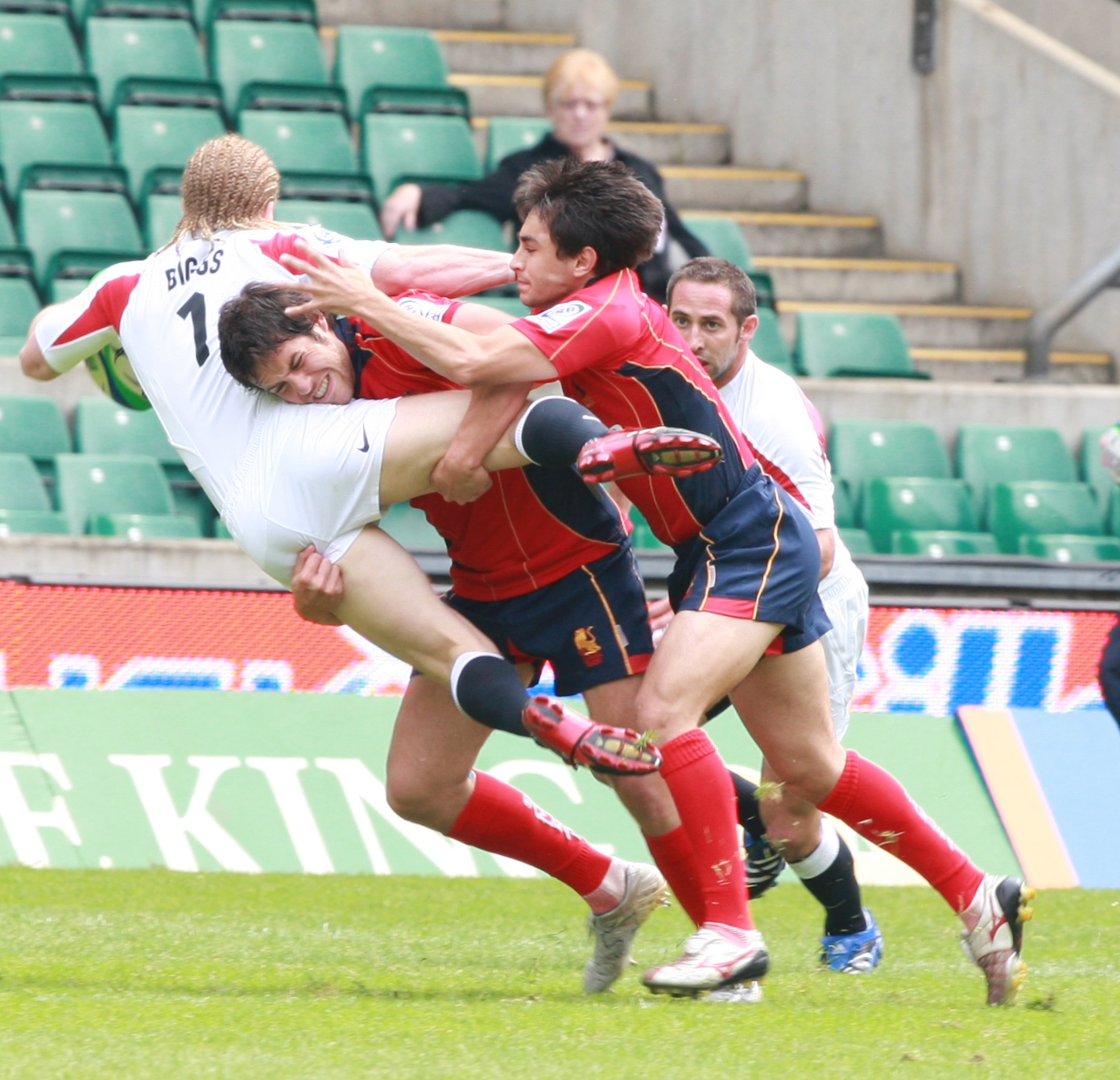
England playing Spain at the 2008 London Sevens,

The London Sevens is an annual rugby sevens tournament held at Twickenham Stadium in London. It is part of the World Rugby Sevens Series. London was added to the World Series for the first time in 2001. For many years the London Sevens was the last tournament of each season but the Paris Sevens became the last stop on the calendar in 2018. The current titleholder of the London Sevens are Australia, who beat New Zealand in the 2022 final.

The London Sevens is one of the more popular stops on the World Series. The 2011 London Sevens set a single-day attendance record of over 54,000 fans, surpassing the attendance record set by the Dubai Sevens. The tournament has also drawn over 100,000 fans over the course of the weekend, making it one of the largest attended recurring events on the Twickenham stadium calendar.

== 2013 qualifier ==
Uniquely, the 2013 edition was not only the final event in the series, but also incorporated the World Series Core Team Qualifier. In Sevens Series terminology, "core teams" are those that are guaranteed a place in all series events in a given season. Unlike all other series events, the 2013 London Sevens had only 12 teams competing for series points, namely the top 12 core teams on the season points table following the season's penultimate tournament, the Scotland Sevens. The Core Team Qualifier involved eight teams—the winner of the HSBC Asian Sevens Series; four teams advancing from the World Series Pre-Qualifier, held as part of the Hong Kong Sevens; and the three core teams at the bottom of the season table after the Scotland Sevens. The top three teams at the end of the Core Team Qualifier became core teams for the next season.

World Rugby, then known as the International Rugby Board, chose to change its core team qualifying process in advance of the 2013–14 series, reducing the number of promotion/relegation places from three to one, and also using only the Hong Kong Sevens for the core team qualifier. Accordingly, the London Sevens returned to its traditional 16-team format from 2014 forward.

== Results by year ==
Year	Venue	Cup final			Placings		
		Winner	Score	Runner-up	Plate	Bowl	Shield
2001	Twickenham	New Zealand	19–12	Australia	South Africa	Wales	–
2002	Twickenham	New Zealand	54–14	South Africa	Australia	France	Georgia
2003	Twickenham	England	31–24	Fiji	Australia	Samoa	Argentina
2004	Twickenham	England	22–19	New Zealand	South Africa	France	Portugal
2005	Twickenham	South Africa	21–12	England	Fiji	Samoa	Canada
2006	Twickenham	Fiji	54–14	South Africa	Australia	Portugal	Italy
2007	Twickenham	New Zealand	29–7	Fiji	South Africa	England	Kenya
2008	Twickenham	Samoa	19–14	Fiji	New Zealand	Australia	Spain
2009	Twickenham	England	26–7	New Zealand	Fiji	Kenya	Canada
2010	Twickenham	Australia	19–14	South Africa	New Zealand	Canada	Kenya
2011	Twickenham	South Africa	24–14	Fiji	Samoa	Scotland	England
2012	Twickenham	Fiji	38–15	Samoa	New Zealand	Australia	Wales
2013	Twickenham	New Zealand	47–12	Australia	England	Fiji	Wales
2014	Twickenham	New Zealand	52–33	Australia	South Africa	Canada	United States
2015	Twickenham	United States	45–22	Australia	New Zealand	Kenya	Japan
2016	Twickenham	Scotland	27–26	South Africa	New Zealand	Wales	Kenya
		Winner	Score	Runner-up	Third	Fourth	Fifth
2017	Twickenham	Scotland	12–7	England	Canada	United States	South Africa
2018	Twickenham	Fiji	21–17	South Africa	Ireland	England	New Zealand
2019	Twickenham	Fiji	43–7	Australia	United States	France	New Zealand
World Series tournaments planned for London were cancelled in 2020 and 2021, due to impacts of the COVID-19 pandemic.
2022	Twickenham	Australia	^{19–14}_{^{(a.e.t.)}}	New Zealand	Fiji	Samoa	South Africa
2023	Twickenham	Argentina	35–14	Fiji	Samoa	New Zealand	France

== Multiple winners ==
The teams that have won the tournament, as part of the World Rugby Sevens Series, on multiple occasions are:

Team	Titles	Years
New Zealand	5	2001, 2002, 2007, 2013, 2014
Fiji	4	2006, 2012, 2018, 2019
England	3	2003, 2004, 2009
Australia	2	2010, 2022
Scotland	2	2016, 2017
South Africa	2	2005, 2011

== See also ==
- London Women's Sevens — This event was held in 2012, 2013, and 2015.
