= USA Sevens =

American rugby sevens tournament

- Most recent season or competition: 2026 USA Sevens
- Sport: Rugby sevens
- Founded: 2004
- No. of teams: 8
- Country: United States
- Most recent champion: South Africa
- Most titles: South Africa (7 titles)
- Broadcaster: Peacock
- Website: SVNS New York

The USA Sevens is a rugby sevens tournament held annually during March in the United States. The USA Sevens was the largest annual rugby competition in North America, having drawn over 80,000 fans to events; however recent events have garnered lower attendances.

The USA Sevens was introduced in 2004, originally in the Los Angeles suburb of Carson, California. The event moved to San Diego in 2007, and from there moved to Sam Boyd Stadium in Las Vegas in 2010. It then spent the entire decade of the 2010s in Las Vegas before returning to Carson in 2020. The USA Sevens tournament features 8 international teams. The USA Sevens is one of several tournaments on the World Rugby Sevens Series.

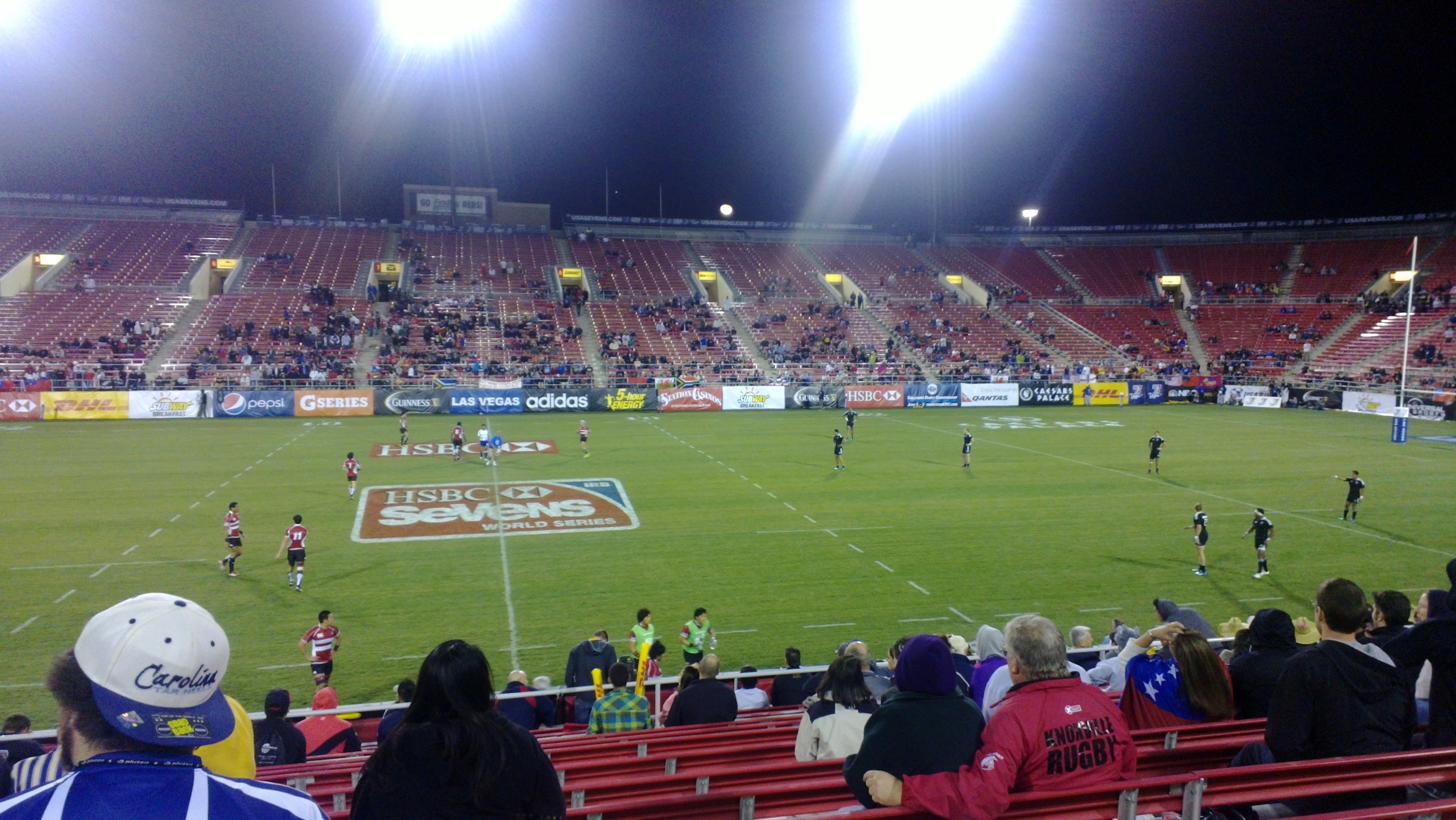
Japan plays New Zealand in the 2012 USA Sevens tournament

== Format ==
The most recent tournament consisted only of the top 8 countries participating in matches over a two-day weekend. The 8 teams were divided into two pools of four teams, with seeding determined by finishes in the previous competition in the Sevens World Series. Wins are worth three points, draws two, and losses one.

Through the 2011–12 edition, the sixteen participating teams were the 12 "core" members of the Sevens World Series circuit, along with 4 additional qualifying teams—other teams that qualified multiple times during the 2009–2012 span included Japan, Canada, Uruguay and Guyana. Starting with the 2012–13 season, the number of core teams increased from 12 to 15, with Canada, Spain and Portugal earning the three new slots.

== History ==
The USA Sevens tournament has been a part of the World Rugby Sevens Series every year since its 2004 debut. This makes the USA Sevens tournament one of the longer running consecutive hosts on the circuit.

The USA Sevens debuted at the Home Depot Center, now known as Dignity Health Sports Park, in the Los Angeles suburb of Carson, California in February 2004. This competition marked the first time the United States ever hosted an official IRB event of international importance. USA Rugby was awarded the right to host the USA Sevens for three years, in part because rugby was recognized as one of the fastest growing team sports in the U.S.

In 2005, USA Rugby sold a 90% interest in USA Sevens, LLC to American International Media, LLC, with USA Rugby retaining the remaining 10% ownership interest. In August 2006, USA Rugby and the International Rugby Board renewed the contract for the USA Sevens to remain in the IRB Sevens World Series.

The USA Sevens tournament was held from 2007 to 2009 in San Diego at Petco Park, the home field of the San Diego Padres of Major League Baseball. San Diego was an appealing location because the average high temperature in San Diego in February is a balmy 72 °F (22 °C).

Las Vegas then won the right to host the annual event beginning in 2010, beating out competition from San Francisco, Phoenix, and Orlando. In 2015, World Rugby reached an agreement with USA Rugby and with the tournament's organizers: World Rugby would continue to place the USA Sevens tournament in Las Vegas if the tournament organizers agreed to widen the field at Sam Boyd Stadium and install approved artificial turf.

The USA Sevens was a financial success during its run in Las Vegas, partly because its venue of Sam Boyd Stadium was surrounded by playing fields. This allowed the complex to host the Las Vegas Invitational, a major rugby union event involving club, school, and university teams, alongside the USA Sevens. During the USA Sevens' run in Las Vegas, the entry fee for the Invitational has included tickets to the USA Sevens, providing a large built-in attendance base.

In 2017, the Oakland Raiders were given permission by the NFL to relocate to Las Vegas, with the team to play in a new 60,000-capacity stadium on a plot of derelict land near the Las Vegas Strip. Due to the fact that $750 million of the construction costs was expected to come in the form of public funding, a deal was thrashed out to allow the UNLV Rebels football team of the local University of Nevada, Las Vegas to move in as co-tenants of the new stadium. This meant that Sam Boyd Stadium faces an uncertain future with multiple sources suggesting that it would be demolished. In March 2018, United World Sports CEO Jon Prusmack stated his intention on initiating talks with the Raiders over the next few months to allow the USA Sevens to use the new Raiders stadium for future tournaments.

In January 2019, The Province, the main newspaper in Vancouver, reported that the then-upcoming 2019 USA Sevens would be the last in Las Vegas, at least for the immediate future. At the time, World Rugby was preparing to announce the hosts for the Sevens Series events for its next four-year cycle, starting with 2019–20 and running through 2022–23. Reasons cited were stadium issues and poor living environment at the team hotels. Possible options were a return to San Diego, or moves to San Francisco (which hosted the 2018 Rugby World Cup Sevens) or Miami. WR ultimately announced that the event would return to its original home of Dignity Health Sports Park for at least the 2020 event.

Apart from the uncertain future of Sam Boyd Stadium, its playing field had been the source of many issues. During the first years of the event's run in Las Vegas, the stadium's standard artificial pitch was used, leading to many safety-related concerns. Some of these concerns were alleviated with the installation of temporary grass surfaces for the 2017–2019 events, but other safety issues inherent to the stadium's design remained. Sam Boyd Stadium was built for American football, a sport with a playing field (including the end zones) that is approximately the same length as a standard rugby pitch but is nearly 20 meters narrower. Because of this, the pitch in Las Vegas was noticeably narrower than at other series stops, with team benches unusually close to the touchlines.

== Popularity and growth ==
The USA Sevens is the second largest annual rugby competition in North America after the Canada Sevens in Vancouver. The tournament has grown in popularity since the tournament began in 2004. In recent years, a number of events have accelerated the surge in popularity, including the announcement in 2009 that rugby would return to the Summer Olympics, the general growth of rugby in the United States, the improved performance of the U.S. national rugby team including their success in reaching the semi-finals of the 2009 USA Sevens, and NBC's decision to begin televising the tournament beginning in 2011.

=== Attendance ===
Tournament attendance has grown rapidly since its inception in 2004. The tournament drew 15,800 fans in 2004, 29,992 fans in 2007, 35,773 in 2008, and 35,543 fans in 2009.

The tournament switched to a three-day format in 2011. The 2012 tournament's second-day attendance of 30,112 set a new record for the largest crowd to watch a rugby event in the United States. The 2013 tournament broke attendance records again, with total attendance of 67,341. The 2014 tournament again saw record attendance, with 68,608 fans, despite the fact that the tournament had been moved to January to avoid the 2014 Winter Olympics. In 2026, USA Sevens moved to Harrison, New Jersey, drawing a series-low 12,550 fans.

Tournament attendance by year
Year	Total Attendance	Daily Average	Highest Day	Tournament Days	Location	Ref
2004	15,800	7,900		2	Home Depot Center, Carson, California	
2005				2	Home Depot Center, Carson, California	
2006				2	Home Depot Center, Carson, California	
2007	29,992	14,996		2	Petco Park, San Diego, California	
2008	35,773	17,887		2	Petco Park, San Diego, California	
2009	35,543	17,772		2	Petco Park, San Diego, California	
2010	36,600	18,300		2	Sam Boyd Stadium, Las Vegas, Nevada	
2011	49,909	24,955		2	Sam Boyd Stadium, Las Vegas, Nevada	
2012	64,551	21,517	30,112	3	Sam Boyd Stadium, Las Vegas, Nevada	
2013	67,341	22,447	31,228	3	Sam Boyd Stadium, Las Vegas, Nevada	
2014	68,608	22,869	31,664	3	Sam Boyd Stadium, Las Vegas, Nevada	
2015	75,761	25,254	34,593	3	Sam Boyd Stadium, Las Vegas, Nevada	
2016	80,138	26,713	35,716	3	Sam Boyd Stadium, Las Vegas, Nevada	
2017	80,691	26,897	35,901	3	Sam Boyd Stadium, Las Vegas, Nevada	
2018*	65,000	21,667	30,000	3	Sam Boyd Stadium, Las Vegas, Nevada	
2019				3	Sam Boyd Stadium, Las Vegas, Nevada	
2020	31,257	15,629	17,436	2	Dignity Health Sports Park, Carson, California	
2021	No tournament held due to Covid-19					
2022	30,654	15,327	16,356	2	Dignity Health Sports Park, Carson, California	
2023				2	Dignity Health Sports Park, Carson, California	
2024				3	Dignity Health Sports Park, Carson, California	
2025	27,000	13,500		2	Dignity Health Sports Park, Carson, California	
2026	12,550	6,275		2	Sports Illustrated Stadium, Harrison, New Jersey	
*The Rugby World Cup Sevens was held in San Francisco this year.

Key
Record high
Record low

=== Media coverage ===
The profile and visibility of the USA Sevens has increased in the United States since NBC began broadcasting the tournament in 2011, marking the first time that the tournament had live television coverage on network TV in the United States. NBC Sports and Universal Sports broadcast eight hours of live coverage of the 2011 tournament, including 4 hours of coverage on NBC. NBC increased its television coverage for the 2012 tournament, showing 10 hours of live coverage, including 4 hours on NBC and 4 hours on NBC Sports. The 2012 USA Sevens earned strong ratings of 0.7 on NBC, beating other popular sports events that weekend such as the Detroit v. Philadelphia NHL game (0.4) and the Alabama v. LSU basketball game (0.3). NBC again increased its TV coverage in 2013, with 16 hours of coverage across three channels, including 4 hours on NBC and 6 hours on NBC Sports. The 2014 USA Sevens drew ratings of 0.7 on Saturday and 1.0 on Sunday. The 2016 USA Sevens had 7 hours of TV coverage across NBCSN and NBC, but only 1 hour on NBC.

NBC Sports has displayed an increased interest in broadcasting rugby since the International Olympic Committee's announcement in 2009 that rugby would return to the Summer Olympics in 2016. NBC Sports has recognized that its partnership with USA Sevens to broadcast the tournament will help grow the sport of rugby in the United States.

=== Sponsors ===
Fueled in part by the publicity generated by the NBC broadcasts and rugby's return to the Olympics, the USA Sevens has been successful in lining up several blue-chip corporate sponsors. For the 2011 tournament, sponsors included Bridgestone, Toyota, Subway and ADT. The tournament was similarly successful in landing commercial sponsors for 2012, including Adidas, Pepsi, DHL, Subway and others.

Effective with the 2010–11 series, the London-based global financial services company HSBC became the title sponsor of the overall IRB Sevens World Series.

== Results ==
=== Results by year ===
Year	Host	Cup Final			Placings		
Year	Host	Winner	Score	Runner-up	Plate	Bowl	Shield
2004	Los Angeles, CA	Argentina	21–12	New Zealand	England	Australia	United States
2005	Los Angeles	New Zealand	34–5	Argentina	Fiji	Canada	Tonga
2006	Los Angeles	England	38–5	Fiji	Argentina	Scotland	Kenya
2007	San Diego	Fiji	38–24	Samoa	South Africa	Tonga	United States
2008	San Diego	New Zealand	27–12	South Africa	Fiji	Wales	Australia
2009	San Diego	Argentina	19–14	England	New Zealand	Australia	Canada
2010	Las Vegas	Samoa	33–12	New Zealand	South Africa	United States	Scotland
2011	Las Vegas	South Africa	24–14	Fiji	Samoa	Scotland	United States
2012	Las Vegas	Samoa	26–19	New Zealand	Kenya	Canada	France
2013	Las Vegas	South Africa	40–21	New Zealand	Canada	France	Australia
2014	Las Vegas	South Africa	14–7	New Zealand	England	Fiji	United States
2015	Las Vegas	Fiji	35–19	New Zealand	South Africa	Kenya	Portugal
2016	Las Vegas	Fiji	21–15	Australia	New Zealand	Wales	Samoa
		Winner	Score	Runner-up	Third	Fourth	Fifth
2017	Las Vegas	South Africa	19–12	Fiji	United States	New Zealand	England
2018	Las Vegas	United States	28–0	Argentina	Fiji	South Africa	New Zealand
2019	Las Vegas	United States	27–0	Samoa	New Zealand	Argentina	England
2020	Los Angeles	South Africa	^{29–24}_{^{(a.e.t.)}}	Fiji	New Zealand	Australia	United States
The World Series tournament planned for Los Angeles was cancelled in 2021 due to impacts of the COVID-19 pandemic
2022	Los Angeles	New Zealand	28–21	Fiji	Australia	Samoa	Argentina
2023	Los Angeles	New Zealand	22–12	Argentina	Fiji	Australia	Samoa
2024	Los Angeles	France	21–0	Great Britain	Ireland	Spain	Argentina
2025	Los Angeles	South Africa	19–5	Spain	New Zealand	Argentina	France
2026	New York	South Africa	10–7	Fiji	Argentina	Australia	France

Sources: USA Sevens, Rugby7

=== Results by team ===
Updated as of the 2025 tournament:

Team	Champions	Runners-up	Semifinalists
South Africa	2011, 2013, 2014, 2017, 2020, 2025, 2026	2008	2009, 2012, 2015, 2016, 2018
New Zealand	2005, 2008, 2022, 2023	2004, 2010, 2012, 2013, 2014, 2015	2007, 2011, 2017, 2019, 2020, 2025
Fiji	2007, 2015, 2016	2006, 2011, 2017, 2020, 2022, 2026	2012, 2013, 2018, 2023
Argentina	2004, 2009	2005, 2018, 2023	2019, 2025, 2026
Samoa	2010, 2012	2007, 2019	2008, 2013, 2014, 2022
United States	2018, 2019		2009, 2015, 2016, 2017
England	2006	2009	2005, 2011
France	2024		2007
Australia		2016	2010, 2020, 2022, 2023, 2026
Great Britain		2024	
Kenya			2008, 2010
Canada			2014
Ireland			2024
Spain			2024, 2025

=== Leading scorers ===
Leading Tournament Scorers
Season	Tries	Points
2004		
2005	8 – (New Zealand) Tafai Ioasa	61 – (New Zealand) Orene Ai'i
2006	9 – (England) David Strettle	59 – (England) Ben Gollings
2007	6 – several players tied	56 – (Fiji) William Ryder
2008	8 – (United States) Chris Wyles & (New Zealand) Victor Vito	51 – (England) Ben Gollings
2009	8 – (New Zealand) Viliame Waqaseduadua	48 – (Fiji) Peni Rokodiva
2010	11 – (Samoa) Mikaele Pesamino	55 – (Samoa) Mikaele Pesamino
2011	10 – (Kenya) Collins Injera	54 – (South Africa) Cecil Afrika
2012	7 – (South Africa) Cecil Afrika	44 – (New Zealand) Tomasi Cama
2013	8 – (Australia) Lewis Holland	52 – (Australia) Lewis Holland
2014	6 – (South Africa) Seabelo Senatla	48 – (Australia) Cameron Clark
2015	7 – (Fiji) Savenaca Rawaca	
2016	11 – (South Africa) Seabelo Senatla	
2017	7 – (Australia) Lachie Anderson	39 – (Wales) Ethan Davies
2018	8 – (United States) Perry Baker	45 – (Canada) Nathan Hirayama
2019	8 – (United States) Carlin Isles	53 – (Canada) Nathan Hirayama
2020	7 – (Scotland) Alec Coombes & (Argentina) Marcos Moneta	53 – (Fiji) Napolioni Bolaca
2022		
2023		
2024		

== See also ==
- World Rugby Sevens Series
- Sports in Las Vegas
- USA Women's Sevens
- Rugby union in the United States
- United States national rugby sevens team
- Canada Sevens
