= 2011 London Sevens =

Season of sporting fixture

- Host nation: England
- Date: May 21 – 22, 2011

Cup
- Champion: South Africa
- Runner-up: Fiji

Plate
- Winner: Samoa
- Runner-up: Australia

Bowl
- Winner: Scotland
- Runner-up: Kenya

Shield
- Winner: England
- Runner-up: Portugal

Tournament details
- Attendance: 100,094

The 2011 London Sevens was a rugby union sevens tournament, part of the 2010–11 IRB Sevens World Series. The competition was held from May 21–22 at Twickenham Stadium in England and featured 16 teams.

South Africa won the Cup competition for their second Cup win on the season. New Zealand clinched the season title after advancing to the Cup semi-finals while their nearest competition going into London, England, fell into the Shield competition and earned no series points.

== Format ==
The tournament consisted of four round-robin pools of four teams. All sixteen teams progressed to the knockout stage. The top two teams from each group progressed to quarter-finals in the main competition, with the winners of those quarter-finals competing in cup semi-finals and the losers competing in plate semi-finals. The bottom two teams from each group progressed to quarter-finals in the consolation competition, with the winners of those quarter-finals competing in bowl semi-finals and the losers competing in shield semi-finals.

== Teams ==
The following teams participated:

- Argentina
- Australia
- Canada
- England
- Fiji
- France
- Kenya
- New Zealand
- Portugal
- Russia
- Samoa
- Scotland
- South Africa
- Spain
- United States
- Wales

== Pool stage ==
Key to colours in group tables
Teams that advanced to the Cup Quarter Final

=== Pool A ===
Team	Pld	W	D	L	PF	PA	+/-	Pts
New Zealand	3	3	0	0	99	31	+68	9
Wales	3	2	0	1	74	53	+21	7
Spain	3	1	0	2	34	80	−46	5
Kenya	3	0	0	3	31	74	−43	3

Date	Team 1	Score	Team 2
2011-05-21	New Zealand	28 – 12	Kenya
2011-05-21	Wales	33 – 10	Spain
2011-05-21	New Zealand	40 – 7	Spain
2011-05-21	Wales	29 – 12	Kenya
2011-05-21	Kenya	7 – 17	Spain
2011-05-21	New Zealand	31 – 12	Wales

=== Pool B ===
Team	Pld	W	D	L	PF	PA	+/-	Pts
France	3	2	0	1	60	59	+1	7
Argentina	3	1	1	1	61	49	+12	6
England	3	1	1	1	57	54	+3	6
United States	3	1	0	2	60	76	−16	5

Date	Team 1	Score	Team 2
2011-05-21	England	31 – 21	United States
2011-05-21	Argentina	28 – 15	France
2011-05-21	England	14 – 21	France
2011-05-21	Argentina	21 – 22	United States
2011-05-21	United States	17 – 24	France
2011-05-21	England	12 – 12	Argentina

=== Pool C ===
Team	Pld	W	D	L	PF	PA	+/-	Pts
Australia	3	3	0	0	64	55	+9	9
Samoa	3	2	0	1	77	60	+17	7
Canada	3	1	0	2	63	69	−6	5
Scotland	3	0	0	3	48	68	−20	3

Date	Team 1	Score	Team 2
2011-05-21	Samoa	19 – 15	Scotland
2011-05-21	Australia	19 – 14	Canada
2011-05-21	Samoa	38 – 24	Canada
2011-05-21	Australia	24 – 21	Scotland
2011-05-21	Scotland	12 – 25	Canada
2011-05-21	Samoa	20 – 21	Australia

=== Pool D ===
Team	Pld	W	D	L	PF	PA	+/-	Pts
Fiji	3	3	0	0	77	28	+49	9
South Africa	3	2	0	1	46	26	+20	7
Portugal	3	0	1	2	40	58	−18	4
Russia	3	0	1	2	19	70	−51	4

Date	Team 1	Score	Team 2
2011-05-21	South Africa	17 – 7	Russia
2011-05-21	Fiji	24 – 21	Portugal
2011-05-21	South Africa	22 – 7	Portugal
2011-05-21	Fiji	41 – 0	Russia
2011-05-21	Russia	12 – 12	Portugal
2011-05-21	South Africa	7 – 12	Fiji

== Knockout stage ==
=== Shield ===
Quarter-finals
May 22 – London
Spain	14
United States	0
May 22 – London
Portugal	0
Scotland	26
May 22 – London
Canada	12
Russia	15
May 22 – London
England	17
Kenya	19

Semi-finals
May 22 – London
United States	15
Portugal	21
May 22 – London
Canada	14
England	22

Final
May 22 – London
Portugal	7
England	22

=== Bowl ===
Quarter-finals
May 22 – London
Spain	14
United States	0
May 22 – London
Portugal	0
Scotland	26
May 22 – London
Canada	12
Russia	15
May 22 – London
England	17
Kenya	19

Semi-finals
May 22 – London
Spain	17
Scotland	19
May 22 – London
Russia	15
Kenya	19

Final
May 22 – London
Scotland	21
Kenya	19

=== Plate ===
Quarter-finals
May 22 – London
New Zealand	31
Argentina	14
May 22 – London
Fiji	26
Samoa	14
May 22 – London
Australia	0
South Africa	17
May 22 – London
France	12
Wales	19

Semi-finals
May 22 – London
Argentina	0
Samoa	38
May 22 – London
Australia	19
France	0

Final
May 22 – London
Samoa	22
Australia	12

=== Cup ===
Quarter-finals
May 22 – London
New Zealand	31
Argentina	14
May 22 – London
Fiji	26
Samoa	14
May 22 – London
Australia	0
South Africa	17
May 22 – London
France	12
Wales	19

Semi-finals
May 22 – London
New Zealand	19
Fiji	42
May 22 – London
South Africa	21
Wales	19

Final
May 22 – London
Fiji	14
South Africa	24

== Statistics ==
Points scored by one player

Number	Player	Team	Points
1	Tom Iosefo	Samoa	50
2	Metuisela Talebula	Fiji	48
3	Tomasi Cama	New Zealand	47
4	Dan Norton	England	40
5	Ben Gollings	England	38
6	Peter Horne	Scotland	36
7	Bernado Botha	South Africa	30
8	Gonzalo Gutierrez Taboada	Argentina	30
9	Alatasi Tupou	Samoa	29
10	Cecil Afrika	South Africa	28
10	Pedro Leal	Portugal	28

Preceded by Adelaide Sevens	London Sevens; 2011	Succeeded by Edinburgh Sevens
