= Cecil Afrika =

South African rugby union player

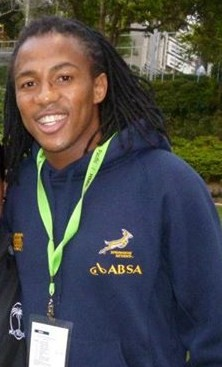
- Afrika in 2012
- Full name: Cecil Sebastian Afrika
- Born: 3 March 1988 (age 38) Port Elizabeth, South Africa
- Height: 1.77 m (5 ft 9 1/2 in)
- Weight: 65 kg (143 lb; 10 st 3 lb)
- School: Hentie Cilliers, Virginia

Rugby union career
- Position: Fullback
- Current team: South Africa Sevens
Youth career
- 2004–2007: Griffons
Senior career
Years	Team	Apps	(Points)
2006–2009	Griffons	48	(187)
2017	Free State XV	1	(0)
2017	Free State Cheetahs	4	(10)
2017	Cheetahs	2	(0)
2021–	San Diego Legion	15	(19)
- Correct as of 15 July 2021
International career
Years	Team	Apps	(Points)
2006	South Africa Schools		
2008	South Africa Under-20	4	(5)
2009–2020	South Africa Sevens	345	(1,462)
- Correct as of 23 April 2021
Coaching career
- Years: Team
- 2023–2024: South Africa 7s (technical coach)
- 2025–: South Africa 7s
Medal record
Men's rugby sevens
Representing South Africa
Olympic Games
Bronze medal – third place	2016 Rio de Janeiro	Team competition
Commonwealth Games
Gold medal – first place	2014 Glasgow	Team competition

Cecil Sebastian Afrika (born 3 March 1988) is a South African rugby sevens player for the South Africa national team, where he former player at flyhalf, and currently a coach. He also plays for the San Diego Legion of Major League Rugby (MLR).

Afrika was a member of the South African Sevens team that won a bronze medal at the 2016 Summer Olympics.

== Early life ==
Afrika attended Hentie Cilliers High School in Virginia. Afrika represented the South African Schoolboys in 2006. He was part of the South African under-20 squad in the 2008 IRB Junior World Championship that reached the third place playoffs.

== National Sevens Team Summary ==
Afrika debuted for the South African sevens team during the Dubai leg of the 2009–10 IRB Sevens World Series. During the Las Vegas leg of the 2009–10 IRB Sevens World Series he was carried off the field on a stretcher after he was injured during the Plate Final match against Fiji, South Africa won 12–7. He was part of the sevens team that took Bronze at the 2010 Commonwealth Games held in Delhi, India in October.

Afrika missed out on the 2011 Wellington Sevens because of a broken jaw he suffered during the South African leg of the IRB Sevens Series. He was the top try and point-scorer for the 2010–11 IRB Sevens World Series; He scored 40 tries throughout the series with a total of 385 points. In 2011 he won the IRB International Sevens Player of the Year award, pipping the great Tomasi Cama of New Zealand (NZ) who managed 299 points for the same year.

In 2013, Afrika was included in the squad for the 2013 Rugby World Cup Sevens.

=== 2010 Commonwealth Games - Delhi ===
Afrika was instrumental in the team that represented South Africa Seven in Delhi. Helping the team to a third place finish overall. These are the games that highlighted the prowess of Africa on the main stage of rugby Sevens. From hereon, he was to join the main team for the world series.

=== 2014 Commonwealth Games - Glasgow ===
Cecil was named in this team to represent South Africa in their campaign to unseat New Zealand who had never lost a game at all Commonwealth Games since the inception of Sevens at the games in 1998. Rugby sevens at the 2014 Commonwealth Games was one of South Africa Sevens best tournaments where they ended up as champions winning GOLD.

=== 2016 Summer Olympics ===
Afrika was included in a 12-man squad for the 2016 Summer Olympics in Rio de Janeiro. He was named in the starting line-up for their first match in Pool B of the competition against Spain and scored two tries and two conversions to help South Africa to a 24–0 victory. He started their second match against France, converting three of South Africa's tries in a 26–0 victory, and dropped to the bench for their final match against Australia. Despite a 5–12 defeat in this match, South Africa still finished top of Pool B to set up a quarter final rematch against Australia. Afrika was restored to the starting line-up for this match and converted one of South Africa's tries in a 22–5 victory. He started South Africa's semi-final match against Great Britain but could not prevent them losing 5–7 to be eliminated from gold medal contention. He also started their third-place play-off, scoring two tries and kicking five conversions in his side's 54–14 victory over Japan to help South Africa secure a bronze medal in the competition.

=== Honours ===
- Springboks Blitzbok colours from 2009 with 345 match appearances for South Africa
- Leading Record Points for South Africa as at 2023/10/10 with 1465 points
- 2010/2011 IRB International Sevens Player of the Year
- 2010 Commonwealth Games in Delhi - Bronze Medal winner
- 2014 Commonwealth Games in Glasgow - Gold Medal winner
- 2016 Rio Olympics Summer Games - Bronze Medal winner

=== Retirement ===
Afrika retired from international sevens as South Africa's all time leading World Series scorer in June 2020.

Following on his long Sevens career and on his success in the 2011 HSBC Sevens World Series, he was in 2021 unveiled as the new International Rugby Board ‘Keep Rugby Clean’ Ambassador for sevens.

== Club Rugby ==
Afrika came through at the South African Currie Cup side Griffons before transitioning into the South African 7s setup. In 2017 he has a brief stint with the Cheetahs in their first season in the Pro14.

In 2021 Afrika signed for American side San Diego Legion for the 2021 season as a fullback.
