= Chile Sevens =

Rugby sevens tournament in Santiago, Chile

- Sport: Rugby sevens
- First season: 2002
- No. of teams: 16
- Most recent champion: New Zealand (2002)

The Chile Sevens, also known as the Santiago Sevens, was an international rugby sevens tournament played in Santiago that counted as a leg of the IRB Sevens World Series in the 2001–02 season. It was held at Estadio San Carlos de Apoquindo in Las Condes.

== Event winners ==
Year	Venue	Cup final			Placings			Refs
		Winner	Score	Runner-up	Plate	Bowl	Shield	
2002	Estadio San Carlos de Apoquindo	New Zealand	21–7	Argentina	Samoa	United States	Uruguay	
