= New Zealand Sevens (tournament) =

Rugby sevens tournament

- Most recent season or competition: 2023 New Zealand Sevens
- Sport: Rugby sevens
- Founded: 2000
- No. of teams: 16
- Country: New Zealand
- Most recent champion: Argentina (2023)
- Most titles: New Zealand (10 titles)
- Website: sevens.co.nz

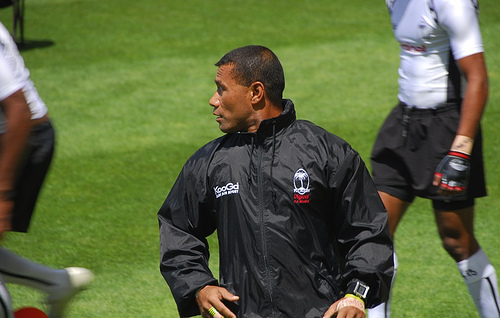
Fiji's Waisale Serevi at Wellington in 2007.

The New Zealand Sevens was an annual rugby sevens tournament held at Waikato Stadium in Hamilton, New Zealand. For the first eighteen years of its history the event was held in Wellington. The event was the third on the World Rugby Sevens Series circuit and is generally held in late January or early February.

== History ==
=== Wellington ===
Wellington first hosted a tournament in 2000 as part of the inaugural Sevens World Series. The event was the first to be held in the newly-developed Westpac Stadium. The tournament built a reputation for a party atmosphere, with a large proportion of attendees choosing to wear fancy dress. Movie figures such as the Men in Black (MIB) and Austin Powers were crowd favorites and an impersonator of Austin Powers was a regular for many years performing for the crowd. Host team New Zealand dominated the sevens competition in Wellington, winning just over half of all the tournaments held.

=== Hamilton ===
The location of the tournament was moved to Hamilton in 2018, after attendances in Wellington had declined. The tournament was hosted as part of an integrated men's and women's event from 2019. Discussion was also begun on alternating the host location of the tournament between Hamilton and Suva, in Fiji, following the 2020 edition.

== Results ==
Year	Venue	Cup final			Placings		
		Winner	Score	Runner-up	Plate	Bowl	Shield
2000	Westpac Stadium	Fiji	24–14	New Zealand	Canada	France	n/a
2001	Westpac Stadium	Australia	19–17	Fiji	Samoa	South Africa	Japan
2002	Westpac Stadium	South Africa	17–14	Samoa	Argentina	France	Cook Islands
2003	Westpac Stadium	New Zealand	38–26	England	Samoa	Canada	Tonga
2004	Westpac Stadium	New Zealand	33–15	Fiji	Tonga	Argentina	United States
2005	Westpac Stadium	New Zealand	31–7	Argentina	Australia	Kenya	Niue
2006	Westpac Stadium	Fiji	27–22	South Africa	England	Scotland	Tonga
2007	Westpac Stadium	Samoa	17–14	Fiji	England	Argentina	Portugal
2008	Westpac Stadium	New Zealand	22–17	Samoa	South Africa	England	United States
2009	Westpac Stadium	England	19–17	New Zealand	South Africa	Cook Islands	Scotland
2010	Westpac Stadium	Fiji	19–14	Samoa	Australia	Wales	United States
2011	Westpac Stadium	New Zealand	29–14	England	Fiji	Kenya	United States
2012	Westpac Stadium	New Zealand	24–7	Fiji	South Africa	Kenya	Scotland
2013	Westpac Stadium	England	24–19	Kenya	Australia	Canada	Wales
2014	Westpac Stadium	New Zealand	21–0	South Africa	Australia	Kenya	United States
2015	Westpac Stadium	New Zealand	27–21	England	Fiji	France	Canada
2016	Westpac Stadium	New Zealand	24–21	South Africa	Australia	Samoa	France
		Winner	Score	Runner-up	Third	Fourth	Fifth
2017	Westpac Stadium	South Africa	26–5	Fiji	Scotland	Canada	Argentina
2018	Waikato Stadium	Fiji	24–17	South Africa	Australia	New Zealand	United States
2019	Waikato Stadium	Fiji	38–0	United States	New Zealand	South Africa	Samoa
2020	Waikato Stadium	New Zealand	27–5	France	Australia	England	Canada
World Series tournaments planned for Hamilton were cancelled in 2021 and 2022, due to impacts of the COVID-19 pandemic.
2023	Waikato Stadium	Argentina	14–12	New Zealand	United States	France	Australia

== See also ==
- New Zealand Women's Sevens
