= 2008 Edinburgh Sevens =

Rugby sevens tournament

The 2008 Edinburgh Sevens was the second edition of a rugby sevens (seven-a-side version of rugby union) tournament which forms part of the IRB Sevens World Series, an annual series of events for national representative teams in sevens. It took place on 31 May and 1 June at Murrayfield in Edinburgh, Scotland, and was the eighth and final Cup trophy in the 2007–08 IRB Sevens World Series.

New Zealand, which had already clinched the overall series title, put an exclamation point on their dominant season by winning the Cup competition, beating England in the final. South Africa won the second-tier Plate over the host Scots. The remaining prizes, the Bowl and Shield, respectively went to Australia and Portugal.

== Pool stages ==
=== Pool A ===
Team	Pld	W	D	L	PF	PA	+/-	Pts
New Zealand	3	3	0	0	94	12	+82	9
England	3	1	1	1	51	38	+13	6
Russia	3	1	1	1	36	74	-38	6
Portugal	3	0	0	3	12	69	-57	3

Date	Team 1	Score	Team 2
2008-05-31	New Zealand	45–0	Russia
2008-05-31	England	22–0	Portugal
2008-05-31	New Zealand	28–0	Portugal
2008-05-31	England	17–17	Russia
2008-05-31	Russia	19–12	Portugal
2008-05-31	New Zealand	21–12	England

=== Pool B ===
Team	Pld	W	D	L	PF	PA	+/-	Pts
South Africa	3	2	1	0	58	52	+6	8
Scotland	3	1	1	1	71	46	+25	6
Argentina	3	0	2	1	48	55	-7	5
Australia	3	1	0	2	38	62	-24	5

Date	Team 1	Score	Team 2
2008-05-31	South Africa	19–19	Argentina
2008-05-31	Australia	7–33	Scotland
2008-05-31	South Africa	22–21	Scotland
2008-05-31	Australia	19–12	Argentina
2008-05-31	Argentina	17–17	Scotland
2008-05-31	South Africa	17–12	Australia

=== Pool C ===
Team	Pld	W	D	L	PF	PA	+/-	Pts
Wales	3	3	0	0	79	28	+51	9
Samoa	3	2	0	1	62	46	+16	7
Spain	3	1	0	2	36	65	-29	5
Canada	3	0	0	3	34	72	-38	3

Date	Team 1	Score	Team 2
2008-05-31	Samoa	24–17	Canada
2008-05-31	Wales	31–7	Spain
2008-05-31	Samoa	24–5	Spain
2008-05-31	Wales	24–7	Canada
2008-05-31	Canada	10–24	Spain
2008-05-31	Samoa	14–24	Wales

=== Pool D ===
Team	Pld	W	D	L	PF	PA	+/-	Pts
Fiji	3	3	0	0	132	14	+118	9
France	3	2	0	1	76	54	+22	7
Kenya	3	1	0	2	41	65	-24	5
Moldova	3	0	0	3	12	121	-109	3

Date	Team 1	Score	Team 2
2008-05-31	Fiji	42–7	France
2008-05-31	Kenya	22–5	Moldova
2008-05-31	Fiji	52–7	Moldova
2008-05-31	Kenya	12–22	France
2008-05-31	France	47–0	Moldova
2008-05-31	Fiji	38–7	Kenya

== Knockout ==
=== Shield ===
Quarter-finals
1 June - Edinburgh, Scotland
Russia	0
Argentina	38
1 June - Edinburgh, Scotland
Kenya	10
Canada	19
1 June - Edinburgh, Scotland
Spain	33
Moldova	7
1 June - Edinburgh, Scotland
Australia	19
Portugal	5

Semi-finals
1 June - Edinburgh, Scotland
Russia	7
Kenya	0
1 June - Edinburgh, Scotland
Moldova	0
Portugal	36

Final
1 June - Edinburgh, Scotland
Russia	5
Portugal	10

=== Bowl ===
Quarter-finals
1 June - Edinburgh, Scotland
Russia	0
Argentina	38
1 June - Edinburgh, Scotland
Kenya	10
Canada	19
1 June - Edinburgh, Scotland
Spain	33
Moldova	7
1 June - Edinburgh, Scotland
Australia	19
Portugal	5

Semi-finals
1 June - Edinburgh, Scotland
Argentina	7
Canada	14
1 June - Edinburgh, Scotland
Spain	0
Australia	24

Final
1 June - Edinburgh, Scotland
Canada	14
Australia	24

=== Plate ===
Quarter-finals
1 June - Edinburgh, Scotland
New Zealand	36
Scotland	14
1 June - Edinburgh, Scotland
Fiji	10
Samoa	17
1 June - Edinburgh, Scotland
Wales	19
France	10
1 June - Edinburgh, Scotland
South Africa	0
England	10

Semi-finals
1 June - Edinburgh, Scotland
Scotland	19
Fiji	14
1 June - Edinburgh, Scotland
France	0
South Africa	17

Final
1 June - Edinburgh, Scotland
Scotland	5
South Africa	14

=== Cup ===
Quarter-finals
1 June - Edinburgh, Scotland
New Zealand	36
Scotland	14
1 June - Edinburgh, Scotland
Fiji	10
Samoa	17
1 June - Edinburgh, Scotland
Wales	19
France	10
1 June - Edinburgh, Scotland
South Africa	0
England	10

Semi-finals
1 June - Edinburgh, Scotland
New Zealand	14
Samoa	0
1 June - Edinburgh, Scotland
Wales	0
England	7

Final
1 June - Edinburgh, Scotland
New Zealand	24
England	14
