= 2011 Hong Kong Sevens =

Rugby union sevens tournament

- Host nation: Hong Kong
- Date: 25 – 27 March 2011

Cup
- Champion: New Zealand
- Runner-up: England

Plate
- Winner: South Africa
- Runner-up: Australia

Bowl
- Winner: Canada
- Runner-up: Japan

Shield
- Winner: Kenya
- Runner-up: Spain

The 2011 Hong Kong Sevens was a seven-a-side rugby union tournament, part of the 2010–11 IRB Sevens World Series. The competition was being held from 25–27 March in at Hong Kong Stadium in Hong Kong and featured 24 teams.

== Teams ==
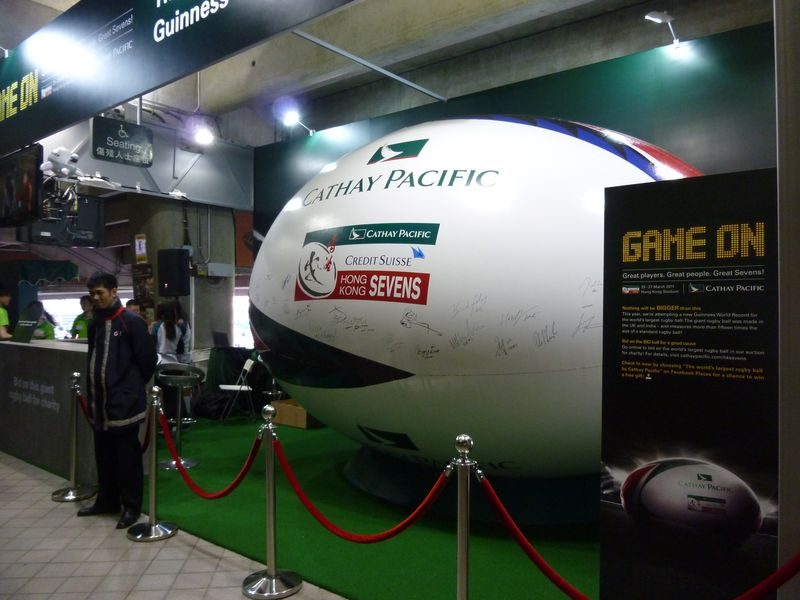
World's largest rugby ball – being auctioned – on display in the grounds

The following teams participated:

- Argentina
- Australia
- Canada
- China
- England
- Fiji
- France
- Hong Kong
- Japan
- Kenya
- Malaysia
- Mexico
- New Zealand
- Portugal
- Russia
- Samoa
- Scotland
- South Africa
- South Korea
- Spain
- Tonga
- United States
- Wales
- Zimbabwe

== Security ==
Following an incident in 2010 when one spectator invaded the pitch, climbed onto the crossbars at the south end of the stadium before dodging back into the stands and disappearing, organisers stepped up security and announced a zero-tolerance policy of invaders in 2011. Out of concerns for safety, the local Rugby Union sent out notification that anyone entering the playing area who should not enter would be arrested by the police, instead of just being ejected from the arena.

Hong Kong Police said they received 28 reports of fans who had been victims of ticket fraud. The fans had bought the tickets from websites based in Australia, Dubai and England. The Wan Chai criminal investigation team is looking into the cases, which have been classified as "crimes outside Hong Kong." The Hong Kong Rugby Football Union confirmed that easily distinguishable bogus tickets, differing in both colour and font types, were found at the entrance to the venue. Their holders were refused entry.

== Pool stage ==
Key to colours in group tables
Teams that advanced to the Cup Quarter Final

=== Pool A ===
Pos	Team	Pld	W	D	L	PF	PA	PD	Pts
1	New Zealand	3	3	0	0	99	19	+80	9
2	Portugal	3	2	0	1	65	38	+27	7
3	France	3	1	0	2	52	38	+14	5
4	South Korea	3	0	0	3	21	142	−121	3

Date	Team 1	Score	Team 2
2011-03-25	New Zealand	61 – 0	South Korea
2011-03-25	France	5 – 12	Portugal
2011-03-26	France	40 – 7	South Korea
2011-03-26	New Zealand	19 – 12	Portugal
2011-03-26	Portugal	41 – 14	South Korea
2011-03-26	New Zealand	19 – 7	France

=== Pool B ===
Pos	Team	Pld	W	D	L	PF	PA	PD	Pts
1	England	3	3	0	0	129	31	+98	9
2	United States	3	2	0	1	72	70	+2	7
3	Japan	3	1	0	2	50	69	−19	5
4	China	3	0	0	3	31	112	−81	3

Date	Team 1	Score	Team 2
2011-03-25	England	59 – 5	China
2011-03-25	United States	24 – 19	Japan
2011-03-26	United States	36 – 14	China
2011-03-26	England	33 – 14	Japan
2011-03-26	Japan	17 – 12	China
2011-03-26	England	37 – 12	United States

=== Pool C ===
Pos	Team	Pld	W	D	L	PF	PA	PD	Pts
1	Samoa	3	3	0	0	119	31	+88	9
2	Scotland	3	2	0	1	66	48	+18	7
3	Tonga	3	1	0	2	68	36	+32	5
4	Mexico	3	0	0	3	7	145	−138	3

Date	Team 1	Score	Team 2
2011-03-25	Samoa	64 – 0	Mexico
2011-03-25	Scotland	12 – 10	Tonga
2011-03-26	Scotland	40 – 7	Mexico
2011-03-26	Samoa	24 – 17	Tonga
2011-03-26	Tonga	41 – 0	Mexico
2011-03-26	Samoa	31 – 14	Scotland

=== Pool D ===
Pos	Team	Pld	W	D	L	PF	PA	PD	Pts
1	Fiji	3	3	0	0	128	14	+114	9
2	Russia	3	2	0	1	86	34	+52	7
3	Kenya	3	1	0	2	50	74	−24	5
4	Malaysia	3	0	0	3	12	154	−142	3

Date	Team 1	Score	Team 2
2011-03-25	Fiji	59 – 0	Malaysia
2011-03-25	Kenya	5 – 22	Russia
2011-03-26	Kenya	45 – 12	Malaysia
2011-03-26	Fiji	29 – 14	Russia
2011-03-26	Russia	50 – 0	Malaysia
2011-03-26	Fiji	40 – 0	Kenya

=== Pool E ===
Pos	Team	Pld	W	D	L	PF	PA	PD	Pts
1	South Africa	3	3	0	0	120	17	+103	9
2	Wales	3	2	0	1	75	59	+16	7
3	Spain	3	1	0	2	34	68	−34	5
4	Hong Kong	3	0	0	3	19	104	−85	3

Date	Team 1	Score	Team 2
2011-03-25	South Africa	33 – 5	Spain
2011-03-25	Wales	35 – 12	Hong Kong
2011-03-26	Wales	28 – 5	Spain
2011-03-26	South Africa	45 – 0	Hong Kong
2011-03-26	Hong Kong	7 – 24	Spain
2011-03-26	South Africa	42 – 12	Wales

=== Pool F ===
Pos	Team	Pld	W	D	L	PF	PA	PD	Pts
1	Australia	3	3	0	0	89	38	+51	9
2	Canada	3	2	0	1	70	57	+13	7
3	Argentina	3	1	0	2	56	55	+1	5
4	Zimbabwe	3	0	0	3	22	87	−65	3

Date	Team 1	Score	Team 2
2011-03-25	Australia	42 – 0	Zimbabwe
2011-03-25	Argentina	21 – 22	Canada
2011-03-26	Argentina	21 – 12	Zimbabwe
2011-03-26	Australia	26 – 24	Canada
2011-03-26	Canada	24 – 10	Zimbabwe
2011-03-26	Australia	21 – 14	Argentina

== Knockout stage ==
=== Shield ===
Quarter-finals
27 March - Hong Kong
Kenya	59
Malaysia	7
27 March - Hong Kong
Hong Kong	26
China	35
27 March - Hong Kong
Zimbabwe	28
South Korea	12
27 March - Hong Kong
Mexico	5
Spain	26

Semi-finals
27 March - Hong Kong
Kenya	24
China	5
27 March - Hong Kong
Zimbabwe	14
Spain	17

Final
27 March - Hong Kong
Kenya	17 (a.e.t.)
Spain	12

=== Bowl ===
Quarter-finals
27 March - Hong Kong
Scotland	14
Japan	19
27 March - Hong Kong
Tonga	21
United States	28
27 March - Hong Kong
Canada	12
France	5
27 March - Hong Kong
Argentina	14
Wales	29

Semi-finals
27 March - Hong Kong
Japan	14
United States	12
27 March - Hong Kong
Canada	24
Wales	17

Final
27 March - Hong Kong
Japan	12
Canada	33

=== Plate ===
Quarter-finals
27 March - Hong Kong
New Zealand	33
Portugal	5
27 March - Hong Kong
South Africa	19
Fiji	24
27 March - Hong Kong
Samoa	15
Australia	12
27 March - Hong Kong
Russia	7
England	10

Semi-finals
27 March - Hong Kong
Portugal	5
South Africa	28
27 March - Hong Kong
Australia	35
Russia	12

Final
27 March - Hong Kong
South Africa	26
Australia	19

=== Cup ===
New Zealand, Fiji, England and Samoa reached the semi-finals round. Fiji facing the New Zealand All Blacks, the World Series leaders and favourites 19–14 while England faced Samoa. After Fiji and Samoa were knocked out, both by 19–14, New Zealand faced England in the final.

New Zealand triumphed 29–17 over England: Frank Halai put the All Blacks ahead with a try, and Mat Turner equalised for England. By half time, New Zealand nudged 12–5 ahead after Halai scored a second try.

At the end of the tournament, New Zealand lead England by five points in the World Championship. With 105 points, England remain well clear of Fiji and Samoa, who rank third-equal on 84 points.

Quarter-finals
27 March - Hong Kong
New Zealand	33
Portugal	5
27 March - Hong Kong
South Africa	19
Fiji	24
27 March - Hong Kong
Samoa	15
Australia	12
27 March - Hong Kong
Russia	7
England	10

Semi-finals
27 March - Hong Kong
New Zealand	19
Fiji	14
27 March - Hong Kong
Samoa	14
England	19

Final
27 March - Hong Kong
New Zealand	29
England	17

== Statistics ==
=== Individual points ===
Individual Points
Pos.	Player	Country	Points
1	Cecil Afrika	South Africa	88
2	Hamish Angus	Australia	55
3	Ben Gollings	England	45
4	Emosi Vucago	Fiji	42
5-tie	Katsuyuki Sakai	Japan	40
5-tie	Andrew Skeen	Scotland	40
7	Buxton Popoalii	New Zealand	37
8-tie	Dan Norton	England	35
8-tie	Kristian Phillips	Wales	35
8-tie	Tom Iosefo	Samoa	35
8-tie	Vladimir Ostroushko	Russia	35

=== Individual tries ===
Individual Tries
Pos.	Player	Country	Tries
1	Cecil Afrika	South Africa	8
2-tie	Tom Iosefo	Samoa	7
2-tie	Dan Norton	England	7
2-tie	Vladimir Ostroushko	Russia	7
2-tie	Kristian Phillips	Wales	7
6-tie	Seremaia Burotu	Fiji	6
6-tie	Sibusiso Sithole	South Africa	6
6-tie	Zach Test	United States	6
6-tie	Emosi Vucago	Fiji	6
10-tie	Greg Barden	England	5
10-tie	David Batiratu	Fiji	5
10-tie	Alex Cuthbert	Wales	5
10-tie	Chris Dry	South Africa	5
10-tie	Paul Emerick	United States	5
10-tie	Ciaran Hearn	Canada	5
10-tie	Collins Injera	Kenya	5
10-tie	Nikola Matawalu	Fiji	5
10-tie	Declan O'Donnell	New Zealand	5
10-tie	Chauncey O'Toole	Canada	5

== Women's tournament ==
The Cable&Wireless Worldwide Hong Kong Women's Rugby Sevens tournament, with all matches played on 25 March 2011, was won by Canada; France claimed runner-up. The Canadian team won all their matches: Playing pool matches against Japan, Chinese Taipei, and Russia, they triumphed 31–0, 64–0, and 40-7 respectively. Canada then defeated USA 26–5 to reach the finals. The French team, which had won against Hong Kong, Philippines, Netherlands and China to reach the final, lost to Canada by 28–14.

Preceded by USA Sevens	Hong Kong Sevens; 2011	Succeeded by Adelaide Sevens
