= 2011 Adelaide Sevens =

- IRB Sevens XII
- Host nation: Australia
- Date: 2–3 April 2011

Cup
- Champion: New Zealand
- Runner-up: South Africa

Plate
- Winner: Wales
- Runner-up: Argentina

Bowl
- Winner: United States
- Runner-up: Kenya

Shield
- Winner: Japan
- Runner-up: Tonga

Tournament details
- Attendance: 27,000 over both days

The 2011 Adelaide Sevens, promoted as the International Rugby Sevens Adelaide 2011, was a rugby sevens tournament that was part of the IRB Sevens World Series in the 2010–11 season. It was the Australian Sevens leg of the series, held over the weekend of 2–3 April 2011 at the Adelaide Oval in South Australia.

The competition was won by New Zealand who defeated South Africa 28–20 in the Cup final.

This was the final edition of the Adelaide Sevens, though not of the Australian leg of the IRB Sevens. The Gold Coast became the new host for the next four events beginning in 2011–12. The Gold Coast tournament was moved to the start of the calendar for the IRB series, opening the season in November 2011.

== Format ==
The teams were drawn into four pools of four teams each. Each team played the other teams in their pool once, with 3 points awarded for a win, 2 points for a draw, and 1 point for a loss (no points awarded for a forfeit). The top two teams from each group progressed to quarter-finals in the main competition, with the winners of those quarter-finals competing in cup semi-finals and the losers competing in plate semi-finals. The bottom two teams from each group progressed to quarter-finals in the consolation competition, with the winners of those quarter-finals competing in bowl semi-finals and the losers competing in shield semi-finals.

== Teams ==
The following teams participated:

- Argentina
- Australia
- Cook Islands
- England
- Fiji
- France
- Japan
- Kenya
- New Zealand
- Papua New Guinea
- Samoa
- Scotland
- South Africa
- Tonga
- United States
- Wales

== Pool stage ==
Play on the first day of the tournament consisted of matches between teams in the same pool on a round robin basis. The following is a list of the recorded results.

Key to colours in group tables
Teams that advanced to the Cup Quarter-final

=== Pool A ===
Teams	Pld	W	D	L	PF	PA	+/-	Pts
New Zealand	3	3	0	0	110	31	+79	9
Wales	3	2	0	1	89	50	+39	7
Kenya	3	1	0	2	47	72	−25	5
Cook Islands	3	0	0	3	19	112	−93	3

2 April 2011

New Zealand	36–10	Wales

Adelaide Oval

2 April 2011

Kenya	19–12	Cook Islands

Adelaide Oval

2 April 2011

New Zealand	40–7	Cook Islands

Adelaide Oval

2 April 2011

Kenya	14–26	Wales

Adelaide Oval

2 April 2011

Wales	53–0	Cook Islands

Adelaide Oval

2 April 2011

New Zealand	34–14	Kenya

Adelaide Oval

=== Pool B ===
Teams	Pld	W	D	L	PF	PA	+/-	Pts
England	3	3	0	0	111	38	+73	9
Argentina	3	2	0	1	86	33	+53	7
Scotland	3	1	0	2	33	81	−48	5
Papua New Guinea	3	0	0	3	31	109	−78	3

2 April 2011

England	45–7	Scotland

Adelaide Oval

2 April 2011

Argentina	45–5	Papua New Guinea

Adelaide Oval

2 April 2011

England	45–12	Papua New Guinea

Adelaide Oval

2 April 2011

Argentina	22–7	Scotland

Adelaide Oval

2 April 2011

Scotland	19–14	Papua New Guinea

Adelaide Oval

2 April 2011

England	21–19	Argentina

Adelaide Oval

=== Pool C ===
Teams	Pld	W	D	L	PF	PA	+/-	Pts
Fiji	3	3	0	0	100	40	+60	9
Australia	3	2	0	1	89	50	+39	7
United States	3	1	0	2	39	81	−42	5
Tonga	3	0	0	3	40	97	−57	3

2 April 2011

Fiji	41–5	United States

Adelaide Oval

2 April 2011

Australia	40–14	Tonga

Adelaide Oval

2 April 2011

Fiji	33–14	Tonga

Adelaide Oval

2 April 2011

Australia	28–10	United States

Adelaide Oval

2 April 2011

United States	24–12	Tonga

Adelaide Oval

2 April 2011

Fiji	26–21	Australia

Adelaide Oval

=== Pool D ===
Teams	Pld	W	D	L	PF	PA	+/-	Pts
Samoa	3	3	0	0	85	36	+49	9
South Africa	3	2	0	1	57	38	+19	7
France	3	1	0	2	52	45	+7	5
Japan	3	0	0	3	26	101	−75	3

2 April 2011

South Africa	19–0	France

Adelaide Oval

2 April 2011

Samoa	40–7	Japan

Adelaide Oval

2 April 2011

South Africa	21–12	Japan

Adelaide Oval

2 April 2011

Samoa	19–12	France

Adelaide Oval

2 April 2011

France	40–7	Japan

Adelaide Oval

2 April 2011

South Africa	17–26	Samoa

Adelaide Oval

== Knockout stage ==
Play on the second day of the tournament consisted of finals matches for the Bowl, Plate, and Cup competitions. The following is a list of the recorded results.

=== Shield ===
Quarter-finals
3 April – Adelaide
Kenya	26
Papua New Guinea	17
3 April – Adelaide
France	21
Tonga	17
3 April – Adelaide
United States	22
Japan	19
3 April – Adelaide
Scotland	28
Cook Islands	0

Semi-finals
3 April – Adelaide
Papua New Guinea	19
Tonga	24
3 April – Adelaide
Japan	31
Cook Islands	21

Final
3 April – Adelaide
Tonga	5
Japan	22

=== Bowl ===
Quarter-finals
3 April – Adelaide
Kenya	26
Papua New Guinea	17
3 April – Adelaide
France	21
Tonga	17
3 April – Adelaide
United States	22
Japan	19
3 April – Adelaide
Scotland	28
Cook Islands	0

Semi-finals
3 April – Adelaide
Kenya	24
France	10
3 April – Adelaide
United States	29
Scotland	19

Final
3 April – Adelaide
Kenya	10
United States	17

=== Plate ===
Quarter-finals
3 April – Adelaide
New Zealand	47
Argentina	7
3 April – Adelaide
Samoa	19
Australia	14
3 April – Adelaide
Fiji	12
South Africa	24
3 April – Adelaide
England	17
Wales	12

Semi-finals
3 April – Adelaide
Argentina	31
Australia	28
3 April – Adelaide
Fiji	21
Wales	22

Final
3 April – Adelaide
Argentina	7
Wales	14

=== Cup ===
Quarter-finals
3 April – Adelaide
New Zealand	47
Argentina	7
3 April – Adelaide
Samoa	19
Australia	14
3 April – Adelaide
Fiji	12
South Africa	24
3 April – Adelaide
England	17
Wales	12

Semi-finals
3 April – Adelaide
New Zealand	33
Samoa	17
3 April – Adelaide
South Africa	19
England	0

Final
3 April – Adelaide
New Zealand	28
South Africa	20

== Reference list ==
Preceded by Hong Kong Sevens	Adelaide Sevens; 2011	Succeeded by London Sevens
