= 2011 Edinburgh Sevens =

Rugby sevens tournament

- Host nation: Scotland
- Date: May 28 – 29, 2011

Cup
- Champion: South Africa
- Runner-up: Australia

Plate
- Winner: Fiji
- Runner-up: Samoa

Bowl
- Winner: Kenya
- Runner-up: Scotland

Shield
- Winner: Canada
- Runner-up: Russia

The 2011 Edinburgh Sevens was a rugby union sevens tournament, part of the 2010–11 IRB Sevens World Series. The competition was held from May 28–29 at Murrayfield Stadium in Scotland and featured 16 teams.

== Format ==
The tournament consisted of four round-robin pools of four teams. All sixteen teams progressed to the knockout stage. The top two teams from each group progressed to quarter-finals in the main competition, with the winners of those quarter-finals competing in cup semi-finals and the losers competing in plate semi-finals. The bottom two teams from each group progressed to quarter-finals in the consolation competition, with the winners of those quarter-finals competing in bowl semi-finals and the losers competing in shield semi-finals.

== Teams ==
The following teams participated:

- Argentina
- Australia
- Canada
- England
- Fiji
- France
- Kenya
- New Zealand
- Portugal
- Russia
- Samoa
- Scotland
- South Africa
- Spain
- United States
- Wales

== Pool stage ==
Key to colours in group tables
Teams that advanced to the Cup Quarter Final

=== Pool A ===
Team	Pld	W	D	L	PF	PA	+/-	Pts
New Zealand	3	3	0	0	124	12	+112	9
France	3	2	0	1	22	53	−31	7
Argentina	3	1	0	2	33	52	−19	5
Russia	3	0	0	3	12	74	−62	3

Date	Team 1	Score	Team 2
2011-05-28	New Zealand	43 – 0	Russia
2011-05-28	Argentina	5 – 7	France
2011-05-28	New Zealand	43 – 5	France
2011-05-28	Argentina	21 – 7	Russia
2011-05-28	Russia	5 – 10	France
2011-05-28	New Zealand	38 – 7	Argentina

=== Pool B ===
Team	Pld	W	D	L	PF	PA	+/-	Pts
Wales	3	3	0	0	61	29	+32	9
England	3	2	0	1	58	36	+22	7
Spain	3	1	0	2	24	34	−10	5
Portugal	3	0	0	3	22	66	−44	3

Date	Team 1	Score	Team 2
2011-05-28	England	24 – 5	Portugal
2011-05-28	Wales	7 – 5	Spain
2011-05-28	England	22 – 12	Spain
2011-05-28	Wales	35 – 12	Portugal
2011-05-28	Portugal	5 – 7	Spain
2011-05-28	England	12 – 19	Wales

=== Pool C ===
Team	Pld	W	D	L	PF	PA	+/-	Pts
South Africa	3	3	0	0	82	24	+58	9
Australia	3	2	0	1	54	38	+16	7
Kenya	3	1	0	2	59	50	+9	5
Canada	3	0	0	3	22	105	−83	3

Date	Team 1	Score	Team 2
2011-05-28	South Africa	32 – 5	Canada
2011-05-28	Australia	14 – 7	Kenya
2011-05-28	South Africa	31 – 14	Kenya
2011-05-28	Australia	35 – 12	Canada
2011-05-28	Canada	5 – 38	Kenya
2011-05-28	South Africa	19 – 5	Australia

=== Pool D ===
Team	Pld	W	D	L	PF	PA	+/-	Pts
Fiji	3	2	0	1	54	35	+19	7
Samoa	3	2	0	1	61	43	+18	7
Scotland	3	2	0	1	69	52	+17	7
United States	3	0	0	3	33	87	−54	3

Date	Team 1	Score	Team 2
2011-05-28	Samoa	21 – 12	United States
2011-05-28	Fiji	12 – 14	Scotland
2011-05-28	Samoa	33 – 10	Scotland
2011-05-28	Fiji	21 – 14	United States
2011-05-28	Samoa	7 – 21	Fiji
2011-05-28	Scotland	45 – 7	United States

== Knockout stage ==
=== Shield ===
Quarter-finals
May 29 – Edinburgh
Argentina	24
Portugal	5
May 29 – Edinburgh
Scotland	26
Canada	14
May 29 – Edinburgh
Kenya	17
United States	15
May 29 – Edinburgh
Spain	7
Russia	0

Semi-finals
May 29 – Edinburgh
Portugal	5
Canada	17
May 29 – Edinburgh
United States	12
Russia	17

Final
May 29 – Edinburgh
Canada	17
Russia	12

=== Bowl ===
Quarter-finals
May 29 – Edinburgh
Argentina	24
Portugal	5
May 29 – Edinburgh
Scotland	26
Canada	14
May 29 – Edinburgh
Kenya	17
United States	15
May 29 – Edinburgh
Spain	7
Russia	0

Semi-finals
May 29 – Edinburgh
Argentina	7
Scotland	22
May 29 – Edinburgh
Kenya	40
Spain	0

Final
May 29 – Edinburgh
Scotland	14
Kenya	21

=== Plate ===
Quarter-finals
May 29 – Edinburgh
New Zealand	26
England	12
May 29 – Edinburgh
Fiji	14
Australia	24
May 29 – Edinburgh
South Africa	28
Samoa	5
May 29 – Edinburgh
Wales	13
France	10

Semi-finals
May 29 – Edinburgh
England	19
Fiji	34
May 29 – Edinburgh
Samoa	17
France	10

Final
May 29 – Edinburgh
Fiji	26
Samoa	14

=== Cup ===
Quarter-finals
May 29 – Edinburgh
New Zealand	26
England	12
May 29 – Edinburgh
Fiji	14
Australia	24
May 29 – Edinburgh
South Africa	28
Samoa	5
May 29 – Edinburgh
Wales	13
France	10

Semi-finals
May 29 – Edinburgh
New Zealand	12
Australia	19
May 29 – Edinburgh
South Africa	22
Wales	19

Final
May 29 – Edinburgh
Australia	35
South Africa	36

Preceded by London Sevens	Edinburgh Sevens	Succeeded by End
