= 2011 USA Sevens =

- 2010–11 Sevens World Series
- Host nation: United States

Cup
- Champion: South Africa
- Runner-up: Fiji

Plate
- Winner: Samoa

Tournament details
- Matches played: 45

The 2011 USA Sevens competition was held on February 12 and February 13 at Sam Boyd Stadium in the Las Vegas, Nevada area. The USA Sevens is played annually as part of the IRB Sevens World Series for international rugby sevens (seven-a-side version of rugby union). It was the fourth of eight events in the 2010–11 IRB Sevens World Series.

== Format ==
The tournament consisted of four round-robin pools of four teams. All sixteen teams progressed to the knockout stage. The top two teams from each group progressed to quarter-finals in the main competition, with the winners of those quarter-finals competing in cup semi-finals and the losers competing in plate semi-finals. The bottom two teams from each group progressed to quarter-finals in the consolation competition, with the winners of those quarter-finals competing in bowl semi-finals and the losers competing in shield semi-finals.

== Teams ==
These 16 teams are invited to participate in the 2011 tournament:

- Argentina
- Australia
- Canada
- England
- Fiji
- France
- Guyana
- Japan
- Kenya
- New Zealand
- Samoa
- Scotland
- South Africa
- United States
- Uruguay
- Wales

== Pool stages ==
Key to colours in group tables
Teams that advanced to the Cup Quarter Final

=== Pool A ===
Team	Pld	W	D	L	PF	PA	+/-	Pts
England	3	3	0	0	99	28	+71	9
Argentina	3	2	0	1	82	36	+46	7
France	3	1	0	2	90	61	+29	5
Guyana	3	0	0	3	7	153	−146	3

Date	Team 1	Score	Team 2
2011-02-12	England	49 – 0	Guyana
2011-02-12	Argentina	21 – 19	France
2011-02-12	England	33 – 14	France
2011-02-12	Argentina	47 – 0	Guyana
2011-02-12	England	17 – 14	Argentina
2011-02-12	France	57 – 7	Guyana

=== Pool B ===
Team	Pld	W	D	L	PF	PA	+/-	Pts
New Zealand	3	3	0	0	91	15	+76	9
Kenya	3	2	0	1	57	44	+13	7
Wales	3	1	0	2	50	55	−5	5
Uruguay	3	0	0	3	17	101	−84	3

Date	Team 1	Score	Team 2
2011-02-12	New Zealand	40 – 0	Uruguay
2011-02-12	Wales	12 – 19	Kenya
2011-02-12	New Zealand	25 – 10	Kenya
2011-02-12	Wales	33 – 10	Uruguay
2011-02-12	New Zealand	26 – 5	Wales
2011-02-12	Kenya	28 – 7	Uruguay

=== Pool C ===
Team	Pld	W	D	L	PF	PA	+/-	Pts
Fiji	3	3	0	0	99	24	+75	9
Australia	3	2	0	1	53	56	−3	7
Scotland	3	1	0	2	42	62	−20	5
Canada	3	0	0	3	33	85	−52	3

Date	Team 1	Score	Team 2
2011-02-12	Fiji	33 – 0	Canada
2011-02-12	Australia	12 – 7	Scotland
2011-02-12	Fiji	31 – 14	Scotland
2011-02-12	Australia	31 – 14	Canada
2011-02-12	Fiji	35 – 10	Australia
2011-02-12	Scotland	21 – 19	Canada

=== Pool D ===
Team	Pld	W	D	L	PF	PA	+/-	Pts
South Africa	3	2	1	0	69	12	+57	8
Samoa	3	2	1	0	66	26	+40	8
United States	3	1	0	2	41	62	−21	5
Japan	3	0	0	3	14	90	−76	3

Date	Team 1	Score	Team 2
2011-02-12	Samoa	31 – 7	Japan
2011-02-12	South Africa	27 – 5	United States
2011-02-12	Samoa	28 – 12	United States
2011-02-12	South Africa	35 – 0	Japan
2011-02-12	Samoa	7 – 7	South Africa
2011-02-12	United States	24 – 7	Japan

== Knockout ==
=== Shield ===
Quarter-finals
February 13 – Sam Boyd Stadium, Las Vegas
France	19
Uruguay	12
February 13 – Sam Boyd Stadium, Las Vegas
United States	15
Canada	19
February 13 – Sam Boyd Stadium, Las Vegas
Scotland	28
Japan	7
February 13 – Sam Boyd Stadium, Las Vegas
Wales	54
Guyana	0

Semi-finals
February 13 – Sam Boyd Stadium, Las Vegas
Uruguay	7
United States	27
February 13 – Sam Boyd Stadium, Las Vegas
Japan	24
Guyana	7

Final
February 13 – Sam Boyd Stadium, Las Vegas
United States	19
Japan	12

=== Bowl ===
Quarter-finals
February 13 – Sam Boyd Stadium, Las Vegas
France	19
Uruguay	12
February 13 – Sam Boyd Stadium, Las Vegas
United States	15
Canada	19
February 13 – Sam Boyd Stadium, Las Vegas
Scotland	28
Japan	7
February 13 – Sam Boyd Stadium, Las Vegas
Wales	54
Guyana	0

Semi-finals
February 13 – Sam Boyd Stadium, Las Vegas
France	14
Canada	22
February 13 – Sam Boyd Stadium, Las Vegas
Scotland	17
Wales	12

Final
February 13 – Sam Boyd Stadium, Las Vegas
Canada	14
Scotland	19

=== Plate ===
Quarter-finals
February 12 – Sam Boyd Stadium, Las Vegas
England	28
Kenya	14
February 12 – Sam Boyd Stadium, Las Vegas
South Africa	19
Australia	14
February 12 – Sam Boyd Stadium, Las Vegas
New Zealand	47
Argentina	7
February 12 – Sam Boyd Stadium, Las Vegas
Fiji	17
Samoa	12

Semi-finals
February 13 – Sam Boyd Stadium, Las Vegas
Kenya	24
Australia	21
February 13 – Sam Boyd Stadium, Las Vegas
Argentina	14
Samoa	26

Final
February 13 – Sam Boyd Stadium, Las Vegas
Kenya	15
Samoa	26

=== Cup ===
Quarter-finals
February 12 – Sam Boyd Stadium, Las Vegas
England	28
Kenya	14
February 12 – Sam Boyd Stadium, Las Vegas
South Africa	19
Australia	14
February 12 – Sam Boyd Stadium, Las Vegas
New Zealand	47
Argentina	7
February 12 – Sam Boyd Stadium, Las Vegas
Fiji	17
Samoa	12

Semi-finals
February 13 – Sam Boyd Stadium, Las Vegas
England	10
South Africa	17
February 13 – Sam Boyd Stadium, Las Vegas
New Zealand	7
Fiji	26

Final
February 13 – Sam Boyd Stadium, Las Vegas
South Africa	24
Fiji	14

Preceded by Wellington Sevens	USA Sevens; 2011	Succeeded by 2011 Hong Kong Sevens
