= 2010–11 IRB Sevens World Series =

2010–11 IRB Sevens
- Series XII
- Hosts: United Arab Emirates; South Africa; New Zealand; United States; Hong Kong; Australia; England; Scotland
- Date: 3 December 2010 - 29 May 2011

Final positions
- Champions: New Zealand
- Runners-up: South Africa
- Third: England

The 2010–11 IRB Sevens World Series was the 12th annual IRB Sevens World Series of rugby union sevens tournaments for full national sides run by the International Rugby Board since 1999–2000.

Sevens is traditionally played in a two-day tournament format. However, the most famous event, the Hong Kong Sevens, was played over three days, largely because it involved 24 teams instead of the normal 16.

== Itinerary ==
The IRB announced dates for the 2010–11 events on 1 June 2010, only two days after the final event of the 2009–10 series, the Edinburgh Sevens. The stops remained unchanged from recent years; the only scheduling change for 2010–11 was that the Adelaide event, which moved from its traditional slot of one week after Hong Kong to one week before in 2010, returned to its prior slot for 2011.

This was the last season for the South Africa leg in George and the Australia leg in Adelaide. On 13 April 2011, both countries' national unions announced that their respective legs of the series would move to new sites for 2011–12. The South Africa Sevens will move to Nelson Mandela Bay Stadium in Port Elizabeth. The Australia leg will move to Skilled Park in the Gold Coast; it was initially known as the "International Rugby Sevens Gold Coast", but later rebranded simply as the "Gold Coast Sevens".

2010–11 Itinerary
Leg	Venue	Date	Winner
Dubai	The Sevens	3–4 December 2010	England
South Africa	Outeniqua Park, George	10–11 December 2010	New Zealand
New Zealand	Westpac Stadium, Wellington	4–5 February 2011	New Zealand
United States	Sam Boyd Stadium, Las Vegas	12–13 February 2011	South Africa
Hong Kong	Hong Kong Stadium	25–27 March 2011	New Zealand
Australia	Adelaide Oval, Adelaide	2–3 April 2011	New Zealand
London	Twickenham	21–22 May 2011	South Africa
Edinburgh	Murrayfield, Edinburgh	28–29 May 2011	South Africa

== Core teams ==
Before each season, the IRB announces the 12 "core teams" that received guaranteed berths in each event in that season's series. The core teams for 2010–11 were:

- Argentina
- Australia
- England
- Fiji
- France
- Kenya
- New Zealand
- Samoa
- Scotland
- South Africa
- United States
- Wales

The core teams were unchanged from 2009 to 2010.

== Points schedule ==
The season championship was determined by points earned in each tournament. The points allocations for all events were identical to those in the 2009–10 series, reflecting changes that the IRB made starting with that season:

16-team events (all except for Hong Kong)

- Cup winner (1st place): 24 points
- Cup runner-up: 20 points
- Losing Cup semifinalists: 16 points
- Plate winner (5th place): 12 points
- Plate runner-up: 8 points
- Losing Plate semifinalists: 6 points
- Bowl winner (9th place): 4 points

24-team event (Hong Kong)

- Cup winner: 30 points
- Cup runner-up: 25 points
- Losing Cup semifinalists: 20 points
- Plate winner (5th place): 16 points
- Plate runner-up: 10 points
- Losing Plate semifinalists: 8 points
- Bowl winner (9th place): 5 points

== Tournament structure ==
In all tournaments except Hong Kong, 16 teams participated. Due to its place as the sport's most prestigious annual event, the Hong Kong tournament had 24 teams. In each 16-team tournament, the teams were divided into pools of four teams, who played a round-robin within the pool. Points were awarded in each pool on a different schedule from most rugby tournaments—3 for a win, 2 for a draw, 1 for a loss. The first tiebreaker was the head-to-head result between the tied teams, followed by difference in points scored during the tournament.

Four trophies were awarded in each tournament. In descending order of prestige, they were the Cup, whose winner was the overall tournament champion, Plate, Bowl and Shield. The Shield was contested in Hong Kong for the first time in 2010. Each trophy was awarded at the end of a knockout tournament.

In a 16-team tournament, the top two teams in each pool advanced to the Cup competition. The four quarterfinal losers dropped into the bracket for the Plate. The Bowl was contested by the third- and fourth-place finishers in each pool, with the losers in the Bowl quarterfinals dropping into the bracket for the Shield.

The Hong Kong Sevens adopted a new structure effective with its 2010 edition. As in previous years, the 24 teams were divided into six pools of four teams each, with the competition points system and tiebreakers identical to those for a 16-team event. Also as in the past, the six pool winners and the two top second-place finishers advanced to the Cup competition.

- The Plate competition was contested by the losing quarterfinalists from the Cup, as in all other events in the series.
- The Bowl was contested by the four remaining second-place finishers and the top four third-place finishers.
- The Shield was contested by the remaining eight entrants.

== Final standings ==
The points awarded to teams at each event, as well as the overall season totals, are shown in the table below. Gold indicates the event champions. Silver indicates the event runner-ups. A zero (0) is recorded in the event column where a team competed in a tournament but did not gain any points. A dash (–) is recorded in the event column if a team did not compete at a tournament.

2010–11 IRB Sevens – Series IX
Pos.	Event Team	Dubai	George	Wellington	Las Vegas	Hong Kong	Adelaide	London	Edinburgh	Points total
1	New Zealand	16	24	24	16	30	24	16	16	166
2	South Africa	12	12	8	24	16	20	24	24	140
3	England	24	20	20	16	25	16	0	6	127
4	Fiji	16	16	12	20	20	6	20	12	122
5	Samoa	20	16	16	12	20	16	12	8	120
6	Australia	8	6	16	6	10	6	8	20	80
7	Wales	6	6	6	0	0	12	16	16	62
8	Argentina	4	8	6	6	0	8	6	0	38
9	Kenya	0	0	4	8	0	0	0	4	16
10	Scotland	0	4	0	4	0	0	4	0	12
11	France	0	0	0	0	0	0	6	6	12
12	United States	6	0	0	0	0	4	0	0	10
13	Russia	0	0	–	–	8	–	0	0	8
14	Portugal	0	0	–	–	8	–	0	0	8
15	Canada	–	–	0	0	5	–	0	0	5

Legend
Gold	Event Champions
Silver	Event Runner-ups
Light blue line on the left indicates a core team eligible to participate in all events of the series.

== Player scoring ==
=== Individual points ===
Individual points
Pos.	Player	Country	Points
1	Cecil Afrika	South Africa	381
2	Tomasi Cama	New Zealand	299
3	Ben Gollings	England	278
4	Hamish Angus	Australia	240
5	Andrew Skeen	Scotland	201
6	Emosi Vucago	Fiji	195
7	Bernard Foley	Australia	123
8	Frank Halai	New Zealand	175
9	Dan Norton	England	164
10	Gonzalo Gutierrez Taboada	Argentina	159

=== Individual tries ===
Individual tries
Pos.	Player	Country	Tries
1	Cecil Afrika	South Africa	40
2	Frank Halai	New Zealand	35
3	Dan Norton	England	32
4	Humphrey Kayange	Kenya	31
5-tie	Seremaia Burotu	Fiji	29
5-tie	Collins Injera	Kenya	29
7	Toby Arnold	New Zealand	27
8-tie	Bernard Foley	Australia	26
8-tie	Declan O'Donnell	New Zealand	26

== Tournaments ==
=== Dubai ===
Event	Winners	Score	Finalists	Semi Finalists
Cup	England	29 – 21	Samoa	Fiji; New Zealand
Plate	South Africa	19 – 12	Australia	United States; Wales
Bowl	Argentina	21 – 0	Zimbabwe	Russia; Scotland
Shield	Kenya	26 – 0	France	Portugal; Arabian Gulf

=== South Africa ===
Event	Winners	Score	Finalists	Semi Finalists
Cup	New Zealand	22 – 19	England	Samoa; Fiji
Plate	South Africa	10 – 5	Argentina	Wales; Australia
Bowl	Scotland	26 – 0	Russia	Portugal; France
Shield	Zimbabwe	14 – 5	Kenya	Namibia; United States

=== New Zealand ===
Event	Winners	Score	Finalists	Semi Finalists
Cup	New Zealand	29 – 14	England	Samoa; Australia
Plate	Fiji	26 – 12	South Africa	Argentina; Wales
Bowl	Kenya	19 – 0	Tonga	Scotland; Cook Islands
Shield	United States	19 – 12	France	Canada; Papua New Guinea

=== United States ===
Event	Winners	Score	Finalists	Semi Finalists
Cup	South Africa	24 – 14	Fiji	England; New Zealand
Plate	Samoa	26 – 15	Kenya	Australia; Argentina
Bowl	Scotland	19 – 14	Canada	France; Wales
Shield	United States	19 – 12	Japan	Uruguay; Guyana

=== Hong Kong ===
Event	Winners	Score	Finalists	Semi Finalists	Quarter Finalists
Cup	New Zealand	29 – 17	England	Fiji; Samoa	
Plate	South Africa	26 – 19	Australia	Portugal; Russia	
Bowl	Canada	35 – 12	Japan	United States; Wales	Scotland; Tonga; France; Argentina
Shield	Kenya	17 – 12	Spain	China; Zimbabwe	Malaysia; Hong Kong; South Korea; Mexico

=== Australia ===
Event	Winners	Score	Finalists	Semi Finalists
Cup	New Zealand	28 – 20	South Africa	England; Samoa
Plate	Wales	14 – 7	Argentina	Australia; Fiji
Bowl	United States	17 – 10	Kenya	France; Scotland
Shield	Japan	22 – 5	Tonga	Cook Islands; Papua New Guinea

=== England ===
Event	Winners	Score	Finalists	Semi Finalists
Cup	South Africa	24 – 14	Fiji	New Zealand; Wales
Plate	Samoa	22 – 12	Australia	Argentina; France
Bowl	Scotland	21 – 19	Kenya	Spain; Russia
Shield	England	22 – 7	Portugal	United States; Canada

=== Scotland ===
Event	Winners	Score	Finalists	Semi Finalists
Cup	South Africa	36 – 35	Australia	Wales; New Zealand
Plate	Fiji	26 – 14	Samoa	England; France
Bowl	Kenya	21 – 14	Scotland	Spain; Argentina
Shield	Canada	17 – 12	Russia	United States; Portugal
