= Scotland Sevens =

Rugby sevens tournament

- Most recent season or competition: 2014 Scotland Sevens
- Scotland Sevens logo
- Formerly: Edinburgh Sevens
- Sport: Rugby sevens
- Founded: 2007
- No. of teams: 16
- Country: Scotland
- Venue: Scotstoun Stadium
- Most recent champion: Fiji (2015)
- Most titles: New Zealand (4 times)
- Sponsor: Emirates

The Scotland Sevens was a rugby sevens tournament that was part of the Sevens World Series. In the 2014-15 season it was the penultimate event of the Sevens World Series circuit. It was first held in 2007 but has been removed from the series from the 2015-16 season.

Between 2007 and 2011 the tournament was held at Murrayfield in Edinburgh, then moving to Scotstoun Stadium in Glasgow from 2012. The agreement to host the tournament in Glasgow between the World Rugby, which operates the Sevens World Series, and the Scottish Rugby Union ran from 2012 for at least 3 years. The event was replaced in the World Sevens series by the France Sevens event from 2015–16 and will not return to the series until 2019 at the earliest.

The first and second tournaments were held near the beginning of June, with the airline Emirates as the title sponsor. Associated events have included a Festival of Rugby, which took place on the training pitches outside Murrayfield when it was held there.

== Results ==
Year	Host	Cup Final			Plate Final		
Year	Host	Winner	Score	Runner-up	Winner	Score	Runner-up
2007	Murrayfield, Edinburgh	New Zealand	34–5	Samoa	Fiji	31–7	Kenya
2008	Murrayfield, Edinburgh	New Zealand	24–14	England	South Africa	14–5	Scotland
2009	Murrayfield, Edinburgh	Fiji	20–19	South Africa	New Zealand	34–12	Australia
2010	Murrayfield, Edinburgh	Samoa	41–14	Australia	Scotland	19–0	Argentina
2011	Murrayfield, Edinburgh	South Africa	36–35	Australia	Fiji	26–14	Samoa
2012	Scotstoun, Glasgow	New Zealand	29–14	England	Samoa	31–12	Wales
2013	Scotstoun, Glasgow	South Africa	28–21	New Zealand	United States	17–7	Argentina
2014	Scotstoun, Glasgow	New Zealand	54-7	Canada	England	26-5	Kenya
2015	Scotstoun, Glasgow	Fiji	24-17	New Zealand	South Africa	12-10	Scotland

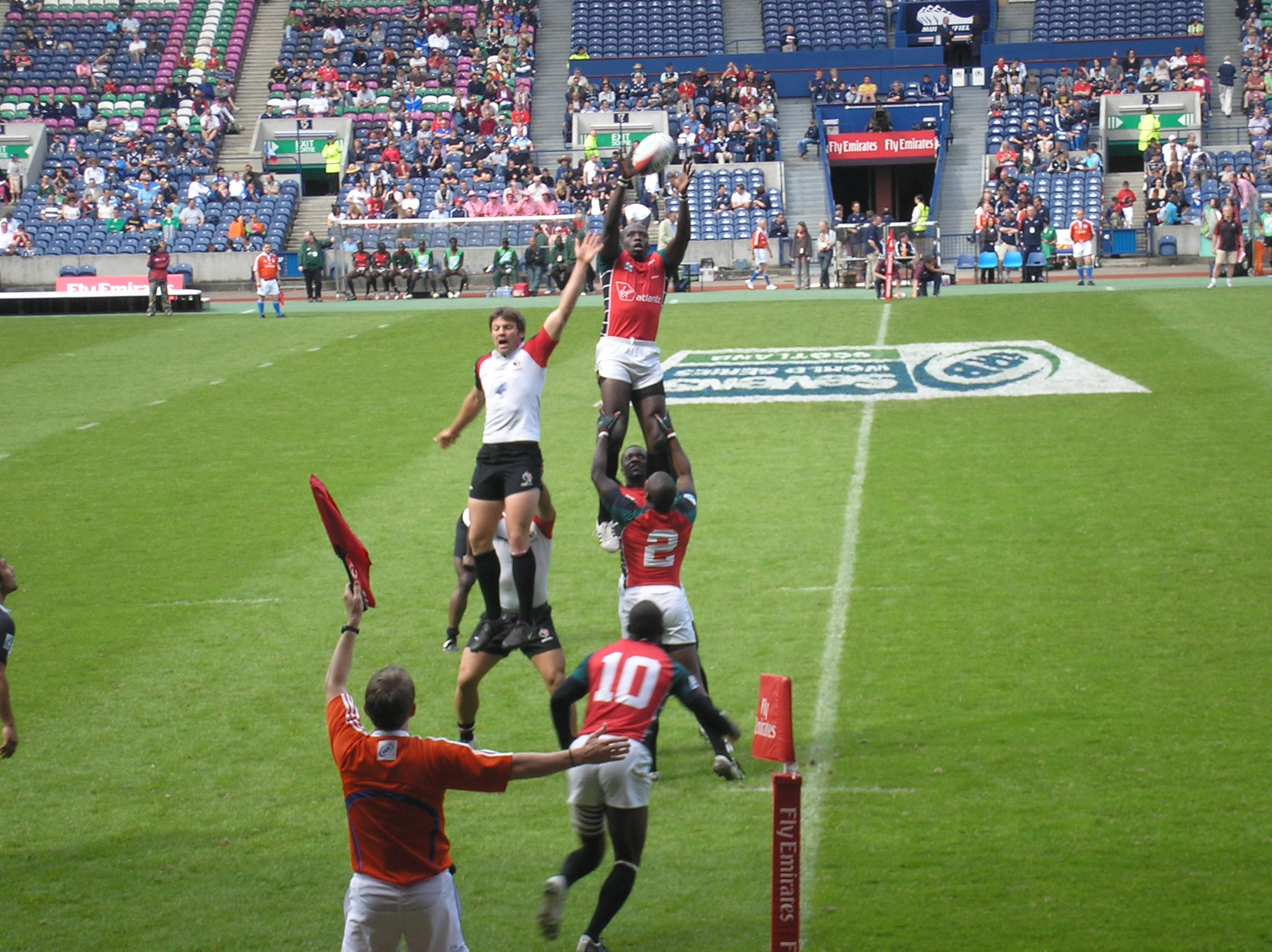
A lineout during the 2008 Edinburgh Sevens

== See also ==
- Melrose Sevens
