= 2010 Dubai Sevens =

World Rugby Sevens Series tournament

- Host nation: United Arab Emirates
- Date: 3–4 December 2010

Cup
- Champion: England
- Runner-up: Samoa
- Third: New Zealand

Plate
- Winner: South Africa
- Runner-up: Australia

Bowl
- Winner: Argentina
- Runner-up: Zimbabwe

Shield
- Winner: Kenya
- Runner-up: France

The Dubai Sevens is played annually as part of the IRB Sevens World Series for international rugby sevens (seven-a-side version of rugby union). The 2010 competition was held on December 3 and 4 at The Sevens. It was the first of eight events in the 2010–11 IRB Sevens World Series.

This was the third edition of the Dubai Sevens to be held at The Sevens. Previous editions were held at the Dubai Exiles Rugby Ground.

This was the final tournament for the host Arabian Gulf team. Following the tournament, the team and its governing body, the Arabian Gulf Rugby Football Union, disbanded in order to facilitate a major reorganisation of the sport in the region. As announced by the International Rugby Board in 2009, the AGRFU is being replaced by new national governing bodies in each of the union's member countries.

== Format ==
The tournament consisted of four round-robin pools of four teams. All sixteen teams progressed to the knockout stage. The top two teams from each group progressed to quarter-finals in the main competition, with the winners of those quarter-finals competed in cup semi-finals and the losers competed in plate semi-finals. The bottom two teams from each group progressed to quarter-finals in the consolation competition, with the winners of those quarter-finals competed in bowl semi-finals and the losers competed in shield semi-finals.

== Teams ==
All 16 teams from the 2009 Dubai Sevens were invited to participate in the 2010 tournament:

- Arabian Gulf
- Argentina
- Australia
- England
- Fiji
- France
- Kenya
- New Zealand
- Portugal
- Russia
- Samoa
- Scotland
- South Africa
- United States
- Wales
- Zimbabwe

== Pool stages ==
Key to colours in group tables
Team advanced to the Cup Quarter Final

=== Pool A ===
Team	Pld	W	D	L	PF	PA	+/-	Pts
Samoa	3	2	1	0	101	40	61	8
Wales	3	2	1	0	85	38	47	8
Kenya	3	1	0	2	50	62	-12	5
Arabian Gulf	3	0	0	3	36	132	-96	3

Date	Team 1	Score	Team 2
2010-12-03	Samoa	21 – 21	Wales
2010-12-03	Kenya	31 – 19	Arabian Gulf
2010-12-03	Samoa	54 – 12	Arabian Gulf
2010-12-03	Kenya	12 – 17	Wales
2010-12-03	Wales	47 – 5	Arabian Gulf
2010-12-03	Samoa	26 – 7	Kenya

=== Pool B ===
Team	Pld	W	D	L	PF	PA	+/-	Pts
New Zealand	3	3	0	0	114	26	88	9
United States	3	2	0	1	59	62	-3	7
Zimbabwe	3	1	0	2	36	101	-65	5
Argentina	3	0	0	3	52	72	-20	3

Date	Team 1	Score	Team 2
2010-12-03	New Zealand	31 – 7	United States
2010-12-03	Argentina	14 – 24	Zimbabwe
2010-12-03	New Zealand	59 – 0	Zimbabwe
2010-12-03	Argentina	19 – 24	United States
2010-12-03	United States	28 – 12	Zimbabwe
2010-12-03	New Zealand	24 – 19	Argentina

=== Pool C ===
Team	Pld	W	D	L	PF	PA	+/-	Pts
Australia	3	3	0	0	88	47	41	9
South Africa	3	1	1	1	52	48	4	6
Scotland	3	1	1	1	59	70	-11	6
Russia	3	0	0	3	39	73	-34	3

Date	Team 1	Score	Team 2
2010-12-03	Australia	41 – 14	Scotland
2010-12-03	South Africa	19 – 10	Russia
2010-12-03	Australia	28 – 19	Russia
2010-12-03	South Africa	19 – 19	Scotland
2010-12-03	Scotland	26 – 10	Russia
2010-12-03	Australia	19 – 14	South Africa

=== Pool D ===
Team	Pld	W	D	L	PF	PA	+/-	Pts
Fiji	3	2	0	1	87	38	49	7
England	3	2	0	1	62	47	15	7
Portugal	3	2	0	1	47	57	-10	7
France	3	0	0	3	31	85	-54	3

Date	Team 1	Score	Team 2
2010-12-03	Fiji	31 – 7	Portugal
2010-12-03	England	24 – 12	France
2010-12-03	Fiji	35 – 5	France
2010-12-03	England	12 – 14	Portugal
2010-12-03	Portugal	26 – 14	France
2010-12-03	Fiji	21 – 26	England

== Knockout ==
=== Shield ===
Quarter-finals
December 4 – The Sevens, Dubai
Kenya	0
Argentina	43
December 4 – The Sevens, Dubai
Portugal	7
Russia	10
December 4 – The Sevens, Dubai
Scotland	28
France	22
December 4 – The Sevens, Dubai
Zimbabwe	24
Arabian Gulf	14

Semi-finals
December 4 – The Sevens, Dubai
Kenya	19
Portugal	12
December 4 – The Sevens, Dubai
France	26
Arabian Gulf	19

Final
December 4 – The Sevens, Dubai
Kenya	26
France	0

=== Bowl ===
Quarter-finals
December 4 – The Sevens, Dubai
Kenya	0
Argentina	43
December 4 – The Sevens, Dubai
Portugal	7
Russia	10
December 4 – The Sevens, Dubai
Scotland	28
France	22
December 4 – The Sevens, Dubai
Zimbabwe	24
Arabian Gulf	14

Semi-finals
December 4 – The Sevens, Dubai
Argentina	31
Russia	7
December 4 – The Sevens, Dubai
Scotland	17
Zimbabwe	28

Final
December 4 – The Sevens, Dubai
Argentina	21
Zimbabwe	0

=== Plate ===
Quarter-finals
December 4 – The Sevens, Dubai
Samoa	38
United States	5
December 4 – The Sevens, Dubai
Fiji	21
South Africa	19
December 4 – The Sevens, Dubai
Australia	21
England	24
December 4 – The Sevens, Dubai
New Zealand	35
Wales	7

Semi-finals
December 4 – The Sevens, Dubai
United States	10
South Africa	24
December 4 – The Sevens, Dubai
Australia	26
Wales	12

Final
December 4 – The Sevens, Dubai
South Africa	19
Australia	12

=== Cup ===
Quarter-finals
December 4 – The Sevens, Dubai
Samoa	38
United States	5
December 4 – The Sevens, Dubai
Fiji	21
South Africa	19
December 4 – The Sevens, Dubai
Australia	21
England	24
December 4 – The Sevens, Dubai
New Zealand	35
Wales	7

Semi-finals
December 4 – The Sevens, Dubai
Samoa	24
Fiji	21
December 4 – The Sevens, Dubai
England	19
New Zealand	14

Final
December 4 – The Sevens, Dubai
Samoa	21
England	29

Preceded by Edinburgh Sevens	Dubai Sevens; 2010	Succeeded by George Sevens
