= 2010 South Africa Sevens =

The South Africa Sevens was played annually as part of the IRB Sevens World Series for international rugby sevens (seven-a-side version of rugby union). The 2010 competition was held on 10 December and 11 December at Outeniqua Park in George, Western Cape. It was the second of eight events in the 2010–11 IRB Sevens World Series.

This was the 12th edition of the South Africa Sevens, and also the ninth and last to be held in George. In April 2011, the South African Rugby Union announced that future editions of the tournament would be held at Nelson Mandela Bay Stadium in Port Elizabeth.

== Format ==
The tournament consisted of four round-robin pools of four teams. All sixteen teams progressed to the knockout stage. The top two teams from each group progressed to quarter-finals in the main competition, with the winners of those quarter-finals competing in cup semi-finals and the losers competing in plate semi-finals. The bottom two teams from each group progressed to quarter-finals in the consolation competition, with the winners of those quarter-finals competing in bowl semi-finals and the losers competing in shield semi-finals.

== Teams ==
These 16 teams were invited to participate in the 2010 tournament:

- Argentina
- Australia
- England
- Fiji
- France
- Kenya
- Namibia
- New Zealand
- Portugal
- Russia
- Samoa
- Scotland
- South Africa
- United States
- Wales
- Zimbabwe

== Pool stages ==
Key to colours in group tables
Teams that advanced to the Cup Quarter Final

=== Pool A ===
Pos	Team	Pld	W	D	L	PF	PA	PD	Pts
1	Wales	3	3	0	0	81	34	+47	9
2	Australia	3	2	0	1	64	40	+24	7
3	Scotland	3	1	0	2	35	52	−17	5
4	France	3	0	0	3	24	78	−54	3

Date	Team 1	Score	Team 2
2010-12-10	Australia	15–33	Wales
2010-12-10	Scotland	21–12	France
2010-12-10	Australia	28–0	France
2010-12-10	Scotland	7–19	Wales
2010-12-10	Wales	29–12	France
2010-12-10	Australia	21–7	Scotland

=== Pool B ===
Pos	Team	Pld	W	D	L	PF	PA	PD	Pts
1	Fiji	3	2	1	0	104	26	+78	8
2	Samoa	3	2	1	0	81	36	+45	8
3	United States	3	1	0	2	60	74	−14	5
4	Namibia	3	0	0	3	14	123	−109	3

Date	Team 1	Score	Team 2
2010-12-10	Samoa	24–22	United States
2010-12-10	Fiji	47–7	Namibia
2010-12-10	Samoa	43–0	Namibia
2010-12-10	Fiji	43–5	United States
2010-12-10	United States	33–7	Namibia
2010-12-10	Samoa	14–14	Fiji

=== Pool C ===
Pos	Team	Pld	W	D	L	PF	PA	PD	Pts
1	New Zealand	3	3	0	0	100	14	+86	9
2	England	3	2	0	1	47	30	+17	7
3	Russia	3	1	0	2	46	57	−11	5
4	Kenya	3	0	0	3	10	102	−92	3

Date	Team 1	Score	Team 2
2010-12-10	New Zealand	47–0	Kenya
2010-12-10	England	19–5	Russia
2010-12-10	New Zealand	33–7	Russia
2010-12-10	England	21– 5	Kenya
2010-12-10	Kenya	5–34	Russia
2010-12-10	New Zealand	20–7	England

=== Pool D ===
Pos	Team	Pld	W	D	L	PF	PA	PD	Pts
1	South Africa	3	3	0	0	100	12	+88	9
2	Argentina	3	2	0	1	59	29	+30	7
3	Portugal	3	1	0	2	26	83	−57	5
4	Zimbabwe	3	0	0	3	26	87	−61	3

Date	Team 1	Score	Team 2
2010-12-10	South Africa	38–0	Portugal
2010-12-10	Argentina	28–0	Zimbabwe
2010-12-10	South Africa	33–7	Zimbabwe
2010-12-10	Argentina	26–0	Portugal
2010-12-10	Portugal	26–19	Zimbabwe
2010-12-10	South Africa	29–5	Argentina

== Knockout ==
=== Shield ===
Quarter-finals
11 December – Outeniqua Park, George
Scotland	14
Namibia	5
11 December – Outeniqua Park, George
Portugal	7
Kenya	5
11 December – Outeniqua Park, George
Russia	25
Zimbabwe	7
11 December – Outeniqua Park, George
United States	17
France	19

Semi-finals
11 December – Outeniqua Park, George
Namibia	0
Kenya	41
11 December – Outeniqua Park, George
Zimbabwe	19
United States	17

Final
11 December – Outeniqua Park, George
Kenya	5
Zimbabwe	14

=== Bowl ===
Quarter-finals
11 December – Outeniqua Park, George
Scotland	14
Namibia	5
11 December – Outeniqua Park, George
Portugal	7
Kenya	5
11 December – Outeniqua Park, George
Russia	25
Zimbabwe	7
11 December – Outeniqua Park, George
United States	17
France	19

Semi-finals
11 December – Outeniqua Park, George
Scotland	14
Portugal	10
11 December – Outeniqua Park, George
Russia	34
France	0

Final
11 December – Outeniqua Park, George
Scotland	26
Russia	0

=== Plate ===
Quarter-finals
11 December – Outeniqua Park, George
Wales	14
Samoa	19
11 December – Outeniqua Park, George
South Africa	10
England	19
11 December – Outeniqua Park, George
New Zealand	26
Argentina	0
11 December – Outeniqua Park, George
Fiji	33
Australia	5

Semi-finals
11 December – Outeniqua Park, George
Wales	21
South Africa	22
11 December – Outeniqua Park, George
Argentina	14
Australia	12

Final
11 December – Outeniqua Park, George
South Africa	10
Argentina	5

=== Cup ===
Quarter-finals
11 December – Outeniqua Park, George
Wales	14
Samoa	19
11 December – Outeniqua Park, George
South Africa	10
England	19
11 December – Outeniqua Park, George
New Zealand	26
Argentina	0
11 December – Outeniqua Park, George
Fiji	33
Australia	5

Semi-finals
11 December – Outeniqua Park, George
Samoa	12
England	22
11 December – Outeniqua Park, George
New Zealand	26
Fiji	19

Final
11 December – Outeniqua Park, George
England	19
New Zealand	22

Preceded by Dubai Sevens	South Africa Sevens; 2010	Succeeded by Wellington Sevens
