= 2011 Wellington Sevens =

The Wellington Sevens is played annually as part of the IRB Sevens World Series for international rugby sevens (seven-a-side version of rugby union). The 2011 competition was held on February 4 and February 5 at Westpac Stadium. It was the third of eight events in the 2010–11 IRB Sevens World Series.

== Format ==
The tournament consisted of four round-robin pools of four teams. All sixteen teams progressed to the knockout stage. The top two teams from each group progressed to quarter-finals in the main competition, with the winners of those quarter-finals competing in cup semi-finals and the losers competing in plate semi-finals. The bottom two teams from each group progressed to quarter-finals in the consolation competition, with the winners of those quarter-finals competing in bowl semi-finals and the losers competing in shield semi-finals.

== Teams ==
These 16 teams were invited to participate in the 2010 tournament:

- Argentina
- Australia
- Canada
- Cook Islands
- England
- Fiji
- France
- Kenya
- New Zealand
- Papua New Guinea
- Samoa
- Scotland
- South Africa
- Tonga
- United States
- Wales

== Pool stages ==
Key to colours in group tables
| Teams that advanced to the Cup Quarter Final |

=== Pool A ===
| Team | Pld | W | D | L | PF | PA | +/- | Pts |
|---|---|---|---|---|---|---|---|---|
| England | 3 | 3 | 0 | 0 | 85 | 36 | +49 | 9 |
| Wales | 3 | 2 | 0 | 1 | 74 | 50 | +24 | 7 |
| United States | 3 | 1 | 0 | 2 | 36 | 81 | −45 | 5 |
| Cook Islands | 3 | 0 | 0 | 3 | 43 | 71 | −28 | 3 |

| Date | Team 1 | Score | Team 2 |
| 2011-02-04 | England | 31 – 12 | United States |
| 2011-02-04 | Wales | 31 – 12 | Cook Islands |
| 2011-02-04 | England | 21 – 17 | Cook Islands |
| 2011-02-04 | Wales | 36 – 5 | United States |
| 2011-02-04 | United States | 19 – 14 | Cook Islands |
| 2011-02-04 | England | 33 – 7 | Wales |

=== Pool B ===
| Team | Pld | W | D | L | PF | PA | +/- | Pts |
|---|---|---|---|---|---|---|---|---|
| New Zealand | 3 | 3 | 0 | 0 | 108 | 19 | +89 | 9 |
| Argentina | 3 | 2 | 0 | 1 | 43 | 58 | −15 | 7 |
| Papua New Guinea | 3 | 1 | 0 | 2 | 24 | 71 | −47 | 5 |
| Scotland | 3 | 0 | 0 | 3 | 38 | 65 | −27 | 3 |

| Date | Team 1 | Score | Team 2 |
| 2011-02-04 | New Zealand | 29 – 12 | Scotland |
| 2011-02-04 | Argentina | 14 – 10 | Papua New Guinea |
| 2011-02-04 | New Zealand | 45 – 0 | Papua New Guinea |
| 2011-02-04 | Argentina | 22 – 14 | Scotland |
| 2011-02-04 | Scotland | 12 – 14 | Papua New Guinea |
| 2011-02-04 | New Zealand | 34 – 7 | Argentina |

=== Pool C ===
| Team | Pld | W | D | L | PF | PA | +/- | Pts |
|---|---|---|---|---|---|---|---|---|
| Australia | 3 | 3 | 0 | 0 | 97 | 31 | +66 | 9 |
| Samoa | 3 | 2 | 0 | 1 | 46 | 50 | −4 | 7 |
| Tonga | 3 | 1 | 0 | 2 | 24 | 74 | −50 | 5 |
| Kenya | 3 | 0 | 0 | 3 | 50 | 62 | −12 | 3 |

| Date | Team 1 | Score | Team 2 |
| 2011-02-04 | Samoa | 24 – 21 | Kenya |
| 2011-02-04 | Australia | 47 – 7 | Tonga |
| 2011-02-04 | Samoa | 17 – 0 | Tonga |
| 2011-02-04 | Australia | 21 – 19 | Kenya |
| 2011-02-04 | Kenya | 10 – 17 | Tonga |
| 2011-02-04 | Samoa | 5 – 29 | Australia |

=== Pool D ===
| Team | Pld | W | D | L | PF | PA | +/- | Pts |
|---|---|---|---|---|---|---|---|---|
| Fiji | 3 | 2 | 1 | 0 | 87 | 7 | +80 | 8 |
| South Africa | 3 | 1 | 1 | 1 | 50 | 26 | +24 | 6 |
| Canada | 3 | 1 | 0 | 2 | 24 | 83 | −59 | 5 |
| France | 3 | 1 | 0 | 2 | 28 | 73 | −45 | 5 |

| Date | Team 1 | Score | Team 2 |
| 2011-02-04 | Fiji | 42 – 0 | France |
| 2011-02-04 | South Africa | 31 – 5 | Canada |
| 2011-02-04 | Fiji | 38 – 0 | Canada |
| 2011-02-04 | South Africa | 12 – 14 | France |
| 2011-02-04 | France | 14 – 19 | Canada |
| 2011-02-04 | Fiji | 7 – 7 | South Africa |

== Knockout ==
=== Shield ===
Quarter-finals
February 5 – Westpac Stadium, Wellington
United States | 7
Scotland | 24
February 5 – Westpac Stadium, Wellington
Canada | 14
Kenya | 19
February 5 – Westpac Stadium, Wellington
Tonga | 21
France | 19
February 5 – Westpac Stadium, Wellington
Papua New Guinea | 10
Cook Islands | 22

Semi-finals
February 5 – Westpac Stadium, Wellington
United States | 31
Canada | 7
February 5 – Westpac Stadium, Wellington
France | 52
Papua New Guinea | 12

Final
February 5 – Westpac Stadium, Wellington
United States | 19
France | 12

=== Bowl ===
Quarter-finals
February 5 – Westpac Stadium, Wellington
United States | 7
Scotland | 24
February 5 – Westpac Stadium, Wellington
Canada | 14
Kenya | 19
February 5 – Westpac Stadium, Wellington
Tonga | 21
France | 19
February 5 – Westpac Stadium, Wellington
Papua New Guinea | 10
Cook Islands | 22

Semi-finals
February 5 – Westpac Stadium, Wellington
Scotland | 12
Kenya | 15
February 5 – Westpac Stadium, Wellington
Tonga | 12
Cook Islands | 7

Final
February 5 – Westpac Stadium, Wellington
Kenya | 19
Tonga | 0

=== Plate ===
Quarter-finals
February 5 – Westpac Stadium, Wellington
England | 14
Argentina | 7
February 5 – Westpac Stadium, Wellington
Fiji | 5
Samoa | 12
February 5 – Westpac Stadium, Wellington
Australia | 14
South Africa | 7
February 5 – Westpac Stadium, Wellington
New Zealand | 26
Wales | 5

Semi-finals
February 5 – Westpac Stadium, Wellington
Argentina | 0
Fiji | 28
February 5 – Westpac Stadium, Wellington
South Africa | 22
Wales | 5

Final
February 5 – Westpac Stadium, Wellington
Fiji | 26
South Africa | 12

=== Cup ===
Quarter-finals
February 5 – Westpac Stadium, Wellington
England | 14
Argentina | 7
February 5 – Westpac Stadium, Wellington
Fiji | 5
Samoa | 12
February 5 – Westpac Stadium, Wellington
Australia | 14
South Africa | 7
February 5 – Westpac Stadium, Wellington
New Zealand | 26
Wales | 5

Semi-finals
February 5 – Westpac Stadium, Wellington
England | 7
Samoa | 5
February 5 – Westpac Stadium, Wellington
Australia | 0
New Zealand | 17

Final
February 5 – Westpac Stadium, Wellington
England | 14
New Zealand | 29

| Preceded by South Africa Sevens | Wellington Sevens; 2011 | Succeeded by USA Sevens |
