= Semi Kunatani =

Fiji international rugby union player (born 1990)

Semi Kunatani, OF
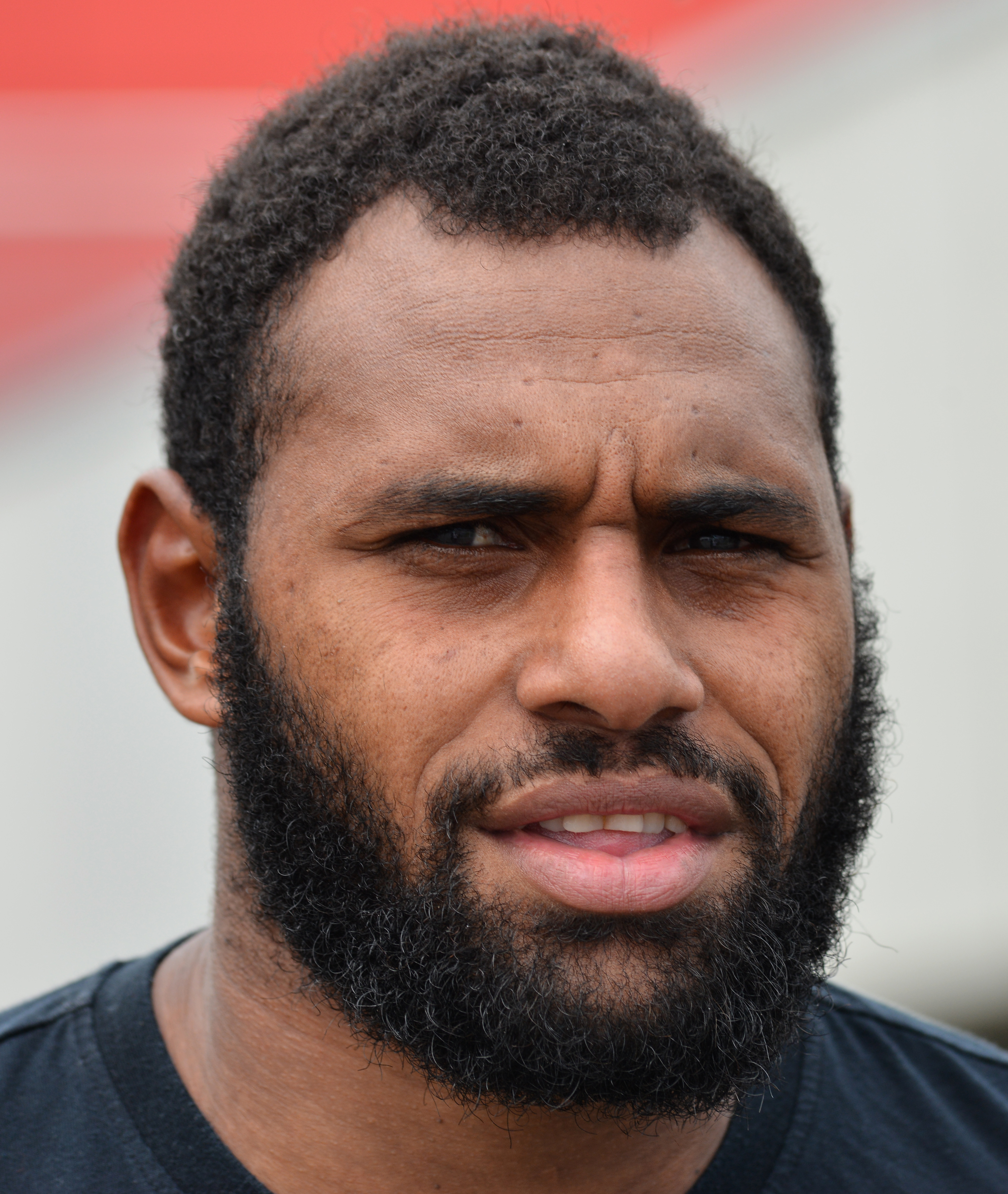
- Kunatani in 2017
- Born: 27 October 1990 (age 36) Nadi, Fiji
- Height: 1.92 m (6 ft 4 in)
- Weight: 100 kg (220 lb)

Rugby union career
- Position: Lock/Flanker
- Current team: Castre
Amateur team(s)
Years	Team	Apps	(Points)
- Yamacia
Senior career
Years	Team	Apps	(Points)
2015–2018	Toulouse	29	(25)
2018–2020	Harlequins	11	(15)
2020–	Castres		
International career
Years	Team	Apps	(Points)
2017	Fiji	10	(15)
National sevens team
Years	Team		Comps
2013–	Fiji		
Medal record
Men's rugby sevens
Representing Fiji
Olympic Games
Gold medal – first place	2016 Rio de Janeiro	Team competition
Commonwealth Games
Silver medal – second place	2022 Birmingham	Team competition

Semi Kunabuli Kunatani OF (born 27 October 1990) is a Fiji rugby union player. He plays for the Fiji sevens team and also the Tel Aviv Heat. He previously played for Top 14 side Castres and Top 14 side, Stade Toulousain and Premiership Rugby side Harlequins. Kunatani debuted for Fiji in 2013 Dubai Sevens tournament.

== Career ==
Kunatani started his career playing rugby in the local 7's competition. He played for the Yamacia 7's side and was selected by Ben Ryan to represent the Fiji National Sevens side in Dubai 2013, following the 2013 win at the Bayleys Fiji Coral Coast Sevens where he was a stand out player.

Semi's highs this 2014–2015 World Rugby Sevens season include having scored a total of 37 tries in the series thus far, being named in three World Rugby Dream Teams' (Gold Coast, Las Vegas and Glasgow) and most recently Semi was recognised by Sir Gordon Tietjens when he was named by Sir Gordon in his Hong Kong 7s Dream Team. Listing Semi Kunatani on his bench in an all time Best Sevens team, joining the likes of Waisale Serevi, Jonah Lomu, David Campese, Eric Rush and many other greats of the game.

Semi has signed with Toulouse in the French T14, beginning his career in the 2015–16 season and will continue to represent Fiji Sevens if and when selected by national coach Ben Ryan.

Semi became an Olympian at Rio 2016 playing in all 6 matches of the Olympics and helping Fiji win their first ever Olympic gold medal when Fiji thrashed Great Britain 43–7 in the final. Semi was a major factor in the final playing a significant role in 4 tries of the first half. This saw Semi join Osea KOLINISAU and Josua Tuisova in the Rio 7s Dream Team.

On 25 August 2018, Kuntani travels to England to join Harlequins in the Gallagher Premiership from the 2018–19 season.

He rejoined the Top 14 when he signed for Castres ahead of the 2020–21 season.

Kunatani was part of the Fiji sevens team that won a silver medal at the 2022 Commonwealth Games.

In 2023, he played for the international Israeli rugby side, the Tel Aviv Heat.

== Statistics ==
=== World Rugby Sevens Series ===
Season	Statistics		Final ranking	Tournaments played	(gold) Victory	(silver) Runners-up	(bronze) Third places
Season	Matches	Tries	Final ranking	Tournaments played	(gold) Victory	(silver) Runners-up	(bronze) Third places
2013–14	32	9	3rd	6/9	1 (United Arab Emirates) Dubai	0	2 (Scotland) Glasgow and (New Zealand) Wellington
2014–15	52	40	1st	9/9	4 (Australia) Gold Coast; (United States) Las Vegas; Hong Kong and (Scotland) Glasgow	0	3 (United Arab Emirates) Dubai; (Japan) Shibuya and (England) London
2015–16	12	5	-	2/6	0	0	2 (New Zealand) Wellington et (Australia) Sydney
Total	96	54	-	17	5	0	7

== Awards and honours ==
After the 2016 Summer Olympics, Kunatani was awarded the Officer of the Order of Fiji.
