= Stephan Dippenaar =

South African rugby union footballer

- Born: Stephanus Christiaan Dippenaar; 3 January 1988 (age 38) Moorreesburg, South Africa
- Height: 1.88 m (6 ft 2 in)
- Weight: 94 kg (207 lb; 14 st 11 lb)
- School: Paul Roos Gymnasium

Rugby union career
- Position: Outside-Centre / Winger
Provincial / State sides
Years	Team	Apps	(Points)
2008–2011	Blue Bulls	32	(30)
- Correct as of 28 March 2015
Super Rugby
Years	Team	Apps	(Points)
2008–2011	Bulls	21	(5)
- Correct as of 28 March 2015
International career
Years	Team	Apps	(Points)
2008	South Africa Under-20	2	(5)
2012–present	South Africa Sevens		
- Correct as of 28 March 2015
Medal record
Men's rugby sevens
Representing South Africa
World Games
Gold medal – first place	2013 Cali	Team competition

Stephanus Christiaan Dippenaar (born 3 January 1988) is a South African rugby union footballer. He currently represents the South Africa national sevens team in the IRB Sevens World Series. Between 2008 and 2011 he played for the Bulls in Super Rugby and the Blue Bulls in the Currie Cup and Vodacom Cup.

Dippenaar represented South Africa's under-19 team at the 2007 Under 19 Rugby World Championship in Ireland. In 2008, he played for South Africa's under-20 team at the Junior World Championship in Wales. He made his international sevens debut for the South African sevens team in 2012 at the Wellington Sevens.

In 2013, he was included in the squad for the 2013 Rugby World Cup Sevens. Dippenaar was injured at the 2015 Hong Kong Sevens and was replaced by Ruhan Nel. He had just recovered from an injury he sustained at the Gold Coast Sevens at the beginning of the series.

On 17 October 2017, Dippenaar announced his retirement from rugby on Twitter.
