= Jack Goodhue =

NZ rugby union player (born 1995)

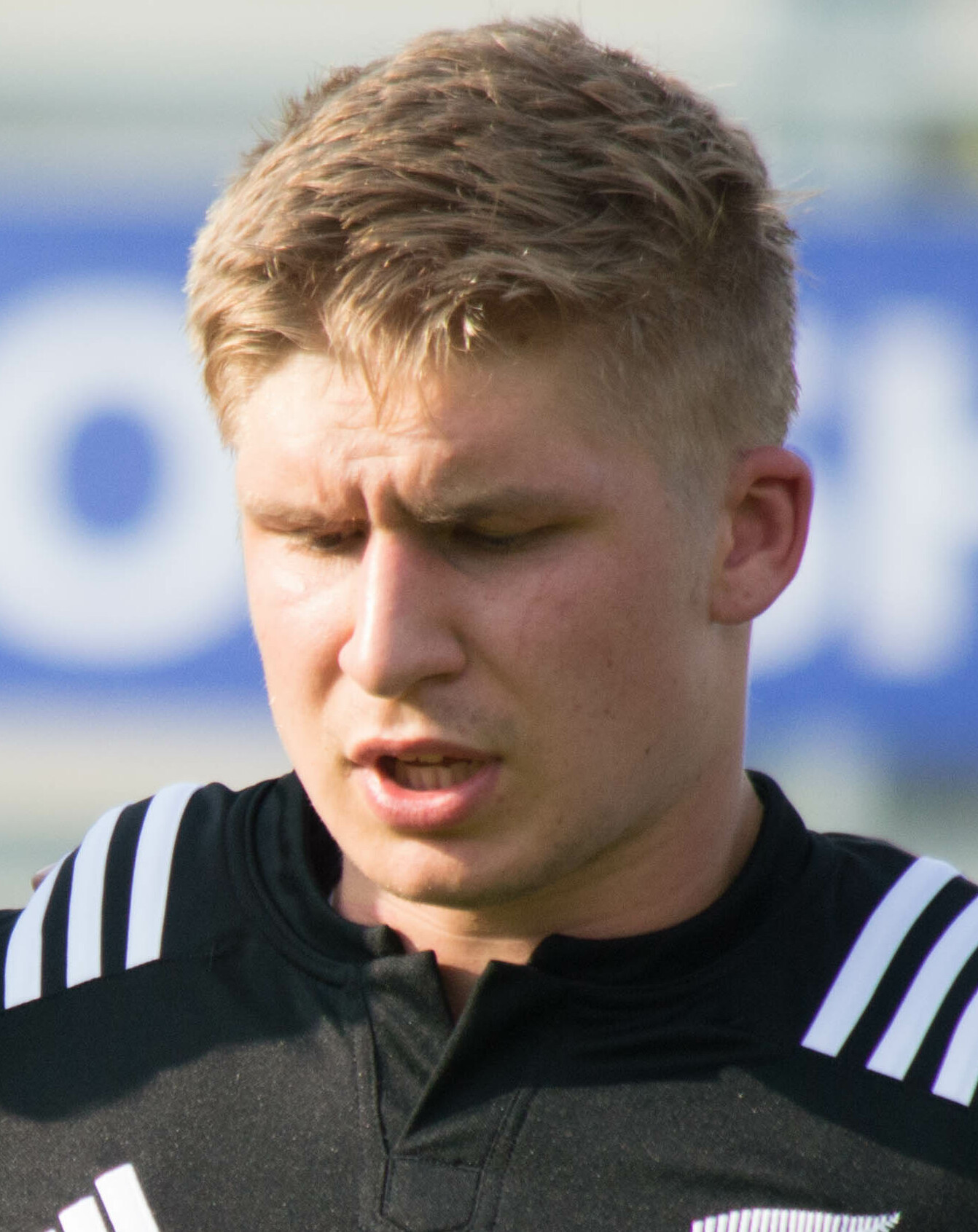
- Goodhue in 2015
- Full name: Elias Jack Goodhue
- Born: 13 June 1995 (age 31) Whangārei, New Zealand
- Height: 187 cm (6 ft 2 in)
- Weight: 100 kg (220 lb; 15 st 10 lb)
- School: Mount Albert Grammar School
- Notable relative(s): Cameron Goodhue (brother); Josh Goodhue (brother)

Rugby union career
- Position: Centre
- Current team: Castres Olympique
Senior career
| Years | Team | Apps | (Points) |
| 2014–2016 | Canterbury | 18 | (25) |
| 2017–2023 | Crusaders | 81 | (65) |
| 2017–2023 | Northland | 21 | (15) |
| 2023– | Castres Olympique | 25 | (15) |
- Correct as of 24 February 2025
International career
| Years | Team | Apps | (Points) |
| 2015 | New Zealand U20 | 7 | (10) |
| 2017–2020 | New Zealand | 19 | (15) |
| 2020 | South Island | 1 | (0) |
| 2023– | All Blacks XV | 1 | (5) |
- Correct as of 4 August 2024
National sevens team
| Years | Team | | Comps |
| 2015 | New Zealand | | 2 |
- Correct as of 23 August 2021

Elias Jack Goodhue (born 13 June 1995) is a New Zealand rugby union player who currently plays as a centre for Castres Olympique in the French Top 14.

== Early career ==
Originating from the Northland Region of New Zealand, Goodhue was born in the city of Whangarei and raised on a farm in Whananaki near Hikurangi, New Zealand, along with older brother Cameron and twin Josh who both went on to become professional rugby players. He attended Mount Albert Grammar School in Auckland along with his twin who captained their top side while Jack was vice captain as they won 17 of their 20 games in 2013. Following graduation, he moved to the South Island of New Zealand to study agriculture at Lincoln University and while there he played both Colts and Division 1 rugby for them, winning titles at both levels.

== Senior career ==
Despite not making the initial Canterbury squad for the 2014 ITM Cup, he forced his way into the side during the year and went on to make 5 appearances and score 2 tries for them before concussion ended his season early. After starting the first 2 games of the following season, he suffered ACL and MCL knee injuries in a game against Counties Manukau which ruled him out for almost a year.

He returned to full fitness for the 2016 Mitre 10 Cup and was in fine form with 3 tries in 11 games as Canterbury lifted their eighth Premiership title in nine years with a 43–27 victory over Tasman in the final.

== Super Rugby ==
Following his season ending injury in 2015, Goodhue was named a medical exemption player in the Crusaders wider training group ahead of the 2016 Super Rugby season. His extensive rehabilitation meant that he did not get on the field at all during the year, however his form for Canterbury in the latter part of 2016 meant that he was promoted to the full Crusaders squad for 2017 as part of a new deal which saw him contracted to the Christchurch-based franchise until 2019.

Goodhue was not expected to get as much game time as he eventually did in 2017, due to the presence of fellow rising star David Havili and the fact that All Black midfielder Seta Tamanivalu had shifted south to the Crusaders for the 2017 Super Rugby season, coming from the Chiefs. Goodhue became a regular starter for the Crusaders in his debut season however, with Tamanivalu changing positions to the left wing while Havili became the first choice fullback due to an Israel Dagg knee injury - leaving Goodhue as All Black Ryan Crotty's midfield partner for the majority of the season. Goodhue started in all three playoff rounds of the competition, scoring the Crusaders second try of the Grand Final in Johannesburg 11 minutes into the game, finishing his debut Super Rugby season with a 25–17 win over the Lions in the final.

On 10 June 2017, Goodhue started alongside Havili in a midfield partnership against the touring British & Irish Lions team. Goodhue lasted the whole 80 minutes, but the Crusaders ultimately lost 3–12.

In 2018 the Crusaders won their second title in two years where he started at centre against the Lions in a repeat of last years final. The Crusaders won 37–18.

Jack Goodhue was again a part of the Crusaders success in 2019 however he broke his finger against the Hurricanes in the semi-final. Because of this, Goodhue missed the final against the Jaguares who made it to the final for the first time. The Crusaders won 19-3 making it three straight titles for them and Jack Goodhue.

== International career ==
Goodhue represented the All Blacks Sevens twice in 2015 at the USA and Wellington competitions. He also won the 2015 World Rugby Under 20 Championship with New Zealand under-20, scoring two tries in five matches and captaining the side in one game.

Goodhue was included as injury cover for Ryan Crotty in the All Blacks 33 man squad for the 2017 Pasifika Challenge against Samoa and three test series against the British & Irish Lions. Goodhue and fellow uncapped midfielders Ngani Laumape and Jordie Barrett were surprise inclusions in the squad, with Highlanders midfielder Malakai Fekitoa excluded from the squad in their favour. Laumape, Barrett and Hurricanes loose forward Vaea Fifita made their debuts for the All Blacks in 2017's mid year tests but Goodhue ultimately did not play, with the All Blacks selectors recalling Fekitoa for the third test against the Lions following Crotty suffering another hamstring injury and Sonny Bill Williams' suspension.

Goodhue managed to make his way back into the All Blacks squad and was selected as part of the 2017 end of season tour. Goodhue was named to start at outside centre on his debut in a mid week fixture against a French side on 14 November 2017. Goodhue had a good game, but this was overshadowed by his yellow card in the 68th minute. Goodhue was one of five debutants that day, as they went on to win 28–23, however the match did not count as an official test match.

Goodhue made his official test debut on 23 June 2018 against France during the France test series where he started at outside centre. The All Blacks won 49–14.

Goodhue scored his first try for the All Blacks on 17 August 2018 against Australia.

== Honours ==
New Zealand Under 20

- World Rugby Under 20 Championship - 2015

New Zealand

- Rugby World Cup / Webb Ellis Cup
  - Third-place: 2019

Canterbury

- Mitre 10 Cup - 2015, 2016

Crusaders

- Super Rugby - 2017, 2018, 2019
- Super Rugby Aotearoa - 2020, 2021
