= Rugby sevens at the 2013 World Games =

2013 World Games; Rugby Sevens
| Host | (Colombia) Cali |
| Dates | August 1–2, 2013 |
| Teams | 8 |
Podium
| Champions | South Africa |
| Runners-up | Argentina |
| Third place | Canada |
| Fourth place | France |

Rugby sevens at the 2013 World Games was held from August 1 to August 2. Eight teams competed in the rugby sevens tournament held at the Estadio Olímpico Pascual Guerrero in Cali as part of the ninth World Games. South Africa won the gold medal, defeating silver medalists Argentina in the final by 33–24. Canada took the bronze medal, defeating France 33–21 in the play-off for third place. This was the last appearance of rugby sevens at the World Games due to the sport's inclusion in the Olympics.

== Teams ==
8 teams competed in this tournament:

- Argentina
- Brazil
- Canada
- Colombia
- France
- Hong Kong
- South Africa
- Uruguay

Team rosters

| Argentina | Brazil | Canada |
|---|---|---|
| Axel Mueller; Tomás Carrió; Anibal Panceyra Garrido; Diego Palma; Ramiro Finco; Agustin Cortez; Agustin Migliore; Tomas Lanfranconi; Ramiro Ignacio Chavez Teyssier; Joaquin Paz; Martin Nunez Lasalle; Gaston Revol | Pedro Henrique Lopes; Diego Martins Gimenez Lopez; Matheus da Cruz Daniel; Gustavo Barreiros Albuquerque; Martin Michael Schaffer; Bruno Garcia Silva; Lucas Rodrigues Duque; Felipe Claro Santana Silva; Moises Rodrigues Duque; Erick Monfrinatti Cogliandro; Allan Joseph Martins; Daniel Hubert Gregg | Jack Ingram Smith; Adam William Zaruba; Justin Samuel Douglas; Patrick John Kay; Jacob Webster; Lucas Hammond; Jorden Kevan Sandover-Best; Connor Jackson Braid; Clayton Meeres; Jordan Timothy Wilson; Michael Scholz; Adam Kleeberger |
| Colombia | France | Hong Kong |
| Jose Manuel Diosa Gomez; Johan Sebastian Zurique Borja; Carlos Eduardo Vasquez Montoya; Sebastian Mejia Gil; Emmanuel Bedoya Pulgarin; Juan Gabriel Davila Metaute; Carlos Chateau; Ivan Andres Gamero Diaz; Fausto Andres Mosquera Garces; Camilo Andres Barraera Gonzalez; Daniel Fernando Avellaneda Sanchez; Bryan Alexis Campino Riascos | Robinson Caire; Mathieu Halbwachs; Jean Blaise Lespinasse; Morad Touzini; Oleg Ishchenko; Terry Bouhraoua; Stephen Parez; Nicolas Pouplot; Jeremy Aicardi; Johan Demai-Hamecher; Kylan Hamdaoui; Garcia German Fracois | Anthony Nicholas Haynes; Joshua Robert Peters; Ka Chun Kwok; Lee Ross Jones; James Paul Hood; Rowan Varty; Kam Shing Yiu; Alexander Robert McQueen; Christopher Russell Maize; Nicholas Daniel Hewson; Thomas William McQueen; Benjamin Reihana Rimene |
| South Africa | Uruguay | |
| Bernado Botha; Jamba Ulengo; Cornal Hendricks; Stephan Dippenaar; Seabelo Senatla; Steven Hunt; Kyle Brown; Werner Kok; WJ Strydom; Mark Richards; Ruwellyn Isbell; Reuben Johannes | Gaston Horacio Gibernau Arredondo; Elias Feliz Regules Zubillaga; Santiago Martinez Etcheverry; Gabriel Puig; Andres Vilaseca; Guillermo Lijstenstein; Federico Favaro; Lucas Puig Carpaneto; Maximiliano Gonzalez Gomez; Juan Antonio de Freitas Turcatti; Alberto Tomas Peirano Penalva; Guillermo Demetrio del Cerro Lawlor | |

== Pools ==
=== Pool A ===
| Team | Pld | W | D | L | PF | PA | +/- |
|---|---|---|---|---|---|---|---|
| South Africa | 3 | 3 | 0 | 0 | 93 | 24 | +69 |
| Canada | 3 | 2 | 0 | 1 | 91 | 31 | +60 |
| Hong Kong | 3 | 1 | 0 | 2 | 57 | 62 | -5 |
| Colombia | 3 | 0 | 0 | 3 | 0 | 124 | -124 |

1 September 2013
12:30

| South Africa | 43 – 0 | Colombia |

Estadio Olímpico Pascual Guerrero

1 September 2013
12:55

| Canada | 31 – 12 | Hong Kong |

Estadio Olímpico Pascual Guerrero

=== Pool B ===
| Team | Pld | W | D | L | PF | PA | +/- |
|---|---|---|---|---|---|---|---|
| Argentina | 3 | 3 | 0 | 0 | 85 | 35 | +50 |
| France | 3 | 2 | 0 | 1 | 54 | 57 | -3 |
| Brazil | 3 | 1 | 0 | 2 | 29 | 55 | -26 |
| Uruguay | 3 | 0 | 0 | 3 | 50 | 71 | -21 |

== Knockout round ==
Results of the final phase.

=== Main tournament ===
Round 1
02 Aug 2013 11:00
South Africa | 36
Uruguay | 0
02 Aug 2013 11:25
Hong Kong | 12
France | 14
02 Aug 2013 11:50
Argentina | 49
Colombia | 5
02 Aug 2013 12:15
Brazil | 7
Canada | 26

Round 2
02 Aug 2013 14:30
South Africa | 33
France | 12
02 Aug 2013 15:00
Argentina | 19
Canada | 7

Round 3
02 Aug 2013 17:55
South Africa | 33
Argentina | 24
Third
02 Aug 2013 17:30
Canada | 33
France | 21

=== Classification ===
Classification Semifinals
Ranks 5-8 match – 02 Aug 2013 13:30
Uruguay | 7
Hong Kong | 17
Ranks 5-8 match – 02 Aug 2013 14:00
Colombia | 12
Brazil | 19

Classification Final
Ranks 5-6 match – 02 Aug 2013 16:30
Hong Kong | 22
Brazil | 7
Ranks 7/8
Ranks 7-8 match – 02 Aug 2013 16:00
Uruguay | 29
Colombia | 7

== See also ==
- Rugby sevens at the World Games
- List of 2013 World Games medal winners § Rugby Sevens
- Rugby sevens at the Summer Olympics
