= Ishchenko =

Ishchenko (Ukrainian: Іщенко) is a gender-neutral Ukrainian surname that may refer to

- Alex Ishchenko (born 1964), Australian rules footballer
- Andrey Ishchenko (born 1981), Russian politician
- Ivan Ishchenko (born 1980), Ukrainian wrestler
- Mykhaylo Ishchenko (born 1950), Soviet handball goalkeeper
- Mykola Ischenko (born 1983), Ukrainian football player
- Natalia Ishchenko (born 1986), Russian competitor in synchronized swimming
- Oleg Ishchenko (born 1994), French rugby union footballer
- Oleksandr Ishchenko (born 1953), Ukrainian football player
- Pavlo Ishchenko (born 1992), Ukrainian-Israeli boxer
- Yan Ishchenko (born 1980), Russian football player
