= 2015 Wellington Sevens =

- Sevens World Series XVI
- Host nation: New Zealand
- Date: 6–7 February 2015

Cup
- Champion: New Zealand
- Runner-up: England
- Third: South Africa

Plate
- Winner: Fiji
- Runner-up: Australia

Bowl
- Winner: France
- Runner-up: Argentina

Shield
- Winner: Canada
- Runner-up: Samoa

Tournament details
- Matches played: 45
- Tries scored: 275 (average 6.11 per match)
- Most tries: (Scotland) Damien Hoyland (7)

The 2015 Wellington Sevens is the 16th edition of the tournament as part of the 2014–15 Sevens World Series. It is hosted in Wellington, New Zealand, at the Westpac Stadium.

== Format ==
The teams are divided into pools of four teams, who play a round-robin within the pool. Points are awarded in each pool on a different schedule from most rugby tournaments—3 for a win, 2 for a draw, 1 for a loss. The top two teams in each pool advance to the Cup competition. The four quarterfinal losers drop into the bracket for the Plate. The Bowl is contested by the third- and fourth-place finishers in each pool, with the losers in the Bowl quarterfinals dropping into the bracket for the Shield.

== Teams ==
The participating teams are:

- Argentina
- Australia
- Canada
- England
- Fiji
- France
- Japan
- Kenya
- New Zealand
- Papua New Guinea
- Portugal
- Samoa
- Scotland
- South Africa
- United States
- Wales

== Match officials ==
The match officials for the 2015 Wellington Sevens are as follows:

- Mike Adamson (Scotland)
- Federico Anselmi (Argentina)
- Nick Briant (New Zealand)
- Ben Crouse (South Africa)
- Richard Kelly (New Zealand)
- Anthony Moyes (Australia)
- Matt O'Brien (Australia)
- Marius van der Westhuizen (South Africa)

== Pool Stage ==
Key to colours in group tables
Teams that advanced to the Cup Quarterfinal

=== Pool A ===
Team	Pld	W	D	L	PF	PA	PD	Pts
United States	3	2	0	1	92	38	+54	7
South Africa	3	2	0	1	55	43	+12	7
France	3	2	0	1	64	60	+4	7
Japan	3	0	0	3	29	99	–70	3

6 February 2015
12:00

South Africa	5–22	France
	Report

Westpac Stadium, Wellington

6 February 2015
12:21

United States	40–5	Japan
	Report

Westpac Stadium, Wellington

6 February 2015
14:52

South Africa	24–7	Japan
	Report

Westpac Stadium, Wellington

6 February 2015
15:14

United States	38–7	France
	Report

Westpac Stadium, Wellington

6 February 2015
17:48

France	35–17	Japan
	Report

Westpac Stadium, Wellington

6 February 2015
18:10

South Africa	26–14	United States
	Report

Westpac Stadium, Wellington

=== Pool B ===
Team	Pld	W	D	L	PF	PA	PD	Pts
New Zealand	3	3	0	0	88	17	+71	9
England	3	2	0	1	61	29	+32	7
Canada	3	1	0	2	51	53	–2	5
Papua New Guinea	3	0	0	3	7	108	–101	3

6 February 2015
14:08

New Zealand	26–5	Canada
	Report

Westpac Stadium, Wellington

6 February 2015
14:30

England	29–0	Papua New Guinea
	Report

Westpac Stadium, Wellington

6 February 2015
17:04

New Zealand	38–7	Papua New Guinea
	Report

Westpac Stadium, Wellington

6 February 2015
17:26

England	27–5	Canada
	Report

Westpac Stadium, Wellington

6 February 2015
20:38

Canada	41–0	Papua New Guinea
	Report

Westpac Stadium, Wellington

6 February 2015
21:00

New Zealand	24–5	England
	Report

Westpac Stadium, Wellington

=== Pool C ===
Team	Pld	W	D	L	PF	PA	PD	Pts
Fiji	3	3	0	0	87	43	+44	9
Australia	3	2	0	1	70	19	+51	7
Wales	3	1	0	2	44	90	–46	5
Portugal	3	0	0	3	31	80	–49	3

6 February 2015
12:42

Australia	36–5	Wales
	Report

Westpac Stadium, Wellington

6 February 2015
13:03

Fiji	31–19	Portugal
	Report

Westpac Stadium, Wellington

6 February 2015
15:36

Australia	29–0	Portugal
	Report

Westpac Stadium, Wellington

6 February 2015
15:58

Fiji	42–19	Wales
	Report

Westpac Stadium, Wellington

6 February 2015
18:32

Wales	20–12	Portugal
	Report

Westpac Stadium, Wellington

6 February 2015
18:54

Australia	5–14	Fiji
	Report

Westpac Stadium, Wellington

=== Pool D ===
Team	Pld	W	D	L	PF	PA	PD	Pts
Kenya	3	2	0	1	54	59	–5	7
Scotland	3	2	0	1	49	45	+4	7
Argentina	3	1	1	1	66	49	+17	6
Samoa	3	0	1	2	47	63	–16	4

6 February 2015
13:24

Argentina	31–7	Kenya
	Report

Westpac Stadium, Wellington

6 February 2015
13:46

Scotland	14–12	Samoa
	Report

Westpac Stadium, Wellington

6 February 2015
16:20

Argentina	21–21	Samoa
	Report

Westpac Stadium, Wellington

6 February 2015
16:42

Scotland	14–19	Kenya
	Report

Westpac Stadium, Wellington

6 February 2015
19:54

Kenya	28–14	Samoa
	Report

Westpac Stadium, Wellington

6 February 2015
20:16

Argentina	14–21	Scotland
	Report

Westpac Stadium, Wellington

== Knockout stage ==
[Cup/Plate] The top two teams in each pool advance to the Cup/Plate competition.

The four Cup/Plate quarterfinal winners contest the Cup.

The four Cup/Plate quarterfinal losers drop into the bracket for the Plate.

[Bowl/Shield] The bottom two teams in each pool move on to the Bowl/Shield competition.

The four Bowl/Shield quarterfinal winners contest the Bowl.

The four Bowl/Shield quarterfinal losers drop into the bracket for the Shield.

=== Shield ===
The Bowl/Shield Quarter-finals losers (shown in italics below) play in the Semi-finals of the Shield. The winners play in the Bowl.

Quarter-finals
7 February 2015 – 12:00 – Westpac Stadium, Wellington
France	26
Samoa	19
7 February 2015 – 12:21 – Westpac Stadium, Wellington
Wales	41
Papua New Guinea	0
7 February 2015 – 12:42 – Westpac Stadium, Wellington
Argentina	38
Japan	5
7 February 2015 – 13:03 – Westpac Stadium, Wellington
Canada	0
Portugal	26

Semi-finals
7 February 2015 – 14:56 – Westpac Stadium, Wellington
**Samoa**	**47**
Papua New Guinea	5
7 February 2015 – 15:18 – Westpac Stadium, Wellington
Japan	21
**Canada**	**28**

Final
7 February 2015 – 18:53 – Westpac Stadium, Wellington
Samoa	10
**Canada**	**26**

=== Bowl ===
The Bowl/Shield Quarter-finals winners (shown in bold) contest the Bowl.

Quarter-finals
7 February 2015 – 12:00 – Westpac Stadium, Wellington
**France**	**26**
Samoa	19
7 February 2015 – 12:21 – Westpac Stadium, Wellington
**Wales**	**41**
Papua New Guinea	0
7 February 2015 – 12:42 – Westpac Stadium, Wellington
**Argentina**	**38**
Japan	5
7 February 2015 – 13:03 – Westpac Stadium, Wellington
Canada	0
**Portugal**	**26**

Semi-finals
7 February 2015 – 15:40 – Westpac Stadium, Wellington
**France**	**43**
Wales	0
7 February 2015 – 16:02 – Westpac Stadium, Wellington
**Argentina**	**47**
Portugal	12

Final
7 February 2015 – 19:23 – Westpac Stadium, Wellington
**France**	**29**
Argentina	5

=== Plate ===
The Cup/Plate Quarter-finals losers (shown in italics) play in the Semi-finals of the Plate.

Quarter-finals
7 February 2015 – 13:28 – Westpac Stadium, Wellington
United States	15
Scotland	19
7 February 2015 – 13:49 – Westpac Stadium, Wellington
Fiji	21
England	26
7 February 2015 – 14:10 – Westpac Stadium, Wellington
Kenya	5
South Africa	19
7 February 2015 – 14:31 – Westpac Stadium, Wellington
New Zealand	26
Australia	7

Semi-finals
7 February 2015 – 16:24 – Westpac Stadium, Wellington
United States	10
**Fiji**	**12**
7 February 2015 – 16:46 – Westpac Stadium, Wellington
Kenya	5
**Australia**	**21**

Final
7 February 2015 – 19:53 – Westpac Stadium, Wellington
**Fiji**	**24**
Australia	0

=== Cup ===
The Cup/Plate Quarter-finals winners (shown in bold) contest the Cup.

Quarter-finals
7 February 2015 – 13:28 – Westpac Stadium, Wellington
United States	15
**Scotland**	**19**
7 February 2015 – 13:49 – Westpac Stadium, Wellington
Fiji	21
**England**	**26**
7 February 2015 – 14:10 – Westpac Stadium, Wellington
Kenya	5
**South Africa**	**19**
7 February 2015 – 14:31 – Westpac Stadium, Wellington
**New Zealand**	**26**
Australia	7

Semi-finals
7 February 2015 – 17:12 – Westpac Stadium, Wellington
Scotland	19
**England**	**24**
7 February 2015 – 17:37 – Westpac Stadium, Wellington
South Africa	7
**New Zealand**	**17**

Final
7 February 2015 – 20:55 – Westpac Stadium, Wellington
England	21
**New Zealand**	**27**
Third place
7 February 2015 – 20:23 – Westpac Stadium, Wellington
Scotland	7
**South Africa**	**40**
