= 2014 Dubai Sevens =

World Rugby Sevens Series tournament

- Sevens World Series XVI
- Host nation: United Arab Emirates
- Date: 5–6 December 2014

Cup
- Champion: South Africa
- Runner-up: Australia
- Third: Fiji

Plate
- Winner: Argentina
- Runner-up: Scotland

Bowl
- Winner: Samoa
- Runner-up: France

Shield
- Winner: Canada
- Runner-up: Kenya

Tournament details
- Matches played: 45
- Tries scored: 278 (average 6.18 per match)

The 2014 Dubai Sevens was the second tournament within the 2014-2015 Sevens World Series. It was held over the weekend of 5–6 December 2014 at The Sevens Stadium in Dubai, United Arab Emirates.

== Format ==
The teams were drawn into four pools of four teams each. Each team played the other three teams in their pool once. The top two teams from each pool advance to the Cup/Plate brackets. The bottom two teams from each group go to the Bowl/Shield brackets.

== Teams ==
The 16 participating teams for the tournament:

- Argentina
- Australia
- Brazil
- Canada
- England
- Fiji
- France
- Japan
- Kenya
- New Zealand
- Portugal
- Samoa
- Scotland
- South Africa
- United States
- Wales

== Match officials ==
The match officials for the 2014 Dubai Sevens are as follows:

- Mike Adamson (Scotland)
- Federico Anselmi (Argentina)
- Nick Briant (New Zealand)
- Ben Crouse (South Africa)
- Richard Kelly (New Zealand)
- Anthony Moyes (Australia)
- Matt O'Brien (Australia)
- Marius van der Westhuizen (South Africa)

== Pool Stage ==
Key to colours in group tables
Teams that advanced to the Cup Quarterfinal

=== Pool A ===
Team	Pld	W	D	L	PF	PA	PD	Pts
Fiji	3	3	0	0	123	33	+90	9
Argentina	3	2	0	1	64	59	+5	7
France	3	1	0	2	52	94	−42	5
Brazil	3	0	0	3	24	77	−53	3

5 December 2014
09:44

Fiji	54–7	France
	Report

The Sevens, Dubai

5 December 2014
10:06

Argentina	17–5	Brazil
	Report

The Sevens, Dubai

5 December 2014
12:44

Fiji	36–5	Brazil
	Report

The Sevens, Dubai

5 December 2014
13:06

Argentina	26–21	France
	Report

The Sevens, Dubai

5 December 2014
16:30

France	24–14	Brazil
	Report

The Sevens, Dubai

5 December 2014
16:52

Fiji	33–21	Argentina
	Report

The Sevens, Dubai

=== Pool B ===
Team	Pld	W	D	L	PF	PA	PD	Pts
New Zealand	3	3	0	0	120	0	+120	9
Scotland	3	2	0	1	68	57	+11	7
Samoa	3	1	0	2	52	74	−22	5
Japan	3	0	0	3	12	121	−109	3

5 December 2014
10:30

Samoa	14–21	Scotland
	Report

The Sevens, Dubai

5 December 2014
10:52

New Zealand	36–0	Japan
	Report

The Sevens, Dubai

5 December 2014
13:30

Samoa	38–12	Japan
	Report

The Sevens, Dubai

5 December 2014
13:52

New Zealand	43–0	Scotland
	Report

The Sevens, Dubai

5 December 2014
19:25

Scotland	47–0	Japan
	Report

The Sevens, Dubai

5 December 2014
19:47

Samoa	0–41	New Zealand
	Report

The Sevens, Dubai

=== Pool C ===
Team	Pld	W	D	L	PF	PA	PD	Pts
Australia	3	3	0	0	67	27	+40	9
England	3	2	0	1	62	22	+40	7
United States	3	1	0	2	46	62	−16	5
Kenya	3	0	0	3	29	93	−64	3

5 December 2014
11:14

England	19–10	United States
	Report

The Sevens, Dubai

5 December 2014
11:36

Australia	29–12	Kenya
	Report

The Sevens, Dubai

5 December 2014
14:14

England	38–0	Kenya
	Report

The Sevens, Dubai

5 December 2014
14:36

Australia	26–10	United States
	Report

The Sevens, Dubai

5 December 2014
20:09

United States	26–17	Kenya
	Report

The Sevens, Dubai

5 December 2014
20:31

England	5–12	Australia
	Report

The Sevens, Dubai

=== Pool D ===
Team	Pld	W	D	L	PF	PA	PD	Pts
South Africa	3	3	0	0	72	17	+55	9
Wales	3	1	0	2	47	52	−5	5
Portugal	3	1	0	2	47	69	−22	5
Canada	3	1	0	2	38	64	−26	5

5 December 2014
09:00

South Africa	36–0	Portugal
	Report

The Sevens, Dubai

5 December 2014
09:22

Wales	14–19	Canada
	Report

The Sevens, Dubai

5 December 2014
12:00

South Africa	24–12	Canada
	Report

The Sevens, Dubai

5 December 2014
12:22

Wales	26–21	Portugal
	Report

The Sevens, Dubai

5 December 2014
15:46

Portugal	26–7	Canada
	Report

The Sevens, Dubai

5 December 2014
16:08

South Africa	12–7	Wales
	Report

The Sevens, Dubai

== Knockout stage ==
=== Shield ===
Quarter-finals
6 December 2014 – 09:30 – The Sevens, Dubai
France	42
Canada	19
6 December 2014 – 09:52 – The Sevens, Dubai
United States	14
Japan	12
6 December 2014 – 10:14 – The Sevens, Dubai
Portugal	19
Brazil	0
6 December 2014 – 10:36 – The Sevens, Dubai
Samoa	40
Kenya	5

Semi-finals
6 December 2014 – 13:38 – The Sevens, Dubai
Canada	29
Japan	14
6 December 2014 – 14:00 – The Sevens, Dubai
Brazil	7
Kenya	22

Final
6 December 2014 – 18:14 – The Sevens, Dubai
Canada	19
Kenya	12

=== Bowl ===
Quarter-finals
6 December 2014 – 09:30 – The Sevens, Dubai
France	42
Canada	19
6 December 2014 – 09:52 – The Sevens, Dubai
United States	14
Japan	12
6 December 2014 – 10:14 – The Sevens, Dubai
Portugal	19
Brazil	0
6 December 2014 – 10:36 – The Sevens, Dubai
Samoa	40
Kenya	5

Semi-finals
6 December 2014 – 14:22 – The Sevens, Dubai
France	24
United States	15
6 December 2014 – 14:44 – The Sevens, Dubai
Portugal	14
Samoa	19

Final
6 December 2014 – 18:42 – The Sevens, Dubai
France	21
Samoa	31

=== Plate ===
Quarter-finals
6 December 2014 – 11:00 – The Sevens, Dubai
Fiji	31
Wales	17
6 December 2014 – 11:22 – The Sevens, Dubai
Australia	22
Scotland	17
6 December 2014 – 11:44 – The Sevens, Dubai
South Africa	40
Argentina	0
6 December 2014 – 12:06 – The Sevens, Dubai
New Zealand	29
England	7

Semi-finals
6 December 2014 – 16:11 – The Sevens, Dubai
Wales	7
Scotland	31
6 December 2014 – 16:33 – The Sevens, Dubai
Argentina	21
England	19

Final
6 December 2014 – 19:10 – The Sevens, Dubai
Scotland	12
Argentina	26

=== Cup ===
Quarter-finals
6 December 2014 – 11:00 – The Sevens, Dubai
Fiji	31
Wales	17
6 December 2014 – 11:22 – The Sevens, Dubai
Australia	22
Scotland	17
6 December 2014 – 11:44 – The Sevens, Dubai
South Africa	40
Argentina	0
6 December 2014 – 12:06 – The Sevens, Dubai
New Zealand	29
England	7

Semi-finals
6 December 2014 – 16:55 – The Sevens, Dubai
Fiji	24
Australia	29
6 December 2014 – 17:17 – The Sevens, Dubai
South Africa	28
New Zealand	0

Final
6 December 2014 – 20:12 – The Sevens, Dubai
Australia	7
South Africa	33
Third place
6 December 2014 – 19:40 – The Sevens, Dubai
Fiji	26
New Zealand	12
