= Savenaca Rawaca =

Fiji international rugby union player (born 1991)

- Born: 20 August 1991 (age 35)
- Height: 1.89 m (6 ft 2 in)
- Weight: 105 kg (16 st 7 lb)

Rugby union career
- Position: winger
International career
| Years | Team | Apps | (Points) |
| 2016– | Fiji | 1 | (0) |
- Correct as of 24 June 2016
National sevens team
| Years | Team | | Comps |
- Fiji
Medal record
Men's rugby sevens
Representing Fiji
Summer Olympics
| Gold medal – first place | 2016 Rio de Janeiro | Team competition |

Savenaca Rawaca, OF (born 20 August 1991) is a Fijian rugby union player. Renowned for his physicality and aggressiveness on the rugby field, he earned the nickname "Pitbull". He is currently playing for the Fiji sevens team. Rawaca made his debut for Fiji 7s at the 2014 Gold Coast Sevens. In August 2016, he was a part of the Fiji sevens men's rugby team that won a gold medal at the 2016 Summer Olympics in Rio de Janeiro.

== Career ==
Rawaca was born and raised in Navatu, Bua and he started his career playing rugby in the local sevens competition. He played for the Bua sevens team and was selected by Ben Ryan to represent the Fiji national sevens side in 2014 Gold Coast Sevens.

== Honours ==
Rawaca has been appointed an Officer of the Order of Fiji.
