= Brazil national rugby sevens team =

Brazil
- Union: Brazilian Rugby Confederation
- Nickname: Os Tupis
- Coach: Fernando Portugal
- Captain: Moises Duque
Team kit	Change kit

World Cup Sevens
- Appearances: 0

The Brazil national rugby sevens team competes at international level. Rugby sevens has grown in Brazil among rugby players. The country has competitive male and female squads. The sport in governed in Brazil by the Brazilian Rugby Confederation.

The Brazilian men's team finished 6th at the 2015 Pan American Games. The team hosted the 2016 Olympic tournament in Rio de Janeiro.

== Tournament history ==
=== Summer Olympic Games ===
Olympic Games record
Year	Round	Position	Pld	W	L	D
(Brazil) 2016	Placement round	12th	5	0	5	0
Total	Placement round	1/1	5	0	5	0

Olympic Games History
2016	Pool stage	Brazil 12 – 40 Fiji	Loss
2016	Pool stage	Brazil 0 – 26 United States	Loss
2016	Pool stage	Brazil 0 – 31 Argentina	Loss
2016	9–12th place playoff semi-finals	Brazil 12 – 24 United States	Loss
2016	9–12th place playoff Eleventh place	Brazil 0 – 24 Kenya	Loss

=== Pan American Games ===
Pan American Games record
Year	Round	Position	Pld	W	L	D
(Mexico) 2011 Guadalajara	Quarterfinals	7th	4	1	2	1
(Canada) 2015 Toronto	Quarterfinals	6th	5	2	3	0
Total	0 Title	2/2	9	3	5	1

=== South American Games ===
South American Games record
Year	Round	Position	Pld	W	L	D
(Chile) 2014 Santiago	Bronze Medal Game	4th	7	3	0	4
(Bolivia) 2018 Cochabamba	Bronze Medal Game	4th	6	3	1	2
Total	0 Title	2/2	13	6	1	6

=== World Games ===
World Games record
Year	Round	Position	Pld	W	L	D
(Japan) 2001 Akita	did not enter					
(Germany) 2005 Duisburg	did not enter					
(Chinese Taipei) 2009 Kaohsiung	did not enter					
(Colombia) 2013 Cali	5th to 8th Place	6th	6	2	4	0
Total	0 Titles	1/4	6	2	4	0

=== World Rugby Sevens Series ===
The 2012 USA Sevens tournament was the first time Brazil had competed in a World Series event since 2002. Brazil had a disappointing tournament, finishing 0-5. Brazil hoped to use the 2012 USA Sevens as a platform to continue to develop and grow sevens. Brazil fielded the least experienced team in the tournament, with Daniel Hubert Gregg the only Brazilian player with prior World Series experience.

As of the 2016-17 season, Brazil has lost all games in the World Series tournaments.

==== Results by season ====
2011–12 season
Year	Round	Position	Pld	W	L	D
(United States) 2012 Las Vegas	Shield	15th	5	0	5	0
Total	0 Titles	1/9	5	0	5	0

2014–15 season
Year	Round	Position	Pld	W	L	D
(United Arab Emirates) 2014 Dubai	Shield	15th	5	0	5	0
(United States) 2015 Las Vegas	Shield	15th	5	0	5	0
(England) 2015 London	Shield	15th	5	0	5	0
Total	0 Titles	3/9	15	0	15	0

2015–16 season
Year	Round	Position	Pld	W	L	D
2016 Canada	Shield	15th	5	0	5	0
(France) 2016 Paris	Shield	15th	5	0	5	0
(England) 2016 London	Shield	15th	5	0	5	0
Total	0 Titles	3/10	15	0	15	0

== Team ==
=== Previous squads ===
2015 London Sevens Squad
- Fernando Portugal
- Luca Rodriguez
- Moises Rodriguez
- Andre Nascimento Muniz Da Silva
- Juliano Ernani Fiori
- Lucas Domingues
- Gustavo Albuquerque
- Gabriel Motta
- Matt Gardner
- Lucas Muller
- Mateus Tavares Estrela
- Lucas Romeu

2016 Hong Kong Sevens Squad
- Daniel Henry Sancery
- Stefano Giantorno
- Juliano Ernani Fiori
- Felipe Silva
- David Neil Harvey
- Mateus Tavares Estrela
- Lucas Muller
- Matheus Silva
- Laurent Bourda Couhet
- Martin Schaefer
- Andre Nascimento Muniz Da Silva
- Felipe Henry Sancery

== See also ==
- Rugby union in Brazil
- Brazil national rugby union team
- Brazilian Rugby Confederation
