= 2014–15 Sevens World Series =

16th annual international series in men's rugby sevens

2014–15 World Rugby Sevens
- Series XVI
- Hosts: Australia; United Arab Emirates; South Africa; United States; New Zealand; Hong Kong; Japan; Scotland; England
- Date: 11 Oct 2014 – 17 May 2015

Final positions
- Champions: Fiji
- Runners-up: South Africa
- Third: New Zealand

The 2014–15 Sevens World Series, known for sponsorship reasons as the HSBC Sevens World Series, was the 16th annual series of rugby sevens tournaments for national rugby sevens teams. The Sevens World Series has been run by World Rugby since 1999–2000. This series also, for the first time, doubled as a qualifier for the 2016 Summer Olympics, with the top four national teams qualifying automatically.

== Itinerary ==
The schedule for the 2014–15 Series was released to the public in early March 2014.

2014–15 Itinerary
Leg	Stadium	City	Date	Winner
Australia	Cbus Super Stadium	Gold Coast	11–12 October 2014	Fiji
Dubai	The Sevens	Dubai	5–6 December 2014	South Africa
South Africa	Nelson Mandela Bay Stadium	Port Elizabeth	13–14 December 2014	South Africa
New Zealand	Westpac Stadium	Wellington	6–7 February 2015	New Zealand
United States	Sam Boyd Stadium	Las Vegas	13–15 February 2015	Fiji
Hong Kong	Hong Kong Stadium	Hong Kong	27–29 March 2015	Fiji
Japan	Chichibunomiya Stadium	Tokyo	4–5 April 2015	England
Scotland	Scotstoun Stadium	Glasgow	9–10 May 2015	Fiji
England	Twickenham Stadium	London	16–17 May 2015	United States

== Core teams ==
For each season, 15 core teams receive guaranteed berths in all events for that season's series. Fourteen of these teams qualified via their placement in the 2013–14 series. In addition to the previous season's top 14, Japan joined the core teams as they were the winners of the qualifying tournament during the 2014 Hong Kong Sevens. Spain, being the last placed core team for 2013–14, were relegated and lost their status as a core team for the 2014–15 season.

- Argentina
- Australia
- Canada
- England
- Fiji
- France
- Japan
- Kenya
- New Zealand
- Portugal
- Samoa
- Scotland
- South Africa
- United States
- Wales

== Standings ==
The final standings after completion of the nine tournaments of the series are shown in the table below.

The points awarded to teams at each tournament, as well as the overall season totals, are shown. Gold indicates the event champions. Silver indicates the event runner-ups. Bronze indicates the event third-place finishers. A dash (–) is recorded in the event column if a team did not compete at a tournament.

2014–15 World Rugby Sevens – Series XVI
Pos.	Event Team	Gold Coast	Dubai	Port Elizabeth	Wellington	Las Vegas	Hong Kong	Tokyo	Glasgow	London	Points total
1	Fiji	22	17	12	13	22	22	17	22	17	164
2	South Africa	15	22	22	17	17	17	19	13	12	154
3	New Zealand	13	15	19	22	19	19	13	19	13	152
4	England (Note: By agreement between the three unions on the island of Great Britain (England, Scotland, Wales), England, as highest finisher among those nations in the 2013–14 series, represented Great Britain in Olympic qualifying. Following England's top-four finish, the final make-up of the Great Britain team was determined by the British Olympic Association.)	17	10	10	19	12	10	22	17	15	132
5	Australia	10	19	17	12	13	13	7	10	19	120
6	United States	8	5	13	10	15	12	8	15	22	108
7	Scotland	5	12	10	15	5	8	12	12	10	89
8	Argentina	12	13	15	7	7	10	2	7	7	80
9	Canada	3	3	8	3	10	5	15	10	10	67
10	Samoa	19	8	2	2	5	15	5	3	5	64
11	France	7	7	5	8	10	7	10	5	2	61
12	Wales	10	10	5	5	2	5	5	8	5	55
13	Kenya	2	2	7	10	8	3	1	5	8	46
14	Portugal	5	5	3	5	3	1	3	2	1	28
15	Japan	1	1	1	1	1	2	10	1	3	21
16	Brazil	–	1	–	–	1	–	–	–	1	3
17	Russia	–	–	–	–	–	–	–	1	–	1
18	Hong Kong	–	–	–	–	–	–	1	–	–	1
19	Zimbabwe	–	–	1	–	–	–	–	–	–	1
20	Belgium	–	–	–	–	–	1	–	–	–	1
21	Papua New Guinea	–	–	–	1	–	–	–	–	–	1
22	American Samoa	1	–	–	–	–	–	–	–	–	1

Source: World Rugby

Legend
Event Medalists
Gold	Event Champions
Silver	Event Runner-ups
Bronze	Event Third place finishers
Qualification for the 2015–16 World Sevens Series
No colour	Core team in 2014–15 and re-qualified as a core team for the 2015–16 World Rugby Sevens Series
Pink	Relegated as the lowest placed core team at the end of the 2014–15 season
Yellow	Not a core team
Qualification for the 2016 Olympic Sevens
Qualified as one of the four highest placed eligible teams from the 2014–15 World Rugby Sevens Series not already qualified.
Already confirmed for 2016 (host country Brazil)

== Tournaments ==
=== Gold Coast ===
Event	Winners	Score	Finalists	Semifinalists
Cup	Fiji	31–24	Samoa	England (Third); South Africa
Plate	New Zealand	36–21	Argentina	Australia; Wales
Bowl	United States	31–15	France	Portugal; Scotland
Shield	Canada	40–7	Kenya	American Samoa; Japan

=== Dubai ===
Event	Winners	Score	Finalists	Semifinalists
Cup	South Africa	33–7	Australia	Fiji (Third); New Zealand
Plate	Argentina	26–12	Scotland	England; Wales
Bowl	Samoa	31–21	France	Portugal; United States
Shield	Canada	19–12	Kenya	Brazil; Japan

=== Port Elizabeth ===
Event	Winners	Score	Finalists	Semifinalists
Cup	South Africa	26–17	New Zealand	Australia (Third); Argentina
Plate	United States	21–14	Fiji	England; Scotland
Bowl	Canada	24–5	Kenya	France; Wales
Shield	Portugal	19–14	Samoa	Japan; Zimbabwe

=== Wellington ===
Event	Winners	Score	Finalists	Semifinalists
Cup	New Zealand	27–21	England	South Africa (Third); Scotland
Plate	Fiji	24–0	Australia	Kenya; United States
Bowl	France	29–5	Argentina	Portugal; Wales
Shield	Canada	26–10	Samoa	Japan; Papua New Guinea

=== Las Vegas ===
Event	Winners	Score	Finalists	Semifinalists
Cup	Fiji	35–19	New Zealand	South Africa (Third); United States
Plate	Australia	21–14	England	Canada; France
Bowl	Kenya	24–21	Argentina	Samoa; Scotland
Shield	Portugal	19–12	Wales	Brazil; Japan

=== Hong Kong ===
Event	Winners	Score	Finalists	Semifinalists
Cup	Fiji	33–19	New Zealand	South Africa (Third); Samoa
Plate	Australia	21–17	United States	Argentina; England
Bowl	Scotland	26–5	France	Wales; Canada
Shield	Kenya	26–7	Japan	Belgium; Portugal

=== Tokyo ===
Event	Winners	Score	Finalists	Semifinalists
Cup	England	21–14	South Africa	Fiji (Third); Canada
Plate	New Zealand	21–14	Scotland	France; Japan
Bowl	United States	17–12	Australia	Samoa; Wales
Shield	Portugal	12–7	Argentina	Hong Kong; Kenya

=== Glasgow ===
Event	Winners	Score	Finalists	Semifinalists
Cup	Fiji	24–17	New Zealand	England (Third); United States
Plate	South Africa	12–10	Scotland	Australia; Canada
Bowl	Wales	12–7	Argentina	France; Kenya
Shield	Samoa	22–12	Portugal	Japan; Russia

=== London ===
Event	Winners	Score	Finalists	Semifinalists
Cup	United States	45–22	Australia	Fiji (Third); England
Plate	New Zealand	26–14	South Africa	Canada; Scotland
Bowl	Kenya	26–12	Argentina	Samoa; Wales
Shield	Japan	21–19	France	Brazil; Portugal

== Player scoring ==
Leading Try Scorers (2014–15)
Rank	Player	Tries
1	(South Africa) Seabelo Senatla	47
2	(Fiji) Savenaca Rawaca	42
3	(Fiji) Semi Kunatani	40
4	(United States) Carlin Isles	32
4	(Australia) Cameron Clark	32
6	(Australia) Pama Fou	31
7	(New Zealand) Joe Webber	30
7	Samoa Toloa	30
9	(New Zealand) Sherwin Stowers	29
10	(United States) Perry Baker	28

Updated: 5 June 2015

Leading Point Scorers (2014–15)
Rank	Player	Points
1	(Fiji) Osea Kolinisau	312
2	(United States) Madison Hughes	296
3	(South Africa) Seabelo Senatla	235
4	(France) Terry Bouhraoua	229
5	(Australia) Cameron Clark	218
6	(England) Tom Mitchell	216
7	(Fiji) Savenaca Rawaca	210
8	(Scotland) Colin Gregor	207
9	(South Africa) Branco du Preez	201
10	(Fiji) Semi Kunatani	200

Updated: 5 June 2015
