= 2015 USA Sevens =

- Sevens World Series XVI
- Host nation: United States
- Date: February 13–15, 2015

Cup
- Champion: Fiji
- Runner-up: New Zealand
- Third: South Africa

Plate
- Winner: Australia
- Runner-up: England

Bowl
- Winner: Kenya
- Runner-up: Argentina

Shield
- Winner: Portugal
- Runner-up: Wales

Tournament details
- Matches played: 45
- Tries scored: 272 (average 6.04 per match)

The 2015 USA Sevens (also sometimes referred to as the 2015 Las Vegas Sevens) is the twelfth edition of the USA Sevens tournament, and the fifth tournament of the 2014–15 Sevens World Series. The tournament is scheduled for February 13–15, 2015 at Sam Boyd Stadium in Las Vegas, Nevada.

== Format ==
The teams were drawn into four pools of four teams each. Each team played everyone in their pool one time. The top two teams from each pool advanced to the Cup/Plate brackets. The bottom two teams from each group went to the Bowl/Shield brackets.

== Teams ==
The following teams will participate in the tournament.

- Argentina
- Australia
- Brazil
- Canada
- England
- Fiji
- France
- Japan
- Kenya
- New Zealand
- Portugal
- Samoa
- Scotland
- South Africa
- United States
- Wales

== Match officials ==
The match officials for the 2015 Wellington Sevens are as follows:

- Mike Adamson (Scotland)
- Federico Anselmi (Argentina)
- Nick Briant (New Zealand)
- Ben Crouse (South Africa)
- Richard Kelly (New Zealand)
- Anthony Moyes (Australia)
- Matt O'Brien (Australia)
- Rasta Rasivhenge (World Rugby)
- Marius van der Westhuizen (South Africa)

== Pool stage ==
Key to colours in group tables
Teams that advanced to the Cup/Plate Quarterfinal

=== Pool A ===
Teams	Pld	W	D	L	PF	PA	+/−	Pts
Fiji	3	3	0	0	78	36	+42	9
New Zealand	3	2	0	1	67	26	+41	7
Samoa	3	1	0	2	31	70	–39	5
Wales	3	0	0	3	50	94	–44	3

13 February 2015
16:44

New Zealand	40–7	Wales
	Report

Sam Boyd Stadium

13 February 2015
17:06

Fiji	36–0	Samoa
	Report

Sam Boyd Stadium

13 February 2015
19:40

New Zealand	15–5	Samoa
	Report

Sam Boyd Stadium

13 February 2015
20:02

Fiji	28–24	Wales
	Report

Sam Boyd Stadium

14 February 2015
11:30

Wales	19–26	Samoa
	Report

Sam Boyd Stadium

14 February 2015
13:05

New Zealand	12–14	Fiji
	Report

Sam Boyd Stadium

=== Pool B ===
Teams	Pld	W	D	L	PF	PA	+/−	Pts
Canada	3	2	0	1	60	41	+19	7
England	3	2	0	1	52	46	+6	7
Argentina	3	1	0	2	43	57	–14	5
Kenya	3	1	0	2	50	61	–11	5

13 February 2015
17:28

England	19–17	Argentina
	Report

Sam Boyd Stadium

13 February 2015
17:50

Kenya	22–21	Canada
	Report

Sam Boyd Stadium

13 February 2015
20:24

England	12–15	Canada
	Report

Sam Boyd Stadium

13 February 2015
20:46

Kenya	14–19	Argentina
	Report

Sam Boyd Stadium

14 February 2015
11:52

Argentina	7–24	Canada
	Report

Sam Boyd Stadium

14 February 2015
13:30

England	21–14	Kenya
	Report

Sam Boyd Stadium

=== Pool C ===
Teams	Pld	W	D	L	PF	PA	+/−	Pts
South Africa	3	2	1	0	80	24	+56	8
United States	3	2	1	0	90	38	+52	8
Portugal	3	1	0	2	28	57	–29	5
Japan	3	0	0	3	36	115	–79	3

13 February 2015
16:00

South Africa	19–0	Portugal
	Report

Sam Boyd Stadium

13 February 2015
16:22

United States	52–12	Japan
	Report

Sam Boyd Stadium

13 February 2015
18:56

South Africa	42–5	Japan
	Report

Sam Boyd Stadium

13 February 2015
19:18

United States	19–7	Portugal
	Report

Sam Boyd Stadium

14 February 2015
11:08

Portugal	21–19	Japan
	Report

Sam Boyd Stadium

14 February 2015
12:40

South Africa	19–19	United States
	Report

Sam Boyd Stadium

=== Pool D ===
Teams	Pld	W	D	L	PF	PA	+/−	Pts
Australia	3	3	0	0	121	28	+93	9
France	3	2	0	1	59	45	+14	7
Scotland	3	1	0	2	59	78	–19	5
Brazil	3	0	0	3	21	109	–88	3

13 February 2015
18:12

Scotland	7–19	France
	Report

Sam Boyd Stadium

13 February 2015
18:34

Australia	45–0	Brazil
	Report

Sam Boyd Stadium

13 February 2015
21:08

Scotland	38–14	Brazil
	Report

Sam Boyd Stadium

13 February 2015
21:30

Australia	31–14	France
	Report

Sam Boyd Stadium

14 February 2015
12:14

France	26–7	Brazil
	Report

Sam Boyd Stadium

14 February 2015
13:52

Scotland	14–45	Australia
	Report

Sam Boyd Stadium

== Knockout stage ==
=== Shield ===
Quarter-finals
14 February 2015 – 15:46 – Sam Boyd Stadium, Whitney, Nevada
Samoa	26
Brazil	7
14 February 2015 – 16:08 – Sam Boyd Stadium, Whitney, Nevada
Portugal	7
Kenya	17
14 February 2015 – 16:30 – Sam Boyd Stadium, Whitney, Nevada
Scotland	19
Wales	14
14 February 2015 – 16:52 – Sam Boyd Stadium, Whitney, Nevada
Argentina	15
Japan	12

Semi-finals
15 February 2015 – 10:20 – Sam Boyd Stadium, Whitney, Nevada
Brazil	19
Portugal	26
15 February 2015 – 10:42 – Sam Boyd Stadium, Whitney, Nevada
Wales	47
Japan	33

Final
15 February 2015 – 13:45 – Sam Boyd Stadium, Whitney, Nevada
Portugal	19
Wales	12

=== Bowl ===
Quarter-finals
14 February 2015 – 15:46 – Sam Boyd Stadium, Whitney, Nevada
Samoa	26
Brazil	7
14 February 2015 – 16:08 – Sam Boyd Stadium, Whitney, Nevada
Portugal	7
Kenya	17
14 February 2015 – 16:30 – Sam Boyd Stadium, Whitney, Nevada
Scotland	19
Wales	14
14 February 2015 – 16:52 – Sam Boyd Stadium, Whitney, Nevada
Argentina	15
Japan	12

Semi-finals
15 February 2015 – 11:04 – Sam Boyd Stadium, Whitney, Nevada
Samoa	5
Kenya	19
15 February 2015 – 11:26 – Sam Boyd Stadium, Whitney, Nevada
Scotland	19
Argentina	21

Final
15 February 2015 – 14:10 – Sam Boyd Stadium, Whitney, Nevada
Kenya	24
Argentina	21

=== Plate ===
Quarter-finals
14 February 2015 – 17:14 – Sam Boyd Stadium, Whitney, Nevada
Fiji	31
France	12
14 February 2015 – 17:36 – Sam Boyd Stadium, Whitney, Nevada
South Africa	21
England	14
14 February 2015 – 17:58 – Sam Boyd Stadium, Whitney, Nevada
Australia	7
New Zealand	28
14 February 2015 – 18:20 – Sam Boyd Stadium, Whitney, Nevada
Canada	0
United States	20

Semi-finals
15 February 2015 – 11:48 – Sam Boyd Stadium, Whitney, Nevada
France	5
England	26
15 February 2015 – 12:10 – Sam Boyd Stadium, Whitney, Nevada
Australia	17
Canada	0

Final
15 February 2015 – 14:35 – Sam Boyd Stadium, Whitney, Nevada
England	14
Australia	21

=== Cup ===
Quarter-finals
14 February 2015 – 17:14 – Sam Boyd Stadium, Whitney, Nevada
Fiji	31
France	12
14 February 2015 – 17:36 – Sam Boyd Stadium, Whitney, Nevada
South Africa	21
England	14
14 February 2015 – 17:58 – Sam Boyd Stadium, Whitney, Nevada
Australia	7
New Zealand	28
14 February 2015 – 18:20 – Sam Boyd Stadium, Whitney, Nevada
Canada	0
United States	20

Semi-finals
15 February 2015 – 12:32 – Sam Boyd Stadium, Whitney, Nevada
Fiji	24
South Africa	19
15 February 2015 – 12:54 – Sam Boyd Stadium, Whitney, Nevada
New Zealand	26
United States	12

Final
15 February 2015 – 15:25 – Sam Boyd Stadium, Whitney, Nevada
Fiji	35
New Zealand	19
Third place
15 February 2015 – 15:00 – Sam Boyd Stadium, Whitney, Nevada
South Africa	31
United States	0
