= 2015 Hong Kong Sevens =

Rugby union sevens tournament

- Sevens World Series XVI
- Host nation: Hong Kong
- Date: 27–29 March 2015

Cup
- Champion: Fiji
- Runner-up: New Zealand
- Third: South Africa

Plate
- Winner: Australia
- Runner-up: United States

Bowl
- Winner: Scotland
- Runner-up: France

Shield
- Winner: Kenya
- Runner-up: Japan

The 2015 Hong Kong Sevens was the 40th edition of the Hong Kong Sevens and the sixth tournament of the 2014–15 Sevens World Series.

== Format ==
As in the last tournament, there will be a main draw with the fifteen World Series core teams and one invited team, and a qualifying tournament featuring twelve teams, the winner of which will be given core status in the next series.

== Teams ==
The teams confirmed for both the World Series and World Series Qualifier events at the 2015 Hong Kong Sevens are listed below:

=== Main draw ===
- Argentina
- Australia
- Belgium
- Canada
- England
- Fiji
- France
- Japan
- Kenya
- New Zealand
- Portugal
- Western Samoa
- Scotland
- South Africa
- United States
- Wales

=== World Series Qualifier ===
- Brazil
- Guyana
- Hong Kong
- Mexico
- Papua New Guinea
- Russia
- South Korea
- Spain
- Tonga
- Tunisia
- Uruguay
- Zimbabwe

== Match officials ==
The match officials for the 2015 Wellington Sevens are as follows:

- Mike Adamson (Scotland)
- Federico Anselmi (Argentina)
- Ben Crouse (South Africa)
- Richard Kelly (New Zealand)
- James McPhail (Netherlands)
- Taku Otsuki (Japan)
- Rasta Rasivhenge (World Rugby)
- Alex Ruiz (France)

== Main draw ==
The draw was announced on 16 February. All times UTC +08:00.

Key to colours in group tables
Teams that advanced to the Cup quarterfinal

=== Pool stage ===
==== Pool A ====
Pos	Team	Pld	W	D	L	PF	PA	PD	Pts
1	Fiji	3	3	0	0	121	19	+102	9
2	Samoa	3	2	0	1	65	62	+3	7
3	Canada	3	1	0	2	47	81	−34	5
4	Belgium	3	0	0	3	24	95	−71	3

27 March 2015
19:16

Canada	28–12	Belgium
	Report

Hong Kong Stadium, Hong Kong

27 March 2015
20:44

Fiji	38–12	Samoa
	Report

Hong Kong Stadium, Hong Kong

28 March 2015
13:24

Canada	19–24	Samoa
	Report

Hong Kong Stadium, Hong Kong

28 March 2015
13:46

Fiji	38–7	Belgium
	Report

Hong Kong Stadium, Hong Kong

28 March 2015
16:20

Samoa	29–5	Belgium
	Report

Hong Kong Stadium, Hong Kong

28 March 2015
17:48

Fiji	45–0	Canada
	Report

Hong Kong Stadium, Hong Kong

==== Pool B ====
Pos	Team	Pld	W	D	L	PF	PA	PD	Pts
1	New Zealand	3	2	1	0	64	36	+28	8
2	Australia	3	2	0	1	59	24	+35	7
3	Scotland	3	1	0	2	26	59	−33	5
4	Portugal	3	0	1	2	41	71	−30	4

27 March 2015
18:54

Australia	33–5	Portugal
	Report

Hong Kong Stadium, Hong Kong

27 March 2015
20:22

New Zealand	26–7	Scotland
	Report

Hong Kong Stadium, Hong Kong

28 March 2015
12:40

Australia	21–5	Scotland
	Report

Hong Kong Stadium, Hong Kong

28 March 2015
13:02

New Zealand	24–24	Portugal
	Report

Hong Kong Stadium, Hong Kong

28 March 2015
15:58

Scotland	14–12	Portugal
	Report

Hong Kong Stadium, Hong Kong

28 March 2015
17:26

New Zealand	14–5	Australia
	Report

Hong Kong Stadium, Hong Kong

==== Pool C ====
Pos	Team	Pld	W	D	L	PF	PA	PD	Pts
1	South Africa	3	3	0	0	80	7	+73	9
2	Argentina	3	2	0	1	45	43	+2	7
3	France	3	1	0	2	36	62	−26	5
4	Japan	3	0	0	3	21	70	−49	3

27 March 2015
18:32

France	24–7	Japan
	Report

Hong Kong Stadium, Hong Kong

27 March 2015
20:00

South Africa	24–0	Argentina
	Report

Hong Kong Stadium, Hong Kong

28 March 2015
11:56

France	5–26	Argentina
	Report

Hong Kong Stadium, Hong Kong

28 March 2015
12:18

South Africa	27–0	Japan
	Report

Hong Kong Stadium, Hong Kong

28 March 2015
15:36

Argentina	19–14	Japan
	Report

Hong Kong Stadium, Hong Kong

28 March 2015
17:04

South Africa	29-7	France
	Report

Hong Kong Stadium, Hong Kong

==== Pool D ====
Pos	Team	Pld	W	D	L	PF	PA	PD	Pts
1	United States	3	2	1	0	82	47	+35	8
2	England	3	2	1	0	64	47	+17	8
3	Wales	3	1	0	2	50	78	−28	5
4	Kenya	3	0	0	3	33	57	−24	3

27 March 2015
18:10

England	26–19	Wales
	Report

Hong Kong Stadium, Hong Kong

27 March 2015
19:38

United States	21–14	Kenya
	Report

Hong Kong Stadium, Hong Kong

28 March 2015
11:12

England	17–7	Kenya
	Report

Hong Kong Stadium, Hong Kong

28 March 2015
11:34

United States	40–12	Wales
	Report

Hong Kong Stadium, Hong Kong

28 March 2015
15:14

Kenya	12–19	Wales
	Report

Hong Kong Stadium, Hong Kong

28 March 2015
16:42

United States	21–21	England
	Report

Hong Kong Stadium, Hong Kong

=== Knockout stage ===
==== Shield ====
Quarter-finals
29 March 2015 – 09:30 – Hong Kong Stadium
Canada	21
Kenya	10
29 March 2015 – 09:52 – Hong Kong Stadium
France	26
Portugal	14
29 March 2015 – 10:14 – Hong Kong Stadium
Wales	38
Belgium	7
29 March 2015 – 10:36 – Hong Kong Stadium
Scotland	28
Japan	7

Semi-finals
29 March 2015 – 13:34 – Hong Kong Stadium
Kenya	21
Portugal	0
29 March 2015 – 13:56 – Hong Kong Stadium
Belgium	7
Japan	42

Final
29 March 2015 – 17:00 – Hong Kong Stadium
Kenya	26
Japan	7

==== Bowl ====
Quarter-finals
29 March 2015 – 09:30 – Hong Kong Stadium
Canada	21
Kenya	10
29 March 2015 – 09:52 – Hong Kong Stadium
France	26
Portugal	14
29 March 2015 – 10:14 – Hong Kong Stadium
Wales	38
Belgium	7
29 March 2015 – 10:36 – Hong Kong Stadium
Scotland	28
Japan	7

Semi-finals
29 March 2015 – 14:18 – Hong Kong Stadium
Canada	19
France	38
29 March 2015 – 14:40 – Hong Kong Stadium
Wales	0
Scotland	34

Final
29 March 2015 – 17:30 – Hong Kong Stadium
France	5
Scotland	26

==== Plate ====
Quarter-finals
29 March 2015 – 10:58 – Hong Kong Stadium
Fiji	14
England	12
29 March 2015 – 11:20 – Hong Kong Stadium
South Africa	7
Australia	5
29 March 2015 – 11:42 – Hong Kong Stadium
United States	15
Samoa	26
29 March 2015 – 11:42 – Hong Kong Stadium
New Zealand	31
Argentina	21

Semi-finals
29 March 2015 – 15:02 – Hong Kong Stadium
England	7
Australia	12
29 March 2015 – 15:24 – Hong Kong Stadium
United States	28
Argentina	7

Final
29 March 2015 – 18:00 – Hong Kong Stadium
Australia	21
United States	17

==== Cup ====
Quarter-finals
29 March 2015 – 10:58 – Hong Kong Stadium
Fiji	14
England	12
29 March 2015 – 11:20 – Hong Kong Stadium
South Africa	7
Australia	5
29 March 2015 – 11:42 – Hong Kong Stadium
United States	15
Samoa	26
29 March 2015 – 11:42 – Hong Kong Stadium
New Zealand	31
Argentina	21

Semi-finals
29 March 2015 – 15:46 – Hong Kong Stadium
Fiji	21
South Africa	15
29 March 2015 – 16:08 – Hong Kong Stadium
Samoa	14
New Zealand	15

Final
29 March 2015 – 19:00 – Hong Kong Stadium
Fiji	33
New Zealand	19
Third place
29 March 2015 – 18:30 – Hong Kong Stadium
South Africa	26
Samoa	5

== World Series Qualifier ==
The draw was announced on 16 February.

Key to colours in group tables
Teams that advance to the Qualifier quarterfinal

=== Pool stage ===
==== Pool E ====
Pos	Team	Pld	W	D	L	PF	PA	PD	Pts
1	Hong Kong	3	2	0	1	69	29	+40	7
2	Brazil	3	2	0	1	57	36	+21	7
3	Uruguay	3	2	0	1	42	26	+16	7
4	Mexico	3	0	0	3	15	92	−77	3

27 March 2015
14:28

Uruguay	21–0	Mexico

Hong Kong Stadium, Hong Kong

27 March 2015
14:50

Hong Kong	12–17	Brazil

Hong Kong Stadium, Hong Kong

27 March 2015
16:40

Uruguay	14–7	Brazil

Hong Kong Stadium, Hong Kong

27 March 2015
17:02

Hong Kong	38–5	Mexico

Hong Kong Stadium, Hong Kong

28 March 2015
09:44

Brazil	33–10	Mexico

Hong Kong Stadium, Hong Kong

28 March 2015
10:50

Hong Kong	19–7	Uruguay

Hong Kong Stadium, Hong Kong

==== Pool F ====
Pos	Team	Pld	W	D	L	PF	PA	PD	Pts
1	Papua New Guinea	3	3	0	0	66	36	+30	9
2	Russia	3	2	0	1	57	38	+19	7
3	South Korea	3	1	0	2	47	42	+5	5
4	Tunisia	3	0	0	3	12	66	−54	3

27 March 2015
13:44

Papua New Guinea	19–0	Tunisia

Hong Kong Stadium, Hong Kong

27 March 2015
14:06

Russia	14–7	South Korea

Hong Kong Stadium, Hong Kong

27 March 2015
15:56

Papua New Guinea	21–19	South Korea

Hong Kong Stadium, Hong Kong

27 March 2015
16:18

Russia	26–5	Tunisia

Hong Kong Stadium, Hong Kong

28 March 2015
09:22

South Korea	21–7	Tunisia

Hong Kong Stadium, Hong Kong

28 March 2015
10:28

Russia	17–26	Papua New Guinea

Hong Kong Stadium, Hong Kong

==== Pool G ====
Pos	Team	Pld	W	D	L	PF	PA	PD	Pts
1	Spain	3	3	0	0	87	10	+77	9
2	Zimbabwe	3	2	0	1	77	10	+67	7
3	Tonga	3	1	0	2	41	92	−51	5
4	Guyana	3	0	0	3	29	122	−93	3

27 March 2015
13:00

Zimbabwe	36–0	Guyana

Hong Kong Stadium, Hong Kong

27 March 2015
13:22

Spain	27–5	Tonga

Hong Kong Stadium, Hong Kong

27 March 2015
15:12

Zimbabwe	41–0	Tonga

Hong Kong Stadium, Hong Kong

27 March 2015
15:34

Spain	50–5	Guyana

Hong Kong Stadium, Hong Kong

28 March 2015
09:00

Tonga	36–24	Guyana

Hong Kong Stadium, Hong Kong

28 March 2015
10:06

Spain	10–0	Zimbabwe

Hong Kong Stadium, Hong Kong

=== Ranking matches ===
Qualifier Quarterfinals
28 March 2015 – 18:10 – Hong Kong Stadium
Papua New Guinea	38
Uruguay	10
28 March 2015 – 18:32 – Hong Kong Stadium
Hong Kong	0
Russia	24
28 March 2015 – 18:54 – Hong Kong Stadium
Zimbabwe	21
Brazil	14
28 March 2015 – 19:16 – Hong Kong Stadium
Spain	47
South Korea	7

Qualifier Semifinals
29 March 2015 – 12:26 – Hong Kong Stadium
Papua New Guinea	7
Russia	26
29 March 2015 – 12:48 – Hong Kong Stadium
Zimbabwe	24
Spain	14

Qualifier Final
29 March 2015 – 16:30 – Hong Kong Stadium
Russia	22
Zimbabwe	19
