= 2015 London Sevens =

- Sevens World Series XVI
- Host nation: England
- Date: 16–17 May 2015

Cup
- Champion: United States
- Runner-up: Australia
- Third: Fiji

Plate
- Winner: New Zealand
- Runner-up: South Africa

Bowl
- Winner: Kenya
- Runner-up: Argentina

Shield
- Winner: Japan
- Runner-up: France

Tournament details
- Matches played: 45

The 2015 London Sevens was the ninth and final tournament within the 2014–15 Sevens World Series. This edition of the London Sevens was held over the weekend of 16–17 May 2015 at Twickenham in London.

The most notable headline from this event was the first-ever overall tournament victory by the United States. The USA's Madison Hughes was named player of the tournament, with Hughes and Danny Barrett the two Americans selected for the tournament Dream Team.

The overall series crown was secured by Fiji when they defeated South Africa in the Cup quarter-finals.

== Format ==
The teams were drawn into four pools of four teams each. Each team plays all the others in their pool once. The top two teams from each pool advance to the Cup/Plate brackets. The bottom two teams go into the Bowl/Shield brackets.

== Teams ==
The pools and schedule were announced on 10 April 2015.

- Argentina
- Australia
- Brazil
- Canada
- England
- Fiji
- France
- Japan
- Kenya
- New Zealand
- Portugal
- South Africa
- Samoa
- Scotland
- United States
- Wales

== Pool Stage ==
Key to colours in group tables
Teams that advanced to the Cup Quarterfinal

=== Pool A ===
Teams	Pld	W	D	L	PF	PA	+/−	Pts
Fiji	3	3	0	0	81	45	+36	9
Canada	3	2	0	1	57	50	+7	7
Samoa	3	1	0	2	45	53	-8	5
Argentina	3	0	0	3	34	69	-35	3

16 May 2015
09:44

Canada	17–14	Samoa

Twickenham

16 May 2015
10:06

Fiji	24–19	Argentina

Twickenham

16 May 2015
12:50

Canada	26–5	Argentina

Twickenham

16 May 2015
13:12

Fiji	26–12	Samoa

Twickenham

16 May 2015
15:56

Argentina	10–19	Samoa

Twickenham

16 May 2015
16:18

Fiji	31–14	Canada

Twickenham

=== Pool B ===
Teams	Pld	W	D	L	PF	PA	+/−	Pts
New Zealand	3	3	0	0	88	24	+64	9
Australia	3	2	0	1	70	38	+32	7
Wales	3	1	0	2	38	78	-40	5
Japan	3	0	0	3	35	91	-56	3

16 May 2015
10:28

Australia	41–0	Japan

Twickenham

16 May 2015
10:50

New Zealand	38–0	Wales

Twickenham

16 May 2015
13:34

Australia	19–14	Wales

Twickenham

16 May 2015
13:56

New Zealand	26–14	Japan

Twickenham

16 May 2015
16:40

Wales	24–21	Japan

Twickenham

16 May 2015
17:02

New Zealand	24–10	Australia

Twickenham

=== Pool C ===
Teams	Pld	W	D	L	PF	PA	+/−	Pts
Scotland	3	3	0	0	67	45	+22	9
England	3	2	0	1	115	29	+86	7
Kenya	3	1	0	2	31	80	-49	5
Brazil	3	0	0	3	35	94	-59	3

16 May 2015
11:12

Scotland	19–14	Brazil

Twickenham

16 May 2015
11:34

England	40–0	Kenya

Twickenham

16 May 2015
14:18

Scotland	26–12	Kenya

Twickenham

16 May 2015
14:40

England	56–7	Brazil

Twickenham

16 May 2015
17:24

Kenya	19–14	Brazil

Twickenham

16 May 2015
17:46

England	19–22	Scotland

Twickenham

=== Pool D ===
Teams	Pld	W	D	L	PF	PA	+/−	Pts
United States	3	3	0	0	73	43	+30	9
South Africa	3	2	0	1	59	28	+31	7
France	3	1	0	2	52	71	-19	5
Portugal	3	0	0	3	31	73	-42	3

16 May 2015
09:00

South Africa	19–0	Portugal

Twickenham

16 May 2015
09:22

United States	24–19	France

Twickenham

16 May 2015
12:06

South Africa	28–7	France

Twickenham

16 May 2015
12:28

United States	28–12	Portugal

Twickenham

16 May 2015
15:12

France	26–19	Portugal

Twickenham

16 May 2015
15:34

United States	21–12	South Africa

Twickenham

== Knockout stage ==
=== Shield ===
Quarter-finals
17 May 2015 – 09:00 – Twickenham
Samoa	33
Portugal	14
17 May 2015 – 09:22 – Twickenham
Kenya	24
Japan	12
17 May 2015 – 09:44 – Twickenham
France	14
Argentina	17
17 May 2015 – 10:06 – Twickenham
Wales	29
Brazil	0

Semi-finals
17 May 2015 – 12:06 – Twickenham
Portugal	21
Japan	26
17 May 2015 – 12:28 – Twickenham
France	35
Brazil	12

Final
17 May 2015 – 15:22 – Twickenham
Japan	21
France	19

=== Bowl ===
Quarter-finals
17 May 2015 – 09:00 – Twickenham
Samoa	33
Portugal	14
17 May 2015 – 09:22 – Twickenham
Kenya	24
Japan	12
17 May 2015 – 09:44 – Twickenham
France	14
Argentina	17
17 May 2015 – 10:06 – Twickenham
Wales	29
Brazil	0

Semi-finals
17 May 2015 – 12:50 – Twickenham
Samoa	7
Kenya	38
17 May 2015 – 13:12 – Twickenham
Argentina	26
Wales	14

Final
17 May 2015 – 15:47 – Twickenham
Kenya	26
Argentina	12

=== Plate ===
Quarter-finals
17 May 2015 – 10:28 – Twickenham
Fiji	19
South Africa	7
17 May 2015 – 10:50 – Twickenham
Scotland	19
Australia	31
17 May 2015 – 11:12 – Twickenham
United States	29
Canada	10
17 May 2015 – 11:34 – Twickenham
New Zealand	17
England	21

Semi-finals
17 May 2015 – 13:34 – Twickenham
South Africa	31
Scotland	7
17 May 2015 – 13:56 – Twickenham
Canada	15
New Zealand	33

Final
17 May 2015 – 16:12 – Twickenham
South Africa	14
New Zealand	26

=== Cup ===
Quarter-finals
17 May 2015 – 10:28 – Twickenham
Fiji	19
South Africa	7
17 May 2015 – 10:50 – Twickenham
Scotland	19
Australia	31
17 May 2015 – 11:12 – Twickenham
United States	29
Canada	10
17 May 2015 – 11:34 – Twickenham
New Zealand	17
England	21

Semi-finals
17 May 2015 – 14:18 – Twickenham
Fiji	7
Australia	33
17 May 2015 – 14:40 – Twickenham
United States	43
England	12

Final
17 May 2015 – 17:02 – Twickenham
Australia	22
United States	45
Third place
17 May 2015 – 16:37 – Twickenham
Fiji	26
England	12

== Scoring ==
Rank	Player	Tries
1	(Kenya) Billy Odhiambo	7
1	(New Zealand) Rieko Ioane	7
1	(United States) Madison Hughes	7
4	(United States) Perry Baker	6
4	(Australia) Nicholas Malouf	6
4	(New Zealand) Sherwin Stowers	6

Source: WR website
