= Rugby sevens at the World Games =

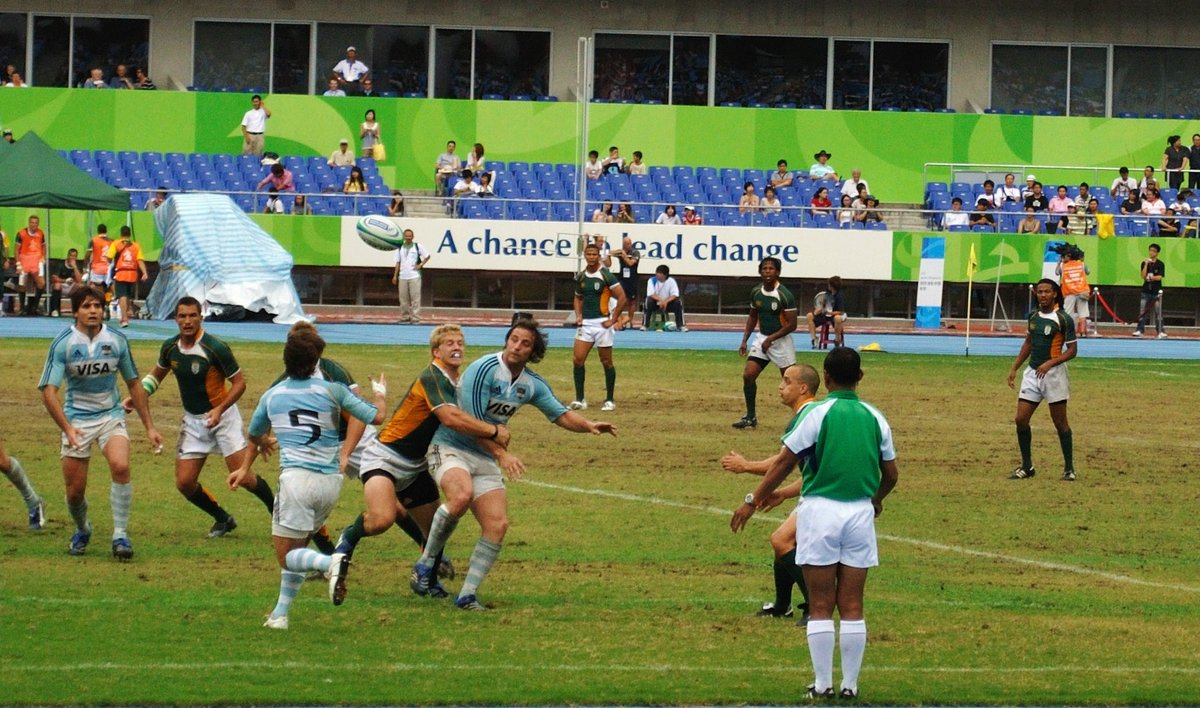
South Africa and Argentina tangle in rugby sevens at the World Games

Rugby sevens was introduced as a World Games sport for men at the 2001 World Games in Akita. No women's rugby has been played at the World Games.

The 2013 World Games was the last to feature the sport, with rugby sevens becoming a full Olympic event in 2016.

== Medalists ==
Games	Gold	Silver	Bronze
2001 Akita	Fiji (FIJ)	Australia (AUS)	New Zealand (NZL)
2005 Duisburg	Fiji (FIJ)	South Africa (RSA)	Argentina (ARG)
2009 Kaohsiung	Fiji (FIJ)	Portugal (POR)	South Africa (RSA)
2013 Cali	South Africa (RSA)	Argentina (ARG)	Canada (CAN)

== Tournament finals ==
Year	Host	Gold medal game			Bronze medal game			Refs
Year	Host	Gold medalist	Score	Silver medalist	Bronze medalist	Score	Fourth place	Refs
2001	(Japan) Akita	Fiji	35–19	Australia	New Zealand	19–10	France
2005	(Germany) Duisburg	Fiji	31–26	South Africa	Argentina	22–10	Great Britain
2009	(Chinese Taipei) Kaohsiung (Note: The Republic of China (Taiwan) is recognised as Chinese Taipei by International World Games Association and the majority of international organisations it participates in due to political considerations and Cross-Strait relations with the People's Republic of China.)	Fiji	43–10	Portugal	South Africa	17–0	Argentina
2013	(Colombia) Cali	South Africa	33–24	Argentina	Canada	33–21	France

== See also ==
- Rugby sevens at the Summer Olympics
- Rugby sevens at the Pan American Games
