= 2014 Gold Coast Sevens =

- Sevens World Series XVI
- Host nation: Australia
- Date: 11–12 October 2014

Cup
- Champion: Fiji
- Runner-up: Samoa
- Third: England

Plate
- Winner: New Zealand
- Runner-up: Argentina

Bowl
- Winner: United States
- Runner-up: France

Shield
- Winner: Canada
- Runner-up: Kenya

Tournament details
- Matches played: 45
- Tries scored: 249 (average 5.53 per match)
- Most points: (Fiji) Osea Kolinisau (55)
- Most tries: Samoa Taloa (8)

The 2014 Gold Coast Sevens was the first tournament of the 2014-15 Sevens World Series. It was held over the weekend of 11–12 October 2014 at Cbus Super Stadium in Queensland, Australia, and was the twelfth completed edition of the Australian Sevens tournament.

== Format ==
The teams were drawn into four pools of four teams each. Each team played everyone in their pool one time. The top two teams from each pool advanced to the Cup/Plate brackets. The bottom two teams from each group went to the Bowl/Shield brackets.

== Teams ==
Participating teams and schedule were announced on 16 September 2014.

- American Samoa
- Argentina
- Australia
- Canada
- England
- Fiji
- France
- Japan
- Kenya
- New Zealand
- Portugal
- Samoa
- Scotland
- South Africa
- United States
- Wales

== Match officials ==
The match officials for the 2014 Gold Coast Sevens are as follows:

- Mike Adamson (Scotland)
- Federico Anselmi (Argentina)
- Nick Briant (New Zealand)
- Richard Kelly (New Zealand)
- Anthony Moyes (Australia)
- Matt O'Brien (Australia)
- Rasta Rasivhenge (South Africa)
- Marius van der Westhuizen (South Africa)

== Pool Stage ==
Key to colours in group tables
Teams that advanced to the Cup Quarterfinal

=== Pool A ===
Team	Pld	W	D	L	PF	PA	PD	Pts
New Zealand	3	3	0	0	123	24	99	9
Samoa	3	2	0	1	76	54	22	7
France	3	1	0	2	52	69	–17	5
Japan	3	0	0	3	28	132	–104	3

11 October 2014
10:34

New Zealand	36–7	France
	Report

Cbus Super Stadium, Gold Coast

11 October 2014
10:56

Samoa	40–14	Japan
	Report

Cbus Super Stadium, Gold Coast

11 October 2014
13:35

New Zealand	59–0	Japan
	Report

Cbus Super Stadium, Gold Coast

11 October 2014
13:57

Samoa	19–12	France
	Report

Cbus Super Stadium, Gold Coast

11 October 2014
17:11

France	33–14	Japan
	Report

Cbus Super Stadium, Gold Coast

11 October 2014
17:33

New Zealand	28–17	Samoa
	Report

Cbus Super Stadium, Gold Coast

=== Pool B ===
Team	Pld	W	D	L	PF	PA	PD	Pts
South Africa	3	3	0	0	112	12	100	9
Wales	3	2	0	1	72	38	34	7
Kenya	3	1	0	2	61	69	–8	5
American Samoa	3	0	0	3	0	126	–126	3

11 October 2014
11:18

South Africa	19–12	Wales
	Report

Cbus Super Stadium, Gold Coast

11 October 2014
11:40

Kenya	42–0	American Samoa
	Report

Cbus Super Stadium, Gold Coast

11 October 2014
14:39

South Africa	48–0	American Samoa
	Report

Cbus Super Stadium, Gold Coast

11 October 2014
15:01

Kenya	19–24	Wales
	Report

Cbus Super Stadium, Gold Coast

11 October 2014
17:55

Wales	36–0	American Samoa
	Report

Cbus Super Stadium, Gold Coast

11 October 2014
18:17

South Africa	45–0	Kenya
	Report

Cbus Super Stadium, Gold Coast

=== Pool C ===
Team	Pld	W	D	L	PF	PA	PD	Pts
Fiji	3	3	0	0	113	19	94	9
Australia	3	2	0	1	65	49	16	7
Scotland	3	0	1	2	42	85	–43	4
Portugal	3	0	1	2	21	88	–67	4

11 October 2014
12:02

Fiji	40–7	Scotland
	Report

Cbus Super Stadium, Gold Coast

11 October 2014
12:24

Australia	29–0	Portugal
	Report

Cbus Super Stadium, Gold Coast

11 October 2014
15:23

Fiji	38–0	Portugal
	Report

Cbus Super Stadium, Gold Coast

11 October 2014
15:45

Australia	24–14	Scotland
	Report

Cbus Super Stadium, Gold Coast

11 October 2014
18:39

Scotland	21–21	Portugal
	Report

Cbus Super Stadium, Gold Coast

11 October 2014
19:01

Fiji	35–12	Australia
	Report

Cbus Super Stadium, Gold Coast

=== Pool D ===
Team	Pld	W	D	L	PF	PA	PD	Pts
Argentina	3	3	0	0	61	43	18	9
England	3	2	0	1	52	40	12	7
United States	3	1	0	2	36	55	–19	5
Canada	3	0	0	3	39	50	–11	3

11 October 2014
09:50

England	19–21	Argentina
	Report

Cbus Super Stadium, Gold Coast

11 October 2014
10:12

Canada	15–17	United States
	Report

Cbus Super Stadium, Gold Coast

11 October 2014
12:51

England	14–7	United States
	Report

Cbus Super Stadium, Gold Coast

11 October 2014
13:13

Canada	12–14	Argentina
	Report

Cbus Super Stadium, Gold Coast

11 October 2014
16:07

Argentina	26–12	United States
	Report

Cbus Super Stadium, Gold Coast

11 October 2014
16:29

England	19–12	Canada
	Report

Cbus Super Stadium, Gold Coast

== Knockout stage ==
=== Shield ===
Bowl/Shield quarter-finals
12 October 2014 – 09:20 – Cbus Super Stadium
France	21
Canada	19
12 October 2014 – 09:42 – Cbus Super Stadium
Scotland	24
American Samoa	12
12 October 2014 – 10:04 – Cbus Super Stadium
United States	26
Japan	5
12 October 2014 – 10:26 – Cbus Super Stadium
Kenya	17
Portugal	19

Shield semi-finals
12 October 2014 – 12:21 – Cbus Super Stadium
Canada	50
American Samoa	0
12 October 2014 – 12:43 – Cbus Super Stadium
Japan	15
Kenya	17

Shield final
12 October 2014 – 15:47 – Cbus Super Stadium
Canada	40
Kenya	7

=== Bowl ===
Bowl/Shield quarter-finals
12 October 2014 – 09:20 – Cbus Super Stadium
France	21
Canada	19
12 October 2014 – 09:42 – Cbus Super Stadium
Scotland	24
American Samoa	12
12 October 2014 – 10:04 – Cbus Super Stadium
United States	26
Japan	5
12 October 2014 – 10:26 – Cbus Super Stadium
Kenya	17
Portugal	19

Bowl semi-finals
12 October 2014 – 13:05 – Cbus Super Stadium
France	26
Scotland	0
12 October 2014 – 13:27 – Cbus Super Stadium
United States	33
Portugal	0

Bowl final
12 October 2014 – 16:17 – Cbus Super Stadium
France	15
United States	31

=== Plate ===
Quarter-finals
12 October 2014 – 10:48 – Cbus Super Stadium
New Zealand	7
England	31
12 October 2014 – 11:10 – Cbus Super Stadium
Fiji	31
Wales	10
12 October 2014 – 11:32 – Cbus Super Stadium
Argentina	21
Samoa	24
12 October 2014 – 11:54 – Cbus Super Stadium
South Africa	12
Australia	10

Plate semi-finals
12 October 2014 – 14:09 – Cbus Super Stadium
New Zealand	39
Wales	5
12 October 2014 – 14:31 – Cbus Super Stadium
Argentina	21
Australia	17

Plate final
12 October 2014 – 16:47 – Cbus Super Stadium
New Zealand	36
Argentina	21

=== Cup ===
Quarter-finals
12 October 2014 – 10:48 – Cbus Super Stadium
New Zealand	7
England	31
12 October 2014 – 11:10 – Cbus Super Stadium
Fiji	31
Wales	10
12 October 2014 – 11:32 – Cbus Super Stadium
Argentina	21
Samoa	24
12 October 2014 – 11:54 – Cbus Super Stadium
South Africa	12
Australia	10

Semi-finals
12 October 2014 – 14:53 – Cbus Super Stadium
England	7
Fiji	48
12 October 2014 – 15:15 – Cbus Super Stadium
Samoa	28
South Africa	12

Final
12 October 2014 – 17:49 – Cbus Super Stadium
Fiji	31
Samoa	24
Third play-off
12 October 2014 – 17:17 – Cbus Super Stadium
England	19
South Africa	0

== Scoring ==
Player	Tries
Samoa Toloa	8
(United States) Zack Test	7
(Fiji) Apisalome Waqatabu	7
(United States) Perry Baker	6
(Argentina) Santiago Cordero	6
(New Zealand) Sam Dickson	6
(England) Dan Norton	6

Source: IRB website
