= Oleg Ishchenko =

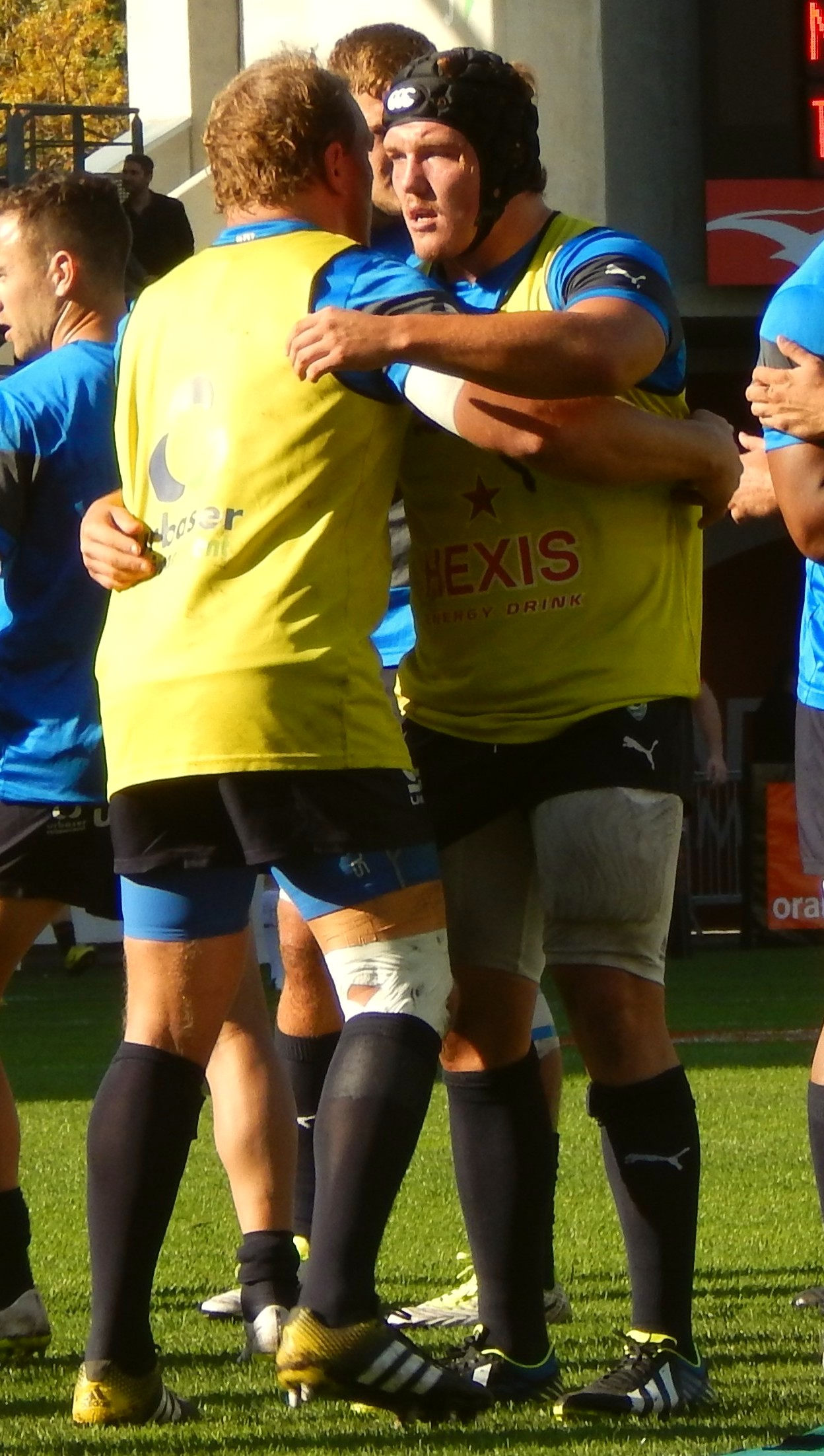
- Born: 22 January 1994 (age 32)
- Height: 1.85 m (6 ft 1 in)
- Weight: 110 kg (17 st 5 lb)

Rugby union career
- Position: Prop
Senior career
| Years | Team | Apps | (Points) |
| 2015–16 | Montpellier HR | 4 | (0) |
| 2016-17 | US Colomiers | 4 | (5) |
| 2017-18 | RC Vannes | 17 | (0) |
| 2018- | Provence Rugby | 26 | (0) |
- Correct as of 15 December 2019

Oleg Ishchenko (born January 22, 1994) is a French rugby union footballer, who currently plays for Provence Rugby in the Rugby Pro D2. His usual position is at prop.

== Biography ==
Oleg Ishchenko begins the rugby on the 2nd year of the middle school, in UNSS to the middle school of Ottmarsheim, then integrates the school of rugby of the club of l'AS Chalampé.

In 2010, during the tournament of Toulon of January, he is classified in the national top 100. A few days later, he carries the jersey of the French team in junior category, on occasion of the tournament interpoles of Toulouse.

In September, 2012, it is called to enter the division of France. He plays then under the shirt of the France national under-20 rugby union team, in this way competing for the World Rugby Under 20 Championship which he finishes in the 5th place.

== Personal life ==
Ishchenko is of Belarusian descent.
