= Matt O'Brien =

Australian rugby union referee

- Born: 22 July 1981 (age 45) Southland, New Zealand

Rugby union career
Refereeing career
Years	Competition	Apps
2011–2014	IRB Sevens World Series	
2014	IRB Junior World Cup	
2014–2015	Super Rugby	2
- Correct as of 1 February 2015

Matt O'Brien (born 22 July 1981) is a New Zealand-born Australian professional rugby union referee. He has officiated on the IRB Sevens World Series circuit since 2011 and was appointed to the Super Rugby referees panel for 2014 and 2015.

== Family and early life ==
O'Brien was born in Southland, New Zealand and is the son of former international rugby referee Paddy O'Brien. He studied pharmacy at the University of Otago where he played as a winger on the University's rugby team in the early 2000s, before he moved to the Gold Coast in Australia and established a pharmacy business.

== Refereeing ==
After retiring from playing in the Queensland Premier Rugby competition for the Gold Coast Breakers, O'Brien took up rugby refereeing in 2008. He was appointed to the IRB Sevens World Series in 2011, and was the referee in three finals matches. He was named as one of 16 referees on the SANZAR referee panel for the 2014 season, and refereed his first match in Super Rugby between the Chiefs and Rebels in April that year. He also refereed at the IRB Junior World Championship in 2014.

O'Brien refereed the 2016 Wellington Sevens Cup final between New Zealand and South Africa that was won by New Zealand.
