= 2024 Oceania Sevens Championship =

Men's rugby sevens tournament in Solomon Islands

- Host nation: Solomon Islands
- Date: 7–8 December 2024

Cup
- Champion: Samoa
- Runner-up: Fiji
- Third: Tonga

Tournament details
- Matches played: 38

The 2024 Oceania Sevens Championship was the sixteenth Oceania Sevens tournament in men's rugby sevens. It will offers two teams the chance to compete on the global stage, competing for qualification to the World Rugby Sevens Challenger Series, and it was held at National Stadium in Honiara, Solomon Islands from 7 to 8 December.

== Teams ==
Fourteen national teams were scheduled to compete at the 2024 tournament, plus an Oceania invitational team:

- American Samoa
- Australia
- Cook Islands
- Fiji
- Japan
- Kiribati
- Nauru
- New Caledonia
- Niue
- Samoa
- Solomon Islands
- Tahiti
- Tonga
- Tuvalu
- Vanuatu

== Format ==
Teams were seeded into four pools of four teams, except one group. The top two teams from each group advanced to the quarter-finals, while the remaining teams will battle it out in parallel to determine their final ranking.

The stakes are high for teams competing in this year's tournament. The two highest-ranked non-2024–25 SVNS will secure spots in the World Rugby Challenger Series. Teams already qualified for the HSBC Sevens World Series (Fiji and Australia) are not eligible for Challenger Series qualification, leaving the race wide open for other teams to rise to the occasion.

== Pool stage ==
=== Pool A ===
Pos	Team	P	W	D	L	PF	PA	PD	Pts	Qualification
1	Fiji	2	2	0	0	108	7	+101	6	Advance to quarter-finals
2	Tuvalu	2	1	0	1	24	47	–23	4	Advance to quarter-finals
3	Nauru	2	0	0	2	7	85	–78	2	Placement matches

7 December

Fiji	61–7	Nauru

National Stadium, Honiara

7 December

Tuvalu	24–0	Nauru

National Stadium, Honiara

7 December

Fiji	47–0	Tuvalu

National Stadium, Honiara

=== Pool B ===
Pos	Team	P	W	D	L	PF	PA	PD	Pts	Qualification
1	Japan	3	3	0	0	99	43	+56	9	Advance to quarter-finals
2	Australia	3	2	0	1	98	29	+69	7	Advance to quarter-finals
3	Vanuatu	3	1	0	2	31	91	–60	5	Placement matches
4	American Samoa	3	0	0	3	32	97	–65	3	Placement matches

7 December

Vanuatu	17–15	American Samoa

National Stadium, Honiara

7 December

Australia	17–24	Japan

National Stadium, Honiara

7 December

Vanuatu	14–35	Japan

National Stadium, Honiara

7 December

Australia	40–5	American Samoa

National Stadium, Honiara

7 December

American Samoa	12–40	Japan

National Stadium, Honiara

7 December

Australia	41–0	Vanuatu

National Stadium, Honiara

=== Pool C ===
Pos	Team	P	W	D	L	PF	PA	PD	Pts	Qualification
1	Samoa	3	3	0	0	166	5	+161	9	Advance to quarter-finals
2	Cook Islands	3	2	0	1	63	60	+3	7	Advance to quarter-finals
3	New Caledonia	3	1	0	2	36	83	–47	5	Placement matches
4	Kiribati	3	0	0	3	12	129	–117	3	Placement matches

7 December

Cook Islands	41–5	Kiribati

National Stadium, Honiara

7 December

Samoa	59–0	New Caledonia

National Stadium, Honiara

7 December

Cook Islands	17–5	New Caledonia

National Stadium, Honiara

7 December

Samoa	57–0	Kiribati

National Stadium, Honiara

7 December

Kiribati	7–31	New Caledonia

National Stadium, Honiara

7 December

Samoa	50–5	Cook Islands

National Stadium, Honiara

=== Pool D ===
Pos	Team	P	W	D	L	PF	PA	PD	Pts	Qualification
1	Tonga	3	3	0	0	113	14	+99	9	Advance to quarter-finals
2	Niue	3	1	1	1	62	56	+6	6	Advance to quarter-finals
3	Solomon Islands	3	1	1	1	59	62	–3	6	Placement matches
4	Tahiti	3	0	0	3	5	107	–102	3	Placement matches

7 December

Solomon Islands	21–21	Niue

National Stadium, Honiara

7 December

Tonga	42–0	Tahiti

National Stadium, Honiara

7 December

Solomon Islands	31–5	Tahiti

National Stadium, Honiara

7 December

Tonga	35–7	Niue

National Stadium, Honiara

7 December

Niue	34–0	Tahiti

National Stadium, Honiara

7 December

Tonga	36–7	Solomon Islands

National Stadium, Honiara

== Knockout stage ==
=== Classification matches ===
==== Thirteenth place match ====
8 December

American Samoa	26–5	Tahiti

National Stadium, Honiara

==== 9th–12th place semi-finals ====
8 December

Nauru	0–17	Vanuatu

National Stadium, Honiara

8 December

New Caledonia	5–27	Solomon Islands

National Stadium, Honiara

==== Eleventh place match ====
8 December

Nauru	22–17	New Caledonia

National Stadium, Honiara

==== Ninth place match ====
8 December

Vanuatu	7–24	Solomon Islands

National Stadium, Honiara

=== 5th place bracket ===
==== 5th–8th semi-finals ====
8 December

Japan	12–26	Australia

National Stadium, Honiara

8 December

Cook Islands	17–12	Niue

National Stadium, Honiara

==== Seventh place match ====
8 December

Japan	31–12	Niue

National Stadium, Honiara

==== Fifth place match ====
8 December

Australia	36–0	Cook Islands

National Stadium, Honiara

=== Championship bracket ===
==== Quarter-finals ====
8 December

Japan	19–21	Tuvalu

National Stadium, Honiara

8 December

Fiji	19–10	Australia

National Stadium, Honiara

8 December

Tonga	40–12	Cook Islands

National Stadium, Honiara

8 December

Samoa	45–5	Niue

National Stadium, Honiara

==== Semi-finals ====
8 December

Tuvalu	0–38	Fiji

National Stadium, Honiara

8 December

Tonga	0–27	Samoa

National Stadium, Honiara

==== Third place match ====
8 December

Tuvalu	19–24	Tonga

National Stadium, Honiara

==== Final ====
8 December

Fiji	12–17	Samoa

National Stadium, Honiara

== Placings ==
Rank	Team
1st place, gold medalist(s)	Samoa
2nd place, silver medalist(s)	Fiji
3rd place, bronze medalist(s)	Tonga
4	Tuvalu
5	Australia
6	Cook Islands
7	Japan
8	Niue
9	Solomon Islands
10	Vanuatu
11	Nauru
12	New Caledonia
13	American Samoa
14	Tahiti
