= Rugby sevens at the 2009 Pacific Mini Games =

Men's rugby sevens at the 2009 Pacific Mini Games
- Venue: BCI Stadium
- Location: Rarotonga, Cook Islands
- Dates: 1–2 October 2009
- Teams: 10

Medalists
gold medal	Samoa
silver medal	Fiji
bronze medal	Tonga

Rugby sevens at the 2009 Pacific Mini Games was held in Rarotonga, Cook Islands, on the 1st and 2nd of October 2009.

Samoa defeated Fiji in the final to claim the gold medal, and Tonga took bronze with their win over Niue.

== Participating teams ==
Ten teams competed in the competition:

- Cook Islands (Host)
- Fiji
- New Caledonia
- Niue
- Papua New Guinea
- Samoa
- Solomon Islands
- Tahiti
- Tonga
- Wallis and Futuna

== Pool Stage ==
=== Pool A ===
Teams	Pld	W	D	L	PF	PA	+/−	Pts
Fiji	4	4	0	0	175	0	+175	12
Niue	4	3	0	1	120	38	+82	10
Cook Islands	4	2	0	2	71	72	–1	8
Tahiti	4	1	0	3	33	128	–95	6
Wallis and Futuna	4	0	0	4	0	161	–161	4

Cook Islands	40–0	Wallis and Futuna

Niue	43–0	Tahiti

Fiji	52–0	Wallis and Futuna

Niue	34–0	Cook Islands

Fiji	54–0	Tahiti

Niue	43–0	Wallis and Futuna

Cook Islands	31–7	Tahiti

Fiji	31–0	Cook Islands

Tahiti	26–0	Wallis and Futuna

Fiji	38–0	Niue

=== Pool B ===
Teams	Pld	W	D	L	PF	PA	+/−	Pts
Samoa	4	4	0	0	178	0	+178	12
Tonga	4	3	0	1	109	7	+102	10
Papua New Guinea	4	2	0	2	53	66	–13	8
Solomon Islands	4	1	0	3	40	131	–91	6
New Caledonia	4	0	0	4	12	166	–154	4

Tonga	38–0	New Caledonia

Papua New Guinea	17–12	Solomon Islands

Samoa	71–0	New Caledonia

Tonga	19–7	Papua New Guinea

Samoa	50–0	Solomon Islands

Solomon Islands	28–12	New Caledonia

Tonga	52–0	Solomon Islands

Samoa	35–0	Papua New Guinea

Papua New Guinea	29–0	New Caledonia

Samoa	22–0	Tonga

== Medals & Rankings playoffs ==
=== 9th–10th Place Playoff ===
New Caledonia	35–7	Wallis and Futuna

=== 7th–8th Place Playoff ===
Solomon Islands	26–10	Tahiti

=== 5th–6th Place Playoff ===
Cook Islands	17–12	Papua New Guinea

=== Bronze Medal ===
Tonga	38–12	Niue

=== Gold Medal Final ===
Samoa	38–12	Fiji

== Final Rankings ==
Rank	Team
1st place, gold medalist(s)	Samoa
2nd place, silver medalist(s)	Fiji
3rd place, bronze medalist(s)	Tonga
4	Niue
5	Cook Islands
6	Papua New Guinea
7	Solomon Islands
8	Tahiti
9	New Caledonia
10	Wallis and Futuna
