= Rugby sevens at the 2017 Pacific Mini Games =

Men's rugby sevens at the 2017 Pacific Mini Games
- Venue: Korman Stadium
- Location: Port Vila, Vanuatu
- Dates: 8–9 December 2017
- Teams: 10

Medalists
gold medal	Samoa
silver medal	Fiji
bronze medal	Tonga

Rugby sevens at the 2017 Pacific Mini Games was held in Port Vila, Vanuatu at the Korman Stadium, from 8 to 9 December 2017. There was no women's tournament for this sport at these games. The competition also doubled as the final Oceania qualifying spot to the 2018 Rugby World Cup Sevens in San Francisco.

Samoa edged Fiji to win the gold medal. Tonga beat the Solomon Islands for the bronze medal. Since Fiji and Samoa had already qualified for the 2018 Rugby World Cup Sevens, the final World Cup spot went to Tonga.

== Participating teams ==
Twelve teams were initially expected to compete in the competition. Tahiti withdrew at the last minute due to the French Polynesian government's decision to boycott the games.

- Fiji
- Nauru
- New Caledonia
- Niue
- Samoa
- Solomon Islands
- Tuvalu
- Tonga
- Vanuatu (Host)
- Wallis and Futuna

== Pool Stage ==
=== Pool A ===
Teams	Pld	W	D	L	PF	PA	+/−	Pts
Fiji	4	4	0	0	149	5	+144	12
Solomon Islands	4	3	0	1	71	58	+13	10
New Caledonia	4	2	0	2	39	69	–33	8
Niue	4	1	0	3	25	91	–66	6
Tuvalu	4	0	0	4	26	87	–61	4

8 December

New Caledonia	17–5	Niue

Korman Stadium

8 December

Solomon Islands	26–14	Tuvalu

Korman Stadium

8 December

Fiji	43–0	New Caledonia

Korman Stadium

8 December

Niue	15–12	Tuvalu

Korman Stadium

8 December

Solomon Islands	21–10	New Caledonia

Korman Stadium

8 December

Fiji	43–0	Niue

Korman Stadium

8 December

Fiji	29–5	Solomon Islands

Korman Stadium

8 December

New Caledonia	12–0	Tuvalu

Korman Stadium

8 December

Fiji	34–0	Tuvalu

Korman Stadium

8 December

Solomon Islands	19–5	Niue

Korman Stadium

=== Pool B ===
Teams	Pld	W	D	L	PF	PA	+/−	Pts
Samoa	4	4	0	0	154	15	+139	12
Tonga	4	3	0	1	106	31	+75	10
Nauru	4	2	0	2	60	90	–30	8
Vanuatu	4	1	0	3	45	129	–84	6
Wallis and Futuna	4	0	0	4	32	132	–100	4

8 December

Tonga	33–0	Wallis and Futuna

Korman Stadium

8 December

Nauru	24–12	Vanuatu

Korman Stadium

8 December

Samoa	24–5	Tonga

Korman Stadium

8 December

Vanuatu	26–17	Wallis and Futuna

Korman Stadium

8 December

Tonga	32–0	Nauru

Korman Stadium

8 December

Samoa	42–5	Wallis and Futuna

Korman Stadium

8 December

Tonga	36–7	Vanuatu

Korman Stadium

8 December

Samoa	36–5	Nauru

Korman Stadium

8 December

Samoa	52–0	Vanuatu

Korman Stadium

8 December

Nauru	31–10	Wallis and Futuna

Korman Stadium

== Knockout stage ==
=== Ninth–place playoff ===
9 December

Wallis and Futuna	19–14	Tuvalu

Korman Stadium

=== Plate Pool ===
9 December

New Caledonia	24–0	Vanuatu

Korman Stadium

9 December

Niue	15–0	Nauru

Korman Stadium

==== Seventh-place playoff ====
9 December

Vanuatu	12–7	Niue

Korman Stadium

==== Fifth-place playoff ====
9 December

New Caledonia	17–12	Nauru

Korman Stadium

=== Cup Semi-finals ===
Semi-finals
9 December
Samoa	33
Solomon Islands	0
9 December
Fiji	41
Tonga	7

Cup Final
9 December
Samoa	14
Fiji	7
3rd Place
9 December
Tonga	24
Solomon Islands	19

== Final rankings ==
Legend
Championship final
Qualified for 2018 Rugby World Cup Sevens

Rank	Team
1st place, gold medalist(s)	Samoa
2nd place, silver medalist(s)	Fiji
3rd place, bronze medalist(s)	Tonga
4	Solomon Islands
5	New Caledonia
6	Nauru
7	Vanuatu
8	Niue
9	Wallis and Futuna
10	Tuvalu
