= 2008 Wellington Sevens =

The Emirates Airline Wellington Sevens is played annually as part of the IRB Sevens World Series for international rugby sevens (seven-a-side version of rugby union). The 2008 competition, which took place on 1 and 2 February was the third Cup trophy in the 2007–08 IRB Sevens World Series.

== Pool stages ==
=== Pool A ===
Team	Pld	W	D	L	PF	PA	+/-	Pts
New Zealand	3	3	0	0	103	7	+96	9
Samoa	3	2	0	1	60	29	+31	7
Canada	3	1	0	2	37	95	-58	5
Papua New Guinea	3	0	0	3	21	90	-69	3

Date	Team 1	Score	Team 2
1 February 2008	New Zealand	43 – 0	Canada
1 February 2008	Samoa	22 – 0	Papua New Guinea
1 February 2008	New Zealand	41 – 0	Papua New Guinea
1 February 2008	Samoa	31 – 10	Canada
1 February 2008	Canada	27 – 21	Papua New Guinea
1 February 2008	New Zealand	19 – 7	Samoa

=== Pool B ===
Team	Pld	W	D	L	PF	PA	+/-	Pts
Fiji	3	3	0	0	88	28	+60	9
Wales	3	2	0	1	48	52	-4	7
Cook Islands	3	1	0	2	42	74	-32	5
England	3	0	0	3	29	53	-24	3

Date	Team 1	Score	Team 2
1 February 2008	Fiji	40 – 7	Wales
1 February 2008	England	17 – 21	Cook Islands
1 February 2008	Fiji	31 – 14	Cook Islands
1 February 2008	England	5 – 15	Wales
1 February 2008	Wales	26 – 7	Cook Islands
1 February 2008	Fiji	17 – 7	England

=== Pool C ===
Team	Pld	W	D	L	PF	PA	+/-	Pts
South Africa	3	3	0	0	86	28	+58	9
Australia	3	2	0	1	57	38	+19	7
Kenya	3	1	0	2	26	52	-26	5
France	3	0	0	3	21	72	-51	3

Date	Team 1	Score	Team 2
1 February 2008	South Africa	24 – 14	Australia
1 February 2008	Kenya	19 – 0	France
1 February 2008	South Africa	29 – 7	France
1 February 2008	Kenya	0 – 19	Australia
1 February 2008	Australia	24 – 14	France
1 February 2008	South Africa	33 – 7	Kenya

=== Pool D ===
Team	Pld	W	D	L	PF	PA	+/-	Pts
Scotland	3	2	1	0	52	19	+33	8
Tonga	3	2	0	1	57	50	+7	7
United States	3	1	1	1	31	52	-21	6
Argentina	3	0	0	3	36	55	-19	3

Date	Team 1	Score	Team 2
1 February 2008	Argentina	7 – 17	United States
1 February 2008	Scotland	26 – 0	Tonga
1 February 2008	Argentina	17 – 19	Tonga
1 February 2008	Scotland	7 – 7	United States
1 February 2008	United States	7 – 38	Tonga
1 February 2008	Argentina	12 – 19	Scotland

== Knockout ==
=== Shield ===
Quarter-finals
2 February – Wellington, New Zealand
Canada	17
England	33
2 February – Wellington, New Zealand
United States	12
France	17
2 February – Wellington, New Zealand
Kenya	7
Argentina	19
2 February – Wellington, New Zealand
Cook Islands	24
Papua New Guinea	17

Semi-finals
2 February – Wellington, New Zealand
Canada	7
United States	19
2 February – Wellington, New Zealand
Kenya	38
Papua New Guinea	7

Final
2 February – Wellington, New Zealand
United States	22
Kenya	17

=== Bowl ===
Quarter-finals
2 February – Wellington, New Zealand
Canada	17
England	33
2 February – Wellington, New Zealand
United States	12
France	17
2 February – Wellington, New Zealand
Kenya	7
Argentina	19
2 February – Wellington, New Zealand
Cook Islands	24
Papua New Guinea	17

Semi-finals
2 February – Wellington, New Zealand
England	14
France	5
2 February – Wellington, New Zealand
Argentina	36
Cook Islands	5

Final
2 February – Wellington, New Zealand
England	12
Argentina	7

=== Plate ===
Quarter-finals
2 February – Wellington, New Zealand
New Zealand	40
Wales	5
2 February – Wellington, New Zealand
Scotland	7
Australia	31
2 February – Wellington, New Zealand
South Africa	10
Tonga	14
2 February – Wellington, New Zealand
Fiji	17
Samoa	19

Semi-finals
2 February – Wellington, New Zealand
Wales	24
Scotland	12
2 February – Wellington, New Zealand
South Africa	26
Fiji	19

Final
2 February – Wellington, New Zealand
Wales	12
South Africa	19

=== Cup ===
Quarter-finals
2 February – Wellington, New Zealand
New Zealand	40
Wales	5
2 February – Wellington, New Zealand
Scotland	7
Australia	31
2 February – Wellington, New Zealand
South Africa	10
Tonga	14
2 February – Wellington, New Zealand
Fiji	17
Samoa	19

Semi-finals
2 February – Wellington, New Zealand
New Zealand	32
Australia	7
2 February – Wellington, New Zealand
Tonga	21
Samoa	24

Final
2 February – Wellington, New Zealand
New Zealand	22
Samoa	17

== Round 3 table ==
Pos.	Country	(Emirate of Dubai)	(South Africa)	(New Zealand)	(United States)	(Hong Kong)	(Australia)	(England)	(Scotland)	Overall
1	New Zealand	20	20	20						60
2	Fiji	16	16	4						36
3	South Africa	12	12	8						32
4	Samoa	6	4	16						26
5	Argentina	8	12	0						20
6	Australia	2	0	12						14
6	England	12	0	2						14
8	Kenya	4	8	0						12
8	Tonga	–	–	12						12
8	Scotland	4	4	4						12
11	Wales	0	2	6						8
12	United States	0	6	0						6
13	France	0	0	0						0
13	Canada	0	0	0						0
13	Zimbabwe	0	0	–						0
13	Tunisia	0	0	–						0
13	Papua New Guinea	–	–	0						0
13	Cook Islands	–	–	0						0
13	Uganda	–	0	–						0
13	Arabian Gulf	0	–	–						0

Fiji was the second team to score over 1,000 overall points in the Group Stage of this tournament.
