= Guam national rugby sevens team =

Guam
- Union: Guam Rugby Football Union
- Coach: Peter Baggetta
- Captain: Chris Sgro
Team kit

The Guam national rugby sevens team competed at the 2009 Hong Kong Sevens. They participated at the 2015 Pacific Games in Papua New Guinea.

== Players ==
=== Previous Squads ===
Squad to 2015 Pacific Games:

- Christopher Sgro
- Robert Leon Guerrero
- Brian Ramiro
- Edward Calvo
- Gerard Aguon
- Vinson Calvo
- Paul Eustaquio
- Sixto Quintanilla III
- Jesse Perez
- Johnny Borga
- Ezra Sablan
- Christopher Wintterie

== Tournament History ==
=== Pacific Games ===
Pacific Games
Year	Round	Position	Pld	W	D	L
(Guam) 1999	Plate Semifinal	N/A	5	1	0	4
(Fiji) 2003	9th Place Play-off	10th	5	1	0	4
(Samoa) 2007	Did Not Compete					
(New Caledonia) 2011	Did Not Compete					
(Papua New Guinea) 2015	9th Place Play-off	9th	5	1	0	4
(Samoa) 2019	Did Not Compete					
(Solomon Islands) 2023	TBD					
Total	0 Titles	3/6	15	3	0	12

=== 2009 Sevens RWC Qualifier: Asia ===
Group D

Team	Pld	W	D	L	PF	PA	+/-	Pts
China	2	2	0	0	52	17	+35	6
Malaysia	2	1	0	1	50	24	+26	4
Guam	2	0	0	2	12	71	+59	2

Date	Team 1	Score	Team 2
2008-10-04	China	33 – 7	Guam
2008-10-04	Malaysia	38 – 5	Guam
2008-10-04	China	19 – 12	Malaysia

== See also ==
- Rugby union in Guam
- Guam national rugby union team (XV)
