= Tonga national rugby sevens team =

^{Tonga}
- Union: Tonga Rugby Football Union
- Nickname: 'Ikale Tahi
- Coach: Tevita Tu'ifua
- Captain: Fautasi Mau
Team kit	Change kit

World Cup Sevens
- Appearances: 7 (First in 1993)
- Best result: 7th (1993)

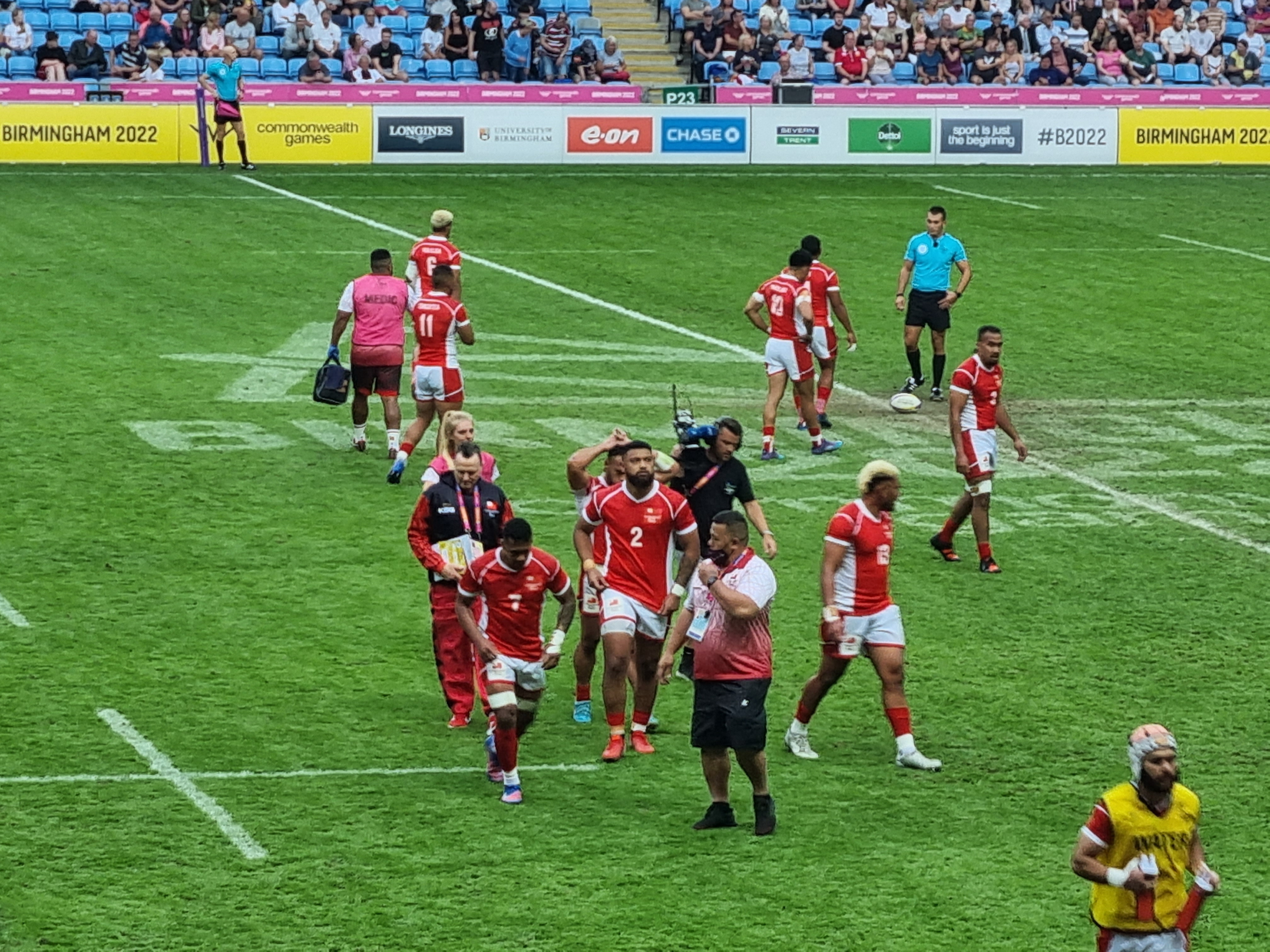
Team Tonga at the 2022 Commonwealth Games.

The Tonga national rugby sevens team competes in the World Rugby Sevens Series. Tonga has participated in all but one of the Rugby World Cup Sevens tournaments.

== World Rugby Sevens Series ==
2008–09 IRB Sevens World Series

Tonga have participated in only a few rounds of the World Rugby Sevens Series so far. They managed the bowl final in their first round of this series in Wellington, they won 24–56 over Cook Islands.

2009 Wellington Sevens

Tonga were in pool "A" along with Scotland, South Africa and Kenya for the Wellington round of the IRB World Sevens Series.

Stages	Team	Pts	Team
1	Kenya	21–35	Tonga
2	South Africa	22–65	Tonga
3	Scotland	15–21	Tonga
1/4 final bowl	Niue	0–21	Tonga
Semi-final bowl	France	5–28	Tonga
Final bowl	Cook Islands	24–56	Tonga

2015 Hong Kong Sevens

Tonga played in the World Series Qualifier in the 2015 Hong Kong Sevens. They only managed one win against Guyana 7s.

=== Challenger Series ===
Tonga have participated in the World Rugby Sevens Challenger Series, the competition to gain promotion to the World Rugby Sevens Series. They finished 6th in 2020 and 7th in 2022, failing to gain promotion.

Tonga finished first in the 2023 Challenger Series, thereby gaining entry to the London Sevens core team qualifier for the 2023–24 season. They also competed in the 2024 Challenger Series; the first round was held in Dubai where they finished sixth. They ended the Challenger Series in seventh place overall.

== Tournament history ==
=== Rugby World Cup Sevens ===
World Cup record
Year	Round	Position	Pld	W	L	D
(Scotland) 1993	Quarterfinalists	7th	8	4	4	0
(Hong Kong) 1997	Plate Winners	9th	7	5	2	0
(Argentina) 2001	Did not qualify					
(Hong Kong) 2005	Bowl Semifinalists	19th	6	2	5	0
(United Arab Emirates) 2009	Plate Semifinalists	11th	5	3	2	0
(Russia) 2013	Plate Quarterfinalists	13th	4	1	3	0
(United States) 2018	21st Place Final	22nd	4	1	3	0
(South Africa) 2022	19th Place Final	20th	4	1	3	0
Total	0 Titles	7/8	38	17	22	0

Tonga's first appearance was at the 1993 Rugby World Cup Sevens held in Scotland. They finished at the top of their pool and progressed to the finals with four wins and a loss to the hosts. The quarter finals were another round robin with teams split into two pools. Tonga lost all their games and finished in seventh place overall.

The 1997 Rugby World Cup Sevens was held in the mecca of sevens rugby Hong Kong. The tournament was played over three days. Day 1 and 2 had a total of eight pools with three teams per pool. Teams were seeded at the end of Day 1 and assigned to their various pools for Day 2. Tonga had a win against Japan and a loss to New Zealand.

Tonga's pool on Day 2 was a repeat of Day 1 with Japan and New Zealand being pooled together with them. Day 2 yielded the same results as the previous day. They were placed in the Plate quarterfinals and recorded wins against Wales, the Cook Islands and the hosts, Hong Kong to win the Plate and finish in ninth place.

The 2001 Rugby World Cup Sevens was held in Argentina. Tonga did not qualify.

Hong Kong hosted the Sevens World Cup in 2005 for a second time. Tonga finished at the bottom of their pool and ended up in the Bowl quarterfinals where they defeated Chinese Taipei 28 – 19. They lost to Canada in the semi-finals 7 – 0 and finished in their lowest rankings at a World Cup in 19th place.

Tonga qualified for the 2009 World Cup in the Oceania region. The United Arab Emirates were the hosts for the 2009 Rugby World Cup Sevens. They were in Pool A and played against Arabian Gulf 7s, Italy 7s and New Zealand 7s. Tonga were second in their pool with two wins and a loss. They made it to the Plate quarterfinals and beat Tunisia 24 – 7. However, they lost to Australia in the semis 22 – 19. They finished in eleventh place overall.

Russia were the hosts for the 2013 Rugby World Cup Sevens. Tonga won over Uruguay and advanced to the Plate quarterfinals from their pool. They lost to Canada 26 – 0 and finished in 13th place.

=== Olympics ===
Olympic Games record
Year	Round	Position	Pld	W	L	D
(Brazil) 2016	Did not qualify					
(Japan) 2020	Did not qualify					
(France) 2024	To be determined					
Total		0/0	0	0	0	0

Tonga finished second behind Australia at the 2015 Oceania Sevens Championship, and thus failed to advance to the 2016 Summer Olympics. Tonga also played in the 2019 Oceania Sevens Championship, but failed to qualify for the 2020 Summer Olympics.

=== Commonwealth Games ===
Commonwealth Games record
Year	Round	Position	Pld	W	L	D
(Malaysia) 1998	Plate Semifinalists	11th	6	3	3	0
(England) 2002	Bowl Finalists	10th	6	3	3	0
(Australia) 2006	Bowl Finalists	10th	6	3	3	0
(India) 2010	Bowl Semifinalists	11th	5	2	3	0
(Scotland) 2014	Did not qualify					
(Australia) 2018	Did not qualify					
(England) 2022	9th–12th Place Semi-finals	=11th	5	2	3	0
Total	0 Titles	5/7	28	13	15	0

=== Pacific Games ===
Pacific Games
Year	Round	Position	Pld	W	D	L
(Guam) 1999	Did Not Compete					
(Fiji) 2003	Bronze Final	4th	6	2	0	4
(Samoa) 2007	Did Not Compete					
(New Caledonia) 2011	Did Not Compete					
(Papua New Guinea) 2015	Bronze Final	3rd place, bronze medalist(s)	7	5	0	2
(Samoa) 2019	Bronze Final	3rd place, bronze medalist(s)	5	4	1	0
(Solomon Islands) 2023	Bronze Final	3rd place, bronze medalist(s)	5	4	0	1
Total	0 Titles	4/7	23	15	1	7

=== Oceania Sevens ===
Oceania Sevens
Year	Round	Position	Pld	W	D	L
(Samoa) 2008	Cup Final	2nd place, silver medalist(s)	5	4	0	1
(French Polynesia) 2009	Cup Final	2nd place, silver medalist(s)	8	6	0	2
(Australia) 2010	Bronze Final	3rd place, bronze medalist(s)	6	4	0	2
(Samoa) 2011	Bronze Final	3rd place, bronze medalist(s)	7	4	1	2
(Australia) 2012	Bronze Final	3rd place, bronze medalist(s)	6	3	0	3
(Fiji) 2013	Did Not Compete					
(Australia) 2014	Plate Final	6th	6	2	0	4
(New Zealand) 2015	Cup Final	2nd place, silver medalist(s)	6	4	0	2
(Fiji) 2016	5th Place Playoff	5th	6	4	0	2
(Fiji) 2017	— (Note: Due to adverse weather conditions affecting the schedule of games, all classification finals except the fifth-place playoff and Championship Final were cancelled. The fifth-place match was played because of qualification implications.)	7th	4	1	0	3
(Fiji) 2018	5th Place Playoff	5th	6	4	0	2
(Fiji) 2019	5th Place Playoff	5th	5	4	0	1
(Australia) 2021	Did Not Compete					
(New Zealand) 2022	Round-robin	4th	6	0	0	6
(New Zealand) 2022	Round-robin	1st place, gold medalist(s)	5	0	0	5
(Australia) 2023	5th Place Playoff	5th	5	4	0	1
Total	0 Titles	14/16	81	44	1	36

== Players ==
Squad for the 2024 World Rugby Sevens Challenger Series in Dubai.

No.	Players
1	Sione Tupou
3	Siaosi Huihui
4	Semisi Ma'asi
6	Tevita Eukaliti
7	Sioeli Filimoehala
9	John Ika
10	Atieli Pakalani
20	Sione Lemek
22	Tali Finau
29	Potolaka Ma'ake
73	Walter Fifita
77	Bray Taumoefolau

=== Notable players ===
- Malakai Fekitoa (Former All Black)
- Jack Ram
- Afusipa Taumoepeau
