= Kiribati national rugby sevens team =

Kiribati
- Union: Kirbati Rugby Union

First international
- Papua New Guinea 33–0 Kiribati (Gatton, Australia; 19 November 2022)

Largest defeat
- Fiji 76–0 Kiribati (Honiara, Solomon Islands; 24 November 2023)

World Cup Sevens
- Best result: 0

The Kiribati national rugby sevens team represents Kiribati in Rugby sevens. They played their first international match in 2022.

== History ==
Kiribati made history at the 2022 Oceania Rugby Sevens Challenge tournament in Brisbane when they fielded their first-ever rugby team to represent their nation at an international level. Tambwereti Arimaere scored his country's first international try. They faced Niue in the seventh place playoff but were defeated 36–7, and finished in eighth place overall.

Kiribati featured at the 2023 Oceania Sevens Championship where they finished in fourteenth place.

== Players ==
Squad to the 2023 Pacific Games:

Players
Tambwereti Arimaere
Maritino Neaua Ieremia
Barrie Uatu Karea
Aviata Kenana
Tikieru Kenana
Tiito Koito
Michael Maruia
Teaero Matikarai
Salom Mauteka
James Raurenti
Tekei Tanintoa
Titau Tautii

== Tournament History ==
=== Pacific Games ===
Pacific Games
Year	Round	Position	Pld	W	D	L
1999–2019	Did Not Compete					
(Solomon Islands) 2023	11th Place Playoff	12th	4	0	0	4
Total	0 Titles	1/7	4	0	0	4

=== Oceania Sevens ===
Oceania Sevens
Year	Round	Position	Pld	W	D	L
2008–22	Did Not Compete					
(Australia) 2023	13th Place Playoff	14th	5	0	0	5
Total	0 Titles	1/15	5	0	0	5

=== Oceania Rugby Sevens Challenge ===
Oceania Rugby Sevens Challenge
Year	Round	Position	Pld	W	D	L
(Australia) 2022	7th Place Playoff	8th	6	0	0	6
Total	0 Titles	1/1	6	0	0	6
