= Papua New Guinea national rugby sevens team =

Papua New Guinea
- Union: Papua New Guinea Rugby Football Union
- Nickname: The Pukpuks
- Coach: John Larry
- Captain: Bartholomew Levi
- Top scorer: Paul Joseph
Team kit

Largest win
- Papua New Guinea 62–0 Tahiti 7s _{(National Stadium, Honiara; 23 November 2023)}

Largest defeat
- Papua New Guinea 0-64 England 7s _{(Wellington; 3 February 2006)}

World Cup Sevens
- Appearances: 1 (First in 2018)

Medal record

Pacific Games
Silver medal – second place	1999 Santa Rita	Team
Bronze medal – third place	2007 Apia	Team
Bronze medal – third place	2011 Nouméa	Team

Oceania Sevens
Bronze medal – third place	2009 Papeete	Tournament

Oceania Sevens Challenge
Silver medal – second place	2022 Gatton	Tournament

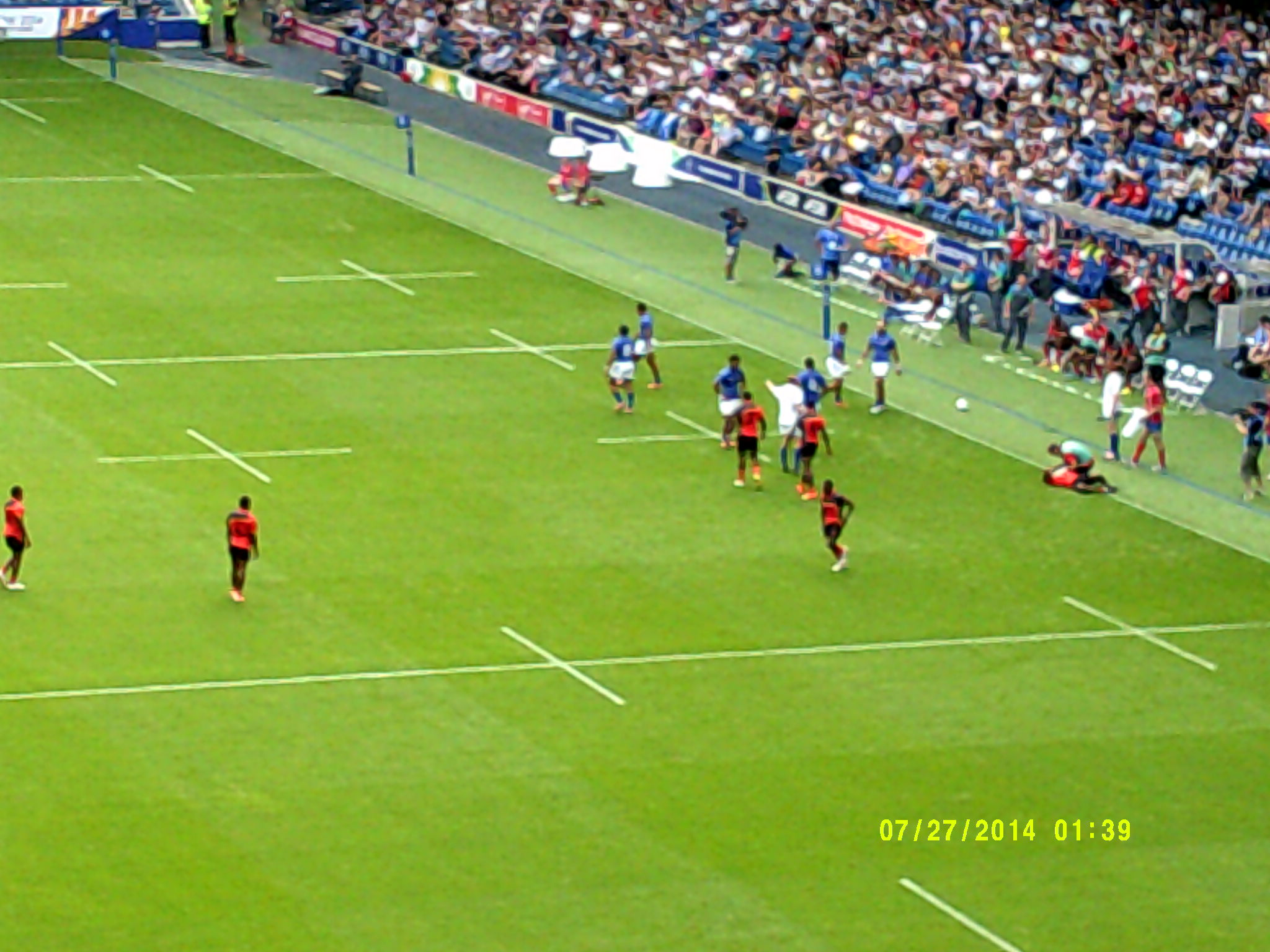
Samoa playing Papua New Guinea at the 2014 Commonwealth Games

The Papua New Guinea national rugby sevens team competes in the Pacific Games, Commonwealth Games, Challenger Series and the Oceania Sevens. They finished third in 2009 and fourth in 2010, 2015, 2016 and 2023 in the Oceania Sevens. They missed out on a maiden Olympic spot after being defeated by Samoa 24–0 in the 2023 Oceania 7s Olympic Playoff.

Papua New Guinea has also played the Hong Kong Sevens World Series qualifier. In the 2015 edition, they went to the semifinals, where they lost to Russia. In 2016 they lost all matches in the group phase. In 2017 they reached the semifinals.

PNG qualified for the 2010 Commonwealth Games and 2014 Commonwealth Games. Papua New Guinea made its first appearance at the Rugby World Cup Sevens in 2018, following its fifth-place finish at the 2017 Oceania Sevens Championship.

== Tournament history ==
=== World Cup Sevens ===
Rugby World Cup 7s
Year	Round	Position	P	W	L	D
(Scotland) 1993	Did not enter					
(Hong Kong) 1997	Did not qualify					
(Argentina) 2001	Did not qualify					
(Hong Kong) 2005	Did not qualify					
(United Arab Emirates) 2009	Did not qualify					
(Russia) 2013	Did not qualify					
(United States) 2018	21st playoff	21st	4	2	2	0
(South Africa) 2022	Did not qualify					
Total	0 Titles	1/8	4	2	2	0

=== Commonwealth Games ===
Commonwealth Games
Year	Round	Position	P	W	L	D
(Malaysia) 1998	Plate Final	10th	7	4	3	0
(England) 2002	Did not enter					
(Australia) 2006	Did not enter					
(India) 2010	Bowl Final	9th	6	4	2	0
(Scotland) 2014	11th playoff	11th	5	2	3	0
(Australia) 2018	Group stage	9th	3	1	2	0
(England) 2022	Did not enter					
Total	0 Titles	4/7	21	11	10	0

=== Pacific Games ===
Pacific Games
Year	Round	Position	P	W	L	D
(Guam) 1999	Final	2nd place, silver medalist(s)	5	4	1	0
(Fiji) 2003	Plate Final	5th	5	4	1	0
(Samoa) 2007	Bronze Final	3rd place, bronze medalist(s)	6	4	2	0
(New Caledonia) 2011	Bronze Final	3rd place, bronze medalist(s)	6	5	1	0
(Papua New Guinea) 2015	Bronze Final	4th	7	4	3	0
(Samoa) 2019	Did not enter					
(Solomon Islands) 2023	Bronze Final	4th	6	4	2	0
Total	0 Titles	6/7	35	25	10	0

=== Pacific Mini Games ===
Pacific Mini Games
Year	Round	Position	P	W	L	D
(American Samoa) 1997	Did not enter					
(Cook Islands) 2009	Bowl Final	6th	6	3	3	0
(Wallis and Futuna) 2013	Bronze Final	4th	8	3	5	0
(Vanuatu) 2017	Did not enter					
Total	0 Titles	2/4	14	6	8	0

=== Oceania Sevens ===
Oceania 7s
Year	Round	Position	P	W	L	D	Refs
(Samoa) 2008	Plate final	5th	5	3	2	0	
(French Polynesia) 2009	Third playoff	3rd place, bronze medalist(s)	8	4	4	0	
(Australia) 2010	Third playoff	4th	6	3	3	0	
(Samoa) 2011	7th playoff	7th	7	3	3	1	
(Australia) 2012	Plate Final	5th	6	4	2	0	
(Fiji) 2013	Plate Final	6th	6	2	4	0	
(Australia) 2014	Plate Final	5th	6	3	2	1	
(New Zealand) 2015	Third playoff	4th	6	3	3	0	
(Fiji) 2016	Third playoff	4th	6	3	3	0	
(Fiji) 2017	5th playoff	5th	6	4	2	0	
(Fiji) 2018	7th playoff	7th	5	2	3	0	
(Fiji) 2019	5th playoff	6th	5	3	2	0	
(Australia) 2021	did not attend						
(New Zealand) 2022	withdrew						
(Australia) 2023	Olympic Qualifying Final	4th	6	4	2	0	
Total	0 Titles	12/14	72	37	33	2	

==== Oceania Sevens Challenge ====
Oceania 7s Challenge
Year	Round	Position	P	W	L	D
(Australia) 2022	Final	2nd place, silver medalist(s)	5	3	2	0

== World Rugby Sevens ==
=== World Rugby sevens series ===
The Pukpuks Sevens have participated as an invited team to selected tournaments across 10 seasons on the world series circuit since the inaugural season in 1999–2000. Historically, they have participated in 18 tournaments particularly the New Zealand Sevens (2000–2002, 2004, 2008, 2011, 2015, 2017 and 2018), Australian Sevens (2000, 2002, 2011, 2017 and 2018), Fiji Sevens (2000), Japan Sevens(2000) and the Hong Kong Sevens (2002). To date, Papua New Guinea have played a total 127 matches accumulating 237 tries and 1507 points overall. Their best all-time season finish is 12th placing from the inaugural season in 1999–2000.

World Rugby Sevens Series record
Season	Rounds	Position	Points
1999–00	4 / 10	12th	8
2000–01	1 / 9	—N/a	0
2001–02	3 / 11	—N/a	0
2003–04	1 / 8	—N/a	0
2007–08	1 / 8	—N/a	0
2010–11	2 / 8	—N/a	0
2011–12	1 / 9	21st	3
2014–15	1 / 9	21st	1
2016–17	2 / 10	18th	2
2017–18	2 / 10	17th	6

==== Player records ====
The following shows leading career Papua New Guinean players based on performance in the World Rugby Sevens Series.

Tries scored
No.	Player	Tries
1	Paul Joseph	29
2	Albert Levi	12
2	Kevin Vitolo	12
4	Henry Liliket	9
4	Aiem Pilokos	9
4	Willie Tirang	9

Points scored
No.	Player	Points
1	Paul Joseph	291
2	Albert Levi	80
3	Kevin Vitolo	70
4	Henry Liliket	47
4	Raymond Yauieb	47

Matches played
No.	Player	Matches
1	Paul Joseph	33
2	Douglas Guise	29
3	Eugene Tokavai	25
4	Montgomery Diave	20
4	Gairo Kapana	20
4	Henry Liliket	20
4	Kevin Vitolo	20

=== World Rugby Sevens Challenger Series ===
Papua New Guinea have appeared in every edition of the World Rugby Sevens Challenger Series since the inaugural season in 2020. This was through qualification for being one of two highest ranked non-core World Rugby Sevens Series teams from the Oceania Sevens Championship.

World Rugby Sevens Challenger Series record
Season	Rounds	Position	Points
2020	2 / 2	11th	16
2022	1 / 1	11th	—N/a
2023	2 / 2	9th	9
2024	3 / 3	11th	6

== Current squad ==
Squad to 2024 World Rugby Sevens Challenger Series - Men's tour
- Lawrence LAMOND (Debut- Germany 7s)
- Jaybes PANGAS (Debut- Germany 7s)
- Bernard TOALBERT (Debut- Germany 7s)
- Bartholomew LEVI (c) (Debut- Germany 7s)
- Nason BENJAMIN (Debut- Germany 7s)
- Paul Peter TONO
- Emmanuel ZORIRY (Debut- Germany 7s)
- Rex PEREGUA (Debut- Germany 7s)
- Ben LASIEL (Debut- Germany 7s)
- Elipas TATAENG (Debut- Germany 7s)
- Himson TUKAR (Debut- Germany 7s)
- Kolin TOKAU (Debut- Germany 7s)

=== Previous squads ===
Squad to the 2023 Pacific Games:

Players
Derrick Voku
Emmanuel Alfred
Benjamin Boas
Benson Hayai
Benjamin Kennedy
Mhustapha Kura
Kunak Late
Kadum Mais
Richard Mautu
Shaun Ongapa
Edward Ramit
Jacky Winas

Squad to the 2023 Oceania 7s:

Players
Derrick Voku
Emmanuel Alfred
Benjamin Boas
Benson Hayai
Benjamin Kennedy
Mhustapha Kura
Kunak Late
Kadum Mais
Richard Mautu
Shaun Ongapa
Edward Ramit
Jacky Winas

Squad to 2023 World Rugby Sevens Challenger Series - Men's tour
- Maluai PATALA
- Dickson Morrison
- Shaun ONGAPA
- Benjamin BOAS
- Paul Peter TONO
- Eliud HOSEA (c)
- Derrick VOKU
- Mustapha KURA Goena
- Kunak LATE
- Kadum MAIS
- Kennedy BENJAMIN
- Benjamin WAHUNE

Squad to the 2022 Oceania 7s:

Players
Derrick Voku
Emmanuel Alfred
Benjamin Boas
Benson Hayai
Benjamin Kennedy
Mhustapha Kura
Kunak Late
Kadum Mais
Richard Mautu
Shaun Ongapa
Edward Ramit
Jacky Winas

Squad to 2022 World Rugby Sevens Challenger Series - Men's tour
- Maluai PATALA
- Dickson Morrison
- Shaun ONGAPA
- Benjamin BOAS
- Paul Peter TONO
- Eliud HOSEA (c)
- Derrick VOKU
- Mustapha KURA Goena
- Kunak LATE
- Kadum MAIS
- Kennedy BENJAMIN
- Benjamin WAHUNE

== See also ==
- Rugby union in Papua New Guinea
- Papua New Guinea women's national rugby sevens team
- Papua New Guinea national rugby union team
- Papua New Guinea women's national rugby union team
