= Niue national rugby sevens team =

Niue
- Union: Niue Rugby Football Union
- President: Tony Edwards
- Coach: Leonale Bourke/Chance Bunce
- Captain: Shaun atamu/Jordan Bunce
Team kit

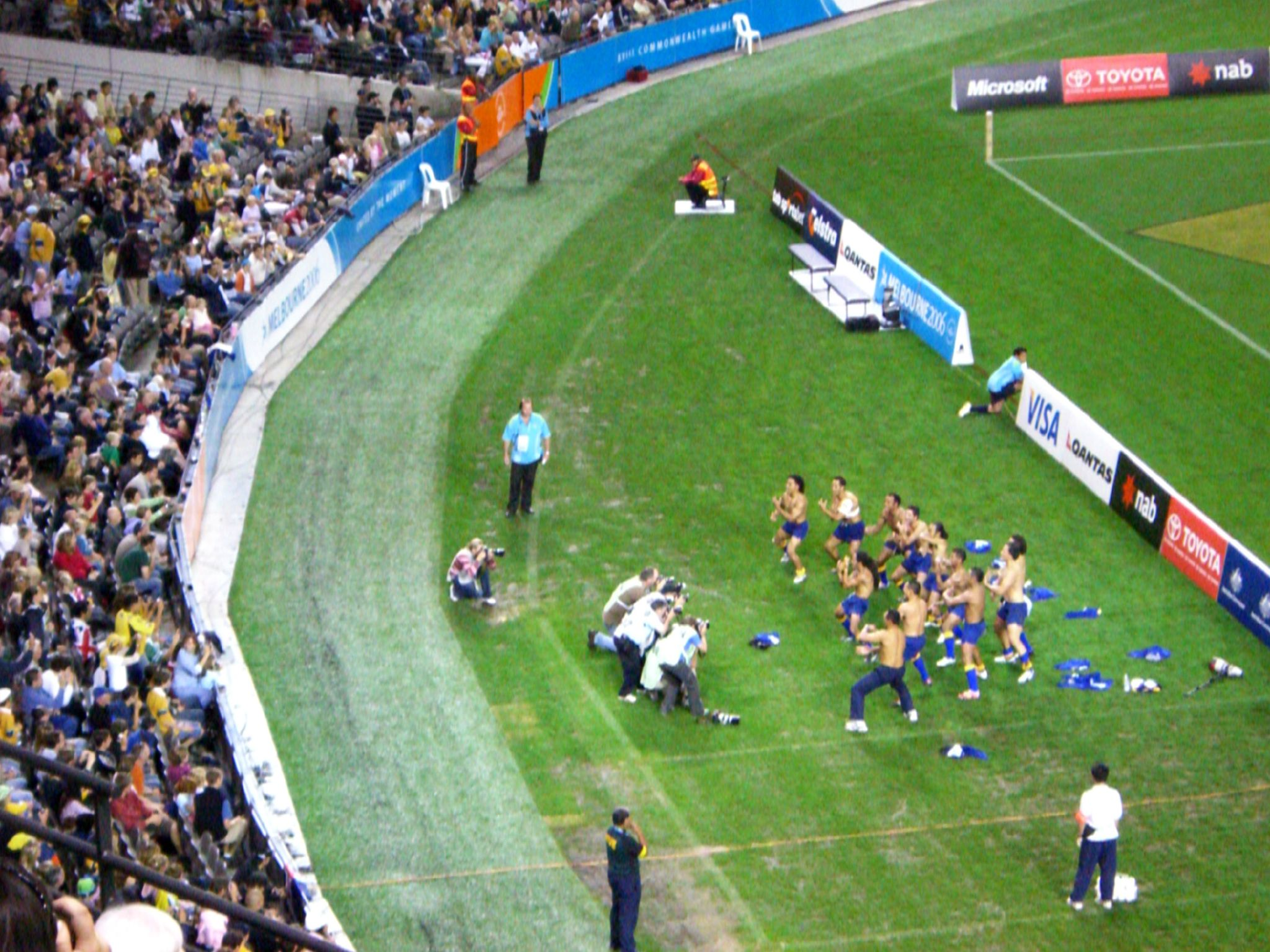
The Niue team performing a meke

The Niue national rugby sevens team is a minor national sevens side. They have participated in two Commonwealth Games — in 2002 and 2006. They also compete in the Oceania Rugby Sevens Championship, Pacific Games and the HSBC world series

== Background ==
In September 2000, Niue competed in their first IRB international tournament when they attended the Oceania qualifiers for the World Cup in Rarotonga. They were invited to the 2001 Wellington Sevens as replacements for France who withdrew from the tournament.

They were pooled with New Zealand and Samoa at the 2004 Wellington Sevens. At the 2006 Wellington Sevens they were edged out by Scotland in the Bowl quarterfinals.

In 2009, they were drawn in the same pool with New Zealand, Australia, and Wales for the Wellington Sevens. They featured at the Adelaide and Wellington Sevens in 2010, and participated in the 2011 Gold Coast Sevens.

Niue competed at the 2023 Oceania Sevens Championship in Brisbane; they finished 15th overall after losing all four of their matches.

== Tournament History ==
=== Commonwealth Games ===
Commonwealth Games
| Year | Round | Position | Pld | W | D | L |
|---|---|---|---|---|---|---|
| (Malaysia) 1998 | Did not qualify | | | | | |
| (England) 2002 | Bowl Quarter-final | — | 4 | 0 | 0 | 4 |
| (Australia) 2006 | Bowl Quarter-final | — | 4 | 0 | 0 | 4 |
| (India) 2010 | Did not qualify | | | | | |
| (Scotland) 2014 | Did not qualify | | | | | |
| (Australia) 2018 | Did not qualify | | | | | |
| (England) 2022 | Did not qualify | | | | | |
| Total | 0 Titles | 2/7 | 8 | 0 | 0 | 8 |

=== Pacific Games ===
Pacific Games
| Year | Round | Position | Pld | W | D | L |
|---|---|---|---|---|---|---|
| (Guam) 1999 | Did Not Compete | | | | | |
| (Fiji) 2003 | 5th Place Playoff | 6th | 6 | 3 | 0 | 3 |
| (Samoa) 2007 | Did Not Compete | | | | | |
| (New Caledonia) 2011 | Bronze Final | 4th | 6 | 2 | 0 | 4 |
| (Papua New Guinea) 2015 | Did Not Compete | | | | | |
| (Samoa) 2019 | Did Not Compete | | | | | |
| (Solomon Islands) 2023 | TBD | | | | | |
| Total | 0 Titles | 2/6 | 12 | 5 | 0 | 7 |

=== Oceania Sevens ===
Oceania Sevens
| Year | Round | Position | Pld | W | D | L |
|---|---|---|---|---|---|---|
| (Samoa) 2008 | Bronze Final | 4th | 5 | 2 | 0 | 3 |
| (French Polynesia) 2009 | Bronze Final | 4th | 8 | 5 | 0 | 3 |
| (Australia) 2010 | 5th Place Playoff | 6th | 6 | 2 | 0 | 4 |
| (Samoa) 2011 | 7th Place Playoff | 8th | 7 | 2 | 0 | 5 |
| (Australia) 2012 | Did Not Compete | | | | | |
| (Fiji) 2013 | Did Not Compete | | | | | |
| (Australia) 2014 | Bowl Final | 10th | 5 | 1 | 0 | 4 |
| (New Zealand) 2015 | Did Not Compete | | | | | |
| (Fiji) 2016 | Did Not Compete | | | | | |
| (Fiji) 2017 | Did Not Compete | | | | | |
| (Fiji) 2018 | Pool Stage | 13th | 3 | 0 | 0 | 3 |
| (Fiji) 2019 | Pool Stage | 15th | 4 | 0 | 0 | 4 |
| (Australia) 2021 | Did Not Compete | | | | | |
| (New Zealand) 2022 | Did Not Compete | | | | | |
| (Australia) 2023 | Pool Stage | 15 | 4 | 0 | 0 | 4 |
| Total | 0 Titles | 8/15 | 42 | 12 | 0 | 30 |

== Players ==
=== Current Squad ===
2023 Oceania

- Regan Atamu
- Shaun Atamu
- Jordan Bunce
- Navajo Doyle
- Lepau Feau
- Nofoaiga Limoni
- Le’monté Richmond
- Willie Sionetali
- Isaac Tamapeau
- Raven Togiafofoa
- Kegan Tuhega
- Mikey Williams

Head Coach Leonale bourke

          Chance bunce

=== Previous Squad ===
2011 Gold Coast Sevens

- Leonale Bourke (vc)
- Matt Faleuka (c)
- Uani Talagi
- Rudolf Ainuu
- Hayden Head
- Tony Pulu
- Vincent Pihigia
- Sanualio Sakalia
- Zac Makavilitogia
- Kenny Akulu
- Huggard Tongatule
- Ricki Helagi

== See also ==
- Niue national rugby union team (XV)
