= Vanuatu national rugby sevens team =

Vanuatu
- Union: Vanuatu Rugby Football Union

World Cup Sevens
- Appearances: 0

The Vanuatu national rugby sevens team is Vanuatu's representative in rugby sevens.

== History ==
At the 1999 South Pacific Games held in Guam, Vanuatu won its second rugby medal, defeating Solomon Islands for the bronze in the rugby 7s. The first bronze medal had been won for the rugby 15's in 1966, as New Hebrides.

In the 2000 Telecom Oceania Sevens held in Rarotonga, Vanuatu went on to beat Tahiti 31–0 to win the Bowl. The tournament was a qualifier for the 2001 Rugby World Cup Sevens and the last World Cup place was taken by the Cook Islands, who won the Oceania Sevens Cup.

At the 2011 Pacific Games, Vanuatu finished in 9th place, defeating Tahiti 7–17.

In 2023, at the Oceania Sevens Championship, they played the Oceania Barbarians in the ninth place playoff and finished in tenth place.

== Players ==
=== Current squad ===
Vanuatu's squad to the 2023 Pacific Games in Honiara, Solomon Islands:

Players
Lachlan Hillary Bani
Pechan Benjiman
Keleto David
Yen Felix
Andrew Desmond Kaltongga
Batick Nally
Pedro Sablon
Seal Taiwia
Naitika Tivivi
Adam Tumukon
Keane Williams

=== Previous squads ===
2015 Pacific Games – Sevens Squad
Koko Kalsal • George Kalpausi Sablan • Akuila Ita Kalsakau • Jeffrey Saurei • Antoine Sablan • Waute Chichirua
Taputu Kalpukai • Steven Jacob Shem • Claude Raymond • Omari Kalmet Bakokoto • Malau Tevita Tai • Graham Malon Tungan

2011 Pacific Games – Sevens Squad
Claude Raymond • Koko Kalsal • Toara Dick Toara • Waute Chichirua • Andro Kalpukai • Antoine Sablan
Jeffrey Saurei • Steven Jacob Shem • James Kalsal • Omari Kalmet Kakokoto • Bill Vanu • Tonny Lui

== Tournament history ==
=== Pacific Games ===
Pacific Games
Year	Round	Position	Pld	W	D	L
(Guam) 1999	Bronze Final	3rd place, bronze medalist(s)	6	4	0	2
(Fiji) 2003	7th Place Playoff	N/A	5	1	0	4
(Samoa) 2007	7th Place Playoff	8th	6	1	0	5
(New Caledonia) 2011	9th Place Playoff	9th	5	2	0	3
(Papua New Guinea) 2015	7th Place Playoff	8th	7	1	0	6
(Samoa) 2019	Did Not Compete					
(Solomon Islands) 2023	7th Place Playoff	7th	5	2	0	3
Total	0 Titles	6/7	34	11	0	23

=== Oceania Sevens ===
Oceania Sevens
Year	Round	Position	Pld	W	D	L
(Samoa) 2008	7th Place Playoff	7th	5	2	0	3
(French Polynesia) 2009	Plate Final	6th	8	2	0	6
(Australia) 2010	7th Place Playoff	8th	6	0	0	6
2011–16	Did Not Compete					
(Fiji) 2017	9–12th Place Playoff	11th (Note: Due to adverse weather conditions affecting the schedule of games, all classification finals except the fifth-place playoff and Championship Final were cancelled. The fifth-place match was played because of qualification implications.)	4	1	0	3
(Fiji) 2018	9th Place Playoff	10th	4	1	0	3
(Fiji) 2019	13th Place Playoff	13th	6	2	0	4
(Australia) 2021	Did Not Compete					
(New Zealand) 2022	Challenge 5th Place Playoff	6th	7	1	0	6
(Australia) 2023	9th Place Playoff	10th	5	2	0	3
Total	0 Titles	8/15	45	11	0	34

== See also ==
- Rugby union in Vanuatu
- Vanuatu national rugby union team
