= Rugby sevens at the 1997 South Pacific Mini Games =

Men's rugby sevens at the 1997 Pacific Mini Games
- Location: Pago Pago, American Samoa
- Dates: 12 August 1997
- Teams: 4

Medalists
gold medal	Samoa
silver medal	American Samoa
bronze medal	Solomon Islands

Rugby sevens for the 1997 South Pacific Mini Games was held in Pago Pago, American Samoa and took place on 12 August. There were only four teams that contested the event.

Samoa claimed the gold medal after defeating American Samoa in the final. The Solomon Islands took bronze with their win against Niue.

== Results ==
=== Pool Stage ===
Teams	Pld	W	D	L	PF	PA	+/−	
Samoa	3	3	0	0	81	12	+69	Gold medal final
American Samoa	3	2	0	1	27	36	–9	Gold medal final
Solomon Islands	3	1	0	2	33	44	–11	Bronze Playoff
Niue	3	0	0	3	20	69	–49	Bronze Playoff

12 August

Samoa	31–0	Niue

12 August

American Samoa	10–0	Solomon Islands

12 August

American Samoa	12–5	Niue

12 August

Samoa	19–7	Solomon Islands

12 August

Solomon Islands	26–15	Niue

12 August

Samoa	31–5	American Samoa

=== Finals ===
==== Bronze medal playoff ====
12 August

Solomon Islands	25–17	Niue

==== Gold medal final ====
12 August

Samoa	57–0	American Samoa
