= 2022 Oceania Sevens Championship =

- Host nation: New Zealand
- Date: 24–26 June 2022

Cup
- Champion: New Zealand
- Runner-up: Australia VII Selection

Tournament details
- Matches played: 12

The 2022 Oceania Sevens Championship was held in Pukekohe, New Zealand on 24–26 June 2022. The event was the fourteenth Oceania Sevens tournament in men's rugby sevens. The competition was the final official tournament for Oceania Rugby national teams ahead of the Commonwealth Games Sevens in Birmingham. It was played as a double round-robin format at Navigation Homes Stadium. New Zealand won the tournament, with Australia VII Selection as runner-up.

== Teams ==
Only four teams competed at the 2022 men's tournament, after Papua New Guinea was forced to withdraw due to travel logistics. The teams were:

- Australia VII Selection
- Fiji
- New Zealand
- Tonga

== Championship ==
Each team's schedule mirrored the Commonwealth Games three-day format, with two matches played by each team per day. Each team played the other three teams twice. The highest ranked team after all matches were completed was declared the champion.

=== Standings ===
Pos	Team	P	W	D	L	PF	PA	PD	Pts
1	New Zealand	6	5	0	1	168	60	+108	16
2	Australia VII	6	4	0	2	163	102	+61	14
3	Fiji	6	3	0	3	131	96	+35	12
4	Tonga	6	0	0	6	36	240	–204	6

=== Round 1 ===
24 Jun
11:00

New Zealand	38–0	Tonga

Navigation Homes Stadium, Pukekohe

24 Jun
11:24

Australia VII	29–19	Fiji

Navigation Homes Stadium, Pukekohe

=== Round 2 ===
24 Jun
17:00

Fiji	24–12	Tonga

Navigation Homes Stadium, Pukekohe

24 Jun
17:24

Australia VII	19–35	New Zealand

Navigation Homes Stadium, Pukekohe

=== Round 3 ===
25 Jun
11:00

Australia VII	42–0	Tonga

Navigation Homes Stadium, Pukekohe

25 Jun
11:24

Fiji	5–19	New Zealand

Navigation Homes Stadium, Pukekohe

=== Round 4 ===
25 Jun
17:00

New Zealand	54–12	Tonga

Navigation Homes Stadium, Pukekohe

25 Jun
17:24

Australia VII	26–24	Fiji

Navigation Homes Stadium, Pukekohe

=== Round 5 ===
26 Jun
11:00

Fiji	47–5	Tonga

Navigation Homes Stadium, Pukekohe

26 Jun
11:24

Australia VII	12–17	New Zealand

Navigation Homes Stadium, Pukekohe

=== Round 6 ===
26 Jun
17:00

Australia VII	35–7	Tonga

Navigation Homes Stadium, Pukekohe

26 Jun
17:24

Fiji	12–5	New Zealand

Navigation Homes Stadium, Pukekohe

=== Placings ===
Place	Team
1st place, gold medalist(s)	New Zealand
2nd place, silver medalist(s)	Australia VII
3rd place, bronze medalist(s)	Fiji
4	Tonga

== Challenge ==
Tonga and Papua New Guinea finished first and second in the men's tournament of the Oceania Rugby Sevens Challenge to qualify for the 2023 World Rugby Sevens Challenger Series. The tournament was hosted by Australia at the Hugh Courtney Oval in Gatton, west of Brisbane.

Pool A Round 1

19 Nov
8:22 AM

Cook Islands	22–12	Vanuatu

Hugh Courtney Oval, UQ Gatton

19 Nov
8:44 AM

Tonga	22–21	Australia A

Hugh Courtney Oval, UQ Gatton

Pool B Round 1

19 Nov
10:34 AM

Solomon Islands	35–0	Niue

Hugh Courtney Oval, UQ Gatton

19 Nov
10:56 AM

Papua New Guinea	33–0	Kiribati

Hugh Courtney Oval, UQ Gatton

Pool A Round 2

19 Nov
1:32 PM

Australia A	31–5	Cook Islands

Hugh Courtney Oval, UQ Gatton

19 Nov
1:54 PM

Tonga	39–0	Vanuatu

Hugh Courtney Oval, UQ Gatton

Pool B Round 2

20 Nov
8:00 AM

Solomon Islands	50–0	Kiribati

Hugh Courtney Oval, UQ Gatton

20 Nov
8:22 AM

Papua New Guinea	12–14	Niue

Hugh Courtney Oval, UQ Gatton

Pool A Round 3

20 Nov
10:34 AM

Vanuatu	5–34	Australia A

Hugh Courtney Oval, UQ Gatton

20 Nov
10:58 AM

Tonga	42–5	Cook Islands

Hugh Courtney Oval, UQ Gatton

Pool B Round 3

20 Nov
1:54 PM

Niue	46–0	Kiribati

Hugh Courtney Oval, UQ Gatton

20 Nov
3:22 PM

Papua New Guinea	27–5	Solomon Islands

Hugh Courtney Oval, UQ Gatton

Finals

QF1: 20 Nov

Tonga	64–0	Vanuatu

Hugh Courtney Oval, UQ Gatton

QF2: 20 Nov

Solomon Islands	36–12	Vanuatu

Hugh Courtney Oval, UQ Gatton

QF3: 20 Nov

Papua New Guinea	19–26	Australia A

Hugh Courtney Oval, UQ Gatton

QF4: 20 Nov

Cook Islands	22–5	Kiribati

Hugh Courtney Oval, UQ Gatton

5th place: 20 Nov

Australia A	57–0	Niue

Hugh Courtney Oval, UQ Gatton

5th place: 20 Nov

Vanuatu	64–0	Kiribati

Hugh Courtney Oval, UQ Gatton

SF1: 20 Nov

Papua New Guinea	21–12	Cook Islands

Hugh Courtney Oval, UQ Gatton

SF2: 20 Nov

Tonga	36–0	Solomon Islands

Hugh Courtney Oval, UQ Gatton

7th place: 20 Nov

Niue	36–7	Kiribati

Hugh Courtney Oval, UQ Gatton

5th place: 20 Nov

Australia A	def.	Vanuatu

Hugh Courtney Oval, UQ Gatton

3rd place: 20 Nov

Cook Islands	abandoned	Solomon Islands

Hugh Courtney Oval, UQ Gatton

1st place: 20 Nov

Tonga	abandoned	Papua New Guinea

Hugh Courtney Oval, UQ Gatton

Challenge placings

Place	Team
1	Tonga
2	Papua New Guinea
3	Solomon Islands
4	Cook Islands
5	Australia A
6	Vanuatu
7	Niue
8	Kiribati

== See also ==
- 2022 Oceania Women's Sevens Championship
