= 2011 Oceania Sevens Championship =

Historical sports event

- Host nation: Samoa
- Date: 28–29 October 2011

Cup
- Champion: Samoa
- Runner-up: Fiji
- Third: Tonga

Plate
- Winner: Cook Islands
- Runner-up: American Samoa

Bowl
- Winner: New Caledonia
- Runner-up: Solomon Islands

The 2011 Oceania Sevens Championship was the fourth Oceania Sevens in men's rugby sevens. It was held at Apia Park in Samoa.

Samoa won the Oceania Sevens Championship by defeating Fiji 19 to 7. Tonga, Papua New Guinea, and Niue, as the three highest finishers excluding core teams Australia, Fiji, and Samoa, qualified for Gold Coast legs of the 2011–12 IRB Sevens World Series. Tonga also qualified for the 2012 Hong Kong Sevens.

== Pool stage ==
Key to colours in group tables
Teams that advanced to the Cup Quarterfinal

=== Pool A ===
Team	Pld	W	D	L	PF	PA	PD	Pts
Fiji	4	4	0	0	177	0	+177	12
Tonga	4	2	1	1	90	50	+40	9
Papua New Guinea	4	2	1	1	85	91	–6	9
American Samoa	4	1	0	3	60	115	–55	6
New Caledonia	4	0	0	4	19	175	–156	4

28 October 2011
10:00am

Tonga	19–19	Papua New Guinea

Apia Park, Samoa

28 October 2011
10:44am

American Samoa	38–7	New Caledonia

Apia Park, Samoa

28 October 2011
11:37am

Fiji	21–0	Tonga

Apia Park, Samoa

28 October 2011
11:59am

Papua New Guinea	21–17	American Samoa

Apia Park, Samoa

28 October 2011
1:14pm

New Caledonia	5–45	Tonga

Apia Park, Samoa

28 October 2011
1:36pm

Papua New Guinea	0–48	Fiji

Apia Park, Samoa

28 October 2011
2:51pm

American Samoa	5–26	Tonga

Apia Park, Samoa

28 October 2011
3:13pm

New Caledonia	0–47	Fiji

Apia Park, Samoa

28 October 2011
4:34pm

Papua New Guinea	45–7	New Caledonia

Apia Park, Samoa

28 October 2011
4:56pm

Fiji	61–0	American Samoa

Apia Park, Samoa

=== Pool B ===
Team	Pld	W	D	L	PF	PA	PD	Pts
Samoa	4	4	0	0	181	19	+162	12
Australia	4	3	0	1	100	74	+26	10
Niue	4	2	0	2	63	90	–27	8
Cook Islands	4	1	0	3	43	57	–14	6
Solomon Islands	4	0	0	4	31	118	–87	4

28 October 2011
10:22am

Samoa	47–0	Niue

Apia Park, Samoa

28 October 2011
11:06am

Cook Islands	19–7	Solomon Islands

Apia Park, Samoa

28 October 2011
12:21pm

Cook Islands	12–19	Niue

Apia Park, Samoa

28 October 2011
12:43pm

Samoa	35–12	Australia

Apia Park, Samoa

28 October 2011
1:58pm

Niue	27–7	Solomon Islands

Apia Park, Samoa

28 October 2011
2:20pm

Australia	31–12	Cook Islands

Apia Park, Samoa

28 October 2011
3:35pm

Solomon Islands	10–33	Australia

Apia Park, Samoa

28 October 2011
3:57pm

Cook Islands	0–60	Samoa

Apia Park, Samoa

28 October 2011
5:18pm

Niue	17–24	Australia

Apia Park, Samoa

28 October 2011
5:40pm

Solomon Islands	7–39	Samoa

Apia Park, Samoa

== Knockout stage ==
=== Bowl ===
9th–10th play-off
29 October 2011 - Apia Park, Samoa
New Caledonia	17
Solomon Islands	12

=== Plate ===
5th–8th semi-finals
29 October 2011 - Apia Park, Samoa
Cook Islands	10
Papua New Guinea	0
29 October 2011 - Apia Park, Samoa
Niue	5
American Samoa	17

5th–6th play-off
29 October 2011 - Apia Park, Samoa
Cook Islands	12
American Samoa	7
7th–8th play-off
29 October 2011 - Apia Park, Samoa
Papua New Guinea	12
Niue	5

=== Cup ===
Quarter-finals
29 October 2011 - Apia Park, Samoa
Fiji	41
Cook Islands	0
29 October 2011 - Apia Park, Samoa
Papua New Guinea	0
Australia	12
29 October 2011 - Apia Park, Samoa
Tonga	15
Niue	10
29 October 2011 - Apia Park, Samoa
American Samoa	0
Samoa	41

Semi-finals
29 October 2011 - Apia Park, Samoa
Fiji	33
Australia	5
29 October 2011 - Apia Park, Samoa
Tonga	0
Samoa	33

Final
29 October 2011 - Apia Park, Samoa
Fiji	11
Samoa	19
Third place
29 October 2011 - Apia Park, Samoa
Australia	12
Tonga	28
