= Oceania Rugby Men's Sevens Championship =

International rugby sevens competition

- Most recent season or competition: 2024 Oceania Sevens Championship
- Sport: Rugby sevens
- First season: 2008; 18 years ago
- Most recent champion: New Zealand (2023)
- Most titles: Fiji (5 titles)

The Oceania Rugby Men's Sevens Championship is an international rugby sevens competition organised by Oceania Rugby. It has been held regularly since 2008 to select the best men's national team in Oceania.

== Participating teams ==
Men's teams competing in the Oceania Sevens and their finishing positions are as follows (placings of home nations in bold):

Team	08	09	10	11	12	13	14	15	16	17	18	19	20	21	22	23	24	25
Oceania teams
American Samoa	–	–	–	6	6	5	8	7	7	7	–	9	–	–	–	13	13	Q
Australia	–	–	**1**	4	**1**	3	**4**	1	3	3*	4	1	–	**3**	2	**7**	5	Q
Cook Islands	3	5	5	5	4	4	7	5	6	6	6	10	–	–	–	8	6	Q
Fiji	–	–	–	2	–	**2**	1	–	**1**	**1**	**1**	**2**	–	1	3	3	2	Q
Kiribati	–	–	–	–	–	–	–	–	–	–		–	–	–	–	14	–	Q
Nauru	–	–	–	–	–	–	–	8	9	11	12	12	–	–	–	12	11	Q
New Caledonia	–	–	–	9	–	–	11	–	8	9	8	14	–	–	–	–	12	Q
New Zealand	–	–	–	–	–	–	2	–	–	2	2	7	–	2	**1**	1	–	Q
Niue	4	4	6	8	–	–	10	–	–	–	13	15	–	–	–	15	8	Q
Papua New Guinea	5	3	4	7	5	6	5	4	4	5	7	6	–	–	–	4	–	Q
Samoa	**1**	1	2	**1**	2	1	3	3	2	3*	3	4	–	–	–	2	1	Q
Solomon Islands	6	–	–	10	7	7	9	6	10	9	9	8	–	–	–	6	**9**	Q
Tahiti	8	**7**	7	–	8	–	12	–	–	–	–	–	–	–	–	–	14	Q
Tonga	2	2	3	3	3	–	6	2	5	7	5	5	–	–	4	5	3	Q
Tuvalu	–	–	–	–	–	8	–	–	–	13	11	11	–	–	–	11	4	Q
Vanuatu	7	6	8	–	–	–	–	–	–	11	10	13	–	–	–	10	10	Q
Invited teams
Japan	–	–	–	–	–	–	–	–	–	–	–	3	–	–	–	–	7	Q
Oceania Barbarians	–	–	–	–	–	–	–	–	–	–	–	–	–	4	–	9	–	–
Number of teams	8	6	8	10	8	8	12	8	10	13	13	15	–	4	4	15	14	

Notes:
* – an asterisk indicates a shared placing (e.g. 3* is equal third)

== Summary of tournaments ==
=== Results by year ===
The table below is a summary of the men's finals matches at the Oceania Sevens since 2008:

Year	Host city		Final		Third place match		
Year	Host city	Gold	Score	Silver	Bronze	Score	Fourth place
2008	(Samoa); Apia	Samoa	52–0	Tonga	Cook Islands	33–15	Niue
2009	(French Polynesia); Papeete	Samoa	31–14	Tonga	Papua New Guinea	24–12	Niue
2010	(Australia); Darwin	Australia	34–12	Samoa	Tonga	12–7	Papua New Guinea
2011	(Samoa); Apia	Samoa	19–11	Fiji	Tonga	28–12	Australia
2012	(Australia); Sydney	Australia	12–7	Samoa	Tonga	19–17	Cook Islands
2013	(Fiji); Suva	Samoa	31–17	Fiji	Australia	49–5	Cook Islands
2014	(Australia); Noosa	Fiji	21–5	New Zealand	Samoa	33–7	Australia
2015	(New Zealand); Auckland	Australia	50–0	Tonga	Samoa	54–0	Papua New Guinea
2016	(Fiji); Suva	Fiji	28–19	Samoa	Australia	25–0	Papua New Guinea
2017	(Fiji); Suva	Fiji	26–0	New Zealand	Australia	Shared third place	Samoa
2018	(Fiji); Suva	Fiji	17–12	New Zealand	Samoa	14–12	Australia
2019	(Fiji); Suva	Australia	22–7	Fiji	Japan	26–21	Samoa
2020		No tournament in 2020					
2021	(Australia); Townsville	Fiji	round robin	New Zealand	Australia	round robin	Oceania Barbarians
2022	(New Zealand); Pukekohe	New Zealand	round robin	Australia	Fiji	round robin	Tonga
2023	(Australia); Brisbane	New Zealand	24–19	Samoa	Fiji	36–7	Papua New Guinea
2024	(Solomon Islands); Honiara	Samoa	17–12	Fiji	Tonga	24–19	Tuvalu

=== Results by team ===
Updated after the 2023 edition:

Team	1st	2nd	3rd	4th	5th	6th	7th	8th	9th	Top-3 Apps	Top-6 Apps	Total Apps
Fiji	5	3	2	–	–	–	–	–	–	10	10	10
Samoa	4	4	4	1	–	–	–	–	–	12	13	13
Australia	4	1	4	3	–	–	1	–	–	9	12	13
New Zealand	2	4	–	–	–	–	1	–	–	6	6	7
Tonga	–	3	3	1	4	1	1	–	–	6	12	13
Papua New Guinea	–	–	1	4	4	2	2	–	–	1	11	13
Cook Islands	–	–	1	2	4	3	1	1	–	1	10	13
Japan ^{a}	–	–	1	–	–	–	–	–	–	1	1	1
Niue	–	–	–	2	–	1	–	1	–	–	3	8
Oceania Barbarians ^{a}	–	–	–	1	–	–	–	–	1	–	1	2
American Samoa	–	–	–	–	1	2	3	1	1	–	3	9
Solomon Islands	–	–	–	–	–	3	2	–	3	–	3	9
Vanuatu	–	–	–	–	–	1	1	1	–	–	1	7
Tahiti	–	–	–	–	–	–	2	2	–	–	–	5
New Caledonia	–	–	–	–	–	–	–	2	2	–	–	6
Nauru	–	–	–	–	–	–	–	1	1	–	–	6
Tuvalu	–	–	–	–	–	–	–	1	–	–	–	5
Kiribati	–	–	–	–	–	–	–	–	–	–	–	1

Notes:

^^{a} Invited team, not a member of Oceania Rugby.

== See also ==
- Oceania Women's Sevens Championship
