= Rugby union in Papua New Guinea =

- Country: Papua New Guinea
- Governing body: Papua New Guinea Rugby Football Union
- National team: Papua New Guinea
- Registered players: 8,520 (total)
- Clubs: 80

Papua New Guinea is a tier three rugby union playing nation. They began playing international rugby union in 1965 and have yet to make the Rugby World Cup. Teams from Papua New Guinea have competed in the Commonwealth Games.

Although Papua New Guinea has a rugby union tradition, rugby league is far more popular and is the national sport. Despite this, there are 8520 registered players of rugby union and 57 clubs.

The national side is ranked 83rd in the world (as of 27 June 2022).

== Governing body ==
The governing body is the Papua New Guinea Rugby Football Union.

== History ==
Rugby is long established in PNG, and tends to fall under the Australian sphere of influence. The game has been played as a folk sport in many regions, and the country's general lack of infrastructure has hindered its national development.

Due to its close relationship with Queensland in Australia, rugby league is very strong in the country.

Former Grand Slam Wallaby Brendan Moon lives on the island, and has been helping the development for a number of years.

As with many of the Pacific Nations, PNG has tended to do best at rugby sevens, and has a strong national sevens team.

== National team ==
The Papua New Guinea national rugby union team is nicknamed the "Puk-Puks", from the Tok Pisin word for "crocodiles". They have not qualified for a Rugby World Cup yet.

== See also ==
- Papua New Guinea national rugby sevens team
- Papua New Guinea national under-20 rugby union team
- Papua New Guinea Rugby Football Union
- Sport in Papua New Guinea
