= 2014 Oceania Sevens Championship =

- Host nation: Australia
- Date: 3–4 October 2014

Cup
- Champion: Fiji
- Runner-up: New Zealand
- Third: Samoa

Plate
- Winner: Papua New Guinea
- Runner-up: Tonga

Bowl
- Winner: Solomon Islands
- Runner-up: Niue

The 2014 Oceania Sevens Championship was the seventh Oceania Sevens in men's rugby sevens. It was held in Noosa, Australia.

Fiji won the Oceania Sevens Championship by defeating New Zealand 21-5. The two best-placed non-core Sevens World Series teams qualified through to the 2015 Wellington Sevens (Papua New Guinea) and the 2015 Hong Kong Sevens (Tonga).

== Pool Stage ==
Key to colours in group tables
Teams that advanced to the Cup Quarterfinal

=== Pool A ===
Team	Pld	W	D	L	PF	PA	PD	Pts
New Zealand	3	3	0	0	125	12	113	9
American Samoa	3	1	1	1	32	42	–10	6
Papua New Guinea	3	1	1	1	45	65	–20	6
Niue	3	0	0	3	22	105	–83	3

3 October 2014

American Samoa	12–12	Papua New Guinea

Dolphin Oval, Noosa

3 October 2014

New Zealand	57–7	Niue

Dolphin Oval, Noosa

3 October 2014

American Samoa	15–10	Niue

Dolphin Oval, Noosa

3 October 2014

New Zealand	48–0	Papua New Guinea

Dolphin Oval, Noosa

3 October 2014

Papua New Guinea	33–5	Niue

Dolphin Oval, Noosa

3 October 2014

New Zealand	20–5	American Samoa

Dolphin Oval, Noosa

=== Pool B ===
Team	Pld	W	D	L	PF	PA	PD	Pts
Fiji	3	3	0	0	134	0	+134	9
Cook Islands	3	2	0	1	47	44	+3	7
Solomon Islands	3	1	0	2	31	64	–33	5
Tahiti	3	0	0	3	12	116	–104	3

3 October 2014

Cook Islands	21–5	Solomon Islands

Dolphin Oval, Noosa

3 October 2014

Fiji	64–0	Tahiti

Dolphin Oval, Noosa

3 October 2014

Cook Islands	26–5	Tahiti

Dolphin Oval, Noosa

3 October 2014

Fiji	36–0	Solomon Islands

Dolphin Oval, Noosa

3 October 2014

Solomon Islands	26–7	Tahiti

Dolphin Oval, Noosa

3 October 2014

Fiji	34–0	Cook Islands

Dolphin Oval, Noosa

=== Pool C ===
Team	Pld	W	D	L	PF	PA	PD	Pts
Australia	3	3	0	0	87	19	+68	9
Samoa	3	2	0	1	81	40	+41	7
Tonga	3	1	0	2	31	62	-31	5
New Caledonia	3	0	0	3	26	104	-78	3

3 October 2014

Australia	21–0	Tonga

Dolphin Oval, Noosa

3 October 2014

Samoa	40–7	New Caledonia

Dolphin Oval, Noosa

3 October 2014

Australia	40–7	New Caledonia

Dolphin Oval, Noosa

3 October 2014

Samoa	29–7	Tonga

Dolphin Oval, Noosa

3 October 2014

Tonga	24–12	New Caledonia

Dolphin Oval, Noosa

3 October 2014

Samoa	12–26	Australia

Dolphin Oval, Noosa

== Knockout stage ==
=== Bowl ===
9th–12th semi-finals
4 October 2014 – Dolphin Oval, Noosa
Solomon Islands	14
Tahiti	12
4 October 2014 – Dolphin Oval, Noosa
New Caledonia	10
Niue	38

9th–10th play-off
4 October 2014 – Dolphin Oval, Noosa
Solomon Islands	19
Niue	14
11th–12th play-off
4 October 2014 – Dolphin Oval, Noosa
Tahiti	10
New Caledonia	31

=== Plate ===
5th–8th semi-finals
4 October 2014 – Dolphin Oval, Noosa
Tonga	29
Cook Islands	5
4 October 2014 – Dolphin Oval, Noosa
American Samoa	10
Papua New Guinea	27

5th–6th play-off
4 October 2014 – Dolphin Oval, Noosa
Tonga	17
Papua New Guinea	26
7th–8th play-off
4 October 2014 – Dolphin Oval, Noosa
Cook Islands	36
American Samoa	19

=== Cup ===
Quarter-finals
4 October 2014 – Dolphin Oval, Noosa
Fiji	49
Tonga	7
4 October 2014 – Dolphin Oval, Noosa
Samoa	31
Cook Islands	7
4 October 2014 – Dolphin Oval, Noosa
Australia	59
American Samoa	0
4 October 2014 – Dolphin Oval, Noosa
Papua New Guinea	0
New Zealand	54

Semi-finals
4 October 2014 – Dolphin Oval, Noosa
Fiji	24
Samoa	12
4 October 2014 – Dolphin Oval, Noosa
Australia	14
New Zealand	19

Final
4 October 2014 – Dolphin Oval, Noosa
Fiji	21
New Zealand	5
Third place
4 October 2014 – Dolphin Oval, Noosa
Samoa	33
Australia	7

== Final standings ==
Legend
A core team in the 2014–15 Sevens World Series
Qualified to play in 2015 Wellington Sevens and 2015 Hong Kong Sevens
Qualified to play in 2015 Hong Kong Sevens

Rank	Team
1st place, gold medalist(s)	Fiji
2nd place, silver medalist(s)	New Zealand
3rd place, bronze medalist(s)	Samoa
4	Australia
5	Papua New Guinea
6	Tonga
7	Cook Islands
8	American Samoa
9	Solomon Islands
10	Niue
11	New Caledonia
12	Tahiti
