= 2023 Oceania Sevens Championship =

Men's rugby sevens tournament in Australia

- Host nation: Australia
- Date: 10–12 November 2023

Cup
- Champion: New Zealand
- Runner-up: Samoa
- Third: Fiji

Tournament details
- Matches played: 39

The 2023 Oceania Sevens Championship was the fifteenth Oceania Sevens tournament in men's rugby sevens. It also served as the regional qualifier for the 2024 Paris Olympic Sevens and was held at Ballymore Stadium in Brisbane, Australia from 10 to 12 November.

== Teams ==
Fourteen national teams were scheduled to compete at the 2023 tournament, plus an Oceania invitational team:

- American Samoa
- Australia
- Cook Islands
- Fiji
- Kiribati
- Nauru
- New Zealand
- Niue
- Oceania Barbarians
- Papua New Guinea
- Samoa
- Solomon Islands
- Tonga
- Tuvalu
- Vanuatu

== Format ==
Teams were seeded into three pools of five.

To allow a clear run for countries competing for qualification to the 2024 Summer Olympic Sevens, the three Oceania nations already qualified (Australia, Fiji and New Zealand) were placed in Pool A together with, Niue (not Olympic eligible) and the Oceania invitational team (Barbarians). The remaining teams were seeded into Pool B and Pool C for Olympic qualification.

A playoff between the winners of Pool B and Pool C decided the Olympic qualifying berth.

== Pool stage ==
=== Pool A (Championship) ===
Pos	Team	P	W	D	L	PF	PA	PD	Pts	Qualification
1	Fiji	4	4	0	0	118	44	+74	12	Advance to finals
2	New Zealand	4	3	0	1	131	22	+109	10	Advance to finals
3	Australia	4	2	0	2	103	47	+56	8	Middle classification
4	Oceania Barbarians	4	1	0	3	59	123	–64	6	Lower classification
5	Niue	4	0	0	4	22	197	–175	4	Fifteenth place

10 November
14:56

Fiji	47–5	Niue

Ballymore Stadium, Brisbane

10 November
15:18

New Zealand	56–0	Oceania Barbarians

Ballymore Stadium, Brisbane

10 November
18:58

Australia	24–0	Oceania Barbarians

Ballymore Stadium, Brisbane

10 November
19:42

New Zealand	5–12	Fiji

Ballymore Stadium, Brisbane

11 November
13:12

Fiji	31–12	Oceania Barbarians

Ballymore Stadium, Brisbane

11 November
13:34

Australia	47–5	Niue

Ballymore Stadium, Brisbane

11 November
16:30

New Zealand	56–0	Niue

Ballymore Stadium, Brisbane

11 November
16:52

Fiji	28–22	Australia

Ballymore Stadium, Brisbane

11 November
18:42

Niue	12–47	Oceania Barbarians

Ballymore Stadium, Brisbane

11 November
19:26

New Zealand	14–10	Australia

Ballymore Stadium, Brisbane

=== Pool B (Olympic) ===
Pos	Team	P	W	D	L	PF	PA	PD	Pts	Qualification
1	Samoa	4	4	0	0	184	0	+184	12	Advance to finals and Olympic qualifier
2	Solomon Islands	4	3	0	1	105	74	+31	10	Fifth place match
3	Cook Islands	4	2	0	2	62	75	–13	8	Middle classification
4	Tuvalu	4	1	0	3	48	96	–48	6	Middle classification
5	American Samoa	4	0	0	4	12	166	–154	4	Lower classification

10 November
14:12

Solomon Islands	50–5	American Samoa

Ballymore Stadium, Brisbane

10 November
14:34

Samoa	36–0	Tuvalu

Ballymore Stadium, Brisbane

10 November
18:14

Cook Islands	17–10	Tuvalu

Ballymore Stadium, Brisbane

10 November
18:36

Samoa	50–0	Solomon Islands

Ballymore Stadium, Brisbane

11 November
12:28

Solomon Islands	36–5	Tuvalu

Ballymore Stadium, Brisbane

11 November
12:50

Cook Islands	31–0	American Samoa

Ballymore Stadium, Brisbane

11 November
15:24

Solomon Islands	19–14	Cook Islands

Ballymore Stadium, Brisbane

11 November
15:46

Samoa	52–0	American Samoa

Ballymore Stadium, Brisbane

11 November
17:58

American Samoa	7–33	Tuvalu

Ballymore Stadium, Brisbane

11 November
18:20

Samoa	46–0	Cook Islands

Ballymore Stadium, Brisbane

=== Pool C (Olympic) ===
Pos	Team	P	W	D	L	PF	PA	PD	Pts	Qualification
1	Papua New Guinea	4	4	0	0	156	33	+123	12	Advance to finals and Olympic qualifier
2	Tonga	4	3	0	1	214	36	+178	10	Fifth place match
3	Vanuatu	4	2	0	2	43	136	–93	8	Middle classification
4	Nauru	4	1	0	3	43	109	–66	6	Middle classification
5	Kiribati	4	0	0	4	20	162	–142	4	Lower classification

10 November
13:28

Papua New Guinea	46–0	Kiribati

Ballymore Stadium, Brisbane

10 November
13:50

Tonga	59–7	Nauru

Ballymore Stadium, Brisbane

10 November
17:30

Vanuatu	19–5	Nauru

Ballymore Stadium, Brisbane

10 November
17:52

Tonga	21–24	Papua New Guinea

Ballymore Stadium, Brisbane

11 November
11:44

Papua New Guinea	31–5	Nauru

Ballymore Stadium, Brisbane

11 November
12:06

Vanuatu	17–15	Kiribati

Ballymore Stadium, Brisbane

11 November
14:40

Papua New Guinea	55–7	Vanuatu

Ballymore Stadium, Brisbane

11 November
15:02

Tonga	73–5	Kiribati

Ballymore Stadium, Brisbane

11 November
17:14

Kiribati	0–26	Nauru

Ballymore Stadium, Brisbane

11 November
17:36

Tonga	61–0	Vanuatu

Ballymore Stadium, Brisbane

== Classification ==
=== Thirteenth place match ===
12 November
13:28

Kiribati	5–12	American Samoa

Ballymore Stadium, Brisbane

=== Eleventh place match ===
12 November
13:50

Tuvalu	10–5	Nauru

Ballymore Stadium, Brisbane

=== Ninth place match ===
12 November
14:12

Oceania Barbarians	34–10	Vanuatu

Ballymore Stadium, Brisbane

=== Seventh place match ===
12 November
14:34

Australia	48–0	Cook Islands

Ballymore Stadium, Brisbane

=== Fifth place match ===
12 November
14:56

Solomon Islands	5–22	Tonga

Ballymore Stadium, Brisbane

== Finals ==
Semi-final

Championship final

12 November 2023 – 15:18 – Ballymore Stadium

A1
Fiji
17

12 November 2023 – 20:00 – Ballymore Stadium
New Zealand	24
Samoa	19

A2
New Zealand
24

12 November 2023 – 15:40 – Ballymore Stadium

B1
Samoa
24

Third place

C1
Papua New Guinea
0

12 November 2023 – 19:08 – Ballymore Stadium

Fiji
36

Papua New Guinea
7

=== Semi-finals ===
12 November
15:18

Fiji	17–24	New Zealand

Ballymore Stadium, Brisbane

Olympic qualifying match

12 November
15:40

Samoa	24–0	Papua New Guinea

Ballymore Stadium, Brisbane

=== Third place match ===
12 November
19:08

Fiji	36–7	Papua New Guinea

Ballymore Stadium, Brisbane

=== Championship final match ===
12 November
20:00

New Zealand	24–19	Samoa

Ballymore Stadium, Brisbane

== Ranking ==
Place	Team	Qualification
1st place, gold medalist(s)	New Zealand	Already qualified for 2024 Olympics
2nd place, silver medalist(s)	Samoa	Qualified for 2024 Olympics
3rd place, bronze medalist(s)	Fiji	Already qualified for 2024 Olympics
4	Papua New Guinea	Qualified for Olympic Repechage
5	Tonga	Qualified for Olympic Repechage
6	Solomon Islands	
7	Australia	Already qualified for 2024 Olympics
8	Cook Islands	
9	Oceania Barbarians	Not eligible for 2024 Olympics
10	Vanuatu	
11	Tuvalu	
12	Nauru	
13	American Samoa	
14	Kiribati	
15	Niue	Not eligible for 2024 Olympics

== See also ==
- 2023 Oceania Women's Sevens Championship
