= 2018 Oceania Sevens Championship =

Rugby sevens tournament

- Host nation: Fiji
- Date: 9–10 November

Cup
- Champion: Fiji
- Runner-up: New Zealand
- Third: Samoa

Tournament details
- Matches played: 31

The 2018 Oceania Sevens Championship was the eleventh Oceania Sevens in men's rugby sevens. It was held at ANZ Stadium in Suva, Fiji on 9–10 November. Host nation Fiji won the tournament, defeating New Zealand by 17–12 in the final.

Tonga finished fifth and, as the highest-placed side without core status on the World Rugby Sevens Series, won berths to the Sydney Sevens and Hamilton Sevens for 2019. Tonga also joined the sixth-placed Cook Islands as Oceania's representatives for the 2019 Hong Kong Sevens qualifying tournament for the 2020 World Series.

== Teams ==
Participating nations for the 2018 tournament was almost the same as the previous year with Niue replacing American Samoa in the teams being entered:

- Australia
- Cook Islands
- Fiji
- Nauru
- New Caledonia
- Niue
- New Zealand
- Papua New Guinea
- Samoa
- Solomon Islands
- Tonga
- Tuvalu
- Vanuatu

== Pool stage ==
The draw for the pool stage was done by a random order with the top four seeds being set as the top team in each of the four pools with the remaining spots in the draw being done by bands (5-8th, 9-12th).

Key to colours in group tables
Teams that advanced to the Championship quarter-finals
Teams that advanced to the 9th-12th ranking semi-final
Eliminated

=== Pool A ===
Teams	Pld	W	D	L	PF	PA	+/−	Pts
Fiji	2	2	0	0	82	0	+82	6
Papua New Guinea	2	1	0	1	37	35	+2	4
Solomon Islands	2	0	0	2	0	0	−84	2

9 November 2018
13:48

Papua New Guinea	14–14	Solomon Islands

9 November 2018
16:57

Fiji	47–0	Solomon Islands

9 November 2018
20:06

Fiji	35–0	Papua New Guinea

=== Pool B ===
Teams	Pld	W	D	L	PF	PA	+/−	Pts
New Zealand	2	2	0	0	109	0	+109	6
New Caledonia	2	1	0	1	41	61	−20	4
Nauru	2	0	0	2	14	103	−89	2

9 November 2018
13:27

New Caledonia	41–14	Nauru

9 November 2018
16:36

New Zealand	62–0	Nauru

9 November 2018
19:45

New Zealand	47–0	New Caledonia

=== Pool C ===
Teams	Pld	W	D	L	PF	PA	+/−	Pts
Australia	2	2	0	0	77	0	+77	6
Cook Islands	2	1	0	1	24	32	−8	4
Vanuatu	2	0	0	2	5	74	−69	2

9 November 2018
13:36

Cook Islands	24–5	Vanuatu

9 November 2018
16:15

Australia	50–0	Vanuatu

9 November 2018
19:24

Australia	27–0	Cook Islands

=== Pool D ===
Teams	Pld	W	D	L	PF	PA	+/−	Pts
Samoa	3	3	0	0	128	0	+128	9
Tonga	3	2	0	1	83	28	+55	7
Tuvalu	3	1	0	2	30	107	−77	5
Niue	3	0	0	3	19	125	−106	3

9 November 2018
12:24

Tonga	38–0	Niue

9 November 2018
12:45

Samoa	43–0	Tuvalu

9 November 2018
15:33

Tonga	45–7	Tuvalu

9 November 2018
15:54

Samoa	64–0	Niue

9 November 2018
18:42

Tuvalu	23–19	Niue

9 November 2018
19:03

Samoa	21–0	Tonga

== Knockout stage ==
9th-12th Place

Semi-finals
10 November 2018 – 12:24
Nauru	14
Vanuatu	28
10 November 2018 – 12:45
Solomon Islands	40
Tuvalu	5

Ninth Place
10 November 2018 - 17:10
Vanuatu	7
Solomon Islands	29
Eleventh Place
10 November 2018 - 16:49
Nauru	24
Tuvalu	29

5th-8th Place

Quarter-finals
10 November 2018 – 11:00
Australia	19
Tonga	7
10 November 2018 – 11:21
New Zealand	47
Papua New Guinea	0
10 November 2018 – 11:42
Samoa	19
Cook Islands	12
10 November 2018 – 12:03
Fiji	38
New Caledonia	0

Semi-finals
10 November 2018 – 14:30
Tonga	17
Papua New Guinea	5
10 November 2018 – 14:51
Cook Islands	19
New Caledonia	14

Fifth Place
10 November 2018 - 18:34
Tonga	29
Cook Islands	12
Seventh Place
10 November 2018 - 17:52
Papua New Guinea	28
New Caledonia	12

Championship

Quarter-finals
10 November 2018 – 11:00
Australia	19
Tonga	7
10 November 2018 – 11:21
New Zealand	47
Papua New Guinea	0
10 November 2018 – 11:42
Samoa	19
Cook Islands	12
10 November 2018 – 12:03
Fiji	38
New Caledonia	0

Semi-finals
11 November 2018 – 15:12
Australia	5
New Zealand	14
11 November 2018 – 15:33
Samoa	7
Fiji	36

Final
11 November 2018 - 20:03
New Zealand	12
Fiji	17
Third place
11 November 2018 - 19:16
Australia	12
Samoa	14

== Placings ==
Place	Team
1st place, gold medalist(s)	Fiji
2nd place, silver medalist(s)	New Zealand
3rd place, bronze medalist(s)	Samoa
4	Australia
5	Tonga
6	Cook Islands
7	Papua New Guinea

Place	Team
8	New Caledonia
9	Solomon Islands
10	Vanuatu
11	Tuvalu
12	Nauru
13	Niue

Source: World Rugby

Legend
Green fill	Qualified to the 2019 Sydney Sevens and 2019 Hamilton Sevens tournaments
Dark bar	Gained entry to the 2019 Hong Kong Sevens qualifying tournament for the 2020 World Rugby Sevens Series
Light bar	Already a core team in World Rugby Sevens Series
