= Solomon Islands national rugby sevens team =

Solomon Islands
- Union: Solomon Islands Rugby Union Federation
- Coach: Chris Nay
- Captain: Bobby Namson Sade
Team kit

World Cup Sevens
- Appearances: 0

Solomon Islands national rugby sevens team is a national sporting side that represents the Solomon Islands in rugby sevens. They participate in the Pacific Games and regional tournaments.

== History ==
The Solomon Islands finished in seventh place in the 2011 Pacific Games defeating Tokelau 33–7.

They competed at the 2023 Oceania Sevens Championship in Brisbane, they ranked sixth overall after their defeat to Tonga in the fifth place playoff.

At the 2023 Pacific Games in Honiara, the Solomon Islands won their opening pool games against Tahiti, and Wallis and Futuna. They were later thrashed by Fiji and knocked out off the Championship quarterfinals.

== Players ==
Squad to the 2023 Pacific Games:

Players
Douglas Aluna
Gabriel William Kaitu'u
Dedan Atai Puia
Matthew Bernhardt Qwaina
Bobby Namson Sade
Samani Sade
Carling Tuhanuku Saomatangi
Daniel Tuhanuku Saomatangi
Moses Moetai Singamoana
JC Saueha Tengemoana
Jordie Tepuke
Gahan Tu'ata

=== Previous Squads ===
2015 Pacific Games Squad
Jonathan Maitaki Kaitu'u • Steven Momoa • Leslie Ngiumoana • John Bakila • Jonny Tapuika Maui • Solly Giungata's Seuika
Frank Tautai Paikea • Ephrem Baptiste Kelesi • Roger Tepai • Roman Pautangata Tongata • Viv Frank Kelesi • Sakus Maelasi

2011 Pacific Games Squad

Robert Ludae • Roman Tongaka • Jeffery Ma'Ungatu'u • Stewart Ba'Iabe (c) • Eugene Taimagino • Leslie Ngiumoana Puia (vc)
Cameron Suamoana • Steve Tepuke Moana • Felix Galo Solomon • Jonathan Maitaki Kaitu'u • Vivi Frank Kelesi • Baptist Ephrem Kelesi

2014 Oceania Sevens Championship Squad
Leslie Ngiumoana Puia (c) • Baptiste Kelesi (vc) • Jeffery Ma'Ungatu'u • Roger Tepai • Moses Moetai • Solly Sangikimua
Shane Angikimua • John Bakila • Felix Galo Solomon • Jonathan Maitaki Kaitu'u • Frank Paikea • Sakus Maelasi

== Tournament History ==
=== Pacific Games ===
Pacific Games
Year	Round	Position	Pld	W	D	L
(Guam) 1999	Bronze Final	4th	6	3	0	3
(Fiji) 2003	Did Not Compete					
(Samoa) 2007	Bronze Final	4th	6	3	0	3
(New Caledonia) 2011	7th Place Playoff	7th	6	3	0	3
(Papua New Guinea) 2015	5th Place Playoff	6th	7	3	0	4
(Samoa) 2019	5th Place Playoff	5th	4	2	0	2
(Solomon Islands) 2023	5th Place Playoff	6th	6	3	0	3
Total	0 Titles	6/7	35	17	0	18

=== Oceania Sevens ===
Oceania Sevens
Year	Round	Position	Pld	W	D	L
(Samoa) 2008	Plate Final	6th	5	1	0	4
(French Polynesia) 2009	Did Not Compete					
(Australia) 2010	Did Not Compete					
(Samoa) 2011	Bowl Final	10th	5	0	0	5
(Australia) 2012	Plate Final	7th	6	1	0	5
(Fiji) 2013	Plate Final	7th	6	1	0	5
(Australia) 2014	Bowl Final	9th	5	3	0	2
(New Zealand) 2015	Plate Final	6th	6	2	0	4
(Fiji) 2016	9th Place Playoff	10th	5	0	0	5
(Fiji) 2017	9th Place Playoff	9th (Note: Due to adverse weather conditions affecting the schedule of games, all classification finals except the fifth-place playoff and Championship Final were cancelled. The fifth-place match was played because of qualification implications.)	3	1	0	2
(Fiji) 2018	9th Place Playoff	9th	4	2	0	2
(Fiji) 2019	7th Place Playoff	8th	6	3	0	3
(Australia) 2021	Did Not Compete					
(New Zealand) 2022	Challenge Semifinal	3rd (Note: Game was abandoned)	5	3	0	2
(Australia) 2023	5th Place Playoff	6th	4	3	0	1
Total	0 Titles	12/15	60	20	0	40
