= 2012 Oceania Sevens Championship =

- Host nation: Australia
- Date: 25–26 August 2012

Cup
- Champion: Australia
- Runner-up: Samoa
- Third: Tonga

Plate
- Winner: Papua New Guinea
- Runner-up: American Samoa

The 2012 Oceania Sevens Championship was the fifth Oceania Sevens in men's rugby sevens. It was held at North Sydney Oval in Sydney, Australia. The winner qualified through to the 2013 Rugby World Cup Sevens tournament in Moscow.

Australia won the Oceania Sevens Championship by defeating Samoa 12-7.

== Pool Stage ==
Key to colours in group tables
Teams that advanced to the Cup Quarterfinal

=== Pool A ===
Team	Pld	W	D	L	PF	PA	PD	Pts
Samoa	3	3	0	0				9
Papua New Guinea	3	2	0	1				7
Cook Islands	3	1	0	2				5
Tahiti	3	0	0	3				3

25 August 2012

Papua New Guinea	24–12	Cook Islands

North Sydney Oval

25 August 2012

Samoa	47–0	Tahiti

North Sydney Oval

25 August 2012

Papua New Guinea	64–0	Tahiti

North Sydney Oval

25 August 2012

Samoa	26–24	Cook Islands

North Sydney Oval

25 August 2012

Cook Islands	66–0	Tahiti

North Sydney Oval

25 August 2012

Samoa	46–12	Papua New Guinea

North Sydney Oval

=== Pool B ===
Team	Pld	W	D	L	PF	PA	PD	Pts
Australia	3	3	0	0				9
American Samoa	3	2	0	1				7
Tonga	3	1	0	2				5
Solomon Islands	3	0	0	3				3

25 August 2012

Tonga	7–14	American Samoa

North Sydney Oval

25 August 2012

Australia	47–0	Solomon Islands

North Sydney Oval

25 August 2012

Tonga	33–7	Solomon Islands

North Sydney Oval

25 August 2012

Australia	22–7	American Samoa

North Sydney Oval

25 August 2012

American Samoa	34–12	Solomon Islands

North Sydney Oval

25 August 2012

Australia	45–0	Tonga

North Sydney Oval

== Knockout stage ==
=== Plate ===
5th–8th semi-finals
26 August 2012 - North Sydney Oval
Solomon Islands	7
American Samoa	24
26 August 2012 - North Sydney Oval
Papua New Guinea	47
Tahiti	0

5th–6th play-off
26 August 2012 - North Sydney Oval
Papua New Guinea	24
American Samoa	21
7th–8th play-off
26 August 2012 - North Sydney Oval
Solomon Islands	42
Tahiti	0

=== Cup ===
Quarter-finals
26 August 2012 - North Sydney Oval
Samoa	62
Solomon Islands	0
26 August 2012 - North Sydney Oval
Cook Islands	19
American Samoa	0
26 August 2012 - North Sydney Oval
Papua New Guinea	15
Tonga	17
26 August 2012 - North Sydney Oval
Tahiti	0
Australia	55

Semi-finals
26 August 2012 - North Sydney Oval
Samoa	52
Cook Islands	5
26 August 2012 - North Sydney Oval
Tonga	7
Australia	24

Final
26 August 2012 - North Sydney Oval
Samoa	7
Australia	12
Third place
26 August 2012 - North Sydney Oval
Cook Islands	17
Tonga	19
