= 2009 Oceania Sevens Championship =

- Host nation: Tahiti
- Date: 12-14 November

Cup
- Champion: Samoa
- Runner-up: Tonga
- Third: Papua New Guinea

Tournament details
- Matches played: 27

The 2009 Oceania Sevens Championship was the second edition of the Oceania Sevens. It was held in Papeete, Tahiti from 12 to 14 November. Samoa were the eventual winner.

== Tournament ==
Key to colours in group tables
Teams that progressed to the Cup Semi-finals
Teams that progressed to the Plate Semi-finals

=== Group phase ===
Team	Pld	W	D	L	PF	PA	+/-	Pts
Samoa	6	5	0	1	199	40	159	16
Tonga	6	5	0	1	140	57	83	16
Niue	6	5	0	1	112	43	69	16
Papua New Guinea	6	3	0	3	112	65	47	12
Cook Islands	6	2	0	4	112	94	18	10
Vanuatu	6	1	0	5	55	205	-150	8
Tahiti	6	0	0	6	19	245	-226	6

12 November

Tonga	12 - 7	Papua New Guinea

12 November

Vanuatu	29 - 5	Tahiti

13 November

Tonga	14 - 5	Niue

13 November

Niue	7 - 5	Samoa

13 November

Papua New Guinea	24 - 0	Vanuatu

13 November

Samoa	33 - 7	Cook Islands

13 November

Cook Islands	41 - 0	Tahiti

13 November

Niue	22 - 0	Papua New Guinea

13 November

Tonga	31 - 0	Tahiti

13 November

Samoa	50 - 0	Vanuatu

13 November

Niue	7 - 5	Cook Islands

13 November

Samoa	24 - 19	Papua New Guinea

13 November

Papua New Guinea	43 - 0	Tahiti

13 November

Tonga	21 - 19	Cook Islands

13 November

Niue	33 - 14	Tahiti

13 November

Niue	38 - 5	Vanuatu

13 November

Samoa	19 - 7	Tonga

13 November

Cook Islands	33 - 14	Vanuatu

13 November

Samoa	68 - 0	Tahiti

13 November

Tonga	55 - 7	Vanuatu

13 November

Papua New Guinea	19 - 7	Cook Islands

=== Finals ===
Plate

Semi-final			Plate Final
			1	Cook Islands	43
2	Vanuatu	33		Vanuatu	14
3	Tahiti	10

Cup

Semi-finals
14 November
Samoa	29
Papua New Guinea	0
14 November
Tonga	29
Niue	14

Cup Final
14 November
Samoa	31
Tonga	14
3rd Place
14 November
Papua New Guinea	24
Niue	12
