= Rugby sevens at the 2003 South Pacific Games =

Rugby union at the 2003 South Pacific Games
- Venue: Suva, Fiji
- Dates: September
- Nations: 11

Rugby sevens at the 2003 Pacific Games was played as a tournament for 11 men's teams from 3–5 July 2003 at Suva in Fiji. The Fijian team won the final, defeating Cook Islands by 43–10 to claim the gold medal.

== Medal summary ==
Event	Gold	Silver	Bronze
Men's rugby 7s	Fiji	Cook Islands	Samoa

== Participants ==
There were 11 teams for the 2003 tournament:

- Cook Islands
- Fiji
- Guam
- New Caledonia
- Niue
- Papua New Guinea
- Samoa
- Tahiti
- Tonga
- Vanuatu
- Wallis and Futuna

== Format ==
The eleven teams were drawn into three pools and the first stage was played as a round robin within each group. The top two teams from the each pool and the best two third-placed teams advanced to the knockout stage.

Quarterfinals and semifinals in the knockout stage were followed by the third place play-off for the Bronze Medal, and the final for the Gold Medal.

== Preliminary round ==
=== Group A ===
Teams	Pld	W	D	L	PF	PA	+/−
Papua New Guinea	2	2	0	0	74	5	+69
Tahiti	2	1	0	1	38	27	+11
Guam	2	0	0	2	5	85	−80

Group A matches:

Tahiti	33–5	Guam

Papua New Guinea	22–5	Tahiti

Papua New Guinea	52–0	Guam

=== Group B ===
Teams	Pld	W	D	L	PF	PA	+/−
Samoa	3	3	0	0	124	7	+117
Niue	3	2	0	1	38	29	+9
Vanuatu	3	1	0	2	15	60	−45
New Caledonia	3	0	0	3	10	91	−81

Group B matches:

Samoa	52–0	New Caledonia

Niue	7–0	Vanuatu

Niue	24–0	New Caledonia

Samoa	43–0	Vanuatu

Samoa	29–7	Niue

Vanuatu	15–10	New Caledonia

=== Group C ===
Teams	Pld	W	D	L	PF	PA	+/−
Fiji	3	3	0	0	145	0	+145
Cook Islands	3	2	0	1	83	45	+38
Tonga	3	1	0	2	94	64	+30
Wallis and Futuna	3	0	0	3	0	213	−213

Group C matches:

Cook Islands	64–0	Wallis and Futuna

Fiji	45–0	Tonga

Tonga	82–0	Wallis and Futuna

Fiji	33–0	Cook Islands

Cook Islands	19–12	Tonga

Fiji	63–0	Wallis and Futuna

== Knockout stage ==
=== Championship bracket ===
Quarter-finals
5 July
Fiji	50
Vanuatu	5
5 July
Papua New Guinea	14
Tonga	19
5 July
Cook Islands	36
Niue	0
5 July
Tahiti	0
Samoa	21

Semi-finals
5 July
Fiji	36
Tonga	0
5 July
Cook Islands	14
Samoa	12

Final
5 July
Fiji	43
Cook Islands	10
Third place
5 July
Tonga	0
Samoa	50

=== Play-offs for 5th to 8th ===
Semi-finals
Papua New Guinea	36
Vanuatu	5
Niue	17
Tahiti	14

Final
Papua New Guinea	33
Niue	12
7th Place
Vanuatu	0
Tahiti	0

=== Play-offs for 9th to 11th ===
Teams	Pld	W	D	L	PF	PA	+/−
New Caledonia	2	2	0	0	46	12	+34
Guam	2	1	0	1	24	40	–16
Wallis and Futuna	2	0	0	2	21	39	–18

New Caledonia	26–5	Guam

New Caledonia	20–7	Wallis and Futuna

Guam	19–14	Wallis and Futuna

==== 9th Place Play-off ====
New Caledonia	40–17	Guam

== See also ==
- Rugby sevens at the Pacific Games
- Pacific Games
