= 2010 Oceania Sevens Championship =

- Host nation: Australia
- Date: 1–2 October 2010

Cup
- Champion: Australia
- Runner-up: Samoa
- Third: Tonga

Plate
- Winner: Cook Islands
- Runner-up: Niue

The 2010 Oceania Sevens Championship was the third Oceania Sevens in men's rugby sevens. It was held at Larrakia Park (also known as Austar Rugby Park) in Darwin, Northern Territory, Australia.

Australia won the Oceania Sevens Championship by defeating Samoa 34 to 12. Tonga, PNG and the Cook Islands, as the three highest finishers excluding core teams Australia and Samoa, qualified for the Wellington and Adelaide legs of the 2010–11 IRB Sevens World Series. Tonga also qualified for the 2011 Hong Kong Sevens.

== Pool Stage ==
Key to colours in group tables
Teams that advanced to the Cup Quarterfinal

=== Pool A ===
Team	Pld	W	D	L	PF	PA	PD	Pts
Samoa	3	3	0	0	105	12	+93	9
Papua New Guinea	3	2	0	1	74	34	+40	7
Niue	3	1	0	2	53	58	-5	5
Tahiti	3	0	0	3	0	128	-128	3

1 October 2010

Samoa	24–7	Papua New Guinea

Larrakia Park

1 October 2010

Niue	38–0	Tahiti

Larrakia Park

1 October 2010

Papua New Guinea	27–10	Niue

Larrakia Park

1 October 2010

Samoa	50–0	Tahiti

Larrakia Park

1 October 2010

Samoa	31–5	Niue

Larrakia Park

1 October 2010

Papua New Guinea	38–0	Tahiti

Larrakia Park

=== Pool B ===
Team	Pld	W	D	L	PF	PA	PD	Pts
Australia	3	3	0	0	97	19	+78	9
Tonga	3	2	0	1	86	35	+51	7
Cook Islands	3	1	0	2	42	51	-9	5
Vanuatu	3	0	0	3	10	130	-120	3

1 October 2010

Australia	21–12	Tonga

Larrakia Park

1 October 2010

Cook Islands	21–10	Vanuatu

Larrakia Park

1 October 2010

Tonga	22–14	Cook Islands

Larrakia Park

1 October 2010

Australia	57–0	Vanuatu

Larrakia Park

1 October 2010

Australia	19–7	Cook Islands

Larrakia Park

1 October 2010

Tonga	52–0	Vanuatu

Larrakia Park

== Knockout stage ==
=== Plate ===
5th–8th semi-finals
2 October 2010 - Larrakia Park, Darwin
Vanuatu	7
Cook Islands	33
2 October 2010 - Larrakia Park, Darwin
Niue	26
Tahiti	5

5th–6th play-off
2 October 2010 - Larrakia Park, Darwin
Cook Islands	15
Niue	5
7th–8th play-off
2 October 2010 - Larrakia Park, Darwin
Vanuatu	7
Tahiti	19

=== Cup ===
Quarter-finals
2 October 2010 - Larrakia Park
Samoa	55
Vanuatu	7
2 October 2010 - Larrakia Park
Papua New Guinea	21
Cook Islands	17
2 October 2010 - Larrakia Park
Tonga	24
Niue	0
2 October 2010 - Larrakia Park
Tahiti	0
Australia	51

Semi-finals
2 October 2010 - Larrakia Park
Samoa	17
Papua New Guinea	10
2 October 2010 - Larrakia Park
Tonga	5
Australia	24

Final
2 October 2010 - Larrakia Park
Samoa	12
Australia	34
Third place
2 October 2010 - Larrakia Park
Papua New Guinea	7
Tonga	12
