= 2016 Oceania Sevens Championship =

- Host nation: Fiji
- Date: 11–12 November

Cup
- Champion: Fiji
- Runner-up: Samoa
- Third: Australia

The 2016 Oceania Sevens Championship was the ninth Oceania Sevens in men's rugby sevens. It was held at ANZ Stadium in Suva, Fiji. The host nation Fiji won the tournament, defeating Samoa 28–19 in the final. Papua New Guinea and Tonga, as the two highest finishers not already core teams in the Sevens World Series, won qualification to the 2017 Hong Kong Sevens for a chance to earn core team status for the 2018 season.

== Teams ==
Participating nations for the 2016 tournament are:

- American Samoa
- Australia
- Cook Islands
- Fiji
- Nauru
- New Caledonia
- Papua New Guinea
- Samoa
- Solomon Islands
- Tonga

== Pool Stage ==
All times are Fiji Summer Time (UTC+13)

Key to colours in group tables
Teams that advance to the Championship semi-final
Teams that advance to the 5th-8th ranking semi-final
Teams that advance to 9th-10th ranking playoff

=== Pool A ===
Teams	Pld	W	D	L	PF	PA	+/−	Pts
Fiji	4	4	0	0	198	31	+167	12
Papua New Guinea	4	3	0	1	114	60	+54	10
Tonga	4	2	0	2	101	82	+19	8
American Samoa	4	1	0	3	38	150	-112	6
Nauru	4	0	0	4	25	153	-128	4

11 November 2016
11:45

Papua New Guinea	29-5	Nauru

11 November 2016
12:06

Fiji	52-0	American Samoa

11 November 2016
14:12

Fiji	31-12	Papua New Guinea

11 November 2016
14:33

Tonga	38-7	American Samoa

11 November 2016
16:39

Fiji	73-0	Nauru

11 November 2016
17:00

Tonga	10-28	Papua New Guinea

11 November 2016
19:06

American Samoa	17-15	Nauru

11 November 2016
19:27

Fiji	42-19	Tonga

12 November 2016
11:21

Papua New Guinea	45-15	American Samoa

12 November 2016
12:03

Tonga	34-5	Nauru

=== Pool B ===
Teams	Pld	W	D	L	PF	PA	+/−	Pts
Samoa	4	4	0	0	140	10	+130	12
Australia	4	3	0	1	117	36	+81	10
Cook Islands	4	2	0	2	58	64	-6	8
New Caledonia	4	1	0	3	38	124	-86	6
Solomon Islands	4	0	0	4	24	143	-119	4

11 November 2016
11:03

Cook Islands	24-7	New Caledonia

11 November 2016
11:24

Australia	43-0	Solomon Islands

11 November 2016
13:30

Australia	12-7	Cook Islands

11 November 2016
13:51

Samoa	52-0	Solomon Islands

11 November 2016
15:57

Australia	57-5	New Caledonia

11 November 2016
16:18

Samoa	33-5	Cook Islands

11 November 2016
18:24

Solomon Islands	12-26	New Caledonia

11 November 2016
18:45

Australia	5-24	Samoa

12 November 2016
11:00

Cook Islands	22-12	Solomon Islands

12 November 2016
11:42

Samoa	31-0	New Caledonia

== Knockout stage ==
9th-10th Place

Final
12 November 2016 – 16:19
Nauru	22
Solomon Islands	19

5th-8th Place

Semi-finals
12 November 2016 – 13:52
Tonga	26
New Caledonia	7
12 November – 14:13
American Samoa	14
Cook Islands	15

Final
12 November 2016 - 17:01
Tonga	19
Cook Islands	0
Third place
12 November 2016 - 16:40
New Caledonia	19
American Samoa	26

Cup

Semi-finals
12 November 2016 – 14:34
Samoa	17
Papua New Guinea	12
12 November – 14:55
Fiji	19
Australia	7

Final
12 November 2016 - 19:08
Samoa	19
Fiji	28
Third place
12 November 2016 - 18:19
Papua New Guinea	0
Australia	25

== Final standings ==
Legend
Winner
Qualified for the 2017 Hong Kong Sevens.

Rank	Team
1st place, gold medalist(s)	Fiji
2nd place, silver medalist(s)	Samoa
3rd place, bronze medalist(s)	Australia
4	Papua New Guinea
5	Tonga
6	Cook Islands
7	American Samoa
8	New Caledonia
9	Nauru
10	Solomon Islands
