= Rugby sevens at the 2023 Pacific Games – Men's tournament =

Men's rugby sevens at the 2023 Pacific Games
- Venue: National Stadium
- Location: Honiara, Solomon Islands
- Dates: 23–25 November 2023
- Competitors: 156
- Teams: 13

Medalists
gold medal	Fiji
silver medal	Samoa
bronze medal	Tonga

The men's rugby sevens tournament at the 2023 Pacific Games was held in the Solomon Islands at the National Stadium. The tournament was played over three days from 23 to 25 November 2023.

Fiji beat Samoa in the final to claim the gold medal, and Tonga claimed bronze after defeating Papua New Guinea.

== Participating teams ==
Thirteen countries and territories have entered teams for the men's rugby sevens tournament.

- American Samoa
- Cook Islands
- Fiji
- Kiribati
- Nauru
- Papua New Guinea
- Samoa
- Solomon Islands (Host)
- (French Polynesia) Tahiti
- Tonga
- Tuvalu
- Vanuatu
- Wallis and Futuna

== Pool stage ==
=== Pool A ===
Pos	Team	P	W	D	L	PF	PA	PD	Pts	Qualification
1	Fiji	2	2	0	0	131	0	+131	6	Quarterfinals
2	American Samoa	2	1	0	1	24	60	–36	4	Quarterfinals
3	Kiribati	2	0	0	2	5	100	–95	2	

23 November
12:36 PM

American Samoa	24–5	Kiribati

National Stadium, Honiara

23 November
19:24 PM

American Samoa	0–55	Fiji

National Stadium, Honiara

24 November
14:12 PM

Fiji	76–0	Kiribati

National Stadium, Honiara

=== Pool B ===
Pos	Team	P	W	D	L	PF	PA	PD	Pts	Qualification
1	Samoa	2	2	0	0	55	29	+26	6	Quarterfinals
2	Vanuatu	2	1	0	1	34	46	–12	4	Quarterfinals
3	Tuvalu	2	0	0	2	31	45	–14	2	

23 November
12:12 PM

Tuvalu	17–19	Vanuatu

National Stadium, Honiara

23 November
19:00 PM

Samoa	26–14	Tuvalu

National Stadium, Honiara

24 November
13:48 PM

Samoa	29–15	Vanuatu

National Stadium, Honiara

=== Pool C ===
Pos	Team	P	W	D	L	PF	PA	PD	Pts	Qualification
1	Tonga	2	2	0	0	67	0	+67	6	Quarterfinals
2	Cook Islands	2	1	0	1	27	21	+6	4	Quarterfinals
3	Nauru	2	0	0	2	0	73	–73	2	

23 November
11:48 AM

Cook Islands	27–0	Nauru

National Stadium, Honiara

23 November
18:36 PM

Nauru	0–46	Tonga

National Stadium, Honiara

24 November
13:24 PM

Cook Islands	0–21	Tonga

National Stadium, Honiara

=== Pool D ===
Pos	Team	P	W	D	L	PF	PA	PD	Pts	Qualification
1	Papua New Guinea	3	3	0	0	116	10	+106	9	Quarterfinals
2	Solomon Islands	3	2	0	1	73	19	+54	7	Quarterfinals
3	Tahiti	3	1	0	2	14	103	–89	5	
4	Wallis and Futuna	3	0	0	3	7	78	–71	3	

23 November
11:00 AM

Solomon Islands	34–0	Tahiti

National Stadium, Honiara

23 November
11:24 AM

Papua New Guinea	35–0	Wallis and Futuna

National Stadium, Honiara

23 November
17:48 PM

Solomon Islands	29–0	Wallis and Futuna

National Stadium, Honiara

23 November
18:12 PM

Papua New Guinea	62–0	Tahiti

National Stadium, Honiara

24 November
12:36 PM

Tahiti	14–7	Wallis and Futuna

National Stadium, Honiara

24 November
13:00 PM

Papua New Guinea	19–10	Solomon Islands

National Stadium, Honiara

== Knockout stage ==
=== Championship Quarter-finals ===
Quarter-finals
24 November – 18:24 PM
Samoa	36
Cook Islands	0
24 November – 18:48 PM
Tonga	43
Vanuatu	5
24 November – 19:12 PM
Papua New Guinea	39
American Samoa	5
24 November – 19:36 PM
Fiji	74
Solomon Islands	0

Semi-finals
25 November – 13:24 PM
Samoa	24
Tonga	12
25 November – 13:48 PM
Fiji	24
Papua New Guinea	10

Gold Medal
25 November
Fiji	19
Samoa	5
Bronze Medal
25 November
Tonga	19
Papua New Guinea	7

=== 5th–8th Place Semi-finals ===
Semi-finals
25 November
Solomon Islands	15
Cook Islands	7
25 November
American Samoa	20
Vanuatu	5

5th Place
25 November
American Samoa	17
Solomon Islands	10
7th Place
25 November
Vanuatu	12
Cook Islands	7

=== 9th–12th Place Semi-finals ===
Semi-finals
24 November – 17:36 PM
Tahiti	12
Kiribati	0
24 November – 18:00 PM
Tuvalu	15
Nauru	10

9th Place
25 November
Tuvalu	15
Tahiti	0
11th Place
25 November
Nauru	22
Kiribati	12

== Final ranking ==
Pos	Team
1st place, gold medalist(s)	Fiji
2nd place, silver medalist(s)	Samoa
3rd place, bronze medalist(s)	Tonga
4	Papua New Guinea
5	American Samoa
6	Solomon Islands
7	Vanuatu
8	Cook Islands
9	Tuvalu
10	Tahiti
11	Nauru
12	Kiribati
13	Wallis and Futuna

== See also ==
- Rugby sevens at the Pacific Games
- Rugby sevens at the 2023 Pacific Games – Women's tournament
