= 2013 Oceania Sevens Championship =

- Host nation: Fiji
- Date: 4–5 October 2013

Cup
- Champion: Samoa
- Runner-up: Fiji
- Third: Australia

Plate
- Winner: American Samoa
- Runner-up: Papua New Guinea

The 2013 Oceania Sevens Championship was the sixth Oceania Sevens in men's rugby sevens. It was held at ANZ Stadium in Suva, Fiji.

Samoa won the Oceania Sevens Championship by defeating Fiji 31-17. Cook Islands and American Samoa, as the two highest finishers excluding core teams Fiji, Australia and Samoa, qualified for the 2013 Hong Kong Sevens and the opportunity later to qualify for the 2013–14 IRB Sevens World Series.

== Pool Stage ==
Key to colours in group tables
Teams that advanced to the Cup Quarterfinal

=== Pool A ===
Team	Pld	W	D	L	PF	PA	PD	Pts
Fiji	3	3	0	0				9
Cook Islands	3	2	0	1				7
Papua New Guinea	3	1	0	2				5
Tuvalu	3	0	0	3				3

4 October 2013

Cook Islands	14–10	Papua New Guinea

ANZ Stadium, Suva

4 October 2013

Fiji	48–0	Tuvalu

ANZ Stadium, Suva

4 October 2013

Fiji	41–0	Cook Islands

ANZ Stadium, Suva

4 October 2013

Papua New Guinea	54–0	Tuvalu

ANZ Stadium, Suva

4 October 2013

Cook Islands	28–10	Tuvalu

ANZ Stadium, Suva

4 October 2013

Fiji	44–0	Papua New Guinea

ANZ Stadium, Suva

=== Pool B ===
Team	Pld	W	D	L	PF	PA	PD	Pts
Samoa	3	3	0	0				9
Australia	3	2	0	1				7
American Samoa	3	1	0	2				5
Solomon Islands	3	0	0	3				3

4 October 2013

Australia	31–0	American Samoa

ANZ Stadium, Suva

4 October 2013

Samoa	43–0	Solomon Islands

ANZ Stadium, Suva

4 October 2013

Australia	43–0	Solomon Islands

ANZ Stadium, Suva

4 October 2013

American Samoa	0–45	Samoa

ANZ Stadium, Suva

4 October 2013

American Samoa	14–7	Solomon Islands

ANZ Stadium, Suva

4 October 2013

Australia	12–26	Samoa

ANZ Stadium, Suva

== Knockout stage ==
=== Plate ===
5th–8th semi-finals
5 October 2013 - ANZ Stadium, Suva
American Samoa	24
Solomon Islands	7
5 October 2013 - ANZ Stadium, Suva
Tuvalu
Papua New Guinea

5th–6th play-off
5 October 2013 - ANZ Stadium, Suva
American Samoa	29
Papua New Guinea	19
7th–8th play-off
5 October 2013 - ANZ Stadium, Suva
Solomon Islands	33
Tuvalu	0

=== Cup ===
Quarter-finals
5 October 2013 - ANZ Stadium, Suva
Fiji
Solomon Islands
5 October 2013 - ANZ Stadium, Suva
Papua New Guinea	19
Australia	36
5 October 2013 - ANZ Stadium, Suva
Cook Islands	26
American Samoa	14
5 October 2013 - ANZ Stadium, Suva
Tuvalu
Samoa

Semi-finals
5 October 2013 - ANZ Stadium, Suva
Fiji	31
Australia	17
5 October 2013 - ANZ Stadium, Suva
Cook Islands	0
Samoa	48

Final
5 October 2013 - ANZ Stadium, Suva
Fiji	17
Samoa	31
Third place
5 October 2013 - ANZ Stadium, Suva
Cook Islands	5
Australia	49

== Final standings ==
Legend
A core team in the 2012–13 IRB Sevens World Series
Qualified to play in 2013 Hong Kong Sevens

Rank	Team
1st place, gold medalist(s)	Samoa
2nd place, silver medalist(s)	Fiji
3rd place, bronze medalist(s)	Australia
4	Cook Islands
5	American Samoa
6	Papua New Guinea
7	Solomon Islands
8	Tuvalu
