= Rugby sevens at the 2007 South Pacific Games =

- Venue: Apia, Samoa
- Dates: 31 August–1 September
- Nations: 10

Rugby sevens at the 2007 South Pacific Games took place from 31 August to 1 September 2007 at Apia, Samoa. Fiji won their third Pacific Games gold medal after defeating Samoa in the final, and Papua New Guinea defeated the Solomon Islands to win bronze.

== Medal summary ==
Event	Gold	Silver	Bronze
Men's rugby 7s	Fiji	Samoa	Papua New Guinea

== Participants ==
Ten teams competed at the tournament:

- Cook Islands
- Fiji
- New Caledonia
- Papua New Guinea
- Samoa
- Solomon Islands
- Tahiti
- Tokelau
- Tuvalu
- Vanuatu

== Preliminary round ==
=== Group A ===
Teams	Pld	W	D	L	PF	PA	+/−
Fiji	4	4	0	0	192	7	+185
Papua New Guinea	4	3	0	1	95	38	+57
Tahiti	4	2	0	2	53	106	–53
Vanuatu	4	1	0	3	38	107	–69
Tuvalu	4	0	0	4	12	107	–95

Fiji	31–7	Papua New Guinea

Tahiti	22–19	Vanuatu

Fiji	56–0	Tuvalu

Papua New Guinea	22–7	Tahiti

Vanuatu	19–7	Tuvalu

Fiji	60–0	Tahiti

Papua New Guinea	33–0	Vanuatu

Tahiti	24–5	Tuvalu

Fiji	45–0	Vanuatu

Papua New Guinea	33–0	Tuvalu

=== Group B ===
Teams	Pld	W	D	L	PF	PA	+/−
Samoa	4	4	0	0	184	0	+184
Solomon Islands	4	3	0	1	51	54	–3
Tokelau	4	2	0	2	24	75	–51
Cook Islands	4	1	0	3	48	64	–16
New Caledonia	4	0	0	4	10	124	–114

Samoa	47–0	Cook Islands

Solomon Islands	19–10	New Caledonia

Samoa	48–0	Tokelau

Cook Islands	38–0	New Caledonia

Solomon Islands	22–0	Tokelau

Samoa	50–0	New Caledonia

Solomon Islands	10–5	Cook Islands

Tokelau	17–0	New Caledonia

Samoa	39–0	Solomon Islands

Tokelau	7–5	Cook Islands

== Knockout stage ==
=== Cup Finals ===
Semi-finals
Samoa	39
Papua New Guinea	0
Fiji	48
Solomon Islands	0

Cup Final
Fiji	26
Samoa	19
3rd Place
Papua New Guinea	31
Solomon Islands	5

=== Plate Finals ===
Semi-finals
Tokelau	12
Vanuatu	10
Cook Islands	22
Tahiti	17

Plate Final
Tokelau	19
Cook Islands	12
7th Place
Tahiti	17
Vanuatu	10

=== Bowl Final ===
Bowl Final
New Caledonia	17
Tuvalu	0

== See also ==
- Rugby sevens at the Pacific Games
- Pacific Games
