= Cook Islands national rugby sevens team =

Cook Islands Rugby Sevens
- Union: Cook Islands Rugby Union
- Nickname: Kuki 7s
- Coach: Andrew Iro
- Captain: Stephen Willis
Team kit

World Cup Sevens
- Appearances: 2 (First in 1997)
- Best result: 11th (1997)

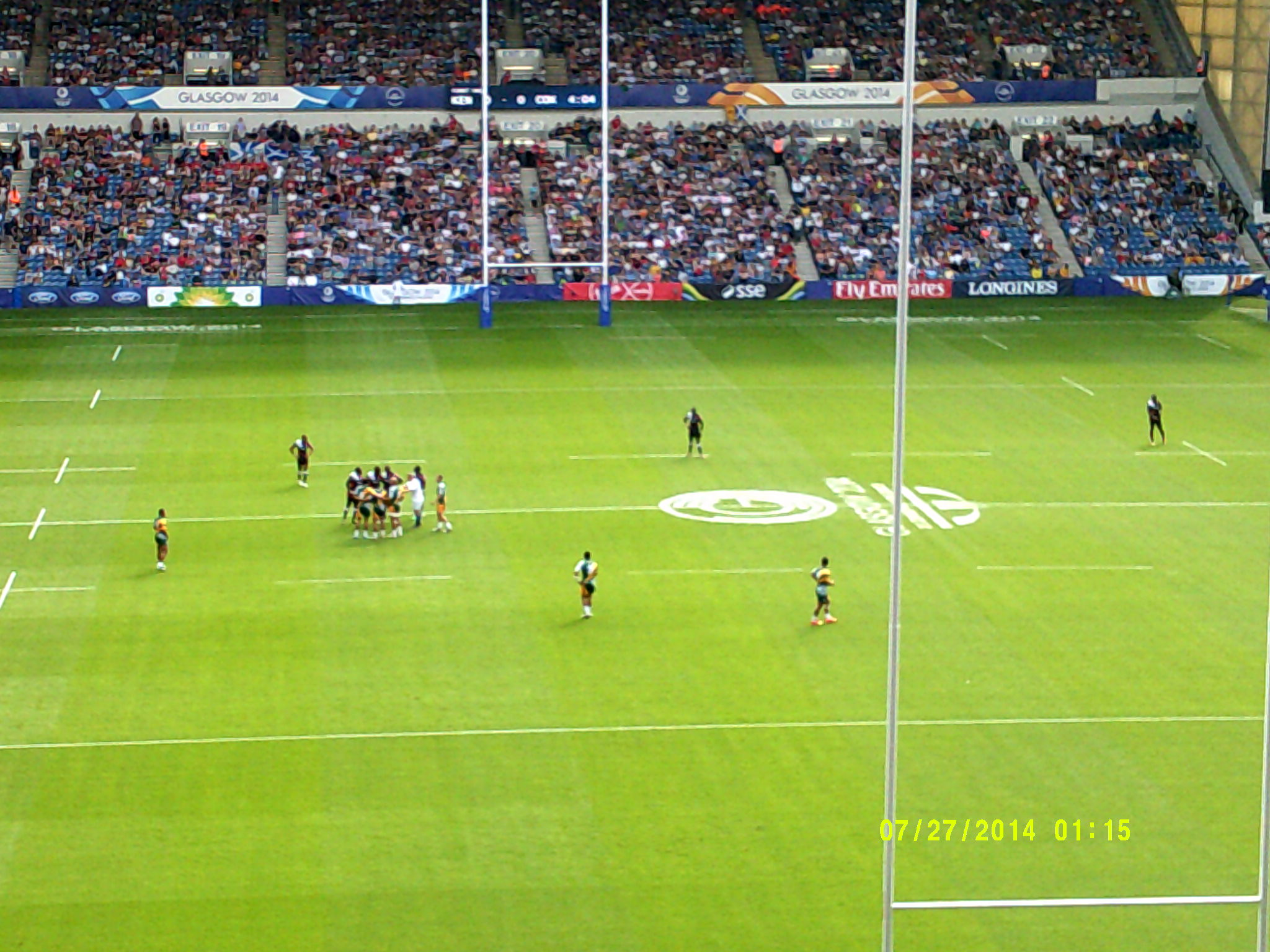
Kenya sevens team playing the Cook Islands at 2014 Commonwealth Games

The Cook Islands national rugby sevens team represents the Cook Islands in rugby sevens internationally. They have participated in two Rugby World Cup Sevens tournaments, in 1997 and 2001, and have also competed at the Commonwealth Games on four occasions. They qualified for the 2014 Hong Kong Sevens tournament and played in the World Series Qualifiers.

The Cook Islands also compete in the Oceania Sevens Championships and the Pacific Games.

== History ==
Cook Islands lost to Papua New Guinea at the 2017 Oceania Sevens Championship which denied them a place at the Sydney and Hamilton legs of the World Series and also qualification for the 2018 Commonwealth Games and Rugby World Cup Sevens.

They competed at the 2023 Oceania Sevens Championship in Brisbane, and finished eighth overall after losing to Australia in the seventh place playoff.

== Tournament history ==
The Cook Islands has not qualified for the Summer Olympics.

=== Rugby World Cup Sevens ===
Rugby World Cup Sevens Record
Year	Round	Position	Pld	W	L	D
(Scotland) 1993	Did Not Enter					
(Hong Kong) 1997	Plate Semifinalists	11th	6	3	3	0
(Argentina) 2001	Plate Quarterfinalists	13th	6	3	3	0
(Hong Kong) 2005	Did not qualify					
(United Arab Emirates) 2009	Did not qualify					
(Russia) 2013	Did not qualify					
(United States) 2018	Did not qualify					
(South Africa) 2022	Did not qualify					
Total	0 Titles	2/8	12	6	6	0

=== Commonwealth Games ===
Commonwealth Games record
Year	Round	Position	Pld	W	L	D
(Malaysia) 1998	Plate Winners	9th	7	5	2	0
(England) 2002	Bowl Semifinalists	11th	4	1	3	0
(Australia) 2006	Bowl Quarterfinalists	13th	4	1	3	0
(India) 2010	Did not qualify					
(Scotland) 2014	Bowl Finalist	10th	6	3	3	0
(Australia) 2018	Did not qualify					
(England) 2022	Did not qualify					
Total	0 Titles	4/7	21	10	11	0

=== Pacific Games ===
Pacific Games
Year	Round	Position	Pld	W	D	L
(Guam) 1999	Did Not Compete					
(Fiji) 2003	Cup Final	2nd place, silver medalist(s)	6	4	0	2
(Samoa) 2007	Plate Final	6th	6	2	0	4
(New Caledonia) 2011	Did Not Compete					
(Papua New Guinea) 2015	Did Not Compete					
(Samoa) 2019	Bronze Final	4th	5	3	0	2
(Solomon Islands) 2023	7th Place Playoff	8th	5	1	0	4
Total	0 Titles	4/7	22	10	0	12

=== Oceania Sevens ===
Oceania Sevens
Year	Round	Position	Pld	W	D	L
(Samoa) 2008	Bronze Final	3rd place, bronze medalist(s)	5	3	0	2
(French Polynesia) 2009	Plate Final	5th	7	3	0	4
(Australia) 2010	Plate Final	5th	6	3	0	3
(Samoa) 2011	Plate Final	5th	7	3	0	4
(Australia) 2012	Bronze Final	4th	6	2	0	4
(Fiji) 2013	Bronze Final	4th	6	3	0	3
(Australia) 2014	7th Place Playoff	7th	6	3	0	3
(New Zealand) 2015	Plate Final	5th	6	3	0	3
(Fiji) 2016	5th Place Playoff	6th	6	3	0	3
(Fiji) 2017	5th Place Playoff	6th	6	2	0	4
(Fiji) 2018	5th Place Playoff	6th	5	2	0	3
(Fiji) 2019	9th Place Playoff	10th	6	1	0	5
(Australia) 2021	Did Not Compete					
(New Zealand) 2022	Did Not Compete					
(Australia) 2023	7th Place Playoff	8th	5	2	0	3
Total	0 Titles	13/15	77	33	0	44

== Players ==
Cook Islands squad to the 2023 Pacific Games in Honiara, Solomon Islands:

Players
Brian Akava
Albert Etuete
Robert Heather
Te Ara Henderson
Apolo Johnson
James Kora
Mataroa Maui
Okirua Naea
Alistair Newbigging
Taio Taio
Habasaloma Tamarua
Timothy Tangirere
Leandro Vakatini
Stephen Willis

=== Notable players ===
- Koiatu Koiatu
- Terry Piri
- Harry Berryman

== See also ==
- Cook Islands national rugby union team (XV)
- Rugby union in the Cook Islands
