= Rugby sevens at the 1999 South Pacific Games =

- Venue: Wettengel Rugby Field, Guam
- Dates: June
- Nations: 10

Rugby sevens at the 1999 Pacific Games was contested by ten men's teams on 5 June 1999 at Wettengel Rugby Field in Guam. Fiji claimed the gold medal after defeating Papua New Guinea 40–12 in the final.

== Medal summary ==
Event	Gold	Silver	Bronze
Men's rugby 7s	Fiji	Papua New Guinea	Vanuatu

== Participants ==
Ten teams competed in the tournament:

- Fiji
- Guam
- Micronesia
- New Caledonia
- Northern Mariana Islands
- Papua New Guinea
- Solomon Islands
- Tahiti
- Vanuatu
- Wallis and Futuna

== Preliminary round ==
=== Pool A ===
Teams	Pld	W	D	L	PF	PA	+/−	Pts
Fiji	4	4	0	0	295	7	+288	12
Solomon Islands	4	3	0	1	109	55	+54	10
Wallis and Futuna	4	1	0	3	63	135	–72	6
Micronesia	4	1	0	3	45	195	–150	6
Guam	4	1	0	3	24	144	–120	6

5 June 1999

Micronesia	7–52	Solomon Islands

Wettengel Rugby Field

5 June 1999

Guam	19–12	Wallis and Futuna

Wettengel Rugby Field

5 June 1999

Fiji	48–7	Solomon Islands

Wettengel Rugby Field

5 June 1999

Micronesia	38–5	Guam

Wettengel Rugby Field

5 June 1999

Fiji	78–0	Wallis and Futuna

Wettengel Rugby Field

5 June 1999

Solomon Islands	12–0	Guam

Wettengel Rugby Field

5 June 1999

Fiji	82–0	Guam

Wettengel Rugby Field

5 June 1999

Wallis and Futuna	51–0	Micronesia

Wettengel Rugby Field

5 June 1999

Fiji	87–0	Micronesia

Wettengel Rugby Field

5 June 1999

Wallis and Futuna	0–38	Solomon Islands

Wettengel Rugby Field

=== Pool B ===
Teams	Pld	W	D	L	PF	PA	+/−	Pts
Papua New Guinea	4	4	0	0	173	12	+161	12
Vanuatu	4	3	0	1	100	31	+69	10
Tahiti	4	2	0	2	55	72	–17	8
Northern Mariana Islands	4	1	0	3	19	165	–146	6
New Caledonia	4	0	0	4	17	84	–67	4

5 June 1999

Northern Mariana Islands	0–47	Vanuatu

Wettengel Rugby Field

5 June 1999

New Caledonia	5–12	Tahiti

Wettengel Rugby Field

5 June 1999

Papua New Guinea	26–7	Vanuatu

Wettengel Rugby Field

5 June 1999

Northern Mariana Islands	19–7	New Caledonia

Wettengel Rugby Field

5 June 1999

Papua New Guinea	38–5	Tahiti

Wettengel Rugby Field

5 June 1999

Vanuatu	17–5	New Caledonia

Wettengel Rugby Field

5 June 1999

Papua New Guinea	36–0	New Caledonia

Wettengel Rugby Field

5 June 1999

Tahiti	38–0	Northern Mariana Islands

Wettengel Rugby Field

5 June 1999

Papua New Guinea	73–0	Northern Mariana Islands

Wettengel Rugby Field

5 June 1999

Tahiti	0–29	Vanuatu

Wettengel Rugby Field

== Knockout stage ==
=== Cup Final ===
Semi-finals
Fiji	31
Vanuatu	0
Papua New Guinea	17
Solomon Islands	7

Cup Final
Fiji	40
Papua New Guinea	12
3rd Place
Vanuatu	26
Solomon Islands	7

=== Plate & Bowl Final ===
Semi-finals
Tahiti	26
Wallis and Futuna	7
New Caledonia	19
Guam	15

Plate Final
Tahiti	36
New Caledonia	0
Bowl Final
Northern Marianas	27
Micronesia	0

== See also ==
- Rugby sevens at the Pacific Games
- Pacific Games
