= 2021 Oceania Sevens Championship =

- Host nation: Australia
- Date: 25–27 June 2021

Cup
- Champion: Fiji
- Runner-up: New Zealand
- Third: Australia

Tournament details
- Matches played: 12

The 2021 Oceania Sevens Championship was held in Townsville, Australia on the weekend of 25–27 June 2021. The rugby sevens event was sponsored by the PacificAus Sports program (Australian Department of Foreign Affairs and Trade), and was the thirteenth Oceania Sevens tournament in men's rugby sevens.

The competition was the final official tournament for Oceania Rugby national teams ahead of the Tokyo Olympic Sevens. It was played as a double round-robin format at the North Queensland Stadium, commercially known as Queensland Country Bank Stadium. Fiji won the tournament undefeated, with New Zealand as runner-up.

== Teams ==
Four men's teams competed at the 2021 tournament:

- Australia
- Fiji
- New Zealand
- Oceania Barbarians

== Tournament ==
The tournament mirrored the Olympic three-day schedule, with each team playing two matches per day. Each team played the other three teams twice. The highest ranked team after all matches were completed was declared the champion.

=== Standings ===
Pos	Team	P	W	D	L	PF	PA	PD	Pts
1	Fiji	6	6	0	0	148	64	+84	24
2	New Zealand	6	4	0	2	116	86	+30	18
3	Australia	5	1	0	4	75	98	−27	8
4	Oceania Barbarians	5	0	0	5	51	142	−91	5

=== Round 1 ===
25 Jun
14:00

Fiji	26–14	Australia

North Queensland Stadium, Townsville

25 Jun
14:22

New Zealand	28–5	Oceania Barbarians

North Queensland Stadium, Townsville

=== Round 2 ===
25 Jun
19:30

Fiji	32–12	Oceania Barbarians

North Queensland Stadium, Townsville

25 Jun
19:52

New Zealand	24–21	Australia

North Queensland Stadium, Townsville

=== Round 3 ===
26 Jun
12:00

Australia	28–12	Oceania Barbarians

North Queensland Stadium, Townsville

26 Jun
12:22

New Zealand	19–21	Fiji

North Queensland Stadium, Townsville

=== Round 4 ===
26 Jun
19:30

Fiji	19–7	Australia

North Queensland Stadium, Townsville

26 Jun
19:52

New Zealand	21–17	Oceania Barbarians

North Queensland Stadium, Townsville

=== Round 5 ===
27 Jun
12:30

Fiji	33–5	Oceania Barbarians

North Queensland Stadium, Townsville

27 Jun
12:52

New Zealand	17–5	Australia

North Queensland Stadium, Townsville

=== Round 6 ===
27 Jun
17:45

Australia	Cancelled	Oceania Barbarians

North Queensland Stadium, Townsville

27 Jun
18:07

New Zealand	7–17	Fiji

North Queensland Stadium, Townsville

== Placings ==
Place	Team
1st place, gold medalist(s)	Fiji
2nd place, silver medalist(s)	New Zealand
3rd place, bronze medalist(s)	Australia
4	Oceania Barbarians

== See also ==
- 2021 Oceania Women's Sevens Championship
