= 2017 in rugby union =

This page covers the major events of 2017 in rugby union.

== International tournaments ==
- 31 May – 18 June: 2017 World Rugby Under 20 Championship in Georgia
  - New Zealand defeated England 64–17 to win their sixth World Rugby Under 20 Championship title.
  - South Africa took third place.
- 9 – 26 August: 2017 Women's Rugby World Cup in Ireland (pool stage in Ireland; knockout rounds and classification matches in Northern Ireland)
  - New Zealand defeated England 41–32 to win their fifth Women's World Cup title.
  - France defeated the United States 31–23 to take third place.
- 29 August – 10 September: 2017 World Rugby Under 20 Trophy in Uruguay
- 2017 Cup of Nations

=== Northern hemisphere national teams ===
- 3 September 2016 – 20 May 2017: 2016–17 Rugby Europe International Championships
  - 24 September 2016 – 24 April 2017: 2016–17 Rugby Europe Trophy in Portugal, the Netherlands, Moldova, Ukraine, Poland, and Switzerland
    - Round Robin: 1st place: Portugal, 2nd place: Netherlands, 3rd place: Switzerland
  - 3 February – 18 March: 2017 Women's Six Nations Championship in England, France, Ireland, Italy, Scotland and Wales
    - Round Robin: 1st place: England, 2nd place: Ireland, 3rd place: France
  - 4 February – 4 March: 2017 Americas Rugby Championship in Argentina, Brazil, Canada, Chile, the United States and Uruguay
    - Round Robin - 1st place: United States; 2nd place: Argentina XV; 3rd place: Uruguay
  - 4 February – 18 March: 2017 Six Nations Championship in England, France, Ireland, Italy, Scotland and Wales
    - Round Robin: 1st place: England, 2nd place: Ireland, 3rd place: France
  - 11 February – 19 March: 2017 Rugby Europe Championship in Belgium, Georgia, Germany, Romania, Russia and Spain
    - Round Robin: 1st place: Romania, 2nd place: Georgia, 3rd place: Spain
  - 22 April – 3 June: 2017 Asia Rugby Championship in Hong Kong, Japan and South Korea
    - Round Robin: 1st place: Japan, 2nd place: Hong Kong, 3rd place: South Korea

=== Southern hemisphere national teams ===
- 10 – 18 March: 2017 World Rugby Pacific Challenge
  - Champions: Fiji Warriors; Second: Junior Japan; Third: Tonga A; Fourth: Samoa A
- 1 – 15 July: 2017 World Rugby Pacific Nations Cup
  - Champions: Fiji; Second: Tonga; Third: Samoa
- 19 August – 7 October: 2017 Rugby Championship
- 2017 Sudamérica Rugby Cup

== Club tournaments ==
=== Northern hemisphere clubs ===
- 26 August 2016 – 14 January 2017: (Japan) 2016–17 Top League, won by Suntory Sungoliath
- 14 October 2016 – 13 May 2017: 2016–17 European Rugby Champions Cup, won by (England) Saracens
- 13 October 2016 – 12 May 2017: 2016–17 European Rugby Challenge Cup, won by (France) Stade Français
- 2 September 2016 – 27 May 2017: 2016–17 Pro12, won by (Wales) Scarlets
- 20 August 2016 – 4 June 2017: (France) 2016–17 Top 14 season, won by Clermont
- 2 September 2016 – 27 May 2017: (England) 2016–17 Aviva Premiership, won by Exeter Chiefs

=== Southern hemisphere clubs ===
- January 30 – April 17: 2017 Varsity Cup in South Africa, won by UP Tuks
- February 9 – April 10: 2017 Varsity Shield in South Africa, won by UWC
- February 23 – August 5: 2017 Super Rugby season in South Africa, New Zealand, Australia, Argentina and Japan, won by the Crusaders
- August – October: 2017 Currie Cup Premier Division in South Africa, won by Western Province
- 2 September – 11 November: 2017 National Rugby Championship in Australia and Fiji, won by Queensland Country

== Rugby sevens ==
- 2 December 2016 – 21 May 2017: 2016–17 World Rugby Sevens Series
  - Champions: South Africa; Second: England; Third: Fiji
- 1 December 2016 – 25 June 2017: 2016–17 World Rugby Women's Sevens Series
  - Champions: New Zealand; Second: Australia; Third: Canada

=== 2017 Rugby Europe Men's Sevens Championships ===
- Grand Prix Series
  - June 3 – 4: #1 in (Russia) Moscow
    - Winners: Ireland (Cup); France (Plate); England (Bowl)
  - June 10 – 11: #2 in (Poland) Łódź
    - Winners: Russia (Cup); Germany (Plate); Italy (Bowl)
  - July 1 – 2: #3 in (France) Clermont-Ferrand
    - Winners: Ireland (Cup); Wales (Plate); Italy (Bowl)
  - July 15 – 16: #4 (final) in (England) Exeter
    - Winners: Russia (Cup); Georgia (Plate); France (Bowl)
- Men's Trophy Tournament
  - June 3 – 4: #1 in (Czech Republic) Ostrava
    - Winners: Sweden (Cup); Israel (Plate); Moldova (Bowl)
  - June 17 – 18: #2 (final) in (Romania) Bucharest
    - Winners: Sweden (Cup); Croatia (Plate); Cyprus (Bowl)
- July 1 – 2: Men's Conference 1 in (Bulgaria) Burgas
  - Winners: Hungary (Cup); Serbia (Plate); Monaco (Bowl)
- July 15 – 16: Men's Conference 2 in (Estonia) Tallinn
  - Winners: Saint Petersburg (Cup); Liechtenstein (Bowl)

== Headlines ==
- 13 March – The two Paris-based clubs in the Top 14, Racing 92 and Stade Français, announced plans to merge into a single club, effective with the 2017–18 season.
- 16 March – World Rugby announced details of a new global rugby calendar taking effect after the 2019 Rugby World Cup and running until 2032. Highlights include:
  - The June Test window will be shifted to July, allowing Super Rugby to conduct an uninterrupted season.
  - The windows for November Tests and the Rugby World Cup will move forward by a week.
  - The new July Test window will include opportunities for "Tier 2" nations, among them Canada, Georgia, Japan, the Pacific islands, Romania, and the U.S., to host tours by Tier 1 national teams. WR stated that the number of annual matches between Tier 1 and Tier 2 national teams would increase by nearly 40 percent.
  - In the years following Rugby World Cups, SANZAAR nations (Rugby Championship participants) will only play two July Tests.
- 19 March – Racing 92 and Stade Français announced that their planned merger had collapsed following major resistance, including a strike by Stade players.
- 9 April – Super Rugby organiser SANZAAR announced that the competition would drop three of its 18 teams after the 2017 season. Australia will lose one of its five teams, and South Africa two of its six. The affected unions were to determine which franchises would be axed.
- 10 April – RugbyWA, the governing body for the sport in Western Australia and operator of the Western Force, one of two Australian sides in danger of being axed from Super Rugby, announced that it had brought legal action against the Australian Rugby Union regarding the process of determining the franchise to be contracted.
- 10 May – World Rugby announced significant reform of its Regulation 8, which covers international eligibility:
  - From 31 December 2020 forward, the required period of continuous residency in a country for purposes of international eligibility will increase from three years to five. (This only applies if a player does not qualify for that country by birth, or by the birth of a parent or grandparent in said country.)
  - Effective immediately, individuals with 10 years of cumulative residency in a country who are not previously tied to another national team will be eligible for that country, even if they do not meet the continuous residency requirement.
  - Effective 1 January 2018, a member union cannot nominate its under-20 national team as its "A" side. This means that playing on or against a U-20 national team will not bind the player to that country at senior level. (Note that a 15-a-side match cannot bind a player to a given national union unless both the player's team and its opposition are senior or "A" national sides.)
  - Effective 1 July 2017, rugby sevens players will not be tied to a national union until either of the following events occurs:
    - They play for a senior national sevens team after reaching age 20.
    - They represent a national team in the Olympic sevens tournament or Rugby World Cup Sevens after reaching age 18.
- 30 June – BBC Wales reported that the Cheetahs and Southern Kings, the two most likely South African teams to be dropped from Super Rugby, would join the European Pro12 competition as early as the 2017–18 season.
- 7 July – The South African Rugby Union announced that the Cheetahs and Kings would be dropped from Super Rugby.
- 1 August – Pro12 organiser Celtic Rugby Limited announced that the Cheetahs and Southern Kings would be added to the renamed Pro14 competition from the 2017–18 season forward.
- 10 November – The 2017 induction class of the World Rugby Hall of Fame was enshrined at a ceremony held at the Hall's facility in Rugby. Inductees were:
  - Rob Andrew, England
  - Al Charron, Canada
  - Felipe Contepomi, Argentina
  - Phaidra Knight, United States
  - Fabien Pelous, France
- 15 November – World Rugby announced that France would host the 2023 Rugby World Cup.
- 26 November – The 2017 World Rugby Awards were presented at a gala in Monaco:
  - Men's Player of the Year: Beauden Barrett, New Zealand
  - Women's Player of the Year: Portia Woodman, New Zealand
  - Team of the Year: New Zealand Women
  - Coach of the Year: (Australia) Eddie Jones, England
  - Breakthrough Player of the Year: Rieko Ioane, New Zealand
  - Men's Sevens Player of the Year: Perry Baker, United States
  - Women's Sevens Player of the Year: Michaela Blyde, New Zealand
  - World Rugby Referee Award: Joy Neville, Ireland
  - World Rugby Award for Character: Eduardo Oderigo, Argentina
  - Vernon Pugh Award for Distinguished Service: Marcel Martin, France
  - IRPA Try of the Year: Joaquín Tuculet, Argentina (vs. England)
  - IRPA Special Merit Award: Richie McCaw, New Zealand and Rachael Burford, England

== Significant deaths ==
- 6 February – Joost van der Westhuizen, South Africa international (45)
- 12 February – Sione Lauaki, Tonga-born New Zealand international (35)
- 18 February – Dan Vickerman, South Africa-born Australia international (37)
- 25 February –
  - Lloyd Williams, Wales international captain (83)
  - Elli Norkett, Wales international (20)
- 11 April – David Perry, England international (79)
- 20 August – Colin Meads, New Zealand international (81)

== See also ==
- 2017 in sports
