= 2018 Hong Kong Sevens =

International rugby sevens tournament

- Sevens World Series XIX
- Host nation: Hong Kong
- Date: 6–8 April 2018

Cup
- Champion: Fiji
- Runner-up: Kenya
- Third: South Africa

Challenge
- Winner: France

Qualifier
- Winner: Japan

Tournament details
- Matches played: 45
- Most points: (Fiji) Amenoni Nasilasila (60)
- Most tries: (United States) Carlin Isles (7) (South Africa) Muller du Plessis (7) (South Africa) Selvyn Davids (7)

The 2018 Hong Kong Sevens was the 43rd edition of the Hong Kong Sevens tournament, and the seventh tournament of the 2017–18 World Rugby Sevens Series. The performance from this tournament determined the first fourteen seedings of the 2018 Rugby World Cup Sevens tournament alongside the past year's series and the previous six event of the 2017–18 season.

Fiji won the tournament, defeating Kenya 24–12 in the final. Fiji were dominant throughout the tournament, including a 50–7 thrashing of New Zealand during pool play.

In the World Series Qualifier tournament, Ireland were the dominant team during pool play, but Japan beat Ireland 12–7 in the semifinal, and went on to beat Germany 19–14 in the final to qualify for the 2018-19 World Series as a core team.

== Main draw ==
=== Teams ===
The main tournament will consist of the fifteen core teams and one invited team, South Korea.

- Argentina
- Australia
- Canada
- England
- Fiji
- France
- Kenya
- New Zealand
- Russia
- Samoa
- Scotland
- South Africa
- Spain
- United States
- Wales
- South Korea

=== Format ===
As in the last tournament, there will be a main draw with the fifteen World Series core teams and one invited team. The teams are drawn into four pools of four teams each. Each team plays all the others in their pool once. 3, 2 or 1 points for a win, draw or loss. The top two teams from each pool advance to the Cup brackets. The bottom two teams go into the Challenge trophy brackets.

=== Pool stage ===
All times in Hong Kong Time (UTC+08:00). The games as scheduled are as follows:

==== Pool A ====
Pos	Team	Pld	W	D	L	PF	PA	PD	Pts
1	Fiji	3	3	0	0	117	33	+84	9
2	New Zealand	3	2	0	1	62	67	−5	7
3	Samoa	3	1	0	2	52	69	−17	5
4	Russia	3	0	0	3	38	100	−62	3

6 April 2018	New Zealand	36–5	Russia	Hong Kong Stadium
20:18	Try: Nicole 1'm Ravouvou 2'm, 7'c Rokolosoa 8'c Ng Shiu 9'm Te Tamaki 12'c Con: Rokolosoa (2/2) 7', 12' Khan (1/4) 8'		Try: Ovchinnikov 14'm Con: Ianiushkin (0/1)	Referee: (Argentina) Damián Schneider

6 April 2018	Fiji	31–12	Samoa	Hong Kong Stadium
20:43	Try: Sau 0'm Nasoko 1'c Ravouvou 6'c Nasilasila 9'c Kunatani 14'c Con: Ravouvou (1/3) 6'; Nasilasila (2/2) 10', 14'		Try: Ale 8'c Iosefo 13'; Con: Tupou (1/1) 9'; Mealoi (0/1)	Referee: (Scotland) Sam Grove-White

7 April 2018	New Zealand	19–12	Samoa	Hong Kong Stadium
13:32	Try: Ravouvou 3'c Te Temaki 9'c Masirewa 12'm Con: Khan (2/3) 4', 9'		Try: Iosefo 5'c, 8'm Con: Alosio (1/2) 5'; Cards: Mealoi (red card) 13'	Referee: (Australia) Damon Murphy

7 April 2018	Fiji	36–14	Russia	Hong Kong Stadium
13:54	Try: Katonibau 0'c, 4'c Kunatani 1'm, 5'm, 9'c Vakurunabili 11'm Con: Nasilasila (3/6) 0', 4', 10'; Cards: Kunavula (yellow card) 6' to 8'		Try: Zhivatov 7'c Lazarenko 14'c Con: Ianiushkin (1/1) 7'; Gostyuzhev (1/1) 14'	Referee: (Argentina) Damián Schneider

7 April 2018	Russia	19–28	Samoa	Hong Kong Stadium
17:32	Try: Sozonov 0'c Davydov 4'c Zhivatov 9'm Con: Sukhin (2/2) 1', 4'; Ianiushkin (0/1)		Try: Iosefo 6'c Alosio 7'c Afamasaga 11'c Tupou 14'c Con: Alosio (1/1) 6'; Paulo (1/1) 7'; Tupou (1/1) 11'; Leilual (1/1) 14'	Referee: (Hong Kong) Matthew Rodden

7 April 2018	Fiji	50–7	New Zealand	Hong Kong Stadium
17:54	Try: Ravouvou 1'c Nasoko 2'm Sau 8'c, 10'm Vakurunabili 8'c Nasilasila 11'c Naduva 12'c, 14'm Con: Ravouvou (2/3) 1', 8', 9'; Nasilasila (2/4) 11', 12'		Try: Nicole 3'c Con: Rokolisoa (1/1) 3'	Referee: (England) Richard Haughton

==== Pool B ====
Pos	Team	Pld	W	D	L	PF	PA	PD	Pts
1	Kenya	3	2	0	1	85	38	+47	7
2	Spain	3	2	0	1	34	50	−16	7
3	Canada	3	1	0	2	56	64	−8	5
4	Australia	3	1	0	2	54	77	−23	5

6 April 2018	Australia	12–17	Spain	Hong Kong Stadium
19:32	Try: Figg 4'c Clunnies-Ross 7'm Con: Goddard (1/2)		Try: Villanueva 1'c I Martín 8'm, 14'm Con: Hernandez (1/2) 2'; Genua (0/1)	Referee: (New Zealand) Richard Kelly

6 April 2018	Kenya	33–10	Canada	Hong Kong Stadium
19:54	Try: Oliech 3'; Amonde 6'c Injera 10'c Ambaka 12'c Oyoo 14'c Con: Oliech (2/3) 6', 10'; Agero (2/2) 12', 14'; Cards: Oyoo (yellow card) 8' to 10'		Try: Braid 2'm Kay 8'm Con: Hirayama (0/2)	Referee: (Australia) Jordan Way

7 April 2018	Australia	14–34	Canada	Hong Kong Stadium
12:48	Try: Skelton 11'c Miller 12'c Con: Goddard (2/2) 11', 13'; Cards: Figg (yellow card) 2' to 4'		Try: Jones 3'm, 7'm Douglas 7'c Braid 8'm Douglas 9'c Moonlight 14'm Con: Hirayama (2/5) 7', 10'; Braid (0/1)	Referee: (England) Richard Haughton

7 April 2018	Kenya	26–0	Spain	Hong Kong Stadium
13:10	Try: Ambaka 2'c, 5'c Injera 6'm Oluoch 9'c Con: Oliech (3/4) 3', 5', 9'		Cards: Pearce (yellow card) 10' to 12'	Referee: (United States) Mike O'Brien

7 April 2018	Spain	17–12	Canada	Hong Kong Stadium
16:48	Try: Carrion 3'm Sainz-Trapaga 5'; Pla 13'; Con: Hernandez (1/3) 5'		Try: Kay 0'm, 7'c Con: Hirayama (1/1) 7'; Cards: Moonlight (yellow card) 14' to 14'	Referee: (Australia) Jordan Way

7 April 2018	Kenya	26–28	Australia	Hong Kong Stadium
17:10	Try: Minjire 5'c Agero 7'c Odhiambo 12'm Amonde 13'c Con: Agero (3/3) 5', 7', 14'; Oliech (0/1); Cards: Oluoch (yellow card) 7' to 9'; Oyoo (red card) 12'		Try: Skelton 0'c Pietsch 1'; Miller 8'c, 12'c Con: Goddard (3/3) 0', 1', 9'; Clunnies-Ross (1/1) 11'	Referee: (New Zealand) James Doleman

==== Pool C ====
Pos	Team	Pld	W	D	L	PF	PA	PD	Pts
1	South Africa	3	3	0	0	109	32	+77	9
2	Scotland	3	2	0	1	100	57	+43	7
3	England	3	1	0	2	81	62	+19	5
4	South Korea	3	0	0	3	14	153	−139	3

6 April 2018	England	19–22	Scotland	Hong Kong Stadium
18:48	Try: Howard 5'm Olowofela 9'c Sirker 13'c Con: Edwards (2/3) 9', 14'		Try: Horne 4'c, 7'm Farndale 12'm Jones 14'; Con: Lowe (1/3) 5'	Referee: (Australia) Damon Murphy

6 April 2018	South Africa	45–0	South Korea	Hong Kong Stadium
19:10	Try: Z Davids 1'c Oosthuizen 2'm, 5'c du Plessis 4'c Bezuidenhout 8'm Ndhlovu 11'c Mafuma 13'c Con: Human (3/4) 1', 4', 6'; S Davids (1/2) 11'; Smith (1/1) 14'			Referee: (Fiji) Tevita Rokovereni

7 April 2018	England	47–7	South Korea	Hong Kong Stadium
12:00	Try: Howard 0'c Olowofela 2'c Wilson 5'c Davis 7'c Davis 10'c Kerr 13'c Glover 14'm Con: Edwards (6/7) 0', 3', 5', 7', 11', 13'		Try: Jang 8'c Con: Lee (1/1) 8'	Referee: (Fiji) Tevita Rokovereni

7 April 2018	South Africa	31–17	Scotland	Hong Kong Stadium
12:22	Try: Z Davids 1'c Gans 4'c du Plessis 10'm Labuschagne 11'c S Davids 12'm Con: Human (2/2) 1', 4'; S Davids (1/3) 12'		Try: Graham 5'm Horne 7'm Bryce 14'c Con: Horne (1/1) 14'; Jackson (0/2)	Referee: (New Zealand) Richard Kelly

7 April 2018	Scotland	61–7	South Korea	Hong Kong Stadium
16:00	Try: McFarland 0'c, 3'c Farndale 4'c, 6'c Jackson 7'm, 13'c Horne 10'c Fagerson 12'c Jones 14'c Con: Jackson (6/6) 0', 4', 5', 12', 14', 14'; Horne (2/3) 6', 10'c		Try: Kim 2'; Con: Lee (1/1) 3'	Referee: (Japan) Nori Hashimoto

7 April 2018	South Africa	33–15	England	Hong Kong Stadium
16:26	Try: Gans 2'c, 14'c S Davids 7'c, 10'm Ndhlovu 14'c Con: Human (1/1) 3'; S Davids (3/4) 7', 14', 14'		Try: Davis 0'm Wilson 4'm Edwards 8'm Con: Edwards (0/3)	Referee: (Scotland) Sam Grove-White

==== Pool D ====
Pos	Team	Pld	W	D	L	PF	PA	PD	Pts
1	United States	3	2	1	0	102	46	+56	8
2	Argentina	3	2	0	1	79	55	+24	7
3	Wales	3	1	0	2	34	85	−51	5
4	France	3	0	1	2	45	74	−29	4

6 April 2018	Argentina	31–10	Wales	Hong Kong Stadium
18:00	Try: Osadczuk 1'm Sabato 5'c, 8'c Etchart 7'm Schultz 14'; Con: Revol (3/5) 5', 8', 14'; Cards: Barbier (yellow card) 11' to 13'		Try: Williams 10'm Devine 11'm Con: Davies (0/2)	Referee: (England) Richard Haughton

6 April 2018	United States	24–24	France	Hong Kong Stadium
18:24	Try: Niua 7'm Baker 12'c Isles 13'c, 14'm Con: Tomasin (2/3) 12', 13'; Niua (0/1)		Try: Lakafia 1'm Dall'Igna 4'c Veredamu 8'c Bonnefond 10'm Con: Barraque (2/4) 4', 8'; Cards: Bonnefond (yellow card) 14' to 14'	Referee: (New Zealand) James Doleman

7 April 2018	Argentina	31–14	France	Hong Kong Stadium
11:14	Try: Osadczuk 2'c, 6'c Roura 4'm Sabato 8'c Schultz 12'm Con: Revol (2/3) 3', 6', 8'; Bazan Velez (0/1)		Try: Bouhraoua 11'c Bonnefond 13'c Con: Riva (2/2) 11', 13'; Cards: Veredamu (yellow card) 1' to 3'	Referee: (Australia) Damon Murphy

7 April 2018	United States	47–5	Wales	Hong Kong Stadium
11:38	Try: Baker 3'c Iosefo 5'c Pinkelman 6'c Unufe 9'c Leuta 10'c Thompson 13'c Isles 14'm Con: Niua (2/2) 3', 7'; Iosefo (2/2) 6', 9'; Tomasin (2/3) 11', 14'		Try: Millard 2'm Con: Davies (0/1)	Referee: (Scotland) Sam Grove-White

7 April 2018	Wales	19–7	France	Hong Kong Stadium
15:16	Try: Flynn 2'c Williams 7'c Davies 8'm Con: Davies (2/3) 2', 7'		Try: Popelin 13'; Con: Bouhraoua (1/1) 13'	Referee: (Fiji) Tevita Rokovereni

7 April 2018	United States	31–17	Argentina	Hong Kong Stadium
15:38	Try: Baker 1'c Barrett 3'm, 6'c, 8'm Iosefo 11'c Con: Niua (2/4) 1', 7'; Tomasin (1/1) 11'		Try: Etchart 4'm Bazan Velez 12'm del Mestre 13'c Con: del Mestre (1/1) 13'; Revol (0/1); Bazan Velez (0/1)	Referee: (New Zealand) Richard Kelly

=== Knockout stage ===
==== 13th place ====
Semi-finals
8 April 2018 – 13:16 – Hong Kong Stadium
Samoa	33
England	10
8 April 2018 – 13:43 – Hong Kong Stadium
Wales	49
South Korea	5

13th place final
8 April 2018 – 17:00 – Hong Kong Stadium
Samoa	5
Wales	33

Matches

Semi-finals

8 April 2018	Samoa	33–10	England	Hong Kong Stadium
13:16	Try: Tuatagaloa 3'c, 7'c Alosio 4'c Fomai 8'; Leilual 13'c Con: Alosio (1/1) 3'; Mealoi (3/3) 4', 7', 8', 14'		Try: Olowofela 10'm Kerr 12'm Con: Edwards (0/2)	Referee: (Hong Kong) Matthew Rodden

8 April 2018	Wales	49–5	South Korea	Hong Kong Stadium
13:43	Try: Jenkins 1'c Bagshaw 2'c, 7'c Lewis 6'c, 9'c Williams 13'c Treharne 14'c Con: Jones (7/7) 1', 3', 6', 7', 9', 13', 14'		Try: Jang 4'm Con: Lee (0/1)	Referee: (Argentina) Damián Schneider

13th place final

8 April 2018	Samoa	5–33	Wales	Hong Kong Stadium
17:00	Try: Tuatagaloa 1'm Con: Mealoi (0/1)		Try: Devine 5'c Bagshaw 7'm, 10'c Lewis 7'c Jenkins 14'c Con: Jones (2/3) 5', 7'; Treharne (2/2) 11', 14'	Referee: (Argentina) Damián Schneider

==== Challenge Trophy ====
Quarter-finals
8 April 2018 – 9:30 – Hong Kong Stadium
Samoa	0
France	38
8 April 2018 – 9:52 – Hong Kong Stadium
England	14
Australia	17
8 April 2018 – 10:14 – Hong Kong Stadium
Wales	7
Russia	15
8 April 2018 – 10:36 – Hong Kong Stadium
Canada	45
South Korea	0

Semi-finals
8 April 2018 – 14:05 – Hong Kong Stadium
France	24
Australia	12
8 April 2018 – 14:30 – Hong Kong Stadium
Russia	12
Canada	19

Challenge Trophy final
8 April 2018 – 17:30 – Hong Kong Stadium
France	33
Canada	7

Matches

Quarter-finals

8 April 2018	Samoa	0–38	France	Hong Kong Stadium
9:30			Try: Popelin 3'm Barraque 5'c Lakafia 7'c, 14'c Huyard 9'm Alerte 13'c Con: Popelin (1/1) 5'; Barraque (3/5) 7', 14', 14'	Referee: (Fiji) Tevita Rokovereni

8 April 2018	England	14–17	Australia	Hong Kong Stadium
9:52	Try: Olowofela 1'c Edwards 7'c Con: Edwards (2/2) 2', 7'		Try: Skelton 3'm Goddard 4'c Figg 14'm Con: Goddard (1/2) 5'; Figg (0/1)	Referee: (Argentina) Damián Schneider

8 April 2018	Wales	7–15	Russia	Hong Kong Stadium
10:14	Try: Devine 7'c Con: Davies (1/1) 7'		Try: Davydov 4'; Sozonov 6'm Babaev 8'm Con: Sukhin (0/1); Solomyannyy (0/1)	Referee: (United States) Mike O'Brien

8 April 2018	Canada	45–0	South Korea	Hong Kong Stadium
10:36	Try: Douglas 2'c, 13'c Braid 5'c Jones 7'm Campbell 8'm, 14'c Kaay 11'c Con: Hirayama (5/7) 2', 5', 11', 13', 14'; Cards: Braid (yellow card) 7' to 9'			Referee: (Japan) Nori Hashimoto

Semi-finals

8 April 2018	France	24–12	Australia	Hong Kong Stadium
14:05	Try: Veredamu 3'c, 10'c Dall'igna 6'm Alerte 13'm Con: Barraque (2/3) 4', 11'		Try: Armstrong 1'c Pietsch 4'm Con: Goddard (1/2) 2'	Referee: (Japan) Nori Hashimoto

8 April 2018	Russia	12–19	Canada	Hong Kong Stadium
14:30	Try: Babaev 2'; Sozonov 7'c Con: Solomyannyy (1/1) 7'; Gostyuzhev (0/1)		Try: Douglas 5'm Kay 7'c Cejvanovic 13'c Con: Hirayama (2/3) 8', 13'; Cards: Jones (yellow card) 10' to 12'	Referee: (New Zealand) James Doleman

Challenge Trophy final

8 April 2018	France	33–7	Canada	Hong Kong Stadium
17:30	Try: Lakafia 0'c Dall'igna 2'c Popelin 4'c Con: Barraque (1/1) 1'; Riva (1/1) 2', 5'; Cards: Mazoue (yellow card) 3' to 5'		Try: Braid 6'c Con: Hirayama (1/1) 6'	Referee: (Fiji) Tevita Rokovereni

==== 5th place ====
Semi-finals
8 April 2018 – 14:55 – Hong Kong Stadium
Argentina	14
Spain	12
8 April 2018 – 15:17 – Hong Kong Stadium
United States	19
Scotland	15

5th place final
8 April 2018 – 18:00 – Hong Kong Stadium
Argentina	14
United States	12

Matches

Semi-finals

8 April 2018	Argentina	14–12	Spain	Hong Kong Stadium
14:55	Try: Etchart 7'c Revol 11'c Con: Revol (2/2) 7', 11'		Try: Rodriguez 4'c Sainz-Trapaga 14'm Con: Genua (1/1) 4'; Hernandez (0/1)	Referee: (Australia) Jordan Way

8 April 2018	United States	19–15	Scotland	Hong Kong Stadium
15:17	Try: Leuta 2'm Isles 5'c Tomasin 10'c Con: Tomasin (2/2) 6', 10'; Niua (0/1)		Try: Graham 12'm McFarland 13'm Horne 14'm Con: Horne (0/3)	Referee: (England) Richard Haughton

5th place final

8 April 2018	Argentina	14–12	United States	Hong Kong Stadium
18:00	Try: Osadczuk 2'c Alvarez 4'c Con: Revol (2/2) 2', 4'; Cards: Schultz (yellow card) 13' to 14'		Try: Isles 6'm, 12'c Con: Tomasin (1/2) 12'	Referee: (Australia) Jordan Way

==== Cup ====
Quarter-finals
8 April 2018 – 10:58 – Hong Kong Stadium
Fiji	40
Argentina	14
8 April 2018 – 11:20 – Hong Kong Stadium
South Africa	38
Spain	5
8 April 2018 – 11:42 – Hong Kong Stadium
United States	7
New Zealand	35
8 April 2018 – 12:07 – Hong Kong Stadium
Kenya	19
Scotland	12

Cup final
8 April 2018 – 15:41 – Hong Kong Stadium
Fiji	26
South Africa	24
8 April 2018 – 16:03 – Hong Kong Stadium
New Zealand	12
Kenya	21

Final
8 April 2018 – 19:00 – Hong Kong Stadium
Fiji	24
Kenya	12
Bronze Final
8 April 2018 – 18:30 – Hong Kong Stadium
South Africa	24
New Zealand	7

Matches

Quarter-finals

8 April 2018	Fiji	40–14	Argentina	Hong Kong Stadium
10:58	Try: Nasagavesi 1'c Kunatani 3'c Ravouvou 6'm Tuwai 9'c Nasilasila 11'c Naduva 13'; Con: Ravouvou (2/3) 1', 3'; Nasilasila (2/2) 10', 12'; Cards: Tuwai (yellow card) 7' to 9'		Try: Barbier 8'c Revol 14'c Con: Revol (2/2) 8', 14'	Referee: (New Zealand) Richard Kelly

8 April 2018	South Africa	38–5	Spain	Hong Kong Stadium
11:20	Try: du Plessis 1', 7'c, 8'm Human 5'c Penalty Try 11'; S Davids 13'c Con: S Davids (1/1) 6'; Human (1/2) 7'; Smith (1/1) 13'; Cards: Oosthuizen (yellow card) 3' to 5'; Bezuidenhout (yellow card) 7' to 9'		Try: Pla 4'm Con: Hernandez (0/1); Cards: Poggi (yellow card) 11' to 13'	Referee: (New Zealand) James Doleman

8 April 2018	United States	7–35	New Zealand	Hong Kong Stadium
11:42	Try: Isles 12'c Con: Tomasin (1/1) 13'		Try: Rokolisoa 1'c, 9'c Ravouvou 5'c Masirewa 6'c Rayasi 14'c Con: Khan (5/5) 1', 5', 7', 10', 14'	Referee: (Scotland) Sam Grove-White

8 April 2018	Kenya	19–12	Scotland	Hong Kong Stadium
12:07	Try: Ambaka 2'c Ouma 7'm Oluoch 14'c Con: Oliech (2/3) 3', 14'		Try: Farndale 5'c, 8'm Con: Jackson (1/2) 5'	Referee: (Australia) Jordan Way

Semi-finals

8 April 2018	Fiji	26–24	South Africa	Hong Kong Stadium
15:41	Try: Nasoko 3'm Nasagavesi 8'c Nasilasila 10'c, 12'c Con: Nasilasila (3/3) 8', 10', 12'; Ravouvou (0/1)		Try: S Davids 0'c, 6'm, 7'c du Plessis 13'm Con: S Davids (2/4) 0', 7'	Referee: (Australia) Damon Murphy

8 April 2018	New Zealand	12–21	Kenya	Hong Kong Stadium
16:03	Try: Nicole 0'c Nareki 14'm Con: Khan (1/2) 0'		Try: Injera 2'c, 7'c Ambaka 13'c Con: Oliech (3/3) 2', 7', 13'	Referee: (Hong Kong) Matthew Rodden

Bronze Final

8 April 2018	South Africa	29–7	New Zealand	Hong Kong Stadium
18:30	Try: Gans 1'c, 5'm Human 6'm Z Davids 11'c du Plessis 14'm Con: S Davids (2/4) 1', 11'; Smith (0/1)		Try: Ng Shiu 7'c Con: Khan (1/1) 7'	Referee: (Scotland) Sam Grove-White

Cup final

8 April 2018	Fiji	24–12	Kenya	Hong Kong Stadium
19:00	Try: Vakurunabili 1'm Sau 7'm Nasilasila 10'c Ravouvou 15'c Con: Nasilasila (2/4) 10', 15'		Try: Odhiambo 11'm Ouma 19'c Con: Oliech (1/2) 20'; Cards: Injera (yellow card) 6' to 8'; Ambaka (yellow card) 7' to 9'	Referee: (Australia) Damon Murphy

=== Tournament placings ===
Place	Team	Points
1st place, gold medalist(s)	Fiji	22
2nd place, silver medalist(s)	Kenya	19
3rd place, bronze medalist(s)	South Africa	17
4	New Zealand	15
5	Argentina	13
6	United States	12
7	Scotland	10
7	Spain	10

Place	Team	Points
9	France	8
10	Canada	7
11	Australia	5
11	Russia	5
13	Wales	3
14	Samoa	2
15	England	1
15	South Korea	1

Source: World Rugby

=== Players ===
==== Scoring leaders ====
Tries scored
Rank	Player	Tries
1	(United States) Carlin Isles	7
	(South Africa) Muller du Plessis	7
	(South Africa) Selvyn Davids	7
4	(Fiji) Amenoni Nasilasila	6
5	(Scotland) George Horne	5

Points scored
Rank	Player	Points
1	(Fiji) Amenoni Nasilasila	60
2	(South Africa) Selvyn Davids	55
3	(United States) Carlin Isles	35
	(South Africa) Muller du Plessis	35
5	(Argentina) Gastón Revol	34

Source: World Rugby

==== Dream team ====
The following seven players were selected to the tournament dream team at the conclusion of the tournament:

Forwards	Backs
(Fiji) Kalione Nasoko (Kenya) Oscar Ouma (Fiji) Semi Kunatani	(Kenya) Willy Ambaka (South Africa) Selvyn Davids (Fiji) Eroni Sau (Fiji) Amenoni Nasilasila

== World Series qualifier ==
=== Continental qualifying ===
Teams will qualify for the World Series Qualifier tournament based on continental championships. The top teams from each continent that are not already core teams will qualify. For the 2018 edition, Europe has been given a third spot, whereas North America was given a single spot. The other continents remain with two spots each.

Continental sevens championship	Dates	Venue(s)	Berths	Qualified
2017 Rugby Europe Sevens Grand Prix Series	3 June– 16 July 2017	(Russia) Moscow, (Poland) Łódź, (France) Clermont-Ferrand (England) Exeter	3	Ireland; Germany; Georgia
2017 Asia Rugby Sevens Series	1 September– 14 October 2017	Hong Kong, (South Korea) Incheon, (Sri Lanka) Colombo	2	Japan; Hong Kong
2017 Africa Cup Sevens	6–7 October 2017	(Uganda) Kampala	2	Uganda; Zimbabwe
2017 Oceania Sevens Championship	10–11 November 2017	(Fiji) Suva	2	Papua New Guinea; Cook Islands
2017 RAN Sevens	25–26; November 2017	Mexico City	1	Jamaica
2018 Sudamérica Rugby Sevens	6–14; January 2018	(Uruguay) Punta del Este, (Chile) Viña del Mar	2	Uruguay; Chile
Total			12	

=== Format ===
The qualifying tournament features twelve teams divided into three pools of four teams each. Each team plays all the others in their pool once. The top eight teams (the top two from each group, plus the two best third-place finishers) qualify to the quarterfinals of the knockout round. The winner of the knockout round will be given core status in the 2018–19 World Series.

=== Pool stage ===
All times in Hong Kong Time (UTC+08:00). The games as scheduled are as follows:

==== Pool E ====
Pos	Team	Pld	W	D	L	PF	PA	PD	Pts
1	Chile	3	2	0	1	58	29	+29	7
2	Japan	3	2	0	1	60	39	+21	7
3	Uganda	3	2	0	1	50	44	+6	7
4	Georgia	3	0	0	3	25	81	−56	3

6 April 2018	Uganda	14–10	Chile	Hong Kong Stadium
12:42	Try: Wokorach 4'c Okia 9'c Con: Wokorach (1/1) 4', 9'		Try: De Vidts 1'm Urroz 7'm Con: Torrealba (0/2)	Referee: (Australia) Jordan Way

6 April 2018	Japan	26–10	Georgia	Hong Kong Stadium
13:04	Try: Ozawa 2'c Seru 4'c Sakai 6'c Lisala 14'm Con: Sakai (3/3) 3', 4', 6'; Hashino (0/1); Cards: Soejima (yellow card) 6' to 8'		Try: Aptsiauri 7'm, 10'm Con: Gogolashvili (0/2)	Referee: (New Zealand) James Doleman

6 April 2018	Uganda	26–10	Georgia	Hong Kong Stadium
15:40	Try: Wokorach 6'c, 10'c, 12'c Okia 7'm Con: Magomu (3/3) 6', 11', 12'; Wokorach (0/1)		Try: Spanderashvili 8'm Kveseladze 14'm Con: Svanidze (0/1); Gogoladze (0/1); Cards: Kveseladze (yellow card) 9' to 11'	Referee: (Argentina) Damián Schneider

6 April 2018	Japan	10–19	Chile	Hong Kong Stadium
16:02	Try: Goya 1'm Lilidamu 10'm Con: Sakai (0/2)		Try: Urroz 3'm De Vidts 7'c Torrealba 12'c Con: Torrealba (2/3) 7', 13'	Referee: (Fiji) Tevita Rokovereni

7 April 2018	Chile	29–5	Georgia	Hong Kong Stadium
9:44	Try: Fernandez 1'c, 8'c Silva 2'm De Vidts 6'm Westcott 13'm Con: Torrealba (2/5) 1', 8'		Try: Mchedlishvili 10'm Con: Gogolashvili (0/1)	Referee: (Japan) Nori Hashimoto

7 April 2018	Japan	24–10	Uganda	Hong Kong Stadium
10:06	Try: Goya 1'c Naikabula 9'm Lilidamu 12'm Lisala 14'c Con: Sakai (2/4) 1', 14'		Try: Sebuliba 4'm Wokorach 6'm Con: Wokorach (0/1); Ofoyrwoth (0/1); Cards: Wokorach (yellow card) 10' to 12'	Referee: (Australia) Jordan Way

==== Pool F ====
Pos	Team	Pld	W	D	L	PF	PA	PD	Pts
1	Germany	3	3	0	0	77	26	+51	9
2	Hong Kong	3	1	0	2	52	50	+2	5
3	Zimbabwe	3	1	0	2	35	51	−16	5
4	Papua New Guinea	3	1	0	2	39	74	−35	5

6 April 2018	Germany	14–12	Hong Kong	Hong Kong Stadium
13:26	Try: Himmer 4'c Dieckmann 6'; Con: Heimpel (2/2) 5', 6'		Try: Yiu 1'm Hood 10'c Con: Rimene (1/2) 10'	Referee: (Scotland) Sam Grove-White

6 April 2018	Papua New Guinea	10–17	Zimbabwe	Hong Kong Stadium
13:48	Try: Vali 3'm Mocke 12'm Con: Guise (0/2); Cards: Mocke (yellow card) 0' to 2'		Try: Chibuwe 5'c Chitokwindo 8'm Hunduza 14'm Con: Rouse (1/2) 6'; Mudariki (0/1)	Referee: (New Zealand) Richard Kelly

6 April 2018	Germany	27–7	Zimbabwe	Hong Kong Stadium
16:28	Try: Dawe 6'm Lichtenberg 7'm Hohl 8'c Rox 12'm Himmer 14'm Con: Heimpel (2/3) 8'; Himmer (0/2)		Try: Bryden 1'c Con: Rouse (1/1) 1'; Cards: Tshamala (yellow card) 7' to 9'	Referee: (Hong Kong) Matthew Rodden

6 April 2018	Papua New Guinea	22–21	Hong Kong	Hong Kong Stadium
16:50	Try: Vali 1'm Kalua 6'm Kapana 7'm Clement 14'c Con: Clement (1/1) 14'; Guise (0/3); Cards: Mocke (yellow card) 3' to 5'; Kalua (yellow card) 11' to 13'		Try: Yiu 5'c Lee 8'c Coverdale 12'c Con: Rimene (1/1) 6', 8', 13'	Referee: (United States) Mike O'Brien

7 April 2018	Hong Kong	19–14	Zimbabwe	Hong Kong Stadium
10:28	Try: Rimene 2'c Boucaut 3'm Coverdale 14'm Con: Rimene (1/2) 3'; Webb (0/1); Cards: Neville (yellow card) 9' to 11'		Try: Nechironga 10'c Chitokwindo 12'c Con: Tambiwera (1/1) 10', 12'	Referee: (New Zealand) James Doleman

7 April 2018	Papua New Guinea	7–36	Germany	Hong Kong Stadium
10:50	Try: Kapana 9'c Con: Guise (1/1) 9'; Cards: Kalua (yellow card) 12' to 14'		Try: Dieckmann 1'm, 6'm, 7'c Brechenmacher 2'm Soteras-Merz 4'c Rix 14'c Con: Heimpel (3/6) 5', 7', 14'	Referee: (Argentina) Damián Schneider

==== Pool G ====
Pos	Team	Pld	W	D	L	PF	PA	PD	Pts
1	Ireland	3	3	0	0	103	5	+98	9
2	Uruguay	3	2	0	1	60	41	+19	7
3	Jamaica	3	1	0	2	26	67	−41	5
4	Cook Islands	3	0	0	3	24	100	−76	3

6 April 2018	Uruguay	22–5	Jamaica	Hong Kong Stadium
11:58	Try: Etcheverry 2'm, 4'm Della Corte 8'm Arata 14'c Con: Favaro (1/1) 14'; Lijtenstein (0/3)		Try: Caven 12'm Con: Segree (0/1)	Referee: (United States) Mike O'Brien

6 April 2018	Ireland	41–5	Cook Islands	Hong Kong Stadium
12:20	Try: O'Brien 3'm, 10'c Fitzpatrick 4'c, 14'c Roche 6'm Kennedy 7'm, 8'm Con: Roche (1/5) 4'; Dardis (2/2) 11', 14'; Cards: Daly (yellow card) 12' to 14'		Try: Kiria 13'm Con: Napara (0/1)	Referee: (Australia) Damon Murphy

6 April 2018	Uruguay	38–0	Cook Islands	Hong Kong Stadium
14:56	Try: Etcheverry 1'c, 11'c, 13'm Garcia 6'c Garcia 10'm Plottier 14'c Con: Etcheverry (2/2) 2', 7'; Lijtenstein (2/4) Lijtenstein 12', 14'			Referee: (Japan) Nori Hashimoto

6 April 2018	Ireland	26–0	Jamaica	Hong Kong Stadium
15:18	Try: O'Brien 1'c Kennedy 5'm McNulty 8'c Daly 12'c Con: Roche (3/4) 2', 9', 12'		Cards: Fessel (yellow card) 5' to 7'	Referee: (England) Richard Haughton

7 April 2018	Jamaica	21–19	Cook Islands	Hong Kong Stadium
9:00	Try: Dixon 3'c Fessel 7'c Christie 12'c Con: Segree (1/1) 3'; Eddie (2/2) 9', 12'		Try: Napara 2'm Leuta 6'c Paerau 10'c Con: Leuta (1/2) 7'; Napara (1/1) 10'; Cards: Willis (yellow card) 7' to 9'	Referee: (United States) Mike O'Brien

7 April 2018	Ireland	36–0	Uruguay	Hong Kong Stadium
9:22	Try: Fitzpatrick 4'm O'Brien 6'c Kennedy 8'm Keenan 11'm McNulty 12'c Daly 14'c Con: Rochie (1/3) 7' Dardis (2/3) 12', 14'		Cards: Puig (yellow card) 4' to 6'	Referee: (Hong Kong) Matthew Rodden

==== Third place tiebreaker ====
Pos	Team	Pld	W	D	L	PF	PA	PD	Pts
1	Uganda	3	2	0	1	50	44	+6	7
2	Zimbabwe	3	1	0	2	35	51	−16	5
3	Jamaica	3	1	0	2	26	67	−41	5

=== Knockout stage ===
Quarter-finals
7 April 2018 – 18:18 – Hong Kong Stadium
Germany	26
Uganda	0
7 April 2018 – 18:42 – Hong Kong Stadium
Chile	24
Hong Kong	12
7 April 2018 – 19:04 – Hong Kong Stadium
Japan	26
Uruguay	19
7 April 2018 – 19:26 – Hong Kong Stadium
Ireland	38
Zimbabwe	5

Semi-finals
8 April 2018 – 12:32 – Hong Kong Stadium
Germany	19
Chile	12
8 April 2018 – 12:54 – Hong Kong Stadium
Japan	12
Ireland	7

Final – World Series qualifier
8 April 2018 – 16:30 – Hong Kong Stadium
Germany	14
Japan	19

Matches

Quarter-finals

7 April 2018	Germany	26–0	Uganda	Hong Kong Stadium
18:18	Try: Fromm 1'm Lichtenberg 4'c Dieckmann 8'c, 14'c Con: Heimpel (3/4) 4', 9', 14'			Referee: (Fiji) Tevita Rokovereni

7 April 2018	Chile	24–12	Hong Kong	Hong Kong Stadium
18:42	Try: De Vidts 2'm, 7'm Fernandez 8'c Metuaze 12'c Con: Torrealba (2/4) 8', 12'		Try: Boucaut 5'c Denmark 14'm Con: Rimene (1/1) 6'; Webb (0/1)	Referee: (Australia) Damon Murphy

7 April 2018	Japan	26–19	Uruguay	Hong Kong Stadium
19:04	Try: Lisala 1'm Sakai 6'c Seru 8'c Lilidamu 9'c Con: Sakai (3/4) 7', 8', 9'		Try: Arata 2'c Plottier 11'c Ardao 14'; Con: Lijtenstein (1/1) 3'; Etcheverry (1/1) 14'	Referee: (New Zealand) Richard Kelly

7 April 2018	Ireland	38–5	Zimbabwe	Hong Kong Stadium
19:26	Try: O'Donnell 1'm Kennan 2'c Fitzpatrick 5'c Daly 7'c Kennedy 12'c Mollen 14'm Con: Roche (3/4) 3', 5', 7'; Dardis (1/2) 12'; Cards: Mollen (yellow card) 10' to 12'		Try: Mudariki 9'm Con: Mudariki (0/1)	Referee: (Australia) Jordan Way

Semi-finals

8 April 2018	Germany	19–12	Chile	Hong Kong Stadium
12:32	Try: Fromm 2'm Himmer 9'c Dieckmann 12'c Con: Heimpel (2/3) 9', 13'		Try: De Vidts 4'm Verschae 14'c Con: Torrealba (1/2) 14'	Referee: (England) Richard Haughton

8 April 2018	Japan	12–7	Ireland	Hong Kong Stadium
12:54	Try: Hashino 8'c Soejima 14'; Con: Sakai (1/1) 8'		Try: Roche 13'c Con: Roche (1/1) 13'	Referee: (Australia) Damon Murphy

Final – World Series qualifier

8 April 2018	Germany	14–19	Japan	Hong Kong Stadium
16:30	Try: Dawe 3'm Himmer 7'c Con: Heimpel (2/2) 4', 8'		Try: Lisala 1'm, 14'c Nakano 8'c Con: Sakai (2/3) 9', 14'	Referee: (New Zealand) Richard Kelly

=== Overall record ===
Pos	Team	Wn/Ls	Pts Dif
1	Japan	5–1	+38
2	Germany	5–1	+79
3	Ireland	4–1	+126
4	Chile	3–2	+36
5	Uruguay	2–2	+12
6	Uganda	2–2	–20
7	Hong Kong	1–3	–10
8	Zimbabwe	1–3	–49

== See also ==
- 2018 Hong Kong Women's Sevens
- 2018 Rugby World Cup Sevens – Men's tournament

World Sevens Series XIX
Preceded by 2018 Canada Sevens	2018 Hong Kong Sevens	Succeeded by 2018 Singapore Sevens
Hong Kong Sevens
Preceded by 2017 Hong Kong Sevens	2018 Hong Kong Sevens	Succeeded by 2019 Hong Kong Sevens
