= 2018 Rugby World Cup Sevens qualifying – Men =

This is the qualifications of the 2018 Rugby World Cup Sevens aimed at selecting men's rugby sevens national teams that appeared in the finals in San Francisco. A total of 55 nations took part in the qualifying process.

== General ==
The tournament is organized by World Rugby to be held on 20–22 July 2018, with twenty-four teams in attendance. Automatic qualification is extended to the host and the eight quarterfinalists of the previous World Cup. Four more teams qualified based on placement in the 2016-17 World Rugby Sevens Series, and the remainder are to be decided in each of the six regions' respective tournaments.

== Qualified teams ==
| Africa | North America | South America | Asia | Europe | Oceania |
Automatic qualification
| Kenya; South Africa | United States | | | England; France; Wales | Australia; Fiji; New Zealand |
2016–17 World Series
| | Canada | Argentina | | Scotland | Samoa |
Regional Qualifiers
| Uganda; Zimbabwe | Jamaica | Chile; Uruguay | Hong Kong; Japan | Ireland; Russia | Papua New Guinea; Tonga |

== Qualifying ==
Legend
Qualified to 2018 Rugby World Cup Sevens
Already qualified

=== Africa ===
Ten teams competed in Rugby Africa's Sevens tournament on 6–7 October 2017 in Kampala, Uganda, and contested the two qualifying slots. By making it to the finals then winning, Uganda makes its first ever World Cup appearance.

| Rank | Team |
|---|---|
| 1st place, gold medalist(s) | Uganda |
| 2nd place, silver medalist(s) | Zimbabwe |
| 3rd place, bronze medalist(s) | Madagascar |
| 4 | Zambia |
| 5 | Tunisia |
| 6 | Senegal |
| 7 | Morocco |
| 8 | Botswana |
| 9 | Ghana |
| 10 | Mauritius |

=== North America ===
The qualifying tournament, which is also Rugby Americas North Sevens, took place at the Campo Marte in Mexico City, 25–26 November 2017. Jamaica won the tournament to make its first World Cup appearance.

| Rank | Team |
|---|---|
| 1st place, gold medalist(s) | Jamaica |
| 2nd place, silver medalist(s) | Guyana |
| 3rd place, bronze medalist(s) | Mexico |
| 4 | Trinidad and Tobago |
| 5 | Cayman Islands |
| 6 | Bermuda |
| 7 | Barbados |
| 8 | Dominican Republic |
| 9 | British Virgin Islands |
| 10 | Curaçao |

=== South America ===
The 2017 Bolivarian Games rugby sevens tournament on 19–21 November served as the first part of the South American qualification process. Silver-winning Paraguay advanced to the 2018 Sudamérica Rugby Sevens, where from 6–14 January they compete alongside Brazil, Chile, Colombia, Uruguay and some invitational teams. After the two tournaments, respective third and fourth-place finishers Uruguay and Chile qualified.

=== Asia ===
From 1 September to 14 October, eight teams competed in Hong Kong, Incheon and Colombo for two World Cup slots. Japan and Hong Kong respectively rounded up the top two teams, making them eligible for the World Cup.

| Rank | Team | Hong Kong | Incheon | Colombo | Points |
|---|---|---|---|---|---|
| 1st place, gold medalist(s) | Japan | 12 | 10 | 10 | 32 |
| 2nd place, silver medalist(s) | Hong Kong | 10 | 8 | 12 | 30 |
| 3rd place, bronze medalist(s) | South Korea | 8 | 12 | 7 | 27 |
| 4 | Sri Lanka | 5 | 5 | 8 | 18 |
| 5 | China | 7 | 7 | 2 | 16 |
| 6 | Philippines | 4 | 2 | 5 | 11 |
| 7 | Malaysia | 2 | 4 | 4 | 10 |
| 8 | Chinese Taipei | 1 | 1 | 1 | 3 |

=== Europe ===
From 4 June to 16 July 2017, twelve teams competed at the Sevens Grand Prix in Moscow, Łódź, Clermont-Ferrand and Exeter, of which nine contested two World Cup spots with England, France and Wales already automatically qualified.

| Rank | Team | Moscow | Łódź | Clermont-Ferrand | Exeter | Points |
|---|---|---|---|---|---|---|
| 1st place, gold medalist(s) | Russia | 16 | 20 | 18 | 20 | 74 |
| 2nd place, silver medalist(s) | Ireland | 20 | 16 | 20 | 16 | 72 |
| 3rd place, bronze medalist(s) | Spain | 18 | 18 | 16 | 6 | 58 |
| 4 | Wales | 3 | 14 | 12 | 18 | 47 |
| 5 | Germany | 8 | 12 | 14 | 8 | 42 |
| 6 | France | 12 | 8 | 10 | 4 | 34 |
| 7 | Georgia | 6 | 6 | 6 | 12 | 30 |
| 8 | Portugal | 10 | 2 | 1 | 14 | 27 |
| 9 | England | 4 | 10 | 3 | 10 | 27 |
| 10 | Italy | 14 | 4 | 4 | 3 | 22 |
| 11 | Belgium | 2 | 3 | 8 | 2 | 15 |
| 12 | Poland | 1 | 1 | 2 | 1 | 5 |

=== Oceania ===
Thirteen teams competed on 10–11 November 2017 in Suva, Fiji, of which nine teams sought one of the two allotted World Cup slots based upon their placement with Australia, Fiji, New Zealand and Samoa already qualified. With Papua New Guinea claiming that slot, the second continental slot was awarded to the champion of the 2017 Pacific Mini Games tournament on 8–9 December. Through edging out Solomon Islands for the Bronze Medal, only behind Fiji and Samoa, Tonga qualified.

Oceania Sevens
| Rank | Team |
| 1st place, gold medalist(s) | Fiji |
| 2nd place, silver medalist(s) | New Zealand |
| 3rd place, bronze medalist(s) | Australia; Samoa |
| 5 | Papua New Guinea |
| 6 | Cook Islands |
| 7 | American Samoa; Tonga |
| 9 | New Caledonia; Solomon Islands |
| 11 | Nauru; Vanuatu |
| 13 | Tuvalu |

Pacific Mini Games
| Rank | Team |
| 1st place, gold medalist(s) | Samoa |
| 2nd place, silver medalist(s) | Fiji |
| 3rd place, bronze medalist(s) | Tonga |
| 4 | Solomon Islands |
| 5 | New Caledonia |
| 6 | Nauru |
| 7 | Vanuatu |
| 8 | Niue |
| 9 | Wallis and Futuna |
| 10 | Tuvalu |
