= Jordan Conroy =

Irish rugby union player (born 1994)

- Born: 10 March 1994 (age 32) Tullamore, Ireland
- Height: 1.83 m (6 ft 0 in)
- Weight: 92 kg (203 lb)
- University: Athlone Institute of Technology

Rugby union career
- Position: Wing
- Current team: Connacht
Amateur team(s)
Years	Team	Apps	(Points)
2015–2016	Tullamore		
2016–	Buccaneers		
Senior career
Years	Team	Apps	(Points)
2017–	Connacht	0	(0)
2025–	Delhi Redz		
National sevens team
Years	Team		Comps
2016–2025	Ireland 7s		21
Medal record
Men's rugby sevens
Representing Ireland
European Games
Gold medal – first place	2023 Kraków–Małopolska	Team competition

Jordan Conroy (born 10 March 1994) is an Irish rugby union player. He is a specialist sevens player who plays for the Ireland national rugby sevens team, and has represented Ireland in the 2020 Summer Olympics and plays his XV's club rugby with the Buccaneers RFC as a wing.

== Club rugby ==
Conroy took up rugby relatively late, at the age of 18, after having dabbled in athletics and soccer. Conroy played his club rugby for Tullamore in Division 2C of the All-Ireland League in the 2015-16 season, where he scored the fastest try in league history.

Conroy played the 2016-17 season with Buccaneers RFC in Division 1-B of the All-Ireland League, scoring 18 tries during the season, and helping the club gain promotion to Division 1-A for the 2017-18 season. Conroy was named the 2016-17 Connacht Club Player of the Year, and Division 1-B player of the year. Conroy also played for the Connacht Eagles in the British and Irish Cup.

== Ireland sevens team ==
Conroy appeared with the Ireland national rugby sevens team in 2016 at the Amsterdam 7s and Newcastle 7s tournaments. Conroy played for Ireland during the Rugby Europe 2017 Sevens Grand Prix Series. He played in the 2017 Moscow Sevens tournament, where his contributions in both attack and defence were noted. At the 2017 Lodz Sevens, Conroy was Ireland's leading try-scorer with six tries, scoring a try in each match. At the 2017 Clermont-Ferrand Sevens, Conroy was noted for his outstanding performance, scoring in the semifinal against Spain and scoring twice in the 17-14 win against Russia in the final to win the tournament. Conroy scored six tries at the 2017 Exeter Sevens and received the Player of the Tournament award, beating out Ireland teammate Harry McNulty.

Conroy missed the 2018 Hong Kong Sevens, but returned for the 2018 Grand Prix Sevens. In the first Grand Prix tournament, the 2018 Moscow Sevens, Conroy scored eight tries during the tournament, including four in the semifinal against France. Conroy drew significant attention for his performance in the 2018 London Sevens, where he scored eight tries during the tournament. His three tries in Ireland’s 21—19 victory over England helped Ireland achieve a third place finish. He was selected to the tournament Dream Team at the conclusion of the tournament.

At the 2019 Hong Kong Sevens qualifier for the 2019–20 season, Conroy led all try scorers with 10 tries in the tournament, earning the Player of the Tournament award. His try-scoring included a hat-trick in pool play against Russia, and two key tries in a tight 19–10 come-from-behind win in the semifinal against Germany. Conroy began the 2019-20 World Series at the 2019 Dubai Sevens where he led all players with seven tries (including five in one match) and made the tournament Dream Team.

In 2022, He competed for Ireland at the Rugby World Cup Sevens in Cape Town. He competed for Ireland at the 2024 Summer Olympics in Paris. He was replaced before his sides final game of the men’s tournament after sustaining an injury.

In 2025 it was confirmed he would compete for Rugby Premier League side Delhi Redz for the inaugural season of the league in India

== Media appearances ==
In 2021, Conroy appeared on the RTÉ Two dating show, Celebrity Pulling with My Parents.

In 2022, Conroy appeared on the fifth series of the Irish version of Dancing With the Stars, alongside Georgian ballroom and Latin dancer Salome Chachua. Conroy and Chachua reached the finals, finishing in second place behind Nina Carberry & Pasquale La Rocca, and alongside Ellen Keane & Stephen Vincent and Erica-Cody & Denys Samson.

== See also ==
- All-Ireland League
