= France Sevens =

International rugby sevens tournament

- Most recent season or competition: 2023 France Sevens
- Sport: Rugby sevens
- First season: 1995
- No. of teams: 16
- Most recent champion: New Zealand
- Most titles: South Africa (3 titles) New Zealand (3 titles)

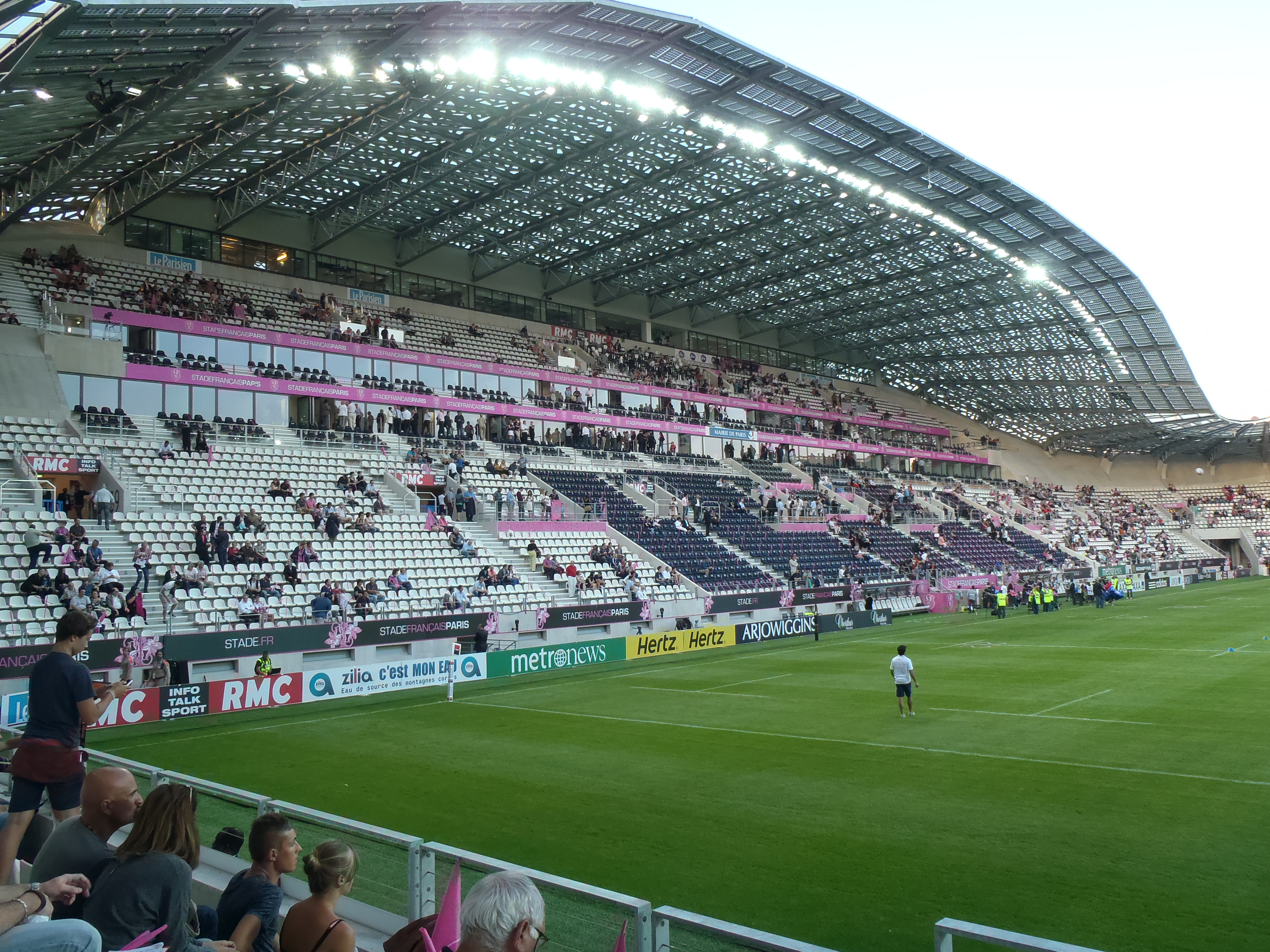
Paris Sevens venue Stade Jean-Bouin.

The France Sevens, also called the Paris Sevens, is an annual international rugby sevens tournament that is one of ten competitions on the annual World Rugby Sevens Series. The France Sevens is generally held in May or June on the weekend following the London Sevens and is the last competition in the Sevens Series. France has also hosted tournaments within the European Sevens Grand Prix Series, often at Lyon.

== History ==
France hosted its first International Sevens tournament at Melun, in the outskirts of Paris, in May 1995.

The 16 team tournament, culminated in a repeat of the pool game between England and France.

Winners of the previous day's clash, a very strong England side captained by Rob Kitchen, took the lead with two tries by player of the tournament Gerry Ainscough, both of which he converted.

Captained by Alain Penaud and including a number of other players with full caps, France recovered and snatched a 21 - 14 victory in the dying minutes of a very high quality game.

From 1996 to 1999 the tournament was known as the Air France Sevens, and in the year 2000 it was part of the inaugural IRB Sevens World Series.

The IRB hosted the tournament at Bordeaux in 2004, before returning to Paris for 2005 and 2006. The event was effectively replaced in the World Sevens Series by the Scotland Sevens at Edinburgh for the 2006-07 season.

Between 2011 and 2015, Lyon hosted a leg of the European circuit, the Sevens Grand Prix Series.

The Sevens World Series returned to France for the 2015–16 season, with the revival of the Paris Sevens tournament in 2016.

== International sevens ==
=== Invitational tournament ===
Year	Venue	Cup final			Placings			Refs
		Winner	Score	Runner-up	Plate	Bowl	Shield	
1996	Sébastien Charléty Paris	Fiji	38–19	France	Romania	Russia	n/a	
1997	Sébastien Charléty Paris	Fiji	13–7	New Zealand	French Barbarians	Germany	n/a	
1998	Sébastien Charléty Paris	Australia	33–26	New Zealand	South; American Barbarians	Japan	n/a	
1999	Sébastien Charléty Paris	New Zealand	36–26	France	French Barbarians	Australia	n/a	

=== World Rugby Sevens Series ===
Year	Venue	Cup final			Placings			Refs
		Winner	Score	Runner-up	Plate	Bowl	Shield	
2000	Sébastien Charléty Paris	New Zealand	69–10	South Africa	Fiji	Samoa	n/a	
	No tournament in the World Series for men's teams played in France from 2001 to 2003							
2004	Chaban-Delmas; Bordeaux	New Zealand	28–19	England	Argentina	France	Spain	
2005	Stade Jean-Bouin; Paris	France	28–19	Fiji	South Africa	Argentina	Canada	
2006	Sébastien Charléty, Paris	South Africa	33–12	Samoa	Fiji	Kenya	Scotland	
	No tournament in the World Series for men's teams played in France from 2007 to 2015							
2016	Stade Jean-Bouin; Paris	Samoa	29–26	Fiji	South Africa	Scotland	Portugal	
		Winner	Score	Runner-up	Third	Fourth	Fifth	
2017	Stade Jean-Bouin; Paris	South Africa	15–5	Scotland	New Zealand	England	United States	
2018	Stade Jean-Bouin; Paris	South Africa	24–14	England	New Zealand	Canada	Fiji	
2019	Stade Jean-Bouin; Paris	Fiji	35–24	New Zealand	South Africa	United States	France	
World Series tournaments planned for Paris were cancelled in 2020 and 2021, due to impacts of the COVID-19 pandemic.
2022	Stade Ernest-Wallon, Toulouse	Fiji	29–17	Ireland	France	Samoa	Argentina	
2023	Stade Ernest-Wallon, Toulouse	New Zealand	24–19	Argentina	France	Canada	Australia	
No tournament in the World Series for men's teams played in France from 2024 to 2025
2026	Stade Atlantique; Bordeaux	TBC	14–5	New Zealand				

== European Grand Prix ==
In most years since 2011, France has hosted a leg of the Sevens Grand Prix Series, a multi-leg competition sponsored by Rugby Europe every summer involving teams from Europe.

Year	Venue	Cup final			Placings			Refs
	Lyon Sevens	Winner	Score	Runner-up	Third	Fourth	Fifth	
2011	Matmut Stadium; Lyon	England	28–14	Spain	France	Portugal	Russia	
2012	Matmut Stadium; Lyon	England	26–14	Portugal	Spain	Wales	Russia	
2013	Matmut Stadium; Lyon	England	33–5	Russia	France	Wales	Portugal	
2014	Matmut Stadium; Lyon	France	40–10	Belgium	Spain	Russia	n/a	
2015	Matmut Stadium; Lyon	France	20–7	Spain	Belgium	Germany	England	
2016	No Grand Prix Series event hosted in France for 2016							
2017	Gabriel Montpied; Clermont	Ireland	17–14	Russia	Spain	Germany	Wales	
2018	Marcoussis	Ireland	49–7	Germany	England	Russia	Portugal	

== See also ==
- France Women's Sevens
