= Toby Fricker =

US international rugby union player

- Full name: Toby Fricker
- Born: 20 July 1995 (age 31) London, England
- Height: 186 cm (6 ft 1 in)
- Weight: 98 kg (216 lb; 15 st 6 lb)
- School: St Dunstan's College
- University: University of Southampton

Rugby union career
- Position: Wing
- Current team: Bristol Bears
Senior career
Years	Team	Apps	(Points)
2017–2019	Ebbw Vale RFC		
2017–2018	→ Dragons (loan)	3	(0)
2019–2023	Bristol Bears	36	(70)
2019–2020	→ Hartpury University (loan)	3	(0)
2023	Northampton Saints (guest)	1	(0)
2023–2024	Ospreys	1	(0)
2024–2025	New England Free Jacks	6	(5)
2024–2025	→ Bristol Bears (loan)	4	(10)
2025	→ Anthem RC (loan)	10	(12)
2025	Bristol Bears	2	(0)
International career
Years	Team	Apps	(Points)
2017	Wales Students		
2023	Barbarians F.C.	1	(0)
2024–2025	United States	10	(15)
National sevens team
Years	Team		Comps
2017	Wales		2
- Correct as of 6 April 2025

Toby Fricker (born 20 July 1995) is a rugby union player, who plays as a winger for Bristol Bears in the Rugby Premiership. He has previously played for the Dragons, the Ospreys, and the New England Free Jacks.

== Club career ==
While playing at Ebbw Vale RFC in 2018 he was named the Welsh Premiership Newcomer of the Year. He featured on 3 occasions for the Dragons in the 2017–18 Anglo Welsh Cup.

He joined the Bristol Bears in 2019 on a two-year contract following a season-ending shoulder injury to Ryan Edwards. His debut came on 20 September 2019 in a Premiership Rugby Cup game against Harlequins. He played for 73 minutes in the 24–12 loss. While at Bristol he featured for Hartpury University on loan.

In August 2023 he featured as a guest player in the Northampton Saints preseason game against Bedford Blues, coming off the bench in a 33–24 loss.

He signed for the Ospreys ahead of the 2023–24 United Rugby Championship season. However, only featured once, a single start against the Hollywoodbets Sharks, before moving state side to join reigning MLR champions the New England Free Jacks. He started in the 2024 Major League Rugby final winning 11–20 against the Seattle Seawolves.

On 8 October 2024, Fricker returned to England to re-sign with Bristol Bears on a three-month deal to provide injury cover in their backline.

He left England to go back to the United States, joining Anthem Rugby Carolina on a season long loan from New England Free Jacks for the 2025 MLR season, his debut coming against Seattle Seawolves in the 7th round of the competition.

On the 15th of October 2025, Fricker rejoined Bristol Bears for a second time, signing a short-term deal as injury cover.

== International career ==
In 2017, Fricker featured for Wales in the Rugby Europe Sevens Grand Prix Series. Playing in the Moscow and Clermont-Ferrand Sevens. He also represented Wales Students.

In August 2023 he was named in the Barbarians F.C. squad for their match against Samoa. He started on the wing in the 28–14 loss.

In June 2024 he was named as a non-travelling reserve for the USA's summer test matches. He qualifies for the United States through his mother who was born in New Orleans. He was named in the USA squad for the 2024 Pacific Nations Cup, his debut coming at full back against Fiji in the semi finals of the competition. He went on to start in the next round of the competition again at fullback, in the bronze final against Samoa he scored the USA's only try of the game in the 6th minute.

== Statistics ==
=== International tries ===
Try	Opposing team	Location	Venue	Competition	Date	Result	Score
1	Samoa	Higashiosaka, Osaka, Japan	Hanazono Rugby Stadium	2024 Pacific Nations Cup	September 21, 2024	Loss	18─13

== Honours ==
=== Wales Sevens ===
- Moscow Sevens Challenge Trophy
  - Runners-up: (1) 2017

=== Bristol Bears ===
- EPCR Challenge Cup
  - Champions: (1) 2019–20

=== New England Free Jacks ===
- Major League Rugby
  - Champions: (1) 2024

=== Individual ===
- Welsh Premiership Newcomer of the Year: (1) 2018
