= 2016 Moscow Sevens =

- Sevens Grand Prix Series VI
- Host nation: Russia
- Date: 4–5 June 2016

Cup
- Champion: Russia
- Runner-up: France University
- Third: Great Britain Lions

Plate
- Winner: Great Britain Royals
- Runner-up: Georgia

Bowl
- Winner: Italy
- Runner-up: Belgium

The 2016 Moscow Sevens is the opening tournament of the 2016 Sevens Grand Prix Series. It was held over the weekend of 4–5 June 2016.

== Teams ==
12 teams participated in the tournament. In preparation for the 2016 Olympics, instead of England, Scotland, and Wales fielding individual teams, two unified Great Britain teams competed.

- Belgium
- France University
- Georgia
- Germany
- Great Britain Royals
- Great Britain Lions
- Italy
- Lithuania
- Poland
- Portugal
- Russia
- Spain

== Pool Stage ==
Key to colours in group tables
Teams that advanced to the Cup Quarterfinal

=== Pool A ===
Teams	Pld	W	D	L	PF	PA	+/−	Pts
Great Britain Lions	3	3	0	0	68	21	+47	9
France	3	2	0	1	50	60	-10	7
Portugal	3	1	0	2	33	35	-2	5
Poland	3	0	0	3	26	71	-45	3

France	29–12	Poland

Portugal	7–14	Great Britain Lions

France	7–36	Great Britain Lions

Portugal	14–7	Poland

France	14–12	Portugal

Great Britain Lions (United Kingdom)	28–7	Poland

=== Pool B ===
Teams	Pld	W	D	L	PF	PA	+/−	Pts
Germany	3	3	0	0	59	12	+41	9
Spain	3	2	0	1	54	5	+49	7
Belgium	3	1	0	2	41	61	-20	5
Italy	3	0	0	3	7	83	-76	3

Spain	35–0	Italy

Germany	35–12	Belgium

Spain	19–0	Belgium

Germany	19–0	Italy

Spain	0–5	Germany

Belgium	29–7	Italy

=== Pool C ===
Teams	Pld	W	D	L	PF	PA	+/−	Pts
Great Britain Royals	3	3	0	0	76	19	+57	9
Russia	2	2	0	1	64	22	+42	7
Georgia	3	1	0	2	19	29	-10	5
Lithuania	3	0	0	3	0	89	-89	3

Great Britain Royals (United Kingdom)	17–7	Georgia

Russia	40–0	Lithuania

Great Britain Royals (United Kingdom)	42–0	Lithuania

Russia	12–5	Georgia

Great Britain Royals (United Kingdom)	17–12	Russia

Lithuania	0–7	Georgia

== Knockout stage ==
=== Bowl ===
Semi-finals
4 June 2016 – TBD – Moscow
Belgium	38
Lithuania	5
4 June 2016 – TBD – Moscow
Poland	12
Italy	21

Final
4 June 2016 – TBD – Moscow
Belgium	12
Italy	14
Third place
4 June 2016 – TBD – Moscow
Lithuania	12
Poland	29

=== Plate ===
Quarter-finals
4 June 2016 – 10:00 – Moscow
Great Britain Lions	36
Georgia	0
4 June 2016 – 11:06 – Moscow
Spain	12
Russia	26
4 June 2016 – 10:22 – Moscow
Germany	21
Portugal	0
4 June 2016 – 10:44 – Moscow
Great Britain Royals	15
France	17

Semi-finals
4 June 2016 – TBD – Moscow
Georgia	9
Spain	7
4 June 2016 – TBD – Moscow
Portugal	5
Great Britain Royals	34

Final
4 June 2016 – TBD – Moscow
Georgia	12
Great Britain Royals	15
Third place
4 June 2016 – TBD – Moscow
Spain	19
Portugal	7

=== Cup ===
Quarter-finals
4 June 2016 – 10:00 – Moscow
Great Britain Lions	36
Georgia	0
4 June 2016 – 11:06 – Moscow
Russia	26
Spain	12
4 June 2016 – 10:22 – Moscow
Germany	21
Portugal	0
4 June 2016 – 10:44 – Moscow
Great Britain Royals	15
France	17

Semi-finals
4 June 2016 – TBD – Moscow
Great Britain Lions	10
Russia	17
4 June 2016 – TBD – Moscow
Germany	14
France	19

Final
4 June 2016 – TBD – Moscow
Russia	24
France	7
Third place
4 June 2016 – TBD – Moscow
Great Britain Lions	28
Germany	5
