= 2016 Exeter Sevens =

- Sevens Grand Prix Series VI
- Host nation: England
- Date: 9–10 July 2016

Cup
- Champion: Great Britain Royals
- Runner-up: France
- Third: Spain

Plate
- Winner: Great Britain Lions
- Runner-up: Germany

Bowl
- Winner: Portugal
- Runner-up: Belgium

The 2016 Exeter Sevens is the second tournament of the 2016 Sevens Grand Prix Series. It will be held over the weekend of 9–10 July 2016.

== Teams ==
12 teams participated in the tournament. In preparation for the 2016 Olympics, instead of England, Scotland, and Wales fielding individual teams, two unified Great Britain teams will compete.

- Belgium
- France
- Georgia
- Germany
- Great Britain Royals
- Great Britain Lions
- Italy
- Lithuania
- Poland
- Portugal
- Russia
- Spain

== Pool Stage ==
Key to colours in group tables
Teams that advanced to the Cup Quarterfinal

=== Pool A ===
Teams	Pld	W	D	L	PF	PA	+/−	Pts
Spain	3	3	0	0	55	14	41	9
Russia	3	1	1	1	28	28	0	6
Georgia	3	0	2	1	31	36	-5	5
Lithuania	3	0	1	2	27	39	-12	4

9 July 2016

Russia	12–5	Lithuania

9 July 2016

Georgia	7–12	Spain

9 July 2016

Russia	14–21	Spain

9 July 2016

Georgia	12–12	Lithuania

9 July 2016

Russia	12–12	Georgia

9 July 2016

Spain	22–0	Lithuania

=== Pool B ===
Teams	Pld	W	D	L	PF	PA	+/−	Pts
Great Britain Royals	3	3	0	0	91	10	81	9
France	3	2	0	1	81	36	45	7
Poland	3	1	0	2	31	93	-62	5
Portugal	3	0	0	3	21	85	-64	3

9 July 2016

France	36–12	Poland

9 July 2016

Great Britain Royals (United Kingdom)	31–0	Portugal

9 July 2016

France	35–7	Portugal

9 July 2016

Great Britain Royals (United Kingdom)	43–0	Poland

9 July 2016

France	10–17	Great Britain Royals

9 July 2016

Portugal	14–19	Poland

=== Pool C ===
Teams	Pld	W	D	L	PF	PA	+/−	Pts
Great Britain Lions	3	3	0	0	103	5	57	9
Italy	3	2	0	1	31	58	-27	7
Germany	3	1	0	2	38	79	-41	5
Belgium	3	0	0	3	34	64	-30	3

9 July 2016

Great Britain Lions (United Kingdom)	31–5	Belgium

9 July 2016

Germany	17–19	Italy

9 July 2016

Great Britain Lions (United Kingdom)	31–0	Italy

9 July 2016

Germany	21–19	Belgium

9 July 2016

Great Britain Lions (United Kingdom)	41–0	Germany

9 July 2016

Italy	12–10	Belgium

== Knockout stage ==
=== Bowl ===
Semi-finals
10 July 2016 – TBD – Exeter
Portugal	26
Poland	17
10 July 2016 – TBD – Exeter
Lithuania	5
Belgium	35

Final
10 July 2016 – TBD – Exeter
Portugal	31
Belgium	5
Third place
10 July 2016 – TBD – Exeter
Poland	17
Lithuania	0

=== Plate ===
Quarter-finals
10 July 2016 – TBD – Exeter
Spain	26
Germany	0
10 July 2016 – TBD – Exeter
France	10
Italy	5
10 July 2016 – TBD – Exeter
Great Britain Royals	24
Georgia	7
10 July 2016 – TBD – Exeter
Great Britain Lions	5
Russia	7

Semi-finals
10 July 2016 – TBD – Exeter
Germany	21
Italy	12
10 July 2016 – TBD – Exeter
Georgia	7
Great Britain Lions	22

Final
10 July 2016 – TBD – Exeter
Germany	19
Great Britain Lions	31
Third place
10 July 2016 – TBD – Exeter
Italy	7
Georgia	0

=== Cup ===
Quarter-finals
10 July 2016 – TBD – Exeter
Spain	26
Germany	0
10 July 2016 – TBD – Exeter
France	10
Italy	5
10 July 2016 – TBD – Exeter
Great Britain Royals	24
Georgia	7
10 July 2016 – TBD – Exeter
Great Britain Lions	5
Russia	7

Semi-finals
10 July 2016 – TBD – Exeter
Spain	0
France	31
10 July 2016 – TBD – Exeter
Great Britain Royals	12
Russia	10

Final
10 July 2016 – TBD – Exeter
France	17
Great Britain Royals	33
Third place
10 July 2016 – TBD – Exeter
Spain	17
Russia	7
