= 2016 Gdynia Sevens =

- Sevens Grand Prix Series VI
- Host nation: Poland
- Date: 16–17 July 2016

Cup
- Champion: Great Britain Roylas
- Runner-up: Great Britain Lions
- Third: Russia

Plate
- Winner: Italy
- Runner-up: France

Bowl
- Winner: Belgium
- Runner-up: Portugal

The 2016 Gdynia Sevens is the third and last tournament of the 2016 Sevens Grand Prix Series. It was held over the weekend of 16–17 July 2016.

== Teams ==
12 teams participated in the tournament. In preparation for the 2016 Olympics, instead of England, Scotland, and Wales fielding individual teams, two unified Great Britain teams will compete.

- Belgium
- France Development
- Georgia
- Germany
- Great Britain Royals
- Great Britain Lions
- Italy
- Lithuania
- Poland
- Portugal
- Russia
- Spain

== Pool Stage ==
Key to colours in group tables
Teams that advanced to the Cup Quarterfinal

=== Pool A ===
Teams	Pld	W	D	L	PF	PA	+/−	Pts
Great Britain Royals	3	3	0	0	111	14	97	9
Germany	3	2	0	1	59	65	-6	7
Italy	3	1	0	2	69	67	2	5
Lithuania	3	0	0	3	15	108	-93	3

16 July 2016

Great Britain Royals (United Kingdom)	42–0	Lithuania

16 July 2016

Germany	26–22	Italy

16 July 2016

Great Britain Royals (United Kingdom)	36–7	Italy

16 July 2016

Germany	26–10	Lithuania

16 July 2016

Great Britain Royals (United Kingdom)	33–7	Germany

16 July 2016

Italy	40–5	Lithuania

=== Pool B ===
Teams	Pld	W	D	L	PF	PA	+/−	Pts
Great Britain Lions	3	3	0	0	74	40	34	9
France	3	2	0	1	83	59	24	7
Georgia	3	1	0	2	73	46	27	5
Poland	3	0	0	3	33	118	-85	3

16 July 2016

France	40–19	Poland

16 July 2016

Great Britain Lions (United Kingdom)	15–14	Georgia

16 July 2016

France	31–14	Georgia

16 July 2016

Great Britain Lions (United Kingdom)	33–14	Poland

16 July 2016

France	12–26	Great Britain Lions

16 July 2016

Georgia	45–0	Poland

=== Pool C ===
Teams	Pld	W	D	L	PF	PA	+/−	Pts
Russia	3	2	1	0	50	33	17	8
Spain	3	1	1	1	47	31	16	6
Portugal	3	1	0	2	57	59	-2	5
Belgium	3	1	0	2	31	62	-31	5

16 July 2016

Spain	14–17	Belgium

16 July 2016

Russia	26–19	Portugal

16 July 2016

Spain	26–7	Portugal

16 July 2016

Russia	17–7	Belgium

16 July 2016

Spain	7–7	Russia

16 July 2016

Portugal	31–7	Belgium

== Knockout stage ==
=== Bowl ===
Semi-finals
17 July 2016 – TBD – TBD
Portugal	31
Lithuania	12
17 July 2016 – TBD – TBD
Belgium	26
Poland	17

Final
17 July 2016 – TBD – TBD
Portugal	0
Belgium	14
Third place
17 July 2016 – TBD – TBD
Lithuania	7
Poland	27

=== Plate ===
Quarter-finals
17 July 2016 – TBD – TBD
Great Britain Royals	26
Italy	0
17 July 2016 – TBD – TBD
France	12
Spain	15
17 July 2016 – TBD – TBD
Great Britain Lions	12
Georgia	0
17 July 2016 – TBD – TBD
Russia	29
Germany	19

Semi-finals
17 July 2016 – TBD – TBD
Italy	26
France	0
17 July 2016 – TBD – TBD
Georgia	17
Germany	10

Final
17 July 2016 – TBD – TBD
Italy	14
Georgia	12
Third place
17 July 2016 – TBD – TBD
France	26
Germany	17

=== Cup ===
Quarter-finals
17 July 2016 – TBD – TBD
Great Britain Royals	26
Italy	0
10 July 2016 – TBD – TBD
France	12
Spain	15
17 July 2016 – TBD – TBD
Great Britain Lions	12
Georgia	0
17 July 2016 – TBD – TBD
Russia	29
Germany	19

Semi-finals
17 July 2016 – TBD – TBD
Great Britain Royals	22
Spain	10
10 July 2016 – TBD – TBD
Great Britain Lions	17
Russia	14

Final
17 July 2016 – TBD – TBD
Great Britain Royals	26
Great Britain Lions	14
Third place
10 July 2016 – TBD – TBD
Spain	7
Russia	31
