= 2016 Rugby Europe Sevens Grand Prix Series =

- Hosts: Russia; England; Poland
- Date: 4 June - 17 July
- Nations: 12

Final positions
- Champions: Great Britain Royals
- Runners-up: Russia
- Third: Great Britain Lions

Series details
- Top try scorer: (Poland) Szymon Sirocki
- Top point scorer: (United Kingdom) Luke Treharne

The 2016 Rugby Europe Sevens Grand Prix Series competition was restructured from the previous year, now with four divisions: Sevens Grand Prix Series, the Trophy, Conference 1, and Conference 2.

In preparation for the 2016 Olympics, instead of England, Scotland, and Wales fielding their own teams, two unified teams, the Great Britain Royals and the Great Britain Lions, took part in the Grand Prix.

== Grand Prix series ==
=== Schedule ===
Date	Venue	Winner	Runner-up	Third
4–5 June	(Russia) Moscow	Russia	France	Great Britain Lions
9–10 July	(England) Exeter	Great Britain Royals	France	Spain
16–17 July	(Poland) Gdynia	Great Britain Royals	Great Britain Lions	Russia

=== Standings ===
The two highest teams who did not already have "core status" on the World Rugby Sevens Series—Spain and Germany—qualified for the 2017 Hong Kong Sevens qualifier, which in turn was a qualifying event for promotion to core team status on the 2017-18 World Rugby Sevens Series.

Legend
Winner
Qualified to 2017 Hong Kong Sevens qualifier
Relegated to Trophy for 2017

Rank	Team	Moscow	Exeter	Gdynia	Points
-	Great Britain Royals	12	20	20	52
1st place, gold medalist(s)	Russia	20	14	16	50
-	Great Britain Lions	16	12	18	46
2nd place, silver medalist(s)	France	18	18	8	44
3rd place, bronze medalist(s)	Spain	8	16	14	38
4	Germany	14	10	6	30
5	Georgia	10	6	10	26
6	Italy	4	8	12	24
7	Portugal	6	4	3	13
8	Belgium	3	3	4	10
9	Poland	2	2	2	6
10	Lithuania	1	1	1	3

- The GB teams were not included in the final ranking

=== Moscow ===
Event	Winners	Score	Finalists	Semifinalists
Cup	Russia	24–7	France	Great Britain Lions (Third); Germany
Plate	Great Britain Royals	15–12	Georgia	Spain (Seventh); Portugal
Bowl	Italy	14–12	Belgium	Poland (Eleventh); Lithuania

=== Exeter leg ===
Event	Winners	Score	Finalists	Semifinalists
Cup	Great Britain Royals	33–17	France	Spain (Third); Russia
Plate	Great Britain Lions	31–19	Germany	Italy (Seventh); Georgia
Bowl	Portugal	31–5	Belgium	Poland (Eleventh); Lithuania

=== Gdynia leg ===
Event	Winners	Score	Finalists	Semifinalists
Cup	Great Britain Royals	26-14	Great Britain Lions	Russia (Third); Spain
Plate	Italy	26-0	Georgia	France (Seventh); Germany
Bowl	Belgium	14-0	Portugal	Poland (Eleventh); Lithuania
