= 2017 RAN Sevens =

- Hosts: Mexico
- Date: 25–26 November
- Nations: Barbados; Bermuda; British Virgin Islands; Cayman Islands; Curação; Dominican Republic; Guyana; Jamaica; Mexico; Trinidad and Tobago

Final positions
- Champions: Jamaica
- Runners-up: Guyana
- Third: Mexico

The 2017 RAN Sevens was the 18th edition of the annual rugby sevens tournament organized by Rugby Americas North. It will be played at Campo Marte in Mexico City.

The tournament served as a qualifier for the following:

- The 2018 Hong Kong Sevens qualifier tournament, with the champion competing for a chance to be a core team of the 2018–19 World Rugby Sevens Series
- The 2018 Rugby World Cup Sevens, with the champion being eligible
- The 2018 Commonwealth Games, for the highest-placing Commonwealth of Nations member.
- The rugby sevens at the 2018 Central American and Caribbean Games

== Teams ==
The following teams participated:

- Barbados
- Bermuda
- British Virgin Islands
- Cayman Islands
- Curaçao
- Dominican Republic
- Guyana
- Jamaica
- Mexico
- Trinidad and Tobago

== Day 1 ==
All times are Central Standard Time (UTC−06:00)

Key to colours in group tables
Advances to Cup tournament
Advances to 7th-10th Place Round Robin

=== Pool A ===
Teams	Pld	W	D	L	PF	PA	+/−	Pts
Guyana	2	2	0	0	54	35	+19	6
Cayman Islands	2	1	0	1	37	40	−3	4
Barbados	2	0	0	2	35	51	−16	2

25 November 2017
11:44

Guyana	26−14	Cayman Islands

25 November 2017
13:56

Barbados	14−21	Cayman Islands

25 November 2017
16:08

Guyana	28−21	Barbados

=== Pool B ===
Teams	Pld	W	D	L	PF	PA	+/−	Pts
Jamaica	2	2	0	0	61	7	+54	6
Bermuda	2	1	0	1	19	49	−30	4
Dominican Republic	2	0	0	2	21	45	−24	2

25 November 2017
12:06

Jamaica	26−7	Dominican Republic

25 November 2017
14:18

Bermuda	19−14	Dominican Republic

25 November 2017
16:30

Jamaica	35−0	Bermuda

=== Pool C ===
Teams	Pld	W	D	L	PF	PA	+/−	Pts
Mexico	3	3	0	0	146	12	+134	9
Trinidad and Tobago	3	2	0	1	115	19	+96	7
British Virgin Islands	3	1	0	2	31	106	−75	5
Curaçao	3	0	0	3	7	162	−155	3

25 November 2017
11:22

Mexico	61−0	Curaçao

25 November 2017
11:44

Trinidad and Tobago	38−0	British Virgin Islands

25 November 2017
13:34

Mexico	66−0	British Virgin Islands

25 November 2017
13:34

Trinidad and Tobago	70−0	Curaçao

25 November 2017
15:46

Trinidad and Tobago	12−19	Mexico

25 November 2017
15:46

Curaçao	7−31	British Virgin Islands

== Day 2 ==
=== Round Robin Pool ===
Teams	Pld	W	D	L	PF	PA	+/−	Pts
Barbados	3	3	0	0	103	5	+98	9
Dominican Republic	3	2	0	1	73	28	+45	7
British Virgin Islands	3	1	0	2	26	75	−49	5
Curaçao	3	0	0	3	14	108	−94	3

26 November 2017
10:58

Barbados	42−0	Curaçao

26 November 2017
10:58

Dominican Republic	28−0	British Virgin Islands

26 November 2017
12:48

Barbados	40−0	British Virgin Islands

26 November 2017
12:48

Dominican Republic	40−7	Curaçao

26 November 2017
14:46

British Virgin Islands	26−7	Curaçao

26 November 2017
15:08

Barbados	21−5	Dominican Republic

=== Cup Tournament ===
Pool 1

Teams	Pld	W	D	L	PF	PA	+/−	Pts
Guyana	2	1	1	0	33	26	+7	5
Trinidad and Tobago	2	1	0	1	29	33	-4	4
Bermuda	2	0	1	1	38	41	−3	3

26 November 2017
10:14

Guyana	19−19	Bermuda

26 November 2017
12:04

Bermuda	19−22	Trinidad and Tobago

26 November 2017
14:02

Guyana	14−7	Trinidad and Tobago

Pool 2

Teams	Pld	W	D	L	PF	PA	+/−	Pts
Jamaica	2	2	0	0	45	29	+16	6
Mexico	2	1	0	1	45	26	+19	4
Cayman Islands	2	0	0	2	17	52	−35	2

26 November 2017
10:36

Jamaica	19−17	Cayman Islands

26 November 2017
12:26

Mexico	33−0	Cayman Islands

26 November 2017
14:24

Jamaica	26−12	Mexico

Placement Rounds

26 November 2017
16:22

Bermuda	14−21	Cayman Islands

26 November 2017
16:44

Trinidad and Tobago	14−22	Mexico

26 November 2017
17:28

Guyana	24−28	Jamaica

== Standings ==
Key to colours in group tables
Green fill	Qualified to 2018 Hong Kong Sevens, 2018 Rugby World Cup Sevens and 2018 Commonwealth Games
Blue bar	Qualified to 2018 Central American and Caribbean Games

Rank	Team
1st place, gold medalist(s)	Jamaica
2nd place, silver medalist(s)	Guyana
3rd place, bronze medalist(s)	Mexico
4	Trinidad and Tobago
5	Cayman Islands
6	Bermuda
7	Barbados
8	Dominican Republic
9	British Virgin Islands
10	Curaçao

== See also ==
- 2018 Rugby World Cup Sevens qualifying – Men
- Rugby sevens at the 2018 Commonwealth Games
- 2017 RAN Women's Sevens
