= Matteo Meggiato =

Italian rugby union player (born 2001)

- Born: 10 December 2001 (age 24) Italy
- Height: 1.91 m (6 ft 3 in)
- Weight: 96 kg (212 lb; 15 st 2 lb)

Rugby union career
- Position: Flanker
- Current team: Rovigo Delta
Youth career
- CUS Padova Rugby
- –: F.I.R. Academy
Senior career
Years	Team	Apps	(Points)
2020–2022	Mogliano	7	(0)
2022	→ Benetton	5	(0)
2022−2023	Benetton	1	(0)
2023	→Mogliano	4	(0)
2023−	Rovigo Delta		
- Correct as of 25 Mar 2023
International career
Years	Team	Apps	(Points)
2020	Italy U20	2	(0)
2021−2022	Emerging Italy	3	(0)
- Correct as of 28 Jan 2022
National sevens team
Years	Team		Comps
2023	Italy Sevens		5
- Correct as of 22 May 23

Matteo Meggiato (born 10 December 2001) is an Italian rugby union player, currently playing for Italian Serie A Elite team Rovigo Delta. His preferred position is flanker.

Under contract with Top10 team Mogliano, signed for Benetton as a Permit player in June 2021. He made his debut in Round 11 of the 2021–22 United Rugby Championship against the Dragons. In August 2022 he signed with Benetton for United Rugby Championship season, but in January 2023 he come back to Mogliano in Top10, on loan, until the end of the season.

In January 2020, Meggiato was named in the Italy Under 20 squad for the 2020 Six Nations Under 20s Championship. On 8 November 2021 he was named in the Italy A squad for the 2021 end-of-year rugby union internationals and on 8 December he was named in Emerging Italy 27-man squad also for the 2021 end-of-year rugby union internationals. On 13 January 2024 he was called in Italy Under 23 squad for test series against IRFU Combined Academies.

In April 2023 he was named in Italy Sevens squad for the 2023 World Rugby Sevens Challenger Series.
