= 2018 Rugby Europe Sevens Trophy =

- Hosts: Croatia; Lithuania
- Date: 8 June – 1 July

Final positions
- Champions: Romania
- Runners-up: Belgium
- Third: Lithuania

The 2018 Rugby Europe Sevens Trophy is the second division of Rugby Europe's 2018 sevens season. This edition was hosted by the cities of Zagreb and Šiauliai from 7 June to 1 July, with the winner promoted to the 2019 Grand Prix and the two teams with the fewest points relegated to 2019 Conference 1.

== Schedule ==
Date	Venue	Winner	Runner-up	Third
8–9 June	(Croatia) Zagreb	Romania	Lithuania	Belgium
30 June – 1 July	(Lithuania) Šiauliai	Romania	Belgium	Latvia

== Standings ==
Legend
Promoted to the 2019 Grand Prix series
Relegated to 2019 Conference 1

Rank	Team	Zagreb	Šiauliai	Points
1st place, gold medalist(s)	Romania	20	20	40
2nd place, silver medalist(s)	Belgium	16	18	34
3rd place, bronze medalist(s)	Lithuania	18	12	30
4	Denmark	12	14	26
5	Israel	14	8	22
6	Luxembourg	8	10	18
7	Latvia	1	16	17
8	Ukraine	10	3	13
9	Croatia	6	6	12
10	Bulgaria	4	2	6
11	Hungary	2	4	6
12	Cyprus	3	1	4

== Zagreb ==
Was held 8–9 June.

Event	Winners	Score	Finalists	Semifinalists
Cup	Romania	31–26	Lithuania	Belgium (Third); Israel
5th Place	Denmark	12–10	Ukraine	Luxembourg (Seventh); Croatia
Challenge Trophy	Bulgaria	43–17	Cyprus	Hungary (Eleventh); Latvia

Key to colours in group tables
Teams that advance to Cup Quarterfinal
Teams that advance to Challenge Trophy Semifinals

=== Pool Stage ===
==== Pool A ====
Team	Pld	W	D	L	PF	PA	PD	Pts
Belgium	3	3	0	0	67	12	+55	9
Israel	3	2	0	1	48	29	+19	7
Croatia	3	1	0	2	38	60	–22	5
Bulgaria	3	0	0	3	29	81	–52	3

7 June 2018	Belgium	33–7	Bulgaria
12:28

7 June 2018	Croatia	7–26	Israel
12:50

7 June 2018	Belgium	12–5	Israel
15:13

7 June 2018	Croatia	31–12	Bulgaria
15:35

7 June 2018	Israel	17–10	Bulgaria
17:58

7 June 2018	Belgium	22–0	Croatia
18:20

==== Pool B ====
Team	Pld	W	D	L	PF	PA	PD	Pts
Romania	3	2	1	0	86	17	+69	7
Lithuania	3	2	1	0	83	31	+52	7
Hungary	3	1	0	2	26	57	–31	5
Cyprus	3	0	0	3	19	109	–90	3

7 June 2018	Romania	24–0	Hungary
11:44

7 June 2018	Lithuania	45–7	Cyprus
12:06

7 June 2018	Romania	45–0	Cyprus
14:29

7 June 2018	Lithuania	21–7	Hungary
14:51

7 June 2018	Cyprus	12–19	Hungary
17:14

7 June 2018	Romania	17–17	Lithuania
17:36

==== Pool C ====
Team	Pld	W	D	L	PF	PA	PD	Pts
Denmark	3	3	0	0	77	24	+53	9
Ukraine	3	2	0	1	65	41	+24	7
Luxembourg	3	1	0	2	36	49	-13	5
Latvia	3	0	0	3	12	76	-64	3

7 June 2018	Luxembourg	17–5	Latvia
11:00

7 June 2018	Ukraine	17–22	Denmark
11:22

7 June 2018	Luxembourg	7–24	Denmark
13:45

7 June 2018	Ukraine	28–7	Latvia
14:07

7 June 2018	Denmark	31–0	Latvia
16:30

7 June 2018	Luxembourg	12–20	Ukraine
16:52

=== Knockout stage ===
==== Challenge Trophy ====
Semi-finals
9 June 2018 – 11:28
Hungary	19
Cyprus	20
9 June 2018 – 11:50
Bulgaria	21
Latvia	14

Final
9 June 2018 – 15:05
Cyprus	17
Bulgaria	43
Eleventh Place
9 June 2018 – 14:43
Hungary	21
Latvia	12

==== 5th Place ====
Semi-finals
9 June 2018 – 13:15
Croatia	5
Ukraine	12
9 June 2018 – 13:37
Luxembourg	7
Denmark	17

Final
9 June 2018 – 16:26
Ukraine	10
Denmark	12
Seventh Place
9 June 2018 – 16:02
Croatia	7
Luxembourg	14

==== Cup ====
Quarter-finals
9 June 2018 – 10:00
Belgium	26
Croatia	7
9 June 2018 – 11:06
Lithuania	17
Ukraine	7
9 June 2018 – 10:22
Romania	27
Luxembourg	14
9 June 2018 – 10:44
Denmark	7
Israel	10

Semi-finals
9 June 2018 – 13:59
Belgium	7
Lithuania	17
9 June 2018 – 14:21
Romania	26
Israel	12

Final
9 June 2018 – 18:15
Lithuania	26
Romania	31
Third place
9 June 2018 – 17:14
Belgium	22
Israel	7

== Šiauliai ==
Will be held 30 June – 1 July.

Event	Winners	Score	Finalists	Semifinalists
Cup	Romania	35–5	Belgium	Latvia (Third); Denmark
5th place	Lithuania	22–5	Luxembourg	Israel (Seventh); Croatia
Challenge Trophy	Hungary	17–14	Ukraine	Bulgaria (Eleventh); Cyprus

Key to colours in group tables
Teams that advance to Cup Quarterfinal
Teams that advance to Challenge Trophy Semifinals

=== Pool Stage ===
==== Pool A ====
Team	Pld	W	D	L	PF	PA	PD	Pts
Luxembourg	3	1	2	0	46	44	+2	7
Romania	3	2	0	1	93	24	+69	7
Latvia	3	1	1	1	53	55	–2	6
Ukraine	3	0	1	2	5	74	–69	4

30 June 2018	Romania	38–0	Latvia
9:00

30 June 2018	Ukraine	5–5	Luxembourg
9:22

30 June 2018	Romania	22–24	Luxembourg
11:45

30 June 2018	Ukraine	0–36	Latvia
12:07

30 June 2018	Romania	33–0	Ukraine
14:30

30 June 2018	Luxembourg	17–17	Latvia
14:52

==== Pool B ====
Team	Pld	W	D	L	PF	PA	PD	Pts
Lithuania	3	3	0	0	99	33	+66	0
Croatia	3	2	0	1	90	66	+24	0
Denmark	3	1	0	2	69	81	–12	5
Hungary	3	0	0	3	33	111	–78	3

30 June 2018	Denmark	14–43	Croatia
10:28

30 June 2018	Lithuania	42–0	Hungary
10:50

30 June 2018	Denmark	36–14	Hungary
13:13

30 June 2018	Lithuania	33–14	Croatia
13:35

30 June 2018	Croatia	33–19	Hungary
15:58

30 June 2018	Lithuania	24–19	Denmark
16:20

==== Pool C ====
Team	Pld	W	D	L	PF	PA	PD	Pts
Israel	3	3	0	0	102	26	+76	9
Belgium	3	2	0	1	78	52	+26	7
Bulgaria	3	1	0	2	33	95	–62	5
Cyprus	3	0	0	3	50	90	–40	3

30 June 2018	Belgium	26–12	Cyprus
9:44

30 June 2018	Israel	31–7	Bulgaria
10:06

30 June 2018	Belgium	40–7	Bulgaria
12:29

30 June 2018	Israel	38–14	Cyprus
12:51

30 June 2018	Belgium	12–33	Israel
15:14

30 June 2018	Bulgaria	26–24	Cyprus
15:36

=== Knockout stage ===
==== Challenge Trophy ====
Semi-finals
1 July 2018 – 10:28
Bulgaria	7
Hungary	14
1 July 2018 – 10:50
Cyprus	14
Ukraine	31

Final
1 July 2018 – 14:05
Hungary	17
Ukraine	14
Eleventh Place
1 July 2018 – 13:43
Bulgaria	24
Cyprus	12

==== 5th Place ====
Semi-finals
1 July 2018 – 12:15
Luxembourg	24
Croatia	21
1 July 2018 – 12:37
Lithuania	28
Israel	0

Final
1 July 2018 – 15:24
Luxembourg	5
Lithuania	22
Seventh Place
1 July 2018 – 15:02
Croatia	19
Israel	35

==== Cup ====
Quarter-finals
1 July 2018 – 9:00
Luxembourg	0
Denmark	34
1 July 2018 – 10:06
Croatia	14
Belgium	17
1 July 2018 – 9:22
Lithuania	12
Latvia	14
1 July 2018 – 9:44
Israel	10
Romania	17

Semi-finals
1 July 2018 – 12:59
Denmark	7
Belgium	14
1 July 2018 – 13:21
Latvia	0
Romania	40

Final
1 July 2018 – 15:52
Belgium	5
Romania	35
Third place
1 July 2018 – 16:14
Denmark	10
Latvia	38
