= France Women's Sevens =

Annual women's rugby sevens tournament

- Upcoming season or competition: 2023 France Women's Sevens
- Sport: Rugby sevens
- First season: 2016
- No. of teams: 12
- Country: France
- Most recent champion: New Zealand (2023)
- Most titles: New Zealand (4 titles)
- Website: francesevens.fr

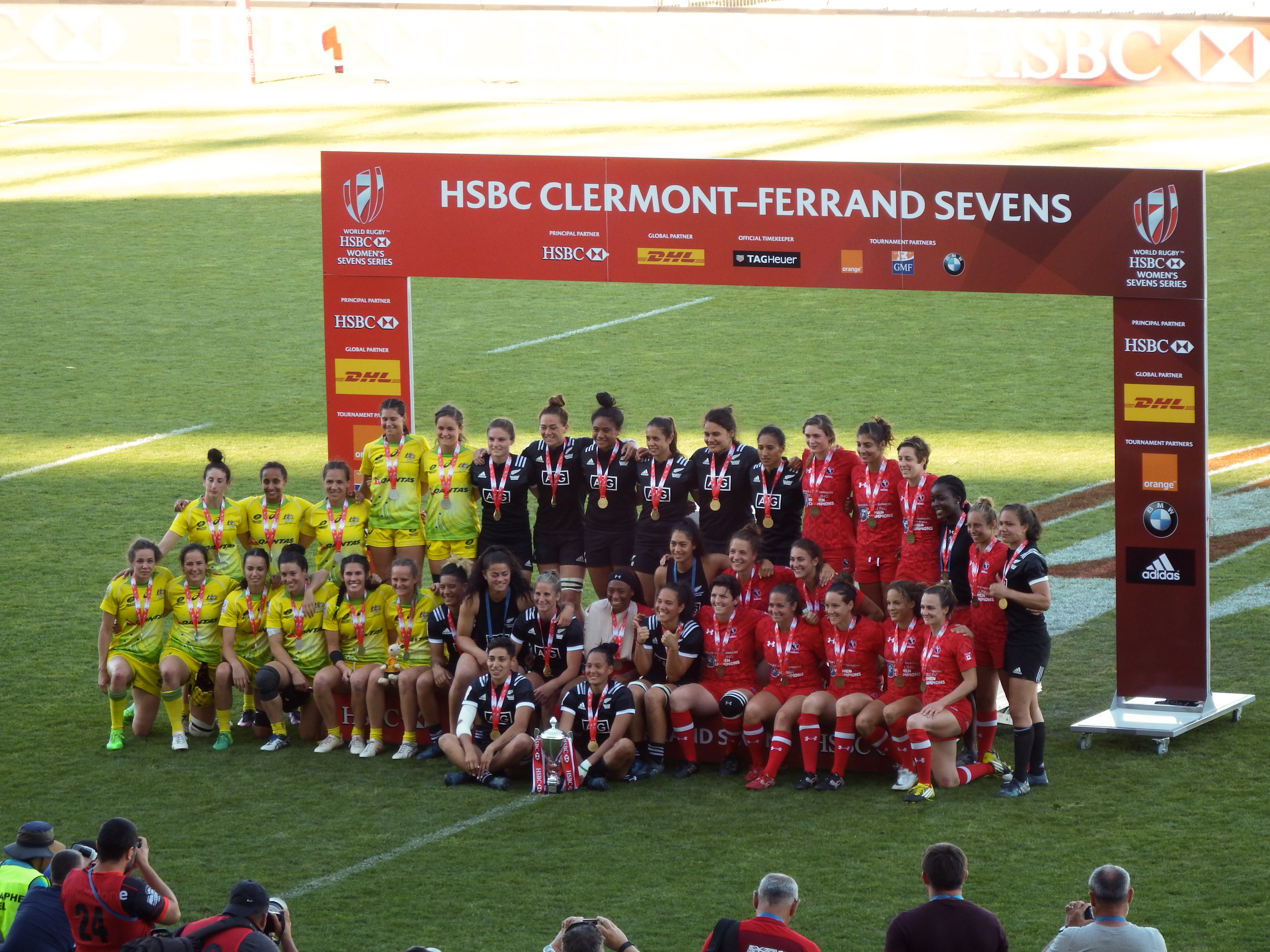
Medal winners of the tournament in 2017.

The France Women's Sevens is an annual women's rugby sevens tournament, and was one of the stops on the World Rugby Women's Sevens Series. France joined in the fourth year of the Series. As of the current 2019–20 season, the tournament is held at Stade Jean-Bouin in Paris, having returned to that venue after one edition at Parc des Sports Aguiléra in Biarritz. It had originally been held in Clermont-Ferrand, and later moved to Stade Jean-Bouin.

== History ==
The tournament was launched in 2016 as the last stage of the annual World Rugby Women's Sevens Series, with first two editions played at the Gabriel-Montpied stadium in Clermont-Ferrand.

In 2018 the event moved to Jean-Bouin stadium in Paris, bringing together the men's and women's France Sevens at the same venue in a combined tournament.

However, for the 2019 edition, the French Rugby Federation and World Rugby chose to host separate men's and women's events again. This was done to improve the visibility of the women's competition as well as to avoid the possible unavailability of the Jean-Bouin stadium due to home matches hosted by the Stade Français Paris club. The 2019 France Women's Sevens was therefore relocated to Parc des Sports Aguiléra in Biarritz. The tournament would return to Paris for 2019–20 and beyond.

Former tournament logos
Clermont Sevens in 2016 and 2017.

Biarritz Sevens in 2019.

== Champions ==
Year	Venue	Cup final			Placings			Refs
		Winner	Score	Runner-up	Third	Fourth	Fifth	
2016	Stade Gabriel Montpied	Canada	29–19	Australia	New Zealand	England	France	
2017	Stade Gabriel Montpied	New Zealand	22–7	Australia	Canada	France	Fiji	
2018	Stade Jean-Bouin	New Zealand	33–7	Australia	Canada	France	United States	
2019	Parc des Sports Aguiléra	United States	26–10	New Zealand	Canada	Spain	Australia	
World Series tournaments in Paris for women's teams were cancelled in 2020 and 2021 due to impacts of the COVID-19 pandemic.
2022	Stade Ernest-Wallon	New Zealand	21–14	Australia	Fiji	Ireland	France	
2023	Stade Ernest-Wallon	New Zealand	19–14	United States	Australia	France	Japan	

=== Team summary ===
Team	(gold) Gold	(silver) Silver	(bronze) Bronze	Fourth	Total
New Zealand	4	1	1	—	6
United States	1	1	—	—	2
Canada	1	—	3	—	4
Australia	—	4	1	—	5
Fiji	—	—	1	—	1
France	—	—	—	3	3
Ireland	—	—	—	1	1
England	—	—	—	1	1
Spain	—	—	—	1	1

== See also ==
- France Sevens (men's tournament)
