= 2017 Exeter Sevens =

- Sevens Grand Prix Series VII
- Host nation: England
- Date: 15–16 July 2017

Cup
- Champion: Russia
- Runner-up: Wales
- Third: Ireland

The 2017 Exeter Sevens was the final tournament of the 2017 Sevens Grand Prix Series, hosted in Sandy Park at Exeter. Russia won the tournament, defeating Wales in the final. Ireland's Jordan Conroy was named player of the tournament.

This tournament settled the two European teams to be invited to the 2018 Rugby World Cup Sevens, with Russia and Ireland progressing.

== Teams ==
- Belgium
- England
- France
- Georgia
- Germany
- Ireland
- Italy
- Poland
- Portugal
- Russia
- Spain
- Wales

== Pool stage ==
Key to colours in group tables
Teams advance to the Cup quarter-final

=== Pool A ===
Teams	Pld	W	D	L	PF	PA	+/−	Pts
Ireland	3	3	0	0	102	14	+88	9
Portugal	3	2	0	1	41	62	−21	7
France	3	1	0	2	38	48	−10	5
Belgium	3	0	0	3	24	81	−57	3

15 July 2017
11:30

Ireland	36–7	Portugal

Sandy Park

15 July 2017
11:52

France	24–5	Belgium

Sandy Park

15 July 2017
14:15

Ireland	40–7	Belgium

Sandy Park

15 July 2017
14:37

France	14–17	Portugal

Sandy Park

15 July 2017
17:00

Ireland	26–0	France

Sandy Park

15 July 2017
17:22

Belgium	12–17	Portugal

Sandy Park

=== Pool B ===
Teams	Pld	W	D	L	PF	PA	+/−	Pts
Russia	3	2	0	1	56	19	+37	7
Wales	3	2	0	1	64	29	+35	7
Georgia	3	2	0	1	49	29	+20	7
Poland	3	0	0	3	15	108	−97	3

15 July 2017
12:14

Russia	34–0	Poland

Sandy Park

15 July 2017
12:36

Wales	14–7	Georgia

Sandy Park

15 July 2017
14:59

Russia	5–7	Georgia

Sandy Park

15 July 2017
15:21

Wales	38–5	Poland

Sandy Park

15 July 2017
17:44

Russia	17–12	Wales

Sandy Park

15 July 2017
18:06

Georgia	35–10	Poland

Sandy Park

=== Pool C ===
Teams	Pld	W	D	L	PF	PA	+/−	Pts
Spain	3	3	0	0	64	39	+25	9
Germany	3	2	0	1	46	39	+7	7
England	3	1	0	2	39	46	−7	5
Italy	3	0	0	3	29	53	−14	3

15 July 2017
12:58

Germany	17–12	Italy

Sandy Park

15 July 2017
13:20

Spain	24–17	England

Sandy Park

15 July 2017
15:43

Spain	19–10	Italy

Sandy Park

15 July 2017
16:05

Germany	17–5	England

Sandy Park

15 July 2017
18:28

Spain	21–12	Germany

Sandy Park

15 July 2017
18:50

Italy	5–19	England

Sandy Park

== Knockout stage ==
=== Challenge Trophy ===
Semi-finals
2 July 2017 – 12:58 – Sandy Park
France	31
Poland	12
2 July 2017 – 13:20 – Sandy Park
Italy	12
Belgium	10

Final
2 July 2017 – 16:35 – Sandy Park
France	24
Italy	21
Third place
2 July 2017 – 16:13 – Sandy Park
Poland	12
Belgium	17

=== 5th place ===
Quarter-finals
16 July 2017 – 11:30 – Sandy Park
Ireland	24
England	7
16 July 2017 – 12:36 – Sandy Park
Wales	17
Germany	12
16 July 2017 – 11:52 – Sandy Park
Russia	19
Georgia	12
16 July 2017 – 12:14 – Sandy Park
Spain	14
Portugal	21

Semi-finals
16 July 2017 – 14:45 – Sandy Park
England	28
Germany	7
16 July 2017 – 15:07 – Sandy Park
Georgia	19
Spain	5

Final
16 July 2017 – 17:54 – Sandy Park
England	12
Georgia	17
Third place
16 July 2017 – 17:32 – Sandy Park
Germany	21
Spain	14

=== Cup ===
Quarter-finals
16 July 2017 – 11:30 – Sandy Park
Ireland	24
England	7
16 July 2017 – 12:36 – Sandy Park
Wales	17
Germany	12
16 July 2017 – 11:52 – Sandy Park
Russia	19
Georgia	12
16 July 2017 – 12:14 – Sandy Park
Spain	14
Portugal	21

Semi-finals
16 July 2017 – 15:29 – Sandy Park
Ireland	12
Wales	15
16 July 2017 – 15:51 – Sandy Park
Russia	17
Portugal	12

Final
16 July 2017 – 18:42 – Sandy Park
Wales	10
Russia	17
Third place
16 July 2017 – 18:16 – Sandy Park
Ireland	33
Portugal	12

== Overall ==
Pos	Team	Wn/Ls	Pts Dif	Pool
1	Russia	5–1	+56	B
2	Wales	4–2	+36	B
3	Ireland	5–1	+123	A
4	Portugal	3–3	−40	A
5	Georgia	4–2	+32	B
6	England	2–4	−6	C
7	Germany	3–3	−11	C
8	Spain	3–3	−3	C
