= Stade Gabriel-Montpied =

Stadium in Clermont-Ferrand, France

Coordinates: 45°48′57″N 3°07′18″E

- The stadium in 2017
- Interactive map of Stade Gabriel-Montpied
- Location: Clermont-Ferrand, France
- Owner: City of Clermont-Ferrand
- Capacity: 10,800 (2023–24); 17,230 (from 2025–26)
- Surface: grass
- Record attendance: 13,576 (Clermont Foot 63 vs Olympique de Marseille, 11 February 2023)
- Field size: 105 metres (344 ft) x 68 metres (223 ft)

Construction
- Opened: December 30, 1995
- Renovated: 2021
- Expanded: 2023–
- Cost: 77 M€ (renovation)

Tenants
- Clermont Foot; France Women's Sevens (2016–2017)

The Stade Gabriel-Montpied (French pronunciation: [stad ɡabʁijɛl mɔ̃pje]) is a multi-use stadium in Clermont-Ferrand, France. It is currently used mostly for football matches and is the home stadium of Clermont Foot. It was also the venue for the inaugural edition of the France Women's Sevens in the World Rugby Women's Sevens Series in 2016, and it hosted the 2017 Clermont-Ferrand Sevens, the third leg of the 2017 Rugby Europe Grand Prix series.

The stadium is able to hold 11,980 people and was built in 1995.

== History ==
In the summer of 2023, the start of phase 1 of the work on the new Gabriel Montpied will start with a new configuration for the 2023–24 season without the Tribune Limagne. The stadium's capacity for the 2023–24 season is therefore approximately 10,700 seats.

== See also ==
- List of football stadiums in France
- Lists of stadiums
