= 2017 Rugby Europe Sevens Grand Prix Series =

- Hosts: Russia; Poland; France; England
- Date: 3 June – 16 July

Final positions
- Champions: Russia
- Runners-up: Ireland
- Third: Spain

Series details
- Top try scorer: (Ireland) Jordan Conroy (17)
- Top point scorer: (Ireland) Billy Dardis (100)

The 2017 Rugby Europe Sevens Grand Prix served as a European qualifier not only for the 2018 Hong Kong Sevens qualifier tournament, but for two bids among the teams not already qualified for the 2018 Rugby World Cup Sevens.

== Schedule ==
Date	Venue	Winner	Runner-up	Third
3–4 June	(Russia) Moscow	Ireland	Spain	Russia
10–11 June	(Poland) Łódź	Russia	Spain	Ireland
1–2 July	(France) Clermont-Ferrand	Ireland	Russia	Spain
15–16 July	(England) Exeter	Russia	Wales	Ireland

== Standings ==
Notes	Legend
1, 2, 3	Top three qualify to 2018 Hong Kong Sevens
1, 2	Top two qualify to 2018 Rugby World Cup Sevens
	Relegated to Trophy for 2018

The 2017 Grand Prix Series serves as a qualifying event for two other tournaments:

- The three highest ranked European teams (other than the five teams below marked with a "C" that are not already core teams in the Sevens World Series) will qualify to the 2018 Hong Kong Sevens, with a chance to qualify for the 2018–19 World Rugby Sevens Series.
- The top two teams (other than the three teams marked with a "Q" that already qualified) will qualify for the 2018 Rugby World Cup Sevens.

Rank	Team	2018 HK 7s	2018 RWC 7s	Moscow	Łódź	Clermont-Ferrand	Exeter	Points
1st place, gold medalist(s)	Russia	C	1	16	20	18	20	74
2nd place, silver medalist(s)	Ireland	1	2	20	16	20	16	72
3rd place, bronze medalist(s)	Spain	C	-	18	18	16	6	58
4	Wales	C	Q	3	14	12	18	47
5	Germany	2	-	8	12	14	8	42
6	France	C	Q	12	8	10	4	34
7	Georgia	3	-	6	6	6	12	30
8	Portugal	-	-	10	2	1	14	27
9	England	C	Q	4	10	3	10	27
10	Italy	-	-	14	4	4	3	25
11	Belgium	-	-	2	3	8	2	15
12	Poland*	-	-	1	1	2	1	5

- Poland cannot be relegated due to being a host nation.

== Moscow ==
Event	Winners	Score	Finalists	Semifinalists
Cup	Ireland	12–0	Spain	Russia (Third); Italy
5th Place	France	33–21	Portugal	Germany (Seventh); Georgia
Challenge Trophy	England	21–17	Wales	Belgium (Eleventh); Poland

== Łódź ==
Event	Winners	Score	Finalists	Semifinalists
Cup	Russia	24–19 a.e.t.	Spain	Ireland (Third); Wales
5th Place	Germany	29–26	England	France (Seventh); Georgia
Challenge Trophy	Italy	21–17	Belgium	Portugal (Eleventh); Poland

== Clermont-Ferrand ==
Event	Winners	Score	Finalists	Semifinalists
Cup	Ireland	17–14	Russia	Spain (Third); Germany
5th Place	Wales	24–15	France	Belgium (Seventh); Georgia
Challenge Trophy	Italy	26–12	England	Poland (Eleventh); Portugal

== Exeter ==
Event	Winners	Score	Finalists	Semifinalists
Cup	Russia	17–10	Wales	Ireland (Third); Portugal
5th Place	Georgia	17–12	England	Germany (Seventh); Spain
Challenge Trophy	France	24–21	Italy	Belgium (Eleventh); Poland

== See also ==
- 2017 Rugby Europe Women's Sevens Championships
- 2018 Rugby World Cup Sevens qualifying – Men
