= 2017 Łódź Sevens =

- Sevens Grand Prix Series VII
- Host nation: Poland
- Date: 10–11 June 2017

Cup
- Champion: Russia
- Runner-up: Spain
- Third: Ireland

The 2017 Lodz Sevens is the second tournament of the 2017 Rugby Europe Grand Prix Series, hosted by Stadion Miejski at Łódź. It was held over the weekend of 10–11 June 2017, and with Russia's finals victory over Spain with Ireland taking bronze, there was a three-way tie for first in the series by the tournament's end.

== Teams ==
- Belgium
- England
- France
- Georgia
- Germany
- Ireland
- Italy
- Poland
- Portugal
- Russia
- Spain
- Wales

== Pool Stage ==
Key to colours in group tables
Teams that advanced to the Cup Quarterfinal

=== Pool A ===
Teams	Pld	W	D	L	PF	PA	+/−	Pts
Ireland	3	3	0	0	80	22	+58	9
Germany	3	2	0	1	59	45	+14	7
Portugal	3	0	1	2	33	68	-35	4
Poland	3	0	1	2	43	80	-37	4

10 June 2017
11:28

Germany	21-7	Portugal

Stadion ŁKS

10 June 2017
11:50

Ireland	28-10	Poland

Stadion ŁKS

10 June 2017
14:13

Germany	7-26	Ireland

Stadion ŁKS

10 June 2017
14:35

Poland	21-21	Portugal

Stadion ŁKS

10 June 2017
16:58

Ireland	26-5	Portugal

Stadion ŁKS

10 June 2017
17:20

Germany	31-12	Poland

Stadion ŁKS

=== Pool B ===
Teams	Pld	W	D	L	PF	PA	+/−	Pts
Spain	3	3	0	0	53	29	+24	9
Georgia	3	2	0	1	64	43	+21	7
France	3	1	0	2	53	36	+17	5
Belgium	3	0	0	3	17	79	-62	3

10 June 2017
10:44

Belgium	5-24	Spain

Stadion ŁKS

10 June 2017
11:06

France	14-24	Georgia

Stadion ŁKS

10 June 2017
13:29

Georgia	14-17	Spain

Stadion ŁKS

10 June 2017
13:51

Belgium	0-29	France

Stadion ŁKS

10 June 2017
16:14

France	10-12	Spain

Stadion ŁKS

10 June 2017
16:36

Belgium	12-26	Georgia

Stadion ŁKS

=== Pool C ===
Teams	Pld	W	D	L	PF	PA	+/−	Pts
Wales	3	3	0	0	75	28	+47	9
Russia	3	2	0	1	60	38	+22	7
England	3	1	0	2	47	67	-20	5
Italy	3	0	0	3	28	77	-49	3

10 June 2017
10:00

Russia	7-24	Wales

Stadion ŁKS

10 June 2017
10:22

England	26-14	Italy

Stadion ŁKS

10 June 2017
12:45

England	7-24	Russia

Stadion ŁKS

10 June 2017
13:07

Italy	7-22	Wales

Stadion ŁKS

10 June 2017
15:30

Italy	7-29	Russia

Stadion ŁKS

10 June 2017
15:52

England	14-29	Wales

Stadion ŁKS

== Knockout stage ==
=== Challenge Trophy ===
Semi-finals
11 June 2017 – 11:28 – Stadion ŁKS
Belgium	21
Portugal	19
11 June 2017 – 11:50 – Stadion ŁKS
Italy	21
Poland	19

Final
11 June 2017 – 15:41 – Stadion ŁKS
Belgium	17
Italy	21
Third place
11 June 2017 – 15:19 – Stadion ŁKS
Portugal	24
Poland	17

=== 5th Place ===
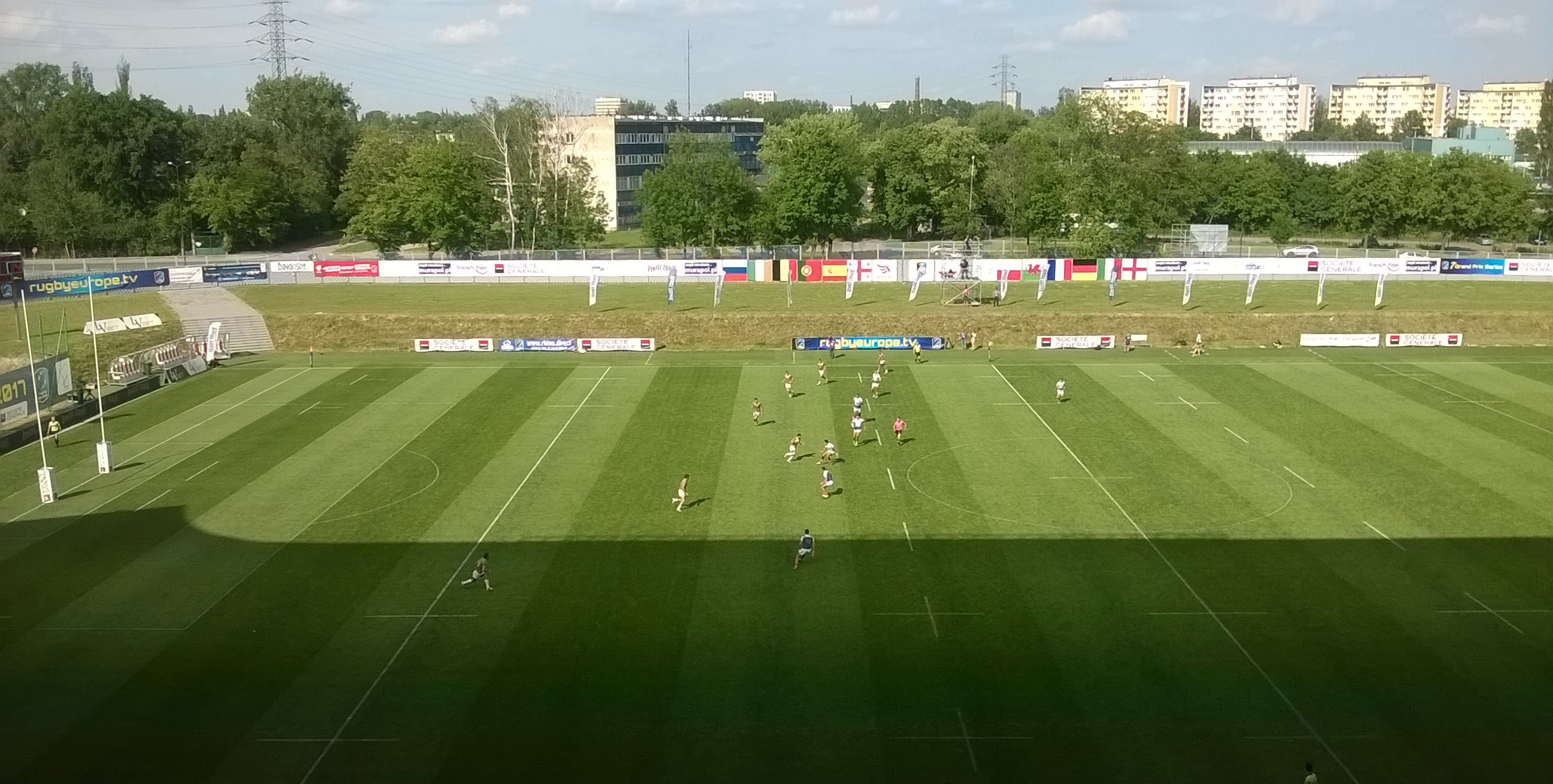
7th place match

Quarter-finals
11 June 2017 – 10:00 – Stadion ŁKS
England	5
Ireland	19
11 June 2017 – 11:06 – Stadion ŁKS
Georgia	14
Russia	19
11 June 2017 – 10:22 – Stadion ŁKS
France	21
Spain	22
11 June 2017 – 10:44 – Stadion ŁKS
Germany	7
Wales	26

Semi-finals
11 June 2017 – 12:45 – Stadion ŁKS
England	22
Georgia	12
11 June 2017 – 13:07 – Stadion ŁKS
France	14
Germany	15

Final
11 June 2017 – 16:31 – Stadion ŁKS
England	26
Germany	29
Third place
11 June 2017 – 16:09 – Stadion ŁKS
Georgia	14
France	19

=== Cup ===
Quarter-finals
11 June 2017 – 10:00 – Stadion ŁKS
England	5
Ireland	19
11 June 2017 – 11:06 – Stadion ŁKS
Georgia	14
Russia	19
11 June 2017 – 10:22 – Stadion ŁKS
France	21
Spain	22
11 June 2017 – 10:44 – Stadion ŁKS
Germany	7
Wales	26

Semi-finals
11 June 2017 – 13:29 – Stadion ŁKS
Ireland	19
Russia	26
11 June 2017 – 13:50 – Stadion ŁKS
Spain	26
Wales	17

Final
11 June 2017 – 17:18 – Stadion ŁKS
Russia	24
Spain	19
Third place
11 June 2017 – 16:53 – Stadion ŁKS
Ireland	33
Wales	5

== Overall ==
Pos	Team	Wn/Ls	Pts Dif	Pool
1	Russia	5–1	+39	C
2	Spain	5–1	+29	B
3	Ireland	5–1	+95	A
4	Wales	4–2	+27	C
5	Germany	4–2	–1	A
6	England	2–4	–27	C
7	France	2–4	+20	B
8	Georgia	2–4	+1	B
