= 2017 Moscow Sevens =

- Sevens Grand Prix Series VII
- Host nation: Russia
- Date: 3–4 June 2017

Cup
- Champion: Ireland
- Runner-up: Spain
- Third: Russia

The 2017 Moscow Sevens was the opening tournament of the 2017 Rugby Europe Grand Prix Series, hosted by Oktyabr Stadium at Moscow. It was held over the weekend of 3–4 June 2017. Ireland won the tournament, defeating Spain 12–0 in the final.

== Teams ==
- Belgium
- England
- France
- Georgia
- Germany
- Ireland
- Italy
- Poland
- Portugal
- Russia
- Spain
- Wales

== Pool Stage ==
Key to colours in group tables
Teams that advanced to the Cup Quarterfinal

=== Pool A ===
Teams	Pld	W	D	L	PF	PA	+/−	Pts
Germany	3	2	0	1	73	43	+30	7
Ireland	3	2	0	1	66	47	+19	7
Georgia	3	2	0	1	48	36	+12	7
Wales	3	0	0	3	15	76	-61	3

3 June 2017
10:00

Ireland	26-5	Wales

Oktyabr Stadium

3 June 2017
10:22

Georgia	17-12	Germany

Oktyabr Stadium

3 June 2017
12:45

Georgia	17-5	Wales

Oktyabr Stadium

3 June 2017
13:07

Germany	28-21	Ireland

Oktyabr Stadium

3 June 2017
15:30

Germany	33-5	Wales

Oktyabr Stadium

3 June 2017
15:52

Georgia	14-19	Ireland

Oktyabr Stadium

=== Pool B ===
Teams	Pld	W	D	L	PF	PA	+/−	Pts
Russia	3	3	0	0	92	17	+75	9
Italy	3	2	0	1	45	37	+8	7
Spain	3	1	0	2	52	31	+21	5
Poland	3	0	0	3	15	119	-104	3

3 June 2017
11:28

Italy	14-0	Spain

Oktyabr Stadium

3 June 2017
11:50

Poland	5-48	Russia

Oktyabr Stadium

3 June 2017
14:13

Poland	0-40	Spain

Oktyabr Stadium

3 June 2017
14:35

Italy	0-27	Russia

Oktyabr Stadium

3 June 2017
16:58

Italy	31-10	Poland

Oktyabr Stadium

3 June 2017
17:20

Russia	17-12	Spain

Oktyabr Stadium

=== Pool C ===
Teams	Pld	W	D	L	PF	PA	+/−	Pts
France	3	2	0	1	76	33	+43	7
Portugal	3	2	0	1	60	41	+19	7
England	3	1	0	2	50	65	-15	5
Belgium	3	1	0	2	31	78	-47	5

3 June 2017
10:44

Belgium	10-19	England

Oktyabr Stadium

3 June 2017
11:06

France	10-12	Portugal

Oktyabr Stadium

3 June 2017
13:29

England	10-29	Portugal

Oktyabr Stadium

3 June 2017
13:51

Belgium	0-40	France

Oktyabr Stadium

3 June 2017
16:14

England	21-26	France

Oktyabr Stadium

3 June 2017
16:36

Belgium	21-19	Portugal

Oktyabr Stadium

== Knockout stage ==
=== Challenge Trophy ===
Semi-finals
4 June 2017 – 11:28 – Oktyabr Stadium
England	24
Poland	10
4 June 2017 – 11:50 – Oktyabr Stadium
Wales	24
Belgium	5

Final
4 June 2017 – 15:05 – Oktyabr Stadium
England	21
Wales	17
Third place
4 June 2017 – 14:43 – Oktyabr Stadium
Poland	7
Belgium	24

=== 5th Place ===
Quarter-finals
4 June 2017 – 10:00 – Oktyabr Stadium
Germany	14
Spain	19
4 June 2017 – 11:06 – Oktyabr Stadium
Italy	28
France	19
4 June 2017 – 10:22 – Oktyabr Stadium
Russia	22
Georgia	14
4 June 2017 – 10:44 – Oktyabr Stadium
Portugal	17
Ireland	19

Semi-finals
4 June 2017 – 13:15 – Oktyabr Stadium
Germany	5
France	35
4 June 2017 – 13:37 – Oktyabr Stadium
Georgia	5
Portugal	14

Final
4 June 2017 – 16:24 – Oktyabr Stadium
France	33
Portugal	21
Third place
4 June 2017 – 16:02 – Oktyabr Stadium
Germany	14
Georgia	12

=== Cup ===
Quarter-finals
4 June 2017 – 10:00 – Oktyabr Stadium
Germany	14
Spain	19
4 June 2017 – 11:06 – Oktyabr Stadium
Italy	28
France	19
4 June 2017 – 10:22 – Oktyabr Stadium
Russia	22
Georgia	14
4 June 2017 – 10:44 – Oktyabr Stadium
Portugal	17
Ireland	19

Semi-finals
4 June 2017 – 13:59 – Oktyabr Stadium
Spain	26
Italy	7
4 June 2017 – 14:21 – Oktyabr Stadium
Russia	21
Ireland	28

Final
4 June 2017 – 17:14 – Oktyabr Stadium
Spain	0
Ireland	12
Third place
4 June 2017 – 16:52 – Oktyabr Stadium
Italy	12
Russia	31

== Overall ==
Pos	Team	Wn/Ls	Pts Dif	Pool
1	Ireland	5–1	+40	A
2	Spain	3–3	+33	B
3	Russia	5–1	+95	B
4	Italy	3–3	–21	B
5	France	4–2	+76	C
6	Portugal	3–3	+14	C
7	Germany	3–3	–3	A
8	Georgia	2–4	–7	A
