= 2017 Clermont-Ferrand Sevens =

- Sevens Grand Prix Series VII
- Host nation: France
- Date: 1–2 July 2017

Cup
- Champion: Ireland
- Runner-up: Russia
- Third: Spain

The 2017 Clermont-Ferrand Sevens is the penultimate tournament of the 2017 Rugby Europe Grand Prix Series, hosted by Stade Gabriel Montpied at Clermont-Ferrand. It was held over the weekend of 1–2 July 2017. Ireland won the tournament, defeating Russia 17-14 in the final. With the tournament's conclusion, the two countries, as well as Spain, remain in the mix for qualification at the 2018 Rugby World Cup Sevens.

== Teams ==
- Belgium
- England
- France
- Georgia
- Germany
- Ireland
- Italy
- Poland
- Portugal
- Russia
- Spain
- Wales

== Pool Stage ==
Key to colours in group tables
Teams that advanced to the Cup Quarterfinal

=== Pool A ===
Teams	Pld	W	D	L	PF	PA	+/−	Pts
Russia	3	3	0	0	97	21	+76	9
France	3	2	0	1	93	24	+69	7
England	3	1	0	2	33	99	–66	5
Poland	3	0	0	3	24	103	–79	3

1 July 2017
10:00

Russia	41–0	Poland

Stade Gabriel Montpied

1 July 2017
10:22

England	0–43	France

Stade Gabriel Montpied

1 July 2017
12:45

Russia	17–14	France

Stade Gabriel Montpied

1 July 2017
13:07

England	26–17	Poland

Stade Gabriel Montpied

1 July 2017
15:30

Russia	39–7	England

Stade Gabriel Montpied

1 July 2017
15:52

France	36–7	Poland

Stade Gabriel Montpied

=== Pool B ===
Teams	Pld	W	D	L	PF	PA	+/−	Pts
Spain	3	3	0	0	47	19	+28	9
Germany	3	1	0	2	51	42	+9	5
Georgia	3	1	0	2	21	31	–10	5
Portugal	3	1	0	2	33	60	–27	5

1 July 2017
10:44

Spain	26–7	Portugal

Stade Gabriel Montpied

1 July 2017
11:06

Germany	12–14	Georgia

Stade Gabriel Montpied

1 July 2017
13:29

Spain	7–0	Georgia

Stade Gabriel Montpied

1 July 2017
13:51

Germany	27–14	Portugal

Stade Gabriel Montpied

1 July 2017
16:14

Spain	14–12	Germany

Stade Gabriel Montpied

1 July 2017
16:36

Georgia	7–12	Portugal

Stade Gabriel Montpied

=== Pool C ===
Teams	Pld	W	D	L	PF	PA	+/−	Pts
Ireland	2	3	0	0	84	10	+74	9
Wales	2	2	0	1	41	49	–8	7
Belgium	2	1	0	2	41	66	–25	5
Italy	2	0	0	3	21	62	–41	3

1 July 2017
11:28

Ireland	28–5	Belgium

Stade Gabriel Montpied

1 July 2017
11:50

Wales	12–7	Italy

Stade Gabriel Montpied

1 July 2017
14:13

Ireland	35–0	Italy

Stade Gabriel Montpied

1 July 2017
14:35

Wales	24–21	Belgium

Stade Gabriel Montpied

1 July 2017
16:58

Italy	14–15	Belgium

Stade Gabriel Montpied

1 July 2017
17:20

Ireland	21–5	Wales

Stade Gabriel Montpied

== Knockout stage ==
=== Challenge Trophy ===
Semi-finals
2 July 2017 – 11:28 – Stade Gabriel Montpied
England	17
Poland	15
2 July 2017 – 11:50 – Stade Gabriel Montpied
Portugal	10
Italy	12

Final
2 July 2017 – 15:05 – Stade Gabriel Montpied
England	12
Italy	26
Third place
2 July 2017 – 14:43 – Stade Gabriel Montpied
Poland	26
Portugal	17

=== 5th Place ===
Quarter-finals
2 July 2017 – 10:00 – Stade Gabriel Montpied
Russia	12
Belgium	7
2 July 2017 – 11:06 – Stade Gabriel Montpied
Germany	26
Wales	7
2 July 2017 – 10:22 – Stade Gabriel Montpied
Spain	10
Georgia	7
2 July 2017 – 10:44 – Stade Gabriel Montpied
Ireland	7
France	5

Semi-finals
2 July 2017 – 13:15 – Stade Gabriel Montpied
Belgium	7
Wales	19
2 July 2017 – 13:37 – Stade Gabriel Montpied
Georgia	14
France	19

Final
2 July 2017 – 16:24 – Stade Gabriel Montpied
Wales	24
France	15
Third place
2 July 2017 – 16:02 – Stade Gabriel Montpied
Belgium	22
Georgia	19

=== Cup ===
Quarter-finals
2 July 2017 – 10:00 – Stade Gabriel Montpied
Russia	12
Belgium	7
2 July 2017 – 11:06 – Stade Gabriel Montpied
Germany	26
Wales	7
2 July 2017 – 10:22 – Stade Gabriel Montpied
Spain	10
Georgia	7
2 July 2017 – 10:44 – Stade Gabriel Montpied
Ireland	7
France	5

Semi-finals
2 July 2017 – 13:59 – Stade Gabriel Montpied
Russia	31
Germany	17
2 July 2017 – 14:21 – Stade Gabriel Montpied
Spain	5
Ireland	17

Final
2 July 2017 – 17:14 – Stade Gabriel Montpied
Russia	14
Ireland	17
Third place
2 July 2017 – 16:52 – Stade Gabriel Montpied
Germany	7
Spain	31

== Overall ==
Pos	Team	Wn/Ls	Pts Dif	Pool
1	Ireland	6–0	+91	C
2	Russia	5–1	+92	A
3	Spain	5–1	+41	B
4	Germany	2–4	0	B
5	Wales	4–2	–6	C
6	France	3–3	+63	A
7	Belgium	2–4	–39	C
8	Georgia	1–5	–21	B
