= Italy national rugby sevens team =

Rugby union 7s team

Italy
- Union: Italian Rugby Federation
- Nickname: Gli Azzurri (The Blues)
- Coach: Matteo Mazzantini
Team kit	Change kit

World Cup Sevens
- Appearances: 3 (First in 1993)
- Best result: 17th 1993, 2005

The Italy national rugby sevens team has occasionally competed in the IRB Sevens World Series since the series' was introduced in 1999, although they do not participate in every leg. Their first (and currently only) ever points in the World Series came in 2003, when they scored four points in the Cardiff leg of the series. Italy also competes in the Rugby Europe Sevens Grand Prix Series each summer.

Italy also plays qualifying matches for two quadrennial tournaments—the Rugby World Cup Sevens and the Summer Olympics. Italy has participated in the Sevens World Cup multiple times, but has not qualified for the Olympics.

== Tournament history ==
=== Rugby World Cup Sevens ===
Rugby World Cup Sevens Record
Year	Round	Position	Pld	W	L	D
(Scotland) 1993	Pool Stage	17th	5	1	4	0
(Hong Kong) 1997	Did not qualify					
(Argentina) 2001	Did not qualify					
(Hong Kong) 2005	Bowl Winner	17th	8	3	4	1
(United Arab Emirates) 2009	Bowl Quarter-Finals	21st	4	1	3	0
(Russia) 2013	Did not qualify					
(United States) 2018	Did not qualify					
Total	0 Titles	3/7	17	5	11	1

=== Sevens Grand Prix Series ===
Rugby Europe Sevens Record
Year	Round	Position
(Germany) 2002	Not played	
(Germany) 2003	Pool Stage	N.C.
(Spain) 2004	Runners-Up	2nd
(Russia) 2005	Third Place	3rd
(Russia) 2006	Third Place	3rd
(Germany) 2007	Sixth Place	6th
(Germany) 2008	Fifth Place	5th
(Germany) 2009	Third Place	3rd
(Russia) 2010	Seventh Place	7th
(Europe) 2011	Seventh Place	7th
(Europe) 2012	Ninth Place	9th
(France) (Romania) 2013	Fifth Place	5th
(Europe) 2014	Eleventh Place	11th
(Europe) 2015	Eleventh Place	11th
(Europe) 2016	Sixth Place	6th
(Europe) 2017	Tenth Place	10th
(Europe) 2018	Seventh Place	7th
(Russia) (Poland) 2019	Fifth Place	5th
(Europe) 2020	Not played	
(Russia) (Portugal) 2021	Seventh Place	7th
(Portugal) (Poland) 2022	Fifth Place	5th
(Portugal) (Germany) 2023	Eighth Place	8th
(Croatia) (Germany) 2024	Sixth Place	6th
(Croatia) (Germany) 2025	Third Place	3rd

=== World Rugby Sevens Challenger Series ===
World Rugby Sevens Challenger Series Record
Year	Round	Position
(Chile) (Uruguay) 2020	Ninth Place	9th
(Chile) 2022	did not Qualify	
(South Africa) 2023	Seventh Place	7th

== Current squad ==
Squad to the 2026 Rugby Europe Sevens:

- Luca Belloni (Rovigo Delta)
- Filippo Bozzoni (Calvisano)
- Simone Brisighella (Valorugby Emilia)
- Lorenzo Maria Bruno (Rovigo Delta)**
- Fabrizio Daniel CIiardullo Oro (Viadana)**
- Massimo Cioffi (Civitavecchia Rugby Centumcellae)*
- Rocco Del Bono (Livorno Rugby)
- Simone Gesi (Zebre Parma)**
- Dene Inza (Piacenza Rugby Club)
- Francesco Krsul (Rugby Rovigo Delta)
- Christian Lai (Fiamme Oro)
- Michael Mba (Fiamme Oro)
- Andrea Leon Momicchioli (CUS Torino)
- Giacomo Ndoumbe (Rugby Paese)
- Marco Scalabrin (Petrarca Padova)
- Leonardo Antonio Sodo Migliori (Fiamme Oro)
- Only for Hamburg Round
  - Only for Split Round

Squad to the 2023 European Games:

- Francesco Bonavolontà (Lazio)
- Lorenzo Maria Bruno (Lyons Piacenza)
- Massimo Cioffi (Petrarca Padova)
- Federico Cuminetti (Lyons Piacenza)
- Paul Marie Forncelli (Rangers Vicenza)
- Alessandro Fusco (Zebre Parma)
- Alessandro Garbisi (Benetton)
- Riccardo Ghelli (Rovigo Delta)
- Christian Lai (Fiamme Oro)
- Matteo Meggiato (Benetton)
- Lorenzo Pani (Zebre Parma)
- Tito Tebaldi (Petrarca Padova)
- Flavio Pio Vaccari (Calvisano)

== See also ==
- Italy national rugby union team
- Italy women's national rugby sevens team
- Rugby World Cup Sevens
- World Rugby Sevens Series
- Sevens Grand Prix Series
