= Belgium national rugby sevens team =

Belgium
- Union: Belgian Rugby Federation
Team kit

First international
- Belgium 10 - 00 Morocco (29 May 1992)

Largest win
- Belgium 66 - 00 Bulgaria (1 June 1996)

Largest defeat
- Belgium 00 - 61 Canada (2 June 1996)

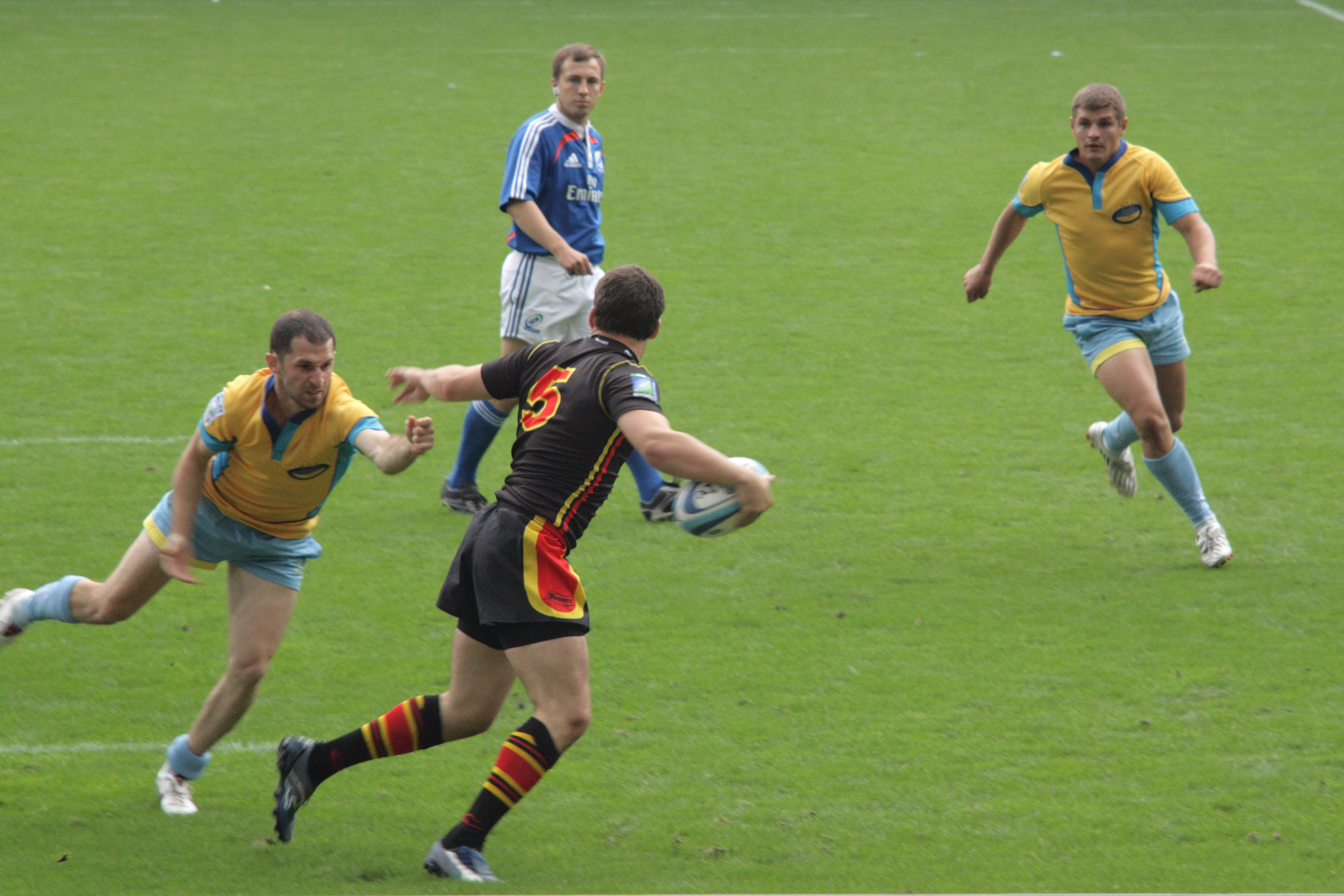
Belgium playing Ukraine in 2008

The Belgium national rugby sevens team participates in international rugby sevens competitions. Belgium competes in the SVNS 2 (officially the HSBC SVNS 2), an annual series of rugby sevens tournaments for national teams. It is the second tier of competition below SVNS, and teams on the tours of the series compete for promotion to the first tier.[1][2]

In 2014, the team participated in the Sevens Grand Prix Series, attaining sixth place which is their best result. Belgium was relegated to the 2018 Rugby Europe Sevens Trophy after the 2017 Grand Prix.
