= Rugby Americas North Sevens =

International rugby sevens competition

- Most recent season or competition: 2024 RAN Sevens
- Formerly: North America West Indies Rugby Association Sevens (2004–2008); North American and Caribbean Rugby Association (2009–2014); Rugby Americas North Sevens (since 2015)
- Sport: Rugby sevens
- First season: 2004
- No. of teams: 9–15
- Venue: No fixed venue
- Confederation: Rugby Americas North (RAN)
- Most recent champion: Canada (2025)
- Most titles: Guyana; Canada (6 titles)
- Related competitions: World Rugby Sevens Series; Oceania Sevens; Asia Sevens; Africa Sevens

The Rugby Americas North Sevens is the rugby sevens competition for the confederation of North American and Caribbean rugby. It periodically serves as the regional qualifying competition for the World Cup Sevens and the Rugby sevens at the Olympics. In the early years of the competition the tier two teams from North America (Canada, United States) did not always participate or only sent representative sides outside of tournaments for World Cup qualification (2012) or Olympic qualification (2015).

== Results summary ==
Team	Tournament results				
Team	1st	2nd	3rd	4th	Top four
Guyana	6	3	2	—N/a	11
Canada	6	3	—N/a	—N/a	9
Jamaica	5	5	2	4	16
United States	4	1	—N/a	—N/a	5
Maple Leafs (Note: Development/Representative team.)	1	—N/a	—N/a	—N/a	1
Mexico	—N/a	3	8	3	14
Trinidad and Tobago	—N/a	3	4	3	10
Bermuda	—N/a	1	2	6	9
Barbados	—N/a	1	2	1	4
Cayman Islands	—N/a	1	—N/a	2	3
United States Falcons	—N/a	1	—N/a	—N/a	1
Bahamas	—N/a	—N/a	1	1	2
United States South	—N/a	—N/a	1	—N/a	1
Martinique	—	—N/a	—N/a	2	2

== Results ==
Year	Host	Final			Third place match			Teams
Year	Host	Winner	Score	Runner-up	Third place	Score	Fourth place	Teams
2004	Georgetown, Guyana	United States	61–0; South Sound Pitch	Bermuda	Trinidad and Tobago	14–12; South Sound Pitch	Jamaica	10 (Note: Did not include Canada or Mexico.)
2005	Bridgetown, Barbados	Jamaica	22–0; Garrison Savannah	Trinidad and Tobago	Guyana	round-robin (Note: There was no third-place playoff. However, Guyana played Mexico earlier in the tournament, winning 38–0. Furthermore, Guyana's tournament point differential was +92, compared with Mexico's: –79.)	Mexico	12 (Note: Did not include Canada or the United States.)
2006	Bridgetown, Barbados	Guyana	37–0; Garrison Savannah	Jamaica	United States South	round-robin (Note: There was no third-place playoff, and the two-teams never played against each other in the event. However, the teams tournament point-differential were: United States South +20, Bermuda –31.)	Bermuda	14
2007	Nassau, Bahamas	Guyana	7–5; Winton Rugby Field	Jamaica	Trinidad and Tobago	26–14; Winton Rugby Field	Martinique	12
2008	Nassau, Bahamas	United States	21–12; Winton Rugby Field	Canada	Guyana	42–0; Winton Rugby Field	Bermuda	9
2009	Mexico City, Mexico	Guyana	12–10; Campo Marte	Trinidad and Tobago	Bahamas	28–10; Campo Marte	Martinique	13
2010	Georgetown, Guyana	Guyana	22–17; South Sound Pitch	Jamaica	Mexico	17–7; South Sound Pitch	Bahamas	9
2011	Bridgetown, Barbados	Guyana	29–0; Garrison Savannah	Cayman Islands	Mexico	7–0; Garrison Savannah	Jamaica	15
2012	Ottawa, Canada	Canada	26–19; Twin Elm Rugby Park	United States	Mexico	17–12; Twin Elm Rugby Park	Jamaica	11
2013	George Town, Cayman Islands	Maple Leafs	27–5; Truman Bodden Stadium	United States Falcons	Trinidad and Tobago	14–5; Truman Bodden Stadium	Barbados	12
2014	Mexico City, Mexico	Guyana	33–28; Campo Marte	Mexico	Barbados	17–14; Campo Marte	Trinidad and Tobago	12
2015	Cary, United States	United States	21–5; WakeMed Soccer Park	Canada	Mexico	26–19; WakeMed Soccer Park	Cayman Islands	9
2016	Port of Spain, Trinidad and Tobago	Canada	52–5; Saint Mary's College	Guyana	Jamaica	24–19; Saint Mary's College	Trinidad and Tobago	14 (Note: Did not include the United States.)
2017	Mexico City, Mexico	Jamaica	28–24; Campo Marte	Guyana	Mexico	22–14; Campo Marte	Trinidad and Tobago	10
2018	Saint James, Barbados	Jamaica	22–17; Barbados Polo Club	Guyana	Bermuda	24–7; Barbados Polo Club	Mexico	14
2019	George Town, Cayman Islands	Canada	40–5; Truman Bodden Stadium	Jamaica	Mexico	50–0; Truman Bodden Stadium	Bermuda	8
2020	Georgetown, Guyana	Cancelled due to the impacts of the COVID-19 pandemic.			Cancelled due to the impacts of the COVID-19 pandemic.			—N/a
2021	Providenciales, Turks and Caicos Islands	Jamaica	21–7; Meridian Field	Mexico	Barbados	17–12; Meridian Field	Bermuda	9
2022 (Q)	Nassau, Bahamas	Canada	29–12; Thomas Robinson Stadium	Jamaica	Mexico	21–5; Thomas Robinson Stadium	Bermuda	13
2022	Mexico City, Mexico	Jamaica	19–14 Estadio Alfredo Harp Helú	Mexico	Bermuda	19–14 Estadio Alfredo Harp Helú	Cayman Islands	11
2023	Langford, Canada	United States	24–14 Starlight Stadium	Canada	Mexico	10–7 Starlight Stadium	Jamaica	6
2024	Arima, Trinidad and Tobago	Canada	38–0 Larry Gomes Stadium	Trinidad and Tobago	Jamaica	12–0 Larry Gomes Stadium	Mexico	8
2025	Arima, Trinidad and Tobago	Canada	31–0 Larry Gomes Stadium	Barbados	Trinidad and Tobago	29–5 Larry Gomes Stadium	Bermuda	8

== See also ==
- Rugby Americas North Women's Sevens
