= 2022 RAN Sevens Qualifiers =

- Hosts: Bahamas
- Date: April 23–24, 2022
- Nations: 13

Final positions
- Champions: Canada
- Runners-up: Jamaica
- Third: Mexico

Series details
- Matches played: 35

The 2022 RAN Sevens Qualifiers are a North American rugby sevens tournament that took place at the Thomas Robinson Stadium, Nassau on 23 and 24 April 2022; they were held in The Bahamas for the third time. The defending champions from the 2021 event are Jamaica.

Thirteen teams were involved in the tournament, though the United States were notable absentees. Nonetheless, three former winners participated at the event – Jamaica, Guyana, and Canada. Owing to the postponement of the 2022 RAN Super Sevens (originally scheduled to be held in Mexico City during February 2022), this event was created specifically to maintain qualification pathways to the 2022 Rugby World Cup Sevens (top two teams), 2022 World Rugby Sevens Challenger Series and 2022 Commonwealth Games (top team not already qualified via the World Rugby Sevens Series).

== Format ==
The teams are divided into four round-robin pools and each play two matches against their pool opponents (Pool C teams play three matches). The top two sides in each pool advance to the Cup quarter-finals, from which the winners advance to the semi-finals (and final / third-place matches beyond those), while the losing quarter-finalists contest the Plate semi-finals and finals for fifth to eighth place.

The remaining teams that did not qualify for the Cup rounds compete in a Shield round-robin pool for ninth to thirteenth place.

== Teams ==
The thirteen teams competing in the Bahamas were:

- Bahamas
- Barbados
- Belize
- Bermuda
- British Virgin Islands
- Canada
- Cayman Islands
- Curaçao
- Guyana
- Jamaica
- Mexico
- Trinidad and Tobago
- Turks and Caicos Islands

== Pool stage ==
The final pool arrangements were announced on 22 April.

All times in Eastern Daylight Time (UTC−04:00)

Legend
Advanced to Cup quarter-finals
Relegated to Shield round-robin

=== Pool A ===
Team	Pld	W	D	L	PF	PA	PD	Pts
Canada	2	2	0	0	69	5	+64	6
Trinidad and Tobago	2	1	0	2	46	38	+8	4
British Virgin Islands	2	0	0	2	5	77	–72	2

April 23, 2022	Canada	36–0	British Virgin Islands	Thomas Robinson Stadium
10:06

April 23, 2022	Canada	33–5	Trinidad and Tobago	Thomas Robinson Stadium
12:44

April 23, 2022	Trinidad and Tobago	41–5	British Virgin Islands	Thomas Robinson Stadium
15:00

=== Pool B ===
Team	Pld	W	D	L	PF	PA	PD	Pts
Jamaica	2	2	0	0	68	7	+61	6
Curaçao	2	1	0	1	28	39	–11	4
Guyana	2	0	0	2	5	55	–50	2

April 23, 2022	Jamaica	34–7	Curaçao	Thomas Robinson Stadium
9:00

April 23, 2022	Guyana	0–34	Jamaica	Thomas Robinson Stadium
13:06

April 23, 2022	Guyana	5–21	Curaçao	Thomas Robinson Stadium
15:22

=== Pool C ===
Team	Pld	W	D	L	PF	PA	PD	Pts
Mexico	3	3	0	0	119	7	+112	9
Cayman Islands	3	2	0	1	83	31	+52	7
Turks and Caicos Islands	3	1	0	2	25	125	–100	5
Bahamas	3	0	0	3	26	90	–64	3

April 23, 2022	Mexico	57–0	Turks and Caicos Islands	Thomas Robinson Stadium
9:22

April 23, 2022	Cayman Islands	34–0	Bahamas	Thomas Robinson Stadium
9:44

April 23, 2022	Mexico	26–0	Cayman Islands	Thomas Robinson Stadium
12:00

April 23, 2022	Turks and Caicos Islands	20–19	Bahamas	Thomas Robinson Stadium
12:22

April 23, 2022	Mexico	36–7	Bahamas	Thomas Robinson Stadium
15:44

April 23, 2022	Cayman Islands	49–5	Turks and Caicos Islands	Thomas Robinson Stadium
16:06

=== Pool D ===
Team	Pld	W	D	L	PF	PA	PD	Pts
Bermuda	2	2	0	0	76	10	+66	6
Barbados	2	1	0	1	52	24	+28	4
Belize	2	0	0	2	0	94	–94	2

April 23, 2022	Barbados	42–0	Belize	Thomas Robinson Stadium
10:28

April 23, 2022	Barbados	10–24	Bermuda	Thomas Robinson Stadium
13:28

April 23, 2022	Bermuda	52–0	Belize	Thomas Robinson Stadium
16:28

== Knockout stage ==
=== Shield competition (9th–13th place round-robin) ===
Matches

April 23, 2022	British Virgin Islands	10–34	Guyana	Thomas Robinson Stadium
17:34

April 24, 2022	Turks and Caicos Islands	36–7	Belize	Thomas Robinson Stadium
9:00

April 24, 2022	Bahamas	26–12	British Virgin Islands	Thomas Robinson Stadium
9:22

April 24, 2022	Guyana	36–5	Turks and Caicos Islands	Thomas Robinson Stadium
12:40

April 24, 2022	Belize	24–36	British Virgin Islands	Thomas Robinson Stadium
13:02

April 24, 2022	Bahamas	21–31	Guyana	Thomas Robinson Stadium
14:52

April 24, 2022	British Virgin Islands	19–12	Turks and Caicos Islands	Thomas Robinson Stadium
16:42

April 24, 2022	Guyana	27–0	Belize	Thomas Robinson Stadium
17:04

=== Plate competition (5th–8th place playoffs) ===
Classification semi-finals
April 24, 2022 – Thomas Robinson Stadium
Barbados	17
Curaçao	14
April 24, 2022 – Thomas Robinson Stadium
Trinidad and Tobago	7
Cayman Islands	25

Fifth place
April 24, 2022 – Thomas Robinson Stadium
Barbados	14
Cayman Islands	10
Seventh place
April 24, 2022 – Thomas Robinson Stadium
Curaçao	7
Trinidad and Tobago	29

Matches

Classification semi-finals

April 24, 2022	Barbados	17–14	Curaçao	Thomas Robinson Stadium
13:24

April 24, 2022	Trinidad and Tobago	7–25	Cayman Islands	Thomas Robinson Stadium
13:46

Seventh place

April 24, 2022	Curaçao	7–29	Trinidad and Tobago	Thomas Robinson Stadium
15:58

Fifth place

April 24, 2022	Barbados	14–10	Cayman Islands	Thomas Robinson Stadium
16:20

=== Cup competition ===
Quarter-finals
April 24, 2022 – Thomas Robinson Stadium
Canada	38
Barbados	14
April 24, 2022 – Thomas Robinson Stadium
Mexico	27
Curaçao	7
April 24, 2022 – Thomas Robinson Stadium
Bermuda	7
Trinidad and Tobago	5
April 24, 2022 – Thomas Robinson Stadium
Jamaica	22
Cayman Islands	14

Semi-finals
April 24, 2022 – Thomas Robinson Stadium
Canada	41
Mexico	0
April 24, 2022 – Thomas Robinson Stadium
Bermuda	5
Jamaica	24

Final
April 24, 2022 – Thomas Robinson Stadium
Canada	29
Jamaica	12
Third place
April 24, 2022 – Thomas Robinson Stadium
Mexico	21
Bermuda	5

Matches

Quarter-finals

April 24, 2022	Canada	38–14	Barbados	Thomas Robinson Stadium
10:28

April 24, 2022	Mexico	27–7	Curaçao	Thomas Robinson Stadium
10:50

April 24, 2022	Bermuda	7–5	Trinidad and Tobago	Thomas Robinson Stadium
11:12

April 24, 2022	Jamaica	22–14	Cayman Islands	Thomas Robinson Stadium
11:34

Semi-finals

April 24, 2022	Canada	41–0	Mexico	Thomas Robinson Stadium
15:14

April 24, 2022	Bermuda	5–24	Jamaica	Thomas Robinson Stadium
15:36

Third place

April 24, 2022	Mexico	21–5	Bermuda	Thomas Robinson Stadium
17:26

Final

April 24, 2022	Canada	29–12	Jamaica	Thomas Robinson Stadium
18:10

== Final standings ==
Legend
Green fill	Qualified for the 2022 Rugby World Cup Sevens
Blue bar	Qualified for the 2022 Commonwealth Games and 2022 World Rugby Sevens Challenger Series

Pos	Team
1	Canada (Note: Already qualified for the 2022 Commonwealth Games via the 2018–19 / 2019–20 World Rugby Sevens Series.)
2	Jamaica
3	Mexico
4	Bermuda
5	Barbados
6	Cayman Islands
7	Trinidad and Tobago
8	Curaçao
9	Guyana
10	British Virgin Islands
11	Bahamas
12	Turks and Caicos Islands
13	Belize

== See also ==
- 2021–22 World Rugby Sevens Series

Rugby Americas North Sevens
Preceded by 2021 Providenciales	2022 RAN Sevens Qualifiers	Succeeded by 2022 Mexico City
