= 2009 Rugby World Cup Sevens qualifying – Men =

The qualification process of men's teams for the 2009 Rugby World Cup Sevens. Automatic qualification was extended to the host and the eight quarterfinalists of the previous World Cup. The remaining spots were contested in each of the six regions' respective tournaments.

== Qualified teams ==
Africa	North America and the West Indies	South America	Asia	Europe	Oceania
Automatic qualification
South Africa		Argentina	(Cooperation Council for the Arab States of the Gulf) Arabian Gulf (host)	England; France; Scotland	Australia; Fiji; New Zealand
Regional Qualifiers
Kenya; Tunisia; Zimbabwe	Canada; United States	Uruguay	Hong Kong; Japan	Georgia; Ireland; Italy; Portugal; Wales	Samoa; Tonga

== Qualifying ==
=== Africa ===
Key to colours in group tables
Teams that progressed to the Cup Semi-finals
Teams that progressed to the Plate Semi-finals
Teams that were eliminated from the Plate Semi-finals

==== Group A ====
Team	Pld	W	D	L	PF	PA	+/-	Pts
Kenya	3	3	0	0	88	33	+55	9
Namibia	3	2	0	1	67	55	+12	7
Uganda	3	1	0	2	57	58	-1	5
Senegal	3	0	0	3	24	90	-66	3

Date	Team 1	Score	Team 2
2008-10-31	Uganda	38-0	Senegal
2008-10-31	Kenya	31-14	Namibia
2008-10-31	Namibia	26-5	Senegal
2008-10-31	Kenya	31-0	Uganda
2008-11-01	Uganda	19-27	Namibia
2008-11-01	Kenya	26-19	Senegal

==== Group B ====
Team	Pld	W	D	L	PF	PA	+/-	Pts
Zimbabwe	4	4	0	0	86	19	+67	12
Tunisia	4	3	0	1	71	36	+35	10
Zambia	4	2	0	2	50	39	+11	8
Madagascar	4	0	1	3	51	71	-20	5
Botswana	4	0	1	3	31	97	-66	5

Date	Team 1	Score	Team 2
2008-10-31	Tunisia	26-0	Botswana
2008-10-31	Zimbabwe	14-0	Zambia
2008-10-31	Tunisia	19-0	Madagascar
2008-10-31	Zimbabwe	28-7	Botswana
2008-10-31	Madagascar	20-21	Zambia
2008-10-31	Tunisia	0-31	Zimbabwe
2008-11-01	Zambia	24-5	Botswana
2008-11-01	Zimbabwe	13-12	Madagascar
2008-11-01	Tunisia	26-5	Zambia
2008-11-01	Madagascar	19-19	Botswana

==== Plate ====
Semi-finals
November 1, 2008
Madagascar	26
Uganda	12
November 1, 2008
Zambia	17
Senegal	0

Final
November 1, 2008
Madagascar	17
Zambia	7
Plate 3rd-Place final
November 1, 2008
Uganda	19
Senegal	12

==== Cup ====
Semi-finals
November 1, 2008
Kenya	22
Tunisia	12
November 1, 2008
Zimbabwe	29
Namibia	10

Final
November 1, 2008
Kenya	26
Zimbabwe	14
Cup 3rd-Place final
November 1, 2008
Tunisia	26
Namibia	12

=== North America And West Indies ===
Key to colours in group tables
Teams that progressed to the Cup Group stage
Teams that progressed to the Plate Final

==== Group A ====
Team	Pld	W	D	L	PF	PA	+/-	Pts
United States	2	2	0	0	83	0	+83	6
Bermuda	2	1	0	1	10	36	-26	4
Mexico	2	0	0	2	5	62	-57	2

Date	Team 1	Score	Team 2
2008-10-26	Bermuda	10 – 5	Mexico
2008-10-26	United States	52 – 0	Mexico
2008-10-26	United States	31 – 0	Bermuda

==== Group B ====
Team	Pld	W	D	L	PF	PA	+/-	Pts
Canada	2	2	0	0	74	0	+74	6
Trinidad and Tobago	2	1	0	1	12	26	-14	4
Bahamas	2	0	0	2	0	60	-60	2

Date	Team 1	Score	Team 2
2008-10-26	Trinidad and Tobago	12 - 0	Bahamas
2008-10-26	Canada	48 - 0	Bahamas
2008-10-26	Canada	26 - 0	Trinidad and Tobago

==== Group C ====
Team	Pld	W	D	L	PF	PA	+/-	Pts
Guyana	2	2	0	0	44	0	+44	6
Cayman Islands	2	1	0	1	27	10	-17	4
Barbados	2	0	0	2	0	61	-61	2

Date	Team 1	Score	Team 2
2008-10-26	Cayman Islands	27 - 0	Barbados
2008-10-26	Guyana	34 - 0	Barbados
2008-10-26	Guyana	10 - 0	Cayman Islands

==== Plate ====
Team	Pld	W	D	L	PF	PA	+/-	Pts
Bahamas	2	2	0	0	36	10	+26	6
Mexico	2	1	0	1	10	17	-7	4
Barbados	2	0	0	2	5	24	-19	2

Date	Team 1	Score	Team 2
2008-10-27	Bahamas	17 - 5	Mexico
2008-10-27	Mexico	5 - 0	Barbados
2008-10-27	Bahamas	19 - 5	Barbados

Key to colours in group tables
Teams that progressed to the Cup Semi-finals
Teams that were eliminated from the Cup Semi-finals

==== Cup Group stage ====
===== Group A =====
Team	Pld	W	D	L	PF	PA	+/-	Pts
United States	2	2	0	0	76	7	+69	6
Guyana	2	1	0	1	12	41	–9	4
Trinidad and Tobago	2	0	0	2	10	40	–60	2

Date	Team 1	Score	Team 2
2008-10-27	Guyana	35 - 10	Trinidad and Tobago
2008-10-27	United States	35 - 0	Trinidad and Tobago
2008-10-27	United States	41 - 7	Guyana

===== Group B =====
Team	Pld	W	D	L	PF	PA	+/-	Pts
Canada	2	2	0	0	86	0	+88	6
Bermuda	2	1	0	1	17	47	-30	4
Cayman Islands	2	0	0	2	0	58	-58	2

Date	Team 1	Score	Team 2
2008-10-27	Canada	41 - 0	Cayman Islands
2008-10-27	Bermuda	17 - 0	Cayman Islands
2008-10-27	Canada	47 - 0	Bermuda

==== Cup Knockout stage ====
Semi-finals
January 19, 2008
United States	55
Bermuda	0
January 19, 2008
Canada	42
Guyana	0

Final
January 19, 2008
United States	21
Canada	12
Caribbean Championships Final
January 19, 2008
Guyana	42
Bermuda	0

=== South America ===
Key to colours in group tables
Teams granted automatic qualification for RWC Sevens 2009
Teams that progressed to the Cup Semi-finals
Teams that were eliminated from the Cup Semi-finals

==== Group A ====
Team	Pld	W	D	L	PF	PA	+/-	Pts
Argentina	3	3	0	0	130	0	+130	9
Uruguay	3	2	0	1	57	34	+23	7
Brazil	3	1	0	2	50	73	-23	5
Venezuela	3	0	0	3	12	142	-130	3

Date	Team 1	Score	Team 2
2008-01-18	Argentina	45 - 0	Brazil
2008-01-18	Uruguay	36 - 5	Venezuela
2008-01-18	Argentina	68 - 0	Venezuela
2008-01-18	Uruguay	21 - 12	Brazil
2008-01-18	Brazil	38 - 7	Venezuela
2008-01-18	Argentina	17 - 0	Uruguay

==== Group B ====
Team	Pld	W	D	L	PF	PA	+/-	Pts
Chile	3	3	0	0	128	24	+104	9
Colombia	3	2	0	1	36	89	-53	7
Peru	3	1	0	2	41	62	-21	5
Paraguay	3	0	0	3	32	62	-30	3

Date	Team 1	Score	Team 2
2008-01-18	Chile	38 - 12	Peru
2008-01-18	Colombia	17 - 15	Paraguay
2008-01-18	Chile	57 - 0	Colombia
2008-01-18	Peru	12 - 5	Paraguay
2008-01-18	Peru	17 - 19	Colombia
2008-01-18	Chile	33 - 12	Paraguay

==== Cup ====
Semi-finals
January 19, 2008
Uruguay	29
Colombia	14
January 19, 2008
Chile	21
Brazil	12

Final
January 19, 2008
Uruguay	31
Chile	19
Cup 3rd-Place final
January 19, 2008
Colombia	5
Brazil	12

=== Asia ===
Key to colours in group tables
Teams that progressed to the Cup Semi-finals
Teams that progressed to the Plate Semi-finals
Teams that progressed to the Bowl Semi-finals

==== Group A ====
Team	Pld	W	D	L	PF	PA	+/-	Pts
Japan	2	2	0	0	72	0	+72	6
Thailand	2	1	0	1	24	41	-17	4
Kazakhstan	2	0	0	2	0	55	-55	2

Date	Team 1	Score	Team 2
2008-10-04	Japan	41 – 0	Thailand
2008-10-04	Kazakhstan	0 – 24	Thailand
2008-10-04	Japan	31 – 0	Kazakhstan

==== Group B ====
Team	Pld	W	D	L	PF	PA	+/-	Pts
Chinese Taipei	2	2	0	0	59	12	+47	6
South Korea	2	1	0	1	38	28	+10	4
Singapore	2	0	0	2	12	71	-59	2

Date	Team 1	Score	Team 2
2008-10-04	South Korea	33 – 7	Singapore
2008-10-04	Chinese Taipei	38 – 5	Singapore
2008-10-04	South Korea	7 – 21	Chinese Taipei

==== Group C ====
Team	Pld	W	D	L	PF	PA	+/-	Pts
Hong Kong	2	2	0	0	83	7	+76	6
Sri Lanka	2	1	0	1	54	36	+18	4
India	2	0	0	2	7	101	-94	2

Date	Team 1	Score	Team 2
2008-10-04	Hong Kong	52 – 0	India
2008-10-04	Sri Lanka	49 – 7	India
2008-10-04	Hong Kong	31 – 7	Sri Lanka

==== Group D ====
Team	Pld	W	D	L	PF	PA	+/-	Pts
China	2	2	0	0	52	19	+33	6
Malaysia	2	1	0	1	50	24	+26	4
Guam	2	0	0	2	12	71	-59	2

Date	Team 1	Score	Team 2
2008-10-04	China	33 – 7	Guam
2008-10-04	Malaysia	38 – 5	Guam
2008-10-04	China	19 – 12	Malaysia

==== Bowl ====
Semi-finals
October 5, 2008
Kazakhstan	0
Guam	29
October 5, 2008
Singapore	36
India	0

Final
October 5, 2008
Guam	17
Singapore	7
Bowl 3rd-Place final
October 5, 2008
Kazakhstan	40
India	19

==== Plate ====
Semi-finals
October 5, 2008
Thailand	0
Malaysia	36
October 5, 2008
South Korea	28
Sri Lanka	19

Final
October 5, 2008
South Korea	28
Malaysia	12
Plate 3rd-Place final
October 5, 2008
Thailand	29
Sri Lanka	22

==== Cup ====
Semi-finals
October 5, 2008
Japan	24
China	0
October 5, 2008
Chinese Taipei	0
Hong Kong	26

Final
October 5, 2008
Japan	12
Hong Kong	10
Cup 3rd-Place final
October 5, 2008
China	38
Chinese Taipei	5

=== Europe ===
The tournament held in Hannover, Germany on 12 and 13 July 2008, as well as being the European Sevens championship, functioned as a qualifying tournament for the world cup. The five best nations out of the twelve participating ones qualified for the Dubai tournament. Teams finished in the following order:

- Portugal
- Wales
- Georgia
- Ireland
- Italy
- Spain
- Germany
- Ukraine
- Russia
- Romania
- Poland
- Belgium

=== Oceania ===
Key to colours in group tables
Teams that progressed to the Cup Semi-finals
Teams that progressed to the Plate Semi-finals

==== Group A ====
Team	Pld	W	D	L	PF	PA	+/-	Pts
Samoa	3	3	0	0	152	12	+140	9
Niue	3	2	0	1	41	69	-28	7
Papua New Guinea	3	1	0	2	50	62	-12	5
Solomon Islands	3	0	0	3	17	117	-100	3

Date	Team 1	Score	Team 2
2008-07-25	Samoa	47 - 5	Niue
2008-07-25	Papua New Guinea	31 - 7	Solomon Islands
2008-07-25	Samoa	67 - 0	Solomon Islands
2008-07-25	Papua New Guinea	12 - 17	Niue
2008-07-25	Samoa	38 - 7	Papua New Guinea
2008-07-25	Niue	19 - 10	Solomon Islands

==== Group B ====
Team	Pld	W	D	L	PF	PA	+/-	Pts
Tonga	3	3	0	0	87	12	+75	9
Cook Islands	3	2	0	1	81	34	+47	7
Vanuatu	3	1	0	2	32	84	-52	5
Tahiti	3	0	0	3	19	89	-70	3

Date	Team 1	Score	Team 2
2008-07-25	Tonga	39 - 0	Vanuatu
2008-07-25	Cook Islands	43 - 0	Tahiti
2008-07-25	Tonga	26 - 7	Tahiti
2008-07-25	Cook Islands	33 - 12	Vanuatu
2008-07-25	Tahiti	12 - 20	Vanuatu
2008-07-25	Tonga	22 - 5	Cook Islands

==== Plate ====
Semi-finals
July 26, 2008
Papua New Guinea	31
Tahiti	7
July 26, 2008
Solomon Islands	22
Vanuatu	14

Final
July 26, 2008
Papua New Guinea	19
Solomon Islands	12
Plate 3rd-Place final
July 26, 2008
Tahiti	0
Vanuatu	24

==== Cup ====
Semi-finals
July 26, 2008
Samoa	34
Cook Islands	0
July 26, 2008
Tonga	27
Niue	5

Final
July 26, 2008
Samoa	52
Tonga	0
Cup 3rd-Place final
July 26, 2008
Cook Islands	33
Niue	15
