= 2005 Rugby World Cup Sevens qualifying =

The qualification process of men's teams for the 2005 Rugby World Cup Sevens. Automatic qualification was extended to the host and the eight quarterfinalists of the previous World Cup. The remaining spots were contested in each of the six regions' respective tournaments.

== Qualified teams ==
Africa	North America and the West Indies	South America	Asia	Europe	Oceania
Automatic qualification
South Africa	Canada	Argentina	Hong Kong (hosts)	England	Australia; Fiji; New Zealand; Samoa
Regional Qualifiers
Kenya; Tunisia	United States	Uruguay	Chinese Taipei; Japan; South Korea	France; Georgia; Ireland; Italy; Portugal; Russia; Scotland	Tonga

== Africa ==
From 25 to 26 September 2004, there were two tournaments for the North and South zones, with the champions of each qualifying.

=== North ===
Teams	Pld	W	D	L	PF	PA	+/−	Pts
Tunisia	5	5	0	0	173	5	+168	15
Cameroon	5	4	0	1	102	53	+49	13
Morocco	5	3	0	2	94	65	+29	11
Nigeria	5	2	0	3	90	74	+16	9
Ivory Coast	5	1	0	4	48	154	−106	7
Senegal	5	0	0	5	5	161	−156	5

Matches

25 September 2004

Morocco	35−0	Senegal

Tunis

25 September 2004

Ivory Coast	5−45	Nigeria

Tunis

25 September 2004

Tunisia	29−0	Cameroon

Tunis

25 September 2004

Morocco	31−0	Nigeria

Tunis

25 September 2004

Ivory Coast	5−42	Cameroon

Tunis

25 September 2004

Tunisia	38−0	Senegal

Tunis

25 September 2004

Morocco	7−12	Cameroon

Tunis

25 September 2004

Ivory Coast	26−5	Senegal

Tunis

25 September 2004

Tunisia	24−5	Nigeria

Tunis

26 September 2004

Tunisia	41−0	Ivory Coast

Tunis

26 September 2004

Cameroon	14−12	Nigeria

Tunis

26 September 2004

Morocco	21−12	Ivory Coast

Tunis

26 September 2004

Nigeria	28−0	Senegal

Tunis

26 September 2004

Tunisia	41−0	Morocco

Tunis

26 September 2004

Cameroon	34−0	Senegal

Tunis

=== South ===
==== Pool A ====
Teams	Pld	W	D	L	PF	PA	+/−	Pts
Kenya	3	3	0	0	65	5	+60	9
Uganda	3	2	0	1	50	43	+7	7
Zambia	3	1	0	2	52	38	+14	5
Eswatini	3	0	0	3	7	88	−81	3

Matches

25 September 2004

Kenya	17−0	Eswatini

Lusaka

25 September 2004

Zambia	12−14	Uganda

Lusaka

25 September 2004

Kenya	17−0	Zambia

Lusaka

25 September 2004

Uganda	31−0	Eswatini

Lusaka

25 September 2004

Kenya	31−5	Uganda

Lusaka

25 September 2004

Zambia	40−7	Eswatini

Lusaka

==== Pool B ====
Teams	Pld	W	D	L	PF	PA	+/−	Pts
Namibia	3	3	0	0	60	34	+26	9
Zimbabwe	3	1	1	1	55	24	+31	6
Madagascar	3	1	1	1	40	24	+16	6
Botswana	3	0	0	3	19	92	−73	3

Matches

25 September 2004

Namibia	33−12	Botswana

Lusaka

25 September 2004

Zimbabwe	7−7	Madagascar

Lusaka

25 September 2004

Namibia	10−7	Madagascar

Lusaka

25 September 2004

Zimbabwe	33−0	Botswana

Lusaka

25 September 2004

Namibia	17−15	Zimbabwe

Lusaka

25 September 2004

Madagascar	26−7	Botswana

Lusaka

=== Finals ===
Semi-finals
26 September 2004
Kenya	33
Zimbabwe	7
26 September 2004
Uganda	5
Namibia	19

South Qualifier Final
26 September 2004
Kenya	33
Namibia	14
Third place
26 September 2004
Uganda	24
Zimbabwe	19

== North America and the West Indies ==
Ten teams competed in the 2004 NAWIRA Sevens for a spot in the World Cup.

=== Pool A ===
Teams	Pld	W	D	L	PF	PA	+/−	Pts
United States	4	4	0	0	169	7	+162	12
Jamaica	4	2	1	1	70	36	+34	9
Barbados	4	2	1	1	48	44	+4	9
Bahamas	4	1	0	3	12	86	−74	6
Cayman Islands	4	0	0	4	10	136	−126	4

Matches

United States	47−0	Bahamas

Cayman Islands

Jamaica	5−5	Barbados

Cayman Islands

Cayman Islands	5−12	Bahamas

Cayman Islands

United States	34−0	Barbados

Cayman Islands

Jamaica	36−0	Cayman Islands

Cayman Islands

Barbados	12−0	Bahamas

Cayman Islands

United States	57−0	Cayman Islands

Cayman Islands

Jamaica	22−0	Bahamas

Cayman Islands

Cayman Islands	5−31	Barbados

Cayman Islands

United States	31−7	Jamaica

Cayman Islands

=== Pool B ===
Teams	Pld	W	D	L	PF	PA	+/−	Pts
Trinidad and Tobago	4	3	1	0	99	14	+85	11
Bermuda	4	3	1	0	119	35	+84	11
Guyana	4	2	0	2	87	36	+51	8
Saint Vincent and the Grenadines	4	1	0	3	29	142	−113	6
Saint Lucia	4	0	0	4	26	133	−107	4

Matches

Trinidad and Tobago	40−0	Saint Vincent and the Grenadines

Cayman Islands

Bermuda	43−7	Saint Lucia

Cayman Islands

Guyana	40−5	Saint Vincent and the Grenadines

Cayman Islands

Trinidad and Tobago	40−7	Saint Lucia

Cayman Islands

Bermuda	19−14	Guyana

Cayman Islands

Saint Lucia	12−17	Saint Lucia

Cayman Islands

Trinidad and Tobago	12−0	Guyana

Cayman Islands

Bermuda	−	Saint Vincent and the Grenadines

Cayman Islands

Guyana	33−0	Saint Lucia

Cayman Islands

Trinidad and Tobago	7−7	Bermuda

Cayman Islands

==== Shield ====
Final
Cayman Islands	21
Saint Lucia	12

==== Plate ====
Semi-finals
Barbados	27
Saint Vincent and the Grenadines	7
Bahamas	7
Guyana	22

Plate
Barbados	15
Guyana	29
Bowl
Saint Vincent and the Grenadines	7
Bahamas	21

==== Cup ====
Semi-finals
United States	31
Trinidad and Tobago	0
Jamaica	7
Bermuda	17

Cup/Qualifier Final
United States	61
Bermuda	0
Third place
Trinidad and Tobago	14
Jamaica	12

== South America ==
On 24–25 January 2004, seven nations took part in the CONSUR Sevens tournament to determine the one spot for the World Cup.

=== Pool A ===
Teams	Pld	W	D	L	PF	PA	+/−	Pts
Brazil	3	3	0	0	65	14	+51	9
Paraguay	3	1	1	1	77	52	+25	6
Peru	3	1	1	1	50	55	−5	6
Colombia	3	0	0	3	14	85	−71	3

Matches

24 January 2004

Brazil	24−0	Colombia

Viña del Mar

24 January 2004

Brazil	22−7	Peru

Viña del Mar

24 January 2004

Paraguay	44−7	Colombia

Viña del Mar

24 January 2004

Brazil	19−7	Paraguay

Viña del Mar

24 January 2004

Paraguay	26−26	Peru

Viña del Mar

24 January 2004

Peru	17−7	Colombia

Viña del Mar

=== Pool B ===
Teams	Pld	W	D	L	PF	PA	+/−	Pts
Uruguay	2	2	0	0	55	5	+50	6
Chile	2	1	0	1	48	17	+31	4
Venezuela	2	0	0	2	0	81	−81	2

Matches

24 January 2004

Uruguay	38−0	Venezuela

Viña del Mar

24 January 2004

Uruguay	17−5	Chile

Viña del Mar

24 January 2004

Chile	43−0	Venezuela

Viña del Mar

=== Knockout round ===
==== Fifth Place ====
Final
25 January 2004
Peru	12
Venezuela	26

==== Plate ====
Semi-finals
25 January 2004
Brazil	14
Chile	22
25 January 2004
Paraguay	0
Uruguay	17

Qualifier Final
25 January 2004
Chile	7
Uruguay	22

== Asia ==
From 10 to 11 September 2004, twelve teams competed in Sri Lanka for three spots in the World Cup.

== Europe ==
From 16 to 17 July 2004, sixteen teams participated in the FIRA-AER European Sevens, where seven of the top placing teams qualified.

== Oceania ==
In the 6–7 February Wellington Sevens of the 2003–04 World Sevens Series, Cook Islands, Niue, Papua New Guinea and Tonga contested the one remaining Oceania qualifying slot by placing the highest of the four. Tonga won by placing in the Plate Final.
