= Rugby at the 2010 Central American and Caribbean Games =

- Dates: 24-30 July

The Rugby competition at the 2010 Central American and Caribbean Games was a two-day tournament featuring eight national sevens teams representing countries in that region.

Although the Games were being hosted by Mayagüez, Puerto Rico, the sevens tournament was held in Guyana at Providence Stadium in Providence. All pool matches were held on 24 July. The second day on 25 July featured all eight teams playing in quarterfinals, with the winners advancing to the medal round and the losers entering a "Plate" consolation bracket. Both the medal round and Plate were knockout tournaments with a consolation match for the semifinal losers.

== Pool stages ==
=== Pool A ===
Team	Pld	W	D	L	PF	PA	+/-	Pts
Guyana	3	3	0	0	113	7	+106	9
Bahamas	3	2	0	1	48	38	+10	7
Cayman Islands	3	1	0	2	26	67	−41	5
Costa Rica	3	0	0	3	24	99	−75	3

Date	Team 1	Score	Team 2
2010-07-24	Cayman Islands	21–12	Costa Rica
2010-07-24	Guyana	21–7	Bahamas
2010-07-24	Bahamas	24–12	Costa Rica
2010-07-24	Guyana	38–0	Cayman Islands
2010-07-24	Bahamas	17–5	Cayman Islands
2010-07-24	Guyana	54–0	Costa Rica

=== Pool B ===
Team	Pld	W	D	L	PF	PA	+/-	Pts
Trinidad and Tobago	3	2	1	0	39	12	+27	8
Mexico	3	1	1	1	17	29	−12	6
Jamaica	3	0	2	1	17	19	−2	5
Venezuela	3	0	2	1	24	37	−13	5

Date	Team 1	Score	Team 2
2010-07-24	Jamaica	5–7	Mexico
2010-07-24	Venezuela	7–20	Trinidad and Tobago
2010-07-24	Trinidad and Tobago	14–0	Mexico
2010-07-24	Venezuela	7–7	Jamaica
2010-07-24	Trinidad and Tobago	5–5	Jamaica
2010-07-24	Venezuela	10–10	Mexico

=== Plate round (5–8th place) ===
Quarter-finals
July 25 – Providence
Guyana	28
Venezuela	7
July 25 – Providence
Cayman Islands	0
Mexico	14
July 25 – Providence
Jamaica	15
Bahamas	0
July 25 – Providence
Trinidad and Tobago	33
Costa Rica	5

Semi-finals
July 25 – Providence
Venezuela	24
Cayman Islands	10
July 25 – Providence
Bahamas	26
Costa Rica	0

Final
July 25 – Providence
Venezuela	15
Bahamas	26
Third place
July 25 – Providence
Cayman Islands	38
Costa Rica	0

=== Medal round ===
Quarter-finals
July 25 – Providence
Guyana	28
Venezuela	7
July 25 – Providence
Cayman Islands	0
Mexico	14
July 25 – Providence
Jamaica	15
Bahamas	0
July 25 – Providence
Trinidad and Tobago	33
Costa Rica	5

Semi-finals
July 25 – Providence
Guyana	31
Mexico	0
July 25 – Providence
Jamaica	21
Trinidad and Tobago	10

Final
July 25 – Providence
Guyana	31
Jamaica	7
Third place
July 25 – Providence
Mexico	10
Trinidad and Tobago	5
