= 2015 NACRA Sevens =

- Hosts: United States
- Date: 13–14 June
- Nations: United States; Bahamas; Barbados; Canada; Cayman Islands; Guyana; Jamaica; Mexico; Trinidad and Tobago

Final positions
- Champions: United States
- Runners-up: Canada
- Third: Mexico

The 2015 NACRA Sevens was an Olympic qualification tournament for Rugby sevens at the 2016 Summer Olympics held in the United States at WakeMed Soccer Park in Cary, North Carolina on 13–14 June 2015. The teams were split into two groups. The top two teams in each group advanced to the semi-finals. The winning team qualified directly to the Olympics, and the second and third placed teams advanced to the Olympic Qualification Tournament.

== Pools ==
Pool A
- Barbados
- Jamaica
- Mexico
- United States

Pool B
- Bahamas
- Canada
- Cayman Islands
- Guyana
- Trinidad and Tobago

Note: The team from Saint Vincent and the Grenadines was scheduled to participate in Pool A, but withdrew after their players were denied visas to enter the United States.

== Pool stage ==
The ranking of each team in each group was determined as follows:

1. higher win percentage in all group matches;
2. points obtained in all group matches;
3. most of wins (including Overtime Wins) in all group matches;
4. highest points difference in all group matches;
5. lowest points against in all group matches;

Key to colours in group tables
Teams that advanced to the Cup Semifinal

=== Pool A ===
Teams	Pld	W	D	L	PF	PA	+/−	Pts
United States	3	3	0	0	144	5	+139	9
Mexico	3	2	0	1	57	55	+2	6
Jamaica	3	1	0	2	38	90	–52	3
Barbados	3	0	0	3	26	115	–89	0

13 June 2015
11:00

Barbados	26–28	Jamaica

WakeMed Soccer Park, Cary

13 June 2015
13:22

Mexico	24–5	Jamaica

WakeMed Soccer Park, Cary

13 June 2015
15:44

United States	54–0	Barbados

WakeMed Soccer Park, Cary

13 June 2015
18:06

United States	50–0	Mexico

WakeMed Soccer Park, Cary

14 June 2015
9:00

United States	40–5	Jamaica

WakeMed Soccer Park, Cary

14 June 2015
9:00

Mexico	33–0	Barbados

WakeMed Soccer Park, Cary

=== Pool B ===
Teams	Pld	W	D	L	PF	PA	+/−	Pts
Canada	4	4	0	0	170	7	+163	12
Cayman Islands	4	3	0	1	57	67	–10	9
Guyana	4	2	0	2	79	89	–10	6
Bahamas	4	1	0	3	52	123	–71	3
Trinidad and Tobago	4	0	0	4	24	96	–72	0

13 June 2015
11:22

Guyana	38–19	Bahamas

WakeMed Soccer Park, Cary

13 June 2015
11:22

Trinidad and Tobago	0–15	Cayman Islands

WakeMed Soccer Park, Cary

13 June 2015
13:44

Canada	45–0	Bahamas

WakeMed Soccer Park, Cary

13 June 2015
13:44

Guyana	12–14	Cayman Islands

WakeMed Soccer Park, Cary

13 June 2015
16:06

Canada	38–7	Trinidad and Tobago

WakeMed Soccer Park, Cary

13 June 2015
16:06

Cayman Islands	28–19	Bahamas

WakeMed Soccer Park, Cary

13 June 2015
18:28

Canada	51–0	Guyana

WakeMed Soccer Park, Cary

13 June 2015
18:28

Trinidad and Tobago	12–14	Bahamas

WakeMed Soccer Park, Cary

14 June 2015
9:22

Canada	36–0	Cayman Islands

WakeMed Soccer Park, Cary

14 June 2015
9:22

Guyana	29–5	Trinidad and Tobago

WakeMed Soccer Park, Cary

== Placement stage ==
=== Fifth to eighth ===
Semi-finals
14 June 2015 - 11:45 - WakeMed Soccer Park
Guyana	29
Barbados	5
14 June 2015 - 12:07 - WakeMed Soccer Park
Jamaica	17
Bahamas	0

Final
14 June 2015 - 15:58 - WakeMed Soccer Park
Guyana	19
Jamaica	5
Third place
14 June 2015 - 15:14 - WakeMed Soccer Park
Barbados	36
Bahamas	5

=== Title playoffs ===
Semi-finals
14 June 2015 - 11:45 - WakeMed Soccer Park
United States	60
Cayman Islands	0
14 June 2015 - 12:07 - WakeMed Soccer Park
Canada	34
Mexico	0

Final
14 June 2015 - 17:34 - WakeMed Soccer Park
United States	21
Canada	5
Third place
14 June 2015 - 16:42 - WakeMed Soccer Park
Cayman Islands	19
Mexico	26

== Final standings ==
Legend
Qualified for the 2016 Summer Olympics.
Qualified for the Final 2016 Men's Olympic Qualification Tournament.

Rank	Team	W/L record
1st place, gold medalist(s)	United States	5–0
2nd place, silver medalist(s)	Canada	5–1
3rd place, bronze medalist(s)	Mexico	3–2
4	Cayman Islands	3–3
5	Guyana	4–2
6	Jamaica	2–3
7	Barbados	1–4
8	Bahamas	1–5
9	Trinidad and Tobago	0–4

== See also ==
- 2015 NACRA Women's Sevens
