= 2022 World Rugby Sevens Challenger Series – Men's tour =

Rugby sevens competition

2022 World Rugby Sevens Challenger Series
- Men's tour – Series II
- Hosts: Chile
- Date: 12–14 August 2022
- Nations: 12

Final positions
- Champions: Uruguay
- Runners-up: Georgia
- Third: Chile

The 2022 World Rugby Sevens Challenger Series – Men's tour was the second season of the second-tier global rugby sevens competition for men's national teams. It was played as a single tournament on 12–14 August 2022 in Santiago, Chile at the Estadio Santa Laura with twelve teams competing. The tournament was the qualifying event for the World Rugby Sevens Series, with the winner gaining promotion as a core team for the 2022–23 season. The tournament was won by Uruguay 7s, defeating Georgia 7s by 19–5 in the final, with Chile 7s finishing in third place.

== Teams and venue ==
Teams
Team	Means of qualification	Date qualified
Chile (host)	2021 Sudamérica Rugby Sevens	28 November 2021
Uruguay	2021 Sudamérica Rugby Sevens	28 November 2021
Georgia	2021 Rugby Europe Sevens Championship Series	27 June 2021
Germany	2021 Rugby Europe Sevens Championship Series	27 June 2021
Lithuania	2021 Rugby Europe Sevens Championship Series	27 June 2021
Hong Kong	2021 Asia Rugby Sevens Series	20 November 2021
South Korea	2021 Asia Rugby Sevens Series	20 November 2021
Jamaica	2022 Rugby Americas North Sevens Qualifiers	24 April 2022
Uganda	2022 Africa Men's Sevens	24 April 2022
Zimbabwe	2022 Africa Men's Sevens	24 April 2022
Tonga	2019 Oceania Sevens Championship	9 November 2019
Papua New Guinea	2019 Oceania Sevens Championship	9 November 2019

Venue
Country	Location	Stadium
Chile	Independencia, Santiago	Estadio Santa Laura

== Pool stage ==
All times are CLST, Chile Summer Time: (UTC-3).

=== Pool A ===
Pos	Team	Pld	W	D	L	PF	PA	PD	Pts	Qualification
1	Chile	3	3	0	0	86	21	+65	9	Advance to Quarter-finals
2	Georgia	3	2	0	1	86	43	+43	7	Advance to Quarter-finals
3	Papua New Guinea	3	1	0	2	41	67	−26	5	
4	South Korea	3	0	0	3	17	99	−82	3	

Source: World Rugby

12 August
14:45

Papua New Guinea	15–12	South Korea
	Report

Estadio Santa Laura

12 August
15:07

Chile	19–14	Georgia
	Report

Estadio Santa Laura

12 August
20:04

Georgia	41–5	South Korea
	Report

Estadio Santa Laura

12 August
20:31

Chile	24–7	Papua New Guinea
	Report

Estadio Santa Laura

13 August
12:10

Papua New Guinea	19–31	Georgia
	Report

Estadio Santa Laura

13 August
13:46

Chile	43–0	South Korea
	Report

Estadio Santa Laura

=== Pool B ===
Pos	Team	Pld	W	D	L	PF	PA	PD	Pts	Qualification
1	Tonga	3	3	0	0	67	27	+40	9	Advance to Quarter-finals
2	Hong Kong	3	2	0	1	85	24	+61	7	Advance to Quarter-finals
3	Zimbabwe	3	1	0	2	65	64	+1	5	Advance to Quarter-finals
4	Jamaica	3	0	0	3	10	112	−102	3	

Source: World Rugby

12 August
13:07

Tonga	29–5	Jamaica
	Report

Estadio Santa Laura

12 August
13:29

Hong Kong	33–12	Zimbabwe
	Report

Estadio Santa Laura

12 August
18:01

Tonga	26–17	Zimbabwe
	Report

Estadio Santa Laura

12 August
18:23

Hong Kong	47–0	Jamaica
	Report

Estadio Santa Laura

13 August
11:48

Jamaica	5–36	Zimbabwe
	Report

Estadio Santa Laura

13 August
13:24

Hong Kong	5–12	Tonga
	Report

Estadio Santa Laura

=== Pool C ===
Pos	Team	Pld	W	D	L	PF	PA	PD	Pts	Qualification
1	Germany	3	3	0	0	55	38	+17	9	Advance to Quarter-finals
2	Uganda	3	2	0	1	66	48	+18	7	Advance to Quarter-finals
3	Uruguay	3	1	0	2	78	48	+30	5	Advance to Quarter-finals
4	Lithuania	3	0	0	3	34	99	−65	3	

Source: World Rugby

12 August
12:23

Uruguay	12–26	Uganda
	Report

Estadio Santa Laura

12 August
12:45

Germany	21–10	Lithuania
	Report

Estadio Santa Laura

12 August
17:17

Uruguay	52–5	Lithuania
	Report

Estadio Santa Laura

12 August
17:39

Germany	17–14	Uganda
	Report

Estadio Santa Laura

13 August
11:04

Uganda	26–19	Lithuania
	Report

Estadio Santa Laura

13 August
11:26

Germany	17–14	Uruguay
	Report

Estadio Santa Laura

=== Ranking of third-placed teams ===
Pos	Team	Pld	W	D	L	PF	PA	PD	Pts	Qualification
1	Uruguay	3	1	0	2	78	48	+30	5	Advance to Quarter-finals
2	Zimbabwe	3	1	0	2	65	64	+1	5	Advance to Quarter-finals
3	Papua New Guinea	3	1	0	2	41	67	−26	5	

Source: World Rugby

== Knockout stage ==
=== 9th–12th place bracket ===
9th place semifinals
13 August – Estadio Santa Laura
Papua New Guinea	14
Jamaica	15
13 August – Estadio Santa Laura
South Korea	10
Lithuania	19

9th place final
14 August – Estadio Santa Laura
Jamaica	15
Lithuania	34
11th place final
14 August – Estadio Santa Laura
Papua New Guinea	40
South Korea	19

==== 9th–12th place Semi-finals ====
13 August
16:08

Papua New Guinea	14–15	Jamaica
	Report

Estadio Santa Laura

13 August
16:30

Lithuania	19–10	South Korea
	Report

Estadio Santa Laura

==== 11th place Final ====
14 August
14:38

Papua New Guinea	40–19	South Korea
	Report

Estadio Santa Laura

==== 9th place Final ====
14 August
15:03

Jamaica	15–34	Lithuania
	Report

Estadio Santa Laura

=== 5th–8th place bracket ===
5th place semifinals
14 August – Estadio Santa Laura
Hong Kong	33
Zimbabwe	5
14 August – Estadio Santa Laura
Uganda	26
Tonga	19

5th place final
14 August – Estadio Santa Laura
Hong Kong	12
Uganda	7
7th place final
14 August – Estadio Santa Laura
Zimbabwe	26
Tonga	28

==== 5th–8th place Semi-finals ====
14 August
10:44

Zimbabwe	5–33	Hong Kong
	Report

Estadio Santa Laura

14 August
11:06

Tonga	19–26	Uganda
	Report

Estadio Santa Laura

==== 7th place Final ====
14 August
16:28

Zimbabwe	26–28	Tonga
	Report

Estadio Santa Laura

==== 5th place Final ====
14 August
16:53

Hong Kong	12–7	Uganda
	Report

Estadio Santa Laura

=== Cup bracket ===
Quarter-finals
13 August – Estadio Santa Laura
Hong Kong	14
Georgia	19
13 August – Estadio Santa Laura
Chile	24
Zimbabwe	0
13 August – Estadio Santa Laura
Germany	17
Uganda	14
13 August – Estadio Santa Laura
Tonga	12
Uruguay	17

Semi-finals
14 August – Estadio Santa Laura
Georgia	31
Chile	14
14 August – Estadio Santa Laura
Germany	15
Uruguay	19

Final
14 August – Estadio Santa Laura
Georgia	5
Uruguay	19
Third place
14 August – Estadio Santa Laura
Chile	14
Germany	12

==== Cup Quarter-finals ====
13 August
17:50

Hong Kong	14–19	Georgia
	Report

Estadio Santa Laura

13 August
18:15

Germany	17–14	Uganda
	Report

Estadio Santa Laura

13 August
20:02

Tonga	12–17	Uruguay
	Report

Estadio Santa Laura

13 August
20:30

Chile	24–0	Zimbabwe
	Report

Estadio Santa Laura

==== Cup Semi-finals ====
14 August
12:48

Chile	14–31	Georgia
	Report

Estadio Santa Laura

14 August
12:23

Uruguay	19–15	Germany
	Report

Estadio Santa Laura

==== Third place play-off ====
14 August
14:38

Chile	14–12	Germany
	Report

Estadio Santa Laura

==== Cup Final ====
14 August
19:20

Georgia	5–19	Uruguay
	Report

Estadio Santa Laura

== Placings ==
The final placings are listed below, the winner being promoted as a core team for the 2022–23 World Rugby Sevens Series:

Pos	Team
1	Uruguay
2	Georgia
3	Chile
4	Germany
5	Hong Kong
6	Uganda
7	Tonga
8	Zimbabwe
9	Lithuania
10	Jamaica
11	Papua New Guinea
12	South Korea

Key: Core team for the World Rugby Sevens Series in 2022–23.

== See also ==
- 2022 World Rugby Sevens Challenger Series – Women's tour
