= 2021 RAN Sevens =

- Host nation: Providenciales
- Date: 16–17 October

Cup
- Champion: Jamaica
- Runner-up: Mexico
- Third: Barbados

The 2021 RAN Sevens was the 21st edition of the tournament. The event was hosted by the Turks and Caicos Islands at the Meridian Field from 16 to 17 October. Those competing will have an opportunity to secure a place at the 2022 World Rugby Sevens Challenger Series. The winner of the 2022 Challenger Series will compete at the World Rugby Sevens Series as the 16th core team. Jamaica defeated Mexico in the final 21–7 and were crowned 2021 Champions. Belize made their debut at a World Rugby tournament. There was initially supposed to be 11 teams competing but the Cayman Islands and the Dominican Republic withdrew.

== Teams ==
The following nine teams competed:

- Jamaica
- British Virgin Islands
- Turks and Caicos Islands
- Mexico
- Barbados
- Curaçao
- Guyana
- Bermuda
- Belize

== Pool stage ==
=== Pool A ===
Team	Pld	W	D	L	PF	PA	PD	Pts
Jamaica	2	2	0	0	55	12	43	6
British Virgin Islands	2	1	0	1	26	46	-20	4
Turks and Caicos Islands	2	0	0	2	20	43	-23	2

October 16
11:00 AM (EST)

Jamaica	24–5	Turks and Caicos Islands

Meridian Field, Providenciales, Turks and Caicos Islands

October 16
13:15 PM (EST)

Jamaica	31–7	British Virgin Islands

Meridian Field, Providenciales, Turks and Caicos Islands

October 16
15:15 PM (EST)

Turks and Caicos Islands	15–19	British Virgin Islands

Meridian Field, Providenciales, Turks and Caicos Islands

=== Pool B ===
Team	Pld	W	D	L	PF	PA	PD	Pts
Mexico	2	2	0	0	55	19	36	6
Barbados	2	1	0	1	43	29	14	4
Curaçao	2	0	0	2	7	57	-50	2

October 16
11:30 AM (EST)

Mexico	33–0	Curaçao

Meridian Field, Providenciales, Turks and Caicos Islands

October 16
13:45 PM (EST)

Mexico	22–19	Barbados

Meridian Field, Providenciales, Turks and Caicos Islands

October 16
15:45 PM (EST)

Curaçao	7–24	Barbados

Meridian Field, Providenciales, Turks and Caicos Islands

=== Pool C ===
Team	Pld	W	D	L	PF	PA	PD	Pts
Bermuda	2	2	0	0	53	7	46	6
Guyana	2	1	0	1	43	20	23	4
Belize	2	0	0	2	5	74	-69	2

October 16
12:00 PM (EST)

Guyana	36–5	Belize

Meridian Field, Providenciales, Turks and Caicos Islands

October 16
14:15 PM (EST)

Bermuda	15–7	Guyana

Meridian Field, Providenciales, Turks and Caicos Islands

October 16
16:15 PM (EST)

Belize	0–38	Bermuda

Meridian Field, Providenciales, Turks and Caicos Islands

== Knockout stage ==
=== Plate Playoffs ===
Team	Pld	W	D	L	PF	PA	PD	Pts
Turks and Caicos Islands	2	2	0	0	39	7	32	6
Curaçao	2	1	0	1	52	17	35	4
Belize	2	0	0	2	0	67	-67	2

October 17
09:30 AM (EST)

Turks and Caicos Islands	17–7	Curaçao

Meridian Field, Providenciales, Turks and Caicos Islands

October 17
11:30 AM (EST)

Curaçao	45–0	Belize

Meridian Field, Providenciales, Turks and Caicos Islands

October 17
13:30 PM (EST)

Turks and Caicos Islands	22–0	Belize

Meridian Field, Providenciales, Turks and Caicos Islands

=== Pool 1 ===
Team	Pld	W	D	L	PF	PA	PD	Pts
Jamaica	2	2	0	0	45	0	45	6
Barbados	2	1	0	1	26	26	0	4
Guyana	2	0	0	2	5	50	-45	2

October 17
10:00 AM (EST)

Jamaica	24–0	Guyana

Meridian Field, Providenciales, Turks and Caicos Islands

October 17
12:00 PM (EST)

Barbados	26–5	Guyana

Meridian Field, Providenciales, Turks and Caicos Islands

October 17
14:00 PM (EST)

Jamaica	21–0	Barbados

Meridian Field, Providenciales, Turks and Caicos Islands

=== Pool 2 ===
Team	Pld	W	D	L	PF	PA	PD	Pts
Mexico	2	2	0	0	62	5	57	6
Bermuda	2	1	0	1	46	12	34	4
British Virgin Islands	2	0	0	2	0	91	-91	2

October 17
10:30 AM (EST)

Mexico	50–0	British Virgin Islands

Meridian Field, Providenciales, Turks and Caicos Islands

October 17
12:30 PM (EST)

Bermuda	41–0	British Virgin Islands

Meridian Field, Providenciales, Turks and Caicos Islands

October 17
14:30 PM (EST)

Mexico	12–5	Bermuda

Meridian Field, Providenciales, Turks and Caicos Islands

=== Finals ===
==== Plate Final ====
October 17
15:30 PM (EST)

Turks and Caicos Islands	12–24	Curaçao

Meridian Field, Providenciales, Turks and Caicos Islands

==== 5th–6th-place final ====
October 17
16:00 PM (EST)

Guyana	43–0	British Virgin Islands

Meridian Field, Providenciales, Turks and Caicos Islands

==== 3rd–4th-place final ====
October 17
16:30 PM (EST)

Barbados	17–12	Bermuda

Meridian Field, Providenciales, Turks and Caicos Islands

==== Final ====
October 17
17:00 PM (EST)

Jamaica	21–7	Mexico

Meridian Field, Providenciales, Turks and Caicos Islands

== Standings ==
Rank	Team
1st place, gold medalist(s)	Jamaica
2nd place, silver medalist(s)	Mexico
3rd place, bronze medalist(s)	Barbados
4	Bermuda
5	Guyana
6	British Virgin Islands
7	Curaçao
8	Turks and Caicos Islands
9	Belize
