= Goeldi =

Goeldi (or Göldi) is a Germanic surname. It may refer to:

- Anna Göldi (1734–1782), Swiss maidservant, executed for murder (allegedly through witchcraft)
- Craig De Goldi (born 1975), rugby player from New Zealand
- Émil Goeldi (1859–1917), Swiss-Brazilian naturalist and zoologist, father of Oswaldo Goeldi
- Lena Göldi (born 1979), Swiss judoka
- Oswaldo Goeldi (1895–1961), Brazilian artist and engraver, son of Émil Goeldi
