= De Goldi =

De Goldi is a surname. Notable people with the surname include:

- Craig De Goldi (born 1975), New Zealand rugby football player
- Kate De Goldi (born 1959), New Zealand writer
