= Sirilo Lala =

- Full name: Sirilo Lala Ragata
- Born: 29 August 1972 (age 54)
- Height: 5 ft 9 in (175 cm)
- Weight: 191 lb (87 kg)
- Notable relative: Amenoni Nasilasila (son)

Rugby union career
- Position: Utility back
International career
Years	Team	Apps	(Points)
1999–00	Fiji	5	(5)
Medal record
Men's rugby sevens
Representing Fiji
Commonwealth Games
Silver medal – second place	1998 Kuala Lumpur	Team competition

Sirilo Lala Ragata (born 29 August 1972) is a Fijian former rugby union international.

A utility back, Lala was largely a rugby sevens specialist and won a silver medal with the Fiji team at the 1998 Commonwealth Games in Kuala Lumpur. He made five appearances for the Fiji XV, scoring a try on debut against Uruguay in L'Aquila in 1999, then featuring four times at the Pacific Rim Rugby Championship the following year.

Lala is the father of former Fiji representative Amenoni Nasilasila.

== See also ==
- List of Fiji national rugby union players
