= Tyron Mandrusiak =

- School: St Laurence's College

Rugby union career
- Position: Fly-half / Fullback
Super Rugby
Years	Team	Apps	(Points)
1996–97	Reds	11	(0)
Medal record
Men's rugby sevens
Commonwealth Games
Bronze medal – third place	1998 Kuala Lumpur	Team competition

Tyron Mandrusiak is an Australian former professional rugby union player.

A St Laurence's College product, Mandrusiak was a goal-kicking fly-half and fullback. He played his rugby for Brisbane club Souths and featured for the Queensland Reds in the first two Super 12 seasons. A rugby sevens international, Mandrusiak represented Australia at the 1998 Commonwealth Games.

Mandrusiak is director of sport at St Joseph's College, Gregory Terrace.
