= Jamaica national rugby sevens team =

Jamaica
- Union: Jamaica Rugby Union
- Nickname: Crocs
- Coach: Bruce Martin
- Captain: Conan Osborne

World Cup Sevens
- Appearances: 2 (First in 2018 2022)

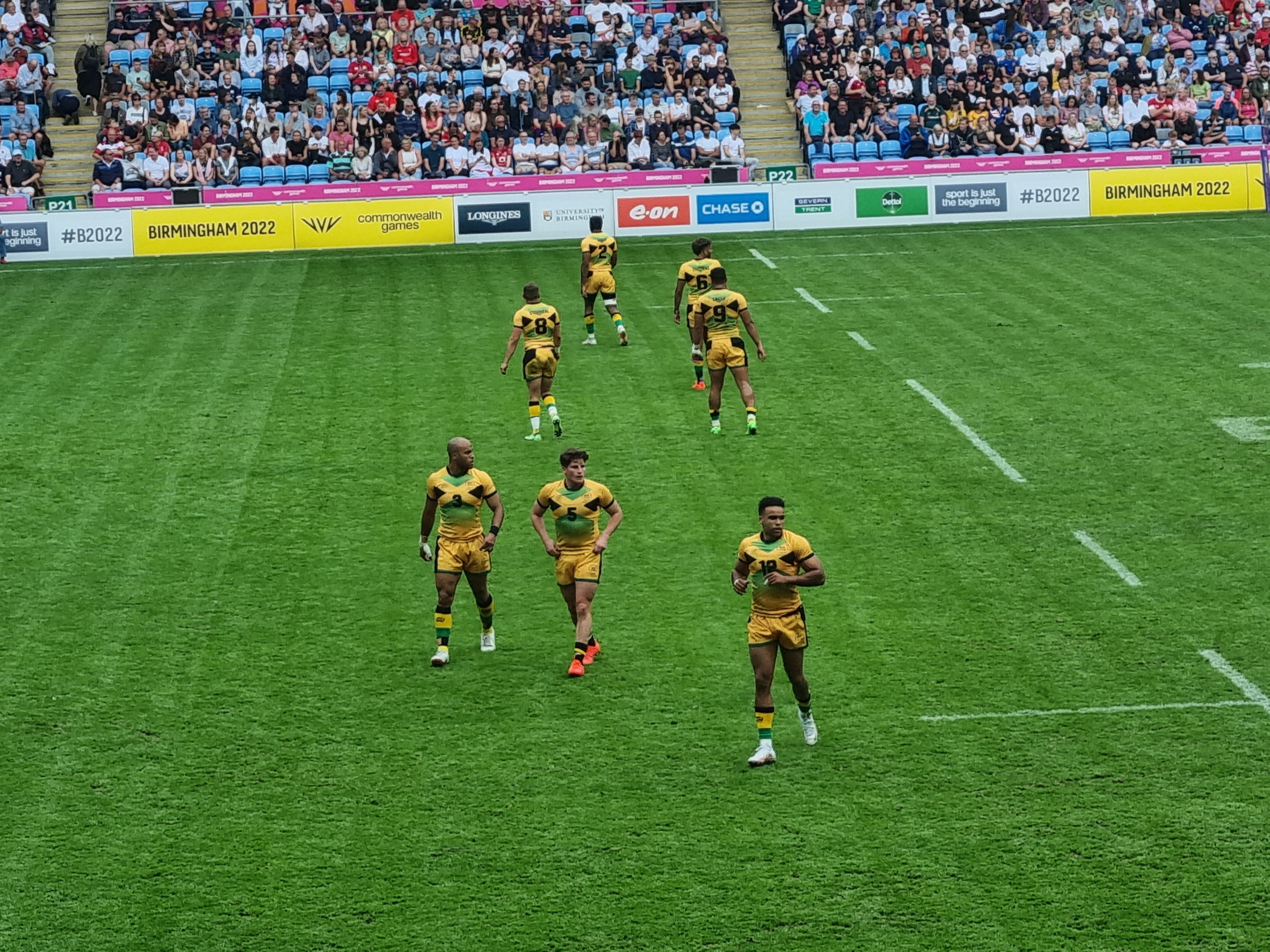
Team Jamaica at the 2022 Commonwealth Games.

The Jamaica national rugby sevens team participates in several international competitions. As champions of the 2017 RAN Sevens, they are the first ever Caribbean side to qualify for the 2018 Rugby World Cup Sevens and also participated in the 2018 Commonwealth Games. They have previously featured in Hong Kong Sevens World Series qualifying tournaments of 2013, 2017 and 2018.

Jamaica participated in the 2020 Men's Rugby Sevens Final Olympic Qualification Tournament in Monaco but did not qualify for the Tokyo Olympics. They won the 2021 RAN Sevens and qualified for the 2022 World Rugby Sevens Challenger Series.

== Tournament history ==
=== Rugby World Cup Sevens ===
Rugby World Cup Sevens Record
Year	Round	Position	Pld	W	L	D
(Scotland) 1993	Did not enter					
(Hong Kong) 1997	Did not enter					
(Argentina) 2001	Did not qualify					
(Hong Kong) 2005	Did not qualify					
(United Arab Emirates) 2009	Did not enter					
(Russia) 2013	Did not qualify					
(United States) 2018	Bowl Quarter-Finalist	24th	3	0	3	0
(South Africa) 2022	23rd Place Final	24th	3	0	3	0
Total	0 Titles	2/8	6	0	6	0

=== Commonwealth Games ===
Commonwealth Games record
Year	Round	Position	Pld	W	L	D
(Malaysia) 1998	Did not enter					
(England) 2002	Did not enter					
(Australia) 2006	Did not enter					
(India) 2010	Did not enter					
(Scotland) 2014	Did not enter					
(Australia) 2018	Pool stage	13th	3	0	3	0
(England) 2022	13th Place Playoff	13th	6	2	4	0
Total	0 Titles	2/7	9	2	7	0

=== Pan American Games ===
Pan American Games
Year	Round	Position	Pld	W	L	D
(Peru) 2019	Fifth place match	6th	5	2	3	0
(Chile) 2023	Seventh place match	7th	5	1	4	0
Total	0 Titles	2/2	10	3	7	0

=== Rugby Americas North Sevens ===
RAN Sevens record
Year	Round	Position
(Guyana) 2004	Finalists	4th
(Barbados) 2005	Champions	1st
(Barbados) 2006	Finalists	2nd
(The Bahamas) 2007	Finalists	2nd
(The Bahamas) 2008	Did not enter	
(Mexico) 2009	Plate Finalists	6th
(Guyana) 2010	Finalists	2nd
(Barbados) 2011	Semifinalists	4th
(Canada) 2012	Semifinalists	4th
(Cayman Islands) 2013	Bowl Winners	9th
(Mexico) 2014	Plate Finalists	6th
(United States) 2015	5th Place Finalists	6th
(Trinidad and Tobago) 2016	Semifinalists	3rd
(Mexico) 2017	Champions	1st
(Barbados) 2018	Champions	1st
(Cayman Islands) 2019	Finalists	2nd
(Turks and Caicos Islands) 2021	Champions	1st
