= Rugby union in Barbados =

- Country: Barbados
- Governing body: Barbados Rugby Union
- National team: Barbados
- Registered players: 1,700
- Clubs: 5

National competitions
- Rugby World Cup; Rugby World Cup Sevens; IRB Sevens World Series

Rugby union in Barbados is a minor, but relatively successful sport. There are fewer than 1700 registered rugby union players in Barbados and only five official IRB sanctioned teams. The governing body for rugby union in Barbados is the Barbados Rugby Football Union, and their headquarters is located in Wildey, St. Michael.

== History and Governing body ==
Rugby union has had a long history in Barbados, though there was originally only the one formally organised team, called the Barbados Rugby Union. In 1995 they wished to become a member of the International Rugby Board (IRB). Barbados then formed a Union with a number of clubs, three: Scorpions, Renegades and Barbados Defence Force. Since then other teams, Tridents and Emperors, have been formed. The Defence Force team is no longer active. There is also an active junior program, involving players from several secondary schools (St. Michael's School, Christ Church Foundation, Harrison College, and Garrison Secondary.) The Barbados Rugby Football Union is the recognized governing body for the sport in Barbados.

== National team ==
The Barbados national rugby union team is currently ranked 68th in the International Rugby Board's world rankings.

== Sevens team ==
The Barbados national sevens team competed at the rugby sevens event in the Commonwealth Games 2014 in Glasgow.
