= Rugby sevens at the Commonwealth Games =

International rugby sevens tournament

Rugby sevens has been played at every Commonwealth Games since its first appearance at the 1998 edition held in Kuala Lumpur, Malaysia. Rugby sevens was an optional sport that was included for 2002 and 2006; it was then made a 'Core' sport by the Commonwealth Games Federation, necessitating its appearance at all future games from the 2010 Games onward. New Zealand dominated the men's tournament at its inception until 2014 when they lost for the first time at the Games, playing South Africa in the gold medal match. 2022 marked the first time that New Zealand failed to reach the gold medal match in either the men's or women's tournaments.

Until the 2014 Games, rugby sevens was a male-only sport at the Commonwealth Games, but a female tournament was added to the programme for the 2018 Commonwealth Games in Australia. The sport will not be included in the 2026 Games.

== Editions ==
=== Men's ===
Games	Year	Host city	Host country	Medallists		
Games	Year	Host city	Host country	Gold	Silver	Bronze
XVI	1998	Kuala Lumpur	Malaysia	New Zealand	Fiji	Australia
XVII	2002	Manchester	England	New Zealand	Fiji	South Africa
XVIII	2006	Melbourne	Australia	New Zealand	England	Fiji
XIX	2010	Delhi	India	New Zealand	Australia	South Africa
XX	2014	Glasgow	Scotland	South Africa	New Zealand	Australia
XXI	2018	Gold Coast	Australia	New Zealand	Fiji	England
XXII	2022	Birmingham	England	South Africa	Fiji	New Zealand

=== Women's ===
Games	Year	Host city	Host country	Medallists		
Games	Year	Host city	Host country	Gold	Silver	Bronze
XXI	2018	Gold Coast	Australia	New Zealand	Australia	England
XXII	2022	Birmingham	England	Australia	Fiji	New Zealand

== All-time medal table ==
Medals table for rugby sevens at the Commonwealth Games (first competed for in 1998).

Updated after the 2022 Commonwealth Games

Men's tournament
Pos.	Country	1st place, gold medalist(s)	2nd place, silver medalist(s)	3rd place, bronze medalist(s)	Total
1	New Zealand	5	1	1	7
2	South Africa	2	0	2	4
3	Fiji	0	4	1	5
4	Australia	0	1	2	3
5	England	0	1	1	2
Total		7	7	7	21

Women's tournament
Pos.	Country	1st place, gold medalist(s)	2nd place, silver medalist(s)	3rd place, bronze medalist(s)	Total
1	Australia	1	1	0	2
2	New Zealand	1	0	1	2
3	Fiji	0	1	0	1
4	England	0	0	1	1
Total		2	2	2	6

== Participating nations ==
=== Men ===
Nation	1998	2002	2006	2010	2014	2018	2022	Years
Australia	3rd place, bronze medalist(s)	6th	4th	2nd place, silver medalist(s)	3rd place, bronze medalist(s)	5th	4th	7
Bahamas	17th	—N/a	—N/a	—N/a	—N/a	—N/a	—N/a	1
Barbados	—N/a	—N/a	—N/a	—N/a	15th	—N/a	—N/a	1
Canada	6th	7th	7th	10th	9th	9th	7th	7
Cayman Islands	18th	—N/a	—N/a	—N/a	—N/a	—N/a	—N/a	1
Cook Islands	9th	11th	13th	—N/a	10th	—N/a	—N/a	4
England	7th	5th	2nd place, silver medalist(s)	4th	5th	3rd place, bronze medalist(s)	9th	7
Eswatini	15th	—N/a	—N/a	—N/a	—N/a	—N/a	—N/a	1
Fiji	2nd place, silver medalist(s)	2nd place, silver medalist(s)	3rd place, bronze medalist(s)	—N/a	—N/a	2nd place, silver medalist(s)	2nd place, silver medalist(s)	5
Guyana	—N/a	—N/a	—N/a	13th	—N/a	—N/a	—N/a	1
Jamaica	—N/a	—N/a	—N/a	—N/a	—N/a	13th	13th	2
India	—N/a	—N/a	—N/a	13th	—N/a	—N/a	—N/a	1
Kenya	13th	11th	9th	7th	7th	8th	7th	7
Malaysia	11th	13th	—N/a	13th	15th	13th	15th	6
Namibia	—N/a	—N/a	13th	—N/a	—N/a	—N/a	—N/a	1
New Zealand	1st place, gold medalist(s)	1st place, gold medalist(s)	1st place, gold medalist(s)	1st place, gold medalist(s)	2nd place, silver medalist(s)	1st place, gold medalist(s)	3rd place, bronze medalist(s)	7
Niue	—N/a	13th	13th	—N/a	—N/a	—N/a	—N/a	2
Papua New Guinea	10th	—N/a	—N/a	9th	11th	9th	—N/a	4
Samoa	4th	4th	7th	5th	4th	9th	5th	7
Scotland	—N/a	9th	11th	6th	7th	6th	6th	6
South Africa	5th	3rd place, bronze medalist(s)	6th	3rd place, bronze medalist(s)	1st place, gold medalist(s)	4th	1st place, gold medalist(s)	7
Sri Lanka	14th	13th	13th	13th	13th	13th	14th	7
Tonga	12th	10th	10th	11th	—N/a	—N/a	11th	5
Trinidad and Tobago	16th	13th	—N/a	—N/a	14th	—N/a	—N/a	3
Uganda	—N/a	—N/a	11th	11th	11th	9th	10th	5
Wales	4th	7th	5th	7th	6th	7th	11th	6
Zambia	—N/a	—N/a	—N/a	—N/a	—N/a	=13th	15th	2

=== Women ===
Nation	2018	2022	Years
Australia	2nd place, silver medalist(s)	1st place, gold medalist(s)	2
Canada	4th	4th	2
England	3rd place, bronze medalist(s)	5th	2
Fiji	5th	2nd place, silver medalist(s)	2
Kenya	6th	—N/a	1
New Zealand	1st place, gold medalist(s)	3rd place, bronze medalist(s)	2
Scotland	—N/a	6th	1
South Africa	8th	7th	2
Sri Lanka	—N/a	8th	1
Wales	7th	—N/a	1

== See also ==
- Rugby sevens at the Summer Olympics
