= Rugby sevens at the 1998 Commonwealth Games =

Rugby Sevens at the 1998 Commonwealth Games
- Venue: Petaling Jaya Stadium
- Location: Petaling Jaya, Malaysia
- Dates: 12 to 14 September 1998

Medalists
gold medal	New Zealand
silver medal	Fiji
bronze medal	Australia

Rugby sevens at the 1998 Commonwealth Games was the inaugural appearance of Rugby sevens at the Commonwealth Games. The rugby sevens competition was held in Petaling Jaya, Malaysia from 12 to 14 September 1998. It was at the time one of the male-only sports at the Commonwealth Games was played.

The gold medal was won by New Zealand who defeated Fiji 21–12 in the final on 14 September 1998. In the bronze medal playoff Australia defeated Samoa 33–12. Gambia and Zimbabwe withdrew before the tournament started, resulting in a re-draw of the first round matches and groups.

== Pool stage ==
=== First phase ===
Group A
Team	Pld	W	D	L	PF	PA	PD
Fiji	2	2	0	0	125	7	+118
Wales	2	1	0	1	79	54	+25
Swaziland	2	0	0	2	0	143	−143

12 September 1998

Fiji	54–7	Wales

Petaling Jaya Stadium

12 September 1998

Wales	72–0	Swaziland

Petaling Jaya Stadium

12 September 1998

Fiji	71–0	Swaziland

Petaling Jaya Stadium

Group B
Team	Pld	W	D	L	PF	PA	PD
South Africa	2	2	0	0	88	22	+66
Papua New Guinea	2	1	0	1	76	29	+47
Trinidad and Tobago	2	0	0	2	0	113	−113

12 September 1998

South Africa	29–22	Papua New Guinea

Petaling Jaya Stadium

12 September 1998

Papua New Guinea	54–0	Trinidad and Tobago

Petaling Jaya Stadium

12 September 1998

South Africa	59–0	Trinidad and Tobago

Petaling Jaya Stadium

Group C
Team	Pld	W	D	L	PF	PA	PD
Canada	2	1	1	0	72	12	+60
Samoa	2	1	1	0	73	24	+49
Bahamas	2	0	0	2	12	121	−109

12 September 1998

Samoa	12–12	Canada

Petaling Jaya Stadium

12 September 1998

Canada	60–0	Bahamas

Petaling Jaya Stadium

12 September 1998

Samoa	61–12	Bahamas

Petaling Jaya Stadium

Group D
Team	Pld	W	D	L	PF	PA	PD
New Zealand	2	2	0	0	133	0	+133
Malaysia	2	1	0	1	35	79	−44
Sri Lanka	2	0	0	2	26	115	−89

12 September 1998

New Zealand	80–0	Sri Lanka

Petaling Jaya Stadium

12 September 1998

Sri Lanka	26–35	Malaysia

Petaling Jaya Stadium

12 September 1998

New Zealand	53–0	Malaysia

Petaling Jaya Stadium

Group E
Team	Pld	W	D	L	PF	PA	PD
England	2	2	0	0	45	10	+35
Tonga	2	1	0	1	43	22	+21
Kenya	2	0	0	2	5	61	−56

12 September 1998

England	17–10	Tonga

Petaling Jaya Stadium

12 September 1998

Tonga	33–5	Kenya

Petaling Jaya Stadium

12 September 1998

England	28–0	Kenya

Petaling Jaya Stadium

Group F
Team	Pld	W	D	L	PF	PA	PD
Australia	2	2	0	0	103	0	+103
Cook Islands	2	1	0	1	60	50	+10
Cayman Islands	2	0	0	2	0	113	−113

12 September 1998

Australia	50–0	Cook Islands

Petaling Jaya Stadium

12 September 1998

Cook Islands	60–0	Cayman Islands

Petaling Jaya Stadium

12 September 1998

Australia	63–0	Cayman Islands

Petaling Jaya Stadium

=== Second phase ===
Group A
Team	Pld	W	D	L	PF	PA	PD
New Zealand	2	2	0	0	132	12	+120
Tonga	2	1	0	1	50	41	+9
Bahamas	2	0	0	2	0	129	−129

13 September 1998

New Zealand	93–0	Bahamas

Petaling Jaya Stadium

13 September 1998

Tonga	38–0	Bahamas

Petaling Jaya Stadium

13 September 1998

New Zealand	41–12	Tonga

Petaling Jaya Stadium

Group B
Team	Pld	W	D	L	PF	PA	PD
Fiji	2	2	0	0	134	5	+129
Malaysia	2	1	0	1	24	68	−44
Kenya	2	0	0	2	5	90	−85

13 September 1998

Fiji	71–0	Kenya

Petaling Jaya Stadium

13 September 1998

Malaysia	19–5	Kenya

Petaling Jaya Stadium

13 September 1998

Fiji	63–5	Malaysia

Petaling Jaya Stadium

Group C
Team	Pld	W	D	L	PF	PA	PD
Australia	2	2	0	0	129	19	+110
Papua New Guinea	2	1	0	1	61	59	+2
Sri Lanka	2	0	0	2	5	117	−112

13 September 1998

Australia	70–5	Sri Lanka

Petaling Jaya Stadium

13 September 1998

Papua New Guinea	47–0	Sri Lanka

Petaling Jaya Stadium

13 September 1998

Australia	59–14	Papua New Guinea

Petaling Jaya Stadium

Group D
Team	Pld	W	D	L	PF	PA	PD
South Africa	2	2	0	0	117	0	+117
Cook Islands	2	1	0	1	50	57	−7
Swaziland	2	0	0	2	19	129	−110

13 September 1998

South Africa	79–0	Swaziland

Petaling Jaya Stadium

13 September 1998

Cook Islands	50–19	Swaziland

Petaling Jaya Stadium

13 September 1998

South Africa	38–0	Cook Islands

Petaling Jaya Stadium

Group E
Team	Pld	W	D	L	PF	PA	PD
Samoa	2	2	0	0	104	12	+92
England	2	1	0	1	62	26	+36
Trinidad and Tobago	2	0	0	2	7	135	−128

13 September 1998

England	50–7	Trinidad and Tobago

Petaling Jaya Stadium

13 September 1998

Samoa	85–0	Trinidad and Tobago

Petaling Jaya Stadium

13 September 1998

England	12–19	Samoa

Petaling Jaya Stadium

Group F
Team	Pld	W	D	L	PF	PA	PD
Canada	2	2	0	0	92	7	+85
Wales	2	1	0	1	69	45	+24
Cayman Islands	2	0	0	2	0	109	−109

13 September 1998

Canada	47–0	Cayman Islands

Petaling Jaya Stadium

13 September 1998

Wales	62–0	Cayman Islands

Petaling Jaya Stadium

13 September 1998

Canada	45–7	Wales

Petaling Jaya Stadium

=== Final standings ===
Pos	Team	P	W	D	L
C	Australia	4	4	0	0
C	Fiji	4	4	0	0
C	New Zealand	4	4	0	0
C	South Africa	4	4	0	0
C	Samoa	4	3	1	0
C	Canada	4	3	1	0
C	England	4	3	0	1
C	Wales	4	2	0	2
P	Cook Islands	4	2	0	2
P	Papua New Guinea	4	2	0	2
P	Malaysia	4	2	0	2
P	Tonga	4	2	0	2
P	Kenya	4	0	0	4
P	Sri Lanka	4	0	0	4
P	Swaziland	4	0	0	4
P	Trinidad and Tobago	4	0	0	4
B	Bahamas	4	0	0	4
B	Cayman Islands	4	0	0	4

= Qualified for Cup
= Qualified for Plate (to determine places 9-16)
= Qualified for Bowl (to determine places 17-18)

== Knockout stages ==
=== Medal ===
Quarter-finals
14 September – Kuala Lumpur
New Zealand	38
Wales	14
14 September – Kuala Lumpur
Samoa	26
South Africa	5
14 September – Kuala Lumpur
Fiji	26
Canada	19
14 September – Kuala Lumpur
Australia	49
England	14

Semi-finals
14 September – Kuala Lumpur
New Zealand	19
Samoa	14
14 September – Kuala Lumpur
Fiji	28
Australia	14

Gold-medal match
14 September – Kuala Lumpur
New Zealand	21
Fiji	12
Bronze-medal match
14 September – Kuala Lumpur
Samoa	12
Australia	33

=== Plate & Bowl ===
Quarter-finals
14 September – Kuala Lumpur
Papua New Guinea	40
Sri Lanka	17
14 September – Kuala Lumpur
Malaysia	26
Swaziland	7
14 September – Kuala Lumpur
Cook Islands	45
Trinidad and Tobago	12
14 September – Kuala Lumpur
Tonga	35
Kenya	19

Semi-finals
14 September – Kuala Lumpur
Papua New Guinea	35
Malaysia	5
14 September – Kuala Lumpur
Cook Islands	22
Tonga	21

Plate Match
14 September – Kuala Lumpur
Cook Islands	31
Papua New Guinea	12
Bowl Match
14 September – Kuala Lumpur
Bahamas	47
Cayman Islands	17

== Medallists ==
Event	Gold	Silver	Bronze
Men's rugby sevens	New Zealand (NZL); Amasio Valence; Bruce Reihana; Caleb Ralph; Christian Cullen; Dallas Seymour; Eric Rush; Joeli Vidiri; Jonah Lomu; Rico Gear; Roger Randle	Fiji (FIJ); Aparama Bosekora; Jope Tuikabe; Alifereti Doviverata; Senirusi Rauqe; Saimoni Rikoni; Setareki Tawake; Sirilo Ragata; Tinasau Akuila; Marika Vunibaka; Waisale Serevi	Australia (AUS); Brendan Williams; Cameron Pither; David Campese; Ipolito Fenukitau; Jim Williams; Marc Stcherbina; Matthew Dowling; Richard Graham; Ricky Nalatu; Tyron Mandrusiak
