= Uganda national rugby sevens team =

Uganda
- Union: Uganda Rugby Union
- Nickname: URU
- Coach: Tolbert Onyango
- Captain: Micheal Wokorach
- Most caps: Michael Wokorach
- Top scorer: Philip Wokorach
Team kit

First international
- 2018

World Cup Sevens
- Appearances: 2 (First in 2018)

The Uganda national rugby sevens team represents Uganda at Rugby sevens.

Uganda won the Africa Men's 7s on 23 April 2022 at Kyadondo Rugby Ground. This tournament was played by 14 countries.They made their first world cup appearance after winning the 2017 Africa Cup Sevens.

In 2024, Uganda placed ninth in the first round of the Challenger Series which was held in Dubai. They finished sixth in the overall Challenger Series.

== Players ==
Squad for the 2024 World Rugby Sevens Challenger Series in Dubai.

No.	Player	Date of birth (age)
2	Pius Ogena	
3	Ian Munyani	27 October 1997 (aged 24)
4	William Nkore	7 May 1997 (aged 25)
6	Alex Aturinda	26 November 1997 (aged 24)
7	Isaac Massanganzira	
8	Desire Ayera	9 January 1999 (aged 23)
9	Aaron Oforyowth	7 October 1997 (aged 24)
10	Adrian Kasito	30 October 1995 (aged 26)
11	Timothy Kisiga	2 December 1996 (aged 25)
13	Davis Shimwa	
14	Batholomew Kizito	
15	Denis Etwau	

== Tournament History ==
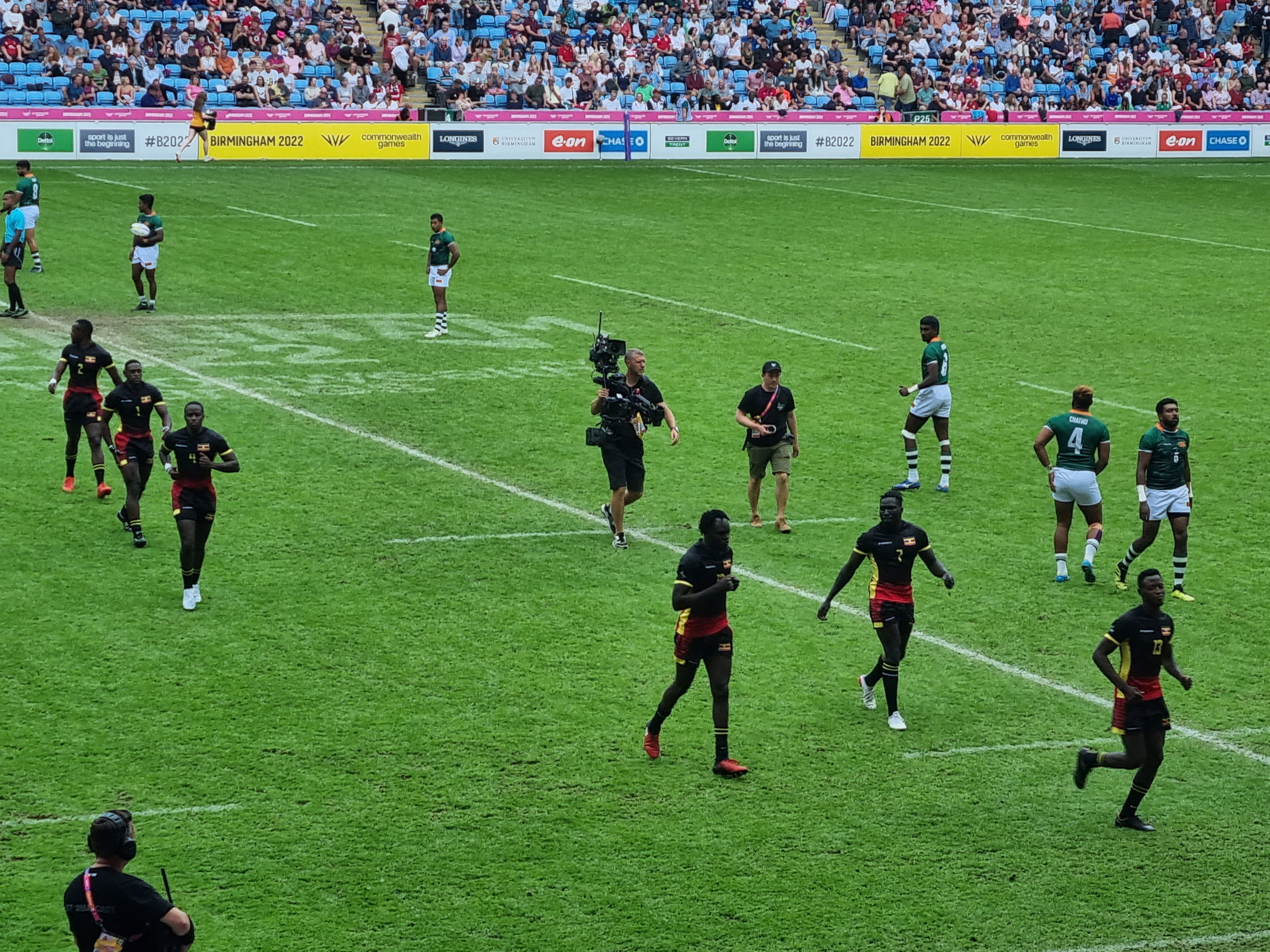
Team Uganda at the 2022 Commonwealth Games.

=== Rugby World Cup Sevens ===
Rugby World Cup Sevens Record
Year	Round	Position	Pld	W	L	D
(Scotland) 1993	Did not enter					
(Hong Kong) 1997	Did not enter					
(Argentina) 2001	Did not qualify					
(Hong Kong) 2005	Did not qualify					
(United Arab Emirates) 2009	Did not qualify					
(Russia) 2013	Did not enter					
(United States) 2018	Bowl Semi-final	19th	4	2	2	0
(South Africa) 2022	Bowl Final	17th	4	3	1	0
Total	0 Titles	2/8	8	5	3	0

=== Commonwealth Games ===
Commonwealth Games record
Year	Round	Position	Pld	W	L	D
(Malaysia) 1998	Did not enter					
(England) 2002	Did not enter					
(Australia) 2006	Bowl Semifinalist	11th	5	2	3	0
(India) 2010	Bowl Semifinalist	11th	5	2	3	0
(Scotland) 2014	Bowl Semifinalist	11th	5	2	3	0
(Australia) 2018	Group stage	12th	3	1	2	0
(England) 2022	Bowl finalist	10th	6	3	2	1
Total	0 Titles	5/6	24	10	12	1

=== Africa Sevens ===
This was an Olympic qualifier in Johannesburg.

Uganda has won the Africa Sevens tournament three times in 2016, 2017 and 2022.

== See also ==
- Uganda national rugby union team (XV)
- Rugby union in Uganda
