= Rugby union in the Bahamas =

- Country: Bahamas
- Governing body: Rugby Bahamas
- National team: Bahamas
- Registered players: 977
- Clubs: 7

Rugby union in the Bahamas is a minor, but relatively successful sport. They are currently ranked 86th in the International Rugby Board's world rankings. There are fewer than one thousand registered athletes in the country and only seven official IRB sanctioned teams.

The governing body for rugby union in the Bahamas is Rugby Bahamas, founded in 1963 and their headquarters is located in Nassau.

== History ==
The Bahamas compete in the Caribbean Championship, a tournament which includes Trinidad and Tobago, Bermuda, Martinique, the Cayman Islands, Jamaica, British Virgin Islands, Antigua and Guyana.

== See also ==
- Bahamas national rugby union team
- Bahamas national rugby sevens team
