= Rugby sevens at the 2010 Commonwealth Games =

Rugby Sevens at the 2010 Commonwealth Games
- Venue: Delhi University Stadium
- Location: Delhi, India
- Dates: 11 to 12 October 2010

Medalists
gold medal	New Zealand
silver medal	Australia
bronze medal	South Africa

Rugby sevens at the 2010 Commonwealth Games was the fourth appearance of Rugby sevens at the Commonwealth Games. Rugby sevens was one of only two sports contested only by males with no women's competition (the other being boxing). The rugby competition was held between 11 and 12 October 2010. The competition venue was the Delhi University Stadium within North Campus of the Delhi University.

Namibia withdrew and was later replaced by Malaysia. Due to the withdrawal, Uganda was shifted to Group D while Malaysia was placed in Group C.

Fiji, described as "perennial crowd favourites", was absent, due to the country being suspended from the Commonwealth following the 2006 military coup.

There were security and health concerns surrounding the 2010 Commonwealth Games, but many main competitors had confirmed their participation.

== Qualified teams ==
Continent	Qualifier(s)
Asia	Malaysia; Sri Lanka
Africa	Kenya; South Africa; Uganda
Americas	Canada; Guyana
Oceania	Australia; New Zealand; Samoa; Papua New Guinea; Tonga
Europe	England; Scotland; Wales
Host nation	India

=== Group A ===
Team	Pld	W	D	L	PF	PA	PD	Pts
New Zealand	3	3	0	0	141	7	+134	9
Scotland	3	2	0	1	45	63	−18	7
Canada	3	1	0	2	71	62	9	5
Guyana	3	0	0	3	0	125	−125	3

11 October 2010
9:44

New Zealand	43–7	Canada

Delhi University, New Delhi

11 October 2010
10:06

Scotland	26–0	Guyana

Delhi University, New Delhi

11 October 2010
12:50

New Zealand	52–0	Guyana

Delhi University, New Delhi

11 October 2010
13:12

Scotland	19–17	Canada

Delhi University, New Delhi

11 October 2010
15:54

Canada	47–0	Guyana

Delhi University, New Delhi

11 October 2010
17:32

New Zealand	46–0	Scotland

Delhi University, New Delhi

=== Group B ===
Team	Pld	W	D	L	PF	PA	PD	Pts
South Africa	3	3	0	0	109	5	+104	9
Wales	3	2	0	1	99	35	+64	7
Tonga	3	1	0	2	45	72	−27	5
India	3	0	0	3	12	153	−141	3

11 October 2010
9:00

South Africa	29–0	Tonga

Delhi University, New Delhi

11 October 2010
9:22

Wales	56–7	India

Delhi University, New Delhi

11 October 2010
12:06

South Africa	59–0	India

Delhi University, New Delhi

11 October 2010
12:28

Wales	38–7	Tonga

Delhi University, New Delhi

11 October 2010
15:32

Tonga	38–5	India

Delhi University, New Delhi

11 October 2010
17:10

South Africa	21–5	Wales

Delhi University, New Delhi

=== Group C ===
Team	Pld	W	D	L	PF	PA	PD	Pts
Kenya	3	3	0	0	69	22	+47	9
Samoa	3	2	0	1	109	29	+80	7
Papua New Guinea	3	1	0	2	85	65	+20	5
Malaysia	3	0	0	3	10	157	−147	3

11 October 2010
11:22

Samoa	38–17	Papua New Guinea

Delhi University, New Delhi

11 October 2010
11:44

Kenya	40–0	Malaysia

Delhi University, New Delhi

11 October 2010
14:48

Samoa	61–0	Malaysia

Delhi University, New Delhi

11 October 2010
15:10

Kenya	17–12	Papua New Guinea

Delhi University, New Delhi

11 October 2010
16:48

Papua New Guinea	56–10	Malaysia

Delhi University, New Delhi

11 October 2010
18:16

Samoa	10–12	Kenya

Delhi University, New Delhi

=== Group D ===
Team	Pld	W	D	L	PF	PA	PD	Pts
England	3	3	0	0	135	26	+109	9
Australia	3	2	0	1	94	26	+68	7
Uganda	3	1	0	2	35	93	−58	5
Sri Lanka	3	0	0	3	17	136	−119	3

11 October 2010
10:28

England	59–7	Sri Lanka

Delhi University, New Delhi

11 October 2010
10:50

Australia	33–0	Uganda

Delhi University, New Delhi

11 October 2010
14:04

England	55–0	Uganda

Delhi University, New Delhi

11 October 2010
14:26

Australia	42–5	Sri Lanka

Delhi University, New Delhi

11 October 2010
16:26

Sri Lanka	5–35	Uganda

Delhi University, New Delhi

11 October 2010
17:54

England	21–19	Australia

Delhi University, New Delhi

== Knockout stage ==
=== Gold Medal Bracket ===
Quarter-finals
12 October 10:38 — New Delhi
New Zealand	31
Wales	10
12 October 11:00 — New Delhi
England	7
Samoa	5
12 October 11:22 — New Delhi
Kenya	5
Australia	27
12 October 11:44 — New Delhi
South Africa	10
Scotland	7

Semi-finals
12 October 14:28 — New Delhi
New Zealand	33
England	12
12 October 14:50 — New Delhi
Australia	17
South Africa	7

Final
12 October 16:50 — New Delhi
New Zealand	24
Australia	17
Third place
12 October 16:20 — New Delhi
South Africa	17
England	14

=== Plate ===
Quarter-finals
12 October 10:38 — New Delhi
New Zealand	31
Wales	10
12 October 11:00 — New Delhi
England	7
Samoa	5
12 October 11:22 — New Delhi
Kenya	5
Australia	27
12 October 11:44 — New Delhi
South Africa	10
Scotland	7

Semi-finals
12 October 13:44 — New Delhi
Wales	12
Samoa	38
12 October 14:06 — New Delhi
Kenya	17
Scotland	22

Final
12 October 15:50 — New Delhi
Samoa	34
Scotland	0

=== Bowl ===
Quarter-finals
12 October 9:00 — New Delhi
Canada	43
India	10
12 October 9:22 — New Delhi
Uganda	26
Malaysia	14
12 October 9:44 — New Delhi
Papua New Guinea	26
Sri Lanka	12
12 October 10:06 — New Delhi
Tonga	21
Guyana	14

Semi-finals
12 October 13:00 — New Delhi
Canada	22
Uganda	17
12 October 13:22 — New Delhi
Papua New Guinea	24
Tonga	5

Final
12 October 15:22 — New Delhi
Canada	10
Papua New Guinea	19

== Medalists ==
Men's	Gold	Silver	Bronze
Men's	New Zealand Ben Smith; Benjamin Souness; Derek Forbes; Hosea Gear; Kurt Baker; Liam Messam; Lote Raikabula; Sherwin Stowers; Tim Mikkelson; Toby Arnold; Tomasi Cama	Australia Bernard Foley; Brian Sefanaia; James Stannard; Kimami Sitauti; Lachie Turner; Liam Gill; Luke Morahan; Nick Phipps; Nick Cummins; Pat McCabe; Pat McCutcheon; Robbie Coleman	South Africa Tera Mtembu; Cecil Afrika; Ockert Kruger; Renfred Dazel; Rayno Benjamin; Paul Delport; Bernado Botha; Chase Minnaar; Boom Prinsloo; Neil Powell; S'bura Sithole; MJ Mentz
