= Guyana national rugby sevens team =

Guyana Sevens
- Union: Guyana Rugby Football Union
- Coach: Conrad Arjoon
- Captain: Ryan Gonsalves

The Guyana national rugby sevens team is a minor international sevens side. They competed in the IRB Sevens World Series for the first time at the 2010 USA Sevens. Although the team was outscored 158–31 over five games, they earned a surprise 12–12 draw with World Series core member France in group play.

Guyana also qualified for the 2010 Commonwealth Games.

== Tournament History ==
=== Commonwealth Games ===
Commonwealth Games record
Year	Round	Position	Pld	W	L	D
(Malaysia) 1998	Did not enter					
(England) 2002	Did not enter					
(Australia) 2006	Did not enter					
(India) 2010	Bowl Quarterfinals	14/16	4	0	0	4
(Scotland) 2014	Did not enter					
(Australia) 2018	Did not enter					
Total	0 Titles	1/6	4	0	0	4

=== Rugby Americas North Sevens ===
RAN Sevens record
Year	Round	Position
(Guyana) 2004	Plate Winners	5th
(Barbados) 2005	Semifinalists	3rd
(Barbados) 2006	Champions	1st
(The Bahamas) 2007	Champions	1st
(The Bahamas) 2008	Semifinalists	3rd
(Mexico) 2009	Champions	1st
(Guyana) 2010	Champions	1st
(Barbados) 2011	Champions	1st
(Canada) 2012	Plate Winners	5th
(Cayman Islands) 2013	Did not enter	
(Mexico) 2014	Champions	1st
(United States) 2015	Plate Winners	5th
(Trinidad and Tobago) 2016	Finalists	2nd
(Mexico) 2017	Finalists	2nd

== Current squad ==
Squad to 2012 Hong Kong Sevens:

- Rupert Giles
- Richard Staglon
- Walter George
- Vallon Adams
- Theo Henry
- Kevin McKenzie
- Elwin Chase
- Ronald Mayers
- Ryan Gonsalves (c)
- Christopher Singh
- Claudius Butts
- Rickford Cummings

== 2010 USA Sevens ==
=== Pool A ===
Team	Pld	W	D	L	PF	PA	+/-	Pts
New Zealand	3	3	0	0	92	19	+73	9
Australia	3	2	0	1	78	7	+61	7
France	3	0	1	2	24	81	–57	4
Guyana	3	0	1	2	12	94	–82	4

Date	Team 1	Score	Team 2
2010-02-13	France	12 - 12	Guyana
2010-02-13	New Zealand	49 - 0	Guyana
2010-02-13	Australia	33 - 0	Guyana

=== Shield ===
Quarter-finals
February 14 - Whitney, Nevada, USA
France	19
Canada	12
February 14 - Whitney, Nevada, USA
Japan	7
Chile	19
February 14 - Whitney, Nevada, USA
Scotland	7
Argentina	14
February 14 - Whitney, Nevada, USA
United States	33
Guyana	12

Semi-finals
February 14 - Whitney, Nevada, USA
Canada	5
Japan	17
February 14 - Whitney, Nevada, USA
Scotland	31
Guyana	7

Final
February 14 - Whitney, Nevada, USA
Japan	7
Scotland	17

== 2012 Hong Kong Sevens ==
=== Pool F ===
Teams	Pld	W	D	L	PF	PA	+/−	Pts
Portugal	3	3	0	0	62	32	+30	9
Russia	3	2	0	1	38	36	+2	7
Japan	3	1	0	2	67	45	+21	5
Guyana	3	0	0	3	17	71	−54	3

23 March 2012
16:00

Portugal	19 – 0	Guyana
	Report

Hong Kong Stadium

24 March 2012
09:30

Russia	14 – 12	Guyana
	Report

Hong Kong Stadium

24 March 2012
14:38

Japan	38 – 5	Guyana
	Report

Hong Kong Stadium

=== Ranking Matches ===
Semi-finals
25 March – Hong Kong
China	5
Guyana	7
25 March – Hong Kong
Uruguay	22
Philippines	5

Final
25 March – Hong Kong
Guyana	0
Uruguay	31

== See also ==
- Rugby Americas North
- Rugby union in Guyana
