= Meridian Field =

Rugby stadium in Turks and Caicos Islands

Coordinates: 21°47′24.6365″N 72°10′55.8555″W

- Interactive map of Meridian Field
- Location: Village of Grace, Providenciales, Turks and Caicos Islands
- Owner: Turks and Caicos Islands Rugby Football Union

Construction
- Groundbreaking: 2001
- Built: 2011

Tenant
- Turks and Caicos Islands national rugby union team

Meridian Field is a multi-use rugby stadium in Village of Grace, Providenciales, Turks and Caicos Islands. It is currently used for rugby union.
