= Rugby sevens at the 2002 Commonwealth Games =

Rugby Sevens at the 2002 Commonwealth Games
- Venue: City of Manchester Stadium
- Location: Manchester, England
- Dates: 2 to 4 August 2002
- Nations: 16

Medalists
gold medal	New Zealand
silver medal	Fiji
bronze medal	South Africa

Rugby sevens at the 2002 Commonwealth Games was the second appearance of Rugby sevens at the Commonwealth Games.

The rugby sevens competition was held at the City of Manchester Stadium in Manchester, England, from 2 to 4 August 2002.

The gold medal was won by New Zealand who defeated Fiji in the final.

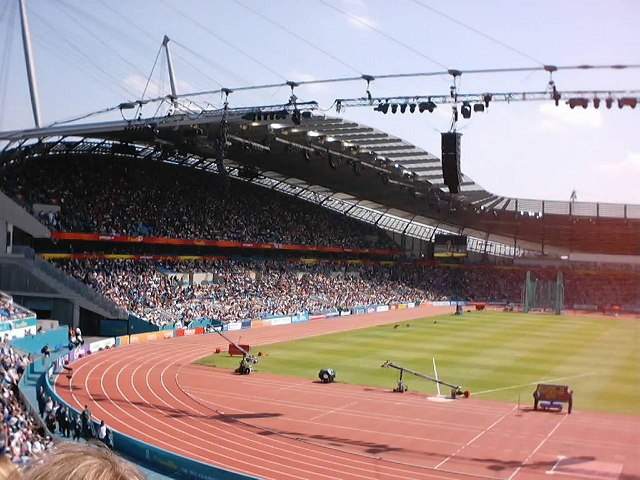
City of Manchester Stadium in 2002

== Medallists ==
Event	Gold	Silver	Bronze
Men's Rugby Sevens	New Zealand; New Zealand; Amasio Valence; Anthony Tuitavake; Brad Fleming; Bruce Reihana; Chris Masoe; Craig de Goldi; Craig Newby; Eric Rush; Karl Te Nana; Mils Muliaina; Rodney So'oialo; Roger Randle	Fiji; Fiji; Epeli Ruivadra; Iosefo Koroiadi; Jope Tuikabe; Josefa Uluivuda; Norman Ligairi; Ratu Saukawa; Rupeni Caucaunibuca; Saiasi Fuli; Seru Rabeni; Viliame Satala; Vilimoni Delasau; Waisale Serevi	South Africa; South Africa; Anton Pitout; Conrad Jantjes; Dale Heidtmann; Egon Seconds; Eugene Francis; Fabian Juries; Gaffie du Toit; Jorrie Muller; Ian Fihlani; Jean de Villiers; Luke Watson; Paul Treu

== Pool stage ==
=== Pool A ===
Team	Pld	W	D	L	PF	PA	PD	Pts
New Zealand	3	3	0	0	120	19	+101	9
Canada	3	2	0	1	45	33	+12	7
Scotland	3	1	0	2	66	38	+28	5
Niue	3	0	0	3	10	151	−141	3

2 August 2002

Canada	7–0	Scotland

City of Manchester Stadium, Manchester

2 August 2002

New Zealand	66–0	Niue

City of Manchester Stadium, Manchester

2 August 2002

Scotland	54–5	Niue

City of Manchester Stadium, Manchester

2 August 2002

New Zealand	28–7	Canada

City of Manchester Stadium, Manchester

3 August 2002

New Zealand	26–12	Scotland

City of Manchester Stadium, Manchester

3 August 2002

Canada	31–5	Niue

City of Manchester Stadium, Manchester

=== Pool B ===
Team	Pld	W	D	L	PF	PA	PD	Pts
South Africa	3	3	0	0	127	24	+103	9
Wales	3	2	0	1	98	36	+62	7
Tonga	3	1	0	2	69	69	0	5
Sri Lanka	3	0	0	3	19	184	−165	3

2 August 2002

Tonga	10–31	Wales

City of Manchester Stadium, Manchester

2 August 2002

South Africa	82–0	Sri Lanka

City of Manchester Stadium, Manchester

2 August 2002

South Africa	19–12	Wales

City of Manchester Stadium, Manchester

2 August 2002

Tonga	47–12	Sri Lanka

City of Manchester Stadium, Manchester

3 August 2002

South Africa	26–12	Tonga

City of Manchester Stadium, Manchester

3 August 2002

Wales	55–7	Sri Lanka

City of Manchester Stadium, Manchester

=== Pool C ===
Team	Pld	W	D	L	PF	PA	PD	Pts
England	3	3	0	0	76	31	+45	9
Samoa	3	1	0	2	70	52	+18	5
Kenya	3	1	0	2	52	67	−15	5
Cook Islands	3	1	0	2	31	79	−48	5

August 2002

England	33–12	Kenya

City of Manchester Stadium, Manchester

August 2002

Samoa	43-5	Cook Islands

City of Manchester Stadium, Manchester

August 2002

Kenya	28-20	Samoa

City of Manchester Stadium, Manchester

August 2002

England	24-12	Cook Islands

City of Manchester Stadium, Manchester

August 2002

Cook Islands	14-12	Kenya

City of Manchester Stadium, Manchester

August 2002

England	19-7	Samoa

City of Manchester Stadium, Manchester

=== Pool D ===
Team	Pld	W	D	L	PF	PA	PD	Pts
Australia	3	3	0	0	133	12	+121	9
Fiji	3	2	0	1	160	19	+141	7
Malaysia	3	1	0	2	45	135	−90	5
Trinidad and Tobago	3	0	0	3	7	179	−172	3

August 2002

Australia	55-0	Malaysia

City of Manchester Stadium, Manchester

August 2002

Fiji	75-0	Trinidad and Tobago

City of Manchester Stadium, Manchester

August 2002

Fiji	73-0	Malaysia

City of Manchester Stadium, Manchester

August 2002

Australia	59-0	Trinidad and Tobago

City of Manchester Stadium, Manchester

August 2002

Malaysia	45-7	Trinidad and Tobago

City of Manchester Stadium, Manchester

August 2002

Australia	19-12	Fiji

City of Manchester Stadium, Manchester

== Knockout stages ==
=== Cup ===
Quarter-finals
03 August – Manchester
New Zealand	24
Wales	0
03 August – Manchester
Samoa	12
Australia	10
03 August – Manchester
Fiji	7
England	5
03 August – Manchester
South Africa	17
Canada	12

Semi-finals
04 August – Manchester
New Zealand	31
Samoa	12
04 August – Manchester
Fiji	17
South Africa	7

Gold-medal match
04 August – Manchester
New Zealand	33
Fiji	15
Bronze-medal match
04 August – Manchester
South Africa	19
Samoa	12

=== Plate ===
For teams knocked out of the Cup quarter finals

Semi-finals
04 August – Manchester
Australia	7
Wales	5
04 August – Manchester
England	29
Canada	0

Final
04 August – Manchester
England	36
Australia	12

=== Bowl ===
Quarter-finals
03 August – Manchester
Scotland	57
Sri Lanka	0
03 August – Manchester
Cook Islands	52
Malaysia	0
03 August – Manchester
Kenya	40
Trinidad and Tobago	0
03 August – Manchester
Tonga	59
Niue	5

Semi-finals
04 August – Manchester
Scotland	26
Cook Islands	7
04 August – Manchester
Tonga	41
Kenya	10

Bowl Final
04 August – Manchester
Scotland	40
Tonga	26
