= Rugby sevens at the 2014 Commonwealth Games =

Rugby Sevens at the 2014 Commonwealth Games
- Venue: Ibrox Stadium
- Location: Glasgow, Scotland
- Dates: 26 to 27 July

Medalists
gold medal	South Africa
silver medal	New Zealand
bronze medal	Australia

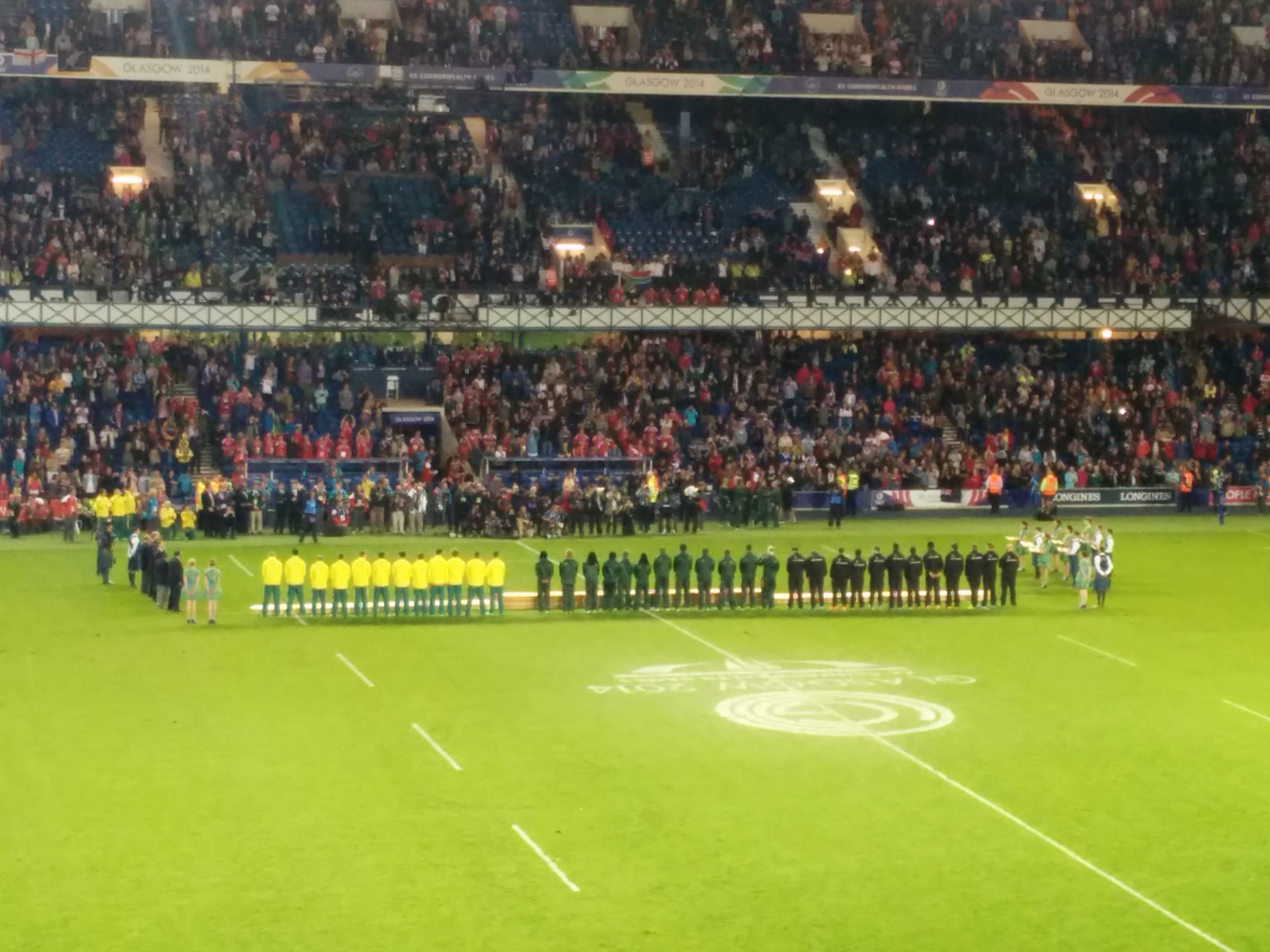
Rugby sevens medal ceremony

Rugby sevens at the 2014 Commonwealth Games was the fifth appearance of Rugby sevens at the Commonwealth Games. Competition was held in Glasgow, Scotland.

The tournament's preliminaries took place on 26 July, with the classification matches, quarterfinals, semifinals and medal matches the following day. The venue for the competition was Ibrox Stadium. South Africa beat the reigning champions New Zealand in the final on 27 July, beating their opponents 17-12. It was the first time that New Zealand had been beaten in any game since the inception of rugby sevens at the 1998 Games, ending their 30 match win streak and marking the first time any other nation had won the competition.

171,000 people attended the two-day competition, a record for the sport.

== Participating nations ==
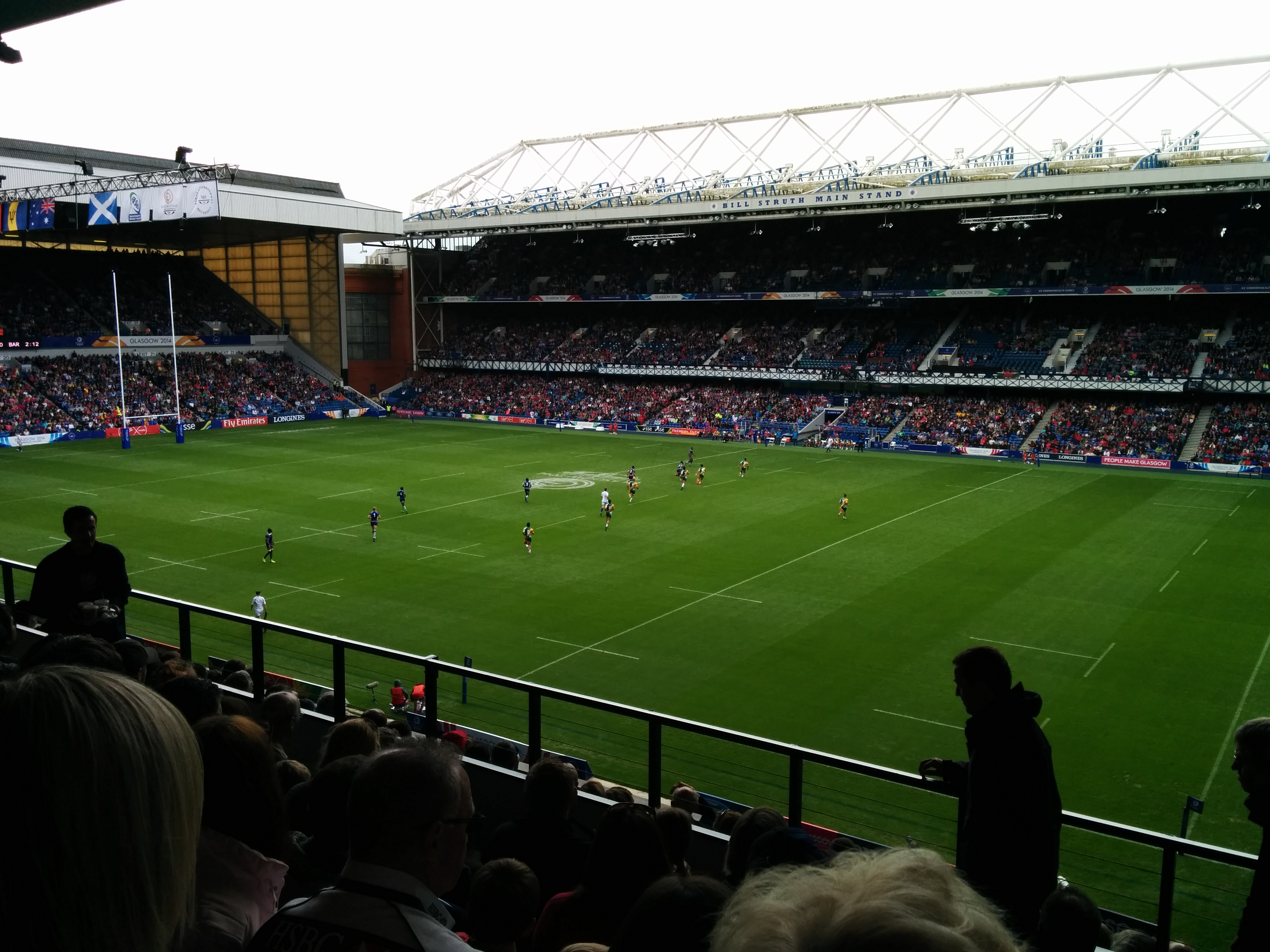
Ibrox hosting the Rugby Sevens tournament of the 2014 Commonwealth Games

The full pools and fixtures for the event were announced on 18 February 2014.

Continent	Teams
Asia	Malaysia; Sri Lanka
Americas	Canada
Caribbean	Trinidad and Tobago; Barbados
Europe	England; Scotland (Hosts); Wales
Africa	Kenya; South Africa; Uganda
Oceania	Australia; Cook Islands; New Zealand; Papua New Guinea; Samoa

Nigeria were originally announced as one of the sixteen teams, but shortly after the team was withdrawn from the rugby competition and replaced by Barbados.

== Pools and format ==
Pool A	Pool B	Pool C	Pool D
New Zealand; Canada; Scotland; Barbados	South Africa; Kenya; Cook Islands; Trinidad and Tobago	Samoa; Wales; Papua New Guinea; Malaysia	Australia; England; Sri Lanka; Uganda

The sixteen teams were divided into four pools of four nations, with each nation playing their other pool opponents once, every nation playing three times during the group stages. Nations were awarded 3 points for a win, 2 for a draw and one point for a loss, the top two nations of every pool advance to the quarterfinals of the medal competition. The winners of each pool then faced the runners up of a different pool in the quarterfinals in a straight single-elimination knockout competition. The winners moved on to the semifinals, with the winners then moving onto the final, and the losers of the semifinals contesting a play off for the bronze medal.

Points System

The points system was the same one used in most sevens competitions, including the IRB Sevens World Series:

- 3 points for a win
- 2 points for a draw
- 1 point for losing

== Pool stage ==
The round robin stage was played on 26 July 2014. All teams played three matches, with the top two in each pool qualifying for the medal competition, and the bottom two qualifying to the bowl competition.

=== Pool A ===
Team	Pld	W	D	L	PF	PA	PD	Pts	Qualification
New Zealand	3	3	0	0	115	14	+101	9	Medal competition
Scotland	3	2	0	1	91	22	+69	7	Medal competition
Canada	3	1	0	2	73	65	+8	5	Bowl competition
Barbados	3	0	0	3	5	183	−178	3	Bowl competition

26 July 2014
10:32

New Zealand	39–0	Canada
	Report

Ibrox Stadium, Glasgow

26 July 2014
12:50

Canada	68–5	Barbados
	Report

Ibrox Stadium, Glasgow

26 July 2014
13:56

New Zealand	17–14	Scotland
	Report

Ibrox Stadium, Glasgow

26 July 2014
18:02

Scotland	56–0	Barbados
	Report

Ibrox Stadium, Glasgow

26 July 2014
20:20

New Zealand	59–0	Barbados
	Report

Ibrox Stadium, Glasgow

26 July 2014
21:04

Canada	5–21	Scotland
	Report

Ibrox Stadium, Glasgow

=== Pool B ===
Team	Pld	W	D	L	PF	PA	PD	Pts	Qualification
South Africa	3	3	0	0	106	0	+106	9	Medal competition
Kenya	3	2	0	1	63	25	+38	7	Medal competition
Cook Islands	3	1	0	2	33	88	−55	5	Bowl competition
Trinidad and Tobago	3	0	0	3	15	104	−89	3	Bowl competition

26 July 2014
11:16

Kenya	28–0	Cook Islands
	Report

Ibrox Stadium, Glasgow

26 July 2014
12:22

South Africa	36–0	Trinidad and Tobago
	Report

Ibrox Stadium, Glasgow

26 July 2014
14:40

Cook Islands	33–10	Trinidad and Tobago
	Report

Ibrox Stadium, Glasgow

26 July 2014
19:30

South Africa	50–0	Cook Islands
	Report

Ibrox Stadium, Glasgow

26 July 2014
19:52

Kenya	35–5	Trinidad and Tobago
	Report

Ibrox Stadium, Glasgow

26 July 2014
22:10

South Africa	20–0	Kenya
	Report

Ibrox Stadium, Glasgow

=== Pool C ===
Team	Pld	W	D	L	PF	PA	PD	Pts	Qualification
Samoa	3	3	0	0	106	26	+80	9	Medal competition
Wales	3	2	0	1	93	26	+67	7	Medal competition
Papua New Guinea	3	1	0	2	57	69	−12	5	Bowl competition
Malaysia	3	0	0	3	7	142	−135	3	Bowl competition

26 July 2014
11:38

Samoa	33–14	Papua New Guinea
	Report

Ibrox Stadium, Glasgow

26 July 2014
12:00

Wales	52–0	Malaysia
	Report

Ibrox Stadium, Glasgow

26 July 2014
14:18

Papua New Guinea	36–7	Malaysia
	Report

Ibrox Stadium, Glasgow

26 July 2014
18:46

Wales	29–7	Papua New Guinea
	Report

Ibrox Stadium, Glasgow

26 July 2014
19:08

Samoa	54–0	Malaysia
	Report

Ibrox Stadium, Glasgow

26 July 2014
21:26

Samoa	19–12	Wales
	Report

Ibrox Stadium, Glasgow

=== Pool D ===
Team	Pld	W	D	L	PF	PA	PD	Pts	Qualification
Australia	3	3	0	0	120	19	+101	9	Medal competition
England	3	2	0	1	104	15	+89	7	Medal competition
Uganda	3	1	0	2	22	97	−75	5	Bowl competition
Sri Lanka	3	0	0	3	21	136	−115	3	Bowl competition

26 July 2014
10:54

Australia	62–7	Sri Lanka
	Report

Ibrox Stadium, Glasgow

26 July 2014
13:12

Australia	43–5	Uganda
	Report

Ibrox Stadium, Glasgow

26 July 2014
13:34

England	57–0	Sri Lanka
	Report

Ibrox Stadium, Glasgow

26 July 2014
18:24

England	40–0	Uganda
	Report

Ibrox Stadium, Glasgow

26 July 2014
20:42

Sri Lanka	14–17	Uganda
	Report

Ibrox Stadium, Glasgow

26 July 2014
21:48

England	7–15	Australia
	Report

Ibrox Stadium, Glasgow

== Knockout stage ==
=== Medal competition ===
Quarter-finals
27 July 2014 — Ibrox Stadium, Glasgow
New Zealand	19
Kenya	7
27 July 2014 — Ibrox Stadium, Glasgow
Australia	21
Wales	19
27 July 2014 — Ibrox Stadium, Glasgow
Samoa	15
England	14
27 July 2014 — Ibrox Stadium, Glasgow
South Africa	35
Scotland	12

Semi-finals
27 July 2014 — Ibrox Stadium, Glasgow
New Zealand	19
Australia	7
27 July 2014 — Ibrox Stadium, Glasgow
Samoa	7
South Africa	35

Final
27 July 2014 — Ibrox Stadium, Glasgow
New Zealand	12
South Africa	17
Third place
27 July 2014 — Ibrox Stadium, Glasgow
Australia	24
Samoa	0

==== Quarter-finals ====
27 July 2014
12:06

New Zealand	19–7	Kenya
	Report

Ibrox Stadium, Glasgow

27 July 2014
12:28

Australia	21–19	Wales
	Report

Ibrox Stadium, Glasgow

27 July 2014
12:50

Samoa	15–14	England
	Report

Ibrox Stadium, Glasgow

27 July 2014
13:12

South Africa	35–12	Scotland
	Report

Ibrox Stadium, Glasgow

==== Semi-finals ====
27 July 2014
18:44

New Zealand	19–7	Australia
	Report

Ibrox Stadium, Glasgow

27 July 2014
19:06

Samoa	7–35	South Africa
	Report

Ibrox Stadium, Glasgow

==== Bronze medal match ====
27 July 2014
21:15

Australia	24–0	Samoa
	Report

Ibrox Stadium, Glasgow

==== Gold medal match ====
27 July 2014
21:37

New Zealand	12–17	South Africa
	Report

Ibrox Stadium, Glasgow, Scotland

=== Plate competition ===
Semi-finals
27 July 2014 — Ibrox Stadium, Glasgow
Kenya	5
Wales	28
27 July 2014 — Ibrox Stadium, Glasgow
England	15
Scotland	12

Final
27 July 2014 — Ibrox Stadium, Glasgow
Wales	15
England	17

==== Semi-finals ====
27 July 2014
18:00

Kenya	5–28	Wales
	Report

Ibrox Stadium, Glasgow

27 July 2014
18:22

England	15–12	Scotland
	Report

Ibrox Stadium, Glasgow

==== Plate final ====
27 July 2014
20:38

Wales	15–17	England
	Report

Ibrox Stadium, Glasgow

=== Bowl competition ===
Quarter-finals
27 July 2014 — Ibrox Stadium, Glasgow
Canada	33
Trinidad and Tobago	0
27 July 2014 — Ibrox Stadium, Glasgow
Uganda	35
Malaysia	0
27 July 2014 — Ibrox Stadium, Glasgow
Papua New Guinea	17
Sri Lanka	12
27 July 2014 — Ibrox Stadium, Glasgow
Cook Islands	31
Barbados	7

Semi-finals
27 July 2014 — Ibrox Stadium, Glasgow
Canada	32
Uganda	0
27 July 2014 — Ibrox Stadium, Glasgow
Papua New Guinea	12
Cook Islands	24

Final
27 July 2014 — Ibrox Stadium, Glasgow
Canada	50
Cook Islands	7

==== Quarter-finals ====
27 July 2014
10:32

Canada	33–0	Trinidad and Tobago
	Report

Ibrox Stadium, Glasgow

27 July 2014
10:54

Uganda	35–0	Malaysia
	Report

Ibrox Stadium, Glasgow

27 July 2014
11:16

Papua New Guinea	17–12	Sri Lanka
	Report

Ibrox Stadium, Glasgow

27 July 2014
11:38

Cook Islands	31–7	Barbados
	Report

Ibrox Stadium, Glasgow

==== Semi-finals ====
27 July 2014
17:16

Canada	32–0	Uganda
	Report

Ibrox Stadium, Glasgow

27 July 2014
17:38

Papua New Guinea	12–24	Cook Islands
	Report

Ibrox Stadium, Glasgow

==== Bowl final ====
27 July 2014
20:10

Canada	50–7	Cook Islands
	Report

Ibrox Stadium, Glasgow

=== Shield competition ===
Semi-finals
27 July 2014 — Ibrox Stadium, Glasgow
Trinidad and Tobago	15
Malaysia	10
27 July 2014 — Ibrox Stadium, Glasgow
Sri Lanka	34
Barbados	0

Final
27 July 2014 — Ibrox Stadium, Glasgow
Trinidad and Tobago	7
Sri Lanka	43

==== Semi-finals ====
27 July 2014
13:34

Trinidad and Tobago	15–10	Malaysia
	Report

Ibrox Stadium, Glasgow

27 July 2014
13:56

Sri Lanka	34–0	Barbados
	Report

Ibrox Stadium, Glasgow

==== Shield final ====
27 July 2014
19:42

Trinidad and Tobago	7–43	Sri Lanka
	Report

Ibrox Stadium, Glasgow

== Medalists ==
Men's	Gold	Silver	Bronze
Men's	South Africa: Cecil Afrika; Kyle Brown; Chris Dry; Branco du Preez; Justin Geduld; Cornal Hendricks; Frankie Horne; Werner Kok; Mark Richards; Seabelo Senatla; Kwagga Smith; Warren Whiteley	New Zealand: Pita Ahki; Scott Curry; Sam Dickson; DJ Forbes; Bryce Heem; Akira Ioane; Gillies Kaka; Ben Lam; Tim Mikkelson; Declan O'Donnell; Sherwin Stowers; Joe Webber	Australia: Cameron Clark; Tom Cusack; Pama Fou; Con Foley; Liam Gill; Greg Jeloudev; Tom Lucas; Sean McMahon; Sam Mayers; James Stannard
