= Craig De Goldi =

NZ international rugby union player

- Born: 7 December 1975 (age 50) Greymouth, New Zealand

Rugby union career
- Position: Loose forward
Senior career
Years	Team	Apps	(Points)
?–2010	Kurita Water RFC		
2006–2008	Penguin International RFC		
2004	Penguin International RFC		
Provincial / State sides
Years	Team	Apps	(Points)
1996-1997	West Coast	19	(15)
1998-2000	Bay of Plenty	34	(20)
2001–2003	Auckland	9	(0)
National sevens team
Years	Team		Comps
1998–2004	New Zealand 7s		
Medal record
Men's rugby sevens
Representing New Zealand
Commonwealth Games
Gold medal – first place	2002 Manchester	Team competition

Craig De Goldi (born 7 December 1975 in Greymouth) is a rugby union footballer from New Zealand. He won a gold medal as part of the New Zealand sevens rugby team at the 2002 Commonwealth Games.

De Goldi captained the All Blacks Sevens team at the 2002 Brisbane Sevens due to veteran captain Eric Rush sustaining a shoulder injury. He spent six years playing in Japan. In 2010 he played for the Manawatu sevens team.
