= Mexico national rugby sevens team =

Mexico
- Union: Mexican Rugby Federation
- Nickname: Serpientes (Snakes)
- Emblem: The Snake
- Coach: Claudio Evensen
Team kit	Change kit

World Cup Sevens
- Appearances: none

The Mexico national rugby sevens team participates in competitions such as the World Sevens Series and Rugby World Cup Sevens. Mexico finished in last place in the 2008 USA Sevens and finished sixth in the 2011 Pan American Games and eighth in the 2015 Pan American Games.

== History ==
Mexico participated in the June 2015 NACRA Sevens, a qualifying tournament for the 2016 Summer Olympics. Mexico went 2–1 in pool play, finishing second in the group and qualifying for the semifinals.

In June 2015, Mexico and Cayman Island qualified to the Hong Kong Sevens 2016 World Series Qualifier at the NACRA Sevens, finishing 3rd and 4th respectively.

In the beginning of 2023, French Olympian Terry Bouhraoua was appointed as the Sporting Director of Mexico Rugby Sevens.

Mexico competed in the first round of the 2024 World Rugby Sevens Challenger Series in Dubai. They finished at the bottom of the table after losing to Papua New Guinea in the eleventh place playoff. Mexico ended the Challenger Series in twelfth place overall.

== Players ==
=== Current squad ===
Squad for the 2024 World Rugby Sevens Challenger Series in Dubai.

No.	Players
1	Ricardo Ancira
2	Alejandro Revilla Beltrán
3	Jose Mauricio Mora
4	Christopher Reyes
5	Andres Rodriguez
6	Franco Guerrero
7	Fharid Samano
8	Luis Angel Galindo
9	Enrique Carmona
10	Rodrigo Ripoll
11	Jose Larraga Martinez
13	Emilio Sanchez

== Tournament History ==
=== Olympic qualifying ===
Final Olympic Qualification Tournament
Year	Round	Position	Pld	W	L	D
(Brazil) 2016	Shield Semi-finals	NA	5	0	5	0
(Japan) 2020	Pool Stage	8th	4	0	4	0
Total	0 Titles	2/2	9	0	9	0

=== World Rugby Sevens Series ===
World Rugby Sevens Series
Tournament	Round	Position	Pld	W	L	D
2008 USA Sevens	Shield Semifinals	NA	5	0	5	0
2009 USA Sevens	Shield Semifinals	NA	5	0	5	0
2011 Hong Kong Sevens	Shield Quarter-finals	NA	4	0	4	0
2013 Hong Kong Sevens	Pool Stage	NA	3	0	3	0
2015 Hong Kong Sevens	Pool Stage	NA	3	0	3	0
2016 Hong Kong Sevens	Pool Stage	NA	3	1	2	0
2021 Canada Sevens (Vancouver)	11th Place Final	12	5	0	5	0
2021 Canada Sevens (Edmonton)	11th Place Final	12	5	0	5	0
Total	0 Titles	6/6	33	1	32	0

=== Pan American Games ===
Pan American Games
Tournament	Round	Position	Pld	W	L	D
(Mexico) 2011	5th-Place Final	6th	6	1	5	0
(Canada) 2015	7th-Place Final	8th	6	0	6	0
(Peru) 2019	Did not qualify					
Total	0 Titles	2/2	12	1	11	0

=== Central American and Caribbean Games ===
Central American & Caribbean Games
Tournament	Round	Position	Pld	W	L	D
(Puerto Rico) 2010	Bronze Medal Finals		6	3	2	1
(Mexico) 2014	Gold Medal Finals	Silver medal	6	5	1	0
(Colombia) 2018	Gold Medal Finals	Silver medal	6	4	2	0
Total	0 Titles	3/3	18	12	5	0

=== RAN Sevens ===
RAN Sevens
Year	Round	Position	P	W	L	D
(Guyana) 2005	3rd-Place Final	4th	NA			
(Guyana) 2010	3rd-Place Final	3rd	NA			
(Barbados) 2011	3rd-Place Final	3rd	NA			
(Canada) 2012	3rd-Place Final	3rd	NA			
(Mexico) 2014	Final	2nd	6	4	2	0
(United States) 2015	3rd-Place Final	3rd	5	3	2	0
(Trinidad and Tobago) 2016	Plate Final	5th	5	3	2	0
(Mexico) 2017	Placement Rounds	3rd	5	4	1	0
(Barbados) 2018	3rd-Place Final	4th	6	4	2	0
(Cayman Islands) 2019	3rd-Place Final	3rd	6	4	2	0
Total	0 Titles	10/10	33	22	11	0

== See also ==
- World Sevens Series
- Rugby World Cup Sevens
- Mexico national rugby union team
