= Barbados national rugby sevens team =

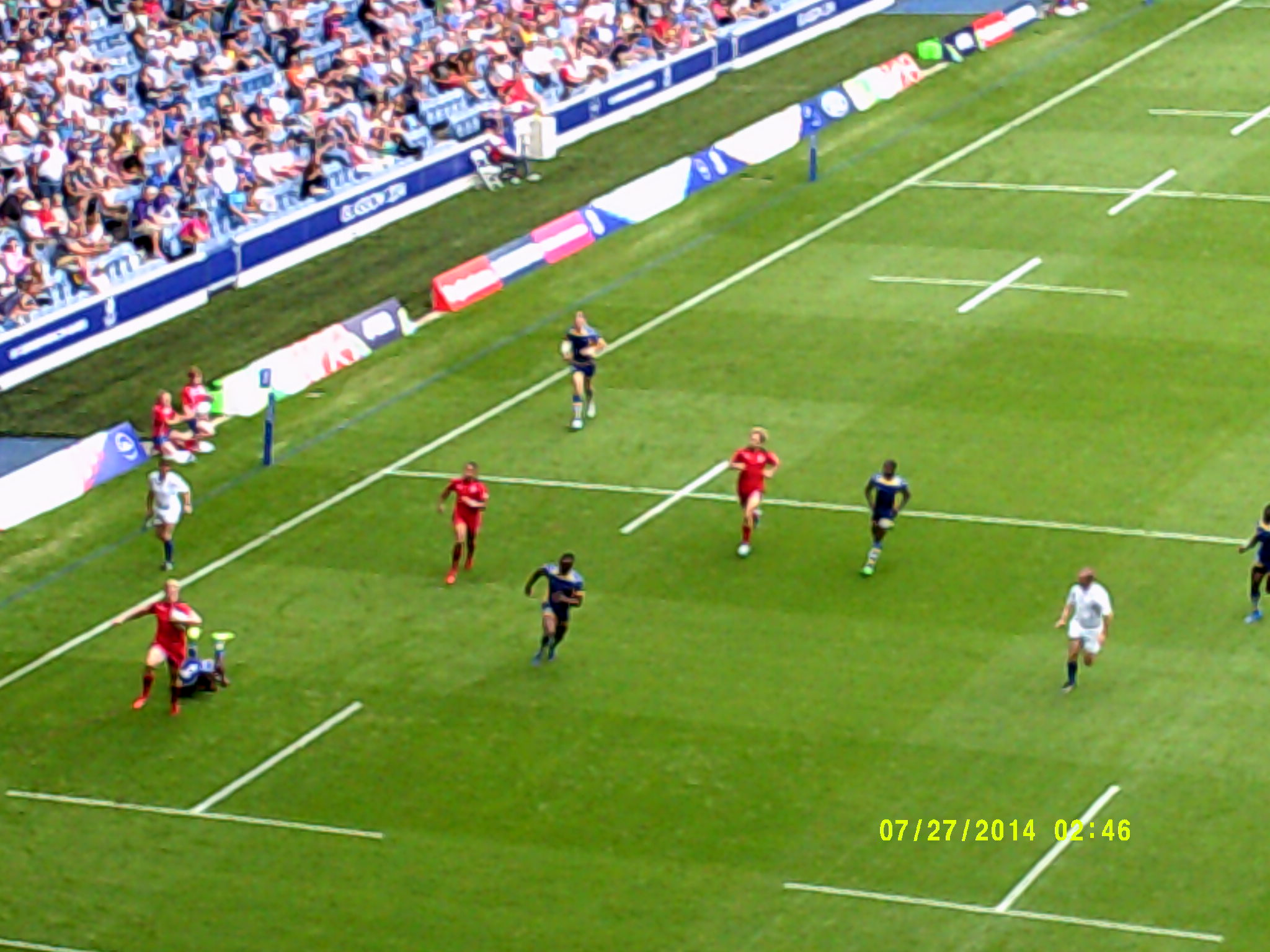
Barbados (blue) playing Canada (red) at the 2014 Commonwealth Games

The Barbados national rugby sevens team is a minor national sevens side. They competed at the Commonwealth Sevens in 2014 replacing Nigeria who withdrew despite qualifying. Barbados also participated in the World Series core team qualifiers at the 2014 Hong Kong Sevens.

The team received some publicity in 2014, when Anthony Bayne-Charles, the son of Billy Ocean, was selected to play for them as a reserve.

== Players ==
- Justin Hart

=== Former squads ===
Squad that participated at the 2014 Hong Kong Sevens World Series Qualifier.

- Shaun English
- Marcus Harewood
- Dominic Peters
- Leo Donnelly
- Adam Mings
- Tom Lucas
- Jae Bowen
- Mike Phillips
- Leon Driscoll
- Sean Ward
- Dwight Forde
- Jamahl Hunte

== See also ==
- Rugby union in Barbados
