= Cayman Islands national rugby sevens team =

The Cayman Islands national rugby sevens team is a minor national rugby sevens side. The Cayman Islands has competed at the Commonwealth Sevens. They made their debut at the Hong Kong Sevens in 2016 making them the 60th team to play at Hong Kong.

== Players ==
=== Previous Squads ===
2016 Hong Kong Sevens Squad
- Alex Harvey
- Paul Westin
- Justin Wight
- Joel Clark
- Robbie Cribb
- Josh Brown
- Cueme Parker
- Jonathan Murphy
- Chris Bunce
- Iain Currie
- Mark Soto
- Shane Westin

== Tournament History ==
=== Olympics ===
The Cayman Islands has not qualified for the Olympics.

=== World Rugby Sevens Series ===
2016 Hong Kong Sevens

Pool E

8 April 2016
14:50

Hong Kong	43–0	Cayman Islands

Hong Kong Stadium, Hong Kong

8 April 2016
16:40

Zimbabwe	35–5	Cayman Islands

Hong Kong Stadium, Hong Kong

9 April 2016
9:44

Germany	48–0	Cayman Islands

Hong Kong Stadium, Hong Kong

== See also ==
- Cayman Islands national rugby union team
- Cayman Islands women's national rugby union team
- Rugby union in the Cayman Islands
