= Bahamas national rugby sevens team =

The Bahamas national rugby sevens team is a minor national sevens side. It has competed at the Commonwealth Sevens. The Bahamas is a small, but emerging rugby sevens nation with four players currently (2009) on the West Indies Sevens squad. Ranked 5th in the Caribbean after the NAWIRA (North America & West Indies Rugby Association) Sevens which were held in Nassau in November 2008. The Bahamas Men & women competed in the Caribbean Championship in Mexico in November 2009.

The Bahamas Rugby Football Union has been a member of World Rugby since 1963.

== See also ==
- Bahamas national rugby union team
- Rugby union in the Bahamas
