= Trinidad and Tobago national rugby sevens team =

Trinidad and Tobago
- Union: Trinidad & Tobago Rugby Football Union
- Nickname: The Calypso Warriors
Team kit

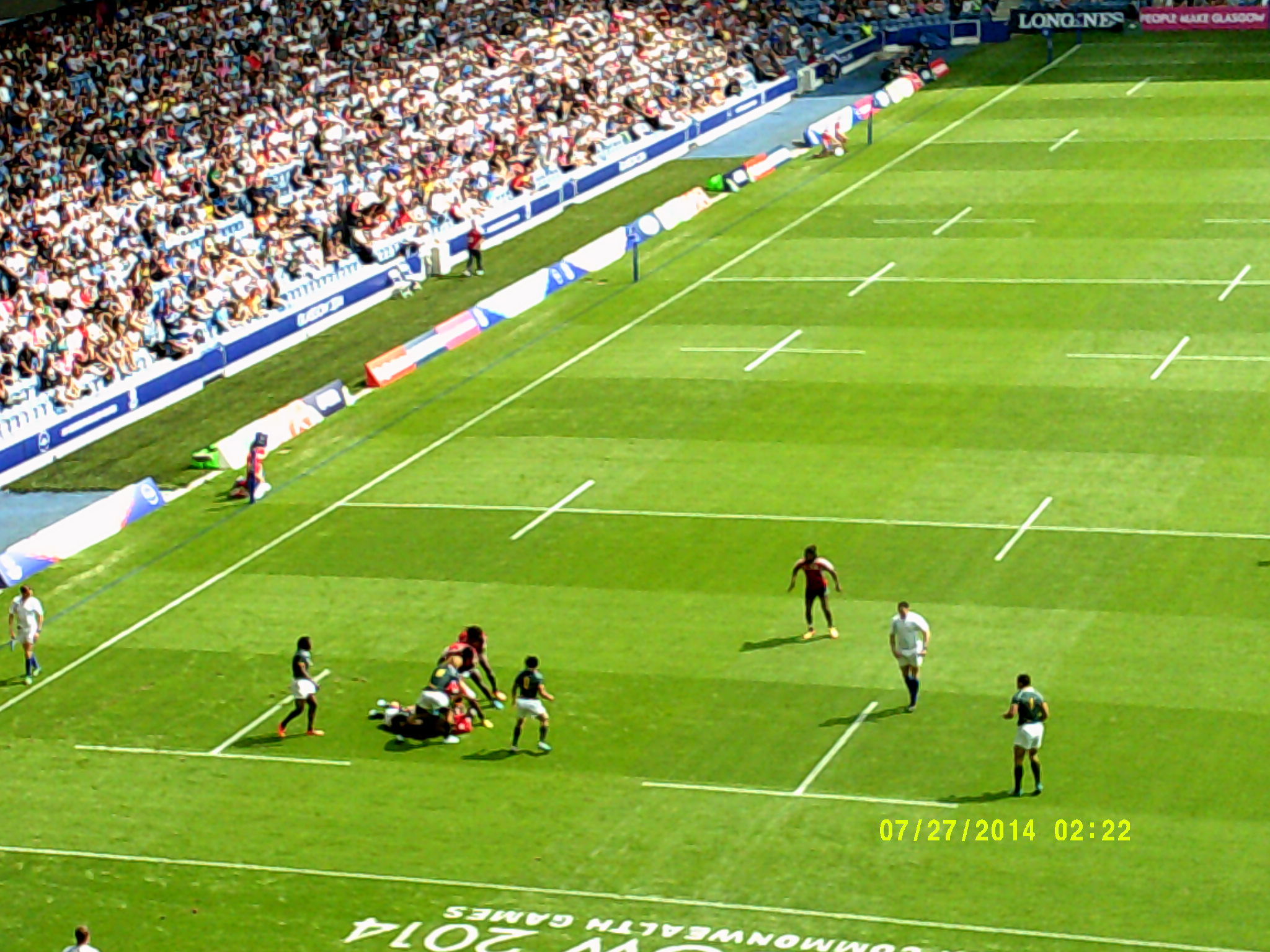
South Africa playing Trinidad and Tobago at the 2014 Commonwealth Games

The Trinidad and Tobago national rugby sevens team is a minor national sevens side. It has competed at the Commonwealth Sevens.

== Current squad ==
Squad to 2014 Hong Kong Sevens.

- Graeme Alkins
- Agboola Silverthorn
- Tony Lopez
- David Gokool
- James Phillip
- Jesse Richards
- Jonathan O'Connor
- Joseph Quashie
- Keishon Walker
- Kelson Figaro
- Wayne Kelly
- Aasan Lewis

== See also ==
- Trinidad and Tobago national rugby union team
- Rugby union in Trinidad and Tobago
- Trinidad and Tobago Rugby Football Union
- Trinidad and Tobago women's national rugby union team
