= Rugby union in Wallis and Futuna =

- Country: Wallis and Futuna
- Governing body: French Rugby Federation; Comité Territorial de Rugby Wallis et Futuna
- National team: Wallis and Futuna
- First played: late 19th century

Rugby union in Wallis and Futuna is a popular sport within the French overseas territory.

== Governing body ==
The Comité Territorial de Rugby Wallis et Futuna is a committee under the umbrella of the French Rugby Federation which is the governing body for rugby union within Wallis and Futuna.

The committee is not affiliated to the IRB in its own right, but it is an associate member of the Federation of Oceania Rugby Unions (FORU), which is the governing body for rugby union in Oceania.

== History ==
Rugby union was first introduced into Wallis and Futuna by the French, and has been played there for over a century. Wallis and Futuna is still a French colony, and this has proven a mixed blessing, as players have the prospect of "promotion" to French professionalism/semi-amateurism, but this also potentially weakens the local system, removing players from local competitions.

Wallis and Futuna also has geographical problems. The two main island groups are 160 km apart, making regular competition difficult. There is also the issue of population, since the islands only have around 13,000 inhabitants. However, the islands have strong ties to Tonga and Samoa, both of which are major rugby nations, despite their small size. The Kailao often thought of as the Tongan haka and used by the Tonga national rugby union team is of Wallisian origin.

=== Pacific Games ===
Wallis and Futuna first played international 15-a-side rugby in 1966 at the South Pacific Games (as it was then called), but has since switched focus onto playing rugby sevens. Rugby Sevens has been a sport in the South Pacific Games since the late 1990s. The Wallis and Futuna team has competed at 7-a-side rugby tournaments in recent Pacific Games.

=== Notable players ===
- Yann David
- Aliki Fakate
- Pierre-Gilles Lakafia
- Raphaël Lakafia
- Dimitri Pelo
- Vincent Pelo
- Laurent Simutoga
- Jocelino Suta
- Willy Taofifénua —from Mata-Utu.
- Christopher Tolofua
- Mikaele Tuugahala
- Sébastien Vahaamahina

== National stadium ==
Stadium	Capacity	City
Stade Laione Rugby	1,000	Mata Utu

== See also ==
- Wallis and Futuna national rugby union team (sevens)
- Wallis and Futuna national rugby union team, currently inactive
- Rugby union in France
