= Rugby sevens at the 2013 Pacific Mini Games =

Men's rugby sevens at the 2013 Pacific Mini Games
- Venue: Kafika Stadium
- Location: Mata Utu, Wallis and Futuna
- Dates: 10–11 September 2013
- Teams: 7

Medalists
gold medal	Samoa
silver medal	Fiji
bronze medal	Tonga

Rugby sevens, for the 2013 Pacific Mini Games, was held at Kafika Stadium in Mata-Utu, Wallis and Futuna. The men's tournament was contested by seven Pacific countries. There was no women's tournament for this sport at these games. The competitions took place on the 10 and 11 September 2013.

== Results ==
=== Round robin ===
Teams	Pld	W	D	L	PF	PA	+/−	Pts
Samoa	6	6	0	0	236	22	+214	18
Fiji	6	5	0	1	189	24	+165	16
Tonga	6	4	0	2	126	68	+58	14
Papua New Guinea	6	3	0	3	137	102	+35	12
New Caledonia	6	2	0	4	81	181	−100	10
Tuvalu	6	1	0	5	33	230	−197	8
Wallis and Futuna	6	0	0	6	24	199	−175	6

10 September 2013
10:25

Samoa	34−0	Tuvalu

Kafika Stadium

10 September 2013
10:50

Fiji	34−0	Wallis and Futuna

Kafika Stadium

10 September 2013
11:15

Tonga	14−7	New Caledonia

Kafika Stadium

10 September 2013
11:40

Samoa	40−0	Papua New Guinea

Kafika Stadium

10 September 2013
12:05

Fiji	55−0	Tuvalu

Kafika Stadium

10 September 2013
12:30

Tonga	21−0	Wallis and Futuna

Kafika Stadium

10 September 2013
12:55

Papua New Guinea	26−14	New Caledonia

Kafika Stadium

10 September 2013
13:20

Fiji	24−0	Tonga

Kafika Stadium

10 September 2013
13:45

Wallis and Futuna	10−12	Tuvalu

Kafika Stadium

10 September 2013
14:10

Samoa	66−0	New Caledonia

Kafika Stadium

10 September 2013
14:35

Tonga	57−0	Tuvalu

Kafika Stadium

10 September 2013
15:00

Papua New Guinea	46−0	Wallis and Futuna

Kafika Stadium

11 September 2013
10:00

New Caledonia	24−21	Tuvalu

Kafika Stadium

11 September 2013
10:25

Samoa	27−10	Tonga

Kafika Stadium

11 September 2013
10:50

Fiji	24−5	Papua New Guinea

Kafika Stadium

11 September 2013
11:15

New Caledonia	36−14	Wallis and Futuna

Kafika Stadium

11 September 2013
11:40

Samoa	19−12	Fiji

Kafika Stadium

11 September 2013
12:05

Papua New Guinea	50−0	Tuvalu

Kafika Stadium

11 September 2013
12:30

Samoa	50−0	Wallis and Futuna

Kafika Stadium

11 September 2013
12:55

Fiji	40−0	New Caledonia

Kafika Stadium

11 September 2013
13:20

Tonga	24−10	Papua New Guinea

Kafika Stadium

=== Knockout stage ===
==== 5th Place ====
Semi-finals
New Caledonia	BYE
11 September 2013 – 13:45 – Kafika Stadium
Tuvalu	14
Wallis and Futuna	17

Final
11 September 2013 – 14:50 – Kafika Stadium
New Caledonia	38
Wallis and Futuna	15

==== Medal Rounds ====
Semi-finals
11 September 2013 – 14:00 – Kafika Stadium
Samoa	49
Papua New Guinea	14
11 September 2013 – 14:25 – Kafika Stadium
Fiji	24
Tonga	5

Gold Medal Match
11 September 2013 – 15:30 – Kafika Stadium
Samoa	31
Fiji	12
Bronze Medal Match
11 September 2013 – 15:55 – Kafika Stadium
Papua New Guinea	12
Tonga	19

==== Final rankings ====
	Team
1st place, gold medalist(s)	Samoa
2nd place, silver medalist(s)	Fiji
3rd place, bronze medalist(s)	Tonga
4	Papua New Guinea
5	New Caledonia
6	Wallis and Futuna
7	Tuvalu
