= Tokelau national rugby sevens team =

Tokelau national rugby sevens team is a minor national side. They competed at the 2011 Pacific Games in New Caledonia where they finished in 8th place.

== Squad ==
Squad to the 2011 Pacific Games

- Lamese Pasene
- Usi Seu
- Lealofi Sasulu
- Etuale Tehoa Ioane
- Simona Puka
- Kosetatino Liufau
- Alosio Isaia
- Elika Teao
- Viliamu Ioapo
- Luaao Luapo
- Falima Tuumuli
- Iona Koloi

== Tournament History ==
=== Pacific Games ===
Pacific Games
Year	Round	Position	Pld	W	D	L
(Guam) 1999	Did Not Compete					
(Fiji) 2003	Did Not Compete					
(Samoa) 2007	Plate Final	5th	6	4	0	2
(New Caledonia) 2011	7th Place Playoff	8th	6	2	0	4
(Papua New Guinea) 2015	Did Not Compete					
(Samoa) 2019	Did Not Compete					
(Solomon Islands) 2023	TBD					
Total	0 Titles	2/6	12	6	0	6

== See also ==
- Tokelau at the 2011 Pacific Games
- Rugby union in Tokelau
