= American Samoa national rugby sevens team =

American Samoa Sevens
- Union: American Samoa Rugby Union
- Nickname: Talavalu
- Coach: Leota Setefano Fata
- Captain: Casey Te Beest
Team kit	Change kit	Change kit

Largest win
- New Caledonia 7–38 American Samoa; 28 October, 2011

Largest defeat
- Fiji 61–0 American Samoa; 28 October 2011

World Cup Sevens
- Appearances: 0

The American Samoa national rugby sevens team represents American Samoa in rugby sevens. They occasionally compete in the Pacific Games and the Oceania Sevens Championship. They have competed in the World Series core team qualifier in 2014.

== Background ==
American Samoa competed in the 2011 Pacific Games and finished in 5th place. In 2013, they finished in fifth place at the Oceania Sevens Championship which gave them the opportunity to compete in the World Series core team qualifier at the 2014 Hong Kong Sevens.

The Talavalu competed at the 2023 Oceania Sevens Championship in Brisbane. They finished in thirteenth place after beating Kiribati in the classification playoff.

== Players ==
Squad to the 2023 Oceania Sevens Championship and Pacific Games.

Players
Ryan Anderson
Joe Koroiadi
Riko Koroiadi
Niles Tuamoheloa
Noah Tuamoheloa
Michael Pa’aga
Casey Te Beest (c)
Lolesio Lolesio
George Ponefasio
Tony Esau
Ta’ai Leota
Joe Tu’ua
James Matavao

== Overall ==
=== Pacific Games ===
Pacific Games
Year	Round	Position	Pld	W	D	L
(New Caledonia) 2011	Fifth Place Playoff	5th	6	3	0	3
(Papua New Guinea) 2015	Did Not Compete					
(Samoa) 2019	Fifth Place Playoff	5th	5	2	0	3
(Solomon Islands) 2023	Fifth Place Playoff	5th	5	3	0	2
Total	0 Titles	3/4	16	8	0	8

=== Oceania Sevens ===
Oceania Sevens
Year	Round	Position	Pld	W	D	L
(Samoa) 2008	Did Not Compete					
(French Polynesia) 2009	Did Not Compete					
(Australia) 2010	Did Not Compete					
(Samoa) 2011	Fifth Place Playoff	6th	7	2	0	5
(Australia) 2012	Fifth Place Playoff	6th	6	3	0	3
(Fiji) 2013	Fifth Place Playoff	5th	6	3	0	3
(Australia) 2014	Seventh Place Playoff	8th	6	1	1	4
(New Zealand) 2015	Seventh Place Playoff	7th	6	1	0	5
(Fiji) 2016	Seventh Place Playoff	7th	7	2	0	5
(Fiji) 2017	Seventh Place Playoff	7th	5	1	1	3
(Fiji) 2018	Did Not Compete					
(Fiji) 2019	Ninth Place Playoff	9th	6	3	0	3
(Australia) 2021	Did Not Compete					
(New Zealand) 2022	Did Not Compete					
(Australia) 2023	13th Place Playoff	13th	5	1	0	4
Total	0 Titles	9/15	54	17	2	35

== See also ==
- Rugby union in American Samoa
- American Samoa national rugby union team
