= Nauru national rugby sevens team =

Nauru Sevens
- Union: Nauru Rugby Union
- Founded: 2012
Team kit	Change kit	Change kit

First international
- Nauru 0–69 Samoa (2015 Pacific Games, 8 July 2015)

Largest win
- Nauru 31-10 Wallis and Futuna (2017 Pacific Mini Games, 9 July 2017)

Largest defeat
- Nauru 0–73 Fiji (2016 Oceania Sevens 11 November 2016)

World Cup Sevens
- Appearances: 0

The Nauru national rugby sevens team made its international debut at the 2015 Pacific Games in Port Moresby, Papua New Guinea.

== History ==
Nauru was introduced to the sport of Rugby sevens in 2012. They became an associate member of the Federation of Oceania Rugby Unions in 2014.

Having made their international debut at the 2015 Pacific Games, they were pooled alongside New Caledonia 7s, Tonga 7s, Vanuatu 7s and 2011 Pacific Games Gold medalists Samoa 7s.

Nauru won their first international game at the 2016 Oceania Sevens Championship, defeating the Solomon Islands 22-19. Competing in the 2017 Pacific Mini Games, Nauru defeated Vanuatu 24-12, and Wallis and Futuna 31-10, their largest win ever. At the 2019 Oceania Sevens in Fiji, Nauru, recorded their first international win when they defeated Vanuatu in the 11th–14th place playoffs.

In 2023, they competed at the Oceania Sevens Championship in Brisbane where they finished in 12th place overall.

== Tournament History ==
=== Oceania Sevens ===
Oceania Sevens
Year	Round	Position	Pld	W	D	L
2008–14	Did Not Compete					
(New Zealand) 2015	7th Place Playoff	8th	6	0	0	6
(Fiji) 2016	9th Place Playoff	9th	5	0	0	5
(Fiji) 2017	Did Not Compete					
(Fiji) 2018	11th Place Playoff	12th	4	0	0	4
(Fiji) 2019	11th Place Playoff	12th	6	1	0	5
(Australia) 2021	Did Not Compete					
(New Zealand) 2022	Did Not Compete					
(Australia) 2023	11th Place Playoff	12th	5	1	0	4
Total	0 Titles	5/15	26	2	0	24

=== Pacific Games ===
Pacific Games
Year	Round	Position	Pld	W	D	L
(Guam) 1999	Did Not Compete					
(Fiji) 2003	Did Not Compete					
(Samoa) 2007	Did Not Compete					
(New Caledonia) 2011	Did Not Compete					
(Papua New Guinea) 2015	9th Place Playoff	10th	5	0	0	5
(Samoa) 2019	5th Place Playoff	6th	5	1	0	4
(Solomon Islands) 2023	11th Place Playoff	11th	4	1	0	3
Total	0 Titles	3/7	14	2	0	12

== Current squad ==
Squad to the 2023 Pacific Games:

Players
Matai Logan Dabwadauw
Elkodawn Dagiaro
Johnny Mullins Dagiaro
Yoshi Harris
Crawford Hedmon
Tama Jeremiah
Jeremiah Kam
Lastman Kamtaura
Geson Koepke
Lockett Mau
Zac Temaki
Lloyd Mark Vunipola
