= Wallis and Futuna national rugby sevens team =

Wallis and Futuna
- Union: Wallis and Futuna Rugby Committee
- Coach: Sailosi Nawavu

The Wallis and Futuna national rugby sevens team is a minor national team that competes in the Pacific Games and in regional tournaments.

== Background ==
Wallis and Futuna hosted the 2013 Pacific Mini Games Sevens competition. They participated in the 2019 Pacific Games in Apia, Samoa.

They competed in the Nawaka Sevens tournament in Fiji in preparation for the 2023 Pacific Games. They competed at the Pacific Games in Honiara and were placed in Pool D with Tahiti, Papua New Guinea, and the Solomon Islands.

== Squad ==
Squad to 2023 Pacific Games:

Players
Asokalaga Heafala
Palasito Hiva
Gregory Holokaukau
Yoktan Kaikilekofe
Wenelik Maituku
Alex Mulikiha'amea
Kamaliele Mulikiha'amea
Lafaele Musulamu
Patrick Rabuka
Cedric Soule
Soane Ulikefoa
Suliasi Vitau

== Tournament History ==
=== Pacific Games ===
Pacific Games
| Year | Round | Position | Pld | W | D | L |
|---|---|---|---|---|---|---|
| (Guam) 1999 | Plate Semifinal | N/A | 5 | 1 | 0 | 4 |
| (Fiji) 2003 | 9th–11th Place Playoff | 11th | 5 | 0 | 0 | 5 |
| (Samoa) 2007 | Did Not Compete | | | | | |
| (New Caledonia) 2011 | 11th Place Playoff | 11th | 5 | 1 | 0 | 4 |
| (Papua New Guinea) 2015 | Did Not Compete | | | | | |
| (Samoa) 2019 | 9th Place Playoff | 9th | 5 | 1 | 0 | 4 |
| (Solomon Islands) 2023 | Pool Stage | 13th | 3 | 0 | 0 | 3 |
| Total | 0 Titles | 5/7 | 23 | 3 | 0 | 20 |

== See also ==
- Wallis and Futuna Rugby Committee
- Rugby union in Wallis and Futuna
- Rugby union in France
