= Rebecca Kulimoetoke =

Wallisian artist and teacher

- Known for: Stamp design

Rebecca Kulimoetoke is an artist and teacher from Wallis, in the French overseas territory of Wallis and Futuna. An expert in tapa cloth, she is also a visual artist, with her painting featured in exhibitions and on stamps. She donated several of her works to the Musée du Vivant-AgroParisTech, where they are displayed with objects loaned by Uvea Museum Association. In 2015 her work was displayed as part of Dordogne's Histoire de passages festival. She studied at Jean Monnet University before returning to Wallis.

== Philately ==
Kulimoetoke's paintings have been used on several stamps issued by Wallis and Futuna, including: 'Seaside' (200 Fr - 2006), commemorating World Youth Day (350 Fr - 2018), to mark the centenary of the birth of Lavelua Tomasi Kulimoetoke (600 Fr - 2018), for Bastille Day (500 Fr - 2018).
