= Esitele Fuluhea Lakalaka =

Women's rights activist from Wallis and Futuna

Esitele Fuluhea Lakalaka, also known as Estelle Lakalaka, is a women’s rights activist from Wallis and Futuna.

During the 1960s Lakalaka began working in the territory’s health sector. She began as a secretary and interpreter, before becoming a midwife at Sia Hospital in Matā'utu. She then became a management executive of the hospital.

Alongside her work in the heath sector, Lakalaka developed an interest in politics and public affairs. In 1977 she was the first woman in Wallis and Futuna to be registered on an electoral list. In 1982 she became the first woman on the Government Council, which she served on for ten years.

She was a member of the RPR (Rassemblement pour la Republique) party and president of the association of RPR women of Wallis and Futuna. From 1996 to 2001 she was President of the Territorial Council of Women and from 2005 to 2010 a delegate of Women’s Rights for the territory. She was instrumental in setting up the Commission on the Status of Women in the Territorial Assembly in 2007. She has remained an active advocate for women's rights, including working with fellow francophone campaigners from French Polynesia and New Caledonia for the promotion of the Convention on the Elimination of All Forms of Discrimination against Women.
