= 2019 Oceania Sevens Championship =

- Host nation: Fiji
- Date: 7–9 November 2019

Cup
- Champion: Australia (4th title)
- Runner-up: Fiji
- Third: Japan

Tournament details
- Matches played: 43

The 2019 Oceania Sevens Championship was the twelfth Oceania Sevens tournament in men's rugby sevens. It served as the regional qualifier for the 2020 Tokyo Olympic Sevens and was held at ANZ Stadium in Suva, Fiji on 7–9 November. A competition for deaf teams was also included as part of the 2019 Oceania Sevens.

Australia won the main men's tournament to claim their fourth Oceania Championship, defeating Fiji by 22–7 in the final. As the highest-placed side not already qualified, Australia also won the Oceania berth at the 2020 Olympic Sevens in Tokyo.

Samoa and Tonga finished fourth and fifth respectively and, as the second and third highest-placed sides not already qualified, won entry to the 2020 Final Olympic Qualifier.

Tonga and Papua New Guinea, as the two highest-placed sides without core status on the World Rugby Sevens Series, won entry to the 2020 Challenger Series for a chance to qualify for the 2020–21 World Sevens Series.

== Teams ==
Fifteen national teams competed at the 2019 tournament, including an invited sevens development side from Japan:

- American Samoa
- Australia
- Cook Islands
- Fiji
- Japan (Note: Japan sent a national sevens development squad to the tournament and thus did not compete as the national team.)
- Nauru
- New Caledonia
- Niue
- New Zealand
- Papua New Guinea
- Samoa
- Solomon Islands
- Tonga
- Tuvalu
- Vanuatu

== Format ==
Teams were seeded into three pools of five.

To allow a clear run for countries competing for qualification to the 2020 Olympic Sevens, the two Oceania nations already qualified, Fiji and New Zealand, were placed in Pool A together with the invited development side from Japan, New Caledonia (not Olympic eligible) and Niue. The remaining teams were seeded into Pool B and Pool C.

A playoff between the winners of Pool B and Pool C decided the Olympic qualifying berth.

== Pool stage ==
=== Pool A (International) ===
Pos	Team	P	W	D	L	PF	PA	PD	Pts	Qualification
1	Fiji	4	4	0	0	175	15	+160	12	Advance to title playoffs
2	Japan	4	3	0	1	98	45	+53	10	Advance to title playoffs
3	New Zealand	4	2	0	2	124	38	+86	8	Middle classification
4	New Caledonia	4	1	0	3	17	180	–163	6	Lower classification
5	Niue	4	0	0	4	7	143	–136	4	Fifteenth place

7 November
13:12

New Zealand	57–0	New Caledonia

ANZ Stadium, Suva

7 November
13:34

Fiji	57–0	Niue

ANZ Stadium, Suva

7 November
16:08

New Zealand	38–0	Niue

ANZ Stadium, Suva

7 November
16:30

Japan	50–0	New Caledonia

ANZ Stadium, Suva

7 November
19:04

New Caledonia	17–7	Niue

ANZ Stadium, Suva

7 November
19:26

Fiji	31–0	Japan

ANZ Stadium, Suva

8 November
14:40

New Zealand	14–17	Japan

ANZ Stadium, Suva

8 November
15:02

Fiji	66–0	New Caledonia

ANZ Stadium, Suva

8 November
19:04

Japan	31–0	Niue

ANZ Stadium, Suva

8 November
19:26

Fiji	21–15	New Zealand

ANZ Stadium, Suva

=== Pool B (Olympic) ===
Pos	Team	P	W	D	L	PF	PA	PD	Pts	Qualification
1	Samoa	4	4	0	0	156	7	+149	12	Advance to title playoffs
2	Papua New Guinea	4	3	0	1	77	50	+27	10	Fifth place match
3	Solomon Islands	4	2	0	2	45	88	–43	8	Middle classification
4	Cook Islands	4	1	0	3	50	88	–38	6	Middle classification
5	Tuvalu	4	0	0	4	24	119	–95	4	Lower classification

7 November
12:28

Cook Islands	31–19	Tuvalu

ANZ Stadium, Suva

7 November
12:50

Samoa	33–7	Papua New Guinea

ANZ Stadium, Suva

7 November
15:24

Cook Islands	5–17	Papua New Guinea

ANZ Stadium, Suva

7 November
15:46

Solomon Islands	12–5	Tuvalu

ANZ Stadium, Suva

7 November
18:20

Tuvalu	0–29	Papua New Guinea

ANZ Stadium, Suva

7 November
18:42

Samoa	45–0	Solomon Islands

ANZ Stadium, Suva

8 November
13:56

Cook Islands	14–21	Solomon Islands

ANZ Stadium, Suva

8 November
14:18

Samoa	47–0	Tuvalu

ANZ Stadium, Suva

8 November
18:20

Solomon Islands	12–24	Papua New Guinea

ANZ Stadium, Suva

8 November
18:42

Samoa	41–0	Cook Islands

ANZ Stadium, Suva

=== Pool C (Olympic) ===
Pos	Team	P	W	D	L	PF	PA	PD	Pts	Qualification
1	Australia	4	4	0	0	201	7	+194	12	Advance to title playoffs
2	Tonga	4	3	0	1	97	44	+53	10	Fifth place match
3	American Samoa	4	2	0	2	41	116	–75	8	Middle classification
4	Vanuatu	4	1	0	3	43	119	–76	6	Lower classification
5	Nauru	4	0	0	4	33	129	–96	4	Lower classification

7 November
11:44

Tonga	29–5	American Samoa

ANZ Stadium, Suva

7 November
12:06

Australia	52–7	Vanuatu

ANZ Stadium, Suva

7 November
14:40

Tonga	34–10	Vanuatu

ANZ Stadium, Suva

7 November
15:02

Nauru	14–17	American Samoa

ANZ Stadium, Suva

7 November
17:36

American Samoa	19–7	Vanuatu

ANZ Stadium, Suva

7 November
17:58

Australia	59–0	Nauru

ANZ Stadium, Suva

8 November
13:12

Tonga	34–5	Nauru

ANZ Stadium, Suva

8 November
13:34

Australia	66–0	American Samoa

ANZ Stadium, Suva

8 November
17:36

Nauru	14–19	Vanuatu

ANZ Stadium, Suva

8 November
17:58

Australia	24–0	Tonga

ANZ Stadium, Suva

== Knockout stage ==
=== Lower classification ===
11th–14th playoffs
9 November 2019 – 10.44 – ANZ Stadium
New Caledonia	7
Tuvalu	12
9 November 2019 – 11.06 – ANZ Stadium
Vanuatu	14
Nauru	22

Eleventh place
9 November 2019 – 13.18 – ANZ Stadium
Tuvalu	17
Nauru	12
Thirteenth place
9 November 2019 – 13.40 – ANZ Stadium
New Caledonia	7
Vanuatu	24

=== Middle classification ===
7th–10th playoffs
9 November 2019 – 11.50 – ANZ Stadium
Solomon Islands	35
American Samoa	5
9 November 2019 – 11.28 – ANZ Stadium
New Zealand	64
Cook Islands	0

Seventh place
9 November 2019 – 14.24 – ANZ Stadium
Solomon Islands	7
New Zealand	39
Ninth place
9 November 2019 – 14.02 – ANZ Stadium
American Samoa	34
Cook Islands	0

=== Fifth place match ===
9 November 2019 – 17.20 – ANZ Stadium
Papua New Guinea	0
Tonga	31

=== Title playoffs ===
International playoff

Oceania final

9 November 2019 – 16.14 – ANZ Stadium

A1
Fiji
33

9 November 2019 – 19.50 – ANZ Stadium
Fiji	7
Australia	22

A2
Japan
0

9 November 2019 – 16.36 – ANZ Stadium

B1
Samoa
12

Third place

C1
Australia
19

9 November 2019 – 18.57 – ANZ Stadium

Japan
26

Samoa
21

== Placings ==
Place	Team	Qualification
1st place, gold medalist(s)	Australia	Direct qualification to the Olympic Sevens for 2020
2nd place, silver medalist(s)	Fiji	
3rd place, bronze medalist(s)	Japan	
4	Samoa	Entry to Olympic qualifier for 2020
5	Tonga	Entry to Olympic qualifier and World Challenger Series for 2020
6	Papua New Guinea	Entry to World Challenger Series for 2020
7	New Zealand	
8	Solomon Islands	
9	American Samoa	
10	Cook Islands	
11	Tuvalu	
12	Nauru	
13	Vanuatu	
14	New Caledonia	
15	Niue	

Legend
Light bar	Already a core team in World Series and previously qualified to the Olympic Sevens for 2020
Dark bar	Already a core team in World Series for 2020
Dotted bar	Invited team not eligible for qualification from Oceania

== See also ==
- 2019 Oceania Women's Sevens Championship
