= Tuvalu national rugby sevens team =

Tuvalu
- Union: Tuvalu Rugby Union

World Cup Sevens
- Appearances: 0

The Tuvalu national rugby sevens team (Tuvalu 7s) participates in the Rugby Sevens competitions at the Pacific Games and the Oceania Sevens Championship.

== History ==
The Tuvalu Rugby Union (TRU) was established in 2007 as the organising body for Rugby Union in Tuvalu. The TRU selects the members of the Tuvalu 7s.

Tuvalu is a lower ranking rugby nation, with the Tuvalu 7s focusing on skills development. The Tuvalu 7s lost all their matches at the 2011 Pacific Games, and at the 2017 Oceania Sevens Championships.

Elenoa Kunatuba was the Tuvalu men’s 7s coach, at the 2019 Pacific Games; she selected seven new players for the games squad.

In 2023, Tuvalu competed at the 2023 Oceania Sevens Championship where they finished eleventh overall.

== Players ==
=== Current squad ===
Tuvalu's squad to the 2023 Pacific Games in Honiara, Solomon Islands:

Players
Timoci Vidi
Mataese Dumaru
Asuelu Teniukita Falaimo
Tiliga Lomiata
Taitai Mika
Vaisameni Nafatali
Leiatu Fatiga Papa
Lofeagai Sanaila
Romeo Sovatabu
Simeon Taasi
John Jazzy Talava
Iliala Tolauapi
Jotame Levaci Sokobalavu Tupoulewa
Sileti Viliamu

== Tournament History ==
=== Pacific Games ===
Pacific Games
Year	Round	Position	Pld	W	D	L
(Guam) 1999	Did Not Compete					
(Fiji) 2003	Did Not Compete					
(Samoa) 2007	9th Place Playoff	10th	5	0	0	5
(New Caledonia) 2011	11th Place Playoff	12th	5	0	0	5
(Papua New Guinea) 2015	Did Not Compete					
(Samoa) 2019	9th Place Playoff	10th	5	0	0	5
(Solomon Islands) 2023	9th Place Playoff	9th	4	2	0	2
Total	0 Titles	4/7	19	2	0	17

=== Oceania Sevens ===
Oceania Sevens
Year	Round	Position	Pld	W	D	L
2008–12	Did Not Compete					
(Fiji) 2013	7th Place Playoff	8th	6	0	0	6
2014–16	Did Not Compete					
(Fiji) 2017	Pool Stage	13th	3	0	0	3
(Fiji) 2018	11th Place Playoff	11th	5	2	0	3
(Fiji) 2019	11th Place Playoff	11th	6	2	0	4
(Australia) 2021	Did Not Compete					
(New Zealand) 2022	Did Not Compete					
(Australia) 2023	11th Place Playoff	11th	5	2	0	3
Total	0 Titles	5/15	25	6	0	19

== See also ==
- Rugby union in Tuvalu
- Sport in Tuvalu
