= 2014 Hong Kong Sevens =

Rugby union sevens tournament

- IRB Sevens XV
- Host nation: Hong Kong
- Date: 28–30 March 2014

Cup
- Champion: New Zealand
- Runner-up: England
- Third: Fiji

Plate
- Winner: South Africa
- Runner-up: Wales

Bowl
- Winner: Scotland
- Runner-up: France

Shield
- Winner: Kenya
- Runner-up: Portugal

Tournament details
- Matches played: 29
- Tries scored: 242 (average 8.34 per match)

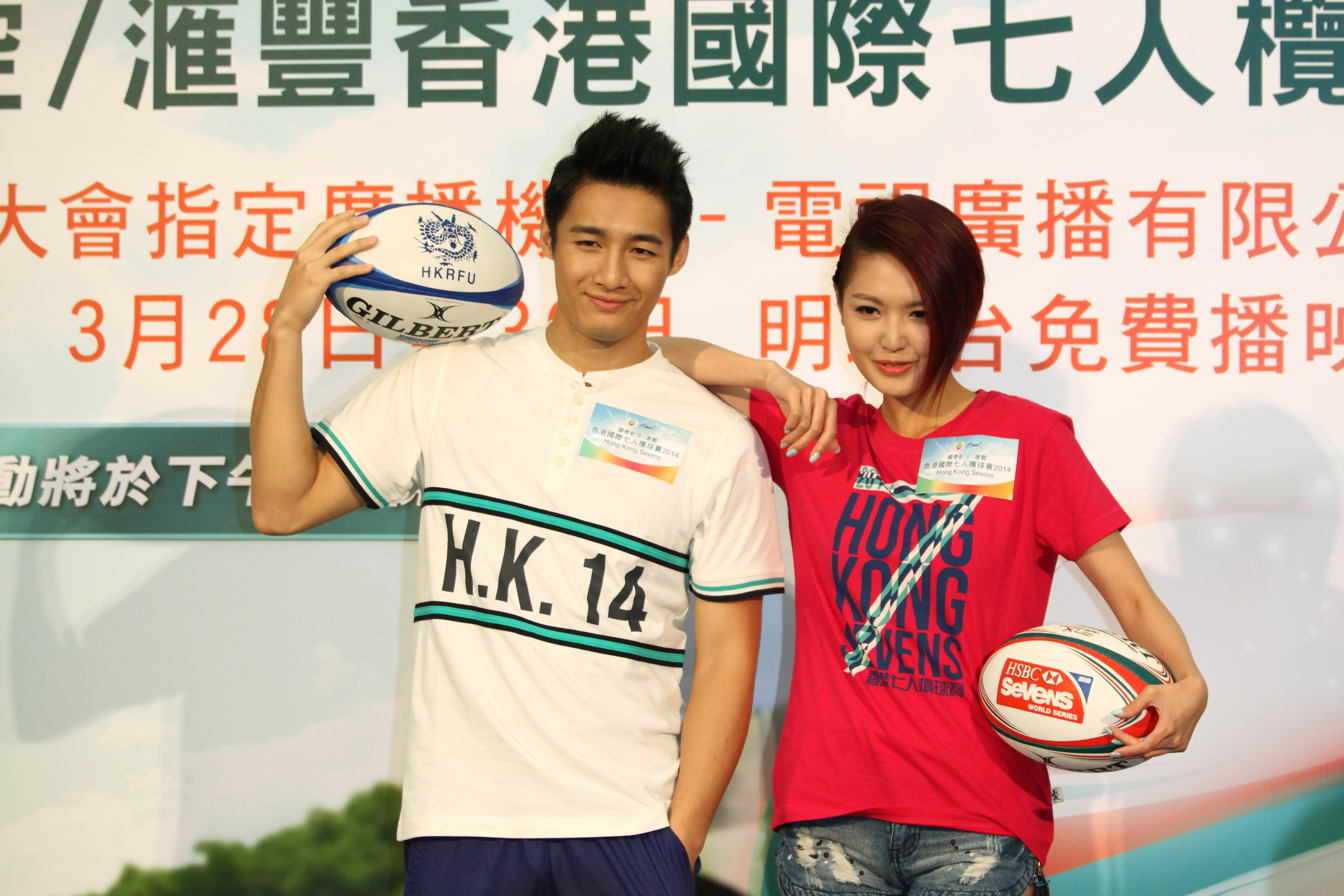
William Chak and Toby Chan promoting the Hong Kong Sevens Rugby.

The 2014 Hong Kong Sevens was the 39th edition of the Hong Kong Sevens and the seventh tournament of the 2013–2014 Sevens World Series. It took place at its long-time home, Hong Kong Stadium.

The Cup title was claimed by New Zealand, with South Africa, Scotland and Kenya respectively claiming the lower-level Plate, Bowl and Shield. Japan won the World Series Core Team Qualifier to earn promotion to "core" status for the 2014–15 series.

== Format ==
The teams were drawn into four pools of four teams each. Each team played all others in their pool once. The top two teams from each pool advanced to the Cup/Plate brackets. The bottom two teams from each group entered the Bowl/Shield brackets.

== Teams ==
28 teams were scheduled to participate—16 in the main draw, and 12 in the Core Team Qualifier.

=== Main draw ===
- Argentina
- Australia
- Canada
- England
- Fiji
- France
- Kenya
- New Zealand
- Portugal
- Western Samoa
- Scotland
- South Africa
- Spain
- Sri Lanka
- United States
- Wales

=== World Series core team qualifier ===
- Russia
- Italy
- Japan
- Hong Kong
- Cook Islands
- American Samoa
- Trinidad and Tobago
- Barbados
- Zimbabwe
- Tunisia
- Chile
- Uruguay

== Main draw ==
The draw was made on 23 March.

Key to colours in group tables
| Teams that advanced to the Cup quarterfinal |

=== Pool stage ===
==== Pool A ====
| Pos | Team | Pld | W | D | L | PF | PA | PD | Pts |
|---|---|---|---|---|---|---|---|---|---|
| 1 | Fiji | 3 | 3 | 0 | 0 | 141 | 12 | +129 | 9 |
| 2 | Wales | 3 | 2 | 0 | 1 | 64 | 61 | +3 | 7 |
| 3 | Kenya | 3 | 1 | 0 | 2 | 53 | 53 | 0 | 5 |
| 4 | Sri Lanka | 3 | 0 | 0 | 3 | 12 | 144 | −132 | 3 |

28 March 2014
19:30

| Kenya | 41–0 | Sri Lanka |
| | Report |

Hong Kong Stadium, Hong Kong

28 March 2014
21:26

| Fiji | 42–7 | Wales |
| | Report |

Hong Kong Stadium, Hong Kong

29 March 2014
13:24

| Fiji | 56–0 | Sri Lanka |
| | Report |

Hong Kong Stadium, Hong Kong

29 March 2014
13:46

| Kenya | 7–10 | Wales |
| | Report |

Hong Kong Stadium, Hong Kong

29 March 2014
16:20

| Wales | 47–12 | Sri Lanka |
| | Report |

Hong Kong Stadium, Hong Kong

29 March 2014
19:16

| Fiji | 43–5 | Kenya |
| | Report |

Hong Kong Stadium, Hong Kong

==== Pool B ====
| Pos | Team | Pld | W | D | L | PF | PA | PD | Pts |
|---|---|---|---|---|---|---|---|---|---|
| 1 | Australia | 3 | 3 | 0 | 0 | 64 | 21 | +43 | 9 |
| 2 | South Africa | 3 | 2 | 0 | 1 | 60 | 31 | +29 | 7 |
| 3 | France | 3 | 1 | 0 | 2 | 21 | 67 | −46 | 5 |
| 4 | Spain | 3 | 0 | 0 | 3 | 38 | 64 | −26 | 3 |

28 March 2014
19:08

| Australia | 28–14 | Spain |
| | Report |

Hong Kong Stadium, Hong Kong

28 March 2014
21:04

| South Africa | 31–7 | France |
| | Report |

Hong Kong Stadium, Hong Kong

29 March 2014
12:40

| South Africa | 22–14 | Spain |
| | Report |

Hong Kong Stadium, Hong Kong

29 March 2014
13:02

| Australia | 26–0 | France |
| | Report |

Hong Kong Stadium, Hong Kong

29 March 2014
15:58

| France | 14–10 | Spain |
| | Report |

Hong Kong Stadium, Hong Kong

29 March 2014
18:54

| South Africa | 7–10 | Australia |
| | Report |

Hong Kong Stadium, Hong Kong

==== Pool C ====
| Pos | Team | Pld | W | D | L | PF | PA | PD | Pts |
|---|---|---|---|---|---|---|---|---|---|
| 1 | England | 3 | 3 | 0 | 0 | 54 | 31 | +23 | 9 |
| 2 | Canada | 3 | 2 | 0 | 1 | 61 | 28 | +33 | 7 |
| 3 | Argentina | 3 | 1 | 0 | 2 | 38 | 40 | −2 | 5 |
| 4 | Portugal | 3 | 0 | 0 | 3 | 21 | 75 | −54 | 3 |

28 March 2014
18:46

| Canada | 35–7 | Portugal |
| | Report |

Hong Kong Stadium, Hong Kong

28 March 2014
20:42

| England | 19–12 | Argentina |
| | Report |

Hong Kong Stadium, Hong Kong

29 March 2014
11:56

| England | 21–7 | Portugal |
| | Report |

Hong Kong Stadium, Hong Kong

29 March 2014
12:18

| Canada | 14–7 | Argentina |
| | Report |

Hong Kong Stadium, Hong Kong

29 March 2014
15:36

| Argentina | 19–7 | Portugal |
| | Report |

Hong Kong Stadium, Hong Kong

29 March 2014
18:32

| England | 14–12 | Canada |
| | Report |

Hong Kong Stadium, Hong Kong

==== Pool D ====
| Pos | Team | Pld | W | D | L | PF | PA | PD | Pts |
|---|---|---|---|---|---|---|---|---|---|
| 1 | New Zealand | 3 | 3 | 0 | 0 | 76 | 14 | +62 | 9 |
| 2 | United States | 3 | 1 | 0 | 2 | 43 | 44 | −1 | 5 |
| 3 | Samoa | 3 | 1 | 0 | 2 | 38 | 66 | −28 | 5 |
| 4 | Scotland | 3 | 1 | 0 | 2 | 29 | 62 | −33 | 5 |

28 March 2014
18:24

| United States | 26–12 | Samoa |
| | Report |

Hong Kong Stadium, Hong Kong

28 March 2014
20:20

| New Zealand | 33–0 | Scotland |
| | Report |

Hong Kong Stadium, Hong Kong

29 March 2014
11:12

| New Zealand | 26–7 | Samoa |
| | Report |

Hong Kong Stadium, Hong Kong

29 March 2014
11:34

| United States | 10–15 | Scotland |
| | Report |

Hong Kong Stadium, Hong Kong

29 March 2014
15:14

| Scotland | 14–19 | Samoa |
| | Report |

Hong Kong Stadium, Hong Kong

29 March 2014
18:10

| New Zealand | 17–7 | United States |
| | Report |

Hong Kong Stadium, Hong Kong

=== Knockout stage ===
==== Shield ====
Quarter-finals
30 March 2014 – 10:00 – Hong Kong Stadium
Kenya | 12
Scotland | 26
30 March 2014 – 10:22 – Hong Kong Stadium
Argentina | 7
Spain | 5
30 March 2014 – 10:44 – Hong Kong Stadium
Samoa | 33
Sri Lanka | 14
30 March 2014 – 11:06 – Hong Kong Stadium
France | 19
Portugal | 14

Semi-finals
30 March 2014 – 13:40 – Hong Kong Stadium
Kenya | 12
Spain | 7
30 March 2014 – 14:02 – Hong Kong Stadium
Sri Lanka | 19
Portugal | 24

Final
30 March 2014 – 17:05 – Hong Kong Stadium
Kenya | 17
Portugal | 10

==== Bowl ====
Quarter-finals
30 March 2014 – 10:00 – Hong Kong Stadium
Kenya | 12
Scotland | 26
30 March 2014 – 10:22 – Hong Kong Stadium
Argentina | 7
Spain | 5
30 March 2014 – 10:44 – Hong Kong Stadium
Samoa | 33
Sri Lanka | 14
30 March 2014 – 11:06 – Hong Kong Stadium
France | 19
Portugal | 14

Semi-finals
30 March 2014 – 14:24 – Hong Kong Stadium
Scotland | 24
Argentina | 12
30 March 2014 – 14:46 – Hong Kong Stadium
Samoa | 5
France | 38

Final
30 March 2014 – 17:30 – Hong Kong Stadium
Scotland | 31
France | 5

==== Plate ====
Quarter-finals
30 March 2014 – 11:28 – Hong Kong Stadium
Fiji | 17
United States | 5
30 March 2014 – 11:50 – Hong Kong Stadium
England | 14
South Africa | 7
30 March 2014 – 12:12 – Hong Kong Stadium
New Zealand | 28
Wales | 5
30 March 2014 – 12:34 – Hong Kong Stadium
Australia | 14
Canada | 12

Semi-finals
30 March 2014 – 15:08 – Hong Kong Stadium
United States | 19
South Africa | 24
30 March 2014 – 15:30 – Hong Kong Stadium
Wales | 31
Canada | 14

Final
30 March 2014 – 17:55 – Hong Kong Stadium
South Africa | 19
Wales | 14

==== Cup ====
Quarter-finals
30 March 2014 – 11:28 – Hong Kong Stadium
Fiji | 17
United States | 5
30 March 2014 – 11:50 – Hong Kong Stadium
England | 14
South Africa | 7
30 March 2014 – 12:12 – Hong Kong Stadium
New Zealand | 28
Wales | 5
30 March 2014 – 12:34 – Hong Kong Stadium
Australia | 14
Canada | 12

Semi-finals
30 March 2014 – 15:52 – Hong Kong Stadium
Fiji | 10
England | 17
30 March 2014 – 16:14 – Hong Kong Stadium
New Zealand | 19
Australia | 7

Final
30 March 2014 – 19:00 – Hong Kong Stadium
England | 7
New Zealand | 26
Third place
30 March 2014 – 18:25 – Hong Kong Stadium
Fiji | 21
Australia | 12

== World Series Qualifier ==
The draw was made on 23 March.

Key to colours in group tables
| Teams that advance to the Qualifier quarterfinal |

=== Pool stage ===
==== Pool E ====
| Pos | Team | Pld | W | D | L | PF | PA | PD | Pts |
|---|---|---|---|---|---|---|---|---|---|
| 1 | Zimbabwe | 3 | 3 | 0 | 0 | 82 | 24 | +58 | 9 |
| 2 | Russia | 3 | 2 | 0 | 1 | 69 | 41 | +28 | 7 |
| 3 | Chile | 3 | 1 | 0 | 2 | 60 | 38 | +22 | 5 |
| 4 | Barbados | 3 | 0 | 0 | 3 | 15 | 123 | −108 | 3 |

28 March 2014
15:28

| Russia | 19–17 | Chile |
| | Report |

Hong Kong Stadium, Hong Kong

28 March 2014
15:50

| Zimbabwe | 49–5 | Barbados |
| | Report |

Hong Kong Stadium, Hong Kong

28 March 2014
17:40

| Russia | 45–10 | Barbados |
| | Report |

Hong Kong Stadium, Hong Kong

28 March 2014
18:02

| Zimbabwe | 19–14 | Chile |
| | Report |

Hong Kong Stadium, Hong Kong

29 March 2014
09:44

| Chile | 29–0 | Barbados |
| | Report |

Hong Kong Stadium, Hong Kong

29 March 2014
10:50

| Russia | 5–14 | Zimbabwe |
| | Report |

Hong Kong Stadium, Hong Kong

==== Pool F ====
| Pos | Team | Pld | W | D | L | PF | PA | PD | Pts |
|---|---|---|---|---|---|---|---|---|---|
| 1 | Hong Kong | 3 | 3 | 0 | 0 | 76 | 14 | +62 | 9 |
| 2 | Italy | 3 | 2 | 0 | 1 | 48 | 43 | +5 | 7 |
| 3 | Tunisia | 3 | 1 | 0 | 2 | 33 | 41 | −8 | 5 |
| 4 | American Samoa | 3 | 0 | 0 | 3 | 24 | 83 | −59 | 3 |

28 March 2014
14:44

| Hong Kong | 19–7 | Tunisia |
| | Report |

Hong Kong Stadium, Hong Kong

28 March 2014
15:06

| Italy | 31–12 | American Samoa |
| | Report |

Hong Kong Stadium, Hong Kong

28 March 2014
16:56

| Hong Kong | 38–7 | American Samoa |
| | Report |

Hong Kong Stadium, Hong Kong

28 March 2014
17:18

| Italy | 17–12 | Tunisia |
| | Report |

Hong Kong Stadium, Hong Kong

29 March 2014
09:22

| Tunisia | 14–5 | American Samoa |
| | Report |

Hong Kong Stadium, Hong Kong

29 March 2014
10:28

| Hong Kong | 19–0 | Italy |
| | Report |

Hong Kong Stadium, Hong Kong

==== Pool G ====
| Pos | Team | Pld | W | D | L | PF | PA | PD | Pts |
|---|---|---|---|---|---|---|---|---|---|
| 1 | Japan | 3 | 3 | 0 | 0 | 91 | 7 | +84 | 9 |
| 2 | Uruguay | 3 | 2 | 0 | 1 | 59 | 34 | +25 | 7 |
| 3 | Cook Islands | 3 | 1 | 0 | 2 | 33 | 64 | −31 | 5 |
| 4 | Trinidad and Tobago | 3 | 0 | 0 | 3 | 12 | 90 | −78 | 3 |

28 March 2014
14:00

| Japan | 24–0 | Uruguay |
| | Report |

Hong Kong Stadium, Hong Kong

28 March 2014
14:22

| Cook Islands | 21–7 | Trinidad and Tobago |
| | Report |

Hong Kong Stadium, Hong Kong

28 March 2014
16:12

| Japan | 41–0 | Trinidad and Tobago |
| | Report |

Hong Kong Stadium, Hong Kong

28 March 2014
16:24

| Cook Islands | 5–31 | Uruguay |
| | Report |

Hong Kong Stadium, Hong Kong

29 March 2014
09:00

| Uruguay | 28–5 | Trinidad and Tobago |
| | Report |

Hong Kong Stadium, Hong Kong

29 March 2014
10:06

| Japan | 26–7 | Cook Islands |
| | Report |

Hong Kong Stadium, Hong Kong

=== Ranking matches ===
Qualifier Quarterfinals
29 March 2014 – 16:42 – Hong Kong Stadium
Japan | 38
Tunisia | 7
29 March 2014 – 17:04 – Hong Kong Stadium
Russia | 21
Uruguay | 14
29 March 2014 – 17:26 – Hong Kong Stadium
Zimbabwe | 12
Italy | 17
29 March 2014 – 17:48 – Hong Kong Stadium
Hong Kong | 10
Chile | 7

Qualifier Semifinals
30 March – 12:56 – Hong Kong Stadium
Japan | 19
Russia | 14
30 March – 13:18 – Hong Kong Stadium
Italy | 12
Hong Kong | 0

Qualifier Final
30 March – 16:36 – Hong Kong Stadium
Japan | 26
Italy | 5
