= Fugalei =

South Pacific islet of Wallis and Futuna

Coordinates: 13°16′50″S 176°8′47″W

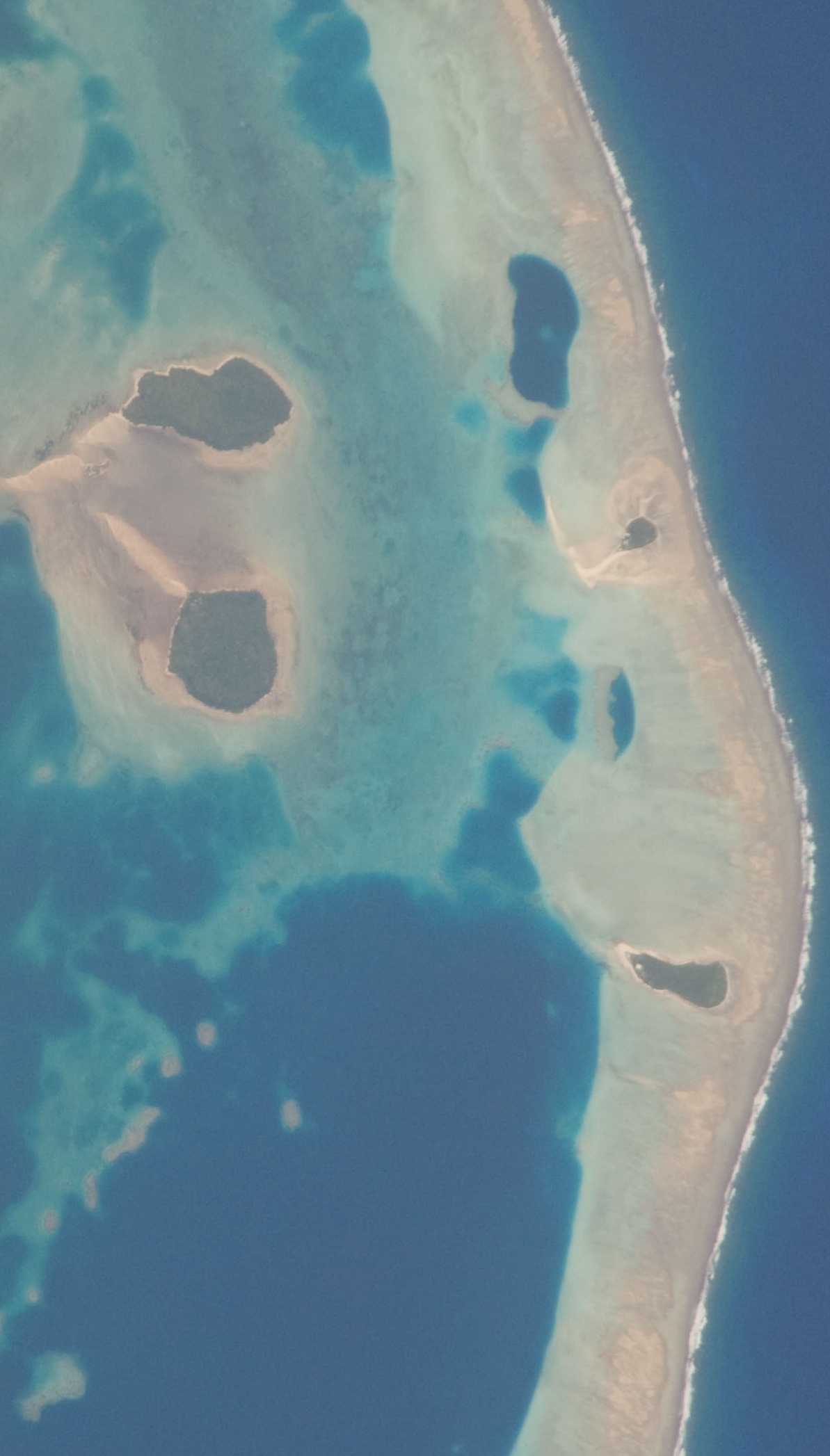
Space view of the Wallis island lagoon including Fugalei

Fugalei is an islet of Wallis and Futuna. It is located off the east coast of Mata-Utu, Wallis Island.
