= Luaniva =

Coordinates: 13°16′20″S 176°8′52″W

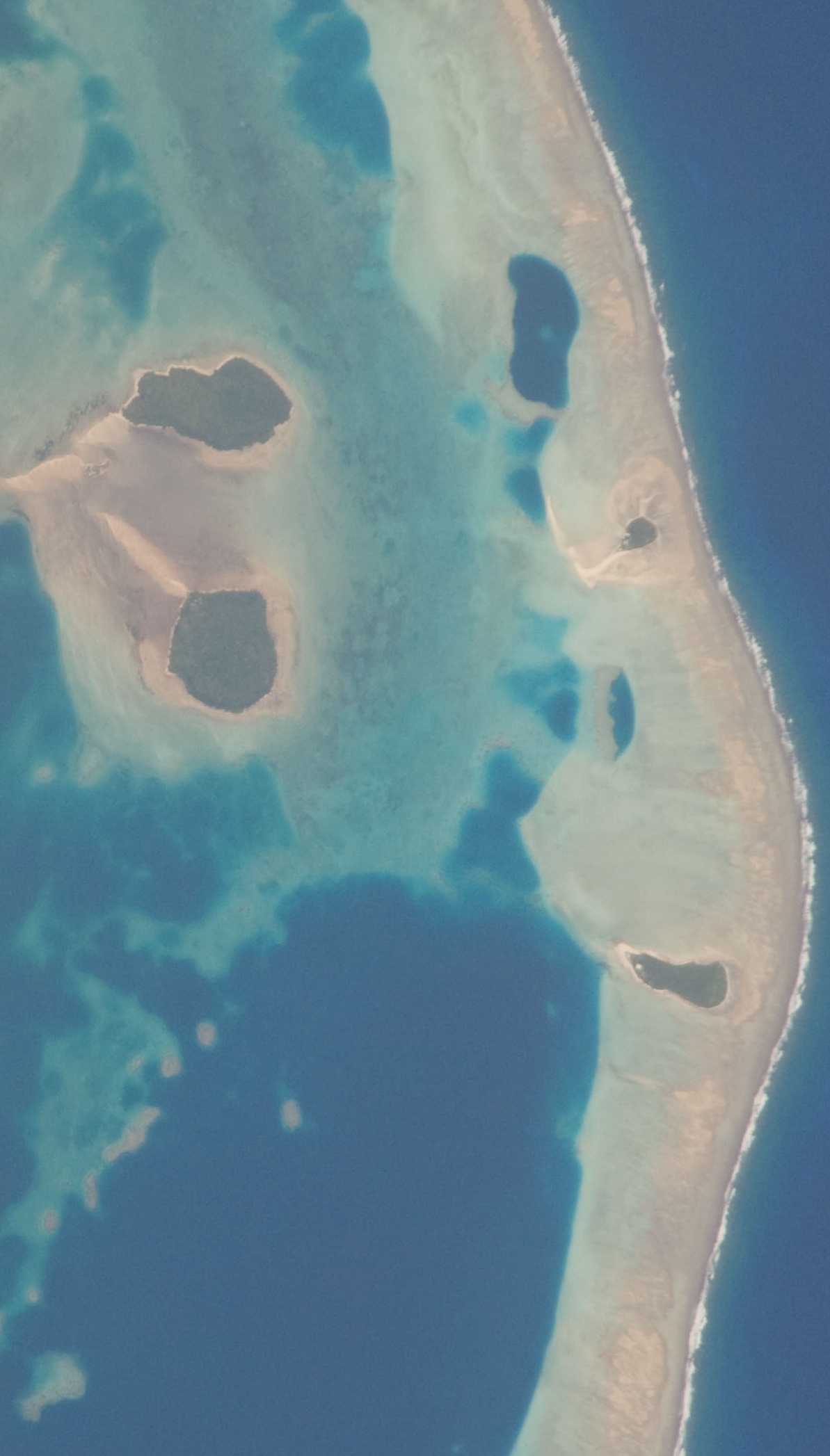
Space view of the Wallis island lagoon including Luaniva island

Luaniva is an islet of Wallis and Futuna. It is located off the east coast of Mata-Utu, Wallis Island.
