= Stade Lomipeau =

Sports venue in Wallis and Futuna

Coordinates: 13°16′30″S 176°10′21″W

Stade Lomipeau is a stadium in Mata-Utu, Wallis Island, Wallis and Futuna.
