= 2017 Oceania Sevens Championship =

Men's rugby sevens championship held in Fiji in 2017

- Host nation: Fiji
- Date: 10–11 November

Cup
- Champion: Fiji
- Runner-up: New Zealand
- Third: Australia; Samoa

The 2017 Oceania Sevens Championship was the tenth Oceania Sevens in men's rugby sevens. It was held at ANZ Stadium in Suva, Fiji on 10–11 November 2017. The tournament was won by Fiji who defeated New Zealand 26–0 in the final.

== Qualifiers ==
Aside from Australia, Fiji, New Zealand and Samoa, the tournament serves as a qualifier for the following:

- The 2018 Hong Kong Sevens qualifier tournament, with the top two competing for a chance to be a core team for the 2018–19 World Rugby Sevens Series.
- 2018 Rugby World Cup Sevens, with the best performing team advancing. The second Oceania slot will be allocated to the winner of the 2017 Pacific Mini Games on 8−9 December.
- 2018 Commonwealth Games, with the best-performing member of the Commonwealth of Nations qualifying.

== Teams ==
Participating nations for the 2017 tournament are:

- American Samoa
- Australia
- Cook Islands
- Fiji
- Nauru
- New Caledonia
- New Zealand
- Papua New Guinea
- Samoa
- Solomon Islands
- Tonga
- Tuvalu
- Vanuatu

== Pool stage ==
All times are Fiji Summer Time (UTC+13:00)

Key to colours in group tables
Teams that advanced to the Championship quarter-finals
Teams that advanced to the 9th-12th ranking semi-final
Eliminated

=== Pool A ===
Teams	Pld	W	D	L	PF	PA	+/−	Pts
Fiji	2	2	0	0	59	5	+54	6
American Samoa	2	0	1	1	19	38	−19	3
New Caledonia	2	0	1	1	14	49	−35	3

10 November 2017
13:40

American Samoa	14–14	New Caledonia

10 November 2017
16:40

Fiji	35−0	New Caledonia

10 November 2017
19:40

Fiji	24−5	American Samoa

=== Pool B ===
Teams	Pld	W	D	L	PF	PA	+/−	Pts
New Zealand	2	2	0	0	82	0	+82	6
Cook Islands	2	1	0	1	27	36	−9	4
Nauru	2	0	0	2	0	73	−73	2

10 November 2017
13:20

Cook Islands	27–0	Nauru

10 November 2017
16:20

New Zealand	46−0	Nauru

10 November 2017
19:20

New Zealand	36−0	Cook Islands

=== Pool C ===
Teams	Pld	W	D	L	PF	PA	+/−	Pts
Australia	2	2	0	0	75	7	+68	6
Tonga	2	1	0	1	14	24	−10	4
Solomon Islands	2	0	0	2	0	58	−58	2

10 November 2017
13:00

Tonga	7–0	Solomon Islands

10 November 2017
16:00

Australia	51–0	Solomon Islands

10 November 2017
19:00

Australia	24−7	Tonga

=== Pool D ===
Teams	Pld	W	D	L	PF	PA	+/−	Pts
Samoa	3	3	0	0	121	14	+107	9
Papua New Guinea	3	2	0	1	73	41	+32	7
Vanuatu	3	1	0	2	24	85	−61	5
Tuvalu	3	0	0	3	22	100	−78	3

10 November 2017
12:20

Papua New Guinea	26–10	Tuvalu

10 November 2017
12:40

Samoa	40–0	Vanuatu

10 November 2017
15:20

Papua New Guinea	33−0	Vanuatu

10 November 2017
15:40

Samoa	50−0	Tuvalu

10 November 2017
18:20

Vanuatu	24−12	Tuvalu

10 November 2017
18:40

Samoa	31−14	Papua New Guinea

== Knockout stage ==
9th-12th Place

Semi-finals
11 November 2017 – 12:20
Solomon Islands	19
Vanuatu	0
11 November 2017 – 12:40
New Caledonia	34
Nauru	10

Ninth Place
11 November 2017 - 16:26
Solomon Islands	N/A (Note: Due to adverse weather conditions affecting the schedule of games, all classification finals except the fifth-place playoff and Championship Final were cancelled. The fifth-place match was played because of qualification implications.)
New Caledonia
Eleventh Place
11 November 2017 - 16:06
Vanuatu	N/A
Nauru

5th-8th Place

Quarter-finals
11 November 2017 – 11:00
Australia	22
Papua New Guinea	21
11 November 2017 – 11:20
New Zealand	58
American Samoa	0
11 November 2017 – 11:40
Samoa	45
Tonga	0
11 November 2017 – 12:00
Fiji	57
Cook Islands	0

Semi-finals
11 November 2017 – 14:20
Papua New Guinea	22
American Samoa	7
11 November 2017 – 14:40
Tonga	5
Cook Islands	12

Fifth Place
11 November 2017 - 17:26
Papua New Guinea	32
Cook Islands	0
Seventh Place
11 November 2017 - 16:46
American Samoa	N/A
Tonga

Championship

Quarter-finals
11 November 2017 – 11:00
Australia	22
Papua New Guinea	21
11 November 2017 – 11:20
New Zealand	58
American Samoa	0
11 November 2017 – 11:40
Samoa	45
Tonga	0
11 November 2017 – 12:00
Fiji	57
Cook Islands	0

Semi-finals
11 November 2017 – 15:00
Australia	0
New Zealand	31
11 November 2017 – 15:20
Samoa	7
Fiji	17

Final
11 November 2017 - 18:46
New Zealand	0
Fiji	26
Third place
11 November 2017 - 18:06
Australia	N/A
Samoa

== Placings ==
Place	Team
1st place, gold medalist(s)	Fiji
2nd place, silver medalist(s)	New Zealand
3rd place, bronze medalist(s)	Australia
3rd place, bronze medalist(s)	Samoa
5	Papua New Guinea
6	Cook Islands

Place	Team
7	American Samoa
7	Tonga
9	New Caledonia
9	Solomon Islands
11	Nauru
11	Vanuatu
13	Tuvalu

Legend
Green fill	Qualified to 2018 Rugby World Cup Sevens and 2018 Commonwealth Games
Dark bar	Gained entry to the 2018 Hong Kong Sevens qualifying tournament for the 2019 World Rugby Sevens Series
Light bar	Already a core team in World Rugby Sevens Series

== See also ==
- 2018 Rugby World Cup Sevens qualifying – Men
- Rugby sevens at the 2018 Commonwealth Games – Men's tournament
- 2017 Oceania Women's Sevens Championship
