= Rugby union in Tokelau =

Rugby union is a popular sport in Tokelau.

== History ==
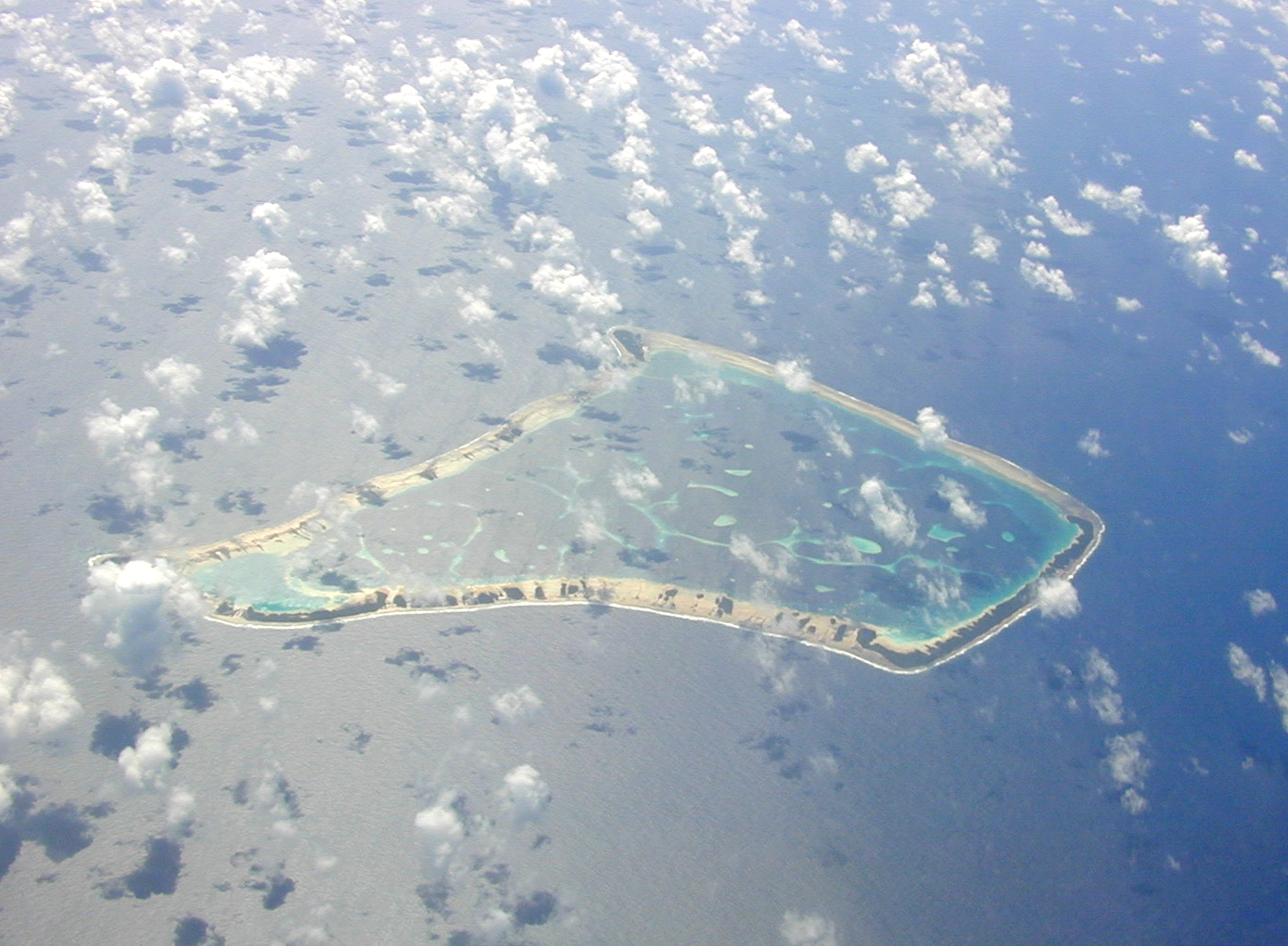
The atoll of Fakaofo: rugby is popular in the islands, but is hindered by geographical factors, such as distance, and lack of space.

Like many other Pacific nations, Tokelauan rugby is a popular, but often not formally organised sport. Tokelauans due to their small numbers, and scattered island population, have often preferred rugby sevens to the XV game, although Tokelau did play rugby 15s at the 1983 South Pacific Games, including a creditable 15–28 loss to PNG, a much larger Pacific nation. Rugby sevens has been a sport in the South Pacific Games since the late 1990s.

There is also a semi-formal league structure.

Tokelau's main problems are related to population and geographical factors - its population is a mere 1,416, and lives on three widely separated tropical coral atolls in the South Pacific Ocean. All of this makes a rugby infrastructure difficult to construct, and the islands are beset by rising sea levels. The geographic future of Tokelau depends on the height of the ocean. No significant land is more than two metres above high water of ordinary tides. This means Tokelau is particularly vulnerable to any possible sea level rises caused by global warming. There is also a lack of land for specifically designated rugby pitches.

Tokelau's close relationship with New Zealand and Australia, however, ensures that rugby union gets a lot of media coverage in Tokelau.

Tokelau took part in a rugby sevens tournament in the Cook Islands in June 2009.

=== Rugby league comparison ===
As is the case with most Pacific Islands, rugby league has had a presence in Tokelau since the late 1980s. However, like some other national rugby league teams, the national side has relied on Australian and New Zealand based players with Tokelauan heritage to bolster its strength.

== See also ==
- Tokelau national rugby sevens team
