= Tuvalu Rugby Union =

Sports governing body in Tuvalu

- Sport: Rugby union
- Founded: 2007
- FORU affiliation: 2011

The Tuvalu Rugby Union, or TRU, is the governing body for rugby union in Tuvalu. It also organises the Rugby Sevens competitions. It was established in 2007 and is a full member of the Federation of Oceania Rugby Unions (FORU), which is the regional governing body for rugby in Oceania.

Tuvalu participates in the Rugby Sevens competitions at the Pacific Games and the Oceania Sevens Championship.

== See also ==
- Tuvalu national rugby sevens team
- Rugby union in Tuvalu
