= Rugby union in Tuvalu =

Rugby union is played in Tuvalu. Unlike most South Pacific islands, rugby union is largely played on an informal basis alongside association football, which is the main sport played by Tuvaluans.

The Tuvalu Rugby Union, an organising body for Rugby Union, was established in 2007 with the intention of forming a national team. Rugby sevens was first introduced to Tuvalu in 2007.

== History ==
Rugby is played at the two secondary schools; Fetuvalu Secondary School, a day school located on Funafuti, and Motufoua Secondary School, a boarding school located on Vaitupu. They have their own internal tournaments.

The club level rugby competition has eight clubs, all based on the main island of Funafuti. However all teams attract supporters based on the home island of the team members, such as the 'Niutao Sharks'. The Tuvalu Sports Ground is shared with the association football competition. Training activities are also carried out at the Funafuti International Airport, which is a shared facility, used for sport and recreational activities.

The Tuvalu Rugby Union also selects a national team. Tuvalu participated in the Rugby Sevens competition in the XIVth Pacific Games in 2011. It is also a featured sport at the Tuvalu Games.

Tuvalu's main problems are geographical - its population of 11,992 makes it the third-least-populated independent country in the world, with only Vatican City and Nauru having fewer inhabitants. It is also one of the smallest members by population of the United Nations. In terms of physical land size, at just 26 square kilometres (10 sq mi) Tuvalu is the fourth smallest country in the world, larger only than the Vatican City—0.44 km^{2}; Monaco—1.95 km^{2} and Nauru—21 km^{2}. It comprises four reef islands and five true atolls. All of this makes a rugby infrastructure difficult to construct.

Tuvalu's close relationship with New Zealand and Australia, however, ensures that rugby union gets a lot of media coverage in Tuvalu.

== See also ==
- Tuvalu national rugby sevens team
- Tuvalu Rugby Union
