= Nukuhione =

Coordinates: 13°16′24″S 176°7′51″W

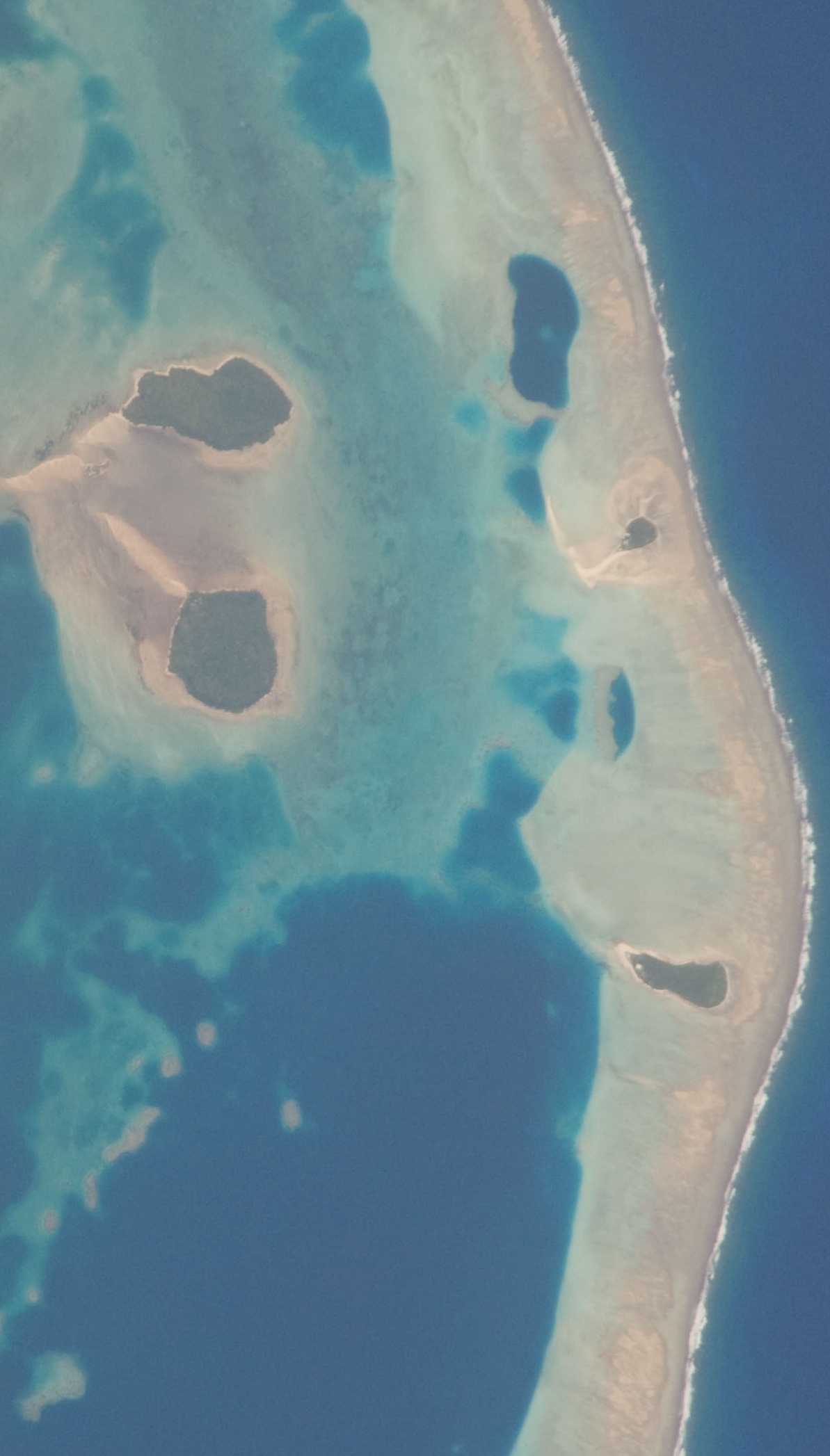
Space view of the Wallis island lagoon including Nukuhione island

Nukuhione is an islet of Wallis and Futuna. It is located off the east coast of Mata-Utu, Wallis Island.
