= Tahiti national rugby sevens team =

Tahiti
- Union: Tahiti Rugby Union
Team kit	Change kit

Largest win
- Tahiti 29 – 0 Guam _{(9 July 2015, Pacific Games)}

Largest defeat
- Tahiti 0 – 64 Fiji _{(3 October 2014), Pacific Games)}

World Cup Sevens
- Appearances: 0

The Tahiti national rugby sevens team competes in the Pacific Games and the Oceania Sevens. In the 2011 Pacific Games held in New Caledonia they finished in 10th place losing to Vanuatu 7–17 in the Ninth place playoffs.

== Squad ==
Squad to the 2023 Pacific Games:

Players
Kehea Avaeoru
Hoanui Coppenrath
François Duval
Tamarua Ganahoa
Axel Guillo
Philippe Idjeri
Teuira Lependu
Louca Lima
Julien Ma’ama’atuaiahutapu
Ruroa Mairau
Ta’aroa Tuarai-Ticchi
Tefana Tufaimea

== Tournament History ==
=== Pacific Games ===
Pacific Games
Year	Round	Position	Pld	W	D	L
(Guam) 1999	Plate Final	5th	6	4	0	2
(Fiji) 2003	7th Place Playoff	N/A	4	1	0	3
(Samoa) 2007	7th Place Playoff	7th	6	3	0	3
(New Caledonia) 2011	9th Place Playoff	10th	5	2	0	3
(Papua New Guinea) 2015	7th Place Playoff	7th	7	2	0	5
(Samoa) 2019	Did Not Compete					
(Solomon Islands) 2023	9th Place Playoff	10th	5	2	0	3
Total	0 Titles	6/7	33	14	0	19

=== Oceania Sevens ===
Oceania Sevens
Year	Round	Position	Pld	W	D	L
(Samoa) 2008	7th Place Playoff	8th	5	0	0	5
(French Polynesia) 2009	Plate Semifinal	7th	7	0	0	7
(Australia) 2010	7th Place Playoff	7th	6	1	0	5
(Samoa) 2011	Did Not Compete					
(Australia) 2012	7th Place Playoff	7th	6	0	0	6
(Fiji) 2013	Did Not Compete					
(Australia) 2014	11th Place Playoff	12th	5	0	0	5
2015–23	Did Not Compete					
Total	0 Titles	5/15	29	1	0	28

== See also ==
- Rugby union in Tahiti
