= Wallis and Futuna Rugby Committee =

Comité Territorial de Rugby Wallis et Futuna
- Sport: Rugby union
- Founded: 1960s (est.)
- Oceania Rugby affiliation: 2000
- Website: rugby.loina.wf

The Wallis and Futuna Rugby Committee (French: Comité de Rugby Wallis et Futuna, —or officially: Comité Territorial de Rugby Wallis et Futuna) is a committee under the umbrella of the French Rugby Federation which is the governing body for rugby union within Wallis and Futuna.

It is an associate member of the Oceania Rugby, which is the regional governing body for Oceania, but it is not affiliated with World Rugby in its own right.

== National teams ==
Wallis and Futuna first played international 15-a-side rugby in 1966 at the South Pacific Games (as it was then called), but has since switched focus onto playing rugby sevens. The Wallis and Futuna team has competed at 7-a-side rugby tournaments in recent Pacific Games.

== See also ==
- Rugby union in Wallis and Futuna
- Wallis and Futuna national rugby union team (sevens)
- Wallis and Futuna national rugby union team, currently inactive
