= Mikaele Tuugahala =

- Born: April 28, 1976 (age 50) Wallis and Futuna
- Height: 1.86 m (6 ft 1 in)
- Weight: 115 kg (254 lb)
- Notable relative: Jocelino Suta (cousin)

Rugby union career
- Position: Prop
- Current team: Racing Metro
Senior career
Years	Team	Apps	(Points)
1998	Paita SA		
2001-2007	Stade Montois		
2007-Present	Racing Metro	10	(0)
- Correct as of 9 January 2011
- Correct as of 9 January 2011

Mikaele Tuugahala (b. April 28, 1976 in Wallis and Futuna) is a French rugby union player. He plays at the Prop position and currently plays for Racing Métro 92. He is the cousin of Toulon Loose forward Jocelino Suta.

== Career ==
Tuugahala started playing rugby in 1998 for Paita SA in New Caledonia. From 2001 to 2007 he played for Stade Montois. In 2007 he moved to Racing Métro 92 where he currently plays.
