= 2015 Oceania Sevens Championship =

- Host nation: New Zealand
- Date: 14–15 November 2015

Cup
- Champion: Australia
- Runner-up: Tonga
- Third: Samoa

Plate
- Winner: Cook Islands
- Runner-up: Solomon Islands
- Third: American Samoa

The 2015 Oceania Sevens Championship was the eighth Oceania Sevens. It was held in West Auckland, New Zealand on 14–15 November 2015. As well as determining the regional championship, the tournament was also a qualifying event for the 2016 Olympics sevens, with the highest-placed eligible team gaining a direct berth to Rio de Janeiro.

Australia won the tournament, defeating Tonga 50–0 in the final. The second and third place getters Tonga and Samoa received invitations to the final qualification tournament. Fiji and New Zealand did not participate in the 2015 Oceania Sevens as they had already qualified for the 2016 Olympics.

== Teams ==
Participating nations for the 2015 tournament are:

- American Samoa
- Australia
- Cook Islands
- Nauru
- Papua New Guinea
- Samoa
- Solomon Islands
- Tonga

== Pool stage ==
Key to colours in group tables
Teams that advanced to the Cup Quarterfinal

All times are New Zealand Daylight Time, i.e. UTC+13.

=== Pool A ===
Team	Pld	W	D	L	PF	PA	PD	Pts
Australia	3	3	0	0	159	7	+152	9
Tonga	3	2	0	1	74	49	+25	7
Cook Islands	3	1	0	2	52	77	–25	5
Nauru	3	0	0	3	0	152	–152	3

14 November 2015
11:28

Tonga	29–0	Cook Islands

The Trusts Arena, Henderson, New Zealand

14 November 2015
11:50

Australia	62–0	Nauru

The Trusts Arena, Henderson, New Zealand

14 November 2015
14:04

Tonga	45–0	Nauru

The Trusts Arena, Henderson, New Zealand

14 November 2015
14:26

Australia	48–7	Cook Islands

The Trusts Arena, Henderson, New Zealand

14 November 2015
16:40

Cook Islands	45–0	Nauru

The Trusts Arena, Henderson, New Zealand

14 November 2015
17:02

Australia	49–0	Tonga

The Trusts Arena, Henderson, New Zealand

=== Pool B ===
Team	Pld	W	D	L	PF	PA	PD	Pts
Samoa	3	3	0	0	139	7	+132	9
Papua New Guinea	3	2	0	1	106	41	+65	7
Solomon Islands	3	1	0	2	17	107	–90	4
American Samoa	3	0	0	3	7	114	–107	3

14 November 2015
10:44

Papua New Guinea	47–0	American Samoa

The Trusts Arena, Henderson, New Zealand

14 November 2015
11:06

Samoa	48–0	Solomon Islands

The Trusts Arena, Henderson, New Zealand

14 November 2015
13:20

Papua New Guinea	52–0	Solomon Islands

The Trusts Arena, Henderson, New Zealand

14 November 2015
13:42

Samoa	50–0	American Samoa

The Trusts Arena, Henderson, New Zealand

14 November 2015
15:56

American Samoa	7–17	Solomon Islands

The Trusts Arena, Henderson, New Zealand

14 November 2015
16:18

Samoa	41–7	Papua New Guinea

The Trusts Arena, Henderson, New Zealand

== Knockout stage ==
=== Plate ===
5th–8th semi-finals
15 November 2015 - The Trusts Arena, West Auckland
Solomon Islands	31
Nauru	5
15 November 2015 - The Trusts Arena, West Auckland
Cook Islands	24
American Samoa	19

5th–6th play-off
15 November 2015 - The Trusts Arena, West Auckland
Solomon Islands	14
Cook Islands	17
7th–8th play-off
15 November 2015 - The Trusts Arena, West Auckland
Nauru	12
American Samoa	33

=== Cup ===
Quarter-finals
15 November 2015 - The Trusts Arena, West Auckland
Tonga	47
Solomon Islands	0
15 November 2015 - The Trusts Arena, West Auckland
Samoa	59
Nauru	0
15 November 2015 - The Trusts Arena, West Auckland
Papua New Guinea	19
Cook Islands	7
15 November 2015 - The Trusts Arena, West Auckland
Australia	52
American Samoa	0

Semi-finals
15 November 2015 - The Trusts Arena, West Auckland
Tonga	41
Samoa	5
15 November 2015 - The Trusts Arena, West Auckland
Papua New Guinea	0
Australia	36

Final
15 November 2015 - The Trusts Arena, West Auckland
Tonga	0
Australia	50
Third place
15 November 2015 - The Trusts Arena, West Auckland
Samoa	54
Papua New Guinea	0

== Final standings ==
Legend
Winner of qualification position for the 2016 Summer Olympics.
Winner of qualification position for the Final Olympic qualification tournament.

Rank	Team
1st place, gold medalist(s)	Australia
2nd place, silver medalist(s)	Tonga
3rd place, bronze medalist(s)	Samoa
4	Papua New Guinea
5	Cook Islands
6	Solomon Islands
7	American Samoa
8	Nauru

Tonga and Papua New Guinea also qualified to the 2016 Hong Kong Sevens World Series qualifier.

== See also ==
- 2015 Oceania Women's Sevens Championship
