= New Caledonia national rugby sevens team =

New Caledonia
- Union: New Caledonia Rugby Committee
Team kit

The New Caledonia national rugby sevens team is a minor sporting side that represents New Caledonia in rugby sevens. They finished in sixth place at the 2011 Pacific Games.

== History ==
In 2015, New Caledonia were placed in the same pool with defending champions, Samoa, and were joined by Tonga, Vanuatu, and Nauru for the Pacific Games in Port Moresby. In their opening match of the 2019 Pacific Games, they faced Fiji and were thrashed 47–0. They also competed at the 2019 Oceania Sevens Championship in Fiji.

== Tournament History ==
=== Pacific Games ===
Pacific Games
Year	Round	Position	Pld	W	D	L
(Guam) 1999	Plate Final	6th	6	1	0	5
(Fiji) 2003	9th Place Play-off	9th	6	3	0	3
(Samoa) 2007	Bowl Final	9th	5	1	0	4
(New Caledonia) 2011	5th Place Play-off	6th	6	3	0	3
(Papua New Guinea) 2015	5th Place Play-off	5th	7	4	0	3
(Samoa) 2019	7th Place Play-off	8th	5	2	0	3
(Solomon Islands) 2023	TBD					
Total	0 Titles	6/6	35	14	0	21

=== Oceania Sevens ===
Oceania Sevens
Year	Round	Position	Pld	W	D	L
(Samoa) 2008	Did Not Compete					
(French Polynesia) 2009	Did Not Compete					
(Australia) 2010	Did Not Compete					
(Samoa) 2011	Bowl Final	9th	5	1	0	4
(Australia) 2012	Did Not Compete					
(Fiji) 2013	Did Not Compete					
(Australia) 2014	11th Place Play-off	11th	5	1	0	4
(New Zealand) 2015	Did Not Compete					
(Fiji) 2016	7th Place Play-off	8th	6	1	0	5
(Fiji) 2017	— (Note: Due to adverse weather conditions affecting the schedule of games, all classification finals except the fifth-place playoff and Championship Final were cancelled. The fifth-place match was played because of qualification implications.)	9th	3	1	1	1
(Fiji) 2018	7th Place Play-off	8th	5	1	0	4
(Fiji) 2019	13th Place Play-off	14th	6	1	0	5
(Australia) 2021	Did Not Compete					
(New Zealand) 2022	Did Not Compete					
(Australia) 2023	Did Not Compete					
Total	0 Titles	6/15	30	6	1	23

== Players ==
Squad to 2015 Pacific Games:

- Vaitanaki, Jofrey
- Talau Baptiste
- Vaisioa Ervin
- Palasio Bell
- Abry, Arnaud
- Jean Jacques Taputai
- Emmanuel Roche
- Gabriel Keletaona
- Alexandre Keletaona
- Petelo Falevalu
- Jacques Dihace
- Nisie Huyard

=== Previous Squads ===
2011 Pacific Games Squad
- Joffrey Vaitanaki
- Desire Takatai
- Petelo Folautanoa
- Marcel Kauma
- Arnaud Abry
- Teva Legras
- Nicolas Pavlovski
- Malesio Maituku
- Freidy Totele
- Teddy Grondin
- Roy Wemama
