= Stade Laione Rugby =

Stadium in Mata-Utu, Wallis and Futuna

Coordinates: 13°16′39″S 176°10′28″W

Stade Laione Rugby is a 1,000-capacity stadium in Mata-Utu, Wallis Island, Wallis and Futuna.
