= Jocelino Suta =

French rugby union player (born 1982)

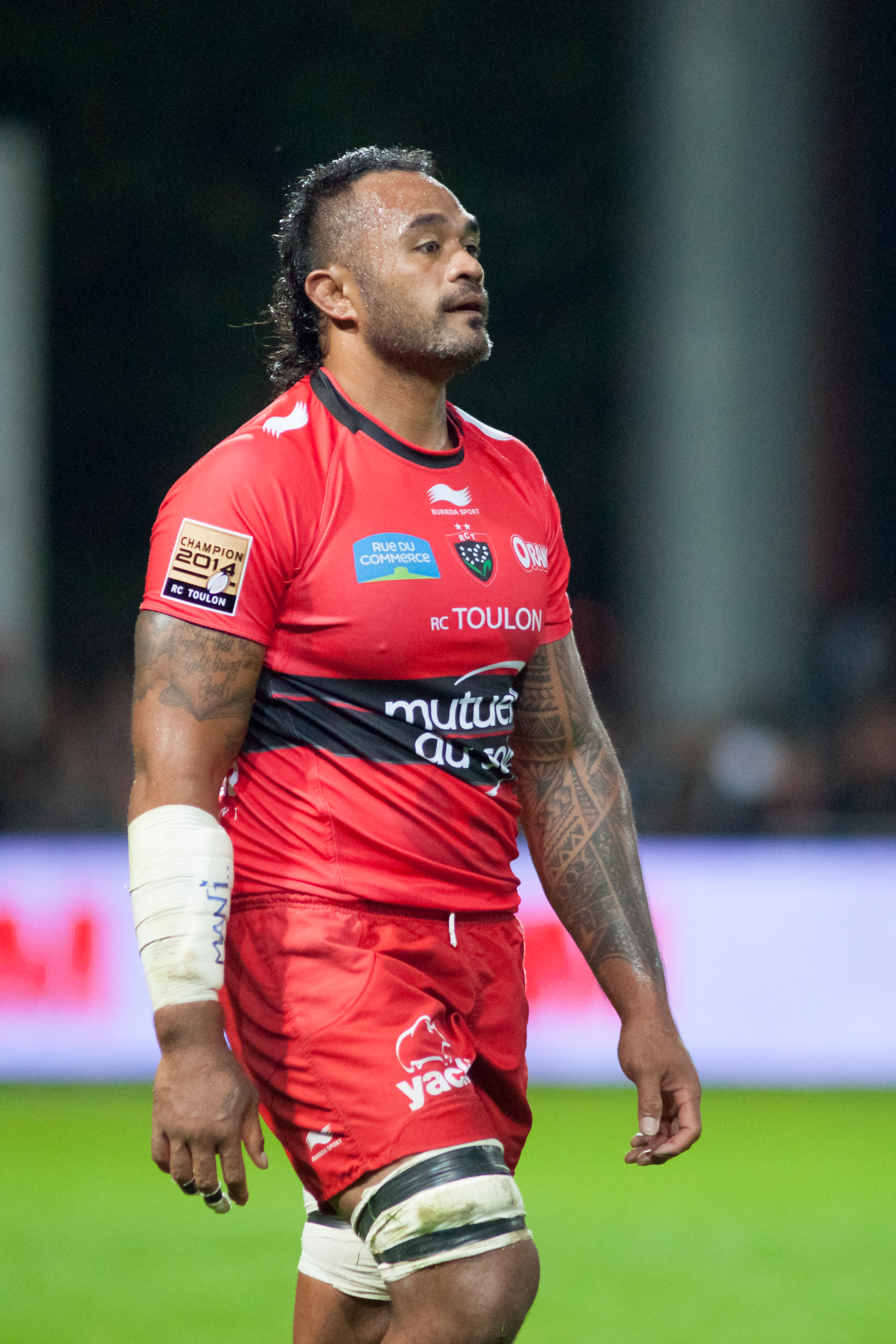
- Jocelino Suta - US Oyonnax vs. Rugby Club Toulonnais, 3 October 2014
- Born: 18 November 1982 (age 43) Wallis and Futuna
- Height: 1.95 m (6 ft 5 in)
- Weight: 112 kg (247 lb)

Rugby union career
- Position: Lock
- Current team: Toulon
Senior career
Years	Team	Apps	(Points)
2005–2008	Stade Montois	51	(10)
2008–2018	Toulon	233	(35)
- Correct as of 17 February 2018
International career
Years	Team	Apps	(Points)
2012–2013	France	6	(0)
- Correct as of 28 February 2013

Jocelino Suta (born 18 November 1982 in Port Vila) is a French rugby union player who plays as a lock for RC Toulonnais.

After his birth in Port Vila, capital of the Republic of Vanuatu, located in the heart of the Pacific near Fiji, Jocelino Suta grew up in Wallis-etFutuna, a French archipelago, from which his parents originated, and then in New Caledonia where he was educated from the age of 10.

He is the cousin of prop Mikaele Tuugahala. After the 2007-08 Rugby Pro D2 season led to a promotion for Stade Montois to the Top 14, he planned on joining Racing Métro 92 Paris. Since the club stayed in Pro D2, he moved to RC Toulonnais, another promoted club. In May 2013 he played as a replacement as Toulon won the 2013 Heineken Cup Final by 16–15 against Clermont Auvergne.

Suta debuted for France in 2012 against Australia on 10 November.

== Career ==
- Until 2008 : Stade Montois (trained at club) (France)
- Since 2008 : RC Toulon (France)

== Honours ==
=== Club ===
- Winner of the finals of Pro D2 : 2008

=== National team ===
- French Barbarians in 2008 (Canada)
