= Uvea Museum Association =

Museum in Wallis and Futuna

Coordinates: 13°16′54.25″S 176°11′10.22″W

- Location: Mata Utu, Wallis and Futuna
- Type: Military museum
- Website: https://www.facebook.com/Uvea-Museum-Association-837279249955017/

Uvea Museum Association is a private museum on the island of Wallis, in the French overseas territory of Wallis and Futuna. Located in the Mata Utu shopping centre, it is arranged thematically, and visits are by appointment only. The museum was founded by Eric Pambrun and Christophe Laurent.

1943 color movie of a Wallisian dance called Faka Niutao

Its collection comprises objects that reflect the history of the island in the Second World War. The collection also includes the first 16mm film shot on the island, which records a faka Niutao dance in 1943. Several objects in the collection have been donated by American veterans who served on Wallis.

The museum has loaned objects from its collection to other institutions. Notably, a 1942 Coca-Cola bottle left behind by American troops during their occupation of the island was lent to Musée du Vivant-AgroParisTech.
