= Rugby sevens at the 2011 Pacific Games – Men's tournament =

2011 Pacific Games Men's Rugby 7s
Tournament details
- Host nation: 2011 Pacific Games Men's Rugby 7s
- Venue: Stade Numa Daly, Nouméa
- Dates: 31 August – 2 September 2011
- No. of nations: 12

Final positions
- Champions: Samoa

The 2011 Pacific Games men's rugby sevens tournament was held in New Caledonia from 31 August to 2 September 2011 in Nouméa. Samoa won the gold medal defeating Fiji by 21–19 in the final. Papua New Guinea took the bronze medal defeating Niue 10–5 in the third place match.

== Participants ==
- American Samoa
- Fiji
- New Caledonia
- Niue
- Papua New Guinea
- Samoa
- Solomon Islands
- Tahiti
- Tokelau
- Tuvalu
- Vanuatu
- Wallis and Futuna

== Format ==
The 12 teams were drawn into 3 groups. The top 2 teams from the first stage alongside the best two third placed teams advanced to the quarterfinal stage. The quarterfinals and semifinals were followed by the matches for the Gold Medal (first place) and Bronze Medal (third place).

== Preliminary round ==
=== Group A ===
Teams	Pld	W	D	L	PF	PA	+/−	Pts
Fiji	3	3	0	0	174	0	+174	9
Tokelau	3	2	0	1	25	87	−63	7
Tahiti	3	1	0	2	22	69	−47	5
Wallis and Futuna	3	0	0	3	17	81	−64	3
Updated: 2 September 2011 • Teams ranked 1 and 2 (Green background) advanced to the quarterfinals. • Teams ranked 3 and 4 (Blue background) advanced to the 9th–12th semifinals.

31 August 2011
14:26

Tokelau	12 – 5	Tahiti

Stade Numa Daly, Nouméa

31 August 2011
16:38

Fiji	52 – 0	Wallis and Futuna

Stade Numa Daly, Nouméa

1 September 2011
11:06

Fiji	45 – 0	Tahiti

Stade Numa Daly, Nouméa

1 September 2011
13:18

Tokelau	12 – 5	Wallis and Futuna

Stade Numa Daly, Nouméa

1 September 2011
15:30

Tahiti	17 – 12	Wallis and Futuna

Stade Numa Daly, Nouméa

1 September 2011
16:36

Fiji	77 – 0	Tokelau

Stade Numa Daly, Nouméa

=== Group B ===
Teams	Pld	W	D	L	PF	PA	+/−	Pts
Samoa	3	3	0	0	152	12	+140	9
Solomon Islands	3	2	0	1	43	67	−24	7
American Samoa	3	1	0	2	39	81	−42	5
Vanuatu	3	0	0	3	24	98	−74	3
Updated: 2 September 2011 • Teams ranked 1 to 3 (Green background) advanced to the quarterfinals. • The team ranked 4 (Blue background) advanced to the 9th–12th semifinals.

31 August 2011
14:48

Solomon Islands	24 – 5	Vanuatu

Stade Numa Daly, Nouméa

31 August 2011
17:00

Samoa	55 – 0	American Samoa

Stade Numa Daly, Nouméa

1 September 2011
11:28

Samoa	52 – 12	Vanuatu

Stade Numa Daly, Nouméa

1 September 2011
13:40

Solomon Islands	19 – 17	American Samoa

Stade Numa Daly, Nouméa

1 September 2011
15:52

Vanuatu	7 – 22	American Samoa

Stade Numa Daly, Nouméa

1 September 2011
16:58

Samoa	45 – 0	Solomon Islands

Stade Numa Daly, Nouméa

=== Group C ===
Teams	Pld	W	D	L	PF	PA	+/−	Pts
Papua New Guinea	3	3	0	0	94	17	+77	9
New Caledonia	3	2	0	1	65	48	+17	7
Niue	3	1	0	2	70	34	+36	5
Tuvalu	3	0	0	3	0	130	−130	3
Updated: 2 September 2011 • Teams ranked 1 to 3 (Green background) advanced to the quarterfinals. • The team ranked 4 (Blue background) advanced to the 9th–12th semifinals.

31 August 2011
15:10

Niue	12 – 17	New Caledonia

Stade Numa Daly, Nouméa

31 August 2011
17:22

Papua New Guinea	41 – 0	Tuvalu

Stade Numa Daly, Nouméa

1 September 2011
11:50

Papua New Guinea	36 – 7	New Caledonia

Stade Numa Daly, Nouméa

1 September 2011
14:02

Niue	48 – 0	Tuvalu

Stade Numa Daly, Nouméa

1 September 2011
16:14

New Caledonia	41 – 0	Tuvalu

Stade Numa Daly, Nouméa

1 September 2011
17:20

Papua New Guinea	17 – 10	Niue

Stade Numa Daly, Nouméa

== Knockout stage ==
=== Championship bracket ===
Quarter-finals
2 September
Niue	26
Tokelau	0
2 September
Samoa	52
New Caledonia	0
2 September
Papua New Guinea	40
Solomon Islands	5
2 September
Fiji	33
American Samoa	5

Semi-finals
2 September
Niue	0
Samoa	43
2 September
Papua New Guinea	19
Fiji	24

Final
2 September
Samoa	21
Fiji	19
Third place
2 September
Niue	5
Papua New Guinea	10

==== Quarterfinals ====
2 September 2011
13:41

Niue	26 – 0	Tokelau

Stade Numa Daly, Nouméa

2 September 2011
14:03

Papua New Guinea	40 – 5	Solomon Islands

Stade Numa Daly, Nouméa

2 September 2011
14:25

Samoa	52 – 0	New Caledonia

Stade Numa Daly, Nouméa

2 September 2011
14:47

Fiji	33 – 5	American Samoa

Stade Numa Daly, Nouméa

==== Semifinals ====
2 September 2011
17:14

Niue	0 – 43	Samoa

Stade Numa Daly, Nouméa

2 September 2011
17:36

Fiji	24 – 19 (a.e.t.) (Note: The score was 19-all at the end of regular time.)	Papua New Guinea

Stade Numa Daly, Nouméa

==== Third place ====
2 September 2011
19:09

Niue	5 – 10	Papua New Guinea

Stade Numa Daly, Nouméa

==== Final ====
2 September 2011
20:08

Samoa	21 – 19	Fiji

Stade Numa Daly, Nouméa

=== Middle bracket ===
Semifinals
2 September
Tokelau	12
New Caledonia	19
2 September
Solomon Islands	21
American Samoa	26

Fifth place
2 September
New Caledonia	17
American Samoa	19
Third place
2 September
Tokelau	7
Solomon Islands	33

==== 5th–8th semifinals ====
2 September 2011
16:25

Tokelau	12 – 19	New Caledonia

Stade Numa Daly, Nouméa

2 September 2011
16:47

Solomon Islands	21 – 26	American Samoa

Stade Numa Daly, Nouméa

==== Seventh place ====
2 September 2011
18:25

Tokelau	7 – 33	Solomon Islands

Stade Numa Daly, Nouméa

==== Fifth place ====
2 September 2011
18:47

New Caledonia	17 – 19	American Samoa

Stade Numa Daly, Nouméa

=== Lower bracket ===
Semifinals
2 September
Tahiti	17
Tuvalu	12
2 September
Wallis and Futuna	0
Vanuatu	14

Ninth place
2 September
Tahiti	7
Vanuatu	17
Eleventh Place
2 September
Tuvalu	10
Wallis and Futuna	19

==== 9th–12th semifinals ====
2 September 2011
12:30

Tahiti	17 – 12	Tuvalu

Stade Numa Daly, Nouméa

2 September 2011
12:52

Wallis and Futuna	0 – 14	Vanuatu

Stade Numa Daly, Nouméa

==== Eleventh place ====
2 September 2011
15:14

Tuvalu	10 – 19	Wallis and Futuna

Stade Numa Daly, Nouméa

==== Ninth place ====
2 September 2011
15:36

Tahiti	7 – 17	Vanuatu

Stade Numa Daly, Nouméa

== See also ==
- Rugby sevens at the Pacific Games
- Women's Rugby sevens at the 2011 Pacific Games
- Pacific Games
