= Rugby sevens at the 2019 Pacific Games – Men's tournament =

Men's rugby sevens at the 2019 Pacific Games
- Venue: Apia Park
- Dates: 12–13 July 2019
- Teams: 10

Medalists
gold medal	Fiji
silver medal	Samoa
bronze medal	Tonga

The men's rugby sevens tournament at the 2019 Pacific Games was held in Samoa from 12 to 13 July 2019. It was hosted at the St Joseph's Sports Field in Lotopa. Fiji won the gold medal with a 7–5 victory over Samoa in the final.

== Participating nations ==
Ten teams with 12 players in each squad played in the tournament.

- American Samoa
- Cook Islands
- Fiji
- Nauru
- New Caledonia
- Samoa
- Solomon Islands
- Tonga
- Tuvalu
- Wallis and Futuna

== Pool stages ==
=== Pool A ===
Teams	Pld	W	D	L	PF	PA	+/−	Pts
Fiji	4	4	0	0	169	0	+169	12
Cook Islands	4	3	0	1	64	40	+24	10
New Caledonia	4	2	0	2	45	50	-5	8
Nauru	4	1	0	3	52	103	-51	6
Wallis and Futuna	4	0	0	4	34	124	-90	4

12 July 2019
9:28

Cook Islands	24-5	Nauru

St Joseph's Sports Field, Lotopa

12 July 2019
9:50

Fiji	51-0	Wallis and Futuna

St Joseph's Sports Field, Lotopa

12 July 2019
12:24

Fiji	47-0	New Caledonia

St Joseph's Sports Field, Lotopa

12 July 2019
12:46

Nauru	26-12	Wallis and Futuna

St Joseph's Sports Field, Lotopa

13 July 2019
15:44

New Caledonia	21-15	Wallis and Futuna

St Joseph's Sports Field, Lotopa

13 July 2019
16:06

Fiji	21-0	Cook Islands

St Joseph's Sports Field, Lotopa

13 July 2019
8:00

Cook Islands	26-7	Wallis and Futuna

St Joseph's Sports Field, Lotopa

13 July 2019
8:22

New Caledonia	17-21	Nauru

St Joseph's Sports Field, Lotopa

13 July 2019
10:56

Fiji	50-0	Nauru

St Joseph's Sports Field, Lotopa

13 July 2019
11:18

Cook Islands	14-7	New Caledonia

St Joseph's Sports Field, Lotopa

=== Pool B ===
Teams	Pld	W	D	L	PF	PA	+/−	Pts
Samoa	4	3	1	0	150	17	+133	11
Tonga	4	3	1	0	141	17	+124	11
Solomon Islands	4	2	0	2	74	78	-4	8
American Samoa	4	1	0	3	21	98	-77	6
Tuvalu	4	0	0	4	5	181	-176	4

12 July 2019
10:12

Tonga	42-0	Tuvalu

St Joseph's Sports Field, Lotopa

12 July 2019
10:34

Samoa	19-0	American Samoa

St Joseph's Sports Field, Lotopa

12 July 2019
13:08

Samoa	36-5	Solomon Islands

St Joseph's Sports Field, Lotopa

12 July 2019
13:30

Tuvalu	5-21	American Samoa

St Joseph's Sports Field, Lotopa

12 July 2019
16:28

Solomon Islands	29-0	American Samoa

St Joseph's Sports Field, Lotopa

12 July 2019
16:50

Samoa	12-12	Tonga

St Joseph's Sports Field, Lotopa

13 July 2019
8:44

Tonga	45-0	American Samoa

St Joseph's Sports Field, Lotopa

13 July 2019
9:06

Solomon Islands	35-0	Tuvalu

St Joseph's Sports Field, Lotopa

13 July 2019
11:40

Samoa	83-0	Tuvalu

St Joseph's Sports Field, Lotopa

13 July 2019
12:02

Tonga	42-5	Solomon Islands

St Joseph's Sports Field, Lotopa

== Medal playoffs ==
=== 9th-place play-off ===
13 July 2019
14:16

Wallis and Futuna	22-5	Tuvalu

St Joseph's Sports Field, Lotopa

=== 7th-place play-off ===
13 July 2019
14:38

New Caledonia	19-24	American Samoa

St Joseph's Sports Field, Lotopa

=== 5th-place play-off ===
13 July 2019
15:00

Nauru	12-27	Solomon Islands

St Joseph's Sports Field, Lotopa

=== Bronze medal match ===
13 July 2019
16:28

Cook Islands	10-19	Tonga

St Joseph's Sports Field, Lotopa

=== Gold medal match ===
13 July 2019
17:12

Fiji	7-5	Samoa

St Joseph's Sports Field, Lotopa

== See also ==
- Rugby sevens at the Pacific Games
- Rugby sevens at the 2019 Pacific Games – Women's tournament
