= Mata Utu =

Mata Utu Matāʻutu
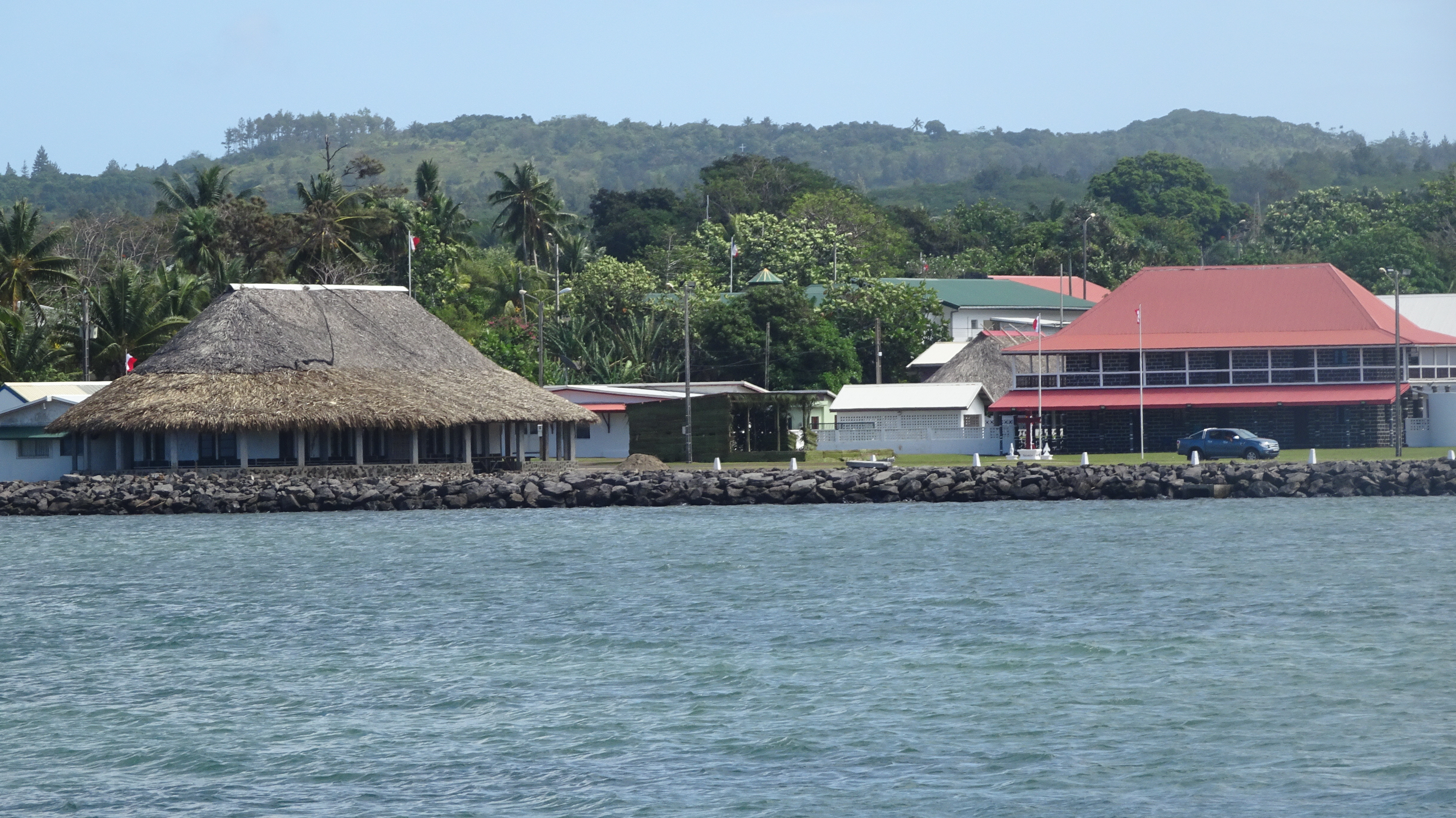
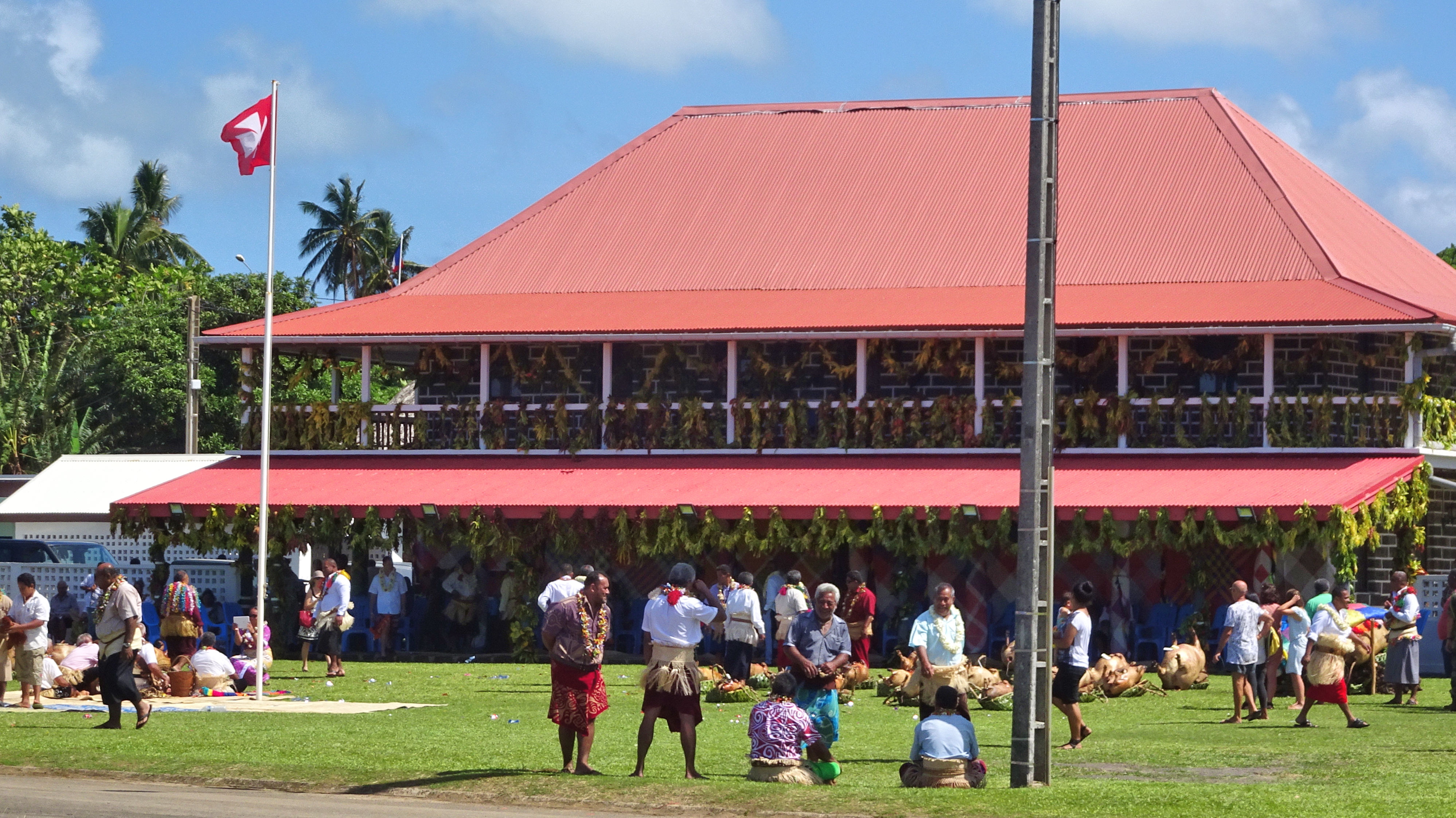
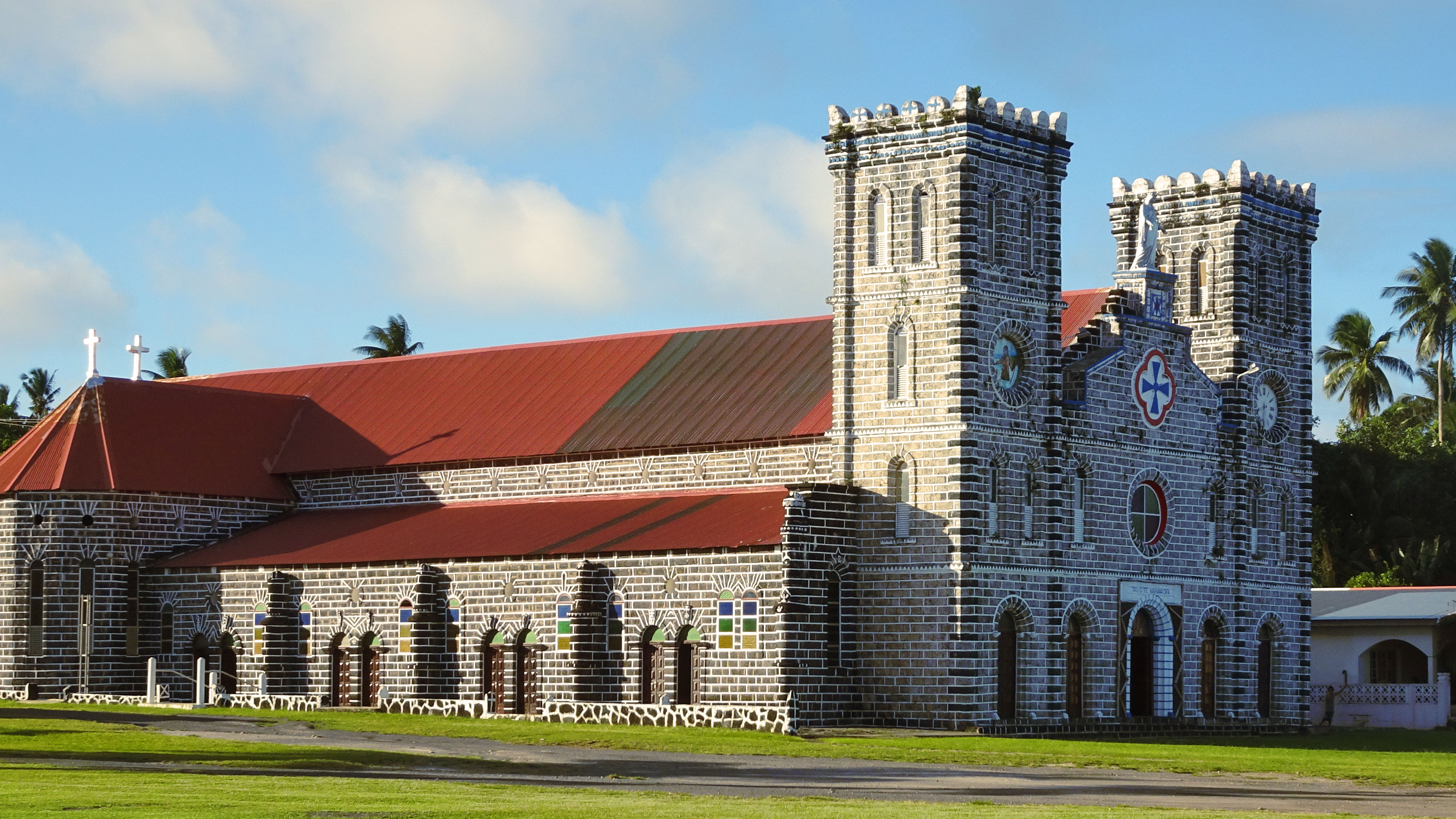
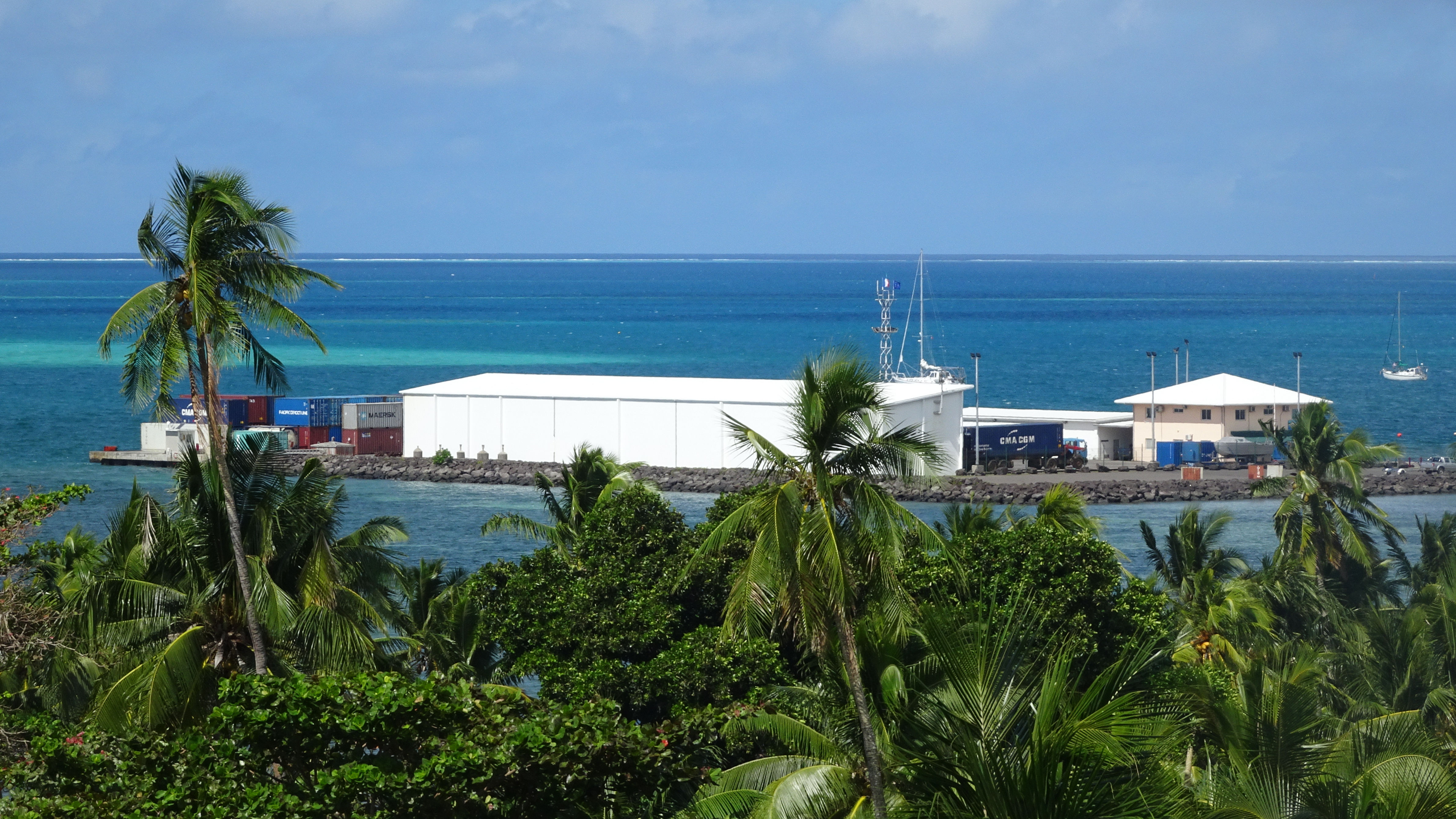
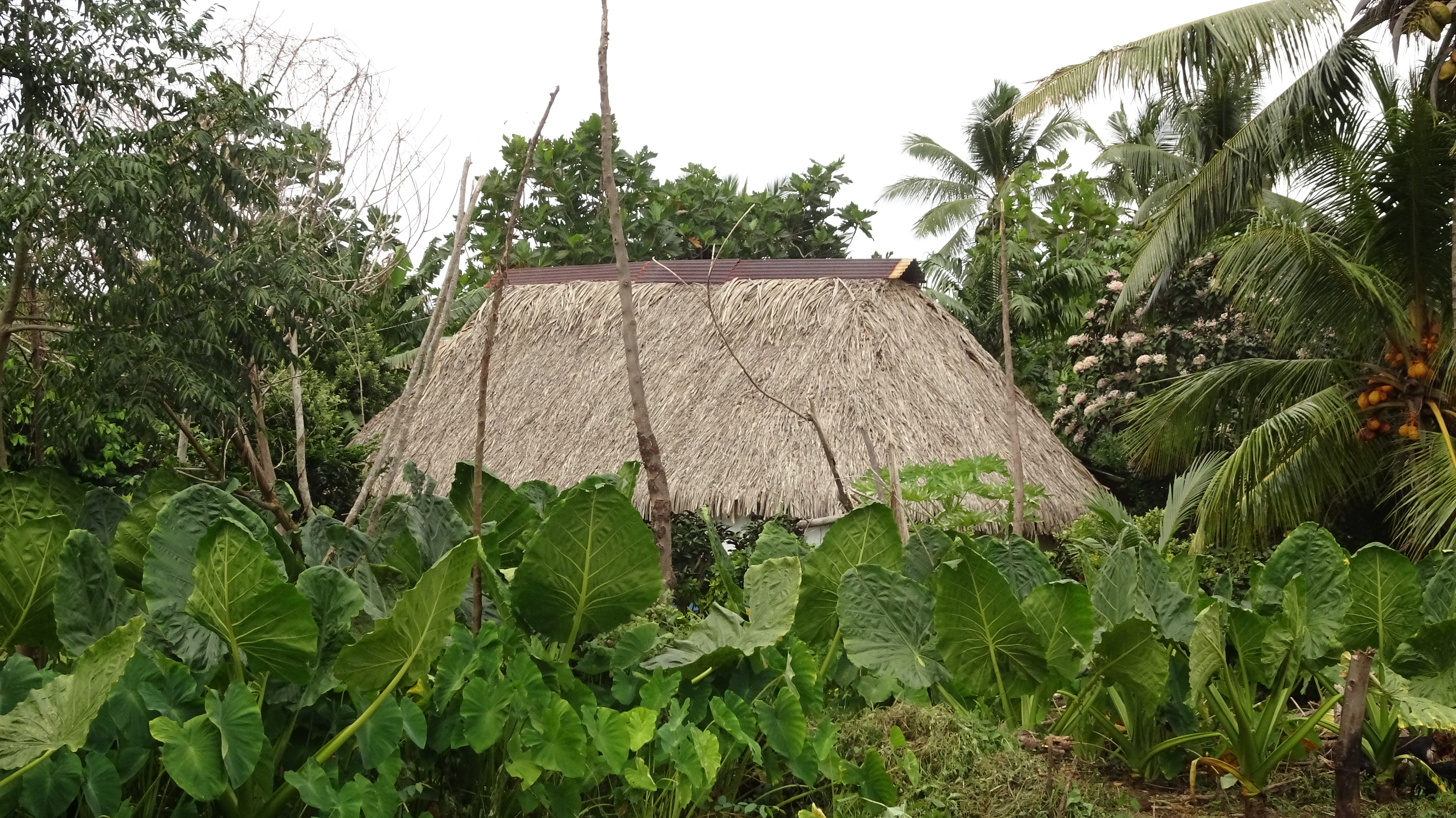
- Top: Mata Utu coastline; Middle: Uvea Royal Palace, Matâ'Utu Cathedral; Bottom: Mata Utu Harbor, Traditional house

- Flag

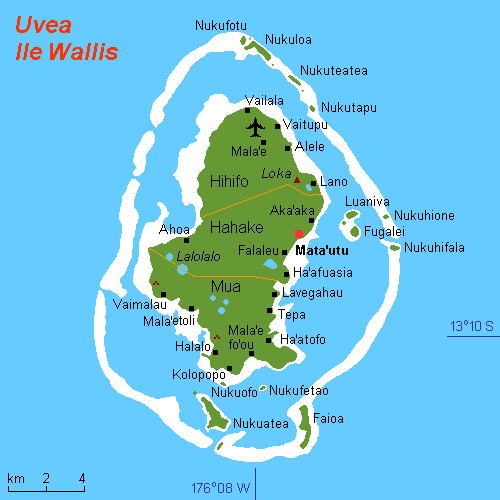
- Location of Mata-Utu
- Coordinates: 13°17′S 176°11′W
- Country: France
- Collectivity: Wallis and Futuna
- Island: Wallis
- Chiefdom: Uvea
- District: Hahake
- Capital of: Wallis and Futuna

Population (2018)
  - Total: 1,029

Mata Utu (French pronunciation: [mata utu]; Wallisian: Matāʻutu, [mataːʔutu]) is the capital city of Wallis and Futuna, an overseas collectivity of France. It is located on the island of Uvéa (ʻUvea), in the district of Hahake, of which it is also the capital. It is one of two ports in Wallis and Futuna, the other being at Leava on Futuna. Hihifo Airport, the main airport serving the island and city, is 5.6 kilometres (3.5 mi) to the northwest. Its population was 1,029 in 2018, up from 815 in 1998.

The most prominent landmarks in the town are the Matâ'Utu Cathedral, the palace next to it and backdrop of the Mt. Lulu Fakahega where there is an old chapel.

== History ==
In medieval times, Tuʻi Tonga invaders waged war against the islanders and took control. They installed the first chiefs, and called them the Uveas, which became the ruling dynasty of the two islands; they are based at Mata-Utu to this day. During recent archaeological excavations of the area, fortifications built by the Tongans (circa the Middle Ages) were unearthed, at nearby Talierumu and Malama Tagata.

Roman Catholic missionaries, who came to the island in 1837, ensured that the entire population of the islands was converted to Christianity, in a short period of five years. During this time, missionaries not only protected the islanders from the “highhandedness” of the Europeans, but also ensured that a number of churches were built; mainly at Mata-Utu, but also at Mu’a and Vaitupu islands.

In the 19th century, Mata-Utu was developed into a town from a small village, by the French (who installed most of Wallis & Futuna's major facilities). Historically, pigs, poultry, yams, bananas, and coconut were available to arriving boats. During World War II, the Free French sloop Chevreuil landed a detachment of French Marines at Mata-Utu. A small skirmish ensued, after which Vichy French dissidents were taken captive, and the island’s radio communications centre was overtaken. Francis Fox Parry of the 1st Battalion of the 11th Marines also landed here.

== Geography ==
Mata-Utu is the largest urban centre on Wallis Island, which lies between Tahiti and Nouméa. Uvea or Wallis island with Mata’Utu as its capital has an area of 60 km^{2} and is part of the larger Wallis archipelago. It is surrounded by coral reefs. Mata’Utu is the administrative headquarters and business capital of the Wallis islands. It is located on the eastern coast, along the main coast road RT1. The north-south RT1 and RT3, coming from the west, intersect in the town centre. Mata-Utu is one of two ports in Wallis and Futuna, the other being at Leava. There are several small islets in the lagoon offshore beyond Mata-Utu Bay (Baie de Mata'utu), including Luaniva, Fugalei, Nukuhione, and Nukuhifala; the islets are a good place for ships to anchor as the shore at Mata-Utu Bay is not adequate for this purpose. Mata Utu Bay lies about 3 miles (5 km) to the northeast of Mua Bay.

== Climate ==
Climate data for MATA-UTU, WALLIS AND FUTUNA
Month	Jan	Feb	Mar	Apr	May	Jun	Jul	Aug	Sep	Oct	Nov	Dec	Year
Mean daily maximum °C (°F)	30.3 (86.5)	30.4 (86.7)	30.3 (86.5)	30.3 (86.5)	29.7 (85.5)	29.4 (84.9)	28.9 (84.0)	29.1 (84.4)	29.3 (84.7)	29.5 (85.1)	29.9 (85.8)	30.3 (86.5)	29.8 (85.6)
Daily mean °C (°F)	27.4 (81.3)	27.5 (81.5)	27.4 (81.3)	27.4 (81.3)	27.0 (80.6)	26.9 (80.4)	26.5 (79.7)	26.6 (79.9)	26.8 (80.2)	26.9 (80.4)	27.1 (80.8)	27.4 (81.3)	27.1 (80.7)
Mean daily minimum °C (°F)	24.4 (75.9)	24.5 (76.1)	24.5 (76.1)	24.4 (75.9)	24.3 (75.7)	24.4 (75.9)	24.0 (75.2)	24.1 (75.4)	24.2 (75.6)	24.2 (75.6)	24.3 (75.7)	24.4 (75.9)	24.3 (75.8)
Average precipitation mm (inches)	381.4 (15.02)	301.3 (11.86)	373.5 (14.70)	287.6 (11.32)	258.4 (10.17)	159.3 (6.27)	186.5 (7.34)	149.9 (5.90)	221.1 (8.70)	330.4 (13.01)	322.9 (12.71)	350.3 (13.79)	3,322.6 (130.79)
Average rainy days	20	19	19	16	16	14	14	14	14	19	17	19	201
Source: Weatherbase

== Cityscape ==
Downtown Mata-Utu is dominated by the Matâ'Utu Cathedral, a French national monument, which bears the royal insignia of Wallis, a Maltese cross between its towers. The cathedral is also known as "Our Lady of Good Hope Cathedral", which overlooks the lagoon. Within its vicinity there are, as well as several restaurants, the Au Bon Marche and Oceania market, hotels and the post office, and the simple Palace of the King of Uvéa, which features two-storey verandas adjoining the church.

There is also a platform known locally as Fale Fono on the opposite side of the wharf which was used by the chief of the local tribes to address people. The hill known as the Mt. Lulu Fakahega, which rises to a height of 145 m, forms the backdrop of the village. It has an old chapel at the top. This site is accessed by a short and narrow road and the view from the top of the hill is particularly scenic.

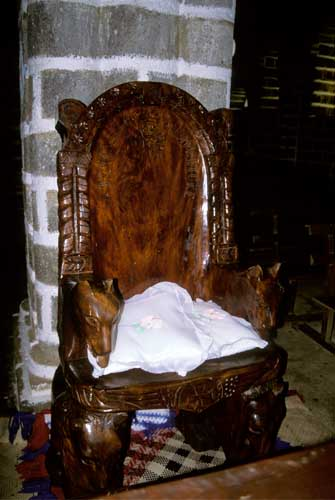
Throne in Palace of the King of Uvéa,

The town contains the rugby stadium Stade Laione Rugby, Stade Lomipeau, Stade de Kafika in the western suburbs and Sia Hospital. There are no street names in Mata-Utu. Telephone facilities, banking facilities and other essential services are all available in the town.

== Economy ==
The economy of the island is dependent on its chief produce of copra, cassava, yams, taro roots, and bananas. Livestock consists of 25,000 pigs and 7,000 goats. The unit of currency is the CFP franc. The balance of imports is not favorable to the islands as imports exceed exports.

== Services ==
The magistrate's court of Wallis and Futuna is located in Mata-Utu. Radio Wallis et Futuna is broadcast from Mata-Utu. A short distance out of town are the police station and shopping mall. There is also a branch of the Indosuez Bank in Mata-Utu, and a thermal power station. The Uvéa Shop sells cassettes of the music of the Wallisian singer and composer Palisio Tuauli of the band Talamohe. The town lacks a tourist information center.

A cargo shipping service connects to Mata’Utu on Wallis and Leava on Futuna with Nouméa. As of 1995, there were eight cargo vessels with a total capacity of 146128 DWT. The Hihifo Airport serves Mata’Utu and Wallis Island is 6 km (4 mi) northwest of the town.

== Culture ==
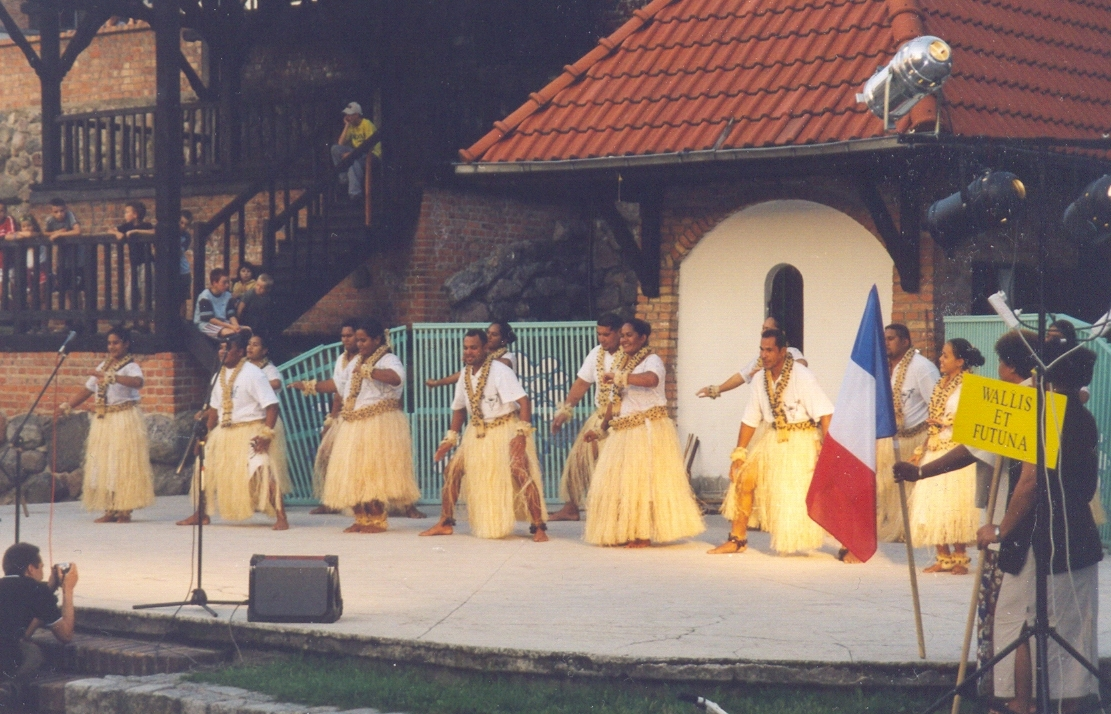
Dancers from Wallis and Futuna performing the 'Plantation'

The cultural identity of the Wallis's islanders is Wallisian, an offshoot of Polynesian culture. The language spoken in the town and on the island is 'Uvean, a derivative of Western Polynesian with close affinity to Tongan. In Wallis island, Wallisians use 'Uvean as their everyday language, while French is the language of the administration.

Assumption Day is celebrated in Mata-Utu on August 15.

Near Mata-Utu are two important archaeological sites, Talietumu and Tonga Toto.

Uvea Museum Association, in the shopping centre, is a military history museum that records the Second World War history of the territory.
