= Rugby sevens at the 2015 Pacific Games – Men's tournament =

Rugby sevens – Men's tournament at the 2015 Pacific Games
- Venue: Sir John Guise Stadium
- Location: Port Moresby, Papua New Guinea
- Dates: 8–10 July 2015
- Nations: 10

Medalists
gold medal	Fiji
silver medal	Samoa
bronze medal	Tonga

The Men's rugby sevens tournament at the 2015 Pacific Games was held in Port Moresby from 8 to 10 July 2015 at the Sir John Guise Outdoor Stadium. Fiji won the gold medal defeating Samoa by 33–7 in the final. Tonga took the bronze medal defeating hosts PNG 19–12 in the third place match.

== Participants ==
Ten teams played in the tournament:

- Fiji
- Guam
- Nauru
- New Caledonia
- Papua New Guinea
- Samoa
- Solomon Islands
- Tahiti
- Tonga
- Vanuatu

== Format ==
The teams were split into two pools of five, with a round-robin played in each pool. This was followed by a knockout stage which included the medal play-offs.

== Pool A ==
Teams	Pld	W	D	L	PF	PA	+/−	Pts
Fiji	4	4	0	0	185	0	+185	12
Papua New Guinea	4	3	0	1	99	36	+63	10
Solomon Islands	4	2	0	2	40	93	–53	8
Tahiti	4	1	0	3	41	86	–45	6
Guam	4	0	0	4	12	162	–150	4
Updated: 11 July 2015 Source: • Teams ranked 1 to 4 (Green background) advanced to the Quarterfinals. • The team ranked 5 (Blue background) advanced to the Ninth place play-off.

8 July 2015
13:28

Fiji	17–0	Papua New Guinea

Sir John Guise Stadium, Port Moresby

8 July 2015
13:50

Solomon Islands	12–0	Tahiti

Sir John Guise Stadium, Port Moresby

8 July 2015
16:46

Fiji	59–0	Guam

Sir John Guise Stadium, Port Moresby

8 July 2015
17:08

Papua New Guinea	24–12	Tahiti

Sir John Guise Stadium, Port Moresby

8 July 2015
20:04

Fiji	59–0	Solomon Islands

Sir John Guise Stadium, Port Moresby

8 July 2015
20:26

Guam	0–53	Papua New Guinea

Sir John Guise Stadium, Port Moresby

9 July 2015
14:20

Fiji	50–0	Tahiti

Sir John Guise Stadium, Port Moresby

9 July 2015
14:56

Guam	12–21	Solomon Islands

Sir John Guise Stadium, Port Moresby

9 July 2015
17:52

Papua New Guinea	22–7	Solomon Islands

Sir John Guise Stadium, Port Moresby

9 July 2015
18:14

Guam	0–29	Tahiti

Sir John Guise Stadium, Port Moresby

== Pool B ==
Teams	Pld	W	D	L	PF	PA	+/−	Pts
Samoa	4	4	0	0	185	12	+173	12
Tonga	4	3	0	1	134	59	+75	10
New Caledonia	4	2	0	2	81	58	+23	8
Vanuatu	4	1	0	3	61	112	–51	6
Nauru	4	0	0	4	7	227	–220	4
Updated: 11 July 2015 Source: • Teams ranked 1 to 4 (Green background) advanced to the Quarterfinals. • The team ranked 5 (Blue background) advanced to the Ninth place play-off.

8 July 2015
14:12

Samoa	45–5	Tonga

Sir John Guise Stadium, Port Moresby

8 July 2015
14:34

New Caledonia	17–7	Vanuatu

Sir John Guise Stadium, Port Moresby

8 July 2015
17:30

Nauru	0–71	Samoa

Sir John Guise Stadium, Port Moresby

8 July 2015
17:52

New Caledonia	7–27	Tonga

Sir John Guise Stadium, Port Moresby

9 July 2015
12:00

Samoa	45–0	Vanuatu

Sir John Guise Stadium, Port Moresby

9 July 2015
12:20

Nauru	0–59	Tonga

Sir John Guise Stadium, Port Moresby

9 July 2015
15:18

New Caledonia	7–24	Samoa

Sir John Guise Stadium, Port Moresby

9 July 2015
15:40

Nauru	7–47	Vanuatu

Sir John Guise Stadium, Port Moresby

9 July 2015
18:36

Tonga	43–7	Vanuatu

Sir John Guise Stadium, Port Moresby

9 July 2015
18:58

Nauru	0–50	New Caledonia

Sir John Guise Stadium, Port Moresby

== Knockout stage ==
=== Championship bracket ===
Quarter-finals
10 July – 13:06
Fiji	54
Vanuatu	5
10 July – 13:28
New Caledonia	0
Papua New Guinea	17
10 July – 13:50
Tonga	19
Solomon Islands	12
10 July – 14:12
Tahiti	0
Samoa	48

Semi-finals
10 July – 15:40
Fiji	24
Papua New Guinea	5
10 July – 16;02
Tonga	5
Samoa	35

Final
10 July – 19:49
Fiji	33
Samoa	7
Third place
10 July – 19:27
Papua New Guinea	12
Tonga	19

==== Quarterfinals ====
10 July 2015
13:06

Fiji	54–5	Vanuatu

Sir John Guise Stadium, Port Moresby

10 July 2015
13:28

Papua New Guinea	17–0	New Caledonia

Sir John Guise Stadium, Port Moresby

10 July 2015
13:50

Tonga	19–12	Solomon Islands

Sir John Guise Stadium, Port Moresby

10 July 2015
14:12

Samoa	48–0	Tahiti

Sir John Guise Stadium, Port Moresby

==== Semifinals ====
10 July 2015
15:40

Fiji	24–5	Papua New Guinea

Sir John Guise Stadium, Port Moresby

10 July 2015
16:02

Samoa	35–5	Tonga

Sir John Guise Stadium, Port Moresby

==== Bronze medal game ====
10 July 2015
19:27

Papua New Guinea	12–19	Tonga
	Report

Sir John Guise Stadium, Port Moresby

==== Gold medal game ====
10 July 2015
19:49

Fiji	33–7	Samoa
	Report

Sir John Guise Stadium, Port Moresby

=== Middle bracket ===
5th–8th semifinals
10 July – 14:56
New Caledonia	21
Vanuatu	5
10 July – 15:18
Tahiti	14
Solomon Islands	15

Fifth place
10 July – 17:52
Solomon Islands	0
New Caledonia	24
Seventh place
10 July – 17:30
Vanuatu	10
Tahiti	21

==== 5th–8th semifinals ====
10 July 2015
14:56

New Caledonia	21–5	Vanuatu

Sir John Guise Stadium, Port Moresby

10 July 2015
15:18

Tahiti	14–15	Solomon Islands

Sir John Guise Stadium, Port Moresby

==== Seventh place game ====
10 July 2015
17:30

Vanuatu	10–21	Tahiti

Sir John Guise Stadium, Port Moresby

==== Fifth place game ====
10 July 2015
17:52

Solomon Islands	0–24	New Caledonia

Sir John Guise Stadium, Port Moresby

=== Lower bracket ===
Ninth place
Guam	31
Nauru	0

==== Ninth place game ====
10 July 2015
17:08

Guam	31–0	Nauru

Sir John Guise Stadium, Port Moresby

== See also ==
- Rugby sevens at the 2015 Pacific Games – Women's tournament
- Rugby sevens at the Pacific Games
- Pacific Games
