= 2022–23 World Rugby Sevens Series squads =

International rugby sevens

Sevens 2022–23 squads

This is a list of the complete squads for the 2022–23 World Rugby Sevens Series.

Legend
Gold	Indicates the captains for a tournament
–	Indicates that a player did not play in the tournament

== Argentina ==
Head Coach: (Argentina) Santiago Gómez Cora

Argentina team members 2022–23
Player	Jersey number by tournament										
Player	Hong Kong I	Dubai	Cape Town	Hamilton	Sydney	Los Angeles	Vancouver	Hong Kong II	Singapore	Toulouse	London
Benjamín Elizalde	22	–	–	–	–	–	–	–	–	–	–
Agustín Fraga	5	5	5	5	5	5	5	5	5	5	5
Luciano González	11	11	–	11	11	11	11	11	11	11	11
Rodrigo Isgró	1	1	1	1	1	1	1	1	1	1	1
Alejo Lavayén	7	7	7	7	7	7	–	7	–	7	7
Tomás Lizazú	12	–	–	–	–	–	–	12	12	12	–
Marcos Moneta	13	13	–	13	13	13	13	13	13	13	13
Agustín Moyano	16	–	–	–	–	–	–	–	–	–	–
Matías Osadczuk	9	9	9	9	–	9	9	9	9	–	–
Joaquín Pellandini	14	14	14	14	14	14	14	14	14	14	14
Gastón Revol	8	8	–	8	8	8	8	8	8	8	8
Franco Rossetto	15	15	15	–	–	–	15	–	–	–	–
Santiago Vera Feld	2	2	2	2	2	2	–	2	2	2	2
Tobías Wade	10	10	10	10	10	10	10	–	–	10	10
Matteo Graziano	–	21	21	21	21	21	21	21	21	21	21
Juan Manuel Molinuevo	–	23	23	–	–	–	–	–	–	–	–
Germán Schulz	–	3	3	3	3	3	3	3	3	3	3
Simón Benitez Cruz	–	–	19	–	–	–	–	–	–	–	–
Fernando Luna	–	–	90	–	–	–	–	–	–	–	–
Santiago Álvarez	–	–	–	6	6	6	6	6	6	6	6
Tomás Elizalde	–	–	–	–	–	–	17	17	17	17	17
Alfonso Latorre	–	–	–	–	–	–	18	–	–	–	–

== Australia ==
Head Coach: (Australia) John Manenti

Australia team members 2022–23
Player	Jersey number by tournament										
Player	Hong Kong I	Dubai	Cape Town	Hamilton	Sydney	Los Angeles	Vancouver	Hong Kong II	Singapore	Toulouse	London
Tim Clements	5	5	5	5	5	5	5	5	5	5	5
Stuart Dunbar	2	2	2	2	2	2	2	–	–	–	–
Henry Hutchison	1	1	1	1	1	–	–	–	–	–	–
Darby Lancaster	23	–	–	–	23	23	23	23	23	23	–
Nathan Lawson	12	12	12	12	12	12	12	12	12	12	12
Maurice Longbottom	11	11	11	11	11	11	11	11	11	11	11
Nick Malouf	10	10	–	–	–	–	–	10	10	10	10
Ben Marr	15	15	15	15	15	–	–	15	15	–	–
Kyle Oates	24	24	–	–	–	–	–	–	–	24	24
Henry Paterson	6	6	6	6	6	6	6	6	6	6	6
Dietrich Roache	4	4	4	4	4	4	4	4	4	4	4
James Turner	14	–	–	14	14	14	–	–	–	14	14
Josh Turner	7	7	7	7	7	7	7	7	7	7	7
Matt Gonzalez	–	9	9	–	–	9	9	9	9	9	9
Jordan–Lee Bacon	–	3	3	–	–	–	–	–	–	–	–
Dally Bird	–	–	8	8	8	8	8	8	8	8	8
Trae Williams	–	–	22	22	–	22	22	–	–	–	22
Simon Kennewell	–	–	–	13	13	–	–	–	–	–	–
Hayden Sargeant	–	–	–	–	–	25	25	25	25	25	25
Jordan Williams	–	–	–	–	–	–	21	–	–	–	–
Max Burey	–	–	–	–	–	–	–	30	30	–	–

== Canada ==
Head Coach: (New Zealand) Henry Paul

Canada team members 2022–23
Player	Jersey number by tournament										
Player	Hong Kong I	Dubai	Cape Town	Hamilton	Sydney	Los Angeles	Vancouver	Hong Kong II	Singapore	Toulouse	London
Phil Berna	4	4	4	4	4	4	4	4	4	4	4
D'Shawn Bowen	3	3	3	3	3	–	–	–	–	–	–
Elias Ergas	11	–	11	11	–	11	11	–	–	–	11
Thomas Isherwood	23	23	23	23	23	23	23	23	23	23	23
Lachlan Kratz	13	–	–	–	–	–	13	–	13	13	13
Josiah Morra	6	6	6	6	6	6	6	6	6	6	6
Anton Ngongo	1	1	1	1	1	–	–	1	1	1	1
Matthew Oworu	19	19	19	19	19	19	19	19	19	19	19
David Richard	12	12	12	–	–	–	–	12	12	12	12
Alex Russell	5	5	5	–	–	5	5	5	5	5	5
Kal Sager	33	33	33	33	33	33	33	33	33	33	33
Jake Thiel	2	2	2	2	2	2	2	–	–	–	–
Brock Webster	7	7	7	7	7	–	–	–	–	7	7
Cooper Coats	–	8	–	–	–	–	–	–	–	–	–
Lockie Kratz	–	44	44	–	–	44	–	44	–	–	–
Dawson Fatoric	–	–	–	27	27	–	–	–	–	–	–
Elias Hancock	–	–	–	64	64	64	64	64	64	64	–
Josh Thiel	–	–	–	14	14	14	14	–	–	–	–
Jarvis Dashkewytch	–	–	–	–	22	–	–	–	–	–	–
Jack Carson	–	–	–	–	–	99	99	–	–	99	99
Matt Percillier	–	–	–	–	–	88	88	–	–	–	–
Will Percillier	–	–	–	–	–	–	–	77	77	–	
Brenning Prevost	–	–	–	–	–	–	–	10	10	–	–
Max Stewart	–	–	–	–	–	–	–	21	21	21	21

== Fiji ==
Head Coach: (England) Ben Gollings

Fiji team members 2022–23
Player	Jersey number by tournament										
Player	Hong Kong I	Dubai	Cape Town	Hamilton	Sydney	Los Angeles	Vancouver	Hong Kong II	Singapore	Toulouse	London
Pilipo Bukayaro	9	9	9	9	9	9	9	9	9	–	–
Josevani Drava	6	–	–	6	6	–	–	–	–	–	–
Manueli Maisamoa	11	11	11	11	11	11	11	11	11	11	11
Jerry Matana	3	3	3	3	3	3	3	–	–	–	–
Sevuloni Mocenacagi	4	4	4	4	4	–	–	4	4	4	4
Waisea Nacuqu	8	8	8	8	8	8	8	8	8	8	8
Vuiviawa Naduvalo	12	12	12	12	12	–	–	12	12	12	12
Paula Nayacakalou	13	13	13	–	–	–	–	–	–	13	13
Tira Patterson	5	5	5	5	–	–	–	–	–	–	–
Filipe Sauturaga	7	7	7	7	–	–	–	–	–	7	7
Joseva Talacolo	2	2	2	–	–	–	–	2	2	2	2
Iowane Teba	10	–	–	10	10	10	10	10	10	10	–
Josua Vakurunabili	1	1	1	1	1	1	1	–	–	–	–
Alasio Naduva	–	35	35	–	35	–	–	–	–	–	–
Iowane Raturaciri	–	14	14	–	–	–	–	–	–	–	–
Josese Batirerega	–	–	–	99	99	99	99	99	99	99	99
Jerry Tuwai	–	–	–	30	30	30	30	–	–	30	30
Tevita Daugunu	–	–	–	–	82	82	82	82	82	–	–
Ponepati Loganimasi	–	–	–	–	–	18	18	18	18	18	18
Anasa Qaranivalu	–	–	–	–	–	16	16	–	–	–	–
Rokoua Rasaku	–	–	–	–	–	24	24	–	–	–	–
Rauto Vakadranu	–	–	–	–	–	15	15	–	–	–	–
Napolioni Bolaca	–	–	–	–	–	–	–	88	88	–	
Terio Veilawa	–	–	–	–	–	–	–	94	94	94	94
Suliano Volivolituevei	–	–	–	–	–	–	–	20	20	20	20
Josese Batirerega	–	–	–	–	–	–	–	–	–	99	99

== France ==
Head Coach: (France) Jérôme Daret

France team members 2022–23
Player	Jersey number by tournament										
Player	Hong Kong I	Dubai	Cape Town	Hamilton	Sydney	Los Angeles	Vancouver	Hong Kong II	Singapore	Toulouse	London
Thomas Carol	21	21	21	21	21	21	21	21	–	–	21
Marius Domon	55	55	55	–	–	–	–	–	–	–	–
Theo Forner	20	20	–	20	20	20	20	20	–	20	–
Aaron Grandidier-Nkanang	9	9	9	9	–	–	–	–	–	9	9
Jefferson-Lee Joseph	14	14	14	–	–	14	14	14	14	–	14
Dorian Laborde	40	40	–	40	40	–	–	–	–	–	–
Jonathan Laugel	1	1	1	1	1	1	1	1	1	1	1
Paul Leraitre	92	–	92	–	–	92	92	92	92	92	92
Pierre Mignot	13	–	–	–	–	–	–	–	–	–	–
Stephen Parez	5	5	5	5	5	5	5	5	5	5	5
Varian Pasquet	19	19	19	19	19	19	19	19	19	19	19
Rayan Rebbadj	26	26	26	26	26	–	–	–	26	26	26
Joris Simon	96	96	–	–	–	96	96	–	96	–	96
Nisié Huyard	–	23	23	23	23	–	–	–	–	–	–
William Iraguha	–	91	91	91	91	91	91	91	91	91	91
Pierre Lucas	–	–	15	–	–	–	–	–	–	–	–
Paulin Riva	–	–	6	6	6	6	6	6	6	6	6
Nelson Épée	–	–	–	7	7	–	–	–	–	–	–
Antoine Zeghdar	–	–	–	8	8	–	–	–	–	–	–
Jordan Sepho	–	–	–	–	12	12	–	12	12	12	12
Jean-Pascal Barraque	–	–	–	–	–	10	10	10	10	–	–
Andy Timo	–	–	–	–	–	88	88	–	–	88	–
Enzo Salles	–	–	–	–	–	–	30	–	–	–	–
Esteban Capilla	–	–	–	–	–	–	–	27	–	–	–
Thibaud Mazzolen	–	–	–	–	–	–	–	25	25	25	–
Joachim Trouabal	–	–	–	–	–	–	–	–	11	11	11

== Great Britain ==
Head Coach: (England) Tony Roques

Great Britain team members 2022–23
Player	Jersey number by tournament										
Player	Hong Kong I	Dubai	Cape Town	Hamilton	Sydney	Los Angeles	Vancouver	Hong Kong II	Singapore	Toulouse	London
Jamie Barden	33	33	33	33	33	33	33	33	33	–	33
Kaleem Barreto	4	4	4	4	4	4	4	4	4	4	4
Alec Coombes	20	–	–	–	–	–	–	–	–	–	–
Tom Emery	15	15	15	15	15	15	15	–	–	–	–
Jamie Farndale	7	–	–	–	–	–	–	–	–	7	–
Robbie Fergusson	10	10	10	10	10	10	10	10	10	–	10
Will Homer	12	–	–	12	12	12	12	12	12	12	12
Paddy Kelly	6	6	6	–	6	–	–	6	6	6	6
Ross McCann	5	5	5	5	–	5	5	5	5	5	5
Max McFarland	30	30	30	–	30	30	30	30	30	–	–
Freddie Roddick	8	8	8	8	8	8	8	8	8	8	8
Oluemi Sofolarin	13	13	13	13	13	–	–	13	13	13	13
Morgan Williams	9	9	9	9	9	9	–	9	9	–	–
Toby Baldwin	–	77	77	–	–	–	–	–	–	–	–
Api Bavadra	–	23	23	23	23	23	23	23	23	23	23
Marcus Kershaw	–	26	26	–	–	–	–	–	–	–	–
Alex Davis	–	–	–	3	3	3	3	–	–	–	–
Tom Williams	–	–	–	2	2	–	2	2	2	–	–
Ethan Waddleton	–	–	–	11	–	11	11	11	11	11	11
Nathan Greenwood	–	–	–	–	–	14	14	–	–	14	14
Jamie Adamson	–	–	–	–	–	–	–	–	–	1	1
Matt Davidson	–	–	–	–	–	–	–	–	–	99	99
Harri Williams	–	–	–	–	–	–	–	–	–	17	–

== Ireland ==
Head Coach: (Northern Ireland) James Topping

Ireland team members 2022–23
Player	Jersey number by tournament										
Player	Hong Kong I	Dubai	Cape Town	Hamilton	Sydney	Los Angeles	Vancouver	Hong Kong II	Singapore	Toulouse	London
Sean Cribbin	11	11	11	–	–	–	–	11	11	11	11
Niall Comerford	12	12	12	12	12	12	12	–	12	12	12
Jordan Conroy	7	7	7	7	7	7	7	7	7	7	–
Billy Dardis	6	–	–	6	6	6	6	–	–	6	6
Ed Kelly	14	14	14	14	14	–	–	–	–	–	–
Jack Kelly	1	1	1	1	1	1	1	1	–	1	–
Hugo Lennox	9	9	9	–	–	9	9	9	9	–	9
Harry McNulty	3	3	3	3	3	3	3	3	3	3	3
Dylan O'Grady	30	–	–	–	–	30	30	30	30	–	30
Aaron O'Sullivan	15	15	15	15	15	15	–	–	–	–	–
Mark Roche	21	21	21	21	21	21	21	21	21	21	–
Tom Roche	44	–	–	–	–	–	44	44	44	–	–
Zac Ward	24	24	24	–	–	–	24	–	–	24	24
Sean Galvin	–	88	–	–	–	–	–	–	–	88	88
Bryan Mollen	–	13	13	13	13	13	13	–	–	13	13
Andrew Smith	–	23	23	23	23	23	23	23	23	23	–
Will Goddard	–	–	77	–	77	–	–	–	–	–	–
Terry Kennedy	–	–	–	10	10	–	–	–	–	–	–
Liam McNamara	–	–	–	18	18	18	–	18	18	18	–
Chay Mullins	–	–	–	31	–	–	–	31	31	–	31
Matthew McDonald	–	–	–	–	–	27	27	27	27	–	27
Fergus Jemphrey	–	–	–	–	–	–	–	8	8	–	–
Connor O'Sullivan	–	–	–	–	–	–	–	–	–	2	2
Gavin Mullin	–	–	–	–	–	–	–	–	–	–	99

== Japan ==
Head Coach: (England) Simon Amor

Japan team members 2022–23
Player	Jersey number by tournament										
Player	Hong Kong I	Dubai	Cape Town	Hamilton	Sydney	Los Angeles	Vancouver	Hong Kong II	Singapore	Toulouse	London
Moeki Fukushi	6	6	6	6	6	–	6	6	6	6	–
Taisei Hayashi	9	9	9	9	9	9	9	9	9	9	9
Yuu Kurihara	14	14	–	–	14	–	–	–	14	–	–
Kameli Soejima	5	5	5	5	5	5	5	5	5	–	–
Takamasa Maruo	10	10	10	–	–	10	10	10	10	10	10
Ren Miyagami	12	12	12	–	12	12	–	–	12	12	12
Chikara Morita	13	13	13	–	–	–	–	–	–	–	–
Kazuma Nakagawa	2	–	–	2	2	–	–	–	–	–	–
Yoshihiro Noguchi	8	–	8	8	8	8	8	8	8	8	8
Shun Tomonaga	15	15	–	–	–	–	–	–	–	–	–
Shotaro Tsuoka	11	–	–	11	11	–	–	–	–	11	11
Koki Yakushiji	1	1	1	–	–	1	1	1	1	1	1
Taichi Yoshizawa	3	–	–	–	–	–	–	–	–	3	3
Yuki Ishii	–	16	16	–	–	–	–	–	–	–	–
Yoshiyuki Koga	–	4	4	4	4	4	4	4	4	–	–
Yu Okudaira	–	17	17	17	–	–	17	17	17	17	17
Taiyo Sugino	–	19	19	–	–	19	–	–	–	–	–
Toru Kanazawa	–	–	21	–	–	–	–	–	–	–	–
Taiga Ishida	–	–	–	18	18	–	18	18	18	18	18
Junya Matsumoto	–	–	–	23	23	23	23	23	23	23	23
Yotu Nakamura	–	–	–	22	22	–	–	–	–	–	–
Ren Ouchi	–	–	–	24	–	–	–	–	–	–	–
Kazuma Ueda	–	–	–	25	25	–	–	–	–	–	–
Kippei Ishida	–	–	–	–	–	26	26	26	–	26	26
Soji Iwamoto	–	–	–	–	–	28	–	–	–	–	–
Josua Kerevi	–	–	–	–	–	20	20	20	–	–	–
Kippei Taninaka	–	–	–	–	–	27	27	27	27	27	27
Timo Fiti Sufia	–	–	–	–	–	–	–	–	–	–	29

== Kenya ==
Head Coach: (England) Damian McGrath

Kenya team members 2022–23
Player	Jersey number by tournament										
Player	Hong Kong I	Dubai	Cape Town	Hamilton	Sydney	Los Angeles	Vancouver	Hong Kong II	Singapore	Toulouse	London
Dennis Abukuse	13	13	13	13	13	13	13	–	–	13	13
Willy Ambaka	12	12	12	12	12	–	–	–	–	–	–
Edmund Anya	11	11	11	11	11	11	11	11	11	11	11
Herman Humwa	8	8	8	8	8	8	8	8	8	8	8
Bush Mwale	2	–	–	–	–	–	–	–	–	–	–
Billy Odhiambo	5	5	5	–	–	5	5	5	5	5	5
Johnstone Olindi	10	10	10	–	–	–	–	10	10	10	10
Tony Omondi	7	7	7	7	7	7	7	7	7	–	7
Vincent Onyala	4	–	–	–	–	–	–	–	–	–	–
George Ooro	3	3	3	3	3	3	3	3	3	3	–
Nelson Oyoo	9	9	9	9	9	9	9	9	9	9	9
Daniel Taabu	1	1	1	–	–	1	1	1	1	1	1
Kevin Wakesa	6	6	6	6	6	6	6	6	6	6	6
Bob Muhati	–	99	99	–	–	–	–	–	–	–	–
Ronaldo Omondi	–	14	14	14	14	–	–	–	–	–	–
John Okeyo	–	–	–	22	22	22	22	22	22	22	22
Alvin Otieno	–	–	–	32	32	32	32	32	32	32	32
Brian Tanga	–	–	–	21	21	21	21	21	21	21	21
Floyd Wabwire	–	–	–	20	20	–	–	–	–	–	–
Brunson Madigu	–	–	–	–	–	23	23	–	–	–	–
Jeff Oluoch	–	–	–	–	–	–	–	24	24	24	24

== New Zealand ==
Head Coach: (Scotland) Clark Laidlaw (All events except for Dubai), (Fiji) Tomasi Cama (Dubai only)

New Zealand team members 2022–23
Player	Jersey number by tournament										
Player	Hong Kong I	Dubai	Cape Town	Hamilton	Sydney	Los Angeles	Vancouver	Hong Kong II	Singapore	Toulouse	London
Kurt Baker	10	10	–	–	–	–	–	–	–	–	–
Leroy Carter	12	12	–	12	12	12	12	12	12	12	12
Dylan Collier	5	–	–	5	5	5	5	5	5	5	5
Sam Dickson	7	7	7	7	7	7	7	–	–	7	7
Moses Leo	13	13	13	13	–	13	13	–	13	13	–
Ngarohi McGarvey-Black	6	–	–	6	6	6	6	6	–	–	6
Sione Molia	27	–	–	27	27	–	–	27	27	27	27
Tone Ng Shiu	3	3	3	–	–	–	–	–	–	–	–
Amanaki Nicole	9	9	9	9	9	9	9	9	9	–	–
Akuila Rokolisoa	4	4	4	4	4	4	4	4	4	4	4
Brady Rush	2	2	2	2	2	2	2	2	2	2	2
Regan Ware	64	64	64	64	–	–	–	–	64	64	64
Joe Webber	11	11	11	11	11	11	11	–	–	–	–
Che Clark	–	21	21	21	21	–	–	–	–	21	21
Lewis Ormond	–	23	23	–	23	23	23	23	23	–	–
Caleb Tangitau	–	49	49	–	–	–	–	–	–	–	–
Tepaea Cook-Savage	–	–	24	–	–	–	–	24	24	24	–
Roderick Solo	–	–	44	44	44	44	44	–	–	44	44
Payton Spencer	–	–	–	–	74	74	74	–	–	–	–
Fehi Fineanganofo	–	–	–	–	–	33	33	33	33	–	–
Rhodes Featherstone	–	–	–	–	–	–	–	86	86	–	–
Xavier Tito-Harris	–	–	–	–	–	–	–	35	–	–	35
Cody Vai	–	–	–	–	–	–	–	25	25	–	–
Scott Curry	–	–	–	–	–	–	–	–	–	1	1
Tim Mikkelson	–	–	–	–	–	–	–	–	–	30	30

== Samoa ==
Head Coach: (Samoa) Brian Lima

Samoa team members 2022–23
Player	Jersey number by tournament										
Player	Hong Kong I	Dubai	Cape Town	Hamilton	Sydney	Los Angeles	Vancouver	Hong Kong II	Singapore	Toulouse	London
Va'a Apelu Maliko	2	2	2	2	2	2	2	2	2	2	2
Vaovasa Afa Su'a	1	1	1	1	1	1	1	1	1	1	1
Neueli Leitufia	8	8	8	8	8	8	8	8	8	8	8
Melani Matavao	7	–	–	–	7	7	7	–	–	–	7
Levi Milford	5	5	5	5	5	5	–	–	5	5	–
Owen Niue	11	11	11	11	11	11	11	–	11	–	–
Taunu'u Niulevaea	6	6	6	6	6	6	6	6	6	6	6
Steve Onosai	12	12	12	12	–	–	–	12	–	–	–
Motu Opetai	4	4	4	4	4	4	4	4	4	4	4
Paulo Scanlan	10	10	10	10	10	10	10	10	10	10	–
Uaina Tui Sione	3	3	3	3	–	–	–	–	–	–	–
Paul Eti Slater	9	9	9	9	9	9	9	9	9	9	9
Paul Stanley	13	–	–	–	–	–	–	–	–	–	–
Fa'afoi Falaniko	–	15	15	15	15	15	15	15	15	15	15
Tuna Tuitama	–	14	14	14	14	14	–	14	14	–	–
BJ Telefoni Lima	–	–	–	–	16	16	16	16	–	–	–
Fuli Faafouina	–	–	–	–	–	–	23	–	–	–	23
Malo Luteru	–	–	–	–	–	–	22	22	22	22	22
Pelosi Taupo	–	–	–	–	–	–	–	25	25	–	–
Malakesi Masefau	–	–	–	–	–	–	–	–	–	18	18
Faamoni Jr Suetena	–	–	–	–	–	–	–	–	–	33	–
Taleta Tupuola	–	–	–	–	–	–	–	–	–	20	–
Pisi Leilua	–	–	–	–	–	–	–	–	–	–	80
Elijah Niko	–	–	–	–	–	–	–	–	–	–	17

== South Africa ==
Head Coach: (South Africa) Sandile Ngcobo

South Africa team members 2022–23
Player	Jersey number by tournament										
Player	Hong Kong I	Dubai	Cape Town	Hamilton	Sydney	Los Angeles	Vancouver	Hong Kong II	Singapore	Toulouse	London
Darren Adonis	21	–	21	21	21	–	–	–	–	–	–
Ronald Brown	9	–	–	–	–	9	9	–	–	9	9
Selvyn Davids	8	–	–	8	–	–	–	–	–	–	–
Branco du Preez	7	7	7	–	–	–	–	–	–	–	–
Christie Grobbelaar	14	–	–	14	14	14	14	14	14	14	14
Dewald Human	10	10	–	–	–	–	–	–	–	10	10
Sako Makata	1	–	–	–	–	–	–	–	–	–	–
Mfundo Ndhlovu	13	–	–	–	–	13	13	13	13	13	13
Ryan Oosthuizen	2	2	2	2	2	2	2	2	2	2	2
JC Pretorius	6	6	6	–	–	–	–	–	–	–	–
Siviwe Soyizwapi	11	11	11	11	11	11	11	11	11	11	11
Shilton van Wyk	20	20	20	20	20	20	20	–	–	20	20
Impi Visser	3	3	3	3	3	3	3	3	3	3	3
Dalvon Blood	–	25	25	25	25	–	–	–	–	–	–
Zain Davids	–	4	4	4	4	4	4	4	–	–	–
Ricardo Duarttee	–	29	29	29	29	29	29	29	29	29	29
Muller du Plessis	–	12	12	–	–	–	–	–	–	–	–
Masande Mtshali	–	18	18	18	18	18	–	–	–	–	–
James Murphy	–	5	5	–	5	5	5	–	–	5	5
Jaiden Baron	–	–	–	26	26	26	–	–	26	–	–
Shaun Williams	–	–	–	15	15	–	–	15	15	15	15
Travis Ismaiel	–	–	–	–	–	28	28	28	28	28	28
Noegh Hayward	–	–	–	–	–	–	27	–	–	–	–
Gurshwin Wehr	–	–	–	–	–	–	19	–	–	–	–
Donavan Don	–	–	–	–	–	–	–	34	34	–	–
Ethan James	–	–	–	–	–	–	–	31	31	–	–
Sebastiaan Jobb	–	–	–	–	–	–	–	33	33	–	–
Tiaan Pretorius	–	–	–	–	–	–	–	30	30	–	–
Justin Geduld	–	–	–	–	–	–	–	–	–	23	23

== Spain ==
Head Coach: (Spain) Pablo Feijoo (until Cape Town ), (Spain) Francisco Hernández (from Hamilton)

Spain team members 2022–23
Player	Jersey number by tournament										
Player	Hong Kong I	Dubai	Cape Town	Hamilton	Sydney	Los Angeles	Vancouver	Hong Kong II	Singapore	Toulouse	London
Enrique Bolinches	13	–	–	13	13	13	–	13	13	–	–
Javier de Orbaneja	16	–	16	–	–	–	–	–	–	–	–
Alejandro Laforga	19	19	19	19	19	19	19	19	19	19	19
Eduardo Lopez	12	12	12	12	12	12	12	12	12	12	–
Jaime Manteca	14	14	14	14	14	14	14	14	14	14	14
Juan Martínez	8	8	8	8	8	8	8	–	–	–	–
Jamie Mata	6	6	–	–	–	–	6	6	6	6	6
Manu Moreno	10	10	10	10	10	–	10	10	10	10	10
Pol Pla	7	7	7	–	–	7	7	7	7	7	–
Juan Ramos	4	4	4	–	–	4	4	4	4	4	4
Tiago Romero	11	11	11	11	11	11	11	11	11	11	–
Manuel Sainz-Trapaga	3	–	–	3	3	–	–	–	–	–	3
Josep Serres	2	2	2	2	2	2	2	2	2	2	2
Francisco Cosculluela	–	5	5	5	5	–	–	–	–	–	–
Aratz de Goicoechea	–	9	9	–	–	9	–	–	–	–	–
Asier Perez	–	23	23	23	23	23	23	23	23	–	23
Miguel Reina	–	–	–	22	22	22	22	22	22	22	22
Francisco Soriano	–	–	–	15	15	–	–	–	–	–	15
Alvaro Rodriguez Gassot	–	–	–	–	–	24	24	–	–	–	–
Nico Nieto	–	–	–	–	–	–	–	26	26	26	26
Tobias Sainz-Trapaga	–	–	–	–	–	–	–	–	–	1	1
Joan Losada	–	–	–	–	–	–	–	–	–	30	–
Alejandro de la Rosa	–	–	–	–	–	–	–	–	–	–	43

== United States ==
Head Coach: (England) Mike Friday

United States team members 2022–23
Player	Jersey number by tournament										
Player	Hong Kong I	Dubai	Cape Town	Hamilton	Sydney	Los Angeles	Vancouver	Hong Kong II	Singapore	Toulouse	London
Perry Baker	11	11	11	11	11	11	11	11	11	–	–
Ben Broselle	2	2	2	2	2	–	–	–	–	–	–
Maceo Brown	4	–	–	4	4	–	–	–	–	–	–
Noah Brown	19	–	–	–	–	–	–	–	–	–	–
Adam Channel	16	–	–	–	–	16	16	16	16	–	–
Will Chevalier	23	–	–	–	–	–	–	–	–	–	–
Aaron Cummings	1	1	1	1	1	1	1	1	1	1	1
Gavan D'Amore	15	15	15	15	15	15	15	15	15	–	–
Malacchi Esdale	8	8	8	8	8	8	8	8	8	8	8
David Still	3	3	3	3	3	3	3	3	–	3	3
Cody Melphy	13	–	–	–	–	–	13	–	–	–	–
Marcus Tupuola	14	14	14	14	14	14	14	14	14	–	14
Sam Walsh	20	–	–	–	–	–	–	–	–	–	–
Naima Fuala'au	–	7	–	7	7	7	7	–	7	7	–
Lucas Lacamp	–	12	12	–	–	–	–	12	12	12	12
Joe Schroeder	–	5	5	5	5	5	–	5	5	5	5
Stephen Tomasin	–	9	9	9	9	9	9	9	9	9	9
Kevon Williams	–	6	6	6	6	6	6	6	6	6	6
Lance Williams	–	24	24	–	–	–	–	–	–	–	–
Faitala Talapusi	–	–	10	10	10	10	10	10	10	10	10
Maka Unufe	–	–	–	–	–	18	18	–	–	18	18
Pita Vi	–	–	–	–	–	–	–	25	25	25	25
Ryan Santos	–	–	–	–	–	–	–	–	–	27	27
Jack Wendling	–	–	–	–	–	–	–	–	–	26	26

== Uruguay ==
Head Coach: (Uruguay) Ivo Dugonjic

Uruguay team members 2022–23
Player	Jersey number by tournament										
Player	Hong Kong I	Dubai	Cape Town	Hamilton	Sydney	Los Angeles	Vancouver	Hong Kong II	Singapore	Toulouse	London
Baltazar Amaya	10	–	–	10	10	10	10	10	10	10	10
Ignacio Alvarez	13	13	–	13	13	13	13	13	13	13	13
Diego Ardao	6	6	6	6	6	6	6	6	6	6	6
Bautista Basso	5	5	5	5	5	5	5	5	5	5	5
Koba Brazionis	12	12	12	–	–	12	12	12	12	12	12
Carlos Deus	1	1	1	–	–	–	–	–	–	–	–
Tomás Etcheverry	3	3	3	3	3	3	3	3	3	3	3
Ignacio Facciolo	11	11	11	11	11	11	11	11	11	11	11
Jose Iruleguy	8	8	–	8	8	8	8	–	–	–	–
Guillermo Lijtenstein	9	9	9	9	9	9	9	9	9	9	9
James McCubbin	4	4	4	4	4	4	4	4	4	4	4
Marcos Pastore	2	2	2	–	–	–	–	–	–	–	2
Mateo Viñals	7	7	7	7	7	7	–	7	7	7	7
Felipe Arcos Pérez	–	20	20	20	–	20	20	20	20	20	20
Valentin Grille	–	–	21	21	21	–	21	21	21	21	–
Eugenio Plottier	–	–	–	15	15	15	15	–	–	–	–
Juan Gonzalez	–	–	–	–	14	–	–	–	–	–	–
Sebastian Schroeder	–	–	–	–	–	–	–	22	22	–	–
Juan Tafernaberry	–	–	–	–	–	–	–	–	–	23	23

== Non-core teams ==
One place in each tournament of the series is allocated to a national team based on performance in the respective continental tournaments within Africa, Asia, Europe, Oceania, and the Americas.

== Chile ==
Head Coach: (Chile) Edmundo Olfos

Chile team members 2022–23
Player	Jersey number by tournament	
Player	Los Angeles	Vancouver
Tomás Alvarado	13	13
Clemente Armstrong	1	1
Lucca Avelli	7	7
Manuel Bustamante	6	6
Santiago Edwards	3	3
Diego Greiber	11	11
Baltazar Jana	9	9
Frederico Kennedy	12	12
Dante Marchese	10	10
Luca Strabucchi	2	2
Ernesto Tchimino	8	8
Marcelo Torrealba	4	4
Iñaki Tuset	5	5

== Germany ==
Head Coach: (Portugal) António Aguilar

Germany team members 2022–23
Player	Jersey number by tournament
Player	Toulouse
Hannes Adler	49
Zani Dembele	66
Ben Ellermann	8
Daniel Eneke	30
Anton Gleitze	10
Philip Gleitze	11
Fabian Heimpel	6
Felix Hufnagel	1
Nikolai Klewinghaus	16
Tim Lichtenberg	12
Robin Plümpe	24
Bastian van der Bosch	2
Chris Umeh	71

== Hong Kong ==
Head Coach: (Wales) Jevon Groves

Hong Kong team members 2022–23
Player	Jersey number by tournament		
Player	Hong Kong I	Hong Kong II	Singapore
Seb Brien	11	11	–
Michael Coverdale	2	–	2
Max Denmark	8	8	8
Liam Doherty	12	–	–
Salom Yiu	13	13	–
Mak Kwai Chung	7	7	7
Cado Lee	6	–	–
Pierce MacKinlay-West	5	5	–
Alex McQueen	9	9	–
Alessandro Nardoni	3	3	3
Harry Sayers	4	–	–
Russell Webb	10	10	–
Max Woodward	1	1	–
James Christie	–	21	–
Liam Herbert	–	17	17
Callum McCullough	–	14	14
Hugo Stiles	–	15	–
Kane Boucaut	–	–	20
Jack Combes	–	–	26
Fong Kit Fung	–	–	16
Jamie Hood	–	–	24
Bryan Phillips	–	–	19
James Swayer	–	–	27
Eric Kwok	–	–	22

== Tonga ==
Head Coach: (Tonga) Tevita Tuifua

Tonga team members 2022–23
Player	Jersey number by tournament		
Player	Hamilton	Sydney	London
Tevita Eukaliti	5	5	–
Sioeli Filimoehala	8	8	–
Samson Fualalo	2	2	2
Siaosi Huihui	3	3	3
John Ika	9	9	9
Tevita Manukea	14	14	14
Laulea Mau	6	6	6
Niukula Osika	13	–	–
Atieli Pakalani	10	10	10
John Tapueluelu	12	12	12
Kyren Taumoefolau	7	7	7
Rodney Tongotea	11	11	11
Sione Tupou	1	1	1
Semisi Maasi	–	4	4
Samisoni Asi	–	–	8
Josua Tuipulotu	–	–	5

== Uganda ==
Head Coach: (Kenya) Tolbert Onyango

Uganda team members 2022–23
Player	Jersey number by tournament	
Player	Dubai	Cape Town
Karim Arinaitwe	4	4
Alex Aturinda	1	1
Desire Ayera	8	8
Tawfik Bagalana	7	7
Denis Etwau	14	14
Adrian Kasito	10	10
Timothy Kisiga	11	11
Timothy Mugisha	13	13
Ian Munyani	3	3
William Nkore	12	12
Aaron Ofoyrwoth	9	9
Mumbarak Wandera	2	2
Michael Wokorach	6	6
