= 2023 France Sevens =

Rugby sevens tournament

- Sevens World Series XXIV
- Host nation: France
- Date: 12–14 May 2023

Cup
- Champion: New Zealand
- Runner-up: Argentina
- Third: France

Tournament details
- Matches played: 45

The 2023 France Sevens was a rugby sevens tournament that took place at Stade Ernest-Wallon in Toulouse on 12, 13 and 14 May 2023. It was the 22nd edition of the France Sevens, and the tenth tournament of the 2022–23 World Rugby Sevens Series. Sixteen teams competed in the tournament.

New Zealand were the champions after beating Argentina in the cup final.

== Background ==
The 2023 France Sevens is the tenth round of eleven in the 2022–23 season

== Teams ==
Sixteen teams competed in the tournament. Fifteen core teams and one invited team.

Core Teams
- Argentina
- Australia
- Canada
- Fiji
- France
- Great Britain
- Ireland
- Japan
- Kenya
- New Zealand
- Samoa
- South Africa
- Spain
- United States
- Uruguay

Invited Team

- Germany

== Format ==
The teams were divided into pools of four teams, who played a round-robin within the pool. Points were awarded in each pool on the standard schedule for rugby sevens tournaments (though different from the standard in the 15-man game)—3 for a win, 2 for a draw, 1 for a loss. The draw consists of sixteen teams with fifteen of them being core teams that compete in each series event, plus an invitational team. These teams competed in Pools A, B, C, and D. The winners and runners-up from each pool in the main draw qualified for the Cup quarterfinals. The losers of these quarterfinals competed in the placement matches.

== Pool stage ==
Teams were awarded 3 points for a win, 2 points for a draw and 1 point for a loss. No bonus points were awarded.

Key to colours in group tables
Teams that advanced to the Cup quarterfinals
Teams that advanced to the 9th place quarterfinals

=== Pool A ===
Pos	Team	Pld	W	D	L	PF	PA	PD	Pts
1	New Zealand	3	3	0	0	74	29	+45	9
2	Canada	3	2	0	1	71	36	+35	7
3	Uruguay	3	1	0	2	31	45	–14	5
4	Kenya	3	0	0	3	17	83	–66	3

12 May
00:00

New Zealand	14–12	Uruguay

Stade Ernest-Wallon, Toulouse

12 May
00:00

Kenya	7–33	Canada

Stade Ernest-Wallon, Toulouse

13 May
00:00

New Zealand	29–12	Canada

Stade Ernest-Wallon, Toulouse

13 May
00:00

Uruguay	19–5	Kenya

Stade Ernest-Wallon, Toulouse

13 May
00:00

Uruguay	0–26	Canada

Stade Ernest-Wallon, Toulouse

13 May
00:00

New Zealand	31–5	Kenya

Stade Ernest-Wallon, Toulouse

=== Pool B ===
Pos	Team	Pld	W	D	L	PF	PA	PD	Pts
1	Argentina	3	3	0	0	100	26	+74	9
2	Great Britain	3	2	0	1	28	50	–22	7
3	Spain	3	1	0	2	48	35	+13	5
4	Germany	3	0	0	3	7	72	–65	3

12 May
00:00

Argentina	50–0	Great Britain

Stade Ernest-Wallon, Toulouse

12 May
00:00

Spain	29–0	Germany

Stade Ernest-Wallon, Toulouse

13 May
00:00

Argentina	29–7	Germany

Stade Ernest-Wallon, Toulouse

13 May
00:00

Great Britain	14–0	Spain

Stade Ernest-Wallon, Toulouse

13 May
00:00

Great Britain	14–0	Germany

Stade Ernest-Wallon, Toulouse

13 May
00:00

Argentina	21–19	Spain

Stade Ernest-Wallon, Toulouse

=== Pool C ===
Pos	Team	Pld	W	D	L	PF	PA	PD	Pts
1	France	3	3	0	0	74	40	+34	9
2	South Africa	3	2	0	1	55	45	+10	7
3	Fiji	3	0	1	2	47	69	–22	4
4	United States	3	0	1	2	42	64	–22	4

12 May
00:00

Fiji	19–24	France

Stade Ernest-Wallon, Toulouse

12 May
00:00

South Africa	24–7	United States

Stade Ernest-Wallon, Toulouse

13 May
00:00

Fiji	21–21	United States

Stade Ernest-Wallon, Toulouse

13 May
00:00

France	31–7	South Africa

Stade Ernest-Wallon, Toulouse

13 May
00:00

France	19–14	United States

Stade Ernest-Wallon, Toulouse

13 May
00:00

Fiji	7–24	South Africa

Stade Ernest-Wallon, Toulouse

=== Pool D ===
Pos	Team	Pld	W	D	L	PF	PA	PD	Pts
1	Australia	3	3	0	0	87	17	+70	9
2	Ireland	3	2	0	1	85	24	+61	7
3	Samoa	3	1	0	2	47	52	–5	5
4	Japan	3	0	0	3	17	143	–126	3

12 May
00:00

Samoa	7–26	Australia

Stade Ernest-Wallon, Toulouse

12 May
00:00

Japan	0–66	Ireland

Stade Ernest-Wallon, Toulouse

13 May
00:00

Samoa	12–14	Ireland

Stade Ernest-Wallon, Toulouse

13 May
00:00

Australia	49–5	Japan

Stade Ernest-Wallon, Toulouse

13 May
00:00

Australia	12–5	Ireland

Stade Ernest-Wallon, Toulouse

13 May
00:00

Samoa	28–12	Japan

Stade Ernest-Wallon, Toulouse

== Knockout stage ==
=== Thirteenth place ===
13th place semifinal
14 May 2023– Stade Ernest-Wallon
Japan	28
Germany	12
14 May 2023– Stade Ernest-Wallon
Kenya	19
United States	0

13th place final
14 May 2023– Stade Ernest-Wallon
Japan	12
Kenya	33

=== Ninth place ===
9th place Quarterfinals
13 May 2023– Stade Ernest-Wallon
Uruguay	17
Japan	5
13 May 2023– Stade Ernest-Wallon
Fiji	28
Germany	5
13 May 2023– Stade Ernest-Wallon
Samoa	17
Kenya	10
13 May 2023– Stade Ernest-Wallon
Spain	42
United States	14

9th place Semifinals
14 May 2023– Stade Ernest-Wallon
Uruguay	15
Fiji	31
14 May 2023– Stade Ernest-Wallon
Samoa	5
Spain	28

9th place Final
14 May 2023– Stade Ernest-Wallon
Fiji	26
Spain	15

=== 5th to 8th place ===
5th place semifinal
14 May 2023– Stade Ernest-Wallon
Ireland	22
Great Britain	0
14 May 2023– Stade Ernest-Wallon
Australia	21
South Africa	19

5th place final
14 May 2023– Stade Ernest-Wallon
Ireland	21
Australia	26

=== Cup playoffs ===
Cup quarterfinals
13 May 2023– Stade Ernest-Wallon
New Zealand	35
Ireland	0
13 May 2023– Stade Ernest-Wallon
France	17
Great Britain	12
13 May 2023– Stade Ernest-Wallon
Australia	10
Canada	12
13 May 2023– Stade Ernest-Wallon
Argentina	21
South Africa	12

Cup semifinals
14 May 2023– Stade Ernest-Wallon
New Zealand	19
France	14
14 May 2023– Stade Ernest-Wallon
Canada	5
Argentina	33

Cup final
14 May 2023– Stade Ernest-Wallon
New Zealand	24 (a.e.t.)
Argentina	19
Bronze final
14 May 2023– Stade Ernest-Wallon
France	28
Canada	12

== Tournament placings ==
Place	Team	Points
1st place, gold medalist(s)	New Zealand	22
2nd place, silver medalist(s)	Argentina	19
3rd place, bronze medalist(s)	France	17
4	Canada	15
5	Australia	13
6	Ireland	12
7	South Africa	10
7	Great Britain	10

Place	Team	Points
9	Fiji	8
10	Spain	7
11	Samoa	5
11	Uruguay	5
13	Kenya	3
14	Japan	2
15	United States	1
15	Germany	1

Source: World Rugby

== Players ==
=== Dream team ===
The following seven players were selected to the tournament dream team at the conclusion of the tournament

(Argentina) Marcos Moneta
(New Zealand) Roderick Solo
(New Zealand) Akuila Rokolisoa
(Argentina) Rodrigo Isgró
(Spain) Pol Pla
(Spain) Manu Moreno
(Argentina) Agustín Fraga

== See also ==
World Sevens Series XXIV
Preceded by 2023 Singapore Sevens	France Singapore Sevens	Succeeded by 2023 London Sevens
France Sevens
Preceded by 2022 France Sevens	2023 France Sevens	Succeeded by 2026 France Sevens
