= 2022 Hong Kong Sevens =

Rugby sevens tournament

- Sevens World Series XXIV
- Host nation: Hong Kong
- Date: 5–6 November 2022

Cup
- Champion: Australia
- Runner-up: Fiji
- Third: France

Tournament details
- Matches played: 45

The 2022 Hong Kong Sevens was a rugby sevens tournament that took place at the Hong Kong Stadium from 5–6 November 2022. It was the 45th edition of the Hong Kong Sevens, and the first tournament of the 2022–23 World Rugby Sevens Series. Sixteen teams competed in the tournament.

Australia were the champions after beating the defending champions of the past five events in Hong Kong Fiji in the cup final. Australia was also the first team since the 2014 Hong Kong Sevens to beat Fiji in Hong Kong.

== Background ==
The 2022 Hong Kong Sevens is the first round of eleven in the 2022–23 season

== Teams ==
Sixteen teams competed in the tournament. Fifteen core teams and one invited team.

Core Teams
- Argentina
- Australia
- Canada
- Fiji
- France
- Great Britain
- Ireland
- Japan
- Kenya
- New Zealand
- Samoa
- South Africa
- Spain
- United States
- Uruguay

Invited Team

- Hong Kong

== Format ==
The teams were divided into pools of four teams, who played a round-robin within the pool. Points were awarded in each pool on the standard schedule for rugby sevens tournaments (though different from the standard in the 15-man game)—3 for a win, 2 for a draw, 1 for a loss. The draw consists of sixteen teams with fifteen of them being core teams that compete in each series event, plus an invitational team. These teams competed in Pools A, B, C, and D. The winners and runners-up from each pool in the main draw qualified for the Cup quarterfinals. The losers of these quarterfinals competed in the placement matches.

== Pool stage ==
=== Pool A ===
Team	Pld	W	D	L	PD	Pts
Samoa	3	3	0	0	45	9
Australia	3	2	0	1	45	7
New Zealand	3	1	0	2	–7	5
Hong Kong	3	0	0	3	–83	3

5 November
00:00

Hong Kong	0–34	Australia

Hong Kong Stadium, Hong Kong

5 November
00:00

Samoa	24–0	New Zealand

Hong Kong Stadium, Hong Kong

5 November
00:00

New Zealand	38–14	Hong Kong

Hong Kong Stadium, Hong Kong

5 November
00:00

Australia	22–17	Samoa

Hong Kong Stadium, Hong Kong

5 November
00:00

New Zealand	24–17	Australia

Hong Kong Stadium, Hong Kong

5 November
00:00

Hong Kong	15–31	Samoa

Hong Kong Stadium, Hong Kong

=== Pool B ===
Team	Pld	W	D	L	PD	Pts
France	3	3	0	0	45	9
South Africa	3	3	0	0	17	5
Great Britain	3	1	0	2	–34	5
Uruguay	3	1	0	2	–59	5

5 November
00:00

France	34–0	Great Britain

Hong Kong Stadium, Hong Kong

5 November
00:00

South Africa	21–0	Uruguay

Hong Kong Stadium, Hong Kong

5 November
00:00

Uruguay	5–45	France

Hong Kong Stadium, Hong Kong

5 November
00:00

Great Britain	12–10	South Africa

Hong Kong Stadium, Hong Kong

5 November
00:00

Uruguay	19–17	Great Britain

Hong Kong Stadium, Hong Kong

5 November
00:00

France	19–17	South Africa

Hong Kong Stadium, Hong Kong

=== Pool C ===
Team	Pld	W	D	L	PD	Pts
Fiji	3	3	0	0	85	9
United States	3	2	0	1	–10	7
Spain	3	1	0	2	–1	5
Japan	3	0	0	3	–74	3

5 November
00:00

United States	15–14	Spain

Hong Kong Stadium, Hong Kong

5 November
00:00

Fiji	59–12	Japan

Hong Kong Stadium, Hong Kong

5 November
00:00

Japan	22–35	United States

Hong Kong Stadium, Hong Kong

5 November
00:00

Spain	21–35	Fiji

Hong Kong Stadium, Hong Kong

5 November
00:00

Japan	19–33	Spain

Hong Kong Stadium, Hong Kong

5 November
00:00

United States	0–24	Fiji

Hong Kong Stadium, Hong Kong

=== Pool D ===
Team	Pld	W	D	L	PD	Pts
Ireland	3	3	0	0	22	9
Argentina	3	2	0	1	51	7
Canada	3	1	0	2	–33	5
Kenya	3	0	0	3	–40	3

5 November
00:00

Ireland	28–12	Kenya

Hong Kong Stadium, Hong Kong

5 November
00:00

Argentina	36–0	Canada

Hong Kong Stadium, Hong Kong

5 November
00:00

Canada	17–19	Ireland

Hong Kong Stadium, Hong Kong

5 November
00:00

Kenya	7–26	Argentina

Hong Kong Stadium, Hong Kong

5 November
00:00

Canada	19–14	Kenya

Hong Kong Stadium, Hong Kong

5 November
00:00

Ireland	21–17	Argentina

Hong Kong Stadium, Hong Kong

== Placement matches ==
=== Thirteenth place ===
13th place semifinal
6 November 2022– Hong Kong Stadium
Kenya	7
Uruguay	10
6 November 2022– Hong Kong Stadium
Hong Kong	17
Japan	24

13th place final
6 November 2022– Hong Kong Stadium
Uruguay	33
Japan	10

=== Ninth place ===
9th place Quarterfinals
6 November 2022– Hong Kong Stadium
New Zealand	43
Kenya	0
6 November 2022– Hong Kong Stadium
Spain	19
Uruguay	14
7 April 2019 – Hong Kong Stadium
Canada	19
Hong Kong	17
6 November 2022– Hong Kong Stadium
Great Britain	29
Japan	0

9th place Semifinals
6 November 2022– Hong Kong Stadium
New Zealand	24
Spain	17
6 November 2022– Hong Kong Stadium
Canada	17
Great Britain	12

9th place Final
6 November 2022– Hong Kong Stadium
New Zealand	33
Canada	5

== Cup ==
=== 5th to 8th playoffs ===
5th place semifinal
6 November 2022– Hong Kong Stadium
Argentina	19
South Africa	12
6 November 2022– Hong Kong Stadium
Ireland	7
United States	14

5th place final
6 November 2022– Hong Kong Stadium
Argentina	36
United States	0

=== Cup playoffs ===
Cup Quarterfinals
6 November 2022– Hong Kong Stadium
Samoa	19 (a.e.t.)
Argentina	14
6 November 2022 – Hong Kong Stadium
Fiji	12
South Africa	5
6 November 2022– Hong Kong Stadium
Ireland	19
Australia	26
6 November 2022– Hong Kong Stadium
France	28
United States	14

Cup Semifinals
6 November 2022– Hong Kong Stadium
Samoa	7
Fiji	19
6 November 2022– Hong Kong Stadium
Australia	10 (a.e.t.)
France	7

Cup Final
6 November 2022– Hong Kong Stadium
Fiji	17
Australia	20
Bronze Medal Final
6 November 2022– Hong Kong Stadium
Samoa	17
France	19

=== Tournament placings ===
Place	Team	Points
1st place, gold medalist(s)	Australia	22
2nd place, silver medalist(s)	Fiji	19
3rd place, bronze medalist(s)	France	17
4	Samoa	15
5	Argentina	13
6	United States	12
7	Ireland	10
7	South Africa	10

Place	Team	Points
9	New Zealand	8
10	Canada	7
11	Great Britain	5
11	Spain	5
13	Uruguay	3
14	Japan	2
15	Kenya	1
15	Hong Kong	1

Source: World Rugby

=== Players ===
==== Dream team ====
The following seven players were selected to the tournament dream team at the conclusion of the tournament:

(Samoa) Va'a Apelu Maliko
(Australia) Maurice Longbottom
(Fiji) Waisea Nacuqu
(Australia) Henry Hutchison
(Fiji) Vuiviawa Naduvalo
(Australia) Josh Turner
(France) Aaron Grandidier-Nkanang

World Sevens Series XXIV
Preceded by None (first event)	2022 Hong Kong Sevens	Succeeded by 2022 Dubai Sevens
Hong Kong Sevens
Preceded by 2019 Hong Kong Sevens	2022 Hong Kong Sevens	Succeeded by 2023 Hong Kong Sevens
