= 2022 South Africa Sevens =

Rugby sevens tournament

- Sevens World Series XXIV
- Host nation: South Africa
- Date: 9–11 December 2022

Cup
- Champion: Samoa
- Runner-up: New Zealand
- Third: United States

Tournament details
- Matches played: 45

The 2022 South Africa Sevens was the third tournament within the 2022–23 World Rugby Sevens Series and the 22nd South Africa Sevens tournament. The event was won by Samoa 7s, defeating New Zealand 7s by 12–7 in the final. It was held on 9–11 December 2022 at the DHL Stadium in Cape Town, South Africa.

== Format ==
The 16 teams were drawn into four pools of four. Each team plays every other team in their pool once. The top two teams from each pool advance to the Cup playoffs and compete for gold, silver and bronze medals. The other teams from each pool go to the classification playoffs for 9th to 16th placings.

== Teams ==
Fifteen core teams participated in the tournament along with one invited team, Uganda.

Core Teams

- Argentina
- Australia
- Canada
- Fiji
- France
- Great Britain
- Ireland
- Japan
- Kenya
- New Zealand
- Samoa
- South Africa
- Spain
- United States
- Uruguay

Invited Team

- Uganda

== Pool stage ==
All times in South African Standard Time (UTC+2:00)

Key to colours in group tables
Teams that advanced to the Cup quarter-final

=== Pool A ===
Team	Pld	W	D	L	PD	Pts
South Africa	3	3	0	0	39	9
Fiji	3	2	0	1	42	7
France	3	1	0	2	-45	5
Canada	3	0	0	3	-36	3

9 December
00:00

France	0–33	Fiji

DHL Stadium, Cape Town

9 December
00:00

South Africa	17–7	Canada

DHL Stadium, Cape Town

10 December
00:00

Canada	12–19	France

DHL Stadium, Cape Town

10 December
00:00

Fiji	7–17	South Africa

DHL Stadium, Cape Town

10 December
00:00

Canada	17–36	Fiji

DHL Stadium, Cape Town

10 December
00:00

France	7–26	South Africa

DHL Stadium, Cape Town

=== Pool B ===
Team	Pld	W	D	L	PD	Pts
Samoa	3	2	0	1	49	7
Uruguay	3	2	0	1	20	7
Ireland	3	2	0	1	18	7
Japan	3	0	0	3	-87	3

9 December
00:00

Samoa	21–10	Uruguay

DHL Stadium, Cape Town

9 December
00:00

Ireland	19–5	Japan

DHL Stadium, Cape Town

10 December
00:00

Japan	0–45	Samoa

DHL Stadium, Cape Town

10 December
00:00

Uruguay	22–19	Ireland

DHL Stadium, Cape Town

10 December
00:00

Japan	5–33	Uruguay

DHL Stadium, Cape Town

10 December
00:00

Samoa	14–21	Ireland

DHL Stadium, Cape Town

=== Pool C ===
Pool C saw a huge upset with defending champions New Zealand defeated 14-10 by Spain.

Team	Pld	W	D	L	PD	Pts
New Zealand	3	2	0	1	28	7
Argentina	3	2	0	1	34	7
Spain	3	1	1	1	-22	6
Kenya	3	0	1	2	-40	4

9 December
00:00

Argentina	19–5	Kenya

DHL Stadium, Cape Town

9 December
00:00

New Zealand	10–14	Spain

DHL Stadium, Cape Town

10 December
00:00

Spain	0–26	Argentina

DHL Stadium, Cape Town

10 December
00:00

Kenya	5–31	New Zealand

DHL Stadium, Cape Town

10 December
00:00

Spain	5–5	Kenya

DHL Stadium, Cape Town

10 December
00:00

Argentina	15–21	New Zealand

DHL Stadium, Cape Town

=== Pool D ===
Team	Pld	W	D	L	PD	Pts
United States	3	2	1	0	64	8
Great Britain	3	2	0	1	4	7
Australia	3	1	1	1	29	6
Uganda	3	0	0	3	-97	3

9 December
00:00

Australia	19–21	Great Britain

DHL Stadium, Cape Town

9 December
00:00

United States	38–5	Uganda

DHL Stadium, Cape Town

10 December
00:00

Uganda	0–38	Australia

DHL Stadium, Cape Town

10 December
00:00

Great Britain	5–36	United States

DHL Stadium, Cape Town

10 December
00:00

Uganda	5–38	Great Britain

DHL Stadium, Cape Town

10 December
00:00

Australia	19–19	United States

DHL Stadium, Cape Town

== Placement matches ==
=== 13th to 16th place playoffs ===
13th place semifinals
12:49 pm
Japan	14
Canada	31
1:11 pm
Kenya	19
Uganda	5

13th place final
4:07 pm
Canada	10
Kenya	21

=== 9th to 12 place playoffs ===
9th place quarterfinals
10 December
Spain	40
Japan	5
10 December
Australia	33
Canada	7
10 December
Ireland	19
Kenya	14
10 December
France	24
Uganda	7

9th place semifinals
11 December
Spain	0
Australia	26
11 December
Ireland	12
France	19

Final
11 December
Australia	24
France	12

== Knockout stage ==
=== Fifth place ===
5th place semifinal
12:49 pm
Uruguay	0
Fiji	38
1:11 pm
Argentina	26
Great Britain	14

5th place final
4:07 pm
Fiji	29
Argentina	5

=== Cup playoffs ===
Quarter-finals
10 December
New Zealand	50
Uruguay	0
10 December
United States	17
Fiji	7
10 December
Samoa	22
Argentina	10
10 December
South Africa	21
Great Britain	14

Semi-finals
11 December
New Zealand	33
United States	17
11 December
Samoa	10
South Africa	7

Final
11 December
New Zealand	7
Samoa	12
Bronze final
11 December
United States	22
South Africa	14

== Tournament placings ==
Place	Team	Points
1st place, gold medalist(s)	Samoa	22
2nd place, silver medalist(s)	New Zealand	19
3rd place, bronze medalist(s)	United States	17
4	South Africa	15
5	Argentina	13
6	Fiji	12
7	Great Britain	10
7	Uruguay	10

Place	Team	Points
9	Australia	8
10	France	7
11	Ireland	5
11	Spain	5
13	Kenya	4
14	Canada	3
15	Japan	1
15	Uganda	1

Source: World Rugby

World Sevens Series XXIV
Preceded by 2022 Dubai Sevens	2022 South Africa Sevens	Succeeded by 2023 New Zealand Sevens
South Africa Sevens
Preceded by 2019 South Africa Sevens	2022 South Africa Sevens	Succeeded by 2023 South Africa Sevens
