= 2023 Sydney Sevens =

World Rugby Sevens Series tournament

- Sevens World Series XXIV
- Host nation: Australia
- Date: 27–29 January 2023

Cup
- Champion: New Zealand
- Runner-up: South Africa
- Third: Fiji

Tournament details
- Matches played: 45

The 2023 Sydney Sevens was the fourth tournament within the 2022–23 World Rugby Sevens Series and 22nd edition of the Australia Sevens since it began in 2000. It was held on 27, 28 and 29 January 2023 at Allianz Stadium in Sydney, Australia.

== Format ==
The 16 teams were drawn into four pools of four. Each team plays every other team in their pool once. The top two teams from each pool advance to the Cup playoffs and compete for gold, silver and bronze medals. The other teams from each pool go to the classification playoffs for 9th to 16th placings.

== Teams ==
Fifteen core teams participated in the tournament along with one invited team, Tonga.

Core Teams

- Argentina
- Australia
- Canada
- Fiji
- France
- Great Britain
- Ireland
- Japan
- Kenya
- New Zealand
- Samoa
- South Africa
- Spain
- United States
- Uruguay

Invited Team

- Tonga

== Pool stage ==
All times in Australia Standard Time (UTC+6:00)

Key to colours in group tables
| Teams that advanced to the Cup Quarterfinal |

=== Pool A ===
| Pos | Team | Pld | W | D | L | PF | PA | PD | Pts |
|---|---|---|---|---|---|---|---|---|---|
| 1 | Australia | 3 | 3 | 0 | 0 | 63 | 24 | +39 | 9 |
| 2 | Great Britain | 3 | 2 | 0 | 1 | 66 | 36 | +30 | 7 |
| 3 | Argentina | 3 | 1 | 0 | 2 | 53 | 74 | –21 | 5 |
| 4 | Canada | 3 | 0 | 0 | 3 | 31 | 79 | –48 | 3 |

27 January
00:00

| Australia | 12–7 | Great Britain |

Allianz Stadium, Sydney

27 January
00:00

| Argentina | 24–19 | Canada |

Allianz Stadium, Sydney

28 January
00:00

| Australia | 22–7 | Canada |

Allianz Stadium, Sydney

28 January
00:00

| Argentina | 19–26 | Great Britain |

Allianz Stadium, Sydney

28 January
00:00

| Great Britain | 33–5 | Canada |

Allianz Stadium, Sydney

28 January
00:00

| Argentina | 10–29 | Australia |

Allianz Stadium, Sydney

=== Pool B ===
| Pos | Team | Pld | W | D | L | PF | PA | PD | Pts |
|---|---|---|---|---|---|---|---|---|---|
| 1 | South Africa | 3 | 3 | 0 | 0 | 76 | 31 | +45 | 9 |
| 2 | New Zealand | 3 | 2 | 0 | 1 | 92 | 24 | +68 | 7 |
| 3 | Kenya | 3 | 1 | 0 | 2 | 29 | 83 | –64 | 5 |
| 4 | Uruguay | 3 | 0 | 0 | 3 | 38 | 97 | –59 | 3 |

27 January
00:00

| South Africa | 31–5 | Kenya |

Allianz Stadium, Sydney

27 January
00:00

| New Zealand | 45–7 | Uruguay |

Allianz Stadium, Sydney

28 January
00:00

| South Africa | 28–12 | Uruguay |

Allianz Stadium, Sydney

28 January
00:00

| New Zealand | 33–0 | Kenya |

Allianz Stadium, Sydney

28 January
00:00

| Kenya | 24–19 | Uruguay |

Allianz Stadium, Sydney

28 January
00:00

| New Zealand | 14–17 | South Africa |

Allianz Stadium, Sydney

=== Pool C ===
| Pos | Team | Pld | W | D | L | PF | PA | PD | Pts |
|---|---|---|---|---|---|---|---|---|---|
| 1 | Samoa | 3 | 2 | 1 | 0 | 78 | 34 | +44 | 8 |
| 2 | Ireland | 3 | 2 | 1 | 0 | 64 | 17 | +47 | 8 |
| 3 | United States | 3 | 1 | 0 | 2 | 40 | 66 | –26 | 5 |
| 4 | Spain | 3 | 0 | 0 | 3 | 29 | 94 | –65 | 3 |

27 January
00:00

| Ireland | 12–17 | Samoa |

Allianz Stadium, Sydney

27 January
00:00

| United States | 33–14 | Spain |

Allianz Stadium, Sydney

28 January
00:00

| Ireland | 26–0 | Spain |

Allianz Stadium, Sydney

28 January
00:00

| United States | 7–26 | Samoa |

Allianz Stadium, Sydney

28 January
00:00

| Samoa | 35–15 | Spain |

Allianz Stadium, Sydney

28 January
00:00

| United States | 0–26 | Ireland |

Allianz Stadium, Sydney

=== Pool D ===
| Pos | Team | Pld | W | D | L | PF | PA | PD | Pts |
|---|---|---|---|---|---|---|---|---|---|
| 1 | Fiji | 3 | 3 | 0 | 0 | 125 | 19 | +106 | 9 |
| 2 | France | 3 | 2 | 0 | 1 | 71 | 36 | +36 | 7 |
| 3 | Tonga | 3 | 1 | 0 | 2 | 33 | 104 | –71 | 5 |
| 4 | Japan | 3 | 0 | 0 | 3 | 29 | 99 | –70 | 3 |

27 January
00:00

| Fiji | 52–7 | Tonga |

Allianz Stadium, Sydney

27 January
00:00

| France | 19–17 | Japan |

Allianz Stadium, Sydney

28 January
00:00

| Fiji | 54–0 | Japan |

Allianz Stadium, Sydney

28 January
00:00

| France | 40–0 | Tonga |

Allianz Stadium, Sydney

28 January
00:00

| Tonga | 26–12 | Japan |

Allianz Stadium, Sydney

28 January
00:00

| France | 12–19 | Fiji |

Allianz Stadium, Sydney

== Placement matches ==
=== Thirteenth place ===
13th place semifinal
29 January – Allianz Stadium
Uruguay | 24
Japan | 19
29 January – Allianz Stadium
Spain | 17
Canada | 14

13th place final
29 January – Allianz Stadium
Uruguay | 26
Spain | 5

=== Ninth place ===
9th place Quarterfinals
28 January – Allianz Stadium
United States | 14
Uruguay | 12
28 January – Allianz Stadium
Argentina | 19
Japan | 12
28 January – Allianz Stadium
Kenya | 17
Spain | 12
28 January – Allianz Stadium
Tonga | 35
Canada | 14

9th place Semifinals
29 January – Allianz Stadium
United States | 17
Argentina | 19
29 January – Allianz Stadium
Kenya | 24
Tonga | 26

9th place Final
29 January – Allianz Stadium
Argentina | 21
Tonga | 12

== Cup ==
=== 5th to 8th playoffs ===
9th place semifinal
29 January – Allianz Stadium
Samoa | 24
Australia | 10
29 January – Allianz Stadium
Ireland | 21
Great Britain | 19

9th place finals
29 January – Allianz Stadium
Samoa | 24
Ireland | 12

=== Cup playoffs ===
Quarterfinals
28 January – Allianz Stadium
Samoa | 0
New Zealand | 12
28 January – Allianz Stadium
Australia | 14
France | 17
28 January – Allianz Stadium
South Africa | 26
Ireland | 12
28 January – Allianz Stadium
Fiji | 26
Great Britain | 14

Semifinals
29 January – Allianz Stadium
New Zealand | 36
France | 5
29 January – Allianz Stadium
South Africa | 31
Fiji | 12

Final
29 January – Allianz Stadium
New Zealand | 38
South Africa | 0
Bronze final
29 January – Allianz Stadium
France | 5
Fiji | 29

== Tournament placings ==
| Place | Team | Points |
|---|---|---|
| 1st place, gold medalist(s) | New Zealand | 22 |
| 2nd place, silver medalist(s) | South Africa | 19 |
| 3rd place, bronze medalist(s) | Fiji | 17 |
| 4 | France | 15 |
| 5 | Samoa | 13 |
| 6 | Ireland | 12 |
| 7 | Australia | 10 |
| 7 | Great Britain | 10 |

| Place | Team | Points |
|---|---|---|
| 9 | Argentina | 8 |
| 10 | Tonga | 7 |
| 11 | United States | 5 |
| 11 | Kenya | 5 |
| 13 | Uruguay | 3 |
| 14 | Spain | 2 |
| 15 | Canada | 1 |
| 15 | Japan | 1 |

Source: World Rugby

== Players ==
Dream Team
| Forwards | Backs |
|---|---|
| (New Zealand) Sam Dickson (Fiji) Viwa Naduvalo (New Zealand) Roderick Solo | (New Zealand) Leroy Carter (South Africa) Ricardo Duarttee; Manueli Maisamoa (New Zealand) Akuila Rokolisoa |

== See also ==
- 2023 Sydney Women's Sevens
- World Rugby Sevens Series
- 2022–23 World Rugby Sevens Series

World Sevens Series XXIV
| Preceded by 2023 New Zealand Sevens | 2023 Australia Sevens | Succeeded by 2023 USA Sevens |
Australia Sevens
| Preceded by 2020 Sydney Sevens | 2023 New Zealand Sevens | Succeeded by 2024 Australia Sevens |
