= 2023 Singapore Sevens =

Rugby sevens tournament

- Sevens World Series XXIV
- Host nation: Singapore
- Date: 8–9 April 2023

Cup
- Champion: New Zealand
- Runner-up: Argentina
- Third: France

Tournament details
- Matches played: 45

The 2023 Singapore Sevens was a rugby sevens tournament that took place at the National Stadium on 8 and 9 April 2023. It was the 6th edition of the Singapore Sevens, and the ninth tournament of the 2022–23 World Rugby Sevens Series. Sixteen teams competed in the tournament.

New Zealand were the champions after beating Argentina in the cup final.

== Background ==
The 2023 Singapore Sevens is the ninth round of eleven in the 2022–23 season

== Teams ==
Sixteen teams competed in the tournament. Fifteen core teams and one invited team.

Core Teams
- Argentina
- Australia
- Canada
- Fiji
- France
- Great Britain
- Ireland
- Japan
- Kenya
- New Zealand
- Samoa
- South Africa
- Spain
- United States
- Uruguay

Invited Team

- Hong Kong

== Format ==
The teams were divided into pools of four teams, who played a round-robin within the pool. Points were awarded in each pool on the standard schedule for rugby sevens tournaments (though different from the standard in the 15-man game)—3 for a win, 2 for a draw, 1 for a loss. The draw consists of sixteen teams with fifteen of them being core teams that compete in each series event, plus an invitational team. These teams competed in Pools A, B, C, and D. The winners and runners-up from each pool in the main draw qualified for the Cup quarterfinals. The losers of these quarterfinals competed in the placement matches.

== Pool stage ==
Teams were awarded 3 points for a win, 2 points for a draw and 1 point for a loss. No bonus points were awarded.

Key to colours in group tables
Teams that advanced to the Cup quarterfinals
Teams that advanced to the 9th place quarterfinals

=== Pool A ===
Pos	Team	Pld	W	D	L	PF	PA	PD	Pts
1	New Zealand	3	3	0	0	83	19	+64	9
2	Australia	3	2	0	1	79	24	+55	7
3	South Africa	3	1	0	2	38	43	–5	5
4	Hong Kong	3	0	0	3	12	126	–144	3

8 April
00:00

South Africa	0–19	Australia

National Stadium, Singapore

8 April
00:00

New Zealand	47–0	Hong Kong

National Stadium, Singapore

8 April
00:00

South Africa	31–12	Hong Kong

National Stadium, Singapore

8 April
00:00

New Zealand	24–12	Australia

National Stadium, Singapore

8 April
00:00

Australia	48–0	Hong Kong

National Stadium, Singapore

8 April
00:00

New Zealand	12–7	South Africa

National Stadium, Singapore

=== Pool B ===
Pos	Team	Pld	W	D	L	PF	PA	PD	Pts
1	Samoa	3	3	0	0	95	38	+57	9
2	Fiji	3	2	0	1	59	40	+19	7
3	Canada	3	1	0	2	40	67	–27	5
4	Spain	3	0	0	3	31	80	–49	3

8 April
00:00

Spain	19–28	Samoa

National Stadium, Singapore

8 April
00:00

Fiji	21–12	Canada

National Stadium, Singapore

8 April
00:00

Spain	7–21	Canada

National Stadium, Singapore

8 April
00:00

Fiji	28–0	Samoa

National Stadium, Singapore

8 April
00:00

Samoa	39–7	Canada

National Stadium, Singapore

8 April
00:00

Fiji	31–0	Spain

National Stadium, Singapore

=== Pool C ===
Pos	Team	Pld	W	D	L	PF	PA	PD	Pts
1	France	3	2	0	2	78	57	+21	8
2	Uruguay	3	2	1	1	69	64	+5	7
3	United States	3	1	1	1	68	69	–1	6
4	Kenya	3	0	0	3	14	36	–22	3

8 April
00:00

United States	21–24	Uruguay

National Stadium, Singapore

8 April
00:00

France	24–19	Kenya

National Stadium, Singapore

8 April
00:00

United States	21–19	Kenya

National Stadium, Singapore

8 April
00:00

France	26–12	Uruguay

National Stadium, Singapore

8 April
00:00

Uruguay	33–17	Kenya

National Stadium, Singapore

8 April
00:00

France	26–26	United States

National Stadium, Singapore

=== Pool D ===
Pos	Team	Pld	W	D	L	PF	PA	PD	Pts
1	Argentina	3	3	0	0	75	31	+44	9
2	Great Britain	3	2	0	1	46	36	+10	7
3	Japan	3	1	0	2	36	68	–32	5
4	Ireland	3	0	0	3	14	36	–22	3

8 April
00:00

Argentina	10–0	Ireland

National Stadium, Singapore

8 April
00:00

Great Britain	19–17	Japan

National Stadium, Singapore

8 April
00:00

Argentina	42–7	Japan

National Stadium, Singapore

8 April
00:00

Great Britain	14–7	Ireland

National Stadium, Singapore

8 April
00:00

Ireland	7–12	Japan

National Stadium, Singapore

8 April
00:00

Great Britain	17–19	Argentina

National Stadium, Singapore

== Placement matches ==
=== Thirteenth place ===
13th place semifinal
9 April 2023– National Stadium
Canada	26
Hong Kong	5
9 April 2023– National Stadium
United States	26
Ireland	12

13th place final
9 April 2023– National Stadium
Canada	17
United States	22

=== Ninth place ===
9th place Quarterfinals
9 April 2023– National Stadium
Canada	14
Kenya	28
9 April 2023– National Stadium
Japan	21
Hong Kong	5
9 April 2023– National Stadium
United States	10
Spain	22
9 April 2023– National Stadium
South Africa	12
Ireland	5

9th place Semifinals
9 April 2023– National Stadium
Kenya	40
Japan	7
9 April 2023– National Stadium
Spain	12
South Africa	5

9th place Final
9 April 2023– National Stadium
Kenya	10
Spain	26

== Cup ==
=== 5th to 8th place ===
5th place semifinal
9 April 2023– National Stadium
Uruguay	12
Australia	31
9 April 2023– National Stadium
France	12
Great Britain	17

5th place final
9 April 2023– National Stadium
Australia	26
Great Britain	19

=== Cup playoffs ===
Cup quarterfinals
9 April 2023– National Stadium
Samoa	22
Uruguay	7
9 April 2023– National Stadium
Argentina	29
Australia	12
9 April 2023– National Stadium
France	21
Fiji	33
9 April 2023– National Stadium
New Zealand	22
Great Britain	10

Cup semifinals
9 April 2023– National Stadium
Samoa	19
Argentina	24
9 April 2023– National Stadium
Fiji	10
New Zealand	19

Cup final
9 April 2023– National Stadium
Argentina	17
New Zealand	19
Bronze final
9 April 2023– National Stadium
Samoa	19
Fiji	24

== Tournament placings ==
Place	Team	Points
1st place, gold medalist(s)	New Zealand	22
2nd place, silver medalist(s)	Argentina	19
3rd place, bronze medalist(s)	Samoa	17
4	Fiji	15
5	Australia	13
6	Great Britain	12
7	France	10
7	Uruguay	10

Place	Team	Points
9	Spain	8
10	Kenya	7
11	South Africa	5
11	Japan	5
13	United States	3
14	Canada	2
15	Ireland	1
15	Hong Kong	1

Source: World Rugby

== Players ==
=== Dream team ===
The following seven players were selected to the tournament dream team at the conclusion of the tournament

(Argentina) Marcos Moneta
(Fiji) Joseva Talacolo
(New Zealand) Moses Leo
(Argentina) Rodrigo Isgró
(New Zealand) Sione Molia
(New Zealand) Regan Ware
(Samoa) Taunu'u Niulevaea

== See also ==
World Sevens Series XXIV
Preceded by 2023 Hong Kong Sevens	2023 Singapore Sevens	Succeeded by 2023 France Sevens
Singapore Sevens
Preceded by 2022 Singapore Sevens	2023 Singapore Sevens	Succeeded by 2024 Singapore Sevens
