= 2023 Canada Sevens =

Rugby sevens tournament

- Sevens World Series XXIII
- Host nation: Canada
- Date: 3–5 March 2023

Cup
- Champion: Argentina
- Runner-up: France
- Third: Australia

Tournament details
- Matches played: 45

The 2023 Canada Sevens was the eighth edition of the rugby sevens tournament. It was held at BC Place in Vancouver between 25 and 26 February 2023.

The tournament was won by Argentina national rugby sevens team, who successfully defended their 2022 title.

== Format ==
The sixteen teams were drawn into four pools of four. Each team played the three opponents in their pool once. The top two teams from each pool advanced to the Cup bracket, with the losers of the quarter-finals vying for a fifth-place finish. The remaining eight teams that finished third or fourth in their pool played off for 9th place, with the losers of the 9th-place quarter-finals competing for 13th place.

== Teams ==
The sixteen national teams competing in Vancouver were:

Core Teams

- Argentina
- Australia
- Canada
- Fiji
- France
- Great Britain
- Ireland
- Japan
- Kenya
- New Zealand
- Samoa
- South Africa
- Spain
- United States
- Uruguay

Invited Team

- Chile

== Pool stage ==
Teams were awarded 3 points for a win, 2 points for a draw and 1 point for a loss. No bonus points were awarded.

Key to colours in group tables
Teams that advanced to the Cup quarterfinals
Teams that advanced to the 9th place quarterfinals

=== Pool A ===
Pos	Team	Pld	W	D	L	PF	PA	PD	Pts
1	New Zealand	3	3	0	0	109	97	+104	9
2	United States	3	2	0	1	33	83	–50	6
3	Samoa	3	1	0	2	48	73	–25	5
4	Spain	3	0	0	3	45	67	–22	4

3 March
00:00

Samoa	31–19	Spain

BC Place, Vancouver

3 March
00:00

New Zealand	52–0	United States

BC Place, Vancouver

4 March
00:00

Samoa	12–14	United States

BC Place, Vancouver

4 March
00:00

New Zealand	17–7	Spain

BC Place, Vancouver

4 March
00:00

Spain	19–19	United States

BC Place, Vancouver

4 March
00:00

New Zealand	40–5	Samoa

BC Place, Vancouver

=== Pool B ===
Pos	Team	Pld	W	D	L	PF	PA	PD	Pts
1	Argentina	3	3	0	0	64	24	+40	9
2	France	3	1	1	1	77	45	+32	6
3	South Africa	3	1	1	1	61	43	–18	6
4	Japan	3	0	0	3	29	119	–90	3

3 March
00:00

South Africa	19–19	France

BC Place, Vancouver

3 March
00:00

Argentina	31–12	Japan

BC Place, Vancouver

4 March
00:00

South Africa	40–12	Japan

BC Place, Vancouver

4 March
00:00

Argentina	21–12	France

BC Place, Vancouver

4 March
00:00

France	46–5	Japan

BC Place, Vancouver

4 March
00:00

Argentina	12–0	South Africa

BC Place, Vancouver

=== Pool C ===
Pos	Team	Pld	W	D	L	PF	PA	PD	Pts
1	Great Britain	3	2	0	1	86	43	+43	7
2	Fiji	3	2	0	1	71	44	+27	7
3	Uruguay	3	2	0	1	43	78	–35	7
4	Kenya	3	0	0	3	43	87	–35	3

3 March
00:00

Great Britain	45–5	Uruguay

BC Place, Vancouver

3 March
00:00

Fiji	31–12	Kenya

BC Place, Vancouver

4 March
00:00

Great Britain	26–12	Kenya

BC Place, Vancouver

4 March
00:00

Fiji	14–17	Uruguay

BC Place, Vancouver

4 March
00:00

Uruguay	21–19	Kenya

BC Place, Vancouver

4 March
00:00

Fiji	26–15	Great Britain

BC Place, Vancouver

=== Pool D ===
Pos	Team	Pld	W	D	L	PF	PA	PD	Pts
1	Ireland	3	2	0	1	92	33	+59	7
2	Australia	3	2	0	1	69	48	+21	7
3	Canada	3	2	0	1	69	54	–15	7
4	Chile	3	0	0	3	26	121	–95	3

3 March
00:00

Ireland	35–5	Canada

BC Place, Vancouver

3 March
00:00

Australia	36–12	Chile

BC Place, Vancouver

4 March
00:00

Ireland	50–7	Chile

BC Place, Vancouver

4 March
00:00

Australia	12–29	Canada

BC Place, Vancouver

4 March
00:00

Canada	28–0	Chile

BC Place, Vancouver

4 March
00:00

Australia	21–7	Ireland

BC Place, Vancouver

== Knockout stage ==
=== 13th–16th playoffs ===
13th place Semi-finals
5 March – BC Place
Japan	19
Chile	0
5 March – BC Place
South Africa	31
Canada	14

13th place Final
5 March – BC Place
Japan	5
South Africa	17

Matches

Semi-finals

5 March
00:00

Japan	19–0	Chile

BC Place, Vancouver

5 March
00:00

South Africa	31–7	Canada

BC Place, Vancouver

13th place Final

5 March
00:00

Japan	5–17	South Africa

BC Place, Vancouver

=== 9th–12th playoffs ===
Quarter-finals
4 March – BC Place
Uruguay	14
Japan	7
4 March – BC Place
Samoa	28
Chile	12
4 March – BC Place
South Africa	12
Kenya	17
4 March – BC Place
Canada	14
Spain	19

Semi-finals
5 March – BC Place
Uruguay	7
Samoa	38
5 March – BC Place
Kenya	24
Spain	14

9th Place Final
5 March – BC Place
Samoa	35
Kenya	17

Matches

Quarter-finals

4 March
00:00

Uruguay	14–7	Japan

BC Place, Vancouver

4 March
00:00

Samoa	28–12	Chile

BC Place, Vancouver

4 March
00:00

South Africa	12–17	Kenya

BC Place, Vancouver

4 March
00:00

Canada	14–19	Spain

BC Place, Vancouver

Semi-finals

5 March
00:00

Uruguay	7–38	Samoa

BC Place, Vancouver

5 March
00:00

Kenya	24–14	Spain

BC Place, Vancouver

9th place Final

5 March
00:00

Samoa	35–17	Kenya

BC Place, Vancouver

=== 5th–8th playoffs ===
5th place Semi-finals
5 March – BC Place
Great Britain	5
New Zealand	19
5 March – BC Place
Fiji	19
United States	24

5th place Final
5 March – BC Place
New Zealand	50
United States	7

Matches

Semi-finals

5 March
00:00

Great Britain	5–19	New Zealand

BC Place, Vancouver

5 March
00:00

Fiji	19–24	United States

BC Place, Vancouver

5th place Final

5 March
00:00

New Zealand	50–7	United States

BC Place, Vancouver

=== Cup playoffs ===
Quarterfinals
4 March – BC Place
Great Britain	7
France	15
4 March – BC Place
New Zealand	7
Australia	17
4 March – BC Place
Argentina	19
Fiji	14
4 March – BC Place
Ireland	15 (a.e.t.)
United States	10

Semifinals
5 March – BC Place
France	26
Australia	12
5 March – BC Place
Argentina	14
Ireland	7

Final
5 March – BC Place
France	21
Argentina	33
Bronze final
5 March – BC Place
Australia	20
Ireland	5

Matches

Quarter-finals

4 March
00:00

Great Britain	7–15	France

BC Place, Vancouver

4 March
00:00

New Zealand	7–17	Australia

BC Place, Vancouver

4 March
00:00

Argentina	19–14	Fiji

BC Place, Vancouver

4 March
00:00

Ireland	15 (a.e.t.)–10	United States

BC Place, Vancouver

Semi-finals

5 March
00:00

France	26–12	Australia

BC Place, Vancouver

5 March
00:00

Argentina	14–7	Ireland

BC Place, Vancouver

Bronze final

5 March
00:00

Australia	20–5	Ireland

BC Place, Vancouver

Cup Final

5 March
00:00

France	21–33	Argentina

BC Place, Vancouver

== Tournament placings ==
Place	Team	Points
1st place, gold medalist(s)	Argentina	22
2nd place, silver medalist(s)	France	19
3rd place, bronze medalist(s)	Australia	17
4	Ireland	15
5	New Zealand	13
6	United States	12
7	Fiji	10
7	Great Britain	10

Place	Team	Points
9	Samoa	8
10	Kenya	7
11	Spain	5
11	Uruguay	5
13	South Africa	4
14	Japan	3
15	Canada	1
15	Chile	1

Sevens Series XXIV
Preceded by 2023 USA Sevens	2023 USA Sevens	Succeeded by 2023 Hong Kong Sevens
Canada Sevens
Preceded by 2022 Canada Sevens	2023 Canada Sevens	Succeeded by 2024 Canada Sevens
