= 2023 New Zealand Sevens =

World Rugby Sevens Series tournament

- Sevens World Series XXIV
- Host nation: New Zealand
- Date: 21–22 January 2023

Cup
- Champion: Argentina
- Runner-up: New Zealand
- Third: United States

Tournament details
- Matches played: 45

The 2023 New Zealand Sevens was the fourth tournament within the 2022–23 World Rugby Sevens Series and 22nd edition of the New Zealand Sevens since it began in 2000. It was held on 21 and 22 January 2023 at FMG Stadium Waikato in Hamilton, New Zealand.

== Format ==
The 16 teams were drawn into four pools of four. Each team plays every other team in their pool once. The top two teams from each pool advance to the Cup playoffs and compete for gold, silver and bronze medals. The other teams from each pool go to the classification playoffs for 9th to 16th placings.

== Teams ==
Fifteen core teams participated in the tournament along with one invited team, Tonga.

Core Teams

- Argentina
- Australia
- Canada
- Fiji
- France
- Great Britain
- Ireland
- Japan
- Kenya
- New Zealand
- Samoa
- South Africa
- Spain
- United States
- Uruguay

Invited Team

- Tonga

== Pool stage ==
All times in New Zealand Standard Time (UTC+6:00)

Key to colours in group tables
Teams that advanced to the Cup Quarterfinal

=== Pool A ===
Pos	Team	Pld	W	D	L	PF	PA	PD	Pts
1	Fiji	3	3	0	0	69	29	+40	9
2	France	3	2	0	1	57	57	0	7
3	Samoa	3	1	0	2	53	48	5	5
4	Kenya	3	0	0	3	33	78	−45	3

21 January
00:00

Fiji	26–10	France

FMG Stadium Waikato, Hamilton

21 January
00:00

Samoa	31–5	Kenya

FMG Stadium Waikato, Hamilton

21 January
00:00

Fiji	21–7	Kenya

FMG Stadium Waikato, Hamilton

21 January
00:00

Samoa	10–21	France

FMG Stadium Waikato, Hamilton

21 January
00:00

Samoa	12–22	Fiji

FMG Stadium Waikato, Hamilton

21 January
00:00

France	26–21	Kenya

FMG Stadium Waikato, Hamilton

=== Pool B ===
Pos	Team	Pld	W	D	L	PF	PA	PD	Pts
1	New Zealand	3	3	0	0	85	31	+54	9
2	Australia	3	2	0	1	88	42	+46	7
3	Tonga	3	1	0	2	33	102	−69	5
4	Great Britain	3	0	0	3	47	78	−31	3

21 January
00:00

New Zealand	45–0	Tonga

FMG Stadium Waikato, Hamilton

21 January
00:00

Great Britain	14–33	Australia

FMG Stadium Waikato, Hamilton

21 January
00:00

Great Britain	21–26	Tonga

FMG Stadium Waikato, Hamilton

21 January
00:00

New Zealand	21–19	Australia

FMG Stadium Waikato, Hamilton

21 January
00:00

Australia	36–12	Tonga

FMG Stadium Waikato, Hamilton

21 January
00:00

New Zealand	19–12	Great Britain

FMG Stadium Waikato, Hamilton

=== Pool C ===
Pos	Team	Pld	W	D	L	PF	PA	PD	Pts
1	United States	3	2	1	0	82	38	+44	8
2	Ireland	3	2	1	0	61	38	+23	8
3	Japan	3	1	0	2	48	92	−44	5
4	Uruguay	3	0	0	3	43	66	−23	3

21 January
00:00

Uruguay	12–14	Ireland

FMG Stadium Waikato, Hamilton

21 January
00:00

United States	40–12	Japan

FMG Stadium Waikato, Hamilton

21 January
00:00

Uruguay	19–24	Japan

FMG Stadium Waikato, Hamilton

21 January
00:00

United States	14–14	Ireland

FMG Stadium Waikato, Hamilton

21 January
00:00

United States	28–12	Uruguay

FMG Stadium Waikato, Hamilton

21 January
00:00

Ireland	33–12	Japan

FMG Stadium Waikato, Hamilton

=== Pool D ===
Pos	Team	Pld	W	D	L	PF	PA	PD	Pts
1	South Africa	3	3	0	0	70	31	+39	9
2	Argentina	3	2	0	1	63	36	+27	7
3	Canada	3	1	0	2	31	68	−37	5
4	Spain	3	0	0	3	22	51	−29	3

21 January
00:00

South Africa	34–5	Canada

FMG Stadium Waikato, Hamilton

21 January
00:00

Argentina	20–5	Spain

FMG Stadium Waikato, Hamilton

21 January
00:00

Argentina	29–14	Canada

FMG Stadium Waikato, Hamilton

21 January
00:00

South Africa	19–12	Spain

FMG Stadium Waikato, Hamilton

21 January
00:00

South Africa	17–14	Argentina

FMG Stadium Waikato, Hamilton

21 January
00:00

Spain	5–12	Canada

FMG Stadium Waikato, Hamilton

== Placement matches ==
=== Thirteenth place ===
13th place semifinal
22 January – FMG Stadium Waikato
Canada	21
Uruguay	17
22 January – FMG Stadium Waikato
Spain	21
Japan	17

13th place final
22 January – FMG Stadium Waikato
Canada	14
Spain	24

=== Ninth place ===
9th place Quarterfinals
22 January – FMG Stadium Waikato
Canada	5
Kenya	21
22 January – FMG Stadium Waikato
Tonga	12
Uruguay	7
22 January – FMG Stadium Waikato
Samoa	24
Spain	19
22 January – FMG Stadium Waikato
Japan	12
Great Britain	24

9th place Semifinals
22 January – FMG Stadium Waikato
Kenya	33
Tonga	19
22 January – FMG Stadium Waikato
Samoa	24
Great Britain	14

9th place Final
22 January – FMG Stadium Waikato
Kenya	5
Samoa	26

== Cup ==
=== 5th to 8th playoffs ===
9th place semifinal
22 January – FMG Stadium Waikato
South Africa	14
Ireland	21
22 January – FMG Stadium Waikato
Fiji	19
Australia	26

9th place finals
22 January – FMG Stadium Waikato
Ireland	17
Australia	26

=== Cup playoffs ===
Quarterfinals
22 January – FMG Stadium Waikato
South Africa	17
France	22
22 January – FMG Stadium Waikato]
New Zealand	10
Ireland	5
22 January – FMG Stadium Waikato
United States	28
Australia	14
22 January – FMG Stadium Waikato
Fiji	10
Argentina	19

Semifinals
22 January – FMG Stadium Waikato
France	0
New Zealand	38
22 January – FMG Stadium Waikato
Argentina	24
United States	14

Final
22 January – FMG Stadium Waikato
New Zealand	12
Argentina	14
Bronze final
22 January – FMG Stadium Waikato
France	14
United States	15

== Tournament placings ==
Place	Team	Points
1st place, gold medalist(s)	New Zealand	22
2nd place, silver medalist(s)	Argentina	19
3rd place, bronze medalist(s)	United States	17
4	France	15
5	Australia	13
6	Ireland	12
7	South Africa	10
7	Fiji	10

Place	Team	Points
9	Samoa	8
10	Kenya	7
11	Great Britain	5
11	Tonga	5
13	Spain	3
14	Canada	2
15	Uruguay	1
15	Japan	1

Source: World Rugby

== Players ==
Dream Team
Forwards	Backs
(Argentina) Rodrigo Isgró (Argentina) Agustín Fraga (New Zealand) Sam Dickson	(Argentina) Marcos Moneta (Fiji) Manueli Maisamoa; Roderick Solo (New Zealand) Akuila Rokolisoa

== See also ==
- 2023 New Zealand Women's Sevens
- World Rugby Sevens Series
- 2022–23 World Rugby Sevens Series

World Sevens Series XXIV
Preceded by 2022 South Africa	2023 New Zealand Sevens	Succeeded by 2023 Sydney Sevens
New Zealand Sevens
Preceded by 2020 New Zealand Sevens	2023 New Zealand Sevens	Succeeded by None last tournament
