= 2022 Dubai Sevens =

World Rugby Sevens Series tournament

- Sevens World Series XXIV
- Host nation: UAE
- Date: 2–4 December 2022

Cup
- Champion: South Africa
- Runner-up: Ireland
- Third: New Zealand

Tournament details
- Matches played: 45

The 2022 Dubai Sevens was the second tournament within the 2022–23 World Rugby Sevens Series and was the 22nd international edition and the 52nd overall of the Dubai Sevens since it began in 1970. It was held on 2, 3 and 4 December 2022 at The Sevens Stadium in Dubai, United Arab Emirates.

== Format ==
The twelve teams at each tournament were drawn into three pools of four teams each. A round-robin was held for each pool, where every team played each of the other three in their pool once. The top two teams from each pool, plus the two best third-placed on comparative pool standings, advanced to the Cup quarterfinals to compete for tournament honours. The other teams from each pool went to the challenge playoffs for ninth to twelfth place.

== Teams ==
Fifteen core teams participated in the tournament along with one invited team, Uganda.

Core Teams

- Argentina
- Australia
- Canada
- Fiji
- France
- Great Britain
- Ireland
- Japan
- Kenya
- New Zealand
- Samoa
- South Africa
- Spain
- United States
- Uruguay

Invited Team

- Uganda

== Pool stage ==
All times in UAE Standard Time (UTC+4:00)

Key to colours in group tables
Teams that advanced to the Cup Quarterfinal

=== Pool A ===
Team	Pld	W	D	L	PD	Pts
South Africa	3	2	0	1	13	7
Australia	3	1	1	1	2	6
Great Britain	3	1	1	1	0	6
Kenya	3	0	2	1	–15	5

2 December
00:00

South Africa	5–14	Great Britain

The Sevens Stadium, Dubai

2 December
00:00

Australia	19–19	Kenya

The Sevens Stadium, Dubai

3 December
00:00

Kenya	12–27	South Africa

The Sevens Stadium, Dubai

3 December
00:00

Great Britain	19–28	Australia

The Sevens Stadium, Dubai

3 December
00:00

Kenya	14–14	Great Britain

The Sevens Stadium, Dubai

3 December
00:00

South Africa	19–12	Australia

The Sevens Stadium, Dubai

=== Pool B ===
Team	Pld	W	D	L	PD	Pts
Argentina	3	2	0	1	47	7
New Zealand	3	2	0	1	44	7
Fiji	3	2	0	1	40	7
Uruguay	3	0	0	3	-131	3

2 December
00:00

Argentina	31–28	New Zealand

The Sevens Stadium, Dubai

2 December
00:00

Fiji	52–0	Uruguay

The Sevens Stadium, Dubai

3 December
00:00

Uruguay	0–49	Argentina

The Sevens Stadium, Dubai

3 December
00:00

New Zealand	24–7	Fiji

The Sevens Stadium, Dubai

3 December
00:00

Uruguay	5–35	New Zealand

The Sevens Stadium, Dubai

3 December
00:00

Argentina	12–17	Fiji

The Sevens Stadium, Dubai

=== Pool C ===
Team	Pld	W	D	L	PD	Pts
France	3	3	0	0	24	9
Ireland	3	1	1	1	11	6
Spain	3	1	1	1	7	6
Uganda	3	0	0	3	-42	3

2 December
00:00

Ireland	21–21	Spain

The Sevens Stadium, Dubai

2 December
00:00

France	10–7	Uganda

The Sevens Stadium, Dubai

3 December
00:00

Uganda	15–33	Ireland

The Sevens Stadium, Dubai

3 December
00:00

Spain	10–24	France

The Sevens Stadium, Dubai

3 December
00:00

Uganda	5–26	Spain

The Sevens Stadium, Dubai

3 December
00:00

Ireland	7–14	France

The Sevens Stadium, Dubai

=== Pool D ===
Team	Pld	W	D	L	PD	Pts
United States	3	3	0	0	43	9
Samoa	3	2	0	1	47	3
Canada	3	1	0	2	-19	5
Japan	3	0	0	3	-71	3

2 December
00:00

United States	19–14	Canada

The Sevens Stadium, Dubai

2 December
00:00

Samoa	38–12	Japan

The Sevens Stadium, Dubai

3 December
00:00

Japan	7–43	United States

The Sevens Stadium, Dubai

3 December
00:00

Canada	5–33	Samoa

The Sevens Stadium, Dubai

3 December
00:00

Japan	14–28	Canada

The Sevens Stadium, Dubai

3 December
00:00

United States	14–12	Samoa

The Sevens Stadium, Dubai

== Placement matches ==
=== Thirteenth place ===
13th place semifinal
4 December – The Sevens Stadium
Uganda	0
Canada	29
4 December – The Sevens Stadium
Spain	28
Japan	0

13th place final
4 December – The Sevens Stadium
Canada	7
Spain	38

=== Ninth place ===
9th place Quarterfinals
3 December – The Sevens Stadium
Fiji	29
Uganda	14
3 December – The Sevens Stadium
Canada	7
Kenya	17
3 December – The Sevens Stadium
Spain	12
Uruguay	24
3 December – The Sevens Stadium
Great Britain	45
Japan	5

9th place Semifinals
4 December – The Sevens Stadium
Fiji	21
Kenya	17
4 December – The Sevens Stadium
Uruguay	26
Great Britain	7

9th place Final
4 December – The Sevens Stadium
Fiji	47
Uruguay	0

== Cup ==
=== 5th to 8th playoffs ===
9th place semifinal
4 December – The Sevens Stadium
Argentina	28
Australia	15
4 December – The Sevens Stadium
France	24
Samoa	17

9th place finals
4 December – The Sevens Stadium
Argentina	12
France	19

=== Cup playoffs ===
Quarterfinals
3 December – The Sevens Stadium
Argentina	14
Ireland	19
3 December – The Sevens Stadium
United States	24
Australia	19
3 December – The Sevens Stadium
France	0
New Zealand	20
3 December – The Sevens Stadium
South Africa	24
Samoa	19

Semifinals
4 December – The Sevens Stadium
Ireland	12
United States	7
4 December – The Sevens Stadium
New Zealand	19
South Africa	26

Final
4 December – The Sevens Stadium
Ireland	5
South Africa	21
3rd place final
4 December – The Sevens Stadium
United States	12
New Zealand	31

== Tournament placings ==
Place	Team	Points
1st place, gold medalist(s)	South Africa	22
2nd place, silver medalist(s)	Ireland	19
3rd place, bronze medalist(s)	New Zealand	17
4	United States	15
5	France	13
6	Argentina	12
7	Australia	10
7	Samoa	10

Place	Team	Points
9	Fiji	8
10	Uruguay	7
11	Great Britain	5
11	Kenya	5
13	Spain	4
14	Canada	3
15	Japan	1
15	Uganda	1

Source: World Rugby

== Players ==
Dream Team
Forwards	Backs
(South Africa) Ricardo Duarttee (South Africa) Branco du Preez (South Africa) Siviwe Soyizwapi	(United States) Perry Baker (Ireland) Harry McNulty (Ireland) Mark Roche; Akuila Rokolisoa

== See also ==
- 2022 Dubai Women's Sevens
- World Rugby Sevens Series
- 2022–23 World Rugby Sevens Series

World Sevens Series XXIV
Preceded by 2022 Hong Kong Sevens	2022 Dubai Sevens	Succeeded by 2022 South Africa Sevens
Dubai Sevens
Preceded by 2021 Dubai Sevens	2022 Dubai Sevens	Succeeded by 2023 Dubai Sevens
