= 2023 USA Sevens =

Rugby sevens tournament

- Sevens World Series XXIII
- Host nation: United States
- Date: 25–26 February 2023

Cup
- Champion: New Zealand
- Runner-up: Argentina
- Third: Fiji

Tournament details
- Matches played: 45

The 2023 USA Sevens was the eighteenth edition of the rugby sevens tournament. It was held at Dignity Health Sports Park in Carson, Los Angeles, California between 25 and 26 February 2023. The title defenders were three-time USA Sevens champions New Zealand.

The tournament was won by New Zealand, who successfully defended their 2022 title.

== Format ==
The sixteen teams were drawn into four pools of four. Each team played the three opponents in their pool once. The top two teams from each pool advanced to the Cup bracket, with the losers of the quarter-finals vying for a fifth-place finish. The remaining eight teams that finished third or fourth in their pool played off for 9th place, with the losers of the 9th-place quarter-finals competing for 13th place.

== Teams ==
The sixteen national teams competing in Los Angeles were:

Core Teams

- Argentina
- Australia
- Canada
- Fiji
- France
- Great Britain
- Ireland
- Japan
- Kenya
- New Zealand
- Samoa
- South Africa
- Spain
- United States
- Uruguay

Invited Team

- Chile

== Pool stage ==
Teams were awarded 3 points for a win, 2 points for a draw and 1 point for a loss. No bonus points were awarded.

Key to colours in group tables
Teams that advanced to the Cup quarterfinals
Teams that advanced to the 9th place quarterfinals

=== Pool A ===
Pos	Team	W	W	D	L	PF	PA	PD	Pts
1	Samoa	3	3	0	0	71	31	+40	9
2	New Zealand	3	2	0	1	69	36	+33	7
3	United States	3	1	0	2	54	79	–25	5
4	Chile	3	0	0	3	29	77	–48	3

25 February

Samoa	26–19	United States

Dignity Health Sports Park

25 February

New Zealand	26–7	Chile

Dignity Health Sports Park

25 February

Samoa	31–5	Chile

Dignity Health Sports Park

25 February

New Zealand	36–15	United States

Dignity Health Sports Park

25 February

United States	20–17	Chile

Dignity Health Sports Park

25 February

New Zealand	7–14	Samoa

Dignity Health Sports Park

=== Pool B ===
Pos	Team	Pld	W	D	L	PF	PA	PD	Pts
1	Ireland	3	3	0	0	43	5	+38	9
2	South Africa	3	1	0	2	22	24	–2	5
3	Canada	3	1	0	2	26	44	–18	5
4	Uruguay	3	1	0	2	20	38	–18	5

25 February

Ireland	7–0	Uruguay

Dignity Health Sports Park

25 February

South Africa	12–0	Canada

Dignity Health Sports Park

25 February

Ireland	22–0	Canada

Dignity Health Sports Park

25 February

South Africa	5–10	Uruguay

Dignity Health Sports Park

25 February

Uruguay	10–26	Canada

Dignity Health Sports Park

25 February

South Africa	5–14	Ireland

Dignity Health Sports Park

=== Pool C ===
Pos	Team	Pld	W	D	L	PF	PA	PD	Pts
1	Fiji	3	3	0	0	84	17	+67	9
2	Australia	3	1	0	2	63	37	+6	5
3	Kenya	3	1	0	2	22	33	–11	5
4	Japan	3	1	0	2	17	79	–62	5

25 February

Australia	7–12	Kenya

Dignity Health Sports Park

25 February

Fiji	50–0	Japan

Dignity Health Sports Park

25 February

Australia	24–10	Japan

Dignity Health Sports Park

25 February

Fiji	19–5	Kenya

Dignity Health Sports Park

25 February

Kenya	5–7	Japan

Dignity Health Sports Park

25 February

Fiji	15–12	Australia

Dignity Health Sports Park

=== Pool D ===
Pos	Team	Pld	W	D	L	PF	PA	PD	Pts
1	Great Britain	3	3	0	0	52	36	+16	9
2	Argentina	3	2	0	1	41	26	+15	7
3	France	3	1	0	2	45	45	0	5
4	Spain	3	0	0	3	31	62	–31	3

25 February

Great Britain	7–5	Argentina

Dignity Health Sports Park

25 February

France	19–7	Spain

Dignity Health Sports Park

25 February

Great Britain	24–17	Spain

Dignity Health Sports Park

25 February

France	12–17	Argentina

Dignity Health Sports Park

25 February

Argentina	19–7	Spain

Dignity Health Sports Park

25 February

France	14–21	Great Britain

Dignity Health Sports Park

== Knockout stage ==
=== 13th–16th playoffs ===
13th place Semi-finals
26 February – Dignity Health Sports Park
United States	26
Kenya	21
26 February – Dignity Health Sports Park
Chile	19
Japan	24

13th place Final
26 February – Dignity Health Sports Park
United States	31
Japan	7

Matches

Semi-finals

26 February

United States	26–21	Kenya

Dignity Health Sports Park

26 February

Chile	19–24	Japan

Dignity Health Sports Park

13th place Final

26 February

United States	31–7	Japan

Dignity Health Sports Park

=== 9th–12th playoffs ===
Quarter-finals
26 February – Dignity Health Sports Park
United States	12
Spain	14
26 February – Dignity Health Sports Park
Kenya	5
Canada	12
26 February – Dignity Health Sports Park
France	12
Chile	5
26 February – Dignity Health Sports Park
Uruguay	19
Japan	7

Semi-finals
26 February – Dignity Health Sports Park
Spain	17
Canada	12
26 February – Dignity Health Sports Park
France	31
Uruguay	5

9th Place Final
26 February – Dignity Health Sports Park
Spain	24
France	26

Matches

Quarter-finals

26 February

United States	12–14	Spain

Dignity Health Sports Park

26 February

Kenya	5–12	Canada

Dignity Health Sports Park

26 February

France	12–5	Chile

Dignity Health Sports Park

26 February

Uruguay	19–7	Japan

Dignity Health Sports Park

Semi-finals

26 February

Spain	17–12	Canada

Dignity Health Sports Park

26 February

France	31–5	Uruguay

Dignity Health Sports Park

9th place Final

26 February

Spain	24–26	France

Dignity Health Sports Park

=== 5th–8th playoffs ===
5th place Semi-finals
26 February – Dignity Health Sports Park
Samoa	45
South Africa	5
26 February – Dignity Health Sports Park
Great Britain	12
Ireland	5

5th place Final
26 February – Dignity Health Sports Park
Samoa	24
Great Britain	19

Matches

Semi-finals

26 February

Samoa	45-5	South Africa

Dignity Health Sports Park

26 February

Great Britain	12–5	Ireland

Dignity Health Sports Park

5th place Final

26 February

Samoa	24–19	Great Britain

Dignity Health Sports Park

=== Cup playoffs ===
Quarterfinals
26 February – Dignity Health Sports Park
Samoa	12
Argentina	19
26 February – Dignity Health Sports Park
Fiji	28
South Africa	7
26 February – Dignity Health Sports Park
Great Britain	12
New Zealand	24
26 February – Dignity Health Sports Park
Ireland	7
Australia	31

Semifinals
26 February – Dignity Health Sports Park
Argentina	20
Fiji	17
26 February – Dignity Health Sports Park
New Zealand	33
Australia	17

Final
26 February – Dignity Health Sports Park
Argentina	12
New Zealand	22
3rd place final
26 February – Dignity Health Sports Park
Fiji	21
Australia	19

Matches

Quarter-finals

26 February

Samoa	12–19	Argentina

Dignity Health Sports Park

26 February

Fiji	28–7	South Africa

Dignity Health Sports Park

26 February

Great Britain	12–24	New Zealand

Dignity Health Sports Park

26 February

Ireland	7–31	Australia

Dignity Health Sports Park

Semi-finals

26 February

Argentina	20–17	Fiji

Dignity Health Sports Park

26 February

New Zealand	33–17	Australia

Dignity Health Sports Park

Third place

26 February

Fiji	21–19	Australia

Dignity Health Sports Park

Cup Final

26 February

Argentina	12–22	New Zealand
	Report

Dignity Health Sports Park

== Tournament placings ==
Place	Team	Points
1st place, gold medalist(s)	New Zealand	22
2nd place, silver medalist(s)	Argentina	19
3rd place, bronze medalist(s)	Fiji	17
4	Australia	15
5	Samoa	13
6	Great Britain	12
7	Ireland	10
7	South Africa	10

Place	Team	Points
9	France	8
10	Spain	7
11	Canada	5
11	Uruguay	5
13	United States	4
14	Japan	3
15	Kenya	1
15	Chile	1

Sevens Series XXIV
Preceded by 2023 Sydney Sevens	2023 USA Sevens	Succeeded by 2023 Canada Sevens
USA Sevens
Preceded by 2022 USA Sevens	2023 USA Sevens	Succeeded by 2024 USA Sevens
