= 2023 London Sevens =

Rugby sevens tournament

- Sevens World Series XXIV
- Host nation: (United Kingdom) Great Britain
- Date: 20–21 May 2023

Cup
- Champion: Argentina
- Runner-up: Fiji
- Third: Samoa

Play-off for core status
- Winner: Canada

Tournament details
- Matches played: 41
- Tries scored: 1659 (average 40.46 per match)
- Most points: Va'a Apelu Maliko (57 pts)
- Most tries: Va'a Apelu Maliko (11 tries)

The 2023 London Sevens was the final event of the 2022–23 World Rugby Sevens Series and the twenty-first edition of the London Sevens. It was held at Twickenham Stadium, London on 20–21 May 2023.

Argentina won the Cup final, their third tournament victory for the season, by defeating Fiji 35–14.

The competition format used in London was different to all previous events in the season as only twelve teams instead of sixteen were eligible to compete for the tournament cup. The other four teams competed for the one remaining core team berth for the 2023–24 World Rugby Sevens Series with the unsuccessful sides losing core team status.

Canada won the play-off to retain core team status for 2023–24, defeating Kenya by 12–7.

== Format ==
The twelve teams in the cup competition for the London Sevens were drawn into three pools of four. Each team played the three opponents in their pool once. The top two teams from each pool advanced to the Cup bracket, with the two best third-placed teams also advancing. The remaining four teams played off for a 9th–12th placing.

The four teams competing for core status in the 2023–24 season were drawn into a separate round-robin playoff pool. The top two teams from that pool then advanced to a final match to determine the last core team berth.

== Teams ==
The twelve teams that participated in the main tournament at London were:

- Argentina
- Australia
- Fiji
- France
- Great Britain
- Ireland
- Japan
- New Zealand
- Samoa
- South Africa
- Spain
- United States

The four teams that participated in the play-offs for 2023–24 core team status were:

- Canada
- Kenya
- Tonga
- Uruguay

Tonga gained entry to the London Sevens core team qualifier for the 2023–24 season by winning the 2023 Challenger Series. The other three sides were the core teams ranked 12th to 14th after Round 10 in the 2022–23 series.

Japan, as the 15th ranked core team after Round 10 in the 2022–23 series, was relegated for the 2023–24 series but was still invited to play in the main tournament at the 2023 London Sevens.

== Pool stage ==
All times in British Summer Time (UTC+01:00). All matches played at Twickenham Stadium unless specifically noted otherwise.

Teams were awarded 3 points for a win, 2 points for a draw and 1 point for a loss. No bonus points were awarded.

Key to colours in group tables
Teams that advanced to the Cup quarterfinals
Teams that advanced to the 5th place semifinals

=== Pool A ===
Pos	Team	Pld	W	D	L	PF	PA	PD	Pts
1	New Zealand	3	3	0	0	87	43	+44	9
2	Great Britain	3	2	0	1	45	54	−9	7
3	South Africa	3	0	1	2	62	77	−15	4
4	United States	3	0	1	2	62	82	−20	4

20 May
00:00

South Africa	15–19	Great Britain

Twickenham Stadium, London

20 May
00:00

New Zealand	35–17	United States

Twickenham Stadium, London

20 May
00:00

United States	26–26	South Africa

Twickenham Stadium, London

20 May
00:00

Great Britain	5–20	New Zealand

Twickenham Stadium, London

20 May
00:00

United States	19–21	Great Britain

Twickenham Stadium, London

20 May
00:00

South Africa	21–32	New Zealand

Twickenham Stadium, London

=== Pool B ===
Pos	Team	Pld	W	D	L	PF	PA	PD	Pts
1	Argentina	3	2	0	1	95	38	+57	7
2	Fiji	3	2	0	1	99	59	+40	7
3	Ireland	3	2	0	1	66	52	+14	7
4	Japan	3	0	0	3	26	137	−111	3

20 May
00:00

Ireland	21–33	Fiji

Twickenham Stadium, London

20 May
00:00

Argentina	43–12	Japan

Twickenham Stadium, London

20 May
00:00

Japan	7–40	Ireland

Twickenham Stadium, London

20 May
00:00

Fiji	12–40	Argentina

Twickenham Stadium, London

20 May
00:00

Japan	7–54	Fiji

Twickenham Stadium, London

20 May
00:00

Ireland	14–12	Argentina

Twickenham Stadium, London

=== Pool C ===
Pos	Team	Pld	W	D	L	PF	PA	PD	Pts
1	Samoa	3	3	0	0	92	52	+40	9
2	Australia	3	2	0	1	73	48	+25	7
3	France	3	1	0	2	68	75	−7	5
4	Spain	3	0	0	3	50	108	−58	3

20 May
00:00

Australia	33–12	Spain

Twickenham Stadium, London

20 May
00:00

France	21–28	Samoa

Twickenham Stadium, London

20 May
00:00

Samoa	24–14	Australia

Twickenham Stadium, London

20 May
00:00

Spain	21–35	France

Twickenham Stadium, London

20 May
00:00

Samoa	40–17	Spain

Twickenham Stadium, London

20 May
00:00

Australia	26–12	France

Twickenham Stadium, London

=== Pool play-off ===
Key to colours in Pool play-off table
Teams that advanced to the Play-off final for core status
Teams that are eliminated from the play-off tournament

Pool play-off table
Pos	Team	Pld	W	D	L	PF	PA	PD	Pts
1	Canada	3	2	0	1	83	50	+33	7
2	Kenya	3	2	0	1	72	59	+13	7
3	Uruguay	3	2	0	1	48	43	+5	7
4	Tonga	3	0	0	3	45	96	–51	2

20 May
00:00

Kenya	24–19	Canada

Twickenham Stadium, London

20 May
00:00

Uruguay	15–12	Tonga

Twickenham Stadium, London

20 May
00:00

Tonga	26–38	Kenya

Twickenham Stadium, London

20 May
00:00

Canada	21–19	Uruguay

Twickenham Stadium, London

20 May
00:00

Tonga	7–43	Canada

Twickenham Stadium, London

20 May
00:00

Kenya	14–10	Uruguay

Twickenham Stadium, London

== Knockout stage ==
All times are British Summer Time (UTC+01:00).

=== Play-off final for core status ===
All matches played on 21 May 2023 at Twickenham Stadium unless specifically noted otherwise.

Play-off final for core status
4:56 pm
Canada	12
Kenya	7

=== 9th–12th bracket ===
All matches played on 21 May 2023 at Twickenham Stadium unless specifically noted otherwise.

9th place semifinal
11:13 am
South Africa	29
Japan	7
11:35 am
United States	24
Spain	0

9th place final
3:08 pm
South Africa	47
United States	5
11th place final
2:46 pm
Japan	12
Spain	28

=== 5th–8th bracket ===
All matches played on 21 May 2023 at Twickenham Stadium unless specifically noted otherwise.

5th place semifinal
12:49 pm
Ireland	19
Great Britain	12
1:11 pm
Australia	19
France	22

5th place final
4:07 pm
Ireland	12
France	21
7th place final
3:30 pm
Great Britain	5
Australia	34

=== Cup bracket ===
All matches played on 21 May 2023 at Twickenham Stadium unless specifically noted otherwise.

Quarter-finals
9:45 am
Argentina	28
Ireland	14
10:07 am
Samoa	12
Great Britain	5
10:29 am
Fiji	19
Australia	5
10:51 am
New Zealand	19
France	17

Semi-finals
1:33 pm
Argentina	10
Samoa	7
1:55 pm
Fiji	19
New Zealand	17

Cup final
5:26 pm
Argentina	35
Fiji	14
Bronze final
4:29 pm
Samoa	24
New Zealand	19

=== Placings ===
Place	Team	Points
1st place, gold medalist(s)	Argentina	20
2nd place, silver medalist(s)	Fiji	18
3rd place, bronze medalist(s)	Samoa	16
4	New Zealand	14
5	France	12
6	Ireland	10

Place	Team	Points
7	Australia	8
8	Great Britain	6
9	South Africa	4
10	United States	3
11	Spain	2
12	Japan	0

World Sevens Series XXIV
Preceded by 2023 France Sevens	2023 London Sevens	Succeeded by None (last event)
London Sevens
Preceded by 2022 London Sevens	2023 London Sevens	Succeeded by
