= 2023 Hong Kong Sevens =

Rugby sevens tournament

- Sevens World Series XXIV
- Host nation: Hong Kong
- Date: 31 March–2 April 2023

Cup
- Champion: New Zealand
- Runner-up: Fiji
- Third: France

Tournament details
- Matches played: 45

The 2023 Hong Kong Sevens was a rugby sevens tournament that took place at the Hong Kong Stadium from 31 March–2 April 2023. It was the 46th edition of the Hong Kong Sevens, and the eighth tournament of the 2022–23 World Rugby Sevens Series. Sixteen teams competed in the tournament.

New Zealand were the champions after beating Fiji in the cup final.

== Background ==
The 2022 Hong Kong Sevens is the eighth round of eleven in the 2022–23 season

== Teams ==
Sixteen teams competed in the tournament. Fifteen core teams and one invited team.

Core Teams
- Argentina
- Australia
- Canada
- Fiji
- France
- Great Britain
- Ireland
- Japan
- Kenya
- New Zealand
- Samoa
- South Africa
- Spain
- United States
- Uruguay

Invited Team

- Hong Kong

== Format ==
The teams were divided into pools of four teams, who played a round-robin within the pool. Points were awarded in each pool on the standard schedule for rugby sevens tournaments (though different from the standard in the 15-man game)—3 for a win, 2 for a draw, 1 for a loss. The draw consists of sixteen teams with fifteen of them being core teams that compete in each series event, plus an invitational team. These teams competed in Pools A, B, C, and D. The winners and runners-up from each pool in the main draw qualified for the Cup quarterfinals. The losers of these quarterfinals competed in the placement matches.

== Pool stage ==
Teams were awarded 3 points for a win, 2 points for a draw and 1 point for a loss. No bonus points were awarded.

Key to colours in group tables
Teams that advanced to the Cup quarterfinals
Teams that advanced to the 9th place quarterfinals

=== Pool A ===
Pos	Team	Pld	W	D	L	PF	PA	PD	Pts
1	Fiji	3	3	0	0	80	33	+47	9
2	Argentina	3	2	0	1	62	52	+10	7
3	Samoa	3	1	0	2	55	43	+12	5
4	Canada	3	0	0	3	19	88	–69	3

31 March
00:00

Fiji	12–7	Samoa

Hong Kong Stadium, Hong Kong

31 March
00:00

Argentina	17–7	Canada

Hong Kong Stadium, Hong Kong

1 April
00:00

Fiji	42–7	Canada

Hong Kong Stadium, Hong Kong

1 April
00:00

Argentina	26–19	Samoa

Hong Kong Stadium, Hong Kong

1 April
00:00

Samoa	29–5	Canada

Hong Kong Stadium, Hong Kong

1 April
00:00

Argentina	19–26	Fiji

Hong Kong Stadium, Hong Kong

=== Pool B ===
Pos	Team	Pld	W	D	L	PF	PA	PD	Pts
1	France	3	3	0	0	55	40	+15	9
2	Great Britain	3	3	0	0	61	41	+20	7
3	Uruguay	3	1	0	2	50	45	+5	5
4	Hong Kong	3	1	0	2	38	78	–40	3

31 March
00:00

Great Britain	14–12	Uruguay

Hong Kong Stadium, Hong Kong

31 March
00:00

France	21–12	Hong Kong

Hong Kong Stadium, Hong Kong

1 April
00:00

Great Britain	33–12	Hong Kong

Hong Kong Stadium, Hong Kong

1 April
00:00

France	17–14	Uruguay

Hong Kong Stadium, Hong Kong

1 April
00:00

Uruguay	24–14	Hong Kong

Hong Kong Stadium, Hong Kong

1 April
00:00

France	17–14	Great Britain

Hong Kong Stadium, Hong Kong

=== Pool C ===
Pos	Team	Pld	W	D	L	PF	PA	PD	Pts
1	United States	3	2	0	1	55	12	+43	7
2	Spain	3	2	0	1	45	19	+26	7
3	Australia	3	2	0	1	43	36	+7	7
4	Japan	3	0	0	3	12	88	–76	3

31 March
00:00

United States	0–7	Spain

Hong Kong Stadium, Hong Kong

31 March
00:00

Australia	26–5	Japan

Hong Kong Stadium, Hong Kong

1 April
00:00

United States	31–0	Japan

Hong Kong Stadium, Hong Kong

1 April
00:00

Australia	12–0	Spain

Hong Kong Stadium, Hong Kong

1 April
00:00

Spain	31–7	Japan

Hong Kong Stadium, Hong Kong

1 April
00:00

Australia	5–24	United States

Hong Kong Stadium, Hong Kong

=== Pool D ===
Pos	Team	Pld	W	D	L	PF	PA	PD	Pts
1	New Zealand	3	3	0	0	67	19	+48	9
2	South Africa	3	2	0	1	47	36	+11	6
3	Ireland	3	1	0	2	40	54	–14	6
4	Kenya	3	0	0	3	36	81	–45	3

31 March
00:00

New Zealand	29–5	Kenya

Hong Kong Stadium, Hong Kong

31 March
00:00

Ireland	7–14	South Africa

Hong Kong Stadium, Hong Kong

1 April
00:00

New Zealand	12–7	South Africa

Hong Kong Stadium, Hong Kong

1 April
00:00

Ireland	26–14	Kenya

Hong Kong Stadium, Hong Kong

1 April
00:00

Kenya	17–26	South Africa

Hong Kong Stadium, Hong Kong

1 April
00:00

Ireland	7–26	New Zealand

Hong Kong Stadium, Hong Kong

== Placement matches ==
=== Thirteenth place ===
13th place semifinal
2 April 2023– Hong Kong Stadium
Canada	19
Japan	12
2 April 2023– Hong Kong Stadium
Kenya	10
Hong Kong	19

13th place final
2 April 2023– Hong Kong Stadium
Canada	7
Hong Kong	17

=== Ninth place ===
9th place Quarterfinals
2 April 2023– Hong Kong Stadium
Ireland	17
Canada	0
2 April 2023– Hong Kong Stadium
Uruguay	40
Japan	0
2 April 2023– Hong Kong Stadium
Samoa	26
Kenya	12
2 April 2023– Hong Kong Stadium
Australia	22
Hong Kong	5

9th place Semifinals
2 April 2023– Hong Kong Stadium
Ireland	31
Uruguay	7
2 April 2023– Hong Kong Stadium
Samoa	15
Australia	12

9th place Final
2 April 2023– Hong Kong Stadium
Ireland	19
Samoa	17

== Cup ==
=== 5th to 8th place ===
5th place semifinal
2 April 2023– Hong Kong Stadium
Argentina	19
Spain	0
2 April 2023– Hong Kong Stadium
South Africa	38
United States	7

5th place final
2 April 2023– Hong Kong Stadium
Argentina	7
South Africa	5

=== Cup playoffs ===
Cup quarterfinals
2 April 2023– Hong Kong Stadium
New Zealand	24
Argentina	10
2 April 2023– Hong Kong Stadium
France	19
Spain	14
2 April 2023– Hong Kong Stadium
Fiji	10
South Africa	7
2 April 2023– Hong Kong Stadium
United States	10
Great Britain	21

Cup semifinals
2 April 2023– Hong Kong Stadium
New Zealand	7
France	19
2 April 2023– Hong Kong Stadium
Fiji	10
Great Britain	7

Cup final
2 April 2023– Hong Kong Stadium
New Zealand	17
Fiji	20
Bronze final
2 April 2023– Hong Kong Stadium
France	17
Great Britain	19

=== Tournament placings ===
Place	Team	Points
1st place, gold medalist(s)	New Zealand	22
2nd place, silver medalist(s)	Fiji	19
3rd place, bronze medalist(s)	France	17
4	Great Britain	15
5	Argentina	13
6	South Africa	12
7	Spain	10
7	United States	10

Place	Team	Points
9	Ireland	8
10	Samoa	7
11	Australia	5
11	Uruguay	5
13	Hong Kong	3
14	Canada	2
15	Kenya	1
15	Japan	1

Source: World Rugby

=== Players ===
==== Dream team ====
The following seven players were selected to the tournament dream team at the conclusion of the tournament

(Fiji) Pilipo Bukayaro
(New Zealand) Leroy Carter
(Argentina) Luciano González
(Spain) Eduardo Lopez
(New Zealand) Brady Rush
(Fiji) Joseva Talacolo
(New Zealand) Kitioni Vai

== See also ==
World Sevens Series XXIV
Preceded by 2023 Canada Sevens	2023 Hong Kong Sevens	Succeeded by 2023 Singapore Sevens
Hong Kong Sevens
Preceded by 2019 Hong Kong Sevens	2023 Hong Kong Sevens	Succeeded by 2024 Hong Kong Sevens
