= Tawfik Bagalana =

Rugby union career
- Position: Inside centre
- Current team: Leicester Forest RFC
National sevens team
Years	Team	Comps
2022	Uganda 7s	

Tawfik Bagalana (born in 1999) is a Ugandan rugby union player who plays as an inside centre for Leicester Forest RFC in England. Tawfik was born to a cricketing father, Suleiman Bagalana and Tawfik began playing golf at age 7 at Jinja Golf Club, alongside rugby through his youth. Tawfik Bagalana was named in Uganda's provisional squad for the 2022 Rugby Africa Cup.

== Club career ==
Bagalana began playing rugby at Dam Waters in Jinja in 2007, later joining Jinja Hippos RFC in 2014 where he became captain before moving to Leicester Forest RFC in 2023.

== International career ==
2022 Africa Cup Training Squad: Tawfik was named in Uganda's extended training squad for the 2022 Rugby Africa Cup.

2023 African Scorpions Tour: Tawfik played for the African Scorpions, an invitational team, in a match against Welsh club Bryncethin RFC in Zanzibar.

2018 Safari Sevens (Nairobi): Tawfik was part of the Uganda Sevens team that competed in the Safari Sevens tournament held in Nairobi.

2022 Dubai Sevens: Tawfik was named in the Uganda Sevens Squad for the Emirates Airline Dubai Rugby Sevens scheduled for 2–3 December at The Sevens Stadium in Dubai.

== Awards and achievements ==
Most Valuable Player (MVP) at Jinja Hippos RFC, during the 2019/2020 Nile Special Stout Rugby Premier League season.

Top Try Scorer for Jinja Hippos RFC, during the 2022/2023 season.
