= Hayden Sargeant =

Australian rugby player

- Born: 11 March 1998 (age 28)
- Height: 175 cm (5 ft 9 in)
- Weight: 80 kg (176 lb; 12 st 8 lb)
- School: The Southport School
- University: Bond University

Rugby union career
International career
Years	Team	Apps	(Points)
2018	Australia U20		
National sevens team
Years	Team		Comps
2023-	Australia		

Hayden Sargeant (born 11 March 1998) is an Australian rugby union player. He plays for the Australia national rugby sevens team.

== Early life ==
He attended The Southport School in Gold Coast, Queensland and Bond University, graduating in Construction Management and Quantity Surveying.

== Career ==
He played for Melbourne Rebels U20s prior to playing for the Junior Wallabies in 2018. He left the Melbourne Rebels in 2020 when matches were cancelled due to the COVID-19 pandemic and the squad was streamlined.

He made his debut for the Australia national rugby sevens team in 2023 at the World Rugby Sevens Series in Los Angeles. In July 2024, he was selected for the 2024 Paris Olympics.

== Personal life ==
He was a keen soccer player and skateboarder when he was younger. He works in construction. His brother Beau is also a rugby player.
