= 2022–23 World Rugby Sevens Series =

2022–23 World Rugby Sevens
- Series XXIV
- Hosts: Hong Kong (2 events); United Arab Emirates; South Africa; New Zealand; Australia; United States; Canada; Singapore; France; England
- Date: 4 November 2022 – 21 May 2023
- Nations: 15 core

Final positions
- Champions: New Zealand (14th title)
- Runners-up: Argentina
- Third: Fiji

Series details
- Top try scorer: Va'a Apelu Maliko (50)
- Top point scorer: Akuila Rokolisoa (415)

The 2022–23 World Rugby Sevens Series was the 24th annual series of rugby sevens tournaments for men's national teams. The Sevens Series has been run by World Rugby since 1999. This series doubled as a qualifier for the 2024 Olympic Games, with the top four countries, excluding hosts France, qualifying automatically.

The series was won by New Zealand, winning five of the eleven tour events held during the season on their way to claiming their fourteenth World Series title. The next placed teams were, in order, Argentina, Fiji, France, Australia.

== Core teams ==
The core teams eligible to participate in all tournaments for 2022–23 were:

- Argentina
- Australia
- Canada
- Fiji
- France
- Great Britain
- Ireland
- Japan
- Kenya
- New Zealand
- Samoa
- South Africa
- Spain
- United States
- Uruguay

Uruguay 7s was promoted to core team status by winning the 2022 Challenger Series. The unions of England, Scotland and Wales agreed to merge their teams to compete as Great Britain 7s for the 2022–23 series onward.

== Tour venues ==
The eleven-event schedule for the series was:

2022–23 Itinerary
Leg	Stadium	City	Dates	Winner
Hong Kong 2022	Hong Kong Stadium	Hong Kong	5–6 November 2022	Australia
Dubai	The Sevens Stadium	Dubai	2–4 December 2022	South Africa
South Africa	DHL Stadium	Cape Town	9–11 December 2022	Samoa
New Zealand	FMG Stadium Waikato	Hamilton	21–22 January 2023	Argentina
Australia	Allianz Stadium	Sydney	27–29 January 2023	New Zealand
United States	Dignity Health Sports Park	Los Angeles	25–26 February 2023	New Zealand
Canada	BC Place	Vancouver	3–5 March 2023	Argentina
Hong Kong 2023	Hong Kong Stadium	Hong Kong	31 March – 2 April 2023	New Zealand
Singapore	National Stadium	Singapore	8–9 April 2023	New Zealand
France	Stade Ernest-Wallon	Toulouse	12–14 May 2023	New Zealand
England	Twickenham Stadium	London	20–21 May 2023	Argentina

== Standings ==
The final standings after completion of the eleven tournaments of the series are shown in the table below.

The points awarded to teams at each tournament, as well as the overall season totals, are shown. Gold indicates the event champions. Silver indicates the event runner-ups. Bronze indicates the event third place finishers.

Official standings for the 2022–23 series were:

2022–23 World Rugby Sevens – Men's Series XXIV
Pos.	Event Team	Hong Kong I	Dubai	Cape Town	Hamilton	Sydney	Los Angeles	Vancouver	Hong Kong II	Singapore	Toulouse	London	Points total	Points difference
1	New Zealand	8	17	19	19	22	22	13	22	22	22	14	200	+995
2	Argentina	13	12	12	22	8	19	22	13	19	19	20	179	+549
3	Fiji	19	8	13	10	17	17	10	19	17	8	18	156	+686
4	France	17	13	8	15	15	8	19	17	10	17	12	151	+189
5	Australia	22	10	7	13	10	15	17	5	13	13	8	133	+413
6	Samoa	15	10	22	8	13	13	8	7	15	5	16	132	+472
7	South Africa	10	22	15	10	19	10	3	12	5	10	4	120	+205
8	Ireland	10	19	5	12	12	10	15	8	1	12	10	114	+151
9	Great Britain	5	5	10	5	10	12	10	15	12	10	6	100	–65
10	United States	12	15	17	17	5	3	12	10	3	1	3	98	–131
11	Spain	5	3	5	3	2	7	5	10	8	7	2	57	–156
12	Uruguay	3	7	10	1	3	5	5	5	10	5	0	54	–437
13	Kenya	1	5	3	7	5	1	7	1	7	3	0	40	–358
14	Canada	7	2	2	2	1	5	1	2	2	15	0	39	–414
15	Japan	2	1	1	1	1	2	2	1	5	2	0	18	–1035
16	Tonga	—	—	—	5	7	—	—	—	—	—	0	12	–128
17	Hong Kong	1	—	—	—	—	—	—	3	1	—	—	5	–155
19	Uganda	—	1	1	—	—	—	—	—	—	—	—	2	–164
18	Chile	—	—	—	—	—	1	1	—	—	—	—	2	–171
20	Germany	—	—	—	—	—	—	—	—	—	1	—	1	–67

Legend
Event Medalists
Gold	Event Champions
Silver	Event Runner-ups
Bronze	Event Third place finishers
Qualification for the 2024 Olympic Sevens
Qualified as one of the four highest-placed eligible teams in the 2022–23 World Sevens Series
Automatically qualified (host country France)
Qualification for the 2023–24 World Sevens Series
Participated in the final round play-offs for core team status on the 2023–24 World Sevens Series
No colour	Core team and re-qualified as a core team for the 2023–24 World Sevens Series
Pink	Relegated from core team status for 2023–24
Yellow	Invited team

== Placings summary ==
Tallies of top-four placings in tournaments during the 2022–23 series, by team:

Team	(gold) Gold	(silver) Silver	(bronze) Bronze	Fourth	Total
New Zealand	5	2	1	1	9
Argentina	3	3	—	—	6
South Africa	1	1	—	1	3
Samoa	1	—	1	2	4
Australia	1	—	1	1	3
Fiji	—	3	3	—	6
France	—	1	3	2	6
Ireland	—	1	—	1	2
United States	—	—	2	1	3
Canada	—	—	—	1	1
Great Britain	—	—	—	1	1

== Player statistics ==
=== Dream Team ===
(Argentina) Rodrigo Isgró
(New Zealand) Leroy Carter
(New Zealand) Akuila Rokolisoa
(Argentina) Marcos Moneta
(Argentina) Luciano González Rizzoni
(Samoa) Va'a Apelu Maliko
(Australia) Henry Paterson

=== Scoring ===
Tries scored
Rank	Player	Tries
1	Va'a Apelu Maliko	50
2	Marcos Moneta	47
3	Akuila Rokolisoa	43
4	Perry Baker	35
5	Nathan Lawson	34

Updated: 4 June 2023

Points scored
Rank	Player	Points
1	Akuila Rokolisoa	415
2	Waisea Nacuqu	317
3	Dietrich Roache	262
4	Va'a Apelu Maliko	252
5	Paul Scanlan	246

Updated: 4 June 2023

=== Performance ===
Impact Player winner by event
Tour Leg	Player	Pts	Ref
Hong Kong I	Va'a Apelu Maliko	75	
Hong Kong I	Aaron Grandidier	75	
Dubai	Joseva Talacolo	54	
Cape Town	Manueli Maisamoa	76	
Hamilton	Dietrich Roache	70	
Sydney	Manueli Maisamoa	84	
Los Angeles	Josiah Morra	59	
Vancouver	Theo Forner	70	
Hong Kong II	Andrew Smith	70	
Singapore	Joseva Talacolo	72	
Toulouse	Manu Moreno	67	
London	Akuila Rokolisoa	71	

Overall season Impact Player points
#	Player	T	B	O	C	Tot
1	Va'a Apelu Maliko	122	41	55	214	569
2	Dietrich Roache	134	32	59	198	546
3	Manueli Maisamoa	129	29	58	167	499
4	Akuila Rokolisoa	88	37	58	164	479
5	Varian Pasquet	93	16	71	187	470
6	Rodrigo Isgro	104	29	35	192	453
7	Henry Paterson	107	28	29	187	436
8	Luciano Gonzalez	69	32	27	200	419
9	Matías Osadczuk	107	25	37	160	416
10	Josiah Morra	109	26	15	184	401

Key: T: Tackles (1 pt), B: Breaks (3 pts), O: Offloads (2 pts), C: Carries (1 pt)

Source: Deprecated link at archive.today (archived 22 May 2023)

== Tournaments ==
=== Hong Kong 2022 ===
Event	Winners	Score	Finalists	Semifinalists
Cup	Australia	20–17	Fiji	France (Bronze); Samoa
5th place	Argentina	36–0	United States	Ireland; South Africa
9th place	New Zealand	33–5	Canada	Great Britain; Spain
13th place	Uruguay	33–10	Japan	Hong Kong; Kenya

=== Dubai ===
Event	Winners	Score	Finalists	Semifinalists
Cup	South Africa	21–5	Ireland	New Zealand (Bronze); United States
5th place	France	19–12	Argentina	Australia; Samoa
9th place	Fiji	47–0	Uruguay	Great Britain; Kenya
13th place	Spain	38–7	Canada	Japan; Uganda

=== Cape Town ===
Event	Winners	Score	Finalists	Semifinalists
Cup	Samoa	12–7	New Zealand	United States (Bronze); South Africa
5th place	Fiji	29–5	Argentina	Great Britain; Uruguay
9th place	France	24–12	Australia	Ireland; Spain
13th place	Kenya	21–10	Canada	Japan; Uganda

=== Hamilton ===
Event	Winners	Score	Finalists	Semifinalists
Cup	Argentina	14–12	New Zealand	United States (Bronze); France
5th place	Australia	26–17	Ireland	Fiji; South Africa
9th place	Samoa	26–5	Kenya	Great Britain; Tonga
13th place	Spain	24–14	Canada	Japan; Uruguay

=== Sydney ===
Event	Winners	Score	Finalists	Semifinalists
Cup	New Zealand	38–0	South Africa	Fiji (Bronze); France
5th place	Samoa	24–12	Ireland	Australia; Great Britain
9th place	Argentina	21–19	Tonga	Kenya; United States
13th place	Uruguay	26–5	Spain	Canada; Japan

=== Los Angeles ===
Event	Winners	Score	Finalists	Semifinalists
Cup	New Zealand	22–12	Argentina	Fiji (Bronze); Australia
5th place	Samoa	24–19	Great Britain	Ireland; South Africa
9th place	France	26–24	Spain	Canada; Uruguay
13th place	United States	31–7	Japan	Chile; Kenya

=== Vancouver ===
Event	Winners	Score	Finalists	Semifinalists
Cup	Argentina	33–21	France	Australia (Bronze); Ireland
5th place	New Zealand	50–7	United States	Fiji; Great Britain
9th place	Samoa	35–17	Kenya	Spain; Uruguay
13th place	South Africa	17–5	Japan	Canada; Chile

=== Hong Kong 2023 ===
Event	Winners	Score	Finalists	Semifinalists
Cup	New Zealand	24–17	Fiji	France (Bronze); Great Britain
5th place	Argentina	7–5	South Africa	Spain; United States
9th place	Ireland	19–17	Samoa	Australia; Uruguay
13th place	Hong Kong	17–7	Canada	Japan; Kenya

=== Singapore ===
Event	Winners	Score	Finalists	Semifinalists
Cup	New Zealand	19–17	Argentina	Fiji (Bronze); Samoa
5th place	Australia	24–21	Great Britain	France; Uruguay
9th place	Spain	26–10	Kenya	Japan; South Africa
13th place	United States	22–17	Canada	Hong Kong; Ireland

=== Toulouse ===
Event	Winners	Score	Finalists	Semifinalists
Cup	New Zealand	24–19 (a.e.t.)	Argentina	France (Bronze); Canada
5th place	Australia	26–21	Ireland	Great Britain; South Africa
9th place	Fiji	26–15	Spain	Samoa; Uruguay
13th place	Kenya	33–12	Japan	Germany; United States

=== London ===
Event	Winners	Score	Finalists	Semifinalists
Cup	Argentina	35–14	Fiji	Samoa (Bronze); New Zealand
5th place	France	21–19	Ireland	Australia (7th); Great Britain
9th place	South Africa	47–5	United States	Spain (11th); Japan
Relegation playoffs	Canada	12–7	Kenya	Tonga; Uruguay

== See also ==
- 2022–23 World Rugby Women's Sevens Series
