= Roderick Solo =

Samoan rugby player (born 2001)

- Born: 7 July 2001 (age 25) Samoa
- Height: 183 cm (6 ft 0 in)
- Weight: 80 kg (176 lb; 12 st 8 lb)
- School: Scots College, Wellington

Rugby union career
- Position: Left wing
National sevens team
Years	Team	Comps
2022	New Zealand	9 (10)

Roderick Solo (born 7 July 2001) is a Samoan born New Zealand rugby sevens player.

Solo made his All Blacks Sevens debut at 2022 France Sevens in Toulouse. He was named as a non-travelling reserve for the All Blacks Sevens squad for the 2022 Commonwealth Games in Birmingham.
