= Uruguay national rugby sevens team =

Uruguay
- Union: Uruguayan Rugby Union
- Nickname: Teros
- Emblem: Southern lapwing
- Coach: Luis Pedro Achard
- Captain: Gabriel Puig
Team kit	Change kit

World Cup Sevens
- Appearances: 5 (First in 2005)
- Best result: 10th (2022)

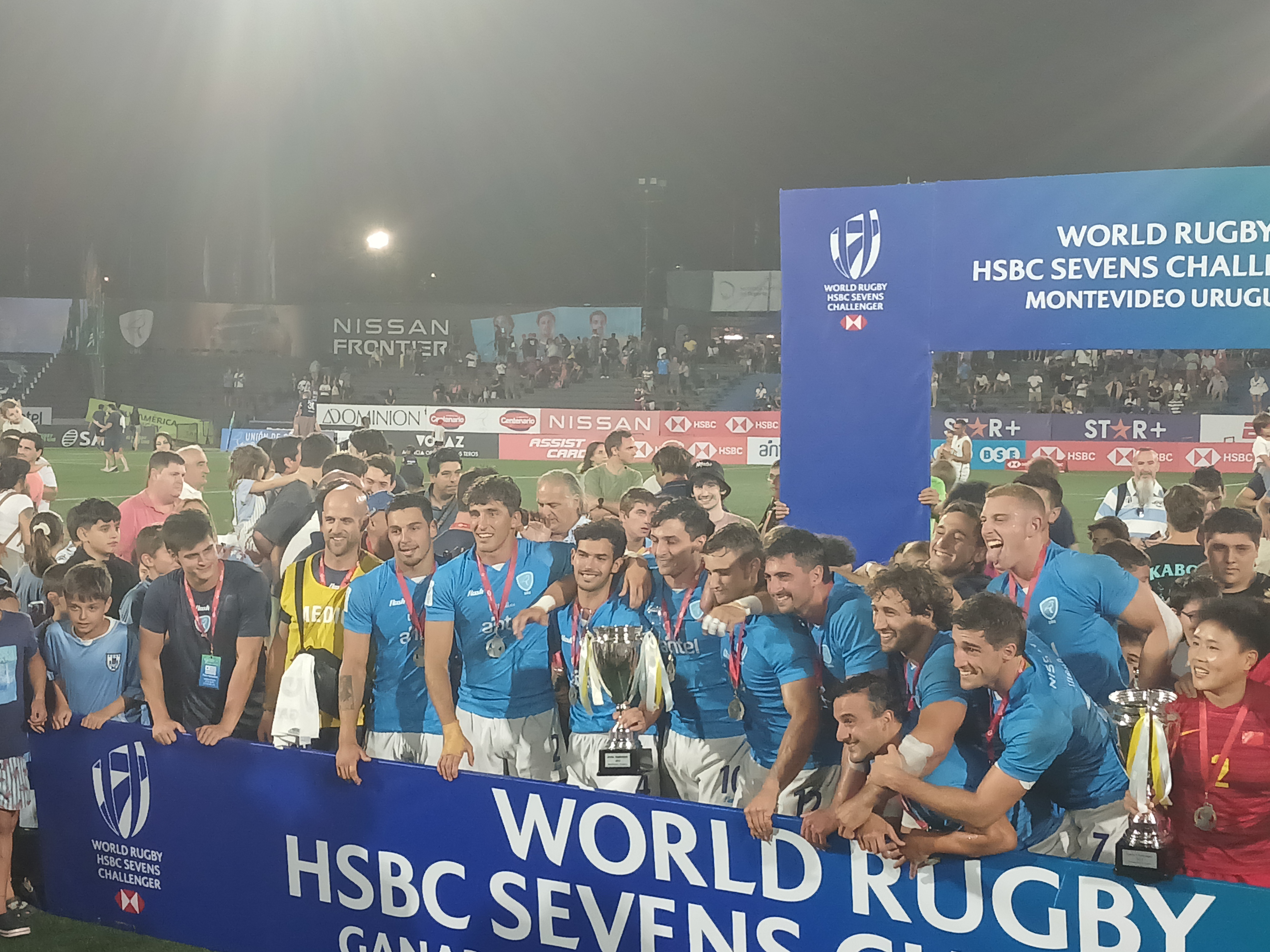
Celebrations at the Sevens Challenger Montevideo

The Uruguay national rugby sevens team participates at the World Rugby and Sudamérica Rugby tournaments for rugby sevens national teams. It is organized by the Uruguayan Rugby Union.

== History ==
The Teros won the Sudamérica Rugby Sevens in 2012, and was runner-up six times. The team was fourth at both the 2011 and 2015 Pan American Games.

Uruguay played six rounds of the inaugural 1999–2000 World Sevens Series, scoring series points at the 2000 Punta del Este Sevens and 2000 Fiji Sevens.

They participated in the 2014 Hong Kong Sevens World Series Qualifier, reaching the quarterfinals after finishing second in their pool, but lost to Russia 21-14. At the 2015 Hong Kong Sevens World Series Qualifier, they claimed wins over Brazil and Mexico and losses to Hong Kong and Papua New Guinea. The team did not qualify to the 2016 Hong Kong Sevens. The team participated in the 2018 World Series Qualifier at the 2018 Hong Kong Sevens.

Uruguay qualified for the 2018 Rugby World Cup Sevens after winning the regional qualifiers at the 2018 Sudamérica Rugby Sevens. They finished in 20th place after losing to Uganda.

The Teros became a core team for the 2022–23 World Rugby Sevens Series, having qualified after winning the 2022 World Rugby Sevens Challenger Series in Chile. The team finished 12th in points, and was relegated from the World Series after finishing third in the 2023 London Sevens play-off.

Uruguay won bronze in round one of the 2024 World Rugby Sevens Challenger Series in Dubai, then won the Montevideo and Munich rounds. The team won the overall series and qualified for the SVNS promotion and relegation play-off competition at the Madrid Sevens. The Teros won three out of four matches and was promoted to the SVNS for the 2024-25 season.

== World Rugby Series ==
=== World Rugby Sevens Challenger Series ===
World Rugby Sevens Challenger Series
Season	Position	Results
2020	5th	Did not qualify
2021	N/A	Competition not held due to covid
2022	1st	Qualified to 2022–23 World Series as core team
2023	N/A	Did not play
2024	1st	Qualified to 2024–25 World Series as core team

== Tournament history ==
=== Olympic Games ===
Olympic Games record
Year	Round	Position	Pld	W	L	D
(Brazil) 2016	Did not qualify					
(Japan) 2020	Did not qualify					
(France) 2024	11th place match	11th	5	4	1	0
Total	0 Titles	1/3	5	4	1	0

=== Pan American Games ===
Pan American Games record
Year	Round	Position	Pld	W	L	D
(Mexico) 2011	Semifinals	4th	6	3	3	0
(Canada) 2015	Semifinals	4th	5	2	3	0
(Peru) 2019	Classification Round	7th	5	1	4	0
(Chile) 2023	Classification Round	5th	5	3	2	0
Total	0 Titles	4/7	21	9	12	0

=== Rugby World Cup Sevens ===
World Cup record
Year	Round	Position	Pld	W	L	D
(Scotland) 1993	Did not enter					
(Hong Kong) 1997	Did not qualify					
(Argentina) 2001	Did not qualify					
(Hong Kong) 2005	Bowl Quarterfinals	21st	6	0	6	0
(United Arab Emirates) 2009	Bowl Semifinals	19th	5	1	4	0
(Russia) 2013	Bowl Semifinals	19th	5	1	4	0
(United States) 2018	19th Place Playoff	20th	4	1	3	0
(South Africa) 2022	Challenge Trophy Final	10th	4	2	2	0
Total	0 Titles	5/8	24	5	19	0

== Players ==
Squad for the 2024 World Rugby Sevens Challenger Series in Dubai.

No.	Players
1	James McCubbin
5	Bautista Basso
6	Diego Ardao
7	Mateo Vinals
8	Koba Brazionis
9	Guillermo Lijtenstein
10	Baltazar Amaya
11	Ignacio Facciolo
12	Juan González
13	Ignacio Alvarez
14	Gaston Mieres
20	Felipe Arcos Perez
