= Great Britain national rugby sevens team =

Great Britain
- Union: British Olympic Association
- Coach: Tony Roques
- Captain: Robbie Fergusson
Team kit	Change kit

First international
- Australia 21–0 Great Britain (25 August 2001)

Largest win
- Great Britain 43–0 Poland (9 July 2016)

Largest defeat
- South Africa 52–0 Great Britain (23 June 2005)

Great Britain national rugby sevens team
Medal record

Olympic Games
Silver medal – second place	2016 Rio de Janeiro	Team

European Games
Silver medal – second place	2023 Kraków–Małopolska	Team

The Great Britain men's national rugby sevens team is the men's international rugby 7s team that is the representative team of Great Britain. The team competes in the annual World Rugby Sevens Series as well as the Olympic Games and European Games. Historically, Great Britain was represented in rugby 7s by England, Scotland and Wales but the inclusion of Rugby 7s at the Olympic and European Games, together with funding issues has resulted in the formation of a permanent combined team from 2023. The separate England, Scotland and Wales teams were due to play in the Rugby World Cup Sevens and the Commonwealth Games, although both competitions are now defunct.

After first having played at the World Games in 2001 and 2005, Great Britain made their debut at the 2016 Summer Olympics, where they won the silver medal, losing the final to Fiji.

== History ==
When rugby sevens was admitted to the Summer Olympics in 2009, it was not initially known how Great Britain could qualify. As the three nations that make up Great Britain, England, Wales and Scotland, all compete separately in international competition, it was suggested that if any of them gained a qualifying spot then Great Britain would qualify. However, the International Olympic Committee (IOC) and the International Rugby Board (IRB), stated that Great Britain must select a lead nation to be the only one able to gain the qualification spot. The individual British rugby unions selected England to be the lead nation as the Rugby Football Union was the only British union to fund a full-time rugby sevens programme. England secured Great Britain's qualification to the 2016 Summer Olympics by finishing fourth in the 2015 Sevens World Series.

Wales rugby sevens winger Lloyd Lewis has said that the decision to combine three nations to form GB sevens teams will limit players' opportunities. He added that a GB team means that there will be more competition for places and less availability for Welsh players.

== Eligibility ==
While England was the team that qualified Great Britain for the 2016 Olympics, the Great Britain national rugby sevens team is able to select players from Wales and Scotland as well as England similar to the British and Irish Lions in rugby union. Northern Irish players according to the British Olympic Association's rules as British citizens would have been eligible to play for Great Britain; however the Irish Rugby Football Union (IRFU) controversially ruled that Northern Ireland players would be compelled to represent the Ireland national rugby sevens team as rugby in Ireland is organised on an All-Ireland basis. However, it was stated that Northern Irish and Ulster contracted players could legally challenge that determination, particularly if Ireland failed to qualify.

== Tournament history ==
=== World Series ===
Season	Position
1999–2021	Did not participate
2021	2nd
2021–22	17th
2022–23	9th
2023–24	8th
Total	4

=== World Games ===
World Games Rugby 7s
Year	Round	Position	Pld	W	L	D
(Japan) 2001	Quarter final	7	5	1	4	0
(Germany) 2005	Third play-off	4	5	2	3	0
(Taiwan) 2009	Did not participate					
(Colombia) 2013	Did not participate					
Total	0 Titles	2/4	10	3	7	0

=== Summer Olympic Games ===
A silver medal for Great Britain in the 2016 Olympics is a considerable achievement for a team that was only formed ten weeks prior the tournament. Where other teams on the sevens circuit had been preparing two years or longer, Team Great Britain coach Amor only got his players together for the first time on May 30 as England, Wales and Scotland were then competing as separate nations in the World Sevens Series.

Olympic Games record
Year	Round	Position	Pld	W	L	D
(Brazil) 2016	Gold Medal Final	2nd	6	5	1	0
(Japan) 2020	Bronze Medal Final	4th	6	3	3	0
(France) 2024	Did not qualify					
Total	-	-	12	8	4	0

Olympic Games History
2016	Pool stage	Great Britain 31–7 Kenya	Win
2016	Pool stage	Great Britain 21–19 Japan	Win
2016	Pool stage	Great Britain 21–19 New Zealand	Win
2016	Quarter-final	Great Britain 5–0 Argentina	Win
2016	Semi-final	Great Britain 7–5 South Africa	Win
2016	Gold Medal Final	Great Britain 7–43 Fiji	Loss
2020	Pool stage	Great Britain 24–0 Canada	Win
2020	Pool stage	Great Britain 34–0 Japan	Win
2020	Pool stage	Great Britain 7–33 Fiji	Loss
2020	Quarter-final	Great Britain 26–21 United States	Win
2020	Semi-final	Great Britain 7–29 New Zealand	Loss
2020	Bronze Medal Final	Great Britain 12–17 Argentina	Loss

== Players ==
=== Current squad ===
The following players have been selected to represent Great Britain during the 2023–24 SVNS tournament beginning in December 2023.

Note: Caps reflect the total number of SVNS events competed in as of the 2023 Dubai Sevens.

Player	Position	Date of birth (age)	Caps	Club/province
Jamie Barden	Forward	10 September 1999 (age 26)	27	Unattached
Kaleem Barreto	Forward	19 December 1998 (age 27)	21	Unattached
Alex Davis	Forward	3 October 1992 (age 33)	38	Unattached
Jamie Farndale	Forward	21 February 1994 (age 31)	57	Unattached
Ross McCann	Forward	30 October 1997 (age 28)	38	(Scotland) Edinburgh
Ethan Waddleton	Forward	23 November 1996 (age 29)	37	Unattached
Morgan Williams	Forward	28 December 1995 (age 30)	37	Unattached
Tom Williams	Forward	30 July 1996 (age 29)	25	Unattached
Matt Davidson	Back	6 November 1999 (age 26)	10	Unattached
Austin Emens	Back	2002 (age 23–24)	1	(England) Bath
Tom Emery	Back	2 July 1998 (age 27)	17	Unattached
Robbie Fergusson (c)	Back	30 August 1993 (age 32)	43	Unattached
Harry Glover	Back	31 December 1995 (age 30)	21	(France) Stade Français

=== Award winners ===
The following Great Britain Sevens players have been recognised at the World Rugby Awards since 2004:

World Rugby Men's 7s Dream Team
Year	No.	Player
2025	1.	Harry Glover
