= 2020 USA Sevens =

Rugby Sevens tournament hosted in the USA

- Sevens World Series XXI
- Host nation: United States
- Date: 29 February – 1 March 2020

Cup
- Champion: South Africa
- Runner-up: Fiji
- Third: New Zealand

Tournament details
- Matches played: 45
- Tries scored: 280 (average 6.22 per match)
- Most points: Napolioni Bolaca (53)
- Most tries: Alec Coombes (7); Marcos Moneta (7)

The 2020 USA Sevens was held in Los Angeles, played at Dignity Health Stadium in Carson in a return to California after a decade in Las Vegas. The rugby sevens tournament was the sixth event of the 2019–20 Sevens World Series for men's teams, and the seventeenth edition of the USA Sevens. South Africa won the tournament, defeating Fiji by 29–24 in extra time.

== Format ==
The sixteen are drawn into four pools of four teams. Each team plays every other team in their pool once. The top two teams from each pool advance to the Cup playoffs and compete for gold, silver and bronze medals. The other teams from each pool go to the classification playoffs for ninth to sixteenth placings.

== Teams ==
Fifteen core teams played in the tournament along with one invitational team, South Korea.

- Argentina
- Australia
- Canada
- England
- Fiji
- France
- Ireland
- Kenya
- New Zealand
- Samoa
- Scotland
- South Korea
- South Africa
- Spain
- United States
- Wales

== Pool stage ==
All times in Pacific Standard Time (UTC−08:00). The pools were scheduled as follows:

=== Pool A ===
Team	Pld	W	D	L	PF	PA	PD	Pts
Fiji	3	3	0	0	116	49	+60	9
France	3	1	1	1	85	71	+14	6
Argentina	3	1	1	1	85	83	+2	6
South Korea	3	0	0	3	38	121	−83	3

29 February 2020
10:29

Argentina	26–26	France
Try: Etchart 0'c Gonzalez 3'c Álvarez 4'c Moneta 7'm Con: Mare (3/4) 0', 3', 5'	Report	Try: O'Connor 1'c Veredamu (2) 5'c, 10'm Riva 14'c Con: Barraque (3/4) 2', 6', 14'

Dignity Health Stadium, Carson
Referee: Damon Murphy (Australia)

29 February 2020
10:51

Fiji	45–7	South Korea
Try: Bolaca 2'm Vakurunabili 4'c Tuimaba 6'c Naduva (3) 7'c, 8'c, 12'c Nacuqu 9'm Con: Bolaca (2/3) 5', 7'; Nacuqu (2/3) 7', 8'; Ikanikoda (1/1) 13'	Report	Try: Jang 7'c Con: Lee (1/1) 7'

Dignity Health Stadium, Carson
Referee: Matt Rodden (Hong Kong)

29 February 2020
13:25

Argentina	45–19	South Korea
Try: Schulz 0'c Moneta 1'm Isgro (2) 2'c, 3'm Cinti 7'c Vanni 9'c Osadczuk 11'c Con: Mare (2/4) 0', 2'; Revol (1/1) 7'; Bazan Velez (2/2) 9', 11'	Report	Try: Jang (2) 5'm, 10'c Hwang 13'c Con: Lee (2/3) 11', 13'

Dignity Health Stadium, Carson
Referee: Francisco González (Uruguay)

29 February 2020
13:47

Fiji	33–28	France
Try: Tuwai 1'c Mocenacagi 3'c Derenalagi 9'c Bolaca 11'm Ratuvoka 13'c Con: Bolaca (2/2) 2', 3'; Nacuqu (1/2) 9'; Ikanikoda (1/1) 13'	Report	Try: Riva (2) 6'c, 7'c Laugel 8'c Valleau 14'c Con: Barraque (4/4) 6', 7', 8', 14'

Dignity Health Stadium, Carson
Referee: Richard Haughton (England)

29 February 2020
16:43

France	31–12	South Korea
Try: O'Connor 1'c Veredamu 2'c Siega (3) 5'm, 8'c, 9'm Con: Barraque (3/5) 1', 2', 8'	Report	Try: Jang 13'c Con: Jang (1/1) 13'; Lee (0/1)

Dignity Health Stadium, Carson
Referee: Craig Evans (Wales)

29 February 2020
17:05

Fiji	38–14	Argentina
Try: Tuwai 0'm Tuimaba (2) 3'c, 7'c Bolaca 9'c Nacuqu 11'c Naduva 13'm Con: Bolaca (3/4) 3', 7', 9'; Nacuqu (1/1) 11'; Ikanikoda (0/1)	Report	Try: Moneta 2'c Osadczuk 5'c Con: Mare (2/2) 2', 5'

Dignity Health Stadium, Carson
Referee: Jérémy Rozier (France)

=== Pool B ===
Team	Pld	W	D	L	PF	PA	PD	Pts
South Africa	3	2	1	0	83	29	+54	8
Ireland	3	1	1	1	48	60	−12	6
Canada	3	1	0	2	41	50	−9	5
Kenya	3	1	0	2	34	67	−33	5

29 February 2020
11:13

Ireland	17–12	Canada
Try: Conroy 1'm O'Shea 10'c Kennedy 13'm Con: Dardis (1/3) 10'	Report	Try: Sauder 4'c Richard 6'm Con: Hirayama (1/2) 5'

Dignity Health Stadium, Carson
Referee: Craig Evans (Wales)

29 February 2020
11:35

South Africa	31–5	Kenya
Try: A. Davids 2'm Pretorius 5'c Kok 9'c du Plessis 12'm du Preez 13'c Con: S. Davids (1/2) 6'; Afrika (1/1) 10' du Preez (1/2) 14'	Report	Try: Ambaka 7'm Con: Oliech (0/1)

Dignity Health Stadium, Carson
Referee: Jérémy Rozier (France)

29 February 2020
14:31

Ireland	12–29	Kenya
Try: Kennedy 10'c O'Shea 11'm Con: Dardis (1/2) 11'	Report	Try: Onyala (3) 1'c, 12'm, 14'm Dennis 3'm Injera 9'c Con: Injera (2/3) 2', 9'; Taabu (0/2)

Dignity Health Stadium, Carson
Referee: Sam Grove-White (Scotland)

29 February 2020
14:53

South Africa	33–5	Canada
Try: Gans 5'c Afrika 7'c Arendse 7'c du Plessis (2) 11'm, 14'c Con: S. Davids (3/4) 6', 7', 7' du Preez (1/1) 14'	Report	Try: Trainor 1'm Con: Kay (0/1)

Dignity Health Stadium, Carson
Referee: Damián Schneider (Argentina)

29 February 2020
18:35

Canada	24–0	Kenya
Try: Douglas (3) 4'm, 7'm, 10'c Berna 12'c Con: Hirayama (2/4) 10', 13'	Report

Dignity Health Stadium, Carson
Referee: Matt Rodden (Hong Kong)

29 February 2020
19:05

South Africa	19–19	Ireland
Try: Gans (2) 1'c, 14'c Arendse 12'm Con: S. Davids (2/3) 2', 14'	Report	Try: Kelly (2) 0'c, 10'm Conroy 7'c Con: Dardis (2/3) 1', 8'

Dignity Health Stadium, Carson
Referee: Damon Murphy (Australia)

=== Pool C ===
Team	Pld	W	D	L	PF	PA	PD	Pts
Australia	3	3	0	0	79	19	+60	9
United States	3	2	0	1	59	46	+13	7
Samoa	3	1	0	2	41	64	−23	5
Scotland	3	0	0	3	33	83	−50	3

29 February 2020
11:57

Australia	31–7	Scotland
Try: Williams 4'm Davies (2) 7'c, 12'm Longbottom 10'c Anderson 13'c Con: Holland (1/3) 8'; Longbottom (2/2) 10', 14'	Report	Try: Rowe 2'c Con: Lowe (1/1) 2'

Dignity Health Stadium, Carson
Referee: Francisco González (Uruguay)

29 February 2020
12:19

United States	19–17	Samoa
Try: Tomasin 5'c Pinkelman 6'm Isles 10'c Con: Hughes (2/3) 5', 10'	Report	Try: Alosio 1'm Perez 3'm Alofipo 7'm Con: Alosio (1/3) 4'

Dignity Health Stadium, Carson
Referee: Richard Haughton (England)

29 February 2020
15:15

Australia	31–5	Samoa
Try: Miller 1'c Williams 4'c Davies 8'c Hutchison 12'm Dunbar 14'm Con: Holland (3/3) 1', 5', 9'; Longbottom (0/2)	Report	Try: Alofipo 6'm Con: Alosio (0/1)

Dignity Health Stadium, Carson
Referee: Craig Evans (Wales)

29 February 2020
15:37

United States	33–12	Scotland
Try: Tomasin 5'c Iosefo 7'm Williams 9'c Unufe 12'c Baker 13'c Con: Hughes (3/4) 5', 10', 12'; Tomasin (1/1) 14'	Report	Try: Lowe 3'c Rowe 8'm Con: Lowe (1/2) 3'

Dignity Health Stadium, Carson
Referee: Jérémy Rozier (France)

29 February 2020
19:35

Scotland	14–19	Samoa
Try: Elms 6'c McCann 13'c Con: Fergusson (2/2) 6', 14'	Report	Try: Alosio 7'; Filipo 8'c Maliko 12'c Con: Alosio (1/1) 8'; Matavao (1/1) 12'

Dignity Health Stadium, Carson
Referee: Damián Schneider (Argentina)

29 February 2020
20:03

United States	7–17	Australia
Try: Tomasin 11'c Con: Hughes (1/1) 11'	Report	Try: Miller 2'c Hutchison 4'm Anderson 6'm Con: Holland (1/3) 2'

Dignity Health Stadium, Carson
Referee: Sam Grove-White (Scotland)

=== Pool D ===
Team	Pld	W	D	L	PF	PA	PD	Pts
New Zealand	3	3	0	0	84	31	+53	9
England	3	1	0	2	53	57	−4	5
Spain	3	1	0	2	43	50	−7	5
Wales	3	1	0	2	45	87	−42	5

29 February 2020
09:45

New Zealand	42–7	Wales
Try: Nanai-Seturo 2'c Mikkelson 7'c Clarke 7'c Warbrick 8'c McGarvey-Black 11'c Dickson 13'c Con: Mikkelson (1/1) 2'; Rokolisoa (4/4) 7', 8', 9', 14'; Knewstubb (1/1) 12'	Report	Try: J. Jones 4'c Con: Thomas (1/1) 5'

Dignity Health Stadium, Carson
Referee: Sam Grove-White (Scotland)

29 February 2020
10:07

England	5–22	Spain
Try: Ellery 9'm Con: Bibby (0/1)	Report	Try: Mateu 1'c Pla (3) 7'm, 11'm, 13'm Con: Hernández (1/2) 1'; Fontes (0/2)

Dignity Health Stadium, Carson
Referee: Damián Schneider (Argentina)

29 February 2020
12:41

New Zealand	21–7	Spain
Try: Ravouvou 1'c Mikkelson 8'c Rokolisoa 13'c Con: Knewstubb (2/2) 1', 9'; Rokolisoa (1/1) 14'	Report	Try: Rodriguez-Guerra 11'c Con: Hernández (1/1) 12'

Dignity Health Stadium, Carson
Referee: Matt Rodden (Hong Kong)

29 February 2020
13:03

England	31–14	Wales
Try: Norton 2'c Mitchell 4'c Kerr 6'c Burgess 9'm Bowen 12'm Con: Mitchell (1/1) 2'; Bibby (2/3) 5', 7'; Emery (0/1)	Report	Try: Benjamin (2) 8'c, 14'c Con: Treharne (2/2) 8', 14'

Dignity Health Stadium, Carson
Referee: Damon Murphy (Australia)

29 February 2020
15:59

Wales	24–14	Spain
Try: Benjamin 1'c Lewis (2) 3'c, 13'm Roach 11'm Con: Treharne (2/4)	Report	Try: Pla 2'c Sainz-Trapaga 5'c Con: Hernández (2/2) 2', 6'

Dignity Health Stadium, Carson
Referee: Richard Haughton (England)

29 February 2020
16:21

England	17–21	New Zealand
Try: Harris (2) 1'm, 14'm Norton 6'c Con: Mitchell (1/3) 6'	Report	Try: McGarvey-Black 3'c Knewstubb 7'c Nanai-Seturo 8'c Con: McGarvey-Black (1/1) 3'; Knewstubb (2/2) 7', 9'

Dignity Health Stadium, Carson
Referee: Francisco González (Uruguay)

== Knockout stage ==
=== Thirteenth place ===
13th place semifinals
1 March 2020 – 11:11 – Dignity Health Stadium
Wales	5
Kenya	29
1 March 2020 – 11:33 – Dignity Health Stadium
South Korea	5
Scotland	45

13th place final
1 March 2020 – 14:07 – Dignity Health Stadium
Kenya	24
Scotland	^{29}_{^{(a.e.t.)}}

Matches

13th place semifinals

1 March 2020
11:11

Wales	5–29	Kenya
Try: Lewis 1'm Con: Treharne (0/1)	Report	Try: Ambaka 2'c Samuel Oliech 7'm Dennis 7'm Achieng 9'm Oluoch 11'c Con: Samuel Oliech (1/4) 2'; Taabu (1/1) 12'

Dignity Health Stadium, Carson
Referee: Damián Schneider (Argentina)

1 March 2020
11:33

South Korea	5–45	Scotland
Try: Park 10'm Con: Lee (0/1)	Report	Try: Miller 1'c Lowe 3'c Coombes (4) 4'm, 9'c, 12'm, 13'c McFarland 5'c Con: Lowe (3/5) 2', 4', 14'; Fergusson (2/2) 6', 9'

Dignity Health Stadium, Carson
Referee: Matt Rodden (Hong Kong)

13th place final

1 March 2020
14:07

Kenya	24–29 (a.e.t.)	Scotland
Try: Ambaka 5'm Odhiambo 7'c Oliech 9'm Amonde 11'c Con: Oliech (2/4) 8', 11'	Report	Try: Fergusson (2) 2'c, 3'm Coombes (2) 6'm, 14'; McFarland 13'c Con: Lowe (2/4) 2', 14'

Dignity Health Stadium, Carson
Referee: Francisco González (Uruguay)

=== Ninth place ===
9th place quarterfinals
1 March 2020 – 08:15 – Dignity Health Stadium
Argentina	31
Wales	5
1 March 2020 – 08:37 – Dignity Health Stadium
Samoa	28
Kenya	19
1 March 2020 – 08:59 – Dignity Health Stadium
Spain	26
South Korea	0
1 March 2020 – 09:21 – Dignity Health Stadium
Canada	24
Scotland	7

9th place semifinals
1 March 2020 – 11:55 – Dignity Health Stadium
Argentina	28
Samoa	12
1 March 2020 – 12:17 – Dignity Health Stadium
Spain	7
Canada	24

9th place final
1 March 2020 – 15:07 – Dignity Health Stadium
Argentina	21
Canada	19

Matches

9th place quarterfinals

1 March 2020
08:15

Argentina	31–5	Wales
Try: Moneta (2) 0'c, 2'm Schulz (2) 3'c, 6'c Moroni 7'm Con: Mare (3/5) 0', 4', 6'	Report	Try: Woolerton 13'm Con: Treharne (0/1)

Dignity Health Stadium, Carson
Referee: Damon Murphy (Australia)

1 March 2020
08:37

Samoa	28–19	Kenya
Try: Afamasaga 1'c Sione (2) 9'c, 13'c Alofipo 14'c Con: Alosio (2/2) 2', 14'; Matavao (2/2) 10', 13'	Report	Try: Oliech 4'c Onyala (2) 5'm, 12'c Con: Taabu (2/3) 4', 12'

Dignity Health Stadium, Carson
Referee: Craig Evans (Wales)

1 March 2020
08:59

Spain	26–0	South Korea
Try: Fontes 4'm Pla (2/2) 7'c, 8'c Alonso 10'c Con: Hernández (3/4) 7', 8', 10'	Report

Dignity Health Stadium, Carson
Referee: Damián Schneider (Argentina)

1 March 2020
09:21

Canada	24–7	Scotland
Try: Braid 5'c Berna 7'm Richard 9'm Trainor 13'c Con: Braid (1/) 5'; Hirayama (1/2) 14'; Kay (0/1)	Report	Try: Coombes 11'c Con: Lowe (1/1) 12'

Dignity Health Stadium, Carson
Referee: Francisco González (Uruguay)

9th place semifinals

1 March 2020
11:55

Argentina	28–12	Samoa
Try: Moneta 1'c Etchart 2'c Osadczuk 5'c Moroni 7'c Con: Mare (4/4) 1', 2', 6', 8'	Report	Try: Filipo 9'm Leilua 10'c Con: Matavao (1/2) 10'

Dignity Health Stadium, Carson
Referee: Francisco González (Uruguay)

1 March 2020
12:17

Spain	7–24	Canada
Try: Fontes 11'c Con: Hernández (1/1) 11'	Report	Try: Jones (2) 3'c, 7'm Kaay 9'm Douglas 13'c Con: Hirayama (2/4) 4', 13'

Dignity Health Stadium, Carson
Referee: Sam Grove-White (Scotland)

9th place final

1 March 2020
15:07

Argentina	21–19	Canada
Try: Mare 4'c Moneta 9'c Osadczuk 14'c Con: Mare (3/3) 4', 10', 14'	Report	Try: Douglas 7'c Fuailefau 8'm Hirayama 11'c Con: Hirayama (2/3) 7', 11'

Dignity Health Stadium, Carson
Referee: Damon Murphy (Australia)

=== Fifth place ===
5th place semifinals
1 March 2020 – 12:39 – Dignity Health Stadium
England	7
Ireland	26
1 March 2020 – 13:01 – Dignity Health Stadium
France	5
United States	24

5th place final
1 March 2020 – 15:31 – Dignity Health Stadium
Ireland	19
United States	24

Matches

5th place semifinals

1 March 2020
12:39

England	7–26	Ireland
Try: Burgess 1'c Con: Mitchell (1/1) 1'	Report	Try: Kennedy 4'c Conroy (2) 6'c, 8'm Leavy 13'c Con: Dardis (2/3) 4', 7'; Roche (1/1) 14'

Dignity Health Stadium, Carson
Referee: Jérémy Rozier (France)

1 March 2020
13:01

France	5–24	United States
Try: Dumortier 2'm Con: Riva (0/1)	Report	Try: Fuala'au 4'c Barrett 7'm Isles 8'c Baker 10'm Con: Hughes (2/4) 4', 8'

Dignity Health Stadium, Carson
Referee: Damon Murphy (Australia)

5th place final

1 March 2020
15:31

Ireland	19–24	United States
Try: Conroy (2) 7'm, 9'c McNulty 10'c Con: Roche (2/2) 10', 11'; Dardis (0/1)	Report	Try: Iosefo 0'c Fuala'au 2'm Isles 6'c Barrett 12'm Con: Hughes (2/4) 0', 6'

Dignity Health Stadium, Carson
Referee: Jérémy Rozier (France)

=== Cup ===
Quarterfinals
1 March 2020 – 09:43 – Dignity Health Stadium
Fiji	26
England	5
1 March 2020 – 10:05 – Dignity Health Stadium
Australia	36
Ireland	0
1 March 2020 – 10:27 – Dignity Health Stadium
New Zealand	29
France	14
1 March 2020 – 10:49 – Dignity Health Stadium
South Africa	12
United States	10

Semifinals
1 March 2020 – 13:23 – Dignity Health Stadium
Fiji	43
Australia	7
1 March 2020 – 13:45 – Dignity Health Stadium
New Zealand	0
South Africa	17

Final
1 March 2020 – 16:26 – Dignity Health Stadium
Fiji	24
South Africa	29 (a.e.t.)
3rd place final
1 March 2020 – 15:55 – Dignity Health Stadium
Australia	19
New Zealand	21

Matches

Quarterfinals

1 March 2020
09:43

Fiji	26–5	England
Try: Bolaca 4'c Tuwai 7'c Tabu 10'c Vakurunabili 12'm Con: Bolaca (2/2) 4', 7'; Nacuqu (1/2) 11'	Report	Try: Bowen 7'm Con: Mitchell (0/1)

Dignity Health Stadium, Carson
Referee: Jérémy Rozier (France)

1 March 2020
10:05

Australia	36–0	Ireland
Try: Longbottom (2) 1'c, 8'm Holland (2) 5'm, 6'c Pincus 11'c Bell 14'm Con: Holland (3/5) 2', 7', 11'; Dunbar (0/1)	Report

Dignity Health Stadium, Carson
Referee: Matt Rodden (Hong Kong)

1 March 2020
10:27

New Zealand	29–14	France
Try: Ravouvou (2) 3'm, 7'm Molia 6'c McGarvey-Black 9'c Clarke 10'm Con: Andrew Knewstubb (2/5) 6', 9'	Report	Try: Riva 2'c Jacquelin 12'c Con: Barraque (2/2) 2', 12'

Dignity Health Stadium, Carson
Referee: Sam Grove-White (Scotland)

1 March 2020
10:49

South Africa	12–10	United States
Try: Oosthuizen 6'c Pretorius 12'c Con: S. Davids (1/2) 13'	Report	Try: Isles (2) 0'm, 4'm Con: Hughes (0/2)

Dignity Health Stadium, Carson
Referee: Richard Haughton (England)

Semifinals

1 March 2020
13:23

Fiji	43–7	Australia
Try: Tuimaba (2) 2'c, 11'm Tuwai 5'm Botitu (2) 7'c, 7'c Ratuvoka 10'c Ikanikoda 14'm Con: Bolaca (3/4) 3', 7', 8'; Nacuqu (1/1) 10'; Ikanikoda (0/1)	Report	Try: Williams 1'c Con: Holland (1/1) 3'

Dignity Health Stadium, Carson
Referee: Richard Haughton (England)

1 March 2020
13:45

New Zealand	0–17	South Africa
	Report	Try: A. Davids (2) 0'm, 6'm Kok 7'c Con: S. Davids (1/3) 8'

Dignity Health Stadium, Carson
Referee: Craig Evans (Wales)

Third Place

1 March 2020
15:55

Australia	19–21	New Zealand
Try: Miller 5'c Longbottom 7'c Malouf 11'm Con: Holland (2/2) 6', 7'; Longbottom (0/1)	Report	Try: Nanai-Seturo 0'c Rokolisoa 3'c Mikkelson 10'c Con: Knewstubb (1/1) 1'; Rokolisoa (1/1) 4'; McGarvey-Black (1/1) 10'

Dignity Health Stadium, Carson
Referee: Matt Rodden (Hong Kong)

Final

1 March 2020
16:26

Fiji	24–29 (a.e.t.)	South Africa
Try: Botitu 0'c Mocenacagi 3'c Bolaca 4'm Tuwai 10'm Con: Bolaca (2/3) 1', 3'; Nacuqu (0/1)	Report	Try: Gans 7'c S. Davids 9'm Dry 13'm du Preez 14'c Makata 15'; Con: S. Davids (1/2) 7' du Preez (1/1) 14'

Dignity Health Stadium, Carson
Referee: Craig Evans (Wales)

== Tournament placings ==
Place	Team	Points
1st place, gold medalist(s)	South Africa	22
2nd place, silver medalist(s)	Fiji	19
3rd place, bronze medalist(s)	New Zealand	17
4	Australia	15
5	United States	13
6	Ireland	12
7	France	11
8	England	10

Place	Team	Points
9	Argentina	8
10	Canada	7
11	Spain	6
12	Samoa	5
13	Scotland	4
14	Kenya	3
15	Wales	2
16	South Korea	1

== Players ==
Dream Team
Forwards	Backs
(Fiji) Asaeli Tuivuaka (Fiji) Sevuloni Mocenacagi (South Africa) JC Pretorius	(Australia) Lachie Miller (South Africa) Stedman Gans (Fiji) Napolioni Bolaca (United States) Carlin Isles

World Sevens Series XXI
Preceded by 2020 Sydney Sevens	2020 USA Sevens	Succeeded by 2020 Canada Sevens
USA Sevens
Preceded by 2019 USA Sevens	2020 USA Sevens	Succeeded by 2021 USA Sevens
