= Rugby sevens at the 2023 European Games =

- Venue: Stadion Miejski
- Location: Kraków, Poland
- Dates: 25–27 June
- Competitors: 312 from 15 nations

Rugby sevens at the 2023 European Games was held in Kraków, Poland. The gold medalists in the men's and women's tournaments qualified for the 2024 Summer Olympics.

The sport was making its European Games debut after making its successful debut at the 2016 Rio Olympics.

In both events, the World Series teams of Great Britain and Spain (and Ireland in the men's tournament) were the top seeds. Other seedings were made following the end of the first round of the Rugby Europe Championship Sevens.

== Qualification ==
=== Men's ===
Qualification	Date	Host	Berths	Qualified team
Host nation	—	—	1	Poland
2022–23 World Rugby Sevens Series	4 November 2022 – 21 May 2023	Various	3	Great Britain
2022–23 World Rugby Sevens Series	4 November 2022 – 21 May 2023	Various	3	Ireland
2022–23 World Rugby Sevens Series	4 November 2022 – 21 May 2023	Various	3	Spain
2022 Rugby Europe Sevens Championship Series	25 June – 3 July 2022	(Portugal) Lisbon (Poland) Kraków	7	Germany
2022 Rugby Europe Sevens Championship Series	25 June – 3 July 2022	(Portugal) Lisbon (Poland) Kraków	7	Belgium
2022 Rugby Europe Sevens Championship Series	25 June – 3 July 2022	(Portugal) Lisbon (Poland) Kraków	7	Italy
2022 Rugby Europe Sevens Championship Series	25 June – 3 July 2022	(Portugal) Lisbon (Poland) Kraków	7	Portugal
2022 Rugby Europe Sevens Championship Series	25 June – 3 July 2022	(Portugal) Lisbon (Poland) Kraków	7	Georgia
2022 Rugby Europe Sevens Championship Series	25 June – 3 July 2022	(Portugal) Lisbon (Poland) Kraków	7	Lithuania
2022 Rugby Europe Sevens Championship Series	25 June – 3 July 2022	(Portugal) Lisbon (Poland) Kraków	7	Czech Republic
2022 Rugby Europe Sevens Trophy	11–19 June 2022	(Croatia) Zagreb (Hungary) Budapest	1	Romania
			12	

=== Women's ===
Qualification	Date	Host	Berths	Qualified team
Host nation	—	—	1	Poland
2022–23 World Rugby Women's Sevens Series	4 November 2022 – 21 May 2023	Various	~~3~~2	Great Britain
2022–23 World Rugby Women's Sevens Series	4 November 2022 – 21 May 2023	Various	~~3~~2	~~Ireland~~
2022–23 World Rugby Women's Sevens Series	4 November 2022 – 21 May 2023	Various	~~3~~2	Spain
2022 Rugby Europe Women's Sevens Championship Series	25 June – 3 July 2022	(Portugal) Lisbon (Poland) Kraków	4	Belgium
2022 Rugby Europe Women's Sevens Championship Series	25 June – 3 July 2022	(Portugal) Lisbon (Poland) Kraków	4	Czech Republic
2022 Rugby Europe Women's Sevens Championship Series	25 June – 3 July 2022	(Portugal) Lisbon (Poland) Kraków	4	Germany
2022 Rugby Europe Women's Sevens Championship Series	25 June – 3 July 2022	(Portugal) Lisbon (Poland) Kraków	4	Romania
2022 Rugby Europe Women's Sevens Trophy	11–19 June 2022	(Croatia) Zagreb (Hungary) Budapest	4	Italy
2022 Rugby Europe Women's Sevens Trophy	11–19 June 2022	(Croatia) Zagreb (Hungary) Budapest	4	Portugal
2022 Rugby Europe Women's Sevens Trophy	11–19 June 2022	(Croatia) Zagreb (Hungary) Budapest	4	Sweden
2022 Rugby Europe Women's Sevens Trophy	11–19 June 2022	(Croatia) Zagreb (Hungary) Budapest	4	Turkey
Replacing Ireland following their qualification for Paris 2024 (Note: As Ireland have already secured their place in the women's Olympic event with a top four placement in the World Rugby Women's Sevens Series, the Irish women's team vacated their European Games quota, which was subsequently awarded to Norway.)	—		1	Norway
			12	

== Participating NOCs ==
The following National Olympic Committees (NOCs), as per the outcome of qualification events, will participate (the number of participating athletes of each NOC are shown in parentheses).

- Belgium (26)
- Czech Republic (26)
- Georgia (13)
- Germany (26)
- Great Britain (26)
- Ireland (13)
- Italy (26)
- Lithuania (13)
- Norway (13)
- Poland (26)
- Portugal (26)
- Romania (26)
- Spain (26)
- Sweden (13)
- Turkey (13)

== Medal summary ==
=== Medal table ===
* Host nation (Poland)

Rank	NOC	Gold	Silver	Bronze	Total
1	Great Britain	1	1	0	2
2	Ireland	1	0	0	1
3	Poland*	0	1	0	1
4	Czech Republic	0	0	1	1
4	Spain	0	0	1	1
Totals (5 entries)		2	2	2	6

=== Medalists ===
Event	Gold	Silver	Bronze
Men	Ireland; Jack Kelly; Andrew Smith; Harry McNulty; Zac Ward; Niall Comerford; Billy Dardis; Jordan Conroy; Liam McNamara; Dylan O'Grady; Terry Kennedy; Mark Roche; Sean Cribbin; Bryan Mollen	Great Britain; Jamie Farndale; Thomas Glyn Williams; Alexander Davis; Kaleem Barreto; Ross McCann; James Barden; Olufemi Sofolarin; Frederick Roddick; Morgan Williams; Robbie Fergusson; Thomas Emery; Will Homer; Max McFarland	Spain; Tobias Sainz-Trápaga; Josep Serres; Asier Pérez; Juan Ramos; Nicolás Nieto; Jaime Mata; Pol Pla; Miguel Reina; Alejandro Laforga; Manuel Moreno; Tiago Romero; Eduardo López; Jaime Manteca
Women	Great Britain; Lisa Thomson; Abbie Brown; Rhona Lloyd; Jade Shekells; Shona Campbell; Lauren Torley; Emma Uren; Heather Cowell; Isla Norman-Bell; Megan Jones; Jasmine Joyce; Amy Wilson-Hardy; Ellie Boatman	Poland; Patrycja Zawadzka; Julianna Schuster; Tamara Czumer-Iwin; Małgorzata Kołdej; Marta Morus; Katarzyna Paszczyk; Anna Klichowska; Hanna Maliszewska; Julia Druzgała; Natalia Pamięta; Sylwia Witkowska; Klaudia Respondek; Martyna Wardaszka	Czech Republic; Julie Doležilová; Pavlína Čuprová; Kristýna Plevová; Christine Tesařová; Kristýna Riegertová; Julie Petříková; Anežka Sládková; Vera Gärtnerová; Petra Vacková; Jana Urbanová; Tereza Baťhová; Veronika Bolfová; Veronika Oupicová

== Paris 2024 qualification ==
The rugby sevens tournament at the 2023 European Games is a direct qualification event for the rugby sevens program in Paris 2024. A total of 2 (team) quota places will be awarded in two events:

Event	Qualification path	Quotas	NOCS
Men's tournament:	The winner of the European Games rugby sevens tournament will earn one team quota place	1	Ireland
Women's tournament	The winner of the European Games rugby sevens tournament will earn one team quota place	1	Great Britain
Total quota places		2	

Teams finishing second and third will progress to the final Paris 2024 qualifier.
