= Sean Cribbin =

Irish rugby union player

- Born: 20 August 1998 (age 28) Dublin, Ireland

Rugby union career
National sevens team
Years	Team	Comps
2017–	Ireland	
Medal record
Men's rugby sevens
Representing Ireland
European Games
Gold medal – first place	2023 Kraków–Małopolska	Team competition

Sean Cribbin (born 20 August 1998) is an Irish rugby union player. He won a gold medal in the Rugby sevens at the 2023 European Games.

== Early life ==
Cribbin attended St. Fintan's High School captaining their Leinster Schools Senior Cup team in 2016/17.

== Career ==
Cribbin made his debut appearances in an Ireland national rugby sevens team in a squad named for the Dubai Sevens in December 2017. Cribbin was a member of the Irish team to gain qualification for the delayed 2020 Summer Olympics held in Tokyo. Cribbin was selected for the Irish team at the 2022 Rugby World Cup Sevens held in Cape Town.

In May 2023, Cribbin featured as Ireland finished sixth at the World Rugby Sevens Series event in London. Cribbin was then selected for the Ireland squad for the 2023 European Games held in Kraków in June 2023. Cribbin featured in the final against Great Britain, with Ireland winning gold in the tournament and therefore qualifying for the 2024 Olympic Games.

Cribbin was initially named as a traveling reserve for the 2024 Summer Olympics but competed on the final day of the men’s tournament, he and Bryan Mollen were called into the squad to replace injured duo Jordan Conroy and Andrew Smith.
