= Bryan Mollen =

Irish rugby sevens player

Brian Mullen
- Born: 25 September 1995 (age 31) Nairobi, Kenya
- Height: 1.89 m (6 ft 2 in)
- Weight: 93 kg (205 lb)
- School: Blackrock College

Rugby union career
- Position: Utility player
National sevens team
| Years | Team | Comps |
| 2018– | Ireland 7s | 12 |
Medal record
Men's rugby sevens
Representing Ireland
European Games
| Gold medal – first place | 2023 Kraków–Małopolska | Team competition |

Bryan Mollen (born 25 September 1995) is an Irish rugby sevens player.

Mollen competed in the men's tournament at the 2020 Summer Olympics. He was part of Ireland's sevens squad at the 2022 Rugby World Cup Sevens in Cape Town.

Mollen was initially named as a traveling reserve for the 2024 Summer Olympics but competed on the final day of the men’s tournament, he and Sean Cribbin were called into the squad to replace injured duo Jordan Conroy and Andrew Smith.
