= 2001 Rugby World Cup Sevens squads =

Here is an overview of the teams which took part at the 2001 Rugby World Cup Sevens.

== Pool A ==
=== Fiji ===
Coach: (Fiji) Rupeni Ravonu

1. Rupeni Caucaunibuca
2. Vilimoni Delasau
3. Fero Lasagavibau
4. Sailosi Naiteqe
5. Taniela Qauqau
6. Senerisi Raque
7. Waisale Serevi
8. Jope Tuikabe
9. Josefa Uluvida
10. Marika Vunibaka

=== Argentina ===
Coach: (Argentina) Gonzalo Albarracín

1. Diego Albanese (Grenoble)
2. Pedro Baraldi (Jockey Club Rosario)
3. Felipe Contepomi (Bristol)
4. Ignacio Corleto (Narbonne)
5. Martín Gaitán (CA San Isidro)
6. Francisco Leonelli (La Tablada)
7. José María Núñez Piossek (Huirapuca)
8. Santiago Phelan (CA San Isidro)
9. Agustín Pichot (Bristol)
10. Hernán Senillosa (Hindu Club)

=== South Korea ===
Coach: (South Korea) Yoo Jung-Hyeom

1. Choi Han-Sik
2. Chun Jong-Man
3. Kim Hyung-Ki
4. Kim Jae-Hyun
5. Lee Jin-Wook
6. Park Chang-Min
7. Park Noh-Young
8. Sung Hae-Kyung
9. Yong Hwan-Myung
10. Yoo Min-Suk

=== Russia ===
Coaches: (South Africa) Jimmy Stonehouse and (Russia) Nikolay Nerush

1. Andrey Evdokimov
2. Vyacheslav Grachaev
3. Viktor Yakolev
4. Andrey Kuzin
5. Viktor Motorin
6. Konstantin Rachkov
7. Alexey Sergeev
8. Andrey Sorokin
9. Vitaly Sorokin
10. Murat Uanbayev

=== Ireland ===
Coach: Denis McBride

1. Jan Cunningham
2. Andrew Dunne
3. James Ferris
4. Derek Hegarty
5. Aidan Kearney
6. Aiden McCullen
7. Conor McPhillips
8. Matt Mostyn
9. David Quinlan
10. James Topping

=== Kenya ===
Coach:William Githinji

1. Kenneth Aswani
2. Benjamin Ayimba
3. Stephen Gitonga
4. Alan Hicks
5. Paul Murunga
6. Felix Ochieng
7. Peter Ocholla
8. Anthony Ongoro
9. Oscar Osir Osula
10. Allan Wamanga

== Pool B ==
=== South Africa ===
Coach: Norman Mbiko

1. Chester Williams
2. Wayne van Heerden
3. Helgard Brink
4. Ricardo Loubscher
5. André Pretorius
6. Bob Skinstad
7. Rodger Smith
8. Paul Treu
9. Breyton Paulse
10. Warren Britz

=== France ===
Coach:Thierry Janeczek

1. Jérôme Troader
2. Matthieu Lièvremont
3. Jean-Victor Bertrand
4. Luc Lafforge
5. Sébastien Viars
6. Franck Corrihons
7. Michel Marfaing
8. Jean-Marc Souverbie
9. Farid Sid
10. Lionel Mallier

=== Cook Islands ===
Coach: Nigel Booker

1. Aaron Enoka
2. Amosa Amosa
3. Conrad Piri
4. Chrysmane Mokoroa
5. Teuvira Uea
6. Teokotai Tua'ivi
7. Lance Fitzpatrick
8. Kiliana Samania
9. Terry Piri
10. Darren Robson

=== Canada ===
Coach: Ric Suggitt

1. Fred Asselin
2. Gregor Dixon
3. Jesse Frender
4. Andrew Hoffmann
5. Mark Irvine
6. Nick Milan
7. Winston Stanley
8. Jeff Williams
9. Morgan Williams
10. Nik Witkowski

=== Georgia ===
Coach: Malkhaz Cheishvili

1. Vasil Abashidze
2. Giorgi Bugianashvili
3. Paliko Jimsheladze
4. Bessik Khamashuridze
5. Vasil Katsadze
6. Archil Kavtarashvili
7. Gia Labadze
8. Malkhaz Urjukashvili
9. Tedo Zibzibadze
10. Badri Khekhelashvili

=== Chinese Taipei ===
Coach:Mao Cheng-Wu

1. Chang Chun-Wei
2. Chang Wei-Cheng
3. Chen Chen-Fu
4. Chen Chai-Hsin
5. Lin Fu-Long
6. Pan Chin-Min
7. Wang Kuo-Feng
8. Wu Chin-Hsien
9. Wu Chin-Wei
10. Yeh Teng-Yuan

== Pool C ==
=== New Zealand ===
Coach: Gordon Tietjens

1. Rodney So'oialo
2. Eric Rush
3. Jared Going
4. Karl Te Nana
5. Amasio Valence
6. Brad Fleming
7. Jonah Lomu
8. Mils Muliaina
9. Craig Newby
10. Roger Randle

=== England ===
Coach: Adrian Thompson

1. Kris Chesney
2. Ben Johnston
3. Grant Seely
4. Joe Worsley
5. Paul Sampson
6. Mike Friday
7. Nigel Simpson
8. Josh Lewsey
9. Paul Sackey
10. Rob Thirlby

=== Japan ===
Coach: (Fiji) Paulo Nawalu

1. Kensuke Iwabuchi
2. Hajime Kiso
3. Toru Kurihara
4. Ryohei Miki
5. Daisuke Ohata
6. Shinji Ono
7. Scott Pierce
8. Masanao Washiya
9. Takeomi Ito
10. Kiyonori Tanaka

=== Spain ===
Coach: Francisco Puertas Soto

1. Carlos Souto - Oviedo
2. Oscar Astarloa - Saint-Jean-de-Luz
3. Fernando Díez - CR Liceo Francés
4. Oriol Ripol - UE Santboiana
5. Alberto Socías - CR Valencia
6. Ferran Velazco - UE Santboiana
7. Steve Tuineau - UE Santboiana
8. José Ignacio Inchausti - Moraleja Alcobendas Rugby Union
9. Álvar Enciso - CR El Salvador
10. Miguel Ángel Frechilla - Valladolid RAC
11. Jorge Prieto - Ciencias CR

=== Zimbabwe ===
Coach:Andy Ferreira

1. Charlton McNab
2. John Ewing
3. Mordechai Mwerenga
4. Leon Greef
5. Ryan Bekker
6. Jeff Tigere
7. Victor Olonga
8. Karl Mudzamba
9. Tafadzwa Manyimo
10. Antony Papenfus

=== Chile ===
Coach: Elías Santillán

1. Edmundo Olfos
2. Nicolas Arancibia
3. Diego Durruty
4. Sebastian Pinto
5. Roberto Infante
6. Bernardo Garcia
7. Cristobal Berti
8. Sebastian Garcia
9. Andrea Erlandsen
10. Cristian Gonzalez

== Pool D ==
=== Samoa ===
Coach: Filipo Saena

1. Tim Cowley
2. Gaolo Elisara
3. Ron Fanuatanu
4. Daniel Farani
5. Ailaoa Samania
6. Toa Samania
7. Semo Sititi
8. Steven So'oialo
9. Luke Mealamu
10. Tanner Vili

=== Australia ===
Coach: Glen Ella

1. Scott Barton
2. Ed Carter
3. Tim Donnelly
4. Richard Graham
5. Julian Huxley
6. Matt Isaac
7. Robert McDonald
8. Sam Payne
9. Cameron Pither
10. Brendan Williams

=== Wales ===
Coach: Colin Hillman

1. Jason Forster
2. Jamie Ringer
3. Will Thomas
4. Gareth Baber
5. Luke Richards
6. Andy Marinos
7. Emyr Lewis
8. Gareth Wyatt
9. Shane Williams
10. Andy Williams

=== Portugal ===
Coach: Evan Crawford

1. António Maurício de Aguilar
2. António Ferreira Pinto
3. Rohan Hoffmann
4. António Da Cunha
5. José Maria Vilar Gomes
6. Miguel Portela
7. Alfredo Simões
8. Pedro Murinello
9. Miguel Barbosa
10. Frederico Sousa

=== Hong Kong ===
Coach: Jim Rowark

1. Cristopher Gordon (HKFC)
2. Will Wild (HKFC)
3. Hamish Bowden (HKFC)
4. Ricky Cheuk Ming Yin (DLA)
5. Carl Murray (Valley)
6. Matthew Reede (HKFC)
7. Warren Warner (HKFC)
8. Roderick Dickson (HKFC)
9. Mark Solomon (DLA)
10. Paul Dingley (Valley)

=== United States ===
Coach: John McKittrick

1. Craig Sim
2. Chip Curtis
3. Malakai Delai
4. Dave DiSorbo
5. Mose Timoteo
6. Alex Magleby
7. Jovesa Naivalu
8. Jason Raven
9. Don Yonger
10. Matt Kane
