= Jack Kelly (rugby union, born 1997) =

Irish rugby union player (born 1997)

- Born: 26 October 1997 (age 29) Dublin, Ireland
- Height: 1.85 m (6 ft 1 in)
- Weight: 86 kg (190 lb)
- School: St Michael's College
- University: Trinity College Dublin

Rugby union career
- Position(s): Wing, Fullback (15s); Forward (7s)
Amateur team(s)
Years	Team	Apps	(Points)
2016–	Dublin University		
Senior career
Years	Team	Apps	(Points)
2018	Leinster	1	(0)
- Correct as of 23 November 2018
International career
Years	Team	Apps	(Points)
2017	Ireland U20		
National sevens team
Years	Team		Comps
2019–	Ireland 7s		2
- Correct as of 14 July 2019
Medal record
Men's rugby sevens
Representing Ireland
European Games
Gold medal – first place	2023 Kraków–Małopolska	Team competition

Jack Kelly (born 26 October 1997) is an Irish former rugby union player, who played for the Ireland national rugby sevens team.

== Early life ==
Kelly was born in Dublin. He lived for two years in France during his childhood, also playing rugby, and speaks fluent French. Kelly attended secondary school at St. Michael's College in Dublin. Despite playing in several strong school teams with fellow future professional rugby players such as Dan Leavy, James Ryan and others, he did not win a Leinster Schools Rugby Senior Cup medal.

== Leinster ==
Kelly joined the Leinster academy immediately upon leaving school in 2016. He made his senior Leinster debut in 2018 against Ospreys. He combines his rugby career with studying law in Trinity College, Dublin.

== National team ==
Kelly was selected to captain the Ireland national under-20 rugby union team for the 2017 Six Nations, becoming the sixth consecutive Ireland under 20s captain to have attended St. Michael's College. Ireland had a mixed campaign, finishing fourth, before enduring a poor Junior World Championship in June 2017, finishing tenth of twelve teams.

Kelly also plays for the Ireland national rugby sevens team. He debuted for the team at the 2019 London Sevens, and also played in a 2019 European qualifying tournament for the 2020 Summer Olympics. Kelly had a breakout season during the 2019–20 World Rugby Sevens Series, Ireland's first season as a core team on the Series, where Kelly led all Irish forwards with nine clean breaks and eight tries.

Kelly was a member of the Ireland national rugby sevens team that qualified for the 2020 Summer Olympics. He also competed for Ireland at the 2022 Rugby World Cup Sevens in Cape Town. Kelly played with the Ireland Men’s Sevens team at the 2024 Summer Olympics where Ireland placed sixth. Kelly announced his retirement from Sevens following the event.

== Personal life ==
Kelly earned a Law degree at Trinity College and began working as a trainee solicitor at McCann FitzGerald LLP in 2022.
