= Manyimo =

Manyimo is a surname. Notable people with the surname include:

- Tafadzwa Manyimo (born 1977), Zimbabwean cricketer
- Tawanda Manyimo (born 1981), Zimbabwean-born New Zealand actor
