= Harry McNulty =

Irish rugby union player

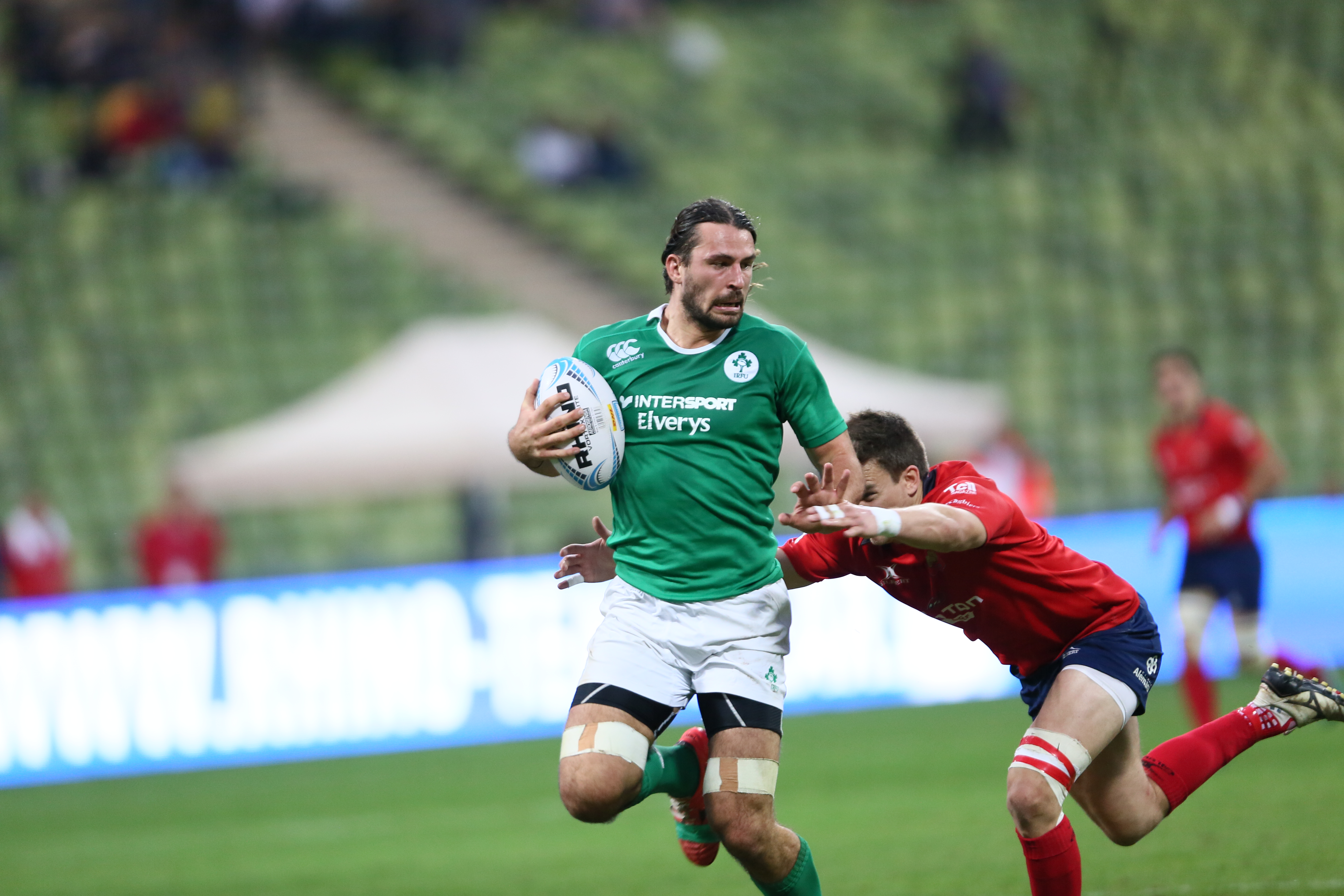
- Born: 5 March 1993 (age 33) Bahrain
- Height: 188 cm (6 ft 2 in)
- Weight: 95 kg (209 lb)
- School: Rockwell College
- University: Trinity College Dublin; University of Limerick; University College Dublin
- Notable relative: Sean McNulty (brother)

Rugby union career
- Position(s): Wing, Centre
Amateur team(s)
Years	Team	Apps	(Points)
2012–14	Munster Academy		
2014–	UCD		
2015–15	Univ. of Queensland		
Senior career
Years	Team	Apps	(Points)
2021	LA Giltinis	7	(10)
2025–	Kalinga Black Tigers		
- Correct as of 10 July 2021
International career
Years	Team	Apps	(Points)
2015–2024	Ireland 7s	183	(155)
- Correct as of 7 December 2024
Medal record
Men's rugby sevens
Representing Ireland
European Games
Gold medal – first place	2023 Kraków–Małopolska	Team competition

Harry McNulty (born 5 March 1993) is an Irish former rugby union player. He most notably played for and captained the Ireland national rugby sevens team.

== Early life ==
McNulty was born in Bahrain to Irish parents. His father worked in financial services and is a former Bahrain Rugby Club player. His mother was a flight attendant working for the then King of Bahrain, Sheikh Isa bin Salman Al Khalifa. He has a younger brother, Sean McNulty, who is also a rugby player.

The family lived in London for three years, then moved to the United States, where they lived for 10 years. In the United States, McNulty discovered he loved ice hockey and played hockey in New York. He played with the Rye Rangers.

At age 14, McNulty's family moved back to Bahrain and from 2006 to 2011 he attended Rockwell College, a boarding school in County Tipperary, for secondary school. At Rockwell, McNulty played rugby for the first time. He was on the school team that finished runner-up in the 2010 Munster Senior Cup, and then won the 2011 Munster Senior Cup by defeating Presentation Brothers College.

== University and club rugby ==
McNulty then played for Garryowen. He joined the Munster Academy for the 2012–13 season, but left the Munster Academy at the end of the 2013–14 season.

From 2012 to 2014, McNulty attended University of Limerick, then transferred to University College Dublin, where he graduated with a Bachelor of Science degree in food science in 2017. As part of that degree, he lived in Brisbane, Australia in 2015 where he studied at the University of Queensland.

During college, McNulty played with the Dublin University Football Club, winning the 2012 club sevens competition.

In 2016, McNulty played club rugby for UCD in Division 1A of the All-Ireland League, under head coach Andy Skehan.

In 2020 McNulty signed with Major League Rugby newcomer LA Giltinis who also signed his brother Sean.

== Ireland national rugby sevens team ==
In 2016, McNulty was part of the Ireland national rugby sevens team when they attempted unsuccessfully to qualify for the 2016 Olympics. In 2017, McNulty remained with the Ireland squad where he played in the Rugby Europe 2017 Sevens Grand Prix Series. McNulty was Ireland's leading try-scorer at the 2017 Moscow Sevens with six tries. McNulty represented Ireland at the 2018 Rugby World Cup Sevens, where Ireland finished ninth. McNulty was part of the Ireland squad at the 2019 Hong Kong Sevens qualifier, where Ireland won the tournament to advance to "core team" status for the 2019–20 World Rugby Sevens Series.

McNulty was a member of the Ireland national rugby sevens team that qualified for the 2020 Summer Olympics. He also competed for Ireland at the 2022 Rugby World Cup Sevens in Cape Town. He led Ireland at the 2024 Summer Olympics in Paris.

== Other work and activities ==
McNulty is an accomplished photographer, sharing his art via Instagram. His work includes self-portraiture, landscapes and night sky photography. In April 2019, McNulty won an all expenses paid Instagram apprenticeship with Royal Caribbean Cruise Line. In April 2019, McNulty – who is a long-time avid photographer – won a position as a Royal Caribbean Cruise Line Instagram apprentice, which funded travel around the world for three weeks during the summer of 2019. In addition to being all-expenses paid, the position had a weekly salary.

As a Shore Explorer, McNulty visited shore-based locations around the world as part of a promotion of land-based offerings of the cruise line. McNulty documented his trip with photographs he posted on Instagram. He used a GoPro camera for much of the video he shot.

In his free time, McNulty has been involved in the Operation Smile charity. In 2020, McNulty joined TV broadcaster Darren Kennedy, stylist Lawson Mpame, Men's Circle Facilitator Darragh Stewart and coach Pat Divily as ambassadors for Movember.
