= Andrew Smith (rugby union, born 2000) =

Irish rugby union player

- Born: 21 July 2000 (age 26) Dublin, Republic of Ireland
- Height: 1.83 m (6 ft 0 in)
- Weight: 86 kg (190 lb)
- School: St Michael's

Rugby union career
- Position(s): Wing (15s); Forward (7s)
Senior career
Years	Team	Apps	(Points)
2021–23	Leinster	2	(0)
2023–2025	Connacht	7	(5)
2025-	Munster	10	(20)
- Correct as of 30 May 2026
International career
Years	Team	Apps	(Points)
2020	Ireland U20s	3	(10)
2021–	Ireland 7s	3	(10)
- Correct as of 3 January 2021
Medal record
Men's rugby sevens
Representing Ireland
European Games
Gold medal – first place	2023 Kraków–Małopolska	Team competition

Andrew Smith (born 21 July 2000) is an Irish rugby union player. He is currently unattached to a province. He also plays for the Ireland national rugby sevens team as a forward.

In school, Smith played rugby with St. Michael's College.

== Provincial play ==
Smith was named in the Leinster academy for the 2020–21 season. He made his Leinster debut in Round 10 of the 2020–21 Pro14 against Connacht.

Smith subsequently played for Connacht and joined Munster in March 2025, scoring four tries in eleven appearances before being released in June 2026.

== National team ==
Smith played for the Ireland under-20 national rugby union team in 2020.

He has played for the Ireland national rugby sevens team as a forward since 2021. He competed for Ireland at the 2022 Rugby World Cup Sevens in Cape Town. He was selected as the Irish Men's 7s Player of the Year for the 2023 season.

He competed for Ireland at the 2024 Summer Olympics in Paris. He was replaced before his sides final game of the men’s tournament after sustaining an injury.
