= Gavin Mullin =

Irish rugby union player (born 1997)

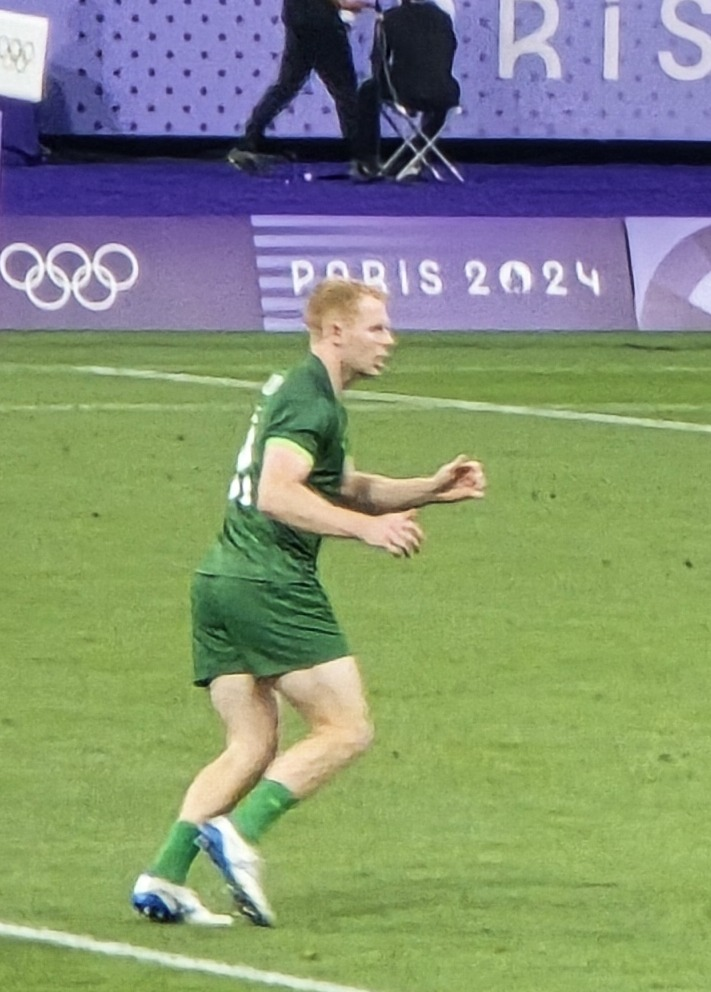
- Mullin in 2024
- Born: 29 November 1997 (age 28) Dublin, Ireland
- Height: 1.83 m (6 ft 0 in)
- Weight: 90 kg (198 lb)
- School: Blackrock College
- University: University College Dublin
- Notable relative: Brendan Mullin (father)

Rugby union career
- Position: Centre
Amateur team(s)
| Years | Team | Apps | (Points) |
| 2016– | UCD | | |
Senior career
| Years | Team | Apps | (Points) |
| 2018–2019 | Leinster | 2 | (0) |
- Correct as of 10 June 2026
International career
| Years | Team | Apps | (Points) |
| 2017 | Ireland U20 | 7 | (0) |
| 2021– | Ireland 7s | 60 | |
- Correct as of 10 June 2026

Gavin Mullin (born 29 November 1997) is an Irish rugby union and rugby sevens player. He plays as a centre and represents UCD in the All-Ireland League. His father is former Ireland international Brendan Mullin.

== Early life ==
Like his father, Mullin attended Blackrock College, winning a Leinster Schools Junior Cup medal in 2013. He was also a member of the school's unsuccessful 2016 Leinster Schools Rugby Senior Cup side.

== Leinster ==
Mullin joined the Leinster Rugby academy ahead of the 2017–18 season, going on to make his debut for the senior team later that season against Zebre, along with several other academy squad members. He was released by Leinster after three seasons having played in just two competitive matches.

== International ==
Mullin played seven times for the Ireland U-20s across the 2017 Six Nations Under 20s Championship and the 2017 World Rugby Under 20 Championship. Mullin was part of the team that lost against hosts the Georgia U-20s, for the first ever time, resulting in a then joint-worst ever finish of ninth at the World Rugby Under 20 Championship.

Mullin has also played for the Ireland national rugby sevens team. He was a member of the team at the 2020 Summer Olympics in Tokyo, held in 2021 due to the COVID-19 pandemic. He also competed for Ireland in rugby sevens events at the 2024 Summer Olympics in Paris.
