= 2016 Rugby Europe Sevens Trophy =

- Hosts: Sweden; Czech Republic
- Date: 11 June - 3 July
- Nations: 12

Final positions
- Champions: Ireland
- Runners-up: Ukraine
- Third: Sweden

The 2016 Rugby Europe Sevens Trophy was the second division of Rugby Europe's 2016 sevens season. This edition was hosted by the cities of Malmö and Prague from 11 June to 3 July. The winner, Ireland, was promoted to the 2017 Grand Prix. The two teams with the fewest points, Monaco and Slovenia, were relegated to Conference 1.

== Trophy standings ==
Legend
Promoted to the Grand Prix series for 2017
Relegated to Conference 1 for 2017

| Rank | Team | Malmö | Prague | Points |
|---|---|---|---|---|
| 1st place, gold medalist(s) | Ireland | 20 | 20 | 40 |
| 2nd place, silver medalist(s) | Ukraine | 16 | 18 | 34 |
| 3rd place, bronze medalist(s) | Sweden | 18 | 14 | 32 |
| 4 | Romania | 12 | 16 | 28 |
| 5 | Israel | 10 | 12 | 22 |
| 6 | Moldova | 14 | 3 | 17 |
| 7 | Cyprus | 8 | 8 | 16 |
| 8 | Denmark | 3 | 10 | 13 |
| 9 | Latvia | 6 | 6 | 12 |
| 10 | Czech Republic | 4 | 4 | 8 |
| 11 | Monaco | 1 | 2 | 3 |
| 12 | Slovenia | 2 | 1 | 3 |

== Malmö ==
Key to colours in group tables
Teams that advance to Cup Quarterfinal
Teams that advance to Bowl Semifinal

=== Pool stage ===
==== Pool A ====
| Teams | Pld | W | D | L | PF | PA | +/− | Pts |
|---|---|---|---|---|---|---|---|---|
| Sweden | 3 | 3 | 0 | 0 | 98 | 17 | 81 | 9 |
| Cyprus | 3 | 2 | 0 | 1 | 52 | 74 | -22 | 7 |
| Romania | 3 | 1 | 0 | 2 | 80 | 59 | 21 | 5 |
| Czech Republic | 3 | 0 | 0 | 3 | 48 | 124 | -76 | 3 |

Matches

11 June 2016
10:28 UTC

| Romania | 7–24 | Sweden |

11 June 2016
10:50 UTC

| Cyprus | 31–24 | Czech Republic |

11 June 2016
13:13 UTC

| Romania | 59–14 | Czech Republic |

11 June 2016
13:35 UTC

| Cyprus | 0–40 | Sweden |

11 June 2016
15:58 UTC

| Romania | 14–21 | Cyprus |

11 June 2016
16:20 UTC

| Czech Republic | 10–34 | Sweden |

==== Pool B ====
| Teams | Pld | W | D | L | PF | PA | +/− | Pts |
|---|---|---|---|---|---|---|---|---|
| Ukraine | 3 | 3 | 0 | 0 | 104 | 19 | 85 | 9 |
| Moldova | 3 | 2 | 0 | 1 | 60 | 44 | 16 | 7 |
| Denmark | 3 | 1 | 0 | 2 | 33 | 46 | -13 | 5 |
| Slovenia | 3 | 0 | 0 | 3 | 12 | 100 | -88 | 3 |

Matches

11 June 2016
9:44 UTC

| Ukraine | 41–0 | Slovenia |

11 June 2016
10:06 UTC

| Moldova | 10–5 | Denmark |

11 June 2016
12:29 UTC

| Ukraine | 29–7 | Denmark |

11 June 2016
12:51 UTC

| Moldova | 38–5 | Slovenia |

11 June 2016
15:14 UTC

| Ukraine | 34–12 | Moldova |

11 June 2016
15:36 UTC

| Denmark | 21–7 | Slovenia |

==== Pool C ====
| Teams | Pld | W | D | L | PF | PA | +/− | Pts |
|---|---|---|---|---|---|---|---|---|
| Ireland | 3 | 3 | 0 | 0 | 119 | 17 | 102 | 9 |
| Latvia | 3 | 1 | 1 | 1 | 60 | 53 | 7 | 6 |
| Israel | 3 | 1 | 1 | 1 | 57 | 58 | -1 | 6 |
| Monaco | 3 | 0 | 0 | 3 | 5 | 113 | -108 | 3 |

Matches

11 June 2016
9:00 UTC

| Latvia | 5–36 | Ireland |

11 June 2016
9:22 UTC

| Israel | 33–0 | Monaco |

11 June 2016
11:45 UTC

| Latvia | 38–0 | Monaco |

11 June 2016
12:07 UTC

| Israel | 7–41 | Ireland |

11 June 2016
14:30 UTC

| Latvia | 17–17 | Israel |

11 June 2016
14:52 UTC

| Monaco | 5–42 | Ireland |

=== Knockout stage ===
Cup

Quarter-finals
12 June 2016 – 10:00 – Malmö
Sweden | 24
Romania | 7
12 June 2016 – 10:22 – Malmö
Moldova | 17
Latvia | 10
12 June 2016 – 10:44 – Malmö
Ukraine | 23
Israel | 0
12 June 2016 – 11:06 – Malmö
Ireland | 31
Cyprus | 12

Semi-finals
12 June 2016 – 13:59 – Malmö
Sweden | 34
Moldova | 7
12 June 2016 – 14:21 –Malmö
Ukraine | 12
Ireland | 26

Final
12 June 2016 – 17:14 – Malmö
Sweden | 0
Ireland | 57
Third place
12 June 2016 – 16:52 – Malmö
Moldova | 0
Ukraine | 31

Plate

Semi-finals
12 June 2016 – 13:15 – Malmö
Romania | 17
Latvia | 7
12 June 2016 – 13:37 –Malmö
Israel | 17
Cyprus | 14

Final
12 June 2016 – Malmö
Romania | 40
Israel | 12
Third place
12 June 2016 – Malmö
Latvia | 0
Cyprus | 19

Bowl

Semi-finals
12 June 2016 – 11:28 – Malmö
Denmark | 33
Monaco | 12
12 June 2016 – 11:50 –Malmö
Czech Republic | 38
Slovenia | 7

Final
12 June 2016 – Malmö
Denmark | 14
Czech Republic | 19
Third place
12 June 2016 – Malmö
Monaco | 7
Slovenia | 38

== Prague ==
Key to colours in group tables
Teams that advance to Cup Quarterfinal
Teams that advance to Bowl Semifinal

=== Pool stage ===
==== Pool A ====
| Teams | Pld | W | D | L | PF | PA | +/− | Pts |
|---|---|---|---|---|---|---|---|---|
| Ireland | 3 | 3 | 0 | 0 | 143 | 5 | +138 | 9 |
| Israel | 3 | 2 | 0 | 1 | 55 | 54 | +1 | 7 |
| Cyprus | 3 | 1 | 0 | 2 | 75 | 70 | +5 | 5 |
| Monaco | 3 | 0 | 0 | 3 | 7 | 151 | -144 | 3 |

Matches

2 July 2016
10:00

| Ireland | 57-0 | Monaco |

2 July 2016
10:22

| Israel | 17-14 | Cyprus |

2 July 2016
12:45

| Ireland | 53-0 | Cyprus |

2 July 2016
13:07

| Israel | 33-7 | Monaco |

2 July 2016
15:30

| Ireland | 33-5 | Israel |

2 July 2016
15:52

| Cyprus | 61-0 | Monaco |

==== Pool B ====
| Teams | Pld | W | D | L | PF | PA | +/− | Pts |
|---|---|---|---|---|---|---|---|---|
| Sweden | 3 | 3 | 0 | 0 | 117 | 15 | +102 | 9 |
| Romania | 3 | 2 | 0 | 1 | 84 | 33 | +51 | 7 |
| Latvia | 3 | 1 | 0 | 2 | 52 | 47 | +5 | 5 |
| Slovenia | 3 | 0 | 0 | 3 | 5 | 163 | -158 | 3 |

Matches

2 July 2016
10:44

| Sweden | 61-5 | Slovenia |

2 July 2016
11:06

| Romania | 19-5 | Latvia |

2 July 2016
13:29

| Sweden | 28-0 | Latvia |

2 July 2016
13:51

| Romania | 55-0 | Slovenia |

2 July 2016
16:14

| Sweden | 28-10 | Romania |

2 July 2016
16:36

| Latvia | 47-0 | Slovenia |

==== Pool C ====
| Teams | Pld | W | D | L | PF | PA | +/− | Pts |
|---|---|---|---|---|---|---|---|---|
| Ukraine | 3 | 3 | 0 | 0 | 95 | 7 | +88 | 9 |
| Denmark | 3 | 2 | 0 | 1 | 43 | 57 | -14 | 7 |
| Moldova | 3 | 1 | 0 | 2 | 26 | 65 | -39 | 5 |
| Czech Republic | 3 | 0 | 0 | 3 | 20 | 55 | -35 | 3 |

Matches

2 July 2016
11:28

| Ukraine | 33-7 | Denmark |

2 July 2016
11:50

| Moldova | 12-10 | Czech Republic |

2 July 2016
14:13

| Ukraine | 24-0 | Czech Republic |

2 July 2016
14:35

| Moldova | 14-17 | Denmark |

2 July 2016
16:58

| Ukraine | 38-0 | Moldova |

2 July 2016
17:20

| Czech Republic | 10-19 | Denmark |

=== Knockout stage ===
Bowl

Semi-finals
3 July 2016 – TBA – Prague
Moldova | 66
Slovenia | 0
3 July 2016 – TBA – Prague
Czech Republic | 56
Monaco | 7

Final
3 July 2016 – Prague
Moldova | 13
Czech Republic | 33
Third place
3 July 2016 – Prague
Slovenia | 0
Monaco | 28

Plate

Quarter-finals
3 July 2016 – TBA – Prague
Ireland | 45
Cyprus | 0
3 July 2016 – TBA – Prague
Sweden | 24
Latvia | 0
3 July 2016 – TBA – Prague
Ukraine | 19
Israel | 0
3 July 2016 – TBA – Prague
Romania | 42
Denmark | 0

Semi-finals
3 July 2016 – TBA – Prague
Cyprus | 14
Denmark | 19
3 July 2016 – TBA –Prague
Latvia | 7
Israel | 22

Final
3 July 2016 – TBA – Prague
Denmark | 12
Israel | 21
Third place
3 July 2016 – TBA – Prague
Cyprus | 43
Latvia | 7

Cup

Quarter-finals
3 July 2016 – TBA – Prague
Ireland | 45
Cyprus | 0
3 July 2016 – TBA – Prague
Sweden | 24
Latvia | 0
3 July 2016 – TBA – Prague
Ukraine | 19
Israel | 0
3 July 2016 – TBA – Prague
Romania | 42
Denmark | 0

Semi-finals
3 July 2016 – TBA – Prague
Ireland | 24
Romania | 0
3 July 2016 – TBA –Prague
Sweden | 10
Ukraine | 12

Final
3 July 2016 – TBA – Prague
Ireland | 52
Ukraine | 0
Third place
3 July 2016 – TBA – Prague
Romania | 24
Sweden | 10
