= Anthony Eddy =

- Born: Anthony Eddy; 1965 or 1966 (age 60–61)

Rugby union career
Coaching career
- Years: Team
- 1999–2000: Sydney University
- 2002: Australia U21
- 2005–2007: Worcester
- 2014–2022: Ireland 7s (Head Coach)

Anthony Eddy is a rugby union coach who recently was employed by the Ireland Rugby Football Union from December 2014 to March 2022. His role with the IRFU was as both the Director of rugby sevens and the Director of women's rugby. Eddy was brought in to oversee the Ireland national rugby sevens team shortly after the program was established in October 2014.

Eddy has spent much of his coaching career in Australia. He coached the Australia under-20 national rugby union team. Eddy was General Manager for of rugby sevens for the Australian Rugby Union from 2013 to 2014, a position that involved developing the Australia national rugby sevens teams for the upcoming 2016 Olympics and building the annual Australia Sevens tournament. He also worked as an assistant coach in Super Rugby for the ACT Brumbies from 2002 to 2004, and the Queensland Reds.

Eddy was also the head coach for the Worcester Warriors in England from the summer of 2005 until the autumn of 2006.
