= Ben Cronin =

Irish rugby union player

- Born: Benjamin Michael Cronin; 13 July 1968 (age 58)
- Height: 6 ft 5 in (1.96 m)
- Weight: 238 lb (108 kg; 17.0 st)

Rugby union career
- Position: Back-Row
Amateur team(s)
| Years | Team | Apps | (Points) |
- Garryown
| – | Orrell | | |
Senior career
| Years | Team | Apps | (Points) |
| 1996–98 | Munster | 8 | (15) |
International career
| Years | Team | Apps | (Points) |
| 1995–97 | Ireland | 2 | (0) |
National sevens team
| Years | Team | | Comps |
| 1993 | Ireland | | 1993 RWC |

Ben Cronin is a retired Irish rugby union player. He played for Garryowen, Munster, Orrell and also won two caps for Ireland between 1995 and 1997. He mainly played at Number 8 but could also play at flanker. Cronin attended Cistercian College, Roscrea.

Ben Cronin founded KYCKR.COM in Waterford, Ireland in 2007.
