= Niall Comerford =

Irish rugby union player

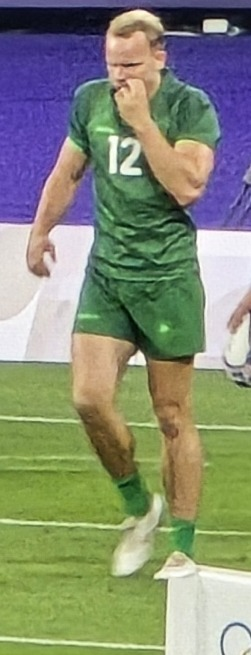
- Born: 6 April 2000 (age 26) Dublin, Republic of Ireland
- Height: 1.83 m (6 ft 0 in)
- Weight: 87 kg (192 lb; 13 st 10 lb)

Rugby union career
- Position: Wing
Senior career
Years	Team	Apps	(Points)
2020–	Leinster	0	(0)
- Correct as of 28 November 2021
International career
Years	Team	Apps	(Points)
2021–	Ireland Sevens	3	(0)
- Correct as of 28 November 2021
Medal record
Men's rugby sevens
Representing Ireland
European Games
Gold medal – first place	2023 Kraków–Małopolska	Team competition}

Niall Comerford (born 6 April 2000) is an Irish rugby union player, currently playing for United Rugby Championship and European Rugby Champions Cup side Leinster. His preferred position is wing.

== National team ==
Comerford has represented the Ireland national rugby sevens team in the World Rugby Sevens Series. He debuted for the national sevens team in 2021.

He competed for Ireland at the 2024 Summer Olympics in Paris.

== Personal Life ==
Niall's brother, Evin was involved in the 2013 Leinster School's Junior Cup Third Division, where he narrowly lost the Cup Final to Terenure College.
