= Matt Mostyn =

Irish rugby union player

- Born: Matthew R. Mostyn; 10 September 1974 (age 52) Sydney, NSW, Australia
- Height: 6 ft 2 in (1.88 m)
- Weight: 212 lb (96 kg; 15.1 st)
- School: Saint Ignatius' College, Riverview

Rugby union career
- Position: Full-back/Wing
Amateur team(s)
Years	Team	Apps	(Points)
- Eastwood
–	Galwegians		
Senior career
Years	Team	Apps	(Points)
1998-1999	Bègles-Bordeaux		
2000-2003	Newport	80	(250)
Provincial / State sides
Years	Team	Apps	(Points)
1995-1998	NSW		
1999-00, 2003-08	Connacht	100	(115)
International career
Years	Team	Apps	(Points)
1999	Ireland	6	(15)
National sevens teams
Years	Team		Comps
- Australia 7s
–	Ireland 7s		

Matt Mostyn is a retired Irish-Australian rugby player. He earned six caps playing as a wing for the Ireland national rugby union team, including four at the 1999 Rugby World Cup, being eligible through a grandparent from County Tyrone. He played club rugby with the New South Wales Waratahs in Australia, with Bordeaux in France, Newport in Wales and Ireland, finishing his career at Connacht and Galwegians in 2008.

Mostyn also played sevens for the Ireland national rugby sevens team. He played at the 2001 Rugby World Cup Sevens and also played several legs of the World Rugby Sevens Series.

Mostyn was educated at Saint Ignatius' College, Riverview in Sydney, Australia. He earned a journalism degree in 2005.
