= Dylan O'Grady =

Irish rugby union player

Dylan O'Grady (born 19 November 1971 in Manchester) is a rugby union former player who has also coached. He played as a blind-side flanker. Although English-born, he qualified to play for Ireland through his grandparents, winning one cap for Ireland in 1997 against Italy. O’Grady’s career was interrupted when he was convicted and imprisoned for conspiracy to supply drugs following a police undercover operation.

He was educated at St Ambrose College, and played for Sale more than 100 games taking part in the 1997 Pilkington Cup Final at Twickenham. He also was a member of the Irish Exiles.

Since 1998 till 2008, Dylan has had a long and successful 10 years at Fylde. The former player also coached the forwards.
