= Billy Dardis =

Irish rugby union player (born 1995)

- Born: William Dardis; 31 January 1995 (age 31) Dublin, Ireland
- Height: 1.78 m (5 ft 10 in)
- Weight: 87 kg (192 lb)
- School: Newbridge College; Terenure College
- University: University College Dublin

Rugby union career
- Position(s): Scrum-half (7s); Fullback (15s)
Amateur team(s)
Years	Team	Apps	(Points)
2013–	UCD		
Senior career
Years	Team	Apps	(Points)
2016–2017	Leinster	0	(0)
International career
Years	Team	Apps	(Points)
2014–2015	Ireland U20	10	(15)
- Correct as of 20 June 2015
National sevens team
Years	Team		Comps
2015–	Ireland 7s		24
Medal record
Men's rugby sevens
Representing Ireland
European Games
Gold medal – first place	2023 Kraków–Małopolska	Team competition

Billy Dardis (born 31 January 1995) is an Irish rugby union player. He is the captain of the Ireland national rugby sevens team, and also plays for Terenure College RFC in Division 1A of the All Ireland League.

== Youth ==
In his youth, Dardis played rugby with Naas RFC. In secondary school, Dardis initially played for Newbridge College in Kildare, where he also played Gaelic football. Dardis switched to Terenure College, where he focused on rugby, and he played with Terenure in the Leinster Schools Senior Cup. Dardis also featured for Leinster at both u-18 and u-19 youth levels.

== Club ==
Dardis entered the Leinster academy in 2013. Dardis also played for UCD. After three years in the Leinster academy, he was awarded his first fully professional contract ahead of the 2016–17 season. After making no appearances for the province, however, Dardis left at the end of the 2016–17 season with Leinster not offering a new contract.

== International ==
Dardis formerly played for the Ireland national under-20 rugby union team. He was on the under-20 squad in 2014 and in 2015, playing in the World Rugby under-20 Championship. He also impressed at the under-20 Six Nations with his footwork and pace.

Dardis currently plays scrum-half for the Ireland national rugby sevens team. He was on the squad in 2016 that unsuccessfully attempted to qualify for the 2016 Olympics. He was the captain of the team for the Rugby Europe 2017 Sevens Grand Prix Series, which served as a qualifying tournament for the 2018 Hong Kong Sevens and the 2018 Rugby World Cup Sevens.

Dardis captained the team at the 2018 Rugby World Cup Sevens. He led Ireland to a ninth-placed finish, the highest finish for any non core World Series team. Dardis finished the tournament with 32 points, ranked second among all players.

Dardis also captained the team at the 2019 Hong Kong Sevens qualifier, where Ireland won the tournament to qualify to play as a “core team” on the 2019–20 World Rugby Sevens Series.

Dardis captained the Ireland national rugby sevens team that qualified for the 2020 Summer Olympics. He competed for Ireland at the 2022 Rugby World Cup Sevens in Cape Town.
