= Tom Williams (rugby union, born 1996) =

Welsh rugby union footballer

- Full name: Thomas Williams
- Born: 30 July 1996 (age 30) Shrewsbury, Shropshire, England
- Height: 191 cm (6 ft 3 in)
- Weight: 100 kg (15 st 10 lb; 220 lb)
- School: Coleg Llandrillo

Rugby union career
- Position: Wing
- Current team: Cardiff RFC
Senior career
| Years | Team | Apps | (Points) |
| 2017–2025 | Ospreys | 10 | (0) |
International career
| Years | Team | Apps | (Points) |
- Wales U20
| 2017–2018 | Wales Sevens | | |
Medal record
Men's rugby sevens
Representing Great Britain
European Games
| Silver medal – second place | 2023 Kraków–Małopolska | Team competition |

Tom Williams (born 30 July 1996) is a Welsh rugby union player who plays for Cardiff RFC as a wing. Born in Shrewsbury, England, he was a Wales under-20 and Wales Sevens international.

Williams made his debut for the Ospreys in 2017 having previously played for the Ospreys academy, RGC 1404, Swansea RFC and the Ospreys Development team. He made his Pro14 debut on 8 September 2018 against the Cheetahs.
