= Terry Kennedy (rugby union, born 1996) =

Irish rugby union player

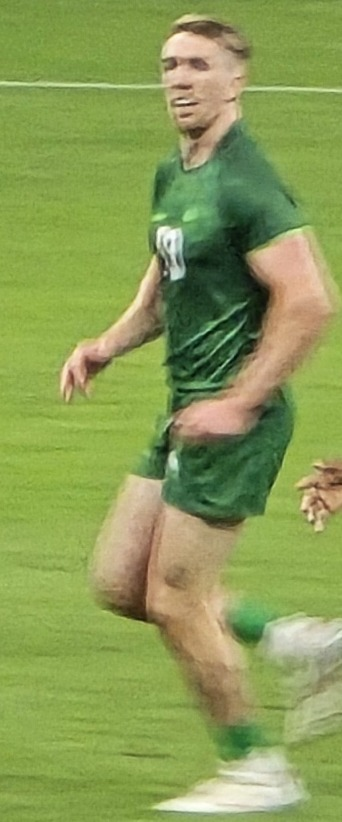
- Born: 4 July 1996 (age 30) Dublin, Ireland
- Height: 1.83 m (6 ft 0 in)
- Weight: 84 kg (185 lb)
- Occupation: Professional rugby player

Rugby union career
- Position(s): Centre (7s); Wing (15s)
Amateur team(s)
Years	Team	Apps	(Points)
2016–	St. Mary's		
Senior career
Years	Team	Apps	(Points)
2016–2018	Leinster		
2025–	Chennai Bulls		
International career
Years	Team	Apps	(Points)
2016	Ireland U20	3	(5)
National sevens team
Years	Team		Comps
2016–	Ireland 7s		40
Medal record
Men's rugby sevens
Representing Ireland
European Games
Gold medal – first place	2023 Kraków–Małopolska	Team competition
Rugby World Cup Sevens
Bronze medal – third place	2022 Cape Town	Team competition

Terry Kennedy (born 4 July 1996) is an Irish rugby union player who plays for the Ireland national rugby sevens team.

== Rugby career ==
Kennedy was a member of the Irish team that won the silver medals of 2017 Rugby Europe Sevens Grand Prix Series. He also helped Ireland win the 2018 Moscow Sevens tournament — he scored two tries in the final as Ireland defeated Germany 28–7, and was the leading try scorer in the tournament overall with nine tries.

Kennedy scored a try in the final of the 2019 Hong Kong Sevens qualifier to help Ireland defeat Hong Kong 28–7 and qualify for the 2019–20 World Rugby Sevens Series. He was named as a member of the HSBC Dream Team, as well as being crowned the Top Try Scorer for the 2021–22 World Rugby Sevens Series.

In his youth, Kennedy played for the Ireland national under–20 team. He was a member of the under-20 squad that were runners up in the World Cup Final. Kennedy plays his club rugby with St. Mary's College with whom he won the All-Ireland League 1B title in 2017.

Kennedy competed for Ireland at the 2022 Rugby World Cup Sevens in Cape Town. Kennedy won the 2022 World Rugby Men's Sevens Player of the Year.

Kennedy's father, also named Terry, was an Irish rugby union international, winning 13 caps between 1978 and 1981.

He competed for Ireland at the 2024 Summer Olympics in Paris.

Kennedy was included in the World Rugby Sevens Dream Team of the Year at the World Rugby Awards in Monaco

It was announced Kennedy would compete in the Rugby Premier League in India for the Chennai Bulls
