= Ireland national rugby sevens team =

Ireland
- Union: Irish Rugby Football Union
- Coach: James Topping
- Captain: Harry McNulty
- Most caps: Harry McNulty (181) (Note: Caps include only those earned on the World Rugby Sevens Series main event)
- Top scorer: Jordan Conroy (615) (Note: Points include only those scored on the Sevens Series main event)
- Most tries: Jordan Conroy (123) (Note: Tries include only those scored on the Sevens Series main event)
Team kit	Change kit

First international
- New Zealand 18–22 Ireland (7 April 1973)

Largest win
- Hungary 0–80 Ireland (1 June 1996)

Largest defeat
- Fiji 56–0 Ireland (23 November 2000)

World Cup Sevens
- Appearances: 7 (First in 1993)
- Best result: 3rd place (1993, 2022)

The Ireland national rugby sevens team competed in several international rugby sevens competitions. The team was governed by the Irish Rugby Football Union (IRFU). In May 2025 the IRFU dismantled the programme at the end of the 2024/25 season, insisting the move was part of "a broader strategic effort to ensure the IRFU's long-term financial sustainability." This decision was met with widespread criticism.

Ireland competed as a 'core team' on the World Rugby Sevens Series, a competition held every year from winter to spring around the globe. The 2019–20 season was Ireland's first season as a core team. At the 2019 Hong Kong Sevens Ireland won the World Series Qualifier tournament for the 2019–20 World Rugby Sevens Series, earning "core team" status for the first time. Prior to this Ireland had competed in individual tournaments within World Rugby Sevens Series, though not as a core team. Ireland became the first non-core side to medal at a World Series tournament at the 2018 London Sevens, where they finished in third place. Following their inclusion as a core side, they earned 2nd-place finishes twice, at the 2022 France Sevens and the 2022 Dubai Sevens.

Ireland also competed in major quadrennial rugby sevens tournaments and their qualifying tournaments. Ireland has competed in most Rugby World Cup Sevens since the 1993 inaugural event, with their best results including finishing third in 1993 and 2022. The team also competed during qualifying for the Summer Olympics, but failed to qualify for the inaugural rugby sevens competition at the 2016 Summer Olympics. On 20 June 2021 Ireland qualified for the 2020 Summer Olympics.

Following the announcement in 2009 that rugby sevens would be an Olympic sport beginning in 2016, the Irish Rugby Football Union created a men's rugby sevens programme in 2014. In 2015, the IRFU announced its goal to field a national sevens team that would qualify for the Summer Olympics and the World Rugby Sevens Series. Thereafter Ireland began offering professional contracts to its squad of sevens players. In 2022 Ireland equalled their best ever World Cup Sevens performance, winning the bronze medal.

Ireland also participated in the Rugby Europe Sevens Series.

== History ==
Ireland competed at the 1973 International Seven-A-Side Tournament, the first rugby sevens tournament for national teams. They defeated New Zealand, Australia and Scotland in the groups phase, before losing to England in the finals.

=== Start of the Olympic era (2009–2018) ===
Ireland increased its emphasis in rugby sevens when the International Olympic Committee voted in 2009 to restore rugby to the events program in 2016. In March 2011, the IRFU announced its support for Shamrock Warriors RFC. The club's aim was to establish a pool of experienced Sevens players for the IRFU to develop into a future international Sevens squad. The pool would experience playing in the top-level competition, should the IRFU become involved in professional international sevens or in the Olympic Sevens.

Despite the 2009 announcement of rugby sevens as an Olympic sport, the IRFU was initially slow to recognize the opportunity. In September 2013, the IRFU said it was unlikely to send a sevens team to the 2016 Summer Olympics. The IRFU did not introduce a men's rugby sevens national team program until October 2014. The IRFU announced in December 2014 the hiring of Anthony Eddy as the Director of Irish rugby sevens, both the men's and women's teams. In December 2014 the IRFU issued a notice to all Irish athletes to see what if could become an Elite Sevens rugby player. The IRFU hoped to see the best rugby club talent available as well as attracting athletes with transferable skills from other team sports such as athletics, basketball, and Gaelic Games. The IRFU held four talent identification days across Ireland in January 2015.

The IRFU announced in May 2015 its brand new 27-man squad for the 2015 season, selected out of a pool of more than 300 applicants, a squad that later became known as "The Originals". The new team started at the bottom, beginning the 2015 season in Europe's Division C, with an eye towards gaining promotion to higher levels of competition. The highlight of Ireland's 2015 and 2016 seasons was the attempt to qualify for the 2016 Summer Olympics. At the 2015 Europe Olympic Repechage Tournament, Ireland finished with 4–1–1 record, and despite a 10–24 semifinal loss to Russia, their third-place finish gained the last European slot for the 2016 Final Olympic Qualification Tournament. At the 2016 Final Olympic Qualifying Tournament, Ireland finished pool play with a 3–0 record including a 27–21 win over Samoa. However, a quarterfinal loss to Spain (7–12) eliminated them from the 2016 Summer Olympics.

Entering the 2017 season, with the Irish men's rugby sevens program in place for just over two years, the IRFU still had not handed out any full-time professional contracts to any sevens players. For the 2017 summer season, Ireland played in the European Grand Prix Sevens, which included four tournaments during summer 2017. Ireland began the Grand Prix by winning the first tournament, the 2017 Moscow Sevens, defeating Spain 12–0 in the final.

For the 2017–18 season, Ireland selected a core squad of 14 players that would prioritize Sevens play for the autumn 2017 tournaments, although they are not full-time Sevens players, and they retain their club status. Ireland finished ninth at the 2017 Silicon Valley Sevens with a 3–2 record; their record against World Series core teams was a respectable 2–2, with two wins over Canada.

As of December 2018, the IRFU was due to announce shortly their first-ever professional contracts for sevens players.

=== World Series core team (2019–2025) ===
Ireland qualified as a core team for the 2019–2020 World Rugby Sevens Series by winning the 2019 Hong Kong qualifier. In May 2019, despite the squad qualifying for the World Rugby Sevens Series, the IRFU announced that players would remain on an €18,000 basic annual salary with bonuses of €500 for participating in each of the 10 World Series tournaments – the equivalent of a development contract.

In March 2022, Anthony Eddy stepped down both as IRFU director of women's rugby and 7's rugby. Ireland secured their best ever overall finish in the World Rugby Sevens Series with a 5th-place finish in the 2021–22 series. Later that year, Ireland equalled its best World Cup Sevens performance, winning the bronze medal for the second time (the first in 1993). Terry Kennedy capped off the program's successful season, by winning the World Rugby Sevens Player of the Year, mirroring the achievement of his XV's countrymen and counterpart, Josh van der Flier.

Ireland finished sixth at the 2024 Summer Olympics, losing in the quarterfinals to eventual finalist Fiji. In the months following the Olympics, a number of team veterans retired, including caps leader Harry McNulty.

== Players ==
=== Final Squad ===
2025 Los Angeles SVNS

- Zac McConnell
- Mark Roche
- Conor Phillips
- Niall Comerford
- Bryan Mollen
- Ed Kelly
- Aaron O'Sullivan
- Josh Costello
- Dylan O'Grady
- Josh Kenny
- Tadhg Brophy
- Nicholas Greene
- Daniel Hawkshaw

Olympians
(Japan) Tokyo 2020	(France) Paris 2024
Coach: (Australia) Anthony Eddy: Jack Kelly; Adam Leavy; Harry McNulty; Foster Horan; Ian Fitzpatrick; Billy Dardis; Jordan Conroy; Greg O'Shea; Mark Roche; Terry Kennedy; Hugo Lennox; Gavin Mullin; Bryan Mollen	Coach: (Ireland) James Topping: Jack Kelly; Andrew Smith; Harry McNulty; Mark Roche; Zac Ward; Chay Mullins; Jordan Conroy; Hugo Keenan; Hugo Lennox; Terry Kennedy; Gavin Mullin; Niall Comerford; Sean Cribbin; Bryan Mollen

== World Rugby Sevens Series ==
Ireland had a sparse participation in the World Rugby Sevens Series until 2019.

Ireland competed in two of the ten tournaments of the inaugural 1999–2000 World Sevens Series: at the 2000 Hong Kong Sevens, Ireland finished 17th to win the Bowl with a 4–2 record; at the 2000 Paris Sevens, Ireland finished tied for 11th with a 3–2 record. The following season, in the 2000–01 World Sevens Series, Ireland played in the 2000 Dubai Sevens where they finished 9th, winning the Bowl with a 4–2 record, including a 19–17 semifinal win over Wales.

Ireland has, however, since assembling a permanent sevens program in 2014, publicly stated in 2014 and again in 2015 that its goal is to qualify as one of the 15 core teams in the World Series. At the 2018 Hong Kong Sevens qualifying tournament for the 2018–19 World Series, Ireland posted a 3–0 record in pool play, winning all three matches by comfortable 20+ point margins, to advance to the knockout rounds. Ireland defeated Zimbabwe 38–5 in the quarterfinals, but lost to Japan 7–12 in the semifinal and failed to qualify for the 2018-19 World Series.

Ireland competed as an invitational team at the 2018 London Sevens and the 2018 Paris Sevens. At the 2018 London Sevens Ireland defeated the favoured United States and England teams en route to finishing third overall. At the penultimate World Rugby Sevens Series event in London in 2018, the Irish team "stole the show", finishing in third place in their first World Series tournament since 2004, Ireland thus becoming the first invitational side to reach the semi-finals and then the podium of a World Rugby Sevens Series event. Invited to the following event in Paris, Ireland finished seventh, their second top half finish as an invitational side, and the first invitational side to do so.

The following year, Ireland again played in the 2019 Hong Kong Sevens qualifier. Ireland won the tournament, defeating Hong Kong 28–7 in the final, with Jordan Conroy's 10 tries across six matches earning him Player of the Tournament. Ireland again appeared at the 2019 London Sevens and 2019 Paris Sevens, reaching the quarterfinals of the London Sevens.

Ireland joined the World Rugby Sevens Series as a "core status" team for the first time for the 2019–20 season. In their first tournament, the 2019 Dubai Sevens, Jordan Conroy led all scores with seven tries and was named to the tournament Dream Team. The ten-tournament season was cut to six tournaments due to the global COVID-19 pandemic. Ireland reached the quarter-final round in three of the six tournaments during the season, finishing in 10th place. Wing Jordan Conroy led all try scorers in the competition with 30 tries, with centre Terry Kennedy finishing fifth with 17 tries. In May 2022, Ireland achieved their highest ever position at a World Series event, reaching the final of the Toulouse Sevens before falling 17–29 to Fiji. Ireland reached their second World Series final at the 2022 Dubai Sevens losing to South Africa in the final, 5–21.

=== Season by season ===
Ireland at the World Series
Season	Rank	Pts	Events	Best event	GP	W	D	L	Win %	PF	PA	Diff	Most tries	Most points
1999–00	—N/a	0	2 / 10	11th (Paris)	11	6	0	5	55%	242	205	+37	J. Topping (10)	J. Topping (52)
2000–01	17th	2	1 / 9	9th (Dubai)	6	4	0	2	67%	132	154	–22	Matt Mostyn (6)	Gavin Duffy (37)
2001–02	—N/a	0	2 / 11	10th (Cardiff)	11	3	0	8	27%	176	231	–55	James Ferris (6)	Paddy Wallace (49)
2002/03 – 2003/04	Did not compete													
2004–05	—N/a	0	2 / 7	14th (Dubai)	11	2	1	8	18%	192	267	–75	T. O'Leary (7)	I. Humphreys (52)
2005/06 – 2016/17	Did not compete													
2017–18	15th	27	2 / 10	3rd (London)	11	5	1	5	45%	186	228	–42	J. Conroy (11)	J. Conroy (55)
2018–19	16th	19	2 / 10	6th (London)	12	6	0	6	50%	241	278	–37	M. McGrath (6)	B. Dardis (47)
2019–20	10th	49	6 / 6	6th (twice)	28	11	2	15	39%	558	610	–52	J. Conroy (30)	J. Conroy (150)
2021	6th	20	2 / 2	4th (Vancouver)	12	5	2	5	42%	200	173	+27	C. Phillips (6)	C. Phillips (30)
2021–22*	5th	92	9 / 9	2nd (Toulouse)	52	25	0	27	48%	951	857	+94	T. Kennedy (50)	T. Kennedy (250)
2022–23	8th	114	11 / 11	2nd (Dubai)	62	31	2	29	50%	1052	901	+151	J. Conroy (32)	J. Conroy (160)
2023–24 (League)	2nd	104	7 / 7	2nd (Singapore)	40	23	0	17	58%	712	581	+131	Terry Kennedy (31)	Terry Kennedy (155)
2023–24 (Grand Final)	5th	—N/a	1 / 1	5th	5	3	0	2	60%	95	90	+5	J. Conroy; Zac Ward (3)	Hugo Lennox (23)
2024–25 (League)	11th	23	6 / 6	7th (twice)	28	7	0	21	25%	326	603	-277	Dylan O'Grady (9)	Dylan O'Grady (45)
*To take account of the impacts of the global COVID-19 pandemic, a unique ranking points system was applied to the 2022 Series which saw only the best seven out of the nine tournament results count towards the Series ranking for each team.

Updated as of 5 June 2024
Results listed above do not include matches played as part of the Hong Kong World Series qualifier competition.

Ireland at the Hong Kong Sevens WS qualifier
Season	Position	GP	W	D	L	Win %	Pts scored	Tries	Most tries	Most points	Qualified
2018	3rd	5	4	0	1	80%	148	24	T. Kennedy (5)	Mark Roche (28)	No
2019	1st	6	5	1	0	83%	179	27	Jordan Conroy (10)	Jordan Conroy (50)	Yes
Total	—N/a	11	9	1	1	82%	327	51	Terry Kennedy (11)	Terry Kennedy (55)	—N/a

== Summer Olympics ==
Olympic Games record
Year	Round	Pos	Pld	W	D	L	PF	PA	Diff	Most tries	Most Points
(Brazil) 2016	Did not qualify										
(Japan) 2020	9–12th place playoff	10th	5	2	0	3	74	81	–7	G. Mullin (3)	G. Mullin (15)
(France) 2024	5–8th place playoff	6th	6	3	0	3	101	74	+27	C. Mullins (5)	C. Mullins (25)
Total	0 Titles	2/3	11	5	0	6	175	155	+20	C. Mullins (5)	C. Mullins (25)

Olympics qualifying
Olympics	Qualifying competition(s)	Pos	GP	W	D	L	PF	PA	Diff	Most tries	Qualification
2016	(Portugal) 2015 European	3rd	6	4	1	1	115	84	+31	Wootton / McNulty / Byrne / Fitzpatrick (3)	Qualified for 2016 playoff
2016	(Monaco) 2016 intercontinental	7th	5	3	0	2	108	81	+27	M. McGrath / T. Daly (3)	Did not qualify for 2016 Olympics
2020	(France) 2019 European	3rd	6	4	1	1	169	62	+107	J. Conroy (9)	Qualified for 2020 playoff
2020	(Monaco) 2020 intercontinental	1st	6	6	0	0	182	41	+141	J. Conroy (11)	Qualified for 2020 Olympics
2024	(Poland) 2023 European Games	1st	6	6	0	0	199	38	+161	J. Conroy (6)	Qualified for 2024 Olympics
Total	—N/a	—N/a	29	23	2	4	773	306	+467	—N/a	—N/a

=== 2016 Olympics qualifying ===
Ireland began Olympic qualifying by playing in Division C within Europe. In the 6–7 June 2015 Division C tournament, Ireland went 6–0 in the competition to win Division C, winning all six matches by a comfortable margin. This win qualified them to participate in Division B. In the 20–21 June, 2015 Division B tournament, Ireland again went 6–0 to win Division B, again winning all six matches by a comfortable margin. This win qualified them for the European repechage tournament.

In the 18–19 July 2015 Rugby Europe sevens repechage in Lisbon, Ireland topped their group with wins over Italy and Georgia and a draw against Russia. In the knockout competition, Ireland defeated Lithuania 17–0 in the quarterfinals. Ireland then lost in the semifinals to Russia 10–24, but in the third-place match defeated Georgia 15–7 to finish third overall, and secure the third and final European qualifying place for the Final 2016 Men's Olympic Qualification Tournament.

The Irish team drew Samoa, Tonga and Zimbabwe in the final Olympic repechage tournament in Monaco. Ireland finished first in their group with three wins, including a close 27–21 over World Series team Samoa. Ireland lost in the quarterfinals to Spain, 7–12, and did not qualify for the Olympics.

=== 2020 Olympics ===
Ireland finished third at the 2019 Rugby Europe qualifying tournament. With this result, they did not automatically qualify for the 2020 Olympics, but gained a spot in the final inter-continental playoff tournament. They then won the playoff tournament to secure the last qualifying spot in the 2020 Summer Olympics.

Ireland opened their 2020 Olympic campaign with losses to both South Africa and the United States. Despite a five-point victory over Kenya and a third-place finish in their pool, Ireland failed to achieve a quarterfinal spot due to an unfavourable points difference. They subsequently defeated South Korea 31–0, before losing to Kenya, to finish in 10th place.

=== 2024 Olympics ===
Ireland defeated Great Britain 26–12 in the final of the 2023 European Games, thereby qualifying for the 2024 Summer Olympics.

=== Previous Olympic Squads ===
- 2020 Ireland Olympic squad
- 2024 Ireland Olympic squad

== Rugby World Cup Sevens ==
Rugby World Cup Sevens
Year	Round	Position	Pld	W	D	L	PF	PA	Diff	Most tries	Most points
(Scotland) 1993	Semifinalist	3rd	9	6	0	3	185	109	+76	Richard Wallace (7)	Eric Elwood (60)
(Hong Kong) 1997	Bowl Semifinalist	19th	6	1	0	5	94	158	–64	David Humphreys (5)	David Humphreys (31)
(Argentina) 2001	Bowl Semifinalist	19th	7	2	1	4	108	176	–68	James Topping (4)	Topping / Ferris (20)
(Hong Kong) 2005	Plate Quarterfinalist	13th	6	2	0	4	100	159	–59	Maxwell / Humphreys (6)	Ian Humphreys (44)
(United Arab Emirates) 2009	Bowl Finalist	18th	6	3	0	3	94	110	–16	Tonetti / Carney (3)	Tom Gleeson (19)
(Russia) 2013	Did not enter										
(United States) 2018	Challenge Winner	9th	5	4	0	1	99	97	+2	Dardis / Conroy (4)	Billy Dardis (32)
(South Africa) 2022	Semifinalist	3rd	5	4	0	1	94	62	+32	McNulty / Conroy (3)	Mark Roche (18)
Total	0 Titles	7/8	44	22	1	21	774	871	–97	Richard Wallace (10)	Eric Elwood (60)

Rugby World Cup Sevens Qualifying
RWC	Competition	Position	Pld	W	D	L	PF	PA	Diff	Qualification
1997	(Portugal) 1996 Qualifiers	Cup Semifinalist	6	4	1	1	273	53	+220	Qualified
2001	(Germany) 2000 Qualifiers	3rd	8	7	0	1	245	74	+171	Qualified
2022	(Romania) 2022 Qualifiers	—N/a	4	4	0	0	140	17	+123	Qualified
Total	—N/a	—N/a	18	15	1	2	658	144	+514	—N/a

Ireland has played in six out of the seven Rugby World Cup Sevens tournaments. Ireland's best finish was the inaugural 1993 tournament. In that tournament, they went 4–1 in pool play, including an upset win over France, to qualify to the quarterfinal round. In the quarterfinal round of pool play they went 2–1 with wins over Samoa and Tonga to reach the semifinals. Ireland faced Australia in the semifinal and was leading but an Australia try and conversion at the end resulted in a 19–21 loss.

Since the inaugural tournament, however, Ireland's performances have been comparatively unremarkable, as they have yet to secure another quarterfinal place. At the 1997 tournament, Ireland finished 19th, posting a 1–5 record which included losses to minnows Hong Kong and Japan, with its only win a 33–5 victory over Portugal in the Bowl quarterfinal. In 2001, Ireland finished fifth in its group of six, unable to notch wins against Russia or Korea, relegating it to the Bowl competition; they defeated Chinese Taipei in the Bowl quarterfinal but lost 12–33 to Portugal in the Bowl semifinal.

In 2005, Ireland fared slightly better, with its 2–3 record in group play qualifying it for the Plate competition, where they lost to Samoa 14–19 in the Plate quarterfinal. In 2009, Ireland was up-and-down in pool play, notching a surprise win against Australia, but a disappointing loss against Portugal. Ireland was one of three teams in a four-team group to finish with a 1–2 record in pool play, but Ireland was ranked last in the group on points difference and was relegated to the Bowl competition. There they posted a 2–1 record in knockout play, eventually losing to Zimbabwe in the Bowl final 17–14. Ireland did not qualify for the 2013 World Cup, failing to send a team to the 2012 Sevens Grand Prix qualifying tournaments.

Ireland had a better tournament in 2018, defeating core teams Kenya, Wales, and Australia en route to a ninth-place finish, their best finish since the inaugural 1993 tournament.

Ireland qualified for 2022 tournament, by going undefeated in their four matches at the 2022 Rugby World Cup Sevens European Qualifier in July 2022. At the tournament Ireland won four of their five matches including a 24–14 quarterfinal victory over hosts South Africa, on their way to a bronze medal finish.

=== Previous World Cup squads ===
- 1993 Ireland Rugby World Cup Sevens
- 1997 Ireland Rugby World Cup Sevens
- 2001 Ireland Rugby World Cup Sevens
- 2005 Ireland Rugby World Cup Sevens
- 2009 Ireland Rugby World Cup Sevens
- 2018 Ireland Rugby World Cup Sevens

== Rugby Europe Sevens ==
Rugby Europe Sevens Record
Season	Competition	Position	GP	W	D	L	Win %	PF	PA	Diff	Promotion / Qualification
2002–03	Did not compete										
2004	(Poland) Qualifying	1st	8	6	0	2	75%	184	34	+150	
2004	(Croatia) Qualifying	2nd	6	5	0	1	83.33%	167	52	+115	Qualified for 2004 European Sevens Championship
2004	(Spain) Championship	3rd	6	4	0	2	66.67%	129	81	+47	Qualified for 2005 Rugby World Cup Sevens
2005–07	Did not compete										
2008	(Denmark) Qualifying	2nd	6	5	0	1	83.33%	242	39	+203	
2008	(Poland) Qualifying	1st	6	6	0	0	100%	200	0	+200	Qualified for 2008 European Sevens Championship
2008	(Germany) Championship	4th	7	4	0	3	57.14%	124	92	+32	Qualified for 2009 Rugby World Cup Sevens
2009–14	Did not compete										
2015	(Bosnia and Herzegovina) Division C	1st	6	6	0	0	100%	291	20	+271	Promoted to the 2015 Division B competition
2015	(Croatia) Division B	1st	6	6	0	0	100%	384	0	+384	Qualified for 2015 Rugby Europe repechage; Promoted to 2016 Division A (Trophy) competition
2016	(Sweden) (Czech Republic) Trophy	1st	12	12	0	0	100%	497	46	+451	Promoted to 2017 Grand Prix series
2017	(Europe) Grand Prix	2nd	24	21	0	3	87.5%	572	225	+347	Advanced to 2018 Hong Kong Sevens qualifier for World Series; Qualified for 2018 Rugby World Cup Sevens
2018	(Europe) Grand Prix	1st	24	23	0	1	95.83%	780	138	+642	Advanced to 2019 Hong Kong Sevens qualifier for World Series
2019	(Russia) (Poland) Grand Prix	3rd	12	8	0	4	66.67%	276	186	+90	
2020	Cancelled due to Covid-19										
2021	Did not compete										
2022	(Croatia) (Hungary) Trophy	1st	12	12	0	0	100%	533	35	+366	Promoted to 2023 Championship Series
2023	(Portugal) (Germany) Championship	1st	12	10	0	2	83.33%	254	132	+122	
2024	(Croatia) (Germany) Championship	2nd	12	10	1	1	83.33%	312	102	+210	
Total	—N/a	—N/a	159	138	1	20	86.79%	4,945	1,182	+3,763	—N/a

Updated 30 June 2024

=== 2002–2014 ===
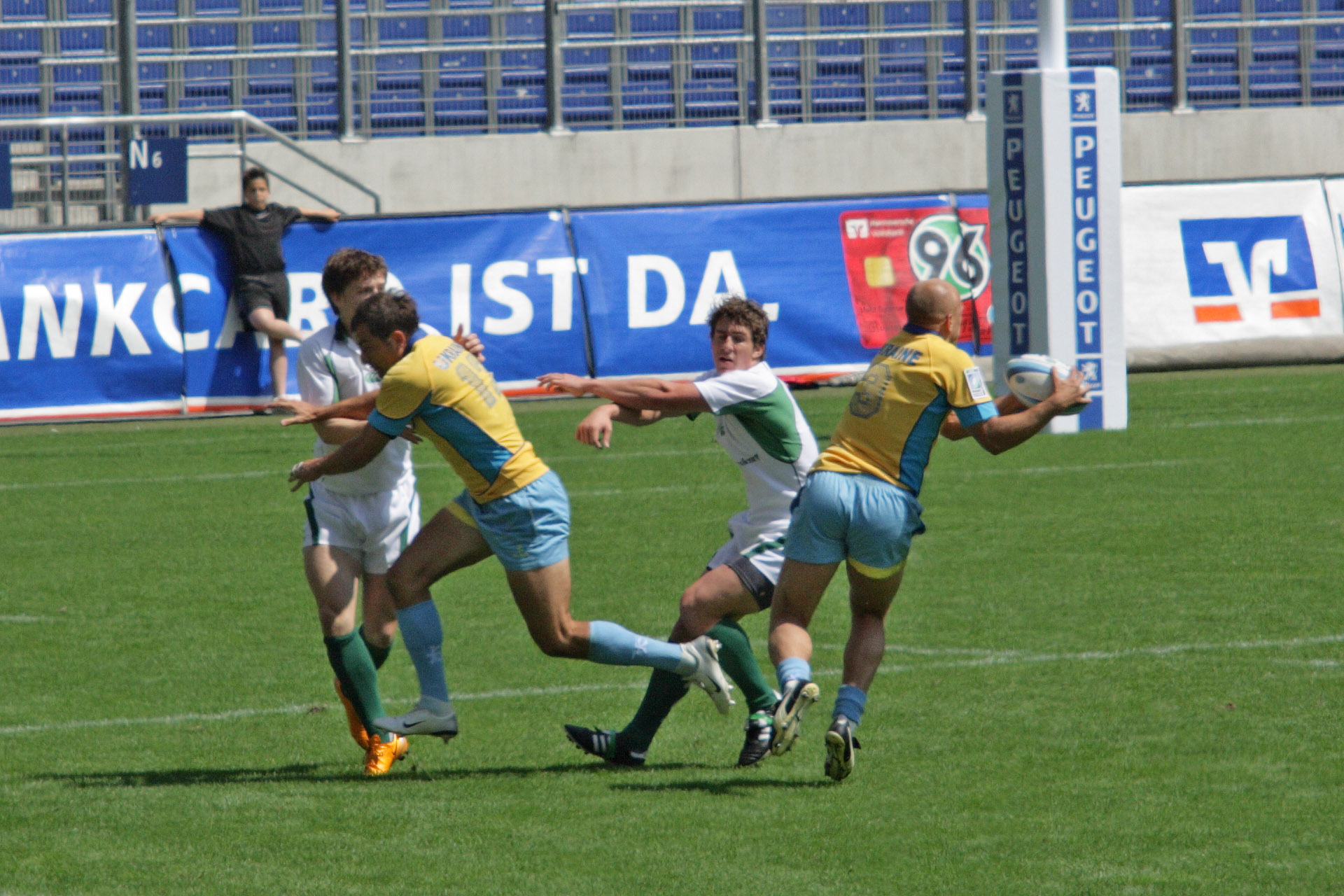
Ireland defeated Ukraine 26–7 at the group stages of the 2008 European Championship

Although Rugby Europe has held a rugby sevens championship every year since 2002, Ireland rarely participated from 2002 to 2014. Ireland participated only twice during those 13 years − in 2004 and 2008, both of which served as European regional qualifying tournaments for the following year's Rugby World Cup Sevens. Ireland finished third in the 2004 competition to qualify for the 2005 World Cup. Ireland finished fourth in the 2008 competition to qualify for the 2009 World Cup.

=== 2015−present ===
The 2015 European competitions also doubled as qualifying for the 2016 Summer Olympics. Ireland played in the Division C tournament on 6–7 June and won the tournament with a 6–0 record, its closest match being the 38–10 quarterfinal win over Austria, qualifying for Division B. Ireland then played the Division B tournament on 20–21 June, and won Division B with a 6–0 record, its closest match being a 54–0 pool-play win over Slovenia, qualifying for the final repechage tournament.

Ireland played in the 2015 repechage on 18–19 July where they faced a tougher level of competition. Ireland went 2-1-0 in the repechage pool play to win its group and reach the knockout rounds. Ireland lost to Russia in the semifinals, 10–24, but defeated Georgia 15–7 to take third place and secure the last qualifying spot for the final cross-continental Olympic qualifying tournament. They lost in these quarterfinals to Spain and did not make the 2016 Summer Olympics medal round.

The 2016 Trophy competition consisted of two tournaments – Malmo and Prague. Ireland went 6–0 to win the 2016 Malmo tournament, with the closest match being the 26–12 semifinal win over Ukraine. Ireland next won the 2016 Prague tournament, again with a perfect 6–0 record, with the closest match being the 24–0 semifinal win over Romania. Ireland finished first in the 2016 Trophy competition and won promotion to the 2017 Grand Prix series.

The 2017 Grand Prix series consisted of four tournaments. Ireland began the Grand Prix by winning the 2017 Moscow Sevens with a 5–1 record, defeating Russia 28–21 in the semifinals and Spain 12–0 in the finals. Next, Ireland finished third in the 2017 Lodz Sevens with a 5–1 record, losing to Russia 19–26 in the semifinals. Ireland next won the 2017 Clermont-Ferrand Sevens with a 6–0 record, defeating Russia 17–14 in the final. In the fourth and final tournament, the 2017 Exeter Sevens, Ireland finished with a 5–1 record, losing to Wales 12–15 in the semifinals. Ireland finished the 2017 Sevens Grand Prix Series in second place two points behind Russia, thereby qualifying for the 2018 Rugby World Cup Sevens, and advancing to the 2018 Hong Kong Sevens qualifying tournament for the 2018-19 World Series.

In the 2018 Europe Grand Prix Series, Ireland started strong, winning the 2018 Moscow Sevens with a 6–0 record, winning all six matches by a margin of more than 20 points.

Having not participated in Rugby Europe Sevens since 2019, Ireland returned to the Trophy Series by winning the opening leg of the Series in Zagreb, defeating England in the final. The following week they claimed the 2022 Rugby Europe Sevens Trophy and sealed their promotion back to the Rugby Europe Championship by winning all six matches of the Budapest leg, defeating England in the final 35–14. Ireland won the first leg of the 2023 Championship tournament defeating Georgia in the Algarve final, 19–10. Ireland earned a third-place finish at the Hamburg event, thereby clinching the 2023 Rugby Europe Sevens Championship.

== Other international tournaments ==
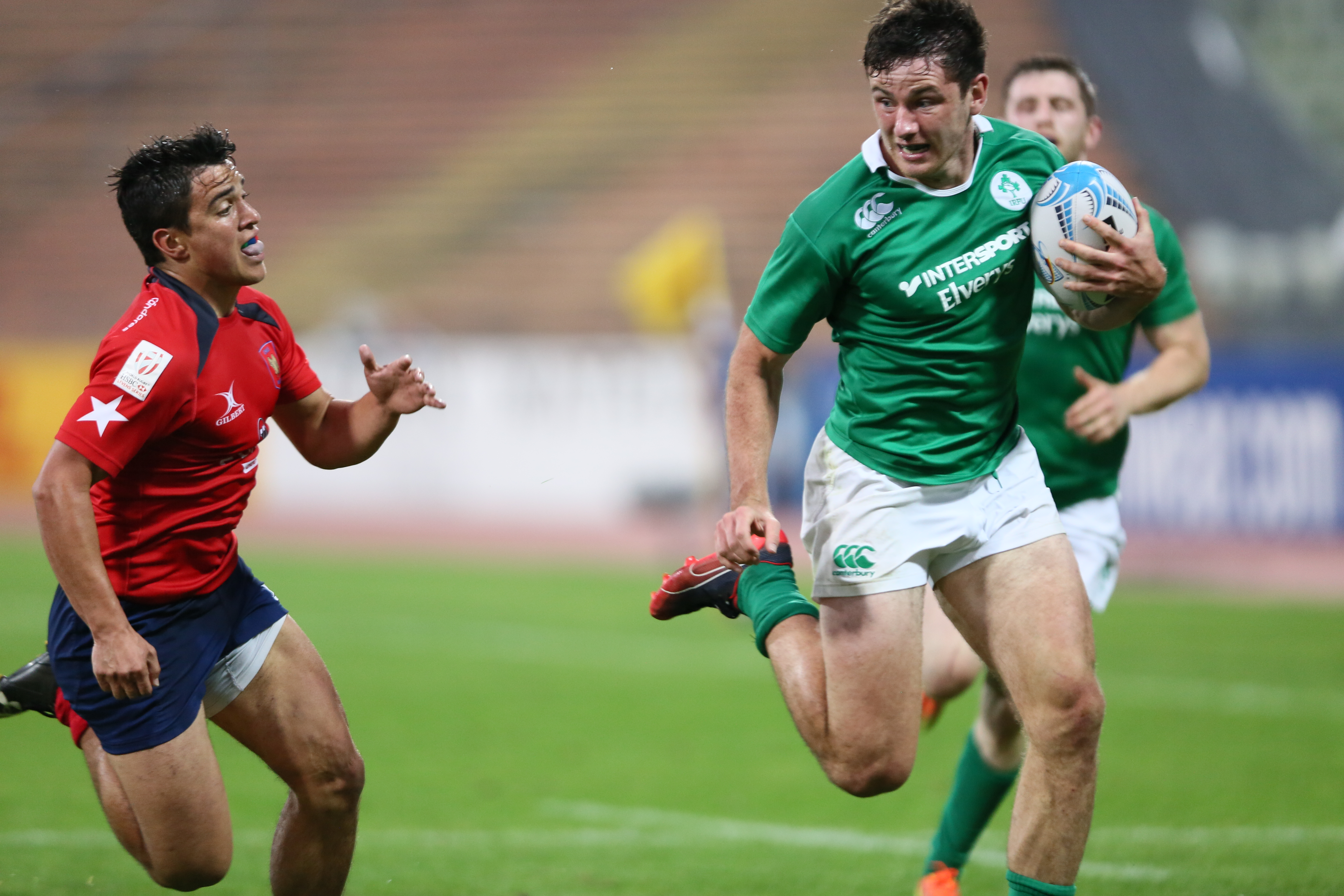
Ireland defeated Chile at the 2017 Oktoberfest 7s tournament.

Ireland at International Tournaments
Tournament	Position	GP	W	D	L	Win %	PF	PA	Diff
(Scotland) 1973 International Seven-a-side Tournament	2nd	5	4	0	1	80%	80	56	+24
1993 Hong Kong Sevens	Cup Quarterfinals	3	2	0	1	66.67%	43	22	+21
1994 Hong Kong Sevens	Plate Quarterfinals	3	1	0	2	33.33%	59	36	+23
1995 Hong Kong Sevens	Plate Quarterfinals	3	0	1	2	0%	45	57	–12
1995 Melun Sevens		4	1	0	3	25%	85	117	–32
1996 Hong Kong Sevens	Cup Quarterfinals	4	2	1	1	50%	78	83	–5
1999 Hong Kong Sevens	Plate Quarterfinals	4	2	0	2	50%	59	87	–28
(France) 1999 Paris Sevens	Bowl Quarterfinals	4	0	0	4	0%	43	117	–74
(Spain) 2015 Elche Invitational	3rd	5	2	0	3	40%	101	107	–6
(Germany) 2017 Oktoberfest Sevens	7th	6	2	0	4	33.33%	52	95	–43
(Spain) 2017 Elche Invitational	2nd	6	4	0	2	66.67%	145	50	+95
(United States) 2017 Silicon Valley Sevens	9th	5	3	0	2	66.67%	81	53	+28
(Uruguay) (Chile) 2018 Sudamérica Rugby Sevens	5th	12	8	1	3	66.67%	249	126	+123
(Spain) 2019 Elche Invitational	2nd	6	5	0	1	83.33%	147	70	+77
(England) 2019 Rugby X Tournament	Runner-up	4	3	0	1	75%	95	65	+30
(England) 2021 International Rugby 7s	1st	6	4	0	2	66.67%	107	62	+45
Total	—N/a	80	43	3	34	53.75%	1469	1203	+266

The results listed above are inclusive of tournaments played outside of the World Rugby Sevens Series, Olympics, Rugby World Cup Sevens and the Rugby Europe Sevens tournaments.

== Ireland Wolfhounds ==
An Irish Wolfhounds side, often composed of both Irish and English rugby internationals, competed at many of the Hong Kong Sevens events between 1984 and 1992. This team was not an official representative side. Nonetheless, they achieved moderate success reaching several Cup quarterfinals. The Wolfhounds also won the 1991 Melrose Sevens, an annual sevens competition contested by club sides. In 2015 the Wolfhounds returned as an 'A' side to help strengthen the national sevens player pool. The side competed in the GB7s tour against club competition.

Ireland Wolfhounds at International Tournaments
Tournament	Position	GP	W	D	L	Win %	PF	PA	Diff
1984 Hong Kong Sevens	Cup Semifinals	2	1	0	1	50%	30	16	+14
1985 Hong Kong Sevens	Cup Quarterfinals	3	2	0	1	66.67%	60	44	+16
1988 Hong Kong Sevens	Cup Quarterfinals	3	2	0	1	66.67%	42	52	–10
1989 Hong Kong Sevens	Cup Quarterfinals	3	2	0	1	66.67%	62	28	+34
(Italy) 1991 Sicily Sevens	—N/a	1	1	0	0	100%	22	4	+18
1992 Hong Kong Sevens	Plate Semifinals	4	2	0	2	50%	62	44	+18
(Portugal) 1993 Lisbon Sevens	—N/a	1	0	0	1	0%	10	19	–9
(France) 1994 Besagne Sevens	—N/a	1	0	1	0	0%	12	12	0
Total	—N/a	18	10	1	7	55.56%	300	219	+81

Updated as of 4 March 2021.

== Overall Record ==
Tournament	GP	W	D	L	Win %	PF	PA	Diff
World Rugby Sevens Series	261	124	8	129	47.51%	4737	4575	+162
World Series Qualifier	11	9	1	1	81.82%	327	72	+255
Olympics	11	5	0	6	45.45%	175	155	+20
Olympic Qualifiers	29	23	2	4	79.31%	773	306	+467
Rugby World Cup Sevens	44	22	1	21	50%	774	871	–97
World Cup Qualifiers	18	15	1	2	83.33%	658	144	+514
Rugby Europe Sevens	159	138	1	20	86.79%	4,945	1,182	+3763
Other International Tournaments	80	43	3	34	53.75%	1469	1203	+266
Total	613	379	17	217	61.83%	13,858	8,508	+5,350

The above records are up to date as of 27 July 2024.
These records do not include matches played as the Ireland Wolfhounds.

=== Head to Head ===
Opponent	Played	Won	Drawn	Lost	Win %	For	Aga	Diff
Arabian Gulf	2	2	0	0	100%	65	22	+43
Argentina	30	9	0	21	30%	428	616	–188
Argentina VII	3	2	0	1	66.67%	33	60	–27
Australia	25	11	0	14	44%	402	516	–114
Austria	5	5	0	0	100%	247	22	+225
Belarus	1	1	0	0	100%	60	0	+60
Belgium	9	9	0	0	100%	317	50	+267
Bosnia and Herzegovina	2	2	0	0	100%	107	0	+107
Brazil	2	0	1	1	0%	26	31	–5
Bulgaria	2	2	0	0	100%	102	0	+102
Canada	16	8	0	8	50%	296	254	+42
Canada Maple Leafs	1	1	0	0	100%	33	5	+28
Chile	2	2	0	0	100%	67	19	+48
China	1	1	0	0	100%	31	7	+24
Colombia	1	1	0	0	100%	33	7	+26
Cook Islands	1	1	0	0	100%	41	5	+36
Croatia	5	5	0	0	100%	230	0	+230
Cyprus	3	3	0	0	100%	129	12	+117
Czech Republic	3	3	0	0	100%	132	19	+113
Denmark	5	5	0	0	100%	201	12	+189
England	16	12	0	4	75%	366	229	+137
Fiji	20	3	0	17	15%	261	602	–341
France	30	13	0	17	43.33%	523	474	+49
Emerging France	1	0	0	1	0%	12	15	–3
Georgia	11	8	0	3	72.73%	170	153	+17
Germany	21	17	1	3	80.95%	527	206	+321
Great Britain	25	14	2	9	56%	391	333	+58
Hong Kong	7	5	0	2	71.43%	126	95	+31
Hungary	3	3	0	0	100%	172	0	+172
Israel	4	4	0	0	100%	143	26	+117
Italy	12	9	0	3	75%	311	142	+169
Jamaica	5	5	0	0	100%	162	7	+155
Japan	13	10	0	3	76.92%	402	117	+285
Kenya	15	10	1	4	66.67%	290	243	+47
Latvia	3	3	0	0	100%	112	10	+102
Lithuania	2	2	0	0	100%	45	0	+45
Malaysia	1	1	0	0	100%	31	12	+19
Malta	1	1	0	0	100%	76	0	+76
Mexico	1	1	0	0	100%	31	0	+31
Monaco	2	2	0	0	100%	99	5	+94
Montenegro	1	1	0	0	100%	59	5	+54
Morocco	2	2	0	0	100%	51	38	+13
Netherlands	2	2	0	0	100%	77	0	+77
New Zealand	20	2	0	18	10%	255	512	–257
Norway	1	1	0	0	100%	73	0	+73
Paraguay	1	1	0	0	100%	43	0	+43
Poland	10	10	0	0	100%	401	27	+374
Poland B	1	1	0	0	100%	33	0	+33
Portugal	24	20	1	3	83.33%	574	266	+308
Romania	5	5	0	0	100%	181	26	+155
Russia	13	8	1	4	61.54%	331	194	+137
Samoa	15	9	0	6	60%	249	243	+6
Scotland	9	6	0	3	66.67%	205	160	+45
Serbia	1	1	0	0	100%	74	0	+74
Serbia and Montenegro	1	1	0	0	100%	28	10	+18
Slovenia	2	2	0	0	100%	113	0	+113
South Africa	27	10	1	16	37.04%	339	528	–189
South Africa Academy	2	1	0	1	50%	24	36	–12
South Korea	4	3	1	0	75%	95	48	+47
Spain	24	16	2	6	66.67%	509	283	+226
Sweden	6	6	0	0	100%	258	15	+243
Switzerland	2	2	0	0	100%	73	14	+59
Chinese Taipei	2	2	0	0	100%	36	24	+12
Thailand	1	1	0	0	100%	56	0	+56
Tonga	4	4	0	0	100%	112	31	+81
Tunisia	1	0	0	1	0%	5	17	–12
Turkey	2	2	0	0	100%	84	5	+79
Uganda	1	1	0	0	100%	33	15	+18
Ukraine	4	4	0	0	100%	143	24	+119
United States	23	13	1	9	56.52%	432	319	+113
Uruguay	7	5	1	1	71.43%	145	72	+73
Wales	14	9	1	4	64.29%	330	207	+123
Zimbabwe	4	3	0	1	75%	107	44	+63
Total	548	350	14	184	63.87%	12,758	7,489	+5,269

Results are inclusive of all international competitions.
Updated as of 27 July 2024

== Honours ==
1973 International Seven-a-side Tournament

- Runner-up: 1973

Rugby World Cup Sevens

- Third-place: 1993, 2022

SVNS

- Runner-up: 2023–24 (League)

Australian Sevens

- Third-place: 2024

Dubai Sevens

- Runner-up: 2022

France Sevens

- Runner-up: 2022

Hong Kong Sevens

- Third-place: 2024

London Sevens

- Third-place: 2018

Singapore Sevens

- Runner-up: 2024

USA Sevens

Third-place: 2024

World Series qualifier

- Winners: 2019

Rugby Europe Sevens

- Winners: 2018, 2023
- Runner-up: 2017, 2024
- Third-place: 2004, 2019

Rugby Europe Sevens Trophy

- Winners: 2016, 2022

Rugby Europe Sevens Division B

- Winners: 2015

Rugby Europe Sevens Division C

- Winners: 2015

European Games

- Winners: 2023

Elche Invitational

- Runner-up: 2017, 2019
- Third-place: 2015

International Rugby 7s

- Winners: 2021

== Player records ==
=== World Series (career) ===
Most matches
No.	Player	Years	Matches
1	Harry McNulty	2018–	181
2	Mark Roche	2018–	173
3	Jordan Conroy	2018–	171
4	Jack Kelly	2019–	157
5	Billy Dardis	2018–	154

Most tries
No.	Player	Years	Tries
1	Jordan Conroy	2018–	123
2	Terry Kennedy	2018–	110
3	Zac Ward	2021–	41
4	Jack Kelly	2019–	35
5	Harry McNulty	2018–	31

Most points
No.	Player	Years	Points
1	Jordan Conroy	2018–	615
2	Terry Kennedy	2018–	550
3	Mark Roche	2018–	400
4	Billy Dardis	2018–	392
5	Hugo Lennox	2018–	215

The tables above show players career statistics from the World Rugby Sevens Series main tournament up to 5 June 2024.

The Irish record holders in the World Series for the era preceding the Olympics and professional era of rugby sevens are:

- Most matches: Aidan Kearney (13)
- Most tries: James Topping (13)
- Most points: James Topping (67)

=== World Series (season) ===
Most tries
No.	Player	Season	Tries	Series Rank
1	Terry Kennedy	2021–22	50	1st
2	Jordan Conroy	2022–23	32	8th
3	Terry Kennedy	2023–24	32	1st
4	Jordan Conroy	2019–20	30	1st
5	Zac Ward	2023–24	25	5th

Most points
No.	Player	Season	Tries	Series Rank
1	Terry Kennedy	2021–22	250	2nd
2	Jordan Conroy	2022–23	160	15th
3	Terry Kennedy	2023–24	160	1st
4	Mark Roche	2022–23	152	21st
5	Jordan Conroy	2019–20	150	2nd

=== World Cup ===
Most matches
No.	Player	Years	Matches
1	Denis McBride	1993–1997	15
2	Richard Wallace	1993–1997	14
3	Terry Kennedy	2018–2022	10
3	Jordan Conroy	2018–2022	10
3	Harry McNulty	2018–2022	10
3	Billy Dardis	2018–2022	10

Most tries
No.	Player	Years	Tries
1	Richard Wallace	1993–1997	10
2	Jordan Conroy	2018–2022	7
3	Andy Maxwell	2005	6
3	Ian Humphreys	2005	6
5	Three players tied with five		

Most points
No.	Player	Years	Points
1	Eric Elwood	1993	60
2	Richard Wallace	1993–1997	54
3	Ian Humphreys	2005	44
4	Billy Dardis	2018–2022	38
5	Jordan Conroy	2018–2022	35

Most tackles
No.	Player	Years	Tackles
1	Hugo Keenan	2018	21
2	Harry McNulty	2018–2022	17
3	Billy Dardis	2018–2022	15
4	Terry Kennedy	2018–2022	14
5	Two players tied with eight		

The tables above show players career statistics from the Rugby World Rugby Cup Sevens up to 11 September 2022.

=== Award winners ===
The following Ireland Sevens players have been recognised at the World Rugby Awards since 2004:

World Rugby Men's 7s Player of the Year
Year	Nominees	Winners
2022	Terry Kennedy	Terry Kennedy
2024	Terry Kennedy (2)	—

World Rugby Men's 7s Dream Team
Year	No.	Player
2024	4.	Terry Kennedy

=== Other notable players ===
British & Irish Lions

- Tadhg Beirne
- Vince Cunningham
- Mick Galwey
- Mike Gibson
- Denis Hickie
- Eric Miller
- Tomás O'Leary
- Fergus Slattery
- Richard Wallace

Ireland internationals

- Robert Baloucoune
- Tadhg Beirne
- Jonny Bell
- Vincent Becker
- Adam Byrne
- Kieran Campbell
- Donal Canniffe
- Brian Carney
- Darren Cave
- Ben Cronin
- Vince Cunningham
- Shane Daly
- Kieron Dawson
- Seamus Dennison
- Eric Elwood
- Mick Galwey
- Mike Gibson
- Chris Henry
- David Humphreys
- Paddy Johns
- Felix Jones
- Ian Keatley
- Hugo Keenan
- Niall Malone
- Paul Marshall
- Kevin Mays
- Denis McBride
- Aidan McCullen
- Wallace McMaster
- Eric Miller
- Terry Moore
- Matt Mostyn
- Jimmy O'Brien
- Tomás O'Leary
- David Quinlan
- Alain Rolland
- Fergus Slattery
- Nick Timoney
- James Topping
- Richard Wallace
- Pa Whelan
- Niall Woods

(Ireland) IRFU referees

- John Lacey
- Alain Rolland

== Head coaches ==
Coach	Tenure	Best Series	Best Series Tournament	Olympics	World Cup
(Wales) Ray Southam	1997	Not held	Not held	Not held	1997: 19th
(Ireland) Denis McBride	1999–2002	17th (2000–01)	9th (2000 London)	Not held	2001: 19th
(Australia) Ryan Constable	2004–2005	—N/a	14th (2004 Dubai)	Not held	2005: 13th
(Ireland) Jon Skurr	2008–2009	Did not appear	Did not appear	Not held	2009: 18th
(Australia) Anthony Eddy	2015–2022	6th (2021)	3rd (2018 London)	2016: DNQ; 2020: 10th	2018: 9th
(Ireland) James Topping	2022–2025	2nd (2023–24 League)	2nd (2022 France; 2022 Dubai; 2024 Singapore)	2024: 6th	2022: 3rd
