= Tafadzwa Manyimo =

Zimbabwean cricketer (born 1977)

Tafadzwa Manyimo (born March 17, 1977) was a Zimbabwean cricketer. He was a right-handed batsman and a right-arm medium-pace bowler. He was born in Bulawayo.

Manyimo made his debut first-class appearance for a Matabeleland Select XI during a Yorkshire tour of Zimbabwe just before the beginning of the 1996 English cricket season, a match which Yorkshire won by an innings margin.

Manyimo made his only Logan Cup appearance in the final of the 1995/96 competition. While Matabeleland won the match by a comfortable margin, Manyimo scored a duck in the only innings in which he batted.

Manyimo also played rugby union, representing Zimbabwe Sevens at the 2001 Rugby World Cup Sevens.
