= Max McFarland =

Scottish rugby union player (born 1993)

- Born: Max McFarland; 13 July 1993 (age 33) London
- Height: 1.75 m (5 ft 9 in)
- Weight: 84 kg (13 st 3 lb)
- School: Clongowes Wood College
- University: Trinity College Dublin

Rugby union career
- Position: Wing
- Current team: Great Britain Rugby 7s
Amateur team(s)
Years	Team	Apps	(Points)
2012 -2016	DUFC		
–	Clontarf		
2014, 2016	Edinburgh		
2017	Munster		
2017–	Glasgow Warriors		
National sevens team
Years	Team		Comps
2014–2024	Scotland 7s & Great Britain 7s		50
Medal record
Men's rugby sevens
Representing Great Britain
European Games
Silver medal – second place	2023 Kraków–Małopolska	Team competition

Max McFarland (born 13 July 1993) is a Scottish rugby union player who has excelled at both 15s and 7s levels. Known for his versatility, McFarland has played in a variety of positions, including back three and scrum-half. McFarland was born in London, and qualified to play for Scotland through his Glaswegian grandfather Tom Laidlaw.

== Early life ==
McFarland's rugby journey began at Headfort School and Clongowes Wood College, two institutions with a strong tradition of producing rugby talent. Before turning professional, he gained valuable experience playing for Navan RFC, DUFC, and Clontarf RFC in the All-Ireland League. McFarland achieved notable success during his youth, winning the Leinster Schools senior cup with Clongowes and an All-Ireland league medal with Clontarf. He also played a crucial role in Trinity Rugby's promotion to the AIL 1A, scoring match-winning tries in both the semi-final and final against Ballynahinch and Ballymena. Before turning professional, McFarland scored a hattrick against the Barbarian Football Club and also represented Watsonians RFC.

== Professional career ==
McFarland's professional career took off when he joined the Leinster Rugby underage system and the academy. He later made the move to Edinburgh Rugby in 2014. He had a brief stint with Munster Rugby, gaining further experience and exposure. In November 2017, McFarland signed for Glasgow Warriors.

== International career ==
Born in London, McFarland qualified to play for Scotland through his grandfather Tom Kennedy Laidlaw who was born in Glasgow. McFarland's international career began with Scotland 7s. McFarland was called up to the Scotland 7s squad for the 2014 Sevens Grand Prix Series in Manchester where he made his international debut.

He represented his country in numerous World Series tournaments and the Commonwealth Games. His exceptional skills and athleticism earned him a place in the Scotland 7s squad for the 2018 Rugby World Cup Sevens.

McFarland established himself as one of the top points and try scorers in the history of Scotland rugby 7s. His contributions to the team's success were invaluable, and he became a fan favorite for his electrifying performances on the field.

One of the most significant moments in McFarland's career came in 2021 when he was selected to represent Team GB at the Tokyo Olympics where the team finished 4th. McFarland represented the Barbarian Football Club in 2023.

He played for Great Britain 7s until 2024.
