= Rugby sevens at the 2023 European Games – Men's tournament =

Tournament details
- Host: Poland
- Venue: Stadion Miejski im. Henryka Reymana
- Date: 25–27 June
- Teams: 12

Final positions
- Champions: Ireland (1st title)
- Runner-up: Great Britain
- Third place: Spain
- Fourth place: Portugal

Tournament statistics
- Matches played: 34
- Tries scored: 203 (5.97 per match)
- Top scorer(s): (Spain) Juan Ramos (55 points)
- Most tries: (Spain) Pol Pla (8 tries)

The men's rugby sevens tournament at the 2023 European Games was held from 25 to 27 June at the Stadion Miejski im. Henryka Reymana in Kraków. This was the first time Rugby Sevens participated within the European Games and it also served as a qualification tournament for the 2024 Summer Olympics, with the winner of the tournament qualifying.

== Seeding ==
Teams were seeded following the serpentine system according to results of first leg of the 2023 Rugby Europe Sevens Championship Series.

Pool A	Pool B	Pool C
Ireland (1)	Georgia (2)	Great Britain (4)
Germany (7)	Spain (6)	Portugal (5)
Italy (8)	Belgium (9)	Lithuania (10)
Poland (–)	Czechia (12)	Romania (11)

== Pool stage ==
All times are local (UTC+2).

=== Pool A ===
Pos	Team	Pld	W	D	L	PF	PA	PD	Pts	Qualification
1	Ireland	3	3	0	0	123	14	+109	9	Quarterfinals
2	Germany	3	1	1	1	71	38	+33	6	Quarterfinals
3	Italy	3	1	1	1	76	57	+19	6	Quarterfinals
4	Poland (H)	3	0	0	3	0	161	−161	3	

Source: EG2023
Rules for classification: 1) points; 2) head-to-head points; 3) head-to-head goal difference; 4) head-to-head number of goals scored; 5) goal difference.
(H) Hosts

25 June
13:58

Germany	19–19	Italy
	Report

Stadion Miejski im. Henryka Reymana, Kraków

25 June
14:20

Ireland	66–0	Poland
	Report

Stadion Miejski im. Henryka Reymana, Kraków

25 June
19:58

Ireland	38–7	Italy
	Report

Stadion Miejski im. Henryka Reymana, Kraków

25 June
20:20

Germany	47–0	Poland
	Report

Stadion Miejski im. Henryka Reymana, Kraków

26 June
13:58

Ireland	19–7	Germany
	Report

Stadion Miejski im. Henryka Reymana, Kraków

26 June
14:20

Italy	50–0	Poland
	Report

Stadion Miejski im. Henryka Reymana, Kraków

=== Pool B ===
Pos	Team	Pld	W	D	L	PF	PA	PD	Pts	Qualification
1	Spain	3	3	0	0	101	33	+68	9	Quarterfinals
2	Georgia	3	2	0	1	38	56	−18	7	Quarterfinals
3	Belgium	3	1	0	2	59	47	+12	5	Quarterfinals
4	Czechia	3	0	0	3	35	97	−62	3	

Source: EG2023
Rules for classification: 1) points; 2) head-to-head points; 3) head-to-head goal difference; 4) head-to-head number of goals scored; 5) goal difference.

25 June
12:30

Spain	26–12	Belgium
	Report

Stadion Miejski im. Henryka Reymana, Kraków

25 June
12:52

Georgia	17–14	Czechia
	Report

Stadion Miejski im. Henryka Reymana, Kraków

25 June
18:30

Georgia	14–7	Belgium
	Report

Stadion Miejski im. Henryka Reymana, Kraków

25 June
18:52

Spain	40–14	Czechia
	Report

Stadion Miejski im. Henryka Reymana, Kraków

26 June
12:30

Georgia	7–35	Spain
	Report

Stadion Miejski im. Henryka Reymana, Kraków

26 June
12:52

Belgium	40–7	Czechia
	Report

Stadion Miejski im. Henryka Reymana, Kraków

=== Pool C ===
Pos	Team	Pld	W	D	L	PF	PA	PD	Pts	Qualification
1	Great Britain	3	3	0	0	100	5	+95	9	Quarterfinals
2	Portugal	3	2	0	1	88	50	+38	7	Quarterfinals
3	Lithuania	3	1	0	2	36	72	−36	5	
4	Romania	3	0	0	3	17	114	−97	3	

Source: EG2023
Rules for classification: 1) points; 2) head-to-head points; 3) head-to-head goal difference; 4) head-to-head number of goals scored; 5) goal difference.

25 June
13:14

Portugal	38–12	Lithuania
	Report

Stadion Miejski im. Henryka Reymana, Kraków

25 June
13:36

Great Britain	45–0	Romania
	Report

Stadion Miejski im. Henryka Reymana, Kraków

25 June
19:14

Great Britain	24–0	Lithuania
	Report

Stadion Miejski im. Henryka Reymana, Kraków

25 June
19:36

Portugal	45–7	Romania
	Report

Stadion Miejski im. Henryka Reymana, Kraków

26 June
13:14

Great Britain	31–5	Portugal
	Report

Stadion Miejski im. Henryka Reymana, Kraków

26 June
13:36

Lithuania	24–10	Romania
	Report

Stadion Miejski im. Henryka Reymana, Kraków

=== Ranking of third-placed teams ===
The top two of the third-placed teams advance to the knockout rounds.

Pos	Grp	Team	Pld	W	D	L	PF	PA	PD	Pts	Qualification
1	A	Italy	3	1	1	1	76	57	+19	6	Quarterfinals
2	B	Belgium	3	1	0	2	59	47	+12	5	Quarterfinals
3	C	Lithuania	3	1	0	2	36	72	−36	5	

Source: EG2023
Rules for classification: 1) Points; 2) Point difference; 3) Points scored.

== Knockout stage ==
=== 9–12th place playoff ===
9–12th place semifinals
26 June
Lithuania	33
Poland	10
26 June
Czechia	21
Romania	15

Ninth place match
27 June
Lithuania (a.e.t.)	24
Czechia	19
Eleventh place match
27 June
Poland	21
Romania	19

26 June
18:30

Lithuania	33–10	Poland
	Report

Stadion Miejski im. Henryka Reymana, Kraków

26 June
18:52

Czechia	21–15	Romania
	Report

Stadion Miejski im. Henryka Reymana, Kraków

27 June
13:35

Poland	21–19	Romania
	Report

Stadion Miejski im. Henryka Reymana, Kraków

27 June
13:57

Lithuania	24–19 (a.e.t.)	Czechia
	Report

Stadion Miejski im. Henryka Reymana, Kraków

=== 5–8th place playoff ===
5–8th place semifinals
27 June
Belgium	21
Georgia	5
27 June
Italy	19
Germany	21

Fifth place match
27 June
Belgium	24
Germany	0
Seventh place match
27 June
Georgia	19
Italy	7

27 June
14:19

Belgium	21–5	Georgia
	Report

Stadion Miejski im. Henryka Reymana, Kraków

27 June
14:41

Italy	19–21	Germany
	Report

Stadion Miejski im. Henryka Reymana, Kraków

27 June
19:07

Georgia	19–7	Italy
	Report

Stadion Miejski im. Henryka Reymana, Kraków

27 June
19:51

Belgium	24–0	Germany
	Report

Stadion Miejski im. Henryka Reymana, Kraków

=== Medal playoff ===
Quarterfinals
26 June
Ireland	26
Belgium	12
26 June
Georgia	5
Portugal	31
26 June
Spain	36
Italy	7
26 June
Great Britain	14
Germany	10

Semifinals
27 June
Ireland	24
Portugal	0
27 June
Spain	7
Great Britain	19

Gold medal match
27 June
Ireland	26
Great Britain	12
Bronze medal match
27 June
Portugal	0
Spain	42

==== Quarterfinals ====
26 June
19:14

Ireland	26–12	Belgium
Try: O'Grady 5' c Kennedy 7' c McNamara (2) 9' c, 12' m Con: Roche (3/4) 5', 7', 9'	Report	Try: Benoy 2' c Lalli 14' m Con: Remue (1/2) 3'; Cards: Bontems (yellow card) 8'

Stadion Miejski im. Henryka Reymana, Kraków
Referee: Jérémy Rozier (France)

26 June
19:36

Spain	36–7	Italy
Try: Serres 1' c López (2) 4' m, 7' m Pla 6' c Laforga (2) 12' m, 14' c Con: Ramos (3/6) 1', 7', 14+1'	Report	Try: Pani 9' c Con: Bonavolonta 9'

Stadion Miejski im. Henryka Reymana, Kraków
Referee: Adam Leal (England)

26 June
19:58

Great Britain	14–10	Germany
Try: McFarland 2' c T. Williams 8' c Con: Emery (2/2) 2', 9'	Report	Try: Lichtenberg 7+2' m P. Gleitze 13' m Con: Klewinghaus (0/2)

Stadion Miejski im. Henryka Reymana, Kraków
Referee: Paulo Duarte (Portugal)

26 June
20:20

Georgia	5–31	Portugal
Try: Lomidze 14' m Con: Lomidze (0/1)	Report	Try: Antunes 1' c Couto 2' c Marta 5' c Rodrigues 7+1' m Câmara 11' m Con: Marta (3/5) 2', 3', 5'

Stadion Miejski im. Henryka Reymana, Kraków
Referee: Gianluca Gnecchi (Italy)

==== Semifinals ====
27 June
15:03

Ireland	24–0	Portugal
Try: Dardis (2) 5' c, 6' c Ward 9' m Conroy 11' m Con: Dardis (2/4) 5', 6'	Report	Cards: Dos Santos (yellow card) 10'

Stadion Miejski im. Henryka Reymana, Kraków
Referee: Adam Leal (England)

27 June
15:25

Spain	7–19	Great Britain
Try: Pla 2' c Con: Ramos (1/1) 2'	Report	Try: McFarland 3' c T. Williams 6' m Farndale 10' c Con: Emery (2/3) 4', 11'

Stadion Miejski im. Henryka Reymana, Kraków
Referee: Gianluca Gnecchi (Italy)

==== Bronze medal match ====
27 June
20:35

Portugal	0–42	Spain
	Report	Try: Pla (2) 2' c, 10' c Serres 3' c Ramos (2) 6' c, 7'+2 c Laforga 13' c Con: Ramos (6/6) 3', 4', 6', 7+2', 11', 14'

Stadion Miejski im. Henryka Reymana, Kraków
Referee: Adam Leal (England)

==== Gold medal match ====
27 June
21:35

Ireland	26–12	Great Britain
Try: Dardis 4' c Kennedy 7+2' c Conroy (2) 12' c, 14' m Con: Dardis (2/2) 4', 7+3'; Roche (1/2) 13'; Cards: Mollen (yellow card) 14+2'	Report	Try: T. Williams 7' c Sofolarin 14+2' m Con: Barreto (1/1) 7'; Roddick (0/1); Cards: Fergusson (yellow card) 7+2'

Stadion Miejski im. Henryka Reymana, Kraków
Referee: Jérémy Rozier (France)

== Final standings ==
Rank	Team	Matches	W	D	L	Points	Tries
1st place, gold medalist(s)	Ireland	6	6	0	0	199	31
2nd place, silver medalist(s)	Great Britain	6	5	0	1	145	23
3rd place, bronze medalist(s)	Spain	6	5	0	1	186	28
4	Portugal	6	3	0	3	119	19
5	Belgium	6	3	0	3	116	18
6	Germany	6	2	1	3	102	16
7	Georgia	6	3	0	3	67	11
8	Italy	6	1	1	4	109	17
9	Lithuania	5	3	0	2	93	15
10	Czechia	5	1	0	4	75	11
11	Poland	5	1	0	4	31	5
12	Romania	5	0	0	5	51	9

== See also ==
- Rugby sevens at the 2023 European Games – Women's tournament
