= 2022 Rugby World Cup Sevens =

Rugby world championship

Tournament details
- Host nation: South Africa
- Venue: Cape Town Stadium, Cape Town
- Dates: 9 September – 11 September
- No. of nations: 24 (men); 16 (women)

Final positions
- Champions: Fiji (men); Australia (women)

Tournament statistics
- Attendance: 105,000
- Tries scored: 457
- Points scored: 2,821

The 2022 Rugby World Cup Sevens was the eighth and final edition of the Rugby World Cup Sevens organised by World Rugby. The 2022 tournament, comprising 24 men's and 16 women's teams as previously, was played over three days in one venue in September. It took place at the Cape Town Stadium in Cape Town, South Africa between 9 and 11 September 2022. It was the first Rugby World Cup Sevens in Africa. The dates were chosen to take into account in the Commonwealth Games tournament which took place in July the same year.

== Bidding ==
A record 11 unions formally expressed interest in hosting Rugby World Cup Sevens 2022. The unions were issued formal bid application documents by World Rugby and had to submit their responses by 16 July 2019. South Africa was awarded the rights to host the tournament on 29 October 2019.

- Argentina
- Cayman Islands
- France
- Germany
- India
- Jamaica
- Malaysia
- Qatar
- Scotland
- South Africa
- Tunisia

== Venue ==
The tournament took place at the Cape Town Stadium in Cape Town.

The 55,000-capacity stadium was the same venue that hosted the Cape Town Sevens since 2015, and for the first time that year hosted both men's and women's teams across three days of competition as part of the new-look World Rugby Sevens Series.

The 2022 tournament followed a Rugby World Cup Sevens 2018 in San Francisco which attracted a record attendance for a rugby event in the United States of more than 100,000 fans, as well as a huge domestic broadcast audience of more than nine million viewers. The 2018 event, hosted at AT&T Park, generated a US$90.5 million economic contribution to San Francisco (Nielsen Sport) and saw both New Zealand's men's and women's teams retain the title.

Cape Town	Location of 2022 Rugby World Cup Sevens
Cape Town Stadium	Location of 2022 Rugby World Cup Sevens
Capacity: 55,000	Location of 2022 Rugby World Cup Sevens

== Schedule ==
The tournament was played for 3 days between 9 and 11 September.

== Qualifying ==
=== Men ===
The eight quarter-finalists from the 2018 Rugby World Cup Sevens, including the 2022 tournament host South Africa, were automatic qualifiers. The remaining 16 places were decided from the six continental regions.

Region	Automatic qualifiers	Continental qualifiers	Total teams
Africa	South Africa (hosts)	Uganda; Zimbabwe; Kenya	4
North America	United States	Canada; Jamaica	3
South America	Argentina	Chile; Uruguay	3
Asia	—	Hong Kong; South Korea	2
Europe	England; France; Scotland	Germany; Ireland; Portugal; Wales	7
Oceania	Fiji; New Zealand (holders)	Australia; Samoa; Tonga	5
Totals	8	16	24

=== Women ===
The four semifinalists from the 2018 Rugby World Cup Sevens were automatic qualifiers, with South Africa also qualifying as host. The remaining eleven places were decided from the six continental regions.

Region	Automatic qualifiers	Continental qualifiers	Total teams
Africa	South Africa (hosts)	Madagascar	2
North America	United States	Canada	2
South America	—	Brazil; Colombia	2
Asia	—	China; Japan	2
Europe	France	England; Ireland; Poland; Spain	5
Oceania	Australia; New Zealand (holders)	Fiji	3
Totals	5	11	16

== Tournament ==
=== Men ===
Event	Winners	Score	Finalists	Semi-finalists
Melrose Cup	Fiji	29–12	New Zealand	Ireland (3) Australia
5th Place	Argentina	10–7	France	South Africa (7) Samoa
Challenge Trophy	England	28–5	Uruguay	United States (11) Kenya
13th Place	Canada	12–10	Chile	Wales (15) Scotland
Bowl	Uganda	19–12	Germany	Hong Kong (19) Tonga
21st Place	South Korea	12–10	Portugal	Zimbabwe (23) Jamaica

=== Women ===
Event	Winners	Score	Finalists	Semi-finalists
World Cup	Australia	24–22	New Zealand	France (3) United States
5th Place	Fiji	53–0	Canada	Ireland (7) England
Challenge Trophy	Japan	17–12	Poland	Brazil (11) Spain
13th Place	China	21–19	South Africa	Madagascar (15) Colombia

== Attendance ==
More than 105,000 spectators attended the three-day tournament.
