= 2014 in rugby union =

Here are the match results of the 2014 Rugby union season. Qualifiers for the 2015 Rugby World Cup, meanwhile the Six Nations Championship and The Rugby Championship are set for another season.

== International tournaments ==
=== Worldwide ===
- October 10, 2013 – May 23, 2014: 2013–14 European Challenge Cup
- October 11, 2013 – May 24, 2014: 2013–14 Heineken Cup
- February 1 – March 15: 2014 Six Nations Championship
- February 15 – August 2: 2014 Super Rugby season
- April 7 – 19: 2014 IRB Junior World Rugby Trophy in Hong Kong
- August 1 – 17: 2014 Women's Rugby World Cup in France
- June 2 – 20: 2014 IRB Junior World Championship in New Zealand
- June 7 – 21: 2014 IRB Pacific Nations Cup
- August 16 – October 4: 2014 Rugby Championship

== Rugby sevens ==
- October 12, 2013 – May 11, 2014: 2013–14 IRB Sevens World Series
  - October 12 & 13, 2013: 2013 Gold Coast Sevens at Robina Stadium in (Australia) Gold Coast
    - Cup winner: New Zealand
    - Plate winner: Fiji
    - Bowl winner: France
    - Shield winner: United States
  - November 29 & 30, 2013: 2013 Dubai Sevens at the Sevens Stadium in (United Arab Emirates) Dubai
    - Cup winner: Fiji
    - Plate winner: Argentina
    - Bowl winner: Australia
    - Shield winner: France
  - December 7 & 8, 2013: 2013 South Africa Sevens at the Nelson Mandela Bay Stadium in Port Elizabeth
    - Cup winner: South Africa
    - Plate winner: Fiji
    - Bowl winner: England
    - Shield winner: Scotland
  - January 24 – 26, 2014: 2014 USA Sevens at the Sam Boyd Stadium in Las Vegas
    - Cup winner: South Africa
    - Plate winner: England
    - Bowl winner: Fiji
    - Shield winner: United States
  - February 7 & 8, 2014: 2014 Wellington Sevens at the Wellington Regional Stadium in Wellington
    - Cup winner: New Zealand
    - Plate winner: Australia
    - Bowl winner: Kenya
    - Shield winner: United States
  - March 22 & 23, 2014: 2014 Japan Sevens at the Chichibunomiya Rugby Stadium in Tokyo
    - Cup winner: Fiji
    - Plate winner: Australia
    - Bowl winner: Wales
    - Shield winner: Argentina
  - March 28 – 30, 2014: 2014 Hong Kong Sevens at the Hong Kong Stadium in Hong Kong
    - Cup winner: New Zealand
    - Plate winner: South Africa
    - Bowl winner: Scotland
    - Shield winner: Kenya
    - World Series Core Team Qualifier winner: Japan (becomes core team in the 2014–15 series)
  - May 3 & 4, 2014: 2014 Scotland Sevens at the Scotstoun Stadium in Glasgow
    - Cup winner: New Zealand
    - Plate winner: England
    - Bowl winner: France
    - Shield winner: Wales
  - May 10 & 11, 2014: 2014 London Sevens at Twickenham Stadium (final)
    - Cup winner: New Zealand
    - Plate winner: South Africa
    - Bowl winner: Canada
    - Shield winner: United States
- November 28, 2013 – May 17, 2014: 2013–14 IRB Women's Sevens World Series
  - November 28 & 29, 2013: 2013 Dubai Women's Sevens at the Sevens Stadium in (United Arab Emirates) Dubai
    - Cup winner: Australia
    - Plate winner: England
    - Bowl winner: Fiji
  - February 15 & 16: 2014 USA Women's Sevens at the Fifth Third Bank Stadium in Kennesaw, Georgia
    - Cup winner: New Zealand
    - Plate winner: United States
    - Bowl winner: Netherlands
  - February 21 & 22: 2014 São Paulo Women's Sevens at the Arena Barueri in (Brazil) Barueri
    - Cup winner: Australia
    - Plate winner: Spain
    - Bowl winner: United States
  - April 5 & 6: 2014 China Women's Sevens at the Guangzhou University City Stadium in Guangzhou
    - Cup winner: New Zealand
    - Plate winner: England
    - Bowl winner: Ireland
  - May 16 & 17: 2014 Netherlands Women's Sevens at the NRCA Stadium in Amsterdam (final)
    - Cup winner: New Zealand
    - Plate winner: United States
    - Bowl winner: Netherlands
- March 8–9: 2014 South American Games

== News ==
- March 24: The Australian Rugby Union announces the launch of the National Rugby Championship, the newest attempt to establish a nationwide domestic competition in that country. The inaugural season will feature nine teams and will begin in August 2014.
- April 10 – An agreement is reached to replace the current European club championships, the top-level Heineken Cup and second-tier European Challenge Cup, with a new structure. Details are as follows:
  - The Heineken Cup will be replaced by the new European Rugby Champions Cup, with the number of competing teams reduced from 24 to 20.
  - The European Challenge Cup will have a minor name change to European Rugby Challenge Cup. It will continue to involve 20 clubs.
  - A completely new third-tier Qualifying Competition will be introduced. It will involve top clubs from Italy's National Championship of Excellence, plus clubs from European nations outside of those involved in the Six Nations. Two teams will advance from this competition to the Challenge Cup.
  - European Rugby Cup, which ran the Heineken Cup and original Challenge Cup, will be replaced by a new body known as European Professional Club Rugby.
- 31 July – The International Rugby Board announces that it and Global Rugby Enterprises Limited, owner of the International Rugby Hall of Fame, have reached an agreement to merge the International Hall into the IRB Hall of Fame. The merger is to take effect by the end of 2014, and will see all 37 members of the International Hall not previously honoured by the IRB enter what will eventually become the World Rugby Hall of Fame (see 28 August item below for more details).
- 28 August – The IRB announces that effective 19 November, it will change its name to World Rugby.

== See also ==
- 2014 in sports
