= Kwagga Smith =

South African rugby union player (born 1993)

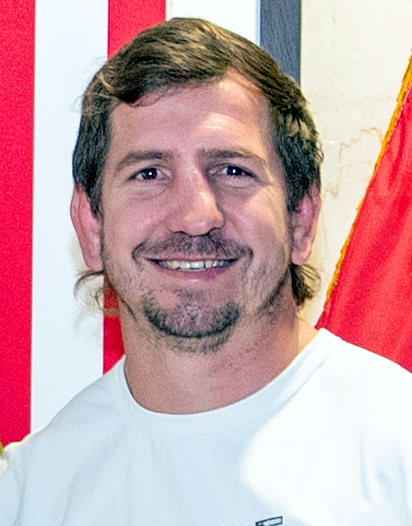
- Smith in 2026
- Full name: Albertus Stephanus Smith
- Born: 11 June 1993 (age 33) Lydenburg, Transvaal, South Africa
- Height: 1.80 m (5 ft 11 in)
- Weight: 100 kg (220 lb; 15 st 10 lb)
- School: Hoër Tegniese Skool Middelburg
- Notable relative: Tiaan Pretorius (nephew)

Rugby union career
- Position(s): Flanker, Number 8
- Current team: Bulls
Youth career
- 2010–2011: Pumas
- 2012–2014: Golden Lions
Senior career
Years	Team	Apps	(Points)
2014–2017	Golden Lions	34	(105)
2015–2019	Lions	50	(105)
2017	Golden Lions XV	1	(5)
2018–2026	Shizuoka Blue Revs	85	(210)
2026–	Bulls	0	(0)
- Correct as of 5 November 2026
International career
Years	Team	Apps	(Points)
2013	South Africa U20	3	(10)
2013–2017	South Africa Sevens	158	(310)
2018–	South Africa	63	(55)
- Correct as of 29 November 2025
Medal record
Men's rugby sevens
Representing South Africa
Olympic Games
Bronze medal – third place	2016 Rio de Janeiro	Team competition
Commonwealth Games
Gold medal – first place	2014 Glasgow	Team competition
Men's rugby union
Rugby World Cup
Gold medal – first place	2019 Japan	Squad
Gold medal – first place	2023 France	Squad

Albertus Stephanus "Kwagga" Smith (born 11 June 1993) is a South African professional rugby union player who plays for the Bulls in the United Rugby Championship and international Test rugby for the South Africa national team. His regular position is flanker or number 8.

He was a member of the South Africa Sevens team that won a bronze medal at the 2016 Summer Olympics and the South Africa teams that won the 2019 and 2023 Rugby World Cups.

== Career ==
=== Youth ===
He played school rugby for HTS Middelburg in Mpumalanga, which led to his inclusion in the Pumas U18 squads that played at the Craven Week competitions in 2010 and 2011.

After school, he moved to Johannesburg, where he joined the Golden Lions. He started in nine matches for the Golden Lions U19 side during the 2012 Under-19 Provincial Championship, scoring four tries.

He was selected in the South Africa U20 side that played at the 2013 IRB Junior World Championship in France. His only appearance in the pool stages came when he came played off the bench in the 97–0 victory over the United States. He didn't play in their matches against England and France, but he did return to the bench for their semi-final clash with Wales. He came on in the first half and scored one of South Africa's two tries in the match, but it wasn't enough to prevent them losing the match 18–17 as Wales progressed to the final. Smith was again named in their final match of the tournament, the third place play-off against New Zealand, and once again scored a try for the Baby Boks to help the team to a 41–34 victory, clinching third place in the competition.

He returned to domestic action later in 2013, making ten appearances for the Golden Lions U21 side in the 2013 Under-21 Provincial Championship, scoring four tries in the process. He also played for the same team in the 2014 Under-21 Provincial Championship.

=== Golden Lions ===
He was included in the Golden Lions first team squad for the 2014 Currie Cup Premier Division and was named on the bench for their Round Two match against the Eastern Province Kings in Johannesburg.

=== Shizuoka Blue Revs ===
In July 2018, Smith joined Japanese side Yamaha Júbilo (later renamed the Shizuoka Blue Revs) for the 2018–19 Top League season. By the concluding 2021 season, Smith had been selected in the leagues best fifteen awards twice, two times in consecutive seasons. In 2022–23, Smith, which had been announced as the clubs co-captain at the beginning of the season, was named the teams best forward.

Smith played over 80 games for the Blues Revs since 2018, scoring 42 tries. In October 2026, ahead of the start to the 2026–27 season, Smith's contract with the Blues Revs was terminated by mutual consent.

Bulls

In October 2026, Smith signed a three-year deal with the Bulls in the United Rugby Championship.

== International career ==
=== Sevens ===
At the end of 2013, Smith joined the South Africa Sevens side. He made his debut on the international IRB Sevens World Series circuit at the 2013 South Africa Sevens event, helping his side to victory in their home tournament for just the second time ever, beating New Zealand in the Cup final. He appeared in six legs of the 2013–14 IRB Sevens World Series, following up the event in South Africa with appearances in the United States, Hong Kong, Japan, Scotland and London legs of the tournament.

He was selected in the squad that played at the 2014 Commonwealth Games and helped his side to a 17–12 victory over a New Zealand team that won the previous four consecutive tournaments.

==== 2016 Summer Olympics ====
Smith was included in a 12-man squad for the 2016 Summer Olympics in Rio de Janeiro. He was named in the starting line-up for their first match in Group B of the competition against Spain, with South Africa winning the match 24–0.

=== Test rugby ===
Smith was named in the South Africa squad for the 2019 Rugby World Cup. Smith played two matches, against Namibia and Canada in the pool stage, starting both at openside flanker. South Africa went on to win the tournament, defeating England in the final.

In 2021, Smith was part of the South Africa squad for the tests against the British and Irish Lions and Georgia. In the game against Georgia, he scored his first test try, playing as 8th man. He went on to feature for the rest of 2021, including the 2021 Rugby Championship and 2021 Autumn Nations Series, predominantly at the blindside flank and also number 8.

=== Test record ===
As of 29 November 2025.

Against	P	W	D	L	T	Pts	W%
Argentina	11	10	0	1	0	0	90.91
Australia	8	4	0	4	4	20	50
British & Irish Lions	3	2	0	1	0	0	66.67
Canada	1	1	0	0	0	0	100
England	4	3	0	1	0	0	75
France	2	1	0	1	0	0	50
Georgia	2	2	0	0	1	5	100
Ireland	5	2	0	3	0	0	40
Italy	3	3	0	0	1	5	100
Japan	1	1	0	0	0	0	100
Namibia	1	1	0	0	0	0	100
New Zealand	12	7	1	4	4	20	58.33
Romania	1	1	0	0	0	0	100
Scotland	2	2	0	0	0	0	100
Tonga	1	1	0	0	1	5	100
Wales	6	5	0	1	0	0	83.33
Total	63	46	1	16	11	55	73.02

=== Test tries ===
List of international tries scored by Kwagga Smith
No.	Opponent	Location	Competition	Date	Result
1	Georgia	Loftus Versfeld Stadium, Pretoria	2021 July Tests	2 July 2021	40–9
2	Australia	Adelaide Oval, Adelaide	2022 Rugby Championship	27 August 2022	17–25
3	Australia	Adelaide Oval, Adelaide	2022 Rugby Championship	27 August 2022	17–25
4	Italy	Stadio Luigi Ferraris, Genoa	2022 Autumn Internationals	19 November 2022	63–21
5	New Zealand	Mount Smart Stadium, Auckland	2023 Rugby Championship	15 July 2023	20–35
6	New Zealand	Twickenham Stadium, London	2023 Rugby World Cup warm-up match	25 August 2023	35–7
7	Tonga	Stade Vélodrome, Marseille	2023 Rugby World Cup	1 October 2023	49–18
8	Australia	Lang Park, Brisbane	2024 Rugby Championship	10 August 2024	33–7
9	New Zealand	Ellis Park Stadium, Johannesburg	2024 Rugby Championship	31 August 2024	31–27
10	Australia	Cape Town Stadium, Cape Town	2025 Rugby Championship	23 August 2025	30–22
11	New Zealand	Wellington Regional Stadium, Wellington	2025 Rugby Championship	13 September 2025	43–10

== Honours ==
Lions

- Currie Cup: 2015

South Africa

- Rugby World Cup: 2019, 2023
- The Rugby Championship: 2019, 2024, 2025

South Africa Sevens

- Summer Olympics – Bronze: 2016
- Commonwealth Games – Gold: 2014
