= Werner Kok =

South African rugby union player

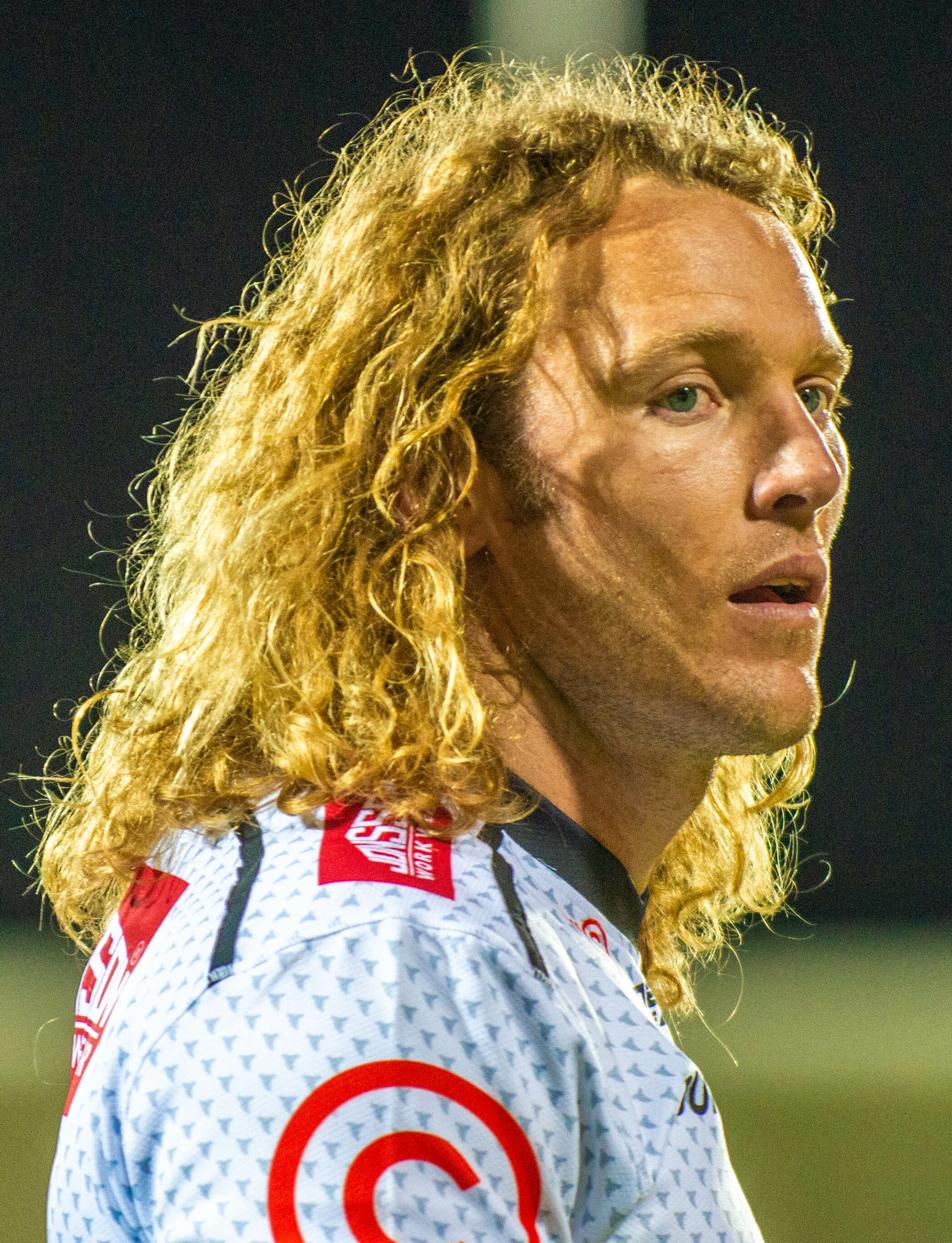
- Born: 17 January 1993 (age 33) Mbombela, South Africa
- Height: 1.79 m (5 ft 10 1/2 in)
- Weight: 96 kg (212 lb; 15 st 2 lb)
- School: Hoërskool Nelspruit, Nelspruit

Rugby union career
- Position: Centre / Winger
- Current team: Ulster
Youth career
- 2009–2011: Pumas
- 2012: Western Province
Senior career
Years	Team	Apps	(Points)
2016–2018	Western Province	15	(30)
2019	Stade Toulousain	5	(5)
2020–2024	Sharks	34	(35)
2020–2024	Sharks (Currie Cup)	15	(10)
2024-2026	Ulster	33	(75)
2026-	Newcastle Red Bulls	0	(0)
- Correct as of 15 May 2026
International career
Years	Team	Apps	(Points)
2013–2020	South Africa Sevens	280+	(420)
- Correct as of 14 November 2018
Medal record
Men's rugby sevens
Representing South Africa
Rugby World Cup Sevens
Bronze medal – third place	2018 San Francisco	Team competition
Olympic Games
Bronze medal – third place	2016 Rio de Janeiro	Team competition
Commonwealth Games
Gold medal – first place	2014 Glasgow	Team competition
World Games
Gold medal – first place	2013 Cali	Team competition

Werner Kok (born 17 January 1993) is a South African rugby union player, currently playing for Newcastle Red Bulls. His regular position is centre or winger.

Kok was a member of the South African Sevens team that won a bronze medal at the 2016 Summer Olympics.

== Rugby career ==
=== Youth ===
At high school level, Kok represented the Pumas at the Under-16 2009 Grant Khomo Week and also at the Under-18 Craven Week tournament in 2011, where he scored a try in their match against Boland.

In 2012, Kok moved to Cape Town, where he represented the Western Province U19 side during the 2012 Under-19 Provincial Championship. He made eleven appearances for them in the competition. He scored one try during the regular season – their second-last match against Free State U19 – and scored a second try for the side in the final against the Blue Bulls U19 to help them to a 22–18 victory to see them win the championship.

=== South African Sevens ===
In 2013, Kok became involved with the South African Sevens side. He made his debut for them at the 2013 London Sevens, the final event of the 2012–13 IRB Sevens World Series. He didn't play in the 2013 Rugby World Cup Sevens in June 2013, but he did represent South Africa at the 2013 World Games in Cali, Colombia, where South Africa won the event, beating Argentina in the final.

Kok established himself as a regular for South Africa during the 2013–14 IRB Sevens World Series, including their wins at the 2013 South Africa Sevens and the 2014 USA Sevens. He was also included in their squad that played at the 2014 Commonwealth Games in Glasgow, helping his side all the way to the final, where they got a 17–12 victory over a New Zealand that won the previous four tournaments.

Kok was named the World Rugby Sevens Player of the Year for 2015 following his performances in the 2014–15 IRB Sevens World Series, where he was also the leading tackler in the series.

=== 2016 Summer Olympics ===
Kok was included in a 12-man squad for the 2016 Summer Olympics in Rio de Janeiro. He was named as a substitute for their first match in Group B of the competition against Spain, with South Africa winning the match 24–0.
