= Shaun Adendorff =

South African rugby union player (born 1992)

- Born: 28 May 1992 (age 34) Durban, South Africa
- Height: 1.86 m (6 ft 1 in)
- Weight: 108 kg (17 st 0 lb; 238 lb)
- School: Glenwood High School
- University: University of Pretoria

Rugby union career
- Position: Flanker
- Current team: Northampton Saints
Youth career
- 2005–2008: Sharks
- 2011–2013: Blue Bulls
Amateur team(s)
Years	Team	Apps	(Points)
2013	UP Tuks	8	(25)
Senior career
Years	Team	Apps	(Points)
2013	Blue Bulls	3	(0)
2016	Boland Cavaliers	17	(25)
2017–2018	Bulls	4	(0)
2017–2018	Blue Bulls XV	8	(25)
2017	Blue Bulls	6	(0)
2018–2020	Aurillac	0	(0)
2020–present	Northampton Saints		
- Correct as of 15 July 2018
International career
Years	Team	Apps	(Points)
2012	South Africa Under-20	3	(10)
2014	South Africa Sevens	2	
- Correct as of 21 January 2016

Shaun Adendorff (born 28 May 1992) is a South African professional rugby union player for Northampton Saints in Premiership Rugby. His regular position is flanker.

== Career ==
=== KwaZulu-Natal ===
Adendorff was selected to represent his local KwaZulu-Natal provincial union at both the 2005 Under-13 Craven Week for primary schools tournament and at the 2008 Under-16 Grant Khomo Week tournament. He didn't represent them at Craven Week level though and opted to move to Pretoria to join the Blue Bulls academy after high school.

=== Blue Bulls / South Africa Under-20 / UP Tuks ===
Adendorff joined the Blue Bulls academy for the 2011 season and was selected to play for the Blue Bulls U19 side in the 2011 Under-19 Provincial Championship. He started nine of their twelve matches during the regular season of the competition, scored tries in their matches against SWD U19, Golden Lions U19 and Leopards U19 to help the Blue Bulls finish top of the log to qualify for the title play-offs. He started their 48–13 victory over Free State U19 in the semi-final, as well as the final, where the team suffered a 19–20 defeat to the Golden Lions U19s in Johannesburg.

In 2012, he was selected in the South Africa Under-20 squad for the 2012 IRB Junior World Championship, which was held in South Africa. Adendorff started their first match in the competition, but the hosts got off to a bad start, losing 19–23 to Ireland. He wasn't included in the matchday squad as South Africa recovered to beat Italy 52–3 in their second match, but he returned to the starting line-up as they beat England 28–15 to finish top of the log. Adendorff was a key figure in South Africa's vital victory, scoring two tries in the match. He started his third match of the tournament as South Africa easily dispatched Argentina in the semi-final, winning 35–3, and was named on the bench for the final against New Zealand. He didn't get any game time in the match, as South Africa won 22–16 in the final, to win the competition for the first time and ending New Zealand's four-year reign as champions.

Adendorff returned to domestic action for the Blue Bulls U21 side in the 2012 Under-21 Provincial Championship. Despite still being in the Under-20 age group, he quickly established himself in the team. He missed their first match of the season, played off the bench in their second match against the Golden Lions U21 and was selected in the starting line-up for all their remaining twelve matches in the competition. He scored tries in their matches against Western Province U21 and Sharks U21, as the side emulated for the Under-19 team the previous season by winning ten of their twelve matches to finish the regular season at the top of the log. Adendorff scored his third try of the campaign in a 50–24 victory over the Free State U21s in the semi-finals, but again suffered defeat in a final, with his side losing 18–22 to Western Province U21 to finish as the competition's runner-up.

Adendorff started the 2013 season playing Varsity Cup rugby for UP Tuks. He scored five tries in eight starts in the competition, which included a hat-trick in their 52–0 victory over Wits. Tries in their victories over the UCT Ikey Tigers and UJ helped UP Tuks qualify for the semi-finals. UP Tuks beat UJ 61–24 in the semi-final and three-time champions Maties 44–5 in the final to win the competition for the second consecutive season.

Shortly after the Varsity Cup, Adendorff joined the Blue Bulls squad that competed in the 2013 Vodacom Cup. He made his first class debut in a 110–0 victory over the Limpopo Blue Bulls in Lephalale and also appeared in matches against the Griffons and the Eastern Province Kings.

Adendorff returned to the Blue Bulls U21 in the second half of the season, making ten appearances in the 2013 Under-21 Provincial Championship. He scored tries their matches against Free State U21 and the Sharks U21s as the Blue Bulls finished in second spot on the log. Following a victory over the Sharks in the semi-final, Adendorff ended on the losing side of a Provincial Championship final for the third consecutive season as the Western Province U21s beat them 30–23 in Cape Town.

=== South Africa Sevens ===
Adendorff was then contracted by the South African Rugby Union for the South Africa Sevens squad. He represented them at the final two events of the 2013–14 IRB Sevens World Series, the 2014 Scotland Sevens and 2014 London Sevens. However, this proved to be his only involvement with the main South Africa Sevens squad, although he did represent their Academy squad on occasion.

Despite interest from Nelspruit-based side the Pumas to contract him for the 2015 season, he remained in the Sevens programme until the end of 2015.

=== Boland Cavaliers ===
Adendorff returned to fifteen-man rugby in 2016 by moving to Wellington-based outfit Boland Cavaliers for the 2016 season.

=== Aurillac ===
Adendorff moved to French Pro D2 side Aurillac prior to the 2018–19 season.

=== Northampton Saints ===
Abendorff signed for Premiership Rugby side Northampton Saints ahead of the 2020–21 season.
