= Samisoni Viriviri =

Fiji international rugby union player

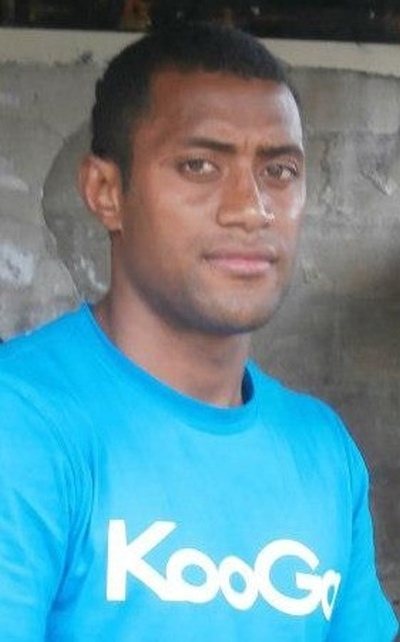
- Born: Samisoni Viriviri Nasagavesi; 25 April 1988 (age 38)
- Height: 1.86 m (6 ft 1 in)
- Weight: 88 kg (13 st 12 lb; 194 lb)
- School: Ratu Navula College
- Notable relative: Samisoni Viriviri Sr. (grandfather) Timoci Nagusa (cousin)

Rugby union career
- Position: Wing/Fullback
Senior career
Years	Team	Apps	(Points)
2012–2014	Nadroga	10	(20)
2014–2015	Montpellier	6	(0)
2015–2016	Montauban	10	(20)
2019	South China Tigers	4	(5)
2019−2020	Fijian Drua	3	(5)
International career
Years	Team	Apps	(Points)
2014-	Fiji	2	(0)
National sevens team
Years	Team		Comps
2012–	Fiji		22(485)97t
Medal record
Men's rugby sevens
Representing Fiji
Olympic Games
Gold medal – first place	2016 Rio de Janeiro	Team competition

Samisoni Viriviri Nasagavesi MOF (born 25 April 1988) is a Fiji rugby union player. He played for the Fiji sevens team, and in 2014 won the World Rugby Sevens Player of the Year award after leading the 2013-14 World Rugby Sevens Series in tries scored.

He has signed with the French Top 14 club Montpellier.

== Early career ==
Viriviri started his career playing in the local 7's competition. He chased a dream borne out of the stories of his grandfather and namesake who was part of the legendary 1977 Fiji XV that beat the British and Irish Lions in Suva. At 19, he broke into the club level for Dratabu in the Nadi Rugby Union club games and later played for Lomaiviti and Suva in 2010 before joining Nadroga. He played for the Police 7's side and he caught the eye of Fiji sevens assistant coach, Etuate Waqa and was selected as the backup winger to Waisea Nayacalevu in the Fiji 7's side.

== 2012–present ==
He made his debut at the 2012 Gold Coast Sevens but did not make the cut for the Dubai and South Africa legs. He made a comeback in the 2013 Wellington Sevens and followed it up with an impressive effort in the 2013 USA Sevens. His top performance and 8 tries at Hong Kong gave him the Best and Fairest Player Award. He ended the 2012–13 IRB Sevens World Series with 29 tries.

In January 2014, he signed with Top 14 club, Montpellier.

He started the 2013–14 IRB Sevens World Series like he ended the last, he notched up 7 tries in the 2013 Dubai Sevens and he carried his performance to the 2013 South Africa Sevens scoring 6 tries. He became the top try scorer in Japan scoring 9 tries. He leads the season with 48 tries, 17 clear of nearest rival, NZ's, Tim Mikkelson.

He was shortlisted as the 2014 IRB Sevens Player of the Year. He finished the season as the Top try-scorer with 52 tries. At the end of the 2014 London Sevens, Viriviri was awarded the 2014 IRB Sevens Player of the Year, the first time a Fijian (playing for Fiji) has ever won that award.

He was also named in the IRB 7s dream team of the season alongside NZ's DJ Forbes, Scott Curry, Australia's Cameron Clarke, Canadian duo John Moonlight and Phil Mack as well as South Africa's Justin Geduld.

He made his debut for Montpellier in the 2014–15 European Rugby Champions Cup pool stage on the left wing, he scored a try but was denied by the referee due to an incident earlier. But he did not score any try in six appearances in Top 14 and European Champions Cup.

In 2015, he was sold off to ProD2 club, Montauban. He joined the Fiji 7's side in March 2016 and helped them win the 2015–16 World Rugby Sevens Series. He made the final 28-man squad for the Fiji 15's team for the 2016 World Rugby Pacific Nations Cup.
