= Benito Masilevu =

Fijian rugby union player

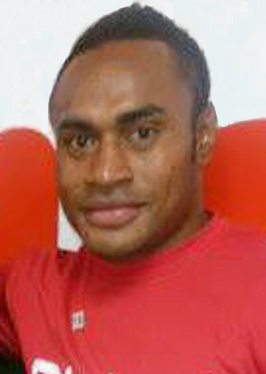
- Born: Benito Eremasilevu; 7 October 1989 (age 37) Savusavu
- Height: 1.70 m (5 ft 7 in)
- Weight: 83 kg (13 st 1 lb; 183 lb)
- School: Marist Brothers High School

Rugby union career
- Position: Wing
Senior career
Years	Team	Apps	(Points)
2014-18	Brive	72	(85)
2018-	Agen	4	(5)
- Correct as of 1 June 2015
International career
Years	Team	Apps	(Points)
2015-	Fiji	10	(0)
- Correct as of 10 June 2018
National sevens team
Years	Team		Comps
2013-14	Fiji 7s		16

Benito Eremasilevu (born October 7, 1989) in Savusavu, Cakaudrove is a Fijian rugby union footballer. He plays wing for Fiji and French Top 14 side, Brive.

== Career ==
Masilevu was born in Savusavu, he attended St Bedes Primary school. He later moved to Suva and attended Marist Brothers High School. After finishing High school, he joined the Fiji National University and completed his diploma in teaching.

He started playing 7's rugby and soon he was spotted by Fiji sevens assistant coach, Etuate Waqa, who included him in his squad. He made his debut in the 2013 Gold Coast Sevens where he scored 6 tries. He finished the 2013–14 IRB Sevens World Series with 27 tries and 2nd highest try scorer overall behind another Fijian winger, Samisoni Viriviri.

His strong performance on the sevens circuit caught the eye of CA Brive head coach, Nicolas Godignon who signed him up. He joined other Fijian players in the squad including, Sisaro Koyamaibole, Dominiko Waqaniburotu and Malakai Radikedike.

In September 2014, he made news headlines when he beat Toulouse winger, Gaël Fickou for dead with a giant sidestep to score a match winning try. A few days later, Masilevu extended his 1-year contract until 2018.

On 11 July 2015, he made his debut for the Flying Fijians starting on the wing in a 26–27 loss to the Māori All Blacks in Suva.

In 2017 he was named to the Flying Fijians squad for tests against Australia and for the 2017 Pacific nations Cup.

In 2022 he started a farming business in preparation for his retirement from rugby.
