= World Rugby Men's Sevens Dream Team of the Year =

Men's 7s Dream Team of the Year
- Date: 2024; 2 years ago
- Presented by: World Rugby
- First award: 2024

World Rugby Men's Sevens Dream Team of the Year was awarded for the first time at the World Rugby Awards that took place in Monaco on 24 November 2024.

== Dream Teams ==
Year	Team	Refs
2024	1. Selvyn Davids South Africa; 2. Antoine Dupont France; 3. Aaron Grandidier-Nkanang France; 4. Terry Kennedy Ireland; 5. Nathan Lawson Australia; 6. Ponepati Loganimasi Fiji; 7. Matías Osadczuk Argentina	
2025	1. Harry Glover Great Britain; 2. Luciano González Argentina; 3. Manu Moreno Spain; 4. Marcos Moneta Argentina; 5. Joji Nasova Fiji; 6. Pol Pla Spain; 7. Paulin Riva France	
