= 2013 Gold Coast Sevens =

- IRB Sevens XV
- Host nation: Australia
- Date: 12–13 October 2013

Cup
- Champion: New Zealand
- Runner-up: Australia
- Third: England

Plate
- Winner: Fiji
- Runner-up: Kenya

Bowl
- Winner: France
- Runner-up: Canada

Shield
- Winner: United States
- Runner-up: Portugal

Tournament details
- Matches played: 45
- Most points: (New Zealand) Tomasi Cama (47)
- Most tries: (New Zealand) Tim Mikkelson (7)

The 2013 Gold Coast Sevens was the first tournament of the 2013-2014 Sevens World Series. It was held over the weekend of 12–13 October 2013 at Robina Stadium (known for sponsorship reasons as Skilled Park) in Queensland, Australia. It was the eleventh edition of the Australian Sevens tournament and the first stop of the 2013–14 IRB Sevens World Series.

== Format ==
The teams were drawn into four pools of four teams each. Each team played everyone in their pool one time. The top two teams from each pool advanced to the Cup/Plate brackets. The bottom two teams from each group went to the Bowl/Shield brackets.

== Teams ==
The participating teams and schedule were announced on 11 September 2013. They are the same teams as the previous year.

- Argentina
- Australia
- Canada
- England
- Fiji
- France
- Kenya
- New Zealand
- Portugal
- Samoa
- Scotland
- South Africa
- Spain
- Tonga
- United States
- Wales

== Pool Stage ==
Key to colours in group tables
Teams that advanced to the Cup Quarterfinal

=== Pool A ===
Team	Pld	W	D	L	PF	PA	PD	Pts
New Zealand	3	3	0	0	95	0	+95	9
Kenya	3	2	0	1	69	36	+33	7
United States	3	1	0	2	19	76	-57	5
Tonga	3	0	0	3	7	78	-71	3

12 October 2013
10:30

New Zealand	38–0	United States
	Report

Skilled Park, Gold Coast

12 October 2013
10:52

Kenya	38–0	Tonga
	Report

Skilled Park, Gold Coast

12 October 2013
13:36

New Zealand	26–0	Tonga
	Report

Skilled Park, Gold Coast

12 October 2013
13:58

Kenya	31–5	United States
	Report

Skilled Park, Gold Coast

12 October 2013
17:02

United States	14–7	Tonga
	Report

Skilled Park, Gold Coast

12 October 2013
18:40

New Zealand	31–0	Kenya
	Report

Skilled Park, Gold Coast

=== Pool B ===
Team	Pld	W	D	L	PF	PA	PD	Pts
South Africa	3	3	0	0	89	26	+63	9
England	3	2	0	1	94	41	+53	7
France	3	1	0	2	45	74	-29	5
Spain	3	0	0	3	33	120	-87	3

12 October 2012
11:14

South Africa	29–5	France
	Report

Skilled Park, Gold Coast

12 October 2012
11:36

England	54–7	Spain
	Report

Skilled Park, Gold Coast

12 October 2012
14:20

South Africa	38–7	Spain
	Report

Skilled Park, Gold Coast

12 October 2012
14:42

England	26–12	France
	Report

Skilled Park, Gold Coast

12 October 2012
17:24

France	28–19	Spain
	Report

Skilled Park, Gold Coast

12 October 2012
19:02

South Africa	22–14	England
	Report

Skilled Park, Gold Coast

=== Pool C ===
Team	Pld	W	D	L	PF	PA	PD	Pts
Fiji	3	2	0	1	77	32	+45	7
Wales	3	2	0	1	69	52	+17	7
Canada	3	2	0	1	53	51	+2	7
Portugal	3	0	0	3	31	95	-64	3

12 October 2013
11:58

Fiji	20–10	Canada
	Report

Skilled Park, Gold Coast

12 October 2013
12:20

Wales	33–14	Portugal
	Report

Skilled Park, Gold Coast

12 October 2013
15:14

Fiji	38–0	Portugal
	Report

Skilled Park, Gold Coast

12 October 2013
15:36

Wales	14–19	Canada
	Report

Skilled Park, Gold Coast

12 October 2013
17:46

Canada	24–17	Portugal
	Report

Skilled Park, Gold Coast

12 October 2013
19:24

Fiji	19–22	Wales
	Report

Skilled Park, Gold Coast

=== Pool D ===
Team	Pld	W	D	L	PF	PA	PD	Pts
Australia	3	2	1	0	55	28	+27	8
Samoa	3	2	0	1	45	31	+14	7
Argentina	3	1	0	2	35	67	-32	5
Scotland	3	0	1	2	52	61	-9	4

12 October 2013
12:42

Samoa	26–7	Argentina
	Report

Skilled Park, Gold Coast

12 October 2013
13:04

Australia	21–21	Scotland
	Report

Skilled Park, Gold Coast

12 October 2013
15:58

Samoa	19–12	Scotland
	Report

Skilled Park, Gold Coast

12 October 2013
16:20

Australia	22–7	Argentina
	Report

Skilled Park, Gold Coast

12 October 2013
18:08

Argentina	21–19	Scotland
	Report

Skilled Park, Gold Coast

12 October 2013
19:46

Samoa	0–12	Australia
	Report

Skilled Park, Gold Coast

== Knockout stage ==
=== Shield ===
Quarter-finals
13 October 2013 – 10:30 – Skilled Park, Gold Coast
United States	10
Scotland	19
13 October 2013 – 10:52 – Skilled Park, Gold Coast
Canada	29
Spain	5
13 October 2013 – 11:14 – Skilled Park, Gold Coast
Argentina	17
Tonga	12
13 October 2013 – 11:36 – Skilled Park, Gold Coast
France	26
Portugal	14

Semi-finals
13 October 2013 – 13:36 – Skilled Park, Gold Coast
United States	26
Spain	7
13 October 2013 – 13:58 – Skilled Park, Gold Coast
Tonga	7
Portugal	40

Final
13 October 2013 – 17:02 – Skilled Park, Gold Coast
United States	22
Portugal	0

=== Bowl ===
Quarter-finals
13 October 2013 – 10:30 – Skilled Park, Gold Coast
United States	10
Scotland	19
13 October 2013 – 10:52 – Skilled Park, Gold Coast
Canada	29
Spain	5
13 October 2013 – 11:14 – Skilled Park, Gold Coast
Argentina	17
Tonga	12
13 October 2013 – 11:36 – Skilled Park, Gold Coast
France	26
Portugal	14

Semi-finals
13 October 2013 – 14:20 – Skilled Park, Gold Coast
Scotland	14
Canada	19
13 October 2013 – 14:42 – Skilled Park, Gold Coast
Argentina	12
France	17

Final
13 October 2013 – 17:32 – Skilled Park, Gold Coast
Canada	14
France	19

=== Plate ===
Quarter-finals
13 October 2013 – 11:58 – Skilled Park, Gold Coast
New Zealand	40
Samoa	0
13 October 2013 – 12:20 – Skilled Park, Gold Coast
Fiji	12
England	26
13 October 2013 – 12:42 – Skilled Park, Gold Coast
Australia	24
Kenya	12
13 October 2013 – 13:04 – Skilled Park, Gold Coast
South Africa	28
Wales	21

Semi-finals
13 October 2013 – 15:14 – Skilled Park, Gold Coast
Samoa	26
Fiji	31
13 October 2013 – 15:36 – Skilled Park, Gold Coast
Kenya	12
Wales	7

Final
13 October 2013 – 18:02 – Skilled Park, Gold Coast
Fiji	36
Kenya	0

=== Cup ===
Quarter-finals
13 October 2013 – 11:58 – Skilled Park, Gold Coast
New Zealand	40
Samoa	0
13 October 2013 – 12:20 – Skilled Park, Gold Coast
Fiji	12
England	26
13 October 2013 – 12:42 – Skilled Park, Gold Coast
Australia	24
Kenya	12
13 October 2013 – 13:04 – Skilled Park, Gold Coast
South Africa	28
Wales	21

Semi-finals
13 October 2013 – 15:58 – Skilled Park, Gold Coast
New Zealand	14
England	5
13 October 2013 – 16:20 – Skilled Park, Gold Coast
Australia	24
South Africa	19

Final
13 October 2013 – 19:04 – Skilled Park, Gold Coast
New Zealand	40
Australia	19
Third place
13 October 2013 – 18:32 – Skilled Park, Gold Coast
England	47
South Africa	0

== Player statistics ==
=== Points scored ===
Points scored
Pos.	Player	Points
1	Tomasi Cama (NZL)	46
2	Ilai Tinai (FIJ)	43
3	Justin Geduld (RSA)	42
4	Tom Mitchell (ENG)	37
5	Tim Mikkelson (NZL)	35
6	Paul Albaladejo (FRA)	30
6	Joe Webber (NZL)	30
6	Benito Masilevu (FIJ)	30
6	Carl Murray (POR)	30
10	Folau Niua (USA)	27

=== Tries scored ===
Tries scored
Pos.	Player	Tries
1	Tim Mikkelson (NZL)	7
2	Benito Masilevu (FIJ)	6
2	Carl Murray (POR)	6
2	Joe Webber (NZL)	6
5	Dan Bibby (ENG)	5
5	Chris Knight (WAL)	5
5	John Moonlight (CAN)	5
5	Ilai Tinai (FIJ)	5

== Dream Team ==
The 2013 Gold Coast Sevens 'Dream Team' as voted for by the fans.

- (Australia) Ed Jenkins
- (Kenya) Oscar Ouma
- (New Zealand) Scott Curry
- (South Africa) Justin Geduld
- (New Zealand) Tim Mikkelson
- (New Zealand) Joel Webber
- (Fiji) Ilai Tinai
