= Cristián Viel =

Argentine rugby union player (born 1967)

- Born: November 4, 1967 (age 59) Buenos Aires
- Height: 6 ft 3 in (1.91 m)
- Weight: 220 lb (100 kg; 15 st 10 lb)

Rugby union career
- Position: Flanker
International career
Years	Team	Apps	(Points)
1993-1997	Argentina	26	(15)
National sevens team
Years	Team		Comps
1993	Argentina 7s		1993 RWC7s

Cristián Enrique Viel Temperley (born 4 November 1967) is a former Argentine rugby union player. He played as a flanker.

Viel played for Club Newman in the Nacional de Clubes of Argentina.

He had 26 caps for Argentina, from 1993 to 1997, scoring 3 tries, 15 points on aggregate. He was called for the 1995 Rugby World Cup, playing in three games but without scoring.
