= 2013 Dubai Sevens =

World Rugby Sevens Series tournament

- IRB Sevens XV
- Host nation: United Arab Emirates
- Date: 29–30 November 2013

Cup
- Champion: Fiji
- Runner-up: South Africa
- Third: New Zealand

Plate
- Winner: Argentina
- Runner-up: Wales

Bowl
- Winner: Australia
- Runner-up: Portugal

Shield
- Winner: France
- Runner-up: Spain

Tournament details
- Matches played: 45
- Tries scored: 260 (average 5.78 per match)
- Most points: (Scotland) Colin Gregor (40)
- Most tries: (Fiji) Samisoni Viriviri (7)

The 2013 Dubai Sevens was the second tournament within the 2013-2014 Sevens World Series. It was held over the weekend of 29–30 November 2013 at The Sevens Stadium in Dubai, United Arab Emirates.

== Format ==
The teams were drawn into four pools of four teams each. Each team played the other three teams in their pool once. The top two teams from each pool advanced to the Cup/Plate brackets. The bottom two teams from each group went to the Bowl/Shield brackets.

== Teams ==
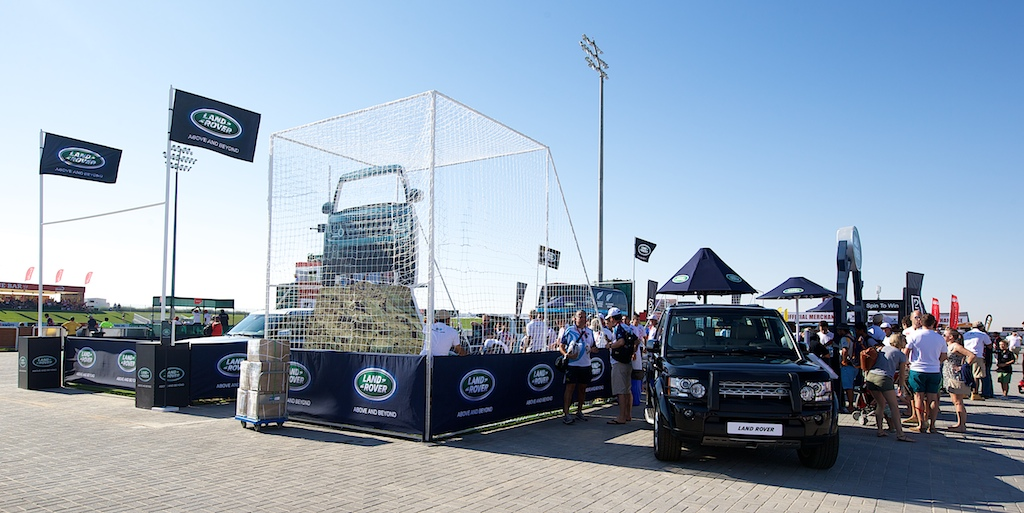
Land Rover MENA once again supported the 2013 Emirates Dubai Rugby Sevens.

The participating teams and schedule were announced on 13 October 2013.

- Argentina
- Australia
- Canada
- England
- Fiji
- France
- Kenya
- New Zealand
- Portugal
- Samoa
- Scotland
- South Africa
- Russia
- Spain
- United States
- Wales

== Pool Stage ==
Key to colours in group tables
Teams that advance to the Cup Quarterfinal

=== Pool A ===
Team	Pld	W	D	L	PF	PA	PD	Pts
New Zealand	3	3	0	0	102	5	+97	9
Kenya	3	2	0	1	24	52	-28	7
Portugal	3	1	0	2	26	60	-34	5
France	3	0	0	3	22	57	-35	3

29 November 2013
09:24

New Zealand	24–5	France
	Report

The Sevens, Dubai

29 November 2013
09:46

Kenya	10–7	Portugal
	Report

The Sevens, Dubai

29 November 2013
13:54

New Zealand	38–0	Portugal
	Report

The Sevens, Dubai

29 November 2013
14:16

Kenya	14–5	France
	Report

The Sevens, Dubai

29 November 2013
17:18

France	12–19	Portugal
	Report

The Sevens, Dubai

29 November 2013
19:16

New Zealand	40–0	Kenya
	Report

The Sevens, Dubai

=== Pool B ===
Team	Pld	W	D	L	PF	PA	PD	Pts
Wales	3	3	0	0	88	33	+55	9
Scotland	3	2	0	1	61	62	-1	7
Australia	3	1	0	2	76	40	+36	5
Spain	3	0	0	3	14	104	-90	3

29 November 2013
10:10

Australia	17–21	Scotland
	Report

The Sevens, Dubai

29 November 2013
10:32

Wales	38–0	Spain
	Report

The Sevens, Dubai

29 November 2013
14:40

Australia	45–0	Spain
	Report

The Sevens, Dubai

29 November 2013
15:02

Wales	31–19	Scotland
	Report

The Sevens, Dubai

29 November 2013
17:40

Scotland	21–14	Spain
	Report

The Sevens, Dubai

29 November 2013
19:40

Australia	14–19	Wales
	Report

The Sevens, Dubai

=== Pool C ===
Team	Pld	W	D	L	PF	PA	PD	Pts
Fiji	3	3	0	0	88	45	+43	9
England	3	2	0	1	96	38	+58	7
Canada	3	1	0	2	67	80	-13	5
United States	3	0	0	3	17	105	-88	3

29 November 2013
11:16

Fiji	36–5	United States
	Report

The Sevens, Dubai

29 November 2013
10:54

England	47–7	Canada
	Report

The Sevens, Dubai

29 November 2013
15:24

England	28–5	United States
	Report

The Sevens, Dubai

29 November 2013
15:46

Fiji	26–19	Canada
	Report

The Sevens, Dubai

29 November 2013
18:02

Canada	41–7	United States
	Report

The Sevens, Dubai

29 November 2013
20:02

England	21-26	Fiji
	Report

The Sevens, Dubai

=== Pool D ===
Team	Pld	W	D	L	PF	PA	PD	Pts
South Africa	3	3	0	0	77	17	+60	9
Argentina	3	2	0	1	59	34	+25	7
Samoa	3	1	0	2	50	57	-7	5
Russia	3	0	0	3	22	100	-78	3

29 November 2013
08:40

South Africa	17–7	Argentina
	Report

The Sevens, Dubai

29 November 2013
09:02

Samoa	33–12	Russia
	Report

The Sevens, Dubai

29 November 2013
13:10

South Africa	34–5	Russia
	Report

The Sevens, Dubai

29 November 2013
13:32

Samoa	12–19	Argentina
	Report

The Sevens, Dubai

29 November 2013
16:54

Argentina	33–5	Russia
	Report

The Sevens, Dubai

29 November 2013
18:54

South Africa	26–5	Samoa
	Report

The Sevens, Dubai

== Knockout stage ==
=== Shield ===
Quarter-finals
30 November 2013 - 09:20 - The Sevens, Dubai
Portugal	24
Russia	7
30 November 2013 - 9:42 - The Sevens, Dubai
Canada	22
Spain	12
30 November 2013 - 10:04 - The Sevens, Dubai
Samoa	21
France	10
30 November 2013 - 10:26 - The Sevens, Dubai
Australia	47
United States	7

Semi-finals
30 November 2013 - 12:21 - The Sevens, Dubai
Russia	5
Spain	17
30 November 2013 - 12:43 - The Sevens, Dubai
France	19
United States	14

Final
30 November 2013 - 18:16 - The Sevens, Dubai
Spain	17
France	28

=== Bowl ===
Quarter-finals
30 November 2013 - 09:20 - The Sevens, Dubai
Portugal	24
Russia	7
30 November 2013 - 9:42 - The Sevens, Dubai
Canada	22
Spain	12
30 November 2013 - 10:04 - The Sevens, Dubai
Samoa	21
France	10
30 November 2013 - 10:26 - The Sevens, Dubai
Australia	47
United States	7

Semi-finals
30 November 2013 - 13:05 - The Sevens, Dubai
Portugal	33
Canada	24
30 November 2013 - 13:32 - The Sevens, Dubai
Samoa	14
Australia	19

Final
30 November 2013 - 18:46 - The Sevens, Dubai
Portugal	12
Australia	17

=== Plate ===
Quarter-finals
30 November 2013 - 10:51 - The Sevens, Dubai
New Zealand	26
Argentina	19
30 November 2013 - 11:13 - The Sevens, Dubai
Fiji	26
Scotland	14
30 November 2013 - 11:35 - The Sevens, Dubai
South Africa	21
Kenya	12
30 November 2013 - 11:57 - The Sevens, Dubai
Wales	12
England	33

Semi-finals
30 November 2013 - 13:54 - The Sevens, Dubai
Argentina	12
Scotland	5
30 November 2013 - 14:16 - The Sevens, Dubai
Kenya	19
Wales	24

Final
30 November 2013 - 19:16 - The Sevens, Dubai
Argentina	21
Wales	5

=== Cup ===
Quarter-finals
30 November 2013 - 10:51 - The Sevens, Dubai
New Zealand	26
Argentina	19
30 November 2013 - 11:13 - The Sevens, Dubai
Fiji	26
Scotland	14
30 November 2013 - 11:35 - The Sevens, Dubai
South Africa	21
Kenya	12
30 November 2013 - 11:57 - The Sevens, Dubai
Wales	12
England	33

Semi-finals
30 November 2013 - 17:29 - The Sevens, Dubai
New Zealand	0
Fiji	44
30 November 2013 - 17:51 - The Sevens, Dubai
South Africa	26
England	12

Final
30 November 2013 - 20:21 - The Sevens, Dubai
Fiji	29
South Africa	17
Third place
30 November 2013 - 19:49 - The Sevens, Dubai
New Zealand	17
England	14
