= Santiago Gómez Cora =

Argentina international rugby union player

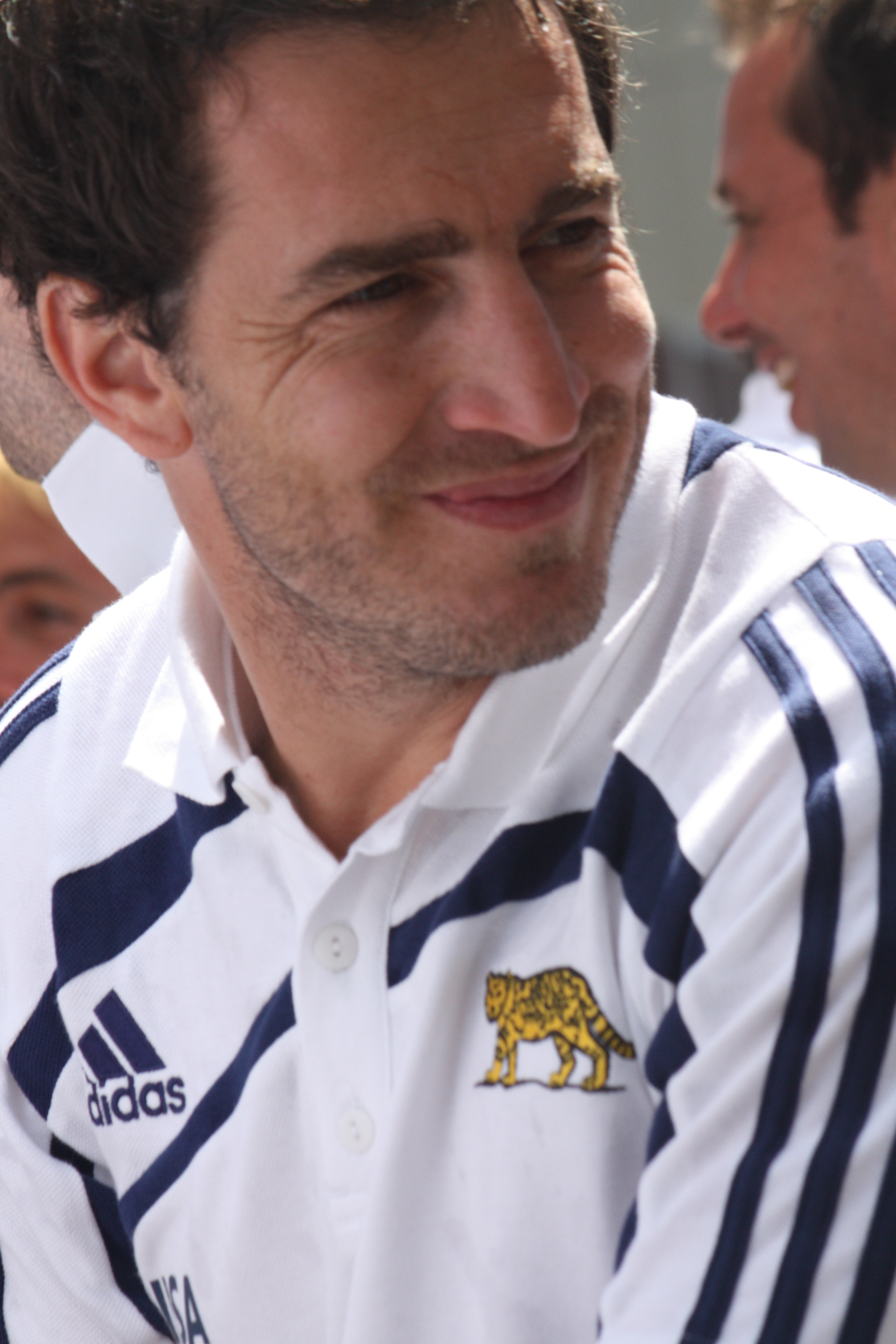
- Santiago Gómez Cora at the 2008 USA Sevens
- Born: July 25, 1978 (age 48)

Rugby union career
- Position: Fullback
International career
Years	Team	Apps	(Points)
- Argentina
National sevens team
Years	Team		Comps
2000-2010	Argentina 7s		
Coaching career
- Years: Team
- 2013-present: Argentina 7s
- 2013: Argentina Women's sevens

Santiago Gómez Cora (born July 25, 1978) is a former rugby sevens player for Argentina. He held the career record for number of tries scored on the IRB Sevens World Series circuit with 230 until May 21, 2016 when Kenyan Collins Injera took the spot. He also ranks among the top five players in career points and in appearances.

Gómez Cora also played full-back for the Pumas in fifteens. In March 2008 it was confirmed he would move to Welsh club Ospreys.

== Coaching ==
In September 2013, Gómez Cora became head coach of the Argentina national rugby sevens team. Gómez Cora has previously coached the Argentina women's rugby sevens team. In addition to his duties with Argentina's national teams, he works with Serevi Rugby, a training and development program founded by Fiji legend Waisale Serevi; he is based in Buenos Aires and operates the organization's Latin American efforts.
