= Samisoni Viriviri (rugby union coach) =

Fijian rugby union footballer and coach (1953–2021)

- Born: Nadi, Fiji
- Height: 6 ft 1 in (1.85 m)
- Notable relative: Samisoni Viriviri (grandson)

Rugby union career
- Position(s): Scrum-half, Fly-half
Senior career
Years	Team	Apps	(Points)
-	Nadi		
International career
Years	Team	Apps	(Points)
1976-1982	Fiji	24	(12)
Coaching career
- Years: Team
- 1989-1991: Fiji

Samisoni Viriviri (1953 - 28 April 2021, Sacramento, USA) was a Fijian rugby union footballer and coach. He played as a scrum-half. He is grandfather of his namesake; Samisoni Viriviri, who plays as wing for Fiji.

== Playing career ==
His first cap for Fiji was during a match against Australia, at Brisbane, on 9 June 1976. His last cap was during a match against England XV, at Twickenham, on 16 October 1982. In his career he played 24 matches and scored 12 points, 1 try, 1 penalty, 1 drop goal and 1 conversion. He was also part of the legendary 1977 Fiji XV that beat the British and Irish Lions in Suva.

== Coaching career ==
Between 1989 and 1991, Viriviri coached the Fiji national rugby union team, which he coached during the 1991 Rugby World Cup.
