= 2014 Wellington Sevens =

- IRB Sevens XV
- Host nation: New Zealand
- Date: 7–8 February 2014

Cup
- Champion: New Zealand
- Runner-up: South Africa
- Third: Fiji

Plate
- Winner: Australia
- Runner-up: Canada

Bowl
- Winner: Kenya
- Runner-up: Scotland

Shield
- Winner: United States
- Runner-up: Spain

Tournament details
- Matches played: 45
- Tries scored: 240 (average 5.33 per match)
- Most points: (New Zealand) Sherwin Stowers (40)
- Most tries: (New Zealand) Sherwin Stowers (8)

The 2014 Wellington Sevens was the 15th edition of the tournament as part of the 2013–14 IRB Sevens World Series. It was hosted in Wellington, New Zealand, at the Westpac Stadium.

== Format ==
The teams were divided into pools of four teams, who played a round-robin within the pool. Points were awarded in each pool on a different schedule from most rugby tournaments—3 for a win, 2 for a draw, 1 for a loss. The top two teams in each pool advanced to the Cup competition. The four quarterfinal losers dropped into the bracket for the Plate. The Bowl was contested by the third- and fourth-place finishers in each pool, with the losers in the Bowl quarterfinals dropping into the bracket for the Shield.

== Teams ==
The participating teams were:

- Argentina
- Australia
- Canada
- England
- Fiji
- France
- Kenya
- New Zealand
- Portugal
- Samoa
- Scotland
- South Africa
- Spain
- Tonga
- United States
- Wales

== Pool stage ==
Key to colours in group tables
Teams that advanced to the Cup Quarterfinal

=== Pool A ===
Teams	Pld	W	D	L	PF	PA	+/−	Pts
England	3	3	0	0	76	19	+57	9
South Africa	3	2	0	1	58	34	+24	7
Wales	3	1	0	2	62	66	−4	5
Portugal	3	0	0	3	31	108	−77	3

7 February 2014
14:24

South Africa	26–10	Wales
	Report

Westpac Stadium, Wellington

7 February 2014
14:45

England	36–7	Portugal
	Report

Westpac Stadium, Wellington

7 February 2014
17:12

South Africa	27–5	Portugal
	Report

Westpac Stadium, Wellington

7 February 2014
17:33

England	21–7	Wales
	Report

Westpac Stadium, Wellington

7 February 2014
19:38

Wales	45–19	Portugal
	Report

Westpac Stadium, Wellington

7 February 2014
21:34

South Africa	5–19	England
	Report

Westpac Stadium, Wellington

=== Pool B ===
Teams	Pld	W	D	L	PF	PA	+/−	Pts
Fiji	3	3	0	0	83	26	+57	9
New Zealand	3	2	0	1	109	12	+97	7
France	3	1	0	2	26	88	–62	5
Spain	3	0	0	3	29	121	−92	3

7 February 2014
15:06

New Zealand	7–12	Fiji
	Report

Westpac Stadium, Wellington

7 February 2014
15:27

France	21–15	Spain
	Report

Westpac Stadium, Wellington

7 February 2014
17:54

New Zealand	55–0	Spain
	Report

Westpac Stadium, Wellington

7 February 2014
18:35

France	5–26	Fiji
	Report

Westpac Stadium, Wellington

7 February 2014
20:28

Fiji	45–14	Spain
	Report

Westpac Stadium, Wellington

7 February 2014
21:56

New Zealand	47–0	France
	Report

Westpac Stadium, Wellington

=== Pool C ===
Teams	Pld	W	D	L	PF	PA	+/−	Pts
Canada	3	3	0	0	70	31	+39	9
Argentina	3	2	0	1	41	50	−9	7
Scotland	3	0	1	2	45	53	−8	4
United States	3	0	1	2	45	67	−22	4

7 February 2014
13:00

Canada	17–14	Scotland
	Report

Westpac Stadium, Wellington

7 February 2014
13:21

Argentina	19–14	United States
	Report

Westpac Stadium, Wellington

7 February 2014
15:48

Canada	29–12	United States
	Report

Westpac Stadium, Wellington

7 February 2014
16:09

Argentina	17–12	Scotland
	Report

Westpac Stadium, Wellington

7 February 2014
18:56

Scotland	19–19	United States
	Report

Westpac Stadium, Wellington

7 February 2014
20:50

Canada	24–5	Argentina
	Report

Westpac Stadium, Wellington

=== Pool D ===
Teams	Pld	W	D	L	PF	PA	+/−	Pts
Australia	3	3	0	0	72	17	+55	9
Samoa	3	2	0	1	67	34	+33	7
Kenya	3	1	0	2	52	55	−3	5
Tonga	3	0	0	3	19	104	−85	3

7 February 2014
13:45

Samoa	24–12	Kenya
	Report

Westpac Stadium, Wellington

7 February 2014
14:03

Australia	33–5	Tonga
	Report

Westpac Stadium, Wellington

7 February 2014
16:30

Samoa	31–7	Tonga
	Report

Westpac Stadium, Wellington

7 February 2014
16:51

Australia	24–0	Kenya
	Report

Westpac Stadium, Wellington

7 February 2014
19:17

Kenya	40–7	Tonga
	Report

Westpac Stadium, Wellington

7 February 2014
21:12

Australia	12–15	Samoa
	Report

Westpac Stadium, Wellington

== Knockout stage ==
=== Shield ===
Quarter-finals
8 February 2014 – 13:00 – Westpac Stadium
Wales	19
Tonga	12
8 February 2014 – 13:22 – Westpac Stadium
Scotland	38
Spain	12
8 February 2014 – 13:44 – Westpac Stadium
Kenya	34
Portugal	0
8 February 2014 – 14:06 – Westpac Stadium
France	14
United States	12

Semi-finals
8 February 2014 – 16:10 – Westpac Stadium
Tonga	12
Spain	17
8 February 2014 – 16:30 – Westpac Stadium
Portugal	10
United States	31

Final
8 February 2014 – 01:30 – Westpac Stadium
Spain	12
United States	28

=== Bowl ===
Quarter-finals
8 February 2014 – : – Westpac Stadium
Wales	19
Tonga	12
8 February 2014 – 13:22 – Westpac Stadium
Scotland	38
Spain	12
8 February 2014 – 13:44 – Westpac Stadium
Kenya	34
Portugal	0
8 February 2014 – 14:06 – Westpac Stadium
France	14
United States	12

Semi-finals
8 February 2014 – 16:54 – Westpac Stadium
Wales	0
Scotland	28
8 February 2014 – 17:16 – Westpac Stadium
Kenya	24
France	7

Final
26 January 2014 – 20:00 – Westpac Stadium
Scotland	14
Kenya	24

=== Plate ===
Quarter-finals
8 February 2014 – 14:33 – Westpac Stadium
England	21
Samoa	5
8 February 2014 – 14:55 – Westpac Stadium
Canada	0
New Zealand	24
8 February 2014 – 15:17 – Westpac Stadium
Australia	0
South Africa	10
8 February 2014 – 15:39 – Westpac Stadium
Fiji	29
Argentina	7

Semi-finals
8 February 2014 – 17:38 – Westpac Stadium
Samoa	0
Canada	27
8 February 2014 – 18:00 – Westpac Stadium
Australia	34
Argentina	0

Final
26 January 2014 – 20:30 – Westpac Stadium
Canada	10
Australia	12

=== Cup ===
Quarter-finals
8 February 2014 – 14:33 – Westpac Stadium
England	21
Samoa	5
8 February 2014 – 14:55 – Westpac Stadium
Canada	0
New Zealand	24
8 February 2014 – 15:17 – Westpac Stadium
Australia	0
South Africa	10
8 February 2014 – 15:39 – Westpac Stadium
Fiji	29
Argentina	7

Semi-finals
8 February 2014 – 18:35 – Westpac Stadium
England	0
New Zealand	31
8 February 2014 – 19:00 – Westpac Stadium
South Africa	10
Fiji	0

Final
8 February 2014 – 21:30 – Westpac Stadium
New Zealand	21
South Africa	0
Third place
8 February 2014 – 21:00 – Westpac Stadium
England	7
Fiji	14
