= Lucio López Fleming =

Argentine rugby union player (born 1980)

- Born: 14 October 1980 (age 46) Salta, Argentina
- Height: 5 ft 6 in (168 cm)
- Weight: 165 lb (75 kg)

Rugby union career
- Position: Scrum-half / Wing
International career
Years	Team	Apps	(Points)
2004–08	Argentina	5	(20)

Lucio López Fleming (born 14 October 1980) is an Argentine former international rugby union player.

== Biography ==
A native of Salta, López Fleming got his start at hometown club Jockey Club Salta, but spent most of his career in Buenos Aires playing for San Isidro Club, where he was used mainly on the wing. He also had a short stint as a scrum-half with Scottish team Edinburgh during their 2006–07 season.

López Fleming played the majority of his international rugby with the national rugby sevens team, for which he scored 71 tries in Sevens World Series competition. He was a nominee for the 2004 World Rugby Men's Sevens Player of the Year. Between 2004 and 2008, López Fleming made occasional appearance for the Pumas XV.

== See also ==
- List of Argentina national rugby union players
