= 2014 Japan Sevens =

- IRB Sevens XV
- Host nation: Japan
- Date: 22–23 March 2014

Cup
- Champion: Fiji
- Runner-up: South Africa
- Third: England

Plate
- Winner: Australia
- Runner-up: United States

Bowl
- Winner: Wales
- Runner-up: Scotland

Shield
- Winner: Argentina
- Runner-up: Samoa

Tournament details
- Matches played: 45
- Tries scored: 267 (average 5.93 per match)
- Most points: (Fiji) Samisoni Viriviri (45)
- Most tries: (Fiji) Samisoni Viriviri (9)

The 2014 Japan Sevens was the continuation of the annual sporting event which was held on 22–23 March 2014. It was the third edition of the tournament and the sixth stop of the 2013–14 IRB Sevens World Series.

== Format ==
The teams were drawn into four pools of four teams each. Each team played everyone in their pool one time. The top two teams from each pool advanced to the Cup/Plate brackets. The bottom two teams from each group went to the Bowl/Shield brackets.

== Teams ==
The 16 participating teams are:

- Argentina
- Australia
- Canada
- England
- Fiji
- France
- Japan
- Kenya
- New Zealand
- Portugal
- Samoa
- Scotland
- South Africa
- Spain
- United States
- Wales

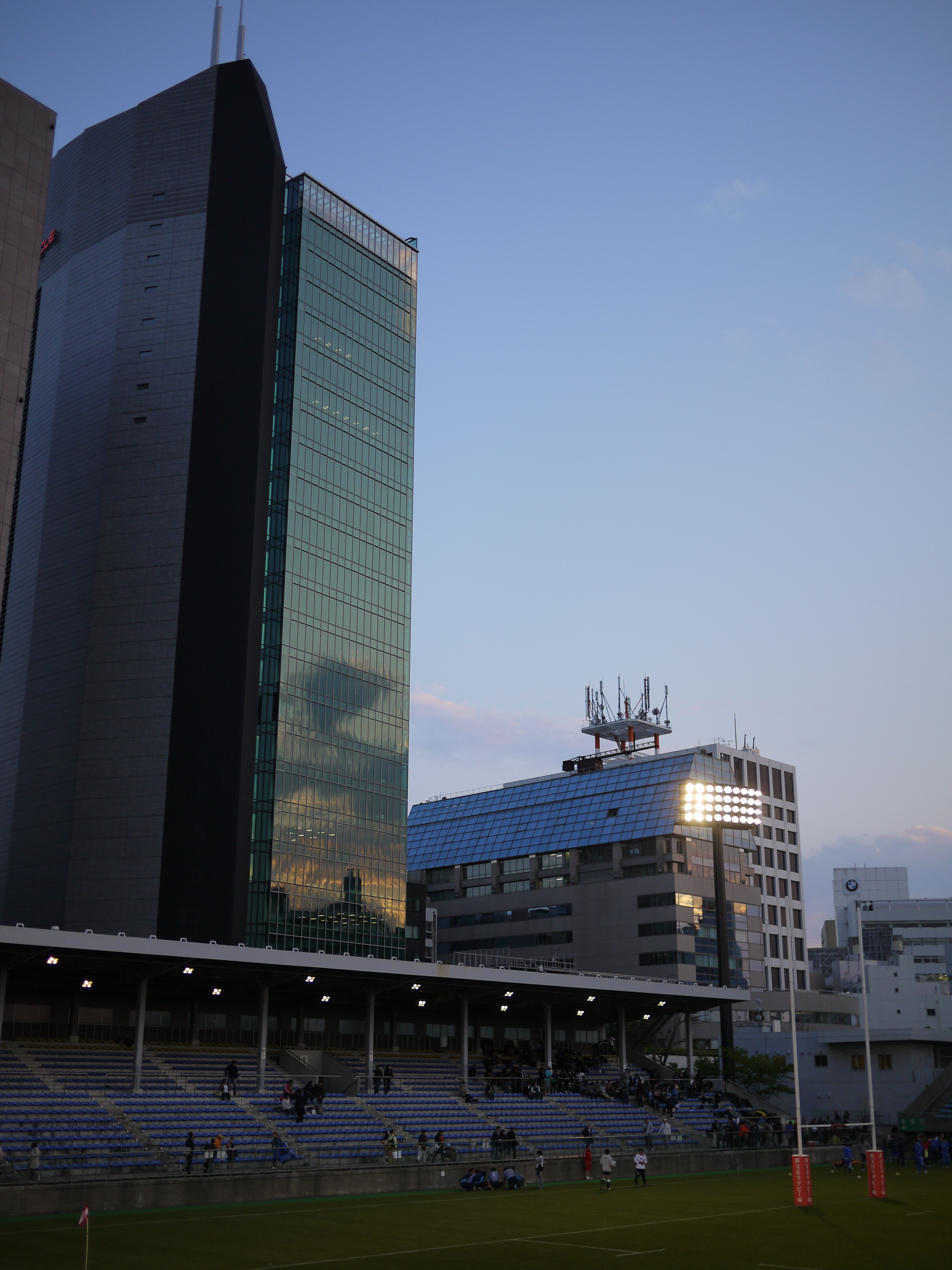
Sevens Festival

== Pool Stage ==
The draw was made on 20 February 2014.

Key to colours in group tables
Teams that advanced to the Cup Quarterfinal

=== Pool A ===
Teams	Pld	W	D	L	PF	PA	+/−	Pts
New Zealand	3	3	0	0	105	29	+76	9
Canada	3	1	1	1	74	44	30	6
Wales	3	1	1	1	51	67	–16	6
Portugal	3	0	0	3	19	109	–90	3

22 March 2014
11:28

New Zealand	43–5	Wales
	Report

Chichibunomiya Rugby Stadium, Tokyo

22 March 2014
11:50

Canada	40–5	Portugal
	Report

Chichibunomiya Rugby Stadium, Tokyo

22 March 2014
14:46

New Zealand	40–7	Portugal
	Report

Chichibunomiya Rugby Stadium, Tokyo

22 March 2014
15:08

Canada	17–17	Wales
	Report

Chichibunomiya Rugby Stadium, Tokyo

22 March 2014
18:58

Wales	29–7	Portugal
	Report

Chichibunomiya Rugby Stadium, Tokyo

22 March 2014
19:20

New Zealand	22–17	Canada
	Report

Chichibunomiya Rugby Stadium, Tokyo

=== Pool B ===
Teams	Pld	W	D	L	PF	PA	+/−	Pts
South Africa	3	3	0	0	87	29	+58	9
Kenya	3	2	0	1	48	40	+8	7
Argentina	3	0	1	2	33	66	–33	4
Japan	3	0	1	2	26	59	–33	4

22 March 2014
12:12

South Africa	26–12	Kenya
	Report

Chichibunomiya Rugby Stadium, Tokyo

22 March 2014
12:34

Argentina	14–14	Japan
	Report

Chichibunomiya Rugby Stadium, Tokyo

22 March 2014
15:30

Argentina	7–24	Kenya
	Report

Chichibunomiya Rugby Stadium, Tokyo

22 March 2014
15:52

South Africa	33–5	Japan
	Report

Chichibunomiya Rugby Stadium, Tokyo

22 March 2014
19:42

Kenya	12–7	Japan
	Report

Chichibunomiya Rugby Stadium, Tokyo

22 March 2014
20:04

South Africa	28–12	Argentina
	Report

Chichibunomiya Rugby Stadium, Tokyo

=== Pool C ===
Teams	Pld	W	D	L	PF	PA	+/−	Pts
Fiji	3	2	1	0	74	45	+29	8
United States	3	1	1	1	55	58	–3	6
Samoa	3	1	0	2	52	71	–19	5
France	3	1	0	2	55	62	–7	5

22 March 2014
10:00

Fiji	22–19	France
	Report

Chichibunomiya Rugby Stadium, Tokyo

22 March 2014
10:22

Samoa	17–24	United States
	Report

Chichibunomiya Rugby Stadium, Tokyo

22 March 2014
13:18

Fiji	19–19	United States
	Report

Chichibunomiya Rugby Stadium, Tokyo

22 March 2014
13:40

Samoa	28–14	France
	Report

Chichibunomiya Rugby Stadium, Tokyo

22 March 2014
17:30

France	22–12	United States
	Report

Chichibunomiya Rugby Stadium, Tokyo

22 March 2014
17:52

Fiji	33–7	Samoa
	Report

Chichibunomiya Rugby Stadium, Tokyo

=== Pool D ===
Teams	Pld	W	D	L	PF	PA	+/−	Pts
England	3	3	0	0	89	21	+68	9
Australia	3	2	0	1	75	50	+25	7
Scotland	3	1	0	2	43	67	–24	5
Spain	3	0	0	3	12	81	–69	3

22 March 2014
10:44

England	36–0	Scotland
	Report

Chichibunomiya Rugby Stadium, Tokyo

22 March 2014
11:06

Australia	28–7	Spain
	Report

Chichibunomiya Rugby Stadium, Tokyo

22 March 2014
14:02

England	29–0	Spain
	Report

Chichibunomiya Rugby Stadium, Tokyo

22 March 2014
14:24

Australia	26–19	Scotland
	Report

Chichibunomiya Rugby Stadium, Tokyo

22 March 2014
18:14

Scotland	24–5	Spain
	Report

Chichibunomiya Rugby Stadium, Tokyo

22 March 2014
18:36

England	24–21	Australia
	Report

Chichibunomiya Rugby Stadium, Tokyo

== Knockout stage ==
=== Shield ===
Quarter-finals
23 March 2014 – 09:00 – Chichibunomiya Rugby Stadium
Wales	24
Spain	19
23 March 2014 – 09:22 – Chichibunomiya Rugby Stadium
Samoa	12
Japan	42
23 March 2014 – 09:44 – Chichibunomiya Rugby Stadium
Scotland	12
Portugal	7
23 March 2014 – 10:06 – Chichibunomiya Rugby Stadium
Argentina	17
France	21

Semi-finals
23 March 2014 – 11:56 – Chichibunomiya Rugby Stadium
Spain	12
Samoa	24
31 March 2014 – 12:18 – Chichibunomiya Rugby Stadium
Portugal	21
Argentina	24

Final
23 March – 14:52 Chichibunomiya Rugby Stadium
Samoa	0
Argentina	26

=== Bowl ===
Quarter-finals
23 March 2014 – 09:00 – Chichibunomiya Rugby Stadium
Wales	24
Spain	19
23 March 2014 – 09:22 – Chichibunomiya Rugby Stadium
Samoa	12
Japan	42
23 March 2014 – 09:44 – Chichibunomiya Rugby Stadium
Scotland	12
Portugal	7
23 March 2014 – 10:06 – Chichibunomiya Rugby Stadium
Argentina	17
France	21

Semi-finals
23 March 2014 – 12:40 – Chichibunomiya Rugby Stadium
Wales	24
Japan	19
23 March 2014 – 13:02 – Chichibunomiya Rugby Stadium
Scotland	21
France	12

Final
23 March 2014 – 15:18 – Chichibunomiya Rugby Stadium
Wales	28
Scotland	21

=== Plate ===
Quarter-finals
23 March 2014 – 10:28 – Chichibunomiya Rugby Stadium
New Zealand	21
Australia	12
23 March 2014 – 10:50 – Chichibunomiya Rugby Stadium
Fiji	43
Kenya	19
23 March 2014 – 11:12 – Chichibunomiya Rugby Stadium
England	14
Canada	10
23 March 2014 – 11:34 – Chichibunomiya Rugby Stadium
South Africa	17
United States	12

Semi-finals
23 March 2014 – 13:24 – Chichibunomiya Rugby Stadium
Australia	36
Kenya	0
23 March 2014 – 13:46 – Chichibunomiya Rugby Stadium
Canada	15
United States	28

Final
23 March 2014 – 15:44 – Chichibunomiya Rugby Stadium
Australia	17
United States	12

=== Cup ===
Quarter-finals
23 March 2014 – 10:28 – Chichibunomiya Rugby Stadium
New Zealand	21
Australia	12
23 March 2014 – 10:50 – Chichibunomiya Rugby Stadium
Fiji	43
Kenya	19
23 March 2014 – 11:12 – Chichibunomiya Rugby Stadium
England	14
Canada	10
23 March 2014 – 11:34 – Chichibunomiya Rugby Stadium
South Africa	17
United States	12

Semi-finals
23 March 2014 – 14:08 – Chichibunomiya Rugby Stadium
New Zealand	12
Fiji	17
23 March – 14:30 – Chichibunomiya Rugby Stadium
England	0
South Africa	17

Final
23 March 2014 – 16:43 – Chichibunomiya Rugby Stadium
Fiji	33
South Africa	26
Third place
23 March 2014 – 16:10 – Chichibunomiya Rugby Stadium
New Zealand	12
England	21
