= 2014 USA Sevens =

- IRB Sevens XV
- Host nation: United States
- Date: 24–26 January 2014

Cup
- Champion: South Africa
- Runner-up: New Zealand
- Third: Canada

Plate
- Winner: England
- Runner-up: Australia

Bowl
- Winner: Fiji
- Runner-up: Kenya

Shield
- Winner: United States
- Runner-up: Spain

Tournament details
- Matches played: 45
- Tries scored: 241 (average 5.36 per match)
- Most points: (Australia) Cameron Clark (48)
- Most tries: (South Africa) Seabelo Senatla (6)

The 2014 USA Sevens (also sometimes referred to as the 2014 Las Vegas Sevens) was the eleventh edition of the USA Sevens tournament, and the fifth tournament of the 2013–14 IRB Sevens World Series. The tournament was held January 24–26, 2014 at Sam Boyd Stadium in Las Vegas, Nevada.

== Format ==
The teams were drawn into four pools of four teams each. Each team played everyone in their pool one time. The top two teams from each pool advanced to the Cup/Plate brackets. The bottom two teams from each group went to the Bowl/Shield brackets.

== Teams ==
The participating teams and schedule were announced on 30 November 2013.

- Argentina
- Australia
- Canada
- England
- Fiji
- France
- Kenya
- New Zealand
- Portugal
- Samoa
- Scotland
- South Africa
- Spain
- United States
- Uruguay
- Wales

== Pool stage ==
Key to colours in group tables
Teams that advanced to the Cup Quarterfinal

=== Pool A ===
Teams	Pld	W	D	L	PF	PA	+/−	Pts
South Africa	3	3	0	0	91	7	+84	9
Canada	3	2	0	1	38	63	-25	7
Kenya	3	1	0	2	43	53	−10	5
Wales	3	0	0	3	36	85	−49	3

24 January 2014
16:00

South Africa	43–0	Wales
	Report

Sam Boyd Stadium, Whitney, Nevada

24 January 2014
16:22

Kenya	15–17	Canada
	Report

Sam Boyd Stadium, Whitney, Nevada

24 January 2014
18:56

South Africa	29–0	Canada
	Report

Sam Boyd Stadium, Whitney, Nevada

24 January 2014
19:18

Kenya	21–17	Wales
	Report

Sam Boyd Stadium, Whitney, Nevada

25 January 2014
12:00

Wales	19–21	Canada
	Report

Sam Boyd Stadium, Whitney, Nevada

25 January 2014
14:12

South Africa	19–7	Kenya
	Report

Sam Boyd Stadium, Whitney, Nevada

=== Pool B ===
Teams	Pld	W	D	L	PF	PA	+/−	Pts
New Zealand	3	3	0	0	69	19	+50	9
Australia	3	2	0	1	55	59	−4	7
Fiji	3	1	0	2	52	34	+18	5
Scotland	3	0	0	3	12	76	−64	3

24 January 2014
16:44

New Zealand	31–7	Australia
	Report

Sam Boyd Stadium, Whitney, Nevada

24 January 2014
17:06

Fiji	24–0	Scotland
	Report

Sam Boyd Stadium, Whitney, Nevada

24 January 2014
19:40

New Zealand	26–5	Scotland
	Report

Sam Boyd Stadium, Whitney, Nevada

24 January 2014
20:02

Fiji	21–22	Australia
	Report

Sam Boyd Stadium, Whitney, Nevada

25 January 2014
12:22

Australia	26–7	Scotland
	Report

Sam Boyd Stadium, Whitney, Nevada

25 January 2014
13:50

New Zealand	12–7	Fiji
	Report

Sam Boyd Stadium, Whitney, Nevada

=== Pool C ===
Teams	Pld	W	D	L	PF	PA	+/−	Pts
Samoa	3	3	0	0	74	31	+43	9
England	3	2	0	1	116	27	+89	7
Portugal	3	1	0	2	19	94	–75	5
Uruguay	3	0	0	3	22	79	−57	3

24 January 2014
17:28

Samoa	22–19	England
	Report

Sam Boyd Stadium, Whitney, Nevada

24 January 2014
17:50

Portugal	19–5	Uruguay
	Report

Sam Boyd Stadium, Whitney, Nevada

24 January 2014
20:24

Samoa	17–12	Uruguay
	Report

Sam Boyd Stadium, Whitney, Nevada

24 January 2014
20:46

Portugal	0–54	England
	Report

Sam Boyd Stadium, Whitney, Nevada

25 January 2014
12:44

England	43–5	Uruguay
	Report

Sam Boyd Stadium, Whitney, Nevada

25 January 2014
13:28

Samoa	35–0	Portugal
	Report

Sam Boyd Stadium, Whitney, Nevada

=== Pool D ===
Teams	Pld	W	D	L	PF	PA	+/−	Pts
France	3	3	0	0	75	12	+63	9
Argentina	3	2	0	1	52	31	+21	7
United States	3	1	0	2	55	43	+12	5
Spain	3	0	0	3	15	111	−96	3

24 January 2014
18:12

Argentina	19–12	United States
	Report

Sam Boyd Stadium, Whitney, Nevada

24 January 2014
18:34

France	47–0	Spain
	Report

Sam Boyd Stadium, Whitney, Nevada

24 January 2014
21:08

Argentina	33–5	Spain
	Report

Sam Boyd Stadium, Whitney, Nevada

24 January 2014
21:30

France	14–12	United States
	Report

Sam Boyd Stadium, Whitney, Nevada

25 January 2014
13:06

Argentina	0–14	France
	Report

Sam Boyd Stadium, Whitney, Nevada

25 January 2014
14:34

United States	31–10	Spain
	Report

Sam Boyd Stadium, Whitney, Nevada

== Knockout stage ==
=== Shield ===
Quarter-finals
25 January 2014 – 16:24 – Sam Boyd Stadium
Kenya	24
Spain	0
25 January 2014 – 16:46 – Sam Boyd Stadium
Portugal	7
Scotland	31
25 January 2014 – 17:08 – Sam Boyd Stadium
United States	7
Wales	12
25 January 2014 – 17:30 – Sam Boyd Stadium
Fiji	38
Uruguay	14

Semi-finals
26 January 2014 – 09:20 – Sam Boyd Stadium
Spain	19
Portugal	12
26 January 2014 – 09:42 – Sam Boyd Stadium
United States	28
Uruguay	14

Final
26 January 2014 – 12:45 – Sam Boyd Stadium
Spain	0
United States	31

=== Bowl ===
Quarter-finals
25 January 2014 – 16:24 – Sam Boyd Stadium
Kenya	24
Spain	0
25 January 2014 – 16:46 – Sam Boyd Stadium
Portugal	7
Scotland	31
25 January 2014 – 17:08 – Sam Boyd Stadium
United States	7
Wales	12
25 January 2014 – 17:30 – Sam Boyd Stadium
Fiji	38
Uruguay	14

Semi-finals
26 January 2014 – 10:04 – Sam Boyd Stadium
Kenya	21
Scotland	7
26 January 2014 – 10:26 – Sam Boyd Stadium
Wales	12
Fiji	40

Final
26 January 2014 – 13:10 – Sam Boyd Stadium
Kenya	0
Fiji	35

=== Plate ===
Quarter-finals
25 January 2014 – 17:52 – Sam Boyd Stadium
South Africa	29
Argentina	0
25 January 2014 – 18:14 – Sam Boyd Stadium
Samoa	12
Australia	10
25 January 2014 – 18:36 – Sam Boyd Stadium
France	14
Canada	17
25 January 2014 – 18:58 – Sam Boyd Stadium
New Zealand	24
England	7

Semi-finals
26 January 2014 – 10:48 – Sam Boyd Stadium
Argentina	19
Australia	24
26 January 2014 – 11:10 – Sam Boyd Stadium
France	12
England	21

Final
26 January 2014 – 13:35 – Sam Boyd Stadium
Australia	24
England	26

=== Cup ===
Quarter-finals
25 January 2014 – 17:52 – Sam Boyd Stadium
South Africa	29
Argentina	0
25 January 2014 – 18:14 – Sam Boyd Stadium
Samoa	12
Australia	10
25 January 2014 – 18:36 – Sam Boyd Stadium
France	14
Canada	17
25 January 2014 – 18:58 – Sam Boyd Stadium
New Zealand	24
England	7

Semi-finals
26 January 2014 – 11:32 – Sam Boyd Stadium
South Africa	14
Samoa	0
26 January 2014 – 11:54 – Sam Boyd Stadium
Canada	7
New Zealand	26

Final
26 January 2014 – 14:25 – Sam Boyd Stadium
South Africa	14
New Zealand	7
Third place
26 January 2014 – 14:00 – Sam Boyd Stadium
Samoa	19
Canada	22
