= Argentina national rugby sevens team =

Argentina
- Union: Argentine Rugby Union
- Emblem: Puma
- Coach: Santiago Gómez Cora
- Captain: Santiago Álvarez
- Most caps: Santiago Gómez Cora (61)
- Top scorer: Santiago Gómez Cora (1,178)
- Most tries: Santiago Gómez Cora (230)
Team kit	Change kit

World Cup Sevens
- Appearances: 8 (First in 1993)
- Best result: Runners-up (2009)

Official website
- uar.com.ar/equipos-uar/los-pumas-7s/

Argentina national rugby sevens team
Medal record

Olympic Games
Bronze medal – third place	2020 Tokyo	Team

Rugby Sevens World Cup
Silver medal – second place	2009 Dubai	Team
Bronze medal – third place	2001 Mar del Plata	Team

World Games
Silver medal – second place	2013 Cali	
Bronze medal – third place	2005 Duisburg	

Rugby Sevens South American
Gold medal – first place	2006 Asunción	
Gold medal – first place	2007 Viña del Mar	
Gold medal – first place	2008 Punta del Este	
Gold medal – first place	2009 S J dos Campos	
Gold medal – first place	2010 Mar del Plata	
Gold medal – first place	2011 Bento Gonçalves	
Gold medal – first place	2013 Rio de Janeiro	
Gold medal – first place	2014 Santiago	
Gold medal – first place	2015 Santa Fe	
Gold medal – first place	2019 Santiago	
Gold medal – first place	2020 Valparaíso	
Silver medal – second place	2012 Rio de Janeiro	

Pan American Games
Gold medal – first place	2019 Lima	
Silver medal – second place	2011 Guadalajara	
Silver medal – second place	2015 Toronto	

The Argentina national rugby sevens team competes in the World Rugby Sevens Series, in the Rugby World Cup Sevens, and, beginning in 2016, in the Summer Olympics.

The Argentine rugby sevens team has had some success in the World Rugby Sevens Series, finishing third in 2003–04, and finishing among the top six teams in five out of six seasons from 2003–04 to 2008–09. Argentina won the USA Sevens tournament in 2004 and again in 2009. During its peak, the Argentine team was led by Santiago Gómez Cora, who is ranked all-time first in tries (230), fifth in points (1,178), and third in appearances (61).

Argentina's best finish at the Rugby World Cup Sevens came in 2009, when the team reached the finals and finished as runners up.

== Tournament history ==
(*): asterisk indicates a shared placing

=== Summer Olympic Games ===
Olympic Games record
Year	Round	Position	Pld	W	L	D
(Brazil) 2016	Quarter-finals	6th	6	3	3	0
(Japan) 2020	Bronze medal match	3rd	6	4	2	0
(France) 2024	Quarter-finals	7th	6	3	3	0
Total	Bronze medal match	3/3	18	10	8	0

Olympic Games History
2016	Pool stage	Argentina 17 – 14 United States	Win
2016	Pool stage	Argentina 14 – 21 Fiji	Loss
2016	Pool stage	Argentina 31 – 0 Brazil	Win
2016	Quarter-finals	Argentina 0 – 5 Great Britain	Loss
2016	5–8th place playoff Semi-final	Argentina 26 – 21 Australia	Win
2016	5–8th place playoff Fifth place	Argentina 14 – 17 New Zealand	Loss
2020	Pool stage	Argentina 29 – 19 Australia	Win
2020	Pool stage	Argentina 14 – 35 New Zealand	Loss
2020	Pool stage	Argentina 56 – 0 South Korea	Win
2020	Quarter-finals	Argentina 19 – 14 South Africa	Win
2020	Semi-finals	Argentina 14 – 26 Fiji	Loss
2020	Bronze medal	Argentina 17 – 12 Great Britain	Win
2024	Pool stage	Argentina 31 – 12 Kenya	Win
2024	Pool stage	Argentina 28 – 12 Samoa	Win
2024	Pool stage	Argentina 14 – 22 Australia	Loss
2024	Quarter-finals	Argentina 14 – 26 France	Loss
2024	5th–8th place playoff semi-final	Argentina 12 – 17 New Zealand	Loss
2024	5th–8th place playoff Seventh place	Argentina 19 – 0 United States	Win

=== Rugby World Cup Sevens ===
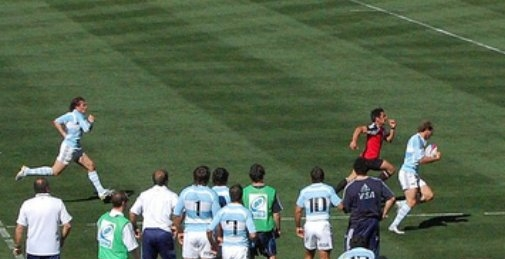
Argentina at the 2018 USA Sevens in San Diego

Rugby World Cup Sevens
Year	Round	Position	Pld	W	L	D
(Scotland) 1993	Plate final	9	7	5	2	0
(Hong Kong) 1997	Plate quarters	13*	5	2	3	0
(Argentina) 2001	Semifinals	(bronze)	7*	5	2	0
(Hong Kong) 2005	Quarterfinal	5*	6	4	2	0
(United Arab Emirates) 2009	Final	2nd place, silver medalist(s)	6	5	1	0
(Russia) 2013	Plate semifinal	11*	5	2	3	0
(United States) 2018	Quarterfinal	5	4	3	1	0
(South Africa) 2022	5th Place Final	5	4	3	1	0
Total	0 Titles	8/8	44	29	15	0

=== Pan American Games ===
Pan American Games
Year	Round	Position	Pld	W	L	D
(Mexico) 2011	Final	2nd place, silver medalist(s)	6	5	1	0
(Canada) 2015	Final	2nd place, silver medalist(s)	6	5	1	0
(Peru) 2019	Final	1st place, gold medalist(s)	5	5	0	0
(Chile) 2023	Final	1st place, gold medalist(s)	5	5	0	0
Total			17	15	2	0

=== World Games ===
World Games^{a}
Year	Round	Position	Pld	W	L	D
(Japan) 2001	did not participate					
(Germany) 2005	Third playoff	3rd place, bronze medalist(s)	5	3	2	0
(Chinese Taipei) 2009	Third playoff	4	6	4	2	0
(Colombia) 2013	Final	2nd place, silver medalist(s)	6	5	1	0
Total	0 Titles	3/4	17	12	5	0

== World Rugby Sevens Series ==
Argentina is a "core team" on the World Rugby Sevens Series. Their best season was the 2022–23 World Rugby Sevens Series, when they finished second.

Key to tournament locations
Africa and Middle East Asia	
Oceania Europe	
Americas	Argentine event

=== 2010s ===
Summary for Series XI to XX

World Sevens Series
XI 09–10	XII 10–11	XIII 11–12	XIV 12–13	XV 13–14
7th* Dubai	9th Dubai	4th Dubai	9th Dubai	5th Dubai
(bronze) rd* George	6th George	11th* Port Elizabeth	4th Port Elizabeth	4th Port Elizabeth
11th* Wellington	7th* Wellington	11th* Wellington	7th* Wellington	7th* Wellington
(bronze) rd* Adelaide	6th Adelaide	9th Gold Coast	5th Gold Coast	11th* Gold Coast
11th* Los Angeles	7th* Las Vegas	6th Las Vegas	6th Las Vegas	7th* Las Vegas
–	–	–	cancelled^{†} Mar Del Plata	–
13th* Hong Kong	13th* Hong Kong	6th Hong Kong	13th* Hong Kong	11th* Hong Kong
–	–	7th* Tokyo	10th Tokyo	13th Tokyo
6th Edinburgh	11th* Edinburgh	7th* Glasgow	6th Glasgow	10th Glasgow
(bronze) rd* London	7th* London	4th London	7th* London	10th London
8/8 62 pts 7th	8/8 38 pts 8th	9/9 92 pts 7th	9/9 84 pts 10th	9/9 75 pts 9th
Notes: * Shared placing (play-off matches for third were introduced in 2012).^{†} World 7s component cancelled due to demands on UAR joining The Rugby Championship.

World Rugby Sevens Series
XVI 14–15	XVII 15–16	XVIII 16–17	XIX 17–18	XX 18–19
5th Dubai	7th* Dubai	11th* Dubai	11th* Dubai	7th* Dubai
4th Port Elizabeth	(silver) nd Cape Town	10th Cape Town	(silver) nd Cape Town	9th Cape Town
10th Wellington	6th Wellington	5th Wellington	10th Hamilton	11th* Hamilton
6th Gold Coast	5th Sydney	7th* Sydney	(bronze) rd Sydney	9th Sydney
10th Las Vegas	7th* Las Vegas	7th* Las Vegas	(silver) nd Las Vegas	4th Las Vegas
–	7th* Vancouver	6th Vancouver	7th* Vancouver	7th* Vancouver
7th* Hong Kong	9th Hong Kong	6th Hong Kong	5th Hong Kong	5th Hong Kong
14th Tokyo	4th Singapore	13th Singapore	14th Singapore	7th* Singapore
10th Glasgow	4th Paris	9th Paris	9th Paris	7th* Paris
10th London	6th London	7th* London	11th* London	11th* London
9/9 80 pts 8th	10/10 119 pts 5th	10/10 90 pts 9th	10/10 105 pts 7th	10/10 94 pts 9th
Notes: * Shared placing (play-off matches for third were introduced in 2012). :^{†} World 7s component cancelled

== Players ==
=== Current squad ===
The following players have been selected to represent Argentina during the 2023–24 SVNS tournament beginning in December 2023.

Note: Caps reflect the total number of SVNS events competed in as of the 2023 Dubai Sevens.

Player	Position	Date of birth (age)	Caps	Club/province
Santiago Álvarez (c)	Forward	17 February 1994 (age 32)	56	Unattached
Luciano González	Forward	10 April 1997 (age 29)	49	Unattached
Santiago Mare	Forward	21 October 1996 (age 30)	28	Unattached
Marcos Moneta	Forward	7 March 2000 (age 26)	21	Unattached
Matías Osadczuk	Forward	22 April 1997 (age 29)	36	Unattached
Germán Schulz	Forward	5 February 1994 (age 32)	63	Unattached
Tomás Elizalde	Back	18 November 2000 (age 25)	9	Unattached
Agustín Fraga	Back	6 March 2002 (age 24)	18	Unattached
Matteo Graziano	Back	21 July 2001 (age 25)	14	Unattached
Alejo Lavayén	Back	5 May 2000 (age 26)	10	Unattached
Joaquín Pellandini	Back	27 May 1999 (age 27)	12	Unattached
Gastón Revol	Back	26 November 1986 (age 39)	99	Unattached
Tobías Wade	Back	6 August 1999 (age 27)	15	Unattached

== Records and statistics ==
=== Player records ===
The following shows leading career Argentina players based on performance in the World Rugby Sevens Series. Players in bold are still active.

Matches played
No.	Player	Matches
1	**Gastón Revol**	492
2	**Germán Schulz**	374
3	**Santiago Álvarez**	310
4	**Luciano González**	293
5	**Franco Sábato**	292
6	Nicolás Bruzzone	240
7	**Fernando Luna**	229
8	**Matías Osadczuk**	223
9	Santiago Gómez Cora	213
10	Francisco Merello	196

Tries scored
No.	Player	Tries
1	Santiago Gómez Cora	230
2	**Luciano González**	137
3	**Marcos Moneta**	129
4	**Franco Sábato**	128
5	**Matías Osadczuk**	117
6	**Germán Schulz**	110
7	Diego Palma	76
8	Lucio López Fleming	71
9	Francisco Merello	65
10	**Gastón Revol**	62

Points scored
No.	Player	Points
1	Gastón Revol	1,008
2	Luciano González	725
3	Marcos Moneta	651
4	Matías Osadczuk	587
5	Germán Schulz	550
6	Santiago Mare	405
7	Tobias Wade	340
8	Santiago Álvarez	279
9	Agustin Fraga	220
10	Joaquin Pellandini	190

=== Award winners ===
The following Argentina Sevens players have been recognised at the World Rugby Awards since 2004:

World Rugby Men's 7s Player of the Year
Year	Nominees	Winners
2004	Lucio López Fleming	—
2021	Marcos Moneta	**Marcos Moneta**
2023	Rodrigo Isgró	**Rodrigo Isgró**
2023	Marcos Moneta (2)	**Rodrigo Isgró**
2025	Luciano González	**Luciano González**

World Rugby Men's 7s Dream Team
Year	No.	Player
2024	7.	Matías Osadczuk
2025	2.	Luciano González
2025	4.	Marcos Moneta

=== Previous squads ===
- 2017–18 World Rugby Sevens Series

1993 RWC7s Squad
1. Lisandro Arbizu (Belgrano Athl.)
2. Pedro Baraldi (Jockey Club, Rosario)
3. Gonzalo Camardón (Alumni)
4. Fernando del Castillo (Jockey Club, Rosario)
5. Gonzalo García (Duendes)
6. Hernán García Simón (Pueyrredón)
7. Horacio Herrera (Córdoba Athl.)
8. Gustavo Jorge (Pucará)
9. Santiago Mesón (Tucumán R.C.)
10. Martín Terán (Tucumán R.C.)
11. Cristian Viel Temperley (Newman)

Coach:

- Ricardo Paganini
- Miguel Setién.

1997 RWC7s Squad
1. Lisandro Arbizu (Belgrano Athl.)
2. Cristian Viel Temperley (Newman)
3. Facundo Soler (Tala)
4. Gonzalo García (Duendes)
5. Pablo Bouza (Duendes)
6. Santiago Phelan (CASI)
7. Leandro Lobrauco (Atlético del Rosario)
8. Gonzalo Camardón (Alumni)
9. Eduardo Simone (Liceo Naval)
10. Marcos Garicoche (CASI)

Coach:

- Bernardo Otaño

2001 RWC7s Squad
1. Diego Albanese (Grenoble, FFR)
2. Pedro Baraldi (Jockey Club, Rosario)
3. Felipe Contepomi (Bristol, RFU)
4. Ignacio Corleto (Narbonne, FFR)
5. Martín Gaitán (CASI)
6. Francisco Leonelli (La Tablada)
7. José Núñez Piossek (Huirapuca)
8. Santiago Phelan (CASI)
9. Agustín Pichot (Bristol, RFU)
10. Hernán Senillosa (Hindú)

Coach:

- Gonzalo Albarracín.

2005 RWC7s Squad
1. Francisco Bosch (Hindú Club)
2. Lucas Borges (Pucará)
3. Juan Martín Fernández Lobbe (Liceo Naval)
4. Santiago Gomez Cora (Lomas Athletic)
5. Fernando Higgs (Los Tordos)
6. Francisco Leonelli Morey (La Tablada)
7. Lucio López Fleming (SIC)
8. Federico Martín Aramburú (Biarritz Olympique, FFR)
9. Andrés Romagnoli (San Fernando)
10. Martín Schusterman (Plymouth Albion, RFU)
11. Federico Serra Miras (SIC)

Coach:

- Hernán Rouco Oliva

2009 RWC7s Squad
1. Martín Bustos Moyano (Córdoba Athl.)
2. Dino Tomás Cáceres (Tucumán Lawn Tennis)
3. Gonzalo Camacho (Buenos Aires C&RC)
4. Agustín Figuerola (CASI)
5. Pablo Gómez Cora (Lomas Athletic)
6. Santiago Gomez Cora (Lomas Athletic)
7. Lucas González Amorosino (Pucará)
8. Lucio López Fleming (SIC)
9. Francisco Merello (Regatas Bella Vista)
10. Santiago Piccaluga (Newman)
11. Martín Rodríguez (Atlético del Rosario)
12. Horacio San Martín (Tala)

Coach:

- Duncan Forrester

2014 London Sevens Squad
1. Martin Chiappesoni
2. Felipe Nougues
3. Fernando Luna
4. Lucas de Vincenzi
5. Nicolas Coronel
6. Diego Palma
7. Ramiro Moyano
8. Franco Sabato
9. Joaquin Cachi Paz
10. Gaston Revol
11. Agustin Cortes
12. Gonzalo Gutierrez Taboada

== Tournament wins ==
Event	Venue	City	Cup		
Event	Venue	City	Winner	Final score	Runner-up
2004 USA	Home Depot Center	Los Angeles	Argentina	21–12	New Zealand
2009 USA	Petco Park	San Diego	Argentina	19–14	England
2022 Canada	BC Place	Vancouver	Argentina	29–10	Fiji
2023 New Zealand	Waikato Stadium	Hamilton	Argentina	14–12	New Zealand
2023 Canada	BC Place	Vancouver	Argentina	33–21	France
2023 London	Twickenham Stadium	London	Argentina	35–14	Fiji
2023 South Africa	Cape Town Stadium	Cape Town	Argentina	45–12	Australia
2024 Australia	HBF Park	Perth	Argentina	31–5	Australia
2024 Canada	BC Place	Vancouver	Argentina	36–12	New Zealand
2025 Australia	HBF Park	Perth	Argentina	41–5	Australia
2025 Canada	BC Place	Vancouver	Argentina	19–12	South Africa
2025 Hong Kong	Kai Tak Stadium	Hong Kong	Argentina	12–7	France

== Notes ==
^a Rugby sevens was discontinued at the World Games after 2013 due to the sport returning to the Olympics in 2016.
