= 2014 London Sevens =

- IRB Sevens XV
- Host nation: England
- Date: 10–11 May 2014

Cup
- Champion: New Zealand
- Runner-up: Australia
- Third: England

Plate
- Winner: South Africa
- Runner-up: Kenya

Bowl
- Winner: Canada
- Runner-up: Argentina

Shield
- Winner: United States
- Runner-up: Japan

Tournament details
- Matches played: 45
- Tries scored: 288 (average 6.4 per match)
- Most points: (South Africa) Seabelo Senatla (65 points)
- Most tries: (South Africa) Seabelo Senatla (13 tries)

The 2014 London Sevens was the eighth and final tournament of the 2013–14 IRB Sevens World Series. This edition of the London Sevens was hosted at Twickenham Stadium in London, England.

== Format ==
The sixteen teams competing were divided into four pools of four, who will play a round-robin within the pool. Points are awarded in each pool depending on the result; 3 for a win, 2 for a draw, 1 for a loss. The top two teams in each pool advanced to the Cup competition. The four quarterfinal losers dropped into the bracket for the Plate. The Bowl was contested by the third and fourth-place finishers in each pool, with the losers in the Bowl quarterfinals dropping into the bracket for the Shield.

== Teams ==
The competing teams were:

- Argentina
- Australia
- Canada
- England
- Fiji
- France
- Japan
- Kenya
- New Zealand
- Portugal
- Samoa
- Scotland
- South Africa
- Spain
- United States
- Wales

== Pool stage ==
The draw was made following the conclusion of the 2014 Scotland Sevens.

Key to colours in group tables
Teams that advance to the Cup Quarterfinal

=== Pool A ===
Teams	Pld	W	D	L	PF	PA	+/−	Pts
England	3	3	0	0	60	27	+33	9
New Zealand	3	2	0	1	101	25	+76	7
Argentina	3	1	0	2	48	78	−30	5
Wales	3	0	0	3	17	96	−79	3

10 May 2014
11:12

New Zealand	40–10	Argentina
	Report

Twickenham

10 May 2014
11:34

England	14–10	Wales
	Report

Twickenham

10 May 2014
14:18

New Zealand	49–0	Wales
	Report

Twickenham

10 May 2014
14:40

England	31–5	Argentina
	Report

Twickenham

10 May 2014
17:44

Argentina	33–7	Wales
	Report

Twickenham

10 May 2014
18:06

New Zealand	12–15	England
	Report

Twickenham

=== Pool B ===
Teams	Pld	W	D	L	PF	PA	+/−	Pts
Samoa	3	3	0	0	65	34	+31	9
Kenya	3	1	1	1	51	41	+10	6
Canada	3	1	1	1	51	55	−4	6
United States	3	0	0	3	34	71	−37	3

10 May 2014
09:00

Canada	12–19	Samoa
	Report

Twickenham

10 May 2014
09:22

Kenya	22–5	United States
	Report

Twickenham

10 May 2014
12:06

Canada	22–19	United States
	Report

Twickenham

10 May 2014
12:28

Kenya	12–19	Samoa
	Report

Twickenham

10 May 2014
15:32

Samoa	27–10	United States
	Report

Twickenham

10 May 2014
15:54

Canada	17–17	Kenya
	Report

Twickenham

=== Pool C ===
Teams	Pld	W	D	L	PF	PA	+/−	Pts
Australia	3	3	0	0	88	12	+76	9
Fiji	3	2	0	1	93	31	+62	7
Spain	3	1	0	2	34	88	−54	5
Japan	3	0	0	3	21	105	−84	3

10 May 2014
09:44

Fiji	38–0	Spain
	Report

Twickenham

10 May 2014
10:06

Australia	28–0	Japan
	Report

Twickenham

10 May 2014
12:50

Fiji	43–7	Japan
	Report

Twickenham

10 May 2014
13:12

Australia	36–0	Spain
	Report

Twickenham

10 May 2014
16:16

Spain	34–14	Japan
	Report

Twickenham

10 May 2014
16:38

Fiji	12–24	Australia
	Report

Twickenham

=== Pool D ===
Teams	Pld	W	D	L	PF	PA	+/−	Pts
South Africa	3	3	0	0	116	26	+90	9
France	3	2	0	1	80	71	+9	7
Scotland	3	1	0	2	53	45	+8	5
Portugal	3	0	0	3	26	133	−107	3

10 May 2014
10:28

Scotland	10–14	France
	Report

Twickenham

10 May 2014
10:50

South Africa	43–7	Portugal
	Report

Twickenham

10 May 2014
13:34

Scotland	31–5	Portugal
	Report

Twickenham

10 May 2014
13:56

South Africa	47–7	France
	Report

Twickenham

10 May 2014
17:00

France	59–14	Portugal
	Report

Twickenham

10 May 2014
17:22

Scotland	12–26	South Africa
	Report

Twickenham

== Knockout stage ==
=== Shield ===
Quarter-finals
11 May 2014 – 09:00 – Twickenham
Argentina	31
Portugal	0
11 May 2014 – 09:22 – Twickenham
Spain	26
United States	7
11 May 2014 – 09:44 – Twickenham
Scotland	19
Wales	24
11 May 2014 – 10:06 – Twickenham
Canada	21
Japan	19

Semi-finals
11 May 2014 – 12:06 – Twickenham
Portugal	7
United States	45
11 May 2014 – 12:28 – Twickenham
Scotland	19
Japan	26

Final
11 May 2014 – 15:22 – Twickenham
United States	36
Japan	12

=== Bowl ===
Quarter-finals
11 May 2014 – 09:00 – Twickenham
Argentina	31
Portugal	0
11 May 2014 – 09:22 – Twickenham
Spain	26
United States	7
11 May 2014 – 09:44 – Twickenham
Scotland	19
Wales	24
11 May 2014 – 10:06 – Twickenham
Canada	21
Japan	19

Semi-finals
11 May 2014 – 12:50 – Twickenham
Argentina	21
Spain	14
11 May 2014 – 13:12 – Twickenham
Wales	14
Canada	17

Final
11 May 2014 – 15:47 – Twickenham
Argentina	19
Canada	31

=== Plate ===
Quarter-finals
11 May 2014 – 10:28 – Twickenham
England	19
France	17
11 May 2014 – 10:50 – Twickenham
Australia	12
Kenya	5
11 May 2014 – 11:12 – Twickenham
South Africa	5
New Zealand	32
11 May 2014 – 11:34 – Twickenham
Samoa	10
Fiji	26

Semi-finals
11 May 2014 – 13:34 – Twickenham
France	19
Kenya	28
11 May 2014 – 13:56 – Twickenham
South Africa	24
Samoa	17

Final
11 May 2014 – 16:12 – Twickenham
Kenya	14
South Africa	38

=== Cup ===
Quarter-finals
11 May 2014 – 10:28 – Twickenham
England	19
France	17
11 May 2014 – 10:50 – Twickenham
Australia	12
Kenya	5
11 May 2014 – 11:12 – Twickenham
South Africa	5
New Zealand	32
11 May 2014 – 11:34 – Twickenham
Samoa	10
Fiji	26

Semi-finals
11 May 2014 – 14:18 – Twickenham
England	12
Australia	15
11 May 2014 – 14:40 – Twickenham
New Zealand	12
Fiji	10

Final
11 May 2014 – 17:02 – Twickenham
Australia	33
New Zealand	52
Third place
11 May 2014 – 16:37 – Twickenham
England	26
Fiji	19
