= 2013 South Africa Sevens =

- IRB Sevens XV
- Host nation: South Africa
- Date: 7–8 December 2013

Cup
- Champion: South Africa
- Runner-up: New Zealand
- Third: Samoa

Plate
- Winner: Fiji
- Runner-up: France

Bowl
- Winner: England
- Runner-up: Australia

Shield
- Winner: Scotland
- Runner-up: Canada

Tournament details
- Matches played: 45
- Tries scored: 279 (average 6.2 per match)
- Most points: (New Zealand) Tomasi Cama (51)
- Most tries: (Australia) Shannon Walker (9)

The 2013 South Africa Sevens was the third tournament within the 2013–2014 Sevens World Series. It was held over the weekend of 7–8 December 2013 at Nelson Mandela Bay Stadium in Port Elizabeth, with South Africa emerging the winners.

== Format ==
The teams were drawn into four pools of four teams each. Each team played everyone in their pool one time. The top two teams from each pool advanced to the Cup/Plate brackets. The bottom two teams from each group went to the Bowl/Shield brackets.

== Teams ==
The participating teams and schedule were announced on 30 November 2013.

- Argentina
- Australia
- Canada
- England
- Fiji
- France
- Kenya
- New Zealand
- Portugal
- Samoa
- Scotland
- South Africa
- Spain
- United States
- Wales
- Zimbabwe

== Pool stage ==
Key to colours in group tables
| Teams that advance to the Cup Quarterfinal |

=== Pool A ===
| Team | Pld | W | D | L | PF | PA | PD | Pts |
|---|---|---|---|---|---|---|---|---|
| Fiji | 3 | 3 | 0 | 0 | 82 | 24 | +58 | 9 |
| France | 3 | 2 | 0 | 1 | 59 | 60 | −1 | 7 |
| Australia | 3 | 1 | 0 | 2 | 48 | 64 | −16 | 5 |
| Scotland | 3 | 0 | 0 | 3 | 52 | 93 | −41 | 3 |

7 December 2013
11:00

| Fiji | 26–5 | Australia |
| | Report |

Nelson Mandela Bay Stadium, Port Elizabeth

7 December 2013
12:50

| Scotland | 21–33 | France |
| | Report |

Nelson Mandela Bay Stadium, Port Elizabeth

7 December 2013
15:34

| Fiji | 27–7 | France |
| | Report |

Nelson Mandela Bay Stadium, Port Elizabeth

7 December 2013
15:56

| Scotland | 19–31 | Australia |
| | Report |

Nelson Mandela Bay Stadium, Port Elizabeth

7 December 2013
18:52

| Australia | 12–19 | France |
| | Report |

Nelson Mandela Bay Stadium, Port Elizabeth

7 December 2013
19:14

| Fiji | 29–12 | Scotland |
| | Report |

Nelson Mandela Bay Stadium, Port Elizabeth

=== Pool B ===
| Team | Pld | W | D | L | PF | PA | PD | Pts |
|---|---|---|---|---|---|---|---|---|
| South Africa | 3 | 3 | 0 | 0 | 89 | 14 | +75 | 9 |
| Kenya | 3 | 2 | 0 | 1 | 69 | 39 | +30 | 7 |
| Spain | 3 | 1 | 0 | 2 | 26 | 78 | −52 | 5 |
| Canada | 3 | 0 | 0 | 3 | 31 | 74 | −43 | 3 |

7 December 2013
13:12

| South Africa | 24–7 | Canada |
| | Report |

Nelson Mandela Bay Stadium, Port Elizabeth

7 December 2013
13:34

| Kenya | 28–0 | Spain |
| | Report |

Nelson Mandela Bay Stadium, Port Elizabeth

7 December 2013
16:18

| South Africa | 38–0 | Spain |
| | Report |

Nelson Mandela Bay Stadium, Port Elizabeth

7 December 2013
16:40

| Kenya | 34–12 | Canada |
| | Report |

Nelson Mandela Bay Stadium, Port Elizabeth

7 December 2013
19:36

| Canada | 12–26 | Spain |
| | Report |

Nelson Mandela Bay Stadium, Port Elizabeth

7 December 2013
19:58

| South Africa | 27–7 | Kenya |
| | Report |

Nelson Mandela Bay Stadium, Port Elizabeth

=== Pool C ===
| Team | Pld | W | D | L | PF | PA | PD | Pts |
|---|---|---|---|---|---|---|---|---|
| New Zealand | 3 | 3 | 0 | 0 | 134 | 14 | +120 | 9 |
| Portugal | 3 | 2 | 0 | 1 | 61 | 77 | −16 | 7 |
| Wales | 3 | 1 | 0 | 2 | 50 | 86 | −36 | 5 |
| United States | 3 | 0 | 0 | 3 | 34 | 102 | −68 | 3 |

7 December 2013
11:00

| New Zealand | 43–0 | Portugal |
| | Report |

Nelson Mandela Bay Stadium, Port Elizabeth

7 December 2013
11:22

| Wales | 26–10 | United States |
| | Report |

Nelson Mandela Bay Stadium, Port Elizabeth

7 December 2013
14:06

| New Zealand | 43–7 | United States |
| | Report |

Nelson Mandela Bay Stadium, Port Elizabeth

7 December 2013
14:28

| Wales | 17–28 | Portugal |
| | Report |

Nelson Mandela Bay Stadium, Port Elizabeth

7 December 2013
17:14

| Portugal | 33–17 | United States |
| | Report |

Nelson Mandela Bay Stadium, Port Elizabeth

7 December 2013
17:36

| New Zealand | 48–7 | Wales |
| | Report |

Nelson Mandela Bay Stadium, Port Elizabeth

=== Pool D ===
| Team | Pld | W | D | L | PF | PA | PD | Pts |
|---|---|---|---|---|---|---|---|---|
| Argentina | 3 | 3 | 0 | 0 | 78 | 43 | +35 | 9 |
| Samoa | 3 | 2 | 0 | 1 | 86 | 40 | +46 | 7 |
| England | 3 | 1 | 0 | 2 | 68 | 52 | +16 | 5 |
| Zimbabwe | 3 | 0 | 0 | 3 | 12 | 109 | −97 | 3 |

7 December 2013
11:44

| England | 14–24 | Samoa |
| | Report |

Nelson Mandela Bay Stadium, Port Elizabeth

7 December 2013
12:06

| Argentina | 31–5 | Zimbabwe |
| | Report |

Nelson Mandela Bay Stadium, Port Elizabeth

7 December 2013
14:50

| England | 35–7 | Zimbabwe |
| | Report |

Nelson Mandela Bay Stadium, Port Elizabeth

7 December 2013
15:12

| Argentina | 26–19 | Samoa |
| | Report |

Nelson Mandela Bay Stadium, Port Elizabeth

7 December 2013
17:58

| Samoa | 43–0 | Zimbabwe |
| | Report |

Nelson Mandela Bay Stadium, Port Elizabeth

7 December 2013
18:20

| England | 19–21 | Argentina |
| | Report |

Nelson Mandela Bay Stadium, Port Elizabeth

== Knockout stage ==
=== Shield ===
Quarter-finals
8 December 2013 - 11:11 - NMBS, Port Elizabeth
Australia | 38
Zimbabwe | 5
8 December 2013 - 11:33 - NMBS, Port Elizabeth
Wales | 24
Canada | 19
8 December 2013 - 11:55 - NMBS, Port Elizabeth
England | 19
Scotland | 7
8 December 2013 - 12:17 - NMBS, Port Elizabeth
Spain | 14
United States | 19

Semi-finals
8 December 2013 - 14:17 - NMBS, Port Elizabeth
Zimbabwe | 10
Canada | 24
8 December 2013 - 14:39 - NMBS, Port Elizabeth
Scotland | 33
Spain | 10

Final
8 December 2013 - 17:43 - NMBS, Port Elizabeth
Canada | 12
Scotland | 19

=== Bowl ===
Quarter-finals
8 December 2013 - 11:11 - NMBS, Port Elizabeth
Australia | 38
Zimbabwe | 5
8 December 2013 - 11:33 - NMBS, Port Elizabeth
Wales | 24
Canada | 19
8 December 2013 - 11:55 - NMBS, Port Elizabeth
England | 19
Scotland | 7
8 December 2013 - 12:17 - NMBS, Port Elizabeth
Spain | 14
United States | 19

Semi-finals
8 December 2013 - 15:01 - NMBS, Port Elizabeth
Australia | 33
Wales | 21
8 December 2013 - 15:23 - NMBS, Port Elizabeth
England | 33
United States | 14

Final
8 December 2013 - 18:08 - NMBS, Port Elizabeth
Australia | 19
England | 28

=== Plate ===
Quarter-finals
8 December 2013 - 12:39 - NMBS, Port Elizabeth
Fiji | 12
Samoa | 28
8 December 2013 - 13:01 - NMBS, Port Elizabeth
New Zealand | 19
Kenya | 0
8 December 2013 - 13:23 - NMBS, Port Elizabeth
Argentina | 14
France | 7
8 December 2013 - 13:45 - NMBS, Port Elizabeth
South Africa | 45
Portugal | 0

Semi-finals
8 December 2013 - 16:05 - NMBS, Port Elizabeth
Fiji | 52
Kenya | 5
8 December 2013 - 16:27 - NMBS, Port Elizabeth
France | 17
Portugal | 12

Final
8 December 2013 - 18:33 - NMBS, Port Elizabeth
Fiji | 45
France | 19

=== Cup ===
Quarter-finals
8 December 2013 - 12:39 - NMBS, Port Elizabeth
Fiji | 12
Samoa | 28
8 December 2013 - 13:01 - NMBS, Port Elizabeth
New Zealand | 19
Kenya | 0
8 December 2013 - 13:23 - NMBS, Port Elizabeth
Argentina | 14
France | 7
8 December 2013 - 13:45 - NMBS, Port Elizabeth
South Africa | 45
Portugal | 0

Semi-finals
8 December 2013 - 16:49 - NMBS, Port Elizabeth
Samoa | 5
New Zealand | 19
8 December 2013 - 17:11 - NMBS, Port Elizabeth
Argentina | 0
South Africa | 31

Final
8 December 2013 - 19:30 - NMBS, Port Elizabeth
New Zealand | 14
South Africa | 17
Third place
8 December 2013 - 18:58 - NMBS, Port Elizabeth
Samoa | 21
Argentina | 7
