= 2013–14 IRB Sevens World Series =

2013–14 World Rugby Sevens
- Series XV
- Hosts: Australia; United Arab Emirates; United States; South Africa; New Zealand; Japan; Hong Kong; Scotland; England
- Date: 12 October 2013 – 11 May 2014

Final positions
- Champions: New Zealand
- Runners-up: South Africa
- Third: Fiji

The 2013–14 IRB Sevens World Series, known for sponsorship reasons as the HSBC Sevens World Series, was the 15th annual series of rugby union sevens tournaments for full national sides. The IRB Sevens World Series has been run by the International Rugby Board since 1999–2000. New Zealand emerged as champions, defeating South Africa.

== Itinerary ==
2013–14 Itinerary
Leg	Venue	Date	Winner
Australia	Skilled Park, Gold Coast	12–13 October 2013	New Zealand
Dubai	The Sevens, Dubai	29–30 November 2013	Fiji
South Africa	Nelson Mandela Bay Stadium, Port Elizabeth	7–8 December 2013	South Africa
United States	Sam Boyd Stadium, Las Vegas	24–26 January 2014	South Africa
New Zealand	Westpac Stadium, Wellington	7–8 February 2014	New Zealand
Japan	Chichibunomiya Rugby Stadium, Tokyo	22–23 March 2014	Fiji
Hong Kong	Hong Kong Stadium, Hong Kong	28–30 March 2014	New Zealand
Scotland	Scotstoun Stadium, Glasgow	3–4 May 2014	New Zealand
England	Twickenham Stadium, London	10–11 May 2014	New Zealand

== Core teams ==
For each season, there are 15 "core teams" that receive guaranteed berths in all events for that season's series. These teams were either placed in the top 12 of the standings before the 2013 London Sevens, or qualified during the World Series Core Team Qualifier held as part of the London Sevens. All 15 core teams from the 2012–13 season retained their core team status. The 2013–14 core teams were:

- Argentina
- Australia
- Canada
- England
- Fiji
- France
- Kenya
- New Zealand
- Portugal
- Samoa
- Scotland
- South Africa
- Spain
- United States
- Wales

=== Changes to core team qualifying ===
On 9 October 2013, the IRB announced significant changes to the promotion/relegation process.

First, only one promotion place was available for the 2014–15 series. Also, the World Series Pre-Qualifier, which was a 12-team tournament contested as part of the 2013 Hong Kong Sevens, was folded into the Core Team Qualifier, which involved 12 teams and was entirely contested at the Hong Kong Sevens. The bottom-placed core team at the end of the season will now be automatically relegated, with no opportunity to retain core status.

The remaining three core teams for 2013–14 were determined in a two-stage qualifying process:

- The first stage was a World Series Qualifier held as part of the Hong Kong Sevens. Two qualifiers from each of the IRB's six regions competed. The 12 teams were drawn into pools, with the top eight teams advancing to a quarterfinal round. The winners of the four quarterfinal matches advanced to the final qualifying stage.
- The final qualifying stage, the World Series Core Team Qualifier, was held as part of the London Sevens. The qualifying teams were joined by the winner of the HSBC Asian Sevens Series, plus the bottom three core teams following the Scotland Sevens. The qualifying tournament was conducted with a pool stage followed by knockout play, with the two finalists and the winner of the third-place match becoming core teams for the following season.

== Standings ==
The final standings after completion of the nine tournaments of the series are shown in the table below.

The points awarded to teams at each tournament, as well as the overall season totals, are shown. Gold indicates the event champions. Silver indicates the event runner-ups. Bronze indicates the event third place finishers. A zero (0) is recorded in the event column where a team competed in a tournament but did not gain any points. A dash (–) is recorded in the event column if a team did not compete at a tournament.

2013–14 IRB Sevens – Series XV
Pos.	Event Team	Gold Coast	Dubai	Port Elizabeth	Las Vegas	Wellington	Tokyo	Hong Kong	Glasgow	London	Points total
1	New Zealand	22	17	19	19	22	15	22	22	22	180
2	South Africa	15	19	22	22	19	19	13	10	13	152
3	Fiji	13	22	13	8	17	22	17	17	15	144
4	England	17	15	8	13	15	17	19	13	17	134
5	Australia	19	8	7	12	13	13	15	10	19	116
6	Canada	7	5	2	17	12	10	10	19	8	90
7	Kenya	12	10	10	7	8	10	3	12	12	84
8	Samoa	10	5	17	15	10	2	5	5	10	79
9	Argentina	5	13	15	10	10	3	5	7	7	75
10	France	8	3	12	10	5	5	7	8	10	68
11	Wales	10	12	5	5	5	8	12	3	5	65
12	Scotland	5	10	3	5	7	7	8	15	1	61
13	United States	3	1	5	3	3	12	10	1	3	41
14	Portugal	2	7	10	1	1	1	2	1	1	26
15	Spain	1	2	1	2	2	1	1	5	5	20
16	Japan	–	–	–	–	–	5	–	2	2	9
17	Tonga	1	–	–	–	1	–	–	–	–	2
18	Russia	–	1	–	–	–	–	–	–	–	1
18	Uruguay	–	–	–	1	–	–	–	–	–	1
18	Zimbabwe	–	–	1	–	–	–	–	–	–	1
18	Sri Lanka	–	–	–	–	–	–	1	–	–	1

Source: IRB (Archived)

Legend<span
Event Medalists
Gold	Event Champions
Silver	Event Runner-ups
Bronze	Event Third place finishers
Qualification for the 2014–15 World Sevens Series
No colour	Core team in 2013–14 and re-qualified as a core team for the 2014–15 World Rugby Sevens Series
Pink	Relegated as the lowest placed core team at the end of the 2013–14 Series
Yellow	Invited team

== Player statistics ==
=== Points scored ===
Points scored
Pos.	Player	Points
1	Tom Mitchell (ENG)	358
2	Samisoni Viriviri (FIJ)	260
3	Gillies Kaka (NZL)	258
4	Emosi Mulevoro (FIJ)	246
5	Cameron Clark (AUS)	229
6	Colin Gregor (SCO)	204
7	Phil Mack (CAN)	202
8	Branco du Preez (RSA)	200
9	Justin Geduld (RSA)	190
10	Tim Mikkelson (NZL)	169

Updated May 20 2014

=== Tries scored ===
Tries scored
Pos.	Player	Tries
1	Samisoni Viriviri (FIJ)	52
2	Tim Mikkelson (NZL)	33
3	Tom Mitchell (ENG)	32
4	Collins Injera (KEN)	30
4	Diego Palma (ARG)	30
6	Julien Candelon (FRA)	29
6	Seabelo Senatla (RSA)	29
8	Scott Curry (NZL)	28
8	Justin Geduld (RSA)	28
10	Benito Masilevu (FIJ)	27
10	Dan Norton (ENG)	27

Updated May 20 2014

== Tournaments ==
=== Gold Coast ===
Event	Winners	Score	Finalists	Semifinalists
Cup	New Zealand	40–19	Australia	England (Third); South Africa
Plate	Fiji	36–0	Kenya	Samoa; Wales
Bowl	France	19–14	Canada	Scotland; Argentina
Shield	United States	22–0	Portugal	Spain; Tonga

=== Dubai ===
Event	Winners	Score	Finalists	Semifinalists
Cup	Fiji	29–17	South Africa	New Zealand (Third); England
Plate	Argentina	21–5	Wales	Scotland; Kenya
Bowl	Australia	17–12	Portugal	Canada; Samoa
Shield	France	28–17	Spain	Russia; United States

=== South Africa ===
Event	Winners	Score	Finalists	Semifinalists
Cup	South Africa	17–14	New Zealand	Samoa (Third); Argentina
Plate	Fiji	45–19	France	Kenya; Portugal
Bowl	England	28–19	Australia	Wales; United States
Shield	Scotland	19–12	Canada	Zimbabwe; Spain

=== United States ===
Event	Winners	Score	Finalists	Semifinalists
Cup	South Africa	14–7	New Zealand	Samoa; Canada (Third)
Plate	England	26–24	Australia	Argentina; France
Bowl	Fiji	35–0	Kenya	Scotland; Wales
Shield	United States	31–0	Spain	Portugal; Uruguay

=== Wellington ===
Event	Winners	Score	Finalists	Semifinalists
Cup	New Zealand	21–0	South Africa	England; Fiji (Third)
Plate	Australia	12–10	Canada	Samoa; Argentina
Bowl	Kenya	24–14	Scotland	Wales; France
Shield	United States	28–12	Spain	Tonga; Portugal

=== Japan ===
Event	Winners	Score	Finalists	Semifinalists
Cup	Fiji	33–26	South Africa	England (Third); New Zealand
Plate	Australia	17–12	United States	Kenya; Canada
Bowl	Wales	28–21	Scotland	Japan; France
Shield	Argentina	26–0	Samoa	Spain; Portugal

=== Hong Kong ===
Event	Winners	Score	Finalists	Semifinalists
Cup	New Zealand	26–7	England	Fiji (Third); Australia
Plate	South Africa	19–14	Wales	United States; Canada
Bowl	Scotland	31–5	France	Argentina; Samoa
Shield	Kenya	17–10	Portugal	Spain; Sri Lanka

=== Scotland ===
Event	Winners	Score	Finalists	Semifinalists
Cup	New Zealand	54–7	Canada	Fiji (Third); Scotland
Plate	England	26–5	Kenya	Australia; South Africa
Bowl	France	20–14	Argentina	Samoa; Spain
Shield	Wales	29–12	Japan	United States; Portugal

=== London ===
Event	Winners	Score	Finalists	Semifinalists
Cup	New Zealand	52–33	Australia	England (Third); Fiji
Plate	South Africa	38–14	Kenya	France; Samoa
Bowl	Canada	31–19	Argentina	Spain; Wales
Shield	United States	36–12	Japan	Portugal; Scotland
