= 2014 Scotland Sevens =

Rugby sevens tournament

- IRB Sevens XV
- Host nation: Scotland
- Date: 3–4 May 2014

Cup
- Champion: New Zealand
- Runner-up: Canada
- Third: Fiji

Plate
- Winner: England
- Runner-up: Kenya

Bowl
- Winner: France
- Runner-up: Argentina

Shield
- Winner: Wales
- Runner-up: Japan

Tournament details
- Matches played: 45
- Tries scored: 248 (average 5.51 per match)

The 2014 Scotland Sevens was the eighth tournament within the 2013-2014 Sevens World Series. It was held over the weekend of 3–4 May 2014 at Scotstoun Stadium in Glasgow.

== Format ==
The teams were drawn into four pools of four teams each. Each team played everyone in their pool once. The top two teams from each pool advanced to the Cup/Plate brackets. The bottom two teams went into the Bowl/Shield brackets.

== Teams ==
The pools and schedule were announced on 7 April 2014.

- Argentina
- Australia
- Canada
- England
- Fiji
- France
- Japan
- Kenya
- New Zealand
- Portugal
- Samoa
- Scotland
- South Africa
- Spain
- United States
- Wales

== Pool Stage ==
Key to colours in group tables
Teams that advanced to the Cup Quarterfinal

=== Pool A ===
Teams	Pld	W	D	L	PF	PA	+/−	Pts
New Zealand	3	3	0	0	83	12	+71	9
South Africa	3	2	0	1	83	19	+64	7
Samoa	3	1	0	2	35	71	−36	5
Portugal	3	0	0	3	5	104	−99	3

3 May 2014
11:58

New Zealand	26–7	Samoa
	Report

Scotstoun Stadium

3 May 2014
12:20

South Africa	38–0	Portugal
	Report

Scotstoun Stadium

3 May 2014
15:04

New Zealand	38–0	Portugal
	Report

Scotstoun Stadium

3 May 2014
15:26

South Africa	40–0	Samoa
	Report

Scotstoun Stadium

3 May 2014
18:15

Samoa	28–5	Portugal
	Report

Scotstoun Stadium

3 May 2014
18:37

New Zealand	19–5	South Africa
	Report

Scotstoun Stadium

=== Pool B ===
Teams	Pld	W	D	L	PF	PA	+/−	Pts
Canada	3	2	1	0	87	19	+68	8
England	3	2	1	0	61	36	+25	8
France	3	1	0	2	48	54	−6	5
Japan	3	0	0	3	29	116	−87	3

3 May 2014
11:14

England	21–5	France
	Report

Scotstoun Stadium

3 May 2014
11:36

Canada	52–0	Japan
	Report

Scotstoun Stadium

3 May 2014
14:20

England	33–24	Japan
	Report

Scotstoun Stadium

3 May 2014
14:42

Canada	28–12	France
	Report

Scotstoun Stadium

3 May 2014
17:31

England	7–7	Canada
	Report

Scotstoun Stadium

3 May 2014
17:53

France	31–5	Japan
	Report

Scotstoun Stadium

=== Pool C ===
Teams	Pld	W	D	L	PF	PA	+/−	Pts
Fiji	3	3	0	0	95	24	+71	9
Kenya	3	1	0	2	69	67	+2	5
Argentina	3	1	0	2	54	76	−22	5
Wales	3	1	0	2	41	92	−51	5

3 May 2014
10:30

Fiji	26–7	Argentina
	Report

Scotstoun Stadium

3 May 2014
10:52

Wales	24–19	Kenya
	Report

Scotstoun Stadium

3 May 2014
13:36

Fiji	24–17	Kenya
	Report

Scotstoun Stadium

3 May 2014
13:58

Wales	17–28	Argentina
	Report

Scotstoun Stadium

3 May 2014
16:47

Fiji	45–0	Wales
	Report

Scotstoun Stadium

3 May 2014
17:09

Argentina	19–33	Kenya
	Report

Scotstoun Stadium

=== Pool D ===
Teams	Pld	W	D	L	PF	PA	+/−	Pts
Scotland	3	3	0	0	78	19	+59	9
Australia	3	2	0	1	77	40	+37	7
Spain	3	1	0	2	36	76	−40	5
United States	3	0	0	3	21	77	−56	3

3 May 2014
12:42

Australia	7–19	Scotland
	Report

Scotstoun Stadium

3 May 2014
13:04

United States	7–17	Spain
	Report

Scotstoun Stadium

3 May 2014
15:48

Australia	36–7	Spain
	Report

Scotstoun Stadium

3 May 2014
16:10

United States	0–26	Scotland
	Report

Scotstoun Stadium

3 May 2014
18:59

Australia	34–14	United States
	Report

Scotstoun Stadium

3 May 2014
19:21

Scotland	33–12	Spain
	Report

Scotstoun Stadium

== Knockout stage ==
=== Shield ===
Quarter-finals
4 May 2014 – 10:30 – Scotstoun Stadium
Samoa	31
United States	12
4 May 2014 – 10:52 – Scotstoun Stadium
Argentina	35
Japan	7
4 May 2014 – 11:14 – Scotstoun Stadium
Spain	24
Portugal	14
4 May 2014 – 11:36 – Scotstoun Stadium
France	21
Wales	7

Semi-finals
4 May 2014 – 13:46 – Scotstoun Stadium
United States	14
Japan	19
4 May 2014 – 14:08 – Scotstoun Stadium
Portugal	7
Wales	38

Final
4 May 2014 – 16:52 – Scotstoun Stadium
Japan	12
Wales	29

=== Bowl ===
Quarter-finals
4 May 2014 – 10:30 – Scotstoun Stadium
Samoa	31
United States	12
4 May 2014 – 10:52 – Scotstoun Stadium
Argentina	35
Japan	7
4 May 2014 – 11:14 – Scotstoun Stadium
Spain	24
Portugal	14
4 May 2014 – 11:36 – Scotstoun Stadium
France	21
Wales	7

Semi-finals
4 May 2014 – 14:30 – Scotstoun Stadium
Samoa	12
Argentina	29
4 May 2014 – 14:52 – Scotstoun Stadium
Spain	0
France	24

Final
4 May 2014 – 17:20 – Scotstoun Stadium
Argentina	14
France	20

=== Plate ===
Quarter-finals
4 May 2014 – 11:58 – Scotstoun Stadium
New Zealand	19
Australia	7
4 May 2014 – 12:20 – Scotstoun Stadium
Fiji	14
England	12
4 May 2014 – 12:42 – Scotstoun Stadium
Scotland	12
South Africa	7
4 May 2014 – 13:04 – Scotstoun Stadium
Canada	14
Kenya	5

Semi-finals
4 May 2014 – 15:14 – Scotstoun Stadium
Australia	7
England	21
4 May 2014 – 15:36 – Scotstoun Stadium
South Africa	7
Kenya	14

Final
4 May 2014 – 17:48 – Scotstoun Stadium
England	26
Kenya	5

=== Cup ===
Quarter-finals
4 May 2014 – 11:58 – Scotstoun Stadium
New Zealand	19
Australia	7
4 May 2014 – 12:20 – Scotstoun Stadium
Fiji	14
England	12
4 May 2014 – 12:42 – Scotstoun Stadium
Scotland	12
South Africa	7
4 May 2014 – 13:04 – Scotstoun Stadium
Canada	14
Kenya	5

Semi-finals
4 May 2014 – 15:58 – Scotstoun Stadium
New Zealand	19
Fiji	14
4 May 2014 – 16:20 – Scotstoun Stadium
Scotland	7
Canada	10

Final
4 May 2014 – 18:50 – Scotstoun Stadium
New Zealand	54
Canada	7
Third place
4 May 2014 – 18:16 – Scotstoun Stadium
Fiji	17
Scotland	10
