= Spain national rugby sevens team =

Rugby union team

Spain
- Union: Spanish Rugby Federation
- Coach: Francisco Hernández
- Captain: Pol Pla
- Top scorer: Francisco Hernández (449)
- Most tries: Pol Pla (50)
Team kit	Change kit

Spain's national rugby sevens team is one of 12 core teams participating in all ten tournaments of the World Rugby Sevens Series, having qualified by winning the 2017 Hong Kong Sevens qualifier tournament. Spain participated as a core team in the 2012–13 IRB Sevens World Series, but was relegated the following season.

The team trains together at the country's Olympic training facilities in Madrid, which itself has been a result of the sport entering its first Olympic cycle. Spain won the 2016 Olympic qualifying repechage tournament by beating Samoa 22–19 to qualify for the last available qualifying spot for the 2016 Summer Olympics.

The team also competes annually in Rugby Europe's Sevens Grand Prix Series tournament.

== Tournament history ==
=== Summer Olympic Games ===
Spain's Olympic Games results
Year	Round	Position	Pld	W	L	D
(Brazil) 2016	Placement round	10th	5	1	4	0
(Japan) 2020	did not qualify					
Total	Placement round	1/1	5	1	4	0
Matches
	Pool stage	Spain	0 – 24	South Africa		Loss
	Pool stage	Spain	12 – 26	Australia		Loss
	Pool stage	Spain	5 – 26	France		Loss
	9–12th place playoff semi-final	Spain	14 – 12	Kenya		Win
	9–12th place playoff Ninth place	Spain	14 – 24	United States		Loss

=== Rugby World Cup Sevens ===
Rugby World Cup Sevens Record
Year	Round	Position	Pld	W	L	D
(Scotland) 1993	Plate Finalist	10th	7	3	4	0
(Hong Kong) 1997	Plate Quarterfinalist	13th	5	3	2	0
(Argentina) 2001	Plate Semifinalist	11th	7	4	3	0
(Hong Kong) 2005	Did not qualify					
(United Arab Emirates) 2009	Did not qualify					
(Russia) 2013	Bowl Quarterfinalist	21st	4	0	4	0
(United States) 2018	Did not qualify					
(South Africa) 2022	Did not qualify					
Total	0 Titles	4/7	23	10	13	0

== World Rugby Sevens Series ==
Spain started off the 2012–13 IRB Sevens Series with a bang at the 2012 Gold Coast Sevens, defeating core teams Wales and England to finish ninth and win the Bowl. Pedro Martin led Spain in scoring in the 2012 Gold Coast Sevens, contributing 5 tries and 27 points, while Pablo Feijoo added 4 tries and 22 points.

Spain was elevated to "core team" status for the 2012–13 IRB Sevens World Series, following its performance in qualifying at the 2012 Hong Kong Sevens. At that tournament, Spain defeated Zimbabwe, Philippines, Tonga and Japan to reach the finals, where it lost to Canada. Spain participated in other events during the 2011–12 IRB Sevens World Series. In that season, Spain played in the 2012 Scotland Sevens, reaching the Bowl finals, and the 2012 London Sevens, reaching the Cup quarterfinal.

Spain's best finish on the World Series was the 2024–25 season where Spain finished 3rd.

== Players ==
=== Current squad ===
The following players have been selected to represent Spain during the 2026–27 SVNS tournament beginning in November 2026.

Note: Caps reflect the total number of SVNS events competed in as of the 2026 Dubai Sevens.

Player	Position	Date of birth (age)	Caps	Club/province
Enrique Bolinches (es)	Forward	3 August 2001 (age 25)	?	Inter RC
Asier Pérez Cervilla (es)	Forward	1 February 2004 (age 22)	?	La Vila
Hugo Carriere	Forward	(age 25)	?	Liceo Francés
Manu Moreno	Forward	2 September 1998 (age 28)	?	Unattached
Josep Serres (es)	Forward	4 October 2000 (age 26)	?	Unattached
Pol Pla	Back	18 February 1993 (age 33)	?	Unattached
Martín Sorreluz (es)	Back	30 December 2003 (age 22)	?	Unattached
Alejandro Laforga (es)	Back	29 August 1999 (age 27)	?	Cisneros
Francisco Cosculluela (es)	Back	1 May 2001 (age 25)	?	Industriales
Gabriel Rocaries (es)	Back	3 October 2004 (age 22)	?	Pozuelo
Juan Ramos Martín (es)	Back	11 October 1995 (age 31)	?	El Salvador
Antón Legorburu (es)	Back	7 February 2001 (age 25)	?	Bera Bera
Javier López de Haro (es)	Back	22 May 2004 (age 22)	?	Alcobendas
Telmo Fisher (es)	Back	24 February 2007 (age 19)	?	Espoirs Aviron Bayonnais

=== Award winners ===
The following Spain Sevens players have been recognised at the World Rugby Awards since 2004:

World Rugby Men's 7s Dream Team
Year	No.	Player
2025	3.	Manu Moreno
2025	6.	Pol Pla

== Records and statistics ==
=== Former squads ===
Spain squad for the 2017–18 World Rugby Sevens Series

2017–18 Sevens Series
Player	Age
Alejandro Alonso	19
Francisco Hernández	29
Ignacio Martin Goenaga	34
Ignacio Rodriguez-Guerra	22
Igor Genua (c)	29
Iñaki Villanueva	27
Jacobo Martin Beamonte	24
Jaike Carter	31
Javier Carrión	27
Javier De Juan	27
Josh Taylor	20
Lucas Levy	27
Manuel Sainz-Trapaga	25
Marcos Poggi	30
Pablo Fontes	22
Pol Pla	25
Thomas Pearce	27
Pablo Feijoo (Head Coach)

Spain team to the 2014 London Sevens

Squad to 2014 London Sevens:
Player
Adam Newton
Inaki Villanueva
Javier Carrion
Javier de Juan
Matias Tudela
Jacobo Martin
Jaike Carter
Gauthier Minguillon
Francisco Hernandez
Angel Lopez
Glen Rolls
Pablo Fontes

Spain team to the 2012 Hong Kong Sevens

Squad for 2012 Hong Kong Sevens:
Player	Number
Ignacio Martin	1
Carlos Blanco	2
Javier Canosa	3
Pablo Feijóo (c)	4
César Sempere	5
Martín Heredia	6
Pedro Martín	7
Juan Cano	8
Angel Lopez	9
Matías Tudela	10
Ryan Le Roux	11
Marcus Poggi	12

=== Coach ===
Pablo Feijoo has served as head coach of the Spain national rugby sevens team since the 2016–17 season. He played in the 2013 Rugby World Cup Sevens in Russia, and was a member of the squad that defeated Samoa 7s to secure a place in the 2016 Summer Olympics.

Feijoo replaced Ignacio "Tiki" Inchausti, who played in Spain's only ever appearance at the 1999 fifteens Rugby World Cup, and also played at the Rugby World Cup Sevens in 2001 in Mar del Plata. Prior to his appointment to the men's team, Inchausti was in charge of Spain's women's squad, whom he managed to qualify for the inaugural participation of women in the tournament in Dubai in 2009. Inchausti coached the Spanish men's men's side from 2010, helping them qualify as a core team in 2012.

== Player records ==
Players in bold are still active.

Tries scored
No.	Player	Tries
1	**Pol Pla**	94
2	**Eduardo Lopez**	51
3	Manuel Sainz-Trapaga	40
4	Eduardo Lopez	39
5	**Juan Ramos**	38

== 2008 Hannover Sevens ==
Group A matches

	POR	GEO	ESP	GER	RUS	ROM
Portugal	–	26–10	28–5	14–12	45–5	38–0
Georgia	–	–	28–5	26–0	5–0	12–0
Spain	–	–	–	26–22	7–29	14–0
Germany	–	–	–	–	17–12	24–21
Russia	–	–	–	–	–	19–19
Romania	–	–	–	–	–	–

Team	Pld	W	D	L	PF	PA	±	Pts
Portugal	5	5	0	0	151	32	+119	15
Georgia	5	4	0	1	81	31	+50	13
Spain	5	2	0	3	57	107	−50	9
Germany	5	2	0	3	75	99	−24	9
Russia	5	1	1	3	74	100	−26	8
Romania	5	0	1	4	31	100	−69	6

== See also ==
- Spain women's national rugby sevens team
