= Rugby Europe Under-18 Sevens Championship =

- Most recent season or competition: 2024 Rugby Europe Under-18 Sevens Championship
- Sport: Rugby sevens
- Owner: Rugby Europe
- No. of teams: 12 (2024)
- Continent: Europe
- Most recent champion: France (2024)
- Related competitions: Rugby Europe Sevens

Rugby Europe Under-18 Sevens Championship is Rugby Europe's annual age group rugby sevens tournament for under-18 national sevens teams. The Welsh Under-18 sevens team made their debut at the 2017 tournament in Germany. They met eventual winners, Ireland, in the semifinals.

== Tournament History ==
=== Championship ===
European Under-18 Sevens Championship
Year	Venue	Champions	Runners-up	Third
2016	(Romania) Bucharest	Ireland	France	Portugal
2017	(Germany) Heidelberg	Ireland	France	England
2018	(Lithuania) Panevėžys	France	Ireland	Spain
2019	(Poland) Gdańsk	Ireland	Spain	France
2021	(Poland) Gdańsk	France	Russia	Spain
2022	(Poland) Ząbki	France	Ireland	Portugal
2023	(Switzerland) Macolin	France	Ireland	Portugal
2024	(France) Strasbourg	France	Spain	Ireland

=== Trophy ===
European Under-18 Sevens Trophy
Year	Venue	Champions	Runners-up	Third
2016	(Hungary) Esztergom	Lithuania	Sweden	Switzerland
2019	(Croatia) Zagreb	Czech Republic	Latvia	
2021	(Latvia) Riga	Ukraine	Israel	Latvia
2022	(Latvia) Riga	Switzerland	Turkey	Luxembourg
2023	(Poland) Ząbki	Romania	Latvia	Poland
