= Rugby union in Latvia =

- Country: Latvia
- Governing body: Latvian Rugby Federation
- National team(s): Latvia
- First played: Mid 20th century
- Registered players: 622
- Clubs: 13

National competitions
- Rugby World Cup; Rugby World Cup Sevens; IRB Sevens World Series; European Nations Cup

Rugby union in Latvia is a minor but growing sport. During the occupation of the Baltic states, Latvia was not a centre for the game but nonetheless Latvia managed to qualify for the 1993 Rugby World Cup Sevens - which may be seen as the highest point it has yet reached.

== Governing body ==
The Latvian Rugby Federation (Latvian: Latvijas Regbija federācija) was founded in 1963, and joined the IRB in 1991, after Latvia restored its independence. Although the union was formed in the sixties, it was not considered a proper national union until after the breakup of the USSR, which had occupied Latvia in 1940.

== History ==
=== Soviet period ===
Rugby union arrived in Latvia during the post-WWII Soviet occupation. Latvia was never a stronghold of rugby in the USSR - the game was mainly played in Russia and Georgia - but has experienced some growth after the restoration of independence.

After 1949, rugby's funding was withdrawn in the USSR for the sport being "non-olympic". The competitions were resumed in 1957, and the Soviet Championship in 1966. In 1975 the Soviet national team played their first match.

The Latvian SSR had its own rugby team in the USSR, but it was not treated as a proper national side.

=== Restored independence ===
Like many other minor rugby nations, the game is centered on the capital, Riga.

Latvian rugby received a surprise boost when they qualified for the 1993 Rugby World Cup Sevens. At the time, there were only two pitches in the country, both of which spent much of their time under snow. However, they lost heavily to Fiji, Wales, South Africa and Romania.

There is some rivalry with neighbours Lithuania, who they beat in the qualifiers for the 1995 Rugby World Cup, although they did not succeed in qualifying for the main competition as they lost to Germany.

The Baltic states are not a major rugby playing area at the time of writing, but several neighbouring countries such as Poland, Russia and Sweden can boast thousands of players. The game is also growing fairly fast in Ukraine . Entry into the European Union will also make it easier for western European sides to tour the country.

Snow rugby is also played in Latvia during the winter when conditions make standard play impossible.

== See also ==
- Latvia national rugby union team
- Latvia national rugby union team (sevens)
- Soviet Union national rugby union team
- Rugby league in Latvia
