= Hayden Hyde =

English rugby union player

- Full name: Hayden Hyde
- Born: 15 September 2000 (age 26) Kingston-upon-Thames, England
- Height: 191 cm (6 ft 3 in)
- Weight: 101 kg (223 lb; 15 st 13 lb)
- School: Cranleigh School

Rugby union career
- Position: Centre / Wing
- Current team: Ealing Trailfinders
Youth career
- 2014-2017: KCS Old Boys
- 2017-2019: Harlequins
- 2019-2021: Ulster
Senior career
Years	Team	Apps	(Points)
2019-2020	Ulster 'A'	5	(0)
2021-2026	Harlequins	19	(20)
2021-2026	→ London Scottish (loan)	47	(115)
2026-	Ealing Trailfinders		(0)
- Correct as of 22 July 2026
International career
Years	Team	Apps	(Points)
2017-2018	Ireland U18	5	(20)
2018	Ireland U19	1	(0)
2020	Ireland U20	2	(5)
- Correct as of 1 April 2024
National sevens teams
Years	Team		Comps
2018	Ireland U18		1
2022-	England		5
- Correct as of 1 April 2024
Medal record
Men's Rugby 7's
Representing Ireland
Rugby Europe Under-18 Sevens Championship
Silver medal – second place	2018 Lithuania	Squad

Hayden Hyde (born 15 September 2000) is an English rugby union player who plays as a centre or wing for Ealing Trailfinders in Champ Rugby.

== Club career ==
Hyde got his first taste of competitive club rugby as part of a highly successful age-group side at KCS Old Boys juniors playing alongside a number of other talented Harlequins Academy, London Irish Academy and Wasps Academy players. After finishing his education at Cranleigh School Hyde moved to Ulster. Playing for Ulster 'A' in the Celtic Cup, including featuring in the final against Leinster 'A'.

He rejoined Harlequins in 2021 going on to make his debut in the first round of the 2021-22 Premiership Rugby Cup against Saracens coming off the bench in a 28–21 loss. He went on to make his Gallagher Premiership debut for Harlequins against Saracens on 17 September 2022. He signed a new deal with Harlequins in February 2023. His first Premiership try for Harlequins came on 25 April 2026 as he crossed in a high-scoring encounter at the Stoop against Sale.

Hayden featured extensively on loan for London Scottish in the RFU Championship making 47 appearances over several years and scoring 23 tries for the Exiles.

In Summer 2026 it was announced Hyde would depart Harlequins and in July Ealing Trailfinders confirmed he would be joining them ahead of the 2026-27 Champ Rugby season.

== International career ==
He qualifies for Ireland through his mother, who was born in Tallaght. His international debut came in 2017 when he was called up to the Ireland U18 squad for a friendly against Portugal U18. Hyde opening the scoring for the Irish side, with a try in the 9th minute in the 27–46 win. In 2018 he started at centre in a 56–17 win over Canada U18 where he scored two tries. He featured for the Ireland U18 side 5 times in total.

He was named in the Irish squad for the 2018 Rugby Europe Under-18 Sevens Championship. With Ireland coming runners up, losing to France in the final. He featured once for Ireland U19 in a friendly against Australia Schools. While he was with Ireland U19 he was invited to join the England squad however he declined.

He was named in the Ireland under-20 squad for the 2020 Six Nations Under 20s Championship, featuring twice, starting at inside centre against Scotland U20 and England U20.

In 2021 he joined England Sevens and made his debut the following year at the Malaga leg of the World Sevens, and was later named in the England squad for the 2022 Commonwealth Games.
