= 2015 Rugby Europe Sevens Olympic Repechage Tournament =

- Hosts: Portugal
- Date: 18–19 July
- Nations: 12

Final positions
- Champions: Russia
- Runners-up: Germany
- Third: Ireland

The 2015 Rugby Europe Sevens Olympic Repechage Tournament was held on 18–19 July in Lisbon to determine the three teams that joined Spain at the final Olympic qualifying tournament, made up of the eight non-qualified Grand Prix teams, the top three teams of Division A and the champion of Division B. Russia won the European tournament, and qualified for the 2016 Final Olympic Qualification Tournament along with runner-up Germany and third place Ireland.

== Teams ==
- Russia (Grand Prix 4th)
- Germany (Grand Prix 5th)
- Portugal (Grand Prix 6th)
- Belgium (Grand Prix 8th)
- Lithuania (Grand Prix 9th)
- Georgia (Grand Prix 10th)
- Italy (Grand Prix 11th)
- Romania (Grand Prix 12th)
- Poland (Division A winner)
- Ukraine (Division A 2nd)
- Latvia (Division A 3rd)
- Ireland (Division B winner)

== Standings ==
Legend
Qualified for the Final 2016 Men's Olympic Qualification Tournament.

Rank	Team	Record	Pts Diff	Pool
1st place, gold medalist(s)	Russia	4–1–1	+85	A
2nd place, silver medalist(s)	Germany	5–1	+116	B
3rd place, bronze medalist(s)	Ireland	4–1–1	+33	A
4	Georgia	3–3	–9	A
5	Romania	3–3	–44	B
6	Lithuania	3–3	–33	B
7	Belgium	3–3	0	C
8	Portugal	3–3	+58	C
9	Italy	2–3	–31	A
10	Ukraine	2–3	–55	C
11	Poland	1–4	–62	C
12	Latvia	0–5	–61	B

== Pool stage ==
Key to colours in group tables
Teams that advanced to the Cup Quarterfinal

=== Pool A ===
Teams	Pld	W	D	L	PF	PA	+/−	Pts
Ireland	3	2	1	0	73	53	+20	8
Georgia	3	2	0	1	39	35	+4	7
Russia	3	1	1	1	57	36	+21	6
Italy	3	0	0	3	31	76	–45	3

18 July 2015

Russia	19–19	Ireland
	Report

Lisbon

18 July 2015

Georgia	12–7	Italy
	Report

Lisbon

18 July 2015

Russia	31–7	Italy
	Report

Lisbon

18 July 2015
15.06

Georgia	17–21	Ireland
	Report

Lisbon

18 July 2015
17.00

Italy	17–33	Ireland
	Report

Lisbon

18 July 2015

Russia	7–10	Georgia
	Report

Lisbon

=== Pool B ===
Teams	Pld	W	D	L	PF	PA	+/−	Pts
Germany	3	3	0	0	112	12	+100	9
Lithuania	3	2	0	1	57	60	–3	7
Romania	3	1	0	2	24	74	–50	5
Latvia	3	0	0	3	22	69	–47	3

18 July 2015

Germany	31–5	Latvia
	Report

Lisbon

18 July 2015

Lithuania	29–7	Romania
	Report

Lisbon

18 July 2015

Germany	45–0	Romania
	Report

Lisbon

18 July 2015

Lithuania	21–17	Latvia
	Report

Lisbon

18 July 2015

Romania	17–0	Latvia
	Report

Lisbon

18 July 2015

Germany	36–7	Lithuania
	Report

Lisbon

=== Pool C ===
Teams	Pld	W	D	L	PF	PA	+/−	Pts
Portugal	3	3	0	0	116	21	+95	9
Belgium	3	2	0	1	71	49	+22	7
Ukraine	3	1	0	2	33	88	–55	5
Poland	3	0	0	3	24	86	–62	3

18 July 2015

Portugal	40–14	Ukraine
	Report

Lisbon

18 July 2015

Belgium	33–7	Poland
	Report

Lisbon

18 July 2015

Portugal	41–7	Poland
	Report

Lisbon

18 July 2015

Belgium	38–7	Ukraine
	Report

Lisbon

18 July 2015

Poland	10–12	Ukraine
	Report

Lisbon

18 July 2015

Portugal	35–0	Belgium
	Report

Lisbon

== Knockout stage ==
=== Bowl ===
Semi-finals
19 July 2015 – 12:28 – Lisbon
Ukraine	21
Poland	14
19 July 2015 – 12:50 – Lisbon
Italy	12
Latvia	5

Final
19 July 2015 – 16:02 – Lisbon
Ukraine	12
Italy	19
Third place
19 July 2015 – 15:40 – Lisbon
Poland	19
Latvia	12

=== Plate ===
Quarter-finals
19 July 2015 – 11:00 – Lisbon
Germany	26
Romania	5
19 July 2015 – 12:06 – Lisbon
Belgium	5
Georgia	21
19 July 2015 – 11:22 – Lisbon
Portugal	0
Russia	24
19 July 2015 – 11:44 – Lisbon
Ireland	17
Lithuania	0

Semi-finals
19 July 2015 – 14:12 – Lisbon
Romania	24
Belgium	19
19 July 2015 – 14:34 – Lisbon
Portugal	12
Lithuania	21

Final
19 July 2015 – 17:16 – Lisbon
Romania	22
Lithuania	0
Third place
19 July 2015 – 16:54 – Lisbon
Belgium	26
Portugal	22

=== Cup ===
Quarter-finals
19 July 2015 – 11:00 – Lisbon
Germany	26
Romania	5
19 July 2015 – 12:06 – Lisbon
Belgium	5
Georgia	21
19 July 2015 – 11:22 – Lisbon
Portugal	0
Russia	24
19 July 2015 – 11:44 – Lisbon
Ireland	17
Lithuania	0

Semi-finals
19 July 2015 – 14:56 – Lisbon
Germany	26
Georgia	5
19 July 2015 – 15:18 – Lisbon
Russia	24
Ireland	10

Final
19 July 2015 – 18:10 – Lisbon
Germany	12
Russia	38
Third place
19 July 2015 – 17:43 – Lisbon
Georgia	7
Ireland	15

== See also ==
- 2015 Rugby Europe Women's Sevens Olympic Repechage Tournament
