= Ionuț Balaban =

Romania international rugby union player

- Full name: Ionuț Balaban
- Born: 23 May 1996 (age 30) Bârlad, Romania
- Height: 1.82 m (5 ft 11 1/2 in)
- Weight: 89 kg (14 st 0 lb; 196 lb)

Rugby union career
- Position: Centre
- Current team: Sporting Club Appaméen
Youth career
- 2010–2014: CSS Bârlad
- 2014–2016: CNOT Steaua
Amateur team(s)
| Years | Team | Apps | (Points) |
- RC Bârlad
Senior career
| Years | Team | Apps | (Points) |
| 2016–2018 | Dinamo București | 18 | (10) |
| 2018–2020 | Știința Baia Mare | 8 | (5) |
| 2020–2020 | Gloria Buzău | 0 | (0) |
| 2020-2021 | SCM Timisoara | | |
| 2021-present | Sporting Club Appaméen | | |
- Correct as of 13 January 2019
International career
| Years | Team | Apps | (Points) |
- Romania U-20
- Romania 7's
| 2016–Present | Romania | 1 | (0) |
- Correct as of 13 January 2019

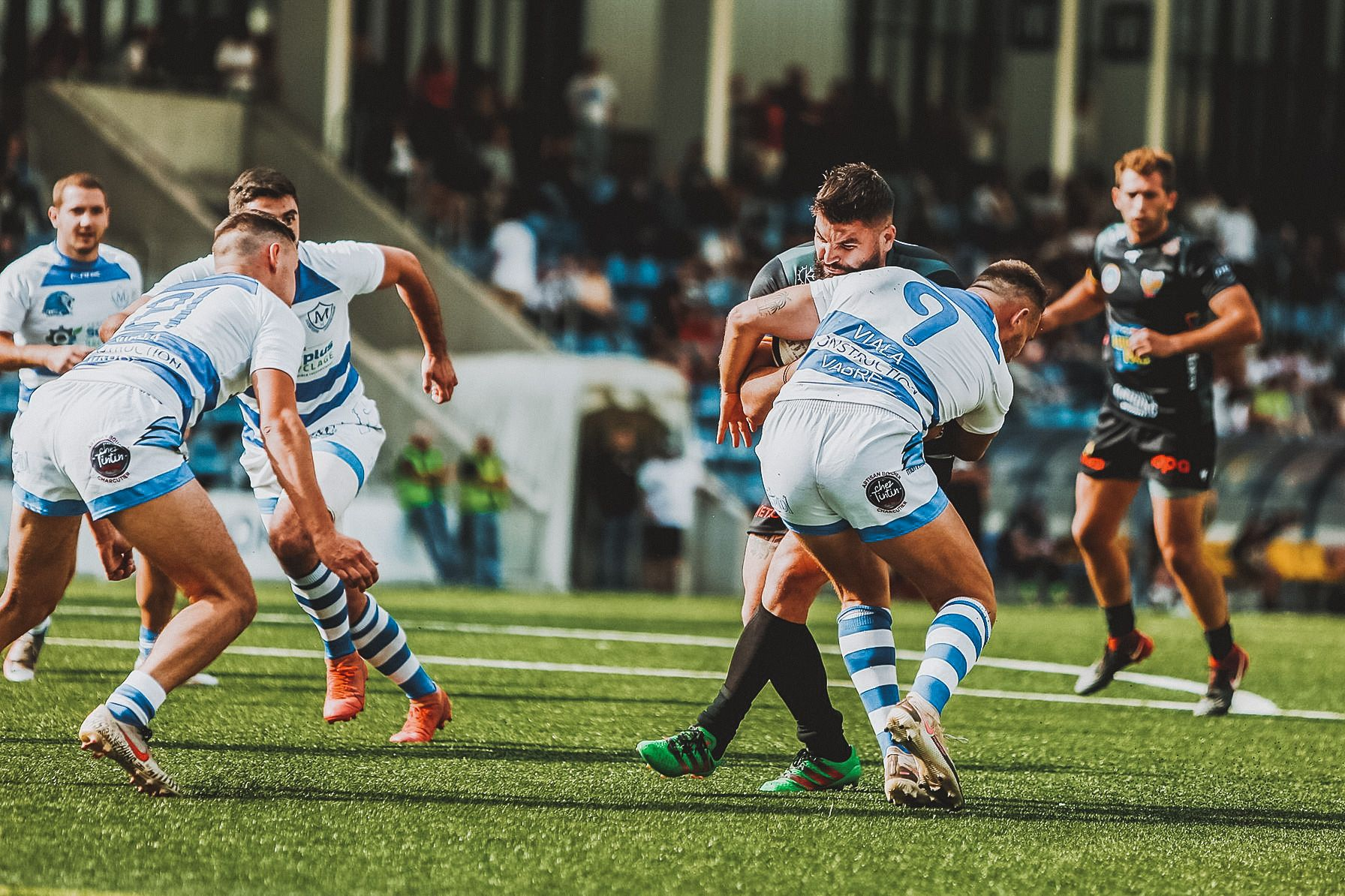

Ionuț Balaban (born 23 May 1996) is a Romanian rugby union football player. He plays as a centre for professional Fédérale 1 club Sporting Club Appaméen.

== Club career ==
Ionuț Balaban started playing rugby in 2010 at CSS Bârlad, a school-based club under the guidance of coaches Ciprian Popa and Ioan Harnagea. He was selected for the senior team of the club making his debut in Divizia Națională, the second tier of the Romanian rugby league system. After some impressive performances, he was signed at the beginning of 2016 by Dinamo București. After two seasons with the Bucharest team, he transferred to Știința Baia Mare. In January 2020 he was signed by SuperLiga side Gloria Buzău.In July 2020 he was signed by SuperLiga team SCM Timișoara

== International career ==
Balaban also played for the Romania national under-20 rugby union team and Romania national rugby sevens team. Balaban is also selected for Romania's national team, the Oaks, making his international debut at the 2016 World Rugby Nations Cup in a match against the Welwitschias.He was the youngest rugby player in Romania to be selected for Romanian's national team, the Oaks
