= 2015 Rugby Europe Sevens Grand Prix Series =

- Hosts: Russia; France; England
- Date: 6 June – 12 July
- Nations: 12

Final positions
- Champions: France
- Runners-up: Spain
- Third: England

Series details
- Matches played: 102
- Tries scored: 525 (average 5.147 per match)
- Top try scorer: (France) Julien Candelon (17) (Russia) Denis Simplikevich (17)
- Top point scorer: (France) Terry Bouhraoua (184)

The 2015 Rugby Europe Sevens Grand Prix Series was an Olympic qualification tournament for rugby sevens at the 2016 Summer Olympics which was held over three legs in the cities of Moscow, Lyon and Exeter.

The top team qualified directly to the Olympic Games, whereas the runner-up qualified to the Final Olympic Qualification Tournament in 2016. France won the 2015 Rugby Europe Men's Sevens Championship, and qualified directly to the 2016 Summer Olympics. Spain finished second and qualified directly to the Final 2016 Men's Olympic Qualification Tournament, avoiding the Rugby Europe Repechage Tournament.

This was the final time that the Rugby Europe Grand Prix Series acted as an olympic qualifying tournament. Qualification for the 2020 Summer Olympics consisted of a separate Stand-alone Olympic Qualifying tournament organised by Rugby Europe. Rugby sevens at the 2023 European Games acted as the 2024 Olympic Qualifying tournament following Rugby Sevens debut within the European Games.

== Schedule ==
Date	Venue	Winner	Runner-up	Third
6–7 June	(Russia) Moscow	France	Russia	Spain
13–14 June	(France) Lyon	France	Spain	Belgium
11–12 July	(England) Exeter	France	England	Spain

== Standings ==
Legend
Qualified for the 2016 Summer Olympics.
Qualified for the Final Olympic Qualification Tournament.
Qualified for the Rugby Europe Repechage Tournament
Qualified for the Repechage Tournament and relegated to Division A for 2016.
Ineligible for Olympic Qualification – Already Qualified for Olympics

Rank	Team	Moscow	Lyon	Exeter	Points
1st place, gold medalist(s)	France	20	20	20	60
2nd place, silver medalist(s)	Spain	16	18	16	50
3rd place, bronze medalist(s)	England	14	12	18	44
4	Russia	18	10	10	38
5	Germany	10	14	14	38
6	Portugal	12	8	4	24
7	Wales	8	2	12	22
8	Belgium	3	16	1	20
9	Lithuania	6	3	8	17
10	Georgia	4	4	6	14
11	Italy	2	6	3	11
12	Romania	1	1	2	4

Note Russia finishes above Germany due to tiebreaker of highest single tournament finish.

== Moscow ==
Event	Winners	Score	Finalists	Semifinalists
Cup	France	40–17	Russia	Spain (Third); England
Plate	Portugal	35–7	Germany	Wales (Seventh); Lithuania
Bowl	Georgia	14–12	Belgium	Italy (Eleventh); Romania

== Lyon ==
Event	Winners	Score	Finalists	Semifinalists
Cup	France	20–7	Spain	Belgium (Third); Germany
Plate	England	26–14	Russia	Portugal (Seventh); Italy
Bowl	Georgia	20–17	Lithuania	Wales (Eleventh); Romania

== Exeter ==
Event	Winners	Score	Finalists	Semifinalists
Cup	France	14–5	England	Spain (Third); Germany
Plate	Wales	14–10	Russia	Lithuania (Seventh); Georgia
Bowl	Portugal	26–12	Italy	Romania (Eleventh); Belgium

== See also ==
- 2015 Rugby Europe Women's Sevens Grand Prix Series
