= 2015 Rugby Europe Sevens – Division A =

- Hosts: Hungary; Poland
- Date: 6–21 June 2015
- Nations: 10

Final positions
- Champions: Poland
- Runners-up: Ukraine
- Third: Latvia

The 2015 Rugby Europe Sevens Division A tournament is the second division of Rugby Europe's 2015 sevens season. This edition was hosted by the cities of Esztergom and Gdańsk from 6–21 June, with the winner promoted to the 2016 Grand Prix and the two teams with the fewest points relegated to Conference 1. Teams finishing in the top three also advanced to a repechage tournament for qualification to the final Olympic qualification tournament.

== Standings ==
Legend
Qualified for the repechage tournament
and promoted to the 2016 Grand Prix Series.
Qualified for the repechage tournament.
Relegated to Division B for 2016.

Rank	Team	Esztergom	Gdańsk	Points
1st place, gold medalist(s)	Poland	20	20	40
2nd place, silver medalist(s)	Ukraine	18	16	34
3rd place, bronze medalist(s)	Latvia	14	14	28
4	Moldova	12	10	22
5	Israel	10	12	22
6	Cyprus	3	18	21
7	Czech Republic	16	4	20
8	Denmark	8	6	14
8	Sweden	6	8	14
10	Hungary	4	3	7

Note Tiebreaker for Sweden and Denmark for Relegation TBD

== Esztergom ==
=== Pool stage ===
Key to colours in group tables
Teams that advance to Cup Semifinal
Teams that advance to Plate Semifinal

==== Pool A ====
Teams	Pld	W	D	L	PF	PA	+/−	Pts
Ukraine	4	3	0	1	119	22	+97	10
Poland	4	3	0	1	114	40	+74	10
Israel	4	3	0	1	89	24	+65	10
Moldova	4	1	0	3	33	129	–96	6
Hungary	4	0	0	4	7	147	–140	4

6 June 2015
10:00

Hungary	0–45	Poland
	Report

Esztergom

6 June 2015
10:44

Ukraine	10–5	Israel
	Report

Esztergom

6 June 2015
11:28

Poland	38–7	Moldova
	Report

Esztergom

6 June 2015
12:12

Ukraine	38–0	Hungary
	Report

Esztergom

6 June 2015

Israel	27–0	Moldova
	Report

Esztergom

6 June 2015
15:30

Poland	17–14	Ukraine
	Report

Esztergom

6 June 2015
16:14

Israel	38–0	Hungary
	Report

Esztergom

6 June 2015
16:58

Ukraine	57–0	Moldova
	Report

Esztergom

6 June 2015
17:42

Poland	14–19	Israel
	Report

Esztergom

6 June 2015
18:26

Moldova	26–7	Hungary
	Report

Esztergom

==== Pool B ====
Teams	Pld	W	D	L	PF	PA	+/−	Pts
Czech Republic	4	4	0	0	111	55	+56	12
Latvia	4	3	0	1	96	47	+49	10
Denmark	4	2	0	2	88	85	+3	8
Sweden	4	1	0	3	52	62	–10	6
Cyprus	4	0	0	4	19	117	–98	4

6 June 2015
10:22

Czech Republic	33–7	Cyprus
	Report

Esztergom

6 June 2015
11:06

Sweden	5–14	Latvia
	Report

Esztergom

6 June 2015
11:50

Cyprus	12–26	Denmark
	Report

Esztergom

6 June 2015
12:34

Sweden	17–19	Czech Republic
	Report

Esztergom

6 June 2015
13:18

Latvia	27–14	Denmark
	Report

Esztergom

6 June 2015
15:52

Cyprus	0–15	Sweden
	Report

Esztergom

6 June 2015
16:36

Latvia	12–28	Czech Republic
	Report

Esztergom

6 June 2015
17:20

Sweden	15–29	Denmark
	Report

Esztergom

6 June 2015
18:04

Cyprus	0–43	Latvia
	Report

Esztergom

6 June 2015
18:48

Denmark	19–31	Czech Republic
	Report

Esztergom

=== Knockout stage ===
==== Bowl ====
Final
7 June 2015 – 13:42 – Esztergom
Hungary	14
Cyprus	10

==== Plate ====
Semi-finals
7 June 2015 – 11:00 – Esztergom
Israel	22
Sweden	0
7 June 2015 – 11:22 – Esztergom
Moldova	28
Denmark	26

Final
7 June 2015 – 14:36 – Esztergom
Israel	19
Moldova	21
Third place
7 June 2015 – 14:09 – Esztergom
Sweden	0
Denmark	33

==== Cup ====
Semi-finals
7 June 2015 – 11:44 – Esztergom
Ukraine	12
Latvia	0
7 June 2015 – 12:06 – Esztergom
Poland	36
Czech Republic	0

Final
7 June 2015 – 15:30 – Esztergom
Ukraine	10
Poland	14
Third place
7 June 2015 – 15:03 – Esztergom
Latvia	5
Czech Republic	17

== Gdańsk ==
=== Pool stage ===
Key to colours in group tables
Teams that advance to Cup Semifinal
Teams that advance to Plate Semifinal

==== Pool A ====
Teams	Pld	W	D	L	PF	PA	+/−	Pts
Poland	4	4	0	0	131	24	+107	12
Latvia	4	3	0	1	84	40	+49	10
Moldova	4	2	0	2	73	61	+12	8
Sweden	4	1	0	3	57	81	–24	6
Hungary	4	0	0	4	17	156	–139	4

20 June 2015
10:00

Poland	50–0	Hungary
	Report

Gdańsk

20 June 2015
10:44

Latvia	29–0	Moldova
	Report

Gdańsk

20 June 2015
11:28

Poland	31–0	Sweden
	Report

Gdańsk

20 June 2015
12:12

Latvia	33–0	Hungary
	Report

Gdańsk

20 June 2015
12:56

Moldova	26–10	Sweden
	Report

Gdańsk

20 June 2015
15:30

Poland	33–10	Latvia
	Report

Gdańsk

20 June 2015
16:14

Moldova	33–5	Hungary
	Report

Gdańsk

20 June 2015
16:58

Latvia	12–7	Sweden
	Report

Gdańsk

20 June 2015
17:42

Poland	17–14	Moldova
	Report

Gdańsk

20 June 2015
18:26

Sweden	40–12	Hungary
	Report

Gdańsk

==== Pool B ====
Teams	Pld	W	D	L	PF	PA	+/−	Pts
Cyprus	4	3	0	1	93	40	+50	10
Ukraine	4	3	0	1	72	22	+50	10
Israel	4	3	0	1	70	33	+37	10
Denmark	4	1	0	3	41	93	–52	6
Czech Republic	4	0	0	4	28	101	–73	4

20 June 2015
10:22

Cyprus	5–0	Ukraine
	Report

Gdańsk

20 June 2015
11:06

Czech Republic	7–17	Israel
	Report

Gdańsk

20 June 2015
11:50

Ukraine	17–10	Denmark
	Report

Gdańsk

20 June 2015
12:34

Czech Republic	14–29	Cyprus
	Report

Gdańsk

20 June 2015
13:18

Israel	29–7	Denmark
	Report

Gdańsk

20 June 2015
15:52

Ukraine	36–0	Czech Republic
	Report

Gdańsk

20 June 2015
16:36

Israel	24–19	Cyprus
	Report

Gdańsk

20 June 2015
17:20

Czech Republic	7–19	Denmark
	Report

Gdańsk

20 June 2015
18:04

Ukraine	19–7	Israel
	Report

Gdańsk

20 June 2015
18:48

Denmark	5–40	Cyprus
	Report

Gdańsk

=== Knockout stage ===
==== Bowl ====
Final
21 June 2015 – TBD – Gdańsk
Czech Republic	38
Hungary	0

==== Plate ====
Semi-finals
21 June 2015 – TBD – Gdańsk
Moldova	12
Denmark	10
21 June 2015 – TBD – Gdańsk
Israel	17
Sweden	12

Final
21 June 2015 – TBD – Gdańsk
Moldova	7
Israel	29
Third place
21 June 2015 – TBD – Gdańsk
Denmark	14
Sweden	19

==== Cup ====
Semi-finals
21 June 2015 – TBD – Gdańsk
Poland	20
Ukraine	0
21 June 2015 – TBD – Gdańsk
Cyprus	29
Latvia	0

Final
21 June 2015 – TBD – Gdańsk
Poland	34
Cyprus	19
Third place
21 June 2015 – TBD – Gdańsk
Ukraine	36
Latvia	0
