= 2015 Moscow Sevens =

Rugby tournament in Russia

- Sevens Grand Prix Series V
- Host nation: Russia
- Date: 5–6 June 2015

Cup
- Champion: France
- Runner-up: Russia
- Third: Spain

Plate
- Winner: Portugal
- Runner-up: Germany

Bowl
- Winner: Georgia
- Runner-up: Belgium

The 2015 Moscow Sevens was the opening tournament of the 2015 Sevens Grand Prix Series. It was held over the weekend of 6–7 June 2015.

The France rugby team defeated Russia in the final and became the champion of this series.

== Teams ==
The 12 participating teams for the tournament:

- Belgium
- England (Note: England and Wales have already qualified for the 2016 Olympic tournament as the combined Great Britain team.)
- France
- Georgia
- Germany
- Italy
- Lithuania
- Romania
- Portugal
- Russia
- Spain
- Wales

== Pool Stage ==
Key to colours in group tables
Teams that advanced to the Cup Quarterfinal

=== Pool A ===
Teams	Pld	W	D	L	PF	PA	+/−	Pts
France	3	3	0	0	129	0	+129	9
Wales	3	2	0	1	43	70	–27	7
Georgia	3	1	0	2	31	82	–51	5
Romania	3	0	0	3	35	86	–51	3

6 June 2015
10:00

France	38–0	Romania
	Report

Moscow

6 June 2015
11:06

Wales	19–7	Georgia
	Report

Moscow

6 June 2015
13:00

France	49–0	Georgia
	Report

Moscow

6 June 2015
14:06

Wales	24–21	Romania
	Report

Moscow

6 June 2015
16:00

Georgia	24–14	Romania
	Report

Moscow

6 June 2015
17:06

France	42–0	Wales
	Report

Moscow

=== Pool B ===
Teams	Pld	W	D	L	PF	PA	+/−	Pts
Portugal	3	3	0	0	93	43	+50	9
England	3	2	0	1	75	53	+22	7
Lithuania	3	1	0	2	50	78	–28	5
Belgium	3	0	0	3	41	85	–44	3

6 June 2015
10:22

England	28–17	Lithuania
	Report

Moscow

6 June 2015
11:28

Belgium	10–38	Portugal
	Report

Moscow

6 June 2015
13:22

England	21 - 24	Portugal
	Report

Moscow

6 June 2015
14:28

Belgium	19–21	Lithuania
	Report

Moscow

6 June 2015
16:22

Portugal	31–12	Lithuania
	Report

Moscow

6 June 2015
17:28

England	26–12	Belgium
	Report

Moscow

=== Pool C ===
Teams	Pld	W	D	L	PF	PA	+/−	Pts
Russia	3	3	0	0	74	38	+36	9
Germany	3	2	0	1	48	38	+10	7
Spain	3	1	0	2	40	36	+4	5
Italy	3	0	0	3	26	76	-50	3

6 June 2015
11:44

Russia	24–21	Italy
	Report

Moscow

6 June 2015
11:50

Spain	7–12	Germany
	Report

Moscow

6 June 2015
13:44

Russia	26–12	Germany
	Report

Moscow

6 June 2015
14:50

Spain	28–0	Italy
	Report

Moscow

6 June 2015
16:44

Germany	24–5	Italy
	Report

Moscow

6 June 2015
17:50

Russia	24–5	Spain
	Report

Moscow

== Knockout stage ==
=== Bowl ===
Semi-finals
7 June 2015 – 11:28 – Moscow
Georgia	15
Romania	7
7 June 2015 – 11:50 – Moscow
Belgium	26
Italy	12

Final
7 June 2015 – 15:02 – Moscow
Georgia	14
Belgium	12
Third place
7 June 2015 – 14:40 – Moscow
Romania	14
Italy	21

=== Plate ===
Quarter-finals

Semi-finals

Final

7 June 2015 – 10:28 – Moscow

France
40

7 June 2015 – 13:12 – Moscow

Lithuania
0

Lithuania
5

7 June 2015 – 10:00 – Moscow

Germany
21

England
29

7 June 2015 – 16:16 – Moscow

Germany
12

Germany
7

7 June 2015 – 10:22 – Moscow

Portugal
35

Portugal
14

7 June 2015 – 13:34 – Moscow

Spain
15

Portugal
42

7 June 2015 – 10:44 – Moscow

Wales
7

Third place

Russia
29

7 June 2015 – 15:54 – Moscow

Wales
12

Lithuania
21

Wales
26

=== Cup ===
Quarter-finals

Semi-finals

Final

7 June 2015 – 10:28 – Moscow

France
40

7 June 2015 – 13:56 – Moscow

Lithuania
0

France
22

7 June 2015 – 10:00 – Moscow

England
0

England
29

7 June 2015 – 17:05 – Moscow

Germany
12

France
40

7 June 2015 – 10:22 – Moscow

Russia
17

Portugal
14

7 June 2015 – 14:18 – Moscow

Spain
15

Spain
12

7 June 2015 – 10:44 – Moscow

Russia
19

Third place

Russia
29

7 June 2015 – 16:43 – Moscow

Wales
12

England
7

Spain
19
