= 2015 Lyon Sevens =

- Sevens Grand Prix Series V
- Host nation: France
- Date: 13–14 June 2015

Cup
- Champion: France
- Runner-up: Spain
- Third: Belgium

Plate
- Winner: England
- Runner-up: Russia

Bowl
- Winner: Georgia
- Runner-up: Lithuania

Tournament details
- Matches played: 34

The 2015 Lyon Sevens was the second tournament of the 2015 Rugby Europe Sevens Grand Prix Series. It was held over the weekend of 13–14 June 2015.

== Teams ==
The 12 participating teams for the tournament:

- Belgium
- England (Note: England and Wales have already qualified for the 2016 Olympic tournament as the combined Great Britain team.)
- France
- Georgia
- Germany
- Italy
- Lithuania
- Romania
- Portugal
- Russia
- Spain
- Wales

== Pool Stage ==
Key to colours in group tables
Teams that advanced to the Cup Quarterfinal

=== Pool A ===
Teams	Pld	W	D	L	PF	PA	+/−	Pts
France	3	3	0	0	77	17	+60	9
Italy	3	2	0	1	36	30	+6	7
Portugal	3	1	0	2	48	41	+7	5
Georgia	3	0	0	3	10	83	-73	3

13 June 2015
10:00

France	20–0	Italy
	Report

Lyon

13 June 2015
11:06

Portugal	26–5	Georgia
	Report

Lyon

13 June 2015
13:00

France	38–5	Georgia
	Report

Lyon

13 June 2015
14:06

Portugal	10–17	Italy
	Report

Lyon

13 June 2015
16:00

Georgia	0–19	Italy
	Report

Lyon

13 June 2015
17:06

France	19–12	Portugal
	Report

Lyon

=== Pool B ===
Teams	Pld	W	D	L	PF	PA	+/−	Pts
Belgium	3	2	1	0	83	52	+31	8
Russia	3	2	0	1	98	45	+53	7
England	3	1	1	1	57	48	+9	6
Wales	3	0	0	3	19	112	-93	3

13 June 2015
10:22

Russia	19–24	Belgium
	Report

Lyon

13 June 2015
11:28

England	17–5	Wales
	Report

Lyon

13 June 2015
13:22

Russia	55–0	Wales
	Report

Lyon

13 June 2015
14:28

England	19–19	Belgium
	Report

Lyon

13 June 2015
16:22

Wales	14–40	Belgium
	Report

Lyon

13 June 2015
17:28

Russia	24–21	England
	Report

Lyon

=== Pool C ===
Teams	Pld	W	D	L	PF	PA	+/−	Pts
Spain	3	3	0	0	78	19	+59	9
Germany	3	2	0	1	63	48	+15	7
Lithuania	3	1	0	2	48	80	–32	5
Romania	3	0	0	3	36	78	–42	3

13 June 2015
10:44

Spain	19–5	Romania
	Report

Lyon

13 June 2015
11:50

Germany	28–10	Lithuania
	Report

Lyon

13 June 2015
13:44

Spain	33–7	Lithuania
	Report

Lyon

13 June 2015
14:50

Germany	28–12	Romania
	Report

Lyon

13 June 2015
16:44

Lithuania	31–19	Romania
	Report

Lyon

13 June 2015
17:50

Spain	26–7	Germany
	Report

Lyon

== Knockout stage ==
=== Bowl ===
Semi-finals
14 June 2015 – TBA – Lyon
Lithuania	31
Wales	5
14 June 2015 – TBA – Lyon
Romania	7
Georgia	12

Final
14 June 2015 – TBA – Lyon
Lithuania	17
Georgia	20
Third place
14 June 2015 – TBA – Lyon
Wales	20
Romania	10

=== Plate ===
Quarter-finals
14 June 2015 – TBA – Lyon
France	40
Portugal	7
14 June 2015 – TBA – Lyon
Russia	10
Germany	17
14 June 2015 – TBA – Lyon
Spain	26
England	5
14 June 2015 – TBA – Lyon
Belgium	12
Italy	0

Semi-finals
14 June 2015 – TBA – Lyon
Portugal	10
Russia	17
14 June 2015 – TBA – Lyon
England	26
Italy	0

Final
14 June 2015 – TBA – Lyon
Russia	14
England	26
Third place
14 June 2015 – TBA – Lyon
Portugal	21
Italy	5

=== Cup ===
Quarter-finals
14 June 2015 – TBA – Lyon
France	40
Portugal	7
14 June 2015 – TBA – Lyon
Russia	10
Germany	17
14 June 2015 – TBA – Lyon
Spain	26
England	5
14 June 2015 – TBA – Lyon
Belgium	12
Italy	0

Semi-finals
14 June 2015 – TBA – Lyon
France	28
Germany	14
14 June 2015 – TBA – Lyon
Spain	24
Belgium	5

Final
14 June 2015 – TBA – Lyon
France	20
Spain	7
Third place
14 June 2015 – TBA – Lyon
Germany	21
Belgium	26
