= 2023 Rugby Europe Women's Sevens Conference =

- Hosts: Serbia
- Date: 9–10 June 2023
- Nations: 9

Final positions
- Champions: Switzerland
- Runners-up: Andorra
- Third: Slovakia

Series details
- Matches played: 26

The 2023 Rugby Europe Women's Sevens Conference was held in Belgrade from 9 to 10 June 2023. The tournament consisted of two pool phases in the group stage with three pools of three and a knockout stage that was played for placement.

Switzerland won the tournament and together with runners-up, Andorra, were promoted to next year's Trophy division.

== Participating nations ==
- Andorra
- Croatia
- Estonia
- Lithuania
- Luxembourg
- Malta
- Montenegro
- Slovakia
- Switzerland

== Group Stage ==
=== Pool Phase 1 ===
All times in Central European Summer Time (UTC+02:00)

==== Pool A ====
Team	Pld	W	D	L	PD	Pts
Andorra	2	2	0	0	+37	6
Malta	2	1	0	1	–5	4
Luxembourg	2	0	0	2	–33	2

9 June 2023	Luxembourg	7–17	Malta	King Peter 1 Stadium
10:00 AM				Referee: Laura Wunsch (AUT)

9 June 2023	Andorra	22–7	Malta	King Peter 1 Stadium
12:30 PM				Referee: Clémence Fayard (FRA)

9 June 2023	Luxembourg	0–22	Andorra	King Peter 1 Stadium
15:00 PM				Referee: Cara Senneka (GER)

==== Pool B ====
Team	Pld	W	D	L	PD	Pts
Switzerland	2	2	0	0	+28	6
Lithuania	2	1	0	1	+9	4
Montenegro	2	0	0	2	–37	2

9 June 2023	Switzerland	21–5	Montenegro	King Peter 1 Stadium
10:22 AM				Referee: Cara Senneka (GER)

9 June 2023	Lithuania	31–10	Montenegro	King Peter 1 Stadium
12:52 PM				Referee: Lola Ramirez (FRA)

9 June 2023	Switzerland	17–15	Lithuania	King Peter 1 Stadium
15:22 PM				Referee: Sandra Lihovida (LAT)

==== Pool C ====
Team	Pld	W	D	L	PD	Pts
Slovakia	2	2	0	0	+46	6
Croatia	2	1	0	1	+22	4
Estonia	2	0	0	2	–68	2

9 June 2023	Croatia	41–7	Estonia	King Peter 1 Stadium
10:44 AM				Referee: Sandra Lihovida (LAT)

9 June 2023	Slovakia	41–7	Estonia	King Peter 1 Stadium
13:14 PM				Referee: Laura Wunsch (AUT)

9 June 2023	Croatia	0–12	Slovakia	King Peter 1 Stadium
15:44 PM				Referee: Clémence Fayard (FRA)

=== Pool Phase 2 ===
==== Pool D ====
Team	Pld	W	D	L	PD	Pts
Andorra	2	1	0	1	+34	4
Croatia	2	1	0	2	–12	4
Montenegro	2	1	0	1	–22	4

9 June 2023	Andorra	17–19	Montenegro	King Peter 1 Stadium
17:22 PM				Referee: Laura Wunsch (AUT)

9 June 2023	Croatia	29–5	Montenegro	King Peter 1 Stadium
19:30 PM				Referee: Sandra Lihovida (LAT)

10 June 2023	Andorra	36–0	Croatia	King Peter 1 Stadium
10:06 AM

==== Pool E ====
Team	Pld	W	D	L	PD	Pts
Switzerland	2	2	0	0	+58	6
Malta	2	1	0	1	–3	4
Estonia	2	0	0	2	–55	2

9 June 2023	Switzerland	48–7	Estonia	King Peter 1 Stadium
17:44 PM				Referee: Lori Ramirez (FRA)

9 June 2023	Malta	24–10	Estonia	King Peter 1 Stadium
19:52 PM				Referee: Cara Senneka (GER)

10 June 2023	Switzerland	22–5	Malta	King Peter 1 Stadium
10:28 AM

==== Pool F ====
Team	Pld	W	D	L	PD	Pts
Lithuania	2	2	0	0	+19	6
Slovakia	2	1	0	1	+31	4
Luxembourg	2	0	0	2	–50	2

9 June 2023	Slovakia	33–0	Luxembourg	King Peter 1 Stadium
18:06 PM				Referee: Clémence Fayard (FRA)

9 June 2023	Lithuania	27–10	Luxembourg	King Peter 1 Stadium
20:14 PM				Referee: Lori Ramirez (FRA)

10 June 2023	Slovakia	10–12	Lithuania	King Peter 1 Stadium
10:50 AM

== Knockout Stage ==
=== Cup Final ===
Semi-finals
10 June 2023, 13:34 PM
Switzerland	34
Lithuania	5
10 June 2023, 13:56 PM
Slovakia	5
Andorra	12

Cup Final
10 June 2023, 18:47 PM
Switzerland	14
Andorra	5
3rd Place
10 June 2023, 18:30 PM
Slovakia	17
Lithuania	10

=== 5th–7th Place Playoff ===
Team	Pld	W	D	L	PD	Pts
Malta	2	2	0	0	+52	6
Montenegro	2	1	0	1	–15	4
Croatia	2	0	0	2	–37	2

10 June 2023	Malta	35–10	Montenegro	King Peter 1 Stadium
13:12 PM				Referee: Sandra Lihovida (LAT)

10 June 2023	Croatia	5–15	Montenegro	King Peter 1 Stadium
15:44 PM				Referee: Laura Wunsch (AUT)

10 June 2023	Croatia	0–27	Malta	King Peter 1 Stadium
18:08 PM				Referee: Lori Ramirez (FRA)

=== 8th Place Playoff ===
8th Place
10 June 2023, 16:06 PM
Luxembourg	43
Estonia	5

== Standings ==
Legend
Promoted to 2024 Trophy

Rank	Team
1st place, gold medalist(s)	Switzerland
2nd place, silver medalist(s)	Andorra
3rd place, bronze medalist(s)	Slovakia
4	Lithuania
5	Malta
6	Montenegro
7	Croatia
8	Luxembourg
9	Estonia
