= 2015 Exeter Sevens =

- Sevens Grand Prix Series V
- Host nation: England
- Date: 11–12 July 2015

Cup
- Champion: France
- Runner-up: England
- Third: Spain

Plate
- Winner: Wales
- Runner-up: Russia

Bowl
- Winner: Portugal
- Runner-up: Italy

The 2015 Exeter Sevens was the final tournament of the 2015 Rugby Europe Sevens Grand Prix Series. It was held over the weekend of 11–12 July 2015.

== Teams ==
The 12 participating teams for the tournament:

- Belgium
- England (Note: England and Wales have already qualified for the 2016 Olympic tournament as the combined Great Britain team.)
- France
- Georgia
- Germany
- Italy
- Lithuania
- Romania
- Portugal
- Russia
- Spain
- Wales

== Pool Stage ==
Key to colours in group tables
Teams that advanced to the Cup Quarterfinal

=== Pool A ===
Teams	Pld	W	D	L	PF	PA	+/−	Pts
France	3	3	0	0	104	15	+89	9
Germany	3	2	0	1	78	33	+45	7
Portugal	3	1	0	2	37	87	-50	5
Romania	3	0	0	3	26	110	-84	3

11 July 2015
11:30

France	38–5	Romania
	Report

Exeter

11 July 2015
11:52

Germany	28–5	Portugal
	Report

Exeter

11 July 2015
14:12

France	38–5	Portugal
	Report

Exeter

11 July 2015
14:34

Germany	45–0	Romania
	Report

Exeter

11 July 2015
16:54

France	28–5	Germany
	Report

Exeter

11 July 2015
17:16

Portugal	27–21	Romania
	Report

Exeter

=== Pool B ===
Teams	Pld	W	D	L	PF	PA	+/−	Pts
England	3	3	0	0	91	15	+76	9
Spain	3	2	0	1	38	60	–22	7
Lithuania	3	1	0	2	41	61	–20	5
Italy	3	0	0	3	19	53	–34	3

11 July 2015
12:58

England	17–5	Italy
	Report

Exeter

11 July 2015
13:20

Spain	21–12	Lithuania
	Report

Exeter

11 July 2015
15:40

Spain	17–0	Italy
	Report

Exeter

11 July 2015
16:02

England	26–10	Lithuania
	Report

Exeter

11 July 2015
18:22

Italy	14–19	Lithuania
	Report

Exeter

11 July 2015
18:44

Spain	0–48	England
	Report

Exeter

=== Pool C ===
Teams	Pld	W	D	L	PF	PA	+/−	Pts
Russia	3	3	0	0	65	12	+53	9
Georgia	3	2	0	1	53	29	+24	7
Wales	3	1	0	2	31	55	–24	5
Belgium	3	0	0	3	15	68	–53	3

11 July 2015
12:14

Belgium	10–19	Wales
	Report

Exeter

11 July 2015
12:36

Russia	17–7	Georgia
	Report

Exeter

11 July 2015
14:56

Belgium	5–27	Georgia
	Report

Exeter

11 July 2015
15:18

Russia	26–5	Wales
	Report

Exeter

11 July 2015
17:38

Belgium	0–22	Russia
	Report

Exeter

11 July 2015
18:00

Georgia	19–7	Wales
	Report

Exeter

== Knockout stage ==
=== Bowl ===
Semi-finals
12 July 2015 – 12:58 – Exeter
Portugal	22
Romania	17
12 July 2015 – 13:20 – Exeter
Italy	14
Belgium	5

Final
12 July 2015 – 16:02 – Exeter
Portugal	26
Italy	12
Third place
12 July 2015 – 15:40 – Exeter
Romania	8
Belgium	0

=== Plate ===
Quarter-finals
12 July 2015 – 11:30 – Exeter
France	31
Wales	7
12 July 2015 – 12:36 – Exeter
Germany	15
Georgia	5
12 July 2015 – 11:52 – Exeter
England	32
Lithuania	0
12 July 2015 – 12:14 – Exeter
Russia	5
Spain	14

Semi-finals
12 July 2015 – 14:12 – Exeter
Wales	17
Georgia	14
12 July 2015 – 14:34 – Exeter
Lithuania	5
Russia	26

Final
12 July 2015 – 17:16 – Exeter
Wales	14
Russia	10
Third place
12 July 2015 – 16:54 – Exeter
Georgia	0
Lithuania	24

=== Cup ===
Quarter-finals
12 July 2015 – 11:30 – Exeter
France	31
Wales	7
12 July 2015 – 12:36 – Exeter
Germany	15
Georgia	5
12 July 2015 – 11:52 – Exeter
England	32
Lithuania	0
12 July 2015 – 12:14 – Exeter
Russia	5
Spain	14

Semi-finals
12 July 2015 – 14:56 – Exeter
France	24
Germany	5
12 July 2015 – 15:18 – Exeter
England	19
Spain	0

Final
12 July 2015 – 18:00 – Exeter
France	14
England	5
Third place
12 July 2015 – 17:38 – Exeter
Germany	0
Spain	17
