= 2016 Rugby Europe Under-18 Sevens Championship =

2016 Under-18 Sevens Championship
- Host nation: Romania
- Date: 17–18 September

Cup
- Champion: Ireland
- Runner-up: France
- Third: Portugal

Plate
- Winner: Spain
- Runner-up: Russia

Bowl
- Winner: Luxembourg
- Runner-up: Poland

Tournament details
- Matches played: 34

The 2016 Rugby Europe Under-18 Sevens Championship was hosted by Romania in Bucharest from 17–18 September. Ireland won the Championship after beating France 31–5 in the final.

== Teams ==
- France
- Russia
- Poland
- Spain
- Portugal
- Germany
- Italy
- Luxembourg
- Ireland
- Romania
- Israel
- Moldova

== Pool stages ==
Legend
	Qualified for the Cup Quarterfinals
	Qualified for the Bowl Semifinals

=== Pool A ===
Team	P	W	D	L	PF	PA	PD
France	3	3	0	0	155	5	150
Russia	3	2	0	1	38	71	-33
Spain	3	1	0	2	48	71	-23
Poland	3	0	0	3	24	118	-94

17 September

France	45 - 5	Spain

Referee: (Italy) V. Schipani

17 September

Russia	24 - 12	Poland

Referee: (Belgium) K. Sulejmani

17 September

France	63 - 0	Poland

Referee: (Scotland) Sam Grove-White

17 September

Russia	14 - 12	Spain

Referee: (Romania) S. Razvan

17 September

France	47 - 0	Russia

Referee: (Portugal) P. Duarte

17 September

Poland	12 - 31	Spain

Referee: (Russia) S. Markov

=== Pool B ===
Team	P	W	D	L	PF	PA	PD
Portugal	3	3	0	0	76	47	29
Italy	3	2	0	1	59	31	28
Germany	3	1	0	2	38	44	-6
Luxembourg	3	0	0	3	34	85	-51

17 September

Portugal	33 - 19	Luxembourg

Referee: (Romania) S. Razvan

17 September

Germany	5 - 12	Italy

Referee: (Scotland) Sam Grove-White

17 September

Portugal	26 - 14	Italy

Referee: (Russia) S. Markov

17 September

Germany	19 - 15	Luxembourg

Referee: (Portugal) P. Duarte

17 September

Portugal	17 - 14	Germany

Referee: (Italy) V. Schipani

17 September

Italy	33 - 0	Luxembourg

Referee: (Belgium) K. Sulejmani

=== Pool C ===
Team	P	W	D	L	PF	PA	PD
Ireland	3	3	0	0	151	10	141
Romania	3	2	0	1	100	45	55
Moldova	3	0	1	2	12	109	-97
Israel	3	0	1	2	17	116	-99

17 September

Ireland	54 - 0	Moldova

Referee: (Russia) S. Markov

17 September

Romania	47 - 5	Israel

Referee: (Portugal) P. Duarte

17 September

Ireland	57 - 0	Israel

Referee: (Italy) V. Schipani

17 September

Romania	43 - 0	Moldova

Referee: (Belgium) K. Sulejmani

17 September

Israel	12 - 12	Moldova

Referee: (Romania) S. Razvan

17 September

Ireland	40 - 10	Romania

Referee: (Scotland) Sam Grove-White

== Finals ==
Cup Quarterfinals

Quarter-finals
France	35
Spain	0
Portugal	12
Germany	5
Ireland	26
Russia	12
Italy	10
Romania	0

Semi-finals
France	43
Italy	0
Ireland	36
Portugal	0

Cup Final
Ireland	31
France	5
3rd Place
Portugal	12
Italy	5

Plate Semifinals

Semi-finals
Spain	10
Romania	7
Russia	33
Germany	0

Plate Final
Spain	31
Russia	5
7th Place
Romania	14
Germany	10

Bowl Semifinals

Semi-finals
Poland	42
Moldova	0
Luxembourg	31
Israel	5

Bowl Final
Luxembourg	19
Poland	14
11th Place
Israel	17
Moldova	0

== Final standings ==
Rank	Team
1st place, gold medalist(s)	Ireland
2nd place, silver medalist(s)	France
3rd place, bronze medalist(s)	Portugal
4	Italy
5	Spain
6	Russia
7	Romania
8	Germany
9	Luxembourg
10	Poland
11	Israel
12	Moldova
