= 2019 Rugby Europe Under-18 Sevens Championship =

- Host nation: Poland
- Date: 17–18 August

Cup
- Champion: Ireland
- Runner-up: Spain
- Third: France

The 2019 Rugby Europe Under-18 Sevens Championship was held in Gdańsk, Poland from 17–18 August. Ireland beat Spain 26–12 in the finals to win the championship.

== Teams ==
- Ireland
- Spain
- France
- Georgia
- Portugal
- Germany
- Russia
- Belgium
- Poland
- Romania
- Lithuania
- Luxembourg

== Pool stages ==
Legend
	Qualified for the Cup Quarterfinals
	Qualified for the Challenge Trophy Semifinals

=== Pool A ===
Team	P	W	D	L	PF	PA	PD	Pts
France	3	3	0	0	75	7	68	9
Portugal	3	2	0	1	63	48	9	7
Poland	3	1	0	2	24	56	-32	5
Romania	3	0	0	3	24	69	-45	3

17 August

Poland	19 - 14	Romania

17 August

Portugal	20 - 5	Poland

17 August

Portugal	21 - 10	Romania

17 August

France	22 - 0	Poland

17 August

France	24 - 7	Portugal

17 August

France	29 - 0	Romania

=== Pool B ===
Team	P	W	D	L	PF	PA	PD	Pts
Georgia	3	3	0	0	87	29	58	9
Ireland	3	2	0	1	93	31	62	7
Russia	3	1	0	2	71	70	1	5
Luxembourg	3	0	0	3	10	131	-121	3

17 August

Georgia	27 - 12	Russia

17 August

Georgia	29 - 10	Luxembourg

17 August

Georgia	31 - 7	Ireland

17 August

Ireland	43 - 0	Luxembourg

17 August

Ireland	43 - 0	Russia

17 August

Russia	59 - 0	Luxembourg

=== Pool C ===
Team	P	W	D	L	PF	PA	PD	Pts
Spain	3	3	0	0	83	21	62	9
Germany	3	1	1	1	76	48	28	7
Belgium	3	1	1	1	56	65	-9	5
Lithuania	3	0	0	3	24	105	-81	3

17 August

Spain	19 - 14	Germany

17 August

Germany	22 - 22	Belgium

17 August

Spain	31 - 7	Lithuania

17 August

Spain	33 - 0	Belgium

17 August

Belgium	34 - 10	Lithuania

17 August

Germany	40 - 7	Lithuania

== Finals ==
Cup Quarterfinals

Quarter-finals
France	53
Russia	0
Ireland	15
Germany	5
Spain	19
Portugal	10
Georgia	21
Belgium	5

Semi-finals
Ireland	24
France	14
Spain	19
Georgia	14

Cup Final
Ireland	26
Spain	12
3rd Place
France	14
Georgia	10

Shield Semifinals

Semi-finals
Germany	26
Russia	12
Portugal	29
Belgium	10

Shield Final
Portugal	19
Germany	14
7th Place
Russia	26
Belgium	19

Challenge Trophy Semifinals

Semi-finals
Poland	24
Luxembourg	5
Romania	17
Lithuania	10

Challenge Trophy Final
Poland	24
Romania	19
11th Place
Lithuania	24
Luxembourg	7

== Final standings ==
Rank	Team	Pts
1st place, gold medalist(s)	Ireland	20
2nd place, silver medalist(s)	Spain	18
3rd place, bronze medalist(s)	France	16
4	Georgia	14
5	Portugal	12
6	Germany	10
7	Russia	8
8	Belgium	6
9	Poland	4
10	Romania	3
11	Lithuania	2
12	Luxembourg	1
