= Melrose Cup =

Rugby World Cup Sevens trophy

The Melrose Cup is the main prize of the Rugby World Cup Sevens. The troph, made by Thomas Lyte, is named after the town of Melrose, Scotland, the birthplace of rugby sevens where in 1883 local butcher boy Ned Haig with help of his boss David Sanderson invited local rugby union teams to play a small tournament as a fundraiser event for the Melrose Rugby Club that had financial issues. The trophy has been presented to the winner of the world cup since the inaugural tournament in 1993. The only teams to have held the trophy are England, Wales, Fiji and current cup holders New Zealand. The winner of the first tournament was England.
