= Latvian Rugby Federation =

Governing body for rugby union in Latvia

Latvijas Regbija federācija
- Sport: Rugby union
- Founded: 1991 (de facto 1960)
- World Rugby affiliation: 1991
- Rugby Europe affiliation: 1992
- President: Kārlis Vents
- Men's coach: (Latvia) Mārcis Rullis
- Women's coach: (South Africa) AJ De Carvalho Abreu
- Sevens coach: (Wales) Jean Baptiste Bruzulier
- Website: rugby-latvia.lv

The Latvian Rugby Federation (Latvian: Latvijas Regbija federācija) is the governing body for rugby in Latvia. It oversees the various national teams and the development of the sport.

Rugby's history in Latvia starts in the early 20th century with clearer origins of rugby union dating to the 1960s. The federation was founded in 1991 as a member of World Rugby, following Latvia's freedom after suffering under Soviet occupation. As rugby sevens and rugby league was not played in the Soviet Union, the restoration of independence opened the opportunities for the growth of other variations of rugby. The federation was admitted to FIRA in 1992.

== Leadership ==
Position	Name
President and Chairman of the Board	Kārlis Vents
Board Member	Andrejs Šilinskis
Board Member	Zane Sirsniņa-Kukaine
General Secretary	Anete Skrastiņa
Press Secretary, Council Member	Toms Ābele
Council Member	Edgars Cīrulis
Council Member	Kārlis Sarkanis

== See also ==
- Rugby union in Latvia
- Latvia national rugby union team
- Latvia national rugby sevens team
- Latvia national rugby league team
- Latvia Rugby League
