= SCM Timișoara =

Romanian sports club

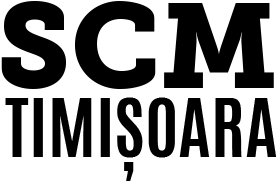
- Full name: Sport Club Municipal Timișoara
- Nicknames: Timișorenii (People from Timișoara)
- Founded: 1947; 79 years ago
- Based in: Timișoara, Romania
- Colours: White, Purple, Gold
- Chairman: Radu Țoancă
- Website: Official website

SCM Timișoara is a Romanian sports society from Timișoara, Romania, founded in 1947.
