= 2021 Rugby Europe Under-18 Sevens Championship =

- Countries: Poland
- Number of teams: 8
- Champions: France
- Runners-up: Russia
- Matches played: 24

The 2021 Rugby Europe Under-18 Sevens Championship took place in Gdańsk between 17-18 July. France were named Champions after trouncing Russia 38–0 in the final.

== Teams ==
- Russia
- Spain
- Belgium
- Czech Republic
- France
- Germany
- Poland
- Lithuania

== Pool stages ==
=== Pool A ===
Team	P	W	D	L	PF	PA	PD	Pts
Russia	3	2	0	1	46	47	-1	7
Spain	3	2	0	1	60	47	13	7
Belgium	3	1	0	2	29	48	-19	5
Czech Republic	3	1	0	2	56	49	7	5

July 17
11:14 AM (Local)

Russia	15 - 0	Belgium
	Report

Referee: (Switzerland) Ethan GLASS

July 17
11:36 AM (Local)

Spain	22 - 14	Czech Republic
	Report

Referee: (France) Alexis DARCHE

July 17
13:50 PM (Local)

Russia	5 - 35	Czech Republic
	Report

Referee: (Germany) Jonathan TEPPLER

July 18
14:12 PM (Local)

Spain	26 - 7	Belgium
	Report

Referee: (France) Alexis DARCHE

July 18
16:50 PM (Local)

Belgium	22 - 7	Czech Republic
	Report

Referee: (Italy) Filippo RUSSO

July 18
17:12 PM (Local)

Spain	12 - 26	Russia
	Report

Referee: (Wales) Ben CONNOR

=== Pool B ===
Team	P	W	D	L	PF	PA	PD	Pts
France	3	3	0	0	157	0	157	9
Germany	3	2	0	1	57	42	15	7
Poland	3	1	0	2	15	90	-75	5
Lithuania	3	0	0	3	5	102	-97	3

July 17
10:30 AM (Local)

Germany	26 - 0	Poland
	Report

Referee: (Republic of Ireland) Cris LOUGH

July 17
10:52 AM (Local)

France	56 - 0	Lithuania
	Report

Referee: (Germany) Jonathan TEPPLER

July 17
13:06 PM (Local)

Germany	31 - 0	Lithuania
	Report

Referee: (Italy) Filippo RUSSO

July 17
13:28 PM (Local)

France	59 - 0	Poland
	Report

Referee: (Wales) Ben CONNOR

July 18
16:06 PM (Local)

Poland	15 - 5	Lithuania
	Report

Referee: (Switzerland) Ethan GLASS

July 18
16:28 PM (Local)

France	42 - 0	Germany
	Report

Referee: (Republic of Ireland) Cris LOUGH

== Finals ==
Cup

Quarter-finals
Russia	43
Lithuania	0
Belgium	12
Germany	5
France	50
Czech Republic	0
Spain	24
Poland	0

Semi-finals
Russia	17
Belgium	12
France	48
Spain	0

Cup Final
France	38
Russia	0
3rd Place
Spain	17
Belgium	0

Ranking Final for 5th & 7th Place

Semi-finals
Poland	19
Czech Republic	10
Germany	24
Lithuania	5

5th Place
Poland	17
Germany	12
7th Place
Czech Republic	40
Lithuania	0

== Final standings ==
Rank	Team	Pts
1st place, gold medalist(s)	France	20
2nd place, silver medalist(s)	Russia	18
3rd place, bronze medalist(s)	Spain	16
4	Belgium	14
5	Poland	12
6	Germany	10
7	Czech Republic	8
8	Lithuania	6
