= Rugby World Cup Sevens =

International rugby sevens tournament

- Current season or competition: 2022 Rugby World Cup Sevens
- Sport: Rugby union
- Inaugural season: 1993 (men); 2009 (women)
- Ceased: 2022
- Number of teams: 24 (men); 16 (women)
- Holders: Fiji (men) (2022); Australia (women) (2022)
- Most titles: New Zealand Fiji (men) (3 titles); New Zealand Australia (women) (2 titles)
- Website: rwcsevens.com

Rugby World Cup Sevens (RWCS) was the former quadrennial world championship of rugby sevens, a variant of rugby union. Organised by World Rugby, it consisted of men's and women's tournaments, and was the highest level of competition in the sport outside of the Summer Olympics.

The first tournament was held in 1993 in Scotland, and was won by England. The winners of the men's tournament were awarded the Melrose Cup, named after the Scottish town of Melrose where the first rugby sevens game was played. A women's tournament was introduced at the 2009 Rugby World Cup Sevens in Dubai, and was first won by Australia.

After the 2013 Rugby World Cup Sevens, the tournament took an extended, five-year hiatus to allow the integration of rugby sevens at the Summer Olympics into the competitive calendar. The 2022 Rugby World Cup Sevens was held at Cape Town Stadium, in Cape Town, South Africa, with Fiji winning the men's tournament and Australia winning the women's tournament.

In January 2025, it was reported that World Rugby will not schedule future Rugby World Cup Sevens. Instead, the winners of the SVNS tournament series will be crowned as world champions.

== History ==
The Rugby World Cup Sevens originated with a proposal by the Scottish Rugby Union to the International Rugby Board. The inaugural tournament was held at Murrayfield in Edinburgh in 1993, and has been held every four years since. England won the inaugural tournament, defeating Australia 21–17 in the final.

Hong Kong, which had played a major role in the international development of the Sevens game, hosted the 1997 event. The final was won by Fiji over South Africa. The 2001 tournament was held in Mar del Plata, Argentina. The 2005 event returned to Hong Kong.

At the 2009 tournament, Wales, Samoa, Argentina and Kenya combined to stun the rugby world by defeating the traditional powerhouses of New Zealand, England, South Africa and Fiji in the quarter-finals, guaranteeing a new Melrose Cup winner. Wales and Argentina met in the final, with Wales triumphing 19–12.

The IRB made a submission to the International Olympic Committee in 2005 for rugby sevens to become an Olympic sport. However, the submission failed because committee members felt IRB needed to improve promotion of the women's game. To that end, the IRB implemented the first women's Rugby World Cup Sevens tournament in 2009. The 2009 Rugby World Cup Sevens was held in Dubai during the first weekend of March 2009 and included a separate women's tournament. Cumulative attendance was 78,000.

Prior to the inclusion of rugby sevens into the Olympic Games, the IRB stated that their intention would be to end the World Cup Sevens so that the Olympic Games would be the one pinnacle in a four-year cycle for Rugby Sevens. The adoption of rugby sevens and golf was recommended to the full International Olympic Committee council by its executive board in August 2009. The International Olympic Committee voted in 2009 for rugby sevens to become a medal event at the 2016 Summer Olympics in Rio de Janeiro.

The IRB Council in 2010 awarded the hosting of the 2013 tournament to Moscow, Russia from a field of eight nations that had expressed formal interest in hosting. The IRB intended that the exposure to rugby from hosting the World Cup Sevens would accelerate the growth of rugby in Russia. It featured 24 men's teams and 16 women's teams.

The IRB originally intended to discontinue Rugby World Cup Sevens after the 2013 edition, in favour of the Olympic tournament. However, it was later decided in 2013 that the tournament would continue to be held, as it can accommodate a larger field than the Olympic rugby sevens tournaments, and would allow an elite-level competition to take place biennially from 2016. The next tournament would be held in 2018, one year later than usual, in order to accommodate the integration of the Olympics into the competitive calendar. On 13 May 2015, it was announced that the United States would host the 2018 Rugby World Cup Sevens.

== Attendance ==
Tournament Attendance
| Year | Total Attendance | Average Daily Attendance |
|---|---|---|
| 1993 | – | – |
| 1997 | – | – |
| 2001 | – | – |
| 2005 | 120,000 | 40,000 |
| 2009 | 78,000 | 26,000 |
| 2013 | – | – |
| 2018 | 100,000 | 33,333 |
| 2022 | 105,000 | 35,000 |

== Men's tournament ==
| Ed. | Year | Host | First place game | | | Losing semifinalists | | Num. teams |
| Ed. | Year | Host | (gold) Champion | Score | (silver) Runner-up | Losing semifinalists | | Num. teams |
|---|---|---|---|---|---|---|---|---|
| 1 | 1993 | (Scotland) Edinburgh | England | 21–17 | Australia | Fiji | Ireland | 24 |
| 2 | 1997 | Hong Kong | Fiji | 24–21 | South Africa | New Zealand | Samoa | 24 |
| 3 | 2001 | (Argentina) Mar del Plata | New Zealand | 31–12 | Australia | Fiji | Argentina | 24 |
| 4 | 2005 | Hong Kong | Fiji | 29–19 | New Zealand | Australia | England | 24 |
| 5 | 2009 | (United Arab Emirates) Dubai | Wales | 19–12 | Argentina | Samoa | Kenya | 24 |
| 6 | 2013 | (Russia) Moscow | New Zealand | 33–0 | England | Fiji | Kenya | 24 |
| 7 | 2018 | (United States) San Francisco | New Zealand | 33–12 | England | South Africa | Fiji | 24 |
| 8 | 2022 | (South Africa) Cape Town | Fiji | 29–12 | New Zealand | Ireland | Australia | 24 |

=== Notable players ===
Player of the Tournament
| Year | Champion | Player |
|---|---|---|
| 1993 | England | (England) Lawrence Dallaglio |
| 1997 | Fiji | (Fiji) Waisale Serevi |
| 2001 | New Zealand | (New Zealand) Jonah Lomu |
| 2005 | Fiji | (Fiji) Waisale Serevi |
| 2009 | Wales | (Wales) Tal Selley |
| 2013 | New Zealand | (New Zealand) Tim Mikkelson |
| 2018 | New Zealand | (New Zealand) Scott Curry |
| 2022 | Fiji | (Fiji) Kaminieli Rasaku |

The 2001 tournament added another chapter to the legend of New Zealand's Jonah Lomu. Lomu, used sparingly in pool play, received his opportunity when New Zealand captain Eric Rush broke his leg in the last pool match. Lomu went on to score three tries in the final.

In 2005, Waisale Serevi came out of international retirement to captain and lead Fiji to their second Melrose Cup. At the 2009 tournament, Wales defeated Argentina 19–12 in the final, and Wales' Taliesin Selley was named player of the tournament.

=== Player Records ===
The top all-time try-scorer for the Rugby World Cup Sevens is Fijian winger Marika Vunibaka, who scored 23 tries in three of the Sevens World Cups he played in from 1997 to 2005. Serevi ranks second with 19 career World Cup Sevens tries, over four tournaments from 1993 to 2005. Brian Lima ranks third with 17 tries. The top points scorers are Serevi with 297 points, Vunibaka with 115 points, and Lima with 101 points.

Most career tries
| Rank | Player | Tries |
|---|---|---|
| 1 | (Fiji) Marika Vunibaka | 23 |
| 2 | (Fiji) Waisale Serevi | 19 |
| 3 | (Samoa) Brian Lima | 17 |
| 4 | (Scotland) Andrew Turnbull | 16 |
| 5 | (New Zealand) Roger Randle | 14 |
| 5 | (Australia) Brendan Williams | 14 |
| 7 | (Tonga) Tevita Tuʻifua | 14 |
| 8 | (England) Andy Harriman | 12 |
| 8 | (Portugal) António Aguilar | 12 |
| 10 | (South Africa) Joost van der Westhuizen | 11 |

Most career points
| Rank | Player | Points |
|---|---|---|
| 1 | (Fiji) Waisale Serevi | 297 |
| 2 | (Fiji) Marika Vunibaka | 115 |
| 3 | (Samoa) Brian Lima | 101 |
| 4 | (Fiji) Amasio Valence | 100 |
| 5 | (England) Ben Gollings | 98 |
| 6 | (New Zealand) Glen Osborne | 91 |
| 7 | (South Africa) Andre Joubert | 88 |
| 8 | (Samoa) Andrew Aiolupo | 85 |
| 8 | (Scotland) Colin Gregor | 85 |
| 10 | (England) Nick Beal | 84 |

Most career matches
| Rank | Player | Matches |
|---|---|---|
| 1 | (Fiji) Waisale Serevi | 31 |
| 2 | (Kenya) Collins Injera | 21 |
| 3 | (Fiji) Marika Vunibaka | 19 |
| 4 | (Samoa) Brian Lima | 18 |
| 5 | (Scotland) Andrew Turnbull | 17 |
| 6 | (South Korea) Min-Suk Yoo | 16 |
| 6 | (Portugal) Pedro Leal | 16 |
| 8 | 8 players tied with 15 | |

Up to date as of 12 September 2022

=== Results by nation ===
| Team | (Scotland) 1993 | (Hong Kong) 1997 | (Argentina) 2001 | (Hong Kong) 2005 | (United Arab Emirates) 2009 | (Russia) 2013 | (United States) 2018 | (South Africa) 2022 | Years |
|---|---|---|---|---|---|---|---|---|---|
| (Cooperation Council for the Arab States of the Gulf) Arabian Gulf | | | | | 21st | | | | 1 |
| Argentina | 9th | 13th | 3rd | 5th | 2nd | 11th | 5th | 5th | 8 |
| Australia | 2nd | 5th | 2nd | 3rd | 10th | 5th | 10th | 4th | 8 |
| Canada | 15th | 21st | 5th | 18th | 13th | 9th | 12th | 13th | 8 |
| Chile | | | 17th | | | | 17th | 14th | 3 |
| Cook Islands | | 11th | 13th | | | | | | 2 |
| Chinese Taipei | 21st | | 21st | 21st | | | | | 3 |
| England | 1st | 5th | 5th | 3rd | 5th | 2nd | 2nd | 9th | 8 |
| Fiji | 3rd | 1st | 3rd | 1st | 5th | 3rd | 4th | 1st | 8 |
| France | 15th | 5th | 21st | 5th | 13th | 5th | 8th | 6th | 8 |
| Georgia | | | 10th | 11th | 21st | 19th | | | 4 |
| Germany | | | | | | | | 18th | 1 |
| Ireland | 3rd | 19th | 19th | 13th | 18th | | 9th | 3rd | 7 |
| Italy | 17th | | | 17th | 21st | | | | 3 |
| Hong Kong | 17th | 10th | 21st | 21st | 19th | 21st | 18th | 19th | 8 |
| Jamaica | | | | | | | 24th | 24th | 2 |
| Japan | 13th | 17th | 13th | 13th | 21st | 18th | 15th | | 7 |
| Kenya | | | 19th | 19th | 3rd | 4th | 16th | 12th | 6 |
| South Korea | 11th | 5th | 13th | 21st | | | | 21st | 5 |
| Latvia | 21st | | | | | | | | 1 |
| Morocco | | 19th | | | | | | | 1 |
| Namibia | 21st | 21st | | | | | | | 2 |
| Netherlands | 21st | | | | | | | | 1 |
| New Zealand | 7th | 3rd | 1st | 2nd | 5th | 1st | 1st | 2nd | 8 |
| Papua New Guinea | | | | | | | 21st | | 1 |
| Philippines | | | | | | 21st | | | 1 |
| Portugal | | 21st | 18th | 10th | 11th | 13th | | 22nd | 6 |
| Romania | 17th | 13th | | | | | | | 2 |
| Russia | | | 9th | 11th | | 17th | 14th | | 4 |
| South Africa | 5th | 2nd | 5th | 5th | 5th | 5th | 3rd | 7th | 8 |
| Samoa | 5th | 3rd | 5th | 9th | 3rd | 10th | 13th | 8th | 8 |
| Scotland | 14th | 11th | | 5th | 9th | 11th | 7th | 16th | 7 |
| Spain | 10th | 13th | 11th | | | 21st | | | 4 |
| Tonga | 7th | 9th | | 19th | 11th | 13th | 22nd | 20th | 7 |
| Tunisia | | | | 13th | 13th | 21st | | | 3 |
| Uganda | | | | | | | 19th | 17th | 2 |
| Uruguay | | | | 21st | 19th | 19th | 20th | 10th | 5 |
| United States | 17th | 18th | 13th | 13th | 13th | 13th | 6th | 11th | 8 |
| Wales | 11th | 13th | 11th | | 1st | 5th | 11th | 15th | 7 |
| Zimbabwe | | 21st | 21st | | 17th | 13th | 23rd | 23rd | 6 |

== Women's tournament ==
| Ed. | Year | Host | First place game | | | Losing semifinalists | | Num. teams |
| Ed. | Year | Host | (gold) Champion | Score | (silver) Runner-up | Losing semifinalists | | Num. teams |
|---|---|---|---|---|---|---|---|---|
| 1 | 2009 | United Arab Emirates | Australia | 15–10 | New Zealand | United States | South Africa | 16 |
| 2 | 2013 | (Russia) Moscow | New Zealand | 29–12 | Canada | United States | Spain | 16 |
| 3 | 2018 | (United States) San Francisco | New Zealand | 29–0 | France | Australia | United States | 16 |
| 4 | 2022 | (South Africa) Cape Town | Australia | 24–22 | New Zealand | France | United States | 16 |

=== Results by nation ===
| Team | (United Arab Emirates) 2009 | (Russia) 2013 | (United States) 2018 | (South Africa) 2022 | Years |
|---|---|---|---|---|---|
| Australia | 1st | 5th | 3rd | 1st | 4 |
| Brazil | 10th | 13th | 13th | 11th | 4 |
| Canada | 6th | 2nd | 7th | 6th | 4 |
| China | 9th | 11th | 12th | 13th | 4 |
| Colombia | | | | 16th | 1 |
| England | 5th | 6th | 9th | 8th | 4 |
| Fiji | | 9th | 11th | 5th | 3 |
| France | 7th | 11th | 2nd | 3rd | 4 |
| Ireland | | 7th | 6th | 7th | 3 |
| Italy | 11th | | | | 1 |
| Japan | 13th | 13th | 10th | 9th | 4 |
| Madagascar | | | | 15th | 1 |
| Mexico | | | 16th | | 1 |
| Netherlands | 13th | 10th | | | 2 |
| New Zealand | 2nd | 1st | 1st | 2nd | 4 |
| Papua New Guinea | | | 15th | | 1 |
| Poland | | | | 10th | 1 |
| Russia | 11th | 7th | 8th | | 3 |
| South Africa | 4th | 13th | 14th | 14th | 4 |
| Spain | 7th | 4th | 5th | 12th | 4 |
| Thailand | 13th | | | | 1 |
| Tunisia | | 13th | | | 1 |
| United States | 3rd | 3rd | 4th | 4th | 4 |
| Uganda | 13th | | | | 1 |

== See also ==
- World Rugby Sevens Series
- World Rugby Women's Sevens Series
- Rugby sevens at the Summer Olympics
- Hong Kong Sevens
- Rugby World Cup
- Women's Rugby World Cup
