= 1997 Rugby World Cup Sevens =

International sporting tournament

1997年橄欖球七人欖球賽

Tournament details
- Host nation: British Hong Kong
- Dates: 21 March – 23 March
- No. of nations: 24

Final positions
- Champions: Fiji
- Runner-up: South Africa

Tournament statistics
- Top scorer(s): Waisale Serevi Fiji (117 pts); Marika Vunibaka Fiji (12 tries)

The 1997 Rugby World Cup Sevens was the second edition of the Rugby World Cup Sevens tournament and the first to be held in Hong Kong. It was the last major sporting event to be held in the then British dependency before the transfer of sovereignty to China which took place just three months later. Fiji defeated South Africa 24–21 to take the title for the first time. The final is considered to be one of the best sevens matches of all time.

== Participating nations ==
The twenty four teams were divided into eight pools of three as follows:

| Pool A: England; Canada; Zimbabwe | Pool B: Romania; Australia; Scotland | Pool C: New Zealand; Japan; Tonga | Pool D: Fiji; Portugal; Hong Kong |

| Pool E: France; United States; South Korea | Pool F: Spain; Cook Islands; Morocco | Pool G: Ireland; Argentina; South Africa | Pool H: Namibia; Samoa; Wales |

== Day 1 results ==
=== Pool A ===
21 March 1997
13:00
POOL A

| England | 33 – 12 | Canada |

Hong Kong Stadium, Hong Kong

21 March 1997
15:41
POOL A

| Zimbabwe | 42 – 7 | Canada |

Hong Kong Stadium, Hong Kong

21 March 1997
18:51
POOL A

| England | 26 – 7 | Zimbabwe |

Hong Kong Stadium, Hong Kong

=== Pool B ===
21 March 1997
13:20
POOL B

| Australia | 19 – 19 | Scotland |

Hong Kong Stadium, Hong Kong

21 March 1997
16:03
POOL B

| Romania | 14 – 26 | Scotland |

Hong Kong Stadium, Hong Kong

21 March 1997
19:10
POOL B

| Australia | 38 – 7 | Romania |

Hong Kong Stadium, Hong Kong

=== Pool C ===
21 March 1997
13:40
POOL C

| New Zealand | 47 – 14 | Japan |

Hong Kong Stadium, Hong Kong

21 March 1997
16:21
POOL C

| Tonga | 35 – 7 | Japan |

Hong Kong Stadium, Hong Kong

21 March 1997
19:30
POOL C

| New Zealand | 21 – 7 | Tonga |

Hong Kong Stadium, Hong Kong

=== Pool D ===
21 March 1997
14:00
POOL D

| Fiji | 59 – 0 | Portugal |

Hong Kong Stadium, Hong Kong

21 March 1997
16:40
POOL D

| Hong Kong | 33 – 12 | Portugal |

Hong Kong Stadium, Hong Kong

21 March 1997
19:50
POOL D

| Fiji | 45 – 0 | Hong Kong |

Hong Kong Stadium, Hong Kong

=== Pool E ===
21 March 1997
14:20
POOL E

| France | 35 – 5 | United States |

Hong Kong Stadium, Hong Kong

21 March 1997
17:00
POOL E

| South Korea | 7 – 33 | United States |

Hong Kong Stadium, Hong Kong

21 March 1997
20:10
POOL E

| France | 38 – 5 | South Korea |

Hong Kong Stadium, Hong Kong

=== Pool F ===
21 March 1997
14:40
POOL F

| Spain | 26 – 5 | Morocco |

Hong Kong Stadium, Hong Kong

21 March 1997
17:19
POOL F

| Cook Islands | 31 – 17 | Morocco |

Hong Kong Stadium, Hong Kong

21 March 1997
20:30
POOL F

| Spain | 31 – 12 | Cook Islands |

Hong Kong Stadium, Hong Kong

=== Pool G ===
21 March 1997
15:00
POOL G

| South Africa | 45 – 7 | Argentina |

Hong Kong Stadium, Hong Kong

21 March 1997
17:40
POOL G

| Ireland | 22 – 31 | Argentina |

Hong Kong Stadium, Hong Kong

21 March 1997
20:50
POOL G

| South Africa | 38 – 5 | Ireland |

Hong Kong Stadium, Hong Kong

=== Pool H ===
21 March 1997
15:20
POOL H

| Western Samoa | 48 – 5 | Namibia |

Hong Kong Stadium, Hong Kong

21 March 1997
18:32
POOL H

| Wales | 12 – 12 | Namibia |

Hong Kong Stadium, Hong Kong

21 March 1997
21:10
POOL H

| Western Samoa | 26 – 24 | Wales |

Hong Kong Stadium, Hong Kong

=== Seedings after Day 1 ===
| Seed | Day 2 Pool | Team | Pld | W | D | L | PF | PA | PD | Pts |
|---|---|---|---|---|---|---|---|---|---|---|
| 1 | A2 | Fiji | 2 | 2 | 0 | 0 | 104 | 0 | +104 | 6 |
| 2 | B2 | South Africa | 2 | 2 | 0 | 0 | 83 | 12 | +71 | 6 |
| 3 | C2 | Western Samoa | 2 | 2 | 0 | 0 | 74 | 29 | +45 | 6 |
| 4 | D2 | France | 2 | 2 | 0 | 0 | 73 | 10 | +63 | 6 |
| 5 | E2 | New Zealand | 2 | 2 | 0 | 0 | 68 | 21 | +47 | 6 |
| 6 | F2 | England | 2 | 2 | 0 | 0 | 59 | 19 | +40 | 6 |
| 7 | G2 | Spain | 2 | 2 | 0 | 0 | 57 | 17 | +40 | 6 |
| 8 | H2 | Australia | 2 | 1 | 1 | 0 | 57 | 26 | +31 | 5 |
| 9 | H2 | Scotland | 2 | 1 | 1 | 0 | 45 | 33 | +12 | 5 |
| 10 | G2 | Zimbabwe | 2 | 1 | 0 | 1 | 49 | 33 | +16 | 4 |
| 11 | F2 | Cook Islands | 2 | 1 | 0 | 1 | 43 | 48 | −5 | 4 |
| 12 | E2 | Tonga | 2 | 1 | 0 | 1 | 42 | 28 | +14 | 4 |
| 13 | D2 | United States | 2 | 1 | 0 | 1 | 38 | 42 | −4 | 4 |
| 14 | C2 | Argentina | 2 | 1 | 0 | 1 | 38 | 67 | −29 | 4 |
| 15 | B2 | Hong Kong | 2 | 1 | 0 | 1 | 33 | 57 | −24 | 4 |
| 16 | A2 | Wales | 2 | 0 | 1 | 1 | 36 | 38 | −2 | 3 |
| 17 | A2 | Namibia | 2 | 0 | 1 | 1 | 17 | 60 | −43 | 3 |
| 18 | B2 | Ireland | 2 | 0 | 0 | 2 | 27 | 69 | −42 | 2 |
| 19 | C2 | Morocco | 2 | 0 | 0 | 2 | 22 | 57 | −35 | 2 |
| 20 | D2 | Romania | 2 | 0 | 0 | 2 | 21 | 64 | −43 | 2 |
| 21 | E2 | Japan | 2 | 0 | 0 | 2 | 21 | 82 | −61 | 2 |
| 22 | F2 | Canada | 2 | 0 | 0 | 2 | 19 | 75 | −56 | 2 |
| 23 | G2 | South Korea | 2 | 0 | 0 | 2 | 12 | 71 | −59 | 2 |
| 24 | H2 | Portugal | 2 | 0 | 0 | 2 | 12 | 92 | −80 | 2 |

== Day 2 results ==
Key to colours in group tables
Team that progressed to the Cup Quarter-finals
Team that progressed to the Plate Quarter-finals
Team that progressed to the Bowl Quarter-finals

All times Hong Kong time (UTC+1)

=== Pool A ===
| Pos | Team | Pld | W | D | L | PF | PA | PD | Pts |
|---|---|---|---|---|---|---|---|---|---|
| 1 | Fiji | 2 | 2 | 0 | 0 | 101 | 0 | +101 | 6 |
| 2 | Wales | 2 | 1 | 0 | 1 | 40 | 40 | 0 | 4 |
| 3 | Namibia | 2 | 0 | 0 | 2 | 5 | 106 | −101 | 2 |

22 March 1997
10:59

| Fiji | 66 – 0 | Namibia |

Hong Kong Stadium, Hong Kong

22 March 1997
13:40

| Wales | 40 – 5 | Namibia |

Hong Kong Stadium, Hong Kong

22 March 1997
16:19

| Fiji | 35 – 0 | Wales |

Hong Kong Stadium, Hong Kong

=== Pool B ===
| Pos | Team | Pld | W | D | L | PF | PA | PD | Pts |
|---|---|---|---|---|---|---|---|---|---|
| 1 | South Africa | 2 | 2 | 0 | 0 | 63 | 12 | +51 | 6 |
| 2 | Hong Kong | 2 | 1 | 0 | 1 | 31 | 34 | −3 | 4 |
| 3 | Ireland | 2 | 0 | 0 | 2 | 12 | 60 | −48 | 2 |

22 March 1997
11:19

| South Africa | 34 – 7 | Ireland |

Hong Kong Stadium, Hong Kong

22 March 1997
13:59

| Hong Kong | 26 – 5 | Ireland |

Hong Kong Stadium, Hong Kong

22 March 1997
16:39

| South Africa | 29 – 5 | Hong Kong |

Hong Kong Stadium, Hong Kong

=== Pool C ===
| Pos | Team | Pld | W | D | L | PF | PA | PD | Pts |
|---|---|---|---|---|---|---|---|---|---|
| 1 | Western Samoa | 2 | 2 | 0 | 0 | 70 | 12 | +58 | 6 |
| 2 | Argentina | 2 | 1 | 0 | 1 | 45 | 35 | +10 | 4 |
| 3 | Morocco | 2 | 0 | 0 | 2 | 7 | 75 | −68 | 2 |

22 March 1997
11:39

| Western Samoa | 42 – 0 | Morocco |

Hong Kong Stadium, Hong Kong

22 March 1997
14:19

| Argentina | 33 – 7 | Morocco |

Hong Kong Stadium, Hong Kong

22 March 1997
16:58

| Western Samoa | 28 – 12 | Argentina |

Hong Kong Stadium, Hong Kong

=== Pool D ===
| Pos | Team | Pld | W | D | L | PF | PA | PD | Pts |
|---|---|---|---|---|---|---|---|---|---|
| 1 | France | 2 | 2 | 0 | 0 | 73 | 7 | +66 | 6 |
| 2 | Romania | 2 | 1 | 0 | 1 | 17 | 45 | −28 | 4 |
| 3 | United States | 2 | 0 | 0 | 2 | 19 | 57 | −38 | 2 |

22 March 1997
12:00

| France | 33 – 0 | Romania |

Hong Kong Stadium, Hong Kong

22 March 1997
14:38

| United States | 12 – 17 | Romania |

Hong Kong Stadium, Hong Kong

22 March 1997
17:19

| France | 40 – 7 | United States |

Hong Kong Stadium, Hong Kong

=== Pool E ===
| Pos | Team | Pld | W | D | L | PF | PA | PD | Pts |
|---|---|---|---|---|---|---|---|---|---|
| 1 | New Zealand | 2 | 2 | 0 | 0 | 78 | 5 | +73 | 6 |
| 2 | Tonga | 2 | 1 | 0 | 1 | 40 | 57 | −17 | 4 |
| 3 | Japan | 2 | 0 | 0 | 2 | 26 | 82 | −56 | 2 |

22 March 1997
12:19

| New Zealand | 47 – 0 | Japan |

Hong Kong Stadium, Hong Kong

22 March 1997
14:59

| Tonga | 35 – 26 | Japan |

Hong Kong Stadium, Hong Kong

22 March 1997
17:41

| New Zealand | 31 – 5 | Tonga |

Hong Kong Stadium, Hong Kong

=== Pool F ===
| Pos | Team | Pld | W | D | L | PF | PA | PD | Pts |
|---|---|---|---|---|---|---|---|---|---|
| 1 | England | 2 | 2 | 0 | 0 | 59 | 17 | +42 | 6 |
| 2 | Cook Islands | 2 | 1 | 0 | 1 | 15 | 29 | −14 | 4 |
| 3 | Canada | 2 | 0 | 0 | 2 | 7 | 35 | −28 | 2 |

22 March 1997
12:38

| England | 30 – 7 | Canada |

Hong Kong Stadium, Hong Kong

22 March 1997
15:20

| Cook Islands | 5 – 0 | Canada |

Hong Kong Stadium, Hong Kong

22 March 1997
18:00

| England | 29 – 10 | Cook Islands |

Hong Kong Stadium, Hong Kong

=== Pool G ===
| Pos | Team | Pld | W | D | L | PF | PA | PD | Pts |
|---|---|---|---|---|---|---|---|---|---|
| 1 | South Korea | 2 | 1 | 1 | 0 | 33 | 22 | +11 | 5 |
| 2 | Spain | 2 | 1 | 1 | 0 | 31 | 24 | +7 | 5 |
| 3 | Zimbabwe | 2 | 0 | 0 | 2 | 22 | 40 | −18 | 2 |

22 March 1997
12:59

| Spain | 12 – 12 | South Korea |

Hong Kong Stadium, Hong Kong

22 March 1997
15:39

| Zimbabwe | 10 – 21 | South Korea |

Hong Kong Stadium, Hong Kong

22 March 1997
18:19

| Spain | 19 – 12 | Zimbabwe |

Hong Kong Stadium, Hong Kong

=== Pool H ===
| Pos | Team | Pld | W | D | L | PF | PA | PD | Pts |
|---|---|---|---|---|---|---|---|---|---|
| 1 | Australia | 2 | 2 | 0 | 0 | 57 | 26 | +31 | 6 |
| 2 | Scotland | 2 | 1 | 0 | 1 | 47 | 38 | +9 | 4 |
| 3 | Portugal | 2 | 0 | 0 | 2 | 14 | 54 | −40 | 2 |

22 March 1997
13:19

| Australia | 26 – 7 | Portugal |

Hong Kong Stadium, Hong Kong

22 March 1997
15:59

| Scotland | 28 – 7 | Portugal |

Hong Kong Stadium, Hong Kong

22 March 1997
18:38

| Australia | 31 – 19 | Scotland |

Hong Kong Stadium, Hong Kong

== Day 3 - Knockout results ==
=== Bowl ===
Quarter-finals
23 May – Hong Kong Stadium, Hong Kong
Japan | 24
Namibia | 22
23 May – Hong Kong Stadium, Hong Kong
Portugal | 5
Ireland | 33
23 May – Hong Kong Stadium, Hong Kong
United States | 24
Canada | 21
23 May – Hong Kong Stadium, Hong Kong
Zimbabwe | 12
Morocco | 19

Semi-finals
23 May – Hong Kong Stadium, Hong Kong
Japan | 24
Ireland | 22
23 May – Hong Kong Stadium, Hong Kong
United States | 24
Morocco | 0

Final
23 May – Hong Kong Stadium, Hong Kong
Japan | 28
United States | 40

==== Quarter-finals ====
23 March 1997
10:00

| Japan | 24 – 22 | Namibia |

Hong Kong Stadium, Hong Kong

23 March 1997
10:22

| Portugal | 5 – 33 | Ireland |

Hong Kong Stadium, Hong Kong

23 March 1997
10:42

| United States | 24 – 21 | Canada |

Hong Kong Stadium, Hong Kong

23 March 1997
11:02

| Zimbabwe | 12 – 19 | Morocco |

Hong Kong Stadium, Hong Kong

==== Semi-finals ====
23 March 1997
14:52

| Japan | 24 – 22 | Ireland |

Hong Kong Stadium, Hong Kong

23 March 1997
15:12

| United States | 24 – 0 | Morocco |

Hong Kong Stadium, Hong Kong

==== Final ====
23 March 1997
16:51

| Japan | 28 – 40 | United States |

Hong Kong Stadium, Hong Kong

=== Plate ===
Quarter-finals
23 May – Hong Kong Stadium, Hong Kong
Spain | 0
Cook Islands | 36
23 May – Hong Kong Stadium, Hong Kong
Wales | 12
Tonga | 26
23 May – Hong Kong Stadium, Hong Kong
Argentina | 2
Hong Kong | 26
23 May – Hong Kong Stadium, Hong Kong
Scotland | 43
Romania | 19

Semi-finals
23 May – Hong Kong Stadium, Hong Kong
Cook Islands | 10
Tonga | 43
23 May – Hong Kong Stadium, Hong Kong
Hong Kong | 43
Scotland | 7

Final
23 May – Hong Kong Stadium, Hong Kong
Tonga | 40
Hong Kong | 19

==== Quarter-finals ====
23 March 1997
11:21

| Spain | 0 – 36 | Cook Islands |

Hong Kong Stadium, Hong Kong

23 March 1997
11:40

| Wales | 12 – 26 | Tonga |

Hong Kong Stadium, Hong Kong

23 March 1997
12:00

| Argentina | 2 – 26 | Hong Kong |

Hong Kong Stadium, Hong Kong

23 March 1997
12:20

| Scotland | 43 – 19 | Romania |

Hong Kong Stadium, Hong Kong

==== Semi-finals ====
23 March 1997
15:30

| Cook Islands | 10 – 43 | Tonga |

Hong Kong Stadium, Hong Kong

23 March 1997
15:51

| Hong Kong | 43 – 7 | Scotland |

Hong Kong Stadium, Hong Kong

==== Final ====
23 March 1997
17:25

| Tonga | 40 – 19 | Hong Kong |

Hong Kong Stadium, Hong Kong

=== Cup ===
Quarter-finals
23 May – Hong Kong Stadium
Fiji | 56
South Korea | 0
23 May – Hong Kong Stadium
England | 5
Western Samoa | 21
23 May – Hong Kong Stadium
South Africa | 19
France | 14
23 May – Hong Kong Stadium
New Zealand | 40
Australia | 12

Semi-finals
23 May – Hong Kong Stadium
Fiji | 38
Western Samoa | 14
23 May – Hong Kong Stadium
South Africa | 31
New Zealand | 7

Final
23 May – Hong Kong Stadium
Fiji | 24
South Africa | 21

==== Quarter-finals ====
23 March 1997
13:33

| Fiji | 56 – 0 | South Korea |

Hong Kong Stadium

23 March 1997
13:54

| England | 5 – 21 | Western Samoa |

Hong Kong Stadium

23 March 1997
14:14

| South Africa | 19 – 14 | France |

Hong Kong Stadium

23 March 1997
14:32

| New Zealand | 40 – 12 | Australia |

Hong Kong Stadium

==== Semi-finals ====
23 March 1997
16:11

| Fiji | 38 – 14 | Western Samoa |

Hong Kong Stadium

23 March 1997
16:32

| South Africa | 31 – 7 | New Zealand |

Hong Kong Stadium

==== Final ====
23 March 1997
18:00

| Fiji | 24 – 21 | South Africa |

Hong Kong Stadium

1997 Rugby World Cup Sevens champions

Fiji
First title

== See also ==
- Rugby World Cup Sevens
- Rugby World Cup
