= 2018 Rugby Europe Under-18 Sevens Championship =

- Host nation: Lithuania
- Date: 5–6 May

Cup
- Champion: France
- Runner-up: Ireland
- Third: Spain

The 2018 Rugby Europe Under-18 Sevens Championship was held in Panevėžys, Lithuania from 5–6 May. France won the championship and qualified for the 2018 Summer Youth Olympics that would be held in Buenos Aires, Argentina. Ireland were runners-up.

== Teams ==
- France
- Germany
- Romania
- Ukraine
- Spain
- Portugal
- Poland
- Luxembourg
- Great Britain
- Georgia
- Belgium
- Lithuania
- Ireland
- Italy
- Russia
- Sweden

== Pool stages ==
Legend
	Qualified for the Cup Quarterfinals
	Qualified for the Challenge Trophy Quarterfinals

=== Pool A ===
Team	P	W	D	L	PF	PA	PD	Pts
Ireland	3	3	0	0	125	15	110	9
Italy	3	2	0	1	63	55	8	7
Russia	3	1	0	2	81	44	37	5
Sweden	3	0	0	3	0	155	-155	3

5 May

Italy	22 - 14	Russia

5 May

Ireland	22 - 10	Russia

5 May

Italy	36 - 0	Sweden

5 May

Ireland	41 - 5	Italy

5 May

Russia	57 - 0	Sweden

5 May

Ireland	62 - 0	Sweden

=== Pool B ===
Team	P	W	D	L	PF	PA	PD	Pts
France	3	3	0	0	142	7	135	9
Germany	3	2	0	1	66	59	7	7
Romania	3	1	0	2	40	95	-55	5
Ukraine	3	0	0	3	19	106	-87	3

5 May

Romania	26 - 5	Ukraine

5 May

Germany	33 - 7	Romania

5 May

Germany	33 - 14	Ukraine

5 May

France	38 - 0	Germany

5 May

France	47 - 0	Ukraine

5 May

France	57 - 7	Romania

=== Pool C ===
Team	P	W	D	L	PF	PA	PD	Pts
Great Britain	3	3	0	0	102	39	63	9
Georgia	3	2	0	1	65	50	15	7
Belgium	3	1	0	2	43	84	-41	5
Lithuania	3	0	0	3	36	73	-37	3

5 May

Georgia	19 - 5	Lithuania

5 May

Belgium	21 - 19	Lithuania

5 May

Georgia	29 - 12	Belgium

5 May

Great Britain	33 - 12	Lithuania

5 May

Great Britain	33 - 17	Georgia

5 May

Great Britain	36 - 10	Belgium

=== Pool D ===
Team	P	W	D	L	PF	PA	PD	Pts
Spain	3	3	0	0	92	29	63	9
Portugal	3	2	0	1	92	52	40	7
Poland	3	1	0	2	67	68	-1	5
Luxembourg	3	0	0	3	26	128	-102	3

5 May

Spain	22 - 17	Poland

5 May

Spain	24 - 5	Portugal

5 May

Poland	29 - 12	Luxembourg

5 May

Portugal	34 - 21	Poland

5 May

Spain	46 - 7	Luxembourg

5 May

Portugal	53 - 7	Luxembourg

== Finals ==
Cup Quarterfinals

Quarter-finals
Germany	21
Great Britain	10
Ireland	24
Portugal	17
Spain	32
Italy	7
France	42
Georgia	0

Semi-finals
Ireland	26
Germany	0
France	41
Spain	5

Cup Final
France	26
Ireland	17
3rd Place
Spain	24
Germany	21

Shield Semifinals

Semi-finals
Italy	24
Georgia	14
Great Britain	35
Portugal	17

Shield Final
Great Britain	17
Italy	14
7th Place
Georgia	15
Portugal	5

Challenge Trophy Quarterfinals

Quarter-finals
Belgium	21
Ukraine	0
Russia	48
Luxembourg	0
Poland	29
Sweden	0
Lithuania	24
Romania	19

Semi-finals
Russia	19
Belgium	5
Poland	29
Lithuania	7

Challenge Trophy Final
Poland	26
Russia	24
11th Place
Lithuania	12
Belgium	10

Ranking Playoffs

Semi-finals
Luxembourg	17
Ukraine	10
Romania	45
Sweden	0

13th Place
Luxembourg	19
Romania	15
15th Place
Sweden	26
Ukraine	7

== Final standings ==
Rank	Team
1st place, gold medalist(s)	France
2nd place, silver medalist(s)	Ireland
3rd place, bronze medalist(s)	Spain
4	Germany
5	Great Britain
6	Italy
7	Georgia
8	Portugal
9	Poland
10	Russia
11	Lithuania
12	Belgium
13	Luxembourg
14	Romania
15	Sweden
16	Ukraine
