= 1993 Rugby World Cup Sevens =

1993 rugby tournament

Tournament details
- Host nation: Scotland
- Dates: 16 April – 18 April 1993
- No. of nations: 24

Final positions
- Champions: England
- Runner-up: Australia

The 1993 Rugby World Cup Sevens was held at Murrayfield in Edinburgh, Scotland, in April 1993. This tournament was the inaugural Rugby World Cup Sevens tournament. The International Rugby Board invited the established rugby union nations but also were keen to involve emerging nations in the event, recognising the fact that Sevens was providing the bridge between the developed rugby nations and those whose rugby union traditions were less well established.

The IRB situated the tournament in the spiritual home nation of rugby sevens, Scotland. The games were played at the home of Scottish rugby, Murrayfield Stadium.

England defeated Australia 21–17 to become the first team to win the Melrose Cup.

== Background ==
Prior to 1993, Rugby Sevens had already built up a substantial international presence. The relative ease with which the rules could be learnt and applied, combined with the ability to quickly organise teams due to fewer players, as well as providing a fast-paced game for spectators enticed many nations to set up domestic tournaments, and appealed to a large international audience outside of the established power houses of the traditional 15-a-side game. Such was the international popularity of the game that the Scottish Rugby Union (SRU) were able to organise a well attended International Tournament in 1973 to celebrate the centenary of the SRU. England came away victorious from that first international event.

Soon after, in early 1975 the Chairman of the Hong Kong Rugby Football Union, A.D.C. "Tokkie" Smith, was talking with tobacco company executive Ian Gow. Gow had been a spectator at the 1973 event and had proposed to Smith to sponsor a Rugby tournament with top teams from throughout the world competing. This gave rise to the inaugural Hong Kong Sevens on 28 March 1976. This tournament grew throughout the 1970s and 1980s in both supporter popularity and the number of participating teams. Sevens was proving to be the bridge between the established international rugby elite and those nations with less resources and less developed professional infrastructures.

In the early 1990s, The SRU made a proposal to the International Rugby Football Board for the creation of a Rugby Sevens World Cup. The World Cup for the 15-a-side game had been staged successfully in 1987 and 1991 and had proved the worth of such an event. The IRB, which had a duty to involve and help to develop the rugby of the new member unions, recognised the value of Sevens to further this end, and their chairman, Vernon Pugh, enthusiastically agreed. Thus, the IRB organised the first officially sanctioned Rugby World Cup Sevens to be held at Murrayfield in April 1993. The ultimate prize of the competition was to be called the Melrose Cup, named after the small Scottish town of Melrose where the Sevens format had been born in 1883. A butchers apprentice and Melrose 20-a-side quarterback, Ned Haig, suggested having a rugby tournament as part of a sports day to raise funds at the end of the rugby season and his boss David Sanderson proposed playing in a tournament that required reduced numbers of players in each team. On 28 April 1883, the Melrose seven-a-side tournament began, with the time of each match limited to 15 minutes. The first World Cup was held 12 days shy of the 110th anniversary of that first tournament.

== Qualification ==
Of the twenty-four nations involved, nineteen were invited and five had to go through pre-tournament qualification. Four of the qualification places were won by Namibia, Hong Kong, Taiwan and Spain who booked their places by reaching the semi-finals of one qualifying event in Sicily. Latvia won their place by beating Russia in the final of a mini-tournament staged in Moscow to decide who would replace the USSR, which had broken up since its invite to the world cup.

The invited participants were Argentina, Australia, Canada, England, Fiji, France, Ireland, Italy, Japan, Netherlands, New Zealand, Romania, Scotland, Tonga, South Africa, South Korea, USA, Wales and Western Samoa.

== Format ==
The Official Programme of the 1993 Rugby World Cup Sevens in Edinburgh showing the flags of the competing nations

The 24 nations were drawn into four pools of six teams with the top two progressing to the Melrose Cup, the third to the Plate and the fourth-placed teams contesting the Bowl competition. The groups were arranged thus:

| Pool A: Fiji; South Africa; Wales; Romania; Japan; Latvia | Pool B: Ireland; New Zealand; France; South Korea; Netherlands; United States | Pool C: Argentina; Australia; Scotland; Tonga; Italy; Taiwan | Pool D: England; Western Samoa; Canada; Spain; Namibia; Hong Kong |

== Summary ==
=== First round ===
As expected, the leading nations all made it through. However, only South Africa, New Zealand and Western Samoa could boast unbeaten records at this stage. Fiji, Australia, Tonga, Ireland and England all lost one match in their respective pools. In Pool A Wales, lost to South Africa but distinguished themselves against the powerhouse of sevens rugby, Fiji, coming back from 21–0 down to lose narrowly 21–17. South Africa managed to overcome Fiji in their pool match. In Pool B Ireland had an excellent first round, beating United States 38–0. They lost to New Zealand, who won the group, but finished second. Korea defeated France 14–0 and the French struggled to beat the Netherlands in an earlier tie. However, the French managed to qualify for the Bowl in fourth place, with the surprise being Korea making the Plate competition in third. In Pool C, the hosts Scotland finished fourth behind Argentina in third (although they ended with the same number of match points as the South Americans and had a better points difference they had lost to the Argentinians). The Scots managed to beat eventual group winners Tonga but lost to Australia and Argentina. Both Tonga and Australia lost one match each, and crucially Tonga beat the decider between the two sides meaning that Australia ended second in that group. In Pool D, eventual tournament winners England progressed well but were beaten by the Samoans but 28–10. Samoa went on to win the pool. Despite heavy defeats to England and Samoa, Spain managed to gain third spot just ahead of Canada.

=== Quarterfinals ===
The quarterfinals were not knockout but took the form of another round robin with the teams split into two groups. Fiji emerged as the only nation with an unbeaten record after overcoming Ireland, Tonga and Western Samoa in the first. The second group was more fiercely contested with each nation claiming at least one victory. Australia and England who progressed to the semifinals despite their respective defeats by New Zealand and Australia. England had assumed they would top their group and avoid Fiji, even with a defeat to Australia in the final pool game. They opted to rest some first team players but expressed dismay in finding themselves placed second in the group behind Australia. The England team had thought that table placings in the event of a tied points tally were decided on tries scored. However, tournament rules stated that the first differentiator was results between the tied teams.

=== Cup semifinals and finals ===
Although England lost to Australia in the quarters, they qualified for the semifinals against the favourites, Fiji. Dave Scully produced what was awarded the "Moment of the Tournament" prize with a tackle on Mesake Rasari that turned a certain Fiji try into an England score. England won 21–7. In the other semifinal Ireland were narrowly beaten 21–19 by the Australians, setting up a final between teams that had already met in the quarterfinal pools.

The final was contested by England and Australia. Just before half time, England led 21–0 through tries from Andrew Harriman, Lawrence Dallaglio and Tim Rodber, all converted by Nick Beal. Michael Lynagh scored a try before half time, but failed to convert his own try. In the second half Australia hit back strongly and first David Campese and then Semi Taupeaafe scored further tries, the latter also converted by Michael Lynagh. However, time ran out on the Australians and it was England captain "Prince" Andrew Harriman who was presented with the Melrose Cup by the Princess Royal. Adedayo Adebayo, a member of that victorious side later recalled how surprising the victory had been to the players involved in it. He said "We were basically a scratch side. We got together for the first time as a team the week before, played one practice match and went on to win! But there were a lot of quality players in that side and looking back that's why we were able to wing it slightly – the talent came through. Looking back though we had no expectations of winning at the start. We didn't know how far we would go. It just happened."

=== Plate and Bowl ===
In the Plate competition, Spain stunned Wales, winning 10–7. Argentina dominated South Korea and came through 24–0. They went on to win the final 19–12 against Spain.

Of the four teams contesting the Bowl, Scotland and France met in the semi-final. Scotland overcame the lacklustre French side 14–7, and Japan posted 14 points to Canada's nil to reach the final. Japan beat the hosts in the final winning 33–19. Princess Anne awarded the prizes and Scotland received tankards.

== Group stage ==
Source for the results below: www.imgmediaarchive.com

Key to colours in group tables
Teams that progressed to the Quarter Final Groups (also indicated in **bold type**)
Team that progressed to the Plate competition (also indicated in **bold italics**)
Team that progressed to the Bowl competition (also indicated in plain italics)

All times British time (UTC+1)

=== Pool A ===
| Team | Pld | W | D | L | PF | PA | +/- | Pts |
|---|---|---|---|---|---|---|---|---|
| **South Africa** | **5** | **5** | **0** | **0** | **175** | **43** | **132** | **15** |
| **Fiji** | **5** | **4** | **0** | **1** | **150** | **60** | **90** | **13** |
| **Wales** | **5** | **3** | **0** | **2** | **135** | **78** | **57** | **11** |
| Japan | 5 | 2 | 0 | 3 | 67 | 118 | -51 | 9 |
| Romania | 5 | 1 | 0 | 4 | 44 | 133 | −89 | 7 |
| Latvia | 5 | 0 | 0 | 5 | 29 | 168 | −139 | 5 |

16 April 1993
Time:10:00

| **Fiji** | **42–0** | **Latvia** |

Murrayfield Stadium, Edinburgh

16 April 1993
Time:10:18

| **South Africa** | **28–5** | **Japan** |

Murrayfield Stadium, Edinburgh

16 April 1993
Time:10:34

| **Wales** | **33–7** | **Romania** |

Murrayfield Stadium, Edinburgh

16 April 1993
Time:11:45

| **Fiji** | **28–17** | **Japan** |

Murrayfield Stadium, Edinburgh

16 April 1993
Time:12:02

| **Romania** | **22–5** | **Latvia** |

Murrayfield Stadium, Edinburgh

16 April 1993
Time:12:20

| **South Africa** | **36–14** | **Wales** |

Murrayfield Stadium, Edinburgh

16 April 1993
Time:13:28

| **Fiji** | **40–0** | **Romania** |

Murrayfield Stadium, Edinburgh

16 April 1993
Time:13:44

| **Wales** | **35–7** | **Japan** |

Murrayfield Stadium, Edinburgh

16 April 1993
Time:14:00

| **South Africa** | **47–5** | **Latvia** |

Murrayfield Stadium, Edinburgh

17 April 1993
Time:15:05

| **Fiji** | **21–17** | **Wales** |

Murrayfield Stadium, Edinburgh

17 April 1993
Time:15:25

| **South Africa** | **38–0** | **Romania** |

Murrayfield Stadium, Edinburgh

17 April 1993
Time:15:41

| **Japan** | **21–12** | **Latvia** |

Murrayfield Stadium, Edinburgh

17 April 1993
Time:16:49

| **Fiji** | **19–26** | **South Africa** |

Murrayfield Stadium, Edinburgh

17 April 1993
Time:17:04

| **Wales** | **36–7** | **Latvia** |

Murrayfield Stadium, Edinburgh

17 April 1993
Time:17:20

| **Romania** | **15–17** | **Japan** |

Murrayfield Stadium, Edinburgh

=== Pool B ===
| Team | Pld | W | D | L | PF | PA | +/- | Pts |
|---|---|---|---|---|---|---|---|---|
| **New Zealand** | **5** | **5** | **0** | **0** | **157** | **24** | **+133** | **15** |
| **Ireland** | **5** | **4** | **0** | **1** | **128** | **45** | **+83** | **13** |
| **South Korea** | **5** | **3** | **0** | **2** | **80** | **98** | **–18** | **11** |
| France | 5 | 2 | 0 | 3 | 62 | 71 | –9 | 9 |
| United States | 5 | 1 | 0 | 4 | 62 | 105 | −43 | 7 |
| Netherlands | 5 | 0 | 0 | 5 | 33 | 179 | −146 | 5 |

16 April 1993
Time:10:53

| **New Zealand** | **49–7** | **Netherlands** |

Murrayfield Stadium, Edinburgh

16 April 1993
Time:11:10

| **France** | **22–7** | **United States** |

Murrayfield Stadium, Edinburgh

16 April 1993
Time:11:28

| **Ireland** | **21–12** | **South Korea** |

Murrayfield Stadium, Edinburgh

16 April 1993
Time:12:36

| **New Zealand** | **19–5** | **United States** |

Murrayfield Stadium, Edinburgh

16 April 1993
Time:12:53

| **South Korea** | **28–12** | **Netherlands** |

Murrayfield Stadium, Edinburgh

16 April 1993
Time:13:12

| **Ireland** | **17–9** | **France** |

Murrayfield Stadium, Edinburgh

17 April 1993
Time:14:12

| **New Zealand** | **46–0** | **South Korea** |

Murrayfield Stadium, Edinburgh

17 April 1993
Time:14:30

| **Ireland** | **38–0** | **United States** |

Murrayfield Stadium, Edinburgh

17 April 1993
Time:14:47

| **France** | **26–14** | **Netherlands** |

Murrayfield Stadium, Edinburgh

17 April 1993
Time:15:58

| **Ireland** | **7–24** | **New Zealand** |

Murrayfield Stadium, Edinburgh

17 April 1993
Time:16:15

| **France** | **0–14** | **South Korea** |

Murrayfield Stadium, Edinburgh

17 April 1993
Time:16:32

| **Netherlands** | **0–31** | **United States** |

Murrayfield Stadium, Edinburgh

17 April 1993
Time:17:38

| **Ireland** | **45–0** | **Netherlands** |

Murrayfield Stadium, Edinburgh

17 April 1993
Time:17:55

| **New Zealand** | **19–5** | **France** |

Murrayfield Stadium, Edinburgh

17 April 1993
Time:18:12

| **South Korea** | **26–19** | **United States** |

Murrayfield Stadium, Edinburgh

=== Pool C ===
| Team | Pld | W | D | L | PF | PA | +/- | Pts |
|---|---|---|---|---|---|---|---|---|
| **Tonga** | **5** | **4** | **0** | **1** | **117** | **34** | **83** | **13** |
| **Australia** | **5** | **4** | **0** | **1** | **143** | **29** | **114** | **13** |
| **Argentina** | **5** | **3** | **0** | **2** | **67** | **81** | **-14** | **11** |
| Scotland | 5 | 3 | 0 | 2 | 96 | 64 | 32 | 11 |
| Italy | 5 | 1 | 0 | 4 | 41 | 123 | −82 | 7 |
| Taiwan | 5 | 0 | 0 | 5 | 24 | 157 | −133 | 5 |

16 April 1993
Time:14:17

| **Australia** | **28–0** | **Taiwan** |

Murrayfield Stadium, Edinburgh

16 April 1993
Time:14:33

| **Scotland** | **15–7** | **Tonga** |

Murrayfield Stadium, Edinburgh

16 April 1993
Time:14:50

| **Argentina** | **17–7** | **Italy** |

Murrayfield Stadium, Edinburgh

16 April 1993
Time:16:00

| **Australia** | **7–10** | **Tonga** |

Murrayfield Stadium, Edinburgh

16 April 1993
Time:16:17

| **Italy** | **15–14** | **Taiwan** |

Murrayfield Stadium, Edinburgh

16 April 1993
Time:16:34

| **Argentina** | **14–10** | **Scotland** |

Murrayfield Stadium, Edinburgh

16 April 1993
Time:17:44

| **Australia** | **40–0** | **Italy** |

Murrayfield Stadium, Edinburgh

16 April 1993
Time:18:02

| **Argentina** | **5–17** | **Tonga** |

Murrayfield Stadium, Edinburgh

16 April 1993
Time:18:21

| **Scotland** | **36–5** | **Taiwan** |

Murrayfield Stadium, Edinburgh

17 April 1993
Time:10:51

| **Argentina** | **5–42** | **Australia** |

Murrayfield Stadium, Edinburgh

17 April 1993
Time:11:08

| **Scotland** | **21–12** | **Italy** |

Murrayfield Stadium, Edinburgh

17 April 1993
Time:11:26

| **Tonga** | **52–0** | **Taiwan** |

Murrayfield Stadium, Edinburgh

17 April 1993
Time:12:31

| **Australia** | **26–14** | **Scotland** |

Murrayfield Stadium, Edinburgh

17 April 1993
Time:12:47

| **Argentina** | **26–5** | **Taiwan** |

Murrayfield Stadium, Edinburgh

17 April 1993
Time:13:05

| **Tonga** | **31–7** | **Italy** |

Murrayfield Stadium, Edinburgh

=== Pool D ===
| Team | Pld | W | D | L | PF | PA | +/- | Pts |
|---|---|---|---|---|---|---|---|---|
| **Samoa** | **5** | **5** | **0** | **0** | **193** | **31** | **162** | **15** |
| **England** | **5** | **4** | **0** | **1** | **138** | **38** | **100** | **13** |
| **Spain** | **5** | **2** | **0** | **3** | **59** | **114** | **–55** | **9** |
| Canada | 5 | 2 | 0 | 3 | 75 | 87 | –12 | 9 |
| Hong Kong | 5 | 1 | 0 | 4 | 43 | 161 | −118 | 7 |
| Namibia | 5 | 1 | 0 | 4 | 55 | 132 | −77 | 7 |

16 April 1993
Time:15:08

| **England** | **40–5** | **Hong Kong** |

Murrayfield Stadium, Edinburgh

16 April 1993
Time:15:27

| **Western Samoa** | **47–0** | **Spain** |

Murrayfield Stadium, Edinburgh

16 April 1993
Time:15:44

| **Canada** | **21–7** | **Namibia** |

Murrayfield Stadium, Edinburgh

16 April 1993
Time:16:51

| **England** | **31–0** | **Spain** |

Murrayfield Stadium, Edinburgh

16 April 1993
Time:17:09

| **Namibia** | **17–19** | **Hong Kong** |

Murrayfield Stadium, Edinburgh

16 April 1993
Time:17:26

| **Western Samoa** | **28–14** | **Canada** |

Murrayfield Stadium, Edinburgh

17 April 1993
Time:10:00

| **England** | **24–5** | **Namibia** |

Murrayfield Stadium, Edinburgh

17 April 1993
Time:10:17

| **Canada** | **5–12** | **Spain** |

Murrayfield Stadium, Edinburgh

17 April 1993
Time:10:34

| **Western Samoa** | **43–7** | **Hong Kong** |

Murrayfield Stadium, Edinburgh

17 April 1993
Time:11:43

| **England** | **33–0** | **Canada** |

Murrayfield Stadium, Edinburgh

17 April 1993
Time:11:59

| **Spain** | **26–5** | **Hong Kong** |

Murrayfield Stadium, Edinburgh

17 April 1993
Time:12:16

| **Western Samoa** | **47–0** | **Namibia** |

Murrayfield Stadium, Edinburgh

17 April 1993
Time:13:22

| **England** | **10–28** | **Western Samoa** |

Murrayfield Stadium, Edinburgh

17 April 1993
Time:13:39

| **Canada** | **35–7** | **Hong Kong** |

Murrayfield Stadium, Edinburgh

17 April 1993
Time:13:56

| **Spain** | **21–26** | **Namibia** |

Murrayfield Stadium, Edinburgh

== Knockout stage ==
=== Bowl ===
Semi-finals
France | 7
Scotland | 14
Japan | 14
Canada | 0

Final
Scotland | 19
Japan | 33

==== Bowl Semifinals ====
18 April 1993
Time:13:17

| Scotland | 14–7 | France |
| Tries:Hogg-c; Kerr-c; Con:Appleson (2) | | Tries:Faugeron-c Con:Bodeval |

Murrayfield Stadium, Edinburgh

18 April 1993
Time:13:33

| Japan | 14–0 | Canada |
| Tries:Ono-c; Motoki-c; Con:Nagatomo (2) |

Murrayfield Stadium, Edinburgh

==== Bowl Final ====
18 April 1993
Time:15:05

| Scotland | 19–33 (HT:5 – 21) | Japan |
| Tries:Kerr-m; Moncrief-c; Corcoran-c Con:Appleson (2) | | Tries:Nawalu-c; Kato-c; Yoshida-c; Ono-c; Nagatomo-m; Con:Ono (1); Nagatomo (1); Yoshida (1); Nagatomo (1) |

Murrayfield Stadium, Edinburgh

=== Plate ===
Semi-finals
Wales | 7
Spain | 10
Argentina | 24
South Korea | 0

Final
Spain | 12
Argentina | 19

==== Plate Semifinals ====
18 April 1993
Time:13:50

| Wales | 7–10 | Spain |
| Tries:Jenkins-c Con:Williams | | Tries:Rivero-m; Gutierrez-m |

Murrayfield Stadium, Edinburgh

18 April 1993
Time:14:06

| Argentina | 24–0 | South Korea |
| Tries:Baraldi-c; Baraldi-c; Arbizu-c; Con:Meson (3); Pen:Meson |

Murrayfield Stadium, Edinburgh

==== Plate Final ====
18 April 1993
Time:15:34

| Argentina | 19–12 (HT:7 – 7) | Spain |
| Tries:Meson-c; Jorge-c; Jorge-m; Con:Meson (2) | | Tries:Diaz-c; Azkargorta-m Con:Puertas (3) |

Murrayfield Stadium, Edinburgh

=== Melrose Cup ===
==== Quarterfinal pools ====
===== Pool E =====
| Team | Pld | W | D | L | PF | PA | +/- | Pts |
|---|---|---|---|---|---|---|---|---|
| Fiji | 3 | 3 | 0 | 0 | 66 | 26 | 40 | 9 |
| Ireland | 3 | 2 | 0 | 1 | 38 | 43 | -5 | 7 |
| Samoa | 3 | 1 | 0 | 2 | 54 | 38 | 16 | 5 |
| Tonga | 3 | 0 | 0 | 3 | 26 | 77 | −51 | 3 |

18 April 1993
Time:10:00

| Western Samoa | 0–17 | Ireland |

Murrayfield Stadium, Edinburgh

18 April 1993
Time:10:16

| Tonga | 7–21 | Fiji |

Murrayfield Stadium, Edinburgh

18 April 1993
Time:11:04

| Fiji | 14–12 | Western Samoa |

Murrayfield Stadium, Edinburgh

18 April 1993
Time:11:20

| Tonga | 12–14 | Ireland |

Murrayfield Stadium, Edinburgh

18 April 1993
Time:12:09

| Tonga | 7–42 | Western Samoa |

Murrayfield Stadium, Edinburgh

18 April 1993
Time:12:26

| Fiji | 31–7 | Ireland |

Murrayfield Stadium, Edinburgh

===== Pool F =====
| Team | Pld | W | D | L | PF | PA | +/- | Pts |
|---|---|---|---|---|---|---|---|---|
| Australia | 3 | 2 | 0 | 1 | 28 | 59 | -31 | 7 |
| England | 3 | 2 | 0 | 1 | 47 | 40 | 7 | 7 |
| South Africa | 3 | 1 | 0 | 2 | 43 | 35 | 8 | 5 |
| New Zealand | 3 | 1 | 0 | 2 | 68 | 52 | 16 | 5 |

18 April 1993
Time:10:33

| South Africa | 5–7 | Australia |

Murrayfield Stadium, Edinburgh

18 April 1993
Time:10:49

| England | 21–12 | New Zealand |

Murrayfield Stadium, Edinburgh

18 April 1993
Time:11:36

| South Africa | 7–14 | England |

Murrayfield Stadium, Edinburgh

18 April 1993
Time:11:53

| New Zealand | 42–0 | Australia |

Murrayfield Stadium, Edinburgh

18 April 1993
Time:12:43

| South Africa | 31–14 | New Zealand |

Murrayfield Stadium, Edinburgh

18 April 1993
Time:13:00

| Australia | 21–12 | England |

Murrayfield Stadium, Edinburgh

==== Knockout rounds ====
Semi-finals
Ireland | 19
Australia | 21
England | 21
Fiji | 7

Final
Australia | 17
England | 21

===== Semifinals =====
18 April 1993
Time:14:31

| Fiji | 7–21 | England |
| Tries:Seru-c Con:Serevi | | Tries:Harriman-c; Dallaglio-c; Harriman-c; Con:Beal (3) |

Murrayfield Stadium, Edinburgh

18 April 1993
Time:14:48

| Australia | 21–19 | Ireland |
| Tries: Taupeaafe-c; Taupeaafe-c; Ofahengaue-c; Con: Lynagh (3) | | Tries: Wallace-c; Cunningham-c; McBride-m; Con: Elwood (2) |

Murrayfield Stadium, Edinburgh

===== Final =====
18 April 1993
Time:16:12

| Australia | 17–21 (HT:5 – 21) | England |
| Tries:Lynagh-m; Campese-m; Taupeaafe-c; Con:Lynagh (1) | | Tries:Harriman-c; Dallaglio-c; Rodber-c; Con:Beal (3) |

Murrayfield Stadium, Edinburgh
Referee: Patrick Robin (France)

1993 Rugby World Cup Sevens champions

England
First title

== See also ==
- Rugby World Cup Sevens
- Rugby World Cup
