= Latvia national rugby sevens team =

Latvia
- Union: Latvian Rugby Federation
- Head coach: (Wales) Jean Baptiste Bruzulier
- Captain: Elmārs Šefanovskis
- Home stadium: Daugava Stadium; Baldone Stadium; Zemgale Olympic Center
| First colours | Second colours |

Rugby World Cup Sevens
- Appearances: 1 (first in 1993)
- Best result: Group stage (1993)
- Website: rugby-latvia.lv

The Latvia national rugby sevens team (Latvian: Latvijas regbijs-7 izlase) is a national rugby sevens side, representing Latvia. They currently play in the Rugby Europe Sevens Trophy tournament.

Latvian rugby received a surprise boost when they qualified for the Rugby World Cup Sevens in 1993. At the time, there were only two pitches in the country, both of which spent much of their time under snow.

== Tournament history ==
=== Rugby World Cup Sevens ===
Rugby World Cup Sevens Record
| Year | Round | Position | Pld | W | L | D |
|---|---|---|---|---|---|---|
| (Scotland) 1993 | Group Stage | 21st | 5 | 0 | 5 | 0 |
| (Hong Kong) 1997 | Did not qualify | | | | | |
| (Argentina) 2001 | Did not qualify | | | | | |
| (Hong Kong) 2005 | Not eligible | | | | | |
| (United Arab Emirates) 2009 | Not eligible | | | | | |
| (Russia) 2013 | Not eligible | | | | | |
| (United States) 2018 | Not eligible | | | | | |
| (South Africa) 2022 | Not eligible | | | | | |
| Total | 0 Titles | 1/7 | 5 | 0 | 5 | 0 |

=== 1993 World Cup Sevens: Pool A ===
| Team | Pld | W | D | L | PF | PA | +/- | Pts |
|---|---|---|---|---|---|---|---|---|
| South Africa | 5 | 5 | 0 | 0 | 175 | 43 | 132 | 15 |
| Fiji | 5 | 4 | 0 | 1 | 150 | 60 | 90 | 13 |
| Wales | 5 | 3 | 0 | 2 | 135 | 78 | 57 | 11 |
| Japan | 5 | 2 | 0 | 3 | 67 | 118 | -51 | 9 |
| Romania | 5 | 1 | 0 | 4 | 44 | 133 | -89 | 7 |
| Latvia | 5 | 0 | 0 | 5 | 29 | 168 | -139 | 5 |

=== Results ===
| Time/Date | Match Result | Venue |
| 16 Apr 1993; Time:10:00 | Fiji 42-0 Latvia | Murrayfield Stadium, Edinburgh |
| 16 Apr 1993; Time:12:02 | Romania 22-5 Latvia | Murrayfield Stadium, Edinburgh |
| 16 Apr 1993; Time:14:00 | South Africa 47-5 Latvia | Murrayfield Stadium, Edinburgh |
| 17 Apr 1993; Time:15:41 | Japan 21-12 Latvia | Murrayfield Stadium, Edinburgh |
| 17 Apr 1993; Time:17:04 | Wales 36-7 Latvia | Murrayfield Stadium, Edinburgh |
