= Romania national rugby sevens team =

Romania
- Union: Romanian Rugby Federation
- Nickname: Stejarii (The Oaks)
- Emblem: Oak Leaf
- Coach: Daniel Carpo
- Captain: Marius Chiriac
| Team kit | Change kit |

World Cup
- Appearances: 2 (first in 1993)
- Best result: (13th place) (1997)

The Romania national rugby sevens team has competed in the World Rugby Sevens Series and in the Rugby World Cup Sevens, but not yet in the Summer Olympic Games. They are currently competing in the Rugby Europe Sevens Trophy Series.

== Tournament history ==
=== Summer Olympics ===
Olympic Games
| Year | Round | Position | Pld | W | L | D |
|---|---|---|---|---|---|---|
| (Brazil) 2016 | Did not qualify | | | | | |
| Total | 0 Titles | 0/1 | - | - | - | - |

=== Rugby World Cup Sevens ===
World Cup record
| Year | Round | Position | Pld | W | L | D |
|---|---|---|---|---|---|---|
| (Scotland) 1993 | Group stage | 17th | 5 | 1 | 4 | 0 |
| (Hong Kong) 1997 | Plate Quarterfinals | 13st | 5 | 1 | 4 | 0 |
| (Argentina) 2001 | Did not qualify | | | | | |
| (Hong Kong) 2005 | Did not qualify | | | | | |
| (United Arab Emirates) 2009 | Did not qualify | | | | | |
| (Russia) 2013 | Did not qualify | | | | | |
| (United States) 2018 | Did not enter | | | | | |
| Total | 0 Titles | 2/7 | 10 | 2 | 8 | 0 |

== Recent Results ==
=== 2018 European Sevens Trophy ===
Zagreb

==== Pool B ====
Legend
Teams that advance to Cup Quarterfinal
Teams that advance to Challenge Trophy Semifinal

| Team | Pld | W | D | L | PF | PA | PD | Pts |
|---|---|---|---|---|---|---|---|---|
| Romania | 3 | 2 | 1 | 0 | 86 | 17 | +69 | 7 |
| Lithuania | 3 | 2 | 1 | 0 | 83 | 31 | +52 | 7 |
| Hungary | 3 | 1 | 0 | 2 | 26 | 57 | –31 | 5 |
| Cyprus | 3 | 0 | 0 | 3 | 19 | 109 | –90 | 3 |

7 June 2018
11:44

| Romania | 24–0 | Hungary |

7 June 2018
12:06

| Lithuania | 45–7 | Cyprus |

7 June 2018
14:29

| Romania | 45–0 | Cyprus |

7 June 2018
14:51

| Lithuania | 21–7 | Hungary |

7 June 2018
17:14

| Cyprus | 12–19 | Hungary |

7 June 2018
17:36

| Romania | 17–17 | Lithuania |

Knockout stage

==== Cup ====
Quarter-finals
9 June 2018 – 10:00
Belgium | 26
Croatia | 7
9 June 2018 – 11:06
Lithuania | 17
Ukraine | 7
9 June 2018 – 10:22
Romania | 27
Luxembourg | 14
9 June 2018 – 10:44
Denmark | 7
Israel | 10

Semi-finals
9 June 2018 – 13:59
Belgium | 7
Lithuania | 17
9 June 2018 – 14:21
Romania | 26
Israel | 12

Final
9 June 2018 – 18:15
Lithuania | 26
Romania | 31
Third place
9 June 2018 – 17:14
Belgium | 22
Israel | 7

Šiauliai

==== Pool A ====
Legend
Teams that advance to Cup Quarterfinal
Teams that advance to Challenge Trophy Semifinal

| Team | Pld | W | D | L | PF | PA | PD | Pts |
|---|---|---|---|---|---|---|---|---|
| Luxembourg | 3 | 1 | 2 | 0 | 46 | 44 | +2 | 7 |
| Romania | 3 | 2 | 0 | 1 | 93 | 24 | +69 | 7 |
| Latvia | 3 | 1 | 1 | 1 | 53 | 55 | –2 | 6 |
| Ukraine | 3 | 0 | 1 | 2 | 5 | 74 | –69 | 4 |

30 June 2018
9:00

| Romania | 38–0 | Latvia |

30 June 2018
9:22

| Ukraine | 5–5 | Luxembourg |

30 June 2018
11:45

| Romania | 22–24 | Luxembourg |

30 June 2018
12:07

| Ukraine | 0–36 | Latvia |

30 June 2018
14:30

| Romania | 33–0 | Ukraine |

30 June 2018
14:52

| Luxembourg | 17–17 | Latvia |

Knockout stage

==== Cup ====
Quarter-finals
1 July 2018 – 9:00
Luxembourg | 0
Denmark | 34
1 July 2018 – 10:06
Croatia | 14
Belgium | 17
1 July 2018 – 9:22
Lithuania | 12
Latvia | 14
1 July 2018 – 9:44
Israel | 10
Romania | 17

Semi-finals
1 July 2018 – 12:59
Denmark | 7
Belgium | 14
1 July 2018 – 13:21
Latvia | 0
Romania | 40

Final
1 July 2018 – 15:52
Belgium | 5
Romania | 35
Third place
1 July 2018 – 16:14
Denmark | 10
Latvia | 38

==== Standings ====
Legend
Promoted to the 2019 Grand Prix Series
Relegated to 2019 Rugby Europe Conference

| Rank | Team | Zagreb | Šiauliai | Points |
|---|---|---|---|---|
| 1st place, gold medalist(s) | Romania | 20 | 20 | 40 |
| 2nd place, silver medalist(s) | Belgium | 16 | 18 | 34 |
| 3rd place, bronze medalist(s) | Lithuania | 18 | 12 | 30 |
| 4 | Denmark | 12 | 14 | 26 |
| 5 | Israel | 14 | 8 | 22 |
| 6 | Luxembourg | 8 | 10 | 18 |
| 7 | Latvia | 1 | 16 | 17 |
| 8 | Ukraine | 10 | 3 | 13 |
| 9 | Croatia | 6 | 6 | 12 |
| 10 | Bulgaria | 4 | 2 | 6 |
| 11 | Hungary | 2 | 4 | 6 |
| 12 | Cyprus | 3 | 1 | 4 |

=== 2019 European Sevens Grand Prix ===
Moscow

==== Pool A ====
Legend
Teams that advance to Cup Quarterfinal
Teams that advance to Bowl Semifinal

| Team | Pld | W | D | L | PF | PA | PD | Pts |
|---|---|---|---|---|---|---|---|---|
| France | 3 | 3 | 0 | 0 | 97 | 33 | +64 | 9 |
| Ireland | 3 | 2 | 0 | 1 | 69 | 52 | +17 | 7 |
| Italy | 3 | 1 | 0 | 2 | 45 | 66 | –21 | 5 |
| Romania | 3 | 0 | 0 | 3 | 19 | 79 | –60 | 3 |

22 June 2019
11:00

| Ireland | 29–0 | Romania |

Referee: Finlay Brown (Scotland)

22 June 2019
11:22

| France | 33–7 | Italy |

Referee: Georgii Kopp (Russia)

22 June 2019
13:45

| Ireland | 26–14 | Italy |

Referee: Jérémy Rozier (France)

22 June 2019
14:07

| France | 26–12 | Romania |

Referee: Andrea Spadoni (Italy)

22 June 2019
16:30

| Ireland | 14–38 | France |

Referee: Paulo Duarte (Portugal)

22 June 2019
16:52

| Italy | 24–7 | Romania |

Referee: George Selwood (England)

Knockout stage

==== Bowl ====
Semi-finals
23 June 2019 – 12:28
Russia | 34
Poland | 17
23 June 2019 – 12:50
Romania | 19
Georgia | 24

Final
23 June 2019 – 16:05
Russia | 14
Georgia | 0
Third place
23 June 2019 – 15:43
Poland | 21
Romania | 19

Łódź

==== Pool A ====
Legend
Teams that advance to Cup Quarterfinal
Teams that advance to Bowl Semifinal

| Team | Pld | W | D | L | PF | PA | PD | Pts |
|---|---|---|---|---|---|---|---|---|
| Spain | 3 | 3 | 0 | 0 | 69 | 45 | +24 | 9 |
| France | 3 | 2 | 0 | 1 | 64 | 59 | +5 | 7 |
| Portugal | 3 | 1 | 0 | 2 | 71 | 57 | +14 | 5 |
| Romania | 3 | 0 | 0 | 3 | 40 | 83 | –43 | 3 |

20 July 2019
11:00

| Spain | 26–19 | Portugal |

Referee: Finlay Brown (Scotland)

20 July 2019
11:22

| France | 26–21 | Romania |

Referee: Paulo Duarte (Portugal)

20 July 2019
13:45

| France | 24–14 | Portugal |

Referee: Inigo Atorrasagasti (Spain)

20 July 2019
14:07

| Spain | 19–12 | Romania |

Referee: Thibault Santamaria (France)

20 July 2019
16:30

| France | 14–24 | Spain |

Referee: Adam Jones (Wales)

20 July 2019
16:52

| Portugal | 38–7 | Romania |

Referee: George Kopp (Russia)

Knockout stage

==== Bowl ====
Semi-finals
21 July 2019 – 12:28
England | 26
Poland | 17
21 July 2019 – 12:50
Russia | 19
Romania | 0

Final
21 July 2019 – 16:40
England | 12
Russia | 21
Third place
21 July 2019 – 16:18
Poland | 26
Romania | 12

==== Standings ====
Legend
Champions
Relegated to 2020 Rugby Europe Sevens Trophy

| Rank | Team | Moscow | Łódź | Points |
|---|---|---|---|---|
| 1st place, gold medalist(s) | Germany | 14 | 20 | 34 |
| 2nd place, silver medalist(s) | France | 20 | 12 | 32 |
| 3rd place, bronze medalist(s) | Ireland | 18 | 14 | 32 |
| 4 | Spain | 10 | 18 | 28 |
| 5 | Italy | 6 | 16 | 22 |
| 6 | Wales | 12 | 10 | 22 |
| 7 | England | 16 | 3 | 19 |
| 8 | Portugal | 8 | 8 | 16 |
| 9 | Georgia | 3 | 6 | 9 |
| 10 | Russia | 4 | 4 | 8 |
| 11 | Poland | 2 | 2 | 4 |
| 12 | Romania | 1 | 1 | 2 |

== Players ==
=== Current squad ===
The following 12 players were called up for the 2021 Rugby Europe Sevens Trophy Series on 9 July 2021.

| Player | Date of birth (age) | Club/province |
|---|---|---|
| Alexandre Crețu | 4 May 2000 (age 25) | (France) Carcassonne Espoirs |
| Alexander Dinu | 19 November 2001 (age 24) | (France) Massy Espoirs |
| Andrei Homiuc | 9 October 1998 (age 27) | (Romania) Grivița București |
| Codrin Bercu | 27 January 1998 (age 27) | (Romania) Năvodari |
| Silviu Mircea | 2 April 2001 (age 24) | (Romania) Grivița București |
| Marius Chiriac (c) | 7 March 1998 (age 27) | (Romania) Dinamo București |
| Alexandru Tudose | 23 December 1998 (age 27) | (Romania) Dinamo București |
| Cristian Zamfir | 26 June 2000 (age 25) | (Romania) Ştiinţa Petroșani |
| David Jilăveanu | 2 April 2002 (age 23) | (Romania) Dinamo București |
| Ovidiu Neagu | 30 July 2001 (age 24) | (Romania) Bârlad |
| Lama Sioeli | 12 October 1995 (age 30) | (Romania) Steaua București |
| Julien Bartoli | 21 September 1999 (age 26) | (France) Hyères |

== Coaches ==
=== Current coaching staff ===
The current coaching staff of the Romanian national sevens team:

| Name | Nationality | Role |
|---|---|---|
| Marius Raczek | ROU | Head coach |
| Alexandru Marin Jr. | ROU | Assistant coach |
| Dr. Ilie Vlad | ROU | Team doctor |

== See also ==
- Rugby union in Romania
- Romania national rugby union team
- Romania national under-20 rugby union team
- Romania women's national rugby sevens team
