= Rugby Europe Sevens =

Series of rugby sevens tournaments

- Current season, competition or edition: 2026 Rugby Europe Sevens Championship Series
- Sport: Rugby sevens
- Founded: 2002; 24 years ago
- No. of teams: 12 (Championship)
- Country: European
- Most recent champion: France (5th title)
- Most titles: Portugal (8 titles)

The Rugby Europe Sevens are a series of rugby sevens tournaments held by Rugby Europe. It was formerly known as the FIRA-AER Sevens until 2013, and the Sevens Grand Prix Series until 2021. Only one annual tournament existed prior to 2011, when Rugby Europe created a series of tournaments, following the model of the World Rugby Sevens Series. The main division is known as the Rugby Europe Championship Series, formerly known the Grand Prix, followed by the Trophy Series, Conference 1, and Conference 2. The competitions use a promotion/relegation system.

== Format ==
In the Championship Series, twelve teams play in at least two tournaments each summer throughout Europe. Each tournament spans two to three days — the first day is a pool phase, the second day is a pool and knockout phase, and the third day a knockout phase. During the pool phase, the teams are divided into three pools of four teams each. After the pool phase, the top eight teams (two first of each pool, plus two best-performing third place teams) advance to the Cup tournament; the other four teams play for the Challenge Trophy.

At the end of each tournament, teams are awarded points based on their performance. At the end of the series, the team with the most points is declared the champion. The team with the fewest points is relegated from the Championship Series to the Trophy competition, whereas the champion of the Trophy competition is promoted to next season's Championship Series.

== History ==
=== 2002–2010 ===
A number of qualifying tournaments lead up to a finals tournament, which functions as the European championship and, in 2008, also as the qualifying stage for the Sevens World Cup.

Portugal won the first European Championship held in Heidelberg in 2002. Portugal would go onto win eight out of the first ten tournaments. In 2003, Heidelberg again held the tournament. In 2004 Palma de Mallorca was the host. From 2005 to 2007, Moscow hosted the tournament. Hanover held the tournament for the first time in 2008 and did so again in 2009. In 2010, the tournament returned to Moscow.

=== 2011–present ===
In 2011, the format of the competition changed. The twelve best teams now meet over the course of several tournaments, following the model of the IRB Sevens World Series. The name also changed from the European Championship to the Sevens Grand Prix Series. The first edition of this competition was held in 2011 and won by Portugal. In 2021 the competition changed its name from the Sevens Grand Prix to the Rugby Europe Sevens Championship Series.

== Tournaments ==
=== Championship Series ===
Rugby Europe Sevens
Championship
Edition	Year	Events	Champions	Runners-up	Third	Fourth
I	2002	1	Portugal	Georgia	Germany	France
II	2003	1	Portugal	France	Georgia	Germany
III	2004	1	Portugal	Italy	Ireland	Scotland
IV	2005	1	Portugal	Russia	Italy	France
V	2006	1	Portugal	Russia	Italy	France
VI	2007	1	Russia	France	Moldova	Spain
VII	2008	1	Portugal	Wales	Georgia	Ireland
VIII	2009	1	Russia	France	Italy	Spain
IX	2010	1	Portugal	France	Russia	Spain
Grand Prix Series
X	2011	4	Portugal	England	Spain	Russia
XI	2012	3	England	Portugal	France	Spain
XII	2013	2	England	France	Russia	Portugal
XIII	2014	4	France	Scotland	England	Russia
XIV	2015	3	France	Spain	England	Russia
XV	2016	3	Russia	France	Spain	Germany
XVI	2017	4	Russia	Ireland	Spain	Wales
XVII	2018	4	Ireland	Germany	Russia	England
XVIII	2019	2	Germany	France	Ireland	Spain
–	2020	Series not played because of COVID-19 pandemic.				
Championship Series
XIX	2021	2	Spain	Germany	Russia	Lithuania
XX	2022	2	Spain	Germany	France	Belgium
XXI	2023	2	Ireland	France	Spain	Great Britain
XXII	2024	2	France	Ireland	Germany	Portugal
XXIII	2025	2	France	Spain	Italy	Belgium
XXIV	2026	2	France	Italy	Belgium	Germany

==== Team records ====
Team	Champions	Runners-up	Third	Fourth
Portugal	8 (2002, 2003, 2004, 2005, 2006, 2008, 2010, 2011)	1 (2012)	—N/a	2 (2013, 2024)
France	5 (2014, 2015, 2024, 2025, 2026)	8 (2003, 2007, 2009, 2010, 2013, 2016, 2019, 2023)	2 (2012, 2022)	3 (2002, 2005, 2006)
Russia	4 (2007, 2009, 2016, 2017)	2 (2005, 2006)	4 (2010, 2013, 2018, 2021)	3 (2011, 2014, 2015)
Spain	2 (2021, 2022)	2 (2015, 2025)	4 (2011, 2016, 2017, 2023)	5 (2007, 2009, 2010, 2012, 2019)
Ireland	2 (2018, 2023)	2 (2017, 2024)	2 (2004, 2019)	1 (2008)
England	2 (2012, 2013)	1 (2011)	2 (2014, 2015)	1 (2018)
Germany	1 (2019)	3 (2018, 2021, 2022)	2 (2002, 2024)	3 (2003, 2016, 2026)
Italy	—N/a	2 (2004, 2026)	4 (2005, 2006, 2009, 2025)	—N/a
Georgia	—N/a	1 (2002)	2 (2003, 2008)	—N/a
Scotland	—N/a	1 (2014)	—N/a	1 (2004)
Wales	—N/a	1 (2008)	—N/a	1 (2017)
Belgium	—N/a	—N/a	1 (2026)	2 (2022, 2025)
Moldova	—N/a	—N/a	1 (2007)	—N/a
Lithuania	—N/a	—N/a	—N/a	1 (2021)
Great Britain	—N/a	—N/a	—N/a	1 (2023)

Updated to 2026

=== Trophy ===
Year	Champions	Runners-up	Third	Fourth
2011	Germany	Belgium	Sweden	Lithuania
2012	Romania	Belgium	Lithuania	Cyprus
2013	Belgium	Poland	Netherlands	Sweden
2014	Lithuania	Poland	Cyprus	Sweden
2015	Poland	Ukraine	Latvia	Moldova
2016	Ireland	Ukraine	Sweden	Romania
2017	Sweden	Romania	Luxembourg	Ukraine
2018	Romania	Belgium	Lithuania	Denmark
2019	Lithuania	Ukraine	Belgium	Croatia
2020	Series not played because of COVID-19 pandemic.			
2021	Czech Republic	Belgium	Ukraine	Sweden
2022	Ireland	England	Wales	Romania
2023	Ukraine	Croatia	Sweden	Latvia
2024	Czech Republic	Sweden	Latvia	Hungary
2025	Poland	Ukraine	Romania	Latvia

=== Conference ===
==== Conference 1 ====
Year		Champions	Runners-up	Third
2011		Serbia	Latvia	Hungary
2012		Croatia	Latvia	Norway
2013	North	Latvia	Norway	Luxembourg
2013	South	Monaco	Hungary	Switzerland
2014	North	Czech Republic	Norway	Luxembourg
2014	South	Hungary	Bulgaria	Switzerland
2015		Ireland	Serbia	Slovenia
2016		Croatia	Luxembourg	Hungary
2017		Hungary	Bulgaria	Slovakia
2018		Czech Republic	Bosnia and Herzegovina	Moldova
2019		Hungary	Turkey	Moldova
2020		Series not played because of COVID-19 pandemic.		
2021		Bulgaria	Monaco	Moldova
2022		Switzerland	Moldova	Turkey
2023		Turkey	Monaco	Austria
2024		Norway	Denmark	Serbia
2025		Monaco	Malta	Austria
2026		🇮🇱Israel	Austria	Cyprus

==== Conference 2 ====
Year	Champions	Runners-up	Third
2015	Ireland	Bosnia and Herzegovina	Serbia
2016	Malta	Montenegro	Austria
2017	Austria	Finland	Estonia
2018	Switzerland	Andorra	Liechtenstein
2019–2021	Competition not held		
2022	Malta	San Marino	Slovakia
2023	San Marino	Slovakia	Montenegro
2024	Cyprus	Slovakia	Slovenia
2025	Slovenia	San Marino	Estonia
2026	Slovakia	Gibraltar	San Marino

== Partners ==
- Société Générale, Eurosport 2 (official broadcaster), Berugbe
