= 1997 Rugby World Cup Sevens qualifying =

Of the twenty-four teams in the 1997 Rugby World Cup Sevens, three were automatically qualified: 1993 champions England, runners-up Australia and hosts Hong Kong. The other twenty-one slots were contested by sixty-four national teams in three tournaments: Lisbon, Dubai and Punta del Este, with the quarterfinalists of the first two tournaments, then the semifinalists and Plate winner of the third advancing. Through qualifying through their tournaments, Cook Islands, Morocco, Portugal and Zimbabwe all made their first World Cup appearance.

== Qualifier 1: Lisbon ==
=== Day 1 ===
Pool A

Teams	Pld	W	D	L	PF	PA	+/−	Pts
Ireland	2	2	0	0	153	0	+153	6
Hungary	2	1	0	1	19	90	−71	4
Norway	2	0	0	2	10	92	−82	2

Matches

1 June 1996

Ireland	80−0	Hungary

1 June 1996

Norway	0−19	Hungary

1 June 1996

Ireland	73−0	Norway

Pool B

Teams	Pld	W	D	L	PF	PA	+/−	Pts
New Zealand	2	2	0	0	165	0	+165	6
Moldova	2	1	0	1	31	111	−80	4
Lithuania	2	0	0	2	19	104	−85	2

Matches

1 June 1996

New Zealand	73−0	Lithuania

1 June 1996

Moldova	31−19	Lithuania

1 June 1996

New Zealand	92−0	Moldova

Pool C

Teams	Pld	W	D	L	PF	PA	+/−	Pts
Spain	2	2	0	0	83	3	+80	6
Belgium	2	1	0	1	69	24	+45	4
Bulgaria	2	0	0	2	0	125	−125	2

Matches

1 June 1996

Spain	59−0	Bulgaria

1 June 1996

Belgium	66−0	Bulgaria

1 June 1996

Spain	24−3	Belgium

Pool D

Teams	Pld	W	D	L	PF	PA	+/−	Pts
South Korea	2	2	0	0	105	12	+93	6
Croatia	2	1	0	1	22	91	−69	'4
Sweden	2	0	0	2	19	43	−24	2

Matches

1 June 1996

South Korea	79−5	Croatia

1 June 1996

Sweden	12−17	Croatia

1 June 1996

South Korea	26−7	Sweden

Pool E

Teams	Pld	W	D	L	PF	PA	+/−	Pts
Canada	2	2	0	0	78	0	+78	6
Ukraine	2	1	0	1	36	35	+1	4
Switzerland	2	0	0	2	0	79	−79	2

Matches

1 June 1996

Canada	43−0	Switzerland

1 June 1996

Ukraine	36−0	Switzerland

1 June 1996

Canada	35−0	Ukraine

Pool F

Teams	Pld	W	D	L	PF	PA	+/−	Pts
Namibia	2	2	0	0	118	19	+99	6
Georgia	2	1	0	1	47	66	−19	4
Austria	2	0	0	2	14	94	−80	2

Matches

1 June 1996

Namibia	59−7	Austria

1 June 1996

Georgia	35−7	Austria

1 June 1996

Namibia	59−12	Georgia

Pool G

Teams	Pld	W	D	L	PF	PA	+/−	Pts
Romania	2	2	0	0	131	0	+131	6
Poland	2	1	0	1	52	62	−10	4
Andorra	2	0	0	2	5	126	−121	2

Matches

1 June 1996

Romania	74−0	Andorra

1 June 1996

Poland	52−5	Andorra

1 June 1996

Romania	57−0	Poland

Pool H

Teams	Pld	W	D	L	PF	PA	+/−	Pts
Portugal	2	2	0	0	94	12	+82	6
Latvia	2	1	0	1	41	59	−18	4
Luxembourg	2	0	0	2	24	88	−64	2

Matches

1 June 1996

Latvia	41−12	Luxembourg

1 June 1996

Portugal	47−12	Luxembourg

1 June 1996

Latvia	0−47	Portugal

=== Day 2 ===
Legend
Qualified to 1997 Rugby World Cup Sevens

Pool A

Teams	Pld	W	D	L	PF	PA	+/−	Pts
New Zealand	2	2	0	0	155	10	+145	6
Luxembourg	2	1	0	1	36	66	−30	4
Hungary	2	0	0	2	0	115	−115	2

Matches

2 June 1996

New Zealand	66−10	Luxembourg

2 June 1996

Hungary	0−26	Luxembourg

2 June 1996

New Zealand	89−0	Hungary

Pool B

Teams	Pld	W	D	L	PF	PA	+/−	Pts
Ireland	2	2	0	0	80	10	+70	6
Sweden	2	1	0	1	38	43	−5	4
Croatia	2	0	0	2	10	75	−65	2

Matches

2 June 1996

Ireland	33−10	Sweden

2 June 1996

Croatia	10−28	Sweden

2 June 1996

Ireland	47−0	Croatia

Pool C

Teams	Pld	W	D	L	PF	PA	+/−	Pts
Romania	2	2	0	0	136	7	+129	6
Moldova	2	1	0	1	12	84	−72	4
Lithuania	2	0	0	2	14	71	−57	2

Matches

2 June 1996

Romania	59−7	Lithuania

2 June 1996

Moldova	12−7	Lithuania

2 June 1996

Romania	77−0	Moldova

Pool D

Teams	Pld	W	D	L	PF	PA	+/−	Pts
Namibia	2	2	0	0	68	14	+54	6
Ukraine	2	1	0	1	50	26	+24	4
Austria	2	0	0	2	12	90	−78	2

Matches

2 June 1996

Namibia	47−7	Austria

2 June 1996

Ukraine	43−5	Austria

2 June 1996

Namibia	21−7	Ukraine

Pool E

Teams	Pld	W	D	L	PF	PA	+/−	Pts
South Korea	2	2	0	0	87	19	+68	6
Latvia	2	1	0	1	31	45	−14	4
Norway	2	0	0	2	24	78	−54	2

Matches

2 June 1996

South Korea	59−7	Norway

2 June 1996

Latvia	19−17	Norway

2 June 1996

South Korea	28−12	Latvia

Pool F

Teams	Pld	W	D	L	PF	PA	+/−	Pts
Portugal	2	2	0	0	119	17	+102	6
Georgia	2	1	0	1	38	61	−23	4
Andorra	2	0	0	2	15	94	−79	2

Matches

2 June 1996

Portugal	63−10	Andorra

2 June 1996

Georgia	31−5	Andorra

2 June 1996

Portugal	56−7	Georgia

Pool G

Teams	Pld	W	D	L	PF	PA	+/−	Pts
Spain	2	2	0	0	70	14	+56	6
Poland	2	1	0	1	49	28	+21	4
Switzerland	2	0	0	2	7	84	−77	2

Matches

2 June 1996

Spain	42−7	Switzerland

2 June 1996

Poland	42−0	Switzerland

2 June 1996

Spain	28−7	Poland

Pool H

Teams	Pld	W	D	L	PF	PA	+/−	Pts
Canada	2	2	0	0	141	0	+141	6
Belgium	2	1	0	1	61	61	+0	4
Bulgaria	2	0	0	2	0	141	−141	2

Matches

2 June 1996

Canada	80−0	Bulgaria

2 June 1996

Belgium	61−0	Bulgaria

2 June 1996

Canada	61−0	Belgium

== Qualifier 2: Dubai ==
=== Day 1 ===
Pool A

Teams	Pld	W	D	L	PF	PA	+/−	Pts
Fiji	2	2	0	0	96	12	+84	6
Russia	2	1	0	1	50	29	+21	4
Botswana	2	0	0	2	3	108	−105	2

Matches

22 November 1996

Fiji	26−12	Russia

22 November 1996

Botswana	3−38	Russia

22 November 1996

Fiji	70−0	Botswana

Pool B

Teams	Pld	W	D	L	PF	PA	+/−	Pts
South Africa	2	2	0	0	127	5	+122	6
Czech Republic	2	1	0	1	24	97	−73	4
Malaysia	2	0	0	2	19	78	−59	2

Matches

22 November 1996

South Africa	54−0	Malaysia

22 November 1996

Czech Republic	24−19	Malaysia

22 November 1996

South Africa	73−5	Czech Republic

Pool C

Teams	Pld	W	D	L	PF	PA	+/−	Pts
Tonga	2	2	0	0	78	7	+71	6
Denmark	2	1	0	1	26	47	−21	4
Kenya	2	0	0	2	12	62	−50	2

Matches

22 November 1996

Tonga	35−7	Denmark

22 November 1996

Kenya	12−19	Denmark

22 November 1996

Tonga	43−0	Kenya

Pool D

Teams	Pld	W	D	L	PF	PA	+/−	Pts
Wales	2	2	0	0	108	14	+94	6
Zimbabwe	2	1	0	1	68	31	+37	4
Singapore	2	0	0	2	0	131	−131	2

Matches

22 November 1996

Wales	77−0	Singapore

22 November 1996

Zimbabwe	54−0	Singapore

22 November 1996

Wales	31−14	Zimbabwe

Pool E

Teams	Pld	W	D	L	PF	PA	+/−	Pts
Scotland	2	2	0	0	146	5	+141	6
Serbia and Montenegro	2	1	0	1	19	64	−45	4
Zambia	2	0	0	2	5	101	−96	2

Matches

22 November 1996

Scotland	87−0	Zambia

22 November 1996

Serbia and Montenegro	14−5	Zambia

22 November 1996

Scotland	59−5	Serbia and Montenegro

Pool F

Teams	Pld	W	D	L	PF	PA	+/−	Pts
United States	2	2	0	0	93	5	+88	6
Ivory Coast	2	1	0	1	36	43	−7	4
Sri Lanka	2	0	0	2	10	91	−81	2

Matches

22 November 1996

United States	60−0	Sri Lanka

23 November 1996

Ivory Coast	31−10	Sri Lanka

22 November 1996

United States	33−5	Ivory Coast

Pool G

Teams	Pld	W	D	L	PF	PA	+/−	Pts
Morocco	2	2	0	0	45	5	+40	6
Italy	2	1	0	1	46	7	+39	4
Thailand	2	0	0	2	0	79	−79	2

Matches

22 November 1996

Italy	41−0	Thailand

22 November 1996

Morocco	38−0	Thailand

22 November 1996

Italy	5−7	Morocco

Pool H

Teams	Pld	W	D	L	PF	PA	+/−	Pts
(Cooperation Council for the Arab States of the Gulf) Arabian Gulf	2	2	0	0	45	29	+16	6
Chinese Taipei	2	1	0	1	51	31	+20	4
Tunisia	2	0	0	2	22	58	−36	2

Matches

22 November 1996

Arabian Gulf (Cooperation Council for the Arab States of the Gulf)	24−12	Tunisia

22 November 1996

Chinese Taipei	34−10	Tunisia

22 November 1996

Arabian Gulf (Cooperation Council for the Arab States of the Gulf)	21−17	Chinese Taipei

=== Day 2 ===
Legend
Qualified to 1997 Rugby World Cup Sevens

Pool A

Teams	Pld	W	D	L	PF	PA	+/−	Pts
Scotland	2	2	0	0	85	21	+64	6
Tunisia	2	1	0	1	31	38	−7	4
Serbia and Montenegro	2	0	0	2	5	62	−57	2

Matches

23 November 1996

Scotland	33−21	Tunisia

23 November 1996

Serbia and Montenegro	5−10	Tunisia

23 November 1996

Scotland	52−0	Serbia and Montenegro

Pool B

Teams	Pld	W	D	L	PF	PA	+/−	Pts
South Africa	2	2	0	0	126	7	+119	6
Denmark	2	1	0	1	40	66	−26	4
Malaysia	2	0	0	2	7	100	−93	2

Matches

23 November 1996

Denmark	33−7	Malaysia

23 November 1996

South Africa	59−7	Denmark

23 November 1996

South Africa	67−0	Malaysia

Pool C

Teams	Pld	W	D	L	PF	PA	+/−	Pts
Wales	2	2	0	0	111	21	+90	6
Czech Republic	2	1	0	1	31	71	−40	4
Kenya	2	0	0	2	12	62	−50	2

Matches

23 November 1996

Wales	66−14	Czech Republic

23 November 1996

Czech Republic	17−5	Kenya

23 November 1996

Wales	45−7	Kenya

Pool D

Teams	Pld	W	D	L	PF	PA	+/−	Pts
United States	2	2	0	0	69	0	+69	6
Ivory Coast	2	1	0	1	19	37	−18	4
Sri Lanka	2	0	0	2	13	64	−51	2

Matches

23 November 1996

United States	45−0	Sri Lanka

23 November 1996

Ivory Coast	19−13	Sri Lanka

23 November 1996

United States	24−0	Ivory Coast

Pool E

Teams	Pld	W	D	L	PF	PA	+/−	Pts
Fiji	2	2	0	0	157	5	+152	6
Russia	2	1	0	1	55	68	−13	4
Zambia	2	0	0	2	12	151	−139	2

Matches

23 November 1996

Fiji	101−0	Zambia

23 November 1996

Russia	50−12	Zambia

23 November 1996

Fiji	56−5	Russia

Pool F

Teams	Pld	W	D	L	PF	PA	+/−	Pts
Tonga	2	2	0	0	93	17	+76	6
Chinese Taipei	2	1	0	1	60	41	+19	4
Singapore	2	0	0	2	19	114	−95	2

Matches

23 November 1996

Tonga	34−5	Chinese Taipei

23 November 1996

Chinese Taipei	55−7	Singapore

23 November 1996

Tonga	59−12	Singapore

Pool G

Teams	Pld	W	D	L	PF	PA	+/−	Pts
Morocco	2	2	0	0	41	6	+35	6
Italy	2	1	0	1	45	28	+17	4
Botswana	2	0	0	2	13	65	−52	2

Matches

23 November 1996

Morocco	20−6	Botswana

23 November 1996

Italy	45−7	Botswana

23 November 1996

Morocco	21−0	Italy

Pool H

Teams	Pld	W	D	L	PF	PA	+/−	Pts
Zimbabwe	2	2	0	0	92	19	+73	6
(Cooperation Council for the Arab States of the Gulf) Arabian Gulf	2	1	0	1	53	42	+11	4
Thailand	2	0	0	2	14	98	−84	2

Matches

23 November 1996

Arabian Gulf (Cooperation Council for the Arab States of the Gulf)	41−7	Thailand

23 November 1996

Zimbabwe	57−7	Thailand

23 November 1996

Arabian Gulf (Cooperation Council for the Arab States of the Gulf)	12−35	Zimbabwe

== Qualifier 3: Punta del Este ==
=== Day 1 ===
Pool A

Teams	Pld	W	D	L	PF	PA	+/−	Pts
Japan	3	2	0	1	87	33	+54	7
Chile	3	2	0	1	68	26	+42	7
Netherlands	3	2	0	1	50	19	+31	7
Tahiti	3	0	0	3	0	127	−127	3

Matches

5 January 1997

Japan	54−0	Tahiti

5 January 1997

Netherlands	12−0	Chile

5 January 1997

Chile	47−0	Tahiti

5 January 1997

Japan	19−12	Netherlands

5 January 1997

Netherlands	26−0	Tahiti

5 January 1997

Japan	14−21	Chile

Pool B

Teams	Pld	W	D	L	PF	PA	+/−	Pts
Samoa	3	3	0	0	174	15	+159	9
Trinidad and Tobago	3	2	0	1	34	81	−47	7
Israel	3	1	0	2	27	108	−81	5
Paraguay	3	0	0	3	33	74	−41	3

Matches

5 January 1997

Samoa	68−0	Israel

5 January 1997

Trinidad and Tobago	15−7	Paraguay

5 January 1997

Samoa	59−0	Trinidad and Tobago

5 January 1997

Israel	12−11	Paraguay

5 January 1997

Samoa	47−15	Paraguay

5 January 1997

Trinidad and Tobago	19−15	Israel

Pool C

Teams	Pld	W	D	L	PF	PA	+/−	Pts
Argentina	3	3	0	0	125	5	+120	9
Germany	3	2	0	1	92	67	+25	7
Papua New Guinea	3	1	0	2	57	59	−2	5
Bermuda	3	0	0	3	19	162	−143	3

Matches

5 January 1997

Argentina	63−0	Bermuda

5 January 1997

Germany	28−17	Papua New Guinea

5 January 1997

Argentina	24−0	Papua New Guinea

5 January 1997

Germany	59−12	Bermuda

5 January 1997

Argentina	38−5	Germany

5 January 1997

Papua New Guinea	40−7	Bermuda

Pool D

Teams	Pld	W	D	L	PF	PA	+/−	Pts
France	3	3	0	0	109	12	+97	9
Cook Islands	3	2	0	1	58	43	+15	7
Uruguay	3	1	0	2	60	62	−2	5
Bahamas	3	0	0	3	22	132	−110	3

Matches

5 January 1997

France	55−0	Bahamas

5 January 1997

Cook Islands	17−12	Uruguay

5 January 1997

France	28−12	Uruguay

5 January 1997

Cook Islands	41−5	Bahamas

5 January 1997

France	26−0	Cook Islands

5 January 1997

Uruguay	36−17	Bahamas

=== Day 2 ===
Legend
Qualified to 1997 Rugby World Cup Sevens
Qualified to plate tournament for qualification chance

Pool A

Teams	Pld	W	D	L	PF	PA	+/−	Pts
Samoa	3	3	0	0	142	14	+128	9
Japan	3	2	0	1	71	53	+18	7
Germany	3	1	0	2	27	99	−72	5
Netherlands	3	0	0	3	22	96	−74	3

Matches

6 January 1997

Samoa	54−0	Germany

6 January 1997

Japan	24−10	Netherlands

6 January 1997

Netherlands	5−22	Germany

6 January 1997

Samoa	38−7	Japan

6 January 1997

Japan	40−5	Germany

6 January 1997

Samoa	50−7	Netherlands

Pool B

Teams	Pld	W	D	L	PF	PA	+/−	Pts
France	3	3	0	0	83	0	+83	9
Cook Islands	3	1	1	1	36	66	−30	6
Argentina	3	1	0	2	43	57	−14	5
Chile	3	0	1	2	33	72	−39	4

Matches

6 January 1997

Argentina	0−26	France

6 January 1997

Chile	19−19	Cook Islands

6 January 1997

France	35−0	Cook Islands

6 January 1997

Argentina	31−14	Chile

6 January 1997

France	22−0	Chile

6 January 1997

Argentina	12−17	Cook Islands

Plate

Semi-finals
6 January 1997
Germany	24
Chile	19
6 January 1997
Netherlands	5
Argentina	40

Plate/Qualifier Final
6 January 1997
Germany	12
Argentina	49

Cup

Semi-finals
6 January 1997
Samoa	45
Cook Islands	7
6 January 1997
Japan	14
France	24

Final
6 January 1997
Samoa	14
France	35
Third place
6 January 1997
Cook Islands	31
Japan	26
