= 2023 Rugby Europe Sevens Championship Series =

Rugby tournaments

2023 Rugby Europe Sevens
- Series XXI
- Hosts: Portugal; Germany
- Date: 9 June – 9 July 2023
- Nations: 12

Final positions
- Champions: Ireland
- Runners-up: France
- Third: Spain

Team changes
- Relegated: Romania; Czech Republic

The 2023 Rugby Europe Sevens Championship Series was the twenty-first edition of the continental championship for rugby sevens in Europe. The series took place over two legs, the first at Algarve in Portugal and the second at Hamburg in Germany. Ireland won the first leg of the tournament defeating Georgia in the Algarve final, 19–10. Ireland earned a third place finish at the Hamburg event, thereby clinching the Rugby Europe Sevens Championship.

== Teams ==
The current list of teams confirmed to be participating in the Sevens Championship Series.

Poland, were relegated to the 2023 Trophy tournament after finishing last in the previous year's Championship tournament.

Participating teams increased from ten to twelve teams for this year's tournament. This enabled three groups of four teams as opposed to the two groups of five teams that participated in the 2022 Rugby Europe Sevens Championship Series. Both Ireland and England were promoted from the 2022 Rugby Europe Sevens Trophy. However, Great Britain replaced England in the tournament following World Rugby's mandate of Olympic teams competing on the World Rugby Sevens Series from 2023 to 2024 season and the decision by the rugby authorities of England, Scotland, and Wales to merge and compete as Great Britain in advance of the 2024 Olympic games. Romania who finished fourth behind Wales in the 2022 Rugby Europe Sevens Trophy benefited from the three British teams merging by taking up the final position in the tournament.

- Belgium
- Czech Republic
- France
- Georgia
- Germany
- Great Britain
- Ireland
- Italy
- Lithuania
- Portugal
- Romania
- Spain

== Schedule ==
The official schedule for the 2023 Rugby Europe Sevens Championship Series is:

2023 Series schedule
| Leg | Stadium | City | Dates | Winners | Runners-up | Third place |
|---|---|---|---|---|---|---|
| Portugal | Complexo Desportivo de Vila Real de Santo António | Algarve | 9–11 June | Ireland | Georgia | France |
| Germany | Sports Park Steinwiesenweg | Hamburg | 7–9 July | Spain | France | Ireland |

== Standings ==
2023 Rugby Europe Sevens Championship
| Pos | Event Team | Algarve | Hamburg | Points total |
|---|---|---|---|---|
| 1 | Ireland | 20 | 16 | 36 |
| 2 | France | 16 | 18 | 34 |
| 3 | Spain | 10 | 20 | 30 |
| 4 | Great Britain | 14 | 14 | 28 |
| 5 | Portugal^{*} | 12 | 10 | 22 |
| 6 | Georgia^{*} | 18 | 4 | 22 |
| 7 | Germany | 8 | 12 | 20 |
| 8 | Italy | 6 | 8 | 14 |
| 9 | Belgium | 4 | 6 | 10 |
| 10 | Lithuania^{*} | 3 | 2 | 5 |
| 11 | Romania^{*} | 2 | 3 | 5 |
| 12 | Czech Republic | 1 | 1 | 2 |

Legend
| Blue fill | Entry to World Challenger Series |
| Dark bar | Already a core team for the 2023–24 World Rugby Sevens Series |
| Red fill | Relegated to 2024 European Trophy |

Notes:

^^{*} As per Rugby Europe rules, Lithuania was placed higher than Romania due to a better points difference for the series. Portugal was placed higher than Georgia due to a better points difference for the series.

== First leg – Algarve ==
=== Pool stage ===
==== Pool A ====
| Team | Pld | W | D | L | PF | PA | PD | Pts |
|---|---|---|---|---|---|---|---|---|
| Spain | 3 | 3 | 0 | 0 | 100 | 24 | 76 | 9 |
| Portugal | 3 | 2 | 0 | 1 | 95 | 24 | 71 | 7 |
| Lithuania | 3 | 1 | 0 | 2 | 31 | 72 | –41 | 5 |
| Czech Republic | 3 | 0 | 0 | 3 | 10 | 116 | –106 | 3 |

| Spain | 43–0 | Czech Republic |

| Portugal | 29–0 | Lithuania |

| Spain | 38–7 | Lithuania |

| Portugal | 49–5 | Czech Republic |

| Lithuania | 24–5 | Czech Republic |

| Spain | 19–17 | Portugal |

==== Pool B ====
| Team | Pld | W | D | L | PF | PA | PD | Pts |
|---|---|---|---|---|---|---|---|---|
| Germany | 3 | 3 | 0 | 0 | 64 | 26 | 38 | 9 |
| Italy | 3 | 2 | 0 | 1 | 48 | 33 | 15 | 7 |
| Georgia | 3 | 1 | 0 | 2 | 45 | 50 | –5 | 5 |
| Romania | 3 | 0 | 0 | 3 | 26 | 74 | –48 | 3 |

| Germany | 26–12 | Romania |

| Italy | 17–14 | Georgia |

| Germany | 26–7 | Georgia |

| Italy | 24–7 | Romania |

| Georgia | 24–7 | Romania |

| Germany | 12–7 | Italy |

==== Pool C ====
| Team | Pld | W | D | L | PF | PA | PD | Pts |
|---|---|---|---|---|---|---|---|---|
| Ireland | 3 | 3 | 0 | 0 | 77 | 21 | 56 | 9 |
| France | 3 | 2 | 0 | 1 | 41 | 60 | –19 | 7 |
| Great Britain | 3 | 1 | 0 | 2 | 40 | 36 | 4 | 5 |
| Belgium | 3 | 0 | 0 | 3 | 26 | 67 | –41 | 3 |

| France | 17–14 | Great Britain |

| Belgium | 7–31 | Ireland |

| France | 7–34 | Ireland |

| Great Britain | 19–7 | Belgium |

| France | 17–12 | Belgium |

| Ireland | 12–7 | Great Britain |

=== Knockout stage ===
==== 9th Place ====
Semi-finals
Lithuania | 41
Czech Republic | 14
Belgium | 45
Romania | 7

Ninth place
Lithuania | 5
Belgium | 26
Eleventh place
Czech Republic | 14
Romania | 26

==== 5th Place ====
Semi-finals
Spain | 38
Italy | 21
Germany | 19
Portugal | 21

Fifth place
Spain | 12
Portugal | 17
Seventh place
Italy | 12
Germany | 17

==== Cup ====
Quarter-finals
Spain | 12
Georgia | 24
Italy | 7
France | 24
Germany | 12
Great Britain | 22
Ireland | 29
Portugal | 10

Semi-finals
Georgia | 14
France | 7
Great Britain | 14
Ireland | 17

Final
Georgia | 10
Ireland | 19
Third place
France | 21
Great Britain | 14

== Second leg – Hamburg ==
=== Pool stage ===
==== Pool A ====
| Team | Pld | W | D | L | PF | PA | PD | Pts |
|---|---|---|---|---|---|---|---|---|
| Germany | 3 | 2 | 0 | 1 | 84 | 28 | 56 | 7 |
| Spain | 3 | 2 | 0 | 1 | 90 | 38 | 52 | 7 |
| Ireland | 3 | 2 | 0 | 1 | 62 | 34 | 28 | 7 |
| Czech Republic | 3 | 0 | 0 | 3 | 0 | 136 | –136 | 3 |

7 July 2023
14:35 UTC

| Ireland | 50–0 | Czech Republic |

Sports Park Steinwiesenweg

7 July 2023
14:57 UTC

| Spain | 28–26 | Germany |

Sports Park Steinwiesenweg

8 July 2023
10:40 UTC

| Spain | 52–0 | Czech Republic |

Sports Park Steinwiesenweg

8 July 2023
11:02 UTC

| Ireland | 0–24 | Germany |

Sports Park Steinwiesenweg

8 July 2023
13:56 UTC

| Ireland | 12–10 | Spain |

Sports Park Steinwiesenweg

8 July 2023
14:18 UTC

| Germany | 34–0 | Czech Republic |

Sports Park Steinwiesenweg

==== Pool B ====
| Team | Pld | W | D | L | PF | PA | PD | Pts |
|---|---|---|---|---|---|---|---|---|
| Portugal | 3 | 2 | 0 | 1 | 71 | 45 | 26 | 7 |
| Italy | 3 | 2 | 0 | 1 | 87 | 64 | 23 | 7 |
| Georgia | 3 | 1 | 1 | 1 | 55 | 52 | 3 | 6 |
| Romania | 3 | 0 | 1 | 2 | 38 | 90 | –52 | 4 |

7 JUly 2023
13:51 UTC

| Georgia | 19–19 | Romania |

Sports Park Steinwiesenweg

7 July 2023
14:13 UTC

| Portugal | 33–21 | Italy |

Sports Park Steinwiesenweg

8 July 2023
09:56 UTC

| Georgia | 17–21 | Italy |

Sports Park Steinwiesenweg

8 July 2023
10:18 UTC

| Portugal | 26–5 | Romania |

Sports Park Steinwiesenweg

8 July 2023
13:12 UTC

| Italy | 45–14 | Romania |

Sports Park Steinwiesenweg

8 July 2023
13:34 UTC

| Georgia | 19–12 | Portugal |

Sports Park Steinwiesenweg

==== Pool C ====
| Team | Pld | W | D | L | PF | PA | PD | Pts |
|---|---|---|---|---|---|---|---|---|
| Belgium | 3 | 2 | 0 | 1 | 64 | 36 | 28 | 7 |
| France | 3 | 2 | 0 | 1 | 72 | 44 | 28 | 7 |
| Great Britain | 3 | 2 | 0 | 1 | 43 | 41 | 2 | 7 |
| Lithuania | 3 | 0 | 0 | 3 | 17 | 75 | –58 | 3 |

7 July 2023
13:07 UTC

| France | 38–10 | Lithuania |

Sports Park Steinwiesenweg

7 July 2023
13:29 UTC

| Great Britain | 14–22 | Belgium |

Sports Park Steinwiesenweg

8 July 2023
09:12 UTC

| France | 22–15 | Belgium |

Sports Park Steinwiesenweg

8 July 2023
09:34 UTC

| Great Britain | 10–7 | Lithuania |

Sports Park Steinwiesenweg

8 July 2023
12:28 UTC

| Belgium | 27–0 | Lithuania |

Sports Park Steinwiesenweg

8 July 2023
12:50 UTC

| France | 12–19 | Great Britain |

Sports Park Steinwiesenweg

=== Knockout stage ===
==== 9th Place ====
Semi-finals
8 July 2023 16:18 UTC
Georgia | 14
Czech Republic | 7
8 July 2023 16:40 UTC
Romania | 20
Lithuania | 0

Ninth place
9 July 2023 11:12 UTC
Georgia | 17
Romania | 12
Eleventh place
9 July 2023 10:50 UTC
Czech Republic | 19
Lithuania | 24

==== 5th Place ====
Semi-finals
9 July 2023 09:22 UTC
Germany | 31
Italy | 5
9 July 2023 09:44 UTC
Portugal | 28
Belgium | 10

Fifth place
9 July 2023 12:50 UTC
Germany | 26
Portugal | 12
Seventh place
9 July 2023 12:28 UTC
Italy | 28
Belgium | 0

==== Cup ====
Quarter-finals
8 July 2023 17:02 UTC
Germany | 19
Great Britain | 21
8 July 2023 18:08 UTC
Italy | 7
France | 33
8 July 17:24 UTC
Portugal | 12
Ireland | 19
8 July 2023 17:46 UTC
Belgium | 0
Spain | 19

Semi-finals
9 July 2023 10:06 UTC
Great Britain | 7
France | 33
9 July 2023 10:28 UTC
Ireland | 19
Spain | 24

Final
9 July 2023 14:47 UTC
France | 19
Spain | 21
Third place
9 July 2023 13:47 UTC
Great Britain | 7
Ireland | 12
