= 2024 Rugby Europe Sevens Championship Series =

Rugby tournaments

2024 Rugby Europe Sevens
- Series XXII
- Hosts: Croatia; Germany
- Date: 7 – 30 June 2024
- Nations: 12

Final positions
- Champions: France
- Runners-up: Ireland
- Third: Germany

Team changes
- Relegated: Ukraine; Croatia

The 2024 Rugby Europe Sevens Championship Series was the twenty-second edition of the continental championship for rugby sevens in Europe. The series took place over two legs, the first at Makarska in Croatia and the second at Hamburg in Germany.

== Teams ==
The list of teams participating in the Sevens Championship Series.

Romania and Czechia, were relegated to the 2024 Trophy tournament after finishing eleventh and twelfth respectively in the previous year's Championship tournament.

Ukraine and Croatia, were promoted after finishing first and second respectively in the previous year's Trophy tournament.

- Belgium
- Croatia
- France
- Georgia
- Germany
- Great Britain
- Ireland
- Italy
- Lithuania
- Portugal
- Spain
- Ukraine

== Schedule ==
The official schedule for the 2024 Rugby Europe Sevens Championship Series was:

2023 Series schedule
| Leg | Stadium | City | Dates | Winners | Runners-up | Third place |
|---|---|---|---|---|---|---|
| Croatia | Gradski stadion | Makarska | 7–9 June | France | Ireland | Germany |
| Germany | Sports Park Steinwiesenweg | Hamburg | 28–30 June | Ireland | France | Portugal |

== Standings ==
2024 Rugby Europe Sevens Championship
| Pos | Event Team | Makarska | Hamburg | Points total |
|---|---|---|---|---|
| 1 | France | 20 | 18 | 38^{*} |
| 2 | Ireland | 18 | 20 | 38^{*} |
| 3 | Germany | 16 | 14 | 30 |
| 4 | Portugal | 12 | 16 | 28 |
| 5 | Georgia | 14 | 12 | 26 |
| 6 | Italy | 10 | 10 | 20 |
| 7 | Spain | 4 | 8 | 12^{*} |
| 8 | Belgium | 6 | 6 | 12^{*} |
| 9 | Great Britain | 8 | 3 | 11 |
| 10 | Lithuania | 3 | 4 | 7 |
| 11 | Ukraine | 1 | 2 | 3^{*} |
| 12 | Croatia | 2 | 1 | 3^{*} |

Legend
| Blue fill | Entry to World Challenger Series |
| Dark bar | Already a core team for the 2024–25 SVNS |
| Red fill | Relegated to 2025 European Trophy |

Notes:

^^{*} As per Rugby Europe rules, "In case of two teams equal in ranking points at the end of the series, the point difference will apply (difference of points scored ‘for and against’ by each respective team in all tournaments Matches). The Team with the highest point difference shall be ranked higher in the final competition ranking." Therefore France (+238) were placed higher than Ireland (+200), Spain (+20) were placed higher than Belgium (-44), and Ukraine (-185) were placed higher than Croatia (-263) due to higher points difference.

== Makarska ==
=== Pool A ===
| Team | W | D | L | PF | PA | PD | Pts |
|---|---|---|---|---|---|---|---|
| Germany | 2 | 1 | 0 | 76 | 5 | +71 | 8 |
| Ireland | 2 | 1 | 0 | 71 | 22 | +49 | 8 |
| Georgia | 1 | 0 | 2 | 44 | 56 | -12 | 5 |
| Croatia | 0 | 0 | 2 | 17 | 71 | -54 | 2 |

7 June
14:28

| Georgia | 5–22 | Germany |

Gradski stadion, Makarska

7 June
14:50

| Ireland | 42–0 | Croatia |

Gradski stadion, Makarska

7 June
19:38

| Ireland | 12–12 | Germany |

Gradski stadion, Makarska

7 June
20:00

| Georgia | 29–17 | Croatia |

Gradski stadion, Makarska

8 June
14:28

| Ireland | 17–10 | Georgia |

Gradski stadion, Makarska

8 June
14:50

| Germany | 54–0 | Croatia |

Gradski stadion, Makarska

=== Pool B ===
| Team | W | D | L | PF | PA | PD | Pts |
|---|---|---|---|---|---|---|---|
| France | 2 | 0 | 1 | 106 | 24 | +82 | 7 |
| Portugal | 2 | 0 | 1 | 76 | 31 | +45 | 7 |
| Italy | 2 | 0 | 1 | 57 | 50 | +7 | 7 |
| Ukraine | 0 | 0 | 3 | 5 | 139 | -134 | 3 |

7 June
13:44

| Portugal | 5–17 | Italy |

Gradski stadion, Makarska

7 June
14:06

| France | 47–5 | Ukraine |

Gradski stadion, Makarska

7 June
18:54

| Portugal | 52–0 | Ukraine |

Gradski stadion, Makarska

7 June
19:16

| France | 42–0 | Italy |

Gradski stadion, Makarska

8 June
13:44

| Italy | 40–0 | Ukraine |

Gradski stadion, Makarska

8 June
14:06

| France | 14–19 | Portugal |

Gradski stadion, Makarska

=== Pool C ===
| Team | W | D | L | PF | PA | PD | Pts |
|---|---|---|---|---|---|---|---|
| Belgium | 3 | 0 | 0 | 53 | 42 | +10 | 9 |
| Great Britain | 2 | 0 | 1 | 55 | 41 | +14 | 7 |
| Spain | 1 | 0 | 2 | 34 | 46 | -12 | 5 |
| Lithuania | 0 | 0 | 3 | 36 | 48 | -12 | 3 |

7 June
13:00

| Great Britain | 19–22 | Belgium |

Gradski stadion, Makarska

7 June
13:22

| Spain | 17–10 | Lithuania |

Gradski stadion, Makarska

7 June
18:10

| Great Britain | 17–14 | Lithuania |

Gradski stadion, Makarska

7 June
18:32

| Spain | 12–17 | Belgium |

Gradski stadion, Makarska

8 June
13:00

| Belgium | 14–12 | Lithuania |

Gradski stadion, Makarska

8 June
13:22

| Spain | 5–19 | Great Britain |

Gradski stadion, Makarska

=== 9th to 12th playoffs ===
9th place semifinals
8 June 2024– 18:10 – Gradski stadion
Spain | 36
Ukraine | 7
8 June 2024– 18:32 – Gradski stadion
Lithuania | 26
Croatia | 5

9th place final
9 June 2024– 15:06 – Gradski stadion
Spain | 19
Lithuania | 17
11th place final
9 June 2024– 14:22 – Gradski stadion
Ukraine | 10
Croatia | 21

=== 5th to 8th playoffs ===
5th place semifinals
9 June 2024– 11:14 – Gradski stadion
Belgium | 14
Portugal | 19
9 June 2024– 11:36 – Gradski stadion
Italy | 26
Great Britain | 19

5th place final
9 June 2024– 16:34 – Gradski stadion
Portugal | 45
Italy | 7
7th place final
9 June 2024– 15:50 – Gradski stadion
Belgium | 7
Great Britain | 27

=== Cup ===
Quarterfinals
8 June 2024– 18:54 – Gradski stadion
Belgium | 7
Georgia (a.e.t.) | 12
8 June 2024– 20:00 – Gradski stadion
France | 40
Portugal | 12
8 June 2024– 19:38 – Gradski stadion
Germany | 31
Italy | 5
8 June 2024– 19:16 – Gradski stadion
Ireland | 24
Great Britain | 7

Semifinals
9 June 2024– 12:42 – Gradski stadion
Georgia | 7
France | 26
9 June 2024– 13:04 – Gradski stadion
Germany | 7
Ireland | 31

Final
9 June 2024– 19:30 – Gradski stadion
France | 12
Ireland | 7
3rd place final
9 June 2024– 18:30 – Gradski stadion
Georgia | 5
Germany | 31

=== Final placings ===
| Place | Team |
|---|---|
| 1st place, gold medalist(s) | France |
| 2nd place, silver medalist(s) | Ireland |
| 3rd place, bronze medalist(s) | Germany |
| 4 | Georgia |
| 5 | Portugal |
| 6 | Italy |
| 7 | Great Britain |
| 8 | Belgium |
| 9 | Spain |
| 10 | Lithuania |
| 11 | Croatia |
| 12 | Ukraine |

== Hamburg ==
=== Pool A ===
| Team | W | D | L | PF | PA | PD | Pts |
|---|---|---|---|---|---|---|---|
| France | 3 | 0 | 0 | 111 | 36 | +75 | 9 |
| Italy | 2 | 0 | 1 | 53 | 78 | -25 | 7 |
| Great Britain | 1 | 0 | 2 | 76 | 74 | +2 | 5 |
| Ukraine | 0 | 0 | 3 | 43 | 95 | -52 | 3 |

28 June
12:30

| France | 33-17 | Ukraine |

Sports Park Steinwiesenweg, Hamburg

28 June
12:52

| Italy | 31-17 | Great Britain |

Sports Park Steinwiesenweg, Hamburg

28 June
17:30

| France | 31–19 | Great Britain |

Sports Park Steinwiesenweg, Hamburg

28 June
17:52

| Italy | 22–14 | Ukraine |

Sports Park Steinwiesenweg, Hamburg

29 June
12:00

| France | 47–0 | Italy |

Sports Park Steinwiesenweg, Hamburg

29 June
12:22

| Great Britain | 40–12 | Ukraine |

Sports Park Steinwiesenweg, Hamburg

=== Pool B ===
| Team | W | D | L | PF | PA | PD | Pts |
|---|---|---|---|---|---|---|---|
| Ireland | 3 | 0 | 0 | 110 | 21 | +89 | 9 |
| Portugal | 2 | 0 | 1 | 85 | 52 | +33 | 7 |
| Belgium | 1 | 0 | 2 | 87 | 72 | +15 | 5 |
| Croatia | 0 | 0 | 3 | 12 | 149 | -137 | 3 |

28 June
13:14

| Ireland | 43-0 | Croatia |

Sports Park Steinwiesenweg, Hamburg

28 June
13:36

| Portugal | 24-21 | Belgium |

Sports Park Steinwiesenweg, Hamburg

28 June
18:14

| Ireland | 43–7 | Belgium |

Sports Park Steinwiesenweg, Hamburg

28 June
18:36

| Portugal | 47–7 | Croatia |

Sports Park Steinwiesenweg, Hamburg

29 June
10:44

| Ireland | 24–14 | Portugal |

Sports Park Steinwiesenweg, Hamburg

29 June
13:06

| Belgium | 59–5 | Croatia |

Sports Park Steinwiesenweg, Hamburg

=== Pool C ===
| Team | W | D | L | PF | PA | PD | Pts |
|---|---|---|---|---|---|---|---|
| Germany | 3 | 0 | 0 | 75 | 21 | +54 | 9 |
| Georgia | 2 | 0 | 1 | 27 | 47 | -20 | 7 |
| Spain | 1 | 0 | 2 | 71 | 55 | +16 | 5 |
| Lithuania | 0 | 0 | 3 | 24 | 74 | -50 | 3 |

28 June
13:58

| Georgia | 17-12 | Spain |

Sports Park Steinwiesenweg, Hamburg

28 June
14:20

| Germany | 19-7 | Lithuania |

Sports Park Steinwiesenweg, Hamburg

28 June
18:58

| Georgia | 10–7 | Lithuania |

Sports Park Steinwiesenweg, Hamburg

28 June
19:20

| Germany | 28–14 | Spain |

Sports Park Steinwiesenweg, Hamburg

29 June
13:28

| Spain | 45–10 | Lithuania |

Sports Park Steinwiesenweg, Hamburg

29 June
13:50

| Germany | 28–0 | Georgia |

Sports Park Steinwiesenweg, Hamburg

=== 9th to 12th playoffs ===
9th place semifinals
29 June 2024– 17:00 – Sports Park Steinwiesenweg
Great Britain | 38
Croatia | 14
29 June 2024– 17:22 – Sports Park Steinwiesenweg
Lithuania | 19
Ukraine | 12

9th place final
30 June 2024– 13:21 – Sports Park Steinwiesenweg
Great Britain | 14
Lithuania | 17
11th place final
30 June 2024– 12:37 – Sports Park Steinwiesenweg
Croatia | 0
Ukraine | 38

=== 5th to 8th playoffs ===
5th place semifinals
30 June 2024– 09:44 – Sports Park Steinwiesenweg
Belgium | 7
Georgia (aet) | 10
30 June 2024– 10:06 – Sports Park Steinwiesenweg
Spain | 12
Italy | 15

5th place final
30 June 2024– 14:49 – Sports Park Steinwiesenweg
Georgia | 14
Italy | 12
7th place final
30 June 2024– 14:05 – Sports Park Steinwiesenweg
Belgium | 7
Spain | 24

=== Cup ===
Quarterfinals
29 June 2024– 17:44 – Sports Park Steinwiesenweg
Ireland | 36
Belgium | 7
29 June 2024– 18:06 – Sports Park Steinwiesenweg
Portugal | 21
Georgia | 14
29 June 2024– 18:28 – Sports Park Steinwiesenweg
France | 31
Spain | 12
29 June 2024– 18:50 – Sports Park Steinwiesenweg
Germany | 35
Italy | 12

Semifinals
30 June 2024– 11:12 – Sports Park Steinwiesenweg
Ireland | 14
Portugal | 12
30 June 2024– 11:34 – Sports Park Steinwiesenweg
France | 15
Germany | 0

Final
30 June 2024– 16:45 – Sports Park Steinwiesenweg
Ireland | 19
France | 14
3rd place final
30 June 2024– 15:48 – Sports Park Steinwiesenweg
Portugal | 14
Germany | 12

=== Final placings ===
| Place | Team |
|---|---|
| 1st place, gold medalist(s) | Ireland |
| 2nd place, silver medalist(s) | France |
| 3rd place, bronze medalist(s) | Portugal |
| 4 | Germany |
| 5 | Georgia |
| 6 | Italy |
| 7 | Spain |
| 8 | Belgium |
| 9 | Lithuania |
| 10 | Great Britain |
| 11 | Ukraine |
| 12 | Croatia |
