= 2022 Rugby Europe Sevens Championship Series =

Annual rugby sevens series

2022 Rugby Europe Sevens
- Series XX
- Hosts: Portugal; Poland
- Date: 25 June – 3 July 2022
- Nations: 10

Final positions
- Champions: Spain
- Runners-up: Germany
- Third: France

Team changes
- Promoted: Ireland, Great Britain, Romania
- Relegated: Poland

The 2022 Rugby Europe Sevens Championship Series was the twentieth edition of the annual rugby sevens series organised by Rugby Europe, the governing body of rugby union in Europe, played from June to July 2022. The first leg was played in Lisbon, Portugal, with the second leg in Krakow, Poland. Ten teams competed. There was a separate 2022 Rugby World Cup Sevens European Qualifier event held in Bucharest in July. Spain were the defending champions, having won the 2021 tournament. Spain repeated as champions of the Series having finished runner-up in Lisbon and first in Krakow.

== Teams ==
The current list of teams confirmed to be participating in the Sevens Championship Series. Russia were initially scheduled to participate, but following the 2022 Russian invasion of Ukraine, the World Rugby Executive Council suspended the Rugby Union of Russia.

France, who were originally to be relegated to the 2022 Trophy tournament as punishment for not fielding a team in the previous year's Championship tournament, accepted an invitation to take Russia's place.

Belgium and the Czech Republic were promoted from the 2021 Rugby Europe Sevens Trophy, as they were the two highest-ranked teams from the two-legged series.

- Belgium
- Czech Republic
- France
- Georgia
- Germany
- Italy
- Lithuania
- Poland
- Portugal
- Spain

== Tour venues ==
The schedule for the series was:

2022 Legs
Leg	Stadium	City	Dates	Winner
Portugal	Estádio Nacional	Lisbon	25–26 June	Germany
Poland	Municipal Stadium	Kraków	1–3 July	Spain

== Standings ==
2022 Rugby Europe Sevens Championship
Pos	Event Team	Lisbon	Kraków	Points total
1	Spain	18	20	38
2	Germany	20	16	36
3	France	12	18	30
4	Belgium	14	12	26
5	Italy	16	8	24
6	Portugal	10	14	24
7	Georgia	4	10	14
8	Lithuania	8	6	14
9	Czech Republic	6	4	10
10	Poland	3	3	6

Legend
Green fill	Champions and entry to European Games
Blue fill	Entry to European Games and World Challenger Series
No fill	Entry to European Games
Dark bar	Already a core team for the 2022–23 World Rugby Sevens Series
Yellow fill	Excluded from European Games
Red fill	Entry to European Games and relegated to 2023 European Trophy

== First leg – Lisbon ==
=== Pool stage ===
==== Pool A ====
Team	Pld	W	D	L	PF	PA	PD	Pts
Spain	4	4	0	0	136	54	+82	12
Belgium	4	3	0	1	73	55	+18	10
Portugal	4	2	0	2	69	64	+4	8
Czech Republic	4	1	0	3	62	110	-48	6
Georgia	4	0	0	4	38	95	-57	4

25 June
9:00 WEST (UTC+1)

Spain	19–14; Report	Belgium

Estádio Nacional

25 June
10:44 WEST (UTC+1)

Georgia	12–19; Report	Portugal

Estádio Nacional

25 June
12:30 WEST (UTC+1)

Spain	48–21; Report	Czech Republic

Estádio Nacional

25 June
13:14 WEST (UTC+1)

Georgia	7–14; Report	Belgium

Estádio Nacional

25 June
15:00 WEST (UTC+1)

Portugal	26–0; Report	Czech Republic

Estádio Nacional

25 June
15:44 WEST (UTC+1)

Spain	38–7; Report	Georgia

Estádio Nacional

25 June
17:22 WEST (UTC+1)

Portugal	12–21; Report	Belgium

Estádio Nacional

26 June
9:00 WEST (UTC+1)

Georgia	12–24; Report	Czech Republic

Estádio Nacional

26 June
9:44 WEST (UTC+1)

Spain	31–12; Report	Portugal

Estádio Nacional

26 June
11:00 WEST (UTC+1)

Czech Republic	17–24; Report	Belgium

Estádio Nacional

==== Pool B ====
Team	Pld	W	D	L	PF	PA	PD	Pts
Germany	4	4	0	0	130	19	+111	12
Italy	4	2	1	1	66	60	+6	9
France	4	2	0	2	99	70	+29	8
Lithuania	4	1	1	2	47	80	-33	7
Poland	4	0	0	4	37	150	-113	4

25 June
10:22 WEST (UTC+1)

Germany	35–7; Report	France

Estádio Nacional

25 June
11:06 WEST (UTC+1)

Lithuania	12–12; Report	Italy

Estádio Nacional

25 June
12:52 WEST (UTC+1)

Germany	40–5; Report	Poland

Estádio Nacional

25 June
13:36 WEST (UTC+1)

Lithuania	7–17; Report	France

Estádio Nacional

25 June
15:22 WEST (UTC+1)

Italy	33–5; Report	Poland

Estádio Nacional

25 June
16:06 WEST (UTC+1)

Germany	31–7; Report	Lithuania

Estádio Nacional

25 June
18:00 WEST (UTC+1)

Italy	21–19; Report	France

Estádio Nacional

26 June
9:22 WEST (UTC+1)

Lithuania	21–20; Report	Poland

Estádio Nacional

26 June
10:06 WEST (UTC+1)

Germany	24–0; Report	Italy

Estádio Nacional

26 June
11:22 WEST (UTC+1)

Poland	7–56; Report	France

Estádio Nacional

=== Ranking Games ===
==== Final ====
26 June
15:25 WEST (UTC+1)

Spain	7-21; Report	Germany

Estádio Nacional

==== 3rd-place play-off ====
26 June
14:55 WEST (UTC+1)

Belgium	14-21; Report	Italy

Estádio Nacional

==== 5th-place play-off ====
26 June
14:35 WEST (UTC+1)

Portugal	12-43; Report	France

Estádio Nacional

==== 7th-place play-off ====
26 June
15:10 WEST (UTC+1)

Czech Republic	5-24; Report	Lithuania

Estádio Nacional

==== 9th-place play-off ====
26 June
14:42 WEST (UTC+1)

Georgia	27-12; Report	Poland

Estádio Nacional

Results

== Second leg – Kraków ==
=== Pool stage ===
==== Pool A ====
Team	Pld	W	D	L	PF	PA	PD	Pts
Germany	4	4	0	0			+43	12
France	4	3	0	1			+27	10
Belgium	4	2	0	2			+27	8
Georgia	4	0	1	3			-35	5
Czech Republic	4	0	1	3			-62	5

==== Pool B ====
Team	Pld	W	D	L	PF	PA	PD	Pts
Portugal	4	3	0	1			+9	10
Spain	4	3	0	1			+33	10
Italy	4	2	0	2			+18	8
Lithuania	4	1	1	2			-5	7
Poland	4	0	1	3			-55	5

=== Knockout stage ===
==== 9th-10th playoff ====
9th place final
3 July
Czech Republic	21
Poland	19

==== 5th–8th playoffs ====
5th place semi finals
3 July
Belgium	34
Lithuania	0
3 July
Georgia	19
Italy	12

5th place final
3 July
Belgium	24
Georgia	7
7th place final
3 July
Lithuania	19
Italy	31

==== 1st-4th playoffs ====
Semi finals
3 July
Germany	10
Spain	31
3 July
France	26
Portugal	14

Final
3 July
Spain	29
France	7
Third
3 July
Germany	24
Portugal	14

== See also ==
- 2021–22 World Rugby Sevens Series
- 2022 Rugby World Cup Sevens
