= 2004 European Sevens Championship =

Tournament details
- Host nation: ESP
- Dates: –

Final positions
- Champions: Portugal

The 2004 European Sevens Championship was a rugby sevens competition, with the final held in Palma de Mallorca, Spain. It was the third edition of the European Sevens championship. The event was organised by rugby's European governing body, the FIRA – Association of European Rugby (FIRA-AER).

Final:

- Portugal, 21 - Italy, 14

== Final standings ==
| Rank | Team |
|---|---|
| 1st place, gold medalist(s) | Portugal |
| 2nd place, silver medalist(s) | Italy |
| 3rd place, bronze medalist(s) | Ireland |
| 4 | Scotland |
| 5 | France |
| 6 | Georgia |
| 7 | Russia |
| 8 | Spain |
| 9 | Lithuania |
| 10 | Romania |
| 11 | Ukraine |
| 12 | Moldova |
| 13 | Czech Republic |
| 14 | Poland |
| 15 | Germany |
| 16 | Croatia |
