= 2003 European Sevens Championship =

- Host nation: Germany
- Date: 16–17 August 2003

Cup
- Champion: Portugal
- Runner-up: France
- Third: Georgia

The 2003 European Sevens Championship was a rugby sevens competition, with the final held in Heidelberg, Germany (16 / 17 August 2003). It was the second edition of the European Sevens championship. This event was organised by rugby's European governing body, the FIRA – Association of European Rugby (FIRA-AER). In the final Portugal beat France 26 - 21.

== Qualification ==
Nine one-day qualifying rugby sevens competitions took place in Amsterdam, Netherlands (17 May 2003), Prague, Czech Republic (24 May 2003), Lunel, France (24 May 2003), Sopot, Poland (31 May 2003), Makarska, Croatia (7 June 2003), Madrid, Spain (14 June 2003), Lisbon, Portugal (21 June 2003), Budapest, Romania (28 June 2002), and Tbilisi, Georgia (28 June 2003). Following these competitions twelve teams consisting of Georgia, France, Portugal, Germany, Scotland, Croatia, Romania, Ukraine, Poland, Spain, Czech Republic, and Netherlands were deemed to have qualified for the European Sevens Championship hosted in Heidelberg, Germany (16-17 August 2003). However, before the tournament commenced Scotland withdrew and Switzerland replaced them.

== Heidelberg ==
Event	Winners	Score	Finalists	Semifinalists
Cup	Portugal	26–21	France	Georgia (Third); Germany
Plate	Ukraine	27–7	Netherlands	Spain (Seventh); Croatia
Bowl	Poland	31–24	Czech Republic	Romania (Eleventh); Switzerland

=== Pool Stage ===
Key to colours in group tables
Teams that advanced to the Cup Semifinal
Teams advanced to the Plate Semifinal
Teams advanced to the Bowl semifinal

==== Pool A ====
Team	Pld	W	D	L	PF	PA	PD	Pts
Georgia	5	4	0	1	128	43	+85	13
Germany	5	4	0	1	137	69	+68	13
Spain	5	4	0	1	105	53	+52	13
Croatia	5	2	0	3	62	86	–24	9
Poland	5	1	0	4	55	100	–45	7
Switzerland	5	0	0	5	34	170	–136	5

16 August 2003	Croatia	29–0	Switzerland
12:00

16 August 2003	Germany	19–12	Poland
12:40

16 August 2003	Georgia	10–12	Spain
13:20

16 August 2003	Poland	21–17	Switzerland
14:00

16 August 2003	Croatia	7–22	Spain
14:40

16 August 2003	Georgia	26–12	Germany
15:20

16 August 2003	Spain	38–0	Switzerland
16:00

16 August 2003	Georgia	26–12	Poland
16:40

16 August 2003	Germany	28–7	Croatia
17:20

16 August 2003	Poland	0–19	Spain
18:00

16 August 2003	Germany	42–10	Switzerland
18:40

16 August 2003	Georgia	26–0	Croatia
19:20

17 August 2003	Germany	36–14	Spain
10:00

17 August 2003	Croatia	19–10	Poland
10:40

17 August 2003	Georgia	40–7	Switzerland
11:20

==== Pool B ====
Team	Pld	W	D	L	PF	PA	PD	Pts
Portugal	5	5	0	0	180	26	+154	15
France	5	4	0	1	132	46	+86	13
Ukraine	5	3	0	2	98	62	+36	11
Netherlands	5	2	0	3	67	114	–47	9
Czech Republic	5	1	0	4	36	144	–108	7
Romania	5	0	0	5	26	147	–121	5

16 August 2003	Romania	14–21	Netherlands
12:20

16 August 2003	Portugal	24–14	Ukraine
13:00

16 August 2003	France	35–5	Czech Republic
13:40

16 August 2003	Ukraine	22–12	Netherlands
14:20

16 August 2003	Romania	7–17	Czech Republic
15:00

16 August 2003	France	5–24	Portugal
15:40

16 August 2003	Czech Republic	7–24	Netherlands
16:20

16 August 2003	France	21–7	Ukraine
17:00

16 August 2003	Portugal	38–0	Romania
17:40

16 August 2003	Ukraine	31–0	Czech Republic
18:20

16 August 2003	Portugal	47–0	Netherlands
19:00

16 August 2003	France	47–0	Romania
19:40

17 August 2003	Portugal	47–7	Czech Republic
10:20

17 August 2003	Romania	5–24	Ukraine
11:00

17 August 2003	France	24–10	Netherlands
11:40

=== Knockout stage ===
==== Bowl ====
Semi-finals
17 August 2003 – 12:40
Poland	12
Romania	7
17 August 2003 – 13:00
Czech Republic	33
Switzerland	5

Final
17 August 2003 – 15:20
Poland	31
Czech Republic	24
Eleventh Place
17 August 2003 – 15:00
Romania	24
Switzerland	5

==== Plate ====
Semi-finals
17 August 2003 – 13:20
Spain	12
Netherlands	17
17 August 2003 – 13:40
Ukraine	22
Croatia	5

Final
17 August 2003 – 15:45
Netherlands	7
Ukraine	27
Seventh Place
17 August 2003 – 16:05
Spain	15
Croatia	12

==== Cup ====
Semi-finals
17 August 2003 – 14:00
Georgia	10
France	32
17 August 2003 – 14:20
Portugal	31
Germany	7

Final
17 August 2003 – 16:50
France	21
Portugal	26
Third Place
17 August 2003 – 16:30
Georgia	28
Germany	24

== Standings ==
Rank	Team
1st place, gold medalist(s)	Portugal
2nd place, silver medalist(s)	France
3rd place, bronze medalist(s)	Georgia
4	Germany
5	Ukraine
6	Netherlands
7	Spain
8	Croatia
9	Poland
10	Czech Republic
11	Romania
12	Switzerland
