= 2002 European Sevens Championship =

- Host nation: Germany
- Date: 17–18 August 2002

Cup
- Champion: Portugal
- Runner-up: Georgia
- Third: Germany

Plate
- Winner: Lithuania
- Runner-up: Ukraine

Bowl
- Winner: Denmark
- Runner-up: Netherlands

The 2002 European Sevens Championship was a rugby sevens competition, with the final held in Heidelberg, Germany. It was the first edition of the European Sevens championship. The event was organised by rugby's European governing body, the FIRA – Association of European Rugby (FIRA-AER).

Portugal won the first edition by defeating Georgia 24-14 in the final.

== Qualification ==
FIRA – Association of European Rugby (FIRA-AER) organised five preliminary rugby sevens competitions in Lunel, France (17-18 May 2002), Amsterdam, Netherlands (25 May 2002), Madrid, Spain (15-16 June), Budapest, Romania (29-30 June 2002), and Sopot, Poland (20 July 2002). These competitions were intended to be applied as qualification tournaments in advance of the final in Heidelberg, Germany (17-18 August 2002). The twelve teams selected to have qualified based on points of participation and points by results in ranking order consisted of France, Portugal, Netherlands, Denmark, Georgia, Poland, Czech Republic, Croatia, Lithuania, Malta, Ukraine, and Germany. Sweden was added as a reserve team in the event of a cancellation. However Luxembourg was added to the tournament line-up to fill the vacancy created when Croatia pulled out and Sweden did not enter.

== Heidelberg ==
Event	Winners	Score	Finalists	Semifinalists
Cup	Portugal	24–14	Georgia	Germany (Third); France
Plate	Lithuania	24–10	Ukraine	Poland (Seventh); Malta
Bowl	Denmark	28–12	Netherlands	Czech Republic (Eleventh); Luxembourg

=== Pool Stage ===
Key to colours in group tables
Teams that advanced to the Cup Semifinal
Teams advanced to the Plate Semifinal
Teams advanced to the Bowl semifinal

==== Pool A ====
Team	Pld	W	D	L	PF	PA	PD	Pts
France	5	5	0	0	121	24	+97	15
Germany	5	3	0	2	118	74	+44	11
Lithuania	5	3	0	2	140	68	+72	11
Poland	5	2	0	3	82	57	+25	9
Denmark	5	2	0	3	71	118	–47	9
Luxembourg	5	0	0	5	14	205	–191	5

17 August 2002	Poland	7–26	Germany

17 August 2002	Denmark	7–47	Lithuania

17 August 2002	France	35–0	Luxembourg

17 August 2002	Lithuania	19–21	Germany

17 August 2002	Poland	42–0	Luxembourg

17 August 2002	France	31–0	Denmark

17 August 2002	Luxembourg	0–45	Germany

17 August 2002	France	19–12	Lithuania

17 August 2002	Denmark	0–19	Poland

17 August 2002	Lithuania	45–14	Luxembourg

17 August 2002	Denmark	26–21	Germany

17 August 2002	France	14–7	Poland

18 August 2002	Denmark	38–0	Luxembourg

18 August 2002	Poland	7–17	Lithuania

18 August 2002	France	22–5	Germany

==== Pool B ====
Team	Pld	W	D	L	PF	PA	PD	Pts
Portugal	5	4	0	1	133	36	+97	13
Georgia	5	4	0	1	123	38	+85	13
Ukraine	5	4	0	1	88	31	+57	13
Malta	5	2	0	3	53	115	–62	9
Netherlands	5	1	0	4	64	111	–47	7
Czech Republic	5	0	0	5	38	168	–130	5

17 August 2002	Czech Republic	0–31	Ukraine

17 August 2002	Netherlands	7–21	Georgia

17 August 2002	Portugal	38–0	Malta

17 August 2002	Georgia	7–14	Ukraine

17 August 2002	Czech Republic	12–24	Malta

17 August 2002	Portugal	40–7	Netherlands

17 August 2002	Malta	5–24	Ukraine

17 August 2002	Portugal	12–15	Georgia

17 August 2002	Netherlands	26–19	Czech Republic

17 August 2002	Georgia	24–5	Malta

17 August 2002	Netherlands	7–12	Ukraine

17 August 2002	Portugal	31–7	Czech Republic

18 August 2002	Netherlands	17–19	Malta

18 August 2002	Czech Republic	0–56	Georgia

18 August 2002	Portugal	12–7	Ukraine

=== Knockout stage ===
==== Bowl ====
Semi-finals
18 August 2002 – Heidelberg
Denmark	21
Czech Republic	12
18 August 2002 – Heidelberg
Luxembourg	7
Netherlands	28

Final
18 August 2002 – Heidelberg
Denmark	28
Netherlands	12
Eleventh Place
18 August 2002 – Heidelberg
Czech Republic	26
Luxembourg	12

==== Plate ====
Semi-finals
18 August 2002 – Heidelberg
Lithuania	43
Malta	0
18 August 2002 – Heidelberg
Poland	12
Ukraine	26

Final
18 August 2002 – Heidelberg
Lithuania	24
Ukraine	10
Seventh Place
18 August 2002 – Heidelberg
Malta	7
Poland	28

==== Cup ====
Semi-finals
18 August 2002 – Heidelberg
France	10
Georgia	12
18 August 2002 – Heidelberg
Germany	7
Portugal	19

Final
18 August 2002 – Heidelberg
Georgia	14
Portugal	24
Third Place
18 August 2002 – Heidelberg
France	7
Germany	19

== Standings ==
Rank	Team
1st place, gold medalist(s)	Portugal
2nd place, silver medalist(s)	Georgia
3rd place, bronze medalist(s)	Germany
4	France
5	Lithuania
6	Ukraine
7	Poland
8	Malta
9	Denmark
10	Netherlands
11	Czech Republic
12	Luxembourg
