= 2010 European Sevens Championship =

Tournament details
- Host nation: RUS
- Dates: 10 July – 11 July

Final positions
- Champions: Men: Portugal; Women: Spain
- Runner-up: Men: France; Women: Netherlands

The 2010 European Sevens Championship was a rugby sevens competition, with the final held in Moscow, Russia. It was the ninth edition of the European Sevens championship. The event was organised by rugby's European governing body, the FIRA – Association of European Rugby (FIRA-AER).

== Final standings ==
These are the final standings of the tournament:

Place	Men	Women
1st	Portugal	Spain
2nd	France	Netherlands
3rd	Russia	France
4th	Spain	Italy
5th	Georgia	England
6th	Romania	Russia
7th	Italy	Portugal
8th	Ukraine	Germany
9th	Moldova	Sweden
10th	Netherlands	Finland
11th	Lithuania	
12th	Poland	

== Results - Men ==
Semi-Final Bowl

- Moldova, 19 - Lithuania, 15
- Netherlands, 17 - Poland, 15

Semi-Final Plate

- Romania, 19 - Italy, 12
- Georgia, 12 - Ukraine, 5

Semi-Final Cup

- France, 19 - Russia, 5
- Portugal, 17 - Spain, 12

match for place 11

- Lithuania, 21 - Poland, 7

match for place 9 (Bowl-Final)

- Moldova, 21 - Netherlands, 12

match for place 7

- Ukraine, 24 - Italy, 17

match for place 5 (Plate-Final)

- Georgia, 59 - Romania, 0

match for place 3

- Russia, 22 - Spain, 10

Final: (Cup-Final)

- Portugal, 12 - France, 5
