= 2021 Rugby Europe Sevens Championship Series =

Rugby tournaments

- Hosts: Portugal; Russia
- Date: 5 June – 27 June
- Nations: 8

Final positions
- Champions: Spain
- Runners-up: Germany
- Third: Russia

The 2021 Rugby Europe Sevens Championship Series was the nineteenth edition of the continental championship for rugby sevens in Europe. The series featured eight international sides and took place over two legs, the first at Lisbon in Portugal and the second at Moscow in Russia. it served as a qualifier to the 2022 World Rugby Sevens Challenger Series.

Spain were crowned champions having won both the Lisbon and Moscow legs. England, France, Ireland, and Wales did not field teams for this tournament due to the postponement of the 2020 Summer Olympics which took place from 26 July to 31 July 2021 - where Great Britain (encompassing England and Wales) and Ireland participated - as well as national COVID restrictions in France.

As a penalty for competing in the Olympic tournament instead of this tournament, England, Ireland, and Wales were all relegated to the 2022 Trophy competition.

== Schedule ==
The official schedule for the 2021 Rugby Europe Sevens Championship Series was:

2021 Series schedule
Leg	Stadium	City	Dates	Winner
Portugal	Estádio Nacional	Lisbon	5–6 June	Spain
Russia	Luzhniki Stadium	Moscow	26–27 June	Spain

== Series standings ==
Final standings over the two legs of the Championship series:

2021 Rugby Europe Sevens Championship
Pos	Event Team	Lisbon	Moscow	Points total
1	Spain	20	20	40
2	Germany	18	16	34
3	Russia	16	14	30
4	Lithuania	8	18	26
5	Georgia	12	12	24
6	Portugal	14	8	22
7	Italy	10	10	20
8	Poland	6	6	12

== Lisbon ==
=== Pool stage ===
==== Pool A ====
Team	Pld	W	D	L	PF	PA	PD	Pts
Germany	2	2	0	0	55	5	+50	6
Portugal	2	2	0	0	45	17	+28	6
Georgia	2	0	0	2	10	48	−38	2
Lithuania	2	0	0	2	12	52	−40	2

==== Pool B ====
Team	Pld	W	D	L	PF	PA	PD	Pts
Spain	2	2	0	0	41	31	+10	6
Russia	2	1	0	1	31	26	+5	4
Italy	2	1	0	1	24	31	−7	4
Poland	2	0	0	2	31	39	−8	2

=== Knockout stage ===
==== 5th–8th playoffs ====
5th place semi finals
6 June – Estádio Nacional
Poland	0
Georgia	12
6 June – Estádio Nacional
Italy	21
Lithuania	12

5th place final
6 June – Estádio Nacional
Georgia	10
Italy	5
7th place final
6 June – Estádio Nacional
Poland	5
Lithuania	43

==== Championship playoffs ====
Quarter-finals
6 June – Estádio Nacional
Germany	17
Poland	7
6 June – Estádio Nacional
Russia	12
Georgia	5
6 June – Estádio Nacional
Portugal	33
Italy	7
6 June – Estádio Nacional
Spain	33
Lithuania	7

Semi-finals
6 June – Estádio Nacional
Germany	7
Russia	5
6 June – Estádio Nacional
Portugal	14
Spain	38

Final
6 June – Estádio Nacional
Germany	17
Spain	19
Third
6 June – Estádio Nacional
Russia	14
Portugal	12

==== Placings ====
Place	Team	Points
1st place, gold medalist(s)	Spain	20
2nd place, silver medalist(s)	Germany	18
3rd place, bronze medalist(s)	Russia	16
4	Portugal	14

Place	Team	Points
5	Georgia	12
6	Italy	10
7	Lithuania	8
8	Poland	6

== Moscow ==
=== Pool stage ===
==== Pool A ====
Team	Pld	W	D	L	PF	PA	PD	Pts
Portugal	3	3	0	0	74	33	+41	9
Spain	3	2	0	1	90	21	+69	7
Georgia	3	1	0	2	56	55	+1	5
Poland	3	0	0	3	0	111	−111	3

==== Pool B ====
Team	Pld	W	D	L	PF	PA	PD	Pts
Germany	3	2	1	0	60	26	+34	8
Russia	3	2	0	1	66	32	+35	7
Italy	3	1	1	1	54	38	+16	6
Lithuania	3	0	0	3	19	104	–85	3

=== Knockout stage ===
==== 5th–8th playoffs ====
5th place semi finals
27 June – Luzhniki Stadium
Portugal	12
Georgia	24
27 June – Luzhniki Stadium
Italy	43
Poland	0

5th place final
27 June – Luzhniki Stadium
Georgia	19
Italy	14
7th place final
27 June – Luzhniki Stadium
Portugal	48
Poland	0

==== Championship playoffs ====
Quarter-finals
27 June – Luzhniki Stadium
Portugal	22
Lithuania	28
27 June – Luzhniki Stadium
Russia	10
Georgia	5
27 June – Luzhniki Stadium
Spain	36
Italy	7
27 June – Luzhniki Stadium
Germany	42
Poland	5

Semi-finals
27 June – Luzhniki Stadium
Lithuania	21
Russia	19
27 June – Luzhniki Stadium
Spain	19
Germany	0

Final
27 June – Luzhniki Stadium
Lithuania	5
Spain	47
Third
27 June – Luzhniki Stadium
Russia	12
Germany	19

==== Placings ====
Place	Team	Points
1st place, gold medalist(s)	Spain	20
2nd place, silver medalist(s)	Lithuania	18
3rd place, bronze medalist(s)	Germany	16
4	Russia	14

Place	Team	Points
5	Georgia	12
6	Italy	10
7	Portugal	8
8	Poland	6
