= 2007 European Sevens Championship =

Tournament details
- Host nation: RUS
- Dates: –

Final positions
- Champions: Russia

The 2007 European Sevens Championship was a rugby sevens competition, with the final held in Moscow, Russia. It was the sixth edition of the European Sevens championship. The event was organised by rugby's European governing body, the FIRA – Association of European Rugby (FIRA-AER).

== Final standings ==
Rank	Team
1st place, gold medalist(s)	Russia
2nd place, silver medalist(s)	France
3rd place, bronze medalist(s)	Moldova
4	Spain
5	Romania
6	Italy
7	Georgia
8	Poland
9	Ukraine
10	Germany
11	Lithuania
12	Andorra
