= 2012 FIRA-AER Sevens Grand Prix Series =

- Hosts: France; Russia; Denmark
- Date: 2 June 2012 - 8 July 2012
- Nations: 16

Final positions
- Champions: England
- Runners-up: Portugal

Series details
- Top try scorer: (England) Nick Royle, (Wales) Tom Williams (GPS 1) (Wales) Williams Thomas (GPS 2) (Portugal) Duarte Moreira (GPS 3)

2012 Sevens Grand Prix Series was the 11th round of the Sevens Grand Prix Series (formerly known as the European Sevens Championship) for rugby sevens organised by the FIRA – Association of European Rugby. The series was held in three phases (GPS 1-3) hosted by France (Lyon), Russia (Moscow) and Denmark (Odense). The tournament was won by France, who defeated Portugal 21–12 in the final. England, winner of the first two phases of the tournament, were considered to be favourites but eliminated by France in the quarter-finals. England were the overall champions of the tournament.

== Qualification ==
The top 12 teams in 2011 qualified for GPS 1 in Lyon. Team rankings after GPS 1 decided the standings for GPS 2 in Moscow, which decided rankings for GPS 3. For GPS 3, Denmark got direct 16th spot and three more teams from Division A promoted for the Grand Prix Series.

GPS 1
#	Teams
1	Portugal
2	England
3	Spain
4	Russia
5	France
6	Georgia
7	Scotland
8	Italy
9	Wales
10	Ukraine
11	Netherlands
12	Germany

GPS 2
#	Teams
1	England
2	France
3	Russia
4	Spain
5	Portugal
6	Ukraine
7	Wales
8	Scotland
9	Germany
10	Italy
11	Georgia
12	Netherlands

GPS 3
#	Teams
1	England
2	France
3	Russia
4	Spain
5	Portugal
6	Ukraine
7	Wales
8	Scotland
9	Germany
10	Italy
11	Georgia
12	Netherlands
13	Romania
14	Belgium
15	Lithuania
16	Denmark

== Results ==
Date	Venue	Winner	Runner-up	Third	Ref
2–3 June	Matmut Stadium (Lyon)	England	Portugal	Spain	
30 June and 1 July	Luzhniki Stadium (Moscow)	England	France	Russia	
7–8 July	Odense Stadium, (Odense)	France	Portugal	Wales	

=== GPS 1 ===
The twelve teams were divided into two pools (A and B), with six members each. Each of the teams played with the other members in its pool once and then the two top teams in each of the two pools moved over to semifinals, the winners of which played against each other in the finals.

Portugal and England succeeded to final. Portugal lost only one pool (pool A) match against France with a points difference of nil to 31, whilst English team did not lose a single match. In the semifinals, England played against fellow home nation Wales and Portugal faced Spanish team. The final of Grand Prix Series 1 was played in between England and Portugal on 3 June 2012, which was won 14–26 by England and thus won the first leg of the 2012 Sevens Grand Prix Series.

Final match details

3 June 2012
17:26

Portugal	14–26	England
Try: Valente 4'; Leal 20'; Con: Leal 5'; Leal 20'	Report	Try: Vilk 2'; Vilk 10'; Brake 12'; Royle 16'; Con: Bibby 3'; Bibby 10'; Bibby 12'

Matmut Stadium
Referee: Alexander Ruiz

=== GPS 2 ===
The Grand Prix Series 2 held in Luzhniki Stadium, Moscow, on 30 June and 1 July 2012. England and France were the top teams of pool A and pool B, respectively. Both of the teams won all their pool matches. England defeated Spain in the semifinal with a points difference of 22 to 7, and France entered the final after winning the lowest-scoring match of the GPS 2 against Russia, winning the match by 7–0. The final of the GPS 2 held on 1 July between England and France, which was won by the English team by 21–15.

Final match details

1 July 2012
18:50

England	21–15	France
Try: Rodwell 1'; Bibby 8'; Bibby 16'; Con: Bibby 1'; Bibby 8'; Bibby 16'	Report	Try: Candelon 3'; Albaladejo 14'; Dall Igna 19'

Luzhniki Stadium
Referee: C. Passacantando

=== GPS 3 ===
Sixteen teams participated in the Grand Prix Series 3 held in Odense on 7 and 8 July 2012. It was the final phase of the 2012 Sevens Grand Prix Series. The sixteen teams were divided into four pools (A, B, C and D), with four members each. Each of the teams played with the other members in its pool once and then the two top teams in each of the four pools moved over to quarter-finals. The winner of each quarter-final match succeeded to semifinals and the winners of which played against each other in the finals.

England, winner of the first two rounds of the competition, were considered to be the favourites, but they lost to France in quarter-finals. In the final, France and Portugal competed for the Championship Cup. France, maintaining their winning streak, defeated Portugal by 21–12.

Final match details

8 July 2012
18:58

Portugal	12–21	France
Try: Moreira 16'; Valente 20'; Con: Leal 16'	Report	Try: Candelon 1'; Mazoue 3'; Dall Igna 9'; Con: Albaladejo 2'; Albaladejo 3'; Albaladejo 9'

Odense Stadium
Referee: Luke Pearce (England)

=== Final standings ===
#	Teams
1	England 50
2	Portugal 48
3	France 45
4	Spain 43
5	Wales 36
6	Russia 34
7	Scotland 22
8	Georgia 20
9	Ukraine 12
10	Italy 10
11	Germany 8 (-96)
12	Netherlands 8 (-187)
13	Belgium
14	Romania
15	Lithuania
16	Denmark
