= 2011 FIRA-AER Sevens Grand Prix Series =

Seven players european rugby competition

- Hosts: France; Russia; Spain; Romania
- Date: 18 June 2011 - 17 July 2011

Final positions
- Champions: Portugal
- Runners-up: England

Series details
- Top try scorer: (England) Nick Royle (35)
- Top point scorer: (England) Christian Lewis-Pratt (191)

The 2011 Sevens Grand Prix Series was the tenth edition of the European Sevens Championship.

== Format ==
The twelve best nations played 4 different tournaments in Lyon, Moscow, Barcelona and Bucharest. The team that finished with the most points was declared European Champion. The last two teams were relegated in Division A.

== Schedule ==
Date	Venue	Winner	Runner-up	Third
18–19 June	(France) Lyon (Stade Vuillermet)	England	Spain	France
25–26 June	(Russia) Moscow (Annex of Loujniki Stadium)	England	Portugal	Spain
9–10 July	(Spain) Barcelona (Olympic Stadium)	Russia	Italy	Portugal
16–17 July	(Romania) Bucharest (Arch of Triumph Stadium)	Portugal	Spain	France

== Standings ==
Legend
Champions
Relegated to 2012 European Sevens Division A (Trophy) Championship

Rank	Team	Lyon	Moscow	Barcelona	Bucharest	Points
1st place, gold medalist(s)	Portugal	14	16	15	18	63
2nd place, silver medalist(s)	England	18	18	14	12	62
3rd place, bronze medalist(s)	Spain	16	15	12	16	59
4	Russia	12	8	18	14	54
5	France	15	12	8	15	50
6	Georgia	8	14	3	10	35
7	Italy	4	6	16	8	34
8	Wales	10	10	4	6	30
9	Ukraine	3	3	10	4	20
10	Netherlands	6	1	6	2	15
11	Romania	2	4	2	3	11
12	Moldova	1	2	1	1	5

== Lyon ==
Event	Winners	Score	Finalists	Semifinalists
Cup	England	28–14	Spain	France (Third); Portugal
Plate	Russia	33–12	Wales	Georgia (Seventh); Netherlands
Bowl	Italy	19–5	Ukraine	Romania (Eleventh); Moldova

=== Pool Stage ===
Key to colours in group tables
Teams that advanced to the Cup Semifinal
Teams advanced to the Plate Semifinal
Teams advanced to the Bowl semifinal

==== Pool A ====
Team	Pld	W	D	L	PF	PA	PD	Pts
Spain	5	5	0	0	138	22	+116	15
Portugal	5	4	0	1	97	55	+42	13
Georgia	5	2	0	3	85	71	+14	9
Netherlands	5	2	0	3	64	101	–37	9
Ukraine	5	2	0	3	65	104	–39	9
Romania	5	0	0	5	29	125	–96	5

18 June 2011	Portugal	24–5	Netherlands

18 June 2011	Georgia	33–0	Romania

18 June 2011	Spain	29–0	Ukraine

18 June 2011	Portugal	21–14	Georgia

18 June 2011	Spain	41–0	Netherlands

18 June 2011	Ukraine	19–14	Romania

18 June 2011	Spain	26–10	Georgia

18 June 2011	Portugal	14–10	Romania

18 June 2011	Netherlands	21–17	Ukraine

18 June 2011	Spain	14–12	Portugal

18 June 2011	Ukraine	17–14	Georgia

18 June 2011	Netherlands	31–5	Romania

18 June 2011	Portugal	26–12	Ukraine

18 June 2011	Spain	28–0	Romania

18 June 2011	Georgia	14–7	Netherlands

==== Pool B ====
Team	Pld	W	D	L	PF	PA	PD	Pts
England	5	5	0	0	151	48	+103	15
France	5	4	0	1	125	64	+61	13
Wales	5	3	0	2	75	86	–11	11
Russia	5	2	0	3	74	79	–5	9
Italy	5	1	0	4	82	100	–18	7
Moldova	5	0	0	5	50	180	–130	5

18 June 2011	France	54–7	Moldova

18 June 2011	England	19–12	Wales

18 June 2011	Russia	19–0	Italy

18 June 2011	England	33–15	France

18 June 2011	Russia	36–7	Moldova

18 June 2011	Wales	24–21	Italy

18 June 2011	England	35–0	Russia

18 June 2011	France	15–5	Wales

18 June 2011	Italy	26–19	Moldova

18 June 2011	France	22–5	Russia

18 June 2011	Italy	19–21	England

18 June 2011	Wales	19–17	Moldova

18 June 2011	France	19–14	Italy

18 June 2011	Wales	15–14	Russia

18 June 2011	England	45–0	Moldova

=== Knockout stage ===
==== Bowl ====
Semi-finals
19 June 2011
Ukraine	36
Moldova	5
19 June 2011
Italy	28
Romania	12

Final
19 June 2011
Ukraine	5
Italy	19
Eleventh Place
19 June 2011
Moldova	7
Romania	33

==== Plate ====
Semi-finals
19 June 2011
Russia	24
Georgia	19
19 June 2011
Wales	34
Netherlands	0

Final
19 June 2011
Russia	33
Wales	12
Seventh Place
19 June 2011
Georgia	41
Netherlands	7

==== Cup ====
Semi-finals
19 June 2011
Spain	19
France	12
19 June 2011
England	33
Portugal	14

Final
19 June 2011
Spain	14
England	28
Third Place
19 June 2011
France	7
Portugal	0

== Moscow ==
Event	Winners	Score	Finalists	Semifinalists
Cup	England	24–12	Portugal	Spain (Third); Georgia
Plate	France	21–12	Wales	Russia (Seventh); Italy
Bowl	Romania	7–5	Ukraine	Moldova (Eleventh); Netherlands

=== Pool Stage ===
Key to colours in group tables
Teams that advanced to the Cup Semifinal
Teams advanced to the Plate Semifinal
Teams advanced to the Bowl Semifinal

==== Pool A ====
Team	Pld	W	D	L	PF	PA	PD	Pts
Portugal	5	5	0	0	160	50	+110	15
England	5	3	1	1	151	59	+92	12
Russia	5	3	1	1	100	47	+53	12
Italy	5	2	0	3	87	88	–1	9
Netherlands	5	1	0	4	47	177	–130	9
Moldova	5	0	0	5	29	153	–124	5

25 June 2011	England	35–7	Moldova

25 June 2011	Russia	26–0	Netherlands

25 June 2011	Portugal	31–5	Italy

25 June 2011	England	14–14	Russia

25 June 2011	Portugal	35–5	Moldova

25 June 2011	Italy	46–0	Netherlands

25 June 2011	Portugal	21–5	Russia

25 June 2011	England	48–5	Netherlands

25 June 2011	Italy	19–5	Moldova

25 June 2011	Portugal	28–21	England

25 June 2011	Russia	19–12	Italy

25 June 2011	Netherlands	28–12	Moldova

25 June 2011	England	33–5	Italy

25 June 2011	Portugal	45–14	Netherlands

25 June 2011	Russia	36–0	Moldova

==== Pool B ====
Team	Pld	W	D	L	PF	PA	PD	Pts
Spain	5	4	0	1	93	57	+36	13
Georgia	5	4	0	1	66	55	+11	13
Wales	5	2	1	2	98	94	+4	10
France	5	2	0	3	106	65	+41	9
Romania	5	1	1	3	73	116	–43	8
Ukraine	5	1	0	4	48	97	–49	7

25 June 2011	Romania	14–12	Spain

25 June 2011	Georgia	14–0	Wales

25 June 2011	France	26–5	Ukraine

25 June 2011	Spain	26–19	Wales

25 June 2011	France	40–7	Romania

25 June 2011	Georgia	14–12	Ukraine

25 June 2011	Wales	24–21	France

25 June 2011	Spain	24–5	Georgia

25 June 2011	Ukraine	17–14	Romania

25 June 2011	Spain	17–12	France

25 June 2011	Wales	29–7	Ukraine

25 June 2011	Georgia	21–12	Romania

25 June 2011	Spain	14–7	Ukraine

25 June 2011	Georgia	12–7	France

25 June 2011	Wales	26–26	Romania

=== Knockout stage ===
==== Bowl ====
Semi-finals
26 June 2011
Netherlands	0
Ukraine	7
19 June 2011
Romania	19
Moldova	17

Final
19 June 2011
Ukraine	5
Romania	7
Eleventh Place
19 June 2011
Netherlands	12
Moldova	19

==== Plate ====
Semi-finals
19 June 2011
Russia	19
France	20
19 June 2011
Italy	19
Wales	22

Final
19 June 2011
France	21
Wales	12
Seventh Place
19 June 2011
Russia	24
Italy	10

==== Cup ====
Semi-finals
19 June 2011
Portugal	24
Georgia	10
19 June 2011
England	24
Spain	14

Final
19 June 2011
Portugal	12
England	24
Third Place
19 June 2011
Georgia	0
Spain	27

== Barcelona ==
Event	Winners	Score	Finalists	Semifinalists
Cup	Russia	7–5	Italy	Portugal (Third); England
Plate	Spain	24–0	Ukraine	France (Seventh); Netherlands
Bowl	Wales	33–19	Georgia	Romania (Eleventh); Moldova

=== Pool Stage ===
Key to colours in group tables
Teams that advanced to the Cup Semifinal
Teams advanced to the Plate Semifinal
Teams advanced to the Bowl Semifinal

==== Pool A ====
Team	Pld	W	D	L	PF	PA	PD	Pts
England	5	5	0	0	130	40	+90	15
Italy	5	4	0	1	94	46	+48	13
France	5	3	0	2	73	46	+27	11
Netherlands	5	1	1	3	64	97	–33	8
Romania	5	1	0	4	38	120	–82	7
Georgia	5	0	1	4	33	83	–50	6

9 July 2011	England	26–7	Netherlands

9 July 2011	Italy	14–7	France

9 July 2011	Romania	12–7	Georgia

9 July 2011	England	20–7	France

9 July 2011	Netherlands	14–14	Georgia

9 July 2011	Italy	27–12	Romania

9 July 2011	France	12–0	Georgia

9 July 2011	England	22–12	Italy

9 July 2011	Netherlands	31–7	Romania

9 July 2011	England	33–7	Georgia

9 July 2011	France	26–0	Romania

9 July 2011	Italy	29–0	Netherlands

9 July 2011	England	29–7	Romania

9 July 2011	Italy	12–5	Georgia

9 July 2011	France	21–12	Netherlands

==== Pool B ====
Team	Pld	W	D	L	PF	PA	PD	Pts
Portugal	5	4	0	1	88	39	+49	13
Russia	5	4	0	1	108	40	+68	13
Spain	5	3	0	2	121	29	+92	11
Ukraine	5	2	0	3	46	89	+43	9
Moldova	5	1	0	4	47	177	–118	7
Wales	5	1	0	4	62	110	–48	7

9 July 2011	Portugal	28–0	Moldova

9 July 2011	Russia	17–7	Wales

9 July 2011	Spain	29–0	Ukraine

9 July 2011	Portugal	22–5	Wales

9 July 2011	Spain	40–0	Moldova

9 July 2011	Russia	27–7	Ukraine

9 July 2011	Spain	35–0	Wales

9 July 2011	Portugal	21–12	Russia

9 July 2011	Ukraine	14–7	Moldova

9 July 2011	Portugal	17–12	Spain

9 July 2011	Wales	31–15	Ukraine

9 July 2011	Russia	45–0	Moldova

9 July 2011	Ukraine	10–0	Portugal

9 July 2011	Russia	12–5	Spain

9 July 2011	Moldova	21–19	Wales

=== Knockout stage ===
==== Bowl ====
Semi-finals
10 July 2011
Romania	0
Wales	35
10 July 2011
Moldova	5
Georgia	24

Final
10 July 2011
Wales	33
Georgia	19
Eleventh Place
10 July 2011
Romania	17
Moldova	12

==== Plate ====
Semi-finals
10 July 2011
France	12
Ukraine	14
10 July 2011
Spain	36
Netherlands	0

Final
10 July 2011
Ukraine	0
Spain	24
Seventh Place
10 July 2011
France	28
Netherlands	21

==== Cup ====
Semi-finals
10 July 2011
England	14
Russia	17
10 July 2011
Portugal	7
Italy	12

Final
10 July 2011
Russia	7
Italy	5
Third Place
10 July 2011
England	19
Portugal	22

== Bucharest ==
Event	Winners	Score	Finalists	Semifinalists
Cup	Portugal	14–10	Spain	France (Third); Russia
Plate	England	29–7	Georgia	Italy (Seventh); Wales
Bowl	Ukraine	17–14	Romania	Netherlands (Eleventh); Moldova

=== Pool Stage ===
Key to colours in group tables
Teams that advanced to the Cup Semifinal
Teams advanced to the Plate Semifinal
Teams advanced to the Bowl Semifinal

==== Pool A ====
Team	Pld	W	D	L	PF	PA	PD	Pts
Spain	5	5	0	0	149	21	+128	15
Russia*	5	3	0	2	106	76	+30	11
England*	5	3	0	2	142	62	+80	11
Wales	5	2	1	2	102	105	–3	10
Netherlands	5	1	1	3	52	145	–93	8
Moldova	5	0	0	5	22	164	–142	5

* Head-to-Head Russia beat England

16 July 2011	Russia	26–0	Moldova

16 July 2011	Spain	26–0	Netherlands

16 July 2011	England	33–17	Wales

16 July 2011	Spain	40–14	Russia

16 July 2011	England	42–0	Moldova

16 July 2011	Netherlands	24–24	Wales

16 July 2011	Spain	24–0	England

16 July 2011	Russia	31–0	Netherlands

16 July 2011	Wales	33–10	Moldova

16 July 2011	Russia	21–15	England

16 July 2011	Spain	24–7	Wales

16 July 2011	Netherlands	28–12	Moldova

16 July 2011	Wales	21–14	Russia

16 July 2011	England	52–0	Netherlands

16 July 2011	Spain	35–0	Moldova

==== Pool B ====
Team	Pld	W	D	L	PF	PA	PD	Pts
Portugal	5	4	0	1	135	49	+86	13
France	5	4	0	1	95	59	+36	13
Georgia	5	3	0	2	66	61	+5	11
Italy	5	2	0	3	36	87	–51	9
Romania	5	2	0	3	68	87	–19	9
Ukraine	5	0	0	5	45	102	–57	5

16 July 2011	Italy	7–0	Romania

16 July 2011	France	14–5	Ukraine

16 July 2011	Portugal	14–5	Georgia

16 July 2011	Italy	17–12	Ukraine

16 July 2011	Romania	21–19	Portugal

16 July 2011	France	21–14	Georgia

16 July 2011	Portugal	31–14	Ukraine

16 July 2011	France	20–5	Italy

16 July 2011	Georgia	21–12	Romania

16 July 2011	Portugal	36–7	Italy

16 July 2011	Georgia	12–7	Ukraine

16 July 2011	France	33–12	Romania

16 July 2011	Georgia	19–0	Italy

16 July 2011	Portugal	28–7	France

16 July 2011	Romania	28–7	Ukraine

=== Knockout stage ===
==== Bowl ====
Semi-finals
17 July 2011
Netherlands	0
Ukraine	17
17 July 2011
Romania	26
Moldova	10

Final
17 July 2011
Ukraine	17
Romania	14
Eleventh Place
17 July 2011
Netherlands	28
Moldova	5

==== Plate ====
Semi-finals
17 July 2011
England	31
Italy	17
17 July 2011
Georgia	26
Wales	5

Final
17 July 2011
England	29
Georgia	7
Seventh Place
17 July 2011
Italy	14
Wales	5

==== Cup ====
Semi-finals
17 July 2011
Spain	19
France	12
17 July 2011
Portugal	19
Russia	7

Final
17 July 2011
Spain	10
Portugal	14
Third Place
17 July 2011
France	7
Russia	0

== Player scoring ==
=== Most points ===
#	Name	Points
1	Christian Lewis-Pratt (England)	191
2	Nick Royle (England)	175
3	Ignacio Martin (Spain)	166
4	Carl Murray (Portugal)	127
5	Leon Koenen (Netherlands)	126
6	Dimitry Perov (Russia)	108
7	Justin James (Wales)	96
8	Vitalii Krasnodemsky (Ukraine)	93
-	Pedro Martin (Spain)	93
10	Paul Albaladejo (France)	90

=== Most tries ===
#	Name	Tries
1	Nick Royle (England)	35
2	Pablo Feijoo (Spain)	17
3	Duarte Moreira (Portugal)	16
4	Vitalii Krasnodemsky (Ukraine)	15
-	Pedro Martin (Spain)	15
6	Fabrizio Sepe (Italy)	14
7	Daniel Norton (England)	13
-	Carl Murray (Portugal)	13
-	John Brake (England)	13
-	Irakli Genenava (Georgia)	13
-	Ignacio Martin (Spain)	13
-	Giorgi Kalmakhelidze (Georgia)	13

== New entries in 2012 ==
Because if its victory in Division A, Germany will play in Sevens Grand Prix Series in 2012. Scotland will also enter the competition in 2012. Romania and Moldova will play in Division A
