= 2009 European Sevens Championship =

European rugby tournament

Tournament details
- Host nation: GER
- Dates: 11 July – 12 July
- No. of nations: 13

Final positions
- Champions: Men: Russia; Women: England
- Runner-up: Men: France; Women: Spain

The 2009 European Sevens Championship was a rugby sevens competition, with the final held in Hanover, Germany. It was the eighth edition of the European Sevens championship and was organised by rugby's European governing body, the FIRA – Association of European Rugby (FIRA-AER).

The tournament differed from the previous seasons event as the number of participating men's teams had been reduced from twelve to ten. Instead, a women's tournament was held alongside the men's, also consisting of ten teams. The men's tournament was won by Russia, while England took out the women's title.

== Tournament history ==
From 2002, FIRA, the governing body of European rugby, has been organising an annual European Sevens Championship tournament. A number of qualifying tournaments lead up to a finals tournament, which functions as the European championship and, in 2008, also as the qualifying stage for the Sevens World Cup.

The first European Championship was held in 2002 in Heidelberg, Germany, and was won by Portugal, the team that won every men's championship since except 2007 and 2009, when Russia won. In 2003, the tournament was again held in Heidelberg and, in 2004, Palma de Mallorca, Spain was the host. From 2005 to 2007, Moscow was the host of the tournament.

Hanover held the tournament for the first time in 2008 and did so again in 2009. In 2010, the tournament will return to Moscow.

== Finals stadium ==
The 2008 and 2009 finals tournaments were held at the AWD-Arena in Hanover, home ground of the football club Hannover 96. The stadium holds 50.000 spectators, 43,000 of them on seats, the rest standing.

== Qualifying ==
A qualifying competition was held for the men's teams, with points allocated according to final placings in each tournament. Each nation was required to play two qualifying tournaments.

Ten teams qualified through the six qualifying tournaments, held at the following locations:

Location	Country	Date	Winner	Runner-up
Sopot	Poland	16–17 May	Portugal	Poland
Athens	Greece	23–24 May	France	Romania
Split	Croatia	30–31 May	France	Italy
Odesa	Ukraine	6–7 June	Russia	Moldova
Ostrava	Czech Republic	6–7 June	Portugal	Spain
Moscow	Russia	20–21 June	Italy	Moldova

== Final standings ==
These are the final standings of the tournament:

Place	Men	Women
1st	Russia	England
2nd	France	Spain
3rd	Italy	Netherlands
4th	Spain	Germany
5th	Georgia	France
6th	Moldova	Portugal
7th	Portugal	Russia
8th	Romania	Italy
9th	Germany	Sweden
10th	Poland	Moldova
