= 2005 European Sevens Championship =

Rugby sevens competition

Tournament details
- Host nation: RUS
- Dates: July 16, 2005 – July 17, 2005

Final positions
- Champions: Portugal
- Runner-up: Russia

The 2005 European Sevens Championship was a rugby sevens competition, with the final held in Moscow, Russia. It was the fourth edition of the European Sevens championship. The event was organised by rugby's European governing body, the FIRA – Association of European Rugby (FIRA-AER).

Final:

- Portugal, 28 - Russia, 26

== Final standings ==
Rank	Team
1st place, gold medalist(s)	Portugal
2nd place, silver medalist(s)	Russia
3rd place, bronze medalist(s)	Italy
4	France
5	Spain
6	Germany
7	Moldova
8	Romania
9	Lithuania
10	Georgia
11	Ukraine
12	Croatia
