= 2013 FIRA-AER Sevens Grand Prix Series =

Rugby tournament

- Hosts: France, Romania
- Date: 8 June - 22 September
- Nations: 12

Final positions
- Champions: England
- Runners-up: France
- Third: Russia

The 2013 Sevens Grand Prix Series was the 12th year of the annual rugby Sevens Grand Prix Series (formerly known as the European Sevens Championship) for rugby sevens organised by the FIRA – Association of European Rugby. The 2013 Series consisted of two tournaments, held in Lyon, France and Bucharest, Romania. England won both legs, winning the overall 2013 Series.

== Results ==
Date	Venue	Winner	Runner-up	Third
8–9 June	Lyon, France	England	Russia	France
21–22 September	Bucharest, Romania	England	France	Russia

=== Final standings ===
#	Teams
1	England
2	France
3	Russia
4	Portugal
5	Italy
6	Wales
7	Scotland
8	Georgia
9	Romania
10	Spain
11	Germany
12	Ukraine

- Ukraine was relegated to 2014 European Sevens Championship Division A.
