= 2014 Rugby Europe Sevens Grand Prix Series =

Rugby sevens tournament

- Hosts: France; Russia; England; Romania
- Date: 8 June - 21 September
- Nations: 12

Final positions
- Champions: France
- Runners-up: Scotland
- Third: England

2014 Sevens Grand Prix Series is the 13th round of the Sevens Grand Prix Series (formerly known as the European Sevens Championship) for rugby sevens organised by the FIRA – Association of European Rugby.

== Series ==
Date	Venue	Winner	Runner-up	Third
8–9 June	Lyon, France	France	Belgium	Spain
28–29 June	Moscow, Russia	England	Portugal	Scotland
13–14 September	Manchester, England	England	France	Russia
20–21 September	Bucharest, Romania	France	Spain	Scotland

=== Lyon ===
Event	Winners	Score	Finalists	Semifinalists
Cup	France	40–10	Belgium	Spain (Third); Russia
Plate	Scotland	21–15	Georgia	England (Seventh); Germany
Bowl	Italy	24-14	Wales	Portugal (Eleventh); Romania

=== Moscow ===
Event	Winners	Score	Finalists	Semifinalists
Cup	England	47–12	Portugal	Scotland (Third); Georgia
Plate	Wales	24–12	Russia	Belgium (Seventh); France
Bowl	Italy	22-0	Spain	Germany (Eleventh); Romania

=== Manchester ===
Event	Winners	Score	Finalists	Semifinalists
Cup	England	28–21	France	Russia (Third); Spain
Plate	Scotland	33–7	Belgium	Wales (Seventh); Germany
Bowl	Portugal	26-7	Romania	Italy (Eleventh); Georgia

=== Bucharest ===
Event	Winners	Score	Finalists	Semifinalists
Cup	France	21–17	Spain	Scotland (Third); Russia
Plate	Belgium	24–19	Wales	Germany (Seventh); England
Bowl	Georgia	12-7	Portugal	Italy (Eleventh); Romania

=== Grand Prix standings ===
Legend
Winner
Relegated to Division A for 2015

Rank	Team	Lyon	Moscow	Manchester	Bucharest	Points
1st place, gold medalist(s)	France	20	6	18	20	64
2nd place, silver medalist(s)	Scotland	12	15	12	15	54
3rd place, bronze medalist(s)	England	7	20	20	6	53
4	Russia	14	10	15	14	53
5	Spain	15	3	14	18	50
6	Belgium	18	7	10	12	47
7	Wales	3	12	7	10	32
8	Georgia	10	14	1	4	29
9	Portugal	2	18	4	3	27
10	Germany	6	2	6	7	21
11	Italy	4	4	2	2	12
12	Romania	1	1	3	1	6

Note: England finishes above Russia due to tiebreaker of highest point difference.
