= 2022 Rugby Europe Sevens Trophy =

- Hosts: Croatia; Hungary
- Date: 11–19 June 2022
- Nations: 12

Final positions
- Champions: Ireland
- Runners-up: England
- Third: Wales

Series details
- Matches played: 68

The 2022 Rugby Europe Sevens Trophy was the second division of Rugby Europe's 2022 sevens season. This edition was hosted by the cities of Zagreb and Budapest on 11–12 June and 18–19 June. The two highest-placed teams were promoted to the 2023 Championship series. The two teams with the fewest points were relegated to the 2023 Conference.

Ukraine was due to participate in this competition but withdrew following the Russian invasion of Ukraine. Denmark who had been relegated in the 2021 Trophy tournament were awarded their place. Additionally, England, Ireland, and Wales participated in this tournament following their relegation from the Championship Series due to their failing to field teams in the 2021 Championship competition and instead participating in the postponed 2020 Summer Olympics which took place from 26 July to 31 July 2021.

The best team in the rankings at the end of the series that had not already qualified for the 2022 Rugby World Cup Sevens European Qualifier was added to that event to be held in Bucharest in July.

Ireland won the competition and were promoted to the Championship along with second-place finishers England. Latvia and Bulgaria were relegated to the Conference.

== Schedule ==
Date	Venue	Stadium	Winner
11–12 June	Zagreb	NŠC Stjepan Spajić	Ireland
18–19 June	Budapest	Budapest Rugby Centre	Ireland

== Standings ==
Legend
Promoted to 2023 Championship
Relegated to 2023 Conference
Qualification to the 2022 European World Cup Qualifier

2022 Rugby Europe Sevens Trophy
Pos	Event Team	Zagreb	Budapest	Points total
1	Ireland	20	20	40
2	England	18	18	36
3	Wales	16	16	32
4	Romania	12	14	26
5	Hungary	14	8	22
6	Sweden	8	10	18
7	Croatia	3	12	15
8	Israel	10	4	14
9	Luxembourg	6	6	12
10	Denmark	4	1	5 (Note: Tie-breaker margin of points scored for and against in all matches: Denmark –121, Latvia –209.)
11	Latvia	2	3	5
12	Bulgaria	1	2	3

== First leg – Zagreb ==
All times in Central European Summer Time (UTC+02:00)

=== First leg – Pool Stage ===
==== First leg – Pool A ====
Team	Pld	W	D	L	PF	PA	PD	Pts
Ireland	3	3	0	0	144	7	+137	9
Romania	3	2	0	1	57	58	–1	7
Denmark	3	1	0	2	41	79	–38	5
Latvia	3	0	0	3	0	98	–98	3

11 June 2022
10:30

Ireland	53–0; Report	Denmark

11 June 2022
10:52

Romania	24–0; Report	Latvia

11 June 2022
13:30

Ireland	48–0; Report	Latvia

11 June 2022
13:52

Romania	26–15; Report	Denmark

11 June 2022
16:30

Ireland	43–7; Report	Romania

11 June 2022
16:52

Latvia	0–26; Report	Denmark

==== First leg – Pool B ====
Team	Pld	W	D	L	PF	PA	PD	Pts
Wales	3	3	0	0	123	19	+104	9
Hungary	3	2	0	1	68	76	–8	7
Israel	3	1	0	2	43	67	–24	5
Croatia	3	0	0	3	34	106	–72	3

11 June 2022
11:14

Wales	40–7; Report	Hungary

11 June 2022
11:36

Israel	19–10; Report	Croatia

11 June 2022
14:14

Wales	59–7; Report	Croatia

11 June 2022
14:36

Israel	19–33; Report	Hungary

11 June 2022
17:14

Wales	24–5; Report	Israel

11 June 2022
17:36

Croatia	17–28; Report	Hungary

==== First leg – Pool C ====
Team	Pld	W	D	L	PF	PA	PD	Pts
England	3	3	0	0	154	26	+128	9
Luxembourg	3	2	0	1	61	80	–19	7
Sweden	3	1	0	2	71	94	–23	5
Bulgaria	3	0	0	3	35	121	–86	3

11 June 2022
11:58

England	57–7; Report	Bulgaria

11 June 2022
12:20

Sweden	21–28; Report	Luxembourg

11 June 2022
14:58

England	45–0; Report	Luxembourg

11 June 2022
15:20

Sweden	31–14; Report	Bulgaria

11 June 2022
17:58

England	52–19; Report	Sweden

11 June 2022
18:20

Luxembourg	33–14; Report	Bulgaria

==== First leg – Ranking of third-placed teams ====
Team	Pld	W	D	L	PF	PA	PD	Pts
Sweden	3	1	0	2	71	94	–23	5
Israel	3	1	0	2	43	67	–24	5
Denmark	3	1	0	2	41	79	–38	5

=== First leg – Knockout stage ===
==== First leg – 9th–12th place playoff ====
Semi-finals
12 June – Stadion NŠC Stjepan Spajić
Denmark	24
Latvia	10
12 June – Stadion NŠC Stjepan Spajić
Croatia	26
Bulgaria	21

Ninth place
12 June – Stadion NŠC Stjepan Spajić
Denmark	29
Croatia	12
Eleventh place
12 June – Stadion NŠC Stjepan Spajić
Latvia	10
Bulgaria	5

==== First leg – 5th–8th place playoff ====
Semi-finals
12 June – Stadion NŠC Stjepan Spajić
Israel	17
Luxembourg	10
12 June – Stadion NŠC Stjepan Spajić
Sweden	12
Romania	40

Fifth place
12 June – Stadion NŠC Stjepan Spajić
Israel	7
Romania	12
Seventh place
12 June – Stadion NŠC Stjepan Spajić
Luxembourg	12
Sweden	26

==== First leg – Cup finals ====
Quarter-finals
12 June – Stadion NŠC Stjepan Spajić
Ireland	36
Israel	7
12 June – Stadion NŠC Stjepan Spajić
Hungary	26
Luxembourg	0
12 June – Stadion NŠC Stjepan Spajić
Wales	33
Sweden	21
12 June – Stadion NŠC Stjepan Spajić
England	19
Romania	10

Semi-finals
12 June – Stadion NŠC Stjepan Spajić
Ireland	52
Hungary	0
12 June – Stadion NŠC Stjepan Spajić
Wales	12
England	28

Final
12 June – Stadion NŠC Stjepan Spajić
Ireland	27
England	0
Third place
12 June – Stadion NŠC Stjepan Spajić
Hungary	7
Wales	39

== Second Leg – Budapest ==
All times in Central European Summer Time (UTC+02:00)

=== Second Leg – Pool Stage ===
==== Second Leg – Pool A ====
Team	Pld	W	D	L	PF	PA	PD	Pts
Ireland	3	3	0	0	128	7	+121	9
Sweden	3	2	0	1	46	81	–35	7
Bulgaria	3	1	0	2	34	77	–43	5
Israel	3	0	0	3	31	74	–43	3

18 June 2022
9:00

Ireland	38–0; Report	Bulgaria

18 June 2022
9:22

Israel	14–17; Report	Sweden

18 June 2022
13:24

Ireland	57–0; Report	Sweden

18 June 2022
13:46

Israel	10–24; Report	Bulgaria

18 June 2022
17:48

Ireland	33–7; Report	Israel

18 June 2022
18:10

Sweden	29–10; Report	Bulgaria

==== Second Leg – Pool B ====
Team	Pld	W	D	L	PF	PA	PD	Pts
England	3	3	0	0	143	0	+143	9
Romania	3	2	0	1	62	69	–7	7
Luxembourg	3	1	0	2	43	75	–32	5
Latvia	3	0	0	3	10	114	–104	3

18 June 2022
9:44

England	40–0; Report	Latvia

18 June 2022
10:06

Romania	24–7; Report	Luxembourg

18 June 2022
14:08

England	46–0; Report	Luxembourg

18 June 2022
14:30

Romania	38–5; Report	Latvia

18 June 2022
18:32

England	57–0; Report	Romania

18 June 2022
18:54

Luxembourg	36–5; Report	Latvia

==== Second Leg – Pool C ====
Team	Pld	W	D	L	PF	PA	PD	Pts
Wales	3	3	0	0	141	5	+136	9
Hungary	3	1	0	2	53	84	–31	5
Croatia	3	1	0	2	48	86	–38	5
Denmark	3	1	0	2	24	91	–67	5

18 June 2022
10:28

Wales	50–5; Report	Croatia

18 June 2022
10:50

Hungary	36–5; Report	Denmark

18 June 2022
14:52

Wales	41–0; Report	Denmark

18 June 2022
15:14

Hungary	17–29; Report	Croatia

18 June 2022
19:16

Wales	50–0; Report	Hungary

18 June 2022
19:38

Denmark	19–14; Report	Croatia

=== Second Leg – Ranking of third-placed teams ===
Team	Pld	W	D	L	PF	PA	PD	Pts
Luxembourg	3	1	0	2	43	75	–32	5
Croatia	3	1	0	2	48	86	–38	5
Bulgaria	3	1	0	2	34	77	–43	5

=== Second Leg – Knockout stage ===
==== Second Leg – 9th–12th place playoff ====
Semi-finals
19 June – Budapest Rugby Centre
Bulgaria	14
Latvia	19
19 June – Budapest Rugby Centre
Denmark	7
Israel	40

Ninth place
19 June – Budapest Rugby Centre
Latvia	7
Israel	10
Eleventh place
19 June – Budapest Rugby Centre
Bulgaria	31
Denmark	17

==== Second Leg – 5th–8th place playoff ====
Semi-finals
19 June – Budapest Rugby Centre
Croatia	24
Hungary	19
19 June – Budapest Rugby Centre
Luxembourg	17
Sweden	21

Fifth place
19 June – Budapest Rugby Centre
Croatia	26
Sweden	21
Seventh place
19 June – Budapest Rugby Centre
Hungary	17
Luxembourg	0

==== Second Leg – Cup finals ====
Quarter-finals
19 June – Budapest Rugby Centre
Ireland	57
Croatia	0
19 June – Budapest Rugby Centre
Romania	26
Hungary	17
19 June – Budapest Rugby Centre
England	33
Luxembourg	10
19 June – Budapest Rugby Centre
Wales	36
Sweden	7

Semi-finals
19 June – Budapest Rugby Centre
Ireland	54
Romania	0
19 June – Budapest Rugby Centre
England	24
Wales	5

Final
19 June – Budapest Rugby Centre
Ireland	35
England	14
Third place
19 June – Budapest Rugby Centre
Romania	14
Wales	31
