= England national rugby sevens team =

England
- Union: Rugby Football Union
- Emblem: Red Rose
- Coach: Tony Roques
- Captain: Tom Mitchell
- Top scorer: Ben Gollings (2,652 points)
- Most tries: Dan Norton (354 tries)
Team kit	Change kit

World Cup Sevens
- Appearances: 8 (First in 1993)
- Best result: Champions, 1993

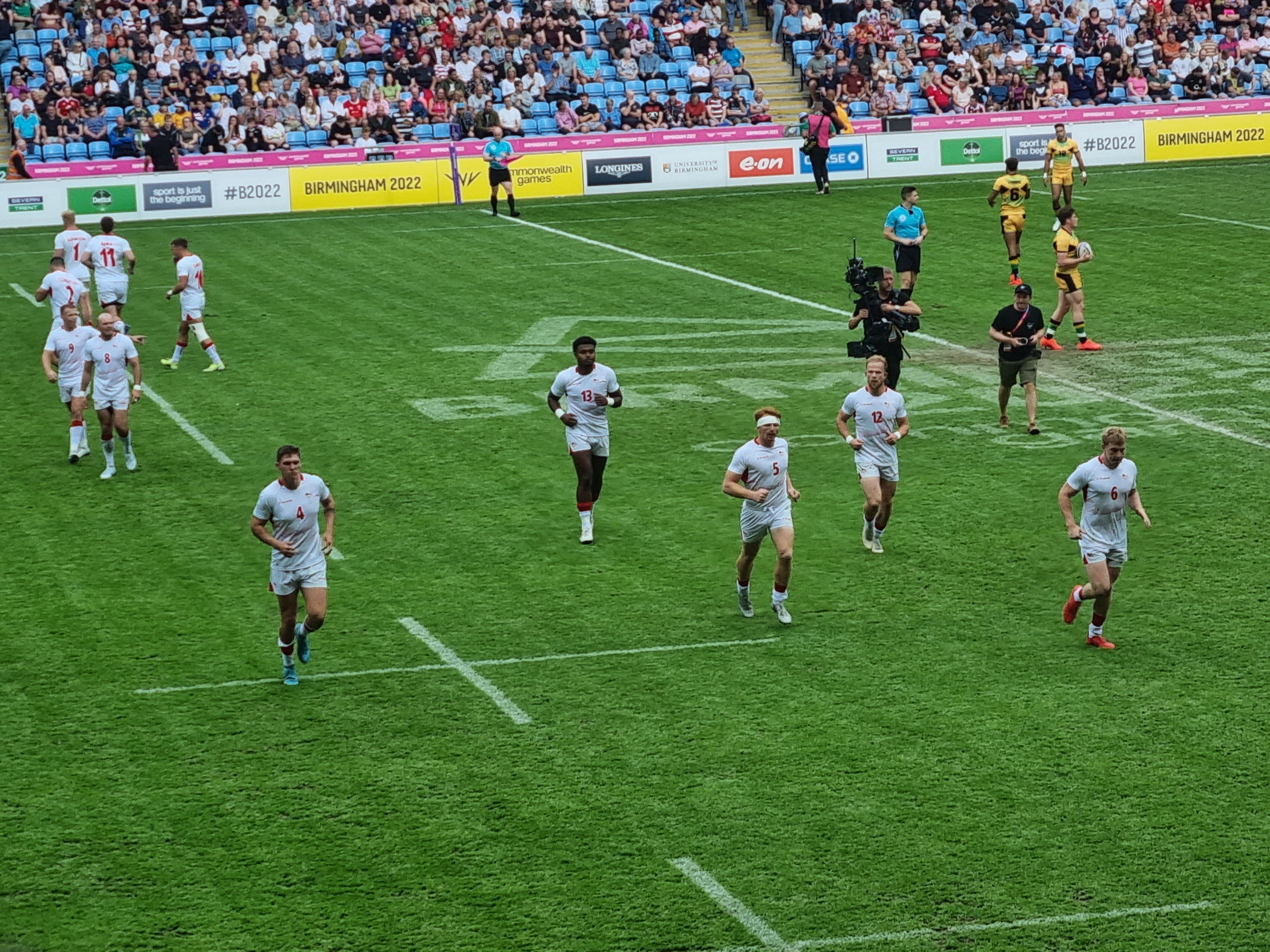
Team England at the 2022 Commonwealth Games.

The England national rugby sevens team competes in the Rugby World Cup Sevens and the Commonwealth Games. They have once won the Rugby World Cup Sevens — the inaugural tournament in 1993. Historically the team also competed in the World Rugby Sevens Series finishing in second place four times, most recently in the 2016-17 season. The team has been replaced by a combined Great Britain team in this competition.

The England Sevens team has generated several notable sevens players. Ben Gollings holds the record for points scored on the Sevens Series with 2,652 points. Dan Norton holds the record for tries scored on the Sevens Series with over 350 tries as of April 2020. England's Simon Amor (2004) and Ollie Phillips (2009) have each won a World Rugby Sevens Player of the Year award.

== History ==
England won the 1973 International Seven-a-side Tournament, the first sevens tournament with national representative sides, defeating Ireland 22–18 in the final.

== World Rugby Sevens Series ==
England is one of the more successful teams in the World Rugby Sevens Series. They have finished in the top three nine times — behind only New Zealand, Fiji, and South Africa.

Place	Number	Seasons
1st	0	—
2nd	4	2002–03, 2003–04, 2005–06, 2016–17
3rd	5	2001–02, 2004–05, 2008–09, 2010–11, 2011–12
4th	2	2013–14, 2014–15
5th	5	2006–07, 2007–08, 2009–10, 2017–18, 2018–19
6th	1	2012–13
7th	1	2000–01
8th	1	2015–16
9th	1	1999–00

== Quadrennial tournaments ==
=== Rugby World Cup Sevens ===
World Cup record
Year	Round	Position	Pld	W	L	D
(Scotland) 1993	Champions	1st	10	8	2	0
(Hong Kong) 1997	Quarterfinals	8th	5	4	1	0
(Argentina) 2001	Quarterfinals	6th	6	3	3	0
(Hong Kong) 2005	Semifinals	3rd	7	5	2	0
(United Arab Emirates) 2009	Quarterfinals	7th	4	3	1	0
(Russia) 2013	Runners-Up	2nd	6	5	1	0
(United States) 2018	Runners-up	2nd	4	3	1	0
(South Africa) 2022	Challenge Trophy Winners	9th	4	3	1	0
Total	1 Title	8/8	42	31	11	0

=== Commonwealth Games ===
Commonwealth record
Year	Round	Position	Pld	W	L	D
(Malaysia) 1998	Quarterfinals	6th	3	2	1	0
(England) 2002	Plate Winner	5th	6	5	1	0
(Australia) 2006	Runners-Up	2nd	6	5	1	0
(India) 2010	Semifinals	4th	6	4	2	0
(Scotland) 2014	Plate Winner	5th	6	4	2	0
(Australia) 2018	Semifinals	3rd	5	4	1	0
(England) 2022	9th Place Playoff	9th	6	4	2	0
Total	0 Titles	7/7	38	28	10	0

== European competition ==
Europe Sevens Grand Prix Series

Sevens GP record
Year	Position
2002–2010	Did not participate
(European Union) 2011	2nd
(European Union) 2012	1st
(France) (Romania) 2013	1st
(European Union) 2014	3rd
(European Union) 2015	3rd
2016	DNP*
2017	9th
2018	4th
2019	7th
Total	5/14

Note: In 2016, England did not enter a team in the Rugby Europe Grand Prix Sevens. Instead, Great Britain fielded a team.

== World Series tournaments ==
England won the following legs of the World Rugby Sevens Series:

- Hong Kong Sevens (2002, 2003, 2004, 2006)
- Dubai Sevens (2004, 2005, 2010, 2011)
- Australian Sevens (2003)
- South Africa Sevens (2003, 2016)
- USA Sevens (2006)
- Wellington Sevens (2009, 2013)
- Japan Sevens (2015)
- London Sevens (2003, 2004, 2009)
- Canada Sevens (2017)

== Players ==
=== Player records ===
The following shows leading career England players based on performance in the World Rugby Sevens Series. Players in bold are still active.

Tries scored
No.	Player	Tries
1	Dan Norton	358
2	Ben Gollings	220
3	Tom Mitchell	135
4	Richard Haughton	106
5	Tom Bowen	105

=== Award winners ===
==== World Rugby Awards ====
The following England Sevens players have been recognised at the World Rugby Awards since 2004:

World Rugby Men's 7s Player of the Year
Year	Nominees	Winners
2004	Simon Amor	**Simon Amor**
2004	Ben Gollings	**Simon Amor**
2006	Mathew Tait	—
2009	Ollie Phillips	**Ollie Phillips**
2010	Ben Gollings (2)	—
2012	Mathew Turner	—
2014	Tom Mitchell	—

==== Rugby Players' Association Player of the Year ====
The following players have been voted as the RPA England 7s Player of the Year since 2012:

RPA Player of the Year (2012–16)
Year	Winners	Ref
2012	Mathew Turner	
2013	Dan Norton	
2014	Tom Mitchell	
2015	Alex Gray	
2016	Dan Bibby	

RPA Player of the Year (2017–)
Year	Winners	Ref
2017	Richard de Carpentier	
2018	Ruaridh McConnochie	
2019	Will Muir	
2020	Ben Harris	

== See also ==
- Rugby Football Union
- England national rugby union team
