= 2001 Rugby World Cup Sevens =

Rugby tournament held in Argentina

Rugby World Cup Sevens
Argentina 2001

Tournament details
- Host nation: Rugby World Cup Sevens
- Dates: 26 January – 28 January
- No. of nations: 24

Final positions
- Champions: New Zealand
- Runner-up: Australia

The 2001 Rugby World Cup Sevens was the third edition of the Rugby World Cup Sevens and was held in Mar del Plata, Argentina. New Zealand defeated Australia to win the tournament for the first time. All the matches were played at Estadio José María Minella.

This was the first major rugby event ever held in South America, with great attendance in most of the matches.

== Teams ==
- Argentina (Hosts)
- Australia
- Canada
- Chile
- Chinese Taipei
- Cook Islands
- England
- Fiji (Holders)
- France
- Georgia
- Hong Kong
- Ireland
- Japan
- Kenya
- New Zealand
- Portugal
- Russia
- Samoa
- South Africa
- South Korea
- Spain
- United States
- Wales
- Zimbabwe

== Group stage ==
Key to colours in group tables
Teams advanced to the Cup quarter-final
Teams advanced to the Plate quarter-final
Teams advanced to the Bowl quarter-final

=== Pool A ===
Teams	Pld	W	D	L	PF	PA	+/−	Pts
Fiji	5	5	0	0	159	36	+123	15
Argentina	5	4	0	1	157	59	+98	13
South Korea	5	2	1	2	106	101	+5	10
Russia	5	2	0	3	59	108	−49	9
Ireland	5	1	1	3	72	131	−59	8
Kenya	5	0	0	5	48	166	−118	5

=== Pool B ===
Teams	Pld	W	D	L	PF	PA	+/−	Pts
South Africa	5	5	0	0	143	19	+124	15
Canada	5	3	0	2	111	60	+51	11
Cook Islands	5	3	0	2	69	67	+2	11
Georgia	5	2	0	3	62	77	−15	9
France	5	2	0	3	73	69	+4	9
Chinese Taipei	5	0	0	5	21	187	−166	5

=== Pool C ===
Teams	Pld	W	D	L	PF	PA	+/−	Pts
New Zealand	5	5	0	0	175	14	+161	15
England	5	3	0	2	92	52	+40	11
Spain	5	3	0	2	66	62	+4	11
Japan	5	3	0	2	43	100	−57	11
Chile	5	1	0	4	36	83	−47	7
Zimbabwe	5	0	0	5	38	139	−101	5

=== Pool D ===
Teams	Pld	W	D	L	PF	PA	+/−	Pts
Australia	5	5	0	0	172	22	+150	15
Samoa	5	4	0	1	139	101	+38	13
Wales	5	2	1	2	86	89	−3	10
United States	5	2	0	3	68	130	−62	9
Portugal	5	1	1	3	79	110	−31	8
Hong Kong	5	0	0	5	29	121	−92	5

== Play Offs ==
=== Bowl ===
Quarter-finals
Ireland	24
Chinese Taipei	19
Portugal	19
Zimbabwe	14
Chile	19
Hong Kong	14
France	7
Kenya	12

Semi-finals
Ireland	12
Portugal	26
Chile	35
Kenya	12

Final
Portugal	19
Chile	21

=== Plate ===
Quarter-finals
South Korea	19
Georgia	24
Wales	21
Japan	7
Spain	21
United States	5
Cook Islands	10
Russia	26

Semi-finals
Georgia	17
Wales	10
Spain	7
Russia	26

Final
Georgia	12
Russia	24

=== Cup ===
Quarter-finals
Fiji	21
Canada	5
Australia	33
England	5
New Zealand	45
Samoa	7
South Africa	12
Argentina	14

Semi-finals
Fiji	14
Australia	22
New Zealand	31
Argentina	7

Final
Australia	12
New Zealand	31

2001 Rugby World Cup Sevens winners

New Zealand
1st title
