= Czech Republic national rugby sevens team =

Czech Republic
- Union: Czech Rugby Union
- Coach: Antonín Brabec
Team kit

World Cup
- Appearances: 0

The Czech Republic national rugby sevens team is a minor national sevens side.

== History ==
Their most notable achievement to date was in 2001, when they won the Bowl final of the Sri Lanka Sevens.

=== European Championship ===
The Czechs made their first European Championship appearance at Heidelberg in 2002, where they finished 11th out of a possible 12. In 2003, when the final tournament was again at Heidelberg, they finished 10th. The following year saw the tournament, which also doubled as qualifiers for the 2005 Rugby World Cup Sevens, at Palma de Majorca in Spain, with the team claiming the Shield after beating Poland 17-5. They haven't qualified for the Championship again since that particular tournament.

=== European Championship results ===
Year	Place
2002	11th
2003	10th
2004	13th (Note: Also served as qualifiers for the 2005 Rugby World Cup Sevens.)
2005	not qualified
2006	not qualified
2007	not qualified
2008	not qualified
2009	not qualified

== Results ==
=== 2008 ===
Rugby Sevens – Czech internationals in 2008
Date	Location	Opposition	Result	Tournament
31 May - 1 June	Zagreb	Romania	7-12	2008 Zagreb Sevens
31 May - 1 June	Zagreb	Netherlands	14-21	2008 Zagreb Sevens
31 May - 1 June	Zagreb	Croatia	7-21	2008 Zagreb Sevens
31 May - 1 June	Zagreb	Bosnia and Herzegovina	0-12	2008 Zagreb Sevens
14 - 15 June	Ostrava	Spain	12-14	2008 Ostrava Sevens
14 - 15 June	Ostrava	Croatia	12-21	2008 Ostrava Sevens
14 - 15 June	Ostrava	Portugal	0-31	2008 Ostrava Sevens
14 - 15 June	Ostrava	Switzerland	**34-10**	2008 Ostrava Sevens

=== 2009 ===
Rugby Sevens – Czech internationals in 2009
Date	Location	Opposition	Result	Tournament
16 - 17 May	Sopot	Georgia	12-14	2009 Sopot Sevens
16 - 17 May	Sopot	Denmark	5-21	2009 Sopot Sevens
16 - 17 May	Sopot	Poland	0-46	2009 Sopot Sevens
16 - 17 May	Sopot	Norway	12-12	2009 Sopot Sevens
6 - 7 June	Ostrava	Portugal	21-54	2009 Ostrava Sevens (Note: A second Czech team played in Group B in the place of Azerbaijan, who withdrew.)
6 - 7 June	Ostrava	Belgium	**33-12**	2009 Ostrava Sevens
6 - 7 June	Ostrava	Netherlands	10-26	2009 Ostrava Sevens
6 - 7 June	Ostrava	Monaco	14-14	2009 Ostrava Sevens

- Czech wins in **bold**.

== Current players ==
Squad for 2008 Zagreb Sevens:

1. Ota Hejmala (Zlín)
2. Jan Rudolf (Petrovice)
3. Jakub Procházka (Tatra Smíchov)
4. Jan Frýdl (Tatra Smíchov)
5. Václav Jursík (Sparta Prague)
6. Michal Schlanger (Petrovice)
7. Jan Konečný (Bystrc)
8. Petr Okleštěk (Auxerre, France)
9. Michal Ouředník (Sparta Prague/ARC Iuridica)
10. Antonín Brabec (Tatra Smíchov) (player-coach)
