= Lithuania national rugby sevens team =

Men's national team representing in Rugby Sevens

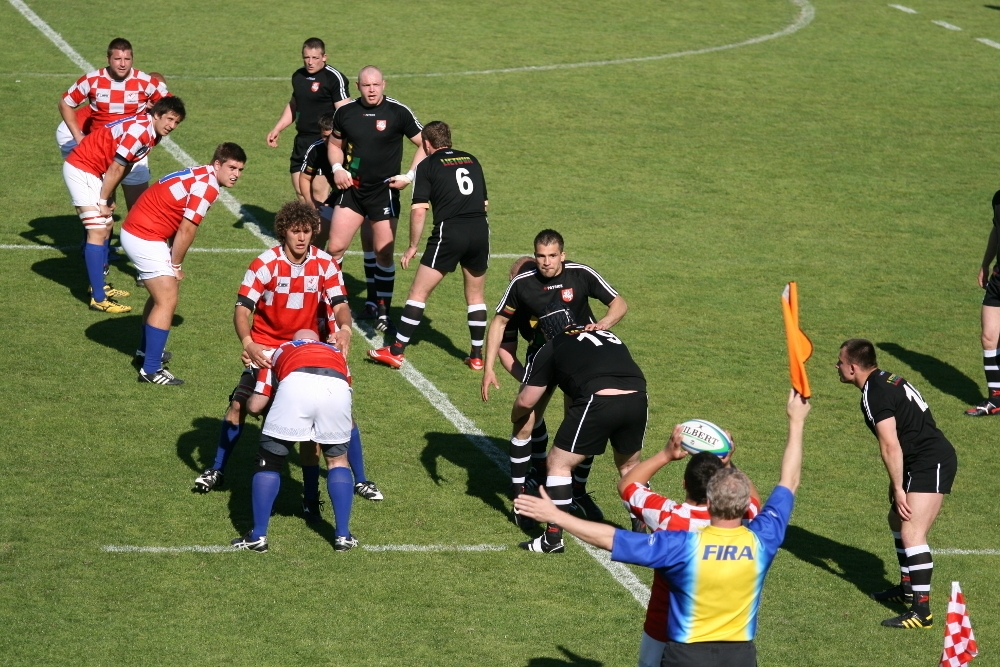
Lithuania vs. Croatia

The Lithuania national rugby sevens team is a minor national sevens side. They won the Bowl in the 2005 FIRA European Sevens in Moscow.

== Tournament history ==
=== Summer Olympics ===
Olympic Games record
Year	Round	Position	Pld	W	L	D
(Brazil) 2016	Did not qualify					
(Japan) 2020	To be determinated					
Total	0 Titles	0/2	-	-	-	-

=== Rugby World Cup Sevens ===
World Cup record
Year	Round	Position	Pld	W	L	D
(Scotland) 1993	Did not qualify					
(Hong Kong) 1997	Did not qualify					
(Argentina) 2001	Did not qualify					
(Hong Kong) 2005	Did not qualify					
(United Arab Emirates) 2009	Did not qualify					
(Russia) 2013	Did not qualify					
(United States) 2018	Did not qualify					
Total	0 Titles	2/7	10	2	8	0

=== European Grand Prix Series ===
Sevens Grand Prix Series record
Year	Position	Pld	W	L	D
2011	Did not qualify				
2012	15th				
2013	Did not qualify				
2014	Did not qualify				
2015	9th				
2016	10th				
2017	Did not qualify				
2018	Did not qualify				
Total	3/8				
