= Netherlands national rugby sevens team =

Netherlands
- Union: Dutch Rugby Union
Team kit

World Cup Sevens
- Appearances: 1 (First in 1993)
- Best result: 21st place, 1993

The Netherlands national rugby sevens team is a minor national sevens side. They have competed in the Hong Kong Sevens since the 1980s.

== Tournament History ==
=== Rugby World Cup Sevens ===
Rugby World Cup Sevens Record
Year	Round	Position	Pld	W	L	D
(Scotland) 1993	Group stage	21st	5	0	5	0
(Hong Kong) 1997	Did not qualify					
(Argentina) 2001	Did not qualify					
(Hong Kong) 2005	Did not enter					
(United Arab Emirates) 2009	Did not enter					
(Russia) 2013	Did not qualify					
(United States) 2018	Did not enter					
Total	0 Titles	1/7	5	0	5	0

== Hong Kong Sevens ==
In the 1988 Hong Kong Sevens, one of their players, Marcel Bierman, broke his neck in a tackle, subsequently requiring a wheelchair as an assistive device.

In the 1989 Hong Kong Sevens, they beat Bahrain by a large margin: 24-4. That year the team had the distinction of including four brothers: Hans, Andre, Mats and Peter Marcker.

Bill McLaren was particularly impressed by Bart Wierenga

"the player who made the biggest impression was a gangly lad with a head of hair like a wind-blown thatched cottage, Bart Wierenga, who ran his heart out in a series of tingling performances."

On the team's lap of honour, Wierenga wheeled Marcel Bierman around the pitch, to loud cheers and claps from the audience.

== Hong Kong Sevens ==
Year	Venue	Cup			Plate	
Year	Venue	Winner	Final Score	Runner-up	Winner	Runner-up
1989; Details	Government Stadium	New Zealand	22-10	Australia	Tonga	Netherlands

== See also ==
- Rugby union in the Netherlands
- Netherlands national rugby union team
