= Poland national rugby sevens team =

Poland Sevens
- Union: Polish Rugby Union
- Nickname: Biało-czerwoni
- Coach: Chris Davies
| Team kit | Change kit |

Official website
- polskie.rugby/strona/13/kalendarz-seniorzy-7

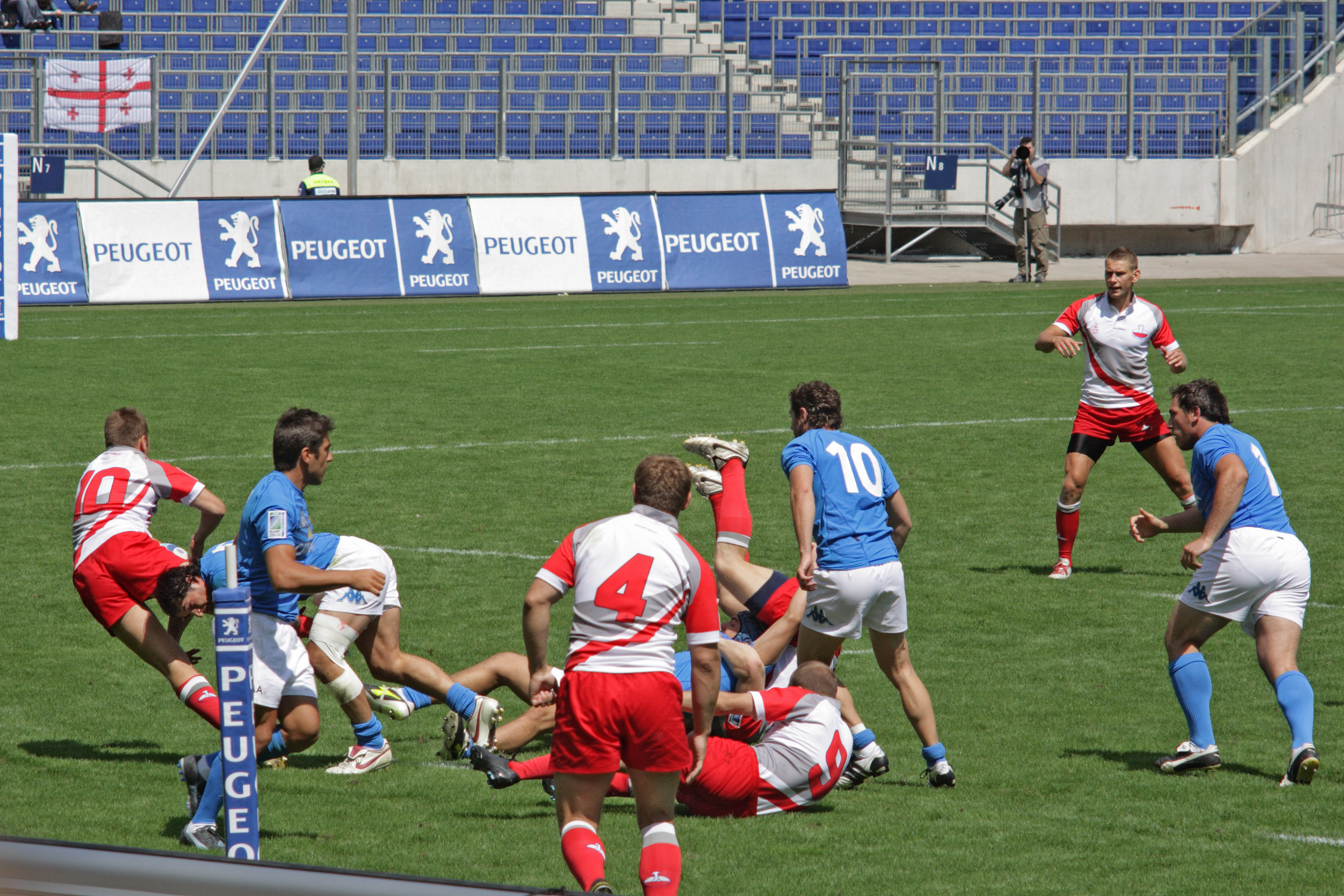
European Sevens 2008 (Hannover Sevens), Italy vs Poland

The Poland national rugby sevens team is a minor national sevens side. They compete in Europe’s Sevens Grand Prix Series.

== 2008 Hannover Sevens ==
Group B matches -

| | WAL | IRE | ITA | UKR | POL | Bel |
|---|---|---|---|---|---|---|
| Wales | – | 26–14 | 33–12 | 21–17 | 38–7 | 33–12 |
| Ireland | – | – | 17–12 | 26–7 | 17–7 | 31–0 |
| Italy | – | – | – | 31–15 | 40–0 | 17–10 |
| Ukraine | – | – | – | – | 21–14 | 22–12 |
| Poland | – | – | – | – | – | 21–19 |
| Ukraine | – | – | – | – | – | – |

| Team | Pld | W | D | L | PF | PA | +/– | Pts |
|---|---|---|---|---|---|---|---|---|
| Wales | 5 | 5 | 0 | 0 | 151 | 64 | +87 | 15 |
| Ireland | 5 | 4 | 0 | 1 | 105 | 54 | +51 | 13 |
| Italy | 5 | 3 | 0 | 2 | 114 | 75 | +39 | 11 |
| Ukraine | 5 | 2 | 0 | 3 | 84 | 104 | –20 | 9 |
| Poland | 5 | 1 | 0 | 4 | 49 | 135 | –86 | 7 |
| Belgium | 5 | 0 | 0 | 5 | 53 | 124 | –71 | 5 |

The speed advisor or the speed coach of the "Olympic team 2016" is Mr. Marcin Urbas, 200 m PB 19.98s.
