= Ukraine national rugby sevens team =

National rugby team of Ukraine

Ukraine
- Union: National Rugby Federation of Ukraine
- Coach: Michel Bishop
Team kit

Official website
- www.rugby.org.ua

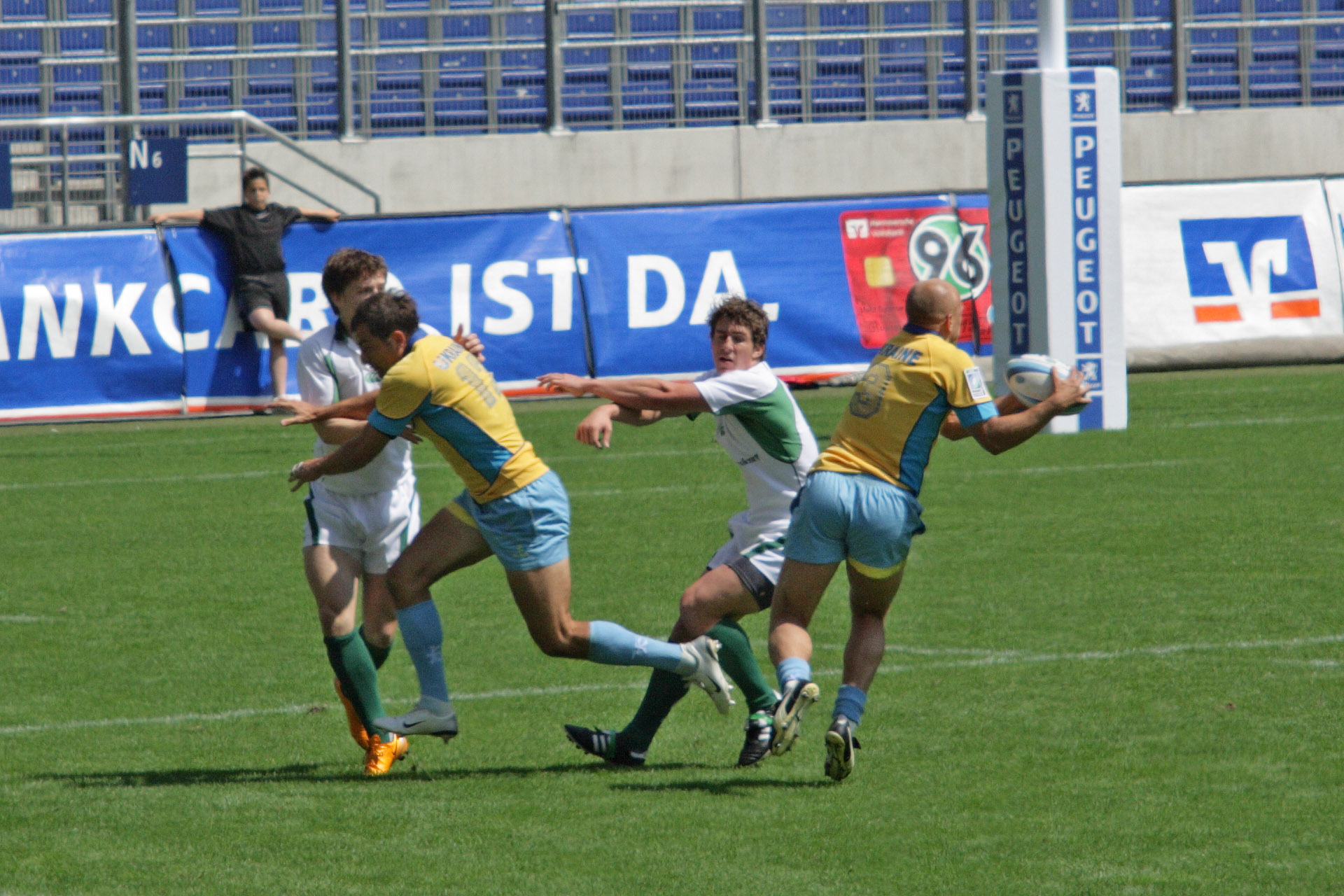
Oleg Kvasnitsa intercepts the ball from Ireland in 2008

The Ukraine national rugby sevens team is a minor national sevens side.

== 2008 Hannover Sevens ==
Group B matches -

	WAL	IRE	ITA	UKR	POL	Bel
Wales	–	26-14	33-12	21-17	38-7	33-12
Ireland	–	–	17-12	26-7	17-7	31-0
Italy	–	–	–	31-15	40-0	17-10
Ukraine	–	–	–	–	21-14	22-12
Poland	–	–	–	–	–	21-19
Ukraine	–	–	–	–	–	–

Team	Pld	W	D	L	PF	PA	+/-	Pts
Wales	5	5	0	0	151	64	+87	15
Ireland	5	4	0	1	105	54	+51	13
Italy	5	3	0	2	114	75	+39	11
Ukraine	5	2	0	3	84	104	-20	9
Poland	5	1	0	4	49	135	-86	7
Belgium	5	0	0	5	53	124	-71	5

== Current squad ==
Head coach: Michel Bishop

Player	Club
Ruslan Tserkovnyy	(Ukraine) Kredo-63 Odesa
Vitaly Orlov	(Russia) Enisey-STM
Maksim Kravchenko	(Ukraine) Olimp Kharkov
Sergey Tserkovnyy	(Ukraine) Olimp Kharkov
George Gegidze	(Ukraine) Kredo-63 Odesa
Oleg Kvasnitsa	(Ukraine) Obolon-Universitet Khmelnitskiy
Jaba Malaguradze	(Ukraine) Kredo-63 Odesa
Vyacheslav Ponamorenko	(Ukraine) Olimp Kharkov
Alexandr Lubyy	(Ukraine) Olimp Kharkov
Giorgi Todradze	(Ukraine) Kredo-63 Odesa
Bogdan Zhulavskyi	(Ukraine) Kredo-63 Odesa

Source:"Team Ukraine". Hannover Sevens website.
