= Georgia national rugby sevens team =

Georgia
- Union: Georgian Rugby Union
- Nickname: The Lelos ბორჯღალოსნები
- Emblem: Crepuscular Rays
- Coach: Besik Khamashuridze
- Top scorer: Zurab Dzneladze
- Most tries: Ramaz Kharazishvili
Team kit	Change kit

World Cup Sevens
- Appearances: 4 (First in 2001)
- Best result: 10th (2001)

The Georgia national rugby sevens team is a minor national sevens side. They have featured at the Rugby World Cup Sevens on four occasions and compete annually at the Rugby Europe Sevens. They have occasionally qualified for the World Rugby Sevens Series, but they have never been a 'core team' on the Sevens Series. Georgia has participated qualifying tournaments for the Olympics, but have never qualified.

Georgia qualified for the 2024 World Rugby Sevens Challenger Series in Dubai. In round one of the tournament, they were beaten by Hong Kong in the seventh place playoff and finished eighth. They completed the overall Challenger Series in eighth place.

== Players ==
12-member squad for the 2024 World Rugby Sevens Challenger Series in Dubai.

No.	Players
1	Nikoloz Rekhviashvili
2	Giorgi Tchuadze
3	Saba Imedadze
4	Soso Matiashvili
5	Sergi Chkhaidze
6	Tornike Akubardia
7	Teimuraz Kokhodze
8	Luka Alibegashvili
9	Saba Archvadze
10	Giorgi Jobava
11	Gaga Kevkhishvili
12	Romani Makhatadze

== Tournament history ==
=== Rugby World Cup Sevens ===
World Cup record
Year	Round	Position	Pld	W	L	D
(Scotland) 1993	Did not qualify					
(Hong Kong) 1997	Did not qualify					
(Argentina) 2001	Plate Finals	10th	8	4	4	0
(Hong Kong) 2005	Plate Semifinals	11th	7	2	4	1
(United Arab Emirates) 2009	Bowl Quarter-Finals	21st	4	0	4	0
(Russia) 2013	Bowl Semifinals	19th	5	1	4	0
(United States) 2018	Did not qualify					
(South Africa) 2022	Did not qualify					
Total	0 Titles	4/6	24	7	16	1

=== World Rugby Sevens Series ===
Tournament	Round	Position
(England) 2007	Shield Semi-final	NA
(Scotland) 2007	Shield Semi-final	NA
