= 2019 Rugby Europe Sevens Conference =

- Hosts: Serbia
- Date: 8–9 June 2019
- Nations: 16

Final positions
- Champions: Hungary
- Runners-up: Turkey
- Third: Moldova

Series details
- Matches played: 48

The 2019 Rugby Europe Sevens Conference was the third divisions of Rugby Europe's 2019 sevens season. It was held in Belgrade, Serbia on 8–9 June 2019, with the top two advancing to the 2020 Sevens Trophy. As winner of the tournament, Hungary advances to the European qualifying tournament for the 2020 Summer Olympics.

== Pool stage ==
All times in Central European Summer Time (UTC+02:00)

=== Pool A ===
Team	Pld	W	D	L	PF	PA	PD	Pts
Hungary	3	3	0	0	110	17	+93	9
Netherlands	3	2	0	1	79	29	+50	7
Austria	3	1	0	2	55	72	–17	5
Slovakia	3	0	0	3	0	126	–126	3

8 June 2019
10:00

Hungary	17–5	Netherlands

Referee: Pedro Mendes Silva (Portugal)

8 June 2019
10:22

Austria	31–0	Slovakia

Referee: Gert Visser (Netherlands)

8 June 2019
13:18

Austria	12–31	Netherlands

Referee: Mike Hawkins (Denmark)

8 June 2019
13:40

Hungary	52–0	Slovakia

Referee: Vicenzo Schipani (Italy)

8 June 2019
16:36

Slovakia	0–43	Netherlands

Referee: Thibault Santamaria (France)

8 June 2019
16:58

Hungary	41–12	Austria

Referee: Alexei Lebedev (Russia)

=== Pool B ===
Team	Pld	W	D	L	PF	PA	PD	Pts
Monaco	3	2	1	0	92	38	+54	8
Finland	3	2	0	1	64	50	+14	7
Cyprus	3	1	1	1	59	48	+11	6
Liechtenstein	3	0	0	3	36	115	–79	3

8 June 2019
10:44

Cyprus	24–12	Liechtenstein

Referee: Mike Hawkins (Denmark)

8 June 2019
11:06

Monaco	19–10	Finland

Referee: Vicenzo Schipani (Italy)

8 June 2019
14:02

Monaco	52–7	Liechtenstein

Referee: Gert Visser (Netherlands)

8 June 2019
14:24

Cyprus	14–15	Finland

Referee: Matej Rzaga (Czech Republic)

8 June 2019
17:20

Finland	39–17	Liechtenstein

Referee: Matej Rzaga (Czech Republic)

8 June 2019
17:42

Cyprus	21–21	Monaco

Referee: Vicenzo Schipani (Italy)

=== Pool C ===
Team	Pld	W	D	L	PF	PA	PD	Pts
Moldova	3	3	0	0	116	21	+95	9
Switzerland	3	2	0	1	95	26	+69	7
Montenegro	3	1	0	2	40	100	–60	5
Slovenia	3	0	0	3	24	128	–104	3

8 June 2019
11:28

Moldova	43–0	Montenegro

Referee: Thibault Santamaria (France)

8 June 2019
11:50

Slovenia	0–41	Switzerland

8 June 2019
14:46

Slovenia	17–33	Montenegro

Referee: Thibault Santamaria (France)

8 June 2019
15:04

Moldova	19–14	Switzerland

Referee: Alexei Lebedev (Russia)

8 June 2019
18:03

Switzerland	40–7	Montenegro

Referee: Gert Visser (Netherlands)

8 June 2019
18:25

Moldova	54–7	Slovenia

Referee: Mike Hawkins (Denmark)

=== Pool D ===
Team	Pld	W	D	L	PF	PA	PD	Pts
Turkey	3	3	0	0	93	5	+88	9
Norway	3	2	0	1	45	53	–8	7
Serbia	3	1	0	2	42	48	–6	5
Andorra	3	0	0	3	5	79	–74	3

8 June 2019
12:08

Serbia	15–19	Norway

Referee: Alexei Lebedev (Russia)

8 June 2019
12:32

Turkey	26–5	Andorra

Referee: Pedro Mendes Silva (Portugal)

8 June 2019
15:28

Turkey	38–0	Norway

Referee: Pedro Mendes Silva (Portugal)

8 June 2019
15:51

Serbia	27–0	Andorra

Referee: Mike Hawkins (Denmark)

8 June 2019
18:46

Andorra	0–26	Norway

Referee: Thibault Santamaria (France)

8 June 2019
19:07

Serbia	0–29	Turkey

Referee: Pedro Mendes Silva (Portugal)

== Knockout stage ==
=== Cup ===
Quarter-finals
9 June 2019 – 10:26
Hungary	24
Norway	0
9 June 2019 – 10:50
Moldova	43
Finland	0
9 June 2019 – 11:12
Turkey	14
Netherlands	12
9 June 2019 – 11:34
Monaco	14
Switzerland	31

Semi-finals
9 June 2019 – 14:51
Hungary	24
Moldova	7
9 June 2019 – 15:13
Turkey	19
Switzerland	14

Final
9 June 2019 – 18:40
Hungary	43
Turkey	0
Third place
9 June 2019 – 18:20
Moldova	24
Switzerland	19

=== 5-8th Place ===
Semi-finals
9 June 2019 – 14:07
Norway	15
Finland	22
9 June 2019 – 14:28
Netherlands	28
Monaco	14

Fifth place
9 June 2019 – 17:58
Finland	7
Netherlands	38
Seventh place
9 June 2019 – 17:36
Norway	24
Monaco	12

=== 9-12th Place ===
Quarter-finals
9 June 2019 – 9:00
Austria	29
Andorra	10
9 June 2019 – 9:22
Montenegro	19
Liechtenstein	5
9 June 2019 – 9:44
Serbia	22
Slovakia	0
9 June 2019 – 10:06
Cyprus	33
Slovenia	14

Semi-finals
9 June 2019 – 13:23
Austria	40
Montenegro	19
9 June 2019 – 13:45
Serbia	7
Cyprus	19

Ninth place
9 June 2019 – 17:14
Austria	5
Cyprus	22
Eleventh place
9 June 2019 – 16:52
Montenegro	24
Serbia	29

=== 13-16th Place ===
Semi-finals
9 June 2019 – 12:29
Andorra	28
Liechtenstein	5
9 June 2019 – 12:51
Slovakia	24
Slovenia	10

Thirteenth place
9 June 2019 – 16:30
Andorra	17
Slovakia	0
Fifteenth place
9 June 2019 – 16:08
Liechtenstein	24
Slovenia	19

== Standings ==
Legend
Promoted to 2021 Trophy
and 2019 Olympic qualifying tournament
Promoted to 2021 Trophy

Rank	Team
1st place, gold medalist(s)	Hungary
2nd place, silver medalist(s)	Turkey
3rd place, bronze medalist(s)	Moldova
4	Switzerland
5	Netherlands
6	Finland
7	Norway
8	Monaco
9	Cyprus
10	Austria
11	Serbia
12	Montenegro
13	Andorra
14	Slovakia
15	Liechtenstein
16	Slovenia
