= 2001 Rugby World Cup Sevens qualifying =

The qualification process of men's teams for the 2001 Rugby World Cup Sevens. Automatic qualification was extended to the host and the eight quarterfinalists of the previous World Cup. The remaining spots were contested in each of the five regions' respective tournaments.

== Qualified teams ==
Africa	Americas	Asia	Europe	Oceania
Automatic qualification
South Africa	Argentina (hosts)	South Korea	England; France	Australia; Fiji; New Zealand; Samoa
Regional Qualifiers
Kenya; Zimbabwe	Canada; Chile; United States	Chinese Taipei; Hong Kong; Japan	Georgia; Ireland; Portugal; Russia; Spain; Wales	Cook Islands

== Africa ==
Africa had two tournaments as a qualifier. First on 29 April was a preliminary round-robin tournament in Abidjan where Ivory Coast and Tunisia finished the highest. They then joined ten other teams in Nairobi for a 23–24 June tournament. Kenya and Zimbabwe both advance as finalists of the tournament.

=== Qualifier 1 (Abidjan) ===
Teams	Pld	W	D	L	PF	PA	+/–	Pts
Ivory Coast	3	3	0	0	66	22	+44	9
Tunisia	3	2	0	1	36	17	+19	7
Morocco	3	1	0	2	52	26	+26	5
Cameroon	3	0	0	3	12	101	–89	3

Matches

29 April 2000

Ivory Coast	12–10	Tunisia

29 April 2000

Morocco	40–7	Cameroon

29 April 2000

Ivory Coast	12–7	Morocco

29 April 2000

Tunisia	19–0	Cameroon

29 April 2000

Ivory Coast	42–5	Cameroon

29 April 2000

Tunisia	7–5	Morocco

=== Qualifier 2 (Nairobi) ===
==== Day 1 ====
Pool A

Teams	Pld	W	D	L	PF	PA	+/–	Pts
Madagascar	3	2	0	1	69	26	+43	7
Kenya	3	2	0	1	68	31	+37	7
Uganda	3	2	0	1	50	26	+24	7
Kazakhstan	3	0	0	3	0	104	–104	3

Matches

24 June 2000

Kenya	35–0	Kazakhstan

24 June 2000

Madagascar	12–7	Uganda

24 June 2000

Madagascar	43–0	Kazakhstan

24 June 2000

Kenya	14–17	Uganda

24 June 2000

Kenya	19–14	Madagascar

24 June 2000

Uganda	26–0	Kazakhstan

Pool B

Teams	Pld	W	D	L	PF	PA	+/–	Pts
Zimbabwe	3	3	0	0	94	5	+89	9
Tunisia	3	2	0	1	62	21	+41	7
Botswana	3	1	0	2	17	68	–51	5
Eswatini	3	0	0	3	12	91	–79	3

Matches

24 June 2000

Botswana	17–5	Eswatini

24 June 2000

Zimbabwe	14–5	Tunisia

24 June 2000

Tunisia	22–7	Eswatini

24 June 2000

Zimbabwe	28–0	Botswana

24 June 2000

Zimbabwe	52–0	Eswatini

24 June 2000

Tunisia	35–0	Botswana

Pool C

Teams	Pld	W	D	L	PF	PA	+/–	Pts
Namibia	3	2	1	0	108	28	+89	8
Ivory Coast	3	2	0	1	94	31	+63	7
Zambia	3	1	1	1	56	47	+9	6
Bosnia and Herzegovina	3	0	0	3	12	164	–152	3

Matches

24 June 2000

Zambia	42–7	Bosnia and Herzegovina

24 June 2000

Namibia	26–14	Ivory Coast

24 June 2000

Ivory Coast	26–0	Zambia

24 June 2000

Namibia	68–0	Bosnia and Herzegovina

24 June 2000

Ivory Coast	54–5	Bosnia and Herzegovina

24 June 2000

Namibia	14–14	Zambia

==== Day 2 ====
Pool A

Teams	Pld	W	D	L	PF	PA	+/–	Pts
Zimbabwe	2	2	0	0	80	5	+75	6
Zambia	2	1	0	1	26	55	–29	4
Kazakhstan	2	0	0	2	15	61	–46	2

Matches

25 June 2000

Zimbabwe	40–0	Kazakhstan

25 June 2000

Zambia	21–15	Kazakhstan

25 June 2000

Zimbabwe	40–5	Zambia

Pool B

Teams	Pld	W	D	L	PF	PA	+/–	Pts
Namibia	2	2	0	0	73	7	+66	6
Uganda	2	1	0	1	73	17	+56	4
Bosnia and Herzegovina	2	0	0	2	0	122	–122	2

Matches

25 June 2000

Uganda	66–0	Bosnia and Herzegovina

25 June 2000

Namibia	17–7	Uganda

25 June 2000

Namibia	56–0	Bosnia and Herzegovina

Pool C

Teams	Pld	W	D	L	PF	PA	+/–	Pts
Kenya	2	2	0	0	43	5	+38	6
Madagascar	2	1	0	1	14	12	+2	4
Eswatini	2	0	0	2	10	50	–40	2

Matches

25 June 2000

Madagascar	14–5	Eswatini

25 June 2000

Kenya	36–5	Eswatini

25 June 2000

Kenya	7–0	Madagascar

Pool D

Teams	Pld	W	D	L	PF	PA	+/–	Pts
Tunisia	2	2	0	0	54	12	+42	6
Ivory Coast	2	1	0	1	26	45	–19	4
Botswana	2	0	0	2	24	47	–23	2

Matches

25 June 2000

Ivory Coast	21–17	Botswana

25 June 2000

Tunisia	26–7	Botswana

25 June 2000

Tunisia	28–5	Ivory Coast

Knockout Round

Semi-finals
25 June 2000
Zimbabwe	21
Tunisia	0
25 June 2000
Namibia	5
Kenya	14

Final
25 June 2000
Zimbabwe	26
Kenya	14
Third place
25 June 2000
Tunisia	21
Namibia	33

== Americas ==
The Americas had two tournaments to serve as a qualifier. First was a 22–23 January tournament in Port of Spain for the Caribbean zone, from which Trinidad and Tobago emerged victorious. It then joins another nine teams in a deciding inter-Americas tournament in Santiago for three spots on 6-7 May.

=== Qualifier 1 (Port of Spain) ===
Pool A

Teams	Pld	W	D	L	PF	PA	+/–	Pts
Trinidad and Tobago	3	3	0	0	90	17	+73	9
Bermuda	3	2	0	1	55	24	+31	7
Guyana	3	1	0	2	41	41	+0	5
Saint Lucia	3	0	0	3	10	114	–104	3

Matches

22 January 2000

Trinidad and Tobago	19–12	Bermuda

22 January 2000

Guyana	36–5	Saint Lucia

22 January 2000

Trinidad and Tobago	19–5	Guyana

22 January 2000

Bermuda	26–5	Saint Lucia

22 January 2000

Trinidad and Tobago	52–0	Saint Lucia

22 January 2000

Bermuda	17–0	Guyana

Pool B

Teams	Pld	W	D	L	PF	PA	+/–	Pts
Cayman Islands	3	2	0	1	66	38	+28	7
Jamaica	3	2	0	1	53	38	+15	7
Bahamas	3	1	0	2	41	60	–19	5
Barbados	3	1	0	2	31	55	–24	5

Matches

22 January 2000

Jamaica	15–7	Barbados

22 January 2000

Cayman Islands	24–12	Bahamas

22 January 2000

Jamaica	19–24	Bahamas

22 January 2000

Cayman Islands	35–7	Barbados

22 January 2000

Jamaica	19–7	Cayman Islands

22 January 2000

Barbados	17–5	Bahamas

Knockout Round

Quarter-finals
23 January 2000
Trinidad and Tobago	26
Barbados	12
23 January 2000
Guyana	0
Jamaica	19
23 January 2000
Bermuda	29
Bahamas	0
23 January 2000
Saint Lucia	0
Cayman Islands	40

Semi-finals
23 January 2000
Trinidad and Tobago	21
Jamaica	19
23 January 2000
Bermuda	21
Cayman Islands	0

Final
23 January 2000
Trinidad and Tobago	22
Bermuda	10

=== Qualifier 2 (Santiago) ===
Pool A

Teams	Pld	W	D	L	PF	PA	+/–	Pts
Canada	4	4	0	0	167	5	+162	12
United States	4	3	0	1	135	33	+102	10
Trinidad and Tobago	4	2	0	2	61	82	–21	8
Colombia	4	1	0	3	33	144	–111	6
Peru	4	0	0	4	12	144	–132	4

Matches

6 May 2000

Canada	43–0	Peru

6 May 2000

United States	39–0	Colombia

6 May 2000

Trinidad and Tobago	20–0	Peru

6 May 2000

Canada	57–0	Colombia

6 May 2000

United States	36–5	Trinidad and Tobago

6 May 2000

Colombia	26–12	Peru

6 May 2000

Canada	39–0	Trinidad and Tobago

6 May 2000

United States	55–0	Peru

6 May 2000

Trinidad and Tobago	36–7	Colombia

6 May 2000

Canada	28–5	United States

Pool B

Teams	Pld	W	D	L	PF	PA	+/–	Pts
Uruguay	4	4	0	0	120	19	+101	12
Chile	4	3	0	1	141	17	+124	10
Paraguay	4	2	0	2	64	124	–60	8
Brazil	4	1	0	3	29	102	–73	6
Venezuela	4	0	0	4	28	120	–92	4

Matches

6 May 2000

Chile	43–0	Venezuela

6 May 2000

Brazil	12–19	Paraguay

6 May 2000

Uruguay	29–7	Venezuela

6 May 2000

Chile	50–7	Paraguay

6 May 2000

Uruguay	33–7	Brazil

6 May 2000

Paraguay	38–14	Venezuela

6 May 2000

Chile	43–0	Brazil

6 May 2000

Uruguay	48–0	Paraguay

6 May 2000

Brazil	10–7	Venezuela

6 May 2000

Uruguay	10–5	Chile

Knockout Round

Quarter-finals
7 May 2000
Canada	59
Colombia	0
7 May 2000
United States	24
Trinidad and Tobago	7
7 May 2000
Uruguay	34
Brazil	5
7 May 2000
Chile	40
Paraguay	10

Semi-finals
7 May 2000
Canada	26
United States	19
7 May 2000
Uruguay	12
Chile	17

Finals/Both Qualify
7 May 2000
Canada	29
Chile	12
Third Place/Qualifier
7 May 2000
United States	21
Uruguay	17

== Asia ==
A two-day tournament was held in Kuala Lumpur to determine the three teams to join South Korea at the World Cup Sevens.

=== Day One ===
Pool A

Teams	Pld	W	D	L	PF	PA	+/–	Pts
Japan	4	4	0	0	183	43	+140	12
Malaysia	4	2	0	2	130	85	+45	8
China	4	2	0	2	116	74	+42	8
Singapore	4	2	0	2	88	101	–13	8
India	4	0	0	4	12	226	–214	4

Matches

17 March 2000

China	47–5	India

Petaling Jaya Stadium, Kuala Lumpur

17 March 2000

Japan	42–19	Singapore

Petaling Jaya Stadium, Kuala Lumpur

17 March 2000

Japan	29–12	China

Petaling Jaya Stadium, Kuala Lumpur

17 March 2000

Malaysia	12–26	Singapore

Petaling Jaya Stadium, Kuala Lumpur

17 March 2000

China	40–7	Singapore

Petaling Jaya Stadium, Kuala Lumpur

17 March 2000

Japan	42–12	Malaysia

Petaling Jaya Stadium, Kuala Lumpur

17 March 2000

Japan	70–0	India

Petaling Jaya Stadium, Kuala Lumpur

17 March 2000

Malaysia	33–17	China

Petaling Jaya Stadium, Kuala Lumpur

17 March 2000

Singapore	36–7	India

Petaling Jaya Stadium, Kuala Lumpur

17 March 2000

Malaysia	73–0	India

Petaling Jaya Stadium, Kuala Lumpur

Pool B

Teams	Pld	W	D	L	PF	PA	+/–	Pts
Hong Kong	4	4	0	0	91	33	+58	12
Chinese Taipei	4	2	0	2	69	53	+16	8
Thailand	4	2	0	2	78	69	+9	8
Sri Lanka	4	1	0	3	62	93	–31	6
(Cooperation Council for the Arab States of the Gulf) Arabian Gulf	4	1	0	3	46	98	–52	6

Matches

17 March 2000

Sri Lanka	19–17	(Cooperation Council for the Arab States of the Gulf) Arabian Gulf

Petaling Jaya Stadium, Kuala Lumpur

17 March 2000

Hong Kong	14–7	Thailand

Petaling Jaya Stadium, Kuala Lumpur

17 March 2000

Hong Kong	26–12	Sri Lanka

Petaling Jaya Stadium, Kuala Lumpur

17 March 2000

Chinese Taipei	24–5	Thailand

Petaling Jaya Stadium, Kuala Lumpur

17 March 2000

Sri Lanka	26–33	Thailand

Petaling Jaya Stadium, Kuala Lumpur

17 March 2000

Chinese Taipei	14–24	(Cooperation Council for the Arab States of the Gulf) Arabian Gulf

Petaling Jaya Stadium, Kuala Lumpur

17 March 2000

Hong Kong	32–0	(Cooperation Council for the Arab States of the Gulf) Arabian Gulf

Petaling Jaya Stadium, Kuala Lumpur

17 March 2000

Chinese Taipei	17–5	Sri Lanka

Petaling Jaya Stadium, Kuala Lumpur

17 March 2000

Thailand	33–5	(Cooperation Council for the Arab States of the Gulf) Arabian Gulf

Petaling Jaya Stadium, Kuala Lumpur

17 March 2000

Hong Kong	19–14	Chinese Taipei

Petaling Jaya Stadium, Kuala Lumpur

=== Day Two ===
Pool C

Teams	Pld	W	D	L	PF	PA	+/–	Pts
Japan	4	4	0	0	192	45	+147	12
Chinese Taipei	4	3	0	1	148	57	+91	10
Sri Lanka	4	2	0	2	59	106	–47	8
China	4	1	0	3	54	96	–42	6
India	4	0	0	4	21	170	–149	4

Matches

18 March 2000

Sri Lanka	35–14	India

Petaling Jaya Stadium, Kuala Lumpur

18 March 2000

Japan	43–0	China

Petaling Jaya Stadium, Kuala Lumpur

18 March 2000

Japan	47–0	Sri Lanka

Petaling Jaya Stadium, Kuala Lumpur

18 March 2000

Chinese Taipei	22–0	China

Petaling Jaya Stadium, Kuala Lumpur

18 March 2000

China	21–24	Sri Lanka

Petaling Jaya Stadium, Kuala Lumpur

18 March 2000

Chinese Taipei	57–0	India

Petaling Jaya Stadium, Kuala Lumpur

18 March 2000

Japan	45–0	India

Petaling Jaya Stadium, Kuala Lumpur

18 March 2000

Chinese Taipei	24–0	Sri Lanka

Petaling Jaya Stadium, Kuala Lumpur

18 March 2000

China	33–7	India

Petaling Jaya Stadium, Kuala Lumpur

18 March 2000

Japan	57–45	Chinese Taipei

Petaling Jaya Stadium, Kuala Lumpur

Pool D

Teams	Pld	W	D	L	PF	PA	+/–	Pts
Hong Kong	4	4	0	0	143	47	+96	12
Malaysia	4	3	0	1	81	63	+18	10
(Cooperation Council for the Arab States of the Gulf) Arabian Gulf	4	1	0	3	76	90	–14	6
Thailand	4	1	0	3	44	81	–37	6
Singapore	4	1	0	3	38	101	–63	6

Matches

18 March 2000

Singapore	14–28	(Cooperation Council for the Arab States of the Gulf) Arabian Gulf

Petaling Jaya Stadium, Kuala Lumpur

18 March 2000

Hong Kong	31–5	Thailand

Petaling Jaya Stadium, Kuala Lumpur

18 March 2000

Hong Kong	43–0	Singapore

Petaling Jaya Stadium, Kuala Lumpur

18 March 2000

Malaysia	26–15	Thailand

Petaling Jaya Stadium, Kuala Lumpur

18 March 2000

Thailand	12–14	Singapore

Petaling Jaya Stadium, Kuala Lumpur

18 March 2000

Malaysia	19–14	(Cooperation Council for the Arab States of the Gulf) Arabian Gulf

Petaling Jaya Stadium, Kuala Lumpur

18 March 2000

Hong Kong	24–18	Malaysia

Petaling Jaya Stadium, Kuala Lumpur

18 March 2000

Thailand	12–10	(Cooperation Council for the Arab States of the Gulf) Arabian Gulf

Petaling Jaya Stadium, Kuala Lumpur

18 March 2000

Malaysia	18–10	Singapore

Petaling Jaya Stadium, Kuala Lumpur

18 March 2000

Hong Kong	45–24	(Cooperation Council for the Arab States of the Gulf) Arabian Gulf

Petaling Jaya Stadium, Kuala Lumpur

Placement Round

Third Place/Qualification
18 March 2000
Chinese Taipei	45
Malaysia	0

Final
18 March 2000
Japan	49
Hong Kong	12

== Europe ==
There were two separate tournaments in Europe, both qualifying three nations among sixteen. The first took place in Heidelberg on 10–11 June. The second in Madrid took place between 30 June and 1 July.

=== Qualifier 1 (Heidelberg) ===
==== Day 1 ====
Pool A

Teams	Pld	W	D	L	PF	PA	+/–	Pts
Wales	3	3	0	0	131	7	+124	9
Czech Republic	3	2	0	1	48	39	+9	7
Moldova	3	1	0	2	34	55	–21	5
Poland	3	0	0	3	0	112	–112	3

Matches

10 June 2000

Wales	38–7	Moldova

10 June 2000

Czech Republic	31–0	Poland

10 June 2000

Wales	54–0	Poland

10 June 2000

Czech Republic	17–0	Moldova

10 June 2000

Wales	39–0	Czech Republic

10 June 2000

Moldova	27–0	Poland

Pool B

Teams	Pld	W	D	L	PF	PA	+/–	Pts
Romania	3	3	0	0	106	7	+99	9
Denmark	3	2	0	1	68	54	+14	7
Luxembourg	3	1	0	2	49	64	–15	5
Belgium	3	0	0	3	17	115	–98	3

Matches

10 June 2000

Belgium	5–35	Luxembourg

10 June 2000

Romania	28–7	Denmark

10 June 2000

Luxembourg	14–19	Denmark

10 June 2000

Romania	38–0	Belgium

10 June 2000

Romania	40–0	Luxembourg

10 June 2000

Belgium	12–42	Denmark

Pool C

Teams	Pld	W	D	L	PF	PA	+/–	Pts
Ireland	3	3	0	0	99	26	+73	9
Germany	3	2	0	1	69	45	+24	7
Switzerland	3	1	0	2	55	53	+2	5
Austria	3	0	0	3	5	104	–99	3

Matches

10 June 2000

Germany	33–0	Austria

10 June 2000

Ireland	24–14	Switzerland

10 June 2000

Germany	24–10	Switzerland

10 June 2000

Ireland	40–0	Austria

10 June 2000

Ireland	35–12	Germany

10 June 2000

Switzerland	35–12	Austria

Pool D

Teams	Pld	W	D	L	PF	PA	+/–	Pts
Georgia	3	3	0	0	136	0	+136	9
Netherlands	3	2	0	1	47	46	+1	5
Serbia and Montenegro	3	1	0	2	22	71	–49	5
Hungary	3	0	0	3	7	95	–88	3

Matches

10 June 2000

Georgia	29–0	Netherlands

10 June 2000

Serbia and Montenegro	12–0	Hungary

10 June 2000

Georgia	50–0	Hungary

10 June 2000

Netherlands	14–10	Serbia and Montenegro

10 June 2000

Georgia	57–0	Serbia and Montenegro

10 June 2000

Netherlands	33–7	Hungary

==== Day 2 ====
Pool A

Teams	Pld	W	D	L	PF	PA	+/–	Pts
Georgia	3	3	0	0	124	12	+112	9
Netherlands	3	2	0	1	52	52	+0	7
Switzerland	3	1	0	2	19	53	–34	5
Poland	3	0	0	3	12	90	–78	3

Matches

11 June 2000

Georgia	27–0	Switzerland

11 June 2000

Netherlands	19–7	Poland

11 June 2000

Georgia	45–7	Netherlands

11 June 2000

Switzerland	19–0	Poland

11 June 2000

Georgia	52–5	Poland

11 June 2000

Netherlands	26–0	Switzerland

Pool B

Teams	Pld	W	D	L	PF	PA	+/–	Pts
Wales	3	3	0	0	130	12	+118	9
Luxembourg	3	2	0	1	56	64	–8	7
Czech Republic	3	1	0	2	50	66	–16	5
Austria	3	0	0	3	17	111	–94	3

Matches

11 June 2000

Wales	47–0	Luxembourg

11 June 2000

Czech Republic	31–7	Austria

11 June 2000

Wales	38–7	Czech Republic

11 June 2000

Luxembourg	35–5	Austria

11 June 2000

Wales	45–5	Austria

11 June 2000

Czech Republic	12–21	Luxembourg

Pool C

Teams	Pld	W	D	L	PF	PA	+/–	Pts
Denmark	3	3	0	0	64	19	+45	7
Romania	3	2	0	1	50	38	+12	7
Moldova	3	1	0	2	50	46	+4	7
Hungary	3	0	0	3	19	80	–61	3

Matches

11 June 2000

Romania	29–12	Moldova

11 June 2000

Denmark	40–0	Hungary

11 June 2000

Romania	0–19	Denmark

11 June 2000

Moldova	19–12	Hungary

11 June 2000

Romania	21–7	Hungary

11 June 2000

Denmark	5–19	Moldova

Pool D

Teams	Pld	W	D	L	PF	PA	+/–	Pts
Ireland	3	3	0	0	106	22	+84	9
Germany	3	2	0	1	90	48	+42	7
Belgium	3	1	0	2	33	99	–66	5
Serbia and Montenegro	3	0	0	3	32	92	–60	3

Matches

11 June 2000

Ireland	28–10	Serbia and Montenegro

11 June 2000

Germany	40–7	Belgium

11 June 2000

Ireland	31–7	Germany

11 June 2000

Serbia and Montenegro	12–21	Belgium

11 June 2000

Ireland	47–5	Belgium

11 June 2000

Germany	43–10	Serbia and Montenegro

Semi-finals
11 June 2000
Georgia	21
Ireland	0
11 June 2000
Wales	43
Denmark	0

Final
11 June 2000
Georgia	33
Wales	38
Third/Qualifier
11 June 2000
Ireland	40
Denmark	5

=== Qualifier 2 (Madrid) ===
==== Day 1 ====
Pool A

Teams	Pld	W	D	L	PF	PA	+/–	Pts
Scotland	3	3	0	0	162	14	+148	9
Latvia	3	2	0	1	55	66	–11	7
Israel	3	1	0	2	38	66	–28	5
Norway	3	0	0	3	12	121	–109	3

Matches

30 June 2000

Scotland	73–0	Norway

30 June 2000

Latvia	19–12	Israel

30 June 2000

Scotland	40–7	Israel

30 June 2000

Latvia	29–5	Norway

30 June 2000

Scotland	49–7	Latvia

30 June 2000

Israel	19–7	Norway

Pool B

Teams	Pld	W	D	L	PF	PA	+/–	Pts
Spain	3	3	0	0	158	0	+158	9
Ukraine	3	2	0	1	68	47	+21	7
Sweden	3	1	0	2	54	74	–20	5
Monaco	3	0	0	3	0	159	–159	3

Matches

30 June 2000

Spain	68–0	Monaco

30 June 2000

Ukraine	17–14	Sweden

30 June 2000

Spain	57–0	Sweden

30 June 2000

Ukraine	51–0	Monaco

30 June 2000

Spain	33–0	Ukraine

30 June 2000

Sweden	40–0	Monaco

Pool C

Teams	Pld	W	D	L	PF	PA	+/–	Pts
Portugal	3	3	0	0	111	17	+94	9
Croatia	3	2	0	1	87	43	+44	7
Lithuania	3	1	0	2	32	66	–34	5
Slovenia	3	0	0	3	7	111	–104	3

Matches

30 June 2000

Portugal	35–0	Slovenia

30 June 2000

Croatia	19–7	Lithuania

30 June 2000

Portugal	40–5	Lithuania

30 June 2000

Croatia	56–0	Slovenia

30 June 2000

Portugal	36–12	Croatia

30 June 2000

Lithuania	20–7	Slovenia

Pool D

Teams	Pld	W	D	L	PF	PA	+/–	Pts
Russia	3	3	0	0	116	19	+97	9
Italy	3	2	0	1	119	38	+81	7
Bulgaria	3	1	0	2	36	113	–77	5
Andorra	3	0	0	3	38	139	–101	3

Matches

30 June 2000

Italy	43–7	Andorra

30 June 2000

Russia	25–0	Bulgaria

30 June 2000

Italy	64–0	Bulgaria

30 June 2000

Russia	60–7	Andorra

30 June 2000

Russia	31–12	Italy

30 June 2000

Bulgaria	36–24	Andorra

==== Day 2 ====
Pool A

Teams	Pld	W	D	L	PF	PA	+/–	Pts
Spain	3	3	0	0	109	5	+104	9
Sweden	3	2	0	1	52	67	–15	7
Latvia	3	1	0	2	43	71	–28	5
Monaco	3	0	0	1	34	95	–61	3

Matches

1 July 2000

Spain	45–0	Monaco

1 July 2000

Latvia	19–21	Sweden

1 July 2000

Spain	31–5	Sweden

1 July 2000

Latvia	24–17	Monaco

1 July 2000

Spain	33–0	Latvia

1 July 2000

Sweden	26–17	Monaco

Pool B

Teams	Pld	W	D	L	PF	PA	+/–	Pts
Scotland	3	3	0	0	111	12	+99	9
Ukraine	3	2	0	1	78	50	+28	7
Slovenia	3	1	0	2	26	96	–70	5
Israel	3	0	0	3	35	92	–57	3

Matches

1 July 2000

Scotland	40–0	Slovenia

1 July 2000

Ukraine	31–14	Israel

1 July 2000

Scotland	40–7	Israel

1 July 2000

Ukraine	42–5	Slovenia

1 July 2000

Scotland	31–5	Ukraine

1 July 2000

Israel	14–21	Slovenia

Pool C

Teams	Pld	W	D	L	PF	PA	+/–	Pts
Russia	3	3	0	0	88	14	+74	9
Croatia	3	2	0	1	73	12	+61	7
Lithuania	3	1	0	2	54	45	–70	5
Norway	3	0	0	3	0	144	–144	3

Matches

1 July 2000

Russia	57–0	Norway

1 July 2000

Croatia	26–0	Lithuania

1 July 2000

Russia	19–14	Lithuania

1 July 2000

Croatia	47–0	Norway

1 July 2000

Russia	12–0	Croatia

1 July 2000

Lithuania	40–0	Norway

Pool D

Teams	Pld	W	D	L	PF	PA	+/–	Pts
Portugal	3	3	0	0	135	14	+121	9
Italy	3	2	0	1	105	29	+76	7
Bulgaria	3	0	1	2	24	111	–87	4
Andorra	3	0	1	2	19	129	–110	4

Matches

1 July 2000

Portugal	61–0	Andorra

1 July 2000

Italy	42–5	Bulgaria

1 July 2000

Portugal	50–0	Bulgaria

1 July 2000

Italy	49–0	Andorra

1 July 2000

Portugal	24–14	Italy

1 July 2000

Bulgaria	19–19	Andorra

Semi-finals
1 July 2000
Spain	5
Portugal	7
1 July 2000
Scotland	14
Russia	31

Final
1 July 2000
Portugal	24
Russia	19
Third/Qualifier
1 July 2000
Spain	36
Scotland	19

== Oceania ==
The Oceania qualifying tournament took place in Rarotonga. After a six-team round robin, the two leading teams faced off for the championship, from which the host won and qualified for the World Cup.

Teams	Pld	W	D	L	PF	PA	+/–	Pts
Tonga	5	4	1	0	134	22	+112	14
Cook Islands	5	4	0	1	131	43	+88	13
Papua New Guinea	5	3	1	1	92	70	+22	12
Niue	5	2	0	3	73	82	–9	9
Vanuatu	5	1	0	4	63	99	–36	7
Tahiti	5	0	0	5	17	194	–177	5

Matches

21 September 2000

Niue	14–12	Vanuatu

Avarua Tereora Stadium, Rarotonga

21 September 2000

Papua New Guinea	40–0	Tahiti

Avarua Tereora Stadium, Rarotonga

21 September 2000

Tonga	21–0	Niue

Avarua Tereora Stadium, Rarotonga

21 September 2000

Cook Islands	47–5	Tahiti

Avarua Tereora Stadium, Rarotonga

21 September 2000

Tonga	32–5	Vanuatu

Avarua Tereora Stadium, Rarotonga

21 September 2000

Cook Islands	29–0	Papua New Guinea

Avarua Tereora Stadium, Rarotonga

21 September 2000

Niue	33–7	Tahiti

Avarua Tereora Stadium, Rarotonga

21 September 2000

Tonga	12–12	Papua New Guinea

Avarua Tereora Stadium, Rarotonga

21 September 2000

Cook Islands	34–7	Vanuatu

Avarua Tereora Stadium, Rarotonga

22 September 2000

Tonga	45–5	Tahiti

Avarua Tereora Stadium, Rarotonga

22 September 2000

Papua New Guinea	21–19	Niue

Avarua Tereora Stadium, Rarotonga

22 September 2000

Vanuatu	29–0	Tahiti

Avarua Tereora Stadium, Rarotonga

22 September 2000

Cook Islands	21–7	Niue

Avarua Tereora Stadium, Rarotonga

22 September 2000

Papua New Guinea	19–10	Vanuatu

Avarua Tereora Stadium, Rarotonga

22 September 2000

Tonga	24–0	Cook Islands

Avarua Tereora Stadium, Rarotonga

Final
22 September 2000
Tonga	21
Cook Islands	24
