= 2022 Rugby Europe Sevens Conference =

The 2022 Rugby Europe Sevens Conference's are the third and fourth divisions of Rugby Europe's 2022 sevens season. Conference 1 was held in Belgrade, Serbia on 4–5 June 2022, while Conference 2 was held in Paola, Malta on 11–12 June 2022.

== Participating nations ==
Conference 1

- Andorra
- Austria
- Bosnia and Herzegovina
- Cyprus
- Finland
- Monaco
- Moldova
- Montenegro
- Norway
- Serbia
- Switzerland
- Turkey

Conference 2

- Estonia
- Kosovo
- Malta
- San Marino
- Slovakia
- Slovenia

== Conference 1 ==
2022 Rugby Europe Sevens Conference
- Hosts: Serbia
- Date: 4–5 June
- Nations: 12

Final positions
- Champions: Switzerland
- Runners-up: Moldova
- Third: Turkey

Series details
- Matches played: 34

=== Group stage ===
All times in Central European Summer Time (UTC+02:00)

==== Pool A ====
Team	Pld	W	D	L	PD	Pts
Turkey	3	3	0	0	+86	9
Serbia	3	1	0	2	-17	5
Cyprus	3	1	0	2	-28	5
Montenegro	3	1	0	2	-41	5

4 June 2022
10:00

Turkey	34–0; Report	Cyprus

King Peter 1 Stadium, Belgrade, Serbia

4 June 2022
10:22

Serbia	14–15; Report	Montenegro

King Peter 1 Stadium, Belgrade, Serbia

4 June 2022
13:00

Turkey	39–12; Report	Montenegro

King Peter 1 Stadium, Belgrade, Serbia

4 June 2022
13:22

Serbia	22–12; Report	Cyprus

King Peter 1 Stadium, Belgrade, Serbia

4 June 2022
16:00

Turkey	26–0; Report	Serbia

King Peter 1 Stadium, Belgrade, Serbia

4 June 2022
16:22

Montenegro	5–21; Report	Cyprus

King Peter 1 Stadium, Belgrade, Serbia

==== Pool B ====
Team	Pld	W	D	L	PD	Pts
Monaco	3	2	1	0	+64	8
Andorra	3	2	0	1	+9	7
Norway	3	1	1	1	+3	6
Bosnia and Herzegovina	3	0	0	3	-76	3

4 June 2022
10:44

Monaco	19–19; Report	Norway

King Peter 1 Stadium, Belgrade, Serbia

4 June 2022
11:06

Andorra	21–12; Report	Bosnia and Herzegovina

King Peter 1 Stadium, Belgrade, Serbia

4 June 2022
13:44

Monaco	45–0; Report	Bosnia and Herzegovina

King Peter 1 Stadium, Belgrade, Serbia

4 June 2022
14:06

Andorra	33–14; Report	Norway

King Peter 1 Stadium, Belgrade, Serbia

4 June 2022
16:44

Monaco	38–19; Report	Andorra

King Peter 1 Stadium, Belgrade, Serbia

4 June 2022
17:06

Bosnia and Herzegovina	12–34; Report	Norway

King Peter 1 Stadium, Belgrade, Serbia

==== Pool C ====
Team	Pld	W	D	L	PD	Pts
Switzerland	3	2	0	1	+50	7
Austria	3	2	0	1	-3	7
Moldova	3	2	0	1	+8	7
Finland	3	0	0	3	-55	3

4 June 2022
11:28

Moldova	22–7; Report	Finland

King Peter 1 Stadium, Belgrade, Serbia

4 June 2022
11:50

Austria	15–33; Report	Switzerland

King Peter 1 Stadium, Belgrade, Serbia

4 June 2022
14:28

Moldova	19–17; Report	Switzerland

King Peter 1 Stadium, Belgrade, Serbia

4 June 2022
14:50

Austria	26–20; Report	Finland

King Peter 1 Stadium, Belgrade, Serbia

4 June 2022
17:28

Moldova	17–26; Report	Austria

King Peter 1 Stadium, Belgrade, Serbia

4 June 2022
17:50

Switzerland	41–7; Report	Finland

King Peter 1 Stadium, Belgrade, Serbia

=== Knockout stage ===
==== Cup ====
Quarter-finals
5 June 2022 – 10:00 Report
Turkey	24
Norway	19
5 June 2022 – 11:06 Report
Andorra	19
Moldova	21
5 June 2022 – 10:22 Report
Monaco	19
Austria	17
5 June 2022 – 10:44 Report
Switzerland	43
Serbia	7

Semi-finals
5 June 2022 – 15:12 Report
Turkey	5
Moldova	29
5 June 2022 – 15:34 Report
Monaco	14
Switzerland	15

Final
5 June 2022 – 18:55 Report
Moldova	0
Switzerland	12
Third place
5 June 2022 – 18:30 Report
Turkey	22
Monaco	12

==== 5–8th Place ====
Semi-finals
5 June 2022 – 14:28 Report
Norway	19
Andorra	0
5 June 2022 – 14:50 Report
Austria	39
Serbia	7

Fifth place
5 June 2022 – 17:12 Report
Norway	0
Austria	22
Seventh place
5 June 2022 – 16:50 Report
Andorra	42
Serbia	24

==== 9–12th Place ====
Semi-finals
5 June 2022 – 11:00 Report
Cyprus	29
Bosnia and Herzegovina	5
5 June 2022 – 11:20 Report
Montenegro	10
Finland	33

Ninth place
5 June 2022 – 13:52 Report
Cyprus	29
Finland	19
Eleventh place
5 June 2022 – 13:30 Report
Bosnia and Herzegovina	24
Montenegro	5

=== Standings ===
Legend
Promoted to 2023 Trophy
Relegated to 2023 Conference 2

Rank	Team
1st place, gold medalist(s)	Switzerland
2nd place, silver medalist(s)	Moldova
3rd place, bronze medalist(s)	Turkey
4	Monaco
5	Austria
6	Norway
7	Andorra
8	Serbia
9	Cyprus
10	Finland
11	Bosnia and Herzegovina
12	Montenegro

== Conference 2 ==
2022 Rugby Europe Sevens Conference
- Hosts: Malta
- Date: 11–12 June
- Nations: 6

Final positions
- Champions: Malta
- Runners-up: San Marino
- Third: Slovakia

Series details
- Matches played: 15

=== Group stage ===
All times in Central European Summer Time (UTC+02:00)

Legend
Promoted to 2023 Conference 1

Team	Pld	W	D	L	PD	Pts
Malta	5	5	0	0	+142	15
San Marino	5	4	0	1	+47	13
Slovakia	5	3	0	2	-6	11
Slovenia	5	2	0	3	+16	9
Kosovo	5	1	0	4	-67	7
Estonia	5	0	0	5	-132	5

11 June 2022
10:00

Slovenia	22–5; Report	Kosovo

Hibernians Stadium, Paola, Malta

11 June 2022
10:22

San Marino	5–19; Report	Malta

Hibernians Stadium, Paola, Malta

11 June 2022
10:44

Slovakia	31–12; Report	Estonia

Hibernians Stadium, Paola, Malta

11 June 2022
16:00

Malta	21–12; Report	Slovenia

Hibernians Stadium, Paola, Malta

11 June 2022
16:22

Estonia	12–15; Report	San Marino

Hibernians Stadium, Paola, Malta

11 June 2022
16:44

Slovakia	22–12; Report	Kosovo

Hibernians Stadium, Paola, Malta

11 June 2022
18:30

Slovenia	34–5; Report	Estonia

Hibernians Stadium, Paola, Malta

11 June 2022
18:52

San Marino	14–0; Report	Slovakia

Hibernians Stadium, Paola, Malta

11 June 2022
19:14

Kosovo	0–48; Report	Malta

Hibernians Stadium, Paola, Malta

12 June 2022
14:00

Slovakia	12–5; Report	Slovenia

Hibernians Stadium, Paola, Malta

12 June 2022
14:22

Estonia	7–50; Report	Malta

Hibernians Stadium, Paola, Malta

12 June 2022
14:44

San Marino	30–0; Report	Kosovo

Hibernians Stadium, Paola, Malta

12 June 2022
16:30

Slovenia	7–21; Report	San Marino

Hibernians Stadium, Paola, Malta

12 June 2022
16:52

Malta	35–7; Report	Slovakia

Hibernians Stadium, Paola, Malta

12 June 2022
17:14

Kosovo	38–0; Report	Estonia

Hibernians Stadium, Paola, Malta
