= 2018 Rugby Europe Sevens Conferences =

- Hosts: Conference 1: Bosnia and Herzegovina; Conference 2: Estonia
- Date: 23 June - 15 July

The 2018 Rugby Europe Sevens Conferences are the lower divisions of Rugby Europe's 2018 sevens season. Conference 1 is held in Zenica, Bosnia and Herzegovina, with the two top-placing teams advancing to the 2019 Trophy, while Conference 2 is held in Tallinn, Estonia, with the top two advancing to Conference 1 for 2019.

== Conference 1 ==
Will be held in Zenica, Bosnia and Herzegovina on 23–24 June.

Legend
Promoted to 2019 Trophy

| Rank | Team |
|---|---|
| 1st place, gold medalist(s) | Czech Republic |
| 2nd place, silver medalist(s) | Bosnia and Herzegovina |
| 3rd place, bronze medalist(s) | Moldova |
| 4 | Serbia |
| 5 | Turkey |
| 6 | Slovenia |
| 7 | Monaco |
| 8 | Austria |
| 9 | Slovakia |
| 10 | Finland |
| 11 | Norway |
| 12 | Montenegro |

=== Pool Stage ===
==== Pool A ====
| Team | Pld | W | D | L | PF | PA | PD | Pts |
|---|---|---|---|---|---|---|---|---|
| Bosnia and Herzegovina | 3 | 2 | 0 | 1 | 62 | 47 | +15 | 7 |
| Moldova | 3 | 2 | 0 | 1 | 61 | 46 | +15 | 7 |
| Turkey | 3 | 2 | 0 | 1 | 71 | 57 | +14 | 7 |
| Montenegro | 3 | 0 | 0 | 3 | 31 | 75 | –44 | 3 |

| 23 June 2018 | Moldova | 14–5 | Montenegro |
| 11:28 |

| 23 June 2018 | Bosnia and Herzegovina | 24–7 | Turkey |
| 11:50 |

| 23 June 2018 | Moldova | 21–31 | Turkey |
| 14:13 |

| 23 June 2018 | Bosnia and Herzegovina | 28–14 | Montenegro |
| 14:35 |

| 23 June 2018 | Turkey | 33–12 | Montenegro |
| 16:58 |

| 23 June 2018 | Moldova | 26–10 | Bosnia and Herzegovina |
| 17:20 |

==== Pool B ====
| Team | Pld | W | D | L | PF | PA | PD | Pts |
|---|---|---|---|---|---|---|---|---|
| Czech Republic | 3 | 3 | 0 | 0 | 84 | 24 | +60 | 9 |
| Monaco | 3 | 2 | 0 | 1 | 44 | 64 | –20 | 7 |
| Finland | 3 | 1 | 0 | 2 | 53 | 37 | +16 | 5 |
| Norway | 3 | 0 | 0 | 3 | 31 | 87 | –56 | 3 |

| 23 June 2018 | Czech Republic | 17–12 | Finland |
| 10:44 |

| 23 June 2018 | Norway | 19–24 | Monaco |
| 11:06 |

| 23 June 2018 | Czech Republic | 35–5 | Monaco |
| 13:29 |

| 23 June 2018 | Norway | 5–31 | Finland |
| 13:51 |

| 23 June 2018 | Czech Republic | 32–7 | Norway |
| 16:36 |

| 23 June 2018 | Monaco | 15–10 | Finland |
| 16:36 |

==== Pool C ====
| Team | Pld | W | D | L | PF | PA | PD | Pts |
|---|---|---|---|---|---|---|---|---|
| Austria | 3 | 2 | 0 | 1 | 71 | 39 | +32 | 7 |
| Serbia | 3 | 2 | 0 | 1 | 61 | 45 | +16 | 7 |
| Slovenia | 3 | 2 | 0 | 1 | 41 | 43 | –2 | 7 |
| Slovakia | 3 | 0 | 0 | 3 | 33 | 79 | –46 | 3 |

| 23 June 2018 | Slovakia | 7–38 | Austria |
| 10:00 |

| 23 June 2018 | Serbia | 17–12 | Slovenia |
| 10:22 |

| 23 June 2018 | Slovakia | 12–14 | Slovenia |
| 12:45 |

| 23 June 2018 | Serbia | 17–19 | Austria |
| 13:07 |

| 23 June 2018 | Slovakia | 14–27 | Serbia |
| 15:30 |

| 23 June 2018 | Slovenia | 15–14 | Austria |
| 15:52 |

=== Knockout stage ===
==== Challenge Trophy ====
Semi-finals
24 June 2018 – 11:28
Finland | 28
Norway | 12
24 June 2018 – 11:50
Montenegro | 17
Slovakia | 19

Final
24 June 2018 – 15:05
Finland | 5
Slovakia | 26
Eleventh Place
24 June 2018 – 14:43
Norway | 40
Montenegro | 12

==== 5th Place ====
Semi-finals
24 June 2018 – 13:15
Slovenia | 19
Monaco | 7
24 June 2018 – 13:37
Turkey | 29
Austria | 7

Final
24 June 2018 – 16:24
Slovenia | 14
Turkey | 36
Seventh Place
24 June 2018 – 16:02
Monaco | 41
Austria | 12

==== Cup ====
Quarter-finals
24 June 2018 – 10:00
Bosnia and Herzegovina | 24
Slovenia | 5
24 June 2018 – 11:06
Monaco | 21
Serbia | 31
24 June 2018 – 10:22
Czech Republic | 17
Turkey | 7
24 June 2018 – 10:44
Austria | 19
Moldova | 24

Semi-finals
24 June 2018 – 13:59
Bosnia and Herzegovina | 19
Serbia | 10
24 June 2018 – 14:21
Czech Republic | 24
Moldova | 5

Final
24 June 2018 – 17:12
Bosnia and Herzegovina | 0
Czech Republic | 43
Third place
24 June 2018 – 16:52
Serbia | 14
Moldova | 22

== Conference 2 ==
Will be played in Tartu, Estonia on 14–15 July.

Legend
Promoted to 2019 Conference
Invited Team

| # | Team | Pld | W | D | L | PF | PA | PD | Pts |
|---|---|---|---|---|---|---|---|---|---|
| | Saint Petersburg | 6 | 6 | 0 | 0 | 140 | 58 | +82 | 18 |
| 1 | Switzerland | 6 | 5 | 0 | 1 | 149 | 22 | +127 | 16 |
| 2 | Andorra | 6 | 4 | 0 | 2 | 88 | 82 | +6 | 14 |
| 3 | Liechtenstein | 6 | 3 | 0 | 3 | 91 | 112 | –21 | 12 |
| 4 | Iceland | 6 | 2 | 0 | 4 | 68 | 138 | –70 | 10 |
| 5 | Belarus | 6 | 1 | 0 | 5 | 74 | 130 | –56 | 8 |
| 6 | Estonia | 6 | 0 | 0 | 6 | 63 | 131 | –68 | 6 |

Matches

| 14 July 2018 | Switzerland | 31–5 | Liechtenstein |
| 10:00 |

| 14 July 2018 | Andorra | 14–5 | Belarus |
| 10:22 |

| 14 July 2018 | Estonia | 5–20 | Iceland |
| 10:44 |

| 14 July 2018 | Saint Petersburg | 12–5 | Switzerland |
| 12:22 |

| 14 July 2018 | Belarus | 12–26 | Liechtenstein |
| 12:44 |

| 14 July 2018 | Andorra | 19–15 | Estonia |
| 13:06 |

| 14 July 2018 | Iceland | 7–40 | Saint Petersburg |
| 14:45 |

| 14 July 2018 | Belarus | 0–36 | Switzerland |
| 15:07 |

| 14 July 2018 | Liechtenstein | 15–7 | Estonia |
| 15:29 |

| 15 July 2018 | Iceland | 10–19 | Andorra |
| 16:15 |

| 15 July 2018 | Belarus | 5–12 | Saint Petersburg |
| 8:22 |

| 15 July 2018 | Estonia | 0–15 | Switzerland |
| 8:44 |

| 15 July 2018 | Liechtenstein | 24–10 | Iceland |
| 10:22 |

| 15 July 2018 | Saint Petersburg | 14–12 | Andorra |
| 10:44 |

| 15 July 2018 | Estonia | 21–33 | Belarus |
| 11:06 |

| 15 July 2018 | Switzerland | 31–0 | Iceland |
| 12:45 |

| 15 July 2018 | Andorra | 19–7 | Liechtenstein |
| 13:07 |

| 15 July 2018 | Saint Petersburg | 29–15 | Estonia |
| 13:29 |

| 15 July 2018 | Iceland | 21–19 | Belarus |
| 15:07 |

| 15 July 2018 | Liechtenstein | 14–33 | Saint Petersburg |
| 15:29 |

| 15 July 2018 | Switzerland | 31–5 | Andorra |
| 15:51 |
