= 2021 Rugby Europe Under-18 Sevens Trophy =

- Countries: Latvia
- Number of teams: 12
- Champions: Ukraine
- Runners-up: Israel
- Matches played: 34

The 2021 Rugby Europe Under-18 Sevens Trophy was held in Riga, Latvia between 24 and 25 July. Ukraine won the Championship and Israel were runners-up.

== Teams ==
- Luxembourg
- Croatia
- Andorra
- Hungary
- Ukraine
- Israel
- Austria
- Bulgaria
- Latvia
- Sweden
- Turkey
- Moldova

== Pool stages ==
Legend
	Qualified for the Cup Quarterfinals
	Qualified for 9th-place semifinals

=== Pool A ===
Team	P	W	D	L	PF	PA	PD	Pts
Luxembourg	3	3	0	0	76	43	33	9
Croatia	3	2	0	1	85	41	44	7
Andorra	3	1	0	2	68	64	4	5
Hungary	3	0	0	3	27	108	-81	3

July 24
10:00 AM (Local)

Luxembourg	26 - 14	Andorra
	Report

Referee: (Republic of Ireland) Peter MARTIN

July 24
10:22 AM (Local)

Croatia	40 - 5	Hungary
	Report

Referee: (Belgium) Nathan GEERINK

July 24
13:30 PM (Local)

Luxembourg	28 - 22	Hungary
	Report

Referee: (Ukraine) Vladislav ILNITSKYI

July 24
13:52 PM (Local)

Croatia	38 - 14	Andorra
	Report

Referee: (Georgia (country)) Sulkhan CHIKLADZE

July 25
16:00 PM (Local)

Luxembourg	22 - 7	Croatia
	Report

Referee: (Spain) Eki FANLO

July 25
16:22 PM (Local)

Hungary	0 - 40	Andorra
	Report

Referee: (Romania) Niculae FRATILA

=== Pool B ===
Team	P	W	D	L	PF	PA	PD	Pts
Latvia	3	3	0	0	86	5	81	9
Sweden	3	2	0	1	48	48	0	7
Turkey	3	1	0	2	51	39	12	5
Moldova	3	0	0	3	12	105	-93	3

July 24
10:44 AM (Local)

Latvia	43 - 0	Moldova
	Report

Referee: (Georgia (country)) Sulkhan CHIKLADZE

July 24
11:06 AM (Local)

Sweden	17 - 15	Turkey
	Report

Referee: (Netherlands) Edwin VANDERSPEK

July 24
14:14 PM (Local)

Latvia	22 - 5	Turkey
	Report

Referee: (Spain) Eki FANLO

July 24
14:36 PM (Local)

Sweden	31 - 12	Moldova
	Report

Referee: (Belgium) Nathan GEERINK

July 25
16:44 PM (Local)

Latvia	21 - 0	Sweden
	Report

Referee: (Republic of Ireland) Peter MARTIN

July 25
17:06 PM (Local)

Turkey	31 - 0	Moldova
	Report

Referee: (Ukraine) Vladislav ILNITSKYI

=== Pool C ===
Team	P	W	D	L	PF	PA	PD	Pts
Ukraine	3	3	0	0	135	12	123	9
Israel	3	2	0	1	109	17	92	7
Austria	3	1	0	2	57	86	-29	2
Bulgaria	3	0	0	3	5	191	-186	2

July 24
11:28 AM (Local)

Israel	31 - 0	Austria
	Report

Referee: (Romania) Niculae FRATILA

July 24
11:50 AM (Local)

Ukraine	68 - 0	Bulgaria
	Report

Referee: (Spain) Eki FANLO

July 24
14:58 PM (Local)

Israel	66 - 0	Bulgaria
	Report

Referee: (Republic of Ireland) Peter MARTIN

July 25
15:20 PM (Local)

Ukraine	50 - 0	Austria
	Report

Referee: (Netherlands) Edwin VANDERSPEK

July 25
17:28 PM (Local)

Israel	12 - 17	Ukraine
	Report

Referee: (Georgia (country)) Sulkhan CHIKLADZE

July 25
17:50 PM (Local)

Bulgaria	5 - 57	Austria
	Report

Referee: (Belgium) Nathan GEERINK

== Finals ==
Cup

Quarter-finals
Luxembourg	19
Andorra	7
Israel	24
Sweden	5
Latvia	22
Turkey	5
Ukraine	22
Croatia	5

Semi-finals
Israel	24
Luxembourg	14
Ukraine	22
Latvia	12

Cup Final
Ukraine	14
Israel	7
3rd Place
Latvia	12
Luxembourg	7

5th/7th Place Playoff

Semi-finals
Andorra	10
Sweden	5
Croatia	15
Turkey	12

5th-place final
Croatia	17
Andorra	12
7th Place
Turkey	21
Sweden	17

9th/11th Place Playoff

Semi-finals
Austria	64
Bulgaria	0
Hungary	20
Moldova	12

9th-place final
Hungary	24
Austria	19
11th Place
Moldova	62
Bulgaria	0

== Final standings ==
Rank	Team	Pts
1st place, gold medalist(s)	Ukraine	20
2nd place, silver medalist(s)	Israel	18
3rd place, bronze medalist(s)	Latvia	16
4	Luxembourg	14
5	Croatia	12
6	Andorra	10
7	Turkey	8
8	Sweden	6
9	Hungary	4
10	Austria	3
11	Moldova	2
12	Bulgaria	1
