= 2015 Rugby Europe Sevens – Lower Divisions =

- Host nation: Division C: Bosnia and Herzegovina; Division B: Croatia
- Date: 6–21 June

Division B
- Champion: Ireland
- Runner-up: Serbia

Division C
- Winner: Ireland
- Runner-up: Bosnia and Herzegovina

The lower divisions of the 2015 Rugby Europe Sevens were the first with a new classification, where prior years split Division B into two geographical zones. For the inaugural year of the format, Division C was held in Zenica, Bosnia and Herzegovina, with twelve teams contesting five spots for Division B. Division B then played a twelve-team tournament in Zagreb, Croatia, with the two top-placing teams advancing to the 2016 Trophy, and the champion advancing to the Rugby Europe repechage tournament for a chance to qualify for the Olympic qualification tournament.

== Division C ==
Ireland dominated the competition, winning all six matches, while scoring 47 tries and conceding only four. Their try scoring was led by Adam Byrne (8), followed by captain Tom Daly (7), and Alex Wootton (6).

=== Standings ===
Legend
Qualified for the Division B tournament.
Qualified for the Division B tournament, but declined invitation.
Invited to the Division B tournament in place of Turkey.

Rank	Team
1st place, gold medalist(s)	Ireland
2nd place, silver medalist(s)	Bosnia and Herzegovina
3rd place, bronze medalist(s)	Serbia
4	Turkey
5	Austria
6	Malta
7	Estonia
8	San Marino
9	Iceland
10	Belarus
11	Montenegro
12	Liechtenstein

=== Pool stage ===
Key to colours in group tables
Teams that advance to Quarterfinals

==== Pool A ====
Teams	Pld	W	D	L	PF	PA	+/−	Pts
Bosnia and Herzegovina	3	3	0	0	79	17	+62	9
Malta	3	1	1	1	47	41	+6	6
Austria	3	0	2	1	34	55	–21	5
Iceland	3	0	1	2	24	71	–47	4

6 June 2015
10:00

Bosnia and Herzegovina	26–12	Malta
	Report

Zenica

6 June 2015
11:06

Austria	19–19	Iceland
	Report

Zenica

6 June 2015
13:00

Bosnia and Herzegovina	27–0	Iceland
	Report

Zenica

6 June 2015
14:06

Austria	10–10	Malta
	Report

Zenica

6 June 2015
16:00

Iceland	5–25	Malta
	Report

Zenica

6 June 2015
17:06

Bosnia and Herzegovina	26 – 5	Austria
	Report

Zenica

==== Pool B ====
Teams	Pld	W	D	L	PF	PA	+/−	Pts
Ireland	3	3	0	0	162	10	+152	9
Turkey	3	2	0	1	50	60	–10	7
Montenegro	3	1	0	2	50	94	–44	5
Belarus	3	0	0	3	14	122	–98	3

6 June 2015
TBD

Turkey	5–43	Ireland
	Report

Zenica

6 June 2015
11:28

Belarus	14–28	Montenegro
	Report

Zenica

6 June 2015
13:22

Turkey	21–17	Montenegro
	Report

Zenica

6 June 2015
14:28

Belarus	0–60	Ireland
	Report

Zenica

6 June 2015
16:22

Montenegro	5–59	Ireland
	Report

Zenica

6 June 2015
17:28

Turkey	24–0	Belarus
	Report

Zenica

==== Pool C ====
Teams	Pld	W	D	L	PF	PA	+/−	Pts
Serbia	3	3	0	0	94	12	+82	9
Estonia	3	2	0	1	57	42	+15	7
San Marino	3	1	0	2	48	60	–12	5
Liechtenstein	3	0	0	3	24	109	–85	3

6 June 2015
10:44

Estonia	24–5	San Marino
	Report

Zenica

6 June 2015
11:50

Serbia	33–12	Liechtenstein
	Report

Zenica

6 June 2015
13:44

Estonia	33–12	Liechtenstein
	Report

Zenica

6 June 2015
14:50

Serbia	36–0	San Marino
	Report

Zenica

6 June 2015
16:44

Liechtenstein	0–43	San Marino
	Report

Zenica

6 June 2015
17:50

Estonia	0–25	Serbia
	Report

Zenica

=== Knockout stage ===
==== Bowl ====
Semi-finals
7 June 2015 – 11:28 – Zenica
Montenegro	14
Belarus	24
7 June 2015 – 11:50 – Zenica
Iceland	40
Liechtenstein	5

Final
7 June 2015 – 15:02 – Zenica
Belarus	17
Iceland	28
Third place
7 June 2015 – 14:40 – Zenica
Montenegro	57
Liechtenstein	0

==== Plate ====
Quarter-finals
7 June 2015 – 10:00 – Zenica
Ireland	38
Austria	10
7 June 2015 – 11:06 – Zenica
Estonia	10
Turkey	45
7 June 2015 – 10:22 – Zenica
Serbia	35
San Marino	7
7 June 2015 – 10:44 – Zenica
Bosnia and Herzegovina	26
Malta	17

Semi-finals
7 June 2015 – 13:12 – Zenica
Austria	24
Estonia	21
7 June 2015 – 13:34 – Zenica
San Marino	0
Malta	24

Final
7 June 2015 – 16:16 – Zenica
Austria	24
Malta	14
Third place
7 June 2015 – 15:54 – Zenica
Estonia	33
San Marino	21

==== Cup ====
Quarter-finals
7 June 2015 – 10:00 – Zenica
Ireland	38
Austria	10
7 June 2015 – 11:06 – Zenica
Estonia	10
Turkey	45
7 June 2015 – 10:22 – Zenica
Serbia	35
San Marino	7
7 June 2015 – 10:44 – Zenica
Bosnia and Herzegovina	26
Malta	17

Semi-finals
7 June 2015 – 13:56 – Zenica
Ireland	41
Turkey	0
7 June 2015 – 14:18 – Zenica
Serbia	10
Bosnia and Herzegovina	29

Final
7 June 2015 – 17:05 – Zenica
Ireland	50
Bosnia and Herzegovina	0
Third place
7 June 2015 – 16:43 – Zenica
Turkey	5
Serbia	21

== Division B ==
Ireland dominated the competition with six straight victories with winning margins of greater than 50-points, scoring 60 tries and conceding 0. Ireland’s Alex Wootton topped the scoring charts with 10 tries, with Shane Layden and David McGuigan scoring 7 tries apiece. The Player of the Tournament award went to Ireland’s Adam Byrne.

=== Standings ===
Legend
Qualified for the Rugby Europe Repechage Tournament
and Promoted to 2016 Trophy.
Promoted to 2016 Trophy.
Relegated to Conference 2 for 2016.

Rank	Team
1st place, gold medalist(s)	Ireland
2nd place, silver medalist(s)	Serbia
3rd place, bronze medalist(s)	Slovenia
4	Croatia
5	Norway
6	Switzerland
7	Slovakia
8	Malta
9	Bulgaria
10	Bosnia and Herzegovina
11	Austria
12	Greece

=== Pool stage ===
Key to colours in group tables
Teams that advanced to the Cup Quarterfinal

==== Pool A ====
Teams	Pld	W	D	L	PF	PA	+/−	Pts
Croatia	3	3	0	0	108	0	+108	9
Slovakia	3	2	0	1	62	77	–15	7
Malta	3	1	0	2	38	66	–28	5
Greece	3	0	0	3	24	89	–65	3

20 June 2015
11:00

Croatia	34–0	Malta
	Report

Zagreb

20 June 2015

Slovakia	35–19	Greece
	Report

Zagreb

20 June 2015

Croatia	28–0	Greece
	Report

Zagreb

20 June 2015

Slovakia	27–12	Malta
	Report

Zagreb

20 June 2015

Greece	5–26	Malta
	Report

Zagreb

20 June 2015

Croatia	46–0	Slovakia
	Report

Zagreb

==== Pool B ====
Teams	Pld	W	D	L	PF	PA	+/−	Pts
Ireland	3	3	0	0	175	0	+175	9
Slovenia	3	2	0	1	68	71	–3	7
Bulgaria	3	1	0	2	34	125	–91	5
Austria	3	0	0	3	33	114	–81	3

20 June 2015

Bulgaria	29–21	Austria
	Report

Zagreb

20 June 2015

Slovenia	0–54	Ireland
	Report

Zagreb

20 June 2015

Bulgaria	0 - 64	Ireland
	Report

Zagreb

20 June 2015

Slovenia	28–12	Austria
	Report

Zagreb

20 June 2015

Ireland	57–0	Austria
	Report

Zagreb

20 June 2015

Bulgaria	5–40	Slovenia
	Report

Zagreb

==== Pool C ====
Teams	Pld	W	D	L	PF	PA	+/−	Pts
Serbia	3	2	1	0	67	62	+5	8
Norway	3	2	0	1	72	58	+14	7
Switzerland	3	1	0	2	74	40	+34	5
Bosnia and Herzegovina	3	0	1	2	29	82	–53	4

20 June 2015

Switzerland	19–21	Serbia
	Report

Zagreb

20 June 2015

Norway	27–12	Bosnia and Herzegovina
	Report

Zagreb

20 June 2015

Switzerland	38–0	Bosnia and Herzegovina
	Report

Zagreb

20 June 2015

Norway	26–29	Serbia
	Report

Zagreb

20 June 2015

Bosnia and Herzegovina	17–17	Serbia
	Report

Zagreb

20 June 2015

Switzerland	17–19	Norway
	Report

Zagreb

=== Knockout stage ===
==== Bowl ====
Semi-finals
21 June 2015 – Zagreb
Bulgaria	38
Austria	0
21 June 2015 – Zagreb
Bosnia and Herzegovina	19
Greece	7

Final
21 June 2015 – Zagreb
Bulgaria	33
Bosnia and Herzegovina	17
Third place
21 June 2015 – Zagreb
Austria	49
Greece	14

==== Plate ====
Quarter-finals
21 June 2015 – Zagreb
Ireland	76
Malta	0
21 June 2015 – Zagreb
Norway	14
Slovenia	22
21 June 2015 – Zagreb
Croatia	21
Switzerland	12
21 June 2015 – Zagreb
Serbia	26
Slovakia	10

Semi-finals
21 June 2015 – Zagreb
Malta	12
Norway	33
21 June 2015 – Zagreb
Switzerland	55
Slovakia	5

Final
21 June 2015 – Zagreb
Norway	21
Switzerland	12
Third place
21 June 2015 – Zagreb
Malta	15
Slovakia	19

==== Cup ====
Quarter-finals
21 June 2015 – Zagreb
Ireland	76
Malta	0
21 June 2015 – Zagreb
Norway	14
Slovenia	22
21 June 2015 – Zagreb
Croatia	21
Switzerland	12
21 June 2015 – Zagreb
Serbia	26
Slovakia	10

Semi-finals
21 June 2015 – Zagreb
Ireland	59
Slovenia	0
21 June 2015 – Zagreb
Croatia	10
Serbia	15

Final
21 June 2015 – Zagreb
Ireland	74
Serbia	0
Third place
21 June 2015 – Zagreb
Slovenia	7
Croatia	5
