= 2017 Rugby Europe Sevens Conferences =

- Host nation: Conference 1: Bulgaria; Conference 2: Estonia
- Date: 1 July – 16 July

Conference 1
- Champion: Hungary
- Runner-up: Bulgaria

Conference 2
- Winner: Saint Petersburg
- Runner-up: Austria

The 2017 Rugby Europe Sevens Conferences are the lower divisions of Rugby Europe's 2017 sevens season. Conference 1 was held in Burgas, Bulgaria, with the two top-placing teams advancing to the 2018 Trophy. Conference 2 was held in Tallinn, Estonia, with the top two advancing to Conference 1 for 2018.

== Conference 1 ==
Will be held in Burgas, Bulgaria 1–2 July

Legend
Promoted to Trophy for 2018
Relegated to Conference 2 for 2018
Invited Team

Rank	Team
1	Hungary
2	Bulgaria
3	Slovakia
4	Malta
5	Serbia
6	Norway
7	Bosnia and Herzegovina
8	Turkey
9	Monaco
10	Slovenia
11	Montenegro
12	Burgas

=== Pool Stage ===
==== Pool A ====
Teams	Pld	W	D	L	PF	PA	+/−	Pts
Bulgaria	3	3	0	0	113	43	+70	9
Bosnia and Herzegovina	3	1	0	2	78	52	+26	5
Monaco	3	1	0	2	31	78	–47	5
Burgas	3	1	0	2	39	88	–49	5

Matches

1 July 2017
9:00

Monaco	5–15	Burgas

1 July 2017
9:22

Bulgaria	26–19	Bosnia and Herzegovina

1 July 2017
11:45

Monaco	21–14	Bosnia and Herzegovina

1 July 2017
12:07

Bulgaria	38–19	Burgas

1 July 2017
14:30

Monaco	5–49	Bulgaria

1 July 2017
14:52

Bosnia and Herzegovina	45–5	Burgas

==== Pool B ====
Teams	Pld	W	D	L	PF	PA	+/−	Pts
Malta	3	3	0	0	75	38	+37	9
Slovakia	3	2	0	1	83	42	+41	7
Norway	3	1	0	2	66	57	+9	5
Slovenia	3	0	0	3	17	104	–87	3

Matches

1 July 2017
9:44

Slovenia	7–31	Slovakia

1 July 2017
10:06

Norway	14–19	Malta

1 July 2017
12:29

Slovenia	5–35	Malta

1 July 2017
12:51

Norway	14–33	Slovakia

1 July 2017
15:14

Slovenia	5–38	Norway

1 July 2017
15:36

Malta	21–19	Slovakia

==== Pool C ====
Teams	Pld	W	D	L	PF	PA	+/−	Pts
Hungary	3	3	0	0	110	34	+76	9
Serbia	3	2	0	1	36	33	+3	7
Turkey	3	1	0	2	57	49	+8	5
Montenegro	3	0	0	3	22	109	–87	3

Matches

1 July 2017
10:28

Hungary	25–24	Turkey

1 July 2017
10:50

Serbia	24–0	Montenegro

1 July 2017
13:13

Hungary	59–10	Montenegro

1 July 2017
13:35

Serbia	12–7	Turkey

1 July 2017
15:58

Hungary	26–0	Serbia

1 July 2017
16:20

Montenegro	12–26	Turkey

=== Knockout stage ===
==== Challenge Trophy ====
Semi-finals
2 July 2017 – 11:28
Monaco	33
Montenegro	24
2 July 2017 – 11:50
Burgas	5
Slovenia	7

Final
2 July 2017 – 15:05
Monaco	22
Slovenia	5
Third place
2 July 2017 – 14:43
Montenegro	21
Burgas	14

==== 5th Place ====
Quarter-finals
2 July 2017 – 10:00
Bulgaria	26
Turkey	12
2 July 2017 – 11:06
Slovakia	24
Serbia	19
2 July 2017 – 10:22
Malta	31
Norway	24
2 July 2017 – 10:44
Hungary	45
Bosnia and Herzegovina	0

Semi-finals
2 July 2017 – 13:15
Turkey	0
Serbia	36
2 July 2017 – 13:37
Norway	28
Bosnia and Herzegovina	24

Final
2 July 2017 – 16:24
Serbia	21
Norway	7
Third place
2 July 2017 – 16:02
Turkey	12
Bosnia and Herzegovina	17

==== Cup ====
Quarter-finals
2 July 2017 – 10:00
Bulgaria	26
Turkey	12
2 July 2017 – 11:06
Slovakia	24
Serbia	19
2 July 2017 – 10:22
Malta	31
Norway	24
2 July 2017 – 10:44
Hungary	45
Bosnia and Herzegovina	0

Semi-finals
2 July 2017 – 13:59
Bulgaria	31
Slovakia	5
2 July 2017 – 14:21
Malta	7
Hungary	19

Final
2 July 2017 – 17:14
Bulgaria	12
Hungary	52
Third place
2 July 2017 – 16:52
Slovakia	19
Malta	15

== Conference 2 ==
Played in Tallinn, Estonia 15–16 July

Legend
Promoted to Conference 1 for 2018
Invited Team

Rank	Team
1	Saint Petersburg
2	Austria
3	Finland
4	Estonia
5	Liechtenstein
6	Belarus
7	San Marino
8	Iceland

=== Pool Stage ===
==== Pool A ====
Teams	Pld	W	D	L	PF	PA	+/−	Pts
Saint Petersburg	3	3	0	0	102	17	+85	9
Austria	3	2	0	1	59	47	+12	7
Belarus	3	1	0	2	38	77	–39	5
Liechtenstein	3	0	0	3	42	100	–58	3

Matches

15 July 2017
10:00

Austria	5–26	Saint Petersburg

15 July 2017
10:22

Liechtenstein	21–26	Belarus

15 July 2017
13:00

Liechtenstein	0–45	Saint Petersburg

15 July 2017
13:22

Austria	25–0	Belarus

15 July 2017
15:00

Belarus	12–31	Saint Petersburg

15 July 2017
15:22

Austria	29–21	Liechtenstein

==== Pool B ====
Teams	Pld	W	D	L	PF	PA	+/−	Pts
Finland	3	3	0	0	90	15	+75	9
Estonia	3	1	1	1	36	49	–13	6
San Marino	3	1	0	2	30	68	–38	5
Iceland	3	0	1	2	25	49	–24	4

Matches

15 July 2017
11:06

Iceland	5–24	Finland

15 July 2017
11:28

Estonia	21–10	San Marino

15 July 2017
13:44

Estonia	5–29	Finland

15 July 2017
14:06

Iceland	10–15	San Marino

15 July 2017
15:44

San Marino	5–37	Finland

15 July 2017
16:06

Iceland	10–10	Estonia

=== Knockout stage ===
Challenge Trophy

Semi-finals
16 July 2017 – 10:00
Belarus	12
Iceland	10
16 July 2017 – 10:22
San Marino	12
Liechtenstein	28

Final
16 July 2017 - 12:37
Belarus	15
Liechtenstein	38
Third place
16 July 2017 - 12:15
Iceland	5
San Marino	14

Cup

Semi-finals
16 July 2017 – 10:44
Saint Petersburg	43
Estonia	0
16 July 2017 – 11:06
Finland	10
Austria	24

Final
16 July 2017 - 13:45
Saint Petersburg	47
Austria	5
Third place
16 July 2017 - 13:10
Estonia	0
Finland	31
