= Rugby sevens at the 2027 European Games =

- Location: Istanbul, Turkey
- Dates: 23–26 June
- Competitors: 384 from 21 nations

Rugby sevens at the 2027 European Games will be held in Istanbul, Turkey.

The tournament serves as the European continental qualifier for the rugby sevens tournament at the 2028 Summer Olympics; the gold medalists in the men's and women's tournaments will qualify for the 2028 Summer Olympics in Los Angeles, while the runner-up, and potentially the bronze medalist, will progress to the final Olympic Sevens repechage tournament for the final place at the Games.

The fields in both men's and women's sevens are expanded from the 2023 edition to sixteen teams.

== Qualification ==
The 16 teams in each event qualified based on their final rankings from the 2026 Rugby Europe 7s Championship and Trophy divisions. Reserve tems may be entered in the event that European nations (i.e. France or Spain) gain Olympic qualification through the 2027 SVNS series, the primary qualification tournament for the Olympic Games.

=== Men's ===
- France
- Italy
- Belgium
- Germany
- Portugal
- Spain
- Great Britain
- Georgia
- Czechia
- Ukraine
- Switzerland
- Romania
- Lithuania
- Poland
- Turkey - (host)
- Monaco

- reserves
- Sweden
- Croatia

(replacing France or Spain if either qualify via the HSBC SVNS Series)

=== Women's ===
- Poland
- France
- Ireland
- Spain
- Belgium
- Germany
- Portugal
- Czechia
- Great Britain
- Denmark
- Ukraine
- Italy
- Sweden
- Turkey
- Moldova
- Hungary

- reserves
- Georgia
- Norway

(replacing France or Spain if either qualify via the HSBC SVNS Series)

== Participating NOCs ==
The following National Olympic Committees (NOCs), as per the outcome of qualification events, will participate (the number of participating athletes of each NOC are shown in parentheses).

- Belgium (26)
- Czech Republic (26)
- Denmark (13)
- France (26)
- Georgia (13)
- Germany (26)
- Great Britain (26)
- Hungary (13)
- Ireland (13)
- Italy (26)
- Lithuania (13)
- Monaco (13)
- Moldova (13)
- Poland (26)
- Portugal (26)
- Romania (13)
- Spain (26)
- Sweden (13)
- Switzerland (13)
- Turkey (26)
- Ukraine (26)

== Medal summary ==
=== Medal table ===
* Host nation (Turkey)

Rank	NOC	Gold	Silver	Bronze	Total
1	Turkey*	0	0	0	0
Totals (1 entries)		0	0	0	0

=== Medalists ===
Event	Gold	Silver	Bronze
Men			
Women			

== Los Angeles 2028 qualification ==
The rugby sevens tournament at the 2027 European Games is a direct qualification event for the rugby sevens program in LA 2028. A total of 2 (team) quota places will be awarded in two events:

Event	Qualification path	Quotas	NOCS
Men's tournament:	The winner of the European Games rugby sevens tournament will earn one team quota place	1	
Women's tournament	The winner of the European Games rugby sevens tournament will earn one team quota place	1	
Total quota places		2	

Teams finishing second and potential third will progress to the final Los Angeles qualifier.
