= 2016 Rugby Europe Sevens Conferences =

- Host nation: Conference 1: Bulgaria; Conference 2: Hungary
- Date: 2-24 July

Conference 1
- Champion: Croatia
- Runner-up: Luxembourg

Conference 2
- Winner: Malta
- Runner-up: Montenegro

The 2016 Rugby Europe Sevens Conferences were the lower divisions of Rugby Europe's 2016 sevens season. Conference 1 was held in Burgas, Bulgaria, with the two top-placing teams advancing to the 2017 Trophy, while Conference 2 was held in Esztergom, Hungary, with the top two advancing to Conference 1 for 2017.

== Conference 1 ==
=== Final standings ===
Legend
Promoted to Trophy for 2017
Relegated to Conference 2 for 2017

Rank	Team
1	Croatia
2	Luxembourg
3	Hungary
4	Serbia
5	Norway
6	Bulgaria
7	Switzerland
8	Bosnia and Herzegovina
9	Turkey
10	Slovakia

All Matches were held in Burgas, Bulgaria.

Key to colours in group tables
Teams that advance to Cup Semifinal
Teams that advance to Plate Semifinal

=== Pool Stage ===
==== Pool A ====
Teams	Pld	W	D	L	PF	PA	+/−	Pts
Hungary	4	4	0	0	84	24	+60	12
Serbia	4	3	0	1	102	22	+80	10
Switzerland	4	1	0	3	48	64	-16	6
Bosnia and Herzegovina	4	1	0	3	36	79	-43	6
Slovakia	4	1	0	3	24	105	-81	6

Matches

2 July 2016

Serbia	0-12	Hungary

2 July 2016

Switzerland	5-12	Slovakia

2 July 2016

Hungary	10-5	Bosnia and Herzegovina

2 July 2016

Switzerland	5-19	Serbia

2 July 2016

Slovakia	12-19	Bosnia and Herzegovina

2 July 2016

Hungary	26-19	Switzerland

2 July 2016

Slovakia	0-45	Serbia

2 July 2016

Switzerland	19-7	Bosnia and Herzegovina

2 July 2016

Hungary	36-0	Slovakia

2 July 2016

Bosnia and Herzegovina	5-38	Serbia

==== Pool B ====
Teams	Pld	W	D	L	PF	PA	+/−	Pts
Luxembourg	4	4	0	0	108	41	+67	12
Croatia	4	3	0	1	67	43	+24	10
Bulgaria	4	2	0	2	70	88	-18	8
Norway	4	1	0	3	64	82	-18	6
Turkey	4	0	0	4	43	98	-55	4

Matches

2 July 2016

Turkey	7-17	Croatia

2 July 2016

Norway	19-22	Bulgaria

2 July 2016

Croatia	7-15	Luxembourg

2 July 2016

Norway	31-12	Turkey

2 July 2016

Bulgaria	10-38	Luxembourg

2 July 2016

Croatia	7-15	Norway

2 July 2016

Bulgaria	24-7	Turkey

2 July 2016

Norway	7-29	Luxembourg

2 July 2016

Croatia	24-14	Bulgaria

2 July 2016

Luxembourg	26-17	Turkey

=== Knockout stage ===
Bowl

Final
3 July 2016 – TBA
Slovakia	12
Turkey	29

Plate

Semi-finals
3 July 2016 – TBA
Norway	12
Switzerland	5
3 July – TBA
Bosnia and Herzegovina	12
Bulgaria	19

Final
3 July 2016 - TBA
Norway	19
Bulgaria	5
Third place
3 July 2016 - TBA
Switzerland	33
Bosnia and Herzegovina	0

Cup

Semi-finals
3 July 2016 – TBA
Hungary	5
Croatia	17
3 July – TBA
Serbia	7
Luxembourg	36

Final
3 July 2016 - TBA
Croatia	45
Luxembourg	14
Third place
3 July 2016 - TBA
Hungary	19
Serbia	12

== Conference 2 ==
All matches were held in Esztergom, Hungary

=== Final standings ===
Legend
Promoted to Conference 1 for 2017

Rank	Team
1	Malta
2	Montenegro
3	Austria
4	Iceland
5	Estonia
6	Liechtenstein
7	Belarus
8	San Marino

=== Pool stage ===
==== Pool A ====
Teams	Pld	W	D	L	PF	PA	+/−	Pts
Austria	3	3	0	0	82	19	+63	9
Iceland	3	2	0	1	39	33	+6	7
Liechtenstein	3	1	0	2	42	36	+6	5
San Marino	3	0	0	3	7	82	-75	3

Matches

23 July 2016

Austria	21-14	Liechtenstein

23 July 2016

San Marino	7-19	Iceland

23 July 2016

San Marino	0-14	Liechtenstein

23 July 2016

Austria	12-5	Iceland

23 July 2016

Iceland	15-14	Liechtenstein

23 July 2016

Austria	49-0	San Marino

==== Pool B ====
Teams	Pld	W	D	L	PF	PA	+/−	Pts
Malta	3	3	0	0	92	7	+85	9
Montenegro	3	2	0	1	48	52	-4	7
Estonia	3	1	0	2	19	60	-41	5
Belarus	3	0	0	3	26	66	-40	3

Matches

23 July 2016

Malta	35-0	Montenegro

23 July 2016

Estonia	14-7	Belarus

23 July 2016

Estonia	5-29	Montenegro

23 July 2016

Malta	33-7	Belarus

23 July 2016

Belarus	12-19	Montenegro

23 July 2016

Malta	24-0	Estonia

=== Knockout stage ===
Bowl

Semi-finals
24 July 2016 – TBA
Liechtenstein	12
Belarus	7
24 July – TBA
Estonia	31
San Marino	0

Final
24 July 2016 - TBA
Liechtenstein	5
Estonia	14
Third place
24 July 2016 - TBA
Belarus	12
San Marino	10

Cup

Semi-finals
24 July 2016 – TBA
Austria	7
Montenegro	12
24 July – TBA
Malta	19
Iceland	0

Final
24 July 2016 - TBA
Montenegro	0
Malta	19
Third place
24 July 2016 - TBA
Austria	26
Iceland	7
