= 2021 Rugby Europe Sevens Conference =

- Hosts: Serbia
- Date: 5–6 June 2021
- Nations: 9

Final positions
- Champions: Bulgaria
- Runners-up: Monaco
- Third: Moldova

Series details
- Matches played: 27

The 2021 Rugby Europe Sevens Conference was the third tier tournament of Rugby Europe's 2021 sevens season. It was held in Belgrade, Serbia on 5–6 June 2021, with the top two advancing to the 2022 Sevens Trophy. As winner of the tournament, Bulgaria advances to Trophy tournament in 2021, with second placed Monaco.

Tournament consist of three phases, with first two used as qualifications for third where teams played for places.

== Phase 1 ==
All times in Central European Summer Time (UTC+02:00)

=== Pool A ===
Team	Pld	W	D	L	PF	PA	PD	Pts
Bulgaria	2	2	0	0	76	26	+50	6
Andorra	2	1	0	1	36	34	+2	4
Montenegro	2	0	0	2	17	69	-52	2

5 June 2021
10:00

Bulgaria	29–14	Andorra

5 June 2021
12:15

Montenegro	5–22	Andorra

5 June 2021
14:30

Bulgaria	47–12	Montenegro

=== Pool B ===
Team	Pld	W	D	L	PF	PA	PD	Pts
Moldova	2	2	0	0	49	19	+30	6
Serbia	2	1	0	1	45	37	+8	4
Slovenia	2	0	0	2	17	55	-38	2

5 June 2021
10:22

Moldova	29–0	Slovenia

5 June 2021
12:37

Serbia	26–17	Slovenia

5 June 2021
14:52

Moldova	20–19	Serbia

=== Pool C ===
Team	Pld	W	D	L	PF	PA	PD	Pts
Monaco	2	2	0	0	86	33	+53	6
Austria	2	1	0	1	57	53	+4	4
San Marino	2	0	0	2	19	76	-57	2

5 June 2021
10:44

Monaco	45–7	San Marino

5 June 2021
12:59

Austria	31–12	San Marino

5 June 2021
15:14

Monaco	41–26	Austria

== Phase 2 ==
All times in Central European Summer Time (UTC+02:00)

=== Pool D ===
Team	Pld	W	D	L	PF	PA	PD	Pts
Bulgaria	2	2	0	0	57	19	+38	6
Austria	2	1	0	1	45	31	+14	4
Slovenia	2	0	0	2	19	71	-52	2

5 June 2021
16:45

Bulgaria	33–12	Slovenia

5 June 2021
19:30

Austria	38–7	Slovenia

6 June 2021
11:00

Bulgaria	24–7	Austria

=== Pool E ===
Team	Pld	W	D	L	PF	PA	PD	Pts
Moldova	2	2	0	0	45	10	+35	6
Andorra	2	1	0	1	34	17	+17	4
San Marino	2	0	0	2	12	64	-52	2

5 June 2021
17:27

Moldova	35–5	San Marino

5 June 2021
19:52

Andorra	29–7	San Marino

6 June 2021
11:22

Moldova	10–5	Andorra

=== Pool F ===
Team	Pld	W	D	L	PF	PA	PD	Pts
Monaco	2	2	0	0	60	31	+29	6
Montenegro	2	1	0	1	43	53	-10	4
Serbia	2	0	0	2	25	44	-19	2

5 June 2021
17:47

Monaco	38–21	Montenegro

5 June 2021
20:14

Serbia	15–22	Montenegro

6 June 2021
11:44

Monaco	22–10	Serbia

== Phase 3 ==
All times in Central European Summer Time (UTC+02:00)

=== Pool G ===
Team	Pld	W	D	L	PF	PA	PD	Pts
Bulgaria	2	2	0	0	38	29	+9	6
Monaco	2	1	0	1	39	42	-3	4
Moldova	2	0	0	2	35	41	-6	2

6 June 2021
13:59

Bulgaria	17–14	Moldova

6 June 2021
16:14

Monaco	24–21	Moldova

6 June 2021
18:29

Bulgaria	21–15	Monaco

=== Pool H ===
Team	Pld	W	D	L	PF	PA	PD	Pts
Austria	2	2	0	0	49	26	+23	6
Andorra	2	0	1	1	36	38	-2	3
Serbia	2	0	1	1	24	45	-21	3

6 June 2021
13:37

Andorra	17–17	Serbia

6 June 2021
15:52

Austria	28–7	Serbia

6 June 2021
18:07

Andorra	19–21	Austria

=== Pool I ===
Team	Pld	W	D	L	PF	PA	PD	Pts
Montenegro	2	1	0	1	36	17	+19	4
Slovenia	2	1	0	1	24	29	-5	4
San Marino	2	1	0	1	24	38	-14	4

6 June 2021
13:15

Montenegro	26–5	San Marino

6 June 2021
15:30

Slovenia	12–19	San Marino

6 June 2021
17:45

Montenegro	10–12	Slovenia

== Standings ==
Legend
Promoted to 2021 Trophy

Rank	Team
1st place, gold medalist(s)	Bulgaria
2nd place, silver medalist(s)	Monaco
3rd place, bronze medalist(s)	Moldova
4	Austria
5	Andorra
6	Serbia
7	Montenegro
8	Slovenia
9	San Marino
