= 2016 Rugby Europe Under-18 Sevens Trophy =

- Host nation: Hungary
- Date: 17–18 September

Cup
- Champion: Lithuania
- Runner-up: Sweden
- Third: Switzerland

Plate
- Winner: Ukraine
- Runner-up: Monaco

Bowl
- Winner: Hungary
- Runner-up: Andorra

Tournament details
- Matches played: 34

The 2016 Rugby Europe Under-18 Sevens Trophy was hosted by Hungary in Esztergom from 17–18 September.

== Teams ==
- Latvia
- Monaco
- Slovenia
- Bulgaria
- Lithuania
- Ukraine
- Sweden
- Denmark
- Hungary
- Andorra
- Switzerland
- Slovakia

== Pool stages ==
Legend
	Qualified for the Cup Quarterfinals
	Qualified for the Bowl Semifinals

=== Pool A ===
Team	P	W	D	L	PF	PA	PD
Latvia	3	3	0	0	86	5	81
Monaco	3	2	0	1	67	24	43
Bulgaria	3	1	0	2	43	33	10
Slovenia	3	0	0	3	0	114	-114

17 September

Latvia	29 - 0	Bulgaria

Referee: (Belgium) N. Vandecauter

17 September

Monaco	38 - 0	Slovenia

Referee: (Hungary) N. Matrai

17 September

Latvia	38 - 0	Slovenia

Referee: (Hungary) C. Priskin

17 September

Monaco	24 - 5	Bulgaria

Referee: (Lithuania) R. Grumbinas

17 September

Latvia	19 - 5	Monaco

Referee: (Denmark) D. Maughan

17 September

Slovenia	0 - 38	Bulgaria

Referee: (France) J. Rozier

=== Pool B ===
Team	P	W	D	L	PF	PA	PD
Sweden	3	3	0	0	71	7	64
Lithuania	3	2	0	1	55	26	29
Ukraine	3	1	0	2	35	45	-10
Slovakia	3	0	0	3	12	95	-83

17 September

Lithuania	29 - 5	Slovakia

Referee: (Hungary) C. Priskin

17 September

Ukraine	0 - 19	Sweden

Referee: (Lithuania) R. Grumbinas

17 September

Lithuania	7 - 14	Sweden

Referee: (Denmark) D. Maughan

17 September

Ukraine	28 - 7	Slovakia

Referee: (France) J. Rozier

17 September

Lithuania	19 - 7	Ukraine

Referee: (Belgium) N. Vandecauter

17 September

Sweden	38 - 0	Slovakia

Referee: (Hungary) N. Matrai

=== Pool C ===
Team	P	W	D	L	PF	PA	PD
Switzerland	3	2	1	0	65	33	32
Denmark	3	2	0	1	39	19	20
Hungary	3	1	0	2	12	54	-42
Andorra	3	0	1	2	40	50	-10

17 September

Denmark	7 - 12	Switzerland

Referee: (Denmark) D. Maughan

17 September

Hungary	12 - 7	Andorra

Referee: (France) J. Rozier

17 September

Denmark	12 - 7	Andorra

Referee: (Hungary) N. Matrai

17 September

Hungary	0 - 27	Switzerland

Referee: (Belgium) N. Vandecauter

17 September

Andorra	26 - 26	Switzerland

Referee: (Hungary) C. Priskin

17 September

Denmark	20 - 0	Hungary

Referee: (Lithuania) R. Grumbinas

== Finals ==
Cup Quarterfinals

Quarter-finals
Latvia	17
Ukraine	10
Sweden	38
Bulgaria	0
Switzerland	28
Monaco	19
Lithuania	26
Denmark	7

Semi-finals
Lithuania	17
Latvia	0
Sweden	26
Switzerland	0

Cup Final
Lithuania	24
Sweden	19
3rd Place
Switzerland	24
Latvia	0

Plate Semifinals

Semi-finals
Ukraine	26
Denmark	14
Monaco	35
Bulgaria	0

Plate Final
Ukraine	35
Monaco	10
7th Place
Denmark	55
Bulgaria	0

Bowl Semifinals

Semi-finals
Hungary	36
Slovenia	0
Andorra	26
Slovakia	5

Bowl Final
Hungary	5
Andorra	0
11th Place
Slovakia	24
Slovenia	0

== Final standings ==
Rank	Team
1st place, gold medalist(s)	Lithuania
2nd place, silver medalist(s)	Sweden
3rd place, bronze medalist(s)	Switzerland
4	Latvia
5	Ukraine
6	Monaco
7	Denmark
8	Bulgaria
9	Hungary
10	Andorra
11	Slovakia
12	Slovenia
