= 2006 European Sevens Championship =

Fifth edition of the European Sevens rugby championship

Tournament details
- Host nation: RUS
- Dates: –

Final positions
- Champions: Portugal
- Runner-up: Russia

The 2006 European Sevens Championship was a rugby sevens competition, with the final held in Moscow, Russia. It was the fifth edition of the European Sevens championship. The event was organised by rugby's European governing body, the FIRA – Association of European Rugby (FIRA-AER). Final:

- Portugal, 19 - Russia, 7

Preliminary Rounds

Sopot 7's, Poland (27 / 28 May 2006)

Split 7's, Croatia (27 / 28 May 2006)

Lunel 7's, France (03 / 4 June 2006)

Madrid 7's, Spain (14 June 2006)

== First round ==
=== Pool A ===
- Azerbaijan 22 - 10 Norway
- Portugal 26 - 00 Andorra
- Croatia 46 - 00 Norway
- Andorra 54 - 05 Azerbaijan
- Portugal 26 - 00 Croatia
- Andorra 68 - 00 Norway
- Croatia 55 - 00 Azerbaijan
- Portugal 54 - 00 Norway
- Andorra 24 - 00 Croatia
- Portugal 63 - 00 Azerbaijan

=== Pool B ===
- Belgium 35 - 07 Malta
- Spain 53 - 00 INVITATION 7's
- Belgium 43 - 07 Germany
- Malta 28 - 14 INVITATION 7's
- Spain 38 - 07 Germany
- Belgium 24 - 14 INVITATION 7's
- Germany 24 - 05 Malta
- Spain 24 - 00 Belgium
- Germany 28 - 07 INVITATION 7's
- Spain 31 - 00 Malta

== Second round ==
=== Bowl Semifinals ===
- Germany 50 - 00 Azerbaijan
- Croatia 38 - 07 Malta

=== Cup Semifinals ===
- Spain 19 - 12 Andorra
- Portugal 48 - 00 Belgium

=== 9th Place ===
- INVITATION 7's 28 - 00 Norway

=== 7th Place ===
- Malta 33 - 00 Azerbaijan

=== 5th Place ===
- Germany 28 - 12 Croatia

=== 3rd Place ===
- Andorra 26 - 07 Belgium

=== Cup Final ===
- Portugal 17 - 12 Spain

Budapest 7's, Hungary (10 / 11 June 2006)

Tbilisi 7's, Georgia (17 / 18 June 2006)

Final Round

Moscow 7's, Russia (15 / 16 July 2006)

== Final standings ==
Rank	Team
1st place, gold medalist(s)	Portugal
2nd place, silver medalist(s)	Russia
3rd place, bronze medalist(s)	Italy
4	France
5	Georgia
6	Romania
7	Moldova
8	Spain
9	Lithuania
10	Croatia
11	Ukraine
12	Andorra
