= 2023 Rugby Europe Sevens Trophy =

- Hosts: Croatia; Hungary
- Date: 16 June–9 July 2023
- Nations: 12

Final positions
- Champions: Ukraine
- Runners-up: Croatia
- Third: Sweden

Series details
- Matches played: 136

The 2023 Rugby Europe Sevens Trophy was the second division of Rugby Europe's 2023 sevens season. This edition was hosted by the cities of Zagreb and Budapest on 16–18 June and 8–9 July. The two highest-placed teams were promoted to the 2024 Championship series. The two teams with the fewest points were relegated to the 2024 Conference.

== Schedule ==
Date	Venue	Stadium	Winner
16–18 June	Zagreb	Stadion Lučko	Ukraine
8–9 July	Budapest	Budapest Rugby Centre	Latvia

== Standings ==
Legend
Promoted to 2024 Championship
Relegated to 2024 Conference

2023 Rugby Europe Sevens Trophy
Pos	Event Team	Zagreb	Budapest	Points total
1	Ukraine	20	18	38
2	Croatia	18	14	32 (Note: Tie-breaker margin of points scored for and against in all matches: Croatia +86, Sweden +26.)
3	Sweden	16	16	32
4	Latvia	10	20	30
5	Hungary	14	12	26
6	Switzerland	12	10	22
7	Luxembourg	6	4	10 (Note: Tie-breaker margin of points scored for and against in all matches: Luxembourg –38, Poland –51, Moldova –87.)
8	Poland	8	2	10
9	Moldova	2	8	10
10	Israel	3	6	9
11	Denmark	4	3	7
12	Bulgaria	1	1	2

== Zagreb ==
=== Pool stage ===
==== Pool A ====
Team	Pld	W	D	L	PF	PA	PD	Pts
Ukraine	3	3	0	0	83	34	+49	9
Poland	3	2	0	1	54	59	–5	7
Luxembourg	3	1	0	2	47	60	–13	5
Denmark	3	0	0	3	39	70	–31	3

Luxembourg	26–17	Denmark

Poland	17–33	Ukraine

Luxembourg	7–21	Ukraine

Poland	15–12	Denmark

Denmark	10–29	Ukraine

Poland	22–14	Luxembourg

==== Pool B ====
Team	Pld	W	D	L	PF	PA	PD	Pts
Hungary	3	3	0	0	80	45	+35	9
Latvia	3	2	0	1	72	28	+44	7
Israel	3	1	0	2	43	78	–35	5
Moldova	3	0	0	3	42	86	–44	3

Israel	0–29	Latvia

Hungary	31–14	Moldova

Israel	24–21	Moldova

Hungary	21–12	Latvia

Latvia	31–7	Moldova

Hungary	28–19	Israel

==== Pool C ====
Team	Pld	W	D	L	PF	PA	PD	Pts
Croatia	3	3	0	0	77	43	+34	9
Sweden	3	2	0	1	52	50	+2	7
Switzerland	3	1	0	2	60	61	–1	5
Bulgaria	3	0	0	3	52	87	–35	3

Sweden	14–12	Switzerland

Croatia	25–19	Bulgaria

Sweden	21–14	Bulgaria

Croatia	28–7	Switzerland

Bulgaria	19–41	Switzerland

Sweden	17–24	Croatia

=== Knockout stage ===
==== 9th Place ====
Semi-finals
Israel	19
Moldova	7
Denmark	38
Bulgaria	5

Ninth place
Israel	14
Denmark	21
Eleventh place
Moldova	26
Bulgaria	10

==== 5th Place ====
Semi-finals
Luxembourg	14
Latvia	15
Switzerland	33
Poland	29

Fifth place
Latvia	19
Switzerland	21
Seventh place
Luxembourg	19
Poland	29

==== Cup ====
Quarter-finals
Ukraine	26
Luxembourg	12
Latvia	12
Sweden	17
Hungary	24
Switzerland	17
Croatia	31
Poland	12

Semi-finals
Ukraine	26
Sweden	5
Hungary	21
Croatia	26

Final
Ukraine	41
Croatia	5
Third place
Sweden	22
Hungary	14

== Budapest ==
=== Pool stage ===
==== Pool A ====
Team	Pld	W	D	L	PF	PA	PD	Pts
Ukraine	3	3	0	0	90	22	+68	9
Latvia	3	1	1	1	60	54	+6	6
Bulgaria	3	1	0	2	50	77	–27	5
Poland	3	0	1	2	22	69	–47	4

Ukraine	36–5	Bulgaria

Latvia	12–12	Poland

Ukraine	33–0	Poland

Latvia	31–21	Bulgaria

Poland	10–24	Bulgaria

Ukraine	21–17	Latvia

==== Pool B ====
Team	Pld	W	D	L	PF	PA	PD	Pts
Croatia	3	3	0	0	81	26	+55	9
Moldova	3	2	0	1	50	86	–36	7
Switzerland	3	1	0	2	55	52	+3	5
Luxembourg	3	0	0	3	59	81	–22	3

Croatia	43–0	Moldova

Switzerland	26–19	Luxembourg

Croatia	24–14	Luxembourg

Switzerland	17–19	Moldova

Luxembourg	26–31	Moldova

Croatia	14–12	Switzerland

==== Pool C ====
Team	Pld	W	D	L	PF	PA	PD	Pts
Israel	3	3	0	0	36	24	+12	9
Sweden	3	1	1	1	55	34	+21	6
Hungary	3	0	2	1	31	38	–7	5
Denmark	3	0	1	2	36	62	–26	4

Sweden	14–15	Israel

Hungary	19–19	Denmark

Sweden	29–7	Denmark

Hungary	0–7	Israel

Denmark	10–14	Israel

Sweden	12–12	Hungary

=== Knockout stage ===
==== 9th Place ====
Semi-finals
Bulgaria	12
Luxembourg	22
Denmark	17
Poland	12

Ninth place
Luxembourg	24
Denmark	12
Eleventh place
Bulgaria	14
Poland	33

==== 5th Place ====
Semi-finals
Hungary	28
Moldova	19
Switzerland	33
Israel	5

Fifth place
Hungary	19
Switzerland	7
Seventh place
Moldova	26
Israel	14

==== Cup ====
Quarter-finals
Ukraine	19
Hungary	12
Moldova	12
Sweden	26
Croatia	38
Switzerland	15
Israel	12
Latvia	24

Semi-finals
Ukraine	19
Sweden	14
Croatia	14
Latvia	26

Final
Ukraine	17
Latvia	29
Third place
Sweden	12
Croatia	10
