= 2021 Rugby Europe Sevens Trophy =

- Hosts: Croatia; Hungary
- Date: 19–20 June; 10–11 July
- Nations: 12 (+1 invited)

Final positions
- Champions: Czech Republic
- Runners-up: Belgium
- Third: Ukraine

Series details
- Matches played: 34

The 2021 Rugby Europe Sevens Trophy was the second division of Rugby Europe's 2021 sevens season. This edition was hosted by the cities of Zagreb and Budapest on 19–20 June and 10–11 July. The two highest-placed teams were promoted to the 2022 Championship series. The two teams with the fewest points were relegated to the 2022 Conference.

The Czech Republic won the competition and was promoted to the Championship along with second place finishers Belgium. Denmark and Turkey were relegated to the Conference.

== Schedule ==
| Date | Venue | Stadium | Winner |
|---|---|---|---|
| 19–20 June | Zagreb | NŠC Stjepan Spajić | Czech Republic |
| 10–11 July | Budapest | Budapest Rugby Center | Belgium |

== Standings ==
Legend
Promoted to 2022 Championship
Relegated to 2022 Conference

2021 Rugby Europe Sevens Trophy
| Pos | Event Team | Zagreb | Budapest | Points total |
|---|---|---|---|---|
| 1 | Czech Republic | 20 | 18 | 38 |
| 2 | Belgium | 16 | 20 | 36 |
| 3 | Ukraine | 18 | 16 | 34 |
| 4 | Sweden | 12 | 14 | 26 |
| 5 | Israel | 14 | 8 | 22 (Note: Tie-breaker margin of points scored for and against in all matches: Israel +71, Romania +2.) |
| 6 | Romania | 10 | 12 | 22 |
| 7 | Latvia | 3 | 10 | 13 |
| 8 | Croatia | 8 | 2 | 10 |
| 9 | Luxembourg | 6 | 3 | 9 |
| 10 | Hungary | 4 | 4 | 8 |
| 11 | Denmark (Note: Denmark were not a participant in the first tournament but were given one point because they are a core team in the Trophy tier.) | —^{1} | 6 | 7 |
| 12 | Turkey (Note: Bulgaria were a participant in the first tournament and were a substitute for Denmark's absence. As they are not a core team, they were replaced by Turkey, and their points were transferred.) | —^{2} | 1 | 3 |

== Zagreb ==
All times in Central European Summer Time (UTC+02:00)

=== Pool Stage ===
==== Pool A ====
| Team | Pld | W | D | L | PF | PA | PD | Pts |
|---|---|---|---|---|---|---|---|---|
| Israel | 3 | 3 | 0 | 0 | 106 | 19 | +31 | 9 |
| Romania | 3 | 2 | 0 | 1 | 82 | 49 | +33 | 7 |
| Sweden | 3 | 1 | 0 | 2 | 45 | 57 | -12 | 5 |
| Bulgaria | 3 | 0 | 0 | 3 | 31 | 139 | -108 | 3 |

19 June 2021
10:00

| Romania | 40–14 | Bulgaria |

19 June 2021
10:22

| Sweden | 0–17 | Israel |

19 June 2021
13:00

| Romania | 14–28 | Israel |

19 June 2021
13:22

| Sweden | 38–12 | Bulgaria |

19 June 2021
16:00

| Romania | 28–7 | Sweden |

19 June 2021
16:22

| Israel | 61–5 | Bulgaria |

==== Pool B ====
| Team | Pld | W | D | L | PF | PA | PD | Pts |
|---|---|---|---|---|---|---|---|---|
| Czech Republic | 3 | 2 | 0 | 1 | 74 | 24 | +50 | 7 |
| Ukraine | 3 | 2 | 0 | 1 | 67 | 22 | +45 | 7 |
| Luxembourg | 3 | 2 | 0 | 1 | 60 | 36 | +24 | 7 |
| Turkey | 3 | 0 | 0 | 3 | 5 | 124 | -119 | 3 |

19 June 2021
10:44

| Ukraine | 38–0 | Turkey |

19 June 2021
11:06

| Czech Republic | 12–14 | Luxembourg |

19 June 2021
13:44

| Ukraine | 24–12 | Luxembourg |

19 June 2021
14:06

| Czech Republic | 52–5 | Turkey |

19 June 2021
16:44

| Ukraine | 5–10 | Czech Republic |

19 June 2021
17:06

| Luxembourg | 34–0 | Turkey |

==== Pool C ====
| Team | Pld | W | D | L | PF | PA | PD | Pts |
|---|---|---|---|---|---|---|---|---|
| Belgium | 3 | 3 | 0 | 0 | 120 | 7 | +113 | 9 |
| Croatia | 3 | 2 | 0 | 1 | 48 | 66 | -18 | 7 |
| Latvia | 3 | 1 | 0 | 2 | 31 | 57 | -26 | 5 |
| Hungary | 3 | 0 | 0 | 3 | 12 | 81 | -69 | 3 |

19 June 2021
11:28

| Belgium | 40–7 | Hungary |

19 June 2021
11:50

| Croatia | 31–7 | Latvia |

19 June 2021
14:28

| Belgium | 26–0 | Latvia |

19 June 2021
14:50

| Croatia | 17–5 | Hungary |

19 June 2021
17:28

| Belgium | 54–0 | Croatia |

19 June 2021
17:50

| Latvia | 24–0 | Hungary |

=== Knockout stage ===
==== 9th Place ====
Semi-finals
20 June 2021 – 13:00
Latvia | 12
Turkey | 7
20 June 2021 – 13:22
Hungary | 50
Bulgaria | 5

Ninth place
20 June 2021 – 16:22
Latvia | 7
Hungary | 17
Eleventh place
20 June 2021 – 16:00
Turkey | 19
Bulgaria | 24

==== 5th Place ====
Semi-finals
20 June 2021 – 14:28
Romania | 22
Luxembourg | 0
20 June 2021 – 14:06
Croatia | 10
Sweden | 33

Fifth place
20 June 2021 – 17:06
Romania | 14
Sweden | 31
Seventh place
20 June 2021 – 16:44
Luxembourg | 7
Croatia | 10

==== Cup ====
Quarter-finals
20 June 2021 – 11:44
Romania | 7
Belgium | 36
20 June 2021 – 11:22
Czech Republic | 31
Luxembourg | 12
20 June 2021 – 12:06
Ukraine | 28
Croatia | 19
20 June 2021 – 11:00
Sweden | 5
Israel | 12

Semi-finals
20 June 2021 – 15:22
Belgium | 17
Czech Republic | 19
20 June 2021 – 15:00
Ukraine | 29
Israel | 7

Final
20 June 2021 – 18:25
Czech Republic | 29
Ukraine | 12
Third place
20 June 2021 – 17:30
Belgium | 29
Israel | 5

== Budapest ==
All times in Central European Summer Time (UTC+02:00)

=== Pool Stage ===
==== Pool A ====
| Team | Pld | W | D | L | PF | PA | PD | Pts |
|---|---|---|---|---|---|---|---|---|
| Czech Republic | 3 | 3 | 0 | 0 | 71 | 41 | +30 | 9 |
| Romania | 3 | 2 | 0 | 1 | 60 | 38 | +22 | 7 |
| Denmark | 3 | 1 | 0 | 2 | 48 | 59 | -11 | 5 |
| Croatia | 3 | 0 | 0 | 3 | 31 | 72 | -41 | 3 |

10 Jule 2021
10:00

| Czech Republic | 26–14 | Denmark |

10 Jule 2021
10:22

| Romania | 24–7 | Croatia |

10 Jule 2021
14:30

| Czech Republic | 26–12 | Croatia |

10 Jule 2021
14:52

| Romania | 21–12 | Denmark |

10 Jule 2021
18:00

| Czech Republic | 19–15 | Romania |

10 Jule 2021
18:22

| Croatia | 12–22 | Denmark |

==== Pool B ====
| Team | Pld | W | D | L | PF | PA | PD | Pts |
|---|---|---|---|---|---|---|---|---|
| Ukraine | 3 | 3 | 0 | 0 | 121 | 10 | +111 | 9 |
| Sweden | 3 | 2 | 0 | 1 | 48 | 33 | +15 | 7 |
| Luxembourg | 3 | 1 | 0 | 2 | 29 | 62 | -33 | 5 |
| Turkey | 3 | 0 | 0 | 3 | 15 | 108 | -93 | 3 |

10 July 2021
10:44

| Ukraine | 64–5 | Turkey |

10 July 2021
11:06

| Sweden | 28–0 | Luxembourg |

10 July 2021
15:14

| Ukraine | 29–0 | Luxembourg |

10 July 2021
15:36

| Sweden | 15–5 | Turkey |

10 July 2021
18:44

| Ukraine | 28–5 | Sweden |

10 July 2021
19:06

| Luxembourg | 29–5 | Turkey |

==== Pool C ====
| Team | Pld | W | D | L | PF | PA | PD | Pts |
|---|---|---|---|---|---|---|---|---|
| Belgium | 3 | 3 | 0 | 0 | 72 | 20 | +52 | 9 |
| Israel | 3 | 1 | 0 | 2 | 60 | 45 | +15 | 5 |
| Latvia | 3 | 1 | 0 | 2 | 45 | 70 | -25 | 5 |
| Hungary | 3 | 1 | 0 | 2 | 43 | 85 | -42 | 5 |

10 July 2021
11:28

| Belgium | 15–5 | Latvia |

10 July 2021
11:50

| Israel | 7–26 | Hungary |

10 July 2021
15:58

| Belgium | 38–5 | Hungary |

10 July 2021
16:20

| Israel | 43–0 | Latvia |

10 July 2021
17:28

| Belgium | 19–10 | Israel |

10 July 2021
17:42

| Hungary | 12–40 | Latvia |

=== Knockout stage ===
==== 9th Place ====
Semi-finals
11 June 2021 – 13:00
Luxembourg | 48
Turkey | 0
11 June 2021 – 13:22
Hungary | 24
Croatia | 7

Ninth place
11 June 2021 – 16:22
Luxembourg | 7
Hungary | 28
Eleventh place
11 June 2021 – 16:00
Turkey | 5
Croatia | 36

==== 5th Place ====
Semi-finals
11 June 2021 – 14:06
Latvia | 14
Israel | 12
11 June 2021 – 14:28
Denmark | 19
Romania | 24

Fifth place
11 June 2021 – 17:06
Latvia | 12
Romania | 19
Seventh place
11 June 2021 – 16:44
Israel | 20
Denmark | 5

==== Cup ====
Quarter-finals
11 June 2021 – 11:00
Czech Republic | 26
Latvia | 0
11 June 2021 – 12:06
Sweden | 17
Israel | 12
11 June 2021 – 11:22
Ukraine | 27
Denmark | 7
11 June 2021 – 11:44
Belgium | 41
Romania | 0

Semi-finals
11 June 2021 – 15:00
Czech Republic | 24
Sweden | 0
11 June 2021 – 15:22
Ukraine | 12
Belgium | 26

Final
11 June 2021 – 18:30
Czech Republic | 12
Belgium | 22
Third place
11 June 2021 – 17:30
Sweden | 12
Ukraine | 19
