= Kosovo Rugby Federation =

Federata e Ragbit të Kosovës Kosovska Ragbi Federacija
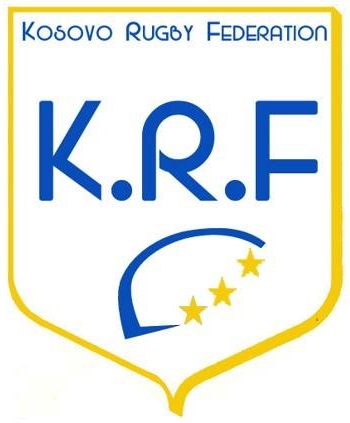
- Sport: Rugby union
- Founded: 2018
- Rugby Europe affiliation: 2021
- President: Dardan Gashi
- Men's coach: Mark Barrett

The Kosovo Rugby Federation (KRF), (Albanian: Federata e Ragbit të Kosovës, Serbian: Kosovska Ragbi Federacija), is the governing body for rugby union in Kosovo. The KRF is a member of Rugby Europe.

== History ==
The Kosovo Rugby Federation was founded in 2018 and became a member of Rugby Europe on 3 December 2021. The first chairman of the KRF was Ruari O’Connell, who was the United Kingdom ambassador to Kosovo at that time. The current chairman is Ndrec Musolli who is also a player for the Kosovo national rugby sevens team. The first club rugby competition in Kosovo was held in 2019. Kosovo made its debut in an international rugby event at the 2022 Rugby Europe Sevens Conference 2 tournament held on 11 and 12 June 2022 in Malta.

== National rugby teams of Kosovo ==
=== Men ===
- Kosovo - the national men's rugby union team.
- Kosovo 7s - the national men's rugby union seven-a-side team.
- Kosovo Under 16 - the national men's under 16 rugby union team

== Rugby clubs in Kosovo ==
=== Men's ===
Men's rugby clubs in Kosovo include:

- Kosovo Roosters
- Peja Eagles
- Prishtina Bears RFC

In addition, the following club from North Macedonia has played in Kosovo domestic rugby competitions:

- Skopje Wild Boars

=== Women's ===
Women's rugby clubs in Kosovo include:

- Balkan Lynx
- R.K. Qikat

== See also ==
- Sport in Kosovo
- Membership of Kosovo in international sports federations
