= 2019 Rugby Europe Sevens Olympic Qualifying Tournament =

- Hosts: France
- Date: 13–14 July
- Nations: 12

Final positions
- Champions: England (for Great Britain)
- Runners-up: France
- Third: Ireland

Series details
- Matches played: 34

The 2019 Rugby Europe Sevens Olympic Qualifying Tournament was held on 13–14 July in Colomiers at Stade Michel Bendichou. The champion of the tournament, England, qualified on behalf of Great Britain for the European spot in the 2020 Summer Olympics. The two runners-up, France and Ireland, advance to the 2020 Olympic repechage tournament.

== Teams ==
Twelve teams take part in the tournament, of which nine teams qualified through the 2019 Moscow Sevens, and are seeded according to their placements. The remaining three spots were awarded based upon performance in the Trophy and Conference tournaments.

Seedings

1. France (Moscow winner)
2. Ireland (Moscow runner-up)
3. England (Moscow 3rd; for Great Britain) (Note: By agreement between the three unions on the island of Great Britain (England, Scotland, Wales), England, as highest finisher among those nations in the 2017–18 World Rugby Sevens Series, represented Great Britain in qualifying for the 2020 Olympic Sevens. The final make-up of the Great Britain men's team was determined by the British Olympic Association.)
4. Germany (Moscow 4th)
5. Spain (Moscow 6th)
6. Portugal (Moscow 7th)
7. Italy (Moscow 8th)
8. Russia (Moscow 9th)
9. Georgia (Moscow 10th)
10. Lithuania (Trophy winner)
11. Ukraine (Trophy runner-up)
12. Hungary (Conference winner)

== Pool stage ==
All times in Central European Summer Time (UTC+02:00)

=== Pool A ===
Team	Pld	W	D	L	PF	PA	PD	Pts
France	3	3	0	0	86	15	+71	9
Italy	3	2	0	1	63	46	+17	7
Portugal	3	1	0	2	64	29	+35	5
Hungary	3	0	0	3	0	123	–123	3

13 July 2019
13:28

Portugal	12–19	Italy

Stade Michel Bendichou, Colomiers
Referee: Jérémy Rozier (France)

13 July 2019
13:50

France	42–0	Hungary

Stade Michel Bendichou, Colomiers
Referee: Iñigo Atorrasagasti (Spain)

13 July 2019
16:13

Portugal	47–0	Hungary

Stade Michel Bendichou, Colomiers
Referee: Richard Haughton (England)

13 July 2019
16:35

France	34–10	Italy

Stade Michel Bendichou, Colomiers
Referee: Sam Grove-White (Scotland)

13 July 2019
18:58

Italy	34–0	Hungary

Stade Michel Bendichou, Colomiers
Referee: Paulo Duarte (Portugal)

13 July 2019
19:20

France	10–5	Portugal

Stade Michel Bendichou, Colomiers
Referee: Craig Evans (Wales)

=== Pool B ===
Team	Pld	W	D	L	PF	PA	PD	Pts
Spain	3	2	1	0	104	22	+82	8
Ireland	3	2	1	0	110	31	+79	8
Russia	3	1	0	2	54	106	–52	5
Ukraine	3	0	0	3	12	121	–109	3

13 July 2019
12:44

Ireland	41–0	Ukraine

Stade Michel Bendichou, Colomiers
Referee: Craig Evans (Wales)

13 July 2019
13:06

Spain	47–0	Russia

Stade Michel Bendichou, Colomiers
Referee: Richard Haughton (England)

13 July 2019
15:29

Ireland	52–14	Russia

Stade Michel Bendichou, Colomiers
Referee: Paulo Duarte (Portugal)

13 July 2019
15:51

Spain	40–5	Ukraine

Stade Michel Bendichou, Colomiers
Referee: Jérémy Rozier (France)

13 July 2019
18:14

Russia	40–7	Ukraine

Stade Michel Bendichou, Colomiers
Referee: Iñigo Atorrasagasti (Spain)

13 July 2019
18:36

Ireland	17–17	Spain

Stade Michel Bendichou, Colomiers
Referee: Sam Grove-White (Scotland)

=== Pool C ===
Team	Pld	W	D	L	PF	PA	PD	Pts
England	3	3	0	0	97	14	+83	9
Germany	3	2	0	1	64	59	+5	7
Georgia	3	1	0	2	52	57	–5	5
Lithuania	3	0	0	3	19	102	–83	3

13 July 2019
11:56

England	40–0	Lithuania

Stade Michel Bendichou, Colomiers
Referee: Paulo Duarte (Portugal)

13 July 2019
12:22

Germany	33–7	Georgia

Stade Michel Bendichou, Colomiers
Referee: Sam Grove-White (Scotland)

13 July 2019
14:45

England	24–7	Georgia

Stade Michel Bendichou, Colomiers
Referee: Iñigo Atorrasagasti (Spain)

13 July 2019
15:07

Germany	24–19	Lithuania

Stade Michel Bendichou, Colomiers
Referee: Craig Evans (Wales)

13 July 2019
17:30

Georgia	38–0	Lithuania

Stade Michel Bendichou, Colomiers
Referee: Richard Haughton (England)

13 July 2019
17:52

England	33–7	Germany

Stade Michel Bendichou, Colomiers
Referee: Jérémy Rozier (France)

== Knockout stage ==
=== Cup ===
Quarter-finals
14 July – 11:00 – Stade Michel Bendichou
France	28
Georgia	0
14 July – 12:06 – Stade Michel Bendichou
Ireland	21
Germany	0
14 July – 11:22 – Stade Michel Bendichou
Spain	5
Portugal	14
14 July – 11:44 – Stade Michel Bendichou
England	35
Italy	0

Semi-finals
14 July – 14:59 – Stade Michel Bendichou
France	19
Ireland	12
14 July – 15:21 – Stade Michel Bendichou
Portugal	12
England	29

Final
14 July – 18:11 – Stade Michel Bendichou
France	7
England	31
Third place
14 July – 17:46 – Stade Michel Bendichou
Ireland	26
Portugal	12

=== Plate ===
Semi-finals
14 July – 14:15 – Stade Michel Bendichou
Georgia	0
Germany	19
14 July – 14:37 – Stade Michel Bendichou
Spain	47
Italy	7

Plate final
14 July – 17:24 – Stade Michel Bendichou
Germany	19
Spain	21
Seventh place
14 July – 17:02 – Stade Michel Bendichou
Georgia	19
Italy	21

=== Bowl ===
Semi-finals
14 July – 12:28 – Stade Michel Bendichou
Russia	31
Hungary	5
14 July – 12:50 – Stade Michel Bendichou
Lithuania	14
Ukraine	0

Bowl final
14 July – 16:05 – Stade Michel Bendichou
Russia	29
Lithuania	24
Eleventh place
14 July – 15:43 – Stade Michel Bendichou
Hungary	12
Ukraine	29

== Standings ==
Legend
Green fill	Qualified for the Rugby seven's tournament at the 2020 Summer Olympics
Blue fill	Qualified for the Final Olympic Qualification Repechage competition

Rank	Team
1st place, gold medalist(s)	England
2nd place, silver medalist(s)	France
3rd place, bronze medalist(s)	Ireland
4	Portugal
5	Spain
6	Germany
7	Italy
8	Georgia
9	Russia
10	Lithuania
11	Ukraine
12	Hungary
