= Kosovo national rugby sevens team =

Kosovo
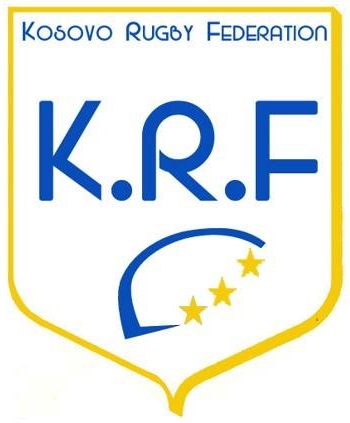
- Union: Kosovo Rugby Federation
- Nickname: Dardanët (Dardanians)
- Coach: Mark Barrett
- Captain: Mehdi Krasniqi

First international
- Slovenia 22–5 Kosovo (11 June 2022)

Largest win
- Kosovo 38–0 Estonia (12 June 2022)

Largest defeat
- Kosovo 0–88 Albania (15 March 2025)

The Kosovo national rugby sevens team is the national rugby sevens side representing Kosovo.

== History ==
The Kosovo Rugby Federation was established in September 2018. A great role in its establishment has played the Rugby Community in Kosovo. Rugby community consists of people that come with different cultural backgrounds coming from different continents of the world. On 3 December 2021, Kosovo was accepted in Rugby Europe during their 103rd meeting.

== Competitive record ==
=== Rugby Europe Sevens ===
On 8 April 2022, it was decided that Kosovo should be part of Rugby Europe Sevens in Conference 2 of the 2022 Rugby Europe Sevens Conference, together with Estonia, Malta, San Marino, Slovakia and Slovenia. On 11 June 2022, Kosovo made their debut in the Rugby Europe Sevens Conference with a 22–5 away defeat against Slovenia, which match was also the team's first-ever match. A day later, Kosovo achieved their first win in the Rugby Europe Sevens Conference, which was also the team's first-ever win, a 38–0 home win against Estonia. Kosovo is set to participate in the 2023 Conference 2 between 17 and 18 June 2023 in Bar, Montenegro.

Rugby Europe Sevens
Year	Division	Pos	Pld	W	D	L	P/R
before 2022	Team did not exist						
(Malta) 2022	Conf. 2	5th	5	1	0	4	Same position
(Montenegro) 2023	Conf. 2						
Total			5	1	0	4	—

== Fixtures and results ==
=== 2022 ===
11 June	Slovenia	22–5	Kosovo	Hibernians Stadium, Paola, Malta
10:00		Report

11 June	Slovakia	22–12	Kosovo	Hibernians Stadium, Paola, Malta
16:44		Report

11 June	Kosovo	0–48	Malta	Hibernians Stadium, Paola, Malta
19:14		Report

12 June	San Marino	30–0	Kosovo	Hibernians Stadium, Paola, Malta
14:44		Report

12 June	Kosovo	38–0	Estonia	Hibernians Stadium, Paola, Malta
17:14		Report

== Players ==
=== Current squad ===
- The following players have been called up for the 2022 Rugby Europe Sevens Conference.
- The club listed is the club for which the player last played a competitive match prior to the call-up.

No.	Player	Club
1	Ramadan Elshani	(Kosovo) Bears
2	Ndrec Musolli	(Kosovo) Bears
3	Ardian Beqiri	(Switzerland) Winterthur
4	Mehdi Krasniqi	(France) Épernay Champagne
5	Kushtrim Dragusha	(Kosovo) Bears
6	Mirsad Idrizi	(Kosovo) Bears
7	Fatmir Ismajli	(Kosovo) Bears
8	Korab Sefaj	(Kosovo) Peja Eagles
9	Elton Rexhepi	(Kosovo) Bears
10	Fatos Ibrahimi	(Kosovo) Bears
11	Dardan Gashi	(Kosovo) Peja Eagles
12	Ardit Koci	(Kosovo) Bears

== Head-to-head record ==
As of 12 June 2022

Opponent	Pld	W	D	L	Win %
Estonia	1	1	0	0	100.00
Malta	1	0	0	1	0.00
San Marino	1	0	0	1	0.00
Slovakia	1	0	0	1	0.00
Slovenia	1	0	0	1	0.00
5 countries	5	1	0	4	20.00

== See also ==
- Kosovo national rugby union team
