= Rugby union in Monaco =

- Country: Monaco
- Governing body: FMR
- National team: Monaco
- First played: 1996
- Registered players: 325
- Clubs: 2

Rugby union in Monaco is a minor, but growing sport. In October 2017, Monaco ranked 107th out of 110th national teams according to the World Rugby.

The governing body of rugby union in Monaco is the Fédération Monégasque de Rugby (FMR).

== History ==
Rugby union has a long history in Monaco. The country is not far from Menton, which is where William Webb Ellis, the supposed founder of the game is buried.

== See also ==
- Monaco national rugby union team
