= Monegasque Rugby Federation =

Sports governing body in Monaco

Fédération Monégasque de Rugby
- Sport: Rugby union
- Founded: 1996; 30 years ago
- World Rugby affiliation: 1998
- Rugby Europe affiliation: 1996
- President: Charlene, Princess of Monaco
- Men's coach: Nicolas Bonnet
- Women's coach: Fabien Camin
- Website: www.monaco-rugby.com

Monegasque Rugby Federation (French: Fédération Monégasque de Rugby) is the governing body for the sport of rugby union in Monaco. The union was established in 1996.

== History ==
Before the founding of the Monegasque Rugby Federation, rugby in Monaco was predominantly represented by the AS Monaco Rugby (founded 1964) which played in the French rugby union system. In 1987, the Tournoi de Rugby à 7 de Monte-Carlo (transl. Monte Carlo Rugby sevens Tournament) was officially created. In 1996, after the AS Monaco was invited to join the rugby unions of Switzerland, Andorra and Luxembourg, the Monegasque Rugby Federation was founded, and joined the International Rugby Board in 1998.

Since 2009, the Monegasque Rugby Federation has hosted the Sainte Dévote Tournament annually for international under-12 teams, which also include an annual match between Monaco and Lucciana, Corsica.

In 2017, Charlene, Princess of Monaco and the Monegasque Rugby Federation founded the Monaco Impis rugby sevens team, a team representing Monaco but composed of other international players. In 2023, the Princess Charlene of Monaco Foundation organised an exchange programme between the Monagasque Rugby Federation and South Africa, allowing Monegasque teams to enter South African rugby tournaments. In 2024 at the Dubai Sevens, the Monegasque Rugby Federation sent three teams with Monaco Impis Development and Monaco Under-16s. The Monaco Impis won the tournament. As a result of her support for Monagasque rugby, Princess Charlene was appointed as president of the Monegasque Rugby Federation.

== See also ==
- Rugby union in Monaco
- Monaco national rugby union team
