= Turkey national rugby sevens team =

Turkey
- Union: Turkish Rugby Federation
Team kit	Change kit

The Turkey national rugby sevens team is a sporting side that represents Turkey in Rugby sevens. They compete annually in the Rugby Europe Sevens competition.

== Competitive record ==
=== Rugby Europe Sevens ===
- 2012 European Nations Cup Division 3
- 2013 European Sevens Division B South
- 2014 European Sevens Division B South
- 2015 Rugby Europe Sevens – Lower Divisions
- 2016 Rugby Europe Sevens Conferences
- 2017 Rugby Europe Sevens Conferences
- 2018 Rugby Europe Sevens Conferences
- 2019 Rugby Europe Sevens Conference
- 2021 Rugby Europe Sevens Trophy
- 2022 Rugby Europe Sevens Conference
- 2023 Rugby Europe Sevens Conference
- 2024 Rugby Europe Sevens Conference

== Results ==
=== 2021 ===
2021 Rugby Europe Sevens Trophy

1. Turkey 0 - 38 Ukraine
2. Turkey 5 - 52 Czech Republic
3. Turkey 0 - 34 Luxembourg
4. Turkey 7 - 12 Latvia
5. Turkey 19 - 24 Bulgaria
6. Turkey 5 - 64 Ukraine
7. Turkey 5 - 15 Sweden
8. Turkey 5 - 29 Luxembourg
9. Turkey 0 - 48 Luxembourg
10. Turkey 5 - 36 Croatia

=== 2022 ===
2022 Rugby Europe Sevens Conference

=== 2023 ===
1. Turkey 31 - 12 Finland
2. Turkey 41 - 0 Serbia
3. Turkey 49 - 12 Bosnia and Herzegovina
4. Turkey 21 - 19 Norway
5. Turkey 28 - 12 Norway
6. Turkey 14 - 12 Monaco

=== 2024 ===
1. Turkey 10 - 17 Czech Republic
2. Turkey 21 - 22 Hungary
3. Turkey 28 - 24 Netherlands
4. Turkey 19 - 21 Sweden
5. Turkey 17 - 31 Switzerland
6. Turkey 14 - 17 Hungary

== See also ==
- Rugby union in Turkey
- Turkey national rugby union team
