= Malta national rugby sevens team =

Malta
- Union: Malta Rugby Football Union
Team kit

The Malta national men's rugby sevens team competes in the FIRA European Sevens circuit.

They were Rugby Europe Conference 2 champions in 2016. They topped the table beating Montenegro, Estonia and Belarus.

== History ==
Malta hosted the Rugby Europe Conference 2 finals in 2022.

On 13 May 2023 they took part in the Jed-Forest Sevens in Scotland. A spokesman said:

The Malta Rugby Football Union thanks Jed-Forest RFC for the opportunity to take part in one of the most prestigious rugby sevens tournaments in Scotland. It will be our pleasure and honour to line up alongside some of the best club sides in Scotland such as the oldest rugby club Edinburgh Accies and others. The tournament is a perfect lead up to Malta’s preparation for the Games of the Small States of Europe (GSSE) which will take place later this month – we look forward to a stellar rugby Saturday at Jed-Forest.

The Malta national sevens side was beaten in Round 1 by Hawick RFC. Hawick won the match 20-14.

They are in Pool C of Conference 1 in 2023, along with Austria and Norway.
