= Hungary national rugby sevens team =

Hungary
- Union: Hungarian Rugby Union
Team kit

The Hungary national rugby sevens team competes in the FIRA European Sevens circuit. They first took part in a qualifying tournament for the 1997 Rugby World Cup Sevens in Lisbon in 1996. Playing four matches, they lost all four, including 0-89 and 0-80 scores against New Zealand and Ireland respectively.

== Results ==
=== 2008 ===
Rugby Sevens – Hungarian internationals in 2008
Date	Location	Opposition	Result	Tournament
24–25 May	Sopot	Ireland	0-40	2008 Sopot Sevens
24–25 May	Sopot	Sweden	0-28	2008 Sopot Sevens
24–25 May	Sopot	Lithuania	7-33	2008 Sopot Sevens
24–25 May	Sopot	Denmark	7-12	2008 Sopot Sevens
24–25 May	Sopot	Norway	**33-12**	2008 Sopot Sevens
31 May - 1 June	Zagreb	Austria	**38-14**	2008 Zagreb Sevens
31 May - 1 June	Zagreb	Serbia	10-35	2008 Zagreb Sevens
31 May - 1 June	Zagreb	Germany	7-54	2008 Zagreb Sevens
31 May - 1 June	Zagreb	Italy	0-47	2008 Zagreb Sevens
31 May - 1 June	Zagreb	Croatia	7-28	2008 Zagreb Sevens
31 May - 1 June	Zagreb	Bosnia and Herzegovina	5-7	2008 Zagreb Sevens

=== 2009 ===
Rugby Sevens – Hungarian internationals in 2009
Date	Location	Opposition	Result	Tournament
16–17 May	Sopot	Portugal	0-82	2009 Sopot Sevens
16–17 May	Sopot	Sweden	5-35	2009 Sopot Sevens
16–17 May	Sopot	Latvia	0-17	2009 Sopot Sevens
16–17 May	Sopot	Luxembourg	5-17	2009 Sopot Sevens
16–17 May	Sopot	Norway	0-19	2009 Sopot Sevens
30–31 May	Split	France	0-84	2009 Split Sevens
30–31 May	Split	Germany	0-47	2009 Split Sevens
30–31 May	Split	Bosnia and Herzegovina	12-24	2009 Split Sevens
30–31 May	Split	Serbia	**19-0**	2009 Split Sevens
30–31 May	Split	Cyprus	0-80	2009 Split Sevens
30–31 May	Split	Bosnia and Herzegovina	0-28	2009 Split Sevens

- Hungarian wins in **bold**.
