= Sweden national rugby sevens team =

Swedish men's minor national sevens rugby team

The Sweden national rugby sevens team is a minor national sevens side. Sweden won the 2017 Rugby Europe Sevens Trophy to qualify for the 2018 Grand Prix Sevens.

Sweden competed in the qualifying rounds of the 1993 Rugby World Cup Sevens in Catania, Sicily where they lost to Taiwan and failed to qualify.

Quarter-finals
31 May 1992 - Catania, Sicily
Namibia	won
Zimbabwe	lost
31 May 1992 - Catania, Sicily
Taiwan	won
Sweden	lost
31 May 1992 - Catania, Sicily
Hong Kong	won
Czech Republic	lost
31 May 1992 - Catania, Sicily
Spain	won
Portugal	lost

Semi-finals
31 May 1992 - Catania, Sicily
Namibia	won
Taiwan	lost
31 May 1992 - Catania, Sicily
Hong Kong	won
Spain	lost

Final
31 May 1992 - Catania, Sicily
Namibia	26
Hong Kong	10

== See also ==
- Sweden national rugby union team
- Rugby union in Sweden
