= Monaco national rugby union team =

National rugby union team

Monaco
- Union: Monegasque Rugby Federation
- Head coach: Nicolas Bonnet, Thierry Danthez, Vincent Romulus
First colours

World Rugby ranking
- Current: 110 (as of 4 November 2024)
- Highest: 109 (2024)
- Lowest: 110 (2024)

First international
- Monaco 8–8 Luxembourg (Saint-Laurent-du-Var, France; 1 July 1996)

Biggest win
- Monaco 90–0 Finland (Saint-Laurent-du-Var, France; 19 October 2002)

Biggest defeat
- Bosnia-Herzegovina 50–5 Monaco (Menton, France; 11 October 2008)

Monaco national rugby union team has been playing since the 1990s. They currently only play friendly games and do not compete in the European Nations Cup, but they are still member of World Rugby. In October 2019, Monaco ranked 101st out of 105 national teams according to World Rugby.

== History ==
Monaco made their international debut in July 1996, in a match against Luxembourg, which ended in an 8-all draw. The next match played by Monaco was in April of the following year, when they also recorded their first win, defeating Slovenia 23-17. Monaco then played a number of games in the late 1990s, and then won three games in 2002. However, in 2006, they defeated Slovakia 6 points to nil. Monaco competed in the European qualifying tournament for the 2003 Rugby World Cup.

== Record ==
=== World Cup ===
| World Cup record | | | | | | | | World Cup Qualification record | | | | | |
| Year | Round | P | W | D | L | F | A | P | W | D | L | F | A |
|---|---|---|---|---|---|---|---|---|---|---|---|---|---|
| (Australia) (New Zealand) 1987 | No invitation | | | | | | | No qualifying tournament held | | | | | |
| (United Kingdom) (Ireland) (France) 1991 | Did not enter | | | | | | | Did not enter | | | | | |
| (South Africa) 1995 | Did not enter | | | | | | | Did not enter | | | | | |
| (Wales) 1999 | Did not enter | | | | | | | Did not enter | | | | | |
| (Australia) 2003 | Did not qualify | | | | | | | 5 | 1 | 0 | 4 | 54 | 84 |
| (France) 2007 | Did not enter | | | | | | | Did not enter | | | | | |
| (New Zealand) 2011 | Did not enter | | | | | | | Did not enter | | | | | |
| (England) 2015 | Did not enter | | | | | | | Did not enter | | | | | |
| (Japan) 2019 | Did not enter | | | | | | | Did not enter | | | | | |
| (France) 2023 | Did not enter | | | | | | | Did not enter | | | | | |
| Total | 0/10 | 0 | 0 | 0 | 0 | 0 | 0 | 5 | 1 | 0 | 4 | 54 | 84 |

=== Overall ===
Below is a table of the representative rugby matches played by a Monaco national XV at test level up until 14 November 2009, updated after match with Cyprus.

| Opponent | Played | Won | Lost | Drawn | % Won |
|---|---|---|---|---|---|
| Andorra | 2 | 0 | 2 | 0 | 0% |
| Austria | 1 | 0 | 1 | 0 | 0% |
| Azerbaijan | 2 | 2 | 0 | 0 | 100% |
| Belgium | 1 | 0 | 1 | 0 | 0% |
| Bosnia and Herzegovina | 3 | 1 | 2 | 0 | 33.33% |
| Bulgaria | 4 | 4 | 0 | 0 | 100% |
| Cyprus | 3 | 0 | 3 | 0 | 0% |
| Finland | 1 | 1 | 0 | 0 | 100% |
| Greece | 1 | 0 | 1 | 0 | 0% |
| Hungary | 1 | 1 | 0 | 0 | 100% |
| Israel | 1 | 0 | 1 | 0 | 0% |
| Lithuania | 1 | 0 | 1 | 0 | 0% |
| Luxembourg | 2 | 0 | 1 | 1 | 0% |
| Malta | 2 | 1 | 1 | 0 | 50% |
| Moldova | 1 | 0 | 1 | 0 | 0% |
| Norway | 1 | 1 | 0 | 0 | 100% |
| Slovakia | 1 | 0 | 1 | 0 | 0% |
| Slovenia | 4 | 2 | 2 | 0 | 50% |
| Switzerland | 1 | 0 | 1 | 0 | 0% |
| Total | 33 | 13 | 20 | 1 | 39.39% |

== See also ==
- Fédération Monégasque de Rugby
- Rugby union in Monaco
