= Serbia national rugby sevens team =

Serbia
- Union: Rugby Union of Serbia
Team kit

The Serbia national rugby sevens team is controlled by Serbian rugby federation. In 2015 Serbia won second place in the European Championship B division and is qualified to compete in 2016 in A division of European Series. For the 2022 season, the team played in the Rugby Europe Sevens Conference 1.

== Current squad ==
Serbian current squad for the 2015 European Championship - B division:

- Igor Dejanović
- Andrija Janković
- Andrej Banduka
- Danijel Kajan
- Vitor Ljubičić
- Aleksandar Nedeljković
- Istok Totić
- Marko Knežević
- Marko Isailović
- Uroš Babić
- Miladin Živanov
- Milan Marinković
