= Montenegro national rugby sevens team =

- Union: Montenegrin Rugby Union
- Nickname: "Wolves" (Vukovi)
- Coach: (Montenegro) Miodrag "Bato" Jović
- Captain: (Montenegro) Boris Mijusković
1st kit	2nd kit	3rd kit

Official website
- mnerugby.me

The Montenegro national rugby sevens team, known as the Wolves (Vukovi) plays in red and gold jerseys with red shorts, and their emblem is the double headed eagle while their logo is the wolf. Montenegro are currently in Conference 2 in Europe for rugby 7s having made their debut in 2014.

== History ==
Prior to 2003, Montenegro had been represented in international rugby matches as FR Yugoslavia, and as Serbia and Montenegro from 2003 until Montenegro's independence in 2006. Rugby began to develop in Montenegro from 2011. Participation numbers grew and the players progressed to rugby sevens. By 2013 there were four rugby clubs in Montenegro. A regional league began in 2014 and fixtures were also arranged with other teams around the former Yugoslavian countries, and by 2014 there were seven clubs. Rugby has competition from other popular sports such as water-polo, soccer, handball and mixed martial arts in Montenegro. Due to the small population of the country, rugby 7s is popular due to the game requiring fewer players. An official international 7s squad was named and sent to Greece for the ENC Division B competition in 2014. This is the start of Montenegro rugby on the international stage.

== Results ==
The national sevens team made its international debut in Greece in 2014. The first international was played against the favorites Switzerland with the game ending final score 15–36 to Switzerland. The team progressed to the Bowl play-offs and defeated San Marino by 45–7 and Liechtenstein by 38–5 in the final to win the 2014 ENC Division B Bowl. After the reformatting of the sevens system by rugby Europe the national team place in a new conference system (conference 2) in a group with favourites Malta, Estonia and Belarus. The national team made good progress and finished in the final (a first final for sevens rugby) of that tournament losing out to Malta in the final but securing promotion to conference 1 The team competing in the 2017 tournament in Bulgaria had a poor set of results and just lost the few important matches in their battle to stay up in the conference.

== Current squad ==
Note: Flags indicate national union as has been defined under World Rugby eligibility rules. Players may hold more than one nationality. Rugby clubs are in brackets.

- 01 (Montenegro) Djordje "Djole" Marstjepović - (RK Mornar Bar)
- 02 (Montenegro) Milan "Radar" Radović - (RK Nikšić)
- 03 (Montenegro) Srdjan "Popi" Popović - (RK Arsenal Tivat)
- 04 (Montenegro) Novica "Roka" Raonić - (RK Nikšić)
- 05 (Montenegro) Boris Mijusković (C) - (RK Nikšić)
- 06 (Montenegro) Dušan "Dule" Vučićević - (RK Mornar Bar)
- 07 (Montenegro) Aleksandar "Sayo" Roganović - (RK Nikšić)
- 08 (Montenegro) Vladan "Cebi" Celebić - (RK Podgorica)
- 09 (Montenegro) Aljosa Marinkovic - (RK Arsenal Tivat)
- 10 (Montenegro) Marko Andrić - (RK Podgorica)
- 11 (Montenegro) Marko Novaković - (RK Podgorica)
- 12 (Montenegro) Aleksandar "Zikica" Milosavljević - (RK Podgorica)

Coach: (Montenegro) Miodrag "Bato" Jović

Team manager: (Montenegro) Zorica Kostić

== See also ==
- Montenegro national rugby union team
- Rugby union in Montenegro
- Montenegrin Rugby Union
