= Moldova men's national rugby sevens team =

The Moldova national rugby sevens team is a minor national sevens side. Moldova finished third at the 2007 European Sevens Championship. For the 2022 season, the team played in the Rugby Europe Sevens Conference 1.

== See also ==
- Moldova national rugby union team
- Moldovan Rugby Federation
