= Andorra national rugby sevens team =

National rugby team of Andorra

Andorra
- Union: Federació Andorrana de Rugby
- Nickname: Els Isards
- Coach: Josep Marticella
- Captain: Jonathan Garcia
Team kit

First international
- Andorra 0 – 74 Romania (1 June 1996)

Largest win
- Andorra 68 – 0 Norway (9 June 2006)

Largest defeat
- Andorra 0 – 74 Romania (1 June 1996)

World Cup
- Appearances: 0

The Andorra national rugby sevens team is the official Andorra representative in international competitions of Rugby sevens. The team has played in fourteen International Sevens Tournaments (WC Qualifier 1996 (1 round), WC Qualifier 2000 (1 round), FIRA-AER 2003 Qualifiers (1 round), FIRA-AER 2004 Qualifiers (2 rounds), FIRA-AER 2005 Qualifiers (2 rounds), FIRA-AER 2006 Qualifiers (2 rounds) and Finals, FIRA-AER 2007 Qualifiers (2 rounds) and Finals, FIRA-AER 2008 Qualifiers). In FIRA-AER, each year a number of tournaments take place across Europe and each nation takes part in two tournaments to decide on a final 12. In 2007, Andorra were joint 12th with Croatia but qualified on a points difference. The FIRA-AER qualifiers have seen placings of 5th (5 times), 4th (1 time) and 3rd (2 times). Both appearances in the finals have seen 12th (last) but notable teams have failed to qualify.

== Tournament history ==
=== Rugby World Cup Sevens ===
Andorra did not qualify for the 1997 and 2001 Rugby World Cup Sevens.

=== Rugby Europe Sevens ===
FIRA-AER Qualifiers
Year	Position
(Spain) 2003	5th
(France) 2004	5th
(Georgia (country)) 2004	8th
(France) 2005	5th
(Andorra) 2005	5th
(Netherlands) 2006	3rd
(Spain) 2006	3rd
(Netherlands) 2007	4th
(Croatia) 2007	5th
(Greece) 2008	4th
FIRA-AER Finals
(Russia) 2006	12th
(Russia) 2007	12th

== See also ==
- Andorra national rugby union team

== Sources ==
- IRB
- FIRA-AER
- Scrum.com
- Rugbyinternational.net
