= Croatia national rugby sevens team =

Croatia
- Union: Croatian Rugby Federation
Team kit

World Cup Sevens
- Appearances: 0

The Croatia national rugby sevens team is a minor national sevens side. They compete annually in the Rugby Europe sevens championship.

== Rugby Europe Sevens ==
Croatia won the 2016 Rugby Europe Sevens Conferences and were promoted to the Rugby Europe Sevens Trophy for 2017.
