= Switzerland national rugby sevens team =

The Switzerland national rugby sevens team is a minor national sevens side. It competes annually in the Rugby Europe sevens championship. For the 2022 season, the team played in the Rugby Europe Sevens Conference 1.

== See also ==
- Switzerland national rugby union team
- Swiss Rugby Federation
