= Norway national rugby sevens team =

The Norway national rugby sevens team is a minor national sevens side. It competes annually in the Rugby Europe sevens competition. For the 2022 season, the team played in the Rugby Europe Sevens Conference 1.

In 2024 under new Head Coach Owen Jones, the team won the Rugby Europe Conference 1 tournament and got promoted to "Trophy" level, competing against the likes of Romania. After a successful campaign in Trophy 2025, Norway secured their spot in the competition for 2026 with Luxembourg getting demoted.
