= 2022 Rugby World Cup Sevens qualifying – Men =

This was the qualifying process for the 2022 Rugby World Cup Sevens with the aim of selecting the men's national rugby sevens teams that would compete in the tournament in Cape Town, South Africa. A total of 59 nations took part in the qualifying process.

== General ==
The tournament was organized by World Rugby and held from 9 to 11 September 2022, with twenty-four teams competing. South Africa automatically qualified as hosts as well as the eight quarter-finalists of the 2018 Rugby World Cup Sevens. The other 16 teams qualified through their respective regional tournaments.

== Qualified teams ==
Africa	North America	South America	Asia	Europe	Oceania
Automatic qualification
South Africa	United States	Argentina		England; France; Scotland	Australia; Fiji; New Zealand
Regional Qualifiers
Uganda; Zimbabwe; Kenya	Canada; Jamaica	Chile; Uruguay	Hong Kong; South Korea	Germany; Ireland; Portugal; Wales	Australia; Samoa; Tonga

== Qualifying ==
Legend
Qualified to 2022 Rugby World Cup Sevens

=== Africa ===
14 teams competed in the Rugby Africa's Sevens tournament on 23–24 April 2022 in Kampala, Uganda contesting for the three qualifying spots. Uganda, Zimbabwe, and Kenya qualified for the World Cup.

Pos	Team
1	Uganda
2	Zimbabwe
3	Kenya
4	Zambia
5	Madagascar
6	Tunisia
7	Burkina Faso
8	Namibia
9	Ghana
10	Mauritius
11	Senegal
12	Botswana
13	Cameroon
14	Burundi

=== North America ===
13 teams competed in the RAN Sevens Qualifiers on 23–24 April 2022 in Nassau, Bahamas contesting for the two qualifying spots, Canada and Jamaica were the two teams to qualify.

Pos	Team
1	Canada
2	Jamaica
3	Mexico
4	Bermuda
5	Barbados
6	Cayman Islands
7	Trinidad and Tobago
8	Curaçao
9	Guyana
10	British Virgin Islands
11	Bahamas
12	Turks and Caicos Islands
13	Belize

=== South America ===
Nine teams competed in the Sudamérica Sevens tournament on 27–28 November 2021 in San José, Costa Rica, Uruguay and Chile were the two teams to book their World Cup spots.

Pos	Team
1	Uruguay
2	Chile
3	Brazil
4	Peru
5	Costa Rica
6	Guatemala
7	Nicaragua
8	El Salvador
9	Panama

=== Asia ===
Eight teams competed for the two qualifying spots on 19–20 November 2021 in Dubai with Hong Kong and South Korea going through.

Pos	Team
1	Hong Kong
2	South Korea
3	Japan
4	China
5	United Arab Emirates
6	Sri Lanka
7	Malaysia
8	Philippines

=== Europe ===
Twelve teams competed in the European Qualifiers for the four available spots on 16–17 July 2022 in Bucharest, Romania. Ireland, Germany, Portugal, and Wales were the teams to qualify; Germany qualified for their first Sevens World Cup.

Seed	Team	Pool	Pld	W	D	L	PF	PA	PD	Pts
1	Ireland (Q)	A	3	3	0	0	123	5	+118	9
2	Spain	B	3	3	0	0	123	22	+101	9
3	Germany (Q)	C	3	3	0	0	90	17	+73	9
4	Wales (Q)	C	3	2	0	1	88	26	+62	7
5	Belgium	B	3	2	0	1	78	29	+49	7
6	Italy	A	3	2	0	1	40	36	+4	7
7	Portugal (Q)	A	3	1	0	2	56	43	+13	5
8	Georgia	C	3	1	0	2	36	66	–30	5
9	Czech Republic	B	3	1	0	2	25	114	–89	5
10	Lithuania	B	3	0	0	3	20	81	–61	3
11	Romania	C	3	0	0	3	7	112	–105	3
12	Poland	A	3	0	0	3	10	145	–135	3

=== Oceania ===
Oceania was unable to hold any qualifying tournament due to the ongoing impacts of COVID-19 in 2021 and 2022. Fiji and New Zealand had qualified automatically as quarterfinalists from the 2018 Sevens World Cup. Australia and Samoa qualified due to finishing 4th and 12th, respectively, in the 2019–20 World Rugby Sevens Series. Tonga was given the final spot by placing 5th in the 2019 Oceania Sevens.
