= 2023 World Rugby Sevens Challenger Series – Men's tour =

Rugby sevens competition

2023 World Rugby Sevens Challenger Series
- Men's tour – Series III
- Hosts: South Africa
- Date: 20–30 April 2023
- Nations: 12

Final positions
- Champions: Tonga
- Runners-up: Belgium
- Third: Germany

The 2023 Challenger Series for men's rugby sevens teams was the third season of the second-tier circuit that allowed a promotion pathway to the World Rugby Sevens Series.

The men's challenger tour had twelve national teams competing and was played as two tournaments on 20–22 and 28–30 April 2023 in Stellenbosch, South Africa, with the winner gaining entry to the 2023 London Sevens core team qualifier.

== Teams ==
There were 12 men's national teams competing in the Challenger Series for 2023.

Date qualified	Means of qualification	Nation
24 April 2022	2022 Africa Men's Sevens	Uganda
24 April 2022	2022 Africa Men's Sevens	Zimbabwe
3 July 2022	2022 Rugby Europe Sevens Series	Germany
3 July 2022	2022 Rugby Europe Sevens Series	Belgium
3 July 2022	2022 Rugby Europe Sevens Series	Italy
14 November 2022	2022 RAN Super Sevens	Jamaica
20 November 2022	2022 Oceania Rugby Sevens Challenge	Tonga
20 November 2022	2022 Oceania Rugby Sevens Challenge	Papua New Guinea
27 November 2022	2022 Asia Rugby Sevens Series	Hong Kong
27 November 2022	2022 Asia Rugby Sevens Series	South Korea
27 November 2022	2022 Sudamérica Rugby Sevens	Chile
27 November 2022	2022 Sudamérica Rugby Sevens	Brazil
Totals	6	12

== Schedule ==
The official schedule for the 2023 World Rugby Sevens Challenger Series was:

2023 Itinerary
Leg	Stadium	City	Dates	Winner
1	Markotter Stadium	Stellenbosch	20–22 April 2023	Tonga
2	Markotter Stadium	Stellenbosch	28–30 April 2023	Belgium

== Standings ==
2023 World Rugby Sevens Challenger Series – Men's Series III
Pos.	Event Team	Leg 1	Leg 2	Points total
1	Tonga	20	18	38
2	Belgium	14	20	34
3	Germany	18	14	32
4	Hong Kong	16	12	28
5	Chile	8	16	24
6	Uganda	12	10	22
7	Italy	10	8	18
8	Brazil	6	4	10
9	Papua New Guinea	3	6	9
10	Zimbabwe	4	2	6
11	South Korea	2	3	5
12	Jamaica	1	1	2

== Pool stage – Leg 1 ==
All times are in SAST, South African Standard Time: (UTC+2).

=== Pool A ===
Pos	Team	Pld	W	D	L	PF	PA	PD	Pts	Qualification
1	Tonga	3	2	1	0	72	38	+34	8	Advance to quarter-finals
2	Germany	3	2	0	1	56	36	+20	7	Advance to quarter-finals
3	Belgium	3	1	1	1	68	54	+14	6	Advance to quarter-finals
4	Zimbabwe	3	0	0	3	35	103	−68	3	

Source: World Rugby

20 April
11:22

Tonga	29–7	Zimbabwe
Try: Atieli Pakalani (2); Sione Tupou; Kyren Taumoefolau; Semisi Maasi; Con: Atieli Pakalani; Semisi Maasi	Report	Try: Martin Mangongo; Con: Tadius Dzandiwandira

Markotter Stadium
Referee: Caua Ricardo Santos

20 April
11:44

Germany	12–7	Belgium
Try: Niklas Koch; Jack Hunt; Con: Niklas Koch	Report	Try: Gaspard Lalli; Con: Isaac Montoisy

Markotter Stadium
Referee: Evan Urruzmendi

20 April
14:19

Tonga	21–21	Belgium
Try: John Tapueluelu; Sione Tupou; Kyren Taumoefolau; Con: Atieli Pakalani; Kyren Taumoefolau (2)	Report	Try: Vincent Hart; Tornike Megrelidze; Nathan Bontems; Con: Vincent Hart (2); Isaac Montoisy

Markotter Stadium
Referee: Robin Kaluzniak

20 April
14:46

Germany	34–7	Zimbabwe
Try: Ben Ellermann; John Dawe; Jack Hunt (2); Philip Gleitze; Nikolai Klewinghaus; Con: Niklas Koch; Nikolai Klewinghaus	Report	Try: Godfrey Magaramombe; Con: Ryan Musumhi

Markotter Stadium
Referee: Peter Martin

21 April
10:38

Zimbabwe	21–40	Belgium
Try: Martin Mangongo; Tadius Dzandiwandira; Carlos Matematema; Con: Ryan Musumhi; Tadius Dzandiwandira (2)	Report	Try: Corentin Lecloux; Martin Marenne; Ryan Godsmark; Gaspard Lalli (2); Jens Torfs; Con: Vincent Hart (5)

Markotter Stadium
Referee: Morgan White

21 April
11:32

Germany	10–22	Tonga
Try: Carlos Soteras Merz; John Dawe	Report	Try: John Tapueluelu; Rodney Tongotea; Laulea Mau; Con: Atieli Pakalani (2); Pen: Atieli Pakalani

Markotter Stadium
Referee: Evan Urruzmendi

=== Pool B ===
Pos	Team	Pld	W	D	L	PF	PA	PD	Pts	Qualification
1	Chile	3	3	0	0	51	38	+13	9	Advance to quarter-finals
2	Hong Kong	3	2	0	1	57	36	+21	7	Advance to quarter-finals
3	Italy	3	1	0	2	62	53	+9	5	Advance to quarter-finals
4	Papua New Guinea	3	0	0	3	36	79	−43	3	

Source: World Rugby

20 April
10:06

Hong Kong	26–5	Papua New Guinea
Try: Max Woodward; Max Denmark; Russell Webb; Pierce Mackinlay-West; Con: Russell Webb (3)	Report	Try: Kunak Late

Markotter Stadium
Referee: Robin Kaluzniak

20 April
10:28

Chile	17–12	Italy
Try: Ernesto Tchimino; Benjamin Videla; Manuel Bustamante; Con: Diego Warnken	Report	Try: Matthias Leon Douglas (2); Con: Francesco Bonavolontà

Markotter Stadium
Referee: Morgan White

20 April
13:10

Hong Kong	24–17	Italy
Try: Michael Coverdale; Hugo Stiles; Max Denmark; Seb Brien; Con: Russell Webb (2)	Report	Try: Massimo Cioffi; Cristian Lai; Nicolò Teneggi; Con: Nicolò Teneggi

Markotter Stadium
Referee: Tevita Vosalevu

20 April
13:32

Chile	20–19	Papua New Guinea
Try: Diego Warnken; Cristobal Game; Manuel Bustamante (2)	Report	Try: Kunak Late; Mustapha Kura; Kadum Mais; Con: Kunak Late; Mustapha Kura

Markotter Stadium
Referee: Evan Urruzmendi

21 April
10:16

Papua New Guinea	12–33	Italy
Try: Derrick Voku; Kadum Mais; Con: Kunak Late	Report	Try: Riccardo Ghelli; Matthias Leon Douglas (2); Federico Cuminetti (2); Con: Francesco Bonavolontà (2); Massimo Cioffi; Nicolò Teneggi

Markotter Stadium
Referee: Caua Ricardo Santos

21 April
11:10

Chile	14–7	Hong Kong
Try: Diego Warnken; Tomas Salas; Con: Diego Warnken; Tomas Salas	Report	Try: Liam Herbert; Con: Russell Webb

Markotter Stadium
Referee: Peter Martin

=== Pool C ===
Pos	Team	Pld	W	D	L	PF	PA	PD	Pts	Qualification
1	Uganda	3	3	0	0	109	15	+94	9	Advance to quarter-finals
2	Brazil	3	2	0	1	39	50	−11	7	Advance to quarter-finals
3	Jamaica	3	1	0	2	41	65	−24	5	
4	South Korea	3	0	0	3	17	76	−59	3	

Source: World Rugby

20 April
10:06

South Korea	12–19	Jamaica
Try: Seongdeok Choi; Junchoul Yang; Con: Hyungoo Jang	Report	Try: Ronaldeni Fraser (2); Aquile Smith; Con: Lucas Roy-Smith; Oscar Clayton

Markotter Stadium
Referee: Tevita Vosalevu

20 April
10:28

Uganda	33–5	Brazil
Try: Adrian Kasito; Aaron Ofoyrwoth (2); Norbert Okeny; Con: Aaron Ofoyrwoth (2); William Nkore; Pen: 1	Report	Try: David Pascoa

Markotter Stadium
Referee: Peter Martin

20 April
13:10

South Korea	5–17	Brazil
Try: Junchoul Yang	Report	Try: Laurent Bourda-Couhet; Carlos Rafael; Robson Morais; Con: Lucas Romeu

Markotter Stadium
Referee: Morgan White

20 April
13:32

Uganda	36–10	Jamaica
Try: Ian Munyani; Adrian Kasito (2); Timothy Kisiga; Norbert Okeny (2); Con: Aaron Ofoyrwoth (2); Timothy Kisiga	Report	Try: Jack Rampton; Aaron Lowe

Markotter Stadium
Referee: Caua Ricardo Santos

21 April
10:16

Jamaica	12–17	Brazil
Try: Mikel Facey; Aaron Lowe; Con: Oscar Clayton	Report	Try: Lucas Romeu; Laurent Bourda-Couhet; Rafael Dos Teixeira; Con: Lorenzo Massari

Markotter Stadium
Referee: Robin Kaluzniak

21 April
10:38

Uganda	40–0	South Korea
Try: Adrian Kasito (2); Desire Ayera; Norbert Okeny (2); Alex Aturinda; Con: Aaron Ofoyrwoth (4); William Nkore	Report

Markotter Stadium
Referee: Tevita Vosalevu

=== Ranking of third-placed teams ===
Pos	Team	Pld	W	D	L	PF	PA	PD	Pts	Qualification
1	Belgium	3	1	1	1	68	54	+14	6	Advance to quarter-finals
2	Italy	3	1	0	2	62	53	+9	5	Advance to quarter-finals
3	Jamaica	3	1	0	2	41	65	−24	5	

Source: World Rugby

== Knockout stage – Leg 1 ==
=== Cup bracket ===
Quarter-finals
21 April – Markotter Stadium
Chile	14
Belgium	21
21 April – Markotter Stadium
Uganda	14
Germany	26
21 April – Markotter Stadium
Hong Kong	35
Brazil	7
21 April – Markotter Stadium
Tonga	29
Italy	7

Semi-finals
22 April – Markotter Stadium
Belgium	5
Germany	19
22 April – Markotter Stadium
Hong Kong	0
Tonga	33

Final
22 April – Markotter Stadium
Germany	14
Tonga	26
Third place
22 April – Markotter Stadium
Belgium	21
Hong Kong	26

Cup quarter-finals

21 April
15:22

Chile	14 - 21	Belgium
Try: Ernesto Tchimino; Gonzalo Lara; Con: Diego Warnken; Tomas Salas	Report	Try: Vincent Hart; Gaspard Lalli; Isaac Montoisy; Con: Vincent Hart; Ryan Godsmark; Isaac Montoisy

Markotter Stadium
Referee: Morgan White

21 April
15:22

Hong Kong	35–7	Brazil
Try: Hugo Stiles; Liam Herbert; Ally Nardoni; Russell Webb; Pierce Mackinlay-West; Con: Russell Webb (5)	Report	Try: Robson Morais; Con: Lorenzo Massari

Markotter Stadium
Referee: Evan Urruzmendi

21 April
15:44

Uganda	14–26	Germany
Try: Aaron Ofoyrwoth; Timothy Kisiga; Con: Aaron Ofoyrwoth (2)	Report	Try: Carlos Soteras Merz; Ben Ellermann; Jack Hunt; Philip Gleitze; Con: Niklas Koch (3)¡

Markotter Stadium
Referee: Robin Kaluzniak

21 April
15:44

Tonga	29–7	Italy
Try: John Tapueluelu; John Ika; Siaosi Huihui; Kyren Taumoefolau (2); Con: Atieli Pakalani	Report	Try: Matthias Leon Douglas; Con: Nicolò Teneggi

Markotter Stadium
Referee: Caua Ricardo Santos

Cup semi-finals

22 April
10:38

Belgium	5–19	Germany
Try: Martin Marenne	Report	Try: Bastian van der Bosch (2); Anton Gleitze; Con: Bastian van der Bosch; Niklas Koch

Markotter Stadium
Referee: Morgan White

22 April
11:00

Hong Kong	0–33	Tonga
	Report	Try: John Tapueluelu (2); Siaosi Huihui (2); Semisi Maasi; Con: Atieli Pakalani (4)

Markotter Stadium
Referee: Peter Martin

Third-place final

22 April
12:14

Belgium	21–26	Hong Kong
Try: Tornike Megrelidze; Victor André; Julien Berger; Con: Vincent Hart (2); Nathan Bontems	Report	Try: Max Denmark (2); James Christie (2); Con: Hugo Stiles (2); Russell Webb

Markotter Stadium
Referee: Caua Ricardo Santos

Cup final

22 April
12:14

Germany	14–26	Tonga
Try: Ben Ellermann; Tim Lichtenberg; Con: Niklas Koch; Nikolai Klewinghaus	Report	Try: Soni Asi; John Tapueluelu; Kyren Taumoefolau; Tevita Manukea; Con: Atieli Pakalani (3)

Markotter Stadium
Referee: Peter Martin

=== 5th–8th bracket ===
5th-place semifinals
22 April – Markotter Stadium
Chile	7
Uganda	12
22 April – Markotter Stadium
Brazil	7
Italy	22

5th-place final
22 April – Markotter Stadium
Uganda	19
Italy	15
7th-place final
22 April – Markotter Stadium
Chile	41
Brazil	0

5th-place semi-finals

22 April
08:00

Chile	7–12	Uganda
Try: Gonzalo Lara; Con: Tomas Salas	Report	Try: Micheal Okorach; Desire Ayera; Con: Aaron Ofoyrwoth

Markotter Stadium
Referee: Caua Ricardo Santos

22 April
08:22

Brazil	7–22	Italy
Try: Laurent Bourda-Couhet; Con: Matheus Cruz Silva	Report	Try: Nicholas Bordin; Matthias Leon Douglas (2); Cristian Lai; Con: Massimo Cioffi

Markotter Stadium
Referee: Robin Kaluzniak

7th-place final

22 April
11:14

Chile	41–0	Brazil
Try: Ernesto Tchimino; Manuel Bustamante; Diego Greiber (2); Jose Escobedo; Alvaro Castro (2); Con: Diego Warnken (3)	Report

Markotter Stadium
Referee: Morgan White

5th-place final

22 April
11:14

Uganda	19–15	Italy
Try: Aaron Ofoyrwoth; Denis Etwau (2); Con: Aaron Ofoyrwoth; William Nkore	Report	Try: Lorenzo Bruno; Filippo Bozzoni; Dewi Passarella

Markotter Stadium
Referee: Tevita Vosalevu

=== 9th–12th bracket ===
9th-place semifinals
21 April – Markotter Stadium
Jamaica	24
Zimbabwe	29
21 April – Markotter Stadium
Papua New Guinea	26
South Korea	22

9th-place final
22 April – Markotter Stadium
Zimbabwe	40
Papua New Guinea	17
11th-place final
22 April – Markotter Stadium
Jamaica	5
South Korea	12

9th-place semi-finals

21 April
13:54

Jamaica	24–29	Zimbabwe
Try: Jack Rampton; Oscar Clayton; Kyan Cherwayko; Norvel Stewart; Con: Lucas Roy-Smith; Oscar Clayton	Report	Try: Takudzwa Kumadiro; Martin Mangongo; Ryan Musumhi; Munesu Muneta; Kudakwashe Nyamakura; Con: Ryan Musumhi (2)

Markotter Stadium
Referee: Tevita Vosalevu

21 April
14:16

Papua New Guinea	26–22	South Korea
Try: Maluai Patala; Kunak Late; Mustapha Kura (2); Con: Kunak Late; Mustapha Kura (2)	Report	Try: Hyungoo Jang (2); Chandeul Kim; Junwoo Lee; Con: Hyungoo Jang

Markotter Stadium
Referee: Peter Martin

11th-place final

22 April
10:38

Jamaica	5–12	South Korea
Try: Jack Rampton	Report	Try: Jaewon Kim; Euitae Kim; Con: Hyungoo Jang

Markotter Stadium
Referee: Caua Ricardo Santos

9th-place final

22 April
11:00

Zimbabwe	40–17	Papua New Guinea
Try: Takudzwa Kumadiro; Martin Mangongo; Ryan Musumhi; Munesu Muneta (2); Nigel Tinarwo; Con: Ryan Musumhi (5)	Report	Try: Mustapha Kura; Kadum Mais; Emmanuel Alfred; Con: Maluai Patala

Markotter Stadium
Referee: Tevita Vosalevu

=== Placings – Leg 1 ===
Leg 1 Summary
Position	Team	Pld	W	L	D
1st	Tonga	6	5	0	1
2nd	Germany	6	3	2	0
3rd	Hong Kong	6	3	3	0
4th	Belgium	6	2	3	1
5th	Uganda	6	5	1	0
6th	Italy	6	2	4	0
7th	Chile	6	4	2	0
8th	Brazil	6	2	4	0
9th	Zimbabwe	5	2	3	0
10th	Papua New Guinea	5	1	4	0
11th	South Korea	5	1	4	0
12th	Jamaica	5	1	4	0

== Pool stage – Leg 2 ==
All times are in SAST, South African Standard Time: (UTC+2).

=== Pool A ===
Pos	Team	Pld	W	D	L	PF	PA	PD	Pts	Qualification
1	Chile	3	3	0	0	75	40	+35	9	Advance to quarter-finals
2	Tonga	3	2	0	1	120	62	+58	7	Advance to quarter-finals
3	Italy	3	1	0	2	89	82	+7	5	Advance to quarter-finals
4	Jamaica	3	0	0	3	40	140	−100	3	

Source: World Rugby

28 April
11:22

Tonga	52–19	Jamaica
	Report

Markotter Stadium
Referee: Caua Ricardo Santos

28 April
11:44

Chile	19–14	Italy
	Report

Markotter Stadium
Referee: Evan Urruzmendi

28 April
14:19

Tonga	19–22	Chile
	Report

Markotter Stadium
Referee: Robin Kaluzniak

28 April
14:46

Italy	54–14	Jamaica
	Report	Try: Godfrey Magaramombe; Con: Ryan Musumhi

Markotter Stadium
Referee: Peter Martin

29 April
10:38

Chile	34-7	Jamaica
	Report

Markotter Stadium
Referee: Morgan White

29 April
11:32

Italy	21–49	Tonga
	Report

Markotter Stadium
Referee: Evan Urruzmendi

=== Pool B ===
Pos	Team	Pld	W	D	L	PF	PA	PD	Pts	Qualification
1	Germany	3	3	0	0	88	10	+78	9	Advance to quarter-finals
2	Uganda	3	2	0	1	57	26	+31	7	Advance to quarter-finals
3	South Korea	3	1	0	2	24	88	−64	5	
4	Brazil	3	0	0	3	31	76	−45	3	

Source: World Rugby

28 April
10:06

Germany	48–0	South Korea
	Report

Markotter Stadium
Referee: Robin Kaluzniak

28 April
10:28

Uganda	31–7	Brazil
	Report

Markotter Stadium
Referee: Morgan White

28 April
13:10

Germany	28–10	Brazil
	Report

Markotter Stadium
Referee: Tevita Vosalevu

28 April
13:32

Uganda	26–7	South Korea
	Report

Markotter Stadium
Referee: Evan Urruzmendi

29 April
10:16

South Korea	17–14	Brazil
	Report

Markotter Stadium
Referee: Caua Ricardo Santos

29 April
11:10

Uganda	0–12	Germany
	Report

Markotter Stadium
Referee: Peter Martin

=== Pool C ===
Pos	Team	Pld	W	D	L	PF	PA	PD	Pts	Qualification
1	Hong Kong	3	3	0	0	88	17	+71	9	Advance to quarter-finals
2	Belgium	3	2	0	1	52	41	+11	7	Advance to quarter-finals
3	Papua New Guinea	3	1	0	2	45	73	−28	5	Advance to quarter-finals
4	Zimbabwe	3	0	0	3	24	78	−54	3	

Source: World Rugby

28 April
10:06

Belgium	24–5	Zimbabwe
	Report

Markotter Stadium
Referee: Tevita Vosalevu

28 April
10:28

Papua New Guinea	5–38	Hong Kong
	Report

Markotter Stadium
Referee: Peter Martin

28 April
13:10

Papua New Guinea	19–28	Belgium
	Report

Markotter Stadium
Referee: Morgan White

28 April
13:32

Hong Kong	33–12	Zimbabwe
	Report

Markotter Stadium
Referee: Caua Ricardo Santos

29 April
10:16

Zimbabwe	7–21	Papua New Guinea
	Report

Markotter Stadium
Referee: Robin Kaluzniak

29 April
10:38

Belgium	0–17	Hong Kong
	Report

Markotter Stadium
Referee: Tevita Vosalevu

=== Ranking of third-placed teams ===
Pos	Team	Pld	W	D	L	PF	PA	PD	Pts	Qualification
1	Italy	3	2	0	1	89	82	+7	7	Advance to quarter-finals
2	Papua New Guinea	3	1	0	2	45	73	−28	5	Advance to quarter-finals
3	South Korea	3	1	0	2	24	88	−64	5	

Source: World Rugby

== Knockout stage – Leg 2 ==
=== Cup bracket ===
Quarter-finals
29 April – Markotter Stadium
Germany	21
Italy	12
29 April – Markotter Stadium
Hong Kong	12
Tonga	33
29 April – Markotter Stadium
Uganda	7
Belgium	12
29 April – Markotter Stadium
Chile	29
Papua New Guinea	17

Semi-finals
29 April – Markotter Stadium
Germany	26
Tonga	33
29 April – Markotter Stadium
Belgium	17
Chile	14

Final
30 April – Markotter Stadium
Tonga	26
Belgium	28
Third place
30 April – Markotter Stadium
Germany	12
Chile	19

Cup quarter-finals

29 April
15:22

Germany	21- 12	Italy
	Report

Markotter Stadium
Referee: Morgan White

29 April
15:22

Uganda	7– 12	Belgium
	Report

Markotter Stadium
Referee: Evan Urruzmendi

29 April
15:44

Hong Kong	12– 33	Tonga
	Report

Markotter Stadium
Referee: Robin Kaluzniak

29 April
15:44

Chile	29– 17	Papua New Guinea
	Report

Markotter Stadium
Referee: Caua Ricardo Santos

Cup semi-finals

30 April
10:38

Germany	26–33	Tonga
	Report

Markotter Stadium
Referee: Morgan White

30 April
11:00

Belgium	17–14	Chile
	Report

Markotter Stadium
Referee: Peter Martin

Third-place final

30 April
12:14

Germany	12–19	Chile
	Report

Markotter Stadium
Referee: Caua Ricardo Santos

Cup final

30 April
12:14

Tonga	26–28	Belgium
	Report

Markotter Stadium
Referee: Peter Martin

=== 5th–8th bracket ===
5th-place semifinals
30 April – Markotter Stadium
Hong Kong	20
Italy	5
30 April – Markotter Stadium
Uganda	24
Papua New Guinea	21

5th-place final
30 April – Markotter Stadium
Hong Kong	17
Uganda	7
7th-place final
30 April – Markotter Stadium
Italy	26
Papua New Guinea	19

5th-place semi-finals

30 April
09:00

Italy	5–20	Hong Kong
	Report

Markotter Stadium
Referee: Caua Ricardo Santos

30 April
09:22

Uganda	24–21	Papua New Guinea
	Report

Markotter Stadium
Referee: Robin Kaluzniak

7th-place final

30 April
12:22

Italy	26–19	Papua New Guinea
	Report

Markotter Stadium
Referee: Morgan White

5th-place final

30 April
11:14

Hong Kong	17–7	Uganda
	Report

Markotter Stadium
Referee: Tevita Vosalevu

=== 9th–12th bracket ===
9th-place semifinals
29 April – Markotter Stadium
South Korea	26
Jamaica	12
29 April – Markotter Stadium
Brazil	24
Zimbabwe	19

9th-place final
30 April – Markotter Stadium
South Korea	0
Brazil	35
11th-place final
30 April – Markotter Stadium
Jamaica	5
Zimbabwe	50

9th-place semi-finals

29 April
13:54

South Korea	26–12	Jamaica
	Report

Markotter Stadium
Referee: Tevita Vosalevu

29 April
14:16

Brazil	24–19	Zimbabwe
	Report

Markotter Stadium
Referee: Peter Martin

11th-place final

30 April
10:38

Jamaica	5–50	Zimbabwe
	Report

Markotter Stadium
Referee: Caua Ricardo Santos

9th-place final

30 April
11:00

South Korea	0–35	Brazil
	Report

Markotter Stadium
Referee: Tevita Vosalevu

=== Placings – Leg 2 ===
Leg 2 Summary
Position	Team	Pld	W	L	D
1st	Belgium	6	5	1	0
2nd	Tonga	6	4	2	0
3rd	Chile	6	5	1	0
4th	Germany	6	4	2	0
5th	Hong Kong	6	5	1	0
6th	Uganda	6	3	3	0
7th	Italy	6	2	4	0
8th	Papua New Guinea	6	1	5	0
9th	Brazil	5	2	3	0
10th	South Korea	5	2	3	0
11th	Zimbabwe	5	1	4	0
12th	Jamaica	5	0	5	0

== See also ==
- 2023 World Rugby Sevens Challenger Series – Women's tour
