= Uruguay Sevens =

Annual international rugby sevens tournament

- Seven Punta logo
- Sport: Rugby sevens
- Founded: 1989
- No. of teams: 16 (2020)
- Most recent champion: Japan (2020)

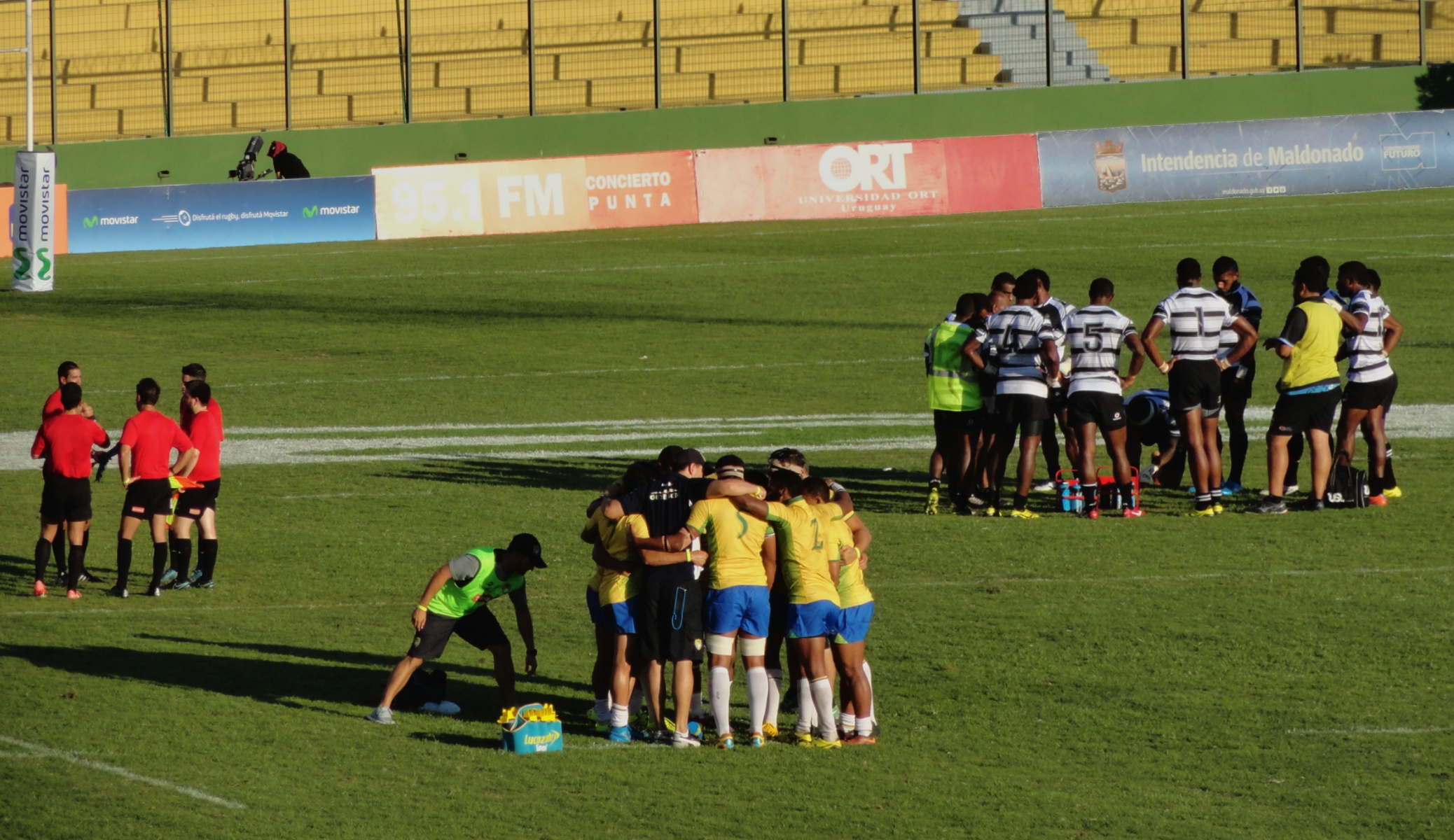
Brazil and Fiji at Punta del Este in 2017.

The Uruguay Sevens, branded as Seven Punta, is an annual international rugby sevens tournament. Currently held in the capital Montevideo, it was hosted as the Punta del Este Sevens in the resort city of the same name for three decades from 1989 onwards. The tournament retains that history in its branding.

The event was formerly part of the IRB Sevens World Series for the inaugural season in 2000. In recent years it has been part of the Sudamérica Sevens Series and the World Sevens Challenger Series.

The tournament is organised by the Old Boys Club, usually in January or February. It attracts the participation of clubs from Uruguay and neighboring countries such as Argentina, as well as selected provincial and national teams.

Internationally, it is the highest profile Uruguayan rugby event, and has attracted players of the calibre of Jonah Lomu in the past, as well as teams like Fiji, Argentina, New Zealand, Samoa and Belgium Barbarians

== International sevens ==
The tournament was first played in 1989 and featured mostly club teams from Uruguay and Argentina in the early years. Its history as an international event grew in the 1990s when many of the best players and teams in the world travelled to Uruguay for the Seven Punta.

=== International 7s and World Series: 1993 to 2001 ===
The inaugural Punta del Este International Sevens tournament in 1993 attracted teams from Australia, France, England and New Zealand, as well as neighbours Argentina and Paraguay, plus Uruguay itself as host. The final was won by New Zealand, defeating Australia in a closely fought match by 26–19. Other national teams including Fiji, Tonga and Samoa were added to the field in subsequent years as the tournament grew in status. Punta del Este was included as a stop on the 1999–2000 World Sevens Series but was dropped from the tour after the inaugural season. After one further event in 2001, won by Argentina who defeated New Zealand by 26–21 in the final, the international sevens at Punta del Este ceased.

Season		Venue	Cup final			Placings		Refs
		Punta del Este	Winner	Score	Runner-up	Plate	Bowl	
I – IV	For club & invitational 1989 to 1992 — See § Early years							
V	1993	Estadio Domingo Burgueño	All Blacks VII	26–19	Australia	(Argentina); Buenos Aires	(Argentina); Cuyo	
VI	1994	Estadio Domingo Burgueño	Fiji Cavaliers	35–12	New Zealand	(Argentina); Rosario	(France); Cote d'Aquitaine	
VII	1995	Estadio Ginés Cairo Medina	Argentina	36–19	(Australia); Aus Barbarians	FIRA (Note: Fédération Internationale de Rugby Amateur selection from France, Spain, Portugal, Italy, Holland, Morocco, Tunisia.)	Tonga	
VIII	1996	Estadio Domingo Burgueño	New Zealand	31–26	France	(Argentina); Buenos Aires	(Uruguay); Old Boys	
IX	1997 ^{RWC Qual.}	Estadio Domingo Burgueño	France	35–14	Western Samoa	Argentina	Uruguay	
X	1998	Estadio Domingo Burgueño	New Zealand	42–19	Fiji	Western Samoa	?	
XI	1999	Estadio Domingo Burgueño	New Zealand	38–44	Argentina	Western Samoa	n/a	
XII	2000	Estadio Domingo Burgueño	New Zealand	42–19	Fiji	Australia	France	
XIII	2001	Estadio Domingo Burgueño	Argentina VII	26–21	New Zealand VII	Uruguay	(Uruguay) (Note: Recorded as Paysandú (possibly a regional selection) by Rugby7, in other sources as Trébol de Paysandú [es].); Paysandú	

Key:
Dark blue line indicates a tournament included in the World Rugby Sevens Series.

=== Select teams events: 2005 and 2012 ===
After the tournament was restarted in 2003 as an event for club teams, some national and invitational sides began to be attracted back to play against the clubs, and occasionally a parallel international tournament was included again at the Punta del Este Sevens. The first was an IRB satellite competition in 2005 which included several national teams. In 2012, an all-selection tournament for national and invitational teams was played, with Argentina defeating South Africa's academy to win the final.

Season		Venue	Cup final			Placings		Refs
		Punta del Este	Winner	Score	Runner-up	Third	Fourth	
XVI	2005^{(IRB)}	Estadio Domingo Burgueño	Argentina	38–14	(Argentina) (Note: La Ballena Moby Dick: a composite team mainly from Argentina, under the banner of local Punta bar, Moby Dick.); Moby Dick	Uruguay	(Argentina) (Note: BFL Mercosur: a sponsored invitational team of players selected from Argentina and France.); BFL Mercosur	
XXIII	2012	Estadio Domingo Burgueño	(Note: UAR 7s (Argentina VII)); Argentina VII	22–5	SA 7s Academy	Uruguay	Chile	

=== International sevens: 2017 onward ===
From 2017 to 2019 the Seven Punta was included on the annual Sudamérica Rugby Sevens series, and contested by selected international teams. In 2020 the tournament was part of the World Sevens Challenger Series. It was relocated for the first time to Montevideo but kept the Seven Punta name. Japan won the cup final in 2020, defeating host nation Uruguay in extra time.

Season		Venue	Cup final			Placings		Refs
		Punta del Este	Winner	Score	Runner-up	Third	Fourth	
XXVIII	2017	Estadio Domingo Burgueño	Argentina	22–21	Fiji	Chile	USA Falcons	
XXIX	2018	Estadio Domingo Burgueño	SA 7s Academy	21−5	Chile	France	Uruguay	
XXX	2019	Estadio Domingo Burgueño	Chile	7–5	Argentina VII	Portugal	Germany	
		Montevideo	Winner	Score	Runner-up	Third	Fourth	
XXXI	2020	Estadio Charrua	Japan	5–0^{(a.e.t.)}	Uruguay	Hong Kong	Chile	

Key:
Light blue line indicates a tournament included in the Sudamérica Rugby Sevens series.
Green line indicates a tournament included in the World Rugby Sevens Challenger Series.

== Club and invitational tournament ==
=== Early years: 1989 to 1992 ===
The first four tournaments featured mainly South American club teams although host club Old Boys organised an invitational team known as "Anzacs Old Boys" which won the Cup in 1991 and 1992. That team featured notable players from Australia and New Zealand, including John Eales, Jason Little, Eric Rush and Frank Bunce alongside players such as South American representative Gabriel Travaglini. In 1993 the tournament became the Punta del Este International Sevens and featured selected national teams from around the world.

Season		Venue	Cup final		Refs
		Club & Invitational	Winner	Runner-up	
I	1989	Estadio Domingo Burgueño	(Uruguay); Old Boys	(Argentina); Banco Nación	
II	1990	Estadio Domingo Burgueño	(Argentina); Los Tilos	(Argentina); Pueyrredón	
III	1991	Estadio Domingo Burgueño	Anzacs Old Boys	(Argentina); Los Tilos	
IV	1992	Estadio Domingo Burgueño	Anzacs Old Boys	(Argentina); Pueyrredón	

=== Gold Cup: 2003 onwards ===
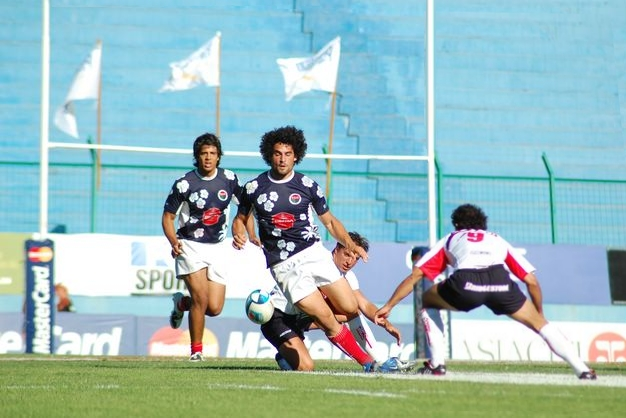
PSG (Pucaru) player chases the ball, 7 Punta 2010.

Following a one year hiatus after the international sevens had ended in 2001, the event was restarted in 2003 as a tournament for club teams in a return to roots. For the fourteen seasons from 2003 to 2016, the tournament was contested mainly by club teams, but with the occasional national representative selections and sponsored invitational teams entered in the same division. Since 2017, club teams have competed in a separate division to international selections.

A Gold Cup is awarded to the champion team. Silver and Bronze Cups were usually awarded to teams winning the lower bracket playoffs, (Note: Gold, Silver and Bronze cups are the nominal trophies for many rugby sevens tournaments in South America. These are generally equivalent to the Cup, Plate and Bowl – for first, fifth and ninth place, respectively – as awarded in the traditional sevens tournament with sixteen teams. For an event with a different number of teams or divisions, however, these trophies may awarded differently.) although the minor placings in the top bracket were given recognition in 2017.

Season		Venue	Gold Cup			Placings		Refs
	Club	& invitational	Winner	Score	Runner-up	Silver Cup	Bronze Cup	
No tournament in 2002
XIV	2003	Estadio Domingo Burgueño	(Uruguay); Old Boys	13–7	(Uruguay); Old Christians	(Argentina); La Tablada	(Uruguay); Pucaru _{[es]}	
XV	2004	Estadio Domingo Burgueño	(Argentina); Hindú	22–19	(Argentina); La Ballena	(Argentina); Marista Mendoza	Uruguay	
XVI	2005	Estadio Domingo Burgueño	(Argentina); Alumni	27–14	(Argentina); Hindú	(Uruguay); Old Christians	n/a	
XVII	2006	Estadio Domingo Burgueño	(Argentina); Moby Dick	24–5	(Argentina); Jockey de Salta	(Uruguay); Old Christians	(Uruguay); Pucaru _{[es]}	
XVIII	2007	Estadio Domingo Burgueño	(Argentina); San Isidro CASI	26–17	(Argentina); Moby Dick	(Argentina); Hindú	(Argentina); San Isidro SIC	
XIX	2008	Estadio Domingo Burgueño	Samoa	25–0	(Argentina); Buenos Aires	Tonga	(Argentina); Jockey de Salta	
XX	2009	Estadio Domingo Burgueño	Samoa	34–14	Argentina	Tonga	(Argentina); Los Tordos	
XXI	2010	Estadio Domingo Burgueño	(Argentina); Buenos Aires	17–12	Samoa	Tonga	Bridgestone VII	
XXII	2011	Estadio Domingo Burgueño	(Argentina); Buenos Aires	19–10	(Argentina); Salta _{[es]}	(Argentina); Córdoba Athletic	(Argentina); Moby Dick	
XXIII	2012	Estadio Domingo Burgueño	(Argentina) (Note: Personal VII: an invitational team sponsored by mobile phone company Telecom Personal.); Personal VII	19–10	(Argentina); Moby Dick	(Argentina); Buenos Aires	(Uruguay); Paysandú Clubs	
XXIV	2013	Estadio Domingo Burgueño	(Argentina); Buenos Aires	39–0	(Argentina); Moby Dick	Uruguay	(Argentina); Jockey de Salta	
XXV	2014	Estadio Domingo Burgueño	SA 7s Academy	19–14	(Argentina); Moby Dick	Uruguay VII	(Argentina); Pucará	
XXVI	2014–15	Punta del Este Polo & Country Club	(Argentina); Moby Dick	15–7	Chile	Uruguay	(Argentina); Pucará	
XXVII	2015–16	Punta del Este Polo & Country Club	(Argentina); Córdoba Athletic	21–5	(Argentina); Moby Dick	(Argentina); Pucará	(Argentina); Liceo Naval	
	Club	& invitational	Winner	Score	Runner-up	Third	Fourth	
XXVIII	2017	Estadio Domingo Burgueño	(Argentina); Córdoba Athletic	28–7	(Argentina); La Tablada	(Uruguay); Trébol	(Uruguay); Carrasco Polo	
XXIX	No club competition in 2018							
XXX	2019	Estadio Domingo Burgueño	(Argentina); CURNE (Note: A university rugby club based in the city of Resistencia in north-eastern Argentina.)	17–12	(Uruguay); Old Boys	(Argentina); La Tablada	(Uruguay); Trébol	
	Club –	Seven de Old Boys	Winner	Score	Runner-up	Silver Cup	Bronze Cup	
XXXI	2019–20	Estadio Charrua, Montevideo	(Uruguay); Old Boys	15–10	(Argentina); CURNE	(Uruguay); Lobos	?	

== Bibliography ==
- Bath, Richard (ed.) The Complete Book of Rugby (Seven Oaks Ltd, 1997 ISBN 1-86200-013-1)
