= Rainer Kumm =

- Born: Rainer Kumm Hanover, Germany

Rugby union career
Amateur team(s)
Years	Team	Apps	(Points)
1986–2000	TSV Victoria Linden		
International career
Years	Team	Apps	(Points)
1989–1996	Germany / West Germany		
National sevens team
Years	Team		Comps
1990–2000	Germany		

Rainer Kumm is a retired German rugby player, who played fly-half for the German national team as well as the German Sevens team, a team he captained in the late 1990s.

Kumm was a member of the German national team which toured Canada in 1988 and later competed in the erstwhile FIRA Tournaments. He was also part of the Germany sevens squads, which won the Bowl final of the 1990 Hong Kong Sevens, reached the Plate Final of the 1997 Punta Del Este Sevens, won the Bowl Final of the 1997 Paris Sevens, and contested the Bowl Final of the 2000 IRB Sevens World Series tournament in Punta del Este.

He played club rugby for TSV Victoria Linden in Hanover, with whom he won the German Championship in 1987, 1989, 1993, 1994 and 1996, and contested further finals in 1991, 1995, 1997, 1998 and 2000. Kumm also captained Victoria Linden to the German Sevens Championship in 2000.

After Kumm's retirement he took over from Gerhard Barthel as coach of the Germany national sevens team.
