= 2019 Sudamérica Rugby Sevens =

- Hosts: Uruguay
- Date: 5–13 January 2019

Final positions
- Champions: Chile
- Runners-up: Argentina
- Third: Portugal

The 2019 Sudamérica Rugby Sevens was the thirteenth edition of the Sudamérica Rugby Sevens, the continental championship for rugby sevens in South America. The competition took place as a series over two legs, the first tournament at Punta del Este in Uruguay, and the second at Viña del Mar in Chile.

Chile won both tournaments to take out the series title and gain entry to the USA Sevens and Canada Sevens in 2019, as well as a berth at the inaugural Challenger Series for a chance to qualify to the World Sevens Series in 2020–21.

Uruguay finished fourth in the series and also gained a berth at the Challenger Series as the next highest-placed team from Sudamérica not already in the World Series.

== Teams ==
Twelve teams competed in the series, six teams from the Sudamérica Rugby region together with six invited international teams.

- Argentina
- Brazil
- Canada Maple Leafs (Note: Invitational team)
- Chile
- Colombia
- Germany
- Paraguay
- Portugal
- Russia
- SA 7s Academy
- USA Falcons
- Uruguay

== Series standings ==
Final standings over the two legs of the series:

| Pos | Team | Viña del Mar | Punta del Este | Total points | Qualification |
|---|---|---|---|---|---|
| 1 | Chile | 22 | 22 | 44 | USA and Canada events in 2019; Challenger Series in 2020 |
| 2 | Argentina | 19 | 17 | 36 | |
| 3 | Portugal | 17 | 15 | 32 | |
| 4 | Uruguay | 8 | 19 | 27 | Challenger Series in 2020 |
| 5 | Germany | 15 | 8 | 23 | |
| 6 | SA 7s Academy | 10 | 12 | 22 | |
| 7 | USA Falcons | 12 | 5 | 17 | |
| 8 | Russia | 3 | 10 | 13 | |
| 9 | Colombia | 2 | 7 | 9 | |
| 10 | Canada Maple Leafs | 7 | 1 | 8 | |
| 11 | Paraguay | 5 | 3 | 8 | |
| 12 | Brazil | 1 | 2 | 3 | |

Legend
| Dark bar | Already a core team in the World Series |
| Dotted bar | Invited team not eligible for qualification from Sudamérica |

== Punta del Este Sevens ==
The first leg of the series was held on 5–6 January 2019.

All times are in Uruguay Standard Time (UTC−03:00)

=== Placings ===
| Event | Winners | Score | Finalists | Semifinalists |
|---|---|---|---|---|
| Cup | Chile | 7−5 | Argentina | Portugal; Germany |
| 5th place | United States Falcons | Suspended (Note: Due to adverse weather conditions at the time, the match was called off and both teams agreed to determine the result through a coin flip. The result had the United States earn fifth place in the tournament) | South Africa 7s Academy | Uruguay; Canada Maple Leafs |
| 9th place | Paraguay | 21−7 | Russia | Colombia; Brazil |

Source: Sudamerica Rugby

=== Pool stage ===
==== Group A ====
| Teams | Pld | W | D | L | PF | PA | +/− | Pts |
|---|---|---|---|---|---|---|---|---|
| Chile | 3 | 3 | 0 | 0 | 102 | 26 | +76 | 9 |
| United States Falcons | 3 | 1 | 1 | 1 | 69 | 53 | +16 | 6 |
| Germany | 3 | 1 | 1 | 1 | 80 | 71 | +9 | 6 |
| Paraguay | 3 | 0 | 0 | 3 | 17 | 118 | −101 | 3 |

5 January 2019
16:25

| Chile | 28−21 | Germany |

Estadio Domingo Burgueño, Maldonado

5 January 2019
16:47

| United States Falcons | 38−0 | Paraguay |

Estadio Domingo Burgueño, Maldonado

5 January 2019
18:37

| Chile | 47−0 | Paraguay |

Estadio Domingo Burgueño, Maldonado

5 January 2019
18:59

| United States Falcons | 26−26 | Germany |

Estadio Domingo Burgueño, Maldonado

5 January 2019
20:49

| Germany | 33−17 | Paraguay |

Estadio Domingo Burgueño, Maldonado

5 January 2019
21:33

| United States Falcons | 5−27 | Chile |

Estadio Domingo Burgueño, Maldonado

==== Group B ====
| Teams | Pld | W | D | L | PF | PA | +/− | Pts |
|---|---|---|---|---|---|---|---|---|
| Uruguay | 3 | 3 | 0 | 0 | 52 | 17 | +35 | 9 |
| South Africa 7s Academy | 3 | 2 | 0 | 1 | 36 | 12 | +24 | 7 |
| Colombia | 3 | 0 | 1 | 2 | 21 | 31 | −10 | 4 |
| Russia | 3 | 0 | 1 | 2 | 29 | 66 | −37 | 4 |

5 January 2019
17:53

| Uruguay | 19−7 | Colombia |

Estadio Domingo Burgueño, Maldonado

5 January 2019
18:15

| South Africa 7s Academy | 26−5 | Russia |

Estadio Domingo Burgueño, Maldonado

5 January 2019
20:05

| Russia | 10−26 | Uruguay |

Estadio Domingo Burgueño, Maldonado

5 January 2019
20:27

| South Africa 7s Academy | 10−0 | Colombia |

Estadio Domingo Burgueño, Maldonado

5 January 2019
21:55

| Russia | 14−14 | Colombia |

Estadio Domingo Burgueño, Maldonado

5 January 2019
22:39

| South Africa 7s Academy | 0−7 | Uruguay |

Estadio Domingo Burgueño, Maldonado

==== Group C ====
| Teams | Pld | W | D | L | PF | PA | +/− | Pts |
|---|---|---|---|---|---|---|---|---|
| Argentina | 3 | 3 | 0 | 0 | 122 | 5 | +117 | 9 |
| Portugal | 3 | 2 | 0 | 1 | 70 | 73 | −3 | 7 |
| Canada Maple Leafs | 3 | 1 | 0 | 2 | 66 | 70 | −4 | 5 |
| Brazil | 3 | 0 | 0 | 3 | 12 | 122 | −110 | 3 |

5 January 2019
17:09

| Canada Maple Leafs | 21−28 | Portugal |

Estadio Domingo Burgueño, Maldonado

5 January 2019
17:31

| Argentina | 40−0 | Brazil |

Estadio Domingo Burgueño, Maldonado

5 January 2019
19:21

| Canada Maple Leafs | 40−7 | Brazil |

Estadio Domingo Burgueño, Maldonado

5 January 2019
19:43

| Argentina | 47−0 | Portugal |

Estadio Domingo Burgueño, Maldonado

5 January 2019
21:11

| Portugal | 42−5 | Brazil |

Estadio Domingo Burgueño, Maldonado

5 January 2019
22:17

| Argentina | 35−5 | Canada Maple Leafs |

Estadio Domingo Burgueño, Maldonado

=== Knockout stage ===
==== 9th–12th bracket ====
Semi-finals
6 January 2019 – 15:00 – Estadio Domingo Burgueño, Maldonado
Colombia | 5
Paraguay | 12
6 January 2019 – 15:22 – Estadio Domingo Burgueño, Maldonado
Russia | 28
Brazil | 12

Final
6 January 2019 – 18:14 – Estadio Domingo Burgueño, Maldonado
Paraguay | 21
Russia | 7
Eleventh Place
6 January 2019 – 17:52 – Estadio Domingo Burgueño, Maldonado
Colombia | 24
Brazil | 21

==== 5th–8th bracket ====
Semi-finals
6 January 2019 – 19:56 – Estadio Domingo Burgueño, Maldonado
United States Falcons | 17
Uruguay | 0
6 January 2019 – 20:18 – Estadio Domingo Burgueño, Maldonado
South Africa 7s Academy | 12
Canada Maple Leafs | 5

Final
6 January 2019 – 22:06 – Estadio Domingo Burgueño, Maldonado
United States Falcons | Suspended
South Africa 7s Academy
Seventh Place
6 January 2019 – 21:24 – Estadio Domingo Burgueño, Maldonado
Uruguay | 31
Canada Maple Leafs | 14

==== Cup ====
Quarter-finals
6 January 2019 – 16:24 – Estadio Domingo Burgueño, Maldonado
Argentina | 31
United States Falcons | 7
6 January 2019 – 16:46 – Estadio Domingo Burgueño, Maldonado
Uruguay | 17
Germany | 19
6 January 2019 – 17:08 – Estadio Domingo Burgueño, Maldonado
South Africa 7s Academy | 17
Portugal | 19
6 January 2019 – 17:30 – Estadio Domingo Burgueño, Maldonado
Chile | 31
Canada Maple Leafs | 5

Semi-finals
6 January 2019 – 20:40 – Estadio Domingo Burgueño, Maldonado
Argentina | 34
Germany | 0
6 January 2019 – 21:02 – Estadio Domingo Burgueño, Maldonado
Portugal | 14
Chile | 24

Final
6 January 2019 – 22:50 – Estadio Domingo Burgueño, Maldonado
Argentina | 5
Chile | 7
Third place
6 January 2019 – 22:28 – Estadio Domingo Burgueño, Maldonado
Germany | 5
Portugal | 19

Source: Sudamerica Rugby

== Viña del Mar Sevens ==
The second leg of the series was held on 12–13 January 2019.

All times are in Chile Summer Time (UTC−03:00)

=== Placings ===
| Event | Winners | Score | Finalists | Semifinalists |
|---|---|---|---|---|
| Cup | Chile | 31–7 | Uruguay | Argentina; Portugal |
| 5th place | South Africa 7s Academy | 22–5 | Russia | Germany; Colombia |
| 9th place | United States Falcons | 26–5 | Paraguay | Brazil; Canada Maple Leafs |

=== Pool stage ===
==== Group A ====
| Teams | Pld | W | D | L | PF | PA | +/− | Pts |
|---|---|---|---|---|---|---|---|---|
| South Africa 7s Academy | 3 | 3 | 0 | 0 | 67 | 29 | +38 | 9 |
| Chile | 3 | 2 | 0 | 1 | 52 | 36 | +16 | 7 |
| Uruguay | 3 | 1 | 0 | 2 | 55 | 62 | −7 | 5 |
| Brazil | 3 | 0 | 0 | 3 | 21 | 68 | −47 | 3 |

12 January 2019
12:40

| South Africa 7s Academy | 34−12 | Uruguay |

The Mackay School, Viña del Mar

12 January 2019
13:00

| Chile | 21−7 | Brazil |

The Mackay School, Viña del Mar

12 January 2019
16:00

| South Africa 7s Academy | 14−7 | Brazil |

The Mackay School, Viña del Mar

12 January 2019
16:20

| Chile | 21−10 | Uruguay |

The Mackay School, Viña del Mar

12 January 2019
19:40

| Uruguay | 33−7 | Brazil |

The Mackay School, Viña del Mar

12 January 2019
20:20

| Chile | 10−19 | South Africa 7s Academy |

The Mackay School, Viña del Mar

==== Group B ====
| Teams | Pld | W | D | L | PF | PA | +/− | Pts |
|---|---|---|---|---|---|---|---|---|
| Colombia | 3 | 2 | 0 | 1 | 54 | 48 | +6 | 7 |
| Argentina | 3 | 2 | 0 | 1 | 59 | 56 | +3 | 7 |
| Canada Maple Leafs | 3 | 1 | 0 | 2 | 45 | 40 | +5 | 5 |
| United States Falcons | 3 | 1 | 0 | 2 | 38 | 52 | −14 | 5 |

12 January 2019
11:20

| United States Falcons | 19−14 | Canada Maple Leafs |

The Mackay School, Viña del Mar

12 January 2019
11:40

| Argentina | 33−21 | Colombia |

The Mackay School, Viña del Mar

12 January 2019
14:40

| United States Falcons | 5−19 | Colombia |

The Mackay School, Viña del Mar

12 January 2019
15:00

| Argentina | 7−21 | Canada Maple Leafs |

The Mackay School, Viña del Mar

12 January 2019
18:20

| Canada Maple Leafs | 10−14 | Colombia |

The Mackay School, Viña del Mar

12 January 2019
18:40

| Argentina | 19−14 | United States Falcons |

The Mackay School, Viña del Mar

==== Group C ====
| Teams | Pld | W | D | L | PF | PA | +/− | Pts |
|---|---|---|---|---|---|---|---|---|
| Germany | 3 | 3 | 0 | 0 | 72 | 31 | +41 | 9 |
| Portugal | 3 | 2 | 0 | 1 | 83 | 36 | +47 | 7 |
| Russia | 3 | 1 | 0 | 2 | 62 | 48 | +14 | 5 |
| Paraguay | 3 | 0 | 0 | 3 | 7 | 109 | −102 | 3 |

12 January 2019
12:00

| Germany | 31−0 | Paraguay |

The Mackay School, Viña del Mar

12 January 2019
12:20

| Portugal | 24−12 | Russia |

The Mackay School, Viña del Mar

12 January 2019
15:20

| Germany | 24−19 | Russia |

The Mackay School, Viña del Mar

12 January 2019
15:40

| Portugal | 47−7 | Paraguay |

The Mackay School, Viña del Mar

12 January 2019
19:00

| Paraguay | 0−31 | Russia |

The Mackay School, Viña del Mar

12 January 2019
19:20

| Portugal | 12−17 | Germany |

The Mackay School, Viña del Mar

Source: Sudamerica Rugby

=== Knockout stage ===
==== 9th–12th bracket ====
Semi-finals
13 January 2018 – 12:30 – The Mackay School, Viña del Mar
United States Falcons | 35
Brazil | 0
13 January 2018 – 12:50 – The Mackay School, Viña del Mar
Canada Maple Leafs | 12
Paraguay | 17

Final
13 January 2018 – 17:40 – The Mackay School, Viña del Mar
United States Falcons | 26
Paraguay | 5
Eleventh Place
13 January 2018 – 17:20 – The Mackay School, Viña del Mar
Brazil | 24
Canada Maple Leafs | 17

==== 5th–8th bracket ====
Semi-finals
13 January 2018 – 15:30 – The Mackay School, Viña del Mar
Russia | 19
Germany | 15
13 January 2018 – 15:50 – The Mackay School, Viña del Mar
South Africa 7s Academy | 15
Colombia | 10

Final
13 January 2018 – 18:40 – The Mackay School, Viña del Mar
Russia | 5
South Africa 7s Academy | 22
Seventh Place
13 January 2018 – 18:00 – The Mackay School, Viña del Mar
Germany | 47
Colombia | 5

==== Cup ====
Quarter-finals
13 January 2018 – 13:30 – The Mackay School, Viña del Mar
Argentina | 22
Russia | 14
13 January 2018 – 13:50 – The Mackay School, Viña del Mar
Germany | 7
Chile | 17
13 January 2018 – 13:10 – The Mackay School, Viña del Mar
South Africa 7s Academy | 12
Uruguay | 14
13 January 2018 – 14:10 – The Mackay School, Viña del Mar
Colombia | 12
Portugal | 36

Semi-finals
13 January 2018 – 16:10 – The Mackay School, Viña del Mar
Argentina | 0
Chile | 35
13 January 2018 – 16:30 – The Mackay School, Viña del Mar
Uruguay | 19
Portugal | 14

Final
13 January 2018 – 19:50 – The Mackay School, Viña del Mar
Chile | 31
Uruguay | 7
Third place
13 January 2018 – 19:00 – The Mackay School, Viña del Mar
Argentina | 31
Portugal | 21
