= Mark Schulze =

- Born: Natal Province, South Africa
- School: Deutsche Schule Hermannsburg
- University: University of Natal

Rugby union career
- Position: Scrum-half
Amateur team(s)
Years	Team	Apps	(Points)
1989-1993	Natal University		
1994-1995	Old Boys (Durban)		
1996-1997	TSV Victoria Linden		
1999	RG Heidelberg		
Senior career
Years	Team	Apps	(Points)
1997-1998	LondonScottish		
Provincial / State sides
Years	Team	Apps	(Points)
1992-1994	Natal	Duikers/B	
1995-1996	PSW		
International career
Years	Team	Apps	(Points)
1996–2000	Germany		
National sevens team
Years	Team		Comps
1996–2000	Germany		

Mark Schulze was a South African-born German international rugby player who played for both the Germany national rugby union team, which he captained on occasion, and Germany Sevens team from 1996 to 2000.

Schulze attended the German School in Hermannsburg, KwaZulu-Natal and Natal University. He was a member of various Natal squads before transferring to TSV Victoria Linden in Hanover, with whom he reached the finals of the 1996 and 1997 German Championships. He later spent a season with RG Heidelberg with whom he reached the finals of the 1999 German Championship.

Schulze represented Germany in the FIRA Tournament from 1996 to 2000, Rugby World Cup qualification matches and in the European Nations Cup.

He was also a member of the Germany Sevens team, which reached the Plate Final of the 1997 Punta Del Este Sevens, won the Bowl Final of the 1997 Paris Sevens, and contested the Bowl Final of the 2000 IRB World Sevens tournament in Punta del Este.

He retired from rugby after the German Rugby Federation Centenary Match against the Barbarians in 2000.

== Honours ==
=== Club ===
- German rugby union championship - TSV Victoria Linden 1996
- German Rugby Sevens championship - RG Heidelberg 1999

=== Germany Sevens Team ===
- Paris Sevens - Air France Bowl 1997
