= 2020 World Rugby Sevens Challenger Series – Men's tour =

2020 Sevens Challenger Series
- Men's tour – Series I
- Hosts: Chile; Uruguay
- Date: 15–23 February 2020
- Nations: 16

Final positions
- Champions: Japan (1st title)
- Runners-up: Hong Kong
- Third: Germany

The 2020 Challenger Series for men's rugby sevens teams was the inaugural season of the second-tier circuit with promotion to the first-tier World Rugby Sevens Series.

The men's tour had sixteen national teams competing and included two Challenger Series events, played in Chile and Uruguay. A final 8-team knockout event had been planned as part of the Hong Kong Sevens tournament to decide the overall winner, but this was postponed and eventually cancelled by World Rugby due to the COVID-19 pandemic.

Japan, as the top-placed team on the standings after the two completed events, was awarded the Challenger Series title and promoted to the World Rugby Sevens Series as a core team for the 2020–21 season.

== Teams ==
There were 16 men's national teams competing in the Challenger Series for 2020.

Nation	Means of qualification	Date qualified
Chile Uruguay	2019 Sudamérica Rugby Sevens	13 January
Brazil	2019 Sudamérica Olympic Qualifier	30 June
Jamaica	2019 RAN Sevens	7 July
Germany Portugal Italy	2019 Rugby Europe Sevens Grand Prix Series	20 July
Japan Hong Kong	2019 Asia Rugby Sevens Series	29 September
Tonga Papua New Guinea	2019 Oceania Sevens Championship	9 November
Uganda Zimbabwe	2019 Africa Men's Sevens	9 November
Mexico Colombia Paraguay	Invited teams	–
Total		16

== Tour venues ==
The official schedule for the 2020 World Rugby Sevens Challenger Series was:

2020 Tour Venues
Host	Stadium	City	Dates	Winner
Chile	Estadio Sausalito	Viña del Mar	15–16 February	Germany
Uruguay	Estadio Charrúa	Montevideo	22–23 February	Japan
Hong Kong	Hong Kong Stadium	Hong Kong	Cancelled	N/A

The final qualifying event at the Hong Kong Sevens was originally scheduled to be played in April 2020 but was postponed and eventually cancelled due to the COVID-19 pandemic.

== Standings ==
The official standings for the 2020 Challenger Series are presented in the table below.

2020 World Rugby Sevens Challenger Series – Series I
Pos	Event Team	Viña del Mar	Montevideo	Points total
1	Japan	17	22	39
2	Hong Kong	19	17	36
3	Germany	22	13	35
4	Chile	15	15	30
5	Uruguay	8	19	27
6	Tonga	13	11	24
7	Uganda	11	8	19 (Note: Tie-breaker margin of points scored for and against in all matches: Uganda +64. Zimbabwe –16.)
8	Zimbabwe	12	7	19
9	Italy	6	12	18
10	Jamaica	7	10	17
11	Papua New Guinea	10	6	16
12	Portugal	5	4	9 (Note: Tie-breaker margin of points scored for and against in all matches: Portugal –31, Colombia –135.)
13	Colombia	4	5	9
14	Mexico	1	3	4 (Note: Tie-breaker margin of points scored for and against in all matches: Mexico –133, Brazil –168, Paraguay –317.)
15	Brazil	2	2	4
16	Paraguay	3	1	4

Source: World Rugby

Legend
Green	Promoted to the 2020–21 World Rugby Sevens Series
Yellow	Invited team

== Viña del Mar ==
The first event was held in Chile, hosted at Estadio Sausalito in Viña Del Mar on 15–16 February 2020. Germany won the tournament, defeating Hong Kong by 10–0 in the final, to take the maximum 22 points in the series standings leading into the second event at Montevideo.

All times are CLST, Chile Summer Time: (UTC-3).

Key: Team advanced to the quarterfinals

=== Pool A ===
Team	W	D	L	PF	PA	PD	Pts
Japan	3	0	0	90	19	+71	9
Tonga	2	0	1	43	45	−2	7
Uruguay	1	0	2	51	34	+17	5
Portugal	0	0	3	19	105	−86	3

Match 5	15 February 2020	Tonga	26–12	Portugal	Estadio Sausalito
	12:31		Report

Match 6	15 February 2020	Japan	17–12	Uruguay	Estadio Sausalito
	12:53		Report

Match 13	15 February 2020	Tonga	10–0	Uruguay	Estadio Sausalito
	15:37		Report

Match 14	15 February 2020	Japan	40–0	Portugal	Estadio Sausalito
	15:59		Report

Match 21	15 February 2020	Portugal	7–39	Uruguay	Estadio Sausalito
	19:08		Report

Match 22	15 February 2020	Japan	33–7	Tonga	Estadio Sausalito
	19:35		Report

=== Pool B ===
Team	W	D	L	PF	PA	PD	Pts
Hong Kong	3	0	0	76	7	+69	9
Papua New Guinea	2	0	1	34	63	−29	7
Jamaica	1	0	2	43	31	+12	5
Colombia	0	0	3	22	74	−52	3

Match 3	15 February 2020	Jamaica	10–12	Papua New Guinea	Estadio Sausalito
	11:47		Report

Match 4	15 February 2020	Hong Kong	26–0	Colombia	Estadio Sausalito
	12:09		Report

Match 11	15 February 2020	Jamaica	26–5	Colombia	Estadio Sausalito
	14:53		Report

Match 12	15 February 2020	Hong Kong	36–0	Papua New Guinea	Estadio Sausalito
	15:15		Report

Match 19	15 February 2020	Papua New Guinea	22–17	Colombia	Estadio Sausalito
	18:09		Report

Match 20	15 February 2020	Hong Kong	14–7	Jamaica	Estadio Sausalito
	18:31		Report

=== Pool C ===
Team	W	D	L	PF	PA	PD	Pts
Germany	3	0	0	91	29	+62	9
Uganda	2	0	1	83	33	+50	7
Italy	1	0	2	76	63	+13	5
Paraguay	0	0	3	15	140	−125	3

Match 1	15 February 2020	Uganda	24–14	Italy	Estadio Sausalito
	11:03		Report

Match 2	15 February 2020	Germany	48–0	Paraguay	Estadio Sausalito
	11:25		Report

Match 9	15 February 2020	Uganda	47–0	Paraguay	Estadio Sausalito
	14:09		Report

Match 10	15 February 2020	Germany	24–17	Italy	Estadio Sausalito
	14:31		Report

Match 17	15 February 2020	Italy	45–15	Paraguay	Estadio Sausalito
	17:25		Report

Match 18	15 February 2020	Germany	19–12	Uganda	Estadio Sausalito
	17:47		Report

=== Pool D ===
Team	W	D	L	PF	PA	PD	Pts
Chile	3	0	0	112	26	+86	9
Zimbabwe	2	0	1	64	53	+11	7
Mexico	1	0	2	34	79	−45	5
Brazil	0	0	3	31	83	−52	3

Match 7	15 February 2020	Zimbabwe	21–14	Brazil	Estadio Sausalito
	13:15		Report

Match 8	15 February 2020	Chile	45–0	Mexico	Estadio Sausalito
	13:37		Report

Match 15	15 February 2020	Zimbabwe	24–15	Mexico	Estadio Sausalito
	16:21		Report

Match 16	15 February 2020	Chile	43–7	Brazil	Estadio Sausalito
	16:43		Report

Match 23	15 February 2020	Brazil	10–19	Mexico	Estadio Sausalito
	20:02		Report

Match 24	15 February 2020	Chile	24–19	Zimbabwe	Estadio Sausalito
	20:30		Report

=== Lower playoffs ===
==== 13th place ====
13th place semifinals
16 February – 15:57 – Estadio Sausalito
Brazil	19
Colombia	22
16 February – 16:20 – Estadio Sausalito
Mexico	14
Paraguay	19

13th place final
16 February – 19:11 – Estadio Sausalito
Colombia	17
Paraguay	14

Matches

13th place semifinals

Match 33	16 February 2020	Brazil	19–22	Colombia	Estadio Sausalito
	15:57		Report

Match 34	16 February 2020	Mexico	14–19	Paraguay	Estadio Sausalito
	16:20		Report

13th place final

Match 41	16 February 2020	Colombia	17–14	Paraguay	Estadio Sausalito
	19:11		Report

==== 9th place ====
9th place quarterfinals
16 February – 12:33 – Estadio Sausalito
Uruguay	19
Brazil	5
16 February – 12:56 – Estadio Sausalito
Italy	47
Colombia	19
16 February – 13:19 – Estadio Sausalito
Mexico	10
Portugal	30
16 February – 13:42 – Estadio Sausalito
Jamaica	33
Paraguay	17

9th place semifinals
16 February – 16:43 – Estadio Sausalito
Uruguay	29
Italy	0
16 February – 17:06 – Estadio Sausalito
Portugal	19
Jamaica	22

9th place final
16 February – 20:03 – Estadio Sausalito
Uruguay	33
Jamaica	0

Matches

9th place quarterfinals

Match 25	15 February 2020	Uruguay	19–5	Brazil	Estadio Sausalito
	12:33		Report

Match 26	16 February 2020	Italy	47–19	Colombia	Estadio Sausalito
	12:56		Report

Match 27	16 February 2020	Mexico	10–30	Portugal	Estadio Sausalito
	13:19		Report

Match 28	16 February 2020	Jamaica	33–17	Paraguay	Estadio Sausalito
	13:42		Report

9th place semifinals

Match 35	16 February 2020	Uruguay	29–0	Italy	Estadio Sausalito
	16:43		Report

Match 36	16 February 2020	Portugal	19–22	Jamaica	Estadio Sausalito
	17:06		Report

9th place final

Match 42	16 February 2020	Uruguay	33–0	Jamaica	Estadio Sausalito
	20:03		Report

=== Title playoffs ===
==== 5th place ====
5th place semifinals
16 February – 17:39 – Estadio Sausalito
Zimbabwe	26
Papua New Guinea	19
16 February – 18:02 – Estadio Sausalito
Tonga	19
Uganda	14

5th place final
16 February – 20:28 – Estadio Sausalito
Zimbabwe	14
Tonga	19

Matches

5th place semifinals

Match 37	16 February 2020	Zimbabwe	26–19	Papua New Guinea	Estadio Sausalito
	17:39		Report

Match 38	16 February 2020	Tonga	19–14	Uganda	Estadio Sausalito
	18:02		Report

5th place final

Match 43	16 February 2020	Zimbabwe	14–19	Tonga	Estadio Sausalito
	20:28		Report

==== Cup ====
Quarterfinals
16 February – 14:15 – Estadio Sausalito
Japan	33
Zimbabwe	0
16 February – 14:38 – Estadio Sausalito
Germany	29
Papua New Guinea	0
16 February – 15:01 – Estadio Sausalito
Chile	28
Tonga	7
16 February – 15:24 – Estadio Sausalito
Hong Kong	10
Uganda	7

Semifinals
16 February – 18:25 – Estadio Sausalito
Japan	5
Germany	12
16 February – 18:48 – Estadio Sausalito
Chile	14
Hong Kong	17

Final
16 February – 21:23 – Estadio Sausalito
Germany	10
Hong Kong	0
3rd place final
16 February – 20:54 – Estadio Sausalito
Japan	31
Chile	14

Matches

Quarterfinals

Match 29	16 February 2020	Japan	33–0	Zimbabwe	Estadio Sausalito
	14:15		Report

Match 30	16 February 2020	Germany	29–0	Papua New Guinea	Estadio Sausalito
	14:38		Report

Match 31	16 February 2020	Chile	28–7	Tonga	Estadio Sausalito
	15:01		Report

Match 32	16 February 2020	Hong Kong	10–7	Uganda	Estadio Sausalito
	15:24		Report

Semifinals

Match 39	16 February 2020	Japan	5–12	Germany	Estadio Sausalito
	18:25		Report

Match 40	16 February 2020	Chile	14–17	Hong Kong	Estadio Sausalito
	18:48		Report

3rd place final

Match 44	16 February 2020	Japan	31–14	Chile	Estadio Sausalito
	20:54		Report

Final

Match 45	16 February 2020	Germany	10–0	Hong Kong	Estadio Sausalito
	21:23		Report

=== Placings ===
Place	Team	Points
1	Germany	22
2	Hong Kong	19
3	Japan	17
4	Chile	15
5	Tonga	13
6	Zimbabwe	12
7	Uganda	11
8	Papua New Guinea	10

Place	Team	Points
9	Uruguay	8
10	Jamaica	7
11	Italy	6
12	Portugal	5
13	Colombia	4
14	Paraguay	3
15	Brazil	2
16	Mexico	1

Source: portaldorugby

== Montevideo ==
The men's tour traveled to Uruguay for the second leg. The Seven Punta tournament, the nation's premier international rugby sevens event, served as the Challenge Series contest. Played since 1989 at the resort city of Punta del Este, the tournament was relocated for the first time to Montevideo for the 2020 edition but kept the Seven Punta name. It was held at Estadio Charrua on 22–23 February 2020. Japan won the tournament, defeating the host nation Uruguay in the final by 5–0 in extra time.

All times are UYT, Uruguay Time: (UTC-3).

Key: Team advanced to the quarterfinals

=== Pool A ===
Team	W	D	L	PF	PA	PD	Pts
Germany	3	0	0	88	27	+61	9
Uruguay	2	0	1	70	41	+29	7
Mexico	1	0	2	29	84	−55	5
Papua New Guinea	0	0	3	32	67	−35	3

Match 7	22 February 2020	Papua New Guinea	10–26	Uruguay	Estadio Charrua
	13:15		Report

Match 8	22 February 2020	Germany	38–7	Mexico	Estadio Charrua
	13:37		Report

Match 15	22 February 2020	Papua New Guinea	12–17	Mexico	Estadio Charrua
	16:41		Report

Match 16	22 February 2020	Germany	26–10	Uruguay	Estadio Charrua
	17:03		Report

Match 23	22 February 2020	Uruguay	34–5	Mexico	Estadio Charrua
	20:12		Report

Match 24	22 February 2020	Germany	24–10	Papua New Guinea	Estadio Charrua
	20:40		Report

=== Pool B ===
Team	W	D	L	PF	PA	PD	Pts
Hong Kong	3	0	0	110	24	+86	9
Jamaica	2	0	1	55	41	+14	7
Uganda	1	0	2	31	60	−29	5
Brazil	0	0	3	27	98	−71	3

Match 5	22 February 2020	Uganda	0–10	Jamaica	Estadio Charrua
	12:31		Report

Match 6	22 February 2020	Hong Kong	41–5	Brazil	Estadio Charrua
	12:53		Report

Match 13	22 February 2020	Uganda	19–12	Brazil	Estadio Charrua
	15:57		Report

Match 14	22 February 2020	Hong Kong	31–7	Jamaica	Estadio Charrua
	16:19		Report

Match 21	22 February 2020	Jamaica	38–10	Brazil	Estadio Charrua
	19:18		Report

Match 22	22 February 2020	Hong Kong	38–12	Uganda	Estadio Charrua
	19:45		Report

=== Pool C ===
Team	W	D	L	PF	PA	PD	Pts
Japan	3	0	0	123	29	+94	9
Italy	2	0	1	94	57	+37	7
Zimbabwe	1	0	2	55	73	−18	5
Paraguay	0	0	3	36	149	−113	3

Match 3	22 February 2020	Zimbabwe	12–35	Italy	Estadio Charrua
	11:47		Report

Match 4	22 February 2020	Japan	71–5	Paraguay	Estadio Charrua
	12:09		Report

Match 11	22 February 2020	Zimbabwe	31–12	Paraguay	Estadio Charrua
	15:03		Report

Match 12	22 February 2020	Japan	26–12	Italy	Estadio Charrua
	15:25		Report

Match 19	22 February 2020	Italy	47–19	Paraguay	Estadio Charrua
	18:19		Report

Match 20	22 February 2020	Japan	26–12	Zimbabwe	Estadio Charrua
	18:41		Report

=== Pool D ===
Team	W	D	L	PF	PA	PD	Pts
Tonga	3	0	0	73	38	+35	9
Chile	2	0	1	55	39	+16	7
Portugal	1	0	2	48	47	+1	5
Colombia	0	0	3	48	100	−52	3

Match 1	22 February 2020	Tonga	14–7	Portugal	Estadio Charrua
	11:03		Report

Match 2	22 February 2020	Chile	29–10	Colombia	Estadio Charrua
	11:25		Report

Match 9	22 February 2020	Tonga	40–19	Colombia	Estadio Charrua
	14:19		Report

Match 10	22 February 2020	Chile	14–10	Portugal	Estadio Charrua
	14:41		Report

Match 17	22 February 2020	Portugal	31–19	Colombia	Estadio Charrua
	17:35		Report

Match 18	22 February 2020	Chile	12–19	Tonga	Estadio Charrua
	17:57		Report

=== Lower playoffs ===
==== 13th place ====
13th place semifinals
23 February – 14:57 – Estadio Charrua
Mexico	22
Brazil	0
23 February – 15:20 – Estadio Charrua
Portugal	26
Paraguay	10

13th place final
23 February – 18:11 – Estadio Charrua
Mexico	7
Portugal	30

Matches

13th place semifinals

Match 33	23 February 2020	Mexico	22–0	Brazil	Estadio Charrua
	14:57		Report

Match 34	23 February 2020	Portugal	26–10	Paraguay	Estadio Charrua
	15:20		Report

13th place final

Match 41	23 February 2020	Mexico	7–30	Portugal	Estadio Charrua
	18:11		Report

==== 9th place ====
9th place quarterfinals
23 February – 11:33 – Estadio Charrua
Mexico	17
Colombia	24
23 February – 11:56 – Estadio Charrua
Zimbabwe	21
Brazil	15
23 February – 12:19 – Estadio Charrua
Portugal	17
Papua New Guinea	19
23 February – 12:42 – Estadio Charrua
Uganda	56
Paraguay	7

9th place semifinals
23 February – 15:43 – Estadio Charrua
Colombia	17
Zimbabwe	33
23 February – 16:06 – Estadio Charrua
Papua New Guinea	19
Uganda	22

9th place final
23 February – 19:03 – Estadio Charrua
Zimbabwe	24
Uganda	26

Matches

9th place quarterfinals

Match 25	23 February 2020	Mexico	17–24	Colombia	Estadio Charrua
	11:33		Report

Match 26	23 February 2020	Zimbabwe	21–15	Brazil	Estadio Charrua
	11:56		Report

Match 27	23 February 2020	Portugal	17–19	Papua New Guinea	Estadio Charrua
	12:19		Report

Match 28	23 February 2020	Uganda	56–7	Paraguay	Estadio Charrua
	12:42		Report

9th place semifinals

Match 35	23 February 2020	Colombia	17–33	Zimbabwe	Estadio Charrua
	15:43		Report

Match 36	23 February 2020	Papua New Guinea	19–22	Uganda	Estadio Charrua
	16:06		Report

9th place final

Match 42	23 February 2020	Zimbabwe	24–26	Uganda	Estadio Charrua
	19:03		Report

=== Title playoffs ===
==== 5th place ====
5th place semifinals
16 February – 16:39 – Estadio Sausalito
Germany	40
Jamaica	5
23 February – 17:02 – Estadio Charrua
Tonga	15
Italy	26

5th place final
23 February – 19:28 – Estadio Charrua
Germany	19
Italy	10

Matches

5th place semifinals

Match 37	23 February 2020	Germany	40–5	Jamaica	Estadio Charrua
	17:39		Report

Match 38	23 February 2020	Tonga	15–26	Italy	Estadio Charrua
	18:02		Report

5th place final

Match 43	23 February 2020	Germany	19–10	Italy	Estadio Charrua
	19:28		Report

==== Cup ====
Quarterfinals
23 February – 13:15 – Estadio Charrua
Germany	12
Chile	17
23 February – 13:38 – Estadio Charrua
Japan	32
Jamaica	0
23 February – 14:01 – Estadio Charrua
Tonga	7
Uruguay	27
23 February – 14:24 – Estadio Charrua
Hong Kong	17
Italy	12

Semifinals
23 February – 17:25 – Estadio Charrua
Chile	10
Japan	31
23 February – 17:48 – Estadio Charrua
Uruguay	12
Hong Kong	0

Final
23 February – 20:23 – Estadio Charrua
Japan	^{5}_{^{(a.e.t.)}}
Uruguay	0
3rd place final
23 February – 19:54 – Estadio Charrua
Chile	7
Hong Kong	12

Matches

Quarterfinals

Match 29	23 February 2020	Germany	12–17	Chile	Estadio Charrua
	13:15		Report

Match 30	23 February 2020	Japan	32–0	Jamaica	Estadio Charrua
	13:38		Report

Match 31	23 February 2020	Tonga	7–27	Uruguay	Estadio Charrua
	14:01		Report

Match 32	23 February 2020	Hong Kong	17–12	Italy	Estadio Charrua
	14:24		Report

Semifinals

Match 39	23 February 2020	Chile	10–31	Japan	Estadio Charrua
	17:25		Report

Match 40	23 February 2020	Uruguay	12–0	Hong Kong	Estadio Charrua
	17:48		Report

3rd place final

Match 44	23 February 2020	Chile	7–12	Hong Kong	Estadio Charrua
	19:54		Report

Final

Match 45	23 February 2020	Japan	5–0^{(a.e.t.)}	Uruguay	Estadio Charrua
	20:23		Report

=== Placings ===
Place	Team	Points
1	Japan	22
2	Uruguay	19
3	Hong Kong	17
4	Chile	15
5	Germany	13
6	Italy	12
7	Tonga	11
8	Jamaica	10

Place	Team	Points
9	Uganda	8
10	Zimbabwe	7
11	Papua New Guinea	6
12	Colombia	5
13	Portugal	4
14	Mexico	3
15	Brazil	2
16	Paraguay	1

== See also ==
- 2020 World Rugby Sevens Challenger Series – Women's tour
