= 2022 Rugby World Cup Sevens European Qualifier =

Rugby sevens tournament

- Hosts: Romania
- Date: 16 July – 17 July 2022
- Nations: 12

Final positions
- Champions: Round-robin and one-match play-off (Note: The event was a qualification event for the 2022 Rugby World Cup Sevens. The knockout stage only featured as a one-match play-off between seeded teams.)

The 2022 Rugby World Cup Sevens European Qualifier was the final qualification event for the 2022 Rugby World Cup Sevens. Four teams qualified from the 12 teams entered. The event was held at the Stadionul Arcul de Triumf in Bucharest. Ireland were strong favourites entering the tournament and qualified for 2022 event, by defeating Georgia 17–12 in their quarter-final matchup.

== Teams ==
- Belgium
- Czech Republic
- Georgia
- Germany (Q)
- Ireland (Q)
- Italy
- Lithuania
- Poland
- Portugal (Q)
- Romania
- Spain
- Wales (Q)

Teams marked with (Q) qualified for 2022 Rugby World Cup Sevens.

== Event ==
All times are in Eastern European Summer Time.

=== Pool stage ===
==== Pool A ====
Team	Pld	W	D	L	PF	PA	PD	Pts
Ireland	3	3	0	0	123	5	+118	9
Italy	3	2	0	1	40	36	+4	7
Portugal	3	1	0	2	56	43	+13	5
Poland	3	0	0	3	10	145	−135	3

16 July 2022
13:58

Italy	14–5	Portugal
	Report

Stadionul Arcul de Triumf, Bucharest

16 July 2022
14:20

Ireland	73–0	Poland
	Report

Stadionul Arcul de Triumf, Bucharest

16 July 2022
20:58

Italy	21–10	Poland
	Report

Stadionul Arcul de Triumf, Bucharest

16 July 2022
21:20

Ireland	29–0	Portugal
	Report

Stadionul Arcul de Triumf, Bucharest

17 July 2022
13:58

Portugal	51–0	Poland
	Report

Stadionul Arcul de Triumf, Bucharest

17 July 2022
14:20

Ireland	21–5	Italy
	Report

Stadionul Arcul de Triumf, Bucharest

==== Pool B ====
Team	Pld	W	D	L	PF	PA	PD	Pts
Spain	3	3	0	0	123	22	+101	9
Belgium	3	2	0	1	78	29	+49	7
Czech Republic	3	1	0	2	25	114	−89	5
Lithuania	3	0	0	3	20	81	−61	3

16 July 2022
13:14

Belgium	17–0	Lithuania
	Report

Stadionul Arcul de Triumf, Bucharest

16 July 2022
13:36

Spain	50–5	Czech Republic
	Report

Stadionul Arcul de Triumf, Bucharest

16 July 2022
19:52

Belgium	54–5	Czech Republic
	Report

Stadionul Arcul de Triumf, Bucharest

16 July 2022
20:36

Spain	49–10	Lithuania
	Report

Stadionul Arcul de Triumf, Bucharest

17 July 2022
13:14

Lithuania	10–15	Czech Republic
	Report

Stadionul Arcul de Triumf, Bucharest

17 July 2022
13:36

Spain	24–7	Belgium
	Report

Stadionul Arcul de Triumf, Bucharest

==== Pool C ====
Team	Pld	W	D	L	PF	PA	PD	Pts
Germany	3	3	0	0	90	17	+73	9
Wales	3	2	0	1	88	26	+62	7
Georgia	3	1	0	2	36	66	−30	5
Romania	3	0	0	3	7	112	−105	3

16 July 2022
12:30

Germany	26–7	Georgia
	Report

Stadionul Arcul de Triumf, Bucharest

16 July 2022
12:52

Wales	45–0	Romania
	Report

Stadionul Arcul de Triumf, Bucharest

16 July 2022
19:30

Germany	52–0	Romania
	Report

Stadionul Arcul de Triumf, Bucharest

16 July 2022
20:14

Wales	33–14	Georgia
	Report

Stadionul Arcul de Triumf, Bucharest

17 July 2022
12:30

Georgia	15–7	Romania
	Report

Stadionul Arcul de Triumf, Bucharest

17 July 2022
12:52

Wales	10–12	Germany
	Report

Stadionul Arcul de Triumf, Bucharest

=== Seeds ===
The final seeding procedure, to determine the four teams that would play-off, saw 1 v 8, 2 v 7, 3 v 6, and 4 v 5:

Seed	Team	Pld	W	D	L	PF	PA	PD	Pts
1	Ireland (Q)	3	3	0	0	123	5	+118	9
2	Spain	3	3	0	0	123	22	+101	9
3	Germany (Q)	3	3	0	0	90	17	+73	9
4	Wales (Q)	3	2	0	1	88	26	+62	7
5	Belgium	3	2	0	1	78	29	+49	7
6	Italy	3	2	0	1	40	36	+4	7
7	Portugal (Q)	3	1	0	2	56	43	+13	5
8	Georgia	3	1	0	2	36	66	−30	5
9	Czech Republic	3	1	0	2	25	114	−89	5
10	Lithuania	3	0	0	3	20	81	−61	3
11	Romania	3	0	0	3	7	112	−105	3
12	Poland	3	0	0	3	10	145	−135	3

(Q) Qualified for the phase indicated

== Knockout play-offs ==
Winners of the four matches advance to 2022 Rugby World Cup Sevens.

17 July 2022
18:30

(4) Wales	24–12	Belgium (5)
	Report

Stadionul Arcul de Triumf, Bucharest

17 July 2022
18:52

(3) Germany	24–7	Italy (6)
	Report

Stadionul Arcul de Triumf, Bucharest

17 July 2022
19:14

(2) Spain	19–20	Portugal (7)
	Report

Stadionul Arcul de Triumf, Bucharest

17 July 2022
19:36

(1) Ireland	17–12	Georgia (8)
	Report

Stadionul Arcul de Triumf, Bucharest
