= World Rugby Sevens Challenger Series =

Annual series of international rugby sevens tournaments

World Rugby Sevens Challenger
- Current seasons
- ^{2025 Men's Series}_{2025 Women's Series}
- Sport: Rugby sevens
- First season: 2020; 6 years ago
- Replaced by: 2025; 1 year ago by SVNS 2 and SVNS 3
- No. of teams: 12 (men's); 12 (women's)
- Most recent champions: Portugal (2025 Men); Kenya (2025 Women)
- Most titles: Men; Uruguay (2 titles); Women; China (1 title); Japan (1 title); South Africa (1 title); Kenya (1 title)
- Level on pyramid: 2
- Promotion to: SVNS (men's); SVNS (women's)

The World Rugby Sevens Challenger (formerly the World Rugby Sevens Challenger Series) is an annual series of rugby sevens tournaments for national teams run by World Rugby that includes men's and women's events. Sponsored by banking group HSBC, it is the second tier of competition below the SVNS. Teams on the respective men's and women's tours of the Challenger Series compete for promotion to the first tier as a core team.

The inaugural men's tour for the Challenger Series in 2020 featured events in Chile and Uruguay. Due to the COVID-19 pandemic, World Rugby postponed the final event in Hong Kong until October 2020.

The women's tournament for the Challenger Series in the 2020 season was announced as a stand-alone event hosted in South Africa. On 13 March 2020, due to the COVID-19 pandemic, World Rugby postponed the Challenger Series women's event without rescheduling a future date. Subsequently, as a result of the COVID-19 pandemic, Japan was awarded promotion to the Men's World Rugby Sevens Series as the overall points leader in the Challenger Series. However, no women's team was promoted.

In 2025, following the restructuring of the SVNS Series, the Challenger Series was replaced by SVNS 2 and SVNS 3.

== Teams ==
The 12 men's teams and 12 women's teams expected to compete at the 2025 Challenger Series.

=== Men's teams ===
- Chile
- Georgia
- Germany
- Hong Kong
- Japan
- Canada
- Brazil
- Samoa
- Portugal
- Tonga
- Uganda
- Madagascar

=== Women's teams ===
- Argentina
- Belgium
- Colombia
- Czech Republic
- Hong Kong
- Kenya
- Mexico
- Samoa
- South Africa
- Poland
- Thailand
- Uganda

== Seasons ==
2020 logo

=== 2020 ===
The first season of the challenger series was impacted by the COVID-19 pandemic with the 2020 women's tour to South Africa being cancelled altogether and the men's final knock-out event planned for Hong Kong also cancelled.

The 2020 men's tour was played over two rounds hosted in Chile and Uruguay. Japan, as the top-placed team on the standings after the two completed events, was awarded the Challenger Series title and promoted to the World Rugby Sevens Series as a core team for the 2020–21 season.

=== 2022 ===
The second season of the Challenger Series was played as a single tournament on 12–14 August 2022 in Santiago, Chile at the Estadio Santa Laura, with the men's and women's winners gaining promotion as core teams on the World Rugby Sevens Series for the 2022–23 season.

=== 2023 ===
The third season of the Challenger Series was played over two rounds on 20–22 and 28–30 April in Stellenbosch, South Africa, with the men's winners gaining qualification to the 2023 core team qualifier event in London and the women's winners gaining qualification as a core team on the World Rugby Sevens Series for the 2023–24 season.

=== 2024 ===
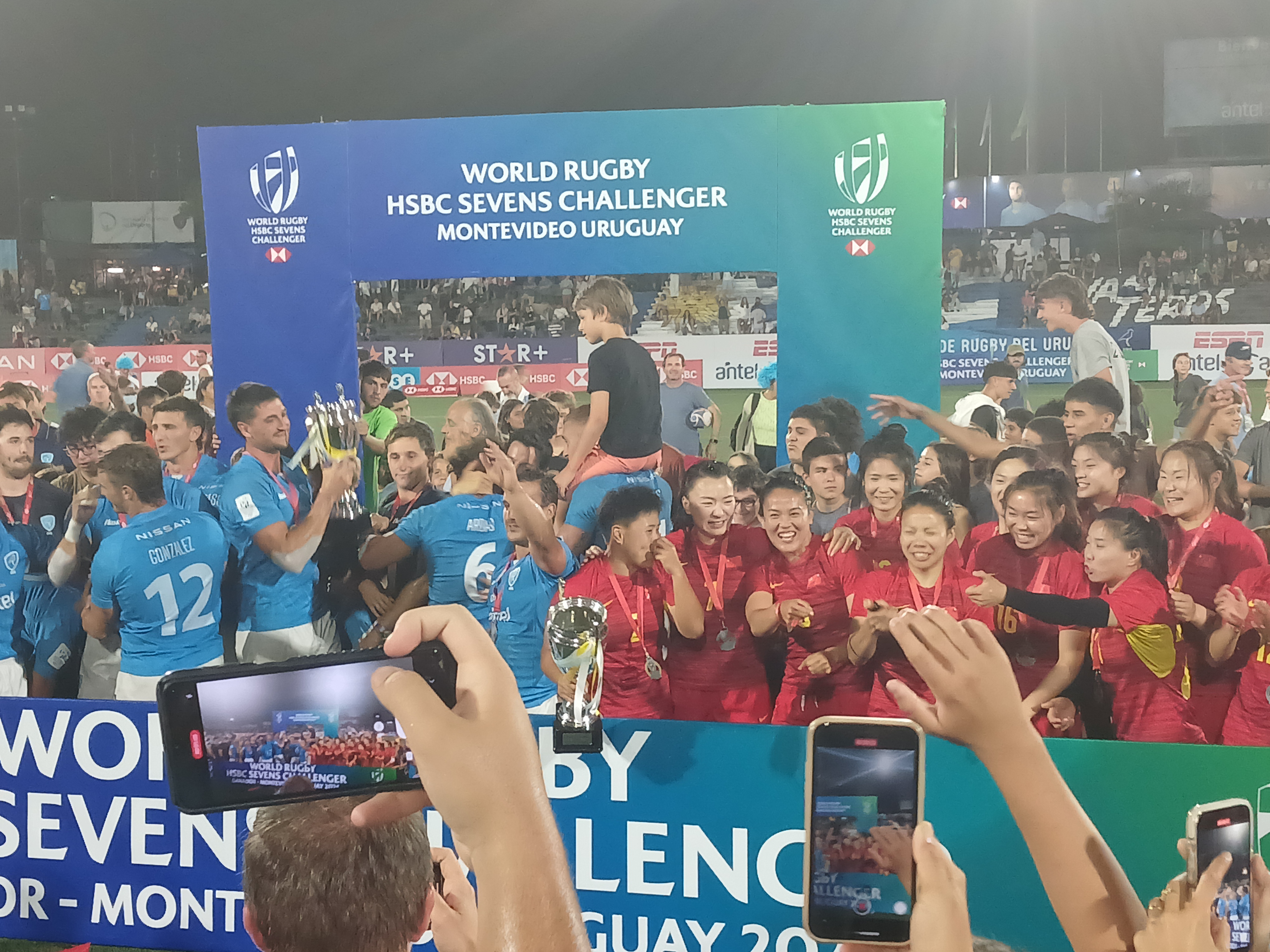
Uruguay men's team and China women's team celebrating at the Sevens Challenger Montevideo

The fourth season of the Challenger Series will be played over three rounds on 12–14 January in Dubai, UAE, 8–10 March in Montevideo, Uruguay, 18–19 May in Kraków, Poland (women), and 18–19 May in Munich, Germany (men). The top four placed men's and women's teams, based on cumulative series points at the conclusion of the third round, will secure their opportunity to compete in the promotion and relegation play-off competition at the SVNS Grand Final in Madrid on 31 May – 2 June against the teams ranked ninth to 12th from 2023–24 SVNS.

== Historical results ==
=== Results by season – Men ===
Summary of the top six placegetters for each series:

Series	Season	Rds	Champion	Second	Third	Fourth	Fifth	Sixth	Ref
I	2020	2	Japan	Hong Kong	Germany	Chile	Uruguay	Tonga	
II	2022	1	Uruguay	Georgia	Chile	Germany	Hong Kong	Uganda	
III	2023	2	Tonga	Belgium	Germany	Hong Kong	Chile	Uganda	
IV	2024	3	Uruguay	Kenya	Chile	Germany	Hong Kong	Uganda	
V	2025	3	Portugal	Germany	Canada	Samoa	Chile	Madagascar	

=== Participation history – Men ===
Team	2020	2022	2023	2024	2025
Belgium	NQ		2nd	NQ	
Brazil	15th	NQ	8th	NQ	12th
Canada	SVNS				3rd
Chile	4th	3rd	5th	3rd	5th
Colombia	13th	NQ			
Georgia	NQ	2nd	NQ	9th	10th
Germany	3rd	4th	3rd	4th	2nd
Hong Kong	2nd	5th	4th	5th	11th
Italy	9th	NQ	7th	NQ	
Jamaica	10th		12th	NQ	
Japan	1st	SVNS		8th	7th
Kenya	SVNS			2nd	SVNS
Lithuania	NQ	9th	NQ		
Madagascar	NQ				6th
Mexico	14th	NQ		12th	NQ
Papua New Guinea	11th		9th	11th	NQ
Paraguay	16th	NQ			
Portugal	12th	NQ		10th	1st
Samoa	SVNS				4th
South Korea	NQ	12th	11th	NQ	
Tonga	6th	7th	1st	7th	8th
Uganda	7th	6th			9th
Uruguay	5th	1st	SVNS	1st	SVNS
Zimbabwe	8th		10th	NQ	

=== Results by season – Women ===
Summary of the top six placegetters for each series:

Series	Season	Rds	Champion	Second	Third	Fourth	Fifth	Sixth	Ref
—N/a	2020	Cancelled							
I	2022	1	Japan	Poland	China	Kenya	Kazakhstan	Belgium	
II	2023	2	South Africa	Belgium	China	Poland	Czech Republic	Thailand	
III	2024	3	China	Argentina	Belgium	Poland	Kenya	Uganda	
IV	2025	3	Kenya	South Africa	Argentina	Colombia	Thailand	Czech Republic	

=== Participation history – Women ===
Team	~~2020~~	2022	2023	2024	2025
Argentina	Cancelled	7th	NQ	2nd	3rd
Belgium	Cancelled	6th	2nd	3rd	8th
Chile	NQ	10th	NQ		
China	Cancelled	3rd		1st	SVNS
Colombia	Cancelled	8th	7th	NQ	4th
Czech Republic	NQ		5th	8th	6th
Hong Kong	NQ		8th	9th	10th
Japan	Cancelled	1st	SVNS		
Kazakhstan	Cancelled	5th	NQ		
Kenya	Cancelled	4th	NQ	5th	1st
Madagascar	NQ		9th	NQ	
Mexico	Cancelled	12th	11th	12th	12th
Papua New Guinea	Cancelled	11th	12th	11th	NQ
Paraguay	NQ		10th		NQ
Poland	Cancelled	2nd	4th		7th
Samoa	NQ				11th
Scotland	Cancelled	NQ	SVNS as Great Britain		
South Africa	Cancelled	9th	1st	SVNS	2nd
Thailand	NQ		6th	7th	5th
Uganda	NQ			6th	9th
