= 2024 World Rugby Sevens Challenger Series – Men's tour =

Rugby sevens competition

2024 World Rugby Sevens Challenger Series
- Men's tour – Series IV
- Hosts: United Arab Emirates; Uruguay; Germany
- Date: 12 January–19 May 2024
- Nations: 12

Final positions
- Champions: Uruguay
- Runners-up: Kenya
- Third: Chile

Team changes
- Promoted: Uruguay; Kenya

The 2024 World Rugby Sevens Challenger Series for men's rugby sevens teams was the fourth season of the second-tier World Rugby Sevens Challenger Series that allowed a promotion pathway to the top-level SVNS.

The women's challenger tour had 12 national teams competing and was played as three tournaments in Dubai, Montevideo and Munich. The top four team gained entry to the 2024 Spain Sevens core team qualifier.

== Teams ==
There are 12 men's national teams competing in the Challenger Series for 2024.

Date qualified	Means of qualification	Nation
18 June 2023	2023 Sudamérica Rugby Sevens	Uruguay
18 June 2023	2023 Sudamérica Rugby Sevens	Chile
9 July 2023	2023 Rugby Europe Sevens Championship Series	Georgia
9 July 2023	2023 Rugby Europe Sevens Championship Series	Portugal
9 July 2023	2023 Rugby Europe Sevens Championship Series	Germany
20 August 2023	2023 RAN Sevens	Mexico
17 September 2023	2023 Africa Men's Sevens	Kenya
17 September 2023	2023 Africa Men's Sevens	Uganda
15 October 2023	2023 Asia Rugby Sevens Series	Hong Kong
15 October 2023	2023 Asia Rugby Sevens Series	Japan
12 November 2023	2023 Oceania Sevens Championship	Papua New Guinea
12 November 2023	2023 Oceania Sevens Championship	Tonga
Totals	6	12

== Schedule ==
The official schedule for the 2024 World Rugby Sevens Challenger Series is:

2024 Itinerary
Leg	City	Stadium	Dates	Winner
1	Dubai	The Sevens Stadium	12–14 January	Kenya
2	Montevideo	Estadio Charrúa	8–10 March	Uruguay
3	Munich	Dantestadion	18–19 May	Uruguay

== Standings ==
2024 World Rugby Sevens Challenger – Men's Series IV
Pos.	Event Team	Dubai	Montevideo	Munich	Points total
1	Uruguay	16	20	20	56
2	Kenya	20	16	12	48
3	Chile	18	14	14	46
4	Germany	14	12	18	44
5	Hong Kong	8	18	16	42
6	Uganda	4	10	10	24
7	Tonga	10	8	6	24
8	Georgia	6	4	8	18
9	Japan	12	3	3	18
10	Portugal	3	6	4	13
11	Papua New Guinea	2	2	2	6
12	Mexico	1	1	1	3

Legend
Green	Qualified for Core Team Qualifier

== Dubai ==
=== Pool stage ===
The first event of the series will take place at The Sevens Stadium in Dubai, United Arab Emirates.

==== Pool A ====
Team	P	W	D	L	PF	PA	PD	BP	Pts
Uruguay	3	2	0	1	84	26	+58	1	7
Hong Kong	3	2	0	1	40	47	–7	0	6
Georgia	3	2	0	1	38	39	–1	0	6
Papua New Guinea	3	0	0	3	31	81	–50	0	0

12 January
15:20

Hong Kong	21–7	Papua New Guinea

The Sevens, Dubai

12 January
15:42

Uruguay	10–12	Georgia

The Sevens, Dubai

12 January
20:04

Hong Kong	19–7	Georgia

The Sevens, Dubai

12 January
20:26

Uruguay	41–14	Papua New Guinea

The Sevens, Dubai

13 January
15:05

Papua New Guinea	10–19	Georgia

The Sevens, Dubai

13 January
15:27

Uruguay	33–0	Hong Kong

The Sevens, Dubai

==== Pool B ====
Team	P	W	D	L	PF	PA	PD	BP	Pts
Chile	3	2	0	1	67	40	+27	1	7
Japan	3	2	0	1	55	46	+9	0	6
Tonga	3	2	0	1	57	59	–2	0	6
Portugal	3	0	0	3	38	72	–34	2	2

12 January
14:36

Tonga	26–19	Chile

The Sevens, Dubai

12 January
14:58

Japan	22–17	Portugal

The Sevens, Dubai

12 January
19:20

Tonga	26–21	Portugal

The Sevens, Dubai

12 January
19:42

Japan	14–24	Chile

The Sevens, Dubai

13 January
14:21

Chile	24–0	Portugal

The Sevens, Dubai

13 January
14:43

Japan	19–5	Tonga

The Sevens, Dubai

==== Pool C ====
Team	P	W	D	L	PF	PA	PD	BP	Pts
Germany	3	3	0	0	86	17	+69	0	9
Kenya	3	2	0	1	82	31	+51	0	6
Uganda	3	1	0	2	52	62	–10	0	3
Mexico	3	0	0	3	14	124	–110	0	0

12 January
13:52

Germany	19–5	Uganda

The Sevens, Dubai

12 January
14:14

Kenya	41–0	Mexico

The Sevens, Dubai

12 January
18:36

Germany	43–0	Mexico

The Sevens,, Dubai

12 January
18:58

Kenya	29–7	Uganda

The Sevens, Dubai

13 January
13:37

Uganda	40–14	Mexico

The Sevens, Dubai

13 January
13:59

Kenya	12–24	Germany

The Sevens, Dubai

==== Ranking of third-placed teams ====
Team	P	W	D	L	PF	PA	PD	Pts	BP
Georgia	3	2	0	1	38	39	–1	0	6
Tonga	3	2	0	1	57	59	–2	0	6
Uganda	3	1	0	2	52	62	–10	0	3

=== Play-offs ===
==== 9th to 12th playoffs ====
9th place semifinals
13 January – 18:21 – The Sevens, Dubai
Portugal	22
Papua New Guinea	19
13 January – 18:43 – The Sevens, Dubai
Uganda	50
Mexico	0

9th place final
14 January – 12:21 – The Sevens, Dubai
Portugal	12
Uganda	27
11th place final
14 January – 11:37 – The Sevens, Dubai
Papua New Guinea	47
Mexico	10

==== 5th to 8th playoffs ====
Seventh place

14 January
15:37

Hong Kong	38–0	Georgia

The Sevens, Dubai

Fifth place

14 January
16:09

Japan	28–5	Tonga

The Sevens, Dubai

==== Cup ====
Quarterfinals
13 January – 19:05 – The Sevens, Dubai
Japan	19
Kenya	21
13 January – 19:27 – The Sevens, Dubai
Uruguay	21
Tonga	14
13 January – 19:49 – The Sevens, Dubai
Germany	19
Hong Kong	7
13 January – 20:11 – The Sevens, Dubai
Chile	26
Georgia	7

Semifinals
14 January – 13:37 – The Sevens, Dubai
Kenya	27
Uruguay	5
14 January – 13:59 – The Sevens, Dubai
Germany	7
Chile	15

Final
14 January – 17:33 – The Sevens, Dubai
Kenya	12
Chile	5
3rd place final
14 January – 16:33 – The Sevens, Dubai
Uruguay	12
Germany	7

=== Final placings ===
Place	Team
1st place, gold medalist(s)	Kenya
2nd place, silver medalist(s)	Chile
3rd place, bronze medalist(s)	Uruguay
4	Germany
5	Japan
6	Tonga
7	Hong Kong
8	Georgia
9	Uganda
10	Portugal
11	Papua New Guinea
12	Mexico

== Montevideo ==
=== Pool stage ===
The second event of the series will take place in Montevideo, Uruguay.

==== Pool A ====
Team	P	W	L	PF	PA	PD	Pts
Portugal	3	2	1	67	45	+22	7
Kenya	3	2	1	36	43	–7	6
Tonga	3	1	2	66	39	+27	5
Georgia	3	1	2	36	78	–42	3

8 March
15:20

Tonga	40–5	Georgia

Estadio Charrúa, Montevideo

8 March
15:42

Kenya	19–12	Portugal

Estadio Charrúa, Montevideo

8 March
20:04

Tonga	12–17	Portugal

Estadio Charrúa, Montevideo

8 March
20:26

Kenya	0–17	Georgia

Estadio Charrúa, Montevideo

9 March
15:05

Georgia	14–38	Portugal

Estadio Charrúa, Montevideo

9 March
15:27

Kenya	17–14	Tonga

Estadio Charrúa, Montevideo

==== Pool B ====
Team	P	W	L	PF	PA	PD	Pts
Hong Kong	3	3	0	100	21	+79	9
Chile	3	2	1	74	26	+48	7
Japan	3	1	2	43	80	–37	4
Mexico	3	0	3	26	116	–90	1

8 March
14:36

Japan	7–42	Hong Kong

Estadio Charrúa, Montevideo

8 March
14:58

Chile	48–0	Mexico

Estadio Charrúa, Montevideo

8 March
19:20

Japan	29–26	Mexico

Estadio Charrúa, Montevideo

8 March
19:42

Chile	14–19	Hong Kong

Estadio Charrúa, Montevideo

9 March
14:21

Hong Kong	39–0	Mexico

Estadio Charrúa, Montevideo

9 March
14:43

Chile	12–7	Japan

Estadio Charrúa, Montevideo

==== Pool C ====
Team	P	W	L	PF	PA	PD	Pts
Uganda	3	3	0	65	52	+13	9
Germany	3	2	1	76	36	+40	7
Uruguay	3	1	2	71	66	+5	5
Papua New Guinea	3	0	3	31	89	–58	1

8 March
13:52

Germany	14–17	Uganda

Estadio Charrúa, Montevideo

8 March
14:14

Uruguay	31–14	Papua New Guinea

Estadio Charrúa, Montevideo

8 March
18:36

Germany	36–0	Papua New Guinea

Estadio Charrúa, Montevideo

8 March
14:58

Uruguay	21–26	Uganda

Estadio Charrúa, Montevideo

9 March
13:37

Uganda	22–17	Papua New Guinea

Estadio Charrúa, Montevideo

9 March
13:59

Uruguay	19–26	Germany

Estadio Charrúa, Montevideo

==== Ranking of third-placed teams ====
Team	P	W	L	PF	PA	PD	Pts
Tonga	3	1	2	66	39	+27	5
Uruguay	3	1	2	71	66	+5	5
Japan	3	1	2	43	80	–37	4

=== Play-offs ===
==== 9th to 12th playoffs ====
9th place semifinals
9 March – 18:41 – Estadio Charrúa, Montevideo
Georgia	26
Papua New Guinea	7
9 March – 18:43 – Estadio Charrúa, Montevideo
Japan	44
Mexico	0

9th place final
10 March – 14:21 – Estadio Charrúa, Montevideo
Georgia	17
Japan	12
11th place final
10 March – 13:37 – Estadio Charrúa, Montevideo
Papua New Guinea	47
Mexico	12

==== 5th to 8th playoffs ====
Seventh place

10 March
16:59

Tonga	28–19	Portugal

Estadio Charrúa, Montevideo

Fifth place

10 March
17:43

Germany	10–7	Uganda

Estadio Charrúa, Montevideo

==== Cup ====
Quarterfinals
9 March – 19:05 – Estadio Charrúa, Montevideo
Chile	12
Germany	7
9 March – 19:27 – Estadio Charrúa, Montevideo
Portugal	7
Uruguay	26
9 March – 19:49 – Estadio Charrúa, Montevideo
Uganda	5
Kenya	7
9 March – 20:11 – Estadio Charrúa, Montevideo
Hong Kong	26
Tonga	7

Semifinals
10 March – 15:40 – Estadio Charrúa, Montevideo
Chile	7
Uruguay	10
10 March – 16:02 – Estadio Charrúa, Montevideo
Kenya	14
Hong Kong	21

Final
10 March – 19:39 – Estadio Charrúa, Montevideo
Uruguay	28
Hong Kong	0
3rd place final
10 March – 18:37 – Estadio Charrúa, Montevideo
Chile	12
Kenya	31

=== Final placings ===
Place	Team
1st place, gold medalist(s)	Uruguay
2nd place, silver medalist(s)	Hong Kong
3rd place, bronze medalist(s)	Kenya
4	Chile
5	Germany
6	Uganda
7	Tonga
8	Portugal
9	Georgia
10	Japan
11	Papua New Guinea
12	Mexico

== Munich ==
=== Pool stage ===
The third event of the series will take place in Munich, Germany.

==== Pool A ====
Team	P	W	D	L	PF	PA	PD	BP	Pts
Uruguay	3	3	0	0	111	45	+66	0	9
Germany	3	2	0	1	96	39	+57	1	7
Georgia	3	1	0	2	49	85	-36	0	3
Papua New Guinea	3	0	0	3	34	121	-87	0	0

18 May
12:28

Germany	28–10	Georgia

Dantestadion, Munich

18 May
12:50

Uruguay	47–12	Papua New Guinea

Dantestadion, Munich

18 May
15:10

Germany	47–5	Papua New Guinea

Dantestadion, Munich

18 May
15:32

Uruguay	40–12	Georgia

Dantestadion, Munich

18 May
17:52

Georgia	27–17	Papua New Guinea

Dantestadion, Munich

18 May
18:14

Uruguay	24–21	Germany

Dantestadion, Munich

==== Pool B ====
Team	P	W	D	L	PF	PA	PD	BP	Pts
Hong Kong	3	3	0	0	132	24	+108	0	9
Uganda	3	2	0	1	71	57	+14	0	6
Tonga	3	1	0	2	52	85	-33	0	3
Mexico	3	0	0	3	33	122	-89	0	0

18 May
11:44

Hong Kong	54–7	Mexico

Dantestadion, Munich

18 May
12:06

Uganda	26–12	Tonga

Dantestadion, Munich

18 May
14:26

Uganda	33–12	Mexico

Dantestadion, Munich

18 May
14:48

Hong Kong	45–5	Tonga

Dantestadion, Munich

18 May
17:08

Tonga	35–14	Mexico

Dantestadion, Munich

18 May
17:30

Hong Kong	33–12	Uganda

Dantestadion, Munich

==== Pool C ====
Team	P	W	D	L	PF	PA	PD	BP	Pts
Kenya	3	3	0	0	78	29	+49	0	9
Chile	3	2	0	1	77	34	+43	1	7
Portugal	3	1	0	2	38	79	-41	0	3
Japan	3	0	0	3	31	82	-51	0	0

18 May
11:00

Chile	39–5	Portugal

Dantestadion, Munich

18 May
11:22

Kenya	28–12	Japan

Dantestadion, Munich

18 May
13:42

Chile	26–12	Japan

Dantestadion, Munich

18 May
14:04

Kenya	33–5	Portugal

Dantestadion, Munich

18 May
16:24

Portugal	28–7	Japan

Dantestadion, Munich

18 May
16:46

Kenya	17–12	Chile

Dantestadion, Munich

==== Ranking of third-placed teams ====
Team	P	W	D	L	PF	PA	PD	Pts	BP
Tonga	3	1	0	2	52	85	-33	0	3
Georgia	3	1	0	2	49	85	-36	0	3
Portugal	3	1	0	2	38	79	-41	0	3

=== Play-offs ===
==== 9th to 12th playoffs ====
9th place semifinals
19 May – 14:28 – Dantestadion, Munich
Japan	33
Papua New Guinea	26
19 May – 14:50 – Dantestadion, Munich
Portugal	35
Mexico	14

9th place final
19 May – 17:32 – Dantestadion, Munich
Japan	17
Portugal	35
11th place final
19 May – 17:10 – Dantestadion, Munich
Papua New Guinea	27
Mexico	22

==== 5th to 8th playoffs ====
Seventh place

19 May
17:54

Georgia	28–26	Tonga

Dantestadion, Munich

Fifth place

19 May
18:16

Kenya	48-0	Uganda

Dantestadion, Munich

==== Cup ====
Quarterfinals
19 May – 13:00 – Dantestadion, Munich
Hong Kong	42
Tonga	14
19 May – 11:22 – Dantestadion, Munich
Kenya	17
Germany	19
19 May – 13:44 – Dantestadion, Munich
Uruguay	24
Georgia	7
19 May – 14:06 – Dantestadion, Munich
Uganda	14
Chile	24

Semifinals
19 May – 16:06 – Dantestadion, Munich
Hong Kong	14
Germany	21
19 May – 16:28 – Dantestadion, Munich
Uruguay	24
Chile	0

Final
19 May – 19:23 – Dantestadion, Munich
Germany	19
Uruguay	21
3rd place final
19 May – 18:58 – Dantestadion, Munich
Hong Kong	12
Chile	0

=== Final placings ===
Place	Team
1st place, gold medalist(s)	Uruguay
2nd place, silver medalist(s)	Germany
3rd place, bronze medalist(s)	Hong Kong
4	Chile
5	Kenya
6	Uganda
7	Georgia
8	Tonga
9	Portugal
10	Japan
11	Papua New Guinea
12	Mexico

== See also ==
- 2024 World Rugby Sevens Challenger Series – Women's tour
