= 2020 World Rugby Sevens Challenger Series – Women's tour =

2020 Sevens Challenger Series Women's tour
- (Cancelled)
- Hosts: South Africa
- Date: 28–29 March 2020

The women's rugby sevens tournament in the World Rugby Sevens Challenger Series for 2020 was cancelled due to the COVID-19 pandemic. The tournament had been scheduled for 28–29 March 2020 in Stellenbosch, South Africa at the Danie Craven Stadium with twelve teams competing.

It was intended to be the qualifying event for the World Rugby Sevens Series, with the winner gaining promotion as a core team for the 2020–21 season. World Rugby initially postponed the tournament without rescheduling a future date, before eventually cancelling it altogether. As such, there was no team promoted or relegated for the 2020–21 World Rugby Women's Sevens Series.

== Teams ==
There were 12 national women's teams qualified for the Challenger Series tournament for 2020.

| Nation | Means of qualification | Date qualified |
|---|---|---|
| Mexico | 2019 RAN Women's Sevens | 7 July 2019 |
| Poland Scotland Belgium | 2019 Rugby Europe Women's Sevens Grand Prix Series | 21 July 2019 |
| Japan China Kazakhstan | 2019 Asia Rugby Women's Sevens Series | 29 September 2019 |
| South Africa Kenya | 2019 Africa Women's Sevens | 13 October 2019 |
| Papua New Guinea | 2019 Oceania Women's Sevens Championship | 9 November 2019 |
| Argentina Colombia | 2019 Sudamerica Rugby Women's Sevens | 9 November 2019 |
| Total | | 12 |

== Tour venue ==
| Host | Stadium | City | Dates | Winner |
|---|---|---|---|---|
| South Africa | Danie Craven Stadium | Stellenbosch | Cancelled | N/A |

== See also ==
- 2020 World Rugby Sevens Challenger Series – Men's tour
