= 2019 Rugby Europe Sevens Grand Prix Series =

Rugby tournaments

- Hosts: Russia; Poland
- Date: 22 June – 20 July
- Nations: 12

Final positions
- Champions: Germany
- Runners-up: France
- Third: Ireland

Series details
- Matches played: 68

The 2019 Rugby Europe Sevens Grand Prix Series was the eighteenth edition of the continental championship for rugby sevens in Europe. The series took place over two legs, the first at Moscow in Russia and the second at Łódź in Poland.

France won in Moscow but Germany won the Łódź tournament to take out the series championship title for the first time.

Germany, Italy and Portugal, as the three highest-placed nations without core team status on the World Rugby Sevens Series, gained entry to the inaugural World Rugby Sevens Challenger Series for a chance to qualify to the World Sevens Series in 2020–21.

The Moscow leg of the tournament also served as a pre-qualifier for the 2020 Summer Olympics. The nine highest-placed eligible European teams from that tournament advanced to the Olympic regional qualifier held in Colomiers, France.

== Schedule ==
The official schedule for the 2019 Rugby Europe Sevens Grand Prix Series was:

2019 Series schedule
Leg	Stadium	City	Dates	Winner
Russia	Luzhniki Stadium	Moscow	22–23 June	France
Poland	Miejski Stadium	Łódź	20–21 July	Germany

== Series standings ==
Final standings over the two legs of the Grand Prix series:

Pos	Team	Moscow	Łódź	Total points	Qualification or relegation
1	Germany	14	20	34	Advanced to Olympic qualifier and Challenger Series for 2020
2	France^{*}	20	12	32	
3	Ireland^{*}	18	14	32	
4	Spain	10	18	28	
5	Italy^{*}	6	16	22	Advanced to Olympic qualifier and Challenger Series for 2020
6	Wales ^{GB}^{*}	12	10	22	Excluded from Olympic qualifier
7	England^{GB}	16	3	19	
8	Portugal	8	8	16	Advanced to Olympic qualifier and Challenger Series for 2020
9	Georgia	3	6	9	
10	Russia	4	4	8	
11	Poland	2	2	4	Excluded from Olympic qualifier
12	Romania	1	1	2	Excluded from Olympic qualifier, relegated to 2020 Trophy

Legend
Blue fill	Entry to Olympic regional qualifier and World Challenger Series
No fill	Entry to Olympic regional qualifier
Dark bar	Already a core team for the 2019–20 World Rugby Sevens Series
Pink fill	Excluded from Olympic regional qualifier
Red fill	Excluded from Olympic regional qualifier and relegated to 2020 European Trophy

Notes:

^^{*} As per Rugby Europe rules, France was placed higher than Ireland due to a better head-to-head record and superior points difference for the series. Italy was placed higher than Wales due to a superior points difference for the series.

^^{GB} By agreement between the three unions on the island of Great Britain (England, Scotland, Wales), England, as highest finisher among those nations in the 2017–18 World Rugby Sevens Series, represented Great Britain in qualifying for the 2020 Olympic Sevens. The final make-up of the Great Britain men's team was determined by the British Olympic Association.

== Moscow ==
All times in Moscow Time (UTC+03:00)

Event	Winners	Score	Finalists	Semifinalists
Cup	France	31–26	Ireland	England (3rd); Germany
Plate	Wales	28–5	Spain	Portugal (7th); Italy
Bowl	Russia	14–0	Georgia	Poland (11th); Romania

=== Pool stage ===
==== Pool A ====
Team	Pld	W	D	L	PF	PA	PD	Pts
France	3	3	0	0	97	33	+64	9
Ireland	3	2	0	1	69	52	+17	7
Italy	3	1	0	2	45	66	–21	5
Romania	3	0	0	3	19	79	–60	3

22 June 2019
11:00

Ireland	29–0	Romania

Referee: Finlay Brown (Scotland)

22 June 2019
11:22

France	33–7	Italy

Referee: Georgii Kopp (Russia)

22 June 2019
13:45

Ireland	26–14	Italy

Referee: Jérémy Rozier (France)

22 June 2019
14:07

France	26–12	Romania

Referee: Andrea Spadoni (Italy)

22 June 2019
16:30

Ireland	14–38	France

Referee: Paulo Duarte (Portugal)

22 June 2019
16:52

Italy	24–7	Romania

Referee: George Selwood (England)

==== Pool B ====
Team	Pld	W	D	L	PF	PA	PD	Pts
Portugal	3	3	0	0	78	44	+34	9
Wales	3	2	0	1	93	40	+53	7
Germany	3	1	0	2	67	47	+20	5
Poland	3	0	0	3	24	131	–107	3

22 June 2019
11:44

Germany	45–14	Poland

Referee: Andrea Spadoni (Italy)

22 June 2019
12:06

Portugal	28–24	Wales

Referee: Jérémy Rozier (France)

22 June 2019
14:29

Germany	12–21	Wales

Referee: Paulo Duarte (Portugal)

22 June 2019
14:51

Portugal	38–10	Poland

Referee: George Selwood (England)

22 June 2019
17:14

Germany	10–12	Portugal

Referee: Finlay Brown (Scotland)

22 June 2019
17:36

Wales	48–0	Poland

Referee: Georgii Kopp (Russia)

==== Pool C ====
Team	Pld	W	D	L	PF	PA	PD	Pts
Spain	3	3	0	0	79	22	+57	9
England	3	2	0	1	126	26	+100	7
Russia	3	1	0	2	14	108	–94	5
Georgia	3	0	0	3	34	97	–63	3

22 June 2019
12:28

England	5–21	Spain

Referee: Paulo Duarte (Portugal)

22 June 2019
12:50

Russia	14–12	Georgia

Referee: George Selwood (England)

22 June 2019
15:13

England	59–5	Georgia

Referee: Georgii Kopp (Russia)

22 June 2019
15:35

Russia	0–34	Spain

Referee: Finlay Brown (Scotland)

22 June 2019
17:58

Spain	24–17	Georgia

Referee: Andrea Spadoni (Italy)

22 June 2019
18:20

Russia	0–62	England

Referee: Jérémy Rozier (France)

=== Knockout stage ===
==== 9th Place ====
Semi-finals
23 June 2019 – 11:28
Russia	34
Poland	17
23 June 2019 – 11:50
Romania	19
Georgia	24

Ninth place
23 June 2019 – 15:05
Russia	14
Georgia	0
Eleventh place
23 June 2019 – 14:43
Poland	21
Romania	19

==== 5th Place ====
Semi-finals
23 June 2019 – 13:15
Italy	24
Wales	29
23 June 2019 – 13:37
Portugal	10
Spain	14

Fifth place
23 June 2019 – 16:24
Wales	28
Spain	5
Seventh place
23 June 2019 – 16:02
Italy	17
Portugal	22

==== Cup ====
Quarter-finals
23 June 2019 – 09:57
France	53
Italy	0
23 June 2019 – 11:06
Wales	14
England	45
23 June 2019 – 10:22
Portugal	0
Germany	45
23 June 2019 – 10:44
Spain	12
Ireland	17

Semi-finals
23 June 2019 – 13:59
France	24
England	19
23 June 2019 – 14:21
Germany	10
Ireland	17

Final
23 June 2019 – 17:12
France	31
Ireland	26
Third place
23 June 2019 – 16:46
England	24
Germany	14

== Łódź ==
All times in Central European Summer Time (UTC+02:00)

Event	Winners	Score	Finalists	Semifinalists
Cup	Germany	28–14	Spain	Italy (3rd); Ireland
Plate	France	29–19	Wales	Portugal (7th); Georgia
Bowl	Russia	21–12	England	Poland (11th); Romania

=== Pool stage ===
==== Pool A ====
Team	Pld	W	D	L	PF	PA	PD	Pts
Spain	3	3	0	0	69	45	+24	9
France	3	2	0	1	64	59	+5	7
Portugal	3	1	0	2	71	57	+14	5
Romania	3	0	0	3	40	83	–43	3

20 July 2019
11:00

Spain	26–19	Portugal

Referee: Finlay Brown (Scotland)

20 July 2019
11:22

France	26–21	Romania

Referee: Paulo Duarte (Portugal)

20 July 2019
13:45

France	24–14	Portugal

Referee: Inigo Atorrasagasti (Spain)

20 July 2019
14:07

Spain	19–12	Romania

Referee: Thibault Santamaria (France)

20 July 2019
16:30

France	14–24	Spain

Referee: Adam Jones (Wales)

20 July 2019
16:52

Portugal	38–7	Romania

Referee: George Kopp (Russia)

==== Pool B ====
Team	Pld	W	D	L	PF	PA	PD	Pts
Ireland	3	3	0	0	102	24	+78	9
Italy	3	2	0	1	66	69	–3	7
Wales	3	1	0	2	74	73	+1	5
Poland	3	0	0	3	26	102	–76	3

20 July 2019
12:28

Wales	19–33	Italy

Referee: George Kopp (Russia)

20 July 2019
12:50

Ireland	33–5	Poland

Referee: Adam Jones (Wales)

20 July 2019
15:13

Ireland	43–0	Italy

Referee: Paulo Duarte (Portugal)

20 July 2019
15:35

Wales	36–14	Poland

Referee: Finlay Brown (Scotland)

20 July 2019
17:58

Ireland	26–19	Wales

Referee: Inigo Atorrasagasti (Spain)

20 July 2019
18:20

Italy	33–7	Poland

Referee: Thibault Santamaria (France)

==== Pool C ====
Team	Pld	W	D	L	PF	PA	PD	Pts
Germany	3	3	0	0	62	41	+21	9
Georgia	3	2	0	1	55	44	+11	7
England	3	1	0	2	48	66	–18	5
Russia	3	0	0	3	51	65	–14	3

20 July 2019
11:44

Germany	19–17	Russia

Referee: Inigo Atorrasagasti (Spain)

20 July 2019
12:06

England	12–21	Georgia

Referee: Thibault Santamaria (France)

20 July 2019
14:29

England	24–17	Russia

Referee: Adam Jones (Wales)

20 July 2019
14:51

Germany	15–12	Georgia

Referee: George Kopp (Russia)

20 July 2019
17:14

England	12–28	Germany

Referee: Paulo Duarte (Portugal)

20 July 2019
17:36

Russia	17–22	Georgia

Referee: Finlay Brown (Scotland)

=== Knockout stage ===
==== 9th Place ====
Semi-finals
21 July 2019 – 12:28
England	26
Poland	17
21 July 2019 – 12:50
Russia	19
Romania	0

Ninth place
21 July 2019 – 16:40
England	12
Russia	21
Eleventh place
21 July 2019 – 16:18
Poland	26
Romania	12

==== 5th Place ====
Semi-finals
21 July 2019 – 14:15
Wales	17
Georgia	14
21 July 2019 – 14:37
Portugal	10
France	31

Fifth place
21 July 2019 – 17:24
Wales	19
France	29
Seventh place
21 July 2019 – 17:02
Georgia	19
Portugal	40

==== Cup ====
Quarter-finals
21 July 2019 – 11:00
Spain	21
Wales	12
21 July 2019 – 12:06
Italy	12
Georgia	7
21 July 2019 – 11:22
Ireland	26
Portugal	19
21 July 2019 – 11:44
Germany	26
France	19

Semi-finals
21 July 2019 – 14:59
Spain	12
Italy	7
21 July 2019 – 15:21
Ireland	7
Germany	17

Final
21 July 2019 – 18:09
Spain	14
Germany	28
Third place
21 July 2019 – 17:46
Italy	21
Ireland	12
