= Germany national rugby sevens team =

Germany
- Nickname: Wolfpack
- Union: Deutscher Rugby-Verband
- Head coach: Pablo Feijoo
- Captain: Carlos Soteras Merz
First colours	Second colours

Rugby World Cup Sevens
- Appearances: 1 (first in 2022)
- Best result: 18th in 2022

The German national rugby sevens team competes in the top-level European sevens competition, the Sevens Grand Prix Series. In 2012, Germany finished eleventh out of twelve teams and avoided relegation. The team also unsuccessfully took part in the 2013 Rugby World Cup Sevens qualifying tournament in Moscow in July 2012.

In 2015 Germany qualified to the Final 2016 Olympic Qualification Tournament, where they failed to qualify for the 2016 Summer Olympics.

Germany won the 2019 Rugby Europe Sevens Grand Prix Series, an equivalent to European Championships in other team sports.

Germany finished in the top four at the playoffs for promotion/relegation at the 2025 USA Sevens, qualifying them to compete in the 2026 SVNS series.

== History ==
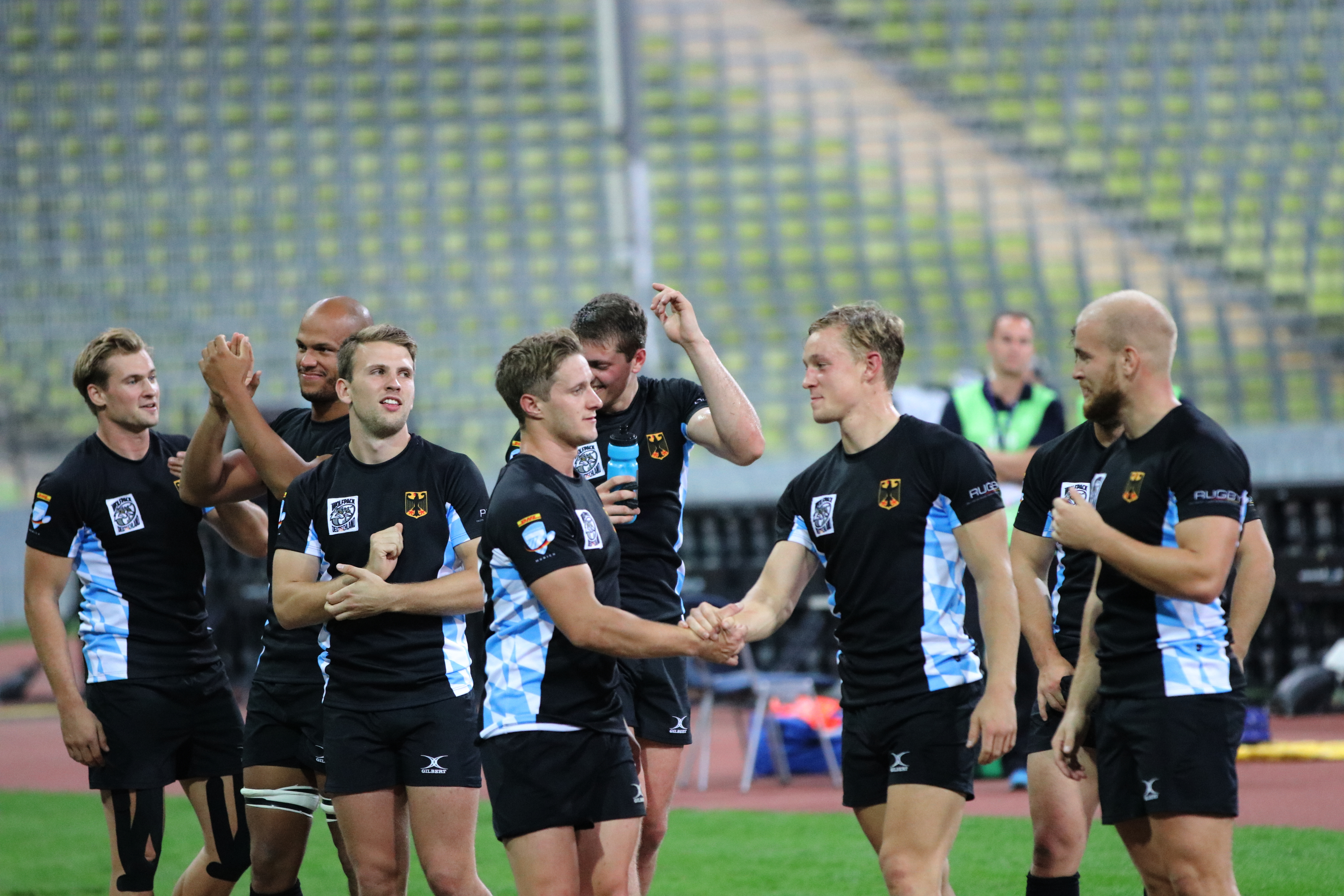
The German national rugby sevens team at the Oktoberfest Sevens in Munich 2017

The team has taken part in the Hong Kong Sevens tournament in the past, its greatest success being a win in the Bowl final in 1990, beating Thailand 28–12. In the 1990s, the team, captained by Rainer Kumm, took part in a number of international tournaments including the Punta del Este Sevens in 1997, where they lost to Argentina in the Plate final and the Paris Sevens in 1996, 1997 (when they defeated Romania in the Bowl final) and 1998 (Bowl finalists, losing to Japan in the final).

Kumm retired in 2000 to take up coaching and was replaced as captain by Mark Schulze, who led the team to the 2000 Sri Lanka Sevens, where they reached the cup semi-final, having won their pool and defeated Hong Kong in the quarter-final.

In 2000 the German Rugby Federation celebrated its centenary. Centenary celebrations included the hosting in 2000 the European leg of qualifying for the 2001 Rugby World Cup Sevens in Heidelberg, followed by a Centenary banquet in the Heidelberg Castle. In the tournament the German team thrashed Switzerland and Yugoslavia and lost 12–35 to Ireland, who had Gordon D'Arcy in their line-up.

In 2005 Germany hosted the 2005 World Games where Germany participated in the rugby sevens tournament. After losing all three games on the first day of the tournament, Germany went on to the Bowl semi-finals where they lost 35–12 against France and 31–17 against Japan in the seventh-place final.

After years of playing in the lower ranks of the Sevens Grand Prix, Germany started a continuous rise which ultimately led to a second place in the 2018 Sevens Grand Prix behind Ireland and to winning the 2019 Sevens Grand Prix ahead of France. Since 2016 they participated four times in the Hong Kong Sevens Qualifier where they reached the finals twice.

Germany qualified for the 2024 World Rugby Sevens Challenger Series. In round one of the series they went undefeated in their pool, even beating eventual winners, Kenya. However, losses to Chile in the semi-final, and to Uruguay in the bronze final saw them finish in fourth place. They finished fourth in the overall series and qualified for the SVNS promotion and relegation play-off competition at the 2024 Spain Sevens.

== Tournament history ==
=== World Cup Sevens record ===
Rugby World Cup Sevens Record
Year	Round	Position	Pld	W	L	D
(Scotland) 1993	Did not qualify					
(Hong Kong) 1997	Did not qualify					
(Argentina) 2001	Did not qualify					
(Hong Kong) 2005	Did not qualify					
(United Arab Emirates) 2009	Did not qualify					
(Russia) 2013	Did not qualify					
(United States) 2018	Did not qualify					
(South Africa) 2022	Bowl Final	18th	4	2	2	0
Total	0 Titles	1/8	4	2	2	0

=== Summer Olympics record ===
Olympic Games
Year	Round	Position	Pld	W	L	D
(Brazil) 2016	Did not qualify					
(Japan) 2020	Did not qualify					
Total	0 Titles	0/0	0	0	0	0

=== World Rugby Sevens Series ===
World Series Record
Season	Position
1999–00	22nd
2003–04	15th
2008–09	17th
2016–17	Did Not Qualify
2017–18	Did Not Qualify
2018–19	Did Not Qualify
2019–20	Did Not Qualify
2021	7th
2021-22	18th
2022-23	20th
Total	0 Titles

=== World Rugby Sevens Challenger Series ===
Sevens Challenger Series
Year	Position
(Chile) (Uruguay) 2020	3rd
2021	Not held
(Chile) 2022	4th
(South Africa) 2023	3rd
(United Arab Emirates) (Uruguay) (Germany) 2024	4th
2025	2nd

=== World Games ===
World Games
Year	Round	Position	Pld	W	L	D
2001 Akita	Did not qualify					
2005 Duisburg	7th Place Finalist	8th	5	0	5	0
2009 Kaohsiung	Did not qualify					
2013 Cali	Did not qualify					

=== Rugby Europe Sevens ===
Rugby Europe Sevens
Year	Round	Position
(Germany) 2002	Third Place	3rd
(Germany) 2003	Fourth Place	4th
(Spain) 2004	Fifteenth Place	15th
(Russia) 2005	Sixth Place	6th
(Russia) 2006	Not played	
(Germany) 2007	Ninth Place	9th
(Germany) 2008	Seventh Place	7th
(Germany) 2009	Ninth Place	9th
(Russia) 2010	Not played	
(European Union) 2011	Champions	1st (promoted)
(European Union) 2012	Eleventh Place	11th
(France) (Romania) 2013	Eleventh Place	11th
(European Union) 2014	Tenth Place	10th
(European Union) 2015	Fifth Place	5th
(European Union) 2016	Fourth Place	4th
(European Union) 2017	Fifth Place	5th
(European Union) 2018	Runners-up	2nd
(Russia) (Poland) 2019	Champions	1st
(Portugal) (Russia) 2021	Runners-up	2nd
(Portugal) (Poland) 2022	Runners-up	2nd
Total	1 Title	17/20

== Honours ==
Rugby Europe Sevens

- Winners: 2019
- Runner-up: 2018
- Third-place: 2002
- Fourth-place: 2003, 2016

== Current squad ==
Squad for the 2024 World Rugby Sevens Challenger Series in Dubai.

No.	Players
1	Felix Hufnagel
2	Bastian van der Bosch
3	John Dawe
4	Niklas Koch
5	Maximilian Heid
8	Ben Ellermann
9	Max Roddick
11	Philip Gleitze
12	Tim Lichtenberg
30	Daniel Eneke
71	Chris Umeh
99	Jakob Dipper
