= Chile national rugby sevens team =

Chile
- Union: Chilean Rugby Federation
- Nickname: Cóndores
- Coach: Joaquin Todeschini
- Captain: Joaquín Huici
Team kit	Change kit

World Cup Sevens
- Appearances: 3 (First in 2001)
- Best result: 14th place (2022)

The Chile national rugby sevens team is a minor national sevens side. They have made three appearances at the Rugby World Cup Sevens; they also compete in the Pan American Games, and have featured in the World Rugby Sevens Series.

== History ==
In the 2008 USA Sevens they lost to Australia 24-14 in the Shield finals. In preparation for the 2018 Rugby World Cup Sevens they toured Fiji, a month before the World Cup. Chile was invited to the 2021 World Rugby Sevens Series that was held in Canada, in Vancouver and Edmonton.

They have participated at two Olympic repechage tournaments, in 2016 and 2020, but were unsuccessful in qualifying for the Olympics on both occasions.

Chile qualified for the 2024 World Rugby Sevens Challenger Series in Dubai. In the first round of the series, they defeated Germany in the semi-finals before losing out to Kenya in the Cup final to finish as runners-up. They finished third overall in the Challenger series and qualified for the SVNS promotion and relegation play-off competition at the 2024 Spain Sevens.

== Tournament history ==
=== Rugby World Cup Sevens ===
Rugby World Cup Sevens Record
Year	Round	Position	Pld	W	L	D
(Scotland) 1993	Did Not Enter					
(Hong Kong) 1997	Did not qualify					
(Argentina) 2001	Bowl Winner	17th	8	4	4	0
(Hong Kong) 2005	Did not qualify					
(United Arab Emirates) 2009	Did not qualify					
(Russia) 2013	Did not qualify					
(United States) 2018	Bowl Winner	17th	4	3	1	0
(South Africa) 2022	13th Place Final	14th	5	2	3	0
Total	0 Titles	3/8	17	9	8	0

=== Olympics ===
Final Olympic Qualification Tournament
Year	Round	Position
(Brazil) 2016	Plate Semi-finals	NA
(Japan) 2020	Pool stage	6th

=== Pan American Games ===
Pan American Games
Year	Round	Position
(Mexico) 2011	Fifth Place match	5th
(Canada) 2015	Fifth Place match	5th
(Peru) 2019	Fifth Place match	5th
(Chile) 2023	Final	2nd

=== World Rugby Sevens Series ===
World Rugby Sevens Series
Tournament	Round	Position
(United States) 2008	Shield Final	NA
(Canada) 2021 (Vancouver)	11th Place Final	11th
(Canada) 2021 (Edmonton)	9th Place Final	10th

== Players ==
=== Current squad ===
The following 12 players were called up for the 2024 World Rugby Sevens Challenger Series in Dubai.

Player	Position	Date of birth (age)	Caps	Franchise/province
Clemente Armstrong	Prop	29 May 2001 (age 24)	6	(Chile) DOBS/Selknam Rugby
Luca Strabucchi	Fly-half	15 June 1999 (age 26)	25	(Chile) Alumni/Selknam Rugby
Gonzalo Lara	??	N/A	0	
Benjamín Videla	Scrum-half	24 April 2001 (age 24)	6	(Chile) Old Boys/Selknam Rugby
Cristóbal Game	Fullback	9 July 2002 (age 23)	9	(Chile) Old John's/Selknam Rugby
Lucca Avelli	Hooker	23 August 1997 (age 28)	0	(Chile) PWCC
Ernesto Tchimino	Prop	21 March 2001 (age 24)	6	(Chile) DOBS/Selknam Rugby
Francisco Urroz	??	N/A	0	
Diego Warnken	Fly-half	20 August 2001 (age 24)	18	(Chile) Alumni/Selknam Rugby
Nicolas Garafulic	??	N/A	0	
Tomas Salas	??	N/A	0	
Alvaro Castro	??	N/A	0	

== See also ==
- Chile women's national rugby sevens team
