= Rugby sevens at the 2020 Summer Olympics – Men's qualification =

Twelve teams qualified for men's rugby sevens at the 2020 Summer Olympics (postponed to 2021 due to the COVID-19 pandemic). Japan automatically qualified as host, with the top four teams of the 2018–19 World Rugby Sevens Series securing their spots. Afterwards, qualification was determined with each of the six continental confederations determining a representative, and the remaining qualification spot determined through an international sevens tournament.

== Table ==
| Event | Dates | Location | Quotas | Qualifier |
|---|---|---|---|---|
| Host | —N/a | —N/a | 1 | Japan |
| 2018–19 World Rugby Sevens Series | 30 November 2018 – 2 June 2019 | Various | 4 | Fiji |
| 2018–19 World Rugby Sevens Series | 30 November 2018 – 2 June 2019 | Various | 4 | United States |
| 2018–19 World Rugby Sevens Series | 30 November 2018 – 2 June 2019 | Various | 4 | New Zealand |
| 2018–19 World Rugby Sevens Series | 30 November 2018 – 2 June 2019 | Various | 4 | South Africa |
| 2019 South American Qualifying Tournament | 29–30 June 2019 | (Chile) Santiago | 1 | Argentina |
| 2019 RAN Sevens | 6–7 July 2019 | (Cayman Islands) George Town | 1 | Canada |
| 2019 European Qualifying Tournament | 13–14 July 2019 | (France) Colomiers | 1 | Great Britain (Note: Great Britain qualified for the Olympics through England's performance as England were the designated home nation that could earn Olympic qualification for Great Britain) |
| 2019 Oceania Sevens Championship | 7–9 November 2019 | (Fiji) Suva | 1 | Australia |
| 2019 Africa Men's Sevens | 8–9 November 2019 | (South Africa) Johannesburg | 1 | Kenya |
| 2019 Asian Qualifying Tournament | 23–24 November 2019 | (South Korea) Incheon | 1 | South Korea |
| 2020 Final Olympic Qualification Tournament | 19–20 June 2021 | (Monaco) Stade Louis II | 1 | Ireland |
| Total | | | | 12 |

== 2018–19 World Rugby Sevens Series ==
As a principal route for the tournament, four places were determined by performance in the series over ten tournaments.

2018–19 Core Teams
| Pos | Event Team | Dubai | Cape Town | Hamilton | Sydney | Las Vegas | Vancouver | Hong Kong | Singapore | London | Paris | Points total |
|---|---|---|---|---|---|---|---|---|---|---|---|---|
| 1 | Fiji | 13 | 22 | 22 | 15 | 12 | 17 | 22 | 19 | 22 | 22 | 186 |
| 2 | United States | 19 | 19 | 19 | 19 | 22 | 15 | 17 | 15 | 17 | 15 | 177 |
| 3 | New Zealand | 22 | 15 | 17 | 22 | 17 | 13 | 12 | 12 | 13 | 19 | 162 |
| 4 | South Africa | 12 | 17 | 15 | 13 | 10 | 22 | 10 | 22 | 10 | 17 | 148 |
| 5 | England (Note: By agreement between the three unions on the island of Great Britain (England, Scotland, Wales), England, as highest finisher among those nations in the 2017–18 series, represented Great Britain in qualifying for the 2020 Olympic Sevens. The final make-up of the Great Britain men's team was determined by the British Olympic Association.) | 17 | 13 | 8 | 17 | 13 | 12 | 10 | 17 | 2 | 5 | 114 |
| 6 | Samoa | 8 | 7 | 12 | 3 | 19 | 10 | 15 | 13 | 8 | 12 | 107 |
| 7 | Australia | 15 | 10 | 10 | 12 | 10 | 8 | 5 | 10 | 19 | 5 | 104 |
| 8 | France | 7 | 5 | 2 | 10 | 1 | 19 | 19 | 8 | 15 | 13 | 99 |
| 9 | Argentina | 10 | 8 | 5 | 8 | 15 | 10 | 13 | 10 | 5 | 10 | 94 |
| 10 | ~~Scotland~~ | 10 | 10 | 13 | 1 | 8 | 5 | 8 | 7 | 7 | 3 | 72 |
| 11 | Canada | 5 | 5 | 10 | 5 | 3 | 7 | 1 | 5 | 10 | 8 | 59 |
| 12 | Spain | 5 | 12 | 5 | 10 | 7 | 3 | 3 | 2 | 1 | 1 | 49 |
| 13 | Kenya | 1 | 3 | 7 | 1 | 5 | 1 | 5 | 3 | 1 | 10 | 37 |
| 14 | ~~Wales~~ | 3 | 2 | 1 | 5 | 2 | 5 | 2 | 5 | 5 | 1 | 31 |
| 15 | Japan | 2 | 1 | 1 | 7 | 1 | 2 | 7 | 1 | 3 | 2 | 27 |

- Notes:

== Africa ==
Rugby Africa held the 2019 Africa Men's Sevens on 9–10 November 2019 in Johannesburg, South Africa, with 2018 regional tournaments serving as a qualifier for the final tournament. Title winners Kenya gained direct entry to the Olympic Games, while Uganda and Zimbabwe progressed to the final qualifying stage. South Africa had already qualified through a top 4 finish in the World Rugby Sevens Series.

Round 1 teams

- Botswana
- Ghana
- Ivory Coast
- Kenya
- Madagascar
- Mauritius
- Morocco
- Namibia
- Nigeria
- Senegal
- Tunisia
- Uganda
- Zambia
- Zimbabwe

Pool A

| Team | Pld | W | D | L | PF | PA | PD | Pts |
|---|---|---|---|---|---|---|---|---|
| Zimbabwe | 3 | 3 | 0 | 0 | 81 | 19 | +62 | 9 |
| Madagascar | 3 | 2 | 0 | 1 | 93 | 43 | +50 | 7 |
| Zambia | 3 | 1 | 0 | 2 | 47 | 59 | –12 | 5 |
| Nigeria | 3 | 0 | 0 | 3 | 19 | 119 | –100 | 3 |

Pool B

| Team | Pld | W | D | L | PF | PA | PD | Pts |
|---|---|---|---|---|---|---|---|---|
| Kenya | 3 | 3 | 0 | 0 | 107 | 7 | +100 | 9 |
| Uganda | 3 | 2 | 0 | 1 | 94 | 53 | +41 | 7 |
| Namibia | 3 | 1 | 0 | 2 | 55 | 87 | –32 | 5 |
| Senegal | 3 | 0 | 0 | 3 | 31 | 140 | –109 | 3 |

Knockout round

Semi-finals
9 November – 13:00 – Bosman Stadium
Zimbabwe | 12
Uganda | 21
9 November – 13:22 – Bosman Stadium
Kenya | 40
Madagascar | 14

Final
9 November – Bosman Stadium
Uganda | 0
Kenya | 29
Third place
9 November – Bosman Stadium
Zimbabwe | 24
Madagascar | 7

== Asia ==
Asia Rugby held a tournament on 23–24 November 2019 in Incheon, South Korea. The tournament winners South Korea gained direct entry to the Olympic Games, while Hong Kong and China progressed to the final qualifying stage. Japan had already qualified for the 2020 Summer Olympics as host.

Pool A

| Team | Pld | W | D | L | PF | PA | PD | Pts |
|---|---|---|---|---|---|---|---|---|
| Hong Kong | 2 | 2 | 0 | 0 | 108 | 0 | +108 | 6 |
| Malaysia | 2 | 1 | 0 | 1 | 26 | 73 | –47 | 4 |
| Chinese Taipei | 2 | 0 | 0 | 2 | 19 | 80 | –61 | 2 |

Pool B

| Team | Pld | W | D | L | PF | PA | PD | Pts |
|---|---|---|---|---|---|---|---|---|
| China | 2 | 2 | 0 | 0 | 59 | 27 | +32 | 6 |
| Philippines | 2 | 1 | 0 | 1 | 36 | 38 | –2 | 4 |
| Singapore | 2 | 0 | 0 | 2 | 24 | 54 | –30 | 2 |

Pool C

| Team | Pld | W | D | L | PF | PA | PD | Pts |
|---|---|---|---|---|---|---|---|---|
| South Korea | 2 | 2 | 0 | 0 | 63 | 7 | +56 | 6 |
| Sri Lanka | 2 | 1 | 0 | 1 | 33 | 49 | –16 | 4 |
| Afghanistan | 2 | 0 | 0 | 2 | 5 | 45 | –40 | 2 |

Knockout round

Quarter-finals
24 November – 10:00 – Namdong Asiad Stadium
South Korea | 32
Malaysia | 7
24 November – 10:22 – Namdong Asiad Stadium
China | 50
Singapore | 5
24 November – 10:44 – Namdong Asiad Stadium
Sri Lanka | 17
Philippines | 24
24 November – 11:06 – Namdong Asiad Stadium
Hong Kong | 38
Afghanistan | 0

Semi-finals
24 November – 14:14 – Namdong Asiad Stadium
South Korea | 12
China | 7
24 November – 14:36 – Namdong Asiad Stadium
Philippines | 0
Hong Kong | 26

Final
24 November – 17:30 – Namdong Asiad Stadium
South Korea | 12
Hong Kong | 7
Third place
24 November – 17:04 – Namdong Asiad Stadium
China | 19
Philippines | 14

== Europe ==
Rugby Europe held a tournament on 13–14 July 2019 in Colomiers, France.

Teams competing in the tournament included:

- The top nine placed Olympic teams in the 2019 Moscow Sevens, with England representing Great Britain for qualification purposes
- The 2019 Rugby Europe Sevens Trophy winner and runner-up
- The 2019 Rugby Europe Sevens Conference winner

England won the tournament, meaning that Great Britain qualified for the 2020 Olympics. The second and third placed teams, France and Ireland, qualified for the inter-continental tournament for the last available slot.

Pool A

| Team | Pld | W | D | L | PF | PA | PD | Pts |
|---|---|---|---|---|---|---|---|---|
| France | 3 | 3 | 0 | 0 | 86 | 15 | +71 | 9 |
| Italy | 3 | 2 | 0 | 1 | 63 | 46 | +17 | 7 |
| Portugal | 3 | 1 | 0 | 2 | 64 | 29 | +35 | 5 |
| Hungary | 3 | 0 | 0 | 3 | 0 | 123 | –123 | 3 |

Pool B

| Team | Pld | W | D | L | PF | PA | PD | Pts |
|---|---|---|---|---|---|---|---|---|
| Spain | 3 | 2 | 1 | 0 | 104 | 22 | +82 | 8 |
| Ireland | 3 | 2 | 1 | 0 | 110 | 31 | +79 | 8 |
| Russia | 3 | 1 | 0 | 2 | 54 | 106 | –52 | 5 |
| Ukraine | 3 | 0 | 0 | 3 | 12 | 121 | –109 | 3 |

Pool C

| Team | Pld | W | D | L | PF | PA | PD | Pts |
|---|---|---|---|---|---|---|---|---|
| England | 3 | 3 | 0 | 0 | 97 | 14 | +83 | 9 |
| Germany | 3 | 2 | 0 | 1 | 64 | 59 | +5 | 7 |
| Georgia | 3 | 1 | 0 | 2 | 52 | 57 | –5 | 5 |
| Lithuania | 3 | 0 | 0 | 3 | 19 | 102 | –83 | 3 |

Knockout stage

Quarter-finals
14 July – 11:00 – Stade Michel Bendichou
France | 28
Georgia | 0
14 July – 12:06 – Stade Michel Bendichou
Ireland | 21
Germany | 0
14 July – 11:22 – Stade Michel Bendichou
Spain | 5
Portugal | 14
14 July – 11:44 – Stade Michel Bendichou
England | 35
Italy | 0

Semi-finals
14 July – 14:59 – Stade Michel Bendichou
France | 19
Ireland | 12
14 July – 15:21 – Stade Michel Bendichou
Portugal | 12
England | 29

Final
14 July – 18:11 – Stade Michel Bendichou
France | 7
England | 31
Third place
14 July – 17:46 – Stade Michel Bendichou
Ireland | 26
Portugal | 10

== North America ==
Rugby Americas North held the 2019 RAN Sevens on 6–7 July 2019 at George Town, Cayman Islands. Canada won the tournament and gained direct entry to the Olympics. The second and third placed teams, Jamaica and Mexico, progressed to the final qualifying stage to play for the last available slot. The United States qualified through a top 4 finish in the World Rugby Sevens Series.

Pool A

| Team | Pld | W | D | L | PF | PA | PD | Pts |
|---|---|---|---|---|---|---|---|---|
| Canada | 3 | 3 | 0 | 0 | 151 | 5 | +146 | 9 |
| Mexico | 3 | 2 | 0 | 1 | 60 | 61 | –1 | 6 |
| Bermuda | 3 | 1 | 0 | 2 | 17 | 101 | –84 | 3 |
| Barbados | 3 | 0 | 0 | 3 | 27 | 88 | –61 | 0 |

Pool B

| Team | Pld | W | D | L | PF | PA | PD | Pts |
|---|---|---|---|---|---|---|---|---|
| Jamaica | 3 | 3 | 0 | 0 | 111 | 12 | +99 | 9 |
| Trinidad and Tobago | 3 | 2 | 0 | 1 | 43 | 39 | +4 | 6 |
| Cayman Islands | 3 | 1 | 0 | 2 | 24 | 78 | –54 | 3 |
| Guyana | 3 | 0 | 0 | 3 | 26 | 75 | –49 | 0 |

Knockout stage

Quarter-finals
7 July – 9:30 – Truman Bodden Sports Complex
Canada | 47
Guyana | 5
7 July – 9:52 – Truman Bodden Sports Complex
Trinidad and Tobago | 5
Bermuda | 7
7 July – 10:14 – Truman Bodden Sports Complex
Mexico | 12
Cayman Islands | 7
7 July – 10:36 – Truman Bodden Sports Complex
Jamaica | 24
Barbados | 10

Semi-finals
7 July – 12:48 – Truman Bodden Sports Complex
Canada | 55
Bermuda | 0
7 July – 13:10 – Truman Bodden Sports Complex
Mexico | 7
Jamaica | 24

Final
7 July – 16:30 – Truman Bodden Sports Complex
Canada | 40
Jamaica | 5
Third place
7 July – 17:14 – Truman Bodden Sports Complex
Bermuda | 0
Mexico | 50

== Oceania ==
Oceania Rugby held the 2019 Oceania Sevens Championship on 7–9 November 2019 at Suva, Fiji. The tournament included Japan as an invited team. Australia won the Oceania title and gained direct entry to the Olympics. As the next highest placing eligible teams not already qualified, Samoa and Tonga progressed to the final qualifying stage to play for the last available slot. Fiji and New Zealand had previously qualified through a top 4 finish in the World Rugby Sevens Series.

Pool A

| Pos | Team | P | W | D | L | PF | PA | PD | Pts | Qualification |
|---|---|---|---|---|---|---|---|---|---|---|
| 1 | Fiji | 4 | 4 | 0 | 0 | 175 | 15 | +160 | 12 | Advance to title playoffs |
| 2 | Japan | 4 | 3 | 0 | 1 | 98 | 45 | +53 | 10 | Advance to title playoffs |
| 3 | New Zealand | 4 | 2 | 0 | 2 | 124 | 38 | +86 | 8 | Middle classification |
| 4 | New Caledonia | 4 | 1 | 0 | 3 | 17 | 180 | –163 | 6 | Lower classification |
| 5 | Niue | 4 | 0 | 0 | 4 | 7 | 143 | –136 | 4 | Fifteenth place |

Pool B

| Pos | Team | P | W | D | L | PF | PA | PD | Pts | Qualification |
|---|---|---|---|---|---|---|---|---|---|---|
| 1 | Samoa | 4 | 4 | 0 | 0 | 156 | 7 | +149 | 12 | Advance to title playoffs |
| 2 | Papua New Guinea | 4 | 3 | 0 | 1 | 77 | 50 | +27 | 10 | Fifth place match |
| 3 | Solomon Islands | 4 | 2 | 0 | 2 | 45 | 88 | –43 | 8 | Middle classification |
| 4 | Cook Islands | 4 | 1 | 0 | 3 | 50 | 88 | –38 | 6 | Middle classification |
| 5 | Tuvalu | 4 | 0 | 0 | 4 | 24 | 119 | –95 | 4 | Lower classification |

Pool C

| Pos | Team | P | W | D | L | PF | PA | PD | Pts | Qualification |
|---|---|---|---|---|---|---|---|---|---|---|
| 1 | Australia | 4 | 4 | 0 | 0 | 201 | 7 | +194 | 12 | Advance to title playoffs |
| 2 | Tonga | 4 | 3 | 0 | 1 | 97 | 44 | +53 | 10 | Fifth place match |
| 3 | American Samoa | 4 | 2 | 0 | 2 | 41 | 116 | –75 | 8 | Middle classification |
| 4 | Vanuatu | 4 | 1 | 0 | 3 | 43 | 119 | –76 | 6 | Lower classification |
| 5 | Nauru | 4 | 0 | 0 | 4 | 33 | 129 | –96 | 4 | Lower classification |

Title playoffs

International playoff

Oceania final

9 November 2019 – 16.14 – ANZ Stadium

A1
Fiji
33

| 9 November 2019 – 19.50 – ANZ Stadium |
| Fiji | 7 |
| Australia | 22 |

A2
Japan
0

9 November 2019 – 16.36 – ANZ Stadium

B1
Samoa
12

Third place

C1
Australia
19

9 November 2019 – 18.57 – ANZ Stadium

Japan
26

Samoa
21

Fifth place match

9 November 2019 – 17.20 – ANZ Stadium
Papua New Guinea | 0
Tonga | 31

== South America ==
Sudamérica Rugby held a tournament on 29–30 June 2019 in Santiago, Chile. The tournament winners Argentina gained direct entry to the Olympic Games, while Brazil and Chile progressed to the final qualifying stage.

Pool A

| Team | Pld | W | D | L | PF | PA | PD | Pts |
|---|---|---|---|---|---|---|---|---|
| Argentina | 4 | 4 | 0 | 0 | 184 | 5 | +179 | 12 |
| Paraguay | 4 | 3 | 0 | 1 | 74 | 64 | +10 | 10 |
| Colombia | 4 | 2 | 0 | 2 | 80 | 26 | +54 | 8 |
| Peru | 4 | 1 | 0 | 3 | 47 | 130 | –83 | 6 |
| Guatemala | 4 | 0 | 0 | 4 | 29 | 146 | –117 | 4 |

Pool B

| Team | Pld | W | D | L | PF | PA | PD | Pts |
|---|---|---|---|---|---|---|---|---|
| Brazil | 4 | 4 | 0 | 0 | 148 | 22 | +126 | 12 |
| Chile | 4 | 3 | 0 | 1 | 146 | 19 | +127 | 10 |
| Uruguay | 4 | 2 | 0 | 2 | 106 | 61 | +45 | 8 |
| Costa Rica | 4 | 1 | 0 | 3 | 24 | 180 | –156 | 6 |
| Venezuela | 4 | 0 | 0 | 4 | 26 | 168 | –142 | 4 |

Knockout stage

Semi-finals
30 June 2019 – 15:48 – Old Grangonian Club
Argentina | 35
Chile | 0
30 June 2019 – 16:10 – Old Grangonian Club
Brazil | 14
Paraguay | 12

Final
30 June 2019 – 19:04 – Old Grangonian Club
Argentina | 26
Brazil | 0
Third place
30 June 2019 – 18:42 – Old Grangonian Club
Chile | 43
Paraguay | 0

== Final Olympic qualification event ==
A 12-team repechage tournament was scheduled to be held from 20 to 21 June 2020, but was postponed due to the COVID-19 pandemic. Two runners-up from each of the six continental qualification tournaments played, with the winner — Ireland — advancing to the Olympic tournament.

| Continent | Qualifiers |
|---|---|
| Africa | Uganda |
| Africa | Zimbabwe |
| Asia | China |
| Asia | Hong Kong |
| Europe | France |
| Europe | Ireland |
| North America | Jamaica |
| North America | Mexico |
| Oceania | Samoa |
| Oceania | Tonga |
| South America | Brazil |
| South America | Chile |
| Total | 12 |

== See also ==
- Rugby sevens at the 2020 Summer Olympics – Women's qualification
