= 2017 Rugby Europe Sevens Trophy =

- Hosts: Czech Republic; Romania
- Date: 3–18 June

Final positions
- Champions: Sweden
- Runners-up: Romania
- Third: Luxembourg

The 2017 Rugby Europe Sevens Trophy is the second division of Rugby Europe's 2017 sevens season. This edition was hosted by the cities of Ostrava and Bucharest from 3–18 June, with the winner promoted to the 2018 Grand Prix and the two teams with the fewest points relegated to Conference 1.

== Schedule ==
Date	Venue	Winner	Runner-up	Third
3–4 June	(Czech Republic) Ostrava	Sweden	Romania	Luxembourg
17–18 June	(Romania) Bucharest	Sweden	Lithuania	Romania

== Trophy Standings ==
Legend
Promoted to the Grand Prix series for 2018
Relegated to Conference 1 for 2018

Rank	Team	Ostrava	Bucharest	Points
1st place, gold medalist(s)	Sweden	20	20	40
2nd place, silver medalist(s)	Romania	18	16	34
3rd place, bronze medalist(s)	Luxembourg	16	14	30
4	Ukraine	14	8	22
5	Lithuania	3	18	21
6	Croatia	8	12	20
7	Israel	12	6	18
8	Cyprus	10	4	14
9	Denmark	2	10	12
10	Latvia	6	1	7
11	Moldova	4	2	6
12	Czech Republic	1	3	4

== Ostrava ==
Event	Winners	Score	Finalists	Semifinalists
Cup	Sweden	14–5	Romania	Luxembourg (Third); Ukraine
5th Place	Israel	24–12	Cyprus	Croatia (Seventh); Latvia
Challenge Trophy	Moldova	28–17	Lithuania	Denmark (Eleventh); Czech Republic

Key to colours in group tables
Teams that advance to Cup Quarterfinal

=== Pool Stage ===
==== Pool A ====
Teams	Pld	W	D	L	PF	PA	+/−	Pts
Luxembourg	3	2	1	0	77	26	+51	8
Cyprus	3	2	1	0	69	33	+36	8
Lithuania	3	0	1	2	36	66	–30	4
Moldova	3	0	1	2	19	76	–57	4

Matches

3 June 2017
9:57

Lithuania	5–21	Luxembourg

3 June 2017
10:19

Cyprus	22–0	Moldova

3 June 2017
12:42

Cyprus	26–12	Lithuania

3 June 2017
13:04

Luxembourg	35–0	Moldova

3 June 2017
15:27

Lithuania	19–19	Moldova

3 June 2017
15:49

Cyprus	21–21	Luxembourg

==== Pool B ====
Teams	Pld	W	D	L	PF	PA	+/−	Pts
Ukraine	3	2	0	1	57	27	+30	7
Israel	3	2	0	1	57	38	+19	7
Croatia	3	1	0	2	32	78	–46	5
Denmark	3	1	0	2	38	41	–3	5

Matches

3 June 2017
10:41

Croatia	10–26	Ukraine

3 June 2017
11:03

Denmark	12–14	Israel

3 June 2017
13:26

Denmark	7–5	Ukraine

3 June 2017
13:48

Croatia	0–33	Israel

3 June 2017
16:11

Israel	10–26	Ukraine

3 June 2017
16:33

Croatia	22–19	Denmark

==== Pool C ====
Teams	Pld	W	D	L	PF	PA	+/−	Pts
Sweden	3	3	0	0	108	15	+93	9
Romania	3	2	0	1	92	36	+56	7
Latvia	3	1	0	2	32	97	–65	5
Czech Republic	3	0	0	3	22	106	–84	3

Matches

3 June 2017
11:25

Latvia	0–42	Romania

3 June 2017
11:47

Czech Republic	0–39	Sweden

3 June 2017
14:10

Latvia	10–38	Sweden

3 June 2017
14:32

Czech Republic	5–45	Romania

3 June 2017
16:55

Romania	5–31	Sweden

3 June 2017
17:17

Czech Republic	17–22	Latvia

=== Knockout stage ===
Challenge Trophy

Semi-finals
4 June 2017 – 11:28 – Ostrava
Lithuania	29
Czech Republic	14
4 June 2017 – 11:50 –Ostrava
Moldova	26
Denmark	10

Final
4 June 2017 – Ostrava
Lithuania	17
Moldova	28
Third place
4 June 2017 – Ostrava
Czech Republic	0
Denmark	39

5th Place

Quarter-finals
4 June 2017 – 10:00 – Ostrava
Luxembourg	26
Latvia	12
4 June 2017 – 11:06 – Ostrava
Israel	0
Romania	12
4 June 2017 – 10:22 – Ostrava
Ukraine	19
Croatia	12
4 June 2017 – 10:44 – Ostrava
Sweden	24
Cyprus	7

Semi-finals
4 June 2017 – 13:15 – Ostrava
Latvia	5
Israel	22
4 June 2017 – 13:37 –Ostrava
Croatia	14
Cyprus	29

Final
4 June 2017 – Ostrava
Israel	24
Cyprus	12
Third place
4 June 2017 – Ostrava
Latvia	7
Croatia	19

Cup

Quarter-finals
4 June 2017 – 10:00 – Ostrava
Luxembourg	26
Latvia	12
4 June 2017 – 11:06 – Ostrava
Israel	0
Romania	12
4 June 2017 – 10:22 – Ostrava
Ukraine	19
Croatia	12
4 June 2017 – 10:44 – Ostrava
Sweden	24
Cyprus	7

Semi-finals
4 June 2017 – 13:59 – Ostrava
Luxembourg	5
Romania	31
4 June 2017 – 14:21 –Ostrava
Ukraine	0
Sweden	35

Final
4 June 2017 – 17:14 – Ostrava
Romania	5
Sweden	14
Third place
4 June 2017 – 16:52 – Ostrava
Luxembourg	14
Ukraine	10

== Bucharest ==
Event	Winners	Score	Finalists	Semifinalists
Cup	Sweden	15–5	Lithuania	Romania (Third); Luxembourg
Plate	Croatia	10–0	Denmark	Ukraine (Seventh); Israel
Bowl	Cyprus	22–7	Czech Republic	Moldova (Eleventh); Latvia

=== Pool Stage ===
==== Pool A ====
Teams	Pld	W	D	L	PF	PA	+/−	Pts
Sweden	3	3	0	0	97	21	+76	9
Croatia	3	2	0	1	53	67	–14	7
Cyprus	3	1	0	2	55	64	–9	5
Czech Republic	3	0	0	3	33	88	–55	3

Matches

17 June 2017
10:00

Sweden	35–7	Czech Republic

17 June 2017
10:22

Cyprus	19–24	Croatia

17 June 2017
12:45

Sweden	29–7	Croatia

17 June 2017
13:07

Cyprus	31–7	Czech Republic

17 June 2017
15:30

Sweden	33–7	Cyprus

17 June 2017
15:52

Croatia	22–19	Czech Republic

==== Pool B ====
Teams	Pld	W	D	L	PF	PA	+/−	Pts
Romania	3	3	0	0	59	0	+59	9
Israel	3	2	0	1	38	45	–7	7
Denmark	3	1	0	2	36	43	–7	5
Latvia	3	0	0	3	5	50	–45	3

Matches

17 June 2017
11:26

Israel	12–5	Latvia

17 June 2017
11:48

Romania	17–0	Denmark

17 June 2017
14:13

Israel	26–19	Denmark

17 June 2017
14:35

Romania	21–0	Latvia

17 June 2017
16:58

Latvia	0–17	Denmark

17 June 2017
17:20

Romania	21–0	Israel

==== Pool C ====
Teams	Pld	W	D	L	PF	PA	+/−	Pts
Lithuania	3	2	1	0	91	49	+42	8
Luxembourg	3	2	0	1	68	42	+26	7
Ukraine	3	1	1	1	59	54	+5	6
Moldova	3	0	0	3	5	78	–73	3

Matches

17 June 2017
10:44

Luxembourg	21–28	Lithuania

17 June 2017
11:06

Ukraine	17–5	Moldova

17 June 2017
13:29

Luxembourg	26–0	Moldova

17 June 2017
13:51

Ukraine	28–28	Lithuania

17 June 2017
16:14

Luxembourg	21–14	Ukraine

17 June 2017
16:36

Moldova	0–35	Lithuania

=== Knockout stage ===
Challenge Trophy

Semi-finals
18 June 2017 – 11:28
Cyprus	19
Moldova	0
18 June 2017 – 11:50
Czech Republic	14
Latvia	5

Final
18 June 2017 – 15:05
Cyprus	22
Czech Republic	7
Third place
18 June 2017 – 14:43
Moldova	14
Latvia	5

5th Place

Quarter-finals
18 June 2017 – 10:00
Sweden	36
Denmark	0
18 June 2017 – 11:06
Israel	10
Luxembourg	15
18 June 2017 – 10:22
Romania	21
Ukraine	0
18 June 2017 – 10:44
Lithuania	21
Croatia	0

Semi-finals
18 June 2017 – 13:15
Denmark	24
Israel	0
18 June 2017 – 13:37
Ukraine	5
Croatia	19

Final
18 June 2017 – 16:24
Denmark	0
Croatia	10
Third place
18 June 2017 – 16:02
Israel	10
Ukraine	19

Cup

Quarter-finals
18 June 2017 – 10:00
Sweden	36
Denmark	0
18 June 2017 – 11:06
Israel	10
Luxembourg	15
18 June 2017 – 10:22
Romania	21
Ukraine	0
18 June 2017 – 10:44
Lithuania	21
Croatia	0

Semi-finals
18 June 2017 – 13:59
Sweden	26
Luxembourg	7
18 June 2017 – 14:21
Romania	5
Lithuania	19

Final
18 June 2017 – 17:14
Sweden	15
Lithuania	5
Third place
18 June 2017 – 16:52
Luxembourg	0
Romania	29
