= Rugby sevens at the 2020 Summer Olympics =

Rugby sevens at the Games of the XXXII Olympiad
- Rugby sevens pictogram
- Venue: Tokyo Stadium
- Dates: 26–31 July 2021
- No. of events: 2
- Competitors: 288 from 16 nations

Rugby sevens at the 2020 Summer Olympics in Tokyo took place from 26 July to 31 July 2021 at the Tokyo Stadium. 24 teams (12 each for men and women) competed in the tournament. The dates were modified due to the postponement of the Tokyo 2020 games as a result of the COVID-19 pandemic.

== Competition ==
The men's and women's rugby sevens competitions took place at Tokyo Stadium, a 2019 Rugby World Cup host venue. The men's sessions took place July 26–28 with the women's sessions happening July 29–31, 2021.

=== Changes ===
In a reverse to the 2016 schedule, the men's competition was played first over three days from July 27–29 with the women's competition taking place from July 30 through August 1 and culminating with the gold medal session.

There were two sessions on each competition day. The morning session kicked-off at 9 AM JST and ran until midday JST and the evening session began at 4:30 PM and finished at 7 PM. The medal matches took place in the evening sessions.

== Qualification summary ==
| Nation | Men's | Women's | Athletes |
|---|---|---|---|
| Argentina | Yes | | 12 |
| Australia | Yes | Yes | 24 |
| Brazil | | Yes | 12 |
| Canada | Yes | Yes | 24 |
| China | | Yes | 12 |
| Fiji | Yes | Yes | 24 |
| France | | Yes | 12 |
| Great Britain | Yes | Yes | 24 |
| Ireland | Yes | | 12 |
| Kenya | Yes | Yes | 24 |
| Japan | Yes | Yes | 24 |
| New Zealand | Yes | Yes | 24 |
| ROC | | Yes | 12 |
| South Africa | Yes | | 12 |
| South Korea | Yes | | 12 |
| United States | Yes | Yes | 24 |
| Total: 16 NOCs | 12 | 12 | 288 |

=== Men's ===
| Event | Dates | Location | Quotas | Qualifier |
|---|---|---|---|---|
| Host nation | —N/a | —N/a | 1 | Japan |
| 2018–19 World Rugby Sevens Series | 30 November 2018 – 2 June 2019 | Various | 4 | Fiji |
| 2018–19 World Rugby Sevens Series | 30 November 2018 – 2 June 2019 | Various | 4 | United States |
| 2018–19 World Rugby Sevens Series | 30 November 2018 – 2 June 2019 | Various | 4 | New Zealand |
| 2018–19 World Rugby Sevens Series | 30 November 2018 – 2 June 2019 | Various | 4 | South Africa |
| 2019 South American Qualifying Tournament | 29–30 June 2019 | (Chile) Santiago | 1 | Argentina |
| 2019 RAN Sevens | 6–7 July 2019 | (Cayman Islands) George Town | 1 | Canada |
| 2019 European Qualifying Tournament | 13–14 July 2019 | (France) Colomiers | 1 | Great Britain (Note: Great Britain earned qualification through England's placement as they were nominated as the country to earn qualification for Great Britain. However, they will be able to select players from Scotland and Wales.) |
| 2019 Oceania Sevens Championship | 7–9 November 2019 | (Fiji) Suva | 1 | Australia |
| 2019 Africa Men's Sevens | 8–9 November 2019 | (South Africa) Johannesburg | 1 | Kenya |
| 2019 Asian Qualifying Tournament | 23–24 November 2019 | (South Korea) Incheon | 1 | South Korea |
| 2020 Final Olympic Qualification Tournament | 19–20 June 2021 | Monaco | 1 | Ireland (Note: The Irish rugby union teams represent the entire island of Ireland, and when representing the IRFU fly the four provinces flag of the IRFU as Ireland. In the Olympic Games, however, they represent the Olympic Council of Ireland, and therefore play under the national flag of (the Republic of) Ireland. Northern Ireland players are, however, eligible to represent the team regardless of flag (according to the Good Friday Agreement, people who are born in Northern Ireland with Irish or British lineage can automatically obtain the nationality of (the Republic of) Ireland).) |
| Total | | | | 12 |

=== Women's ===
| Event | Dates | Location | Quotas | Qualifier |
|---|---|---|---|---|
| Host nation | —N/a | —N/a | 1 | Japan |
| 2018–19 World Rugby Women's Sevens Series | 20 October 2018 – 16 June 2019 | Various | 4 | New Zealand |
| 2018–19 World Rugby Women's Sevens Series | 20 October 2018 – 16 June 2019 | Various | 4 | United States |
| 2018–19 World Rugby Women's Sevens Series | 20 October 2018 – 16 June 2019 | Various | 4 | Canada |
| 2018–19 World Rugby Women's Sevens Series | 20 October 2018 – 16 June 2019 | Various | 4 | Australia |
| 2019 South American Qualifying Tournament | 1–2 June 2019 | (Peru) Lima | 1 | Brazil |
| 2019 RAN Women's Sevens | 6–7 July 2019 | (Cayman Islands) George Town | 0 (Note: With both the United States and Canada advancing to the tournament through securing top four slots in the 2018–19 World Rugby Women's Sevens Series, the spot for the RAN champions was re-allocated to the Final Olympic Qualification Tournament, which allowed two teams to qualify for the Olympic Games.) | — |
| 2019 European Qualifying Tournament | 13–14 July 2019 | (Russia) Kazan | 1 | Great Britain |
| 2019 Africa Women's Sevens | 12–13 October 2019 | (Tunisia) Jemmal | 1 | Kenya (Note: South Africa won the qualifying tournament but declined their spot due to a policy against accepting spots from continental tournaments. Kenya, as runners-up, qualified instead.) |
| 2019 Oceania Women's Sevens Championship | 7–9 November 2019 | (Fiji) Suva | 1 | Fiji |
| 2019 Asian Qualifying Tournament | 9–10 November 2019 | (China) Guangzhou | 1 | China |
| 2020 Final Olympic Qualification Tournament | 19–20 June 2021 | Monaco | 2 | France |
| 2020 Final Olympic Qualification Tournament | 19–20 June 2021 | Monaco | 2 | ROC |
| Total | | | | 12 |

- Notes:

== Competition schedule ==
Legend

| P | Pool Stage | PM | Placing Matches | ¼ | Quarter-Finals | ½ | Semi-Finals | B | Bronze Medal Match | F | Gold Medal Match |

Schedule
| Date | Jul 26 | | Jul 27 | | | Jul 28 | | | | | Jul 29 | | Jul 30 | | | Jul 31 | | | | |
| Event | M | E | M | E | | M | | E | | | M | E | M | E | | M | | E | | |
|---|---|---|---|---|---|---|---|---|---|---|---|---|---|---|---|---|---|---|---|---|
| Men's | P | | | PM | ¼ | PM | ½ | PM | B | F | | | | | | | | | | |
| Women's | | | | | | | | | | | P | | | PM | ¼ | PM | ½ | PM | B | F |

== Medal summary ==
=== Medal table ===
| Rank | NOC | Gold | Silver | Bronze | Total |
|---|---|---|---|---|---|
| 1 | New Zealand | 1 | 1 | 0 | 2 |
| 2 | Fiji | 1 | 0 | 1 | 2 |
| 3 | France | 0 | 1 | 0 | 1 |
| 4 | Argentina | 0 | 0 | 1 | 1 |
| Totals (4 entries) | | 2 | 2 | 2 | 6 |

=== Winners ===
| Event | Gold | Silver | Bronze |
|---|---|---|---|
| Men's tournament | Fiji: Napolioni Bolaca; Vilimoni Botitu; Meli Derenalagi; Sireli Maqala; Iosefo Masi; Waisea Nacuqu; Kalione Nasoko; Semi Radradra; Aminiasi Tuimaba; Asaeli Tuivuaka; Jerry Tuwai; Josua Vakurunabili; Jiuta Wainiqolo | New Zealand: Kurt Baker; Dylan Collier; Scott Curry; Andrew Knewstubb; Ngarohi McGarvey-Black; Tim Mikkelson; Sione Molia; Etene Nanai-Seturo; Tone Ng Shiu; Amanaki Nicole; William Warbrick; Regan Ware; Joe Webber | Argentina: Santiago Álvarez; Lautaro Bazán; Lucio Cinti; Felipe del Mestre; Rodrigo Etchart; Luciano González; Rodrigo Isgro; Santiago Mare; Ignacio Mendy; Marcos Moneta; Matías Osadczuk; Gastón Revol; Germán Schulz |
| Women's tournament | New Zealand: Michaela Blyde; Kelly Brazier; Gayle Broughton; Theresa Fitzpatrick; Stacey Fluhler; Sarah Hirini; Shiray Kaka; Tyla Nathan-Wong; Risi Pouri-Lane; Alena Saili; Ruby Tui; Tenika Willison; Portia Woodman | France: Coralie Bertrand; Anne-Cécile Ciofani; Caroline Drouin; Camille Grassineau; Lina Guérin; Fanny Horta; Shannon Izar; Chloé Jacquet; Carla Neisen; Séraphine Okemba; Chloé Pelle; Jade Ulutule | Fiji: Lavena Cavuru; Raijieli Daveua; Sesenieli Donu; Laisana Likuceva; Rusila Nagasau; Ana Naimasi; Alowesi Nakoci; Roela Radiniyavuni; Viniana Riwai; Ana Maria Roqica; Vasiti Solikoviti; Lavenia Tinai; Reapi Ulunisau |

== Men's competition ==
=== Group stage ===
==== Group A ====
| Pos | Team | Pld | W | D | L | PF | PA | PD | Pts | Qualification |
|---|---|---|---|---|---|---|---|---|---|---|
| 1 | New Zealand | 3 | 3 | 0 | 0 | 99 | 31 | +68 | 9 | Quarter-finals |
| 2 | Argentina | 3 | 2 | 0 | 1 | 99 | 54 | +45 | 7 | Quarter-finals |
| 3 | Australia | 3 | 1 | 0 | 2 | 73 | 48 | +25 | 5 | Quarter-finals |
| 4 | South Korea | 3 | 0 | 0 | 3 | 10 | 148 | −138 | 3 | |

Source: Tokyo 2020 and World Rugby
Rules for classification: 1) Points; 2) Head-to-head result; 3) Point difference; 4) Points scored.

==== Group B ====
| Pos | Team | Pld | W | D | L | PF | PA | PD | Pts | Qualification |
|---|---|---|---|---|---|---|---|---|---|---|
| 1 | Fiji | 3 | 3 | 0 | 0 | 85 | 40 | +45 | 9 | Quarter-finals |
| 2 | Great Britain | 3 | 2 | 0 | 1 | 65 | 33 | +32 | 7 | Quarter-finals |
| 3 | Canada | 3 | 1 | 0 | 2 | 50 | 64 | −14 | 5 | Quarter-finals |
| 4 | Japan (H) | 3 | 0 | 0 | 3 | 31 | 94 | −63 | 3 | |

Source: Tokyo 2020 and World Rugby
Rules for classification: 1) Points; 2) Head-to-head result; 3) Point difference; 4) Points scored.
(H) Hosts

==== Group C ====
| Pos | Team | Pld | W | D | L | PF | PA | PD | Pts | Qualification |
|---|---|---|---|---|---|---|---|---|---|---|
| 1 | South Africa | 3 | 3 | 0 | 0 | 64 | 31 | +33 | 9 | Quarter-finals |
| 2 | United States | 3 | 2 | 0 | 1 | 50 | 48 | +2 | 7 | Quarter-finals |
| 3 | Ireland | 3 | 1 | 0 | 2 | 43 | 59 | −16 | 5 | |
| 4 | Kenya | 3 | 0 | 0 | 3 | 26 | 45 | −19 | 3 | |

Updated to match(es) played on 26 July 2021. Source: Tokyo 2020 and World Rugby
Rules for classification: 1) Points; 2) Head-to-head result; 3) Point difference; 4) Points scored.

=== Knockout stage ===
==== Medal playoff ====
Quarter-finals
27 July – Tokyo Stadium
New Zealand | 21
Canada | 10
27 July – Tokyo Stadium
Great Britain | 26
United States | 21
27 July – Tokyo Stadium
South Africa | 14
Argentina | 19
27 July – Tokyo Stadium
Fiji | 19
Australia | 0

Semi-finals
28 July – Tokyo Stadium
New Zealand | 29
Great Britain | 7
28 July – Tokyo Stadium
Argentina | 14
Fiji | 26

Gold medal match
28 July – Tokyo Stadium
New Zealand | 12
Fiji | 27
Bronze medal match
28 July – Tokyo Stadium
Great Britain | 12
Argentina | 17

== Women's competition ==
=== Group stage ===
==== Group A ====
| Pos | Team | Pld | W | D | L | PF | PA | PD | Pts | Qualification |
|---|---|---|---|---|---|---|---|---|---|---|
| 1 | New Zealand | 3 | 3 | 0 | 0 | 88 | 28 | +60 | 9 | Quarter-finals |
| 2 | Great Britain | 3 | 2 | 0 | 1 | 66 | 38 | +28 | 7 | Quarter-finals |
| 3 | ROC | 3 | 1 | 0 | 2 | 47 | 59 | −12 | 5 | Quarter-finals |
| 4 | Kenya | 3 | 0 | 0 | 3 | 19 | 95 | −76 | 3 | |

Source: Tokyo 2020 and World Rugby
Rules for classification: 1) Points; 2) Head-to-head result; 3) Point difference; 4) Points scored.

==== Group B ====
| Pos | Team | Pld | W | D | L | PF | PA | PD | Pts | Qualification |
|---|---|---|---|---|---|---|---|---|---|---|
| 1 | France | 3 | 3 | 0 | 0 | 83 | 10 | +73 | 9 | Quarter-finals |
| 2 | Fiji | 3 | 2 | 0 | 1 | 72 | 29 | +43 | 7 | Quarter-finals |
| 3 | Canada | 3 | 1 | 0 | 2 | 45 | 57 | −12 | 5 | |
| 4 | Brazil | 3 | 0 | 0 | 3 | 10 | 114 | −104 | 3 | |

Source: Tokyo 2020 and World Rugby
Rules for classification: 1) Points; 2) Head-to-head result; 3) Point difference; 4) Points scored.

==== Group C ====
| Pos | Team | Pld | W | D | L | PF | PA | PD | Pts | Qualification |
|---|---|---|---|---|---|---|---|---|---|---|
| 1 | United States | 3 | 3 | 0 | 0 | 59 | 33 | +26 | 9 | Quarter-finals |
| 2 | Australia | 3 | 2 | 0 | 1 | 86 | 24 | +62 | 7 | Quarter-finals |
| 3 | China | 3 | 1 | 0 | 2 | 53 | 54 | −1 | 5 | Quarter-finals |
| 4 | Japan (H) | 3 | 0 | 0 | 3 | 7 | 94 | −87 | 3 | |

Source: Tokyo 2020 and World Rugby
Rules for classification: 1) Points; 2) Head-to-head result; 3) Point difference; 4) Points scored.
(H) Hosts

=== Knockout stage ===
==== Medal playoff ====
Quarter-finals
30 July – Tokyo Stadium
New Zealand | 36
ROC | 0
30 July – Tokyo Stadium
Fiji | 14
Australia | 12
30 July – Tokyo Stadium
United States | 12
Great Britain | 21
30 July – Tokyo Stadium
France | 24
China | 10

Semi-finals
31 July – Tokyo Stadium
New Zealand (a.e.t.) | 22
Fiji | 17
31 July – Tokyo Stadium
Great Britain | 19
France | 26

Gold medal match
31 July – Tokyo Stadium
New Zealand | 26
France | 12
Bronze medal match
31 July – Tokyo Stadium
Fiji | 21
Great Britain | 12

== See also ==
- Wheelchair rugby at the 2020 Summer Paralympics
