= Mio Yamanaka =

- Born: 27 October 1995 (age 31) Higashiosaka, Osaka, Japan
- Height: 1.57 m (5 ft 2 in)
- Weight: 57 kg (126 lb)

Rugby union career
- Position: Scrum-half
Senior career
Years	Team	Apps	(Points)
	Mie Pearls		(0)
Super Rugby
Years	Team	Apps	(Points)
2025	Western Force		(0)
International career
Years	Team	Apps	(Points)
	Japan		(0)
National sevens team
Years	Team		Comps
2016–	Japan		

Mio Yamanaka (山中 美緒, Yamanaka Mio; born October 27, 1995) is a Japanese rugby union and sevens player. She competed at the 2016 and 2020 Summer Olympics.

== Rugby career ==
=== Sevens ===
Yamanaka made her sevens debut at the 2016 São Paulo Women's Sevens. She was named in Japan's women's sevens team to the 2016 Summer Olympics.

In 2017, she captained the Sakura sevens side when they launched the inaugural Japan Women's Sevens in Kitakyushu. In 2021, she competed for Japan at the delayed 2020 Summer Olympics.

=== XVs ===
Yamanaka was sin binned in Japan's repechage match against Hong Kong, it was the final qualifier for the 2017 Women's Rugby World Cup. She signed with the Western Force for the 2025 Super Rugby Women's season.
