= Tang Minglin =

Chinese rugby sevens player

Personal information
- Nationality: Chinese
- Born: 3 February 1998 (age 27)

Sport
- Sport: Rugby sevens

Tang Minglin (born 3 February 1998) is a Chinese rugby sevens player. She competed in the women's tournament at the 2020 Summer Olympics.
