= Séraphine Okemba =

French rugby union player

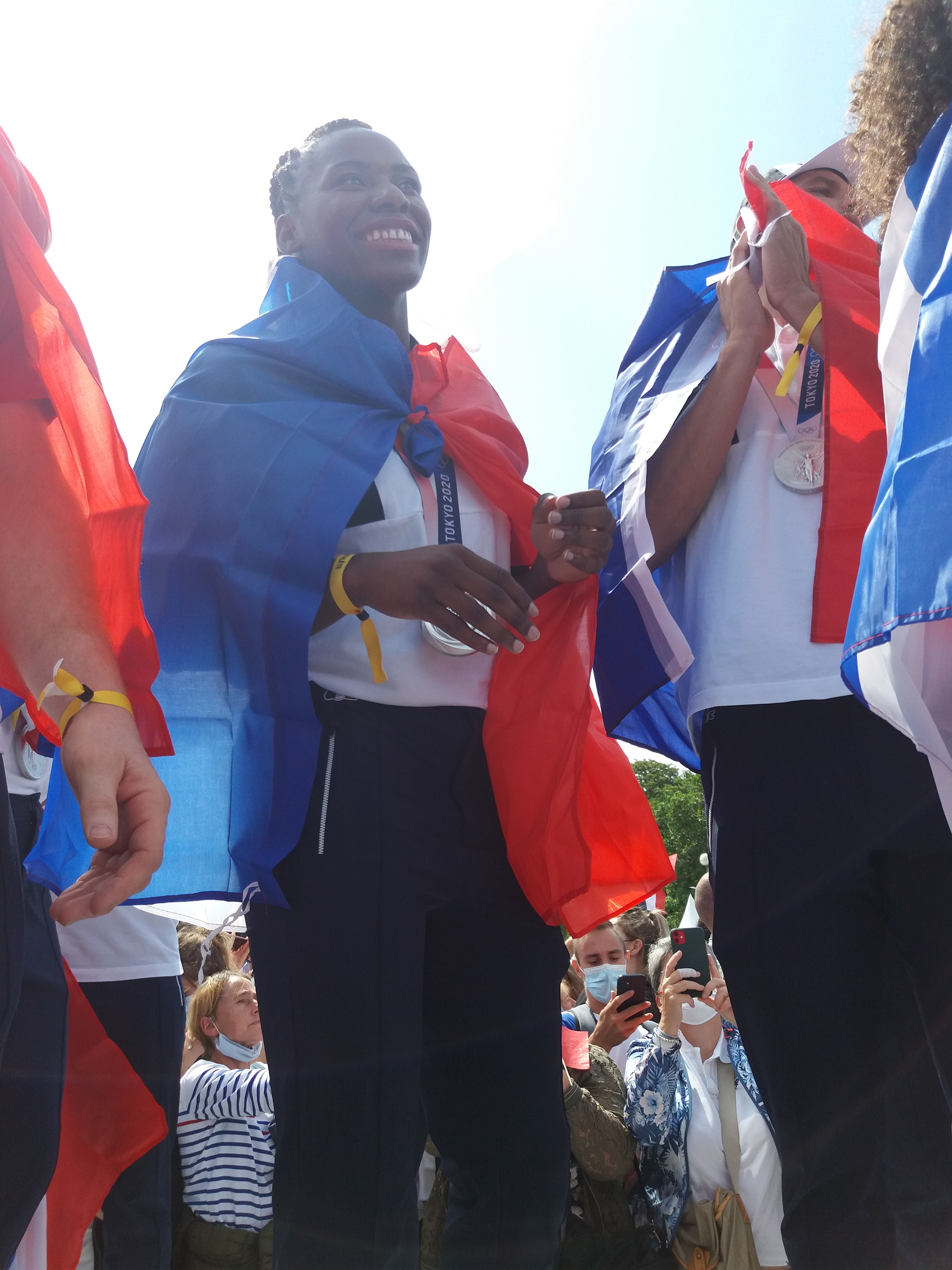
- Okemba in 2021
- Full name: Grace Séraphine Juvelle Okemba
- Born: 3 December 1995 (age 30) Dreux, France
- Height: 1.77 m (5 ft 10 in)
- Weight: 78 kg (172 lb)

Rugby union career
Senior career
Years	Team	Apps	(Points)
2019–2021	Stade Français		(0)
2021–	Lyon OU		(0)
International career
Years	Team	Apps	(Points)
2024–	France	13	(15)
National sevens team
Years	Team		Comps
2021–	France		
Medal record
Women's rugby sevens
Representing France
Olympic Games
Silver medal – second place	2020 Tokyo	Team competition
Rugby World Cup Sevens
Bronze medal – third place	2022 Cape Town	Team competition

Grace Séraphine Juvelle Okemba (born 3 December 1995) is a French rugby union and sevens player. She won a silver medal for France at the delayed 2020 Olympics and also competed at the 2024 Summer Olympics.

== Rugby career ==
Okemba played fifteens rugby for Stade Français in France. She won a silver medal with France's sevens squad at the 2020 Summer Olympics in Tokyo, Japan. She also won a bronze medal at the 2022 Rugby World Cup Sevens in Cape Town.

She competed for France at the 2024 Summer Olympics.

On 7 March 2025, she was called up into France's fifteens team for the Women's Six Nations Championship. In August, she was selected in the French side to the Women's Rugby World Cup in England.
