= Rugby sevens at the 2020 Summer Olympics – Women's tournament =

2020 Women's Olympic Rugby Sevens Tournament
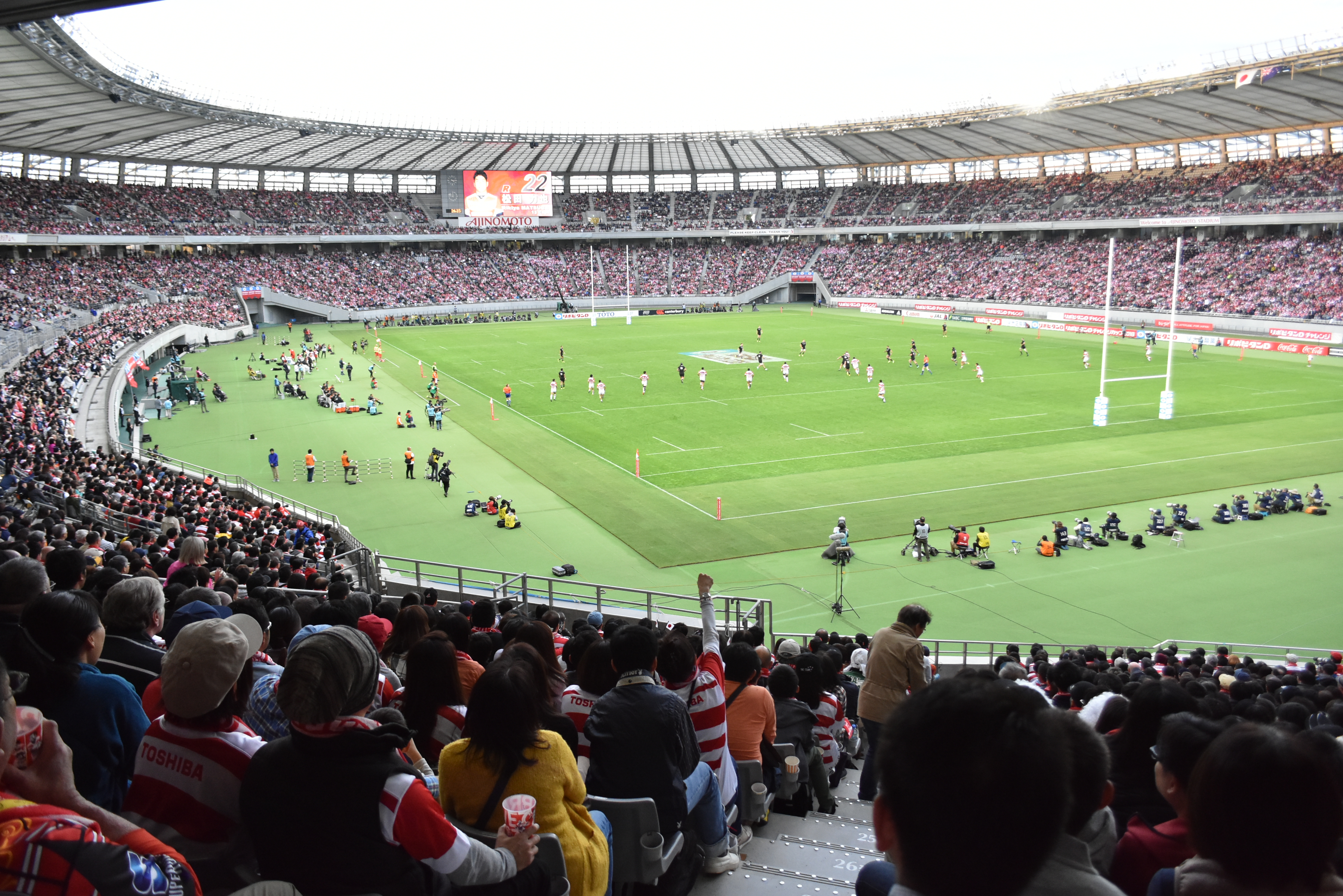
- Tokyo Stadium, where the Women's Rugby Sevens tournament was played

Tournament details
- Host: Japan
- Venue: Tokyo Stadium
- Date: 29–31 July 2021
- Teams: 12

Final positions
- Champions: New Zealand (1st title)
- Runner-up: France
- Third place: Fiji
- Fourth place: Great Britain

The women's rugby sevens tournament at the 2020 Summer Olympics was held in Japan. It was hosted at Tokyo Stadium, which also served as a host stadium of the 2019 Rugby World Cup. The tournament was played over three days from 29 to 31 July 2021.

The medals for the competition were presented by Octavian Morariu, Romania; IOC Member, and the medalists' bouquets were presented by Alan Gilpin, Great Britain; World Rugby Secretary General.

== Competition schedule ==
Legend

P	Pool Stage	PM	Placing Matches	¼	Quarter-Finals	½	Semi-Finals	B	Bronze Medal Match	F	Gold Medal Match

Schedule
	Jul 29		Jul 30			Jul 31				
Event	M	E	M	E		M		E		
Women's	P			PM	¼	PM	½	PM	B	F

== Qualification ==
Event	Dates	Location	Quotas	Qualifier
Host nation	—N/a	—N/a	1	Japan
2018–19 World Rugby Women's Sevens Series	20 October 2018 – 16 June 2019	Various	4	New Zealand
2018–19 World Rugby Women's Sevens Series	20 October 2018 – 16 June 2019	Various	4	United States
2018–19 World Rugby Women's Sevens Series	20 October 2018 – 16 June 2019	Various	4	Canada
2018–19 World Rugby Women's Sevens Series	20 October 2018 – 16 June 2019	Various	4	Australia
2019 South American Qualifying Tournament	1–2 June 2019	(Peru) Lima	1	Brazil
2019 RAN Women's Sevens	6–7 July 2019	(Cayman Islands) George Town	0 (Note: With both the United States and Canada advancing to the tournament through securing top four slots in the 2018–19 World Rugby Women's Sevens Series, the spot for the RAN champion was re-allocated, allowing the final Olympic qualifying tournament to have two teams qualify for the Olympic Games.)	—
2019 European Qualifying Tournament	13–14 July 2019	(Russia) Kazan	1	Great Britain (Note: Great Britain qualified for the Olympics through England's performance as England were the designated home nation that could earn Olympic qualification for Great Britain. Rugby sevens players from Scotland and Wales, however, were eligible to be selected for the British team at the Olympic Games.)
2019 Africa Women's Sevens	12–13 October 2019	(Tunisia) Jemmal	1	Kenya (Note: South Africa won the qualifying tournament but declined their spot due to a policy against accepting spots from continental tournaments. Kenya, as runners-up, qualified instead.)
2019 Oceania Women's Sevens Championship	7–9 November 2019	(Fiji) Suva	1	Fiji
2019 Asian Qualifying Tournament	9–10 November 2019	(China) Guangzhou	1	China
2020 Final Olympic Qualification Tournament	19–20 June 2021	Monaco	2	France
2020 Final Olympic Qualification Tournament	19–20 June 2021	Monaco	2	ROC
Total				12

- Notes:

== Group stage ==
=== Group A ===
Pos	Team	Pld	W	D	L	PF	PA	PD	Pts	Qualification
1	New Zealand	3	3	0	0	88	28	+60	9	Quarter-finals
2	Great Britain	3	2	0	1	66	38	+28	7	Quarter-finals
3	ROC	3	1	0	2	47	59	−12	5	Quarter-finals
4	Kenya	3	0	0	3	19	95	−76	3	

Source: Tokyo 2020 and World Rugby
Rules for classification: 1) Points; 2) Head-to-head result; 3) Point difference; 4) Points scored.

29 July 2021
11:00

ROC	12–14	Great Britain
Try: Khamidova 1' m Seredina 12' c Con: Seredina (1/2) 13'	(Tokyo 2020)	Try: Brown (2) 4' c, 14' +1 c Con: Aitchison (2/2) 4', 14' +1

Tokyo Stadium, Tokyo

29 July 2021
11:30

New Zealand	29–7	Kenya
Try: Fluhler 1' m Blyde (2) 3' c, 9' c Woodman 5' m Broughton 11' m Con: Nathan-Wong (2/5) 3', 9'	(Tokyo 2020)	Try: Lindo 7' +1 c Con: Okulu (1/1) 7' +1

Tokyo Stadium, Tokyo

29 July 2021
18:30

New Zealand	26–21	Great Britain
Try: Blyde (3) 5' c, 7' m, 13' c Nathan-Wong 9' c Con: Nathan-Wong (3/4) 6', 9', 14'	(Tokyo 2020)	Try: Rowland 1' c Jones 2' c Joyce 4' c Con: Aitchison (3/3) 1', 3', 4'

Tokyo Stadium, Tokyo

29 July 2021
19:00

ROC	35–12	Kenya
Try: Sozonova 2' c Seredina 4' c Shestakova 8' c Tiron 9' c Kukina 13' c Con: Seredina (4/4) 2', 4', 8', 9'; Lushina (1/1) 14'	(Tokyo 2020)	Try: Okelo (2) 5' c, 8' m Con: Ndunde (1/2) 5'

Tokyo Stadium, Tokyo

30 July 2021
11:00

Great Britain	31–0	Kenya
Try: Joyce (2) 1' c, 6' m Burton 3' m Jones 9' c Thomson 14' c Con: Hunt (1/3) 2'; Rowland (1/1) 9'; Aitchison (1/1) 14'	(Tokyo 2020)

Tokyo Stadium, Tokyo

30 July 2021
13:00 (Note: Originally scheduled for 11:30 but delayed due to weather)

New Zealand	33–0	ROC
Try: Tui (2) 1' c, 6' c Woodman 7' c Fluhler (2) 10' c, 12' m Con: Nathan-Wong (3/3) 2', 6', 7', 10; Willison (0/1)	(Tokyo 2020)

Tokyo Stadium, Tokyo

- Notes:

=== Group B ===
Pos	Team	Pld	W	D	L	PF	PA	PD	Pts	Qualification
1	France	3	3	0	0	83	10	+73	9	Quarter-finals
2	Fiji	3	2	0	1	72	29	+43	7	Quarter-finals
3	Canada	3	1	0	2	45	57	−12	5	
4	Brazil	3	0	0	3	10	114	−104	3	

Source: Tokyo 2020 and World Rugby
Rules for classification: 1) Points; 2) Head-to-head result; 3) Point difference; 4) Points scored.

29 July 2021
9:00

France	12–5	Fiji
Try: Horta 7' c Okemba 9' m Con: Drouin (1/2) 7'	(Tokyo 2020)	Try: Riwai 3' m

Tokyo Stadium, Tokyo

29 July 2021
9:30

Canada	33–0	Brazil
Try: Williams 6' c Wardley (2) 9' c, 14' +1 m Paquin 11' c Landry 13' c Con: Landry (4/5) 7', 9', 11', 13'	(Tokyo 2020)

Tokyo Stadium, Tokyo

29 July 2021
16:30

Canada	12–26	Fiji
Try: Landry 7' c Moleschi 13' m Con: Landry (1/1) 7'	(Tokyo 2020)	Try: Ulunisau (2) 1' c, 8' m Naimasi 3' c Riwai 5' c Con: Riwai (3/4) 1', 4', 6'

Tokyo Stadium, Tokyo

29 July 2021
17:00

France	40–5	Brazil
Try: Ciofani (2) 2' c, 4' m Guérin (2) 6' c, 9' c Ulutule 11' c Grassineau 14' c Con: Ulutule (2/3) 3', 7'; Izar (3/3) 9', 11', 14' +1	(Tokyo 2020)	Try: Silva 8' m Con: Kochhann (0/1)

Tokyo Stadium, Tokyo

30 July 2021
9:00

Fiji	41–5	Brazil
Try: Nakoci 4' c Ulunisau (4) 5' c, 7' m, 10' m, 12' m Naimasi 8' m Likuceva 14' c Con: Cavuru (2/4) 5', 5'; Riwai (1/3) 14'	(Tokyo 2020)	Try: Silva 2' m Con: Kochhann (0/1)

Tokyo Stadium, Tokyo

30 July 2021
9:30

Canada	0–31	France
	(Tokyo 2020)	Try: Okemba 1' c Ciofani 4' m Ulutule 7' c Neisen 11' c Jacquet 14' m Con: Ulutule (2/2) 1', 7'; Izar (1/2) 11'; Drouin (0/1)

Tokyo Stadium, Tokyo

=== Group C ===
Pos	Team	Pld	W	D	L	PF	PA	PD	Pts	Qualification
1	United States	3	3	0	0	59	33	+26	9	Quarter-finals
2	Australia	3	2	0	1	86	24	+62	7	Quarter-finals
3	China	3	1	0	2	53	54	−1	5	Quarter-finals
4	Japan (H)	3	0	0	3	7	94	−87	3	

Source: Tokyo 2020 and World Rugby
Rules for classification: 1) Points; 2) Head-to-head result; 3) Point difference; 4) Points scored.
(H) Hosts

29 July 2021
10:00

United States	28–14	China
Try: Thomas 5' c Kirshe (2) 10' c, 12' c Canett 14' c Con: Heavirland (2/2) 6', 10'; Kelter (1/1) 13'; Canett (1/1) 14'	(Tokyo 2020)	Try: Wang 3' c Chen 14' +1 c Con: Chen (1/1) 4'; Yu (1/1) 14' +1

Tokyo Stadium, Tokyo

29 July 2021
10:30

Australia	48–0	Japan
Try: Caslick 1' c Tonegato (3) 3' m, 7' +1 m, 10' m Hayes (2) 6' c, 8' c Levi (2) 11' c, 14' m Con: Williams (3/3) 1', 6', 8'; Hinds (1/2) 12'	(Tokyo 2020)

Tokyo Stadium, Tokyo

29 July 2021
17:30

Australia	26–10	China
Try: Williams 3' c Caslick 6' m Nathan 8' c Ashby 9' c Con: Williams (2/3) 3', 8'; Hinds (1/1) 9'	(Tokyo 2020)	Try: Yang 1' m Tang 13' m Con: Chen (0/1)

Tokyo Stadium, Tokyo

29 July 2021
18:00

United States	17–7	Japan
Try: Maher 1' m Matyas 4' m Ramsey 9' c Con: Canett-Oca (0/2); Heavirland (1/1) 9'	(Tokyo 2020)	Try: Koide 13' c Con: Yamanaka (1/1) 13'

Tokyo Stadium, Tokyo

30 July 2021
10:00

China	29–0	Japan
Try: Xu (2) 1' c, 5' m Wang 2' c Tang 8' m Yang 13' m Con: Chen (2/4) 1', 2'; Yu (0/1)	(Tokyo 2020)

Tokyo Stadium, Tokyo

30 July 2021
10:30

Australia	12–14	United States
Try: Williams 5' c Hayes 8' m Con: Williams (1/2) 6'	(Tokyo 2020)	Try: Emba 9' c Gustaitis 11' c Con: Heavirland (2/2) 10', 11'

Tokyo Stadium, Tokyo

=== Ranking of third-placed teams ===
The top two of the third-placed teams advance to the knockout rounds.

Pos	Grp	Team	Pld	W	D	L	PF	PA	PD	Pts	Qualification
1	C	China	3	1	0	2	53	54	−1	5	Quarter-finals
2	A	ROC	3	1	0	2	47	59	−12	5	Quarter-finals
3	B	Canada	3	1	0	2	45	57	−12	5	

Source: Tokyo 2020 and World Rugby
Rules for classification: 1) Points; 2) Point difference; 3) Points scored.

== Knockout stage ==
=== 9–12th place playoff ===
9–12th semi-finals
30 July – Tokyo Stadium
Canada	45
Brazil	0
30 July – Tokyo Stadium
Kenya	21
Japan	17

9th place match
31 July – Tokyo Stadium
Canada	24
Kenya	10
11th place match
31 July – Tokyo Stadium
Brazil	21
Japan	12

30 July 2021
16:30

Canada	45–0	Brazil
Try: Williams (3) 2' c, 6' m, 10' c Paquin (2) 7' c, 8' c Benn 8' c Greenshields 14' c Con: Landry (4/6) 3', 8', 9', 10'; Nicholas (1/1) 14'	(Tokyo 2020)

Tokyo Stadium, Tokyo

30 July 2021
17:00

Kenya	21–17	Japan
Try: Okulu 3' c Omondi 7' c Atieno 14' +1 c Con: Okulu (3/3) 3', 8', 14' +1	(Tokyo 2020)	Try: Hara 1' m Koide 8' m Kajiki 10' c Con: Yamanaka (1/3) 10'

Tokyo Stadium, Tokyo

31 July 2021
9:00

Brazil	21–12	Japan
Try: Kochhann 2' c Silva 7' c Fioravanti 13' c Con: Cerullo (2/2) 2', 7'; Kochhann (1/1) 13'	(Tokyo 2020)	Try: Hirotsu 3' c Hara 6' m Con: Yamanaka (1/2) 4'

Tokyo Stadium, Tokyo

31 July 2021
9:30

Canada	24–10	Kenya
Try: Williams 1' c Farella 3' m, 8' m Landry 10' c Con: Landry (2/3) 1', 10'; Nicholas (0/1)	(Tokyo 2020)	Try: Okello 5' m Ochieng 13' m Con: Okulu (0/2)

Tokyo Stadium, Tokyo

=== 5–8th place playoff ===
5–8th semi-finals
31 July – Tokyo Stadium
ROC	7
Australia	35
31 July – Tokyo Stadium
United States	33
China	14

5th place match
31 July – Tokyo Stadium
Australia	17
United States	7
7th place match
31 July – Tokyo Stadium
ROC	10
China	22

31 July 2021
10:00

ROC	7–35	Australia
Try: Zdrokova 7' c Con: Seredina (1/1) 8'	(Tokyo 2020)	Try: Nathan 1' c Tonegato 3' c, 9' c Paki 12' c Levi 14' c Con: Hinds (3/3) 2', 4', 9'; Williams (2/2) 12', 14'

Tokyo Stadium, Tokyo

31 July 2021
10:30

United States	33–14	China
Try: Thomas 1' c, 3' c Tapper 6' c Maher 10' m, 14' c Con: Heavirland (4/5) 1', 3', 7', 14'	(Tokyo 2020)	Try: Wang 1' c Chen 9' c Con: Chen (2/2) 2', 9'

Tokyo Stadium, Tokyo

31 July 2021
16:30

ROC	10–22	China
Try: Tiron 3' m Seredina 5' m Con: Seredina (0/2)	(Tokyo 2020)	Try: Wang 7' m Yang 8' c Xu 9' m Chen 12' m Con: Chen (1/4) 8'

Tokyo Stadium, Tokyo

31 July 2021
17:00

Australia	17–7	United States
Try: Nathan 5' m Ashby 8' m Hayes 12' c Con: Williams (0/2); Hinds (1/1) 12'	(Tokyo 2020)	Try: Kirshe 10' c Con: Heavirland (1/1) 10'

Tokyo Stadium, Tokyo

=== Medal playoff ===
Quarter-finals
30 July – Tokyo Stadium
New Zealand	36
ROC	0
30 July – Tokyo Stadium
Fiji	14
Australia	12
30 July – Tokyo Stadium
United States	12
Great Britain	21
30 July – Tokyo Stadium
France	24
China	10

Semi-finals
31 July – Tokyo Stadium
New Zealand (a.e.t.)	22
Fiji	17
31 July – Tokyo Stadium
Great Britain	19
France	26

Gold medal match
31 July – Tokyo Stadium
New Zealand	26
France	12
Bronze medal match
31 July – Tokyo Stadium
Fiji	21
Great Britain	12

==== Quarter-finals ====
30 July 2021
17:30

New Zealand	36–0	ROC
Try: Fitzpatrick 1' c Broughton 2' c Blyde 4' c Woodman (2) 8' c, 13' m Tui 10' c Con: Nathan-Wong (2/4) 1', 8'; Pouri-Lane (1/2) 10'	(Tokyo 2020)

Tokyo Stadium, Tokyo

30 July 2021
18:30 (Note: Matches were delayed by 30 minutes due to lightning in the area)

Fiji	14–12	Australia
Try: Nakoci 1' c Naimasi 3' c Con: Riwai (2/2) 1', 3'	(Tokyo 2020)	Try: Nathan 6' m Caslick 13' c Con: Williams (0/1); Hinds (1/1) 13'

Tokyo Stadium, Tokyo

30 July 2021
19:00

United States	12–21	Great Britain
Try: Kirshe 11' m Tapper 14' c Con: Heavirland (1/2) 14'	(Tokyo 2020)	Try: Joyce (2) 1' c, 8' c Brown 2' c Con: Aitchison (3/3) 1', 2', 8'

Tokyo Stadium, Tokyo

30 July 2021
19:30

France	24–10	China
Try: Okemba (2) 4' c, 10' m Drouin 6' m Ciofani 9' c Con: Ulutule (2/2) 4', 9'; Drouin (0/1); Izar (0/1)	(Tokyo 2020)	Try: Tang (2) 1' m, 12' m Con: Chen (0/2)

Tokyo Stadium, Tokyo

==== Semi-finals ====
31 July 2021
11:00

New Zealand	22–17 (a.e.t.)	Fiji
Try: Broughton (2) 2' m, 16' m Woodman 10' c Fluhler 14' m Con: Nathan-Wong (1/3) 11'	(Tokyo 2020)	Try: Solikoviti 4' c, 9' m Ulunisau 14+' m Con: Riwai (1/3) 4'

Tokyo Stadium, Tokyo

31 July 2021
11:30

Great Britain	19–26	France
Try: Joyce (2) 5' c, 7' m Smith 11' c Con: Aitchison (1/2) 6'; Hunt (1/1) 11'	(Tokyo 2020)	Try: Ciofani (2) 1' c, 8' m Okemba 3' c Bertrand 7' c Con: Drouin (2/3) 2', 3'; Ulutule (1/1) 7', 9'

Tokyo Stadium, Tokyo

==== Bronze medal match ====
31 July 2021
17:30

Fiji	21–12	Great Britain
Try: Nakoci 1' c, 6' c Ulunisau 10' c Con: Riwai (3/3) 1', 6', 10'	(Tokyo 2020)	Try: Jones 9' m, 12' c Con: Aitchison (0/1); Hunt (1/1) 12'

Tokyo Stadium, Tokyo

==== Gold medal match ====
31 July 2021
18:00

New Zealand	26–12	France
Try: Blyde 1' c Broughton 5' m Fluhler 6' c Nathan-Wong 11' c Con: Nathan-Wong (3/4) 1', 7', 11'	(Tokyo 2020)	Try: Drouin 3' m Ciofani 8' c Con: Drouin (1/2) 9'

Tokyo Stadium, Tokyo

Team details

New Zealand
France

- Notes:

== Final ranking ==
Rank	Team	Matches	Points	Avg points	Tries	Avg tries
1st place, gold medalist(s)	New Zealand	6	172	28.67	28	4.67
2nd place, silver medalist(s)	France	6	145	24.17	23	3.83
3rd place, bronze medalist(s)	Fiji	6	124	20.67	20	3.33
4	Great Britain	6	118	19.67	18	3.00
5	Australia	6	150	25.00	24	4.00
6	United States	6	111	18.50	17	2.83
7	China	6	99	16.50	17	2.83
8	ROC	6	64	10.67	10	1.67
9	Canada	5	114	22.80	18	3.60
10	Kenya	5	50	10.00	8	1.60
11	Brazil	5	31	6.20	5	1.00
12	Japan	5	36	7.20	6	1.20
