= Kristina Seredina =

Russian rugby sevens player

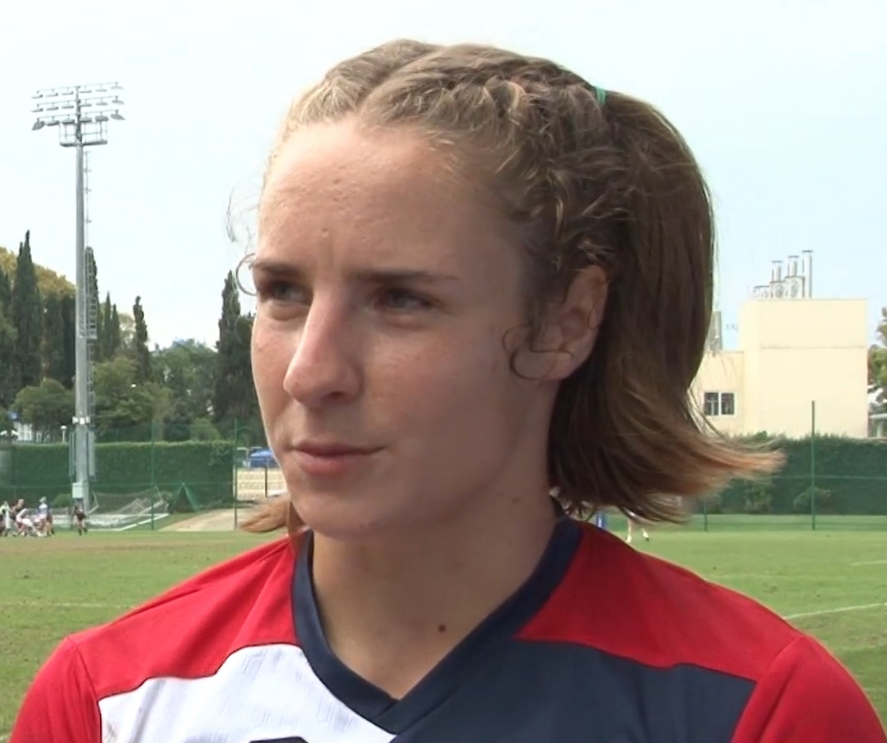
- Seredina in 2018
- Full name: Kristina Sergeevna Seredina
- Born: 24 December 1994 (age 31) Taraz, Kazakhstan
- Height: 1.68 m (5 ft 6 in)
- Weight: 70 kg (154 lb)

Rugby union career
International career
Years	Team	Apps	(Points)
2016	Russia		
National sevens team
Years	Team		Comps
2014–Present	Russia		158 (308 pts)

Kristina Sergeevna Seredina (Russian: Кристина Сергеевна Середина; born 24 December 1994) is a Russian rugby sevens player. She competed in the women's tournament at the 2020 Summer Olympics.
