= 2020 Men's Rugby Sevens Final Olympic Qualification Tournament =

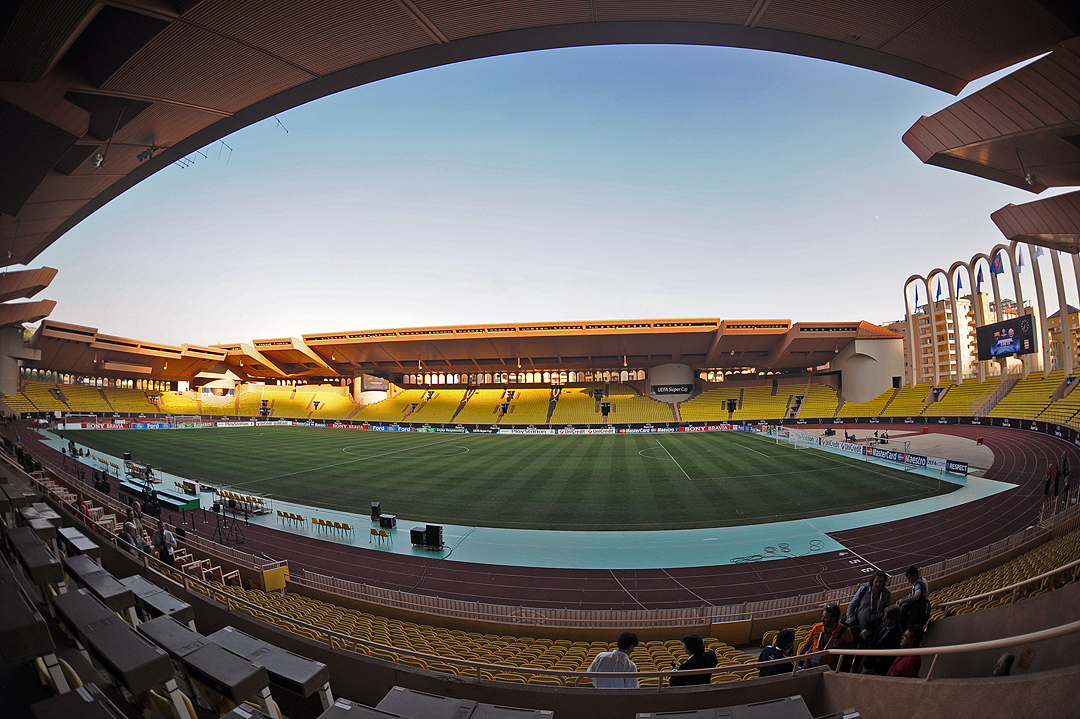
- The tournament venue, Stade Louis II.
- Hosts: Monaco
- Date: 18–20 June 2021
- Nations: 9

Final positions
- Champions: Ireland
- Runners-up: France

Series details
- Top try scorer: Jordan Conroy (11)

The final qualification repechage tournament for men's rugby sevens at the 2020 Summer Olympics was held on 18–20 June 2021 at Stade Louis II in Monaco. The tournament was originally scheduled for a year earlier, but was postponed until 2021 due to the global COVID-19 pandemic.

Twelve men's teams were eligible to compete in the repechage tournament, being the second and third ranked teams from the six continental qualifiers. Two teams, Brazil and China, withdrew a month before the competition due to challenges presented by the COVID-19 pandemic. A third team, Uganda, had to withdraw after members of their squad recorded positive COVID-19 test results on arrival in Monaco. This reduced the number of teams competing to nine.

Ireland won the repechage tournament, defeating France by 28–19 in the final, to qualify for the men's sevens tournament at the Tokyo Olympics.

== Teams ==
Event	Dates	Location	Quota	Qualifier
2019 South American Qualifying Tournament	29–30 June 2019	(Chile) Santiago	2	~~Brazil~~ (Note: Brazil and China withdrew a month before the tournament due to challenges presented by the global COVID-19 pandemic.)
2019 South American Qualifying Tournament	29–30 June 2019	(Chile) Santiago	2	Chile
2019 RAN Sevens	6–7 July 2019	(Cayman Islands) George Town	2	Jamaica
2019 RAN Sevens	6–7 July 2019	(Cayman Islands) George Town	2	Mexico
2019 Rugby Europe Sevens Olympic Qualifying Tournament	13–14 July 2019	(France) Colomiers	2	France
2019 Rugby Europe Sevens Olympic Qualifying Tournament	13–14 July 2019	(France) Colomiers	2	Ireland
2019 Oceania Sevens Championship	7–9 November 2019	(Fiji) Suva	2	Samoa
2019 Oceania Sevens Championship	7–9 November 2019	(Fiji) Suva	2	Tonga
2019 Africa Men's Sevens	8–9 November 2019	(South Africa) Johannesburg	2	~~Uganda~~ (Note: Uganda was a late withdrawal from the tournament following positive COVID-19 test results from the squad on arrival in Monaco.)
2019 Africa Men's Sevens	8–9 November 2019	(South Africa) Johannesburg	2	Zimbabwe
2019 Asia Rugby Sevens Olympic Qualifying Tournament	23–24 November 2019	(South Korea) Incheon	2	~~China~~
2019 Asia Rugby Sevens Olympic Qualifying Tournament	23–24 November 2019	(South Korea) Incheon	2	Hong Kong
Total				9 teams

- Notes:

== Pool stage ==
The teams were drawn into two pools with each team playing against all opponents in their own pool. Due to the late withdrawal of Uganda, all matches involving them were recorded as a bye for their opponents in Pool B.

=== Pool A ===
Team	Pld	W	D	L	PF	PA	PD	Pts
Ireland (Q)	4	4	0	0	126	17	+109	12
Samoa (Q)	4	3	0	1	156	38	+118	10
Zimbabwe	4	2	0	2	64	81	−17	8
Tonga	4	1	0	3	43	128	−85	6
Mexico	4	0	0	4	17	142	−125	4

18 June 2021
18:00

Zimbabwe	21–0	Mexico
Try: Magaramombe 4'c Muneta 11'c Phiri 13'c Con: Musumhi (2/2) 4', 12'; Mangongo (1/1) 13'	Report

Stade Louis II, Monaco
Referee: Finlay Brown (Scotland)

19 June 2021
9:28

Samoa	69–5	Mexico
Try: Apelu Maliko 1'c Rimoni (2) 2'c, 8'm Scanlan (2) 3'c, 4'c Falaniko (3) 6'c, 9'c, 11'm Afa 8'm Tavita 10'm Sapeti 13'c Con: Matavao (6/9) 1', 3', 3', 4', 7', 10'; Falaniko (1/2) 14'	Report	Try: Sámano 7'm Con: Rodríguez (0/1); Cards: Guerrero (yellow card) 2' to 4'

Stade Louis II, Monaco

19 June 2021
9:50

Ireland	31–10	Zimbabwe
Try: Conroy (2) 0'c, 3'm Kennedy (3) 4'c, 5'c, 7'm Con: Dardis (3/5) 1', 5', 7'	Report	Try: Mavara 10'm Boshi 14'm Con: Musumhi (0/2)

Stade Louis II, Monaco

19 June 2021
12:12

Ireland	31–0	Mexico
Try: Kennedy (2) 2'c, 6'c Conroy 4'c Fitzpatrick (2) 7'm, 9'm Con: Cribbin (3/5) 2', 4', 7'	Report

Stade Louis II, Monaco
Referee: Sam Grove-White (Scotland)

19 June 2021
12:34

Samoa	47–5	Tonga
Try: Apelu Maliko (2) 1'c, 9'c Milford 6'c Rimoni (2) 7'c, 10'c Falaniko 12'c Tapeneko 13'm Con: Matavao (1/1) 2'; Falaniko (4/4) 7', 7', 11', 12'; Apelu Maliko (1/1) 8'; Leitufia (0/1)	Report	Try: Taumoepeau 4'm Con: Halaifonua (0/1)

Stade Louis II, Monaco
Referee: Craig Evans (Wales)

19 June 2021
15:24

Ireland	43–0	Tonga
Try: Kennedy (3) 1'm, 5'm, 7'c McNulty 3'm Conroy (3) 7'c, 10'c, 11'c Con: Cribbin (4/7) 7', 7', 11', 12'	Report

Stade Louis II, Monaco
Referee: Paulo Duarte (Portugal)

19 June 2021
17:39

Samoa	33–7	Zimbabwe
Try: Apelu Maliko (2) 0'c, 3'c Matavao 4'c Falaniko (2) 6'c, 12'm Con: Matavao (4/5) 1', 3', 4', 6'; Cards: Rimoni (yellow card) 4' to 6'	Report	Try: Musumhi 7'c Con: Musumhi (1/1) 7'; Cards: Mangongo (yellow card) 10' to 12'

Stade Louis II, Monaco
Referee: Sam Grove-White (Scotland)

19 June 2021
18:01

Tonga	21–12	Mexico
Try: Vaea 5'c Taufa 7'c Fekitoa 13'c Con: Fekitoa (2/2) 5', 7'; Halaifonua (1/1); Cards: Vaea (yellow card) 0' to 2'	Report	Try: Chávez 3'm Sámano 6'c Con: Rodríguez (1/2) 7'

Stade Louis II, Monaco
Referee: Richard Haughton (England)

20 June 2021
12:55

Tonga	17–26	Zimbabwe
Try: Manu 0'm Timani 5'm Kilioni 10'c Con: Halaifonua (1/1) 10'; Fekitoa (0/1); Ram (0/1)	Report	Try: Mangongo (2) 6'c, 12'c Mashawi 7'c Katsvere 7'm Con: Musumhi (3/4) 6', 7', 12'

Stade Louis II, Monaco
Referee: Sam Grove-White (Scotland)

20 June 2021
13:17

Samoa	7–21	Ireland
Try: Falaniko 8'c Con: Matavao (1/1) 8'	Report	Try: Horan 4'c Conroy 7'c Kelly 9'c Con: Dardis (3/3) 4', 7', 9'

Stade Louis II, Monaco
Referee: Craig Evans (Wales)

=== Pool B ===
Team	Pld	W	D	L	PF	PA	PD	Pts
France (Q)	3	3	0	0	119	12	+107	9
Hong Kong (Q)	3	2	0	1	62	56	+6	7
Chile	3	1	0	2	53	74	–21	5
Jamaica	3	0	0	3	10	102	–92	3

19 June 2021
10:12

France	40–0	Jamaica
Try: Siega 5'c Zeghdar 6'c Barraque 8'c Laugel 9'c Valleau 11'm Bouhraoua 13'c Con: Barraque (5/6) 5', 7', 9', 10', 13'; Cards: Veredamu (yellow card) 13' to 14'	Report

Stade Louis II, Monaco
Referee: Craig Evans (Wales)

19 June 2021
12:56

Hong Kong	31–5	Jamaica
Try: Yiu (2) 1'm, 7'c Woodward 5'm McQueen 7'c Hood 10'c Con: Webb (2/4) 7', 8'; Hood (1/1) 10'	Report	Try: Caton-Brown 3'm Con: Adamson (0/1)

Stade Louis II, Monaco
Referee: Finlay Brown (Scotland)

19 June 2021
13:18

France	43–7	Chile
Try: Siega (2) 3'm, 6'c Zeghdar 4'c Barraque 7'c Mignot (2) 10'm, 12'c Laugel 14'm Con: Barraque (4/7) 5', 6', 7', 12'	Report	Try: Huici 7'c Con: Tredinick (1/1) 7'

Stade Louis II, Monaco
Referee: Paulo Duarte (Portugal)

19 June 2021
15:46

Hong Kong	26–15	Chile
Try: Morrison 1'c Yiu 11'c Webb 12'c McQueen 13'm Con: Webb (3/4) 2', 12', 13'; Cards: Woodward (yellow card) 5' to 7'	Report	Try: De Vidts 5'm Huici 7'm Jana 7'm Con: Strabucchi (0/3)

Stade Louis II, Monaco
Referee: Richard Haughton (England)

19 June 2021
18:45

Chile	31–5	Jamaica
Try: Edwards 1'm Huici 5'c Brangier 7'c Goñi 9'm Blanc 12'c Con: Tredinick (2/4) 6', 7'; Strabucchi (1/1) 13'	Report	Try: Caton-Brown 3'm Con: Adamson (0/1)

Stade Louis II, Monaco
Referee: Adam Jones (Wales)

20 June 2021
14:01

France	36–5	Hong Kong
Try: Parez 2'c Mignot 5'm Riva 6'c Laugel 8'm Siega 12'c O'Connor 13'm Con: Riva (1/1) 3'; Jean-Pascal Barraque (2/5) 6', 12'; Cards: Veredamu (yellow card) 3' to 5'	Report	Try: Denmark 9'm Con: Webb (0/1)

Stade Louis II, Monaco
Referee: Paulo Duarte (Portugal)

== Combined standings ==
After completion of the pool stage, the top two teams from each pool progressed to the knockout stage, with the winner of the final gaining qualification for the Olympic Sevens in Tokyo. Seedings for the knockouts were based on (a) pool placing, (b) competition points awarded (for a win, draw or loss) in the respective pool standings, and (c) difference between points scored and conceded across all pool matches played.

#	Team	Place	Pld	−/+	Pts
1	Ireland	1st A	4	+109	12
2	France	1st B	3	+107	9
3	Samoa	2nd A	4	+118	10
4	Hong Kong	2nd B	3	+6	7
5	Zimbabwe	3rd A	4	–17	8
6	Chile	3rd B	3	–21	5
7	Tonga	4th A	4	–85	6
8	Jamaica	4th B	3	–92	3
9	Mexico	5th A	4	–125	4

Key
Semi-finalists	Eliminated
1st placed in pool	3rd placed in pool
2nd placed in pool	4th placed in pool
	5th placed in pool

== Knockout stage ==
Semi-finals
20 June 16:23
France	31
Samoa	0
20 June 16:45
Ireland	28
Hong Kong	5

Final
20 June 19:07
France	19
Ireland	28

=== Semi-finals ===
20 June
16:23

France	31–0	Samoa
Try: Barraque (2) 3'c, 4'm Bouhraoua (2) 7'c, 13'c Siega 8'm Con: Barraque (2/4) 4', 7'; Parez (1/1) 14'	Report

Stade Louis II, Monaco
Referee: Sam Grove-White (Scotland)

20 June
16:45

Ireland	28–5	Hong Kong
Try: Conroy (2) 0'c, 5'c Horan 2'c McNulty 7'c Con: Dardis (4/4) 0', 2', 5', 8'	Report	Try: Herbert 12'm Con: McQueen (0/1)

Stade Louis II, Monaco
Referee: Paulo Duarte (Portugal)

=== Final ===
20 June
19:07

France	19–28	Ireland
Try: Parez 5'c Riva 6'm Bouhraoua 14'c Con: Barraque (2/3) 5', 14'	Report	Try: Kennedy 0'c Conroy (2) 9'c, 10'c McNulty 13'c Con: Dardis (4/4) 1', 9', 11', 14'

Stade Louis II, Monaco
Referee: Craig Evans (Wales)

== Placings ==
Legend
Qualified to 2020 Summer Olympics

Rank	Team
1	Ireland
2	France
3	Samoa
3	Hong Kong
5	Zimbabwe
6	Chile
6	Tonga
8	Jamaica
8	Mexico

== See also ==
- 2020 Women's Rugby Sevens Final Olympic Qualification Tournament
