= 2018 Rugby Europe Sevens Grand Prix Series =

- Hosts: Russia; France; England; Poland
- Date: 19 May – 8 September

Final positions
- Champions: Ireland
- Runners-up: Germany
- Third: Russia

Series details
- Top try scorer: (Ireland) Terry Kennedy (23)

The 2018 Rugby Europe Sevens Grand Prix Series serves as a qualifying tournament for the 2019 Hong Kong Sevens qualifier. The three top placing 2018-2019 non-core World Series teams — Ireland, Germany, and Russia — advance to the 2019 Hong Kong Sevens qualification tournament. Ireland won the series, winning three out of the four tournaments.

The non-hosting team with the fewest points — Sweden — is relegated to the 2019 Trophy tournament.

== Schedule ==
Date	Venue	Winner	Runner-up	Third
19–20 May	(Russia) Moscow	Ireland	Germany	Italy
30 June – 1 July	(France) Marcoussis	Ireland	Germany	England
7–8 July	(England) Exeter	England	Russia	Ireland
8–9 September	(Poland) Łódź	Ireland	Germany	Portugal
Overall		Ireland	Germany	Russia

== Standings ==
Legend
Top 2018-2019 non-core teams qualify to 2019 Hong Kong Sevens qualifier
Relegated to 2019 Trophy

Rank	Team	Moscow	Marcoussis	Exeter	Łódź	Points
1st place, gold medalist(s)	Ireland	20	20	16	20	76
2nd place, silver medalist(s)	Germany	18	18	6	18	60
3rd place, bronze medalist(s)	Russia ⍻	12	14	18	12	56
4	England ✓	10	16	20	8	54
5	Portugal	6	12	14	16	48
6	France ✓	14	10	8	14	46
7	Italy	16	8	3	3	30
8	Wales ✓	4	6	12	2	24
9	Spain ✓	8	2	4	10	24
10	Georgia	2	3	10	4	19
11	Sweden	3	1	1	6	11
12	Poland*	1	4	2	1	8

⍻ Russia started this series as a World Series core team but lost its core status at the 2018 Paris Sevens on June 10, 2018.

✓ indicates 2018-2019 World Series core nation

* Poland cannot be relegated due to being a host nation

== Moscow ==
Event	Winners	Score	Finalists	Semifinalists
Cup	Ireland	28–7	Germany	Italy (Third); France
Plate	Russia	29–10	England	Spain (Seventh); Portugal
Bowl	Wales	26–12	Sweden	Georgia (Eleventh); Poland

=== Pool Stage ===
==== Pool A ====
Team	Pld	W	D	L	PF	PA	PD	Pts
Russia	3	3	0	0	57	10	+47	9
France	3	2	0	1	50	36	+14	7
Sweden	3	1	0	2	34	55	–21	5
Georgia	3	0	0	3	24	64	–40	3

19 May 2018	France	21–12	Georgia
10:28				Referee: Andrea Spadoni (Italy)

19 May 2018	Russia	24–0	Sweden
10:50				Referee: Mike English (Wales)

19 May 2018	France	19–10	Sweden
13:13				Referee: David Wilkinson (Ireland)

19 May 2018	Russia	19–0	Georgia
13:35				Referee: Kevin Sulejmani (Belgium)

19 May 2018	Georgia	12–24	Sweden
15:58				Referee: George Kopp (Russia)

19 May 2018	Russia	14–10	France
16:20				Referee: Richard Haughton (England)

==== Pool B ====
Team	Pld	W	D	L	PF	PA	PD	Pts
Ireland	3	3	0	0	97	0	+97	9
Portugal	3	2	0	1	42	47	–5	7
Germany	3	1	0	2	48	54	–6	5
Poland	3	0	0	3	12	98	–86	3

19 May 2018	Ireland	29–0	Poland
9:44

19 May 2018	Germany	0–21	Portugal
10:06

19 May 2018	Ireland	35–0	Portugal
12:29				Referee: Richard Haughton (England)

19 May 2018	Germany	48–0	Poland
12:51				Referee: Mike English (Wales)

19 May 2018	Portugal	21–12	Poland
15:14				Referee: Andrea Spadoni (Italy)

19 May 2018	Ireland	33–0	Germany
15:36				Referee: Mike English (Wales)

==== Pool C ====
Team	Pld	W	D	L	PF	PA	PD	Pts
England	3	2	0	1	0	0	+6	7
Italy	3	2	0	1	0	0	+16	7
Spain	3	1	0	2	0	0	+7	5
Wales	3	1	0	2	0	0	–29	5

19 May 2018	Spain	5–12	Italy
9:00				Referee: Richard Haughton (England)

19 May 2018	Wales	21–14	England
9:22				Referee: David Wilkinson (Ireland)

19 May 2018	Spain	19–22	England
11:45				Referee: Andrea Spadoni (Italy)

19 May 2018	Wales	0–19	Italy
12:07				Referee: George Kopp (Russia)

19 May 2018	England	17–7	Italy
14:30				Referee: David Wilkinson (Ireland)

19 May 2018	Spain	22–5	Wales
14:52				Referee: Kevin Sulejmani (Belgium)

=== Knockout stage ===
==== Challenge Trophy ====
Semi-finals
20 May 2018 – 10:28 – Oktyabr Stadium
Sweden	12
Poland	10
20 May 2018 – 10:50 – Oktyabr Stadium
Wales	26
Georgia	7

Final
20 May 2018 – 14:05 – Oktyabr Stadium
Sweden	12
Wales	26
Eleventh Place
20 May 2018 – 13:43 – Oktyabr Stadium
Poland	7
Georgia	34

==== 5th Place ====
Semi-finals
20 May 2018 – 12:15 – Oktyabr Stadium
Russia	24
Portugal	7
20 May 2018 – 12:37 – Oktyabr Stadium
Spain	0
England	14

Final
20 May 2018 – 15:24 – Oktyabr Stadium
Russia	29
England	10
Seventh Place
20 May 2018 – 15:02 – Oktyabr Stadium
Portugal	7
Spain	17

==== Cup ====
Quarter-finals
20 May 2018 – 9:00 – Oktyabr Stadium
Russia	5
Germany	12
20 May 2018 – 10:06 – Oktyabr Stadium
Portugal	7
Italy	14
20 May 2018 – 9:44 – Oktyabr Stadium
England	5
France	14
20 May 2018 – 9:22 – Oktyabr Stadium
Ireland	26
Spain	0

Semi-finals
20 May 2018 – 12:58 – Oktyabr Stadium
Germany	22
Italy	7
20 May 2018 – 13:21 – Oktyabr Stadium
Ireland	31
France	0

Final
20 May 2018 – 16:11 – Oktyabr Stadium
Germany	7
Ireland	28
Third place
20 May 2018 – 15:49 – Oktyabr Stadium
Italy	14
France	5

== Marcoussis ==
Event	Winners	Score	Finalists	Semifinalists
Cup	Ireland	49–7	Germany	England (Third); Russia
Plate	Portugal	17-12	France	Italy (Seventh); Wales
Bowl	Poland	19-10	Georgia	Spain (Eleventh); Sweden

=== Pool Stage ===
==== Pool A ====
Team	Pld	W	D	L	PF	PA	PD	Pts
Ireland	3	3	0	0	113	14	+99	9
England	3	2	0	1	90	35	+55	7
Poland	3	1	0	2	28	116	–88	5
Spain	3	0	0	3	26	92	–66	3

30 June 2018	Ireland	52–0	Poland
9:00

30 June 2018	England	31–7	Spain
9:22

30 June 2018	Ireland	40–0	Spain
13:44

30 June 2018	England	45–7	Poland
14:06

30 June 2018	Ireland	21–14	England
18:28

30 June 2018	Spain	19–21	Poland
18:50

==== Pool B ====
Team	Pld	W	D	L	PF	PA	PD	Pts
Germany	3	3	0	0	17	10	+43	9
Russia	3	2	0	1	21	10	+32	7
Portugal	3	1	0	2	10	21	–15	5
Georgia	3	0	0	3	10	17	–60	3

30 June 2018	Germany	17–10	Georgia
9:44

30 June 2018	Russia	21–10	Portugal
10:06

30 June 2018	Germany	38–5	Portugal
14:28

30 June 2018	Russia	38–14	Georgia
14:50

30 June 2018	Germany	17–14	Russia
19:12

30 June 2018	Portugal	36–7	Georgia
19:34

==== Pool C ====
Team	Pld	W	D	L	PF	PA	PD	Pts
France	3	3	0	0	136	12	+124	9
Wales	3	1	0	2	39	80	-41	7
Italy	3	1	0	2	67	51	+31	5
Sweden	3	0	0	3	17	116	–99	3

30 June 2018	Italy	36–5	Sweden
10:28

30 June 2018	France	49–0	Wales
10:50

30 June 2018	Italy	19–22	Wales
15:12

30 June 2018	France	63–0	Sweden
15:34

30 June 2018	Wales	17–12	Sweden
19:56

30 June 2018	Italy	12–24	France
20:18

=== Knockout stage ===
==== Challenge Trophy ====
Semi-finals
1 July 2018 – 11:28
Poland	19
Sweden	12
1 July 2018 – 11:50
Georgia	21
Spain	17

Final
1 July 2018 – 15:05
Poland	19
Georgia	10
Eleventh Place
1 July 2018 – 14:43
Sweden	19
Spain	29

==== 5th Place ====
Semi-finals
1 July 2018 – 13:15
Portugal	38
Wales	12
1 July 2018 – 13:37
Italy	12
France	38

Final
1 July 2018
Portugal	17
France	12
Seventh Place
1 July 2018
Wales	21
Italy	24

==== Cup ====
Quarter-finals
1 July 2018 – 10:00
Ireland	17
Portugal	12
1 July 2018 – 11:06
Russia	26
Wales	14
1 July 2018 – 10:22
Germany	24
Italy	0
1 July 2018 – 10:44
France	21
England	26

Semi-finals
1 July 2018 – 13:59
Ireland	35
Russia	0
1 July 2018 – 14:21
Germany	12
England	10

Final
1 July 2018 – 17:11
Ireland	49
Germany	7
Third place
1 July 2018 – 16:49
Russia	12
England	26

== Exeter ==
Event	Winners	Score	Finalists	Semifinalists
Cup	England	15-5	Russia	Ireland (Bronze); Portugal
Plate	Wales	26-21	Georgia	France (7th); Germany
Bowl	Spain	24-7	Italy	Poland (11th); Sweden

=== Pool Stage ===
==== Pool A ====
Team	Pld	W	D	L	PF	PA	PD	Pts
Ireland	3	3	0	0	119	12	+107	9
France	3	2	0	1	55	57	–2	7
Italy	3	1	0	2	52	79	–25	5
Sweden	3	0	0	2	26	93	–67	3

7 July 2018	Ireland	43-0	Sweden
11:30

7 July 2018	France	31-12	Italy
11:52

7 July 2018	Ireland	43-7	Italy
14:15

7 July 2018	France	19-12	Sweden
14:37

7 July 2018	Ireland	33-5	France
17:00

7 July 2018	Italy	31-14	Sweden
17:22

==== Pool B ====
Team	Pld	W	D	L	PF	PA	PD	Pts
Wales	3	3	0	0	0	0	0	9
Germany	3	2	0	1	0	0	0	7
Portugal	3	1	0	2	0	0	0	5
Spain	3	0	0	3	0	0	0	3

7 July 2018	Germany	31-15	Spain
12:14

7 July 2018	Portugal	19-24	Wales
12:36

7 July 2018	Germany	12-17	Wales
14:59

7 July 2018	Portugal	31-7	Spain
15:21

7 July 2018	Germany	21–17	Portugal
17:44

7 July 2018	Wales	28–5	Spain
18:06

==== Pool C ====
Team	Pld	W	D	L	PF	PA	PD	Pts
Russia	3	3	0	0	0	0	0	9
England	3	2	0	1	0	0	0	7
Georgia	3	1	0	2	0	0	0	5
Poland	3	0	0	3	0	0	0	3

7 July 2018	Russia	43-12	Poland
12:58

7 July 2018	England	43-5	Georgia
13:20

7 July 2018	Russia	19-7	Georgia
15:43

7 July 2018	England	19-12	Poland
16:05

7 July 2018	Poland	5–38	Georgia
18:28

7 July 2018	England	14–27	Russia
18:50

=== Knockout stage ===
==== Challenge Trophy ====
Semi-finals
8 July 2018 – 12:58 – Sandy Park
Italy	19
Poland	12
8 July 2018 – 13:20 – Sandy Park
Spain	25
Sweden	7

Final
8 July 2018 – 16:35 – Sandy Park
Italy	7
Spain	24
Eleventh Place
8 July 2018 – 16:13 – Sandy Park
Poland	26
Sweden	12

==== 5th Place ====
Semi-finals
8 July 2018 – 14:45 – Sandy Park
Georgia	36
Germany	17
8 July 2018 – 15:07 – Sandy Park
Wales	36
France	14

Final
8 July 2018 – 17:54 – Sandy Park
Georgia	21
Wales	26
Seventh Place
8 July 2018 – 17:32 – Sandy Park
Germany	12
France	17

==== Cup ====
Quarter-finals
8 July 2018 – 11:30 – Sandy Park
Ireland	22
Georgia	12
8 July 2018 – 12:14 – Sandy Park
England	31
Germany	10
8 July 2018 – 12:36 – Sandy Park
Wales	14
Portugal	21
8 July 2018 – 11:52 – Sandy Park
Russia	42
France	0

Semi-finals
8 July 2018 – 15:29 – Sandy Park
Ireland	19
England	31
8 July 2018 – 15:51 – Sandy Park
Portugal	14
Russia	17

Final
8 July 2018 – 18:16 – Sandy Park
England	15
Russia	5
Third place
8 July 2018 – 18:38 – Sandy Park
Ireland	29
Portugal	7

== Łódź ==
Event	Winners	Score	Finalists	Semifinalists
Cup	Ireland	35–5	Germany	Portugal (Third); France
Plate	Russia	26-17	Spain	England (Seventh); Sweden
Bowl	Georgia	31-12	Italy	Wales (Eleventh); Poland

=== Pool Stage ===
==== Pool A ====
Team	Pld	W	D	L	PF	PA	PD	Pts
England	3	2	0	1	56	38	+18	7
Sweden	3	2	0	1	41	43	–2	7
France	3	1	0	2	28	39	–11	5
Georgia	3	1	0	2	38	43	–5	5

8 September 2018	Georgia	5–7	France
10:00

8 September 2018	England	22–05	Sweden
10:22

8 September 2018	England	17–14	France
12:45

8 September 2018	Georgia	14–19	Sweden
13:07

8 September 2018	England	17–19	Georgia
15:30

8 September 2018	France	7–17	Sweden
15:52

==== Pool B ====
Team	Pld	W	D	L	PF	PA	PD	Pts
Russia	3	3	0	0	67	26	+41	9
Germany	3	1	0	2	48	39	+9	5
Poland	3	1	0	2	27	43	–16	5
Wales	3	1	0	2	33	67	–34	5

8 September 2018	Wales	12–24	Germany
11:28

8 September 2018	Russia	19–5	Poland
11:50

8 September 2018	Russia	15–14	Germany
14:13

8 September 2018	Wales	14–10	Poland
14:35

8 September 2018	Russia	33–7	Wales
16:58

8 September 2018	Germany	10–12	Poland
17:20

==== Pool C ====
Team	Pld	W	D	L	PF	PA	PD	Pts
Ireland	3	3	0	0	71	26	+45	9
Spain	3	2	0	1	46	43	+3	7
Portugal	3	1	0	2	45	57	–12	5
Italy	3	0	0	3	26	62	–36	3

8 September 2018	Portugal	14–15	Spain
10:44

8 September 2018	Ireland	19–7	Italy
11:06

8 September 2018	Ireland	17–7	Spain
13:29

8 September 2018	Portugal	19–7	Italy
13:51

8 September 2018	Ireland	35–12	Portugal
16:14

8 September 2018	Spain	24–12	Italy
16:36

=== Knockout stage ===
==== Challenge Trophy ====
Semi-finals
9 September 2018 – 11:28
Poland	7
Italy	17
9 September 2018 – 11:50
Georgia	28
Wales	5

Final
9 September 2018 – 15:05
Italy	12
Georgia	31
Eleventh Place
9 September 2018 – 14:43
Poland	10
Wales	14

==== 5th Place ====
Semi-finals
9 September 2018 – 13:15
England	24
Spain	26
9 September 2018 – 13:37
Russia	26
Sweden	7

Final
9 September 2018 – 16:24
Spain	17
Russia	26
Seventh Place
9 September 2018 – 16:02
England	29
Sweden	24

==== Cup ====
Quarter-finals
9 September 2018 – 10:00
England	7
Portugal	19
9 September 2018 – 11:06
Germany	14
Spain	7
9 September 2018 – 10:22
Russia	21
France	24
9 September 2018 – 10:44
Ireland	47
Sweden	5

Semi-finals
9 September 2018 – 13:59
Portugal	7
Germany	14
9 September 2018 – 14:21
France	0
Ireland	42

Final
9 September 2018 – 17:11
Germany	5
Ireland	35
Third place
9 September 2018 – 16:46
Portugal	26
France	14
