= 2019 Sudamérica Rugby Sevens Olympic Qualifying Tournament =

- Host nation: Chile
- Date: 29–30 June 2019

Cup
- Champion: Argentina
- Runner-up: Brazil
- Third: Chile

Tournament details
- Matches played: 27

The 2019 Sudamérica Rugby Sevens Olympic Qualifying Tournament for the 2020 Summer Olympics was held on 29–30 June 2019. The winner of the tournament represents Sudamérica Rugby, with the runner-up and third place participant qualified for a 2020 repechage tournament. The highest ranking team not already qualified for the 2019 Pan American Games will also be eligible for that tournament.

== Teams ==
- Argentina
- Brazil
- Chile
- Colombia
- Costa Rica
- Guatemala
- Paraguay
- Peru
- Uruguay
- Venezuela

== Pool stage ==
All times in Chile Standard Time (UTC−04:00)

Legend
Advance to qualifier semifinals
Advance to fifth place match
Advance to seventh place match
Advance to ninth place match

=== Pool A ===
Team	Pld	W	D	L	PF	PA	PD	Pts
Argentina	4	4	0	0	184	5	+179	12
Paraguay	4	3	0	1	74	64	+10	10
Colombia	4	2	0	2	80	26	+54	8
Peru	4	1	0	3	47	130	–83	6
Guatemala	4	0	0	4	29	146	–117	4

29 June 2019
14:30

Colombia	41–0	Peru

Old Grangonian Club, Santiago

29 June 2019
14:52

Argentina	46–0	Guatemala

Old Grangonian Club, Santiago

29 June 2019
16:33

Colombia	10–14	Paraguay

Old Grangonian Club, Santiago

29 June 2019
16:55

Argentina	53–0	Peru

Old Grangonian Club, Santiago

29 June 2019
18:36

Colombia	29–12	Guatemala

Old Grangonian Club, Santiago

29 June 2019
18:58

Argentina	42–5	Paraguay

Old Grangonian Club, Santiago

29 June 2019
20:49

Paraguay	24–7	Peru

Old Grangonian Club, Santiago

30 June 2019
12:00

Paraguay	31–5	Guatemala

Old Grangonian Club, Santiago

30 June 2019
12:22

Argentina	43–0	Colombia

Old Grangonian Club, Santiago

30 June 2019
14:12

Peru	40–12	Guatemala

Old Grangonian Club, Santiago

=== Pool B ===
Team	Pld	W	D	L	PF	PA	PD	Pts
Brazil	4	4	0	0	148	22	+126	12
Chile	4	3	0	1	146	19	+127	10
Uruguay	4	2	0	2	106	61	+45	8
Costa Rica	4	1	0	3	24	180	–156	6
Venezuela	4	0	0	4	26	168	–142	4

29 June 2019
15:14

Uruguay	36–0	Venezuela

Old Grangonian Club, Santiago

29 June 2019
15:36

Chile	51–0	Costa Rica

Old Grangonian Club, Santiago

29 June 2019
17:17

Uruguay	15–19	Brazil

Old Grangonian Club, Santiago

29 June 2019
17:39

Chile	53–0	Venezuela

Old Grangonian Club, Santiago

29 June 2019
19:20

Chile	0–14	Brazil

Old Grangonian Club, Santiago

29 June 2019
19:42

Uruguay	50–0	Costa Rica

Old Grangonian Club, Santiago

29 June 2019
21:11

Brazil	55–7	Venezuela

Old Grangonian Club, Santiago

30 June 2019
12:44

Brazil	60–0	Costa Rica

Old Grangonian Club, Santiago

30 June 2019
13:06

Chile	42–5	Uruguay

Old Grangonian Club, Santiago

30 June 2019
14:34

Venezuela	19–24	Costa Rica

Old Grangonian Club, Santiago

== Placement rounds ==
Ninth place

30 June 2019
16:32

Guatemala	12–24	Venezuela

Old Grangonian Club, Santiago

Seventh place

30 June 2019
16:54

Peru	41–7	Costa Rica

Old Grangonian Club, Santiago

Fifth place

30 June 2019
17:16

Colombia	22–5	Uruguay

Old Grangonian Club, Santiago

== Olympic Qualification ==
Semi-finals
30 June 2019 – 15:48 – Old Grangonian Club
Argentina	35
Chile	0
30 June 2019 – 16:10 – Old Grangonian Club
Brazil	14
Paraguay	12

Final
30 June 2019 – 19:04 – Old Grangonian Club
Argentina	26
Brazil	0
Third place
30 June 2019 – 18:42 – Old Grangonian Club
Chile	43
Paraguay	0

== Standings ==
Legend
Green fill	Qualified for the 2020 Olympics
Blue fill	Qualified for the 2020 Repechage
Blue bar	Qualified for the 2019 Pan American Games

Rank	Team
1st place, gold medalist(s)	Argentina
2nd place, silver medalist(s)	Brazil
3rd place, bronze medalist(s)	Chile
4	Paraguay
5	Colombia
6	Uruguay
7	Peru
8	Costa Rica
9	Venezuela
10	Guatemala

== See also ==
- Rugby sevens at the 2019 Pan American Games
