= 2019 RAN Sevens =

- Host nation: George Town
- Date: 6–7 July

Cup
- Champion: Canada
- Runner-up: Jamaica
- Third: Mexico

The 2019 RAN Sevens was the 20th edition of the annual rugby sevens tournament organized by Rugby Americas North. It was played at the Truman Bodden Sports Complex in George Town, Cayman Islands, with the winner eligible for the 2020 Summer Olympics, and the next two teams qualified for a 2020 repechage tournament. With Canada already a core team in the World Rugby Sevens Series, the top team among the remainder was eligible for the 2020 Hong Kong Sevens qualifying tournament.

== Teams ==
The following eight teams will participate:

- Barbados
- Bermuda
- Canada
- Cayman Islands
- Guyana
- Jamaica
- Mexico
- Trinidad and Tobago

== Pool stage ==
All times in Eastern Standard Time (UTC−05:00)

=== Pool A ===
Team	Pld	W	D	L	PF	PA	PD	Pts
Canada	3	3	0	0	151	5	+146	9
Mexico	3	2	0	1	60	61	–1	6
Bermuda	3	1	0	2	17	101	–84	3
Barbados	3	0	0	3	27	88	–61	0

6 July 2019
11:06

Canada	47–0	Barbados

Truman Bodden Sports Complex, George Town

6 July 2019
11:28

Bermuda	0–31	Mexico

Truman Bodden Sports Complex, George Town

6 July 2019
13:40

Canada	49–5	Mexico

Truman Bodden Sports Complex, George Town

6 July 2019
14:02

Bermuda	17–15	Barbados

Truman Bodden Sports Complex, George Town

6 July 2019
16:36

Canada	55-0	Bermuda

Truman Bodden Sports Complex, George Town

6 July 2019
16:58

Mexico	24-12	Barbados

Truman Bodden Sports Complex, George Town

=== Pool B ===
Team	Pld	W	D	L	PF	PA	PD	Pts
Jamaica	3	3	0	0	111	12	+99	9
Trinidad and Tobago	3	2	0	1	43	39	+4	6
Cayman Islands	3	1	0	2	24	78	–54	3
Guyana	3	0	0	3	26	75	–49	0

6 July 2019
11:50

Jamaica	47–0	Cayman Islands

Truman Bodden Sports Complex, George Town

6 July 2019
12:12

Guyana	7–19	Trinidad and Tobago

Truman Bodden Sports Complex, George Town

6 July 2019
14:24

Jamaica	22–5	Trinidad and Tobago

Truman Bodden Sports Complex, George Town

6 July 2019
14:46

Guyana	12–14	Cayman Islands

Truman Bodden Sports Complex, George Town

6 July 2019
17:20

Jamaica	42-7	Guyana

Truman Bodden Sports Complex, George Town

6 July 2019
17:42

Trinidad and Tobago	19-10	Cayman Islands

Truman Bodden Sports Complex, George Town

== Knockout stage ==
=== Plate ===
Semi-finals
7 July – 12:04 – Truman Bodden Sports Complex
Guyana	17
Trinidad and Tobago	12
7 July – 12:26 – Truman Bodden Sports Complex
Cayman Islands	19
Barbados	12

Final
7 July – 14:38 – Truman Bodden Sports Complex
Guyana	10
Cayman Islands	21
Third place
7 July – 15:00 – Truman Bodden Sports Complex
Trinidad and Tobago	20
Barbados	10

=== Cup ===
Quarter-finals
7 July – 9:30 – Truman Bodden Sports Complex
Canada	47
Guyana	5
7 July – 9:52 – Truman Bodden Sports Complex
Trinidad and Tobago	5
Bermuda	7
7 July – 10:14 – Truman Bodden Sports Complex
Mexico	12
Cayman Islands	7
7 July – 10:36 – Truman Bodden Sports Complex
Jamaica	24
Barbados	10

Semi-finals
7 July – 12:48 – Truman Bodden Sports Complex
Canada	55
Bermuda	0
7 July – 13:10 – Truman Bodden Sports Complex
Mexico	7
Jamaica	24

Final
7 July – 16:30 – Truman Bodden Sports Complex
Canada	40
Jamaica	5
Third place
7 July – 17:14 – Truman Bodden Sports Complex
Bermuda	0
Mexico	50

== Standings ==
Legend
Qualified for the 2020 Olympics
Qualified for the 2020 Repechage

Rank	Team
1st place, gold medalist(s)	Canada
2nd place, silver medalist(s)	Jamaica
3rd place, bronze medalist(s)	Mexico
4	Bermuda
5	Cayman Islands
6	Guyana
7	Trinidad and Tobago
8	Barbados
