= 2019 Asia Rugby Sevens Olympic Qualifying Tournament =

- Hosts: South Korea
- Date: 23–24 November
- Nations: 9

Final positions
- Champions: South Korea
- Runners-up: Hong Kong
- Third: China

The 2019 Asia Rugby Sevens Olympic Qualifying Tournament is a rugby sevens tournament scheduled to be held in Incheon on the 23–24 November 2019. This tournament serves as the 2020 Olympic Rugby Sevens regional qualifier, the winner of the tournament will collect direct qualification to the 2020 Summer Olympics, whilst the runner-up and third-place finisher will advance to the Olympic repechage tournament.

== Main tournament ==
All match times in Korean Standard Time (UTC+9)

=== Teams ===
The teams rankings is based on where they finished in the 2019 Asia Rugby Sevens Series (Note: Japan automatically qualifies as the host nation, therefore, does not take part in the tournament.)

1. Hong Kong
2. China
3. Sri Lanka
4. South Korea
5. Philippines
6. Chinese Taipei
7. Malaysia
8. Singapore
9. Afghanistan

=== Pool stages ===
Teams were placed into each pool following their seeding in the 2019 Asia Rugby Sevens Series.

==== Pool A ====
Team	Pld	W	D	L	PF	PA	PD	Pts
Hong Kong	2	2	0	0	108	0	+108	6
Malaysia	2	1	0	1	26	73	–47	4
Chinese Taipei	2	0	0	2	19	80	–61	2

23 November
10:14

Chinese Taipei	19–26	Malaysia

Incheon Namdong Asiad Rugby Field

23 November
12:44

Hong Kong	54–0	Malaysia

Incheon Namdong Asiad Rugby Field

23 November
15:14

Hong Kong	54–0	Chinese Taipei

Incheon Namdong Asiad Rugby Field

==== Pool B ====
Team	Pld	W	D	L	PF	PA	PD	Pts
China	2	2	0	0	59	27	+32	6
Philippines	2	1	0	1	36	38	–2	4
Singapore	2	0	0	2	24	54	–30	2

23 November
9:52

Philippines	21–12	Singapore

Incheon Namdong Asiad Rugby Field

23 November
12:22

China	33–12	Singapore

Incheon Namdong Asiad Rugby Field

23 November
14:52

China	26–15	Philippines

Incheon Namdong Asiad Rugby Field

==== Pool C ====
Team	Pld	W	D	L	PF	PA	PD	Pts
South Korea	2	2	0	0	63	7	+56	6
Sri Lanka	2	1	0	1	33	49	–16	4
Afghanistan	2	0	0	2	5	45	–40	2

23 November
9:30

South Korea	19–0	Afghanistan

Incheon Namdong Asiad Rugby Field

23 November
12:00

Sri Lanka	26–5	Afghanistan

Incheon Namdong Asiad Rugby Field

23 November
14:30

Sri Lanka	7–44	South Korea

Incheon Namdong Asiad Rugby Field

== Knockout stage ==
Play-Off Final

23 November
17:40

Afghanistan	35–12	Chinese Taipei

Incheon Namdong Asiad Rugby Field

Olympic Qualification (Cup)

Quarter-finals
24 November – 10:00 – Incheon Namdong Asiad Rugby Field
South Korea	32
Malaysia	7
24 November – 10:22 – Incheon Namdong Asiad Rugby Field
China	50
Singapore	5
24 November – 10:44 – Incheon Namdong Asiad Rugby Field
Sri Lanka	17
Philippines	24
24 November – 11:06 – Incheon Namdong Asiad Rugby Field
Hong Kong	38
Afghanistan	0

Semi-finals
24 November – 14:14 – Incheon Namdong Asiad Rugby Field
South Korea	12
China	7
24 November – 14:36 – Incheon Namdong Asiad Rugby Field
Philippines	0
Hong Kong	26

Final
24 November – 17:30 – Incheon Namdong Asiad Rugby Field
South Korea	12
Hong Kong	7
Third place
24 November – 17:04 – Incheon Namdong Asiad Rugby Field
China	19
Philippines	14

Plate

Semi-finals
10 November – 13:30 – Incheon Namdong Asiad Rugby Field
Malaysia	21
Singapore	7
10 November – 13:52 – Incheon Namdong Asiad Rugby Field
Sri Lanka	40
Afghanistan	0

Final
10 November – 16:42 – Incheon Namdong Asiad Rugby Field
Malaysia	7
Sri Lanka	14
Seventh place
10 November – 16:20 – Incheon Namdong Asiad Rugby Field
Singapore	33
Afghanistan	7

== Standings ==
Legend
Qualified to 2020 Summer Olympics
Qualified to Olympic repechage

Rank	Team
1st place, gold medalist(s)	South Korea
2nd place, silver medalist(s)	Hong Kong
3rd place, bronze medalist(s)	China
4	Philippines
5	Sri Lanka
6	Malaysia
7	Singapore
8	Afghanistan
9	Chinese Taipei
