= 2019 Rugby Europe Sevens Trophy =

- Hosts: Croatia; Bosnia and Herzegovina
- Date: 15–23 June
- Nations: 12

Final positions
- Champions: Lithuania
- Runners-up: Ukraine
- Third: Belgium

Series details
- Matches played: 68

The 2019 Rugby Europe Sevens Trophy is the second division of Rugby Europe's 2019 sevens season. This edition was hosted by the cities of Zagreb and Zenica on 15–23 June. The highest-placed teams are promoted to the 2021 Grand Prix, and will join the runner-up to compete in the European Olympic qualifying tournament. The two teams with the fewest points are relegated to the 2021 Conference. The winner was Lithuania.

== Schedule ==
Date	Venue	Winner	Runner-up	Third
15–16 June	(Croatia) Zagreb	Belgium	Ukraine	Lithuania
22–23 June	(Bosnia and Herzegovina) Zenica	Lithuania	Ukraine	Belgium

== Standings ==
Legend
Promoted to 2021 Championship
and Olympic qualifying tournament
Eligible for Olympic qualifying tournament
Relegated to 2021 Conference

Rank	Team	Zagreb	Zenica	Points
1st place, gold medalist(s)	Lithuania	16	20	36 (+219)
2nd place, silver medalist(s)	Ukraine	18	18	36 (+202)
3rd place, bronze medalist(s)	Belgium	20	16	36 (+174)
4	Croatia	14	12	26
5	Czech Republic	4	14	18
6	Sweden	8	8	16
7	Israel	12	4	16
8	Luxembourg	6	10	16
9	Denmark	10	6	16
10	Latvia	2	3	5
11	Bulgaria	3	1	4
12	Bosnia and Herzegovina	1	2	3

== Zagreb ==
All times in Central European Summer Time (UTC+02:00)

Event	Winners	Score	Finalists	Semifinalists
Cup	Belgium	26–7	Ukraine	Lithuania (Third); Croatia
5th Place	Israel	17–5	Denmark	Sweden (Seventh); Luxembourg
9th Place	Czech Republic	26–5	Bulgaria	Latvia (Eleventh); Bosnia and Herzegovina

=== Pool Stage ===
==== Pool A ====
Team	Pld	W	D	L	PF	PA	PD	Pts
Sweden	3	3	0	0	83	5	+78	9
Luxembourg	3	2	0	1	47	43	+4	7
Bosnia and Herzegovina	3	1	0	2	33	59	–26	5
Latvia	3	0	0	3	10	66	–56	3

15 June 2019
11:00

Sweden	35–0	Bosnia and Herzegovina

15 June 2019
11:22

Luxembourg	28–0	Latvia

15 June 2019
13:45

Sweden	19–5	Latvia

15 June 2019
14:07

Luxembourg	19–14	Bosnia and Herzegovina

15 June 2019
16:30

Sweden	29–0	Luxembourg

15 June 2019
16:52

Latvia	5–19	Bosnia and Herzegovina

==== Pool B ====
Team	Pld	W	D	L	PF	PA	PD	Pts
Belgium	3	3	0	0	66	43	+23	9
Israel	3	2	0	1	44	45	–1	7
Ukraine	3	1	0	2	0	0	+30	5
Czech Republic	3	0	0	3	21	73	–52	3

15 June 2019
11:44

Belgium	21–13	Czech Republic

15 June 2019
12:06

Israel	22–14	Ukraine

15 June 2019
14:29

Belgium	21–19	Ukraine

15 June 2019
14:51

Israel	12–7	Czech Republic

15 June 2019
17:14

Belgium	24–10	Israel

15 June 2019
17:36

Ukraine	40–0	Czech Republic

==== Pool C ====
Team	Pld	W	D	L	PF	PA	PD	Pts
Lithuania	3	3	0	0	104	17	+87	9
Denmark	3	1	1	1	45	58	–13	6
Croatia	3	1	1	1	62	41	+21	6
Bulgaria	3	0	0	3	19	114	–95	3

15 June 2019
12:28

Lithuania	43–5	Bulgaria

15 June 2019
12:50

Denmark	12–12	Croatia

15 June 2019
15:13

Denmark	33–7	Bulgaria

15 June 2019
15:35

Lithuania	22–12	Croatia

15 June 2019
17:58

Lithuania	39–0	Denmark

15 June 2019
18:20

Croatia	38–7	Bulgaria

=== Knockout stage ===
==== 9th Place ====
Semi-finals
16 June 2019 – 11:28
Bosnia and Herzegovina	0
Bulgaria	24
16 June 2019 – 11:50
Czech Republic	19
Latvia	0

Ninth place
16 June 2019 – 15:05
Bulgaria	5
Czech Republic	26
Eleventh place
16 June 2019 – 14:43
Bosnia and Herzegovina	5
Latvia	15

==== 5th Place ====
Semi-finals
16 June 2019 – 13:15
Sweden	0
Israel	17
16 June 2019 – 13:37
Denmark	7
Luxembourg	5

Fifth place
16 June 2019 – 16:24
Israel	17
Denmark	5
Seventh place
16 June 2019 – 16:02
Sweden	22
Luxembourg	7

==== Cup ====
Quarter-finals
16 June 2019 – 10:00
Sweden	10
Ukraine	26
16 June 2019 – 11:06
Israel	10
Croatia	14
16 June 2019 – 10:22
Belgium	43
Denmark	0
16 June 2019 – 10:44
Lithuania	33
Luxembourg	12

Semi-finals
16 June 2019 – 13:59
Ukraine	54
Croatia	0
16 June 2019 – 14:21
Belgium	17
Lithuania	14

Final
16 June 2019 – 18:15
Ukraine	7
Belgium	26
Third place
16 June 2019 – 16:46
Croatia	21
Lithuania	31

== Zenica ==
All times in Central European Summer Time (UTC+02:00)

Event	Winners	Score	Finalists	Semifinalists
Cup	Lithuania	24-19	Ukraine	Belgium (Third); Czech Republic
5th place	Croatia	31-0	Luxembourg	Sweden (Seventh); Denmark
9th place	Israel	12-5	Latvia	Bosnia and Herzegovina (Eleventh); Bulgaria

=== Pool Stage ===
==== Pool A ====
Team	Pld	W	D	L	PF	PA	PD	Pts
Belgium	3	3	0	0	81	24	+57	9
Sweden	3	2	0	1	65	47	+18	7
Denmark	3	1	0	2	53	68	–15	5
Bosnia and Herzegovina	3	0	0	3	24	84	–60	3

22 June 2019
12:28

Denmark	12–34	Sweden

22 June 2019
12:50

Belgium	29–7	Bosnia and Herzegovina

22 June 2019
15:13

Belgium	35–7	Sweden

22 June 2019
15:35

Denmark	31–17	Bosnia and Herzegovina

22 June 2019
17:58

Belgium	17–10	Denmark

22 June 2019
18:20

Sweden	24–0	Bosnia and Herzegovina

==== Pool B ====
Team	Pld	W	D	L	PF	PA	PD	Pts
Ukraine	3	3	0	0	91	7	+84	9
Luxembourg	3	1	1	1	32	70	–38	6
Israel	3	1	0	2	38	58	–20	5
Latvia	3	0	1	2	29	55	–26	4

22 June 2019
11:44

Ukraine	19–0	Latvia

22 June 2019
12:06

Israel	12–15	Luxembourg

22 June 2019
14:29

Ukraine	41–0	Luxembourg

22 June 2019
14:51

Israel	19–12	Latvia

22 June 2019
17:14

Ukraine	31–7	Israel

22 June 2019
17:36

Luxembourg	17–17	Latvia

==== Pool C ====
Team	Pld	W	D	L	PF	PA	PD	Pts
Czech Republic	3	3	0	0	91	34	+57	9
Lithuania	3	2	0	1	100	38	+62	7
Croatia	3	1	0	2	58	71	–13	5
Bulgaria	3	0	0	3	10	116	–106	3

22 June 2019
11:00

Lithuania	48–0	Bulgaria

22 June 2019
11:22

Croatia	17–26	Czech Republic

22 June 2019
13:45

Lithuania	17–21	Czech Republic

22 June 2019
14:07

Croatia	24–10	Bulgaria

22 June 2019
16:30

Lithuania	35–17	Croatia

22 June 2019
16:52

Czech Republic	44–0	Bulgaria

=== Knockout stage ===
==== 9th Place ====
Semi-finals
23 June 2019 – 11:28
Israel	43
Bulgaria	0
23 June 2019 – 11:50
Latvia	22
Bosnia and Herzegovina	7

Ninth place
23 June 2019 – 15:19
Israel	12
Latvia	5
Eleventh place
23 June 2019 – 15:41
Bulgaria	17
Bosnia and Herzegovina	19

==== 5th Place ====
Semi-finals
23 June 2019 – 12:45
Denmark	10
Luxembourg	21
23 June 2019 – 13:07
Croatia	14
Sweden	10

Fifth place
23 June 2019 – 15:05
Luxembourg	0
Croatia	31
Seventh place
23 June 2019 – 14:43
Denmark	5
Sweden	31

==== Cup ====
Quarter-finals
23 June 2019 – 10:00
Belgium	38
Denmark	5
23 June 2019 – 11:06
Luxembourg	7
Lithuania	36
23 June 2019 – 10:22
Ukraine	26
Croatia	10
23 June 2019 – 10:44
Czech Republic	26
Sweden	22

Semi-finals
23 June 2019 – 13:29
Belgium	15
Lithuania	21
23 June 2019 – 13:51
Ukraine	31
Czech Republic	5

Final
23 June 2019 – 18:15
Lithuania	24
Ukraine	19
Third place
23 June 2019 – 16:46
Belgium	28
Czech Republic	26
