= Rugby sevens at the 2022 Commonwealth Games – Men's team rosters =

This article shows the rosters of all participating teams at the men's rugby sevens tournament at the 2022 Commonwealth Games in Birmingham.

== Pool A ==
=== New Zealand ===
The following team was announced as the 2022 Commonwealth Games sevens team.

Head coach: Clark Laidlaw

No.	Player	Date of birth (age)
1	Leroy Carter	24 February 1999 (age 23)
2	Che Clark	22 April 2003 (age 19)
3	Dylan Collier (vc)	27 April 1991 (age 31)
4	Scott Curry	17 May 1988 (age 34)
5	Sam Dickson (c)	28 October 1989 (age 32)
6	Moses Leo	11 August 1997 (age 24)
7	Ngarohi McGarvey-Black	20 May 1996 (age 26)
8	Sione Molia	5 September 1993 (age 28)
9	Tone Ng Shiu	26 May 1994 (age 28)
10	Akuila Rokolisoa	27 June 1995 (age 27)
11	Caleb Tangitau	19 March 2003 (age 19)
12	Regan Ware	7 August 1994 (age 27)
13	Joe Webber (vc)	27 August 1993 (age 28)

=== Samoa ===
The following team was announced as the 2022 Commonwealth Games sevens team.

Head coach: Brian Lima

No.	Player	Date of birth (age)
1	Fa'afoi Falaniko	14 March 2002 (aged 20)
2	Iafeta Purcell	11 February 1995 (age 27)
3	Levi Milford	18 September 2001 (aged 20)
4	Melani Matavao	19 November 1995 (age 26)
5	Motu Opetai	20 June 2001 (aged 21)
6	Neueli Leitufia	24 October 2001 (aged 20)
7	Owen Niue	6 April 2000 (aged 22)
8	Paul Scanlan	9 August 1996 (age 25)
9	Steve Onosai	19 September 2001 (aged 20)
10	Taunu'u Niulevaea	
11	Uaina Sione	3 January 1996 (aged 26)
12	Va'afauese Apelu Maliko	10 November 1998 (aged 23)
13	Vaovasa Afa	11 October 1991 (aged 30)

=== England ===
The following team was announced as the 2022 Commonwealth Games sevens team.

Head coach: Tony Roques

No.	Player	Date of birth (age)
1	Jamie Adamson	9 November 1999 (aged 22)
2	Api Bavadra	12 June 2000 (aged 22)
3	Tom Bowen	31 January 1993 (aged 29)
4	Blake Boyland	24 October 2000 (aged 21)
5	Jamie Barden	10 September 1999 (aged 22)
6	Max Clementson	14 July 1998 (aged 24)
7	Alex Davis (c)	3 October 1992 (aged 29)
8	Tom Emery	2 July 1998 (aged 24)
9	Will Homer	24 October 1995 (aged 26)
10	Hayden Hyde	15 September 2000 (aged 21)
11	Charlton Kerr	6 October 1997 (aged 24)
12	Calum Randle	18 January 2000 (aged 22)
13	Freddie Roddick	18 January 1999 (aged 23)

=== Sri Lanka ===
The following team was announced as the 2022 Commonwealth Games sevens team.

Head coach: Nilfer Ibrahaim

No.	Player	Date of birth (age)
1	Dilruksha Dange	7 October 1998 (aged 23)
2	Sudaraka Dikkumbura	27 June 1995 (aged 27)
3	Dansha Chandradas	21 January 1993 (aged 29)
4	Mithun Hapugoda	2 December 1989 (aged 32)
5	Ravindu Hettiarachchi	21 July 1999 (aged 23)
6	Buddhima Kudachchige	28 July 1996 (aged 26)
7	Kavindu Perera	7 December 1993 (aged 28)
8	Reeza Raffaideen	1 September 1996 (aged 25)
9	Nigel Ratwatte	30 April 1990 (aged 32)
10	Ashan Ratwatte	12 December 1995 (aged 26)
11	Chathura Senavirathne	19 September 1998 (aged 23)
12	Srinath Sooriyabandara	17 January 1989 (aged 33)
13	Adeesha Weerathunga	27 July 1997 (aged 25)

== Pool B ==
=== South Africa ===
The following team was announced as the 2022 Commonwealth Games sevens team.

Head coach: Neil Powell

No.	Player	Date of birth (age)
1	Sako Makata	10 September 1998 (age 23)
2	Impi Visser	30 May 1995 (age 27)
3	Zain Davids	4 May 1997 (age 25)
4	Angelo Davids	1 June 1999 (age 23)
5	JC Pretorius	29 January 1998 (age 24)
6	Selvyn Davids	26 March 1994 (age 28)
7	Ronald Brown	2 September 1995 (age 26)
8	Dewald Human	19 May 1995 (age 27)
9	Siviwe Soyizwapi	7 December 1992 (age 29)
10	Muller du Plessis	25 June 1999 (age 23)
11	Mfundo Ndhlovu	5 April 1997 (age 25)
12	Christie Grobbelaar	25 May 2000 (age 22)
13	Shaun Williams	13 April 1998 (age 24)

=== Scotland ===
The following team was announced as the 2022 Commonwealth Games sevens team.

Head coach: Ciaran Beattie

No.	Player	Date of birth (age)
1	Jamie Farndale (c)	21 February 1994 (age 28)
2	Alec Coombes	26 November 1995 (age 26)
3	Ross McCann	30 October 1997 (age 24)
4	Grant Hughes	22 January 1999 (aged 23)
5	Paddy Kelly	18 October 1995 (age 26)
6	Kaleem Barreto	19 December 1998 (age 23)
7	Robbie Fergusson	30 August 1993 (age 28)
8	Matt Davidson	6 November 1999 (aged 22)
9	Harvey Elms	2 June 1995 (age 27)
10	Lee Jones	28 June 1988 (age 34)
11	Jordan Edmunds	28 June 1994 (aged 28)
12	Femi Sofolarin	22 January 2000 (aged 22)
13	Jacob Henry	31 August 2000 (age 21)

=== Tonga ===
The following team was announced as the 2022 Commonwealth Games sevens team.

Head coach:

No.	Player	Date of birth (age)
1	Walter Fifita	6 June 1997 (age 25)
2	Sione Tupou	25 May 1994 (aged 28)
3	Samson Fualalo	21 July 1995 (aged 27)
4	Samisoni Asi	12 October 1989 (aged 32)
5	Rodney Tongotea	18 February 1999 (aged 23)
6	Niukula Osika	31 January 1997 (aged 25)
7	John Tapueluelu	7 April 1996 (aged 26)
8	John Ika	10 April 1992 (aged 30)
9	Edward Sunia	3 October 1990 (aged 31)
10	Atieli Pakalani	2 August 1989 (age 33)
11	Amanaki Veamatahau	22 May 1996 (aged 26)
12	Latuselu Vailea	24 September 1992 (aged 29)
13	Tevita Halafihi	18 April 1995 (aged 27)

=== Malaysia ===
The following team was announced as the 2022 Commonwealth Games sevens team.

Head coach: Saizul Hafifi Noor

No.	Player	Date of birth (age)
1	Ameer Nasrun Zulkefli	24 March 1993 (aged 29)
2	Kamal Hamidi	7 December 1999 (aged 22)
3	Shah Izwan Nordin	14 February 2000 (aged 22)
4	Wan Azley Wan Omar	17 February 1999 (aged 23)
5	Azizul Hakim Che Oon	25 May 1996 (aged 26)
6	Safiy Md Said	2 March 1998 (aged 24)
7	Azwan Zuwairi Mat Zizi	2 August 1997 (aged 24)
8	Eddie Ariff Ferdaus Freedy	
9	Adam Ariff Alias	14 November 2000 (aged 21)
10	Amalul Hazim Nasarrudin	10 January 1995 (aged 27)
11	Daim Zainuddin	11 July 2001 (aged 21)
12	Hafiezie Sudin	17 April 2000 (aged 22)
13	Zulhilmi Azizad	20 April 2001 (aged 21)
14	Suhairi Effendi Mohd Othman (reserve)	6 September 2000 (aged 21)
15	Harith Iqbal (reserve)	

== Pool C ==
=== Fiji ===
The following team was announced as the 2022 Commonwealth Games sevens team.

Head coach: Ben Gollings

No.	Player	Date of birth (age)
1	Elia Canakaivata	12 July 1996 (age 26)
2	Josua Vakurunabili	10 June 1992 (age 30)
3	Tevita Daugunu	12 November 1992 (aged 29)
4	Sevuloni Mocenacagi	29 June 1990 (age 32)
5	Jerry Matana	14 July 1998 (aged 24)
6	Semi Kunatani	27 October 1990 (age 31)
7	Jerry Tuwai	23 March 1989 (age 33)
8	Waisea Nacuqu	24 May 1993 (age 29)
9	Filipe Sauturaga	19 June 1994 (aged 28)
10	Kaminieli Rasaku	12 July 1999 (aged 23)
11	Sireli Maqala	21 March 2000 (age 22)
12	Aminiasi Tuimaba	26 March 1995 (age 27)
13	Vuiviawa Naduvalo	23 May 1996 (aged 26)

=== Canada ===
The following team was announced as the 2022 Commonwealth Games sevens team.

Head coach: Henry Paul

No.	Player	Date of birth (age)
1	Nick Allen	27 April 1996 (aged 26)
2	Phil Berna	7 April 1996 (age 26)
3	Ciaran Breen	19 April 2001 (aged 21)
4	D’Shawn Bowen	9 December 1996 (aged 25)
5	Cooper Coats	6 October 1996 (aged 25)
6	Elias Hancock	11 November 1998 (aged 23)
7	Lachlan Kratz	27 March 2000 (aged 22)
8	Josiah Morra	7 February 1998 (aged 24)
9	Anton Ngongo	22 July 1997 (aged 25)
10	Matthew Oworu	29 July 2000 (aged 22)
11	Alex Russell	22 June 1996 (aged 26)
12	Jake Thiel	2 June 1997 (aged 25)
13	Brock Webster	21 August 2000 (age 21)

=== Wales ===
The following team was announced as the 2022 Commonwealth Games sevens team.

Head coach: Richie Pugh

No.	Player	Date of birth (age)
1	Luke Treharne	18 January 1993 (aged 29)
2	Tyler Morgan	11 September 1995 (age 26)
3	Morgan Sieniawski	11 January 1997 (aged 25)
4	Sam Cross	26 August 1992 (age 29)
5	Tom Brown	12 December 1998 (aged 23)
6	Callum Williams	31 October 2001 (age 20)
7	Owen Jenkins	20 July 1993 (age 29)
8	Tom Williams	2 April 1991 (age 31)
9	Morgan Williams	28 December 1995 (age 26)
10	Cole Swannack	16 October 1998 (aged 23)
11	Lloyd Lewis	5 September 1996 (aged 25)
12	Ewan Rosser	16 December 2000 (age 21)
13	Callum Carson	13 March 1999 (age 23)

=== Zambia ===
The following team was announced as the 2022 Commonwealth Games sevens team.

Head coach: Musonda Kaminsa

No.	Player	Date of birth (age)
1	Israel Kalumba (c)	12 December 1992 (aged 29)
2	Edmond Hamayuwa	14 October 1997 (aged 24)
3	Laston Mukosa	10 September 1992 (aged 29)
4	Davy Chimbukulu	1 June 1994 (aged 28)
5	Lawrence Kaushiku	10 May 1995 (aged 27)
6	Elisha Bwalya	15 July 1999 (aged 23)
7	Mike Masabo	19 January 1995 (aged 27)
8	Brian Mbalwe	8 December 1995 (aged 26)
9	Rodgers Mukupa	7 May 1993 (aged 29)
10	Alex Mwewa	25 November 1998 (aged 23)
11	Chisanga Nkoma	1 April 1995 (aged 27)
12	Michello Sheleni	3 July 1988 (aged 34)
13	Melvin Banda	26 August 1998 (aged 23)

== Pool D ==
=== Australia ===
The following team was announced as the 2022 Commonwealth Games sevens team.

Head coach: John Manenti

No.	Player	Date of birth (age)
1	Ben Dowling	5 March 2000 (aged 22)
2	Matthew Gonzalez	1 June 1994 (aged 28)
3	Henry Hutchison	12 February 1997 (age 25)
4	Samu Kerevi	27 September 1993 (age 28)
5	Nathan Lawson	23 January 1999 (age 23)
6	Maurice Longbottom	30 January 1995 (age 27)
7	Nick Malouf	19 March 1993 (age 29)
8	Benn Marr	4 August 1997 (aged 24)
9	Mark Nawaqanitawase	11 September 2000 (age 21)
10	Henry Paterson	26 February 1997 (aged 25)
11	Dietrich Roache	6 July 2001 (age 21)
12	Corey Toole	7 March 2000 (age 22)
13	Josh Turner	23 September 1995 (age 26)

=== Kenya ===
The following team was announced as the 2022 Commonwealth Games sevens team.

Head coach: Damian McGrath

No.	Player	Date of birth (age)
1	Nelson Oyoo (c)	26 June 1994 (age 28)
2	Herman Humwa	8 November 1995 (age 26)
3	Alvin Otieno	19 April 1994 (age 28)
4	Vincent Onyala	10 December 1996 (age 25)
5	Bush Mwale	7 November 1993 (age 28)
6	Kevin Wekesa	7 August 2000 (aged 21)
7	Anthony Omondi	26 March 1995 (aged 27)
8	Johnstone Olindi	4 November 1999 (age 22)
9	Billy Odhiambo	7 November 1993 (age 28)
10	Edmund Anya	15 June 1998 (aged 24)
11	Daniel Taabu	19 January 1996 (age 26)
12	Levy Amunga	10 March 1994 (aged 28)
13	Willy Ambaka	14 May 1990 (age 32)

=== Uganda ===
The following team was announced as the 2022 Commonwealth Games sevens team.

Head coach: Tolbert Onyango

No.	Player	Date of birth (age)
1	Ian Munyani	27 October 1997 (aged 24)
2	Adrian Kasito	30 October 1995 (aged 26)
3	William Nkore	7 May 1997 (aged 25)
4	Philip Wokorach	31 December 1993 (aged 28)
5	Timothy Kisiga	2 December 1996 (aged 25)
6	Michael Wokorach	14 August 1990 (aged 31)
7	Desire Ayera	9 January 1999 (aged 23)
8	Aaron Ofoyrowth	7 October 1997 (aged 24)
9	Isaac Massanganzira	9 December 1996 (aged 25)
10	Norbert Okeny	30 October 1998 (aged 23)
11	Ivan Otema	17 May 1999 (aged 23)
12	Karim Arinaitwe	23 July 1999 (aged 23)
13	Alex Aturinda	26 November 1997 (aged 24)

=== Jamaica ===
The following team was announced as the 2022 Commonwealth Games sevens team.

Head coach:

No.	Player	Date of birth (age)
1	Tyler Bush	13 May 1996 (aged 26)
2	Ronaldeni Fraser	10 August 2002 (aged 19)
3	Rhodri Adamson	29 October 1993 (aged 28)
4	Oshane Edie	5 January 1991 (aged 31)
5	Michael St. Claire	2 August 1989 (aged 32)
6	Mason Caton-Brown	24 May 1993 (age 29)
7	Lucas Roy-Smith	10 November 1989 (aged 32)
8	Gareth Stoppani	11 April 1990 (aged 32)
9	Fabion Turner	5 October 1991 (aged 30)
10	Dy'neal Fessal	3 July 1992 (aged 30)
11	Conan Osborne	19 March 1993 (aged 29)
12	Ashley Smith	18 June 1991 (aged 31)
13	Omar Dixon	9 December 1990 (aged 31)
