= 2022 France Sevens =

Rugby sevens tournament

- Sevens World Series XXIII
- Host nation: France
- Date: 20–22 May 2022

Cup
- Champion: Fiji
- Runner-up: Ireland
- Third: France

Tournament details
- Matches played: 45
- Tries scored: 117 (average 2.6 per match)
- Most points: Marcos Moneta (8 tries)
- Most tries: Marcos Moneta (40 points)

The 2022 France Sevens was the thirteenth edition of the annual Sevens tournament held in France. It was the first time since 2019 (2 years, 352 days; suspended due to the impact of COVID-19) that the tournament was held in France, and the first time that the event was held in the southern city of Toulouse, Haute-Garonne at the Stade Ernest-Wallon.

The tournament winners were Fiji, who won their fourth France Sevens event, and their second back-to-back tournaments. Fiji won the final against first-time Sevens Series finalists Ireland 29–17.

Following the event, Argentina, Ireland, Fiji and hosts France jumped up one place on the series ladder, while Samoa, who finished fourth, jumped from fifteenth to tenth. Teams Canada and Kenya dropped two places, and the United States, finishing with their second-worst result of the series, dropped three places to sit seventh overall.

== Format ==
The sixteen teams were drawn into four pools of four. Each team played the three opponents in their pool once. The top two teams from each pool advanced to the Cup bracket, with the losers of the quarter-finals vying for a fifth-place finish. The remaining eight teams that finished third or fourth in their pool played off for 9th place, with the losers of the 9th-place quarter-finals competing for 13th place.

== Teams ==
The sixteen national teams competing in France were:

- Argentina
- Australia
- Canada
- England
- Fiji
- France
- Ireland
- Japan
- Kenya
- New Zealand
- Samoa
- Scotland
- South Africa
- Spain
- United States
- Wales

== Pool stage ==
=== Pool A ===
Team	Pld	W	D	L	PF	PA	PD	Pts	Qualification
Argentina	3	2	0	1	74	31	+43	7	Cup quarter-finals
England	3	2	0	1	52	34	+18	7	Cup quarter-finals
Canada	3	2	0	1	64	50	+14	7	
Japan	3	0	0	3	29	104	−75	3	

20 May
CET (UTC+1)

England	24–5	Canada
Try: Alex Davis 1' m Tom Bowen 8' c Api Bavadra 13' c Tom Emery 15' m Con: Freddie Roddick (2) 8', 14'	Report	Try: Alex Russell 3' m Cards: David Richard (yellow card)

Stade Ernest-Wallon
Referee: Finlay Brown (Scotland)

20 May
CET (UTC+1)

Argentina	43–5	Japan
Try: Felipe del Mestre 1' m Luciano González (2) 5' c, 8' m Marcos Moneta (3) 9' c, 10' m, 14' c Joaquin Lamas 12' c Con: Tobias Wade (2) 6', 10'; Joaquin Lamas (2) 13', 14'	Report	Try: Taiga Ishida 4' m

Stade Ernest-Wallon
Referee: Nika Amashukeli (Georgia)

20 May
CET (UTC+1)

England	21–10	Japan
Try: Api Bavadra 3' c Jamie Barden 5' c Freddie Roddick 9' c Con: Freddie Roddick (2) 3', 6'; Tom Emery 10'	Report	Try: Yuki Ishii (2) 12' m, 14' m

Stade Ernest-Wallon
Referee: Craig Chan (Hong Kong)

20 May
CET (UTC+1)

Argentina	12–19	Canada
Try: Matías Osadczuk 3' c Tobias Wade 12' m Con: Tobias Wade 4'	Report	Try: Anton Ngongo 2' m Jake Thiel 6' c David Richard 14' c Con: Cooper Coats 7'; Brock Webster 15'

Stade Ernest-Wallon
Referee: Ben Breakspear (Wales)

21 May
CET (UTC+1)

Canada	40–14	Japan
Try: Brock Webster 4' c Phil Berna 9' c Elias Ergas (2) 10' c, 11' c Brennig Prevost 12' m Thomas Isherwood 15' c Con: Cooper Coats (5) 4', 9', 11', 12', 15'	Report	Try: Timo Fiti Sufia 5' c Kameli Raravou Latianara Soejima 7' c Con: Ryota Kano (2) 6', 8'

Stade Ernest-Wallon
Referee: Jeremy Rozier (France)

21 May
CET (UTC+1)

Argentina	19–7	England
Try: Marcos Moneta 3' m Matías Osadczuk (2) 8' c, 10' c Con: Tobias Wade (2) 9', 11'; Cards: Rodrigo Isgro (yellow card)	Report	Try: Will Homer 14' c Con: Tom Emery 15'; Cards: Will Homer (yellow card)

Stade Ernest-Wallon
Referee: Finlay Brown (Scotland)

=== Pool B ===
Team	Pld	W	D	L	PF	PA	PD	Pts	Qualification
Fiji	3	3	0	0	81	26	+55	9	Cup quarter-finals
France	3	2	0	1	115	52	+63	7	Cup quarter-finals
Kenya	3	1	0	2	38	81	−43	5	
Wales	3	0	0	3	19	94	−75	3	

20 May
CET (UTC+1)

France	56–5	Wales
Try: Paulin Riva (2) 1' c, 8' c Thibaud Mazzoleni 3' c Joachim Trouabal (2) 5' c, 13' c Jonathan Laugel 7' c Joris Simon 10' c Aaron Grandidier 11' c Con: Paulin Riva (4) 2', 3', 6', 7'; Thibaud Mazzoleni 9'; Marius Domon (2) 10', 12'; William Iraguha 14'	Report	Try: Callum Williams 4' m Cards: Tyler Morgan (yellow card)

Stade Ernest-Wallon
Referee: Gianluca Gnecchi (Italy)

20 May
CET (UTC+1)

Fiji	29–5	Kenya
Try: Kaminieli Rasaku (2) 2' c, 8' m Waisea Nacuqu 3' m Elia Canakaivata 7' m Filipe Sauturaga 15' c Con: Kaminieli Rasaku 2'; Napolioni Bolaca 15'	Report	Try: Alvin Otieno 8' m Cards: Herman Humwa (yellow card)

Stade Ernest-Wallon
Referee: Ben Breakspear (Wales)

20 May
CET (UTC+1)

France	38–14	Kenya
Try: Joachim Trouabal (3) 2' m, 3' c, 10' m Aaron Grandidier 9' c Jordan Sepho (2) 14' c, 16' c Con: Paulin Riva (2) 4', 9'; Marius Domon (2) 15', 17'	Report	Try: Nelson Oyoo 5' c Alvin Otieno 10' c Con: Anthony Omondi (2) 5', 11'

Stade Ernest-Wallon
Referee: AJ Jacobs (South Africa)

20 May
CET (UTC+1)

Fiji	19–0	Wales
Try: Sevuloni Mocenacagi 2' m Napolioni Bolaca 4' c Con: Semi Kunatani 5'	Report	Cards: Luke Treharne (yellow card); Iwan Pyrs Jones (yellow card)

Stade Ernest-Wallon
Referee: Nika Amashukeli (Georgia)

21 May
CET (UTC+1)

Wales	14–19	Kenya
Try: Ewan Rosser 6' c Morgan Williams 13' c Con: Tom Williams 7'; Luke Treharne 14'	Report	Try: Herman Humwa (2) 3' c, 7' c Billy Odhiambo 10'; Con: Anthony Omondi (2) 4', 7'; Cards: Timothy Mmasi (yellow card)

Stade Ernest-Wallon
Referee: Craig Chan (Hong Kong)

21 May
CET (UTC+1)

Fiji	33–21	France
Try: Kaminieli Rasaku 3'; Sevuloni Mocenacagi 4' c Pilipo Bukayaro 7' c Waisea Nacuqu 8' c Filipe Sauturaga 13' c Con: Waisea Nacuqu (3) 5', 8', 8'; Napolioni Bolaca 14'	Report	Try: Pierre Mignot 6' c Jonathan Laugel 10' c Nisie Huyard 15' c Con: Paulin Riva 6'; Thibaud Mazzoleni (2) 11', 15'

Stade Ernest-Wallon
Referee: Adam Leal (England)

=== Pool C ===
Team	Pld	W	D	L	PF	PA	PD	Pts	Qualification
Australia	3	2	0	1	76	45	+31	7	Cup quarter-finals
United States	3	2	0	1	69	50	+19	7	Cup quarter-finals
New Zealand	3	2	0	1	52	46	+6	7	
Scotland	3	0	0	3	19	75	−56	3	

20 May
CET (UTC+1)

New Zealand	19–0	Scotland
Try: Caleb Tangitau 11' c Ngarohi McGarvey-Black 13' m Amanaki Nicole 14' c Con: Ngarohi McGarvey-Black 12'; Akuila Rokolisoa 15'; Cards: Leroy Carter (yellow card)	Report	Cards: Kaleem Barreto (yellow card)

Stade Ernest-Wallon
Referee: AJ Jacobs (South Africa)

20 May
CET (UTC+1)

Australia	19–24	United States
Try: Matt Gonzalez 1' c Corey Toole 9' c Josh Turner 13' m Con: Dietrich Roache (2) 2', 10'; Cards: Corey Toole (yellow card)	Report	Try: Perry Baker (3) 3' c, 10' m, 11' c Lucas Lacamp 6' m Con: Steve Tomasin (2) 3', 12'

Stade Ernest-Wallon
Referee: Adam Leal (England)

20 May
CET (UTC+1)

New Zealand	19–17	United States
Try: Joe Webber (2) 1', 3'; Akuila Rokolisoa 11'; Con: Ngarohi McGarvey-Black 1'; Akuila Rokolisoa 12'	Report	Try: Lucas Lacamp 6'; Kevon Williams 9'; Dmontae Noble 13'; Con: Steve Tomasin 13'

Stade Ernest-Wallon
Referee: Gianluca Gnecchi (Italy)

20 May
CET (UTC+1)

Australia	28–7	Scotland
Try: Henry Hutchison 7' c Maurice Longbottom 8' c Josh Turner 10' c Max Burey 16' c Con: Henry Hutchison (2) 8', 9'; Dietrich Roache (2) 11', 16'	Report	Try: Femi Sofolarin 14' c Con: Harvey Elms 14'

Stade Ernest-Wallon
Referee: Jeremy Rozier (France)

21 May
CET (UTC+1)

Scotland	12–28	United States
Try: Jordan Edmunds 4' m Paddy Kelly 11' c Con: Robbie Fergusson 11'	Report	Try: Kevon Williams (2) 2' c, 7' c Lucas Lacamp 9' c Joe Schroeder 12' c Con: Steve Tomasin (4) 3', 7', 9', 13'

Stade Ernest-Wallon
Referee: Nika Amashukeli (Georgia)

20 May
CET (UTC+1)

Australia	29–14	New Zealand
Try: Henry Hutchison (2) 1' m, 11' m Ben Dowling 4' m Corey Toole 8' m Dietrich Roache 10' c Con: Dietrich Roache (2) 9', 11'	Report	Try: Leroy Carter 7' c Amanaki Nicole 13' c Con: Ngarohi McGarvey-Black 8'; Regan Ware 13'

Stade Ernest-Wallon
Referee: Ben Breakspear (Wales)

=== Pool D ===
Team	Pld	W	D	L	PF	PA	PD	Pts	Qualification
Samoa	3	3	0	0	88	33	+55	9	Cup quarter-finals
Ireland	3	2	0	1	61	60	+1	7	Cup quarter-finals
South Africa	3	1	0	2	46	47	−1	5	
Spain	3	0	0	3	40	95	−55	3	

20 May
CET (UTC+1)

South Africa	12–21	Ireland
Try: Mfundo Ndhlovu 2' c Siviwe Soyizwapi 10' m Con: Ronald Brown 2'; Cards: Zain Davids (yellow card)	Report	Try: Terry Kennedy (2) 7' c, 12' c Jack Kelly 8' c Con: Billy Dardis (3) 7', 8', 13'

Stade Ernest-Wallon
Referee: Jeremy Rozier (France)

20 May
CET (UTC+1)

Samoa	42–12	Spain
Try: Vaa Apelu Maliko (2) 3' c, 12' c Steve Onosai (2) 5' c, 10' c Iafeta Purcell 8' c Ati Junior Ati 14' c Con: Melani Matavao (5) 4', 5', 8', 10', 13'; Faafoi Falaniko 14'	Report	Try: Eduardo López 6' m Tiago Romero 12' c Con: Juan Martínez 12'

Stade Ernest-Wallon
Referee: Craig Chan (Hong Kong)

20 May
CET (UTC+1)

South Africa	27–7	Spain
Try: Zain Davids (2) 1' m, 8' m Siviwe Soyizwapi 10' m Ronald Brown 12' c Dalvon Blood 15' m Con: Ronald Brown 13'	Report	Try: Enrique Bolinches 3' c Con: Juan Ramos 3'

Stade Ernest-Wallon
Referee: Finlay Brown (Scotland)

20 May
CET (UTC+1)

Samoa	27–14	Ireland
Try: Steve Onosai (2) 3' m, 9' m Paul Scanlan (2) 11' c, 12' c Con: Melani Matavao (2) 11', 12'; Pen: Melani Matavao 14'	Report	Try: Jordan Conroy 6' c Jack Kelly 8' c Con: Billy Dardis (2) 6', 9'; Cards: Terry Kennedy (yellow card)

Stade Ernest-Wallon
Referee: Adam Leal (England)

21 May
CET (UTC+1)

Ireland	26–21	Spain
Try: Jordan Conroy 4' c Terry Kennedy 6' m Zac Ward 11' c Andrew Smith 13' c Con: Sean Kearns (2) 5', 11'; Billy Dardis 13'	Report	Try: Tobias Sainz-Trapaga (2) 3' c, 7' c Francisco Soriano 15' c Con: Juan Martínez 3'; Juan Ramos (2) 8', 15'

Stade Ernest-Wallon
Referee: AJ Jacobs (South Africa)

21 May
CET (UTC+1)

Samoa	19–7	South Africa
Try: Vaa Apelu Maliko (2) 3' c, 4' m Steve Onosai 7' c Con: Melani Matavao (2) 4', 7'	Report	Try: Ronald Brown 12' c Con: Ronald Brown 12'

Stade Ernest-Wallon
Referee: Gianluca Gnecchi (Italy)

== Knockout stage ==
=== 13th–16th playoffs ===
13th place Semi-finals
22 May – Stade Ernest-Wallon
Canada	7
Wales	27
22 May – Stade Ernest-Wallon
Kenya	12
Japan	28

13th place Final
22 May – Stade Ernest-Wallon
Wales	14
Japan	28

Matches

Semi-finals

22 May
CET (UTC+1)

Canada	7–27	Wales
	Report

Stade Ernest-Wallon

22 May
CET (UTC+1)

Kenya	12–28	Japan
	Report

Stade Ernest-Wallon

13th place Final

22 May
CET (UTC+1)

Wales	14–28	Japan
	Report

Stade Ernest-Wallon

=== 9th–12th playoffs ===
Quarter-finals
21 May – Stade Ernest-Wallon
Canada	19
Spain	21
21 May – Stade Ernest-Wallon
New Zealand	28
Wales	0
21 May – Stade Ernest-Wallon
Kenya	14
Scotland	26
21 May – Stade Ernest-Wallon
South Africa	40
Japan	0

Semi-finals
22 May – Stade Ernest-Wallon
Spain	7
New Zealand	36
22 May – Stade Ernest-Wallon
Scotland	24
South Africa	21

9th Place Final
22 May – Stade Ernest-Wallon
New Zealand	42
Scotland	7

Matches

Quarter-finals

21 May
CET (UTC+1)

Canada	19–21	Spain
	Report

Stade Ernest-Wallon

21 May
CET (UTC+1)

New Zealand	28–0	Wales
	Report

Stade Ernest-Wallon

21 May
CET (UTC+1)

Kenya	14–26	Scotland
	Report

Stade Ernest-Wallon

21 May
CET (UTC+1)

South Africa	40–0	Japan
	Report

Stade Ernest-Wallon

Semi-finals

22 May
CET (UTC+1)

Spain	7–36	New Zealand
	Report

Stade Ernest-Wallon

22 May
CET (UTC+1)

Scotland	24–21	South Africa
	Report

Stade Ernest-Wallon

9th place Final

22 May
CET (UTC+1)

New Zealand	42–7	Scotland
	Report

Stade Ernest-Wallon

=== 5th–8th playoffs ===
5th place Semi-finals
22 May – Stade Ernest-Wallon
Australia	7
Argentina	22
22 May – Stade Ernest-Wallon
United States	14
England	29

5th place Final
22 May – Stade Ernest-Wallon
Argentina	21
England	12

Matches

Semi-finals

22 May
CET (UTC+1)

Australia	7–22	Argentina
	Report

Stade Ernest-Wallon

22 May
CET (UTC+1)

United States	14–29	England
	Report

Stade Ernest-Wallon

5th place Final

22 May
CET (UTC+1)

Argentina	21–12	England
	Report

Stade Ernest-Wallon

=== Cup playoffs ===
Cup quarterfinals
21 May – Stade Ernest-Wallon
Australia	19
France	21
21 May – Stade Ernest-Wallon
Ireland	14
Argentina	0
21 May – Stade Ernest-Wallon
Fiji	19
United States	17
21 May – Stade Ernest-Wallon
Samoa	26
England	24

Cup semifinals
22 May – Stade Ernest-Wallon
France	7
Ireland	24
22 May – Stade Ernest-Wallon
Fiji	28
Samoa	7

Cup final
22 May – Stade Ernest-Wallon
Ireland	17
Fiji	29
Bronze final
22 May – Stade Ernest-Wallon
France	17
Samoa	12

Matches

Quarter-finals

21 May
CET (UTC+1)

Australia	19–21	France
	Report

Stade Ernest-Wallon

21 May
CET (UTC+1)

Ireland	14–0	Argentina
	Report

Stade Ernest-Wallon

21 May
CET (UTC+1)

Fiji	19–17	United States
	Report

Stade Ernest-Wallon

21 May
CET (UTC+1)

Samoa	26–24	England
	Report

Stade Ernest-Wallon

Semi-finals

22 May
CET (UTC+1)

France	7–24	Ireland
	Report

Stade Ernest-Wallon

22 May
CET (UTC+1)

Samoa	28–7	Fiji
	Report

Stade Ernest-Wallon

Third place

22 May
CET (UTC+1)

France	17–12	Samoa
	Report

Stade Ernest-Wallon

Cup Final

22 May
CET (UTC+1)

Ireland	17–29	Fiji
	Report

Stade Ernest-Wallon

=== Placings ===
Place	Team	Points
1st place, gold medalist(s)	Fiji	22
2nd place, silver medalist(s)	Ireland	19
3rd place, bronze medalist(s)	France	17
4	Samoa	15
5	Argentina	13
6	England	12
7	Australia	10
7	United States	10

Place	Team	Points
9	New Zealand	8
10	Scotland	7
11	South Africa	5
11	Spain	5
13	Japan	3
14	Wales	2
15	Canada	1
15	Kenya	1

== See also ==
- 2022 France Sevens (for women)

Sevens Series XXIII
Preceded by 2022 Canada Sevens	2022 France Sevens	Succeeded by 2022 London Sevens
France Sevens
Preceded by 2019 France Sevens	2022 France Sevens	Succeeded by 2023 France Sevens
