= Rugby sevens at the 2022 Commonwealth Games – Men's tournament =

2022 Men's Commonwealth Rugby Sevens Tournament
Tournament details
- Host: England
- Venue: Coventry Stadium, Coventry
- Date: 29–31 July 2022

Final positions
- Champions: South Africa (2nd title)
- Runner-up: Fiji
- Third place: New Zealand
- Fourth place: Australia

The rugby sevens at the 2022 Commonwealth Games – Men's tournament was the men's event of the Commonwealth Games rugby sevens competition held every four years. It was held at the Coventry Stadium from 29 to 31 July 2022.

== Venue ==
The rugby sevens tournaments were originally scheduled to take place at Villa Park, but instead took place at the Coventry Stadium in Coventry.

The adjacent Coventry Arena was used for judo and wrestling.

== Qualification ==
England qualified as host nation, nine nations qualified via the World Rugby Sevens Series, and six nations booked their places in regional qualification tournaments.

Means of qualification	Date	Location	Quotas	Qualified
Host Nation	—	—	1	England
2018–19 & 2019–20; World Rugby Sevens Series	30 November 2018 – 2 June 2019; 5 December 2019 – 8 March 2020	Various	9	New Zealand; Fiji; South Africa; Australia; Samoa; Canada; Scotland; Kenya; Wales
2019 Oceania Sevens (Note: A men's qualification tournament scheduled for April 2022 was abandoned owing to COVID-19-related logistical challenges, so the (pre-pandemic) 2019 championship was designated as the Oceania qualifier.)	7–9 November 2019	(Fiji) Suva	1	Tonga
2021 Asia Sevens	19–20 November 2021	(United Arab Emirates) Dubai	2	Sri Lanka; Malaysia
2022 RAN Sevens Qualifiers	23–24 April 2022	(The Bahamas) Nassau	1	Jamaica
2022 Africa Men's Sevens	23–24 April 2022	(Uganda) Kampala	2	Uganda; Zambia
Total			16	

== Competition format ==
On 8 July 2022, the pools' formation was announced. The top two teams in each pool will advance to the medal round knockout stage, and the remaining teams will compete for a ninth to sixteenth place.

== Officials ==
A total of 8 Referees, 3 Assistants and 3 Television Match Officials (TMOs) were selected for the tournament.

Referee	Assistants	Television Match Officials
Ben Breakspear (Wales)	James Clarke (England)	Craig Joubert (South Africa)
Finlay Brown (Scotland)	George Selwood (England)	Steve Leyshon (England)
Talal-Azmat Chaudhry (Canada)	Harry Walbaum (England)	Paddy O'Brien (New Zealand)
Morne Ferreira (South Africa)
Nick Hogan (New Zealand)
Adam Leal (England)
Tevita Rokovereni (Fiji)
Jordan Way (Australia)

== Pool stage ==
=== Pool A ===
Pos	Team	Pld	W	D	L	PF	PA	PD	Pts	Qualification
1	New Zealand	3	3	0	0	102	22	+80	9	Advance to Quarter-finals
2	Samoa	3	2	0	1	99	19	+80	7	Advance to Quarter-finals
3	England	3	1	0	2	47	77	−30	5	Advance to classification Quarter-finals
4	Sri Lanka	3	0	0	3	24	154	−130	3	Advance to classification Quarter-finals

Source: Birmingham2022
Rules for classification: 1) Points; 2) Head-to-head result; 3) Point difference; 4) Points scored.

29 July 2022
11:12

New Zealand	63–5	Sri Lanka
Try: Curry 1' c McGarvey-Black (2) 2' c, 8' c Molia (2) 4' c, 13' c Webber 5' c Collier 9' c Rokolisoa 10' c Tangitau 14' c Con: McGarvey-Black (5/5) 1', 2', 4', 6', 8'; Rokolisoa (4/4) 10', 11', 13', 14'	Report	Try: Ratwatte 6' m

Coventry Stadium, Coventry
Referee: Ben Breakspear (Wales)

29 July 2022
11:34

England	0–38	Samoa
	Report	Try: Onosai (3) 2' c, 6' m, 7' m Maliko 5' c Falaniko 12' m Con: Matavao (2/5) 3', 5'; Purcell (0/1); Cards: Leitufia (yellow card) 11'

Coventry Stadium, Coventry
Referee: Jordan Way (Australia)

29 July 2022
19:42

England	47–19	Sri Lanka
Try: Kerr (2) 1' m, 6' c Adamson (2) 4' c, 14' c Bowen 6' c Homer 8' c Emery 13' c Con: Roddick (5/6) 5', 6', 7', 9', 14'; Emery (1/1) 13'; Cards: Adamson (yellow card) 7'; Roddick (yellow card) 11'	Report	Try: Sooriyabandara 7' c A. Ratwatte 8' c Kudachchige 10' m Con: Sooriyabandara (1/2) 7'; N. Ratwatte (1/1) 8'

Coventry Stadium, Coventry
Referee: Finlay Brown (Scotland)

29 July 2022
20:04

New Zealand	19–17	Samoa
Try: Dickson 7' c Webber 9' m Tangitau 12' c Con: McGarvey-Black (2/3) 7', 13'	Report	Try: Scanlan 1' c Niue 3' m Maliko 5' m Con: Matavao (1/3) 1'

Coventry Stadium, Coventry
Referee: Adam Leal (England)

30 July 2022
11:12

Samoa	44–0	Sri Lanka
Try: Scanlan (4) 1' m, 4' m, 5' m, 6' m Opetai 7' c Sione 8' c Niue 10' m Onosai 14' m Con: Purcell (1/5) 9'; Leitufia (1/3) 7'	Report

Coventry Stadium, Coventry
Referee: Talal-Azmat Chaudhry (Canada)

30 July 2022
11:34

New Zealand	20–0	England
Try: Webber 6' m Tangitau 8' m Clark (2) 11' m, 14' m Con: Rokolisoa (0/2); McGarvey-Black (0/2)	Report

Coventry Stadium, Coventry
Referee: Morné Ferreira (South Africa)

=== Pool B ===
Pos	Team	Pld	W	D	L	PF	PA	PD	Pts	Qualification
1	South Africa	3	3	0	0	116	5	+111	9	Advance to Quarter-finals
2	Scotland	3	2	0	1	91	46	+45	7	Advance to Quarter-finals
3	Tonga	3	1	0	2	36	84	−48	5	Advance to classification Quarter-finals
4	Malaysia	3	0	0	3	19	127	−108	3	Advance to classification Quarter-finals

Source: Birmingham2022
Rules for classification: 1) Points; 2) Head-to-head result; 3) Point difference; 4) Points scored.

29 July 2022
11:56

South Africa	46–0	Malaysia
Try: A. Davids (3) 1' m, 6' m, 11' m du Plessis 5' c S. Davids 7' m Soyizwapi 8' c Human 10' m S. Davids 14' c Con: Brown (2/6) 5', 9'; Williams (0/1); Human (1/1) 14'	Report

Coventry Stadium, Coventry
Referee: Tevita Rokovereni (Fiji)

29 July 2022
12:18

Scotland	41–0	Tonga
Try: Sofolarin (3) 1' c, 4' m, 7' m Henry 8' c Edmunds 9' m Farndale 12' m Coombes 14' c Con: Barreto (2/4) 1', 9'; Elms (0/2); Barreto (1/1) 14'; Cards: Elms (yellow card) 13'	Report

Coventry Stadium, Coventry
Referee: Adam Leal (England)

29 July 2022
20:26

Scotland	50–12	Malaysia
Try: Davidson 1' c Jones (2) 2' c, 5' c Coombes 6' m Henry (3) 8' m, 9 m, 10' c Sofolarin 13' c Con: Davidson (5/8) 1', 2', 5', 10', 14'	Report	Try: Mat Zizi 3' c Nasarrudin 7' m Con: Mat Zizi (1/2) 4'

Coventry Stadium, Coventry
Referee: Talal-Azmat Chaudhry (Canada)

29 July 2022
20:48

South Africa	36–5	Tonga
Try: Soyizwapi 1' m Grobbelaar (2) 3' c, 5' m Pretorius 8' m Makata 9' c Human 14' c Con: Brown (2/5) 4', 9'; Human (1/1) 14'	Report	Try: Asi 7' m Con: Asi (0/1); Cards: Ika (red card) 13'

Coventry Stadium, Coventry
Referee: Jordan Way (Australia)

30 July 2022
11:56

Tonga	31–7	Malaysia
Try: Asi 1' c Pakalani (2) 3' c, 4 m Vailea 9' c Halafihi 14' m Con: Pakalani (2/3) 1', 3'; Asi (1/2) 10'	Report	Try: Nasarrudin 13' c Con: Said (1/1) 13'

Coventry Stadium, Coventry
Referee: Ben Breakspear (Wales)

30 July 2022
12:18

South Africa	34–0	Scotland
Try: S. Davids 4' m Pretorius 6' m A. Davids (3) 8' c, 10' m, 12' m Williams 14' c Con: Brown (0/2); S. Davids (1/1) 9'; Williams (0/1); Human (1/2) 14'	Report

Coventry Stadium, Coventry
Referee: Nick Hogan (New Zealand)

=== Pool C ===
Pos	Team	Pld	W	D	L	PF	PA	PD	Pts	Qualification
1	Fiji	3	3	0	0	109	36	+73	9	Advance to Quarter-finals
2	Canada	3	2	0	1	67	31	+36	7	Advance to Quarter-finals
3	Wales	3	1	0	2	62	74	−12	5	Advance to classification Quarter-finals
4	Zambia	3	0	0	3	17	114	−97	3	Advance to classification Quarter-finals

Source: Birmingham2022
Rules for classification: 1) Points; 2) Head-to-head result; 3) Point difference; 4) Points scored.

29 July 2022
12:40

Canada	31–0	Wales
Try: Russell (2) 3' m, 8' c Coats 5' m Thiel 7' c Oworu 13' c Con: Coats (3/5) 7', 8', 13'; Cards: Morra (yellow card) 13'	Report	Cards: T. Williams (yellow card) 11'

Coventry Stadium, Coventry
Referee: Finlay Brown (Scotland)

29 July 2022
13:02

Fiji	52–0	Zambia
Try: Mocenacagi 2' c Nacuqu 3' c Mocenacagi 5' m Canakaivata 7' c Tuimaba 8' c Naduvalo (2) 11' m, 14' c Kunatani 13' c Con: Nacuqu (4/4) 2', 4', 7', 8'; Rasaku (0/1); Sauturaga (2/3) 13', 14'	Report

Coventry Stadium, Coventry
Referee: Morné Ferreira (South Africa)

29 July 2022
21:10

Wales	38–5	Zambia
Try: C. Williams 1' c Swannack 2' c Sieniawski 5' c Treharne 11' m Carson 13' c Smith 14' m Con: Treharne (3/3) 1', 3', 6'; T. Williams (1/3) 13'; Cards: C. Williams (yellow card) 9'	Report	Try: Kaushiku 9' m Con: Mwewa (0/1); Cards: Mukosa (yellow card) 11'; Banda (yellow card) 13'

Coventry Stadium, Coventry
Referee: Nick Hogan (New Zealand)

29 July 2022
21:32

Fiji	19–12	Canada
Try: Mocenacagi 1' c Josua Vakurunabili 3' m Mocenacagi 4' c Con: Nacuqu (2/3) 1', 5'; Cards: Naduvalo (yellow card) 12'	Report	Try: Webster 7' m Penalty try 12'; Con: Coats (0/1)

Coventry Stadium, Coventry
Referee: Ben Breakspear (Wales)

30 July 2022
12:40

Canada	24–12	Zambia
Try: Morra 3' m Morra 7' c Bowen 8' c Allen 12' m Con: Coats (2/3) 7', 9'; Webster (0/1)	Report	Try: Banda 2' m Kaushiku 5' c Con: Mukosa (0/1); Mwewa (1/1) 5'; Cards: Bwalya (yellow card) 7' Banda (yellow card) 8'

Coventry Stadium, Coventry
Referee: Tevita Rokovereni (Fiji

30 July 2022
13:02

Fiji	38–24	Wales
Try: Sauturaga (2) 1' c, 8' m Naduvalo (2) 3' c, 5' m Nacuqu 6' c Rasaku 12' c Con: Sauturaga (1/1) 1'; Nacuqu (2/4) 3', 7'; Rasaku (1/1) 13'	Report	Try: T. Williams 2' c Lewis (2) 10' c, 11' c M. Williams 14' m Con: T. Williams (3/3) 2', 10', 12'; Jenkins (0/1)

Coventry Stadium, Coventry
Referee: Adam Leal (England)

=== Pool D ===
Pos	Team	Pld	W	D	L	PF	PA	PD	Pts	Qualification
1	Australia	3	2	1	0	81	17	+64	8	Advance to Quarter-finals
2	Kenya	3	2	0	1	77	21	+56	7	Advance to Quarter-finals
3	Uganda	3	1	1	1	66	39	+27	6	Advance to classification Quarter-finals
4	Jamaica	3	0	0	3	0	147	−147	3	Advance to classification Quarter-finals

Updated to match(es) played on 29 July 2022. Source: Birmingham2022
Rules for classification: 1) Points; 2) Head-to-head result; 3) Point difference; 4) Points scored.

29 July 2022
10:28

Australia	62–0	Jamaica
Try: Kerevi (3) 1' m, 5' c, 6' c Lawson (2) 2' c, 12' c Toole 4' c Roache 9' m Malouf 10' c Longbottom 11' m Nawaqanitawase 14' m Con: Dowling (4/5) 2', 4', 6', 7'; Roache (2/5) 10', 12'	Report

Coventry Stadium, Coventry
Referee: Nick Hogan (New Zealand)

29 July 2022
10:50

Kenya	27–14	Uganda
Try: Olindi (2) 1' m, 12' m Humwa 2' c Odhiambo 4' m Wekesa 14' m Con: Olindi (1/3) 3'; Taabu (0/2)	Report	Try: Kisiga 5' c Wokorach 9' c Con: Wokorach (2/2) 5', 10'

Coventry Stadium, Coventry
Referee: Talal-Azmat Chaudhry (Canada)

29 July 2022
18:58

Kenya	45–0	Jamaica
Try: Oyoo 1' m Onyala 2' c Taabu 6' c Ambaka 7' m Wekesa 9' c Mwale 11' c Otieno 14' c Con: Taabu (2/4) 3', 6'; Olindi (1/1) 9'; Amunga (2/2) 11', 14'	Report

Coventry Stadium, Coventry
Referee: Tevita Rokovereni (Fiji)

29 July 2022
19:20

Australia	12–12	Uganda
Try: Malouf 4' m Hutchison 9' c Con: Longbottom (0/1); Roache (1/1) 10'; Cards: Longbottom (yellow card) 11'; Roache (yellow card) 12'	Report	Try: Ayera 7' c Wokorach 12' m Con: Wokorach (1/2) 7'; Cards: Wokorach (0/1)

Coventry Stadium, Coventry
Referee: Morné Ferreira (South Africa)

30 July 2022
10:28

Uganda	40–0	Jamaica
Try: Kasito 1' c Munyani 4' c Ofoyrowth (2) 6' m, 9' c Wokorach 8' c Nkore 12' c Con: Wokorach (5/6) 1', 5', 8', 9', 13'	Report

Coventry Stadium, Coventry
Referee: Jordan Way (Australia)

30 July 2022
10:50

Australia	7–5	Kenya
Try: Toole 10' c Con: Roache (1/1) 11'; Cards: Nawaqanitawase (yellow card) 1'; Lawson (yellow card) 8'	Report	Try: Otieno 2' m Cards: Mwale (yellow card) 4'

Coventry Stadium, Coventry
Referee: Finlay Brown (Scotland)

== Knockout stage ==
=== Medal place matches ===
Quarter-finals
30 July – Coventry Stadium
New Zealand	31
Kenya	0
30 July – Coventry Stadium
Fiji	34
Scotland	7
30 July – Coventry Stadium
Australia	7
Samoa	0
30 July – Coventry Stadium
South Africa	33
Canada	0

Semi-finals
31 July – Coventry Stadium
New Zealand	14
Fiji (a.e.t.)	19
31 July – Coventry Stadium
Australia	12
South Africa	24

Gold medal match
31 July – Coventry Stadium
Fiji	7
South Africa	31
Bronze medal match
31 July – Coventry Stadium
New Zealand	26
Australia	12

==== Quarter–finals ====
30 July 2022
20:26

Fiji	34–7	Scotland
Try: Nacuqu (2) 2' m, 8' c Rasaku 5' c Mocenacagi 7' m Matana 10' m Maqala 12' m Con: Nacuqu (1/3) 8'; Rasaku (1/2) 5'; Sauturaga (0/1)	Report	Try: Edmunds 14' c Con: Davidson (1/1) 14'

Coventry Stadium, Coventry
Referee: Ben Breakspear (Wales)

30 July 2022
20:48

South Africa	33–0	Canada
Try: Brown (2) 1' c, 9' m Grobbelaar 5' c A. Davids 7' c Ndhlovu 12' c Con: Brown (2/2) 1', 6'; S. Davids (1/2) 7'; Human (1/1) 12'; Cards: Brown (yellow card) 7'	Report

Coventry Stadium, Coventry
Referee: Finlay Brown (Scotland)

30 July 2022
21:10

New Zealand	31–0	Kenya
Try: McGarvey-Black 3' c Ware (2) 7' m, 8' c Curry 10' m Collier 12' c Con: McGarvey-Black (3/5) 4', 9', 13'	Report

Coventry Stadium, Coventry
Referee: Morné Ferreira (South Africa)

30 July 2022
21:32

Australia	7–0	Samoa
Try: Gonzalez 8' c Con: Roache (1/1) 8'; Cards: Malouf (yellow card) 10'	Report

Coventry Stadium, Coventry
Referee: Nick Hogan (New Zealand)

==== Semi–finals ====
31 July 2022
12:42

New Zealand	14–19 (a.e.t.)	Fiji
Try: Ware 5' c Con: McGarvey-Black (1/1) 6'; Cards: Rokolisoa (yellow card) 14'; Carter (yellow card) 14'	Report	Try: Sauturaga 7' c Mocenacagi 10' c Nacuqu 15'; Con: Nacuqu (2/2) 7', 10'; Cards: Rasaku (yellow card) 3'

Coventry Stadium, Coventry
Referee: Jordan Way (Australia)

31 July 2022
13:04

Australia	12–24	South Africa
Try: Nawaqanitawase 1' m Gonzalez 6' c Con: Roache (1/2) 6'; Cards: Hutchison (yellow card) 7'	Report	Try: A. Davids (3) 4' c, 7' m, 12' m S. Davids 8' c Con: Brown (1/1) 4'; A. Davids (0/1); S. Davids (1/1) 8'; Williams (0/1)

Coventry Stadium, Coventry
Referee: Adam Leal (England)

==== Bronze medal match ====
31 July 2022
20:12

New Zealand	26-12	Australia
Try: Carter (2) 0' c, 11' m Leo (2) 6' c, 9' c Con: McGarvey-Black (3/4) 1', 6', 9'	Report	Try: Turner 4' c Paterson 13' m Con: Roache (1/2) 4'

Coventry Stadium, Coventry
Referee: Ben Breakspear (Wales)

==== Gold medal match ====
31 July 2022
21:04

Fiji	7–31	South Africa
Try: Nacuqu 10' c Con: Nacuqu (1/1) 11'	Report	Try: du Plessis (2) 2' c, 8' c Pretorius 4' m Williams 6' m, Ndhlovu 13' c Con: Williams (2/3) 2', 8'; S. Davids (0/1); Human (1/1) 14'

Coventry Stadium, Coventry
Referee: Adam Leal (England)

=== 5th–8th placed matches ===
5th–8th place semi-finals
31 July – Coventry Stadium
Kenya	12
Scotland	22
31 July – Coventry Stadium
Samoa	19
Canada	17

Fifth place match
31 July – Coventry Stadium
Scotland	19
Samoa	24

==== 5–8 Semi-finals ====
31 July 2022
11:58

Kenya	12–22	Scotland
Try: Oyoo 8' m Taabu 11' c Con: Omondi (1/2) 12'	Report	Try: Edmunds 4' m Barreto 7' m Elms 13' c McCann 14' m Con: Barreto (1/4) 13'

Coventry Stadium, Coventry
Referee: Nick Hogan (New Zealand)

31 July 2022
12:20

Samoa	19–17	Canada
Try: Onosai (2) 6' c, 11' c Sione 9' m Con: Matavao (2/3) 6', 11'; Cards: Afa (yellow card) 8'	Report	Try: Thiel (2) 1' c, 3' m Coats 14' m Con: Coats (1/3) 1'

Coventry Stadium, Coventry
Referee: Morné Ferreira (South Africa)

==== 5th Place playoff ====
31 July 2022
19:28

Scotland	19–24	Samoa
Try: Fergusson 6' m Sofolarin 8' c, 9' c Con: Barreto (2/3) 8', 9'	Report	Try: Niue 1' c Onosai 7' m Leitufia 11' c, 12' m Con: Matavao (1/1) 1'; Purcell (1/3) 11'

Coventry Stadium, Coventry
Referee: Morné Ferreira (South Africa)

=== Classification bracket ===
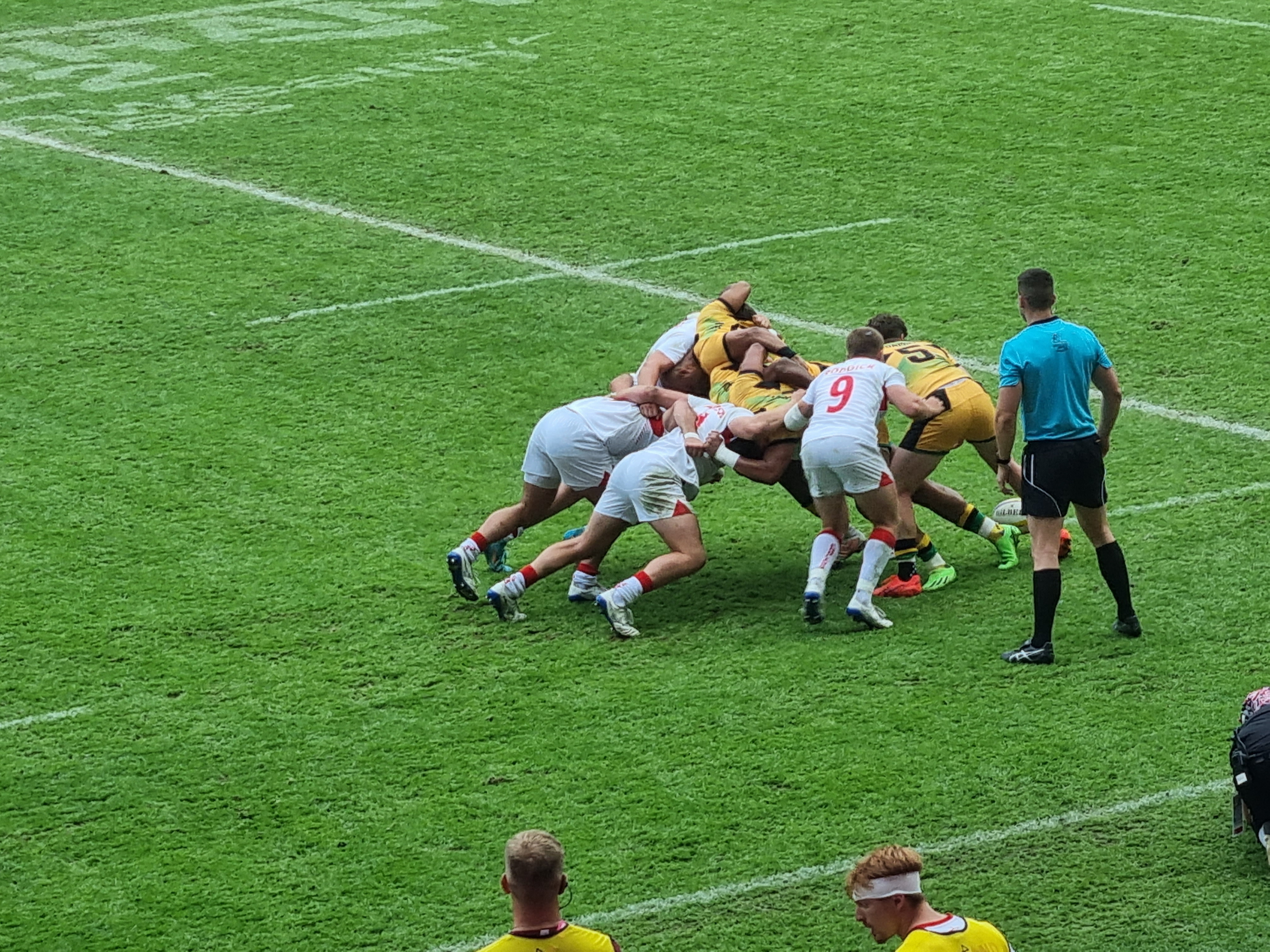
England vs Jamaica

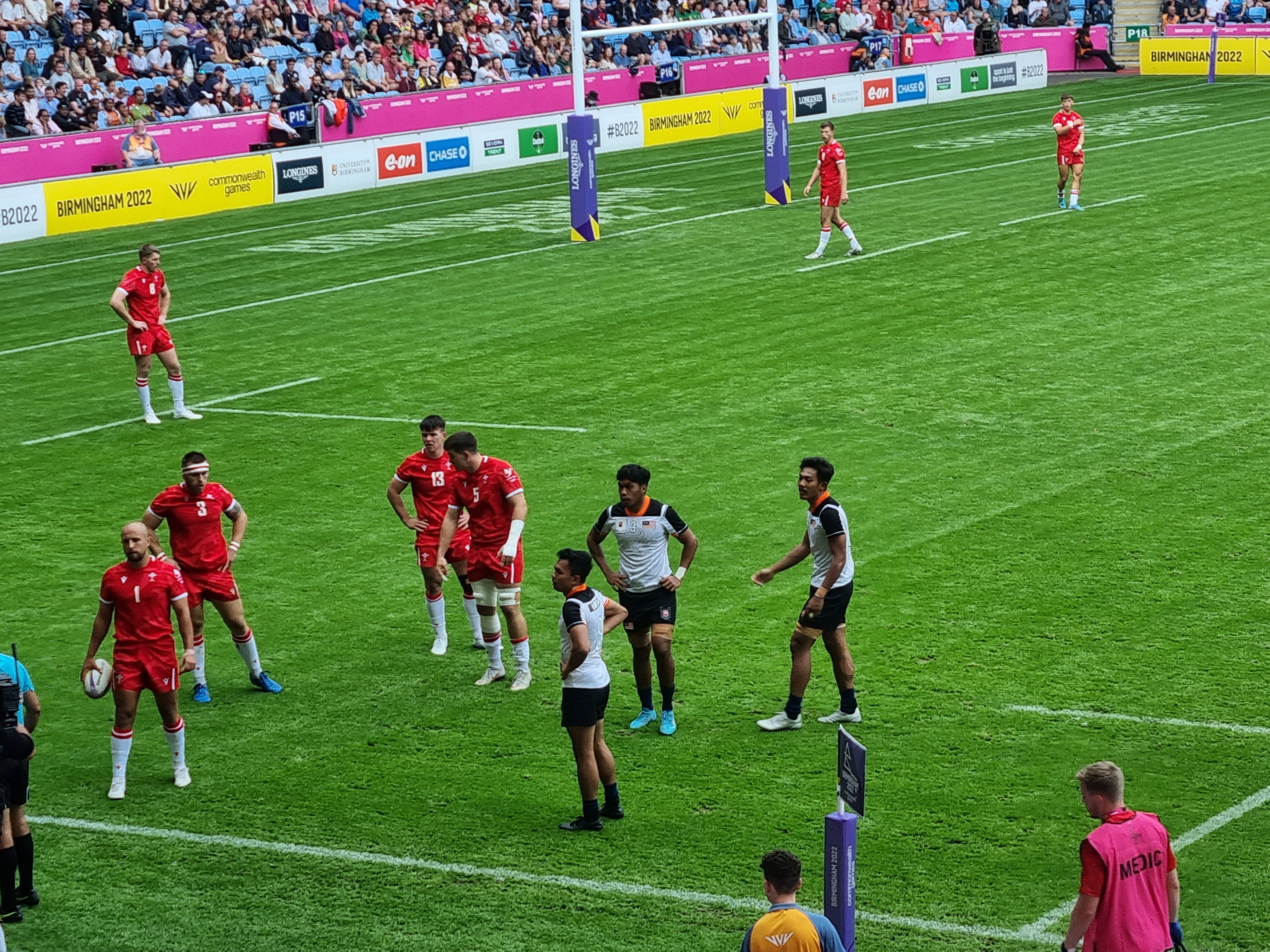
Wales vs Malaysia

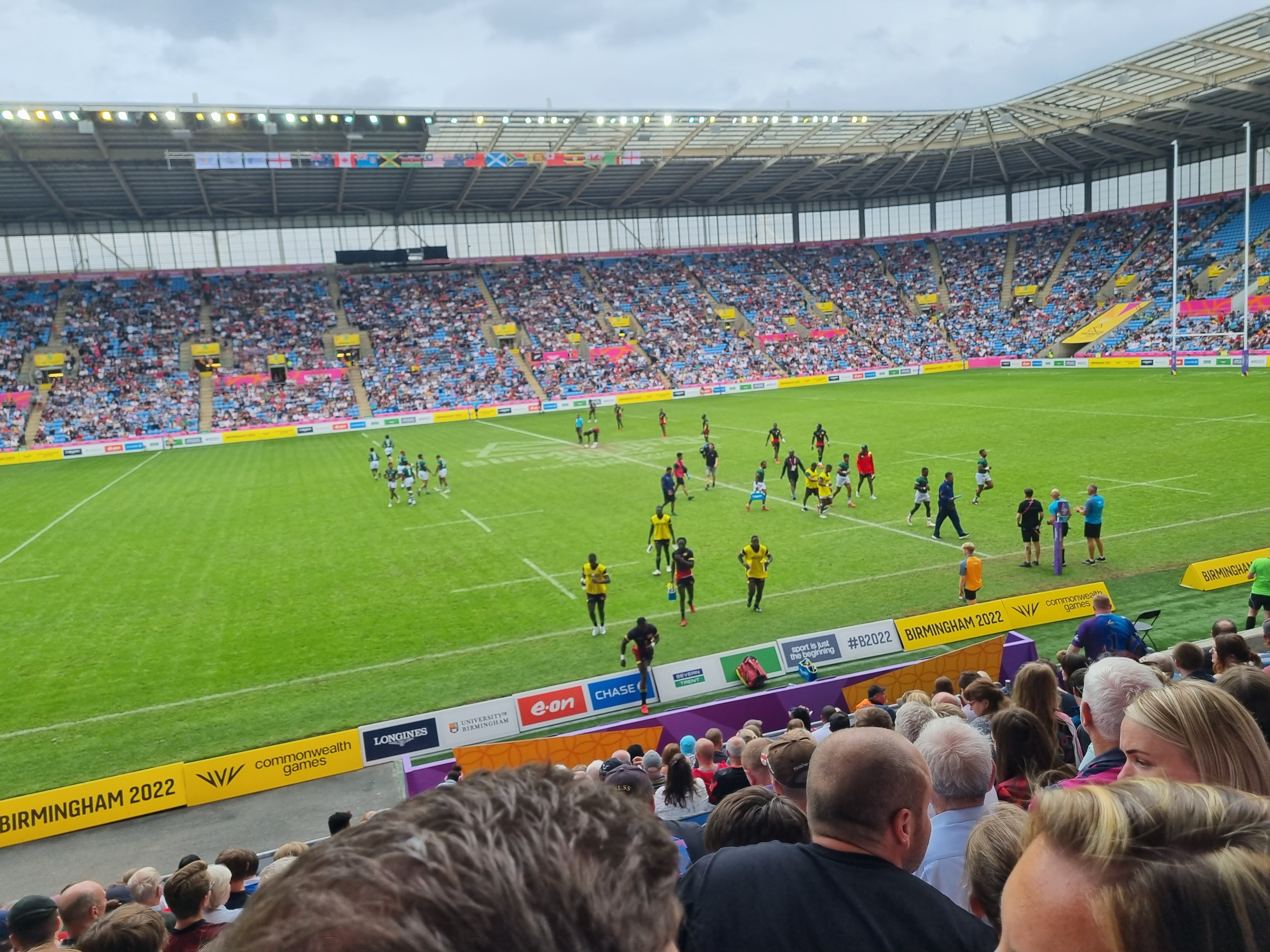
Uganda vs Sri Lanka

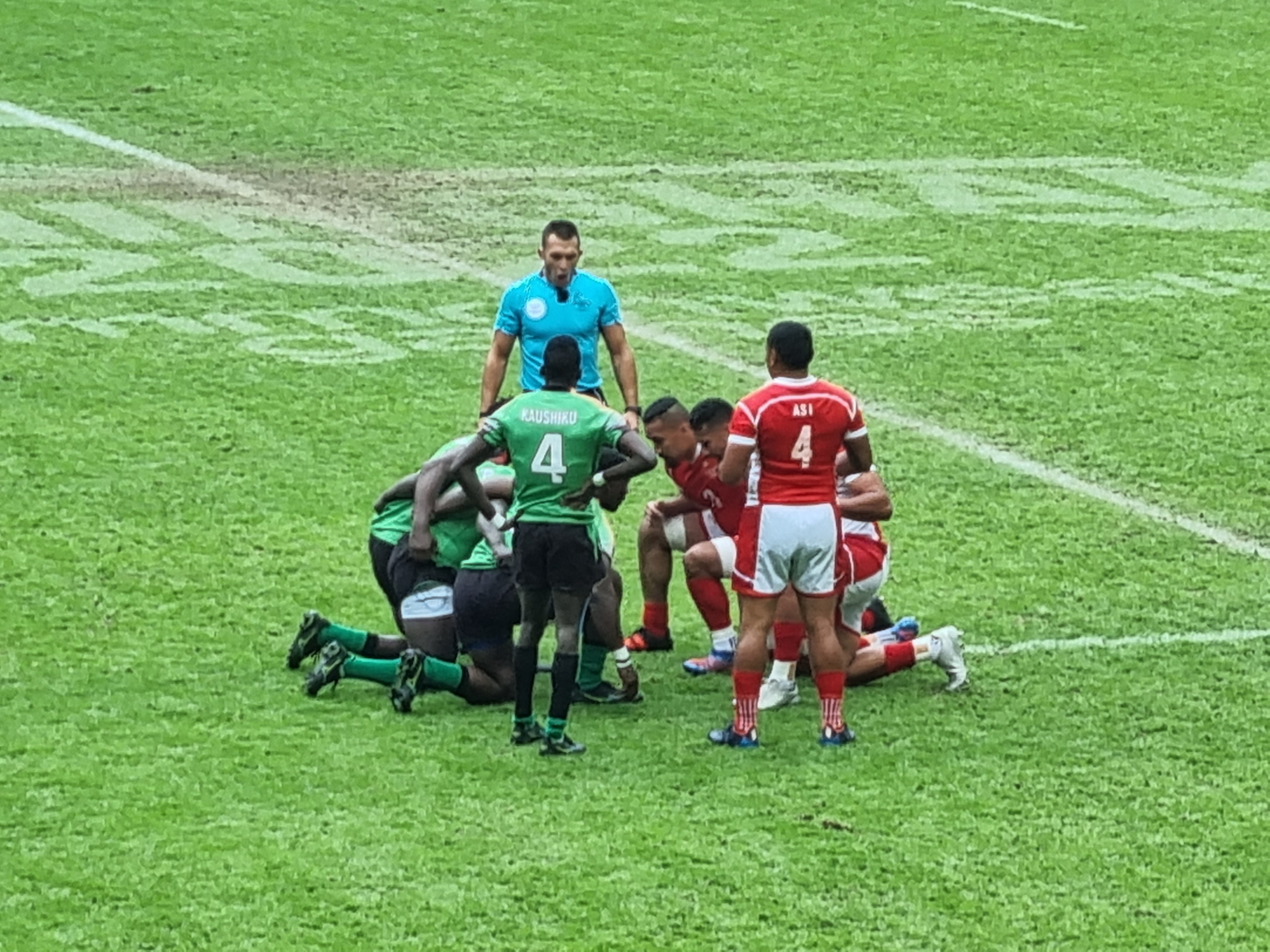
Tonga vs Zambia

9th–12th place Quarter-finals
30 July – Coventry Stadium
England	45
Jamaica	7
30 July – Coventry Stadium
Wales	33
Malaysia	14
30 July – Coventry Stadium
Uganda	38
Sri Lanka	19
30 July – Coventry Stadium
Tonga	19
Zambia	7

9th–12th place Semi-finals
31 July – Coventry Stadium
England	14
Wales	10
31 July – Coventry Stadium
Uganda	27
Tonga	7

Ninth place match
31 July – Coventry Stadium
England	31
Uganda	7

==== 9–16 Quarter-finals ====
30 July 2022
18:14

England	45–7	Jamaica
Try: Bowen (2) 1' m, 4' m Emery 6' c Roddick 7' c Hyde 8' c Bavadra 10' c Homer 12' c Con: Emery (4/6) 6', 7', 8', 11'; Homer (1/1) 12'	Report	Try: Bush 8' c Con: Adamson (1/1) 10'

Coventry Stadium, Coventry
Referee: Jordan Way (Australia)

30 July 2022
18:36

Wales	33–14	Malaysia
Try: C. Williams (3) 4' m, 8' c, 9' c Lewis 13' c Carson 14' c Con: T. Williams (3/4) 8', 9', 13'; Swannack (1/1) 14'	Report	Try: Sudin 2' c Nordin 7' c Con: Mat Zizi (2/2) 2', 7'

Coventry Stadium, Coventry
Referee: Talal-Azmat Chaudhry (Canada)

30 July 2022
18:58

Uganda	38–19	Sri Lanka
Try: Wokorach 3' c Ofoyrowth 4' c Munyani 7' m Okorach (3) 9' m, 10' c, 11' c Con: Wokorach (4/6) 3', 4', 10', 12'; Cards: Munyani (yellow card) 3'	Report	Try: Kudachchige 1' c Sooriyabandara 5' c Raffaideen 14' m Con: Sooriyabandara (2/3) 2', 6'

Coventry Stadium, Coventry
Referee: Tevita Rokovereni (Fiji)

30 July 2022
19:20

Tonga	19–7	Zambia
Try: Tongotea 6' c Fualalo 8' m Sunia 8' c Con: Pakalani (2/3) 7', 9'	Report	Try: Mukosa 11' c Con: Mbalwe (1/1) 12'; Cards: Bwalya (yellow card) 6'; Nkoma (yellow card) 14'

Coventry Stadium, Coventry
Referee: Adam Leal (England)

==== 9–12 Semi-finals ====
31 July 2022
11:14

England	14–10	Wales
Try: Homer 1' c Bavadra 4' c Con: Roddick (2/2) 1', 4'	Report	Try: Williams (2) 12' m, 14' m Con: Swannack (0/2); Cards: Morgan (yellow card) 8'

Coventry Stadium, Coventry
Referee: Talal-Azmat Chaudhry (Canada)

31 July 2022
11:36

Uganda	27–7	Tonga
Try: Okorach 1' m Kasito 7' m Wokorach (2) 8' m, 11' m Ofoyrwoth 14' c Con: Wokorach (0/4); Kisiga (1/1) 14'	Report	Try: Osika 4' c Con: Pakalani (1/1) 4'; Cards: Halafihi (yellow card) 10'

Coventry Stadium, Coventry
Referee: Tevita Rokovereni (Fiji)

==== 9th Place playoff ====
31 July 2022
18:44

England	31–17	Uganda
Try: Adamson (3) 3' c, 8' c, 9' m Emery 8' c Bowen 11' m Con: Roddick (1/1) 3'; Emery (2/4) 8', 8'	Report	Try: Ofoyrwoth 5' m Kisiga 12' c Arinaitwe 14' m Con: Wokorach (1/3) 12'

Coventry Stadium, Coventry
Referee: Tevita Rokovereni (Fiji)

==== 13th–16th placed matches ====
13th–16th place Semi-finals
31 July – Coventry Stadium
Jamaica	28
Malaysia	7
31 July – Coventry Stadium
Sri Lanka	27
Zambia	14

Thirteenth place match
31 July – Coventry Stadium
Jamaica	26
Sri Lanka	24

===== 13th–16th Semi-finals =====
31 July 2022
10:30

Jamaica	28–7	Malaysia
Try: Bush 4' c Turner 9' c Caton-Brown (2) 9' c, 13' c Con: Stoppani (2/2) 4', 9'; Adamson (1/1) 10'; Roy-Smith (1/1) 13' c Cards: Adamson (red card) 11'	Report	Try: Nasarrudin 8' c Con: Mat Zizi (1/1) 8'

Coventry Stadium, Coventry
Referee: Finlay Brown (Scotland)

31 July 2022
10:52

Sri Lanka	27–14	Zambia
Try: N. Ratwatte (2) 3' m, 8' m Chandradas 7' m Kudachchige 10' m A. Ratwatte 13' c Con: N. Ratwatte (0/1); A. Ratwatte (0/1); Hapugoda (1/3) 13'	Report	Try: Mwewa 5' c Chimbukulu 12' c Con: Mukosa (1/1) 5'; Mbalwe (1/1) 12'; Cards: Bwalya (yellow card) 7'

Coventry Stadium, Coventry
Referee: Ben Breakspear (Wales)

===== 13th Place playoff =====
31 July 2022
18:44

Jamaica	26–24	Sri Lanka
Try: Caton-Brown (2) 1' c, 8' c Smith 6' m Edie 10' c Con: Roy-Smith (3/4) 1', 8', 11'	Report	Try: N. Ratwatte 3' c Hettiarachchi 7' m Kudachchige 9' c Hapugoda 14' c Con: Hapugoda (1/2) 4'; N. Ratwatte (2/2) 9', 14'

Coventry Stadium, Coventry
Referee: Finlay Brown (Scotland)

== Final standing ==
Rank	Team
1st place, gold medalist(s)	South Africa
2nd place, silver medalist(s)	Fiji
3rd place, bronze medalist(s)	New Zealand
4	Australia
5	Samoa
6	Scotland
7	Canada
7	Kenya
9	England
10	Uganda
11	Tonga
11	Wales
13	Jamaica
14	Sri Lanka
15	Malaysia
15	Zambia

== Player statistics ==
=== Most points ===
Pos	Name	Team	Pts
1	Philip Wokorach	Uganda	56
2	Waisea Nacuqu	Fiji	54
3	Angelo Davids	South Africa	50
4	Ngarohi McGarvey-Black	New Zealand	43
5	Steve Onosai	Samoa	35
6	Sevuloni Mocenacagi	Fiji	30
6	Femi Sofolarin	Scotland	30
8	Tom Emery	England	29
9	Jamie Adamson	England	25
9	Aaron Ofoyrwoth	Uganda	25
9	Paulo Scanlan	Uganda	25

=== Most tries ===
Pos	Name	Team	Tries
1	Angelo Davids	South Africa	10
2	Steve Onosai	Samoa	7
3	Sevuloni Mocenacagi	Fiji	6
3	Waisea Nacuqu	Fiji	6
3	Femi Sofolarin	Scotland	6
3	Philip Wokorach	Uganda	6
7	Jamie Adamson	England	5
7	Aaron Ofoyrwoth	Uganda	5
7	Paulo Scanlan	Samoa	5
10	Tom Bowen	England	4
10	Mason Caton-Brown	Jamaica	4
10	Jacob Henry	Scotland	4
10	Buddhima Kudachchige	Sri Lanka	4
10	Micheal Okorach	Uganda	4
10	Callum Williams	Wales	4

== See also ==
- Rugby sevens at the 2022 Commonwealth Games – Women's tournament
