= 2022 Rugby World Cup Sevens – Men's tournament =

2022 Rugby World Cup Sevens
Tournament details
- Host nation: 2022 Rugby World Cup Sevens
- Dates: 9 – 11 September 2022
- No. of nations: 24

Final positions
- Champions: Fiji
- Runner-up: New Zealand
- Third place: Ireland

Tournament statistics
- Matches played: 52
- Tries scored: 276 (average 5.31 per match)
- Top scorer(s): Brock Webster (35)
- Most tries: Steve Onosai (7)
- Points scored: 1,726 (average 33.19 per match)

The men's tournament for the 2022 Rugby World Cup Sevens was held in Cape Town, South Africa from 9 to 11 September at the Cape Town Stadium.

== Teams ==
The eight quarter-finalists from the 2018 Rugby World Cup Sevens, including the 2022 tournament host South Africa, were automatic qualifiers. The remaining 16 places were decided in the six continental regions.

Region	Automatic qualifiers	Continental qualifiers	Teams
Africa (Note: Africa: The top three teams from the 2022 Africa Men's Sevens joined host nation South Africa at the 2022 Rugby World Cup Sevens.)	South Africa (hosts)	Uganda; Zimbabwe; Kenya	4
North America (Note: North America: The top two teams from the 2022 RAN Sevens Qualifiers joined automatic qualifier United States at the 2022 Rugby World Cup Sevens.)	United States	Canada; Jamaica	3
South America (Note: South America: The top two teams from the 2021 Sudamérica Rugby Sevens joined automatic qualifier Argentina at the 2022 Rugby World Cup Sevens.)	Argentina	Chile; Uruguay	3
Asia (Note: Asia did not have an automatic qualifier for the 2022 Rugby World Cup Sevens but the top two teams from the 2021 Asia Rugby Sevens Series won qualifier berths.)	—	Hong Kong; South Korea	2
Europe (Note: Europe: The top four teams from the 2022 European Qualifier event joined automatic qualifiers England, France and Scotland at the 2022 Rugby World Cup Sevens.)	England; France; Scotland	Germany; Ireland; Portugal; Wales	7
Oceania (Note: Oceania was not able to hold a qualifying tournament due to ongoing impacts of COVID-19 in 2021 and 2022. Fiji and New Zealand qualified automatically but the other three qualifiers were determined by placings in the World Rugby Sevens Series and Oceania Sevens. No Oceania teams played in the 2021 World Series but Australia and Samoa were given qualifier berths at the 2022 Rugby World Cup Sevens due to finishing 4th and 12th, respectively, in the 2020 World Series. Tonga gained the final berth by placing 5th in the 2019 Oceania Sevens, which was the last continental championship contested by the majority of eligible unions.)	Fiji; New Zealand (holders)	Australia; Samoa; Tonga	5
Totals	8	16	24

== Draw ==
The fourteen core teams from the World Rugby Sevens Series were seeded according to their points accumulated across the 2019–20 and 2021–22 seasons prior to July 2022.

Seed	Event Team	2019–20 Seed points	Best 7 of first 8 rounds in 2021–22								2021–22 Seed points	Total Seed points
Seed	Event Team	2019–20 Seed points	Dubai I	Dubai II	Málaga	Seville	Singapore	Vancouver	Toulouse	London	2021–22 Seed points	Total Seed points
1	South Africa	104	22	22	22	22	10	13	—	13	124	228
2	Australia	81	13	19	15	19	17	17	—	22	122	203
3	Fiji	83	15	8	1	—	22	19	22	17	104	187
4	Argentina	56	17	17	19	17	13	22	13	—	118	174
5	New Zealand	115	—	—	—	—	19	12	8	19	58	173
6	United States	72	19	11	12	13	12	—	10	7	84	156
7	France	74	8	15	13	10	8	10	17	—	81	155
8	England	77	4	5	17	12	—	10	12	10	70	147
9	Ireland	49	11	10	10	15	15	—	19	12	92	141
10	Canada	57	6	5	10	2	—	7	1	3	34	91
11	Samoa	33	—	—	—	1	10	15	15	15	56	89
12	Scotland	37	4	5	5	10	—	5	7	5	41	78
13	Kenya	35	10	12	—	8	5	1	1	1	38	73
14	Wales	13	4	5	7	3	5	5	2	—	31	44

The remaining ten teams were seeded based on rankings gained at the 2020 World Rugby Sevens Challenger Series and regional ranking positions in July 2022.

Seed	Team
15	Hong Kong
16	Germany
17	Chile
18	Uruguay
19	South Korea
20	Tonga
21	Jamaica
22	Uganda
23	Zimbabwe
24	Portugal

== Match officials ==
World Rugby announced a panel of ten match officials for the men's tournament.

- Gianluca Gnecchi (Italy)
- Adam Leal (England)
- Jérémy Rozier (France)
- Morné Ferreira (South Africa)
- Reuben Keane (Australia)

- Jordan Way (Australia)
- Nick Hogan (New Zealand)
- AJ Jacobs (South Africa)
- Tevita Rokovereni (Fiji)
- Francisco González (Uruguay)

== Format ==
Like the previous edition, the tournament was played using a knock-out format.

- Teams in the Championship Cup competed for the Melrose Cup and gold, silver and bronze medals.
- Losing teams in the Championship Cup Quarter-finals competed for fifth place.
- Losing teams in the Championship Cup Round of 16 (second round) competed for the Challenge Trophy.
- Losing teams in the Championship Cup Pre-round of 16 (first round) competed for the Bowl.
- Losing teams in the Challenge Trophy Quarter-finals competed for 13th Place.
- Losing teams in the Bowl Quarter-finals competed for 21st Place.
- Teams entering in the Pre-round of 16 (first round) in the Championship Cup played a minimum of four matches and a maximum of five matches.
- Teams entering in the Round of 16 (second round) in the Championship Cup played four matches.

=== Tournament ===
Match results as per the official website:

All times are local (UTC+2).

=== Pre-Round of 16 ===
Match 1	9 September	(9) Ireland	24–0	Portugal (24)	Cape Town Stadium
	08:45

Match 2	9 September	(10) Canada	31–7	Zimbabwe (23)	Cape Town Stadium
	09:07

Match 3	9 September	(11) Samoa	33–7	Uganda (22)	Cape Town Stadium
	09:29

Match 4	9 September	(12) Scotland	24–7	Jamaica (21)	Cape Town Stadium
	09:51

Match 5	9 September	(13) Kenya	19–0	Tonga (20)	Cape Town Stadium
	10:23

Match 6	9 September	(14) Wales	33–10	South Korea (19)	Cape Town Stadium
	10:45

Match 7	9 September	(15) Hong Kong	7–19	Uruguay (18)	Cape Town Stadium
	11:07

Match 8	9 September	(16) Germany	12–15	Chile (17)	Cape Town Stadium
	11:29

=== 21st place ===
21st–24th semifinals
10 September – Cape Town Stadium
Portugal	31
Jamaica	7
10 September – Cape Town Stadium
South Korea	21
Zimbabwe	19

21st-place final
11 September – Cape Town Stadium
Portugal	10
South Korea	12
23rd-place final
11 September – Cape Town Stadium
Jamaica	17
Zimbabwe	31

Matches

21st–24th semi-finals

Match 29	10 September	Portugal	31–7	Jamaica	Cape Town Stadium
	13:17

Match 30	10 September	South Korea	21–19	Zimbabwe	Cape Town Stadium
	13:39

23rd-place final

Match 41	11 September	Jamaica	17–31	Zimbabwe	Cape Town Stadium
	08:52

21st-place final

Match 42	11 September	Portugal	10–12	South Korea	Cape Town Stadium
	08:30

=== Bowl ===
Bowl quarter-finals
10 September – Cape Town Stadium
Germany	21
Portugal	14
10 September – Cape Town Stadium
Jamaica	0
Tonga	17
10 September – Cape Town Stadium
South Korea	0
Uganda	12
10 September – Cape Town Stadium
Zimbabwe	0
Hong Kong	28

Bowl semi-finals
10 September – Cape Town Stadium
Germany	17
Tonga	12
10 September – Cape Town Stadium
Uganda	14
Hong Kong	5

Bowl final
11 September – Cape Town Stadium
Germany	12
Uganda	19
19th-place final
11 September – Cape Town Stadium
Tonga	0
Hong Kong	19

Matches

Bowl quarter-finals

Match 17	10 September	Portugal	14–21	Germany	Cape Town Stadium
	08:15

Match 18	10 September	Zimbabwe	0–28	Hong Kong	Cape Town Stadium
	08:37

Match 19	10 September	Uganda	12–0	South Korea	Cape Town Stadium
	08:59

Match 20	10 September	Jamaica	0–17	Tonga	Cape Town Stadium
	09:21

Match 31	10 September	Germany	17–12	Tonga	Cape Town Stadium
	14:01

Match 32	10 September	Hong Kong	5–14	Uganda	Cape Town Stadium
	14:23

19th-place final

Match 43	11 September	Tonga	0–19	Hong Kong	Cape Town Stadium
	09:14

Bowl final

Match 44	11 September	Germany	12–19	Uganda	Cape Town Stadium
	09:36

=== 13th place ===
16th–13th semi-finals
10 September – Cape Town Stadium
Scotland	21
Chile	24
10 September – Cape Town Stadium
Canada	33
Wales	19

13th-place final
11 September – Cape Town Stadium
Chile	10
Canada	12
15th-place final
11 September – Cape Town Stadium
Scotland	21
Wales	24

Matches

13th–16th semi-finals

Match 33	10 September	Chile	24–21	Scotland	Cape Town Stadium
	16:53

Match 34	10 September	Canada	33–19	Wales	Cape Town Stadium
	17:15

15th-place final

Match 45	11 September	Scotland	21–24	Wales	Cape Town Stadium
	15:58

13th-place final

Match 46	11 September	Chile	10–12	Canada	Cape Town Stadium
	16:20

=== Challenge Trophy ===
Challenge quarter-finals
10 September – Cape Town Stadium
England	35
Chile	0
10 September – Cape Town Stadium
Kenya	24
Scotland	5
10 September – Cape Town Stadium
United States	33
Wales	5
10 September – Cape Town Stadium
Uruguay	19
Canada	12

Challenge semi-finals
10 September – Cape Town Stadium
England	36
Kenya	0
10 September – Cape Town Stadium
United States	19
Uruguay	21

Challenge final
11 September – Cape Town Stadium
England	28
Uruguay	5
11th-place final
11 September – Cape Town Stadium
Kenya	19
United States	26

Matches

Challenge quarter-finals

Match 21	10 September	England	35–0	Chile	Cape Town Stadium
	11:31

Match 22	10 September	Canada	12–19	Uruguay	Cape Town Stadium
	11:53

Match 23	10 September	United States	33–5	Wales	Cape Town Stadium
	12:15

Match 24	10 September	Scotland	5–24	Kenya	Cape Town Stadium
	12:37

Challenge semi-finals

Match 35	10 September	Uruguay	21–19	United States	Cape Town Stadium
	17:37

Match 36	10 September	England	36–0	Kenya	Cape Town Stadium
	17:59

11th-place final

Match 47	11 September	United States	26–19	Kenya	Cape Town Stadium
	16:42

Challenge final

Match 48	11 September	Uruguay	5–28	England	Cape Town Stadium
	17:04

=== 5th place ===
5th–8th semi-finals
11 September – Cape Town Stadium
South Africa	19
Argentina	26
11 September – Cape Town Stadium
Samoa	17
France	24

5th-place final
11 September – Cape Town Stadium
Argentina	10
France	7
7th-place final
11 September – Cape Town Stadium
South Africa	35
Samoa	5

Matches

5th–8th semi-finals

Match 37	11 September	South Africa	19–26	Argentina	Cape Town Stadium
	11:02

Match 38	11 September	France	24–17	Samoa	Cape Town Stadium
	11:24

7th-place final

Match 49	11 September	South Africa	35–5	Samoa	Cape Town Stadium
	18:15

5th-place final

Match 50	11 September	Argentina	10–7	France	Cape Town Stadium
	18:37

=== Championship ===
Round of 16
9 September – Cape Town Stadium
South Africa (1)	32
Chile (17)	5
9 September – Cape Town Stadium
Ireland (9)	17
England (8)	5
9 September – Cape Town Stadium
New Zealand (5)	43
Scotland (12)	5
9 September – Cape Town Stadium
Kenya (13)	7
Argentina (4)	22
9 September – Cape Town Stadium
Fiji (3)	29
Wales (14)	5
9 September – Cape Town Stadium
Samoa (11)	40
United States (6)	12
9 September – Cape Town Stadium
France (7)	19
Canada (10)	12
9 September – Cape Town Stadium
Uruguay (18)	0
Australia (2)	35

Quarter-finals
10 September – Cape Town Stadium
South Africa	14
Ireland	24
10 September – Cape Town Stadium
New Zealand	12
Argentina	5
10 September – Cape Town Stadium
Fiji	21
Samoa	10
10 September – Cape Town Stadium
France	5
Australia	14

Semi-finals
11 September – Cape Town Stadium
Ireland	10
New Zealand	17
11 September – Cape Town Stadium
Fiji	38
Australia	14

Championship Final
11 September – Cape Town Stadium
New Zealand	12
Fiji	29
Bronze Final
11 September – Cape Town Stadium
Ireland	19
Australia	14

Matches

Round of 16

Match 9	9 September	England	5–17	Ireland	Cape Town Stadium
	14:39

Match 10	9 September	France	19–12	Canada	Cape Town Stadium
	15:02

Match 11	9 September	United States	12–40	Samoa	Cape Town Stadium
	15:39

Match 12	9 September	New Zealand	43–5	Scotland	Cape Town Stadium
	16:01

Match 13	9 September	Argentina	22–7	Kenya	Cape Town Stadium
	16:23

Match 15	9 September	Australia	35–0	Uruguay	Cape Town Stadium
	16:45

Match 14	9 September	Fiji	29–5	Wales	Cape Town Stadium
	18:05

Match 16	9 September	South Africa	32–5	Chile	Cape Town Stadium
	19:03

Quarter-finals

Match 28	10 September	New Zealand	12–5	Argentina	Cape Town Stadium
	19:35

Match 26	10 September	France	5–14	Australia	Cape Town Stadium
	20:35

Match 27	10 September	Samoa	10–21	Fiji	Cape Town Stadium
	21:35

Match 25	10 September	Ireland	24–14	South Africa	Cape Town Stadium
	22:33

Semi-finals

Match 39	11 September	Ireland	10–17	New Zealand	Cape Town Stadium
	12:35

Match 40	11 September	Australia	14–38	Fiji	Cape Town Stadium
	13:33

Bronze final

Match 51	11 September	Ireland	19–14	Australia	Cape Town Stadium
	19:25	Try: Crubbin, McNulty, Kennedy; Con: Dardis, Roche	Report	Try: Lawson, Toole; Con: Dunbar (2)	Referee: Nick Hogan

Championship Cup final

Match 52	11 September	New Zealand	12–29	Fiji	Cape Town Stadium
	20:54

== Final placings ==
Place	Team
1st place, gold medalist(s)	Fiji
2nd place, silver medalist(s)	New Zealand
3rd place, bronze medalist(s)	Ireland
4	Australia
5	Argentina
6	France
7	South Africa
8	Samoa
9	England
10	Uruguay
11	United States
12	Kenya
13	Canada
14	Chile
15	Wales
16	Scotland
17	Uganda
18	Germany
19	Hong Kong
20	Tonga
21	South Korea
22	Portugal
23	Zimbabwe
24	Jamaica

== Attendance ==
More than 105,000 spectators attended the three day tournament.

== Leading scorers ==
Tries scored
Rank	Player	Tries
1	Steve Onosai	7
2	Baltazar Amaya	5
3	Angelo Davids	4
3	Jeong Yeon-sik	4
3	Kaminieli Rasaku	4
3	Ngarohi McGarvey-Black	4
3	Perry Baker	4
3	Vincent Onyala	4
3	Will Homer	4

Points scored
Rank	Player	Points
1	Brock Webster	35
1	Steve Onosai	35
2	Baltazar Amaya	25
2	Jean-Pascal Barraque	25
5	Akuila Rokolisoa	23
5	Maurice Longbottom	23
5	Melani Matavao	23
5	Waisea Nacuqu	23

== Dream Team ==
The 2022 Rugby Sevens World Cup Dream team is:

Player	Country
Joseva Talacolo	Fiji
Jerry Tuwai	Fiji
Kaminieli Rasaku	Fiji
Harry McNulty	Ireland
Terry Kennedy	Ireland
Scott Curry	New Zealand
Ngarohi McGarvey-Black	New Zealand

== See also ==
- 2022 Rugby World Cup Sevens – Women's tournament
