= Jerry Matana =

Fijian rugby union player

- Born: 14 July 1998 (age 28)
- Height: 1.87 m (6 ft 2 in)
- Weight: 86 kg (190 lb)

Rugby union career
National sevens team
Years	Team	Comps
- Fiji
Medal record
Men's rugby sevens
Representing Fiji
Olympic Games
Silver medal – second place	2024 Paris	Team competition
Commonwealth Games
Silver medal – second place	2022 Birmingham	Team
Rugby Sevens World Cup
Gold medal – first place	2022 Cape Town	Team competition

Jerry Matana (born 14 July 1998) is a Fijian rugby sevens player. He was part of the Fiji sevens team that won a silver medal at the 2022 Commonwealth Games. He also won a gold medal at the 2022 Rugby World Cup Sevens in Cape Town.

He was part of the Fijian side that won a silver medal at the 2024 Summer Olympics in Paris.
