= Matt Gonzalez (rugby union) =

Australian rugby sevens player

- Born: 1 June 1986 (age 40) Baulkham Hills, NSW
- Height: 160 cm (5 ft 3 in)
- Weight: 90 kg (198 lb; 14 st 2 lb)
- School: Oakhill College

Rugby union career
- Position: Scrum-half
National sevens team
Years	Team	Comps
2022–	Australia	
- Correct as of 26 July 2024

Matt Gonzalez (born 1 June 1994) is an Australian rugby sevens player.

== Rugby career ==
Gonzalez was born in Baulkham Hills to an Argentinian father and an Australian mother. He started playing rugby at age seven. He played for Eastwood Rugby Club when they won the Shute Shield in 2015. He is a fitness trainer by profession.

He made his sevens debut for Australia in the Singapore leg of the World Series Sevens in April 2022. He competed for Australia at the 2022 Commonwealth Games in Birmingham, England.

In April 2024, he suffered an elbow injury that threatened to end his Olympic campaign. He eventually made the Australian squad for the Summer Olympics in Paris.
