= Vuiviawa Naduvalo =

- Born: 23 May 1996 (age 30)
- Height: 1.75 m (5 ft 9 in)
- Weight: 78 kg (172 lb)

Rugby union career
Senior career
Years	Team	Apps	(Points)
2026	Kolkata Banga Tigers		
National sevens team
Years	Team		Comps
- Fiji
Medal record
Men's rugby sevens
Representing Fiji
Commonwealth Games
Silver medal – second place	2022 Birmingham	Team
Rugby Sevens World Cup
Gold medal – first place	2022 Cape Town	Team competition

Vuiviawa Naduvalo (born 23 May 1996 27Y.O) is a Fijian rugby sevens player.

Naduvalo was part of the Fiji sevens team that won a silver medal at the 2022 Commonwealth Games. He also won a gold medal at the 2022 Rugby World Cup Sevens in Cape Town.
