= Che Clark =

New Zealand rugby union player

- Born: 22 April 2003 (age 23) Auckland, New Zealand
- Height: 1.94 m (6 ft 4 in)
- Weight: 101 kg (223 lb; 15 st 13 lb)
- School: King's College

Rugby union career
- Position: Flanker
- Current team: Auckland
Senior career
Years	Team	Apps	(Points)
2023–	Auckland	10	(5)
2025–	Blues	2	(0)
- Correct as of 1 December 2023
International career
Years	Team	Apps	(Points)
2023	New Zealand U20	4	(10)
- Correct as of 1 December 2023
National sevens team
Years	Team		Comps
2022–	New Zealand		8
- Correct as of 1 December 2023
Medal record
Men's rugby sevens
Representing New Zealand
Commonwealth Games
Bronze medal – third place	2022 Birmingham	Team competition

Che Clark (born 22 April 2003) is a New Zealand professional rugby union player who plays as a flanker for National Provincial Championship club Auckland and the New Zealand national sevens team.

== International career ==
Clark was named in the All Blacks Sevens squad for the 2022 Commonwealth Games in Birmingham. He won a bronze medal at the event.
