= Filipe Sauturaga =

Fijian rugby union player

- Born: 19 June 1994 (age 32)
- Height: 1.7 m (5 ft 7 in)
- Weight: 80 kg (176 lb)

Rugby union career
Senior career
Years	Team	Apps	(Points)
2025–	Chennai Bulls		
National sevens team
Years	Team		Comps
- Fiji
Medal record
Men's rugby sevens
Representing Fiji
Olympic Games
Silver medal – second place	2024 Paris	Team
Commonwealth Games
Silver medal – second place	2022 Birmingham	Team
Rugby Sevens World Cup
Gold medal – first place	2022 Cape Town	Team competition

Filipe Sauturaga (born 19 June 1994) is a Fijian rugby sevens player.

Sauturaga competed for the Fiji sevens team that won a silver medal at the 2022 Commonwealth Games. He was also a member of the team that won a gold medal at the 2022 Rugby World Cup Sevens in Cape Town.

He was part of the Fijian side that won a silver medal at the 2024 Summer Olympics in Paris.
