= Sevuloni Mocenacagi =

Fiji rugby sevens player (b. 1990)

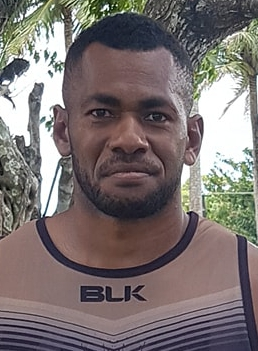
- Mocenacagi in 2021
- Born: 29 June 1990 (age 36)
- Height: 1.94 m (6 ft 4 in)
- Weight: 92 kg (203 lb)

Rugby union career
International career
Years	Team	Apps	(Points)
–	Fiji 7s		
Medal record
Men's rugby sevens
Representing Fiji
Olympic Games
Silver medal – second place	2024 Paris	Team competition
Commonwealth Games
Silver medal – second place	2022 Birmingham	Team
Rugby Sevens World Cup
Gold medal – first place	2022 Cape Town	Team competition

Sevuloni Mocenacagi MOF (born 19 June 1990) is a Fijian rugby player who plays as a forward or centre in the Fiji national rugby sevens team. According to Gareth Baber, the coach of the Fiji Sevens team: "Last year he [Mocenacagi] was a forward and this year we're using him in that centre position. He's a threat every time he gets the ball, he's a big powerful runner." Mocenacagi comes from Nukuilau, Navosa on the Island of Viti Levu.

== Career ==
Mocenacagi was part of the Fiji sevens team that won a silver medal at the 2022 Commonwealth Games. He also won a gold medal at the 2022 Rugby World Cup Sevens in Cape Town.

He was part of the Fijian side that won a silver medal at the 2024 Summer Olympics in Paris.

== Honours and awards ==
- Player of the Final Vancouver Sevens 2018
