= Morgan Williams (rugby union, born 1995) =

Welsh rugby player (born 1995)

- Born: Morgan Williams; 28 December 1995 (age 30) Caernarfon, Wales
- Height: 185 cm (6 ft 1 in)
- Weight: 88 kg (194 lb; 13 st 12 lb)

Rugby union career
- Position: Fullback/Wing
- Current team: Scarlets
Senior career
Years	Team	Apps	(Points)
2014–17	Aberavon	32	(51)
- Correct as of 29 October 2017
Provincial / State sides
Years	Team	Apps	(Points)
2014–17	Ospreys	2	(0)
2017–	Scarlets	12	(10)
- Correct as of 15 July 2022
National sevens teams
Years	Team		Comps
2016–	Wales Sevens		
2021–	Great Britain Sevens		
- Correct as of August 2022
Medal record
Men's rugby sevens
Representing Great Britain
European Games
Silver medal – second place	2023 Kraków–Małopolska	Team competition

Morgan Williams (born 28 December 1995) is a Welsh rugby union player who plays at fullback for the Wales rugby sevens team and the Great Britain rugby sevens team. He has previously played at wing and fullback for Scarlets and for Aberavon RFC. His appearances for Wales sevens have included the 2018 Commonwealth Games in Gold Coast and the 2022 Commonwealth Games in Birmingham. He appeared for Great Britain in the 2021 and 2021–22 World Rugby Sevens Series.

Williams was selected for the Wales squad for the 2022 Rugby World Cup Sevens in Cape Town.
