= Elia Canakaivata =

Fiji international rugby union player

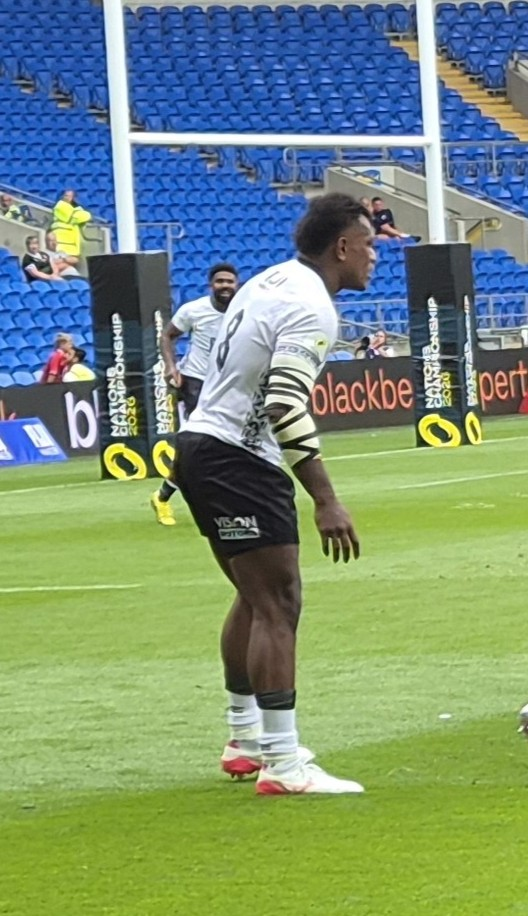
- 2026 Nations Championship in Cardiff, Wales
- Born: 12 July 1996 (age 30)

Rugby union career
- Position: Forward/Flanker
- Current team: Fijian Latui
Amateur team(s)
Years	Team	Apps	(Points)
- Fijian Latui
Senior career
Years	Team	Apps	(Points)
2023–2026	Fijian Drua	40	(50)
2026–	Sale Sharks	0	(0)
International career
Years	Team	Apps	(Points)
2024 -	Flying Fijians	19	(25)
National sevens team
Years	Team		Comps
2021–	Fiji		
Medal record
Men's rugby sevens
Representing Fiji
Commonwealth Games
Silver medal – second place	2022 Birmingham	Team
Rugby Sevens World Cup
Gold medal – first place	2022 Cape Town	Team competition

Elia Canakaivata (born 12 July 1996) is a Fijian rugby union player.

He made his Commonwealth Games debut representing Fiji at the 2022 Commonwealth Games. He made his test debut for the national team against Georgia in 2024. He is a utility loose forward that can slot in anywhere in the backrow.

He currently signed to the Fijian Drua where he mostly plays as a No.8 in the Super Rugby Pacific competition.

== Biography ==
Canakaivata was raised up in a village called Navunisole in the Tailevu Province of Fiji. He has also represented Fijian Army and played for Fijian Army rugby sevens side. His father and elder brother died in a road accident in December 2020 in Fiji.

== Career ==
Canakaivata played as a flanker for Northland side in Fiji's provincial 15-a-side competition before being part of the Fijian squad for the 2017 Central Coast Sevens.

In November 2021, he made his World Sevens Series debut in Dubai. He nearly came closer to quit the sport following the family tragedies in December 2020 but his mother convinced him to continue the sport amid the struggle. In April 2022, he scored his first international try in Fijian colours during the 2022 Singapore Sevens. He would then eventually be part of Fijian lineup which won the 2022 Singapore Sevens where Fiji edged past New Zealand in the final.

Canakaivata was a vital member of the Fijian team which defeated Ireland in the final to claim the Toulouse Sevens. He was member of the Fijian squad which won Plate Championship (bronze) at the 2022 London Sevens. In June 2022, he was selected for the Oceania Rugby Super Sevens.

Canakaivata was included in the Fijian rugby sevens squad for the 2022 Commonwealth Games and was part of the national squad which claimed silver medal in the men's rugby sevens tournament where Fiji lost to South Africa 7–31 in the final. He also won a gold medal at the 2022 Rugby World Cup Sevens in Cape Town.

On 23 February 2026, Canakaivata would move to England to sign for Sale Sharks on a two-year contract in the Premiership Rugby from the 2026–27 season.
