= 2021 Sudamérica Rugby Sevens =

- Host nation: Costa Rica
- Date: 27–28 November 2021

Cup
- Champion: Uruguay (2nd title)
- Runner-up: Chile
- Third: Brazil

Tournament details
- Matches played: 24

The 2021 Sudamérica Rugby Sevens was the 15th edition of the Sudamérica Sevens. It was held in San José, Costa Rica from 27–28 November. It was a qualifier for the 2022 World Rugby Sevens Challenger Series in Chile and 2022 Rugby World Cup Sevens in South Africa. Uruguay and Chile were the two teams that qualified as winner and runner-up.

== Format ==
The unconventional format for the tournament was played out in two/three parts: a pool stage (three teams per pool) in which three teams played each other once. This was followed by several inter-pool matches, with only the top two teams in each pool vying for a place in the semi-finals (teams whom finished bottom of their pool were vying for a placing position). Following the pool stage and ranking matches, there was a four team knockout round. The two semi-final winners qualified for the 2022 Rugby World Cup Sevens. The stadium of the tournament was Estadio Nacional de Costa Rica.

Stadium of the tournament, San José
Outside stadium

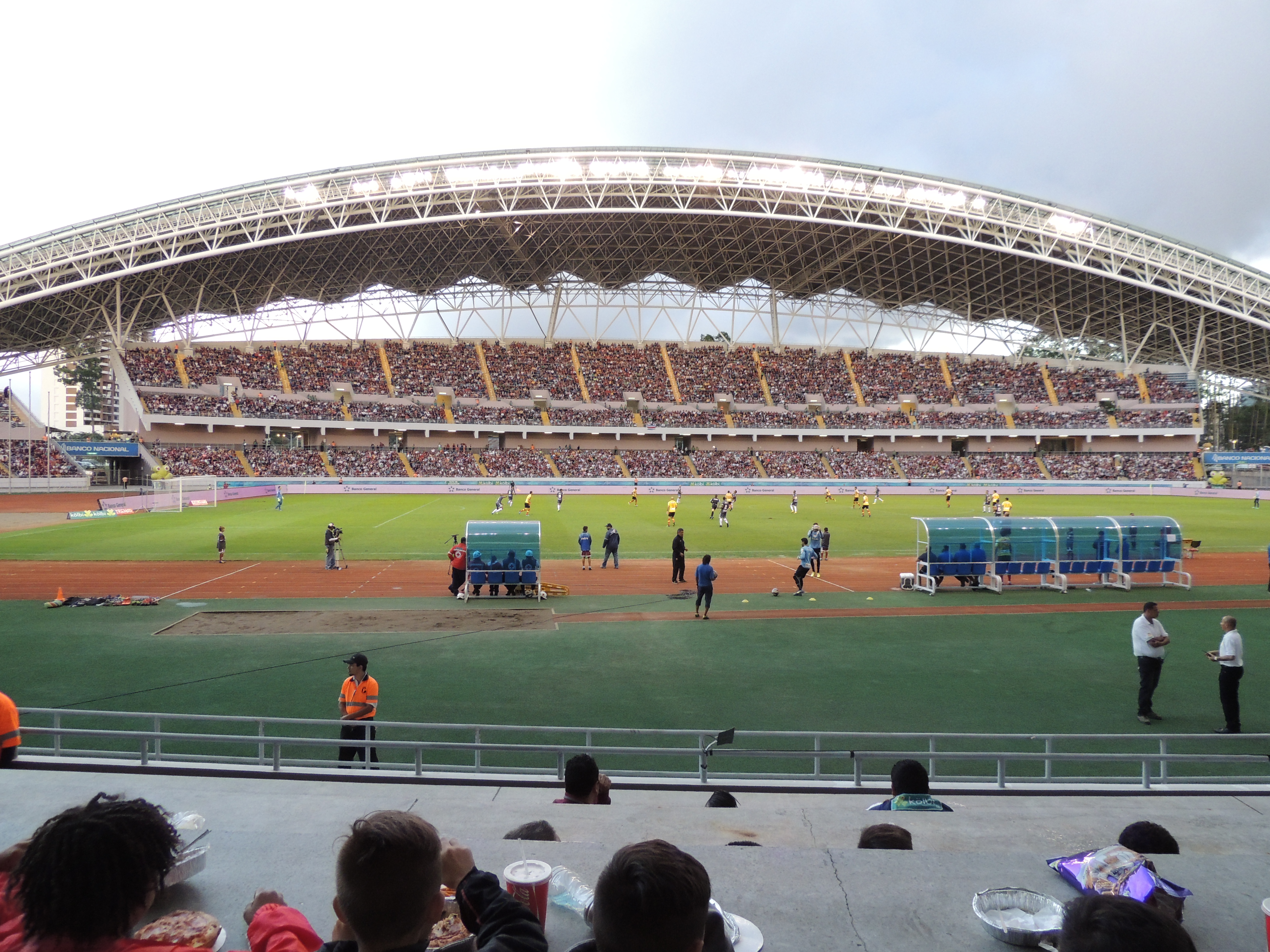
Inside stadium

== Teams ==
There were nine teams competing to qualify for the Rugby World Cup Sevens in Cape Town. As Argentina already qualified they didn't compete at the tournament.

- Brazil
- Chile
- Uruguay
- Guatemala
- Peru
- El Salvador
- Nicaragua
- Costa Rica
- Panama

== Pool stage – Phase I ==
=== Pool A ===
Team	Pld	W	D	L	PF	PA	±
Brazil	2	2	0	0	151	0	+151
Guatemala	2	1	0	1	17	92	–75
Panama	2	0	0	2	12	88	–76

27 November
CST (UTC–6)

Guatemala	17–12	Panama
	Report; Result

Estadio Nacional de Costa Rica

27 November
CST (UTC–6)

Brazil	71–0	Panama
	Report; Result

Estadio Nacional de Costa Rica

27 November
CST (UTC–6)

Brazil	80–0	Guatemala
	Report; Result

Estadio Nacional de Costa Rica

=== Pool B ===
Team	Pld	W	D	L	PF	PA	±
Chile	2	2	0	0	72	0	+72
Peru	2	1	0	1	27	43	–16
El Salvador	2	0	0	2	5	61	–56

27 November
CST (UTC–6)

Peru	27–5	El Salvador
	Report; Result

Estadio Nacional de Costa Rica

27 November
CST (UTC–6)

Chile	34–0	El Salvador
	Report; Result

Estadio Nacional de Costa Rica

27 November
CST (UTC–6)

Chile	38–0	Peru
	Report; Result

Estadio Nacional de Costa Rica

=== Pool C ===
Team	Pld	W	D	L	PF	PA	±
Uruguay	2	2	0	0	114	0	+114
Costa Rica	2	1	0	1	41	48	–7
Nicaragua	2	0	0	2	0	107	–107

27 November
CST (UTC–6)

Costa Rica	41–0	Nicaragua
	Report; Result

Estadio Nacional de Costa Rica

27 November
CST (UTC–6)

Uruguay	66–0	Nicaragua
	Report; Result

Estadio Nacional de Costa Rica

27 November
CST (UTC–6)

Uruguay	48–0	Costa Rica
	Report; Result

Estadio Nacional de Costa Rica

=== Inter-pool matches – Phase II ===
27 November
CST (UTC–6)

Panama	10–10	Nicaragua
	Report; Result

Estadio Nacional de Costa Rica

27 November
CST (UTC–6)

Brazil	54–0	Costa Rica
	Report; Result

Estadio Nacional de Costa Rica

27 November
CST (UTC–6)

Uruguay	15–0	Chile
	Report; Result

Estadio Nacional de Costa Rica

28 November
CST (UTC–6)

Costa Rica	0–28	Peru
	Report; Result

Estadio Nacional de Costa Rica

28 November
CST (UTC–6)

Chile	55–0	Guatemala
	Report; Result

Estadio Nacional de Costa Rica

28 November
CST (UTC–6)

El Salvador	10–7	Panama
	Report; Result

Estadio Nacional de Costa Rica

28 November
CST (UTC–6)

Brazil	41–0	Peru
	Report; Result

Estadio Nacional de Costa Rica

28 November
CST (UTC–6)

Uruguay	58–0	Guatemala
	Report; Result

Estadio Nacional de Costa Rica

28 November
CST (UTC–6)

El Salvador	12–12	Nicaragua
	Report; Result

Estadio Nacional de Costa Rica

=== Aggregate table ===
Pos	Team	Pld	W	D	L	PF	PA	±	Qualification
1	Brazil	4	4	0	0	246	0	+246	Advance to Semi-finals
2	Uruguay	4	4	0	0	187	0	+187	Advance to Semi-finals
3	Chile	4	3	0	1	127	15	+112	Advance to Semi-finals
4	Peru	4	2	0	2	55	84	–29	Advance to Semi-finals
5	Costa Rica	4	1	0	3	41	130	–89	Eliminated in Phase II; advance to 5th–8th playoffs
6	Guatemala	4	1	0	3	17	205	–188	Eliminated in Phase II; advance to 5th–8th playoffs
7	El Salvador	4	1	1	2	27	80	–53	Eliminated in Phase II; advance to 5th–8th playoffs
8	Nicaragua	4	0	2	2	22	129	–107	Eliminated in Phase II; advance to 5th–8th playoffs
9	Panama	4	0	1	3	29	108	–79	Eliminated in Phase II

== Knockout stage ==
=== 5th–8th playoffs ===
Final
28 November – Estadio Nacional de Costa Rica
Costa Rica	15
Guatemala	12
7th Place Final
28 November – Estadio Nacional de Costa Rica
El Salvador	5
Nicaragua	7

Matches

Seventh place

28 November	El Salvador	5–7	Nicaragua	Estadio Nacional de Costa Rica
CST (UTC–6)		Result

Fifth place final

28 November	Costa Rica	15–12	Guatemala	Estadio Nacional de Costa Rica
CST (UTC–6)		Result

=== Cup playoffs ===
Semi-finals
28 November – Estadio Nacional de Costa Rica
Brazil	14
Chile	21
28 November – Estadio Nacional de Costa Rica
Uruguay	47
Peru	0

Final
28 November – Estadio Nacional de Costa Rica
Chile	0
Uruguay	21
Third place
28 November – Estadio Nacional de Costa Rica
Brazil	47
Peru	0

Matches

Semi-finals

28 November	Brazil	14–21	Chile	Estadio Nacional de Costa Rica
CST (UTC–6)		Result

28 November	Uruguay	47–0	Peru	Estadio Nacional de Costa Rica
CST (UTC–6)		Result

Third place

28 November	Brazil	47–0	Peru	Estadio Nacional de Costa Rica
CST (UTC–6)		Result

Cup final

28 November	Chile	0–21	Uruguay	Estadio Nacional de Costa Rica
CST (UTC–6)		Result

== Final standings ==
Legend
	Qualified for the 2022 Rugby World Cup Sevens

Pos	Team
1	Uruguay
2	Chile
3	Brazil
4	Peru
5	Costa Rica
6	Guatemala
7	Nicaragua
8	El Salvador
9	Panama
