= Shaun Williams (rugby union) =

South African international rugby union player

- Born: 13 April 1998 (age 28) Mooinooi, South Africa
- Height: 174 cm (5 ft 9 in)
- Weight: 78 kg (172 lb)

Rugby union career
- Position(s): Scrum-half ,Fullback, Wing
Senior career
Years	Team	Apps	(Points)
2018-2024	Golden Lions		
2024-	Akita Northern Bullets	8	(32)
International career
Years	Team	Apps	(Points)
2021 -	South Africa		
Medal record
Men's rugby sevens
Representing South Africa
Olympic Games
Bronze medal – third place	2024 Paris	Team competition
Commonwealth Games
Gold medal – first place	2022 Birmingham	Team competition

Shaun Williams (born 13 April 1998) is a South African rugby union player.

Williams hails from a small community of Mooinooi on the platinum belt in the North West province. He attended Garsfontein High School in Pretoria on a bursary as a boarder. He was signed by the Golden Lions and he played for them at U19 and U21 levels, before making his senior debut for the team in the SuperSport Rugby Challenge. Williams was first called into the Blitzbok South African sevens squad in September 2021.

Williams played in the 2022 Commonwealth Games where South Africa won the gold medal. He competed for South Africa at the 2024 Summer Olympics in Paris. They defeated Australia to win the bronze medal final.
