= Ewan Rosser =

Welsh rugby union player

- Born: 16 December 2000 (age 25) Abergavenny, Wales
- Height: 178 cm (5 ft 10 in)
- Weight: 85 kg (187 lb)

Rugby union career
- Position: Wing
- Current team: Dragons
Senior career
Years	Team	Apps	(Points)
2021–	Dragons	1	(0)
- Correct as of 12:04, 6 February 2024 (UTC)
International career
Years	Team	Apps	(Points)
2020	Wales U20	2	(0)
- Correct as of 23 January 2022
National sevens team
Years	Team		Comps
2022–	Wales Sevens		1
- Correct as of 23 January 2022

Ewan Rosser (born 16 December 2000) is a Welsh rugby union player for Dragons in the United Rugby Championship. Rosser's primary position is wing.

== Rugby Union career ==
=== Professional career ===
Rosser was named in the Dragons academy squad for the 2021–22 season. He is yet to debut for the Dragons, but has represented Wales Sevens at one tournament. In 2022, he competed for Wales at the Rugby World Cup Sevens in Cape Town.
