= Waisea Nacuqu =

Fiji rugby sevens player (born 1993)

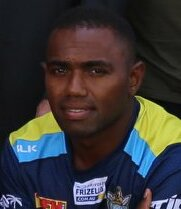
- Nacuqu in 2018
- Born: 24 May 1993 (age 33) Votua, Ba Province, Fiji
- Height: 1.70 m (5 ft 7 in)
- Weight: 82 kg (181 lb)
- Notable relative(s): Pio Tuwai, Josua Tuisova (cousins)
- Occupation: Rugby sevens player

Rugby union career
- Current team: Fiji rugby sevens
Senior career
Years	Team	Apps	(Points)
2025–	Mumbai Dreamers		
International career
Years	Team	Apps	(Points)
–	Fiji 7s		
Medal record
Men's rugby sevens
Representing Fiji
Olympic Games
Gold medal – first place	2020 Tokyo	Team competition
Silver medal – second place	2024 Paris	Team competition
Commonwealth Games
Silver medal – second place	2022 Birmingham	Team competition
Rugby Sevens World Cup
Gold medal – first place	2022 Cape Town	Team competition

Waisea Nacuqu (/nəˈðʊŋɡuː, -θʊŋ-/ nə-THUUNG-goo, born 24 May 1993) is a Fiji national rugby sevens team player. Nacuqu is known as "game breaker" and has on many occasions scored match winning tries. He is well known for his speed and scoring tries.

== Early life ==
Nacuqu is from Votua village near the township of Ba near the bank of Ba River. He refused to go back to school after Class 7 at Votua Catholic School and played Soccer for Tavua and rugby for the Westfield Tokatoka Barbarians in Nadi.

== Career ==
Nacuqu scored the winning try in the 2014 Tokyo sevens final against South Africa. He was part of the Fiji sevens team that won a silver medal at the 2022 Commonwealth Games. He later won a gold medal at the 2022 Rugby World Cup Sevens in Cape Town.

He was part of the Fijian side that won a silver medal at the 2024 Summer Olympics in Paris.

== Personal life ==
Nacuqu is a cousin for Former Fiji 7's player Pio Tuwai and current Flying Fijian, Josua Tuisova.

== Awards and honours ==
- Player of the final 2018 Singapore Sevens
