= Caleb Tangitau =

New Zealand rugby union player

- Born: 19 March 2003 (age 23)
- Height: 188 cm (6 ft 2 in)
- Weight: 98 kg (216 lb; 15 st 6 lb)

Rugby union career
Provincial / State sides
| Years | Team | Apps | (Points) |
| 2022– | Auckland | 19 | (60) |
Super Rugby
| Years | Team | Apps | (Points) |
| 2023-24 | Blues | 5 | (0) |
| 2025- | Highlanders | 18 | (65) |
International career
| Years | Team | Apps | (Points) |
| 2023 | New Zealand U20 | 4 | (25) |
National sevens team
| Years | Team | | Comps |
| 2022 | New Zealand | | 21 (85) |
Medal record
Men's rugby sevens
Representing New Zealand
Commonwealth Games
| Bronze medal – third place | 2022 Birmingham | Team competition |
Rugby World Cup Sevens
| Silver medal – second place | 2022 Cape Town | Team competition |

Caleb Tangitau (born 19 March 2003) is a New Zealand rugby player.

Tangitau was named in the All Blacks Sevens squad for the 2022 Commonwealth Games in Birmingham. He won a bronze medal at the event. He competed for New Zealand at the Rugby World Cup Sevens in Cape Town. His team won a silver medal after losing to Fiji in the gold medal final.
