= Nigel Ratwatte =

- Born: Sharana Nigel Patrick Ratwatte; 30 April 1990 (age 36) Kandy
- Height: 1.75 m (5 ft 9 in)
- Weight: 80 kg (12 st 8 lb; 176 lb)
- School: Trinity College, Kandy

Rugby union career
- Position: Fullback
- Current team: Kandy SC
Senior career
Years	Team	Apps	(Points)
2007-2008	Western Cowboys		
2009-11	CR&FC		
2012-2013	Up Country Lions		
2014–present	Kandy SC		
International career
Years	Team	Apps	(Points)
2007-2008	Mauritius		
2014–present	Sri Lanka	5	
- Correct as of 1 May 2015
National sevens team
Years	Team		Comps
2012–present	Sri Lanka 7s		

Nigel Ratwatte (born 30 April 1990) is a Sri Lankan rugby union player who is the current captain of Kandy SC in Dialog Rugby League. He has represented Sri Lanka in both Rugby 7s and 15s. His usual position is Full-back but due to his versatility, he often covers Fly-Half and Inside Centre.

== Biography ==
Ratwatte began his education at Trinity College in Kandy, Sri Lanka, where he captained the school's under-13 team. At the age of thirteen his family moved to Mauritius, where he played competitive rugby at St. Nicholas' Grammar School and at the Black River Rugby Club. In 2007 he was selected to represent the national under-18 team during a tour of Madagascar. At eighteen he was selected to play for the Mauritius national rugby union team, becoming the first Sri Lankan national to play for a foreign national rugby team.

Ratwatte completed his schooling in South Africa at the King Edward VII School in Johannesburg. He was successful in completing the Matrix Examination which is equivalent to the Sri Lanka's Advanced Level Exam.

In 2009 Ratwatte played for the Division 'A' rugby union team, Ceylonese Rugby & Football Club in the Sri Lankan Rugby League competition before transferring to the Up Country Lions in 2012 Following the demise of the Up Country Lions he signed with Kandy SC.

In 2012 he made his international debut with the Sri Lankan national rugby sevens team, competing at the HSBC Asian Sevens tournament.

He played his first game with the Sri Lanka national rugby union team in March 2014 against Portugal.

== See also ==
- Rugby union in Sri Lanka
