= Alec Coombes =

Scottish rugby union player

- Born: 26 November 1995 (age 30) Hong Kong
- Height: 1.87 m (6 ft 2 in)
- Weight: 100 kg (220 lb)

Rugby union career
- Position: Centre
- Current team: Glasgow Warriors
Senior career
Years	Team	Apps	(Points)
2015–2018	London Scottish	30	(45)
2019–	Glasgow Warriors	0	(0)
- Correct as of 12 September 2019
International career
Years	Team	Apps	(Points)
2017–	Scotland 7s	16	(85)
- Correct as of 23 March 2022

Alec Coombes (born 26 November 1995) is a Scottish rugby union player for Glasgow Warriors in the Pro14. Coombes' primary position is centre.

== Personal ==
Coombes attended Millfield School.

== Career ==
Coombes signed for Glasgow Warriors in the summer of 2019.
