= Josiah Morra =

Canadian rugby union and sevens player

- Born: February 7, 1998 (age 28) Toronto, Ontario, Canada
- Height: 180 cm (5 ft 11 in)
- Weight: 87 kg (192 lb)
- School: Brebeuf College School

Rugby union career
- Position: Wing
International career
| Years | Team | Apps | (Points) |
| 2022– | Canada | 3 | (0) |
Medal record
Men's rugby sevens
Representing Canada
Pan American Games
| Silver medal – second place | 2019 Lima | Team competition |

Josiah Morra (born February 7, 1998) is a Canadian international rugby union player.

Born in Toronto, Morra attended Brebeuf College School and picked up rugby during his high school years.

Morra made his international debut at the 2016 South Africa Sevens as an 18-year old. He has since been a regular member of Canada's rugby sevens side, including at the 2019 Pan American Games in Lima, where they were the silver medalists. In 2022, Morra debuted for the Canada XV in a match against the Netherlands.

== See also ==
- List of Canada national rugby union players
