= Jamie Adamson =

English rugby union player

- Born: 9 November 1999 (age 27) Bishop Auckland, England
- Height: 188 cm (6 ft 2 in)
- Weight: 102 kg (225 lb; 16 st 1 lb)
- University: Durham University

Rugby union career
- Position: Flanker / Number 8
Youth career
- Newcastle Falcons
Senior career
Years	Team	Apps	(Points)
2025–2026	Waratahs	21	(5)
- Correct as of 30 May 2026
National sevens teams
Years	Team		Comps
2019–2022	England Sevens		10
2023–2024	Great Britain Sevens		3
- Correct as of 11 January 2025

Jamie Adamson (born 9 November 1999) is an English rugby union player, who plays for the Waratahs. His preferred position is flanker or number 8.

== Early career ==
Born in Bishop Auckland, Adamson was a member of the Newcastle Falcons academy as a teenager, but injury problems meant he was never signed professionally. He attended Durham University to study a Bachelors degree in Economics and went on to complete a Masters in Finance, whilst representing the university in the BUCS Super Rugby competition. In 2022, Adamson was awarded a full palatinate for his rugby activities.

== Professional career ==
Adamson first professional appearances were for the England Sevens side making his debut in 2019 in Łódź. Adamson would then sign full-time for the Sevens team in 2021, following the competitions resumption following the COVID-19 pandemic and the 2020 Olympics, representing the side in 7 tournaments. He was then named in the side for both the 2022 Commonwealth Games and 2022 Rugby World Cup Sevens. He made three further Sevens appearances in 2023 and 2024 for the rebranded Great Britain Sevens side, before returning to the 15-aside game with Easts where his performances helped the side to their first Shute Shield success in 55 years. He was then named in the Waratahs squad for the 2025 Super Rugby Pacific season in January 2025 where he went on to make 11 appearances and re-sign for the 2026 season.
