= Kaminieli Rasaku =

Fijian rugby union player

- Born: 12 July 1999 (age 27)
- Height: 1.77 m (5 ft 10 in)
- Weight: 92 kg (203 lb)

Rugby union career
National sevens team
| Years | Team | Comps |
- Fiji
Medal record
Men's rugby sevens
Representing Fiji
Olympic Games
| Silver medal – second place | 2024 Paris | Team competition |
Commonwealth Games
| Silver medal – second place | 2022 Birmingham | Team |
Rugby Sevens World Cup
| Gold medal – first place | 2022 Cape Town | Team competition |

Kaminieli Rasaku (born 12 July 1999) is a Fijian rugby sevens player. He won a silver medal with the Fiji sevens team at the 2022 Commonwealth Games in Birmingham. He later won a gold medal at the 2022 Rugby World Cup Sevens in Cape Town.

He was part of the Fijian side that won a silver medal at the 2024 Summer Olympics in Paris.
