= Atieli Pakalani =

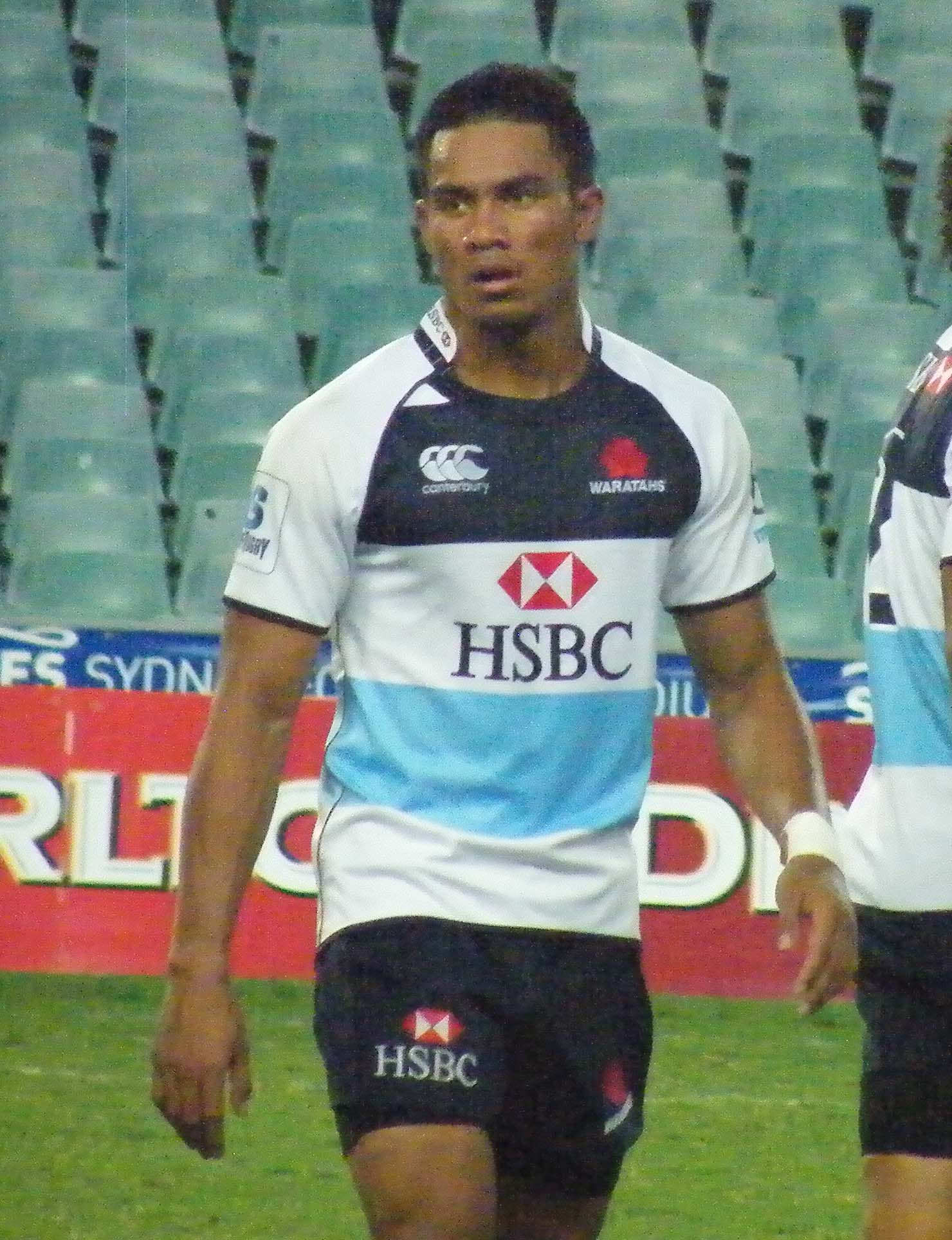
- Born: 2 August 1989 (age 37) Ha'ateiho, Tonga
- Height: 1.83 m (6 ft 0 in)
- Weight: 88 kg (13 st 12 lb)
- School: Tamaki College

Rugby union career
- Position(s): Wing, Fullback
Senior career
Years	Team	Apps	(Points)
2009–2010	Auckland	18	(20)
2011	Waratahs	14	(25)
2013–2016	Southern Districts	16	(30)
2014–2015	Greater Sydney Rams	4	(10)
2015–2016	Carcassonne	13	(5)
2017	Leicester Tigers	1	(0)
2018	NSW Country Eagles	3	(0)
2019	Eastwood Rugby Club	13	(15)
2020-2022	West Harbour RFC	0	(0)
- Correct as of 4 Mar 2020
International career
Years	Team	Apps	(Points)
2009	Tonga U20	5	(5)
2017–2019	Tonga	12	(10)
- Correct as of 4 March 2020
National sevens teams
Years	Team		Comps
2014	Australia		4
2018-2023	Tonga		37
- Correct as of 12 May 2018

Atieli Pakalani (born 2 August 1989) is a Tongan rugby union player. He is nicknamed the 'Tongan Hitman', and his usual position is on the wing. Pakalani played Super Rugby for the NSW Waratahs in 2011. In 2017 Pakalani joined Leicester Tigers.

== Biography ==
Pakalani attended secondary school at Tamaki College in New Zealand. He joined ITM Cup team Auckland in 2009 on a two-year deal. He also captained the Tongan Under 20 team at the 2009 IRB Junior World Championship.

In 2014 Pakalani represented Australia 7s at the time committing him to represent Australia only. In 2016 he was successful in an application to use a loophole in World Rugby's eligibility laws to allow him to represent Tonga and on 1 July 2017 he made his international debut for Tonga in a 2019 Rugby World Cup qualifier against Samoa.

Pakalani competed for Tonga at the 2022 Rugby World Cup Sevens in Cape Town.
