= Ronald Brown (rugby union) =

South African rugby player (born 1995)

- Born: 2 September 1995 (age 31)
- Height: 175 cm (5 ft 9 in)
- Weight: 75 kg (165 lb; 11 st 11 lb)

Rugby union career
National sevens team
Years	Team	Comps
- South Africa
Medal record
Men's rugby sevens
Representing South Africa
Olympic Games
Bronze medal – third place	2024 Paris	Team competition
Commonwealth Games
Gold medal – first place	2022 Birmingham	Team competition
Africa Men's Sevens
Silver medal – second place	2024 Mauritius	Team competition

Ronald Brown (born 2 September 1995) is a South African rugby sevens player. He competed in the men's tournament at the 2020 Summer Olympics. In 2022, He was part of the South African team that won their second Commonwealth Games gold medal in Birmingham.Ronald Brown was originally named as a traveling reserve for the 2024 Summer Olympics but was later called in to replace the injured Quewin Nortje, he competed for South Africa at the 2024 Summer Olympics in Paris.
