= 2021 Asia Rugby Sevens Series =

- Hosts: United Arab Emirates
- Date: 19–20 November 2021

Final positions
- Champions: Hong Kong (4th title)
- Runners-up: South Korea
- Third: Japan

Series details
- Matches played: 20
- Top try scorer: Cado Lee Ka To (5 tries)
- Top point scorer: Russell Webb (39 points)

The 2021 Asia Rugby Sevens Series was a rugby sevens tournament held in Dubai, United Arab Emirates in late November 2021. Following the cancellation of the 2020 series due to impacts of the COVID-19 pandemic, it was the twelfth edition of Asia's continental sevens circuit. The event acted as a qualifier for the 2022 World Rugby Sevens Challenger Series in Chile and the 2022 Rugby World Cup Sevens in South Africa. Hong Kong and South Korea qualified for both events.

Incheon, Huizhou and Colombo were originally scheduled as legs of the 2021 series, but all were eventually cancelled due to impacts of the COVID-19 pandemic and replaced by two events in the United Arab Emirates. This was eventually changed again to a single sevens event held in Dubai.

== Qualification ==
Five teams from West Asia played in a qualification tournament over two days to make up the eighth place at the Asia Rugby Sevens Series. The event was played as a round-robin and knockout, hosted by Qatar. Previous attendees United Arab Emirates won the tournament on 9 October.

Team	Qualified as	Qualified on	Previous appearances	Previous best performance
United Arab Emirates	Asia Rugby Trophy winner	9 October 2021	2 (2015, 2019)	Sixth place (Bangkok 2015, Colombo 2019)

== Teams ==
There were eight teams competing in the tournament, which only had one change from the previous one (2019):

- China
- Hong Kong
- Japan
- Malaysia
- Philippines
- South Korea
- Sri Lanka
- United Arab Emirates

== Pool stage ==
=== Pool A ===
Team	P	W	D	L	PF	PA	PD	Pts	Qualification
Hong Kong	3	3	0	0	97	12	+85	9	Advance to Cup playoffs
South Korea	3	2	0	1	93	21	+72	7	Advance to Cup playoffs
Philippines	3	1	0	2	19	87	–68	5	Advance to Plate playoffs
Malaysia	3	0	0	3	24	113	–89	3	Advance to Plate playoffs

19 November
13:58 GST (UTC+4)

South Korea	7–14	Hong Kong

Dubai

19 November
14:20 GST (UTC+4)

Philippines	19–12	Malaysia

Dubai

19 November
17:08 GST (UTC+4)

South Korea	46–0	Philippines

Dubai

19 November
17:30 GST (UTC+4)

Hong Kong	54–5	Malaysia

Dubai

19 November
20:18 GST (UTC+4)

South Korea	40–7	Malaysia

Dubai

19 November
20:40 GST (UTC+4)

Hong Kong	29–0	Philippines

Dubai

=== Pool B ===
Team	P	W	D	L	PF	PA	PD	Pts	Qualification
Japan	3	3	0	0	84	33	+51	9	Advance to Cup playoffs
China	3	2	0	1	61	43	+18	7	Advance to Cup playoffs
United Arab Emirates	3	1	0	2	65	63	+2	5	Advance to Plate playoffs
Sri Lanka	3	0	0	3	21	92	–71	3	Advance to Plate playoffs

19 November
14:42 GST (UTC+4)

Japan	31–14	Sri Lanka

Dubai

19 November
15:04 GST (UTC+4)

China	29–17	United Arab Emirates

Dubai

19 November
17:52 GST (UTC+4)

Japan	26–0	China

Dubai

19 November
18:14 GST (UTC+4)

Sri Lanka	7–29	United Arab Emirates

Dubai

19 November
21:02 GST (UTC+4)

Japan	27–19	United Arab Emirates

Dubai

19 November
21:24 GST (UTC+4)

Sri Lanka	0–32	China

Dubai

== Knockout stage ==
=== Plate playoffs ===
Plate Semi-finals
20 November – Dubai
Philippines	26
Sri Lanka	28
20 November – Dubai
United Arab Emirates	31
Malaysia	14

Plate Final
20 November – Dubai
Sri Lanka	10
United Arab Emirates	29
7th place Final
20 November – Dubai
Philippines	19
Malaysia	28

Semi-finals

20 November
16:28 GST (UTC+4)

Philippines	26–28	Sri Lanka

Dubai

20 November
16:50 GST (UTC+4)

United Arab Emirates	31–14	Malaysia

Dubai

Seventh place

20 November
18:44 GST (UTC+4)

Philippines	19–28	Malaysia

Dubai

Fifth place

20 November
19:06 GST (UTC+4)

Sri Lanka	10–29	United Arab Emirates

Dubai

=== Cup playoffs ===
Semi-finals
20 November – Dubai
Hong Kong	24
China	0
20 November – Dubai
Japan	14
South Korea	21

Final
20 November – Dubai
Hong Kong	33
South Korea	7
Third place
20 November – Dubai
China	19
Japan	26

Semi-finals

20 November
17:12 GST (UTC+4)

Hong Kong	24–0	China

Dubai

20 November
17:34 GST (UTC+4)

Japan	14–21	South Korea

Dubai

Third place

20 November
20:04 GST (UTC+4)

China	19–26	Japan

Dubai

Final

20 November
20:48 GST (UTC+4)

Hong Kong	33–7	South Korea

Dubai

== Final standings ==
Legend
	Qualified for the 2022 Rugby World Cup Sevens

Pos	Team
1	Hong Kong
2	South Korea
3	Japan
4	China
5	United Arab Emirates
6	Sri Lanka
7	Malaysia
8	Philippines

== See also ==
- 2021 Asia Rugby Women's Sevens Series
