= Cooper Coats =

Canadian rugby union and sevens player

- Full name: Cooper Coats
- Born: 6 October 1996 (age 30) Halifax, Nova Scotia, Canada
- Height: 1.83 m (6 ft 0 in)
- Weight: 87 kg (192 lb)
- School: Citadel High School
- University: Acadia University

Rugby union career
- Position(s): Flyhalf, Fullback
- Current team: Halifax Tars RFC
Senior career
Years	Team	Apps	(Points)
2016-2017	Halifax Tars RFC	??	(??)
2016-2018	Nova Scotia Keltics	??	(??)
2017-2018	Atlantic Rock	4	(44)
2018	Ontario Arrows	4	(0)
2018-	Halifax Tars RFC	??	(??)
- Correct as of 23 July 2023
International career
Years	Team	Apps	(Points)
2014	Canada under-18	??	(??)
2015	Canada under-20	??	(??)
2021-	Canada	9	(45)
- Correct as of 23 July 2023
National sevens team
Years	Team		Comps
2018-	Canada Sevens		15 (193)
- Correct as of 23 July 2023
Medal record
Men's rugby sevens
Representing Canada
Pan American Games
Silver medal – second place	2019 Lima	Team competition

Cooper Coats (born 6 October 1996) is a Canadian rugby union and sevens player, who plays for the Canada Sevens national team and Halifax Tars RFC.

== Career ==
He began playing rugby at 16 years old at Citadel High School, he was an originally a soccer player but his International Baccalaureate program required another sport. He decided to give rugby a try. Within six months he was playing for Canada's under-18 side.

He went on to feature in the Canada under-20 side before attending Acadia University on a soccer scholarship. He played club rugby during the summer with the Halifax Tars and Nova Scotia Keltics and in 2017 was drafted into the senior Atlantic Rock team for the Canadian Rugby Championship.

Coats played for the Ontario Arrows in their spring exhibition campaign in 2018. He led the Nova Scotia Keltics to an East Coast Super League title and then topped the Canadian Rugby Championship in scoring.

He made his debut for the Canada Sevens team traveling to Cape Town for the 2018 South Africa Sevens.

He made his debut for the Canada national team in a 68–12 loss against Wales where Coats scored his debut try.
