= Callum Williams =

Welsh rugby union player

- Born: 31 October 2001 (age 25) Haverfordwest, Wales
- Height: 175 cm (5 ft 9 in)
- Weight: 90 kg (200 lb; 14 st 2 lb)

Rugby union career
- Position: Wing / Fullback
- Current team: Scarlets
Senior career
Years	Team	Apps	(Points)
2021–2024	Scarlets	0	(0)
National sevens team
Years	Team		Comps
2022–2023	Wales Sevens		6

Callum Williams (born 31 October 2001) is a Welsh rugby union player who previously played Scarlets in the United Rugby Championship as a wing or fullback.

== Rugby Union career ==
=== Professional career ===
Williams was named in the Scarlets academy squad for the 2021–22 season. He is yet to debut for the Scarlets, but has represented Wales Sevens at one tournament.

Williams was released by the Scarlets at the end of the 2023–24 United Rugby Championship season.
