= Herman Humwa =

Kenyan rugby sevens player

- Born: Herman Humwa; 8 November 1995 (age 31) Nairobi
- Height: 187 cm (6 ft 2 in)
- Weight: 100 kg (220 lb)
- School: Koelel high School
- University: Moi university
- Occupation: Student

Rugby union career
- Position: Flanker
National sevens team
Years	Team	Comps
2018–present	Kenya 7s	

Herman Humwa (8 November 1995) is a Kenyan rugby sevens player who represents Kenya internationally.

Humwa made his Olympic debut representing Kenya at the 2020 Summer Olympics. He also competed for Kenya at the 2022 Rugby World Cup Sevens in Cape Town.

He represented Kenya at the 2024 Summer Olympics in Paris.
