= Ngarohi McGarvey-Black =

New Zealand rugby union player

- Born: 20 May 1996 (age 30) Rotorua, New Zealand
- Height: 1.86 m (6 ft 1 in)
- Weight: 90 kg (198 lb)
- School: Rotorua Boys' High School

Rugby union career
- Position: Wing
- Current team: Bay of Plenty
Senior career
Years	Team	Apps	(Points)
2020	North Harbour	3	(5)
2023–	Bay of Plenty	5	(10)
2026	Bengaluru Bravehearts		
- Correct as of 21 July 2024
International career
Years	Team	Apps	(Points)
2022–	New Zealand 7s	158	(504)
- Correct as of 21 July 2024
Medal record
Men's rugby sevens
Representing New Zealand
Summer Olympics
Silver medal – second place	2020 Tokyo	Team competition
Commonwealth Games
Bronze medal – third place	2022 Birmingham	Team competition
Rugby World Cup Sevens
Silver medal – second place	2022 Cape Town	Team competition

Ngarohi McGarvey-Black (born 20 May 1996) is a New Zealand professional rugby union player who plays as a wing for National Provincial Championship club Bay of Plenty and the New Zealand national sevens team.

== International career ==
McGarvey-Black made his New Zealand men's sevens debut in Las Vegas in 2018. In 2020 he was named New Zealand Rugby Players Association (NZRPA) Players' Player of the Year. He was named in the New Zealand squad for the Rugby sevens at the 2020 Summer Olympics.

McGarvey-Black was part of the All Blacks Sevens squad that won a bronze medal at the 2022 Commonwealth Games in Birmingham. He later competed at the 2022 Rugby World Cup Sevens in Cape Town. He won a silver medal after his side lost to Fiji in the gold medal final.

He represented New Zealand at the 2024 Summer Olympics in Paris. He continued to play for New Zealand in the 2024-25 SVNS series.

He was a try scorer in the third/fourth playoff at the SVNS World Championship in Los Angeles in May 2025 as New Zealand placed third overall. He continued with New Zealand Sevens for the 2025-26 season.
