= Nelson Oyoo =

Kenyan rugby sevens player

Personal information
- Nationality: Kenyan
- Born: 26 June 1994 (age 30)
- Height: 180 cm (5 ft 11 in)
- Weight: 82 kg (181 lb; 12 st 13 lb)

Sport
- Sport: Rugby sevens

Nelson Oyoo (born 26 June 1994) is a Kenyan rugby sevens player. Born in Molo, Nakuru County, he attended Molo Academy and later Njoro Boys' High School for his A-levels. He competed in the men's tournament at the 2020 Summer Olympics. He was also selected for the Kenyan squad for the 2022 Rugby World Cup Sevens in Cape Town and is the captain for the kenyan side
