= Brock Webster =

Canadian rugby union and sevens player

- Born: 21 August 2000 (age 26) Uxbridge, Ontario, Canada
- Height: 5 ft 11 in (180 cm)
- Weight: 180 lb (82 kg)
- School: Uxbridge Secondary School
- University: University of Victoria

Rugby union career
- Position(s): Fly Half, Wing
Amateur team(s)
Years	Team	Apps	(Points)
- Oshawa Vikings
2021	Pacific Pride		
Senior career
Years	Team	Apps	(Points)
2022	Toronto Arrows	5	(15)
2024–2025	New England Free Jacks	16	(20)
2026-	Chicago Hounds	11	(30)
- Correct as of 24 July 2026
International career
Years	Team	Apps	(Points)
2018	Canada U18		
2019	Canada U20		
2021–	Canada	9	(5)
- Correct as of 28 June 2025
National sevens team
Years	Team		Comps
2019	Canada		

Brock Webster (born 21 August 2000) is a Canadian professional rugby union player for the Chicago Hounds in the MLR. He has also played for the Canadian national team.

== Pro career ==
He played for the Toronto Arrows in Major League Rugby (MLR) for a year in 2022. He then signed with the New England Free Jacks in 2024. In 2025 he appeared in 16 games and would help lead the Free Jacks to the 2025 MLR championship. During the championship game Webster would make numerous aerial plays and two try assists helping the Free Jacks win the game 28-22. Webster was named the MVP of the championship match, the first Canadian to win the award.

Following the 2025 MLR season, Webster would be picked up by the Chicago Hounds, winning a second consecutive MLR Championship and being named the 2026 MLR Player of the Year, the first Canadian player to win the honor.

=== International career ===
Webster previously played for Canada U20s and for the Canada Sevens. In 2022, he competed for Canada at the Rugby World Cup Sevens in Cape Town. In 2018 he was named Rugby Canada's Young Player of the Year, having been capped in both 7s and 15s. In the 2022 Rugby Sevens World Cup he was Canada's top point-scorer.

Webster won his first 15s cap for Canada in the 2023 Rugby World Cup Qualifier versus the USA, scoring on his debut.

== Honours ==
- Major League Rugby Championship: (2025, 2026)
- 2025 Major League Rugby championship game MVP
- 2026 Major League Rugby Player of the Year
