= Will Homer =

English rugby union player

- Born: Will Homer; 24 October 1995 (age 31) Winchester, England
- Height: 1.81 m (5 ft 11 in)
- Weight: 82 kg (181 lb; 12 st 13 lb)
- School: Sherborne School

Rugby union career
- Position: Scrum half
Senior career
Years	Team	Apps	(Points)
2014-18	Bath	5	(20)
2017-18	→ Yorkshire Carnegie		
2018-20	Jersey Reds		
2020-	Scarlets		
–	Richmond		
- Correct as of 7 February 2015
International career
Years	Team	Apps	(Points)
- England U16
–	England U18		
Medal record
Men's rugby sevens
Representing Great Britain
European Games
Silver medal – second place	2023 Kraków–Małopolska	Team competition

Will Homer (born 24 October 1995) is an English professional rugby union player from Winchester, Hampshire. He plays at scrum half. Homer was signed by Jersey Reds from Bath Rugby on 2 May 2018, ahead of the RFU Championship 2018–2019 season.

== Career ==
Homer started playing rugby whilst at school at Sherborne School, playing for them in the NatWest Schools Cup. Homer originally played his club rugby at Andover RFC. He then joined Bath and played for the RFU Championship club Cornish Pirates on a dual registration with Bath. Homer made his Premiership Rugby debut for them in 2015 and went on to make sixteen first team appearances for them. In 2017, he was appointed as the captain of Bath's Premiership rugby sevens team but spent the rest of the season on dual-registration at the Championship team Yorkshire Carnegie in order to get playing time.

In 2018, Homer left Bath to play for RFU Championship Jersey Reds in order to get more first team rugby. In his first full season at Jersey, he was named as the scrum-half in the RFU Championship's team of the season. Homer underwent negotiations for a transfer to Premiership Wasps but the negotiations collapsed and the move fell through. He was part of the Jersey team that played against the Russia national rugby union team that was intended as a warm up for Russia's 2019 Rugby World Cup campaign. In 2020, he joined Jersey's director of rugby in leading criticism of plans by the Rugby Football Union to cut central funding for Championship clubs by 40%, citing Jersey's success in bringing up Premiership standard players.

=== Representative career ===
Homer represented the England national under-18 rugby union team whilst still at school. He later played for the England national under-20 rugby union team while at Bath.

== Personal life ==
Will Homer is the brother of fellow rugby player Tom Homer.
