= Steve Onosai =

Samoan rugby sevens player

- Born: 19 September 2001 (age 25)
- Height: 175 cm (5 ft 9 in)
- Weight: 86 kg (190 lb; 13 st 8 lb)

Rugby union career
National sevens team
Years	Team	Comps
2021–Present	Samoa	

Steve Onosai (born 19 September 2001) is a Samoan rugby sevens player. He competed for Samoa at the 2024 Summer Olympics in Paris.
