= 2022 Singapore Sevens =

- Sevens World Series XXIII
- Host nation: Singapore
- Date: 9–10 April 2022

Cup
- Champion: Fiji
- Runner-up: New Zealand
- Third: Australia

Tournament details
- Matches played: 45
- Tries scored: 275 (average 6.11 per match)
- Most points: Dietrich Roache (52 points)
- Most tries: Vuiviawa Naduvalo (10 tries)

The 2022 Singapore Sevens was a rugby sevens tournament played on 9–10 April 2022 at the National Stadium in Singapore. It was the ninth edition of the Singapore Sevens and the fifth tournament of the 2021–22 World Rugby Sevens Series. This was the first event in the series for which no invited teams featured in tournament, and all core teams were available.

In the cup final, it was Fiji who took out their record third Singapore title after they defeated New Zealand by 28–17. Australia narrowly defeated Ireland by 21–19 to finish in third place. The defending tournament champions from 2019, South Africa, finished in equal-seventh place, and also lost their thirty-six match win streak in the pool stage against the United States by 7–12. Following South Africa's loss in the pool stage, they lost back-to-back in the knockout stage to Fiji (19–14) and Argentina (22–15), respectively.

== Format ==
The sixteen teams were drawn into four pools of four. Each team played the three opponents in their pool once. The top two teams from each pool advanced to the Cup bracket, with the losers of the quarter-finals vying for a fifth place finish. The remaining eight teams that finished between either third or fourth in their pool played off for 9th place, with the losers of the 9th-place quarter-finals competing for 13th place.

== Teams ==
The sixteen national teams competing in Singapore were:

- Argentina
- Australia
- Canada
- England
- Fiji
- France
- Ireland
- Japan
- Kenya
- New Zealand
- Samoa
- Scotland
- South Africa
- Spain
- United States
- Wales

• Fiji returned from their absence since playing at the Dubai II event in November 2021.

• New Zealand returned to the Sevens Series for the first time since the 2020 Vancouver event on 8 March 2020.

• Samoa also played their first tournament of the series in Singapore, returning after a similar hiatus to the New Zealand team.

== Pool stage ==
Key: Team advanced to the quarterfinals

=== Pool A ===
Team	Pld	W	D	L	PF	PA	PD	Pts
United States	3	3	0	0	57	29	+28	9
South Africa	3	2	0	1	64	22	+42	7
Kenya	3	1	0	2	39	45	–6	5
Canada	3	0	0	3	24	88	–64	3

9 April
12:12 SGT (UTC+8)

United States	12–10	Kenya
Try: Perry Baker 5' m Kevon Williams 11' c Con: Folau Niua (0/1); Lucas Lacamp (1/1) 11'	Report	Try: Anthony Omondi 7' m Edmund Anya 13' m Con: Anthony Omondi (0/1) (Note: In Omondi's first conversion attempt he went over the allowed time for the kick.); Daniel Taabu (0/1)

National Stadium
Referee: Craig Chan (Hong Kong)

9 April
12:34 SGT (UTC+8)

South Africa	31–5	Canada
Try: JC Pretorius (2) 5' m, 15' m Siviwe Soyizwapi 7' m Darren Adonis 12' c Selvyn Davids 13' c Con: Ronald Brown (1/2) 7'; Dewald Human (2/2) 12', 14'; Lubabalo Dobela (0/1) (Note: In Dobela's first conversion attempt he went over the allowed time for the kick.)	Report	Try: David Richard 3' m

National Stadium
Referee: Reuben Keane (Australia)

9 April
15:18 SGT (UTC+8)

United States	33–12	Canada
Try: Lucas Lacamp 1' m Kevon Williams (2) 3' c, 5' c Perry Baker 8' c Marcus Tupuola 12' c Con: Lucas Lacamp (3/4) 4', 6', 9'; Kevon Williams (1/1) 13'	Report	Try: Alex Russell 7' c Anton Ngongo 15' m Con: Brennig Prevost (1/2) 8'

National Stadium
Referee: Morné Ferreira (South Africa)

9 April
15:40 SGT (UTC+8)

South Africa	26–5	Kenya
Try: Sakoyisa Makata (3) 1' c, 4' m, 9' c Selvyn Davids 2' c Con: Ronald Brown (3/4) 2', 3', 9'	Report	Try: Alvin Marube 15' m Cards: Alvin Marube (yellow card) 11'

National Stadium
Referee: Tevita Rokovereni (Fiji)

9 April
19:05 SGT (UTC+8)

Kenya	24–7	Canada
Try: Herman Humwa 4' m Kevin Wekesa 6' c Anthony Omondi 11' c Edmund Anya 13' m Con: Anthony Omondi (2) 6', 12'	Report	Try: Lockie Kratz 1' m Con: Brennig Prevost 1'

National Stadium
Referee: Nick Hogan (New Zealand)

9 April
19:33 SGT (UTC+8)

South Africa	7–12	United States
Try: Ryan Oosthuizen 13' c Con: Dewald Human 13'	Report	Try: David Still 2' c Perry Baker 15' m Con: Lucas Lacamp 2'

National Stadium
Referee: Jordan Way (Australia)

=== Pool B ===
Team	Pld	W	D	L	PF	PA	PD	Pts
Australia	3	3	0	0	94	29	+65	9
Samoa	3	2	0	1	74	45	+29	7
England	3	1	0	2	24	85	–61	5
Spain	3	0	0	3	40	73	–33	3

9 April
11:28 SGT (UTC+8)

England	19–14	Spain
Try: Jamie Adamson 3' c Frederick Roddick 5' c Ed Coulson 12' m Con: Frederick Roddick (2/2) 3', 6'; Ed Coulson (0/1)	Report	Try: Pol Pla 4' c Juan Ramos 7' c Con: Juan Ramos (2/2) 4', 8'

National Stadium
Referee: Jeremy Rozier (France)

9 April
11:50 SGT (UTC+8)

Australia	26–17	Samoa
Try: Matthew Gonzalez 3' c Josh Turner 8' m Corey Toole 10' c Timothy Clements 14' c Con: Dietrich Roache (2/3) 4', 10'; Maurice Longbottom (1/1) 15'	Report	Try: Uaina Sione 2' m Steve Rimoni (2) 8' m, 12' c Con: Melani Matavao (0/2); Steve Rimoni (1/1) 12'

National Stadium
Referee: Morné Ferreira (South Africa)

9 April
14:34 SGT (UTC+8)

England	5–31	Samoa
Try: Ed Coulson 15' m	Report	Try: Steve Rimoni 3' c Vaa Apelu Maliko 4' c Uaina Sione 7' m Melani Matavao 8' c Owen Fetu 12' m Con: Paul Scanlan (1/1) 3'; Melani Matavao (1/2) 4'; Iafeta Purcell (1/2) 8'; Cards: Faafoi Falaniko (yellow card) 14'

National Stadium
Referee: Reuben Keane (Australia)

9 April
14:56 SGT (UTC+8)

Australia	28–12	Spain
Try: Matthew Gonzalez (2) 3' c, 8' c Josh Turner (2) 6' c, 14' c Con: Dietrich Roache (3/3) 4', 7', 8'; Maurice Longbottom (1/1) 14'	Report	Try: Nicolás Nieto 9' m Pol Pla 12' c Con: Juan Martínez (1/2) 12'

National Stadium
Referee: Nick Hogan (New Zealand)

9 April
18:07 SGT (UTC+8)

Spain	14–26	Samoa
Try: Josep Serres 2' c Javier de Juan 3' c Con: Juan Ramos (2) 2', 4'	Report	Try: Uaina Sione 5' m Steve Rimoni 8' c Owen Fetu 9' c Indiha Saotui-Huta 13' c Con: Melani Matavao (2) 9', 9'; Iafeta Purcell 13'

National Stadium
Referee: Tevita Rokovereni (Fiji)

9 April
18:35 SGT (UTC+8)

Australia	40–0	England
Try: Dietrich Roache (2) 2' m, 14' c Corey Toole 3' c Henry Hutchison (2) 8' c, 8' c Timothy Clements 12' c Con: Dietrich Roache (5) 4', 8', 9', 12', 14'	Report

National Stadium
Referee: Jeremy Rozier (France)

=== Pool C ===
Team	Pld	W	D	L	PF	PA	PD	Pts
New Zealand	3	3	0	0	74	22	+52	9
Argentina	3	2	0	1	63	33	+30	7
Scotland	3	1	0	2	47	72	–25	5
Wales	3	0	0	3	36	93	–57	3

9 April
10:44 SGT (UTC+8)

Scotland	26–24	Wales
Try: Jordan Edmonds (4) 5' m, 8' c, 8' c, 10' c Con: Harvey Elms (3/4) 8', 8', 10'	Report	Try: Morgan Williams 2' c Chris Smith 3' c Ewan Rosser 13' m Callum Williams 14' m Con: Luke Treharne (2/2) 2', 4'; Arthur Lennon (0/2)

National Stadium
Referee: Reuben Keane (Australia)

9 April
11:06 SGT (UTC+8)

Argentina	10–12	New Zealand
Try: Luciano González 2' m Germán Schulz 8' m Con: Felipe del Mestre (0/2)	Report	Try: Sam Dickson 5' m Moses Leo 7' c Con: Andrew Knewstubb (1/2) 8'; Cards: Sam Dickson (yellow card) 14'

National Stadium
Referee: Jordan Way (Australia)

9 April
13:50 SGT (UTC+8)

Scotland	7–19	New Zealand
Try: Jamie Farndale 1' c Con: Harvey Elms (1/1) 1'; Cards: Paddy Kelly (yellow card) 8'	Report	Try: Caleb Tangitau 4' m Regan Ware 9' c Kitiona Vai 11' c Con: Andrew Knewstubb (2/3) 10', 11'

National Stadium
Referee: Morné Ferreira (South Africa)

9 April
14:12 SGT (UTC+8)

Argentina	24–7	Wales
Try: Felipe del Mestre 5' c Gastón Revol 7' c Luciano González 13' m Franco Sábato 15' m Con: Felipe del Mestre (1/1) 5'; Gastón Revol (1/1) 8'; Francisco Ulloa (0/2); Cards: Joaquín de la Vega (yellow card) 10'	Report	Try: Cole Swannack 9' c Con: Luke Treharne (1/1) 9'

National Stadium
Referee: Tevita Rokovereni (Fiji)

9 April
17:06 SGT (UTC+8)

Wales	5–43	New Zealand
Try: Tom Williams 8' m	Report	Try: Moses Leo (2) 6' c, 9' c Dylan Collier 11' c Kitiona Vai 12' m Leroy Carter 14' c Caleb Tangitau 14' m Akuila Rokolisoa 16' m Con: Akuila Rokolisoa (3) 6', 9', 11'; Andrew Knewstubb 14'

National Stadium
Referee: Craig Chan (Hong Kong)

9 April
17:28 SGT (UTC+8)

Argentina	29–14	Scotland
Try: Franco Sábato 1' m Rodrigo Isgro 3' c Felipe del Mestre 8' c Luciano González 13' m Felipe de la Vega 14' m Con: Gastón Revol (2) 4', 9'	Report	Try: Jamie Farndale 5' c Kaleem Barreto 7' c Con: Harvey Elms 6'; Kaleem Barreto 7'; Cards: Matt Davidson (yellow card)

National Stadium
Referee: Morné Ferreira (South Africa)

=== Pool D ===
Team	Pld	W	D	L	PF	PA	PD	Pts
Fiji	3	2	0	1	100	40	+60	7
Ireland	3	2	0	1	64	31	+33	7
France	3	2	0	1	67	45	+22	7
Japan	3	0	0	3	21	136	–115	3

9 April
10:00 SGT (UTC+8)

France	36–14	Japan
Try: Paulin Riva (3) 2' c, 3' m, 10' c Jordan Sepho (2) 7' m, 9' c Thibaud Mazzoleni 14' m Con: Paulin Riva (1/2) 2'; Stephen Parez (2/3) 9', 10'; William Iraguha (0/1)	Report	Try: Moeki Fukushi 5' c Chikara Morita 12' c Con: Taiga Ishida (2/2) 6', 12'; Cards: Ren Miyagami (yellow card) 15'

National Stadium
Referee: Tevita Rokovereni (Fiji)

9 April
10:22 SGT (UTC+8)

Ireland	21–12	Fiji
Try: Jordan Conroy (2) 6' c, 9' c Terry Kennedy 14' c Con: Billy Dardis (2/2) 6', 9'; Mark Roche (1/1) 15'	Report	Try: Vuiviawa Naduvalo 8' m Joseva Talacolo 9' c Con: Waisea Nacuqu (1/2) 9'

National Stadium
Referee: Nick Hogan (New Zealand)

9 April
13:06 SGT (UTC+8)

France	19–26	Fiji
Try: Joachim Trouabal 1' m Paulin Riva 6' c Rayan Rebbadj 11' c Con: Paulin Riva (1/2) 11'; Stephen Parez (1/1) 6'; Cards: Nisie Huyard (yellow card) 13'	Report	Try: Waisea Nacuqu 4' c Vuiviawa Naduvalo (2) 9' c, 13' c Joseva Talacolo 15' m Con: Waisea Nacuqu (1/1) 4'; Kaminieli Rasaku (1/1) 9'; Iowane Raturaciri (1/2) 14'

National Stadium
Referee: Jordan Way (Australia)

9 April
13:28 SGT (UTC+8)

Ireland	38–7	Japan
Try: Terry Kennedy 1' c Chay Mullins (2) 6' c, 7' m Tamilore Awonusi (2) 12' m, 13' c Jordan Conroy 15'; Con: Hugo Lennox (4/5) 1', 7', 8', 13'; Mark Roche (0/1)	Report	Try: Kazuma Nakagawa 2' c Con: Taiga Ishida (1/1) 3'

National Stadium
Referee: Craig Chan (Hong Kong)

9 April
16:22 SGT (UTC+8)

Japan	0–62	Fiji
	Report	Try: Joseva Talacolo 1' c Vuiviawa Naduvalo (3) 3' m, 5' c, 6' m Josua Vakurunabili 8' c Iowane Raturaciri (2) 9' c, 10' m Kaminieli Rasaku 11' c Pilipo Bukayaro 12' m Josevani Saro 13' c Con: Waisea Nacuqu 2'; Iowane Raturaciri (2) 5', 9'; Kaminieli Rasaku (3) 10', 11', 13'

National Stadium
Referee: Jeremy Rozier (France)

9 April
16:44 SGT (UTC+8)

Ireland	5–12	France
Try: Jordan Conroy 10' m	Report	Try: Jordan Sepho 6' m Jonathan Laugel 7' c Con: Paulin Riva 8'

National Stadium
Referee: Nick Hogan (New Zealand)

== Knockout stage ==
=== 13th–16th playoffs ===
13th place Semi-finals
10 April – National Stadium
England	22
Canada	7
10 April – National Stadium
Scotland	21
Japan	24

13th place Final
10 April – National Stadium
England	28
Japan	14

Matches

Semi-finals

10 April	England	22–7	Canada	National Stadium
14:01 SGT (UTC+8)	Try: Dan Norton (2) 1' m, 4' m Calum Randle 9' c Jamie Barden 16' m Con: Frederick Roddick 9'	Report	Try: D'Shawn Bowen 7' c Con: Brennig Prevost 7'; Cards: Lockie Kratz (yellow card)	Referee: Morné Ferreira (South Africa)

10 April	Scotland	21–24	Japan	National Stadium
14:23 SGT (UTC+8)	Try: Jamie Farndale 2' c Femi Sofolarin 6' c Harvey Elms 12' c Con: Matt Davidson (2) 3', 7'; Harvey Elms 13'	Report	Try: Kameli Raravou Latianara Soejima 4' c Moeki Fukushi (2) 7' m, 13' c Yuki Ishii 9' m Con: Taiga Ishida (2) 4', 14'	Referee: Tevita Rokovereni (Fiji)

13th place Final

10 April	England	28–14	Japan	National Stadium
16:57 SGT (UTC+8)	Try: Will Homer 1' c Frederick Roddick 8' c Joe Browning 9' m Dan Norton 12' c Con: Frederick Roddick (3) 2', 8', 12'; Ed Coulson 12'; Cards: Dan Norton (yellow card)	Report	Try: Yuki Ishii 5' c Sitaleki Taufa Makisi 15' c Con: Hibiki Yamada 6'; Taiga Ishida 16'	Referee: Craig Chan (Hong Kong)

=== 9th–12th playoffs ===
Quarter-finals
10 April – National Stadium
England	19
Wales (a.e.t.)	24
10 April – National Stadium
France	40
Canada	12
10 April – National Stadium
Scotland	10
Spain	27
10 April – National Stadium
Kenya	12
Japan	10

Semi-finals
10 April – National Stadium
Wales	12
France	38
10 April – National Stadium
Spain	19
Kenya	10

9th Place Final
10 April – National Stadium
France	24
Spain	19

Matches

Quarter-finals

10 April	England	19–24 (a.e.t.)	Wales	National Stadium
11:00 SGT (UTC+8)	Try: Will Homer 3' c Blake Boyland (2) 14' c, 15' m Con: Frederick Roddick (2) 3', 14'; Cards: Blake Boyland (yellow card)	Report	Try: Cole Swannack 5' c Lloyd Lewis 10' c Morgan Williams 10' m Callum Williams 17' m Con: Luke Treharne (2) 6', 10'	Referee: Craig Chan (Hong Kong)

10 April	France	40–12	Canada	National Stadium
11:22 SGT (UTC+8)	Try: Jonathan Laugel 2' c Nelson Epee 5' c Thibaud Mazzoleni 7' c William Iraguha 10' c Aaron Grandidier 13' c Rayan Rebbadj 16' m Con: Thibaud Mazzoleni (2) 2', 7'; Rayan Rebbadj 6'; Paulin Riva (2) 10', 13'; Cards: Aaron Grandidier (yellow card)	Report	Try: Phil Berna (2) 8' c, 10' m Con: Brennig Prevost 8'	Referee: Jordan Way (Australia)

10 April	Scotland	10–27	Spain	National Stadium
11:44 SGT (UTC+8)	Try: Jordan Edmonds (2) 3' m, 13' m	Report	Try: Javier de Juan 2' c Tobias Sainz-Trapaga 8' m Pol Pla 10' m Nicolás Nieto 10' m Jerry Surumi Davoibaravi 14' m Con: Juan Ramos 2'	Referee: Jeremy Rozier (France)

10 April	Kenya	12–10	Japan	National Stadium
12:06 SGT (UTC+8)	Try: Herman Humwa 4' c Billy Odhiambo 6' m Con: Anthony Omondi 4'	Report	Try: Taiga Ishida 2' m Moeki Fukushi 16' m	Referee: Reuben Keane (Australia)

Semi-finals

10 April	Wales	12–38	France	National Stadium
14:45 SGT (UTC+8)	Try: Morgan Sieniawski 11' c Iwan Pyrs Jones 15' m Con: Arthur Lennon 12'	Report	Try: Nelson Epee (3) 2' c, 8' c, 8' m William Iraguha 3' c Jonathan Laugel 9' m Nisie Huyard 12' c Con: Thibaud Mazzoleni (2) 2', 4'; Paulin Riva (2) 8', 13'	Referee: Craig Chan (Hong Kong)

10 April	Spain	19–10	Kenya	National Stadium
15:07 SGT (UTC+8)	Try: Eduardo López 2' c Pol Pla 3' c Javier de Juan 6' m Con: Juan Martínez (2) 2', 4'; Cards: Juan Ramos (yellow card)	Report	Try: Kevin Wekesa 10' m Billy Odhiambo 15' m	Referee: Nick Hogan (New Zealand)

9th place Final

10 April	France	24–19	Spain	National Stadium
18:07 SGT (UTC+8)	Try: Paulin Riva 1' c William Iraguha 2' m Aaron Grandidier 6' c Nisie Huyard 8' m Con: Paulin Riva (2) 1', 7'	Report	Try: Nicolás Nieto 5' c Tobias Sainz-Trapaga 8' c Jerry Surumi Davoibaravi 11' m Con: Juan Martínez (2) 5', 8'	Referee: Reuben Keane (Australia)

=== 5th–8th playoffs ===
5th place Semi-finals
10 April – National Stadium
Argentina	22
South Africa	15
10 April – National Stadium
Samoa	17
United States	24

5th place Final
10 April – National Stadium
Argentina	42
United States	24

Matches

Semi-finals

10 April	Argentina	22–15	South Africa	National Stadium
15:29 SGT (UTC+8)	Try: Gastón Revol 2' c Agustín Fraga (2) 6' m, 11' m Marcos Moneta 14' m Con: Tobiás Wade 3'	Report	Try: JC Pretorius 7' m Selvyn Davids 9' m Impi Visser 15' m Cards: Selvyn Davids (yellow card); Ryan Oosthuizen (yellow card)	Referee: Reuben Keane (Australia)

10 April	Samoa	17–24	United States	National Stadium
15:51 SGT (UTC+8)	Try: Owen Fetu 6' c Melani Matavao 8' m Vaa Apelu Maliko 9' m Con: Iafeta Purcell 6'	Report	Try: Kevon Williams (2) 2' c, 11' m Ben Broselle 13' m Lucas Lacamp 14' c Con: Lucas Lacamp 3'; Marcus Tupuola 14'	Referee: Morné Ferreira (South Africa)

5th place Final

10 April	Argentina	42–24	United States	National Stadium
18:31 SGT (UTC+8)	Try: Felipe del Mestre 2' c Luciano González 4' c Agustín Fraga 8' c Tobiás Wade 9' c Germán Schulz 9' m Marcos Moneta 11' c Con: Tobiás Wade (2) 3', 4'; Santiago Vera Feld 9'; Felipe del Mestre (3) 8', 10', 12'	Report	Try: Ben Broselle 7' m Dmontae Noble (2) 10' c, 13' m Gavan D'Amore 15' c Con: Marcus Tupuola 11'; Gavan D'Amore 15'	Referee: Morné Ferreira (South Africa)

=== Cup playoffs ===
Quarter-finals
10 April – National Stadium
Australia	29
Argentina	5
10 April – National Stadium
Fiji	19
South Africa	14
10 April – National Stadium
New Zealand	22
Samoa	14
10 April – National Stadium
United States	12
Ireland	14

Semi-finals
10 April – National Stadium
Australia	12
Fiji	19
10 April – National Stadium
New Zealand	22
Ireland	19

Cup Final
10 April – National Stadium
Fiji	28
New Zealand	17
Third place
10 April – National Stadium
Australia	21
Ireland	19

Matches

Quarter-finals

10 April	Australia	29–5	Argentina	National Stadium
12:28 SGT (UTC+8)	Try: Corey Toole (3) 1' c, 5' c, 8' m Matthew Gonzalez 12' c Con: Dietrich Roache (3) 2', 6', 12'	Report	Try: Agustín Fraga 15' m	Referee: Morné Ferreira (South Africa)

10 April	Fiji	19–14	South Africa	National Stadium
12:50 SGT (UTC+8)	Try: Vuiviawa Naduvalo 3' c Joseva Talacolo 4' m Waisea Nacuqu 8' c Con: Waisea Nacuqu (2) 3', 9'	Report	Try: Zain Davids 6' c Siviwe Soyizwapi 12' c Con: Ronald Brown (2) 6', 13'	Referee: Nick Hogan (New Zealand)

10 April	New Zealand	22–14	Samoa	National Stadium
13:12 SGT (UTC+8)	Try: Moses Leo 1' c Brady Rush 10' m Caleb Tangitau 14' m Kitiona Vai 15' m Con: Andrew Knewstubb 2'; Cards: Sam Dickson	Report	Try: Steve Rimoni (2) 4' c, 10' c Con: Melani Matavao 5'; Iafeta Purcell 11' c Cards: Paul Scanlan (yellow card) 8' (yellow-red card) 16'	Referee: Tevita Rokovereni (Fiji)

10 April	United States	12–14	Ireland	National Stadium
13:34 SGT (UTC+8)	Try: Lucas Lacamp 6' c Perry Baker 9' m Con: Folau Niua 6'; Cards: Maceo Brown (yellow card)	Report	Try: Hugo Lennox 2' c Jordan Conroy 10' c Con: Hugo Lennox 3'; Billy Dardis 11'	Referee: Reuben Keane (Australia)

Semi-finals

10 April	Australia	12–19	Fiji	National Stadium
16:13 SGT (UTC+8)	Try: Nick Malouf 4' m Henry Hutchison 7' c Con: Dietrich Roache 8'; Cards: Dietrich Roache (yellow card)	Report	Try: Joseva Talacolo 2' c Vuiviawa Naduvalo 8' m Elia Canakaivata 13' m Con: Kaminieli Rasaku 3'; Waisea Nacuqu 13'	Referee: Jeremy Rozier (France)

10 April	New Zealand	22–19	Ireland	National Stadium
16:35 SGT (UTC+8)	Try: Regan Ware 5' m Dylan Collier 8' c Trael Joass 14' m Akuila Rokolisoa 16' m Con: Andrew Knewstubb 9'	Report	Try: Jordan Conroy 1' c Terry Kennedy 10' m Gavin Mullin 13' c Con: Billy Dardis 2'; Mark Roche 13'	Referee: Jordan Way (Australia)

Third place

10 April	Australia	21–19	Ireland	National Stadium
18:58 SGT (UTC+8)	Try: Corey Toole 2' c Ben Marr 4' c Dietrich Roache 10' c Con: Dietrich Roache (3) 3', 5', 11'; Cards: Nick Malouf (yellow card)	Report	Try: Hugo Lennox 7' c Gavin Mullin 8' c Andrew Smith 14' m Con: Mark Roche (2) 7', 9'	Referee: Nick Hogan (New Zealand)

Cup Final

10 April	Fiji	28–17	New Zealand	National Stadium
19:28 SGT (UTC+8)	Try: Vuiviawa Naduvalo (2) 2', c, 11' c Waisea Nacuqu 5' c Joseva Talacolo 8' c Con: Kaminieli Rasaku (3) 3', 8', 11'; Waisea Nacuqu 5'	Report	Try: Regan Ware 9' m Moses Leo 13' c Caleb Tangitau 14' m Con: Akuila Rokolisoa 13'; Cards: Leroy Carter (yellow card)	Referee: Jeremy Rozier (France)

=== Placings ===
Place	Team	Points
1st place, gold medalist(s)	Fiji	22
2nd place, silver medalist(s)	New Zealand	19
3rd place, bronze medalist(s)	Australia	17
4	Ireland	15
5	Argentina	13
6	United States	12
7	South Africa	10
7	Samoa	10

Place	Team	Points
9	France	8
10	Spain	7
11	Kenya	5
11	Wales	5
13	England	3
14	Japan	2
15	Canada	1
15	Scotland	1

== See also ==
- 2022 Canada Women's Sevens

== Notes ==
Sevens Series XXIII
Preceded by 2022 Seville Sevens	2022 Singapore Sevens	Succeeded by 2022 Vancouver Sevens
Singapore Sevens
Preceded by 2019 Singapore Sevens	2022 Singapore Sevens	Succeeded by 2023 Singapore Sevens
