= Corey Toole =

Australian rugby union player

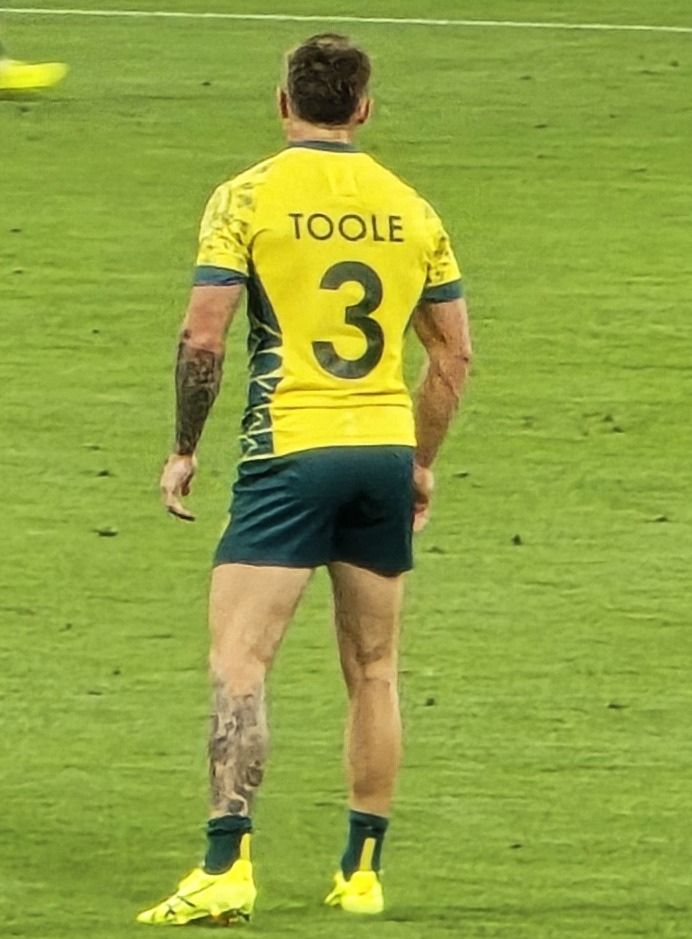
- Toole representing Australia sevens at the 2024 Summer Olympics
- Born: 7 March 2000 (age 26) Forbes, New South Wales, Australia
- Height: 1.78 m (5 ft 10 in)
- Weight: 85 kg (187 lb)
- School: Mater Dei Catholic College

Rugby union career
- Position: Wing
- Current team: ACT Brumbies
Senior career
| Years | Team | Apps | (Points) |
| 2023– | ACT Brumbies | 56 | (170) |
- Correct as of 5 June 2026
International career
| Years | Team | Apps | (Points) |
| 2021–2024 | Australia sevens | 58 | (240) |
| 2023–2024 | Australia A | 3 | (5) |
| 2025– | Australia | 6 | (5) |
- Correct as of 23 August 2025

Corey Toole (born 7 March 2000) is an Australian professional rugby union player who plays as a wing for Super Rugby club ACT Brumbies and the Australia national team.

== Club career ==
=== ACT Brumbies ===
In September 2022, the ACT Brumbies announced that Corey Toole had signed a two-year contract with the club. He joined former rugby sevens players Ben O'Donnell and Jack Debreczeni in signing ahead of the 2023 Super Rugby Pacific season. Toole scored two tries on debut in the Brumbies' opening-round victory over the New South Wales Waratahs. He produced further notable performances, including a 77th-minute try that secured a come-from-behind victory over the Waratahs and extended the Brumbies' winning streak against them to eleven matches.

Following the 2024 season, the ACT Brumbies announced that Toole had signed a one-year contract extension, having scored seventeen tries in twenty-seven appearances since his debut. He later signed an additional contract extension with the club, keeping him until the end of 2026.

== International career ==
=== Australia sevens ===
Toole made his sevens debut at the first event of the 2021–22 World Rugby Sevens Series, scoring four tries including two in the Fifth place final victory against Great Britain (35–21). Since debuting for Australia at the first event in Dubai, Toole has become one of the most important players for them, racking up the most tries in the series (27) and three impact player awards (Málaga, Seville, Singapore). Following the fifth sevens event (10 April 2022), Toole held the most "Total Impact" points with 292, thirty-three points above second place Terry Kennedy (Ireland). Going into the final event of the 2021–22 series (Los Angeles), Toole remains the highest "Total Impact" points holder with 430, just fourteen points ahead of Terry Kennedy.

In March 2022 Rugby Australia (RA) announced that Toole had signed to stay with the Men's Australia sevens team until the end of the 2022 Rugby World Cup Sevens, which would see him play in both the Sevens World Cup and the 2022 Commonwealth Games, and would see him play full-time with the ACT Brumbies from 2023 Super Rugby Pacific season onwards.

At the 2022 Commonwealth Games, Toole helped Australia to a fourth-place finish, one placing better than the previous tournament (2018). Toole scored two tries throughout the tournament. He competed for Australia at the 2022 Rugby World Cup Sevens in Cape Town.

He was named in the Australian sevens team for the 2024 Summer Olympics in Paris.

=== Australia ===
Toole played for the Australia A team against Tonga on 14 July 2023 in the 2023 Rugby World Cup warm-ups, scoring one try. Australia A lost 27–21 in Nukuʻalofa. Toole made another appearance for the Australia A team in 2024, on Australia's Grand Slam tour, against England A.

Toole was named in the Australia squad ahead of their second test against South Africa in the 2025 Rugby Championship. Toole scored Australia's first try of the match in the seventh minute; however, Australia lost 30–22 in Cape Town.

== Career statistics ==
=== Rugby sevens ===
As of 14 May 2023

Sevens Series statistics
| Season | Comps | Apps | Tries | Con. | Pen. | DG | Yel. | Red | Points |
|---|---|---|---|---|---|---|---|---|---|
| 2021–22 | 9 | 46 | 43 | 0 | 0 | 0 | 0 | 0 | 215 |

=== Super Rugby ===
Super Rugby statistics
| Team | Comp. | Season | Matches | | | | | Disc. | | Tries | Points | Try ratio |
| Team | Comp. | Season | P | W | D | L | % | (yellow card) Yel. | (red card) Red | Tries | Points | Try ratio |
|---|---|---|---|---|---|---|---|---|---|---|---|---|
| ACT Brumbies | Super Rugby | 2023 | 14 | 9 | 0 | 5 | 64 | 0 | 0 | 9 | 45 | .64 |
| ACT Brumbies | Super Rugby | 2024 | 13 | 10 | 0 | 3 | 77 | 0 | 0 | 8 | 40 | .62 |
| ACT Brumbies | Super Rugby | 2025 | 16 | 10 | 0 | 6 | 63 | 1 | 0 | 11 | 55 | .69 |
| ACT Brumbies | Super Rugby | 2026 | TBD | | | | | | | | | |
| Super Rugby Total | | | 43 | 29 | 0 | 14 | 67 | 1 | 0 | 28 | 140 | .65 |
| Team | Comp. | Season | P | W | D | L | % | (yellow card) Yel. | (red card) Red | Tries | Points | Try ratio |
| Team | Comp. | Season | Matches | | | | | Disc. | | Tries | Points | Try ratio |

== Honours ==
Australia

- 1× World Rugby Sevens Series: 2021–22

Individual

- 3× World Rugby Sevens Series Impact Player: 2021–22 legs: Málaga, Seville, Singapore
