= Jérôme Daret =

French rugby union player and coach

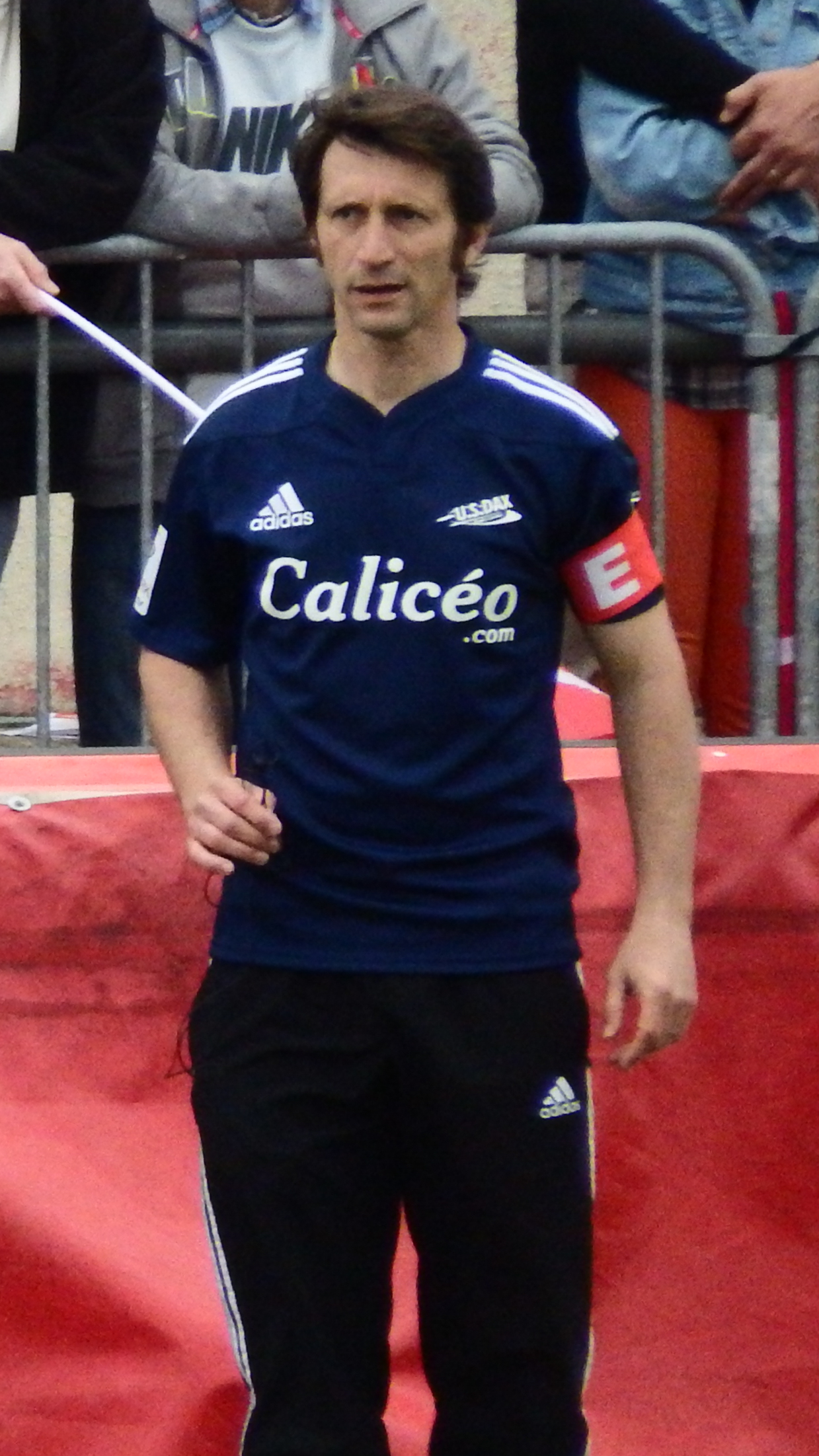
- Born: 26 December 1974 (age 51) Dax, Landes, France
- Height: 1.78 m (5 ft 10 in)

Rugby union career
- Position: Scrum-half
Senior career
Years	Team	Apps	(Points)
1994–2006	US Dax		
National sevens team
Years	Team		Comps
- France 7s
Coaching career
- Years: Team
- 2007–2008: US Dax
- 2013–2014: US Dax
- 2015: US Dax
- 2017–: France 7s
Medal record
Men's rugby sevens
Representing France
Olympic Games
Gold medal – first place	2024 Paris	Team competition

Jérôme Daret (born 26 December 1974) is a French rugby union coach and former player who played as a scrum-half. He spent his entire professional playing career with the US Dax and at the same time had several international selections in rugby sevens. He then transitioned to a career as a coach, with US Dax, then the French rugby sevens team.

== Playing career ==
Originally from Bias and trained at UA Mimizan, Daret spent his entire professional career with the US Dax as a scrum-half from 1994 to 2006.

=== International career ===
In the meantime, Daret wore the national jersey of the French rugby sevens team, discovering the discipline when he was called up to compensate for a player's injury, and he took part in the Hong Kong Sevens tournament for his debut.

== Coaching career ==
=== US Dax ===
At the end of his playing career, Daret joined the staff of US Dax and pursued a coaching career, becoming director of the training center. He also held the position of head coach of the flagship team on several occasions. At the start of the 2007–2008 season, he joined the staff of the USD then promoted to the Top 14, to replace Marc Lièvremont, a former coach French rugby union team. Daret was again called in as reinforcement during the 2012–2013 season, following the sidelining of Christophe Manas and Frédéric Garcia. He was reappointed as the regular coach the following year, supported by the arrival of manager Richard Dourthe. He stepped down in the 2014–2015 season, taking over the management of the training center full-time, while maintaining a role as an occasional contributor to the first team. Despite his new official role as consultant, he remained very involved in practice with the professional team. In March 2015, before the 22nd day of the championship, Richard Dourthe was thanked by the club authorities. Following his departure, the club had to finish the season with a staff reduced to two elements, Brice Miguel in the forwards and Jérôme Daret for the back lines, who saw his workload increase even more despite his official position as internal consultant. For the 2015–2016 season, Daret was promoted to the position of sporting director by the future director Jean-Christophe Goussebaire before the end of the previous season.

On 23 November 2015, Daret has been a member of the steering committee of TECH XV, the union of French professional rugby coaches and educators. He has been the union's secretary general since 10 October 2016.

=== France 7s ===
On 29 May 2017, Daret was appointed coach of the French rugby sevens team by the French Rugby Federation, replacing Frédéric Pomarel, at the request of Christophe Reigt.

On 3 March 2024, Daret led the team to its second victory in its history in a SVNS tournament by winning the Los USA Sevens. This tournament, and the one preceding it in Canada, were widely followed in France thanks to the participation of Antoine Dupont, captain of the French XV team, who joined the team to prepare for the 2024 Summer Olympics in Paris. The French team subsequently won the final tournament in Madrid, which marked the coronation of SVNS champion, the first in the history of Les Bleus.

== Honours ==
World Rugby Sevens Series

- France Sevens
  - Third-place: 2022
- Dubai Sevens
  - Cup (fifth place): 2022
- Canada Sevens
  - Runners-up: 2019
  - Third-place: 2024
- Hong Kong Sevens
  - Runners-up: 2019, 2024
  - Third-place: 2022
- USA Sevens
  - Winners: 2024
- Spain Sevens
  - Series Champions: 2024
