= Lucas Lacamp =

US international rugby union player

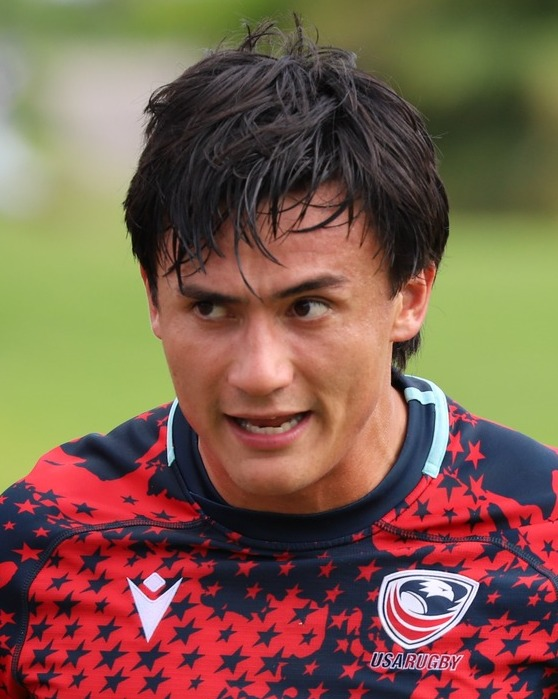
- Full name: Lucas Philippe Lacamp
- Born: June 4, 2001 (age 25) Hong Kong
- Height: 6 ft 0 in (1.82 m)
- Weight: 190 lb (86 kg; 13 st 8 lb)
- University: University of California, Los Angeles

Rugby union career
- Position(s): Centre, Fullback
Senior career
Years	Team	Apps	(Points)
2025–	Kolkata Banga Tigers		
International career
Years	Team	Apps	(Points)
2019	Hong Kong U20	3	(0)
- Correct as of December 1, 2023
National sevens team
Years	Team		Comps
2021–	United States		15
- Correct as of December 1, 2023

Lucas Philippe Lacamp (/ləˈkæmp/ lə-KAMP; born June 4, 2001) is a professional rugby union player who plays as a centre. Born in Hong Kong, he represents United States at international level after qualifying on residency grounds.

== Early life ==
Lacamp lived in Hong Kong and England in his youth, where he learned to play rugby. Lucas was educated at The King's School, Canterbury (GR 2014–2019). He represented Hong Kong at the 2019 World Rugby under-20 tournament. Lacamp in 2019 also played for the USA High School All-Americans team. He attended university in the United States, playing rugby with the UCLA Bruins. He was a finalist for the Rudy Scholz award as the best men's collegiate rugby player.

== International career ==
Lacamp debuted for the U.S. on the 2021–22 World Rugby Sevens Series at the December 2021 Dubai Sevens. Lacamp was recognized for his performance at the May 2022 France Sevens, where he was nominated as one of the impact players of the tournament and described as a rising star.

Lacamp represented the United States at the 2022 Rugby World Cup Sevens in Cape Town. He scored a hat trick against Uganda and tally seven tries before being sidelined due to injury.

He represented the United States at the 2024 Summer Olympics in Paris.
