= 2022 Spain Sevens =

World Rugby Sevens Series tournaments

- Sevens World Series XXIII
- Host nation: Spain

Málaga
- Date: 21–23 January 2022
- Champion: South Africa
- Runner-up: Argentina
- Third: England

Tournament details
- Matches played: 40
- Tries scored: 241 (average 6.03 per match)

Seville
- Date: 28–30 January 2022
- Champion: South Africa
- Runner-up: Australia
- Third: Argentina

Tournament details
- Matches played: 40
- Tries scored: 229 (average 5.73 per match)

The 2022 Spain Sevens was held as two rugby sevens tournaments on consecutive weekends in January that year. The first was hosted at Estadio Ciudad in Málaga and the second at Estadio La Cartuja in Seville. These events were the inaugural season of the Spain Sevens and were played as the third and fourth tournaments of the 2021–22 World Rugby Sevens Series.

South Africa won back-to-back titles in Spain, defeating Argentina in the final at Málaga and Australia in the final at Seville.

== Format ==
The teams at each tournament were drawn into four pools. A round-robin was held for each pool, where each team played the others in their pool once. The top two teams from each pool advanced to the Cup quarterfinals to compete for tournament honours. The other teams from each pool went to the lower classification playoffs.

== Teams ==
The fifteen national men's teams competing in Spain were:

- Argentina
- Australia
- Canada
- England
- France
- Germany
- Ireland
- Jamaica
- Japan
- Kenya
- Scotland
- South Africa
- Spain
- United States
- Wales

Due to impacts of the COVID-19 pandemic, several core teams originally scheduled to play had to be replaced in the draw before the competition began.

- New Zealand was eligible to play in Málaga and Seville but withdrew due to the challenges of COVID-19 travel logistics. Germany replaced them for both tournaments.
- Fiji and Samoa withdrew from both events in Spain following positive COVID-19 tests in their respective squads. Jamaica replaced Samoa in Málaga and then replaced Fiji in Seville.

Fiji and Samoa were not replaced in the schedules for Málaga and Seville, respectively. Their opponents advanced by walkover in those tournaments. As such, Fiji finished equal-last in Málaga and received one point toward their season standings. Samoa finished equal-last in Seville and received one point toward their season standings.

== Pool stage – Málaga ==
The first tournament was held at Estadio Ciudad in Málaga on 21–23 January 2022. South Africa won the event, defeating Argentina in the final by 24–17.

All times in Central European Time (GMT+01:00). The pools were scheduled as follows:

Key: Team advanced to the quarterfinals

=== Pool A – Málaga ===
Fiji was included in the draw but did not compete in the tournament so there were only three teams in Pool A. Fiji's matches were scored as 0–0 byes and their opponents gained 3 points in the pool standings for each bye.

Team	W	D	L	PF	PA	PD	Pts
South Africa	2	0	0	70	7	+63	9
England	1	0	1	24	60	−36	7
Scotland	0	0	2	24	51	−27	5
~~Fiji~~	0	0	0	0	0	0	0

21 January 2022	South Africa	27–7	Scotland	Estadio Ciudad de Málaga
13:12	Try: Z. Davids 8'; S. Davids 9' 11'; Soyizwapi 13', Grobbelaar 15'; Con: Du Preez 11'; Cards: JC Pretorius	Report	Try: Kelly 4'; Con: Lowe 4'	Referee: Jeremy Rozier

21 January 2022	England	24–17	Scotland	Estadio Ciudad de Málaga
17:34	Try: Adamson 9'; Davis 8' 15'; Boyland 11'; Con: Roddick 8' 12'	Report	Try: Edmonds 4'; Farndale 8'; McCann 13'; Con: Lowe 7'; Cards: Barreto (YC)	Referee: Francisco Gonzalez

22 January 2022	South Africa	43–0	England	Estadio Ciudad de Málaga
13:17	Try: Du Preez 1'; Visser 3', Ndhlovu 7'; Z. Davids 8', S. Davids 8'; Geduld 12', Adonis 15'; Con: Du Preez 4' 7' 9' 9'	Report	Cards: Bowen (YC)	Referee: Ben Breakspear

=== Pool B – Málaga ===
Team	W	D	L	PF	PA	PD	Pts
Ireland	3	0	0	67	26	+41	9
Australia	1	1	1	59	22	+37	6
Germany	1	1	1	48	36	+12	6
Japan	0	0	3	14	104	−90	3

21 January 2022	Ireland	33–14	Japan	Estadio Ciudad de Málaga
12:06	Try: Mollen 4'; Roche 5', Kennedy 9' 14'; Comerford 12'; Con: Kearns 5' 6', Roche 13' 15'	Report	Try: Ishida 3'; Nakagawa 7'; Con: Ishida 3' 8'	Referee: Paulo Duarte

21 January 2022	Australia	12–12	Germany	Estadio Ciudad de Málaga
12:28	Try: Lawson 9' 12'; Con: Roache 9'	Report	Try: Hunt 10'; Lichtenberg 15'; Con: Heimpel 15'; Cards: Dawe (YC)	Referee: Ben Breakspear

21 January 2022	Ireland	24–7	Germany	Estadio Ciudad de Málaga
16:50	Try: Smith 3'; Kennedy 9', Kelly 12'; Cribbin 14'; Con: Roche 3' 15; Cards: Phillips (YC)	Report	Try: Heimpel 8'; Con: Heimpel 8'	Referee: Adam Leal

21 January 2022	Australia	42–0	Japan	Estadio Ciudad de Málaga
17:12	Try: Toole 1' 7'; Turner 4', Roache 4'; Longbottom 8', Lawson 10'; Con: Roache 1' 4' 4' 7' 9' 11'	Report		Referee: Finlay Brown

22 January 2022	Japan	0–29	Germany	Estadio Ciudad de Málaga
12:11		Report	Try: Lichtenberg 10' 8'; Merz 10', Szczesny 13'; Hunt 15'; Con: Heimpel 10'; Van der Bosch 14'	Referee: Finlay Brown

22 January 2022	Australia	5–10	Ireland	Estadio Ciudad de Málaga
12:33	Try: Longbottom 8'; Cards: Cribbin (YC)	Report	Try: Roche 1'; Ward 14'	Referee: Jeremy Rozier

=== Pool C – Málaga ===
Team	W	D	L	PF	PA	PD	Pts
United States	3	0	0	90	31	+59	9
Argentina	2	0	1	88	43	+45	7
Spain	1	0	2	64	66	−2	5
Jamaica	0	0	3	14	116	−102	3

21 January 2022	United States	19–14	Spain	Estadio Ciudad de Málaga
13:34	Try: Tomasin 1'; Baker 3', Isles 6'; Con: Tomasin 3' 7'	Report	Try: Serres 4', Pla 13'; Con: Martinez 4'; Ramos 13'	Referee: Adam Leal

21 January 2022	Argentina	31–7	Jamaica	Estadio Ciudad de Málaga
13:56	Try: Sabato 5' 9'; Schulz 8', Moneta 10'; Velez 14'; Con: Feld 8' 11'; Del Mestre 14'	Report	Try: Dixon 1'; Con: Roy-Smith 1'	Referee: Ben Breakspear

21 January 2022	United States	47–0	Jamaica	Estadio Ciudad de Málaga
19:05	Try: Williams 5' 6' 8'; Schroeder 7', Brown 10'; Tomasin 11', Still 14'; Con: Talapusi 5' 6' 7'; Tomasin 8' 12' 15'	Report		Referee: Jeremy Rozier

21 January 2022	Argentina	40–12	Spain	Estadio Ciudad de Málaga
20:03	Try: Isgro 4'; Elizalde 5', Gonzalez 8'; Moneta 15' 18', Fraga 22'; Con: Del Mestre 6' 9' 15' 18'; Lamas 23'	Report	Try: Romero 19'; Soriano 21'; Con: Romero 19'	Referee: Francisco Gonzalez

22 January 2022	Spain	38–7	Jamaica	Estadio Ciudad de Málaga
13:39	Try: Pla 2'; Martinez 5' 9', Nieto 7'; Bolinches 12', Ramos 14'; Con: Martinez 2' 5' 7' 9'	Report	Try: Bush 11'; Con: Stoppani 11'	Referee: Francisco Gonzalez

22 January 2022	Argentina	17–24	United States	Estadio Ciudad de Málaga
14:01	Try: Isgro 7'; Elizalde 9', Fraga 10'; Con: Del Mestre 9'	Report	Try: Williams 2' 4'; Baker 9', Still 12'; Con: Tomasin 3' 5'	Referee: Paulo Duarte

=== Pool D – Málaga ===
Team	W	D	L	PF	PA	PD	Pts
France	2	0	1	91	41	+50	7
Canada	2	0	1	50	62	−12	7
Wales	1	0	2	36	78	−42	5
Kenya	1	0	2	57	53	+4	5

21 January 2022	Kenya	17–19	Canada	Estadio Ciudad de Málaga
11:22	Try: Onyala 2' 9'; Oyoo 12'; Con: Amunga 12'; Cards: Oyoo (YC)	Report	Try: Coats 4'; Morra 6', Russell 9'; Con: Coats 5' 9'	Referee: Finlay Brown

21 January 2022	France	38–10	Wales	Estadio Ciudad de Málaga
11:44	Try: Epee 2' 8'; Sepho 6' 8' 13', Laugel 10'; Con: Riva 2' 7' 8' 14'	Report	Try: T. Williams 4'; Lewis 5'; Cards: T. Williams (YC)	Referee: Adam Leal

21 January 2022	Kenya	14–19	Wales	Estadio Ciudad de Málaga
16:06	Try: Onyala 4'; Oluoch 11'; Con: Amunga 4', Taabu 12'	Report	Try: M. Williams 9' 10'; Brown 13'; Con: Treharne 9' 10'	Referee: Francisco Gonzalez

21 January 2022	France	38–5	Canada	Estadio Ciudad de Málaga
16:28	Try: Sepho 2' 8'; Huyard 3', Epee 5' 11'; Pasquet 13'; Con: Parez 4' 9', Riva 11'; Iraguha 14'; Cards: Mignot	Report	Try: Berna 8'	Referee: Paulo Duarte

22 January 2022	Canada	26–7	Wales	Estadio Ciudad de Málaga
11:27	Try: Coats 2'; Sauder 8', Ergas 11'; Morra 13'; Con: Coats 2' 8' 11'	Report	Try: Jenkins 5'; Con: Treharne 5'; Cards: Treharne (YC)	Referee: Paulo Duarte

22 January 2022	France	15–26	Kenya	Estadio Ciudad de Málaga
11:49	Try: Grandidier 3' 5'; Trouabal 7'; Cards: Mignot	Report	Try: Onyala 9' 14'; Oyoo 10', Ashihundu 12'; Con: Taabu 9' 13' 14'	Referee: Adam Leal

== Knockout stage – Málaga ==
=== 13th-place playoffs – Málaga ===
Jamaica had a bye through to the 13th-place final due to Fiji's withdrawal from the tournament.

13th-place semifinals
23 Jan 2022 – 12:19
Kenya	17
Japan	26

13th-place final
23 Jan 2022 – 16:07
Jamaica	24
Japan (a.e.t.)	29

Matches

13th-place semifinals

23 January 2022	Kenya	17–26	Japan	Estadio Ciudad de Málaga
12:19	Try: Amunga 2' 9'; Olindi 15'; Con: Omondi 15'	Report	Try: Nakagawa 4' 5'; Tomonaga 10', Tsuoka 12'; Con: Ishida 5' 6', Kano 11'	Referee: Eki Fanlo

13th-place final

23 January 2022	Jamaica	24–29 (a.e.t.)	Japan	Estadio Ciudad de Málaga
16:07	Try: Stoppani 2' 7' 12'; Chris Mcintosh 9'; Con: Adamson 2'; Roy-Smith 7'; Cards: Clayton (YC) 9'	Report	Try: Miyagami 5'; Ishida 9'; Tsuoka 13' 16'; Makisi 15'; Con: Kano 5', Ishida 14' 16'; Cards: Makisi (YC) 11'	Referee: Francisco Gonzalez

=== 9th-place playoffs – Málaga ===
Wales had a bye through to the 9th-place semifinals due to Fiji's withdrawal from the tournament.

9th-place quarterfinals
22 Jan 2022 – 17:20
Scotland	17
Kenya	12
22 Jan 2022 – 17:42
Spain	31
Japan	10
22 Jan 2022 – 18:04
Germany	48
Jamaica	0

9th-place semifinals
23 Jan 2022 – 12:41
Scotland	10
Spain	24
23 Jan 2022 – 13:03
Germany	19
Wales	27

9th-place final
23 Jan 2022 – 16:29
Spain	34
Wales	5

Matches

9th-place quarterfinals

22 January 2022	Scotland	17–12	Kenya	Estadio Ciudad de Málaga
17:20	Try: Farndale 8'; Elms 11', Kelly 14'; Con: Lowe 11'	Report	Try: Oluoch 4'; Onyala 9'; Con: Olindi 4'	Referee: Ben Breakspear

22 January 2022	Spain	31–10	Japan	Estadio Ciudad de Málaga
17:42	Try: Moreno 3'; Martinez 7', Pla 8'; Lopez 8', De Juan 11'; Con: Martinez 7' 8'; Ramos 11'	Report	Try: Tsuoka 13'; Ishida 15'	Referee: Paulo Duarte

22 January 2022	Germany	48–0	Jamaica	Estadio Ciudad de Málaga
18:04	Try: Hunt 1' 11'; Plümpe 3', Umeh 5'; Merz 8', Szczesny 8'; Hufnagel 12', Hees 15'; Con: Heimpel 3' 6' 13' 15'	Report		Referee: Jeremy Rozier

9th-place semifinals

23 January 2022	Scotland	10–24	Spain	Estadio Ciudad de Málaga
12:41	Try: Farndale 2'; Callaghan 14'; Cards: McCann (YC) 10'	Report	Try: Sainz-Trapaga 4' 11'; De Juan 8', Lopez 9'; Con: Ramos 4' 8'	Referee: Adam Leal

23 January 2022	Germany	19–27	Wales	Estadio Ciudad de Málaga
13:03	Try: Heimpel 5'; Merz 7'; Hunt 9'; Con: Heimpel 7' 10'	Report	Try: Swannack 3'; Jenkins 10', Lewis 8'; Lennon 12' Evans 14'; Con: Treharne 3'	Referee: Francisco Gonzalez

9th-place final

23 January 2022	Spain	34–5	Wales	Estadio Ciudad de Málaga
16:29	Try: Pla 2'; Sainz-Trapaga 6', Moreno 9'; Lopez 9', Soriano 13'; Bolinches 14'; Con: Ramos 9', Martinez 15'	Report	Try: Treharne 5'; Cards: Lennon (YC)	Referee: Finlay Brown

=== 5th-place playoffs – Málaga ===
5th-place semifinals
23 Jan 2022 – 13:25
Canada	7
United States	19
23 Jan 2022 – 13:47
France	15
Ireland	10

5th-place final
23 Jan 2022 – 16:51
United States	12
France	28

Matches

5th-place semifinals

23 January 2022	Canada	7–19	United States	Estadio Ciudad de Málaga
13:25	Try: Coats 7'; Con: Coats 8'; Cards: Coats (YC) 1'	Report	Try: Brown 2'; Isles 5', Still 12'; Con: Tomasin 5' 12'	Referee: Ben Breakspear

23 January 2022	France	20–10	Ireland	Estadio Ciudad de Málaga
13:47	Try: Sepho 5'; Pasquet 9', Trouabal 11'; Grandidier 14'	Report	Try: Kennedy 8' 10'; Cards: Phillips (YC) 2'	Referee: Finlay Brown

5th-place final

23 January 2022	United States	12–28	France	Estadio Ciudad de Málaga
16:51	Try: Tago 4'; Williams 7'; Con: Tomasin 7'	Report	Try: Riva 2'; Iraguha 5', Trouabal 10'; Grandidier 14'; Con: Riva 2', Iraguha 6' 10' 14'	Referee: Paulo Duarte

=== Cup playoffs – Málaga ===
Quarterfinals
22 Jan 2022 – 19:07
South Africa	14
Canada	0
22 Jan 2022 – 19:35
United States	7
Australia	26
22 Jan 2022 – 20:05
France	5
England	12
22 Jan 2022 – 20:33
Ireland	5
Argentina	29

Semifinals
23 Jan 2022 – 14:09
South Africa	19
Australia	0
23 Jan 2022 – 14:31
England	17
Argentina	26

Final
23 Jan 2022 – 18:56
South Africa	24
Argentina	17
3rd-place final
23 Jan 2022 – 17:59
Australia	20
England	24

Matches

Quarterfinals

22 January 2022	South Africa	14–0	Canada	Estadio Ciudad de Málaga
19:07	Try: Oosthuizen 11'; Geduld 14'; Con: Du Preez 11'; Human 15'	Report		Referee: Francisco Gonzalez

22 January 2022	United States	7–26	Australia	Estadio Ciudad de Málaga
19:35	Try: Baker 7'; Con: Tomasin 8'	Report	Try: Toole 4'; Turner 9', Roache 11'; Longbottom 13'; Con: Longbottom 4' 10' 13'	Referee: Adam Leal

22 January 2022	France	5–12	England	Estadio Ciudad de Málaga
20:05	Try: Trouabal 6'; Cards: Riva (YC)	Report	Try: Hyde 5', Boyland 8'; Con: Roddick 8'	Referee: Finlay Brown

22 January 2022	Ireland	5–29	Argentina	Estadio Ciudad de Málaga
20:33	Try: Phillips 9'	Report	Try: Moneta 2' 7'; Gonzalez 9' 14', Schulz 11'; Con: Del Mestre 9'; Lamas 14'	Referee: Ben Breakspear

Semifinals

23 January 2022	South Africa	19–0	Australia	Estadio Ciudad de Málaga
14:09	Try: JC Pretorius 5'; Ndhlovu 8', S. Davids 10'; Con: Du Preez 5' 11'	Report	Cards: Turner (YC) 4'	Referee: Jeremy Rozier

23 January 2022	England	17–26	Argentina	Estadio Ciudad de Málaga
14:31	Try: Boyland 7'; Davis 10', Coulson 15'; Con: Coulson 11'	Report	Try: Gonzalez 4'; Del Mestre 6', Velez 9'; Isgro 13'; Con: Del Mestre 4' 6' 9'	Referee: Paulo Duarte

3rd place final

23 January 2022	Australia	20–24	England	Estadio Ciudad de Málaga
17:59	Try: Hutchison 1'; Longbottom 4'; Toole 10' 16'	Report	Try: Barden 5', Homer 8'; Coulson 8', Roddick 12'; Con: Coulson 14' 13'; Cards: Coulson (YC); Browning (YC)	Referee: Ben Breakspear

Final

23 January 2022	South Africa	24–17	Argentina	Estadio Ciudad de Málaga
18:56	Try: S. Davids 8' 16'; JC Pretorius 8'; Geduld 13'; Con: Du Preez 8'; Geduld 16'	Report	Try: Isgro 1'; De la Vega 10' 11'; Con: Del Mestre 11'	Referee: Adam Leal

== Placings – Málaga ==
Fiji was a late withdrawal from the tournament but was not replaced in the draw. As such, despite not competing, Fiji finished equal-last in Málaga and received one point toward their season standings.

Place	Team	Points
1st place, gold medalist(s)	South Africa	22
2nd place, silver medalist(s)	Argentina	19
3rd place, bronze medalist(s)	England	17
4	Australia	15
5	France	13
6	United States	12
7	Ireland	10
7	Canada	10

Place	Team	Points
9	Spain	8
10	Wales	7
11	Germany	5
11	Scotland	5
13	Japan	3
14	Jamaica	2
15	Kenya	1
15	Fiji	1

Source: World Rugby

== Pool stage – Seville ==
The second tournament was held at Estadio La Cartuja in Seville on 28–30 January 2022. South Africa won the event, defeating Australia in the final by 33–7.

All times in Central European Time (GMT+01:00). The pools were scheduled as follows:

Key: Team advanced to the quarterfinals

=== Pool A – Seville ===
Samoa was included in the draw but did not compete in the tournament so there were only three teams in Pool A. Samoa's matches were scored as 0–0 byes and their opponents gained 3 points in the pool standings for each bye.

Team	W	D	L	PF	PA	PD	Pts
South Africa	2	0	0	57	31	+26	9
United States	1	0	1	47	50	−3	7
Spain	0	0	2	38	61	−23	5
~~Samoa~~	0	0	0	0	0	0	0

28 January 2022	United States	28–26	Spain	Estadio La Cartuja, Seville
16:39	Try: Baker 3'; Williams 5' 10'; Isles 16'; Con: Tomasin 3' 6' 11' 16'	Report	Try: Sainz-Trapaga 6' 14'; Lopez 9'; Serres 12'; Con: Ramos 7', Martinez 13' 14'	Referee: Ben Breakspear

29 January 2022	South Africa	33–12	Spain	Estadio La Cartuja, Seville
10:57	Try: Ndhlovu 6'; S. Davids 10' 11'; Oosthuizen 14', Z. Davids 15'; Con: Du Preez 6'; Geduld 10', Human 14' 16'	Report	Try: Pla 8'; Bolinches 8'; Con: Ramos 8'	Referee: Gianluca Gnecchi

29 January 2022	South Africa	24–19	United States	Estadio La Cartuja, Seville
16:25	Try: Human 6'; Grobbelaar 9', Williams 10' 13'; Con: Du Preez 7'; S. Davids 14'	Report	Try: Williams 4' 8'; Baker 15'; Con: Tomasin 5'	Referee: Adam Leal

=== Pool B – Seville ===
Team	W	D	L	PF	PA	PD	Pts
Argentina	3	0	0	94	12	+82	9
Ireland	2	0	1	67	24	+43	7
Germany	1	0	2	45	71	−26	5
Jamaica	0	0	3	5	104	−99	3

28 January 2022	Ireland	33–5	Germany	Estadio La Cartuja, Seville
15:55	Try: Kelly 4' 7'; Smith 10', Comerford 14'; Awonusi 15'; Con: Roche 5' 7' 14' 16'	Report	Try: Dawe 3'	Referee: Adam Leal

28 January 2022	Argentina	42–0	Jamaica	Estadio La Cartuja, Seville
16:17	Try: Alvarez 4' 11'; Gonzalez 8' 8'; Isgro 13', Sabato 14'; Con: Lamas 5' 8' 8' 11' 13' 15'	Report		Referee: Francisco Gonzalez

29 January 2022	Ireland	22–0	Jamaica	Estadio La Cartuja, Seville
10:13	Try: Phillips 2'; Kennedy 11' 13', Kearns 14'; Con: M Roche 3'; Cards: T Roche (YC)	Report		Referee: Ben Breakspear

29 January 2022	Argentina	33–0	Germany	Estadio La Cartuja, Seville
10:35	Try: Moneta 2'; Alvarez 3', Revol 10'; De la Vega 12'; Con: Del Mestre 3' 11' 12'	Report	Cards: Hees (YC)	Referee: Paulo Duarte

29 January 2022	Germany	40–5	Jamaica	Estadio La Cartuja, Seville
15:41	Try: Merz 1' 6'; Rainger 7', Van der Bosch 10'; Hees 13', Hunt 14'; Con: Heimpel 2' 6' 8' 11'; Van der Bosch 15'; Cards: Hees (YC)	Report	Try: Fe'ssal 4'	Referee: Gianluca Gnecchi

29 January 2022	Argentina	19–12	Ireland	Estadio La Cartuja, Seville
16:03	Try: Feld 2'; De la Vega 6', Moneta 12'; Con: Del Mestre 3' 12'	Report	Try: Phillips 7'; Terry Kennedy 9'; Con: M. Roche 8'	Referee: Jeremy Rozier

=== Pool C – Seville ===
Team	W	D	L	PF	PA	PD	Pts
England	3	0	0	78	37	+41	9
France	2	0	1	98	36	+62	7
Japan	1	0	2	36	76	−40	5
Wales	0	0	3	27	90	−63	3

28 January 2022	France	38–12	Wales	Estadio La Cartuja, Seville
15:11	Try: Sepho 1' 3' 8'; Trouabal 8'; Epee 11', Blanc 14'; Con: Riva 2' 12', Parez 3' 9'	Report	Try: Williams 5'; Rosser 10'; Con: Treharne 10'; Cards: MacRae (YC)	Referee: Finlay Brown

28 January 2022	England	28–10	Japan	Estadio La Cartuja, Seville
15:33	Try: Hyde 2'; Bowen 6' 9', Boyland 12'; Con: Roddick 3' 6' 9'; Boyland 13'; Cards: Clementson (YC)	Report	Try: Ishida 7'; Morita 15'	Referee: Jeremy Rozier

29 January 2022	France	43–0	Japan	Estadio La Cartuja, Seville
09:29	Try: Trouabal 3'; Riva 5', Sepho 7'; Laugel 12', Epee 13' 16'; Huyard 14'; Con: Parez 6'; Riva 8' 12', Blanc 16'	Report		Referee: Adam Leal

29 January 2022	England	26–10	Wales	Estadio La Cartuja, Seville
09:51	Try: Homer 2'; Davis 3', Roddick 4'; Randle 14'; Con: Roddick 2' 3' 4'	Report	Try: Brown 7'; Lewis 12'; Cards: Brown (YC)	Referee: Francisco Gonzalez

29 January 2022	Wales	5–26	Japan	Estadio La Cartuja, Seville
14:57	Try: Treharne 2'; Cards: Treharne (YC)	Report	Try: Nakagawa 4'; Tsuoka 7', Makisi 11'; Fukushi 16'; Con: Ishida 7' 11' Nakagawa 16'; Cards: Kano (YC)	Referee: Finlay Brown

29 January 2022	England	24–17	France	Estadio La Cartuja, Seville
15:19	Try: Boyland 3'; Browning 5', Randle 10' penalty try 15'; Con: Coulson 4'; Cards: Boyland (YC)	Report	Try: Grandidier 8' 14'; Trouabal 8'; Con: Riva 9'; Cards: Riva (YC); Capilla (YC)	Referee: Paulo Duarte

=== Pool D – Seville ===
Team	W	D	L	PF	PA	PD	Pts
Australia	3	0	0	96	19	+77	9
Scotland	2	0	1	42	34	+8	7
Kenya	1	0	2	34	61	−27	5
Canada	0	0	3	22	80	−58	3

28 January 2022	Canada	5–21	Scotland	Estadio La Cartuja, Seville
14:27	Try: Russell 7'	Report	Try: Lowe 5'; Jones 8', Kelly 13'; Con: Lowe 6' 9' 13'; Cards: Barreto (YC), Farndale (YC)	Referee: Paulo Duarte

28 January 2022	Australia	42–0	Kenya	Estadio La Cartuja, Seville
14:49	Try: Hutchison 4' 6'; Longbottom 8'; Toole 8' 11', Yool 14'; Con: Roache 4' 7' 9' 9' 11'; Longbottom 15'	Report		Referee: Gianluca Gnecchi

29 January 2022	Canada	5–24	Kenya	Estadio La Cartuja, Seville
08:45	Try: Ngongo 2'	Report	Try: Humwa 5'; Otieno 8', Omondi 12'; Onyala 14'; Con: Omondi 5'; Amunga 15'	Referee: Finlay Brown

29 January 2022	Australia	19–7	Scotland	Estadio La Cartuja, Seville
09:07	Try: Toole 2' 5'; Dowling 9'; Con: Roache 3' 6'; Cards: Hutchison (YC)	Report	Try: Hughes 12'; Con: Elms 13'; Cards: Kelly (YC)	Referee: Jeremy Rozier

29 January 2022	Scotland	14–10	Kenya	Estadio La Cartuja, Seville
14:13	Try: Lowe 5'; McCann 11'; Con: Lowe 5'; Elms 12'	Report	Try: Onyala 7'; Olindi 10'; Cards: Oluoch (YC)	Referee: Francisco Gonzalez

29 January 2022	Australia	33–12	Canada	Estadio La Cartuja, Seville
14:35	Try: Roache 1'; Longbottom 3', Vosaicake 8'; Yool 14', Dowling 15'; Con: Roache 2' 4' 9'; Longbottom 14' 15'; Cards: Roache (YC)	Report	Try: Coats 9'; Ergas 10'; Con: Coats 9'; Cards: Bain (YC)	Referee: Ben Breakspear

== Knockout stage – Seville ==
=== 13th-place playoffs – Seville ===
Wales had a bye through to the 13th-place final due to Samoa's withdrawal from the tournament.

13th-place semifinals
30 Jan 2022 – 13:00
Canada	40
Jamaica	14

13th-place final
30 Jan 2022 – 17:44
Canada	14
Wales	19

Matches

13th-place semifinals

30 January 2022	Canada	40–14	Jamaica	Estadio La Cartuja, Seville
13:00	Try: Coats 1'; Allen 4' 8', Russell 5'; Thiel 9', Griffiths 9'; Con: Coats 2' 4' 6' 9'; Isherwood 8'	Report	Try: Clayton 7'; Bush 11'; Con: Roy-Smith 8' 11'	Referee: Gianluca Gnecchi

13th-place final

30 January 2022	Canada	14–19	Wales	Estadio La Cartuja, Seville
17:44	Try: Isherwood 1'; Russell 9'; Con: Isherwood 2' 10'	Report	Try: Carson 4'; Swannack 6', Rosser 11'; Con: Lennon 7'; T. Williams 11'	Referee: Francisco Gonzalez

=== 9th-place playoffs – Seville ===
Kenya had a bye through to the 9th-place semifinals due to Samoa's withdrawal from the tournament.

9th-place quarterfinals
29 Jan 2022 – 09:54
Spain	21
Canada	10
29 Jan 2022 – 10:16
Japan	24
Jamaica	19
29 Jan 2022 – 11:00
Germany	17
Wales	7

9th-place semifinals
30 Jan 2022 – 13:22
Spain	26
Japan	5
30 Jan 2022 – 13:44
Germany	7
Kenya	24

9th-place final
30 Jan 2022 – 18:06
Spain	19
Kenya	24

Matches

9th-place quarterfinals

29 January 2022	Spain	21–10	Canada	Estadio La Cartuja, Seville
09:54	Try: Lopez 6' 9'; Moreno 12'; Con: Ramos 6' 9', Martinez 13'; Cards: Bolinches (YC)	Report	Try: Berna 4'; Bain 10'	Referee: Ben Breakspear

30 January 2022	Japan	24–19	Jamaica	Estadio La Cartuja, Seville
10:16	Try: Ishida 4' 9'; Fukushi 8', Makisi 11'; Con: Ishida 10' 11'	Report	Try: Melville 1'; Bingham 6', Stoppani 12'; Con: Roy-Smith 2' 7'; Cards: Stoppani (YC)	Referee: Francisco Gonzalez

30 January 2022	Germany	17–7	Wales	Estadio La Cartuja, Seville
10:38	Try: Ellermann 8'; Hunt 13', Heimpel 14'; Con: Heimpel 15'	Report	Try: M. Williams 10'; Con: M. Williams 10'	Referee: Finlay Brown

9th-place semifinals

30 January 2022	Spain	26–5	Japan	Estadio La Cartuja, Seville
13:22	Try: Lopez 2'; Martinez 4', Soriano 5' 8'; Con: Martinez 3' 4' 6'	Report	Try: Ishii 14'	Referee: Adam Leal

30 January 2022	Germany	7–24	Kenya	Estadio La Cartuja, Seville
13:44	Try: Hunt 5'; Con: Van der Bosch 6'	Report	Try: Odhiambo 2'; Oyoo 7', Otieno 11'; Oluoch 13'; Con: Omondi 7', Olindi 13'	Referee: Jeremy Rozier

9th-place final

30 January 2022	Spain	19–24	Kenya	Estadio La Cartuja, Seville
18:06	Try: Pla 8'; Romero 10'; Moreno 13'; Con: Martinez 8' 10'	Report	Try: Onyala 1'; Oluoch 12', Taabu 15'; Wekesa 17'; Con: Omondi 2', Olindi 12'	Referee: Ben Breakspear

=== 5th-place playoffs – Seville ===
5th-place semifinals
30 Jan 2022 – 14:06
Scotland	10
England	12
30 Jan 2022 – 14:28
United States	19
France	12

5th-place final
30 Jan 2022 – 18:28
England	17
United States	22

Matches

5th-place semifinals

30 January 2022	Scotland	10–12	England	Estadio La Cartuja, Seville
14:06	Try: Elms 6'; Farndale 9'; Cards: McCann (YC)	Report	Try: Davis 2'; Homer 10'; Con: Roddick 2'	Referee: Francisco Gonzalez

30 January 2022	United States	19–12	France	Estadio La Cartuja, Seville
14:28	Try: Isles 1'; Tupuola 7'; Williams 11'; Con: Tomasin 2' 12'	Report	Try: Sepho 10'; Trouabal 13'; Con: Riva 10'; Cards: Sepho (YC)	Referee: Finlay Brown

5th-place final

30 January 2022	England	17–22	United States	Estadio La Cartuja, Seville
18:28	Try: Hyde 6'; Bowen 9' 11'; Con: Coulson 9'; Cards: Homer (YC)	Report	Try: Tupuola 1'; Tomasin 9', Isles 13'; Williams 15'; Con: Tomasin 21'	Referee: Gianluca Gnecchi

=== Cup playoffs – Seville ===
Quarterfinals
29 Jan 2022 – 19:07
South Africa	31
Scotland	24
29 Jan 2022 – 19:35
England	12
Ireland	24
29 Jan 2022 – 20:05
Australia	29
United States	14
29 Jan 2022 – 20:33
Argentina	26
France	21

Semifinals
30 Jan 2022 – 16:06
South Africa	26
Ireland	0
30 Jan 2022 – 16:28
Australia	28
Argentina	12

Final
30 Jan 2022 – 20:26
South Africa	33
Australia	7
3rd place final
30 Jan 2022 – 19:29
Ireland	5
Argentina	12

Matches

Quarterfinals

29 January 2022	South Africa	31–24	Scotland	Estadio La Cartuja, Seville
19:07	Try: Williams 3'; Makata 6', Oosthuizen 9'; S. Davids 9' 13'; Con: Du Preez 4' 7'; Geduld 14'	Report	Try: Farndale 1'; Cullen 5', Barreto 11'; Edmonds 15'; Con: Elms 2'; Barreto 11'; Cards: McCann (YC)	Referee: Paulo Duarte

29 January 2022	England	12–24	Ireland	Estadio La Cartuja, Seville
19:35	Try: Bowen 6'; Randle 14'; Con: Roddick 14'	Report	Try: Comerford 4'; T. Roche 7', M. Roche 9'; Phillips 12'; Con: M. Roche 8' 9'	Referee: Finlay Brown

29 January 2022	Australia	29–14	United States	Estadio La Cartuja, Seville
20:05	Try: Kuridrani 2'; Lawson 8', Longbottom 8'; Turner 10'; Con: Longbottom 8' 9' 11'; Pen: Longbottom 13'	Report	Try: Isles 5'; Baker 6'; Con: Tomasin 5' 7'	Referee: Jeremy Rozier

29 January 2022	Argentina	26–21	France	Estadio La Cartuja, Seville
20:33	Try: Isgro 3'; De la Vega 6', Moneta 7'; Sabato 14'; Con: Del Mestre 4' 6' 8'	Report	Try: Trouabal 1'; Parez 9', Sepho 10'; Con: Riva 2' 9' 10'; Cards: Trouabal (YC)	Referee: Gianluca Gnecchi

Semifinals

30 January 2022	South Africa	26–0	Ireland	Estadio La Cartuja, Seville
16:06	Try: Grobbelaar 6'; Williams 8', Geduld 10'; S. Davids 14'; Con: S. Davids 6' 8'; Williams 15'	Report	Cards: Kennedy (YC)	Referee: Gianluca Gnecchi

30 January 2022	Australia	28–12	Argentina	Estadio La Cartuja, Seville
16:28	Try: Toole 4' 8'; Hutchison 6', Longbottom 12'; Con: Roache 4' 7' 12'; Longbottom 8'; Cards: Roache (YC)	Report	Try: Gonzalez 1'; Sabato 15'; Con: Del Mestre 1'	Referee: Adam Leal

3rd place final

30 January 2022	Ireland	5–10	Argentina	Estadio La Cartuja, Seville
19:29	Try: O'Sullivan 4'	Report	Try: Revol 7'; Isgro 11'; Con: Del Mestre 12'	Referee: Paulo Duarte

Final

30 January 2022	South Africa	33–7	Australia	Estadio La Cartuja, Seville
20:26	Try: Grobbelaar 8' 8'; Oosthuizen 10', Adonis 13'; Visser 15'; Con: S. Davids 9' 9' 10' 15'; Cards: Adonis (YC) 10'	Report	Try: Dowling 6'; Con: Roache 7'; Cards: Turner (YC) 10'; Longbottom (YC) 11'	Referee: Jeremy Rozier

== Placings – Seville ==
Samoa was a late withdrawal from the tournament but was not replaced in the draw. As such, despite not competing, Samoa finished equal-last in Seville and received one point toward their season standings.

Place	Team	Points
1st place, gold medalist(s)	South Africa	22
2nd place, silver medalist(s)	Australia	19
3rd place, bronze medalist(s)	Argentina	17
4	Ireland	15
5	United States	13
6	England	12
7	France	10
7	Scotland	10

Place	Team	Points
9	Kenya	8
10	Spain	7
11	Germany	5
11	Japan	5
13	Wales	3
14	Canada	2
15	Jamaica	1
15	Samoa	1

Source: World Rugby

== See also ==
- 2022 Spain Women's Sevens

World Sevens Series XXIII
Preceded by 2021 Dubai Sevens	2022 Spain Sevens	Succeeded by 2022 Singapore Sevens
Spain Sevens
Preceded by None (first event)	2022 Spain Sevens	Succeeded by To be determined
