= 2022 Canada Sevens =

Rugby sevens tournament

- Sevens World Series XXIII
- Host nation: Canada
- Date: 16–17 April 2022

Cup
- Champion: Argentina
- Runner-up: Fiji
- Third: Australia

Tournament details
- Matches played: 45
- Tries scored: 286 (average 6.36 per match)
- Most points: Marcos Moneta (50 points)
- Most tries: Marcos Moneta (10 tries)

The 2022 Canada Sevens was a rugby sevens tournament for men's national teams held on 16–17 April 2022 at BC Place, Vancouver, British Columbia, Canada as part of the 2021–22 World Rugby Sevens Series.

The event was won by Argentina, with player of the match Marcos Moneta scoring two tries in their 29–10 win against Fiji in the final.

Australia defeated Samoa with a last-minute try in their 21-19 win to take bronze in the third-place playoff. South Africa, the defending Canada Sevens champions from the two events in 2021, beat the 2020 event winners New Zealand in the fifth-place playoff.

== Format ==
The sixteen teams were drawn into four pools of four. Each team played the three opponents in their pool once. The top two teams from each pool advanced to the Cup bracket, with the losers of the quarter-finals vying for a fifth-place finish. The remaining eight teams that finished third or fourth in their pool played off for 9th place, with the losers of the 9th-place quarter-finals competing for 13th place.

== Teams ==
The sixteen national teams competing in Canada were:

- Argentina
- Australia
- Canada
- England
- Fiji
- France
- Ireland
- Japan
- Kenya
- New Zealand
- Samoa
- Scotland
- South Africa
- Spain
- United States
- Wales

== Pool stage ==
The pools were announced on 10 April.

Team advances to the Cup quarter-finals

=== Pool A ===
Team	Pld	W	D	L	PF	PA	PD	Pts
Fiji	3	3	0	0	98	31	+67	9
England	3	1	0	2	50	59	–9	5
United States	3	1	0	2	49	71	–22	5
Kenya	3	1	0	2	38	74	–36	5

16 April
10:31 PDT (UTC–7)

United States	17–19	Kenya
	Report

BC Place

16 April
10:53 PDT (UTC–7)

Fiji	27–12	England
	Report

BC Place

16 April
13:42 PDT (UTC–7)

United States	20–19	England
	Report

BC Place

16 April
14:04 PDT (UTC–7)

Fiji	38–7	Kenya
	Report

BC Place

16 April
17:07 PDT (UTC–7)

Kenya	12–19	England
	Report

BC Place

16 April
17:35 PDT (UTC–7)

Fiji	33–12	United States
	Report

BC Place

=== Pool B ===
Team	Pld	W	D	L	PF	PA	PD	Pts
New Zealand	3	3	0	0	109	43	+66	9
Samoa	3	2	0	1	85	53	+32	7
Wales	3	1	0	2	36	78	–42	5
Japan	3	0	0	3	38	94	–56	3

16 April
9:44 PDT (UTC–7)

Samoa	26–12	Wales
	Report

BC Place

16 April
10:06 PDT (UTC–7)

New Zealand	40–14	Japan
	Report

BC Place

16 April
12:55 PDT (UTC–7)

Samoa	35–10	Japan
	Report

BC Place

16 April
13:17 PDT (UTC–7)

New Zealand	38–5	Wales
	Report

BC Place

16 April
16:06 PDT (UTC–7)

Wales	19–14	Japan
	Report

BC Place

16 April
16:28 PDT (UTC–7)

New Zealand	31–24	Samoa
	Report

BC Place

=== Pool C ===
Team	Pld	W	D	L	PF	PA	PD	Pts
South Africa	3	3	0	0	72	45	+27	9
Australia	3	2	0	1	85	32	+53	7
Canada	3	1	0	2	50	66	–16	5
Spain	3	0	0	3	33	97	–64	3

16 April
11:15 PDT (UTC–7)

South Africa	31–12	Spain
	Report

BC Place

16 April
11:37 PDT (UTC–7)

Australia	26–10	Canada
	Report

BC Place

16 April
14:26 PDT (UTC–7)

South Africa	19–14	Canada
	Report

BC Place

16 April
14:48 PDT (UTC–7)

Australia	40–0	Spain
	Report

BC Place

16 April
18:05 PDT (UTC–7)

Spain	21–26	Canada
	Report

BC Place

16 April
18:33 PDT (UTC–7)

Australia	19–22	South Africa
	Report

BC Place

=== Pool D ===
Team	Pld	W	D	L	PF	PA	PD	Pts
Argentina	3	2	1	0	62	36	+26	8
France	3	2	1	0	62	43	+19	8
Ireland	3	1	0	2	50	67	–17	5
Scotland	3	0	0	3	36	64	–28	3

16 April
9:00 PDT (UTC–7)

Argentina	12–12	France
	Report

BC Place

16 April
9:22 PDT (UTC–7)

Ireland	19–12	Scotland
	Report

BC Place

16 April
12:11 PDT (UTC–7)

Argentina	24–5	Scotland
	Report

BC Place

16 April
12:33 PDT (UTC–7)

Ireland	12–29	France
	Report

BC Place

16 April
15:22 PDT (UTC–7)

France	21–19	Scotland
	Report

BC Place

16 April
15:44 PDT (UTC–7)

Ireland	19–26	Argentina
	Report

BC Place

== Knockout stage ==
=== 13th–16th playoffs ===
13th place Semi-finals
17 April – BC Place
United States	33
Japan	12
17 April – BC Place
Kenya	7
Spain	24

13th place Final
17 April – BC Place
United States	33
Spain	24

Matches

Semi-finals

17 April	United States	33–12	Japan	BC Place
12:20 PDT (UTC–7)		Report

17 April	Kenya	7–24	Spain	BC Place
12:42 PDT (UTC–7)		Report

13th place Final

17 April	United States	33–24	Spain	BC Place
15:28 PDT (UTC–7)		Report

=== 9th–12th playoffs ===
Quarter-finals
17 April – BC Place
United States	12
Scotland	24
17 April – BC Place
Canada	29
Japan	5
17 April – BC Place
Ireland	21
Kenya	14
17 April – BC Place
Wales	19
Spain	14

Semi-finals
17 April – BC Place
Canada	26
Scotland	22
17 April – BC Place
Ireland	14
Wales	12

9th Place Final
17 April – BC Place
Canada	7
Ireland	17

Matches

Quarter-finals

17 April	United States	12–24	Scotland	BC Place
9:00 PDT (UTC–7)		Report

17 April	Canada	29–5	Japan	BC Place
9:22 PDT (UTC–7)		Report

17 April	Ireland	21–14	Kenya	BC Place
9:44 PDT (UTC–7)		Report

17 April	Wales	19–14	Spain	BC Place
10:06 PDT (UTC–7)		Report

Semi-finals

17 April	Scotland	22–26	Canada	BC Place
13:04 PDT (UTC–7)		Report

17 April	Ireland	14–12	Wales	BC Place
13:26 PDT (UTC–7)		Report

9th place Final

17 April	Canada	7–17	Ireland	BC Place
16:37 PDT (UTC–7)		Report

=== 5th–8th playoffs ===
5th place Semi-finals
17 April – BC Place
France	7
South Africa	36
17 April – BC Place
England	5
New Zealand	34

5th place Final
17 April – BC Place
South Africa	17
New Zealand	15

Matches

Semi-finals

17 April	France	7–36	South Africa	BC Place
14:00 PDT (UTC–7)		Report

17 April	New Zealand	34–5	England	BC Place
14:22 PDT (UTC–7)		Report

5th place Final

17 April	South Africa	17–15	New Zealand	BC Place
17:01 PDT (UTC–7)		Report

=== Cup playoffs ===
Quarter-finals
17 April – BC Place
Fiji	24
France	21
17 April – BC Place
South Africa	17
Samoa	28
17 April – BC Place
Argentina	40
England	17
17 April – BC Place
New Zealand	12
Australia	19

Semi-finals
17 April – BC Place
Fiji	45
Samoa	5
17 April – BC Place
Argentina	24
Australia	12

Cup Final
17 April – BC Place
Fiji	10
Argentina	29
Third place
17 April – BC Place
Samoa	19
Australia	21

Matches

Quarter-finals

17 April	Fiji	24–21	France	BC Place
10:40 PDT (UTC–7)		Report

17 April	South Africa	17–28	Samoa	BC Place
11:02 PDT (UTC–7)		Report

17 April	Argentina	40–17	England	BC Place
11:24 PDT (UTC–7)		Report

17 April	New Zealand	12–19	Australia	BC Place
11:46 PDT (UTC–7)		Report

Semi-finals

17 April	Fiji	45–5	Samoa	BC Place
14:44 PDT (UTC–7)		Report

17 April	Australia	12–24	Argentina	BC Place
15:06 PDT (UTC–7)		Report

Third place

17 April	Samoa	19–21	Australia	BC Place
17:28 PDT (UTC–7)		Report

Cup Final

17 April	Argentina	29–10	Fiji	BC Place
17:58 PDT (UTC–7)		Report

=== Placings ===
Place	Team	Points
1st place, gold medalist(s)	Argentina	22
2nd place, silver medalist(s)	Fiji	19
3rd place, bronze medalist(s)	Australia	17
4	Samoa	15
5	South Africa	13
6	New Zealand	12
7	England	10
7	France	10

Place	Team	Points
9	Ireland	8
10	Canada	7
11	Scotland	5
11	Wales	5
13	United States	3
14	Spain	2
15	Japan	1
15	Kenya	1

== See also ==
- 2022 Canada Sevens (for women)

Sevens Series XXIII
Preceded by 2022 Singapore Sevens	2022 Canada Sevens	Succeeded by 2022 France Sevens
Canada Sevens
Preceded by 2021 Canada Sevens	2022 Canada Sevens	Succeeded by 2023 Canada Sevens
