= 2021–22 World Rugby Sevens Series =

23rd annual international series of tournaments in men's rugby sevens

2021–22 World Rugby Sevens
- Series XXIII
- Hosts: United Arab Emirates; Spain; Singapore; Canada; France; England; United States
- Date: 26 November 2021 – 28 August 2022

Final positions
- Champions: Australia
- Runners-up: South Africa
- Third: Fiji

Series details
- Top try scorer: Terry Kennedy (50)
- Top point scorer: Dietrich Roache (343)

The 2021–22 World Rugby Sevens Series was the 23rd annual series of rugby sevens tournaments for national men's rugby sevens teams. The Sevens Series has been run by World Rugby since 1999.

The series was won by Australia 7s, claiming their first World Series title. Second-placed South Africa opened the competition by winning the first four tournaments, with a 36-match winning streak that lasted until the 2022 Singapore Sevens where they were beaten by the United States in pool play, but they did not make the semifinals in any of the remaining events.

There was no relegation required at the end of the season as the number of core teams was reduced when England, Scotland and Wales were combined to play as Great Britain for the 2022–23 series.

== Core teams ==
The core teams remained unchanged from the previous series due to the impact of the COVID-19 pandemic which curtailed the last two seasons. The sixteen core teams qualified to participate in all 2021–22 tournaments were:

- Argentina
- Australia
- Canada
- England
- Fiji
- France
- Ireland
- Japan (Note: Japan did not compete in the 2021 series but had core team status for it after winning the Challenger Series in 2020 and kept that status for 2021–22.)
- Kenya
- New Zealand
- Samoa
- Scotland
- South Africa
- Spain
- United States
- Wales (Note: As there was no relegation in the previous two seasons, Wales retained core status despite being the lowest-placed core team in 2019–20.)

== Tour venues ==
The schedule for the series was:

2021–22 Itinerary
Leg	Stadium	City	Dates	Winner
Dubai (2 events)	The Sevens	Dubai	26–27 November 2021	South Africa
Dubai (2 events)	The Sevens	Dubai	3–4 December 2021	South Africa
Spain (2 events)	Estadio Ciudad de Málaga	Málaga	21–23 January 2022	South Africa
Spain (2 events)	Estadio de La Cartuja	Seville	28–30 January 2022	South Africa
Singapore	National Stadium	Singapore	9–10 April 2022	Fiji
Canada	BC Place	Vancouver	16–17 April 2022 (Note: The Canada Sevens event was moved from 26–27 February to 16–17 April due to COVID-19 logistical challenges.)	Argentina
France	Stade Ernest-Wallon	Toulouse	20–22 May 2022	Fiji
England	Twickenham Stadium	London	28–29 May 2022	Australia
United States	Dignity Health Sports Park	Los Angeles	27–28 August 2022 (Note: The USA Sevens event was moved from 5–6 March to 27–28 August due to ongoing COVID-19 logistical challenges.)	New Zealand

== Standings ==
Due to the impacts of the COVID-19 pandemic, World Rugby revised the method used for the series standings in the interest of fairness to teams not able to participate in all rounds of the 2021–22 season. This system excluded the two lowest-scored rounds from each team in the final standings. So, with nine tournaments in the series, only the best seven tournament results for each team contributed to the ranking points.

The final standings after completion of the nine tournaments of the series are shown in the table below.

The points awarded to teams at each tournament, as well as the overall season totals, are shown. Gold indicates the event champions. Silver indicates the event runner-ups. Bronze indicates the event third place finishers.

Official standings for the 2021 series were:

2021–22 World Rugby Sevens – Series XXIII
Pos.	Event Team	Dubai I	Dubai II	Málaga	Seville	Singapore	Vancouver	Toulouse	London	Los Angeles	Points total	Ranking points (Note: The ranking points contains only the total of points for the seven best tournaments (for each team, respectively))	Points difference (Note: The points difference is the margin of points scored for and against (from all matches in only the seven best tournaments for each team, respectively))
1	Australia	13^{†}	19	15	19	17	17	10^{†}	22	17	149	126	+502
2	South Africa	22	22	22	22	10	13	5^{†}	13	3^{†}	132	124	+541
3	Fiji (Note: Fiji and Samoa did not play in the two tournaments in Spain following positive COVID-19 tests in their squads. As Fiji was not replaced in the schedule for Málaga and Samoa not replaced for Seville, their opponents advanced by walkover in those tournaments. As such, Fiji finished equal-last in Málaga and received one point in the season standings. Similarly, Samoa finished equal-last in Seville and received one point in the season standings.)	15	8	—^{1†}	—^{†}	22	19	22	17	19	123	122	+482
4	Argentina	17	17	19	17	13†	22	13	8^{†}	13	139	118	+375
5	Ireland	11	10^{†}	10	15	15	8^{†}	19	12	10	110	92	+87
6	United States	19	11	12	13	12	3^{†}	10	7^{†}	10	97	87	–1
7	France	8^{†}	15	13	10	8	10	17	5^{†}	8	94	81	+338
8	New Zealand (Note: New Zealand missed the first four tournaments due to travel logistics and travel-related restrictions from the COVID-19 pandemic.)	—^{†}	—^{†}	—	—	19	12	8	19	22	80	80	+373
9	Samoa	—^{†}	—^{†}	—	—^{1}	10	15	15	15	15	71	71	+125
10	England (Note: England, Scotland and Wales were represented by Great Britain in the first two events held in Dubai. For the remaining events, they competed as separate national unions. Each team received one-third of the points earned by Great Britain in the first two rounds: four points each for Dubai I, five points each for Dubai II.)	—^{4†}	—^{5}	17	12	3^{†}	10	12	10	5	78	71	–115
11	Spain	7	7	8	7	7	2^{†}	5	10	1^{†}	54	51	–44
12	Kenya	10	12	1^{†}	8	5	1^{†}	1	1	12	51	49	–181
13	Scotland	—^{4†}	—^{5}	5	10	1^{†}	5	7	5	7	49	44	–139
14	Canada	6	5	10	2	1^{†}	7	1^{†}	3	1^{†}	36	34	–289
15	Wales	—^{4}	—^{5}	7	3	5	5	2^{†}	1^{†}	5	37	34	–322
16	Japan	5	6	3	5	2^{†}	1^{†}	3	2	2	29	26	–636
17	Great Britain	12	13	—	—	—	—	—	—	—	25	25	–11
18	Germany	—	—	5	5	—	—	—	—	—	10	10	+19
19	Jamaica	—	—	2	1	—	—	—	—	—	3	3	–285

Source: World Rugby

Legend
Event Medalists
Gold	Event Champions
Silver	Event Runner-ups
Bronze	Event Third place finishers
Qualification for the 2021–22 World Rugby Sevens Series
No colour	Core team
Yellow	Invited team

== Placings summary ==
Tallies of top-four placings in tournaments during the 2021–22 series, by team:

Team	(gold) Gold	(silver) Silver	(bronze) Bronze	Fourth	Total
South Africa	4	—	—	—	4
Fiji	2	2	1	1	6
Australia	1	2	3	1	7
New Zealand	1	2	—	—	3
Argentina	1	1	3	—	5
Ireland	—	1	—	2	3
United States	—	1	—	—	1
France	—	—	1	1	2
England	—	—	1	—	1
Samoa	—	—	—	4	4

== Player statistics ==
=== Dream Team ===
(Australia) Nick Malouf
(Argentina) Luciano González
(South Africa) Zain Davids
(Argentina) Marcos Moneta
(Fiji) Waisea Nacuqu
(Ireland) Terry Kennedy
(Australia) Corey Toole

=== Scoring ===
Tries scored
Rank	Player	Tries
1	Terry Kennedy	50
2	Corey Toole	43
3	Marcos Moneta	38
3	Nelson Épée	38
5	Kevon Williams	33
6	Luciano González	30
6	Siviwe Soyizwapi	30
8	Jordan Sepho	29
9	Viwa Naduvalo	28
10	Joachim Trouabal	27

Points scored
Rank	Player	Points
1	Dietrich Roache	343
2	Terry Kennedy	250
3	Stephen Tomasin	234
4	Waisea Nacuqu	230
5	Corey Toole	215
6	Paulin Riva	202
7	Ronald Brown	194
8	Marcos Moneta	190
8	Nelson Épée	190
10	Kevon Williams	167

Updated: 29 August 2022

=== Performance ===
Impact Player winner
Tour Leg	Player	Points	Ref
Dubai I	Terry Kennedy	64	
Dubai II	Waisea Nacuqu	60	
Málaga	Corey Toole	62	
Seville	Corey Toole	69	
Singapore	Corey Toole	69	
Vancouver	Kaminieli Rasaku	75	
Toulouse	Terry Kennedy	66	
London	Va'a Apelu Maliko	67	
Los Angeles	Paul Scanlan	70	

Total Impact Player points
Rank	Player	T	B	O	C	Total
1	Corey Toole	75	45	48	161	467
2	Terry Kennedy	52	38	38	220	462
3	Dietrich Roache	80	22	41	164	392
4	Kaminieli Rasaku	73	32	37	129	372
5	Jordan Sepho	50	31	44	117	348
6	Luciano Gonzalez	39	32	10	173	328
7	Billy Odhiambo	59	17	27	156	320
8	Henry Hutchison	106	15	17	134	319
9	Josh Turner	103	19	20	113	313
10	Kevon Williams	43	34	16	126	303

Key: T = Tackles (1 pt), B = Line breaks (3 pts), O = Offloads (2 pts), C = Carries (1 pt)

Updated: 29 August 2022

== Tournaments ==
=== Dubai I ===
Event	Winner	Score	Finalist
Cup	South Africa	42–7	United States
Bronze	Argentina	19–12	Fiji
5th Place	Australia	35–21	Great Britain
7th Place	Ireland	29–7	Kenya
9th Place	France	28–26	Spain
11th Place	Canada	22–14	Japan

=== Dubai II ===
Event	Winner	Score	Finalist
Cup	South Africa	10–7	Australia
Bronze	Argentina	38–21	France
5th Place	Great Britain	10–5	Kenya
7th Place	United States	26–19	Ireland
9th Place	Fiji	31–7	Spain
11th Place	Japan	21–12	Canada

=== Malaga ===
Event	Winners	Score	Finalists	Semifinalists
Cup	South Africa	24–17	Argentina	England (Bronze) Australia
5th Place	France	28–12	United States	Ireland Canada
9th Place	Spain	34–5	Wales	Scotland Germany
13th Place	Japan	29–24	Jamaica	Kenya ~~Fiji~~

=== Seville ===
Event	Winners	Score	Finalists	Semifinalists
Cup	South Africa	33–7	Australia	Argentina (Bronze) Ireland
5th Place	United States	22–17	England	France Scotland
9th Place	Kenya	24–19	Spain	Germany Japan
13th Place	Wales	19–14	Canada	Jamaica ~~Samoa~~

=== Singapore ===
Event	Winners	Score	Finalists	Semifinalists
Cup	Fiji	28–17	New Zealand	Australia (Bronze) Ireland
5th Place	Argentina	42–24	United States	Samoa South Africa
9th Place	France	24–19	Spain	Kenya Wales
13th Place	England	28–14	Japan	Canada Scotland

=== Vancouver ===
Event	Winners	Score	Finalists	Semifinalists
Cup	Argentina	29–10	Fiji	Australia (Bronze) Samoa
5th Place	South Africa	17–15	New Zealand	England France
9th Place	Ireland	17–7	Canada	Scotland Wales
13th Place	United States	33–24	Spain	Japan Kenya

=== Toulouse ===
Event	Winners	Score	Finalists	Semifinalists
Cup	Fiji	29–17	Ireland	France (Bronze) Samoa
5th Place	Argentina	21–12	England	Australia United States
9th Place	New Zealand	42–7	Scotland	South Africa Spain
13th Place	Japan	28–14	Wales	Canada Kenya

=== London ===
Event	Winners	Score	Finalists	Semifinalists
Cup	Australia	19–14	New Zealand	Fiji (Bronze) Samoa
5th Place	South Africa	14–5	Ireland	England Spain
9th Place	Argentina	31–5	United States	France Scotland
13th Place	Canada	26–19	Japan	Kenya Wales

=== Los Angeles ===
Event	Winners	Score	Finalists	Semifinalists
Cup	New Zealand	28–21	Fiji	Australia (Bronze) Samoa
5th Place	Argentina	29–7	Kenya	Ireland United States
9th Place	France	33–0	Scotland	England Wales
13th Place	South Africa	26–0	Japan	Spain Canada

== See also ==
- 2021–22 World Rugby Women's Sevens Series
- Rugby sevens at the 2020 Summer Olympics (played in 2021)
- Rugby sevens at the 2022 Commonwealth Games (only members of the Commonwealth of Nations)
