= Aaron Grandidier-Nkanang =

French rugby union player (born 2000)

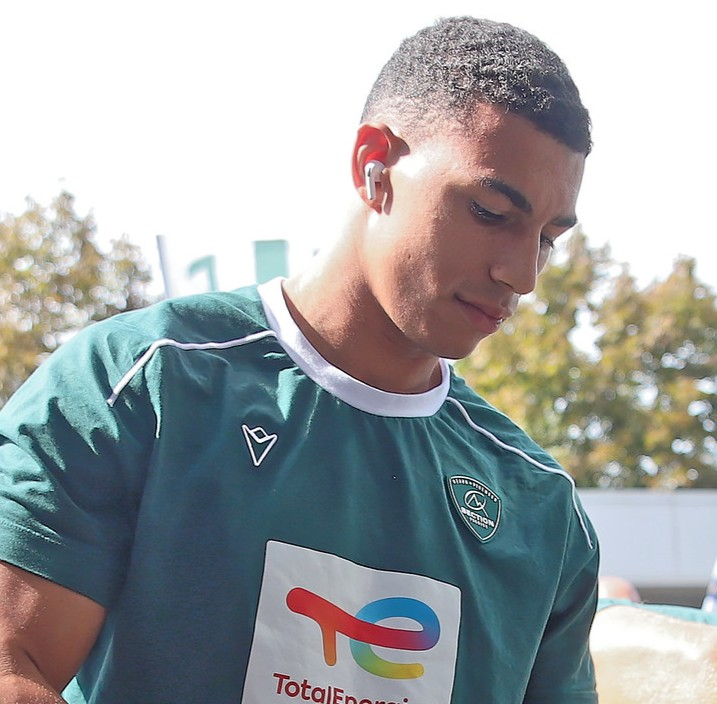
- 2025
- Full name: Aaron Grandidier Nkanang
- Born: 18 May 2000 (age 26) Bromley, Greater London, England
- Height: 186 cm (6 ft 1 in)
- Weight: 94 kg (207 lb)
- University: St Mary's University, Twickenham

Rugby union career
- Position(s): Wing, Full-back
- Current team: Pau
Senior career
Years	Team	Apps	(Points)
2019–2024	Brive	7	(0)
2024–	Pau	48	(75)
- Correct as of 9 November 2026
International career
Years	Team	Apps	(Points)
2026–	France	3	(15)
- Correct as of 9 November 2026
National sevens team
Years	Team		Comps
2022–2024	France		
Medal record
Men's rugby sevens
Representing France
Olympic Games
Gold medal – first place	2024 Paris	Team competition

Aaron Grandidier-Nkanang (born 18 May 2000) is an English-born French professional rugby union player who plays wing or full back for Top 14 club Pau and the France national team. He won a gold medal as part of the France national rugby sevens team at the 2024 Paris Olympics.

== Early and personal life ==
Born to a Nigerian father and French mother, Grandidier grew up in Bromley. He was a keen basketball player in his youth. He is also a DJ, under the moniker 'Aztec'. His younger sister is the singer-songwriter Amie Blu.

Grandidier-Nkanang attended St Olave's Grammar School. He initially intended to study design at Loughborough University, but earned a scholarship to St Mary's University, Twickenham that allowed him to continue playing rugby at his local club.

== Club career ==
He started playing rugby at St Olave's Grammar School in London and played at county level for Kent U18 and joined his first amateur club Old Elthamians. He joined CA Brive in 2019.

=== Brive ===
In 2019, he signed for French club Brive. In December 2021, he made his senior debut in the Challenge Cup during a loss against Leicester Tigers, going on to feature in the following round against Zebre. In September 2022, he made his Top 14 debut during a 12–6 victory against Castres.

=== Pau ===
He signed for Section Paloise ahead of the 2024–25 season. In September 2024, he made his debut for the club 49–25 victory against La Rochelle in the Top14.

In September 2025, he scored his first try of the season in a 34–10 victory against Stade Français. That same month, he also extended his current deal with the club until 2029. In October 2025, he scored two tries in a 30–26 victory against Toulouse.

== International career ==
In 2022, he made his debut for the senior France national rugby sevens team. At the Hong Kong sevens during the 2022–23 SVNS season he scored a French record 11 tries in a single weekend.

In July 2024, he was confirmed in the French team for the 2024 Paris Olympics. He scored twice in the quarter-final against Argentina to help France reach the semi-finals of the tournament. In November 2024, he was nominated for World Rugby Men's Sevens Player of the Year at the World Rugby Awards.

In October 2025, he was selected for the senior squad ahead of the 2025 Autumn Nations Series. In July 2026, Grandidier-Nkanang was named for his France debut against Australia in the inaugural Nations Championship in Brisbane, scoring two tries in a 42–26 victory. A try-scorer on 7 November in the Nations Championship against Fiji, he scored again in the next match on 13 November in a 21–19 France win against South Africa.

=== International tries ===
List of international tries scored by Aaron Grandidier-Nkanang
No.	Opponent	Location	Competition	Date	Result	Ref.
1	Australia	Lang Park, Brisbane	2026 Nations Championship	11 July 2026	42–26	
2	Australia	Lang Park, Brisbane	2026 Nations Championship	11 July 2026	42–26	
3	Fiji	Parc Olympique Lyonnais, Décines-Charpieu	2026 Nations Championship	8 November 2026	54–17	

== Honours ==
France

- 1x Six Nations Championship: 2026
