= Spain Sevens =

Annual World Rugby Sevens Series tournament

- Sport: Rugby sevens
- First season: 2022
- No. of teams: 16
- Website: spain7s.com

The Spain Sevens is an annual international rugby sevens tournament that was played as two back-to-back events on consecutive weekends in late January that year. The first event was held in Málaga at Estadio Ciudad de Málaga and the second was held in Seville at Estadio de La Cartuja. These events were hosted by the Spanish Rugby Federation as the third and fourth stops on the 2021–22 season of the World Rugby Sevens Series for national men's teams.

== Results ==
| Year | Venue | Cup final | | | Placings | | | Refs |
|---|---|---|---|---|---|---|---|---|
| | | Winner | Score | Runner-up | Third | Fourth | Fifth | |
| 2022 I | Estadio Ciudad de Málaga | South Africa | 22–17 | Argentina | England | Australia | France | |
| 2022 II | Estadio La Cartuja | South Africa | 33–7 | Australia | Argentina | Ireland | United States | |
| 2024 | Metropolitano Stadium | France | 19–5 | Argentina | Fiji | New Zealand | Ireland | |

== See also ==
- Spain Women's Sevens
