= Jonathan Laugel =

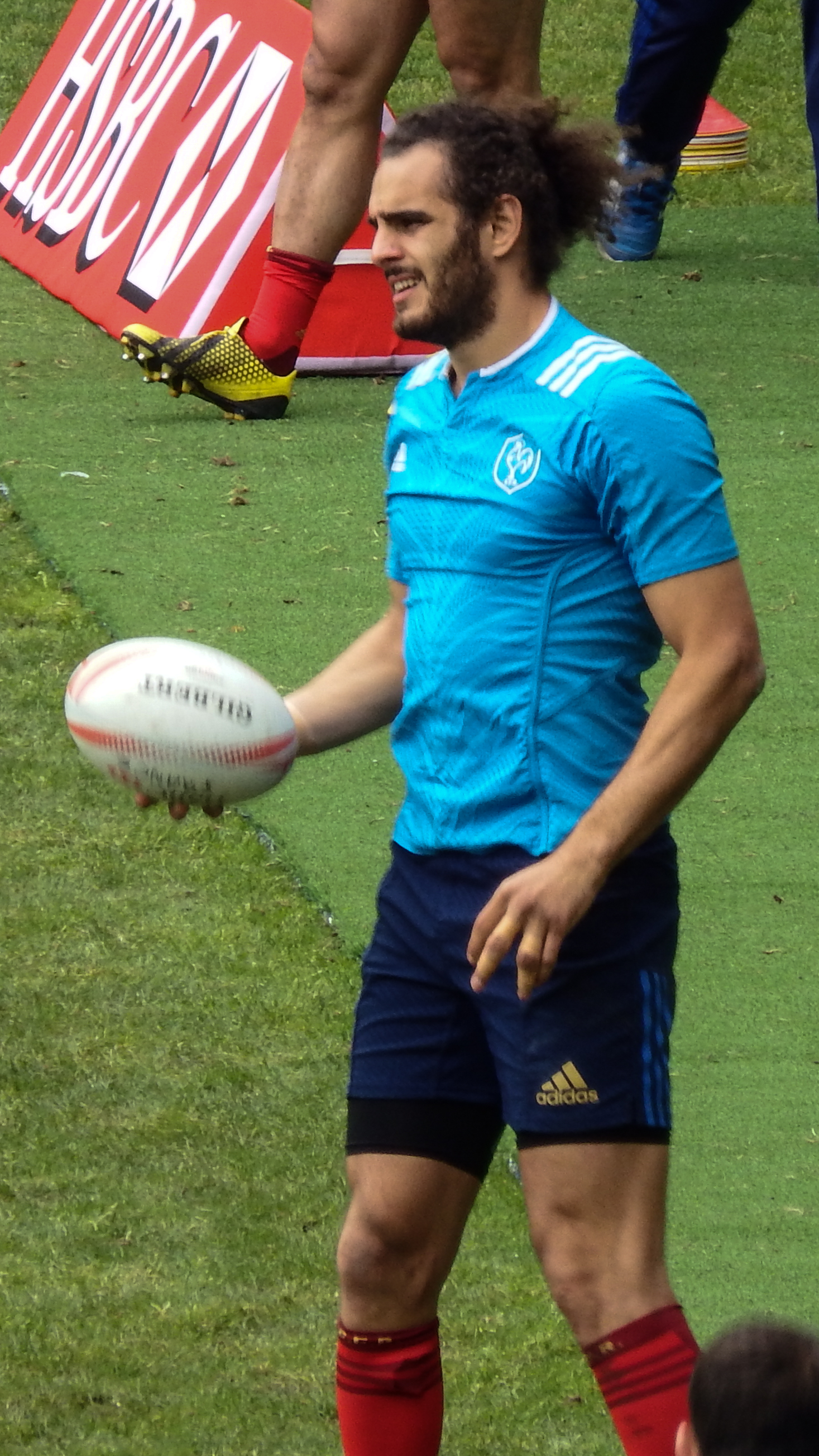
- Laugel in 2016
- Born: 30 January 1993 (age 33) Montmorency, Val-d'Oise, France
- Height: 1.94 m (6 ft 4 in)
- Weight: 100 kg (220 lb)

Rugby union career
- Position: Forward
International career
Years	Team	Apps	(Points)
- France U-20
National sevens team
Years	Team		Comps
2012-	France 7s		

Jonathan Laugel (born 30 January 1993) is a French rugby seven forward who competed at the 2016 Olympics. He has been playing rugby sevens since 2011 and is contracted to the French Rugby Federation. He made his debut at the 2012 Wellington Sevens.

Laugel competed for France at the 2022 Rugby World Cup Sevens in Cape Town.

== Personal life ==
Laugel has also participated in Judo and Basketball. He is studying management at the Grenoble School of Management.
