= Nelson Épée =

French rugby sevens player (born 2001)

- Born: 20 February 2001 (age 25)
- Height: 174 cm (5 ft 9 in)
- Weight: 73 kg (161 lb; 11 st 7 lb)

Rugby union career
National sevens team
Years	Team	Comps
- France 7s
Medal record
Men's rugby sevens
Representing France
Olympic Games
Gold medal – first place	2024 Paris	Team

Nelson Épée (born 20 February 2001) is a French rugby sevens player. He was selected for the 2024 Summer Olympics. He was part of the French team that won gold after defeating Fiji in the final.
