= Kevon Williams =

American rugby player (born 1991)

Personal information
- Born: June 7, 1991 (age 35)
- Home town: Houston, Texas, U.S.
- Height: 5 ft 10 in (1.78 m)
- Weight: 185 lb (84 kg)

Rugby union career
- Position(s): Half-back (7s); Wing (15s)
National sevens team
Years	Team	Comps
2016–present	USA 7s	

Kevon Williams (born June 7, 1991) is an American rugby player who plays for the United States national rugby sevens team on the World Rugby Sevens Series.

== Early life and career ==
Williams is originally from Houston, Texas. He attended Westbury High School and college at the New Mexico Highlands. He also played American football as a wide receiver with the New Mexico Highlands Cowboys until 2012. He picked up rugby in 2013. His strong rugby play with New Mexico earned him the 2014 College Sevens Player of the Year award by Rugby Today magazine, in large part due to his play at the 2014 NSCRO national championship. Williams helped New Mexico win two straight NSCRO 7s titles in 2015 and 2016.

== International career ==
Williams was called into the U.S. national team in November 2016 for the 2016 Dubai Sevens and 2016 South Africa Sevens, replacing Carlin Isles who was out with an injury. During the 2017–18 season, with halfback Madison Hughes picking up an injury, Williams saw extensive playing time including several starts, appearing in 47 matches and scoring 14 tries. Williams experienced increased playing contributions in the 2018–19 season, often coming on early in the second-half as a substitute for Folau Niua, with Williams playing in 52 matches and scoring 18 tries. Williams was a consistent starter during the 2021–22 World Series.

He captained the United States sevens team at the 2024 Summer Olympics in Paris.
