= Estadio Ciudad de Málaga =

Stadium in Málaga, Spain

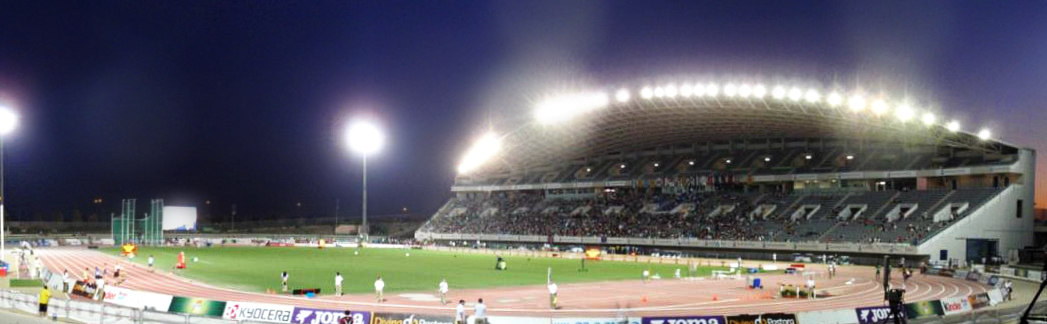
- Host of the 2011 Spanish Athletics Championships
- Interactive map of Estadio Ciudad de Málaga
- Location: Málaga, Spain
- Coordinates: 36.6812°N 4.4579°W
- Capacity: 10,816

Construction
- Groundbreaking: 2003
- Opened: 27 June 2009

Estadio Ciudad de Málaga is a multi-purpose stadium in Málaga, Spain. The facility can accommodate 10,816 spectators.

== History ==
Construction of the stadium began in December 2003 and it was put into use in 2005, although the facility was not fully ready at that time. It was reopened after the completion of the works on 27 June 2009.

=== Athletics ===
The venue hosted the 2006 European Athletics Cup, and also the Spanish Athletics Championships in 2005 and 2011.

=== Football ===
In 2009, the women's football team Málaga CF Femenino began using the Ciudad de Málaga stadium as their usual field of play for Primera División matches and also as a training venue. The men's Málaga CF team began training there during the 2010–2011 Segunda División season.

In July 2020, the stadium hosted some matches in the promotion phase to the men's Segunda División.

In July 2025 CDU Malacitano announced that this stadium will be their home ground starting in the 2025–26 Segunda Federación season. In addition, starting in the 2026–27 season, Málaga CF will play its matches at this stadium due to improvement works at La Rosaleda Stadium.

International football matches have also been played at the venue.

Date	Competition	Match			Result	Attendance
18 January 2010	Friendly	South Korea	vs	Finland	0–2	
22 January 2010	Friendly	South Korea	vs	Latvia	1–0	
2 February 2013	Friendly	Poland	vs	Romania	4–1	
6 February 2013	Friendly	Romania	vs	Australia	3–2	

=== Rugby union ===
On 19 November 2016, the first international rugby was played at Ciudad de Málaga stadium. It was a test match for the Spanish national team against Uruguay that ended with victory for the "XV del León" home team in front of more than 10,000 spectators.

Date	Competition	Match			Result	Attendance
19 November 2016	Test match	Spain	vs	Uruguay	33–16	10,000
22 November 2025	Autumn Internationals	Spain	vs	Fiji	33-41	7,500
20 November 2026	Nations Cup	Spain	vs	Samoa	-	

Sevens

The stadium was a venue for the Spain Sevens leg of the World Rugby Sevens Series in 2022.
