= 2021 Dubai Sevens =

World Rugby Sevens Series tournaments

- Sevens World Series XXIII
- Host nation: United Arab Emirates

Dubai – Event I
- Date: 26–27 November 2021
- Champion: South Africa
- Runner-up: United States
- Third: Argentina

Tournament details
- Matches played: 34
- Tries scored: 205 (average 6.03 per match)

Dubai – Event II
- Date: 3–4 December 2021
- Champion: South Africa
- Runner-up: Australia
- Third: Argentina

Tournament details
- Matches played: 34
- Tries scored: 212 (average 6.24 per match)

The 2021 Dubai Sevens was held as two rugby sevens tournaments on consecutive weekends in late November and early December that year. They were played as the fifty-first season of the Dubai Sevens, following the cancellation of the 2020 tournament due to the impact of the COVID-19 pandemic.

These events in Dubai were the opening tournaments of the 2021–22 World Rugby Sevens Series. Due to ongoing impacts of the pandemic, the first event was played behind closed doors on 26–27 November 2021, with no spectators allowed. The second event was played on 3–4 December in front of full crowds. The second event replaced the originally scheduled Cape Town Sevens event. The Cape Town Sevens event was cancelled due to the ongoing impacts of the COVID-19 pandemic.

As only twelve men's teams instead of the usual sixteen competed in 2021 at Dubai, the Olympic format of three pools with four teams in each was used for both tournaments. The Sevens stadium in Dubai provided two fields for use in these events, which allowed matches in overlapping time slots to be played.

South Africa won back-to-back titles in Dubai, defeating the United States in the final of the first tournament and Australia in the final of the second tournament.

== Format ==
The twelve teams at each tournament were drawn into three pools of four teams each. A round-robin was held for each pool, where every team played each of the other three in their pool once. The top two teams from each pool, plus the two best third-placed on comparative pool standings, advanced to the Cup quarterfinals to compete for tournament honours. The other teams from each pool went to the challenge playoffs for ninth to twelfth place.

== Teams ==
The twelve national men's teams competing at both tournaments in Dubai were:

- Argentina
- Australia
- Canada
- Fiji
- France
- Great Britain
- Ireland
- Japan
- Kenya
- South Africa
- Spain
- United States

Core teams eligible to play but not participating at Dubai were:

- England, Scotland and Wales, who were represented by Great Britain for the first two tournaments of the 2021–22 Series, before competing again as separate national unions for the remainder of the series.
- New Zealand and Samoa, who did not participate in Dubai due to the challenges of COVID-19 travel logistics.

== Dubai: Event I ==
The first tournament was held with no crowd in attendance at The Sevens stadium in Dubai on 26–27 November 2021. South Africa won the tournament, defeating United States by 42–7 in the final.

All times in UAE Standard Time (UTC+4:00). The pools were scheduled as follows:

Key: Team advanced to the quarterfinals

=== Pool A – Event I ===
Pos	Team	Pld	W	D	L	PF	PA	PD	Pts
1	Fiji	3	3	0	0	70	43	+27	9
2	Australia	3	2	0	1	64	46	+18	7
3	France	3	1	0	2	53	55	−2	5
4	Canada	3	0	0	3	47	90	−43	3

26 November
11:00

Australia	35–19	Canada
Try: Nick Malouf 3'; Maurice Longbottom 11'; Dietrich Roache 13'; Billy Meakes 14'; Josh Turner 15'; Con: Maurice Longbottom 4',11',14',16'; Dietrich Roache 13'	Report	Try: Josiah Morra 1',9'; Nicholas Allen 7'; Con: Cooper Coats 2',9'

The Sevens Stadium, Dubai
Referee: Jeremy Rozier

26 November
11:22

Fiji	24–17	France
Try: Filipe Sauturaga 5',9'; Kaminieli Rasaku 9'; Iowane Teba 11'; Con: Iowane Teba 6'; Waisea Nacuqu 9'	Report	Try: Jordan Sepho 2'; Nelson Epee 14', 16'; Con: William Iraguha 15'

The Sevens Stadium, Dubai
Referee: AJ Jacobs

26 November
14:30

Australia	17–10	France
Try: Corey Toole 5'; Dietrich Roache 8'; Henry Hutchison 12'; Con: Dietrich Roache 12'	Report	Try: Jordan Sepho 10'; Nelson Epee 14'

The Sevens Stadium, Dubai
Referee: Ben Breakspear

26 November
14:52

Fiji	29–14	Canada
Try: Iowane Teba 1'; Kaminieli Rasaku 3',12'; Joseva Talacolo 5'; Iowane Raturaciri 14'; Con: Iowane Teba 6'; Waisea Nacuqu 13'	Report	Try: Josiah Morra 8'; Cooper Coats 8'; Con: Cooper Coats 8',8'

The Sevens Stadium, Dubai
Referee: Jaco De Wit

26 November
18:35

Canada	14–26	France
Try: Josiah Morra 6'; Andrew Coe 8'; Con: Cooper Coats 7', 9'	Report	Try: Varian Pasquet 2'; Paulin Riva 5',11'; Jordan Sepho 14'; Con: Paulin Riva 5',12'

The Sevens Stadium, Dubai
Referee: Gianluca Gnecchi

26 November
19:33

Fiji	17–12	Australia
Try: Iowane Teba 3',12'; Iowane Raturaciri 15'; Con: Daniele Yaya 15'	Report	Try: Josh Turner 7'; Ben Dowling 9'; Con: Dietrich Roache 8'

The Sevens Stadium, Dubai
Referee: AJ Jacobs

=== Pool B – Event I ===
Pos	Team	Pld	W	D	L	PF	PA	PD	Pts
1	Argentina	3	2	1	0	71	45	+26	8
2	United States	3	1	1	1	42	40	+2	6
3	Kenya	3	1	0	2	50	48	+2	5
4	Spain	3	1	0	2	31	61	−30	5

26 November
10:16

United States	14–7	Kenya
Try: Steve Tomasin 6'; Logan Tago 10'; Con: Steve Tomasin 7',10'	Report	Try: Herman Humwa 8'; Con: Daniel Taabu 8'

The Sevens Stadium, Dubai
Referee: Morne Ferierra

26 November
10:38

Argentina	28–7	Spain
Try: Luciano Gonzalez 3',8'; Joaquin de la Vega 5'; Tomas Lizazu 13'; Con: Felipe Del Mestre 4',6'; Lautaro Bazan Velez 8'; Santiago Vera Feld 14'	Report	Try: Pol Pla 10'; Con: Juan Ramos 11'

The Sevens Stadium, Dubai
Referee: Gianluca Gnecchi

26 November
14:08

United States	7–12	Spain
Try: Gavan D'Amore 5'; Con: Steve Tomasin 5'	Report	Try: Eduardo Lopez 9'; Juan Martinez 10'; Con: Juan Martinez 9'

The Sevens Stadium, Dubai
Referee: AJ Jacobs

26 November
14:30

Argentina	22–17	Kenya
Try: Luciano Gonzalez 3', 5'; German Schulz 13'; Santiago Alvarez 16'; Con: Santiago Vera Feld 5'	Report	Try: Alvin Otieno 6'; Levy Amunga 8'; Jeff Oluoch 9'; Con: Levy Amunga 9'

The Sevens Stadium, Dubai
Referee: Jeremy Rozier

26 November
17:02

Kenya	26–12	Spain
Try: Johnstone Olindi 6'; Billy Odhiambo 8',12'; Herman Humwa 8'; Con: Levy Amunga 6'; Anthony Omondi 9',12'	Report	Try: Eduardo Lopez 2'; Juan Ramos 13'; Con: Juan Martinez 2'

The Sevens Stadium, Dubai
Referee: Ben Breakspear

26 November
17:24

Argentina	21–21	United States
Try: Tomas Lizazu 8'; Santiago Alvarez 9'; Con: Tomas Lizazu 8'; Joaquin Lamas 10'	Report	Try: Carlin Isles 3',7'; Steve Tomasin 14'; Con: Steve Tomasin 4',8',14'

The Sevens Stadium, Dubai
Referee: Jaco De Wit

=== Pool C – Event I ===
Pos	Team	Pld	W	D	L	PF	PA	PD	Pts
1	South Africa	3	3	0	0	111	31	+80	9
2	Great Britain	3	2	0	1	55	62	−7	7
3	Ireland	3	1	0	2	59	54	+5	5
4	Japan	3	0	0	3	24	102	−78	3

26 November
09:32

South Africa	28–7	Ireland
Try: Selvyn Davids 2',8'; Ronald Brown 8',15'; Con: Selvyn Davids 3',8'; Ronald Brown 9',15'	Report	Try: Sean Cribbin 13'; Con: Sean Cribbin 13'

The Sevens Stadium, Dubai
Referee: Ben Breakspear

26 November
09:54

Great Britain	17–12	Japan
Try: Robbie Ferguson 2'; Alex Davis 9'; Max McFarland 11'; Con: Luke Treharne 12'	Report	Try: Kavaia Tagivetaua 7'; Jonathan Faauli 15'; Con: Ryota Kano 8'

The Sevens Stadium, Dubai
Referee: Jaco De Wit

26 November
13:24

South Africa	52–12	Japan
Try: Muller du Plessis 2'; Siviwe Soyizwapi 5', 7'; Selvyn Davids 6',12'; Zain Davids 8'; Christie Grobbelaar 11'; Shaun Williams 14'; Con: Ronald Brown 2',5',6',8',11'; Branco du Preez 13'	Report	Try: Netani Vakayalia 4'; Tomoya Yamamura 9'; Con: Ryota Kano 4'

The Sevens Stadium, Dubai
Referee: Gianluca Gnecchi

26 November
13:46

Great Britain	26–19	Ireland
Try: Jamie Farndale 3'; Ross McCann 8'; Tom Bowen 13'; Jamie Barden 14'; Con: Robbie Fergusson 9',13'; Jamie Barden 15'	Report	Try: Jude Postlethwaite 6'; Terry Kennedy 9'; Niall Comerford 10'; Con: Billy Dardis 7',9'

The Sevens Stadium, Dubai
Referee: Morne Ferierra

26 November
16:08

Ireland	33–0	Japan
Try: Terry Kennedy 1',5',9'; Liam Turner 4'; Ed Kelly 14'; Con: Mark Roche 4',5',9; Billy Dardis 15'	Report

The Sevens Stadium, Dubai
Referee: Morne Ferierra

26 November
16:40

Great Britain	12–31	South Africa
Try: Robbie Fergusson 3'; Ross McCann 9'; Con: Frederick Roddick 9'	Report	Try: Muller du Plessis 5'; Siviwe Soyizwapi 7, 12'; Impi Visser 10'; Branco du Preez 14'; Con: Ronald Brown 5', 11', 15'

The Sevens Stadium, Dubai
Referee: Jeremy Rozier

=== 9th to 12th playoffs – Event I ===
9th place semifinals
27 Nov 2021 – 12:01 – The Sevens Stadium
Spain	45
Canada	14
27 Nov 2021 – 12:23 – The Sevens Stadium
France	35
Japan	0

9th place final
27 Nov 2021 – 15:24 – The Sevens Stadium
Spain	26
France	28
11th place final
27 Nov 2021 – 15:02 – The Sevens Stadium
Canada	22
Japan	14

Matches

9th place semifinals

27 November
12:01

Spain	45–14	Canada
Try: De La Rosa 1' 3'; Ramos 4' 9'; Moreno 8' 11' 11' 13'; Con: Ramos 2' 4' 5' 8' 9'	Report	Try: Coe 6'; Bowen 16'; Con: Coats 6' 16'

The Sevens Stadium, Dubai
Referee: Jeremy Rozier

27 November
12:23

France	35–0	Japan
Try: Trouabal 1' 6'; Tchaptchet 9'; Epee 12'; Sepho 14'; Con: Iraguha 1' 6' 9' 13'; Riva 15'	Report

The Sevens Stadium, Dubai
Referee: Ben Breakspear

11th place final

27 November
15:02

Canada	22–14	Japan
Try: Allen 4' 8'; Sauder 6' 9'; Con: Coats 4'	Report	Try: Tawhai 14'; Tsuoka 15'; Con: Tawhai 14'; Hayashi 15'

The Sevens Stadium, Dubai
Referee: Jaco De Wit

9th place final

27 November
15:24

Spain	26–28	France
Try: Moreno 2'; Lopez 6' 7'; Romero 10'; Con: Ramos 3' 7' 8'	Report	Try: Huyard 4'; Rebbadj 9'; Sepho 12'; Epee 15'; Con: Riva 5' 10' 12'; Parez 15'

The Sevens Stadium, Dubai
Referee: Gianluca Gnecchi

=== 5th to 8th playoffs – Event I ===
5th place semifinals
27 Nov 2021 – 13:29 – The Sevens Stadium
Ireland	14
Australia	35
27 Nov 2021 – 13:51 – The Sevens Stadium
Great Britain	33
Kenya	5

5th place final
27 Nov 2021 – 17:15 – The Sevens Stadium
Australia	35
Great Britain	21
7th place final
27 Nov 2021 – 16:13 – The Sevens Stadium
Ireland	29
Kenya	7

Matches

5th place semifinals

27 November
13:29

Ireland	14–35	Australia
Try: Kennedy 13'; Comerford 15'; Con: Roche 13' 15'	Report	Try: Toole 2'; Malouf 4'; Roache 8' 9'; Turner 10'; Con: Roache 2' 4' 8' 9' 11'

The Sevens Stadium, Dubai
Referee: AJ Jacobs

27 November
13:51

Great Britain	33–5	Kenya
Try: Williams 2'; Roddick 9'; Barden 12'; Bowen 14'; Trenholm 15'; Con: Roddick 2' 10' 13' 15'	Report	Try: Otieno 5'

The Sevens Stadium, Dubai
Referee: Morne Ferierra

7th place final

27 November
16:13

Ireland	29–7	Kenya
Try: Kennedy 2' 7' 9'; O'Sullivan 5'; Kelly 15'; Con: Roche 2' 7'	Report	Try: Humwa 11'; Con: Omondi 12'

The Sevens Stadium, Dubai
Referee: Ben Breakspear

5th place final

27 November
17:15

Australia	35–21	Great Britain
Try: Roache 1'; Hutchison 5'; Toole 9' 11'; Turner 12'; Con: Roache 2' 6' 9' 11' 13'	Report	Try: Williams 7'; Kelly 14'; Farndale 15'; Con: Roddick 8'; Fergusson 14' 15'

The Sevens Stadium, Dubai
Referee: Morne Ferierra

=== Cup playoffs – Event I ===
Quarterfinals
27 Nov 2021 – 10:28 – The Sevens
Argentina	17
Ireland	12
27 Nov 2021 – 10:50 – The Sevens Stadium
South Africa	29
Australia	5
27 Nov 2021 – 11:12 – The Sevens Stadium
United States	35
Great Britain	17
27 Nov 2021 – 11:34 – The Sevens Stadium
Fiji	19
Kenya	5

Semifinals
27 Nov 2021 – 14:18 – The Sevens Stadium
Argentina	7
South Africa	17
27 Nov 2021 – 14:40 – The Sevens Stadium
United States	21
Fiji	19

Final
27 Nov 2021 – 19:26 – The Sevens Stadium
South Africa	42
United States	7
3rd place final
27 Nov 2021 – 18:29 – The Sevens Stadium
Argentina	19
Fiji	12

Matches

Quarterfinals

27 November
10:28

Argentina	17–12	Ireland
Try: Schulz 1'; Del Mestre 3'; Lizazu 16'; Con: Gonzalez 3'	Report	Try: Kennedy 6' 10'; Con: Roche 10'

The Sevens Stadium, Dubai
Referee: Morne Ferierra

27 November
10:50

South Africa	29–5	Australia
Try: JC Pretorius 2'; Soyizwapi 6' 10'; S Davids 11'; T Pretorius 15'; Con: Du Preez 15'	Report	Try: Hutchison 8'

The Sevens Stadium, Dubai
Referee: Gianluca Gnecchi

27 November
11:12

United States	35–17	Great Britain
Try: Iosefo 2'; Williams 6' 14'; Baker 10'; Isles 12'; Con: Tomasin 3' 7' 10' 12' 15'	Report	Try: Farndale 5'; Fergusson 10'; McCann 8'; Con: Fergusson 11'

The Sevens Stadium, Dubai
Referee: AJ Jacobs

27 November
11:34

Fiji	19–5	Kenya
Try: Talacolo 6'; Sauturaga 9'; Qeruqeru 11'; Con: Nacuqu 7' 10'	Report	Try: Humwa 4'

The Sevens Stadium, Dubai
Referee: Jaco De Wit

Semifinals

27 November
14:18

Argentina	7–17	South Africa
Try: Isgro 5'; Con: Gonzalez 6'	Report	Try: Van Wyk 7'; Soyizwapi 11'; JC Pretorius 14'; Con: Brown 7'

The Sevens Stadium, Dubai

27 November
14:40

United States	21–19	Fiji
Try: Isles 7'; Lacamp 9'; Leuta 12'; Con: Tomasin 7' 10' 12'	Report	Try: Teba 3'; Sauturaga 5'; Rasaku 9'; Con: Nacuqu 4' 6'

The Sevens Stadium, Dubai
Referee: Jeremy Rozier

3rd place final

27 November
18:29

Argentina	19–12	Fiji
Try: Lamas 2' 8'; De la Vega 9'; Con: Lamas 9' 9'	Report	Try: Vakurunabili 7'; Qeruqeru 12'; Con: Nacuqu 8'

The Sevens Stadium, Dubai

Final

27 November
19:26

South Africa	42–7	United States
Try: Brown 2' 8' 8'; JC Pretorius 6'; S Davids 9'; Williams 14'; Con: Brown 3' 6' 9' 9' 10'; Du Preez 15'	Report	Try: Lacamp 13'; Con: Tomasin 13'

The Sevens Stadium, Dubai
Referee: Jeremy Rozier

=== Placings – Event I ===
Place	Team	Points
1st place, gold medalist(s)	South Africa	22
2nd place, silver medalist(s)	United States	19
3rd place, bronze medalist(s)	Argentina	17
4	Fiji	15
5	Australia	13
6	Great Britain	12

Place	Team	Points
7	Ireland	11
8	Kenya	10
9	France	8
10	Spain	7
11	Canada	6
12	Japan	5

Source: World Rugby

== Dubai: Event II ==
The second tournament was played with spectators in attendance at The Sevens stadium in Dubai on 3–4 December 2021. South Africa won the tournament, defeating Australia by 10–7 in the final.

All times in UAE Standard Time (UTC+4:00). The pools were scheduled as follows:

Key: Team advanced to the quarterfinals

=== Pool A – Event II ===
Pos	Team	Pld	W	D	L	PF	PA	PD	Pts
1	South Africa	3	3	0	0	90	19	+71	9
2	Great Britain	3	2	0	1	67	56	+11	7
3	Ireland	3	1	0	2	74	45	+29	5
4	Japan	3	0	0	3	14	125	−111	3

3 December
10:50

Great Britain	24–21	Ireland
	Report

The Sevens Stadium, Dubai

3 December
11:12

South Africa	48–0	Japan
	Report

The Sevens Stadium, Dubai

3 December
14:42

Great Britain	36–14	Japan
	Report

The Sevens Stadium, Dubai

3 December
15:04

South Africa	21–12	Ireland
	Report

The Sevens Stadium, Dubai

3 December
19:35

Ireland	41–0	Japan
	Report

The Sevens Stadium, Dubai

3 December
20:33

South Africa	21–7	Great Britain
	Report

The Sevens Stadium, Dubai

=== Pool B – Event II ===
Pos	Team	Pld	W	D	L	PF	PA	PD	Pts
1	Australia	3	3	0	0	67	50	+17	9
2	United States	3	2	0	1	81	57	+24	7
3	Kenya	3	1	0	2	61	59	+2	5
4	Canada	3	0	0	3	45	88	−43	3

3 December
09:44

Australia	21–14	Kenya
	Report

The Sevens Stadium, Dubai

3 December
10:28

United States	38–14	Canada
	Report

The Sevens Stadium, Dubai

3 December
13:58

Australia	24–17	Canada
	Report

The Sevens Stadium, Dubai

3 December
14:20

United States	24–21	Kenya
	Report

The Sevens Stadium, Dubai

3 December
17:46

Kenya	26–14	Canada
	Report

The Sevens Stadium, Dubai

3 December
18:08

United States	19–22	Australia
	Report

The Sevens Stadium, Dubai

=== Pool C – Event II ===
Pos	Team	Pld	W	D	L	PF	PA	PD	Pts
1	Argentina	3	2	0	1	52	71	−19	7
2	France	3	2	0	1	72	55	+17	7
3	Spain	3	1	0	2	61	73	−12	5
4	Fiji	3	1	0	2	76	62	+14	5

3 December
09:22

Fiji	17–22	France
	Report

The Sevens Stadium, Dubai

3 December
10:06

Argentina	21–14	Spain
	Report

The Sevens Stadium, Dubai

3 December
13:14

Fiji	19–33	Spain
	Report

The Sevens Stadium, Dubai

3 December
13:36

Argentina	24–17	France
	Report

The Sevens Stadium, Dubai

3 December
16:36

France	33–14	Spain
	Report

The Sevens Stadium, Dubai

3 December
17:24

Argentina	7–40	Fiji
	Report

The Sevens Stadium, Dubai

=== 9th to 12th playoffs – Event II ===
9th place semifinals
4 Dec 2021 –09:44 – The Sevens Stadium
Fiji	33
Canada	19
4 Dec 2021 –10:06 – The Sevens Stadium
Spain	31
Japan	7

9th place final
4 Dec 2021 –13:38 – The Sevens Stadium
Fiji	31
Spain	7
11th place final
4 Dec 2021 –13:16 – The Sevens Stadium
Canada	12
Japan	21

Matches

9th place semifinals

4 December
09:44

Fiji	33–19	Canada
	Report

The Sevens Stadium, Dubai

4 December
10:06

Spain	31–7	Japan
	Report

The Sevens Stadium, Dubai

11th place final

4 December
13:16

Canada	12–21	Japan
	Report

The Sevens Stadium, Dubai

9th place final

4 December
13:38

Fiji	31–7	Spain
	Report

The Sevens Stadium, Dubai

=== 5th to 8th playoffs – Event II ===
5th place semifinals
4 Dec 2021 –13:35 – The Sevens Stadium
Ireland	19
Great Britain	24
4 Dec 2021 –13:57 – The Sevens Stadium
United States	0
Kenya	29

5th place final
4 Dec 2021 –17:03 – The Sevens Stadium
Great Britain	10
Kenya	5
7th place final
4 Dec 2021 –17:26 – The Sevens Stadium
Ireland	19
United States	26

Matches

5th place semifinals

4 December
13:35

Ireland	19–24	Great Britain
	Report

The Sevens Stadium, Dubai

4 December
13:57

United States	0–29	Kenya
	Report

The Sevens Stadium, Dubai

7th place final

4 December
17:26

Ireland	19–26	United States
	Report

The Sevens Stadium, Dubai

5th place final

4 December
17:03

Great Britain	10–5	Kenya
	Report

The Sevens Stadium, Dubai

=== Cup playoffs – Event II ===
Quarterfinals
4 Dec 2021 –09:44 – The Sevens Stadium
Australia	24
Ireland	12
4 Dec 2021 –10:06 – The Sevens Stadium
Argentina	33
Great Britain	12
4 Dec 2021 –10:28 – The Sevens Stadium
United States	12
France	28
4 Dec 2021 –10:50 – The Sevens Stadium
South Africa	31
Kenya	19

Semifinals
4 Dec 2021 –14:24 – The Sevens Stadium
Australia	40
Argentina	0
4 Dec 2021 –14:46 – The Sevens Stadium
France	12
South Africa	19

Final
4 Dec 2021 –19:26 – The Sevens Stadium
Australia	7
South Africa	10
3rd place final
4 Dec 2021 –18:29 – The Sevens Stadium
Argentina	38
France	21

Matches

Quarterfinals

4 December
09:44

Australia	24–12	Ireland
	Report

The Sevens Stadium, Dubai

4 December
10:06

Argentina	33–12	Great Britain
	Report

The Sevens Stadium, Dubai

4 December
10:28

United States	12–28	France
	Report

The Sevens Stadium, Dubai

4 December
10:50

South Africa	31–19	Kenya
	Report

The Sevens Stadium, Dubai

Semifinals

4 December
14:24

Australia	40–0	Argentina
	Report

The Sevens Stadium, Dubai

4 December
14:46

France	12–19	South Africa
	Report

The Sevens Stadium, Dubai

3rd place final

4 December
18:29

Argentina	38–21	France
	Report

The Sevens Stadium, Dubai

Final

4 December
19:26

Australia	7–10	South Africa
	Report

The Sevens Stadium, Dubai

=== Placings – Event II ===
Place	Team	Points
1st place, gold medalist(s)	South Africa	22
2nd place, silver medalist(s)	Australia	19
3rd place, bronze medalist(s)	Argentina	17
4	France	15
5	Great Britain	13
6	Kenya	12

Place	Team	Points
7	United States	11
8	Ireland	10
9	Fiji	8
10	Spain	7
11	Japan	6
12	Canada	5

Source: World Rugby

== See also ==
- 2021 Dubai Women's Sevens

World Sevens Series XXIII
Preceded by None (first event)	2021 Dubai Sevens	Succeeded by 2022 Spain Sevens
Dubai Sevens
Preceded by 2019 Dubai Sevens	2021 Dubai Sevens	Succeeded by 2022 Dubai Sevens
