= France national rugby sevens team =

France
- Union: French Rugby Federation
- Coach: Benoît Baby
- Captain: Jonathan Laugel
- Top scorer: Terry Bouhraoua (1,173)
- Most tries: Terry Bouhraoua (131)
Team kit	Change kit

World Cup Sevens
- Appearances: 8 (First in 1993)
- Best result: Quarter-finals (1997, 2005, 2013)

France national rugby sevens team
Medal record

Olympic Games
Gold medal – first place	2024 Paris	Team

The France national rugby sevens team competes in the World Rugby Sevens Series, Rugby World Cup Sevens, and other international tournaments. France's best finish in the World Series has been finishing in first (Grand Finals), which they accomplished in 2023–24. France are the reigning Olympic champions, having defeated reigning champions Fiji in the final in 2024.

== World Rugby Sevens Series ==
World Series record
Position	Times	Seasons
1st (Grand Finals)	1	2023–24
4th	1	2022–23
5th	1	2024–25
6th	1	2019–20
7th	4	2003–04, 2005–06, 2021–22, 2025–26
8th	5	1999–00, 2002–03, 2004–05, 2006–07, 2018–19
9th	3	2001–02, 2011–12, 2012–13
10th	2	2010–11, 2013–14
11th	3	2014–15, 2015–16, 2016–17
12th	1	2007–08
13th	4	2000–01, 2008–09, 2009–10, 2017–18
14th - 16th	0	

== Tournament history ==
=== Summer Olympic Games ===
Olympic Games record
Year	Round	Position	Pld	W	L	D	Qualified
(Brazil) 2016	Quarterfinals	7th	6	3	3	0	Won the 2015 Rugby Europe Grand Prix Series
(Japan) 2020	Did not qualify						
(France) 2024	Finals	1st	6	4	1	1	Host nation
Total	1 Title	2/3	12	7	4	1	

Olympic Games History
2016	Pool stage	France 31 – 14 Australia	Win
2016	Pool stage	France 0 – 26 South Africa	Loss
2016	Pool stage	France 26 – 5 Spain	Win
2016	Quarter-final	France 7 – 12 Japan	Loss
2016	5–8th place semi-final	France 19 – 24 New Zealand	Loss
2016	7th–8th place playoff	France 12 – 10 Australia	Win
2024	Pool stage	France 12 – 12 United States	Draw
2024	Pool stage	France 19 – 12 Uruguay	Win
2024	Pool stage	France 12 – 19 Fiji	Loss
2024	Quarter-final	France 26 – 14 Argentina	Win
2024	Semi-final	France 19 – 5 South Africa	Win
2024	Final	France 28 – 7 Fiji	Win

=== Rugby World Cup Sevens ===
World Cup record
Year	Round	Position	Pld	W	L	D
(Scotland) 1993	Bowl Semi-Finalists	15th	6	2	4	0
(Hong Kong) 1997	Quarterfinalsts	8th	5	4	1	0
(Argentina) 2001	Bowl Quarterfinalsts	21st	6	2	4	0
(Hong Kong) 2005	Quarterfinalists	5th	6	4	2	0
(United Arab Emirates) 2009	Plate Quarterfinals	13th	4	2	2	0
(Russia) 2013	Quarterfinalists	5th	4	2	1	1
(United States) 2018	Quarterfinals	8th	4	2	2	0
(South Africa) 2022	5th place final	6th	4	2	2	0
Total	0 Titles	8/8	35	18	16	1

=== Europe Grand Prix Series ===
France has been successful in the Rugby Europe Sevens Grand Prix Series. They have won the tournament twice, in 2014 and 2015. They have also finished second on six occasions, most recently in 2016, and third once in 2012.

Grand Prix record
Finish	Times	Series
1st	2	2014, 2015
2nd	7	2003, 2007, 2009, 2010, 2013, 2016, 2019
3rd	1	2012
4th	3	2002, 2005, 2006
5th	2	2004, 2011
DNP	1	2008

=== Rugby X Tournament ===
Rugby X Tournament
Year	Round	Pld	W	L	D
(England) 2019	Semi-finals	3	2	1	0

== Players ==
=== Current squad ===
The following players have been selected to represent France during the 2023–24 SVNS tournament beginning in December 2023.

Note: Caps reflect the total number of SVNS events competed in as of the 2023 Dubai Sevens.

Player	Position	Date of birth (age)	Caps	Club/province
Jonathan Laugel	Forward	30 January 1993 (age 33)	90	Unattached
Paul Leraitre	Forward	7 December 2000 (age 25)	9	Racing 92
Rayan Rebbadj	Forward	15 August 1999 (age 26)	13	Toulon
Paulin Riva (c)	Forward	20 April 1994 (age 32)	41	Auch
Jordan Sepho	Forward	8 December 1998 (age 27)	18	Unattached
Andy Timo	Forward	28 May 2004 (age 22)	4	Stade Français
Antoine Zeghdar	Forward	22 May 1999 (age 27)	11	Castres
Théo Forner	Back	17 October 2001 (age 24)	9	Perpignan
Aaron Grandidier	Back	18 May 2000 (age 26)	14	Section Paloise
William Iraguha	Back	27 June 1997 (age 28)	24	Unattached
Jefferson-Lee Joseph	Back	29 August 2002 (age 23)	8	Agen
Stephen Parez	Back	1 August 1994 (age 31)	70	Unattached
Varian Pasquet	Back	29 July 1999 (age 26)	18	Unattached

== Records and statistics ==
=== Player records ===
The following shows leading career France players based on performance in the World Rugby Sevens Series. Players in bold are still active.

Tries scored
No.	Player	Tries
1	Terry Bouhraoua	131
2	Julien Candelon	114
3	**Stephen Parez**	105
4	Paul Albaladejo	86
5	Renaud Delmas	83

=== Award winners ===
The following France Sevens players have been recognised at the World Rugby Awards since 2004:

World Rugby Men's 7s Player of the Year
Year	Nominees	Winners
2016	Virimi Vakatawa	—
2024	Antoine Dupont	**Antoine Dupont**
2024	Aaron Grandidier-Nkanang	**Antoine Dupont**

World Rugby Men's 7s Dream Team
Year	No.	Player
2024	2.	Antoine Dupont
2024	3.	Aaron Grandidier-Nkanang
2025	7.	Paulin Riva

World Rugby Coach of the Year
Year	Nominees	Winners
2024	Jérôme Daret	**Jérôme Daret**

== Honours ==
World Rugby Sevens Series

- France Sevens
  - Winners (2): 2005, 2025–26
  - Third-place: 2006, 2016, 2022
- Dubai Sevens
  - Runners-up: 2011
  - Third-place: 2012
  - Cup (fifth place): 2022
- South Africa Sevens
  - Runners-up: 2012
  - Third-place: 2015
- Canada Sevens
  - Runners-up: 2019
  - Third-place: 2024
- Hong Kong Sevens
  - Runners-up: 2019, 2024
  - Third-place: 2022
- USA Sevens
  - Winners: 2024
- Spain Sevens
  - Series Champions: 2024

== See also ==
- France Sevens tournament
