= South Africa at the World Rugby Sevens Series =

South Africa is a regular participant at the World Rugby Sevens Series and has traditionally been a very strong team in rugby sevens.

== Positions ==
=== 1999–2000 ===
Season	(United Arab Emirates) Dubai	(South Africa) Stellenbosch	(Uruguay) Punte del Este	(Argentina) Mar del Plata	(New Zealand) Wellington	(Fiji) Suva	(Australia) Brisbane	Hong Kong	(Japan) Tokyo	(France) Paris	Overall
1999/00	3rd, 4th	3rd, 4th	3rd, 4th	7th, 8th	6th	6th	~~4th~~ (Note: South Africa reached the semi-final stage of the 2000 Brisbane Sevens but was stripped of all points for the tournament due to fielding ineligible players.)	5th, 6th, 7th, 8th	7th, 8th	Runners-up	5th

=== 2000–2001 ===
Season	(South Africa) Durban	(United Arab Emirates) Dubai	(New Zealand) Wellington	Hong Kong	(China) Shangai	(Malaysia) Kuala Lumpur	(Japan) Tokyo	(England) London	(Wales) Cardiff	Overall
2000/01	5th	5th	9th	5th, 6th, 7th, 8th	Runners-up	3rd, 4th	5th	5th	3rd, 4th	5th

=== 2001–2002 ===
Season	(South Africa) Durban	(Chile) Santiago	(Argentina) Mar del Plata	(Australia) Brisbane	(New Zealand) Wellington	(China) Beijing	Hong Kong	Singapore	(Malaysia) Kuala Lumpur	(England) London	(Wales) Cardiff	Overall
2001/02	3rd, 4th	3rd, 4th	Runners-up	3rd, 4th	Champions	Runners-up	9th	9th	Runners-up	Runners-up	5th	5th

=== 2002–2003 ===
Season	(United Arab Emirates) Dubai	(South Africa) George	(Australia) Brisbane	(New Zealand) Wellington	Hong Kong	(Wales) Cardiff	(England) London	Overall
2002/03	3rd, 4th	3rd, 4th	7th, 8th	7th, 8th	3rd, 4th	Champions	3rd, 4th	4th

=== 2003–2004 ===
Season	(United Arab Emirates) Dubai	(South Africa) George	(New Zealand) Wellington	(United States) Los Angeles	Hong Kong	Singapore	(France) Bordeaux	(England) London	Overall
2003/04	~~Champions~~ (Note: South Africa won the 2003 Dubai Sevens but was stripped of all points for the tournament due to fielding an ineligible player Tonderai Chavhanga.)	~~3rd, 4th~~ (Note: South Africa reached the semi-final stage of the 2003 South Africa Sevens but was stripped of all points for the tournament due to fielding an ineligible player Tonderai Chavhanga.)	3rd, 4th	7th, 8th	3rd, 4th	Champions	3rd, 4th	5th	5th

=== 2004–2005 ===
Season	(United Arab Emirates) Dubai	(South Africa) George	(New Zealand) Wellington	(United States) Los Angeles	Singapore	(England) London	(France) Paris	Overall
2004/05	3rd, 4th	5th	3rd, 4th	7th, 8th	3rd, 4th	Champions	5th	5th

=== 2005–2006 ===
Season	(United Arab Emirates) Dubai	(South Africa) George	(New Zealand) Wellington	(United States) Los Angeles	Hong Kong	Singapore	(France) Paris	(England) London	Overall
2005/06	3rd, 4th	3rd, 4th	Runners-up	3rd, 4th	3rd, 4th	3rd, 4th	Champions	5th	Bronze

=== 2006–2009 ===
Season	(United Arab Emirates) Dubai	(South Africa) George	(New Zealand) Wellington	(United States) San Diego	Hong Kong	(Australia) Adelaide	(England) London	(Scotland) Edinburgh	Overall
2006/07	Champions	Runners-up	3rd, 4th	6th	5th	3rd, 4th	5th	7th, 8th	4th
2007/08	3rd, 4th	3rd, 4th	5th	Champions	Runners-up	Runners-up	6th	5th	Runners-up
2008/09	Champions	Champions	5th	Champions	3rd, 4th	Runners-up	3rd, 4th	Runners-up	Champions

=== 2009–2010 ===
Season	(United Arab Emirates) Dubai	(South Africa) George	(New Zealand) Wellington	(United States) Las Vegas	(Australia) Adelaide	Hong Kong	(England) London	(Scotland) Edinburgh	Overall
2009/10	6th	6th	6th	5th	6th	6th	Runners-up	7th, 8th	6th

=== 2010–2011 ===
Season	(United Arab Emirates) Dubai	(South Africa) George	(New Zealand) Wellington	(United States) Las Vegas	Hong Kong	(Australia) Adelaide	(England) London	(Scotland) Edinburgh	Overall
2010/11	5th	5th	6th	Champions	5th	Runners-up	Champions	Champions	Runners-up

=== 2011–2013 ===
Season	(Australia) Gold Coast	(United Arab Emirates) Dubai	(South Africa) Port Elizabeth	(New Zealand) Wellington	(United States) Las Vegas	Hong Kong	(Japan) Tokyo	(Scotland) Glasgow	(England) London	Overall
2011/12	Bronze	6th	Runners-up	5th	4th	Bronze	6th	7th, 8th	7th, 8th	5th
2012/13	Bronze	10th	Bronze	7th, 8th	Champions	11th, 12th	Champions	Champions	7th, 8th	Runners-up

=== 2013–2014 ===
Season	(Australia) Gold Coast	(United Arab Emirates) Dubai	(South Africa) Port Elizabeth	(United States) Las Vegas	(New Zealand) Wellington	(Japan) Tokyo	Hong Kong	(Scotland) Glasgow	(England) London	Overall
2013/14	4th	Runners-up	Champions	Champions	Runners-up	Runners-up	5th	5th	5th	Runners-up

=== 2014–2015 ===
Season	(Australia) Gold Coast	(United Arab Emirates) Dubai	(South Africa) Port Elizabeth	(New Zealand) Wellington	(United States) Las Vegas	Hong Kong	(Japan) Tokyo	(Scotland) Glasgow	(England) London	Overall
2014/15	4th	Champions	Champions	Bronze	Bronze	Bronze	Runners-up	5th	7th, 8th	Runners-up

=== 2015–2017 ===
Season	(United Arab Emirates) Dubai	(South Africa) Cape Town	(New Zealand) Wellington	(Australia) Sydney	(United States) Las Vegas	(Canada) Vancouver	Hong Kong	Singapore	(France) Paris	(England) London	Overall
2015/16	5th	Champions	Runners-up	4th	Bronze	Runners-up	Bronze	Bronze	5th	Runners-up	Runners-up
2016/17	Champions	Runners-up	Champions	Champions	Champions	Runners-up	Runners-up	6th	Champions	5th	Champions

=== 2017–2018 ===
Season	(United Arab Emirates) Dubai	(South Africa) Cape Town	(Australia) Sydney	(New Zealand) Hamilton	(United States) Las Vegas	(Canada) Vancouver	Hong Kong	Singapore	(England) London	(France) Paris	Overall
2017/18	Champions	Bronze	Runners-up	Runners-up	4th	Bronze	Bronze	4th	Runners-up	Champions	Champions

=== 2018–2019 ===
Season	(United Arab Emirates) Dubai	(South Africa) Cape Town	(New Zealand) Hamilton	(Australia) Sydney	(United States) Las Vegas	(Canada) Vancouver	Hong Kong	Singapore	(England) London	(France) Paris	Overall
2018/19	6th	Bronze	4th	5th	7th, 8th	Champions	7th, 8th	Champions	7th, 8th	Bronze	4th

=== 2019–2020 ===
Season	(United Arab Emirates) Dubai	(South Africa) Cape Town	(New Zealand) Hamilton	(Australia) Sydney	(United States) Los Angeles	(Canada) Vancouver	Overall
2019/20	Champions	Runners-up	10th	Runners-up	Champions	4th	Runners-up

=== 2021 ===
Season	(Canada) Vancouver	(Canada) Edmonton	Overall
2021	Champions	Champions	Champions

=== 2021–2022 ===
Season	(United Arab Emirates) Dubai I	(United Arab Emirates) Dubai II	(Spain) Málaga	(Spain) Seville	Singapore	(Canada) Vancouver	(France) Toulouse	(England) London	(United States) Los Angeles	Overall
2021/22	Champions	Champions	Champions	Champions	7th, 8th	5th	11th, 12th	5th	13th	Runners-up

=== 2022–2023 ===
Season	Hong Kong I	(United Arab Emirates) Dubai	(South Africa) Cape Town	(New Zealand) Hamilton	(Australia) Sydney	(United States) Los Angeles	(Canada) Vancouver	Hong Kong II	Singapore	(France) Toulouse	(England) London	Overall
2022/23	7th, 8th	Champions	4th	7th, 8th	Runners-up	7th, 8th	14th	6th	11th, 12th	7th, 8th	9th	7th

=== 2023–2024 Series ===
Season	(United Arab Emirates) Dubai	(South Africa) Cape Town	(Australia) Perth	(Canada) Vancouver	(United States) Los Angeles	Hong Kong	Singapore	Overall
2023/24	Champions	6th	5th	9th	11th	6th	6th	7th

=== 2023–2024 Grand Final ===
Season	(Spain) Madrid	Overall
2024	6th	6th

=== 2024–2025 Series ===
Season	(United Arab Emirates) Dubai	(South Africa) Cape Town	(Australia) Perth	(Canada) Vancouver	Hong Kong	Singapore	Overall
2024/25	6th	Champions	4th	Runners-up	9th	9th	4th

=== 2024–2025 Grand Final ===
Season	(United States) Los Angeles	Overall
2025	Champions	Champions

=== 2025–2026 Series ===
Season	(United Arab Emirates) Dubai	(South Africa) Cape Town	Singapore	(Australia) Perth	(Canada) Vancouver	(United States) New York	Overall
2025/26	5th	Champions	4th	Champions	Champions	Champions	Champions

=== 2025–2026 Grand Final ===
Season	Hong Kong	(Spain) Valladolid	(France) Bordeaux	Overall
2025/26	Champions	Runners-up	4th	Champions

== Facts ==
- South Africa have won the SVNS series 5 times, with those seasons being 2008–09, 2016–17, 2017–18, 2021 and 2025–26
- South Africa have been Grand Final winners 2 times, whith those being 2025 and 2026
- South Africa's highest podium streak was 8 and streched from the 2016 London Sevens to the 2017 Hong Kong Sevens.
- South Africa's worst overall placing in the SVNS was 7th in 2022–23 and 2023–24
- South Africa's longest defending champions streak in a single tournament was five consecutive titles at the Dubai Sevens from 2019 to 2024, the most successful run in the team’s history at a single tournament.
- South Africa's worst performance in a tournament was at the 2022 Los Angeles Sevens and then again at the 2023 Vancouver Sevens where they finished 13th.
