= 2021 Canada Sevens =

Rugby Sevens tournaments hosted in Canada

- Sevens World Series XXII
- Host nation: Canada

Vancouver
- Date: 18–19 September 2021
- Champion: South Africa
- Runner-up: Kenya
- Third: Great Britain

Tournament details
- Matches played: 34
- Tries scored: 214 (average 6.29 per match)
- Most points: (Germany) Bastian van der Bosch (51)
- Most tries: (South Africa) Angelo Davids (10)

Edmonton
- Date: 25–26 September 2021
- Champion: South Africa
- Runner-up: Great Britain
- Third: Kenya

Tournament details
- Matches played: 34
- Tries scored: 218 (average 6.41 per match)
- Most points: (South Africa) Muller du Plessis (55)
- Most tries: (South Africa) Muller du Plessis (11)

The 2021 Canada Sevens was held as two rugby sevens tournaments on consecutive weekends in late September that year. The first was hosted at BC Place in Vancouver and the second at Commonwealth Stadium in Edmonton. These events were played as the sixth season of the Canada Sevens. They were the only stops on the 2021 World Rugby Sevens Series, following the cancellation of all other planned tournaments due to impacts of the COVID-19 pandemic.

== Format ==
The twelve teams at each tournament were drawn into three pools of four teams. A round-robin was held for each pool, where each team played the others in their pool once. The top two teams from each pool, plus the two best third-placed on comparative pool standings, advanced to the Cup quarterfinals to compete for tournament honours. The other teams from each pool went to the challenge playoffs for ninth to twelfth place.

== Teams ==
The national men's teams competing at the Vancouver and Edmonton tournaments were:

- Canada
- Chile
- Germany
- Great Britain
- Hong Kong
- Ireland
- Jamaica
- Kenya
- Mexico
- South Africa
- Spain
- United States

== Vancouver ==
The first tournament of the 2021 Canada Sevens was hosted at BC Place in Vancouver on 18–19 September 2021. South Africa won the tournament, defeating Kenya by 38–5 in the final, to take the maximum 20 points in the series standings leading into the second tournament in Edmonton.

All times in Pacific Daylight Time (UTC−07:00). The pools were scheduled as follows:

Key: Team advanced to the quarterfinals

=== Pool A ===
Pos	Team	Pld	W	D	L	PF	PA	PD	Pts
1	South Africa	3	3	0	0	120	21	+99	9
2	Kenya	3	2	0	1	76	45	+31	7
3	Spain	3	1	0	2	71	51	+20	5
4	Mexico	3	0	0	3	7	157	−150	3

18 September 2021
10:31

Kenya	17–5	Spain
	Report

BC Place, Vancouver

18 September 2021
10:53

South Africa	53–0	Mexico
	Report

BC Place, Vancouver

18 September 2021
13:42

Kenya	45–7	Mexico
	Report

BC Place, Vancouver

18 September 2021
14:04

South Africa	34–7	Spain
	Report

BC Place, Vancouver

18 September 2021
17:07

Spain	59–0	Mexico
	Report

BC Place, Vancouver

18 September 2021
17:35

South Africa	33–14	Kenya
	Report

BC Place, Vancouver

=== Pool B ===
Pos	Team	Pld	W	D	L	PF	PA	PD	Pts
1	Ireland	3	2	1	0	74	21	+53	8
2	Great Britain	3	2	1	0	62	17	+45	8
3	Hong Kong	3	1	0	2	81	48	+33	5
4	Jamaica	3	0	0	3	5	136	−131	3

18 September 2021
09:44

Ireland	17–14	Hong Kong
	Report

BC Place, Vancouver

18 September 2021
10:06

Great Britain	24–5	Jamaica
	Report

BC Place, Vancouver

18 September 2021
12:55

Ireland	50–0	Jamaica
	Report

BC Place, Vancouver

18 September 2021
13:17

Great Britain	31–5	Hong Kong
	Report

BC Place, Vancouver

18 September 2021
16:06

Hong Kong	62–0	Jamaica
	Report

BC Place, Vancouver

18 September 2021
16:28

Great Britain	7–7	Ireland
	Report

BC Place, Vancouver

=== Pool C ===
Pos	Team	Pld	W	D	L	PF	PA	PD	Pts
1	United States	3	3	0	0	88	31	+57	9
2	Canada	3	2	0	1	62	48	+14	7
3	Germany	3	1	0	2	48	62	−14	5
4	Chile	3	0	0	3	31	88	−57	3

18 September 2021
11:15

Canada	24–5	Germany
	Report

BC Place, Vancouver

18 September 2021
11:37

United States	33–5	Chile
	Report

BC Place, Vancouver

18 September 2021
14:26

Canada	19–14	Chile
	Report

BC Place, Vancouver

18 September 2021
14:48

United States	26–7	Germany
	Report

BC Place, Vancouver

18 September 2021
18:05

Germany	36–12	Chile
	Report

BC Place, Vancouver

18 September 2021
18:33

United States	29–19	Canada
	Report

BC Place, Vancouver

=== 9th to 12th playoffs ===
9th place semifinals
19 Sep – 10:58 – BC Place
Chile	5
Jamaica	10
19 Sep – 11:20 – BC Place
Germany	41
Mexico	0

9th place final
19 Sep – 14:36 – BC Place
Jamaica	0
Germany	66
11th place final
19 Sep – 14:14 – BC Place
Chile	34
Mexico	0

Matches

9th place semifinals

19 September 2021
10:58

Chile	5–10	Jamaica
	Report

BC Place, Vancouver

19 September 2021
11:20

Germany	41–0	Mexico
	Report

BC Place, Vancouver

11th place final

19 September 2021
14:14

Chile	34–0	Mexico
	Report

BC Place, Vancouver

9th place final

19 September 2021
14:36

Jamaica	0–66	Germany
	Report

BC Place, Vancouver

=== 5th to 8th playoffs ===
5th place semifinals
19 Sep – 12:36 – BC Place
Hong Kong	10
United States	24
19 Sep – 12:58 – BC Place
Canada	33
Spain	19

5th place final
19 Sep – 16:07 – BC Place
United States	26
Canada	7
7th place final
19 Sep – 15:20 – BC Place
Hong Kong	19
Spain	7

Matches

5th place semifinals

19 September 2021
12:36

Hong Kong	10–24	United States
	Report

BC Place, Vancouver

19 September 2021
12:58

Canada	33–19	Spain
	Report

BC Place, Vancouver

7th place final

19 September 2021
15:20

Hong Kong	19–7	Spain
	Report

BC Place, Vancouver

5th place final

19 September 2021
16:07

United States	26–7	Canada
	Report

BC Place, Vancouver

=== Cup playoffs ===
Quarterfinals
19 Sep – 09:20 – BC Place
Ireland	12
Hong Kong	7
19 Sep – 09:42 – BC Place
United States	14
Kenya	19
19 Sep – 10:04 – BC Place
Great Britain	31
Canada	5
19 Sep – 10:26 – BC Place
South Africa	54
Spain	5

Semifinals
19 Sep – 13:20 – BC Place
Ireland	5
Kenya	38
19 Sep – 13:42 – BC Place
Great Britain	12
South Africa	26

Final
19 Sep – 17:28 – BC Place
Kenya	5
South Africa	38
3rd place final
19 Sep – 16:31 – BC Place
Ireland	14
Great Britain	24

Matches

Quarterfinals

19 September 2021
09:20

Ireland	12–7	Hong Kong
	Report

BC Place, Vancouver

19 September 2021
09:42

United States	14–19	Kenya
	Report

BC Place, Vancouver

19 September 2021
10:04

Great Britain	31–5	Canada
	Report

BC Place, Vancouver

19 September 2021
10:26

South Africa	54–5	Spain
	Report

BC Place, Vancouver

Semifinals

19 September 2021
13:20

Ireland	5–38	Kenya
	Report

BC Place, Vancouver

19 September 2021
13:42

Great Britain	12–26	South Africa
	Report

BC Place, Vancouver

3rd place final

19 September 2021
16:31

Ireland	14–24	Great Britain
	Report

BC Place, Vancouver

Final

19 September 2021
17:28

Kenya	5–38	South Africa
	Report

BC Place, Vancouver

=== Tournament placings ===
Place	Team	Points
1st place, gold medalist(s)	South Africa	20
2nd place, silver medalist(s)	Kenya	18
3rd place, bronze medalist(s)	Great Britain	16
4	Ireland	14
5	United States	12
6	Canada	10

Place	Team	Points
7	Hong Kong	8
8	Spain	6
9	Germany	4
10	Jamaica	3
11	Chile	2
12	Mexico	1

Source: World Rugby

== Edmonton ==
The second tournament of the 2021 Canada Sevens was hosted at Commonwealth Stadium in Edmonton on 25–26 September. South Africa won the tournament, defeating Great Britain by 24–12 in the final, to take the maximum 40 points in the series standings and win their 4th World Rugby Sevens Series title.

All times in Mountain Daylight Time (UTC−06:00). The pools were scheduled as follows:

Key: Team advanced to the quarterfinals

=== Pool A ===
Pos	Team	Pld	W	D	L	PF	PA	PD	Pts
1	South Africa	3	3	0	0	148	5	+143	9
2	Canada	3	2	0	1	68	61	+7	7
3	Hong Kong	3	1	0	2	87	64	+23	5
4	Mexico	3	0	0	3	0	173	−173	3

25 September 2021
11:15

Canada	21–12	Hong Kong
	Report

Commonwealth Stadium, Edmonton

25 September 2021
11:37

South Africa	56–0	Mexico
	Report

Commonwealth Stadium, Edmonton

25 September 2021
14:26

Canada	47–0	Mexico
	Report

Commonwealth Stadium, Edmonton

25 September 2021
14:48

South Africa	43–5	Hong Kong
	Report

Commonwealth Stadium, Edmonton

25 September 2021
18:05

Hong Kong	70–0	Mexico
	Report

Commonwealth Stadium, Edmonton

25 September 2021
18:33

South Africa	49–0	Canada
	Report

Commonwealth Stadium, Edmonton

=== Pool B ===
Pos	Team	Pld	W	D	L	PF	PA	PD	Pts
1	United States	3	3	0	0	81	36	+45	9
2	Kenya	3	2	0	1	78	36	+42	7
3	Spain	3	1	0	2	69	74	−5	5
4	Chile	3	0	0	3	29	111	−82	3

25 September 2021
10:31

United States	29–17	Spain
	Report

Commonwealth Stadium, Edmonton

25 September 2021
10:53

Kenya	38–5	Chile
	Report

Commonwealth Stadium, Edmonton

25 September 2021
13:42

United States	33–5	Chile
	Report

Commonwealth Stadium, Edmonton

25 September 2021
14:04

Kenya	26–12	Spain
	Report

Commonwealth Stadium, Edmonton

25 September 2021
17:07

Spain	40–19	Chile
	Report

Commonwealth Stadium, Edmonton

25 September 2021
17:35

Kenya	14–19	United States
	Report

Commonwealth Stadium, Edmonton

=== Pool C ===
Pos	Team	Pld	W	D	L	PF	PA	PD	Pts
1	Ireland	3	2	1	0	69	36	+33	8
2	Germany	3	2	0	1	91	34	+57	7
3	Great Britain	3	1	1	1	70	31	+39	6
4	Jamaica	3	0	0	3	12	141	−129	3

25 September 2021
09:44

Ireland	19–17	Germany
	Report

Commonwealth Stadium, Edmonton

25 September 2021
10:06

Great Britain	48–0	Jamaica
	Report

Commonwealth Stadium, Edmonton

25 September 2021
12:55

Ireland	38–7	Jamaica
	Report

Commonwealth Stadium, Edmonton

25 September 2021
13:17

Great Britain	10–19	Germany
	Report

Commonwealth Stadium, Edmonton

25 September 2021
16:06

Germany	55–5	Jamaica
	Report

Commonwealth Stadium, Edmonton

25 September 2021
16:28

Great Britain	12–12	Ireland
	Report

Commonwealth Stadium, Edmonton

=== 9th to 12th playoffs ===
9th place semifinals
26 Sep – 10:58 – Commonwealth Stadium
Chile	29
Jamaica	7
26 Sep – 11:20 – Commonwealth Stadium
Spain	40
Mexico	0

9th place final
26 Sep – 14:36 – Commonwealth Stadium
Chile	12
Spain	29
11th place final
26 Sep – 14:14 – Commonwealth Stadium
Jamaica	28
Mexico	10

Matches

9th place semifinals

26 September 2021
10:58

Chile	29–7	Jamaica
	Report

Commonwealth Stadium, Edmonton

26 September 2021
11:20

Spain	40–0	Mexico
	Report

Commonwealth Stadium, Edmonton

11th place final

26 September 2021
14:14

Jamaica	28–10	Mexico
	Report

Commonwealth Stadium, Edmonton

9th place final

26 September 2021
14:36

Chile	12–29	Spain
	Report

Commonwealth Stadium, Edmonton

=== 5th to 8th playoffs ===
5th place semifinals
26 Sep – 12:36 – Commonwealth Stadium
United States	19
Ireland	0
26 Sep – 12:58 – Commonwealth Stadium
Germany	21
Hong Kong	7

5th place final
26 Sep – 16:07 – Commonwealth Stadium
United States	19
Germany	^{^{(a.e.t.)}}_{24}
7th place final
26 Sep – 15:20 – Commonwealth Stadium
Ireland	14
Hong Kong	21

Matches

5th place semifinals

26 September 2021
12:36

United States	19–0	Ireland
	Report

Commonwealth Stadium, Edmonton

26 September 2021
12:58

Germany	21–7	Hong Kong
	Report

Commonwealth Stadium, Edmonton

7th place final

26 September 2021
15:20

Ireland	14–21	Hong Kong
	Report

Commonwealth Stadium, Edmonton

5th place final

26 September 2021
16:07

United States	19–24 (a.e.t.)	Germany
	Report

Commonwealth Stadium, Edmonton

=== Cup playoffs ===
Quarterfinals
26 Sep – 09:20 – Commonwealth Stadium
United States	19
Great Britain	21
26 Sep – 09:42 – Commonwealth Stadium
Ireland	12
Canada	14
26 Sep – 10:04 – Commonwealth Stadium
Kenya	24
Germany	17
26 Sep – 10:26 – Commonwealth Stadium
South Africa	46
Hong Kong	0

Semifinals
26 Sep – 13:20 – Commonwealth Stadium
Great Britain	22
Canada	12
26 Sep – 13:42 – Commonwealth Stadium
Kenya	7
South Africa	33

Final
26 Sep – 17:28 – Commonwealth Stadium
Great Britain	12
South Africa	24
3rd place final
26 Sep – 16:31 – Commonwealth Stadium
Canada	14
Kenya	33

Matches

Quarterfinals

26 September 2021
09:20

United States	19–21	Great Britain
	Report

Commonwealth Stadium, Edmonton

26 September 2021
09:42

Ireland	12–14	Canada
	Report

Commonwealth Stadium, Edmonton

26 September 2021
10:04

Kenya	24–17	Germany
	Report

Commonwealth Stadium, Edmonton

26 September 2021
10:26

South Africa	46–0	Hong Kong
	Report

Commonwealth Stadium, Edmonton

Semifinals

26 September 2021
13:20

Great Britain	22–12	Canada
	Report

Commonwealth Stadium, Edmonton

26 September 2021
13:42

Kenya	7–33	South Africa
	Report

Commonwealth Stadium, Edmonton

3rd place final

26 September 2021
16:31

Canada	14–33	Kenya
	Report

Commonwealth Stadium, Edmonton

Final

26 September 2021
17:28

Great Britain	12–24	South Africa
	Report

Commonwealth Stadium, Edmonton

=== Tournament placings ===
Place	Team	Points
1st place, gold medalist(s)	South Africa	20
2nd place, silver medalist(s)	Great Britain	18
3rd place, bronze medalist(s)	Kenya	16
4	Canada	14
5	Germany	12
6	United States	10

Place	Team	Points
7	Hong Kong	8
8	Ireland	6
9	Spain	4
10	Chile	3
11	Jamaica	2
12	Mexico	1

Source: World Rugby

== See also ==
- 2021 Canada Women's Sevens (Fast Four)

Canada Sevens
Preceded by 2020 Canada Sevens	2021 Canada Sevens	Succeeded by 2022 Canada Sevens
