= 2021 World Rugby Sevens Series =

22nd annual international series of tournaments in men's rugby sevens

2021 World Rugby Sevens
- Series XXII
- Hosts: Canada(2 events)
- Date: 18–26 September 2021
- Nations: 12

Final positions
- Champions: South Africa
- Runners-up: Great Britain
- Third: Kenya

Series details
- Top try scorer: Muller du Plessis (13)
- Top point scorer: Ronald Brown (91)

The 2021 World Rugby Sevens Series was the 22nd annual series of rugby sevens tournaments for national men's rugby sevens teams. The Sevens Series has been run by World Rugby since 1999. Due to the impact of the COVID-19 pandemic, only two tournaments were played in the 2021 series instead of the usual ten. The number of teams participating was also reduced from sixteen to twelve at the tournaments, with many of the top teams from the previous series not taking part.

The series was won by South Africa who won both tour events on their way to claiming their fourth World Series title.

== Teams ==
The twelve national men's teams competing in the 2021 series were:

- Canada
- Chile
- Germany
- Great Britain
- Hong Kong
- Ireland
- Jamaica
- Kenya
- Mexico
- South Africa
- Spain
- United States

Core teams qualified from the previous season and not competing in 2021 were:

- Argentina, Australia, Fiji, France, Japan, New Zealand and Samoa, who did not travel due to the impact of the COVID-19 pandemic. (Note: Due to impacts of the COVID-19 pandemic, 2019–20 champion team New Zealand, Olympic gold medallist Fiji, as well as Australia, Argentina, and Samoa did not compete in the 2021 series, and neither did Japan, the team promoted to core status from the 2020 Challenger Series, or France, a late withdrawal due to travel issues.)
- England, Scotland and Wales did not take part, being represented instead by Great Britain. (Note: Great Britain represented England, Scotland and Wales during the 2021 World Rugby Sevens Series, following their appearance as Team GB at the Olympic Sevens earlier in the year.)

As a result, five teams from the Challenger Series were invited to both events to complete a 12-team field. Hong Kong, Germany and Chile were in the top four of the 2020 Series, while Jamaica and Mexico were the only North American entrants.

== Tour venues ==
The official schedule for the 2021 World Rugby Sevens Series was:

2021 Itinerary
Leg	Stadium	City	Dates	Winner
Vancouver	BC Place	Vancouver	18–19 September 2021	South Africa
Edmonton	Commonwealth Stadium	Edmonton	25–26 September 2021	South Africa

On 4 August organisers announced the cancellation of the Hong Kong Sevens for the second year running because of the emerging Covid-19 Delta variant and global travel restrictions.

On 3 September, World Rugby cancelled the Singapore and Cape Town tournaments due to ongoing impacts of the COVID-19 pandemic, and announced that the 2021 Dubai Sevens tournament would no longer be part of the 2021 series but incorporated into the 2021-22 series instead. This reduced the 2021 series to just two events held in Canada.

== Standings ==
The final standings after completion of the two tournaments of the series are shown in the table below.

The points awarded to teams at each tournament, as well as the overall season totals, are shown. Gold indicates the event champions. Silver indicates the event runner-ups. Bronze indicates the event third place finishers.

Official standings for the 2021 series were:

2021 World Rugby Sevens – Series XXI
Pos.	Event Team	Vancouver	Edmonton	Points total	Points difference
1	South Africa	20	20	40	+422
2	Great Britain	16	18	34	+106
3	Kenya	18	16	34	+78
4	Canada	10	14	24	–37
5	United States	12	10	22	+142
6	Ireland	14	6	20	+20
7	Germany	4	12	16	+162
8	Hong Kong	8	8	16	–4
9	Spain	6	4	10	–3
10	Chile	2	3	5	–105
11	Jamaica	3	2	5	–325
12	Mexico	1	1	2	–456

Legend
Event Medalists
Gold	Event Champions
Silver	Event Runner-ups
Bronze	Event Third place finishers
Qualification for the 2020–21 World Rugby Sevens Series
No colour	Originally qualified as a core team for the 2020–21 World Rugby Sevens Series
Yellow	Invited team

Source: World Rugby

== Players ==
=== Squads ===
This is a list of the complete squads for the 2021 World Rugby Sevens Series.

Legend
Gold	Indicates the captains for a tournament
–	Indicates that a player did not play in the tournament

==== Canada ====
Head Coach: (New Zealand) Henry Paul

Canada team members 2021
Player	Jersey number by tournament	
Player	Vancouver	Edmonton
Nicolas Allen	4	4
Phil Berna	1	1
Ciaran Breen	6	6
Jack Carson	7	13
Andrew Coe	11	11
Elias Ergas	13	–
Josiah Morra	10	10
Anton Ngongo	13	7
Matt Oworu	3	3
Matthew Percillier	8	8
Brenning Prevost	9	9
Alex Russell	5	5
Jake Thiel	2	2
Thomas Isherwood	–	12

==== Chile ====
Head Coach: (Chile) Edmundo Olfos

Chile team members 2021
Player	Jersey number by tournament	
Player	Vancouver	Edmonton
Jose Alcerreca	4	3
Juan Bascuñan	6	6
Sebastian Berti	5	9
Julio Blanc	11	11
Felipe Brangier	1	1
Santiago Edwards	7	7
Joaquin Huici	10	10
Arturo Iriarte	13	13
Dante Marchese	8	8
Giorgio Moltedo	12	12
Agustín Planella	3	4
Luca Strabucchi	2	2
Diego Warnken	9	5

==== Germany ====
Head Coach: (England) Damian McGrath

Germany team members 2021
Player	Jersey number by tournament	
Player	Vancouver	Edmonton
Anjo Buckman	1	1
Marcel Coetzee	6	2
John Dawe	3	3
Ben Ellermann	8	8
Niklas Koch	4	4
Tim Lichtenberg	12	12
Robin Pluempe	10	10
Samuel Rainger	5	5
Manasah Sita	11	11
Carlos Soteras Merz	7	7
Phil Szczesny	9	9
Chris Umeh	13	13
Bastian van der Bosch	2	–
Fabian Heimpel	–	6

==== Great Britain ====
Head coach: (England) Tony Roques

Great Britain team members 2021
Player	Jersey number by tournament	
Player	Vancouver	Edmonton
Jamie Barden	9	9
Tom Bowen	8	8
Alex Davis	3	3
Tom Emery	2	2
Jamie Farndale	5	5
Robbie Fergusson	6	6
Paddy Kelly	11	11
Ross McCann	10	10
Max McFarland	12	12
Calum Randle	7	7
Freddie Roddick	13	13
Luke Treharne	1	1
Morgan Williams	4	4

==== Hong Kong ====
Head Coach: (Wales) Paul John

Hong Kong team members 2021
Player	Jersey number by tournament	
Player	Vancouver	Edmonton
Seb Brien	11	11
James Christie	9	9
Michael Coverdale	3	3
Max Denmark	8	8
Liam Herbert	12	12
Jamie Hood	5	5
Cado Lee	6	6
Pierce MacKinlay-West	13	13
Callum McCullough	2	2
Harry Sayers	4	4
Hugo Stiles	10	10
Russell Webb	7	7
Max Woodward	1	1

==== Ireland ====
Head Coach: (Australia) Anthony Eddy

Ireland team members 2021
Player	Jersey number by tournament	
Player	Vancouver	Edmonton
Niall Comerford	7	9
Chris Cosgrave	13	13
Sean Cribbin	8	8
Shane Jennings	5	5
Sean Kearns	11	11
Ed Kelly	10	–
Steven Kilgallen	6	10
Bryan Mollen	4	4
Ben Moxham	1	1
Gavin Mullin	12	–
Conor Phillips	3	3
Mark Roche	9	–
Liam Turner	2	2
Jordan Conroy	–	7
Billy Dardis	–	6
Aaron O'Sullivan	–	12

==== Jamaica ====
Head Coach: (England) Hughton Campbell

Jamaica team members 2021
Player	Jersey number by tournament	
Player	Vancouver	Edmonton
Nathan Annakie	8	8
Anthony Bingham	10	–
Oshane Edie	9	9
Nic Franklyn	4	4
Josh Jacas	1	1
Ben Jones-Bishop	12	12
Conan Osborne	6	–
Mark Phillips	13	13
Jack Rampton	3	3
Samuel Rees	2	–
Lucas Roy-Smith	5	5
Ashley Smith	11	11
Fabian Turner	7	7
Mason Caton-Brown	–	2
Matthew Coore	–	6
Oliver Melville	–	10

==== Kenya ====
Head Coach: (Kenya) Innocent Simiyu

Kenya team members 2021
Player	Jersey number by tournament	
Player	Vancouver	Edmonton
Willy Ambaka	12	12
Levy Amunga	4	4
Harold Anduvate	2	2
Herman Humwa	8	8
Derrick Keyoga	11	11
Mark Kwemoi	10	10
Alvin Marube	13	13
Timothy Mmasi	7	7
Billy Odhiambo	5	5
Jeff Oluoch	6	6
Alvin Otieno	3	3
Nelson Oyoo	9	9
Daniel Taabu	1	1

==== Mexico ====
Head Coach: (Spain) Rubén Duque

Mexico team members 2021
Player	Jersey number by tournament	
Player	Vancouver	Edmonton
Ricardo Ancira	2	2
Raúl Barrón García	8	–
Enrique Carmona	13	12
Nicolas Falcon	3	3
Patricio Falcón	4	4
David Hernández Núñez	1	1
Luc Martin	6	6
José Lárraga Martínez	9	9
Fernando Medoza	5	5
Alejandro Revilla Beltrán	10	10
José Velasco Pons	11	11
Mike Villalobos	7	7
Erik Castillo	–	8

==== South Africa ====
Head Coach: (South Africa) Neil Powell

South Africa team members 2021
Player	Jersey number by tournament	
Player	Vancouver	Edmonton
Darren Adonis	9	9
Ronald Brown	7	7
Angelo Davids	5	–
Zain Davids	4	4
Muller du Plessis	12	12
Christie Grobbelaar	1	1
Dewald Human	10	10
Sako Makata	3	3
James Murphy	13	13
Ryan Oosthuizen	2	2
JC Pretorius	6	6
Siviwe Soyizwapi	11	11
Shaun Williams	8	5
Selvyn Davids	–	8

==== Spain ====
Head Coach: (Spain) Pablo Feijoo

Spain team members 2021
Player	Jersey number by tournament	
Player	Vancouver	Edmonton
Pau Aira	2	2
Arnau Andres	10	10
Enrique Bolinches	3	3
Emilien Cabale	9	9
Alberto Carmona	12	12
Juan Martínez	8	8
Jaime Mata	6	6
Manu Moreno	5	5
Pol Pla	7	7
Miguel Reina	4	4
Josep Serres	11	11
Mana Williams	1	1

==== United States ====
Head Coach: (England) Mike Friday

United States team members 2021
Player	Jersey number by tournament	
Player	Vancouver	Edmonton
Adam Channel	9	9
Gavan D'Amore	3	3
Christian Dyer	9	9
Malacchi Esdale	11	11
Naima Fuala'au	7	7
Martin Iosefo	12	12
Matai Leuta	4	4
Cody Melphy	10	–
Jerome Nale	13	13
Joe Schroeder	5	5
David Still	8	8
Jack Wendling	1	1
Kevon Williams	6	6
Fasitupe Tupuola	–	10

=== Scoring leaders ===
Tries scored
Rank	Player	Tries
1	Muller du Plessis	13
2	Malacchi Esdale	12
2	Max McFarland	12
4	Alvin Otieno	11
4	Siviwe Soyizwapi	11

Updated: 27 September 2021

Points scored
Rank	Player	Points
1	Ronald Brown	91
2	Muller du Plessis	65
3	Diego Warnken	64
4	Brennig Prevost	62
5	Malacchi Esdale	60
5	Max McFarland	60

Updated: 27 September 2021

== Tournaments ==
=== Vancouver ===
Event	Winner	Score	Finalist
Cup	South Africa	38–5	Kenya
Bronze	Great Britain	24–14	Ireland
5th Place	United States	26–7	Canada
7th Place	Hong Kong	19–7	Spain
9th Place	Germany	66–0	Jamaica
11th Place	Chile	34–0	Mexico

=== Edmonton ===
Event	Winner	Score	Finalist
Cup	South Africa	24–12	Great Britain
Bronze	Kenya	33–14	Canada
5th Place	Germany	24–19 (a.e.t.)	United States
7th Place	Hong Kong	21–14	Ireland
9th Place	Spain	29–12	Chile
11th Place	Jamaica	28–10	Mexico

== See also ==
- 2021 World Rugby Women's Sevens Series
- Rugby sevens at the 2020 Summer Olympics
