= Canada Sevens =

Rugby sevens tournament

- Current season, competition or edition: 2026 Canada Sevens
- Sport: Rugby sevens
- First season: 2016 (Vancouver Sevens)
- No. of teams: 12
- Most recent champion: South Africa (2026)
- Most titles: Argentina/South Africa (4 titles)
- Website: https://vansevens.com/

The Canada Sevens is an annual rugby sevens tournament held every March. It is one of the stops on the World Rugby Sevens Series, and is played the weekend after the USA Sevens. Canada secured a four-year deal to host to event from the 2015–16 season. The tournament is played at BC Place in Vancouver.

== Event winners ==
Year	Venue	Cup final			Placings			Refs
		Winner	Score	Runner-up	Plate	Bowl	Shield	
2016	BC Place	New Zealand	19–14	South Africa	Samoa	Canada	Russia	
		Winner	Score	Runner-up	Third	Fourth	Fifth	
2017	BC Place	England	19–7	South Africa	Fiji	United States	New Zealand	
2018	BC Place	Fiji	31–12	Kenya	South Africa	United States	England	
2019	BC Place	South Africa	21–12	France	Fiji	United States	New Zealand	
2020	BC Place	New Zealand	17–14	Australia	Canada	South Africa	England	
2021 I	BC Place	South Africa	38–5	Kenya	Great Britain	Ireland	United States	
2021 II	Commonwealth Stadium	South Africa	24–12	Great Britain	Kenya	Canada	Germany	
2022	BC Place	Argentina	29–10	Fiji	Australia	Samoa	South Africa	
2023	BC Place	Argentina	33–21	France	Australia	Ireland	New Zealand	
2024	BC Place	Argentina	36–12	New Zealand	France	United States	Ireland	
2025	BC Place	Argentina	19–12	South Africa	Spain	Fiji	Great Britain	
2026	BC Place	South Africa	38–12	Spain	Fiji	Australia	Argentina	

== Attendance ==
Tournament attendance by year
Year	Total Attendance	Average attendance	Highest day	Tournament days	Ref.
2016	60,418	30,209		2	
2017	76,116	38,058		2	
2018	78,096	39,048		2	
2019	73,819	36,910		2	
2020	74,560	37,280	39,553	2	
2021 I	23,317	11,659		2	
2021 II	8,314	4,157		2	
2022	33,444	16,722		2	
2023	66,700	22,233		3	
2024	67,753	22,584		3	
2025	58,664	19,555		3	
2026	42,514	21,257		2	

Key
	Record high
	Record low
*	Attendance figures affected by the COVID-19 pandemic

== See also ==
- Canada Women's Sevens
