= 2021 Canada Women's Sevens =

Rugby Sevens tournaments for national women's teams hosted in Canada

- Host nation: Canada

Vancouver
- Date: 18–19 September 2021
- Champion: Great Britain
- Runner-up: United States
- Third: Canada

Tournament details
- Matches played: 10

Edmonton
- Date: 25–26 September 2021
- Champion: Great Britain
- Runner-up: United States
- Third: Canada

Tournament details
- Matches played: 10

The 2021 Canada Women's Sevens was held as two "Fast Four" invitational rugby sevens events on consecutive weekends in late September that year. The first was hosted at BC Place in Vancouver and the second at Commonwealth Stadium in Edmonton. These tournaments, which featured four national women's teams, were played as the sixth season of the Canada Women's Sevens but were not part of the cancelled 2021 World Rugby Women's Sevens Series. All official tournaments on the women's world circuit for the season were cancelled, including the Canada Women's Sevens tournament for twelve teams originally planned for Langford during the spring, due to impacts of the COVID-19 pandemic.

== Format ==
All national women's teams played four matches at each Fast Four event. Three matches within a round-robin format were followed by a final playoff match. The top two teams met in the gold medal match, with the bottom two playing for bronze. The women's final matches were played directly before the men's final to complete the second day of competition at the 2021 Canada Sevens tournaments.

== Teams ==
The national women's teams competing at the Vancouver and Edmonton invitational Fast Four tournaments were:

- Canada
- Great Britain
- Mexico
- United States

== Vancouver ==
The first tournament was hosted at BC Place in Vancouver on 18–19 September 2021. Great Britain won the Fast Four event, defeating United States by 34–12 in the final.

All times in Pacific Daylight Time (UTC−07:00).

Key: Top seeded semifinalists are highlighted in green

=== Round robin ===
Pos	Team	Pld	W	D	L	PF	PA	PD	Pts
1	Great Britain	3	3	0	0	99	17	+82	9
2	United States	3	2	0	1	125	24	+101	7
3	Canada	3	1	0	2	70	27	+43	5
4	Mexico	3	0	0	3	0	140	-140	3

18 September 2021
09:00

United States	22–12	Canada
	Report

BC Place, Vancouver

18 September 2021
09:22

Great Britain	39–0	Mexico
	Report

BC Place, Vancouver

18 September 2021
12:11

United States	62–0	Mexico
	Report

BC Place, Vancouver

18 September 2021
12:33

Great Britain	19–5	Canada
	Report

BC Place, Vancouver

18 September 2021
15:22

Canada	39–0	Mexico
	Report

BC Place, Vancouver

18 September 2021
15:44

Great Britain	41–12	United States
	Report

BC Place, Vancouver

=== Playoffs ===
Semifinals
19 Sep – 11:42 – BC Place
Great Britain	43
Mexico	0
19 Sep – 12:04 – BC Place
United States	22
Canada	12

Final
19 Sep – 16:56 – BC Place
Great Britain	34
United States	12
3rd place final
19 Sep – 14:58 – BC Place
Mexico	0
Canada	48

Matches

Semifinals

19 September 2021
11:42

Great Britain	43–0	Mexico
	Report

BC Place, Vancouver

19 September 2021
12:04

United States	22–12	Canada
	Report

BC Place, Vancouver

3rd place final

19 September 2021
14:58

Mexico	0–48	Canada
	Report

BC Place, Vancouver

Final

19 September 2021
16:56

Great Britain	34–12	United States
	Report

BC Place, Vancouver

=== Tournament placings ===
Place	Team
1	Great Britain
2	United States
3	Canada
4	Mexico

== Edmonton ==
The second tournament was hosted at Commonwealth Stadium in Edmonton on 25–26 September. Great Britain won the Fast Four event, defeating United States by 22–5 in the final.

All times in Mountain Daylight Time (UTC−06:00).

Key: Top seeded semifinalists are highlighted in green

=== Round robin ===
Pos	Team	Pld	W	D	L	PF	PA	PD	Pts
1	Great Britain	3	2	1	0	79	26	+53	8
2	Canada	3	1	2	0	73	45	+28	7
3	United States	3	1	1	1	82	55	+27	6
4	Mexico	3	0	0	3	12	120	−108	3

25 September 2021
09:00

United States	26–26	Canada
	Report

Commonwealth Stadium, Edmonton

25 September 2021
09:22

Great Britain	43–0	Mexico
	Report

Commonwealth Stadium, Edmonton

25 September 2021
12:11

United States	37–0	Mexico
	Report

Commonwealth Stadium, Edmonton

25 September 2021
12:33

Great Britain	7–7	Canada
	Report

Commonwealth Stadium, Edmonton

25 September 2021
15:22

Canada	40–12	Mexico
	Report

Commonwealth Stadium, Edmonton

25 September 2021
15:44

Great Britain	29–19	United States
	Report

Commonwealth Stadium, Edmonton

=== Playoffs ===
Semifinals
26 Sep – 11:42 – Commonwealth Stadium
Great Britain	50
Mexico	5
26 Sep – 12:04 – Commonwealth Stadium
Canada	12
United States	22

Final
26 Sep – 16:56 – Commonwealth Stadium
Great Britain	22
United States	5
3rd place final
26 Sep – 14:58 – Commonwealth Stadium
Mexico	5
Canada	63

Matches

Semifinals

26 September 2021
11:42

Great Britain	50–5	Mexico
	Report

Commonwealth Stadium, Edmonton

26 September 2021
12:04

Canada	12–22	United States
	Report

Commonwealth Stadium, Edmonton

3rd place final

26 September 2021
16:56

Mexico	5–63	Canada
	Report

Commonwealth Stadium, Edmonton

Final

26 September 2021
14:58

Great Britain	22–5	United States
	Report

Commonwealth Stadium, Edmonton

=== Tournament placings ===
Place	Team
1	Great Britain
2	United States
3	Canada
4	Mexico

== See also ==
- 2021 Canada Sevens (for men)

Canada Women's Sevens
Preceded by 2019 Canada Women's Sevens	2021 Canada Women's Sevens	Succeeded by 2022 Canada Women's Sevens
