= Malacchi Esdale =

American rugby union player (born 1995)

- Born: May 4, 1995 (age 31) Newark, Delaware, U.S.
- Height: 6 ft 2 in (188 cm)
- Weight: 190 lb (86 kg)

Rugby union career
- Position: Wing
Senior career
Years	Team	Apps	(Points)
2018–2020	Houston SaberCats	28	(25)
National sevens team
Years	Team		Comps
2021–	United States		

Malacchi Esdale (/ˈɛzdeɪl/ EZ-dayl; born May 4, 1995) is an American rugby union player for the United States men's national rugby sevens team. He was selected as part of the U.S. squad for the 2024 Summer Olympics.

== Early life and football career ==
Esdale was born on May 4, 1995, in Newark, Delaware. He attended middle school in the area before moving to Naples, Florida, for high school, with the goal of playing professional American football. He attended Naples High School, initially playing quarterback before switching to wide receiver; he totaled 17 receptions for 239 yards and three touchdowns as a junior. He also tried out rugby union at Naples, briefly playing for the Naples Bears before transferring to Appoquinimink High School in Delaware for his senior year.

Esdale played football at ASA College in New York and then transferred to play for the Miami Hurricanes, but was unable to make the team. He then transferred to the University of Central Florida (UCF) as a student and quit playing football.

== Rugby union career ==
While at UCF, Esdale joined the school's club rugby team. He later joined the amateur Orlando Griffins. In 2017, he was selected to play for the Houston SaberCats of Major League Rugby (MLR), which began in 2018. A wing, he played three years for the SaberCats from 2018 to 2020, appearing in 28 games while scoring 25 points.

Esdale was named an alternate for the United States men's national rugby sevens team at the 2020 Summer Olympics (held in 2021), but ultimately did not play. He made his debut at the HSBC World Rugby Sevens Series in 2021 against Canada. He was a part of the U.S. team at the Rugby World Cup Sevens in 2022. He was selected for the U.S. squad at the 2024 Summer Olympics. In The News Journal prior to the games, he described the conditioning necessary for Olympic rugby sevens as "borderline crazy". In November 2025, he joined Major League Rugby side Anthem RC for the 2026 season
