= Conor Phillips =

Irish rugby union player (born 1999)

- Born: 7 September 1999 (age 27) Limerick, Republic of Ireland
- Height: 1.80 m (5 ft 11 in)
- Weight: 92 kg (14.5 st; 203 lb)
- School: Crescent College
- University: University of Limerick

Rugby union career
- Position: Wing
Amateur team(s)
Years	Team	Apps	(Points)
- Young Munster
Senior career
Years	Team	Apps	(Points)
2022–2023	Munster	2	(0)
- Correct as of 7 October 2022
International career
Years	Team	Apps	(Points)
2019	Ireland U20	2	(0)
2021–	Ireland 7s	38	(60)
- Correct as of 26 September 2021

Conor Phillips (born 7 September 1999) is an Irish rugby union player and reality television star who is formerly a member of Munster's academy and the Ireland Rugby 7’s team. He played as a wing and represented Terenure College RFC in the amateur All-Ireland League.

== Early life ==
Phillips was born in Limerick, and attended Crescent College.

== Young Munster and academy ==
Phillips represented his native province of Munster at various underage levels, including under-18, under-19 and under-20. He was part of the Young Munster team that defeated Garryowen 11–8 to win the 2021–22 Munster Senior Cup in March 2022.

== Munster ==
After a series of strong performances for Munster's A team, including in the Celtic Cup, Phillips was rewarded with a place in Munster's academy in January 2021. Phillips made his senior competitive debut for Munster in their 2022–23 United Rugby Championship round three fixture against Italian club Zebre Parma on 1 October 2022, but was released by the province's academy upon the conclusion of the 2022–23 season.

== Ireland ==
Having previously represented Ireland at under-18 and under-19 level, Phillips was selected in the under-20s squad for the 2019 Six Nations Under 20s Championship. He started in the 35–27 win against England and the 24–5 win against Scotland, as Ireland secured their first grand slam in the tournament since 2007. Phillips missed the 2019 World Rugby Under 20 Championship in Argentina due to injury.

Phillips received his first call up to the Ireland 7s team ahead of the International Rugby 7's tournament at St George's Park, England in May 2021, where they played hosts Great Britain and the United States. He was also selected for the 2021 World Rugby Sevens Series. Phillips was called up to the Ireland 7s team for the Vancouver, Hong Kong, Singapore and Los Angeles legs of the 2025 SVNS series tour.

== Media Career ==
On 3 June 2025, Phillips was announced as a contestant on the twelfth series of the ITV2 dating show, Love Island.

== Honours ==
=== Young Munster ===
- Munster Senior Cup:
  - Winner (1): 2021–22

=== Munster ===
- United Rugby Championship
  - Winner (1): 2022–23

=== Ireland under-20s ===
- Six Nations Under 20s Championship:
  - Winner (1): 2019
- Grand Slam:
  - Winner (1): 2019
- Triple Crown:
  - Winner (1): 2019
