= Canada Women's Sevens =

Annual women's rugby sevens tournament

- Sport: Rugby sevens
- First season: 2015
- No. of teams: 12
- Country: Canada
- Most recent champion: New Zealand (2024)
- Most titles: New Zealand (6 titles)
- Website: canadasevens.com

The Canada Women's Sevens is an annual women's rugby sevens tournament, and one of the stops on the World Rugby Women's Sevens Series. Canada joined in the third year of the Series. The tournament was hosted at Westhills Stadium in the Victoria suburb of Langford, British Columbia. Since 2023 it has been hosted at BC Place in Vancouver alongside the men's tournament.

== Results ==
By placing

Summary of top-4 placings at the Canada Women's Sevens on the World Rugby Sevens Series (updated to 2024):

Team	(gold) Gold	(silver) Silver	(bronze) Bronze	Fourth	Total
New Zealand	6	2	—	—	8
Australia	1	3	2	1	7
England	1	—	1	—	2
Canada	—	1	1	—	2
France	—	1	—	7	8
Russia	—	1	—	—	1
United States	—	—	3	—	3
Ireland	—	—	1	—	1

Results by year

Year	Venue	Cup final			Placings			Refs
		Winner	Score	Runner-up	Third	Fourth	Fifth	
2015	Westhills Stadium	New Zealand	29–10	Russia	England	France	United States	
2016	Westhills Stadium	England	31–14	New Zealand	Australia	France	Canada	
2017	Westhills Stadium	New Zealand	17–7	Canada	Australia	France	Russia	
2018	Westhills Stadium	New Zealand	46–0	Australia	United States	France	Canada	
2019	Westhills Stadium	New Zealand	21–17	Australia	United States	France	Canada	
2020	Westhills Stadium	Tournament cancelled						
2021 I (Fast 4)	BC Place	Great Britain	34–12	United States	Canada	Mexico	—N/a	
2021 II (Fast 4)	Commonwealth Stadium	Great Britain	22–5	United States	Canada	Mexico	—N/a	
2022	Starlight Stadium	Australia	21–17	New Zealand	Ireland	France	Canada	
2023	BC Place	New Zealand	19–12	Australia	United States	France	Fiji	
2024	BC Place	New Zealand	35–19	France	Canada	Australia	United States	

Key:
Blue border on the left indicates tournaments in the World Rugby Sevens Series.

== See also ==
- Canada Sevens (for men's teams)
