= 2005–06 World Sevens Series =

2005–06 IRB Sevens
- Series VII
- Hosts: United Arab Emirates; South Africa; New Zealand; United States; Hong Kong; Singapore; France; England
- Date: 1 December 2005 – 4 June 2006
- Nations: 32

Final positions
- Champions: Fiji
- Runners-up: England
- Third: South Africa

The 2005–06 World Sevens Series was the seventh edition of the global circuit for men's national rugby sevens teams, run by the International Rugby Board since 1999-2000. The series was won by Fiji in the last event of the competition, ending New Zealand's 6-year run as series champions. Fiji needed to finish in fifth place or higher at the London Sevens to ensure that they would win the series ahead of England, but won the tournament handily with 54–14 victory over Samoa in the final.

== Itinerary ==
The most prestigious annual sevens event, the Hong Kong Sevens, returned to the series in 2005–06 after a one-year hiatus for the IRB Rugby World Cup Sevens, which was held in Hong Kong in March 2005 and won by Fiji. The tournaments spanned the globe for the 2005–06 World Sevens Series, with the following eight events scheduled:

2005-06 Itinerary
Leg	Venue	Date	Winner
Dubai	Dubai Exiles Rugby Ground	December 1–2, 2005	England
South Africa	Outeniqua Park, George	December 9–10, 2005	Fiji
New Zealand	Westpac Stadium, Wellington	February 3–4, 2006	Fiji
United States	Home Depot Center, Los Angeles	February 11–12, 2006	England
Hong Kong	Hong Kong Stadium	March 31-April 2, 2006	England
Singapore	National Stadium, Singapore	April 8–9, 2006	Fiji
Paris	Stade Charléty	May 27–28, 2006	South Africa
London	Twickenham	June 3–4, 2006	Fiji

== Competition format ==
The return of the Hong Kong Sevens to the 2005–06 series added a 24-team tournament into the mix again, alongside the standard 16-team format used for all the over events. Regardless of the number of teams competing, the basic structure of each event was broadly the same, beginning with the pool stage before progressing to a knockout stage to decide the tournament winners.

=== Pool stage ===
For the pool stage, teams were divided into pools of four – either 6 pools of four teams in a 24-team event, or 4 pools of four teams in a 16-team event – and a round-robin was played within each pool. The points awarded for the pool matches were 3 for a win, 2 for a draw, 1 for a loss. Where tie-breakers were required, the head-to-head result between the tied teams was used, followed by the difference in points scored during tournament play.

=== Knockout stage ===
The position achieved by each team in the pool stage determined its pathway in the knockout stage. Whether playing with 16 or 24 teams, however, only the top 8 sides from the pool stage could advance to the championship quarterfinals to compete for the tournament title.

==== 16 team tournament ====
For a standard 16-team event, four trophies were contested during the knockout stage – in descending order of prestige: the Cup (whose winner became the tournament champion), Plate, Bowl and Shield. The format of the playoffs is described below

Cup
- The top 8 sides (i.e. top two from each pool) advanced to the Cup quarterfinals
- The 4 winners of the quarterfinals meet in the Cup semifinal bracket to play off for first, second and shared third place in the tournament.

Plate

- The 4 losers of the Cup quarterfinals drop down to the Plate semifinal bracket to play off for fifth, sixth and shared seventh place in the tournament.

Bowl

- The 4 third-placed sides from each pool meet in the Bowl bracket to decide 9th, 10th and shared 11th place in the tournament.

Shield

- The 4 fourth-placed sides from each pool met in the Shield bracket to decide 13th, 14th and shared 15th place in the tournament.

==== 24-team tournament ====
For the 24-team event, only three trophies were contested during the knockout stage: Cup, Plate and Bowl. The format of the playoffs with 8-team brackets is described below.

Cup
- Top 8 sides (winners of the six pools, plus two best second-placed in the pools) meet in the Cup quarterfinals.
- The four losers are awarded a 4-way share of fifth place in the tournament.
- The four winners meet in the semifinal bracket to play off for first, second and shared third place in the tournament.

Plate

- Next-best 8 sides (four remaining second-placed in the pools, plus four best third-placed) meet in the Plate quarterfinals.
- The four losers are awarded a 4-way share of 13th place in the tournament.
- The four winners meet in the semifinal bracket to play off for 9th, 10th and shared 11th place in the tournament.

Bowl

- Bottom 8 sides (two remaining third-placed in the pools, plus the six fourth-placed) met in the Bowl quarterfinals.
- The four losers are awarded a 4-way share of 21st place in the tournament.
- The four winners meet in the semifinal bracket to play off for 17th, 18th and shared 19th place in the tournament.

=== Points schedules ===
The season championship was determined by the total points earned in all tournaments. The points schedules used for 2005–06 World Sevens Series were:

Points schedule: 16-team event
Points	Place	Status
20	1st	Cup winner
16	2nd	Cup runner-up
12	3rd^{(2-way share)}	Losing Cup semifinalists
8	5th	Plate winner
6	6th	Plate runner-up
4	7th^{(2-way share)}	Losing Plate semifinalists
1	9th	Bowl winner

Points schedule: 24-team event
Points	Place	Status
30	1st	Cup winner
24	2nd	Cup runner-up
18	3rd^{(2-way share)}	Losing Cup semifinalists
8	5th^{(4-way share)}	Losing Cup quarterfinalists
4	9th	Plate winner
3	10th	Plate runner-up
1	17th	Bowl winner

== Final standings ==
The points awarded to teams at each event, as well as the overall season totals, are shown in the table below. Gold indicates the event champions. Silver indicates the event runner-ups. A zero (0) is recorded in the event column where a team played in a tournament but did not gain any points. A dash (–) is recorded in the event column if a team did not compete at a tournament.

2005–06 IRB Sevens – Series VII
Pos.	Event Team	Dubai	George	Wellington	Los Angeles	Hong Kong	Singapore	Paris	London	Points total
1	Fiji	16	20	20	16	24	20	8	20	144
2	England	20	12	8	20	30	16	4	12	122
3	South Africa	12	12	16	12	18	12	20	8	110
4	New Zealand	8	6	12	12	18	4	4	12	76
5	Samoa	12	8	4	0	8	8	16	16	72
6	Argentina	4	16	6	8	8	12	6	4	64
7	France	6	4	12	6	0	6	12	4	50
8	Australia	4	4	4	4	8	4	12	0	40
9	Kenya	0	0	0	0	3	2	2	6	13
10	Scotland	0	0	2	2	8	0	0	0	12
11	Wales	2	2	–	–	4	–	–	–	8
12	Canada	0	0	0	4	0	0	0	0	4
13	Portugal	0	0	–	–	0	–	0	2	2
14	China	–	–	–	–	1	0	–	–	1
15	United States	–	–	0	0	0	–	–	–	0

Source: rugby7.com (archived)

Legend
Gold	Event Champions
Silver	Event Runner-ups
Light blue line on the left indicates a core team eligible to participate in all events of the series.

Notes:
New Zealand, which had won the first six World Sevens Series, was mathematically eliminated from contention for the 2005–06 crown after the Singapore Sevens. Fiji's title was the first in the seven-year history of the competition to be won by a country other than New Zealand.

== The events ==
=== Dubai ===
The opening event of the season saw England defend their title, but not without a major fight. They had a very tough semifinal against Samoa, surviving only via an injury-time try by Sevens newcomer Tom Varndell and conversion by Simon Amor after Samoa had been controversially reduced to six men in the final seconds. Facing England in the final was Fiji, which had a much tougher road to the final. In what would prove to be a harbinger of the season to come, they upset six-time defending series champion New Zealand in the quarterfinals. Fiji then defeated South Africa in the semifinals.

The final proved to be a back-and-forth game, with each team seemingly having an answer for the other's scores. However, Varndell, who was named player of the tournament, scored his third try of the final and 10th of the tournament with little more than a minute to go, giving England a lead Fiji could only reduce.

Event	Winners	Score	Finalists	Semi Finalists
Cup	England	28 - 26	Fiji	Samoa; South Africa
Plate	New Zealand	19 - 7	France	Argentina; Australia
Bowl	Wales	19 - 5	Canada	Portugal; Scotland
Shield	Kenya	10 - 7	Tunisia	Arabian Gulf; Uganda

=== South Africa ===
Here, Fiji scored their first win in an IRB Sevens event since their 2002 win in this very event. They defeated both New Zealand and England in the knockout phase to advance to the final. Their opponents were Argentina, who were upset by Wales in pool play, but went on to defeat New Zealand later in pool play. Fiji took a 14–0 lead after five minutes of the final, but Argentina stormed back to take a 19–14 lead. William Ryder scored a try near the end to draw Fiji level, with the winning points provided by a conversion from Sevens legend and player-coach Waisale Serevi. The man-of-the-tournament award went to Serevi's successor as Fiji Sevens captain, Jone Daunivucu.

Event	Winners	Score	Finalists	Semi Finalists
Cup	Fiji	21 - 19	Argentina	England; South Africa
Plate	Samoa	17 - 5	New Zealand	Australia; France
Bowl	Wales	34 - 14	Portugal	Scotland; Zimbabwe
Shield	Canada	12 - 5	Tunisia	Kenya; Namibia

=== New Zealand ===
This event made it clear to many observers that for the first time in the history of the World Sevens Series, New Zealand would not be the overall winner. While New Zealand were unable to win on home soil in Wellington, Fiji advanced to their third final this season, defeating New Zealand in the semifinals. The Fijians won a nail-biting extra-time final over South Africa to take pole position in the series.

Event	Winners	Score	Finalists	Semi Finalists
Cup	Fiji	27 - 22	South Africa	France; New Zealand
Plate	England	14 - 10	Argentina	Australia; Samoa
Bowl	Scotland	10 - 5	Canada	Cook Islands; Kenya
Shield	Tonga	19 - 14	Papua New Guinea	Niue; United States

=== United States ===
England stormed back into contention for the overall series crown here, destroying Fiji in the final. By this time, it became increasingly clear that the race for the title would be between the two Los Angeles finalists.

Event	Winners	Score	Finalists	Semi Finalists
Cup	England	38 - 5	Fiji	New Zealand; South Africa
Plate	Argentina	21 - 5	France	Australia; Canada
Bowl	Scotland	26 - 21	Tonga	Uruguay; Samoa
Shield	Kenya	26 - 12	United States	Mexico; West Indies

=== Hong Kong ===
The 30th edition of arguably the biggest event in the Sevens version of the game saw what Planet-Rugby.com called an "absolutely mesmerising" final. The first half belonged to England, who took advantage of a Fiji sin-binning to break open a tight game to take a 19–7 lead at the break. Serevi's men stormed back in the second half to level the score, and eventually took the lead on a Ryder try. However, they turned the ball over as the full-time siren sounded. England took advantage, with Ben Gollings scoring a try to tie the match and converting to win.

Event	Winners	Score	Finalists	Semi Finalists	
Cup	England	26 - 24	Fiji	New Zealand; South Africa	Argentina; Australia; Samoa; Scotland
Plate	Wales	15 - 5	Kenya	Canada; France	Japan; Portugal; Russia; South Korea
Bowl	China	47 - 0	Chinese Taipei	Hong Kong; Sri Lanka	Italy; Madagascar; Singapore; United States

=== Singapore ===
This event saw a rematch of the Hong Kong final, with Fiji scoring a comfortable win this time, despite missing two key players—Danivucu to a three-month disciplinary ban for biting Varndell in the Hong Kong final, and Epeli Dranivasa to a broken arm suffered in the same match. New Zealand were officially eliminated from contention for the series crown, crashing out in the Cup quarterfinals to Argentina and losing in the Plate semifinals to Samoa. Fiji placed themselves in pole position to claim the series crown; if they made the finals in Paris and England, they would win the series title no matter what England did.

Event	Winners	Score	Finalists	Semi Finalists
Cup	Fiji	40 - 21	England	Argentina; South Africa
Plate	Samoa	26 - 5	France	Australia; New Zealand
Bowl	Kenya	12 - 0	Japan	Canada; Scotland
Shield	South Korea	43 - 5	China	Hong Kong; Singapore

=== Paris ===
Going into Paris, second-place England knew they had to finish at least two spots ahead of Fiji in one of the remaining two tournaments to win the overall title. England caught a major break when the hosts, France, stunned Fiji 22–21 in the Cup quarterfinals, knocking them into the Plate competition. However, England could not take advantage of the upset, crashing out of the Cup at the same stage to Australia, 29–17. Fiji went on to win the Plate and extend their lead over England for the overall crown.

In the meantime, South Africa went on to win the Paris crown. In the final, they avenged a loss to Samoa in pool play, with Rayno Benjamin and Danwell Dimas scoring two tries apiece.

The results here all but assured Fiji the overall crown. England could only win the 2005-06 series if they won the final event at Twickenham and Fiji lost in or before the Plate semifinals.

Event	Winners	Score	Finalists	Semi Finalists
Cup	South Africa	33 - 12	Samoa	Australia; France
Plate	Fiji	31 - 12	Argentina	England; New Zealand
Bowl	Kenya	31 - 7	Italy	Canada; Tunisia
Shield	Scotland	40 - 0	Germany	Portugal; Russia

=== London ===
The first day saw Fiji, South Africa and New Zealand sweep through pool play unbeaten. The most competitive pool was Pool B, featuring the hosts England. The pool was tightly contested, with England neck-and-neck with Australia and surprise package Kenya. In a major shocker, Kenya easily defeated Australia 26–7. Although England would lose the day's final match 24–19 to Australia, they topped the pool on points difference, with Kenya finishing second.

On Day 2, Fiji clinched the overall series crown by defeating Kenya 33–14 in the Cup quarterfinals. They went on to crush South Pacific rivals Samoa 54–14 for the London crown. England held off South Africa for second place, advancing to the Cup semifinals while South Africa could only advance to the Plate final, in which they beat Kenya.

The Bowl competition went especially against form. In the first semifinal, Portugal surprised Scotland 24–12. The second saw an even more shocking result, as Russia used a hat trick from Igor Galinovskiy to stun Australia 21–5. Portugal won the final 45–0.

Event	Winners	Score	Finalists	Semi Finalists
Cup	Fiji	54 - 14	Samoa	England; New Zealand
Plate	South Africa	42 - 7	Kenya	Argentina; France
Bowl	Portugal	45 - 0	Russia	Australia; Scotland
Shield	Italy	17 - 12	Canada	Germany; Tunisia
