= 2004–05 World Sevens Series =

2004–05 IRB Sevens
- Series VI
- Hosts: United Arab Emirates; South Africa; New Zealand; United States; Singapore; England; France
- Date: 2 December 2004 – 11 June 2005
- Nations: 32

Final positions
- Champions: New Zealand
- Runners-up: Fiji
- Third: England

The 2004–05 Sevens World Series was the sixth edition of the global circuit for men's national rugby sevens teams, organised by the International Rugby Board since 1999–2000. The defending series champions New Zealand retained their title by winning the 2004–05 series.

== Calendar ==
2004–05 Itinerary
Leg	Venue	Dates	Winner
Dubai	Dubai Exiles Rugby Ground	December 2–3, 2004	England
South Africa	Outeniqua Park, George	December 10–11, 2004	New Zealand
New Zealand	Westpac Stadium, Wellington	February 4–5, 2005	New Zealand
United States	Home Depot Center, Los Angeles	February 12–13, 2005	New Zealand
Singapore	National Stadium, Singapore	April 1–2, 2005	New Zealand
London	Twickenham	June 4–5, 2005	South Africa
Paris	Stade Jean-Bouin	June 10–11, 2005	France

== Competition format ==
All tournaments in the 2004–05 series were played as a standard 16-team event, beginning with the pool stage before progressing to a knockout stage to decide the tournament winners.

=== Pool stage ===
For the pool stage, teams were divided into 4 pools of 4 teams and a round-robin was played within each pool. The points awarded for the pool matches were 3 for a win, 2 for a draw, 1 for a loss. Where tie-breakers were required, the head-to-head result between the tied teams was used, followed by the difference in points scored during tournament play.

=== Knockout stage ===
Four trophies were contested during the knockout stage – in descending order of prestige: the Cup (whose winner became the tournament champion), Plate, Bowl and Shield. The format of the playoffs is described below

Cup
- The top 8 sides (i.e. top two from each pool) advanced to the Cup quarterfinals
- The 4 winners of the quarterfinals meet in the Cup semifinal bracket to play off for first, second and shared third place in the tournament.

Plate

- The 4 losers of the Cup quarterfinals drop down to the Plate semifinal bracket to play off for fifth, sixth and shared seventh place in the tournament.

Bowl

- The 4 third-placed sides from each pool meet in the Bowl bracket to decide 9th, 10th and shared 11th place in the tournament.

Shield

- The 4 fourth-placed sides from each pool met in the Shield bracket to decide 13th, 14th and shared 15th place in the tournament.

=== Points schedule ===
The season championship was determined by the total points earned in all tournaments. The points schedule used for 2004–05 World Sevens Series was:

Points schedule: 16-team event
Points	Place	Status
20	1st	Cup winner
16	2nd	Cup runner-up
12	3rd^{(2-way share)}	Losing Cup semifinalists
8	5th	Plate winner
6	6th	Plate runner-up
4	7th^{(2-way share)}	Losing Plate semifinalists
2	9th	Bowl winner

== Final standings ==
The points awarded to teams at each event, as well as the overall season totals, are shown in the table below. Gold indicates the event champions. Silver indicates the event runner-ups. A zero (0) is recorded in the event column where a team played in a tournament but did not gain any points. A dash (–) is recorded in the event column if a team did not compete at a tournament.

2004–05 IRB Sevens – Series VI
Pos.	Event Team	Dubai	George	Wellington	Los Angeles	Singapore	London	Paris	Points total
1	New Zealand	12	20	20	20	20	12	12	116
2	Fiji	16	16	12	8	12	8	16	88
3	England	20	12	4	12	16	16	6	86
4	South Africa	12	8	12	4	12	20	8	76
5	Argentina	6	12	16	16	4	12	4	70
6	Samoa	8	6	4	6	8	2	12	46
7	Australia	4	2	8	12	6	6	4	42
8	France	0	0	0	4	2	4	20	30
9	Scotland	4	0	6	0	4	4	2	20
10	Kenya	0	4	2	0	0	0	0	6
11	Tunisia	0	4	–	–	–	0	0	4
12	Canada	0	0	0	2	0	0	0	2
13	Portugal	2	0	–	–	–	0	0	2
14	United States	–	–	0	0	–	–	–	0

Source: rugby7.com (archived)

Legend
Gold	Event Champions
Silver	Event Runner-ups
Light blue line on the left indicates a core team eligible to participate in all events of the series.

== Tournaments ==
=== Dubai ===
Trophy	Winners	Score	Finalists	Semi-finalists
Cup	Fiji	21–26	England	South Africa; New Zealand
Plate	Samoa	21–19	Argentina	Australia; Scotland
Bowl	France	5–10	Portugal	TBC; TBC
Shield	Ireland	5–17	Tunisia	TBC; TBC

=== South Africa ===
Trophy	Winners	Score	Finalists	Semi-finalists
Cup	New Zealand	33–19	Fiji	England; Argentina
Plate	South Africa	12–7	Samoa	Tunisia; Kenya
Bowl	Canada	12–38	Australia	TBC; TBC
Shield	Portugal	17–12	France	TBC; TBC

=== New Zealand ===
Trophy	Winners	Score	Finalists	Semi-finalists
Cup	Argentina	7–31	New Zealand	South Africa; Fiji
Plate	Scotland	0–32	Australia	Samoa; England
Bowl	Tonga	12–17	Kenya	TBC; TBC
Shield	Japan	19–29	Niue	TBC; TBC

=== United States ===
Trophy	Winners	Score	Finalists	Semi-finalists
Cup	Argentina	5–34	New Zealand	Australia; England
Plate	Samoa	21–24	Fiji	France; South Africa
Bowl	Kenya	0–15	Canada	TBC; TBC
Shield	Tonga	40–0	Mexico	TBC; TBC

=== Singapore ===
Trophy	Winners	Score	Finalists	Semi-finalists
Cup	New Zealand	26–5	England	Fiji; South Africa
Plate	Samoa	14–15	Australia	Scotland; Argentina
Bowl	Canada	12–19	France	TBC; TBC
Shield	Chinese Taipei	17–10	China	TBC; TBC

=== France ===
Trophy	Winners	Score	Finalists	Semi-finalists
Cup	France	28–19	Fiji	Samoa; New Zealand
Plate	South Africa	26–19	England	Australia; Scotland
Bowl	Argentina	26–10	Georgia	TBC; TBC
Shield	Canada	33–21	Russia	TBC; TBC

=== London ===
Trophy	Winners	Score	Finalists	Semi-finalists
Cup	South Africa	21–12	England	Argentina; New Zealand
Plate	Australia	12–29	Fiji	Scotland; France
Bowl	Tunisia	0–27	Samoa	TBC; TBC
Shield	Kenya	12–18	Canada	TBC; TBC
