= Muller du Plessis =

South African rugby union (born 1999)

- Full name: Hillegard Muller du Plessis
- Born: 25 June 1999 (age 27) Bethlehem
- Height: 1.85 m (6 ft 1 in)
- Weight: 85 kg (187 lb; 13 st 5 lb)
- School: Paarl Gimnasium
- Notable relative: JP du Plessis

Rugby union career
- Position: Fullback
- Current team: Sharks
Youth career
- 2011: Griffons
- 2012–2017: Western Province
- 2018–2019: Sharks
Senior career
Years	Team	Apps	(Points)
2022–	Sharks (Currie Cup)	0	(0)
2022–	Sharks	0	(0)
International career
Years	Team	Apps	(Points)
2016–2017	South Africa Schools	6	(20)
2018–2022	South Africa Sevens	102	(320)
2018	South Africa Under-20	1	(5)
- Correct as of 12 July 2024

Medal record

Men's rugby sevens

Representing South Africa

Commonwealth Games
Gold medal – first place	2022 Birmingham	Team competition

Hillegard Muller du Plessis (born 25 June 1999) is a South African rugby union player for the Sharks in the United Rugby Championship and the Currie Cup. He is a former rugby sevens player for the South Africa national rugby sevens team. He represented them in more than 100 matches and won two World Rugby Sevens Series titles, as well as a Commonwealth Games gold medal.

== Early life and schoolboy rugby ==
Du Plessis was born in Bethlehem in South Africa's Free State province as the son of Charl and Anneline du Plessis. He initially attended primary school in Reitz, where he represented local provincial union the Griffons at Under-12 level, before moving to Paarl and enrolling at the Paarl Gimnasium Primary School. In 2012, Du Plessis represented Western Province at the Under-13 Craven Week tournament held in Bloemfontein, appearing in four matches at inside centre and scoring a try in their opening match against the Pumas.

At high school level, Du Plessis attended and played rugby for Paarl Gimnasium. He was included in the Western Province squad for the 2015 Under-16 Grant Khomo Week, only to withdraw through injury. In the same year, he was selected in the South African Rugby Union's High Performance program.

In 2016, he was named in Western Province's squad for the Under-18 Craven Week tournament held in Durban. He started all three matches, scoring two tries in their second match against the Sharks, and helping them to a 27–20 victory over the Golden Lions in the main match to be crowned unofficial champions. At the conclusion of the tournament, Du Plessis was included in the South Africa Schools squad for the Under-19 International Series, helping the team to victories over Wales, France — scoring two tries in a 42–3 win — and England.

Du Plessis captained Paarl Gimnasium's first team during 2017, and was again included in the Craven Week side for the tournament in Johannesburg. He started all three matches at the tournament, scoring tries in matches against the Pumas and the Free State Cheetahs. He received a second call-up to the South Africa Schools squad for the 2017 edition of the Under-19 International Series, but could not prevent the team suffering defeats to Wales, France and England, with Du Plessis scoring two tries in the final match in a 22–52 defeat.

== Rugby career ==
After finishing school, Du Plessis signed a contract to join the Durban-based Sharks team, and also linked up with the South African Sevens Academy in Stellenbosch. He was included the academy squad that competed at two events in the 2018 Sudamérica Rugby Sevens, helping them to win both the Punta Del Este Sevens in Uruguay and the Viña del Mar Sevens in Chile.

Shortly after returning to South Africa, Du Plessis was called up by the senior squad to travel to the 2018 Hamilton Sevens as their reserve player, but a pulled hamstring resulted in Du Plessis being a late withdrawal from the team. This setback proved to be minor, as he was included in their next squad for the 2018 USA Sevens, where he duly made his debut. He also appeared at the events in Canada (where he scored his first try in the series), Hong Kong (where he scored 7 tries for the team) and Singapore, in a season that saw South Africa go on to win the series by pipping Fiji to the title.

Du Plessis returned to the fifteen-man version of the sport when he was called up to the South Africa Under-20 squad for the World Rugby Under 20 Championship held in France. He did not feature in their opening match of the tournament against Georgia, but was named in the starting lineup for their second match against Ireland. He scored a try in the 19th minute of the match to set his team on the way to a 30–17 victory. However, he was replaced at half-time, and a gluteal muscle injury ruled him out of the remainder of the championship.

He returned to domestic action in South Africa for the Sharks in the Under-19 Provincial Championship.

In 2022, He was part of the South African team that won their second Commonwealth Games gold medal in Birmingham.
