= SVNS =

International series of men's rugby union tournaments

HSBC SVNS
- Current season, competition or edition: 2026–27 SVNS
- Formerly: IRB Sevens World Series (1999–2014); Sevens World Series (2014–2015); World Rugby Sevens Series (2015–2023)
- Sport: Rugby sevens
- Founded: 1999; 27 years ago
- First season: 1999–2000
- No. of teams: 8 (2025–26)
- Most recent champions: Series: South Africa (2025–26); Grand Final: South Africa (2026)
- Most titles: Series: New Zealand (14 titles); Grand Final: South Africa (2 titles)
- Qualification: Challenger Series (until 2025); SVNS 2 (from 2026)
- Broadcasters: List of broadcasters
- Level on pyramid: 1
- Website: svns.com

The SVNS, known as the HSBC SVNS for sponsorship reasons, is an annual series of international rugby sevens tournaments run by World Rugby featuring national sevens teams. Organised for the first time in the 1999–2000 season as the IRB World Sevens Series, the competition was formed to promote an elite-level of international rugby sevens and develop the game into a viable commercial product. The competition has been sponsored by banking group HSBC since 2014.

The season's circuit consists of eight tournaments held in five continents, generally beginning in November or December and ending in May or June. All tournaments feature the same 12 teams.

Teams compete for the World Rugby Series title by accumulating points based on their finishing position in each tournament. The bottom four teams play a repechange tournament against the top four teams of the World Rugby Sevens Challenger Series.

New Zealand had originally dominated the Series, winning each of the first six seasons from 1999–2000 to 2004–05, but since then, Fiji, South Africa, Samoa, Australia and Argentina have each won season titles. England and the United States have placed in the top three for several seasons but have not won the series title.

The International Olympic Committee's decision in 2009 to add rugby sevens to the Summer Olympics beginning in 2016 has added a boost to rugby sevens and to the World Sevens Series; this boost has led to increased exposure and revenues, leading several of the core teams to field fully professional squads.

== History ==
=== International sevens ===
The first international rugby sevens tournament was held in 1973 in Scotland, which was celebrating a century of the Scottish Rugby Union. Seven international teams took part, with England defeating Ireland 22–18 in the final to take the trophy. The Hong Kong Sevens annual tournament began in 1976. Over the next two decades the number of international sevens competitions increased. The most notable was the Rugby World Cup Sevens with Scotland hosting the inaugural event in 1993, along with rugby joining the Commonwealth Games program in 1998.

=== World Series early years ===
Former series logos: 1999; 2011–2015.

The first season of the World Sevens Series was the 1999–2000 season. At the Series launch, the chairman of the International Rugby Board, Vernon Pugh, described the IRB's vision of the role of this new competition: "this competition has set in place another important element in the IRB's drive to establish rugby as a truly global sport, one with widespread visibility and steadily improving standards of athletic excellence." New Zealand and Fiji dominated the first series, meeting in the final in eight of the ten season tournaments, and New Zealand narrowly won, overtaking Fiji by winning the last tournament of the series.

New Zealand won the first six seasons in a row from 1999–2000 to 2004–05, led by players such as Karl Te Nana and Amasio Valence. The number of stops in the series varied over the seasons, but experienced a contraction from 11 tournaments in 2001–02 to 7 tournaments in 2002–03 due to the global recession. In the 2005–06 season Fiji clinched the season trophy on the last tournament of the season finishing ahead of England. New Zealand regained the trophy in 2006–07 season in the last tournament of the season.

South Africa was the next team to win the series after taking home the 2008–09 title. In the 2009–10 season, Samoa who finished seventh the previous year shocked the world – led by 2010 top try-scorer and World Rugby Sevens Player of the Year Mikaele Pesamino – by winning four of the last five tournaments to overtake New Zealand and win the series.

=== Olympic era and professionalism ===
The number of core teams expanded from 12 to 15 for the 2011–12 series. Qualification for these places was played out at the 2012 Hong Kong Sevens. Canada (returning to core status for the first time since 2008), Spain and Portugal joined the 12 core teams for the next season. The Japan event also made a return for the first time since 2001 (lasting until 2015). New Zealand continued their dominance by finishing on top.

Argentina was originally planned to begin hosting a tenth event with Mar Del Plata the venue in the 2012–13 season, giving the tour an event on each continent, but when Argentina joined the Rugby Championship those plans were shelved. With the same schedule, New Zealand again were the winners over South Africa. They took it again in 2013–14 with Spain the first team to be relegated after finishing last during that season with Japan replacing them.

Heading into the 2014–15 season, the top four teams qualifying to the 2016 Summer Olympics, with Fiji, South Africa, New Zealand and Great Britain all qualifying through. The 2014–15 season and 2015–16 season were won by Fiji – the first time a team other than New Zealand won back-to-back season titles – led by 2015 and 2016 season Dream Team nominee Osea Kolinisau The two seasons also yielded teams winning their first tournaments – the United States won the 2015 London Sevens to finish the season in sixth overall; Kenya won the 2016 Singapore Sevens, and Scotland won the 2016 London Sevens. Prior to the 2015–16 season World Rugby did a comprehensive review of all nine tournament hosts and adjusted the schedule, dropping two sites (Japan and Scotland), and adding three sites (France, Singapore and Canada) to the calendar.

In the 2016–17 series, a dominant and consistent display by South Africa saw them reach the finals of the 2016–17 series rounds on eight occasions, winning five of these. As a result, South Africa were series champions with victory in the penultimate round in Paris. The season was a qualifier for the 2018 Rugby World Cup Sevens with the top four teams that had not already qualified, coming from this season. The teams that made it through to the World Cup via this method were Canada, Argentina, Scotland and Samoa.

== Tournament hosts ==
The World Series will consist of nine scheduled tournament stops from the 2025–26 season, which generally fall in the same order and timeframes. From 2020 to 2022, however, several of these events had to be cancelled due to impacts of the COVID-19 pandemic.

| Event | Venue | City | Joined series (Note: Most of these tournaments were established when added to the World Series, with certain exceptions. The two oldest are Dubai, which began in 1970, and Hong Kong which began in 1976. The tournaments in Australia and France date back to 1986 and 1996, respectively.) | First held at current venue | Scheduled | Ref |
|---|---|---|---|---|---|---|
| (United Arab Emirates) Dubai | The Sevens Stadium | Dubai | 1999–2000 | 2008–09 | 29–30 November 2025 | |
| South Africa | DHL Stadium | Cape Town | 1999–2000 | 2015–16 | 6–7 December 2025 | |
| Singapore | National Stadium | Singapore | 2015–16 | 2015–16 | 31 January–1 February 2026 | |
| Australia | HBF Park | Perth | 1999–2000 | 2023–24 | 7–8 February 2026 | |
| Canada | BC Place | Vancouver | 2015–16 | 2015–16 | 7–8 March 2026 | |
| (United States) USA | Sports Illustrated Stadium | New York (Note: Physical location is Harrison, New Jersey.) | 2003–04 | 2025–26 | 14–15 March 2026 | |
| Hong Kong | Kai Tak Stadium | Hong Kong | 1999–2000 | 2024–25 | 17–19 April 2026 | |
| Spain | José Zorrilla Stadium | Valladolid | 2021–22 | 2025–26 | 29–31 May 2026 | |
| France | Stade Atlantique | Bordeaux | 1999–2000 | 2025–26 | 5–7 June 2026 | |

== Teams, promotion and relegation ==
=== Core teams ===
A group of core teams, currently 8 in number, is announced for each season based on performances in the previous season. Each core team has a guaranteed place in all of that season's events. The core teams have been selected through a designated promotion/relegation process since the 2012–13 season. A new system from the 2023–24 season, saw 12 core teams, with anywhere from 1 to 4 teams being relegated each season. However, as part of the structural reforms from the 2024–25 season, the number of core teams were further reduced to 8.

| # | Team | Core since | Best Series finish (Last) |
|---|---|---|---|
| 1 | Argentina | 1999–2000 | 1st (2024–25) |
| 2 | Fiji | 1999–2000 | 1st (2018–19) |
| 3 | Spain | 2017–18 | 3rd (2024–25) |
| 4 | South Africa | 1999–2000 | 1st (2025–26) |
| 5 | France | 1999–2000 | 4th (2023–24) |
| 6 | Australia | 1999–2000 | 1st (2021–22) |
| 7 | New Zealand | 1999–2000 | 1st (2022–23) |
| 8 | United States | 1999–2000 to 2024–25, 2026–27 | 2nd (2018–19) |

Former core teams
| Team | Last season as core | Best Series finish (Last) |
|---|---|---|
| Great Britain | 2025–26 | 2nd (2021) |
| Kenya | 2024–25 | 3rd (2021) |
| Uruguay | 2024–25 | 12th (2022–23) |
| Ireland | 2024–25 | 2nd (2023–24) |
| Samoa | 2023–24 | 1st (2009–10) |
| Canada | 2023–24 | 4th (2021) |
| Japan | 2022–23 | 12th* (1999–2000) |
| England | 2021–22 | 2nd (2016–17) |
| Scotland | 2021–22 | 7th (2016–17) |
| Wales | 2021–22 | 6th (2006–07) |
| Russia | 2017–18 | 14th (2016–17) |
| Portugal | 2015–16 | 14th (2014–15) |

Key: * indicates a tied placing

=== Invited teams ===
Non-core teams are also invited to compete in every season of the World Rugby Sevens Series under previous formats. With 15 core teams, there was generally only one invited team at each 16-team tournament. Before 2012–13, when there were only 12 core teams, four places at each tournament were usually available to invited teams.

Invited teams with a Top-15 Series finish
| Team | Last season played | Best Series finish (Last) |
|---|---|---|
| Chile | 2021 | 11th (2021) |
| China | 2010–11 | 14th (2005–06) |
| Cook Islands | 2011–12 | 13th (2001–02) |
| Georgia | 2008–09 | 10th* (1999–00) |
| Germany | 2021–22 | 7th (2021) |
| Hong Kong | 2022–23 | 8th (2021) |
| Italy | 2009–10 | 15th (2002–03) |
| Jamaica | 2021–22 | 10th (2021) |
| South Korea | 2019–20 | 11th (2000–01) |
| Morocco | 2011–12 | 15th (2001–02) |
| Mexico | 2021 | 12th (2021) |
| Namibia | 2010–11 | 14th (2001–02) |
| Papua New Guinea | 2017–18 | 12th* (1999–00) |
| Tonga | 2018–19 | 10th* (1999–00) |
| Tunisia | 2009–10 | 11th (2004–05) |
| Zimbabwe | 2018–19 | 14th (2000–01) |

Key: * indicates a tied placing

=== Promotion and relegation ===
Historical systems; 2013–14 to 2018–19 One team relegated and one promoted each year. Bottom core team relegated. Winner of the 12-team qualifying tournament at the Hong Kong Sevens promoted.

2018–19 to 2022–23:
World Rugby Sevens Challenger Series:

In 2019, World Rugby announced a second-tier competition (the World Rugby Sevens Challenger Series) so strong regional teams could compete in a similar format and earn promotion to the main Sevens Series (later rebranded HSBC SVNS Series) as core teams.

One team relegated and one promoted each year. Bottom core team relegated to the World Rugby Sevens Challenger Series. Eight teams competed for promotion at the Hong Kong Sevens after qualifying via the World Rugby Sevens Challenger Series.

2023–24 to 2024–25: Teams ranked 9–12 in the SVNS Series joined the top 4 from the World Rugby Sevens Challenger Series in a promotion/relegation play-off at the Grand Final. Top 4 from that event stayed in/promoted to the SVNS (12-team core). Bottom 4 relegated to the Challenger Series.

Current system (from 2025–26 season onward): The World Rugby Sevens Challenger Series was replaced by a three-division structure: HSBC SVNS Series (Division 1): 8 core men's + 8 core women's teams compete in six regular-season events. HSBC SVNS 2 (Division 2): 6 teams per gender compete across three events. The top 4 qualify for the Grand Final. HSBC SVNS 3 (Division 3): 8 teams per gender (qualified via regional competitions) play a single event. The top 2 promote to SVNS 2. Season finale – SVNS Grand Final Three events (Hong Kong, Valladolid, Bordeaux) featuring 12 teams per gender: the 8 Division 1 teams + the top 4 from Division 2. Cumulative standings across these three events decide: The top 8 secure/retain SVNS Series (core) status for the next season. The bottom 4 are relegated/returned to SVNS 2.

| Season | Core teams | Relegated (post-season) | Promoted (for the next season) |
|---|---|---|---|
| 2011–12 | 12 | No relegation | Canada; Portugal; Spain |
| 2012–13 | 15 | No relegation or promotion | |
| 2013–14 | 15 | Spain | Japan |
| 2014–15 | 15 | Japan | Russia |
| 2015–16 | 15 | Portugal | Japan |
| 2016–17 | 15 | Japan | Spain |
| 2017–18 | 15 | Russia | Japan |
| 2018–19 | 15 | Japan | Ireland |
| 2019–20 | 15 | No relegation (Note: There was no relegation from the 2019–20 core teams due to the curtailed season. Therefore, Wales, who would have been relegated as the lowest placed core team, retained core team status. Japan was promoted as the winner of the Challenger Series, making it 16 core teams for the following series.) | Japan |
| 2021 | 16 (Note: Only 6 of the 16 core teams took part in the 2021 Series, which consisted of two tournament events played in Canada.) | No relegation or promotion (Note: All 16 core teams from the truncated 2021 season retained their core status for the 2021–22 season, with no promotion or relegation.) | |
| 2021–22 | 16 (Note: The first two events in Dubai will be played with only 14 teams, as England, Scotland and Wales will be replaced for Great Britain.) | No relegation | Uruguay |
| 2022–23 | 15 (Note: The teams that make up Great Britain combined form the 2022–23 season onwards from three teams to one.) | Japan; Kenya; Uruguay | No promotion |
| 2023–24 | 12 | Samoa; Canada | Uruguay; Kenya |
| 2024–25 | 12 | Kenya; Uruguay; Ireland; United States | No promotion |
| 2025–26 | 8 | Great Britain | United States |

=== Other qualifying ===
The World Series results are sometimes used as a qualifier for other tournaments. For example, the top four teams of the 2014–15 series automatically qualified for the 2016 Summer Olympics. Similarly, certain teams from the 2016–17 series qualified for the 2018 Rugby World Cup Sevens.

== Historical results ==
=== Top 6 placings by season - Series ===
Summary of the top six placegetters for each series:

| Series | Season | Rds | Champion | Second | Third | Fourth | Fifth | Sixth | Ref |
|---|---|---|---|---|---|---|---|---|---|
| I | 1999–2000 | 10 | ^{New Zealand}_{^{(186 pts)}} | Fiji | Australia | Samoa | South Africa | Canada | |
| II | 2000–01 | 9 | ^{New Zealand}_{^{(162 pts)}} | Australia | Fiji | Samoa | South Africa | Argentina | |
| III | 2001–02 | 11 | ^{New Zealand}_{^{(198 pts)}} | South Africa | England | Fiji | Australia | Samoa | |
| IV | 2002–03 | 7 (Note: Due to concerns in 2003 about the SARS virus, tournaments scheduled for China, Malaysia, and Singapore were cancelled.) | ^{New Zealand}_{^{(112 pts)}} | England | Fiji | South Africa | Australia | Samoa | |
| V | 2003–04 | 8 | ^{New Zealand}_{^{(128 pts)}} | England | Argentina | Fiji | South Africa | Samoa | |
| VI | 2004–05 | 7 | ^{New Zealand}_{^{(116 pts)}} | Fiji | England | South Africa | Argentina | Australia | |
| VII | 2005–06 | 8 | ^{Fiji}_{^{(144 pts)}} | England | South Africa | New Zealand | Samoa | Argentina | |
| VIII | 2006–07 | 8 | ^{New Zealand}_{^{(130 pts)}} | Fiji | Samoa | South Africa | England | Wales | |
| IX | 2007–08 | 8 | ^{New Zealand}_{^{(154 pts)}} | South Africa | Samoa | Fiji | England | Argentina | |
| X | 2008–09 | 8 | ^{South Africa}_{^{(132 pts)}} | Fiji | England | New Zealand | Argentina | Kenya | |
| XI | 2009–10 | 8 | ^{Samoa}_{^{(164 pts)}} | New Zealand | Australia | Fiji | England | South Africa | |
| XII | 2010–11 | 8 | ^{New Zealand}_{^{(166 pts)}} | South Africa | England | Fiji | Samoa | Australia | |
| XIII | 2011–12 | 9 | ^{New Zealand}_{^{(167 pts)}} | Fiji | England | Samoa | South Africa | Australia | |
| XIV | 2012–13 | 9 | ^{New Zealand}_{^{(173 pts)}} | South Africa | Fiji | Samoa | Kenya | England | |
| XV | 2013–14 | 9 | ^{New Zealand}_{^{(180 pts)}} | South Africa | Fiji | England | Australia | Canada | |
| XVI | 2014–15 | 9 | ^{Fiji}_{^{(164 pts)}} | South Africa | New Zealand | England | Australia | United States | |
| XVII | 2015–16 | 10 | ^{Fiji}_{^{(181 pts)}} | South Africa | New Zealand | Australia | Argentina | United States | |
| XVIII | 2016–17 | 10 | ^{South Africa}_{^{(192 pts)}} | England | Fiji | New Zealand | United States | Australia | |
| XIX | 2017–18 | 10 | ^{South Africa}_{^{(182 pts)}} | Fiji | New Zealand | Australia | England | United States | |
| XX | 2018–19 | 10 | ^{Fiji}_{^{(186 pts)}} | United States | New Zealand | South Africa | England | Samoa | |
| XXI | 2019–20 | 6 (Note: The last four rounds of the 2020 World Rugby Sevens Series, scheduled for London, Paris, Singapore, and Hong Kong, were cancelled due to impacts of the COVID-19 pandemic.) | ^{New Zealand}_{^{(115 pts)}} | South Africa | Fiji | Australia | England | France | |
| XXII | 2021 | 2 (Note: Due to impacts of the COVID-19 pandemic, only two tournaments were played during the 2021 series (instead of the usual ten) and most of the top teams from the 2019–20 series did not compete.) | ^{South Africa}_{^{(40 pts)}} | Great Britain | Kenya | Canada | United States | Ireland | |
| XXIII | 2021–22 | 9 | ^{Australia}_{^{(126 pts)}} | South Africa | Fiji | Argentina | Ireland | United States | |
| XXIV | 2022–23 | 11 | ^{New Zealand}_{^{(200 pts)}} | Argentina | Fiji | France | Australia | Samoa | |
| XXV | 2023–24 | 7 | ^{Argentina}_{^{(106 pts)}} | Ireland | New Zealand | Australia | Fiji | France | |
| XXVI | 2024–25 | 6 | ^{Argentina}_{^{(104 pts)}} | Fiji | Spain | South Africa | France | Australia | |
| XXVII | 2025–26 | 6 | ^{South Africa}_{^{(106 pts)}} | Fiji | Australia | New Zealand | France | Argentina | |

=== Top 6 placings by team - Series ===
Tally of top six placings in the series for each team, updated after the most recently completed 2025–26 season (obtained by summing the placings of each team as recorded in the above table of results by season).

| Team | Champion | Runner-up | Third | Fourth | Top-3 Apps | Top-6 Apps |
|---|---|---|---|---|---|---|
| New Zealand | 14 | 1 | 5 | 4 | 20 | 24 |
| South Africa | 5 | 9 | 1 | 5 | 15 | 25 |
| Fiji | 4 | 8 | 8 | 5 | 20 | 26 |
| Argentina | 2 | 1 | 1 | 1 | 4 | 12 |
| Australia | 1 | 1 | 3 | 4 | 5 | 18 |
| Samoa | 1 | – | 2 | 4 | 3 | 14 |
| England | – | 4 | 5 | 2 | 9 | 18 |
| United States | – | 1 | – | – | 1 | 7 |
| Ireland | – | 1 | – | – | 1 | 3 |
| Great Britain | – | 1 | – | – | 1 | 1 |
| Kenya | – | – | 1 | – | 1 | 3 |
| Spain | – | – | 1 | – | 1 | 1 |
| France | – | – | – | 1 | – | 5 |
| Canada | – | – | – | 1 | – | 3 |
| Wales | – | – | – | – | – | 1 |

=== Top 6 placings by season - Grand Final ===
Summary of the top six placegetters for each grand final:

| | Location(s) | Champion | Second | Third | Fourth | Fifth | Sixth | Ref |
|---|---|---|---|---|---|---|---|---|
| 2023–24 | Madrid | France | Argentina | Fiji | New Zealand | Ireland | South Africa | |
| 2024–25 | (United States) Los Angeles | South Africa | Spain | New Zealand | Argentina | France | Great Britain | |
| 2025–26 | Hong Kong (Spain) Valladolid (France) Bordeaux | ^{South Africa}_{^{(52 pts)}} | New Zealand | Spain | Argentina | Australia | Fiji | |

=== Top 6 placings by team - Grand Final ===
Tally of top six placings in the Grand Final for each team, updated after the most recently completed 2025–26 season (obtained by summing the placings of each team as recorded in the above table of results by season).

| Team | Champion | Runner-up | Third | Fourth | Top-3 Apps | Top-6 Apps |
|---|---|---|---|---|---|---|
| South Africa | 2 | – | – | – | 2 | 3 |
| France | 1 | – | – | – | 1 | 2 |
| New Zealand | – | 1 | 1 | 1 | 2 | 3 |
| Spain | – | 1 | 1 | – | 2 | 2 |
| Argentina | – | 1 | – | 2 | 1 | 3 |
| Fiji | – | – | 1 | – | 1 | 2 |
| Australia | – | – | – | – | – | 1 |
| Ireland | – | – | – | – | – | 1 |
| Great Britain | – | – | – | – | – | 1 |

=== Total Tournaments won by team ===
Updated on 7 June 2026.

No. of Tournaments won since 1999
| Titles | Country | Last tournament won |
|---|---|---|
| 70 | New Zealand | 2025 Dubai Sevens |
| 48 | South Africa | 2026 Hong Kong Sevens |
| 47 | Fiji | 2026 Singapore Sevens |
| 19 | England | 2017 Canada Sevens |
| 12 | Argentina | 2025 Hong Kong Sevens |
| 11 | Samoa | 2022 South Africa Sevens |
| 10 | Australia | 2026 Spain Sevens |
| 4 | France | 2026 France Sevens |
| 3 | United States | 2019 USA Sevens |
| 2 | Scotland | 2017 London Sevens |
| 1 | Canada | 2017 Singapore Sevens |
| 1 | Kenya | 2016 Singapore Sevens |

== Format ==
Rugby sevens is a fast-paced version of rugby union with seven players each side on a full-sized rugby field. Games are much shorter, lasting seven minutes each half. The game is quicker and faster-scoring than 15-a-side rugby, which explains part of its appeal. It also gives players the space for superb feats of individual skill. Sevens is traditionally played in a two-day tournament format. Currently, in a normal event, 16 teams are entered.

World Rugby operates satellite tournaments in each continent alongside the Sevens World Series which serve as qualifiers for Series events; in 2012–13 they also determined the entrants in the World Series Pre-Qualifier, and since 2013–14 determine the entrants in the Core Team Qualifier.

In each tournament, the teams are divided into pools of four teams, who play a round-robin within the pool. Points are awarded in each pool on a different schedule from most rugby tournaments—3 for a win, 2 for a draw, 1 for a loss, 0 for a no-show. In case teams are tied after pool play, the tiebreakers are:

1. Head-to-head result between the tied teams.
2. Difference in points scored and allowed during pool play.
3. Difference in tries scored and allowed during pool play.
4. Points scored during pool play.
5. Coin toss.

As of the 2009–10 series, four trophies are awarded in each tournament. In descending order of prestige, they are the Cup, whose winner is the overall tournament champion, Plate, Bowl and Shield. Each trophy is awarded at the end of a knockout tournament.

In a normal event, the top two teams in each pool advance to the Cup competition. The four quarterfinal losers drop into the bracket for the Plate. The Bowl is contested by the third and fourth-place finishers in each pool, while the Shield is contested by the losing quarterfinalists of the Bowl.

A third-place match is now conducted between the losing Cup semifinalists in all tournaments; this was introduced for the 2011–12 series.

In 2012–13, the season-ending London Sevens expanded to 20 teams, with 12 competing for series points and eight involved in the Core Team Qualifier. With the promotion place now determined at the Hong Kong Sevens, the London Sevens returned to the traditional 16-team format in 2013–14.

The 2024 Rugby Perth Sevens features nine men's and six women's rounds over six months. The calendar includes stopovers in many of the usual destinations, from London to Langford, plus three new cities (Malaga, Seville and Toulouse) to replace traditional hosts Australia and New Zealand.

=== Hong Kong 7s ===
The Hong Kong Sevens (an anomaly as a three-day event) is the most famous sevens tournament. The Hong Kong Sevens had 24 teams through the 2011–12 series, but has featured 28 teams since 2012–13, with 15 core teams and the winner of the HSBC Asian Sevens Series competing for series points. At the 2013 event, the remaining 12 teams were those in the World Series Pre-Qualifier; from 2014 forward, the remaining 12 teams are those in the Core Team Qualifier. In Hong Kong, the Shield was awarded for the first time in 2010.

Originally, the six pool winners of the Hong Kong Sevens, plus the two highest-finishing second-place teams, advanced to the Cup.

In 2010 and 2011, a different system was used:

- The losing quarterfinalists in the Cup competition contested the Plate competition.
- The four remaining second-place teams and the four best third-place teams, which contested the Plate in previous years, competed for the Bowl.
- The remaining eight teams in the competition, which contested the Bowl in previous years, competed for the Shield.

In the transitional year of 2012, the Hong Kong Sevens was split into two separate competitions. The 12 core teams competed for the Cup, Plate and Bowl under a format similar to that of a regular event. The 12 invited teams all competed for the Shield, with the top three sides in that competition also earning core status for 2012–13.

From 2013 on, the Hong Kong Sevens was played under the same 16-team format used in the rest of the series, with typically 15 core teams plus an invited team (for Hong Kong, usually the winner of the HSBC Asian Sevens Series) competing in the main draw of the tournament. In line with changes which began at the start of the 2016–17 World Rugby Sevens Series, the duration of the Cup final was reduced from 20 minutes to 14 minutes in 2017. In that season, the number of trophies was also reduced to two; the main Cup contested by the top eight teams from the pool stage, and a Challenge Trophy contested by the bottom eight teams from the pool stage.

=== Points schedule ===
The season championship is determined by points earned in each tournament. World Rugby introduced a new scoring system for the 2011–12 series, in which all teams participating in a tournament are guaranteed points. Initially, World Rugby announced the new points schedule only for the standard 16-team events; the allocations for the Hong Kong Sevens were announced later. A new scoring system was introduced in 2019–20 requiring teams to play for 7th, 11th and 15th places, previously teams had tied for 7th–8th 11th–12th and 15th–16th places.

The points schedule used at each standard event until 2023 is summarised below.

| Place | Status | Points |
|---|---|---|
| 1st place, gold medalist(s) | Cup winner, gold medalist | 22 |
| 2nd place, silver medalist(s) | Cup runner-up, silver medalist | 19 |
| 3rd place, bronze medalist(s) | 3rd-place winner, bronze medalist | 17 |
| 4 | 3rd-place loser | 15 |
| 5 | 5th-place winner | 13 |
| 6 | 5th-place loser | 12 |
| 7 | 7th-place winner | 11 |
| 8 | 7th-place loser | 10 |
| 9 | 9th-place winner | 8 |
| 10 | 9th-place loser | 7 |
| 11 | 11th-place winner | 6 |
| 12 | 11th-place loser | 5 |
| 13 | 13th-place winner | 4 |
| 14 | 13th-place loser | 3 |
| 15 | 15th-place winner | 2 |
| 16 | 15th-place loser | 1 |

From 2023–24 the following points schedule is used for each event:

| Place | Status | Points |
|---|---|---|
| 1st place, gold medalist(s) | Cup winner, gold medalist | 20 |
| 2nd place, silver medalist(s) | Cup runner-up, silver medalist | 18 |
| 3rd place, bronze medalist(s) | 3rd-place winner, bronze medalist | 16 |
| 4 | 3rd-place loser | 14 |
| 5 | 5th-place winner | 12 |
| 6 | 5th-place loser | 10 |
| 7 | 7th-place winner | 8 |
| 8 | 7th-place loser | 6 |
| 9 | 9th-place winner | 4 |
| 10 | 9th-place loser | 3 |
| 11 | 11th-place winner | 2 |
| 12 | 11th-place loser | 1 |

Tie-breaking: If two or more teams are level on overall series points, the following tie-breakers are used:

1. Overall difference in points scored and allowed during the season.
2. Total try count during the season.
3. If neither of the above produces a winner, the teams are considered tied.

== Business ==
=== TV and media ===
The tour received 1,147 hours of air time in 2005–06; 530 of which was live, and was broadcast to 136 countries. By 2008–09, the hours of air time had increased to over 3,300, with 35 broadcasters airing the series in 139 countries and 15 languages. Broadcast time increased further in 2009–10, with 3,561 hours of air time (1,143 hours live) carried by 34 broadcasters in 141 countries and 16 languages. In 2010–11, 3,657 hours of coverage were aired (1,161 hours live), with the same number of broadcasters as the previous season but six new countries added. For that season, Sevens World Series programming was available in 332 million homes worldwide, with a potential audience of 760 million.

=== Sponsorship ===
The International Rugby Board reached a 5-year deal with HSBC in October 2010 that granted them status as the first-ever title sponsor of the Sevens World Series. Through the agreement, HSBC acquired title naming rights to all tournaments in the World Series, beginning with the Dubai Sevens on 3 December 2010. HSBC has since sub-licensed the naming rights to individual tournaments, while retaining its name sponsorship of the overall series. A renewed, 4-year deal was announced before the 2015–16 Series, this deal was also expanded to include the World Rugby Women's Sevens Series.

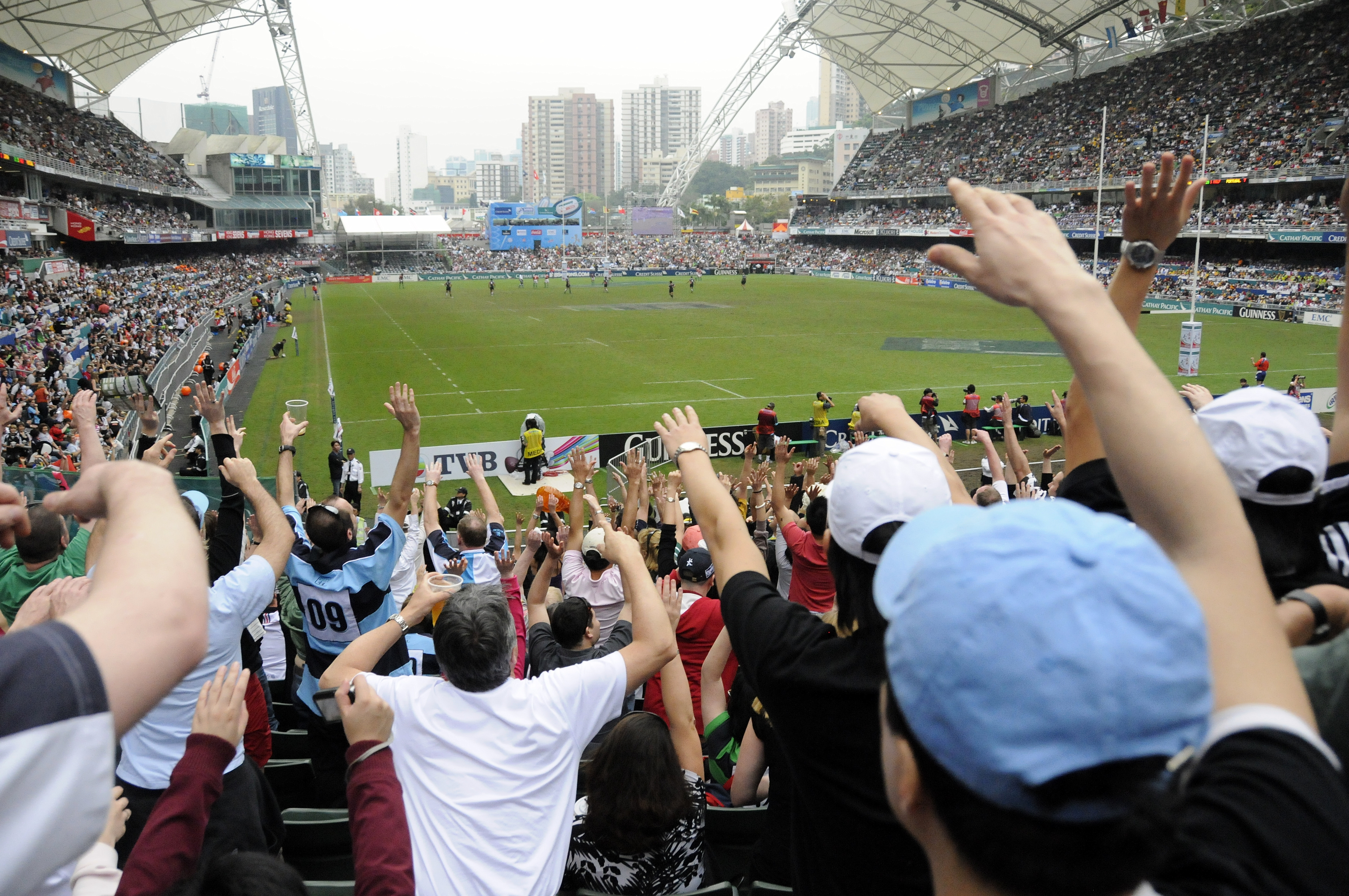
Crowd cheering at the 2009 Hong Kong Sevens.

Tournament Naming Rights
| Tournament | Sponsor |
|---|---|
| Dubai | Emirates/HSBC |
| South Africa | HSBC |
| Singapore | HSBC |
| Australia | HSBC |
| Canada | HSBC |
| USA | HSBC |
| Hong Kong | Cathay Pacific/HSBC |
| Spain | HSBC |
| France | HSBC |

== Player contracts and salaries ==
In the year after the International Olympic Committee announced in 2009 that rugby sevens would return to the Olympics in 2016, most of the "core teams" on the Series began offering full-time contracts to their players. These annual salaries can range from €18,000 to €100,000. England offers among the more generous salaries, ranging from an estimated €25,000 to over €100,000. New Zealand has a graded system with salaries ranging from €23,000-plus to about €52,500 for its four top earners. The basic salary for Scottish sevens players ranges from €22,500 to €40,000. The Australian sevens players are estimated to be on a basic salary of about €27,000-plus. Toward the bottom end of the scale is Ireland, offering its players a €18,000 to €23,750 development contract, less than minimum wage.

== Player awards by season ==
| Season | Rounds | Most points | Most tries | Rookie of the Year | Player of the Year | Ref |
|---|---|---|---|---|---|---|
| 1999–00 | 10 | (Fiji) Waisale Serevi (684) | (Fiji) Vilimoni Delasau (83) | No award | No award | |
| 2000–01 | 9 | (New Zealand) Damian Karauna (262) | (New Zealand) Karl Te Nana (42) | No award | No award | |
| 2001–02 | 11 | (South Africa) Brent Russell (450) | (South Africa) Brent Russell (46) | No award | No award | |
| 2002–03 | 7 | (Fiji) Nasoni Roko (321) | (Fiji) Nasoni Roko (39) | No award | No award | |
| 2003–04 | 8 | (England) Ben Gollings (394) | (South Africa) Fabian Juries & (England) Rob Thirlby (39) | No award | (England) Simon Amor | |
| 2004–05 | 7 | (New Zealand) Orene Ai'i (308) | (Samoa) David Lemi (46) | No award | (New Zealand) Orene Ai'i | |
| 2005–06 | 8 | (England) Ben Gollings (343) | (Samoa) Timoteo Iosua (40) | No award | (Samoa) Uale Mai | |
| 2006–07 | 8 | (Fiji) William Ryder (416) | (Samoa) Mikaele Pesamino (43) | No award | (New Zealand) Afeleke Pelenise | |
| 2007–08 | 8 | (New Zealand) Tomasi Cama Jr. (319) | (South Africa) Fabian Juries (41) | No award | (New Zealand) DJ Forbes | |
| 2008–09 | 8 | (England) Ben Gollings (260) | (Kenya) Collins Injera (42) | No award | (England) Ollie Phillips | |
| 2009–10 | 8 | (England) Ben Gollings (332) | (Samoa) Mikaele Pesamino (56) | No award | (Samoa) Mikaele Pesamino | |
| 2010–11 | 8 | (South Africa) Cecil Afrika (381) | (South Africa) Cecil Afrika (40) | No award | (South Africa) Cecil Afrika | |
| 2011–12 | 9 | (New Zealand) Tomasi Cama Jr. (390) | (England) Matt Turner (38) | No award | (New Zealand) Tomasi Cama Jr. | |
| 2012–13 | 9 | (England) Dan Norton (264) | (England) Dan Norton (52) | No award | (New Zealand) Tim Mikkelson | |
| 2013–14 | 9 | (England) Tom Mitchell (358) | (Fiji) Samisoni Viriviri (52) | (New Zealand) Ambrose Curtis | (Fiji) Samisoni Viriviri | |
| 2014–15 | 9 | (Fiji) Osea Kolinisau (312) | (South Africa) Seabelo Senatla (47) | (Fiji) Jerry Tuwai | (South Africa) Werner Kok | |
| 2015–16 | 10 | (United States) Madison Hughes (331) | (South Africa) Seabelo Senatla (66) | (Australia) Henry Hutchison | (South Africa) Seabelo Senatla | |
| 2016–17 | 10 | (United States) Perry Baker (285) | (United States) Perry Baker (57) | (Argentina) Matías Osadczuk | (United States) Perry Baker | |
| 2017–18 | 10 | (Canada) Nathan Hirayama (334) | (United States) Carlin Isles (49) | (Fiji) Eroni Sau | (United States) Perry Baker | |
| 2018–19 | 10 | (New Zealand) Andrew Knewstubb (307) | (United States) Carlin Isles (52) | (Fiji) Meli Derenalagi | (Fiji) Jerry Tuwai | |
| 2019–20 | 6 | (Fiji) Napolioni Bolaca (159) | Jordan Conroy (30) | No award | No award | |
| 2021 | 2 | (South Africa) Ronald Brown (91) | (South Africa) Muller du Plessis (13) | (Argentina) Marcos Moneta | (Argentina) Marcos Moneta | |
| 2021–22 | 9 | (Australia) Dietrich Roache (343) | (Ireland) Terry Kennedy (50) | Corey Toole | (Ireland) Terry Kennedy | |
| 2022–23 | 11 | (New Zealand) Akuila Rokolisoa (415) | (Samoa) Va'a Apelu Maliko (50) | (South Africa) Ricardo Duarttee | (Argentina) Rodrigo Isgro | |
| 2023–24 | 8 | Terry Kennedy (160) | Terry Kennedy (32) | Antoine Dupont | Antoine Dupont | |
| 2024–25 | 7 | Joji Nasova (158) | Joji Nasova & Marcos Moneta (26) | Enahemo Artaud | Luciano González | |

== Player records ==
Players in bold are still active.

=== Tries ===
Most career tries
| Rank | Player | Nationality | Tries |
|---|---|---|---|
| 1 | Dan Norton | England/Great Britain | 358 |
| 2 | **Perry Baker** | United States | 293 |
| 3 | Collins Injera | Kenya | 279 |
| 4 | **Tim Mikkelson** | New Zealand | 240 |
| 5 | Seabelo Senatla | South Africa | 230 |
| 5 | Santiago Gómez Cora | Argentina | 230 |
| 7 | Ben Gollings | England | 220 |
| 8 | Carlin Isles | United States | 217 |
| 9 | Marcos Moneta | Argentina | 181 |
| 10 | Cecil Afrika | South Africa | 179 |

Updated: 1 July 2024

=== Points ===
Most career points
| Rank | Player | Nationality | Points |
|---|---|---|---|
| 1 | Ben Gollings | England | 2,652 |
| 2 | Tomasi Cama | New Zealand | 2,028 |
| 3 | Nathan Hirayama | Canada | 1,859 |
| 4 | Dan Norton | England/Great Britain | 1,804 |
| 5 | **Madison Hughes** | United States | 1,596 |
| 6 | Tom Mitchell | England | 1,595 |
| 7 | **Perry Baker** | United States | 1,467 |
| 8 | Cecil Afrika | South Africa | 1,462 |
| 9 | Branco du Preez | South Africa | 1,447 |
| 10 | Collins Injera | Kenya | 1,443 |

Updated: 1 July 2024

=== Matches ===
Most career matches
| Rank | Player | Nationality | Matches |
|---|---|---|---|
| 1 | **Gaston Revol** | Argentina | 492 |
| 2 | **Tim Mikkelson** | New Zealand | 488 |
| 3 | Dan Norton | England/Great Britain | 470 |
| 4 | DJ Forbes | New Zealand | 450 |
| 5 | Branco du Preez | South Africa | 431 |
| 6 | **Jonathan Laugel** | France | 427 |
| 7 | James Rodwell | England | 424 |
| 7 | Collins Injera | Kenya | 424 |
| 9 | Folau Niua | United States | 387 |
| 10 | Chris Dry | South Africa | 373 |

Updated: 1 July 2024.

== See also ==
- Rugby sevens at the Summer Olympics
- Rugby World Cup Sevens
- World Rugby Women's Sevens Series
