= 2021–22 World Rugby Sevens Series squads =

International rugby sevens

Sevens 2021–22 squads

This is a list of the complete squads for the 2021–22 World Rugby Sevens Series.

Legend
| Gold | Indicates the captains for a tournament |
| – | Indicates that a player did not play in the tournament |

== Argentina ==
Head Coach: (Argentina) Santiago Gómez Cora

Argentina team members 2021–22
| Player | Jersey number by tournament | | | | | | | | |
| Player | Dubai I | Dubai II | Málaga | Seville | Singapore | Vancouver | Toulouse | London | Los Angeles |
|---|---|---|---|---|---|---|---|---|---|
| Santiago Álvarez | 6 | 6 | 6 | 6 | – | – | – | – | – |
| Lautaro Bazan Velez | 7 | – | 7 | 7 | – | 7 | – | – | – |
| Joaquín De La Vega | 4 | 4 | 4 | 4 | 4 | 4 | 4 | 4 | 4 |
| Felipe del Mestre | 10 | 10 | 10 | 10 | 10 | 10 | 10 | 10 | – |
| Tomás Elizalde | 5 | 5 | 5 | – | – | – | – | – | – |
| Luciano González | 11 | 11 | 11 | 11 | 11 | 11 | 11 | 11 | 11 |
| Matteo Graziano | 2 | 7 | – | – | – | – | – | – | 6 |
| Rodrigo Isgró | 1 | 1 | 1 | 1 | 1 | 1 | 1 | – | 1 |
| Joaquín Lamas | 13 | 13 | 9 | 9 | – | – | 6 | 6 | – |
| Tomás Lizazu | 9 | 9 | – | – | – | – | – | – | 2 |
| Gastón Revol | 8 | 8 | 8 | 8 | 8 | 8 | 8 | 8 | 8 |
| Germán Schulz | 3 | 3 | 3 | 3 | 3 | 3 | 3 | 3 | 3 |
| Santiago Vera Feld | 12 | 2 | 2 | 2 | 2 | 2 | 2 | 2 | – |
| Marcos Moneta | – | 12 | 13 | 13 | 13 | 13 | 13 | 13 | – |
| Franco Sabato | – | – | 12 | 12 | 12 | 12 | 12 | 12 | 12 |
| Agustín Fraga | – | – | – | 5 | 5 | 5 | 5 | 5 | 5 |
| Felipe De La Vega | – | – | – | – | 6 | 6 | – | – | – |
| Francisco Ulloa | – | – | – | – | 9 | – | – | 1 | – |
| Tobias Wade | – | – | – | – | 7 | 9 | 7 | 7 | 10 |
| Matías Osadczuk | – | – | – | – | – | – | 9 | 9 | 9 |
| Alejo Lavayen | – | – | – | – | – | – | – | – | 7 |
| Franco Rossetto | – | – | – | – | – | – | – | – | 12 |

== Australia ==
Head Coach: (Australia) John Manenti

Australia team members 2021–22
| Player | Jersey number by tournament | | | | | | | | |
| Player | Dubai I | Dubai II | Málaga | Seville | Singapore | Vancouver | Toulouse | London | Los Angeles |
|---|---|---|---|---|---|---|---|---|---|
| Ben Dowling | 8 | 8 | 8 | 8 | – | – | 2 | 2 | – |
| Henry Hutchison | 1 | 1 | 1 | 1 | 1 | 1 | 1 | 1 | 1 |
| Kristian Jensen | 12 | 12 | – | – | – | – | – | – | – |
| Maurice Longbottom | 11 | – | 11 | 11 | 11 | 11 | 11 | 11 | 11 |
| Nick Malouf | 10 | 10 | – | – | 10 | 10 | 10 | 10 | 10 |
| Billy Meakes | 9 | 9 | – | – | – | – | – | – | 2 |
| Henry Paterson | 6 | 6 | – | 13 | 12 | 12 | 6 | 6 | 6 |
| Dietrich Roache | 4 | 4 | 4 | 4 | 4 | 4 | 4 | 4 | 4 |
| Jed Stuart | 13 | 13 | 13 | – | – | – | – | – | – |
| Corey Toole | 3 | 3 | 3 | 3 | 3 | 3 | 3 | 3 | 3 |
| Josh Turner | 7 | 7 | 7 | 7 | 7 | 7 | 7 | 7 | 7 |
| Solomone Vosaicake | 2 | 2 | 2 | 2 | – | – | – | – | – |
| Yool Yool | 5 | 5 | 5 | 5 | – | – | – | – | – |
| Stuart Dunbar | – | 11 | 9 | 9 | 9 | – | 9 | 9 | 9 |
| Chris Kuridrani | – | – | 10 | 10 | – | – | – | – | – |
| Darby Lancaster | – | – | 6 | 6 | 6 | 6 | – | – | – |
| Nathan Lawson | – | – | 12 | 12 | – | 9 | 12 | 12 | 12 |
| Tim Clements | – | – | – | – | 5 | 5 | – | – | – |
| Matthew Gonzalez | – | – | – | – | 8 | 8 | 8 | 8 | 8 |
| Michael Icely | – | – | – | – | 2 | 2 | – | – | – |
| Ben Marr | – | – | – | – | 13 | 13 | 13 | 13 | 13 |
| Max Burey | – | — | – | – | – | – | 5 | 5 | – |
| James Turner | – | – | – | – | – | – | – | – | 5 |

== Canada ==
Head Coach: (New Zealand) Henry Paul

Canada team members 2021–22
| Player | Jersey number by tournament | | | | | | | | |
| Player | Dubai I | Dubai II | Málaga | Seville | Singapore | Vancouver | Toulouse | London | Los Angeles |
|---|---|---|---|---|---|---|---|---|---|
| Nicholas Allen | 3 | 3 | 3 | 3 | – | 3 | 3 | 3 | – |
| D'Shawn Bowen | 9 | 9 | – | – | 1 | 1 | – | – | 9 |
| Andrew Coe | 4 | 4 | – | – | – | – | – | – | – |
| John Cooper | 8 | 8 | – | – | – | – | – | – | – |
| Jarvis Dashkewytch | 13 | 13 | – | – | 13 | – | – | – | – |
| Elias Ergas | 11 | 11 | 11 | 11 | 11 | 11 | 11 | 11 | 11 |
| Thomas Isherwood | 12 | 12 | 12 | 12 | 6 | – | 6 | 6 | 3 |
| Lachlan Kratz | 10 | 10 | – | – | 10 | 10 | 10 | 10 | 10 |
| Josiah Morra | 6 | 6 | 6 | 6 | – | – | – | – | 6 |
| Cody Nhanala | 5 | 5 | – | – | – | – | – | – | – |
| Theo Saudder | 1 | 1 | 1 | 1 | – | – | – | – | – |
| Jake Thiel | 2 | – | 2 | 2 | – | 2 | 2 | 2 | 2 |
| Brock Webster | 7 | 7 | – | – | 7 | 7 | 7 | 7 | 7 |
| Brenning Prevost | – | 2 | – | – | 9 | 9 | 9 | 9 | – |
| Noah Bain | – | – | 10 | 10 | – | – | – | – | – |
| Phil Berna | – | – | 4 | 4 | 4 | 4 | 4 | 4 | 4 |
| Cooper Coats | – | – | 8 | 8 | – | 8 | 8 | 8 | 8 |
| Sion Griffiths | – | – | 9 | 9 | – | – | – | – | – |
| Anton Ngongo | – | – | 7 | 7 | 2 | 6 | 1 | 1 | 1 |
| Matt Oworu | – | – | 13 | 13 | 8 | 13 | 13 | 13 | – |
| Alex Russell | – | – | 5 | 5 | 5 | 5 | 5 | 5 | 5 |
| Elias Hancock | – | – | – | – | 3 | – | – | – | – |
| David Richard | – | – | – | – | 12 | 12 | 12 | 12 | – |
| Ciaran Breen | – | – | – | – | – | – | – | – | 13 |
| Josh Thiel | – | – | – | – | – | – | – | – | 12 |

== England ==
Head Coach: (England) Tony Roques

England team members 2021–22
| Player | Jersey number by tournament | | | | | | |
| Player | Málaga | Seville | Singapore | Vancouver | Toulouse | London | Los Angeles |
|---|---|---|---|---|---|---|---|
| Jamie Adamson | 13 | 13 | 1 | 1 | 1 | 1 | 1 |
| Jamie Barden | 6 | 6 | 6 | 6 | 6 | – | 7 |
| Tom Bowen | 8 | 8 | 8 | 8 | 8 | 8 | 8 |
| Blake Boyland | 5 | 5 | 5 | 5 | 5 | 5 | 5 |
| Joe Browning | 11 | 11 | 11 | 11 | 11 | 11 | – |
| Max Clementson | 2 | 2 | 2 | 2 | 2 | 2 | 2 |
| Ed Coulson | 10 | 10 | 10 | 10 | – | – | – |
| Alex Davis | 3 | 3 | – | 3 | 3 | 3 | – |
| Will Homer | 12 | 12 | 12 | 12 | 12 | 12 | 12 |
| Hayden Hyde | 4 | 4 | – | – | 4 | 4 | – |
| Calum Randle | 7 | 7 | 3 | 7 | 7 | 7 | 4 |
| Freddie Roddick | 9 | 9 | 9 | 9 | 9 | 9 | 9 |
| Will Trenholm | 1 | 1 | – | – | – | – | – |
| Toby Baldwin | – | – | 7 | – | – | – | – |
| Api Bavadra | – | – | 13 | 13 | 13 | 13 | 13 |
| Dan Norton | – | – | 4 | 4 | – | – | – |
| Tom Emery | – | – | – | – | 10 | 10 | 10 |
| Charlton Kerr | – | – | – | – | – | 6 | 11 |
| Tom Mitchell | – | – | – | – | – | – | 6 |
| Ethan Waddleton | – | – | – | – | – | – | 3 |

== Fiji ==
Head Coach: (England) Ben Gollings

Fiji team members 2021–22
| Player | Jersey number by tournament | | | | |
| Player | Singapore | Vancouver | Toulouse | London | Los Angeles |
|---|---|---|---|---|---|
| Pilipo Bukayaro | 7 | 7 | 9 | 9 | 7 |
| Elia Canakaivata | 5 | 5 | 5 | 5 | – |
| Tevita Daugunu | 4 | 4 | 4 | 4 | – |
| Josevani Drava | 13 | 13 | – | – | – |
| Jeremaia Matana | 3 | 3 | – | 3 | 3 |
| Waisea Nacuqu | 8 | 8 | 8 | 8 | 8 |
| Vuiviawa Naduvalo | 12 | 12 | 12 | 12 | 13 |
| Iowane Raturaciri | 6 | 6 | – | – | – |
| Kaminieli Rasaku | 11 | 11 | 11 | 11 | 11 |
| Joseva Talacolo | 2 | – | 2 | – | 2 |
| Iowane Teba | 10 | 10 | – | – | 10 |
| Jerry Tuwai | 9 | 9 | – | – | 9 |
| Josua Vakurunabili | 1 | 1 | 1 | 1 | 1 |
| Tira Welagi Patterson | – | 2 | – | – | – |
| Napolioni Bolaca | – | – | 7 | 7 | – |
| Semi Kunatani | – | – | 6 | 6 | – |
| Manueli Maisamoa | – | – | 10 | 10 | 12 |
| Sevuloni Mocenacagi | – | – | 3 | – | 4 |
| Filipe Sauturaga | – | – | 13 | 13 | 6 |
| Kavekini Tabu | – | – | – | 2 | – |
| Iosefo Masi | – | – | – | – | 5 |

== France ==
Head Coach: (France) Jérôme Daret

France team members 2021–22
| Player | Jersey number by tournament | | | | | | | | |
| Player | Dubai I | Dubai II | Málaga | Seville | Singapore | Vancouver | Toulouse | London | Los Angeles |
|---|---|---|---|---|---|---|---|---|---|
| Nelson Épée | 7 | 7 | 7 | 7 | 7 | 7 | – | 2 | 7 |
| Nisie Huyard | 2 | – | 2 | 2 | 2 | 2 | 2 | – | 2 |
| William Iraguha | 4 | 4 | 4 | – | 4 | 4 | 4 | 4 | 11 |
| Jonathan Laugel | 1 | 1 | 1 | 1 | 1 | 1 | 1 | 1 | 1 |
| Pierre Mignot | 8 | 8 | 8 | – | – | – | 8 | 8 | 13 |
| Marvin O'Connor | 9 | 9 | – | – | – | – | – | – | – |
| Stephen Parez | 5 | 5 | 5 | 5 | 5 | – | – | – | 5 |
| Varian Pasquet | 10 | 10 | 10 | 10 | 10 | – | – | – | 8 |
| Rayan Rebbadj | 3 | 3 | – | – | 3 | 3 | – | – | – |
| Paulin Riva | 6 | 6 | 6 | 6 | 6 | 6 | 6 | 6 | 6 |
| Jordan Sepho | 12 | 12 | 12 | 12 | 12 | 12 | 12 | 12 | 12 |
| Alexander Tchaptchet | 13 | 13 | 13 | – | – | – | – | – | – |
| Joachim Trouabal | 11 | 11 | 11 | 11 | 11 | 11 | 11 | 11 | – |
| Ethan Dumortier | – | 2 | – | – | – | – | – | 3 | – |
| Aaron Grandidier | – | – | 9 | 9 | 9 | 9 | 9 | 9 | 9 |
| Joris Simon | – | – | 3 | 3 | – | 10 | 3 | – | – |
| Julien Blanc | – | – | – | 4 | – | – | – | – | – |
| Esteban Capilla | – | – | – | 8 | – | – | 7 | 7 | – |
| Dylan Jaminet | – | – | – | 13 | – | – | – | – | – |
| Guillaume Bouche | – | – | – | – | 13 | 13 | 13 | 13 | – |
| Thibaud Mazzoleni | – | – | – | – | 8 | 8 | 10 | 10 | 4 |
| Marius Domon | – | – | – | – | – | 5 | 5 | 5 | – |
| Jean-Pascal Barraque | – | – | – | – | – | – | – | – | 10 |
| Tavite Veredamu | – | – | – | – | – | – | – | – | 3 |

== Ireland ==
Head Coach: (Northern Ireland) James Topping

Ireland team members 2021–22
| Player | Jersey number by tournament | | | | | | | | |
| Player | Dubai I | Dubai II | Málaga | Seville | Singapore | Vancouver | Toulouse | London | Los Angeles |
|---|---|---|---|---|---|---|---|---|---|
| Niall Comerford | 3 | 3 | 3 | 3 | – | – | – | – | 11 |
| Sean Cribbin | 11 | 11 | 11 | 11 | – | – | – | – | – |
| Billy Dardis | 6 | 6 | – | – | 6 | 6 | 6 | 6 | 6 |
| Fergus Jemphrey | 4 | – | – | – | – | – | – | 13 | – |
| Ed Kelly | 7 | 8 | 8 | – | – | – | – | – | 12 |
| Jack Kelly | 1 | 1 | 1 | 1 | 1 | 1 | 1 | 1 | 1 |
| Terry Kennedy | 10 | 10 | 10 | 10 | 10 | 10 | 10 | 10 | 10 |
| Hugo Lennox | 8 | – | – | – | 8 | 8 | 8 | 8 | 8 |
| Aaron O'Sullivan | 5 | 5 | – | 8 | – | – | – | 5 | 13 |
| Jude Postlethwaite | 13 | 13 | – | – | – | – | – | – | – |
| Mark Roche | 9 | 9 | 9 | 9 | 9 | 9 | 9 | 9 | 9 |
| Liam Turner | 2 | 2 | – | – | – | – | – | – | – |
| Zac Ward | 12 | 12 | 12 | 12 | – | – | 12 | – | – |
| Jordan Conroy | – | 7 | – | – | 7 | 7 | 7 | 7 | 7 |
| Andrew Smith | – | 4 | 7 | 7 | 4 | 4 | 2 | 2 | 2 |
| Tamilore Awonusi | – | – | 5 | 5 | 5 | 5 | – | – | – |
| Sean Kearns | – | – | 6 | 6 | – | – | 5 | – | – |
| Bryan Mollen | – | – | 4 | 4 | – | – | 4 | 4 | 4 |
| Conor Phillips | – | – | 2 | 2 | – | – | – | – | – |
| Tom Roche | – | – | 13 | 13 | – | – | 13 | – | – |
| Steven Kilgallen | – | – | – | – | 13 | 13 | – | – | – |
| Matthew McDonald | – | – | – | – | 2 | 2 | – | 12 | – |
| Harry McNulty | – | – | – | – | 3 | 3 | 3 | 3 | 3 |
| Gavin Mullin | – | – | – | – | 11 | 11 | – | – | – |
| Chay Mullins | – | – | – | – | 12 | 12 | 11 | 11 | 5 |

== Japan ==
Head Coach: (Japan) Koichi Umeda

Japan team members 2021–22
| Player | Jersey number by tournament | | | | | | | | |
| Player | Dubai I | Dubai II | Málaga | Seville | Singapore | Vancouver | Toulouse | London | Los Angeles |
|---|---|---|---|---|---|---|---|---|---|
| Johnny Faauli | 8 | 8 | – | – | – | – | – | – | – |
| Moeki Fukushi | 6 | 6 | 6 | 6 | 6 | 6 | 6 | 6 | 6 |
| Taisei Hayashi | 5 | 11 | 11 | – | – | – | – | – | – |
| Ryota Kano | 7 | 7 | 7 | 7 | – | 7 | 7 | 7 | 7 |
| Aseri Masivou | 3 | 3 | – | – | – | – | – | – | – |
| Chikara Morita | 12 | – | 10 | 10 | 10 | 10 | 10 | – | – |
| Kazuma Nakagawa | 2 | 2 | 2 | 2 | 2 | 2 | 2 | 2 | 2 |
| Larry Sulunga | 4 | – | – | – | – | – | – | – | – |
| Kavaia Tagivetaua | 9 | – | – | – | – | – | – | – | – |
| Tumanawa Tawhai | 13 | 13 | – | – | – | – | – | – | – |
| Shotaro Tsuoka | 1 | 1 | 1 | 1 | – | 11 | 11 | 11 | 11 |
| Netani Vakayalia | 11 | – | – | – | – | – | – | – | – |
| Netani Yamamura | 10 | 10 | – | – | – | – | – | – | – |
| Taiga Ishida | – | 12 | 12 | 12 | 12 | 12 | 12 | 12 | 12 |
| Kameli Soejima | – | 5 | 5 | 5 | 5 | 5 | 5 | 5 | 5 |
| Shoga Tokota | – | 4 | – | – | – | – | – | – | – |
| Shun Tomonaga | – | 9 | 9 | 9 | 9 | 9 | 9 | 9 | 9 |
| Yuki Ishii | – | – | 4 | 4 | 4 | 4 | 4 | 4 | 4 |
| Sitaleki Taufa Makisi | – | – | 13 | 13 | 13 | – | 13 | 13 | – |
| Ren Miyagami | – | – | 3 | 3 | 3 | 3 | 3 | 3 | – |
| Yoshihiro Noguchi | – | – | 8 | – | – | – | 8 | 8 | 8 |
| Yu Okudaira | – | – | – | 11 | – | – | – | – | 10 |
| Haruhiko Uemura | – | – | – | 8 | – | – | – | – | – |
| Ren Takano | – | – | – | – | 11 | – | – | – | – |
| Hibiki Yamada | – | – | – | – | 8 | 8 | – | – | – |
| Shintaro Yokose | – | – | – | – | 7 | – | – | – | – |
| Daisuke Yoshida | – | – | – | – | 1 | 1 | – | 10 | – |
| Harunori Tsuruya | – | – | – | – | – | 13 | – | – | – |
| Timo Fiti Sufia | – | – | – | – | – | – | 1 | 1 | 1 |
| Yoshiyuki Koga | – | – | – | – | – | – | – | – | 13 |
| Taichi Yoshizawa | – | – | – | – | – | – | – | – | 3 |

== Kenya ==
Head Coach: (Kenya) Innocent Simiyu (until Vancouver), (England) Damian McGrath (from Toulouse)

Kenya team members 2021–22
| Player | Jersey number by tournament | | | | | | | | |
| Player | Dubai I | Dubai II | Málaga | Seville | Singapore | Vancouver | Toulouse | London | Los Angeles |
|---|---|---|---|---|---|---|---|---|---|
| Levi Amunga | 4 | – | 12 | 12 | 12 | 12 | – | – | – |
| Edmund Anyaa | 11 | 11 | – | – | 11 | 11 | 11 | 11 | 11 |
| Herman Humwa | 8 | 8 | 8 | 8 | 8 | 8 | 8 | 8 | – |
| Alvin Marube | 13 | 13 | – | – | 10 | 10 | – | – | – |
| Timothy Mmasi | 12 | 12 | – | – | – | – | 12 | 12 | – |
| Bush Mwale | 2 | 2 | 2 | 2 | 2 | 2 | 2 | 2 | 2 |
| Billy Odhiambo | 5 | 5 | 5 | 5 | 5 | 5 | 5 | 5 | 5 |
| Johnstone Olindi | 10 | 10 | 10 | 10 | – | – | 10 | 10 | 6 |
| Jeff Oluoch | 6 | 6 | 6 | 6 | – | – | – | – | 13 |
| Anthony Omondi | 7 | 7 | – | – | – | – | – | – | – |
| Alvin Otieno | 3 | 3 | 3 | 3 | – | – | 3 | 3 | 3 |
| Nelson Oyoo | 9 | 9 | 9 | 9 | 9 | 9 | 9 | 9 | 9 |
| Daniel Taabu | 1 | 1 | 1 | 1 | 1 | 1 | – | – | 1 |
| Kevin Wakesa | – | 4 | 4 | 4 | 4 | 4 | – | – | 8 |
| Derrick Ashihundu | – | – | 13 | 13 | – | – | – | – | – |
| Tony Omondi | – | – | 7 | 7 | 7 | 7 | 7 | 7 | 7 |
| Vincent Onyala | – | – | 11 | 11 | – | – | – | – | 4 |
| Zeden Marrow | – | – | – | – | 3 | 3 | – | – | – |
| Collins Shikoli | – | – | – | – | 13 | 13 | 13 | 13 | – |
| Richel Wangila | – | – | – | – | 6 | 6 | – | – | – |
| Salem Adoyo | – | – | – | – | – | – | 6 | 6 | – |
| Arcadias Huku | – | – | – | – | – | – | 1 | 1 | – |
| Lugonzo Ligamy | – | – | – | – | – | – | 4 | 4 | – |
| Willy Ambaka | – | – | – | – | – | – | – | – | 12 |
| Samuel Oliech | – | – | – | – | – | – | – | – | 10 |

== New Zealand ==
Head Coach: (Scotland) Clark Laidlaw

New Zealand team members 2021–22
| Player | Jersey number by tournament | | | | |
| Player | Singapore | Vancouver | Toulouse | London | Los Angeles |
|---|---|---|---|---|---|
| Leroy Carter | 10 | 11 | 10 | 10 | – |
| Dylan Collier | 5 | 5 | 5 | 5 | – |
| Sam Dickson | 7 | 7 | 7 | 7 | – |
| Trael Joass | 4 | 4 | – | – | – |
| Andrew Knewstubb | 8 | – | – | – | – |
| Moses Leo | 13 | 13 | – | – | 13 |
| Tone Ng Shiu | 3 | 3 | – | – | 3 |
| Akuila Rokolisoa | 6 | 6 | 6 | 6 | 4 |
| Brady Rush | 2 | 2 | 2 | 2 | – |
| Caleb Tangitau | 12 | 12 | 13 | 13 | 8 |
| Kitiona Vai | 1 | 1 | 1 | 1 | – |
| Regan Ware | 9 | 9 | 9 | 9 | 9 |
| Joe Webber | 11 | – | 11 | 11 | 11 |
| Kurt Baker | – | 10 | – | – | 10 |
| Ngarohi McGarvey-Black | – | 8 | 8 | 8 | 6 |
| Sione Molia | – | – | 12 | 12 | 12 |
| Amanaki Nicole | – | – | 3 | 3 | 1 |
| Roderick Solo | – | – | 4 | 4 | 7 |
| Che Clark | – | – | – | – | 2 |
| Lewis Ormond | – | – | – | – | 5 |

== Samoa ==
Head Coach: (Samoa) Brian Lima

Samoa team members 2021–22
| Player | Jersey number by tournament | | | | |
| Player | Singapore | Vancouver | Toulouse | London | Los Angeles |
|---|---|---|---|---|---|
| Miracle Faiilagi | 5 | 5 | 5 | 5 | – |
| Fa'afoi Falaniko | 9 | 9 | 9 | 9 | 9 |
| Va'a Apelu Maliko | 8 | 8 | 8 | 8 | 2 |
| Melani Matavao | 7 | 7 | 7 | 7 | 7 |
| Owen Niue | 11 | 11 | 11 | 11 | 11 |
| Steve Onosai | 12 | 12 | 12 | 12 | 12 |
| Motu Opetai | 4 | 4 | 4 | 4 | 4 |
| Iafeta Purcell | 6 | 6 | 6 | 6 | – |
| Paulo Scanlan | 10 | 10 | 10 | 10 | 10 |
| Uaina Sione | 3 | 3 | 3 | 3 | 3 |
| Indiha Saotui-Huta | 2 | 2 | – | – | – |
| Vaovasa Afa Su'a | 1 | 1 | 1 | 1 | 1 |
| Pelosi Taupo | 13 | 13 | – | – | – |
| Ati Junior Ati | – | – | 13 | 13 | – |
| Neueli Leitufia | – | – | 2 | 2 | 8 |
| Malo Luteru | – | – | – | – | 13 |
| Levi Milford | – | – | – | – | 5 |
| Taunu'u Niulevaea | – | – | – | – | 6 |

== Scotland ==
Head Coach: (Scotland) Ciaran Beattie

Scotland team members 2021–22
| Player | Jersey number by tournament | | | | | | |
| Player | Málaga | Seville | Singapore | Vancouver | Toulouse | London | Los Angeles |
|---|---|---|---|---|---|---|---|
| Kaleem Barreto | 4 | 4 | 4 | 4 | 4 | 4 | 4 |
| Fin Callaghan | 13 | 13 | – | – | – | – | 8 |
| Reiss Cullen | 9 | 9 | 9 | 9 | – | 5 | 9 |
| Matt Davidson | 2 | 2 | 2 | 2 | 2 | 2 | 2 |
| Jordan Edmunds | 1 | 1 | 1 | 1 | 1 | 1 | 1 |
| Harvey Elms | 5 | 5 | 5 | 5 | 5 | – | 5 |
| Jamie Farndale | 7 | 7 | 7 | 7 | 7 | 7 | 7 |
| Jacob Henry | 3 | 3 | 3 | 3 | – | – | – |
| Grant Hughes | 8 | 8 | 8 | 8 | 8 | 8 | – |
| Lee Jones | 11 | 11 | – | – | 11 | 11 | 11 |
| Paddy Kelly | 6 | 6 | 6 | 6 | 6 | 6 | 6 |
| Gavin Lowe | 10 | 10 | – | – | – | – | – |
| Ross McCann | 12 | 12 | 12 | 12 | 12 | 12 | 12 |
| Alec Coombes | – | – | 11 | 11 | 3 | 3 | – |
| Harry Paterson | – | – | 10 | 10 | – | – | – |
| Femi Sofolarin | – | – | 13 | 13 | 13 | 13 | 13 |
| Robbie Fergusson | – | – | – | – | 10 | 9 | 10 |
| Frederick Owsley | – | – | – | – | 9 | 10 | – |
| Callum Young | – | – | – | – | – | – | 3 |

== South Africa ==
Head Coach: (South Africa) Neil Powell

South Africa team members 2021–22
| Player | Jersey number by tournament | | | | | | | | |
| Player | Dubai I | Dubai II | Málaga | Seville | Singapore | Vancouver | Toulouse | London | Los Angeles |
|---|---|---|---|---|---|---|---|---|---|
| Ronald Brown | 10 | 10 | – | – | 7 | 7 | 9 | 9 | – |
| Selvyn Davids | 8 | 8 | 8 | 8 | 8 | 8 | – | – | – |
| Zain Davids | 4 | 4 | 4 | 4 | 4 | 4 | 4 | 4 | 4 |
| Muller du Plessis | 12 | 12 | – | – | – | – | 12 | 12 | 12 |
| Branco du Preez | 7 | 7 | 7 | 7 | – | – | 7 | 7 | 7 |
| Christie Grobbelaar | 1 | 1 | 5 | 5 | 5 | 5 | – | – | – |
| Ryan Oosthuizen | 2 | 2 | 2 | 2 | 2 | 2 | 2 | 2 | 2 |
| JC Pretorius | 6 | 6 | 6 | 6 | 6 | 6 | 6 | – | 6 |
| Tiaan Pretorius | 5 | 5 | – | – | – | – | 5 | – | – |
| Siviwe Soyizwapi | 11 | 11 | 11 | – | 11 | 11 | 11 | 11 | 11 |
| Shilton van Wyk | 13 | 13 | – | – | – | 12 | – | – | 8 |
| Impi Visser | 3 | 3 | 3 | 3 | 3 | 3 | 3 | 3 | – |
| Shaun Williams | 9 | 9 | – | 11 | – | 9 | – | – | 8 |
| Darren Adonis | – | – | 13 | 13 | 13 | 13 | – | – | 13 |
| Justin Geduld | – | – | 9 | 9 | – | – | – | – | – |
| Dewald Human | – | – | 10 | 10 | 10 | 10 | 10 | 10 | 10 |
| Sakoyisa Makata | – | – | 1 | 1 | 1 | – | – | 1 | 1 |
| Mfundo Ndhlovu | – | – | 12 | 12 | 12 | – | 13 | 13 | – |
| Lubabalo Dobela | – | – | – | – | 9 | – | – | – | – |
| James Murphy | – | – | – | – | – | 1 | 1 | 6 | 3 |
| Dalvon Blood | – | – | – | – | – | – | 8 | – | – |
| Angelo Davids | – | – | – | – | – | – | – | 5 | 5 |
| Jordan Hendrikse | – | – | – | – | – | – | – | 8 | – |

== Spain ==
Head Coach: (Spain) Pablo Feijoo

Spain team members 2021–22
| Player | Jersey number by tournament | | | | | | | | |
| Player | Dubai I | Dubai II | Málaga | Seville | Singapore | Vancouver | Toulouse | London | Los Angeles |
|---|---|---|---|---|---|---|---|---|---|
| Javier De Juan | 3 | 3 | 3 | 3 | 3 | 3 | 3 | – | – |
| Alejandro de la Rosa | 11 | – | – | – | – | – | – | – | – |
| Eduardo Lopez | 12 | 12 | 12 | 12 | 12 | 12 | 12 | 12 | – |
| Juan Martinez | 8 | 8 | 8 | 8 | 8 | 8 | 8 | – | – |
| Jaime Mata | 5 | 5 | – | – | – | – | – | – | – |
| Manu Moreno | 10 | 10 | 10 | 10 | 10 | 10 | 10 | 10 | – |
| Nico Nieto | 6 | 6 | 6 | 6 | 6 | 6 | 6 | 6 | – |
| Alex Perez | 13 | 13 | – | – | – | – | – | – | – |
| Pol Pla | 7 | 7 | 7 | 7 | 7 | 7 | 7 | – | – |
| Juan Ramos | 4 | 4 | 4 | 4 | 4 | 4 | 4 | 4 | – |
| Tiago Romero | 9 | 9 | 9 | 9 | 9 | 9 | – | 11 | – |
| Tobias Sainz-Trapaga | 1 | 1 | 1 | 1 | 1 | 1 | 1 | 1 | – |
| Josep Serres | 2 | 2 | 2 | 2 | 2 | 2 | 2 | 2 | – |
| Francisco Soriano | – | 11 | 11 | 11 | – | – | 9 | – | – |
| Enrique Bolinches | – | – | 13 | 13 | 13 | 13 | 13 | 13 | 13 |
| Miguel Reina | – | – | 5 | 5 | – | – | – | 9 | 4 |
| Jerry Davoibaravi | – | – | – | – | 11 | 11 | 11 | 7 | – |
| Manuel Sainz-Trapaga | – | – | – | – | 5 | 5 | – | 3 | – |
| Aratz De Goicoechea | – | – | – | – | – | – | 5 | 5 | 6 |
| Francisco Cosculluela | – | – | – | – | – | – | – | 8 | 5 |
| Ramon Caleya | – | – | – | – | – | – | – | – | 11 |
| Javier De Orbaneja | – | – | – | – | – | – | – | – | 1 |
| Alavaro Gassot | – | – | – | – | – | – | – | – | 8 |
| Alejandro Laforga | – | – | – | – | – | – | – | – | 2 |
| Anton Legorburu | – | – | – | – | – | – | – | – | 9 |
| Jamie Manteca | – | – | – | – | – | – | – | – | 7 |
| Xabier Martin | – | – | – | – | – | – | – | – | 10 |
| Albert Millan | – | – | – | – | – | – | – | – | 12 |
| Rodrigo Serrano | – | – | – | – | – | – | – | – | 3 |

== United States ==
Head Coach: (England) Mike Friday

United States team members 2021–22
| Player | Jersey number by tournament | | | | | | | | |
| Player | Dubai I | Dubai II | Málaga | Seville | Singapore | Vancouver | Toulouse | London | Los Angeles |
|---|---|---|---|---|---|---|---|---|---|
| Perry Baker | 11 | 11 | 11 | 11 | 11 | 11 | 11 | 11 | 11 |
| Gavan D'Amore | 3 | 3 | 3 | 3 | 3 | 3 | – | – | 2 |
| Naima Fuala'au | 10 | 10 | 10 | 10 | – | – | – | – | 10 |
| Martin Iosefo | 12 | 12 | – | – | – | – | – | – | – |
| Carlin Isles | 1 | 1 | 1 | 1 | – | – | – | – | – |
| Lucas Lacamp | 13 | 13 | – | – | 12 | 12 | 12 | 12 | 12 |
| Matai Leuta | 4 | 4 | – | – | – | – | – | – | – |
| Folau Niua | 7 | 7 | – | – | 7 | 7 | 7 | 7 | 7 |
| Joe Schroeder | 5 | 5 | 5 | 5 | 5 | 5 | 5 | 5 | 5 |
| Logan Tago | 2 | 2 | 2 | 2 | – | – | – | – | – |
| Stephen Tomasin | 9 | 9 | 9 | 9 | – | – | 9 | 9 | 9 |
| Marcus Tupuola | 8 | 8 | – | 13 | 1 | 1 | – | – | – |
| Kevon Williams | 6 | 6 | 6 | 6 | 6 | 6 | 6 | 6 | – |
| Maceo Brown | – | – | 8 | 8 | 13 | 13 | 4 | 4 | 4 |
| Aaron Cummings | – | – | 13 | – | – | – | – | – | 1 |
| Chase Schor Haskin | – | – | 4 | 4 | – | – | – | – | – |
| David Still | – | – | 12 | 12 | 4 | – | 3 | 3 | 3 |
| Tala Talapusi | – | – | 7 | 7 | 10 | 10 | 10 | 10 | – |
| Ben Broselle | – | – | – | – | 2 | 2 | 2 | 2 | – |
| Malacchi Esdale | – | – | – | – | 8 | 8 | 8 | 8 | 8 |
| Dmontae Noble | – | – | – | – | 9 | 9 | 1 | 1 | – |
| Adam Channel | – | – | – | – | – | 4 | 13 | 13 | – |
| Cody Melphy | – | – | – | – | – | – | – | – | 13 |
| Maka Unufe | – | – | – | – | – | – | – | – | 6 |

== Wales ==
Head Coach: (Wales) Richie Pugh

Wales team members 2021–22
| Player | Jersey number by tournament | | | | | | |
| Player | Málaga | Seville | Singapore | Vancouver | Toulouse | London | Los Angeles |
|---|---|---|---|---|---|---|---|
| Tom Brown | 5 | 5 | 5 | 5 | 5 | 5 | 5 |
| Callum Carson | 2 | 2 | – | – | – | – | 7 |
| Lloyd Evans | 1 | 1 | 1 | – | – | – | – |
| Owen Jenkins | 10 | 10 | – | – | 7 | 7 | – |
| Arthur Lennon | 7 | 7 | 7 | 7 | – | – | – |
| Lloyd Lewis | 11 | 11 | 11 | 11 | 11 | 11 | 11 |
| Morgan McRae | 4 | 4 | – | – | – | – | – |
| Ewan Rosser | 12 | 12 | 12 | 12 | 12 | 12 | 12 |
| Francisco Souto | 3 | 3 | – | – | – | – | – |
| Cole Swannack | 13 | 13 | 13 | 13 | 13 | 13 | 10 |
| Luke Treharne | 6 | 6 | – | 1 | 1 | 1 | 1 |
| Morgan Williams | 9 | 9 | 9 | 9 | 9 | 9 | 9 |
| Tom Williams | 8 | 8 | 8 | 8 | 8 | 8 | – |
| Iwan Pyrs Jones | – | – | 10 | 10 | 10 | 10 | 8 |
| Carrick McDonough | – | – | 2 | 2 | – | – | – |
| Morgan Sieniawski | – | – | 3 | 3 | 3 | 3 | 3 |
| Chris Smith | – | – | 4 | 4 | – | – | 4 |
| Callum Williams | – | – | 6 | 6 | 6 | 6 | 6 |
| Afon Bagshaw | – | – | – | – | 4 | 4 | – |
| Tyler Morgan | – | – | – | – | 2 | 2 | – |
| Iestyn Rees | – | – | – | – | – | – | 2 |
| Kane Teear-Bourge | – | – | – | – | – | – | 13 |

== Non-core teams ==
Great Britain played in the first two rounds of the series, which both took place in Dubai, because of the existing agreement to compete as Great Britain through the end of 2021, before England, Scotland and Wales resumed competing separately in 2022. Germany replaced New Zealand at Málaga and Seville, because New Zealand could not travel due to COVID-19 restrictions. Jamaica replaced Samoa at Málaga and Seville, because Samoa was also unable to travel due to the COVID-19 pandemic.

== Germany ==
Head Coach: (England) Damian McGrath

Germany team members 2021–22
| Player | Jersey number by tournament | |
| Player | Málaga | Seville |
|---|---|---|
| Anjo Buckman | 1 | – |
| John Dawe | 3 | 3 |
| Leon Hees | 8 | 8 |
| Fabian Heimpel | 6 | 6 |
| Felix Hufnagel | 4 | 4 |
| Jack Hunt | 10 | 10 |
| Tim Lichtenberg | 12 | 12 |
| Robin Pluempe | 11 | – |
| Samuel Rainger | 5 | 5 |
| Carlos Soteras Merz | 7 | 7 |
| Phil Szczesny | 9 | 9 |
| Chris Umeh | 13 | 13 |
| Bastian van der Bosch | 2 | 2 |
| Ben Ellermann | – | 1 |
| Manasah Sita | – | 11 |

== Great Britain ==
Head Coach: (Scotland) Ciaran Beattie

Great Britain team members 2021–22
| Player | Jersey number by tournament | |
| Player | Dubai I | Dubai II |
|---|---|---|
| Jamie Barden | 9 | 9 |
| Tom Bowen | 8 | 8 |
| Alex Davis | 3 | 3 |
| Jamie Farndale | 7 | 7 |
| Robbie Fergusson | 6 | 6 |
| Paddy Kelly | 11 | 11 |
| Ross McCann | 10 | 10 |
| Max McFarland | 12 | 12 |
| Freddie Roddick | 13 | 13 |
| Luke Treharne | 1 | 1 |
| Will Trenholm | 5 | 5 |
| Morgan Williams | 2 | 2 |
| Tom Williams | 4 | 4 |

== Jamaica ==
Head Coach: (England) James Bailey

Jamaica team members 2021–22
| Player | Jersey number by tournament | |
| Player | Málaga | Seville |
|---|---|---|
| Rhodri Adamson | 6 | – |
| Tyler Bush | 10 | 10 |
| Oscar Clayton | 7 | 7 |
| Omar Dixon | 12 | – |
| Josh Jacas | 14 | – |
| Chris McIntosh | 13 | – |
| Cameron Melville | 9 | 9 |
| Jack Rampton | 4 | – |
| Lucas Roy-Smith | 5 | 5 |
| Ashley Smith | 11 | 11 |
| Christian Squire | 2 | 2 |
| Gareth Stoppani | 8 | 8 |
| Tom Taylor-Dawes | 1 | 1 |
| Nathan Annakie | – | 6 |
| Anthony Bingham | – | 13 |
| Sam Caven | – | 12 |
| Dy'Neal Fe'ssal | – | 14 |
| Jordan Sullivan-Warner | – | 4 |
