= Kevin Wambua =

Kenyan rugby union coach and former player

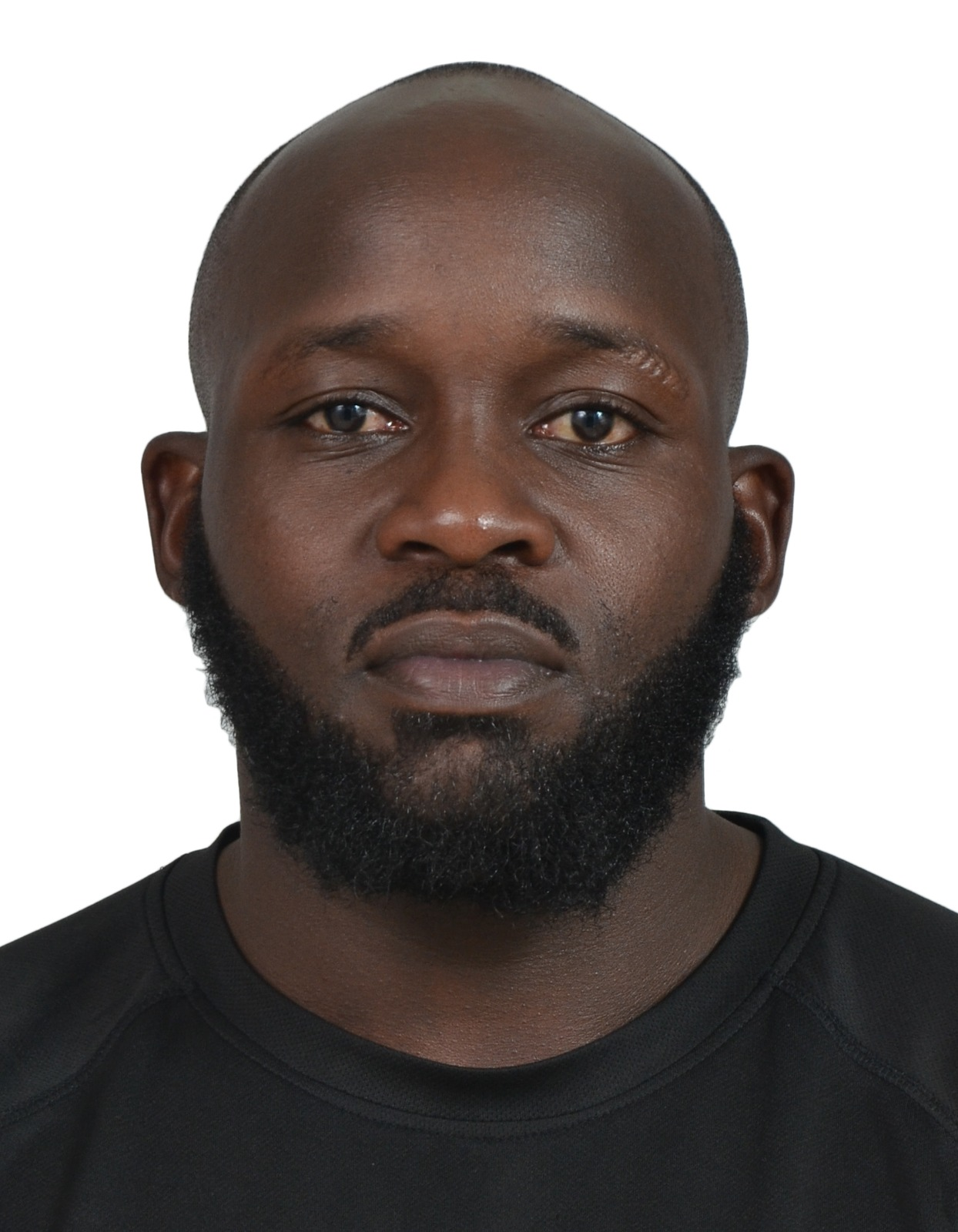

Personal information
- Full name: Kevin Wambua Muema
- Born: 8 October 1985 (age 40)

Playing information
- Position: Flyhalf
Club
Years	Team	Pld	T	G	FG	P
2007–2011	Mwamba RFC

Coaching information
Club
Years	Team	Gms	W	D	L	W%
2023–Present	Kenya national rugby sevens team				=
2012–2019	Kenya women's national rugby sevens team
2016–2023	Mwamba RFC
2012–2019	Laiser Hill Academy
	Total	0	0	0

Kevin Wambua Mwema is a Kenyan rugby union coach and former player. Since 4 August 2023, he has served as head coach of the Kenya national rugby sevens team (Shujaa).

== Early life and playing career ==
Wambua began his rugby career as a player with Mwamba RFC.

During his time as a player, Wambua suffered an ankle injury which sidelined him for three months. Following this injury, he transitioned into coaching, starting with the Mwamba second team.

During his playing career, Mwamba RFC won four Kenya National Sevens Circuit titles, in 2007, 2008, 2010 and 2011.

== Coaching career ==
After moving into coaching, Wambua's first appointment was at Mwamba RFC, where he previously played. He also coached the Peponi School and Laiser Hill Academy teams.

Wambua coached the Laiser Hill Academy rugby team from 2012 to 2019, and in 2015, the team won the national and East African school tournament titles.

He was appointed the head coach of the Kenya Lionesses and Daystar University rugby teams.

Wambua previously held assistant-coach positions in the Kenya women's sevens national team From 2012 to 2019, he served as coach of the national women's team, the Lionesses, both at 7s and 15s.

=== Appointment as Shujaa head coach ===
On 4 August 2023, the Kenya Rugby Union (KRU) officially confirmed Wambua as head coach of the men's national sevens team. He had previously served as deputy head coach under Damian McGrath, who was dismissed after Shujaa's relegation from the World Rugby Sevens Series in 2023.

He had served as the men's sevens team assistant coach from 2018 to 2023 under Paul Murunga, Paul Feeney and Damian McGrath, before being appointed as head coach.

Wambua coached the Kenya team to promotion back to the World Rugby Sevens Series by defeating Germany 33–15 in the playoff final in Madrid.

With Wambua as head coach, the Kenya team also qualified for the 2024 Summer Olympics in Paris after beating South Africa in the 2023 continental qualification tournament in Harare, Zimbabwe.

The Kenya team finished ninth at the 2024 Olympics.

Kenya was relegated again after the 2025-25 season, and with Wambua as coach, the team will play the first leg of the Challenger Series in Nairobi in February 2026.
