= 2022 London Sevens =

Rugby sevens tournament

- Sevens World Series XXIII
- Host nation: England
- Date: 28–29 May 2022

Cup
- Champion: Australia
- Runner-up: New Zealand
- Third: Fiji

Tournament details
- Matches played: 45
- Tries scored: 128 (average 2.84 per match)
- Most points: Ngarohi McGarvey-Black (50 points)
- Most tries: Terry Kennedy (8 tries)

The 2022 London Sevens was the twentieth edition of the annual rugby sevens event held at Twickenham Stadium, Richmond, London.

The tournament winners were Australia. Australia won their second London Sevens event, beating trans-tasman rivals New Zealand in a thrilling extra-time victory (19–14). Two-time back-to-back defending champions Fiji finished third, beating Pacific Island neighbours Samoa 31–26.

The final victory was the first Sevens Series Australia has won since their home Sevens Series win in 2018 (4 years, 121 days). Following the event Australia jumped from third to second on the Sevens Series ladder. Similarly New Zealand jumped two places following their second-place finish (eleventh to ninth).

In World Rugby Sevens Series history, the second-last event of the series has been almost futile regarding seasonal points that the teams are vying for as most teams' points accrued in the second-last event would not affect their overall standing. However, during the 2021–22 season, the season standings pre- and post-London Sevens have been the most competitive since the establishment of the Sevens Series, with just eight points separating the top three teams (two points between the top two) before the tournament and six points after it. By the final event, there are mathematically four teams capable of taking the 2021–22 World Rugby Sevens Series title.

== Format ==
The sixteen teams were drawn into four pools of four. Each team played the three opponents in their pool once. The top two teams from each pool advanced to the Cup bracket, with the losers of the quarterfinals vying for a fifth-place finish. The remaining eight teams that finished third or fourth in their pool played off for 9th place, with the losers of the 9th-place quarterfinals competing for 13th place.

== Teams ==
The sixteen national teams competing in London were:

- Argentina
- Australia
- Canada
- England
- Fiji
- France
- Ireland
- Japan
- Kenya
- New Zealand
- Samoa
- Scotland
- South Africa
- Spain
- United States
- Wales

== Pool stage ==
The pools were officially announced on 25 May.

Team advances to the Cup quarter-finals

=== Pool A ===
Team	Pld	W	D	L	PF	PA	PD	Pts
Fiji	3	3	0	0	93	55	+38	9
Spain	3	2	0	1	87	56	+31	7
United States	3	1	0	2	62	71	–9	5
Wales	3	0	0	3	53	113	–60	3

28 May
GMT (UTC±0)

United States	10–26	Spain
	Report

Twickenham Stadium

28 May
GMT (UTC±0)

Fiji	38–17	Wales
	Report

Twickenham Stadium

28 May
GMT (UTC±0)

United States	33–19	Wales
	Report

Twickenham Stadium

28 May
GMT (UTC±0)

Fiji	29–19	Spain
	Report

Twickenham Stadium

28 May
GMT (UTC±0)

Spain	42–17	Wales
	Report

Twickenham Stadium

28 May
GMT (UTC±0)

Fiji	26–19	United States
	Report

Twickenham Stadium

=== Pool B ===
Team	Pld	W	D	L	PF	PA	PD	Pts
South Africa	3	3	0	0	69	52	+17	9
Ireland	3	2	0	1	51	54	–3	7
Argentina	3	1	0	2	66	48	+18	5
Kenya	3	0	0	3	35	67	–32	3

28 May
GMT (UTC±0)

Argentina	19–26	South Africa
	Report

Twickenham Stadium

28 May
GMT (UTC±0)

Ireland	17–14	Kenya
	Report

Twickenham Stadium

28 May
GMT (UTC±0)

Argentina	26–0	Kenya
	Report

Twickenham Stadium

28 May
GMT (UTC±0)

Ireland	12–19	South Africa
	Report

Twickenham Stadium

28 May
GMT (UTC±0)

South Africa	24–21	Kenya
	Report

Twickenham Stadium

28 May
GMT (UTC±0)

Ireland	22–21	Argentina
	Report

Twickenham Stadium

=== Pool C ===
Team	Pld	W	D	L	PF	PA	PD	Pts
New Zealand	3	3	0	0	100	40	+60	9
Australia	3	2	0	1	73	48	+25	7
France	3	1	0	2	45	78	–33	5
Canada	3	0	0	3	33	85	–52	3

28 May
GMT (UTC±0)

Australia	19–24	New Zealand
	Report

Twickenham Stadium

28 May
GMT (UTC±0)

France	19–14	Canada
	Report

Twickenham Stadium

28 May
GMT (UTC±0)

Australia	26–5	Canada
	Report

Twickenham Stadium

28 May
GMT (UTC±0)

France	7–36	New Zealand
	Report

Twickenham Stadium

28 May
GMT (UTC±0)

New Zealand	40–14	Canada
	Report

Twickenham Stadium

28 May
GMT (UTC±0)

France	19–28	Australia
	Report

Twickenham Stadium

=== Pool D ===
Team	Pld	W	D	L	PF	PA	PD	Pts
Samoa	3	3	0	0	73	46	+27	9
England	3	2	0	1	76	55	+21	7
Scotland	3	1	0	2	53	40	+13	5
Japan	3	0	0	3	34	95	–61	3

28 May
GMT (UTC±0)

England	19–17	Scotland
	Report

Twickenham Stadium

28 May
GMT (UTC±0)

Samoa	33–15	Japan
	Report

Twickenham Stadium

28 May
GMT (UTC±0)

England	38–12	Japan
	Report

Twickenham Stadium

28 May
GMT (UTC±0)

Samoa	14–12	Scotland
	Report

Twickenham Stadium

28 May
GMT (UTC±0)

Scotland	24–7	Japan
	Report

Twickenham Stadium

28 May
GMT (UTC±0)

Samoa	26–19	England
	Report

Twickenham Stadium

== Knockout stage ==
=== 13th–16th playoffs ===
13th place Semi-finals
29 May – Twickenham Stadium
Japan	14
Kenya	5
29 May – Twickenham Stadium
Wales	21
Canada	22

13th place Final
29 May – Twickenham Stadium
Japan	19
Canada	26

Matches

Semi-finals

29 May
GMT (UTC±0)

Japan	14–5	Kenya
	Report

Twickenham Stadium

29 May
GMT (UTC±0)

Wales	21–22	Canada
	Report

Twickenham Stadium

13th place Final

29 May
GMT (UTC±0)

Japan	19–26	Canada
	Report

Twickenham Stadium

=== 9th–12th playoffs ===
Quarter-finals
29 May – Twickenham Stadium
United States	26
Japan	24
29 May – Twickenham Stadium
France	31
Kenya	0
29 May – Twickenham Stadium
Scotland	14
Wales	5
29 May – Twickenham Stadium
Argentina	28
Canada	7

Semi-finals
29 May – Twickenham Stadium
United States	31
France	19
29 May – Twickenham Stadium
Scotland	12
Argentina	26

9th Place Final
29 May – Twickenham Stadium
United States	5
Argentina	31

Matches

Quarter-finals

29 May
GMT (UTC±0)

United States	26–24	Japan
	Report

Twickenham Stadium

29 May
GMT (UTC±0)

France	31–0	Kenya
	Report

Twickenham Stadium

29 May
GMT (UTC±0)

Scotland	14–5	Wales
	Report

Twickenham Stadium

29 May
GMT (UTC±0)

Argentina	28–7	Canada
	Report

Twickenham Stadium

Semi-finals

29 May
GMT (UTC±0)

United States	31–19	France
	Report

Twickenham Stadium

29 May
GMT (UTC±0)

Scotland	12–26	Argentina
	Report

Twickenham Stadium

9th place Final

29 May
GMT (UTC±0)

United States	5–31	Argentina
	Report

Twickenham Stadium

=== 5th–8th playoffs ===
5th place Semi-finals
29 May – Twickenham Stadium
England	12
Ireland	36
29 May – Twickenham Stadium
Spain	12
South Africa	24

5th place Final
29 May – Twickenham Stadium
Ireland	5
South Africa	14

Matches

Semi-finals

29 May
GMT (UTC±0)

England	12–36	Ireland
	Report

Twickenham Stadium

29 May
GMT (UTC±0)

Spain	12–24	South Africa
	Report

Twickenham Stadium

5th place Final

29 May
GMT (UTC±0)

Ireland	5–14	South Africa
	Report

Twickenham Stadium

=== Cup playoffs ===
Quarter-finals
29 May – Twickenham Stadium
Fiji	36
England	10
29 May – Twickenham Stadium
New Zealand	17
Ireland	7
29 May – Twickenham Stadium
Samoa	34
Spain	12
29 May – Twickenham Stadium
South Africa	17
Australia	21

Semi-finals
29 May – Twickenham Stadium
Fiji	19
New Zealand	22
29 May – Twickenham Stadium
Samoa	14
Australia	28

Cup Final
29 May – Twickenham Stadium
New Zealand	14
Australia	19 (a.e.t.)
Third place
29 May – Twickenham Stadium
Fiji	31
Samoa	26

Matches

Quarter-finals

29 May
GMT (UTC±0)

Fiji	36–10	England
	Report

Twickenham Stadium

29 May
GMT (UTC±0)

New Zealand	17–7	Ireland
	Report

Twickenham Stadium

29 May
GMT (UTC±0)

Samoa	34–12	Spain
	Report

Twickenham Stadium

29 May
GMT (UTC±0)

South Africa	17–21	Australia
	Report

Twickenham Stadium

Semi-finals

29 May
GMT (UTC±0)

Fiji	19–22	New Zealand
	Report

Twickenham Stadium

29 May
GMT (UTC±0)

Samoa	14–28	Australia
	Report

Twickenham Stadium

Third place

29 May
GMT (UTC±0)

Fiji	31–26	Samoa
	Report

Twickenham Stadium

Cup Final

29 May
GMT (UTC±0)

New Zealand	14–19 (a.e.t.)	Australia
	Report

Twickenham Stadium

=== Placings ===
Place	Team	Points
1st place, gold medalist(s)	Australia	22
2nd place, silver medalist(s)	New Zealand	19
3rd place, bronze medalist(s)	Fiji	17
4	Samoa	15
5	South Africa	13
6	Ireland	12
7	England	10
7	Spain	10

Place	Team	Points
9	Argentina	8
10	United States	7
11	France	5
11	Scotland	5
13	Canada	3
14	Japan	2
15	Wales	1
15	Kenya	1

Sevens Series XXIII
Preceded by 2022 France Sevens	2022 London Sevens	Succeeded by 2022 USA Sevens
London Sevens
Preceded by 2019 London Sevens	2022 London Sevens	Succeeded by 2023 London Sevens
