= Damian McGrath =

English rugby footballer & coach

Personal information
- Born: 1958 (age 67–68) Bradford, West Riding of Yorkshire, England

Playing information
Club
Years	Team	Pld	T	G	FG	P
1987–1990	Batley

Coaching information
Club
Years	Team	Gms	W	D	L	W%
	Leeds Rhinos

Rugby union career
Coaching career
- Years: Team
- 2013–2015: England 7s Assistant Coach
- 2015: Samoa 7s
- 2016–2019: Canada 7s
- 2020–22: Germany 7s
- 2022-2023: Kenya 7s

Damian McGrath (born Bradford, West Riding of Yorkshire, England in 1958) played professional rugby league at Batley before embarking on a successful coaching career, which has encompassed both codes of rugby football at club and international level. He was the head coach of the Kenya national rugby sevens team from 2022 to 2023.

== Rugby league ==
His first post was as reserve team coach at Batley RLFC. He was then appointed to the staff at Leeds Rhinos.

Championships at academy and reserve team level for Leeds were followed by elevation to the senior coaching staff as Super League began. The club played in two Challenge Cup Finals (including victory in the last final played at the old Wembley Stadium) and made an appearance in the inaugural Super League Grand Final in 1998.

== England teams ==
On the international stage, McGrath coached the Great Britain Academy team and Great Britain U21s which culminated in his appointment as assistant coach to the senior England team in 1999 and for the 2000 Rugby League World Cup. In 2001 he was recruited by the Rugby Football Union to the joint post of Defence and Skills coach for the England ‘A’ team and the England sevens team.

Over a period of five years the England sevens team won four Hong Kong titles, appeared at the 2002 Commonwealth Games in Manchester, and the 2005 Rugby Sevens World Cup.

McGrath also coached the England U19s to a World Cup 3rd-place finish in 2006, coached the Junior England 7s to a silver medal at the 2004 Junior Commonwealth Games in Melbourne and toured North America with the England ‘A’ team. He was defence coach for the senior England team against The Barbarians in 2005.

On the club front, he had two seasons as first team skills coach at Leicester Tigers, from 2002 to 2004. In 2006 he began a successful stint as skills and defence coach for the Spanish RFU, which coincided with their rise from 38th to 20th in the world rankings.

After a brief return to Rugby League as the Head of Performance at Huddersfield Giants he returned to rugby union as Head of Rugby in North Wales in 2011. He established the region in the top echelons of Welsh rugby.

== Sevens ==
McGrath then moved to rugby sevens. He coached the GB Students 7s team to Gold Medal success in the 2014 World Student Games in Brazil.

McGrath was appointed as the head coach of Samoa 7s in 2015, achieving success on the World Series including winning the Paris title and dramatically improving their world ranking.

In October 2016, McGrath was appointed as the head coach of Canada's national men's 7s team. He led the team from 13th to 8th in the World Rankings, including a tournament victory at the 2017 Singapore Sevens, Canada’s first win on the World Series circuit.

He was head coach of the Germany national rugby sevens team, with his goal at the time being to help the team get promoted to core team status on the World Rugby Sevens Series.

He was the head coach of the Kenya national rugby sevens team from 2022 to 2023, when he was replaced by Kevin Wambua.
