= 2022 USA Sevens =

Rugby sevens tournament

- Sevens World Series XXIII
- Host nation: United States
- Date: 27–28 August 2022

Cup
- Champion: New Zealand
- Runner-up: Fiji
- Third: Australia

Tournament details
- Matches played: 45

The 2022 USA Sevens was the seventeenth edition of the rugby sevens tournament. It was held at Dignity Health Sports Park in Carson, Los Angeles, California between 27 and 28 August 2022. The title defenders were five-time USA Sevens champions South Africa.

The final event of the season saw the most competitive sole event in World Rugby Sevens Series history as all sixteen core teams vied for the event title, four of whom were simultaneously vying for the series title (South Africa, Australia, Argentina, Fiji).

On the season standings for the 2021–22 season post-London were the most competitive since the establishment of the Sevens Series, with just six points separating the top three teams (two points between the top two). There were four teams mathematically capable of winning the series, depending on the results of this event.

At the conclusion of day one, when all the pool fixtures had been played, South Africa finished third in their pool, thus were not eligible to play in the Cup playoffs and were eliminated from winning the event and the series.

New Zealand won the tournament claiming their first win in the series after beating Fiji 28–21. New Zealand's victory, along with Argentina's quarterfinal loss, South Africa's defeat in the pool stages, and Australia's third place finish, meant that Australia were crowned World Series champions for the first time.

== Format ==
The sixteen teams were drawn into four pools of four. Each team played the three opponents in their pool once. The top two teams from each pool advanced to the Cup bracket, with the losers of the quarter-finals vying for a fifth-place finish. The remaining eight teams that finished third or fourth in their pool played off for 9th place, with the losers of the 9th-place quarter-finals competing for 13th place.

== Teams ==
The sixteen national teams competing in Los Angeles were:

- Argentina
- Australia
- Canada
- England
- Fiji
- France
- Ireland
- Japan
- Kenya
- New Zealand
- Samoa
- Scotland
- South Africa
- Spain
- United States
- Wales

== Pool stage ==
Team advances to the Cup quarter-finals

=== Pool A ===
Team	Pld	W	D	L	PF	PA	PD	Pts
Australia	3	3	0	0	134	14	+120	9
Argentina	3	2	0	1	100	38	+62	7
Japan	3	1	0	2	45	95	–50	5
Spain	3	0	0	3	7	139	–132	3

27 August
11:32 PDT (UTC–7)

Spain	7–52	Argentina
	Report

Dignity Health Sports Park

27 August
12:04 PDT (UTC–7)

Australia	61–0	Japan
	Report

Dignity Health Sports Park

27 August
14:53 PDT (UTC–7)

Spain	0–33	Japan
	Report

Dignity Health Sports Park

27 August
15:15 PDT (UTC–7)

Australia	19–14	Argentina
	Report

Dignity Health Sports Park

27 August
18:35 PDT (UTC–7)

Argentina	34–12	Japan
	Report

Dignity Health Sports Park

27 August
19:03 PDT (UTC–7)

Australia	54–0	Spain
	Report

Dignity Health Sports Park

=== Pool B ===
Team	Pld	W	D	L	PF	PA	PD	Pts
New Zealand	3	3	0	0	76	31	+45	9
United States	3	2	0	1	59	57	+2	7
South Africa	3	1	0	2	43	55	–12	5
Canada	3	0	0	3	39	74	–35	3

27 August
9:20 PDT (UTC–7)

South Africa	7–21	United States
	Report

Dignity Health Sports Park

27 August
9:42 PDT (UTC–7)

New Zealand	26–5	Canada
	Report

Dignity Health Sports Park

27 August
12:26 PDT (UTC–7)

South Africa	22–17	Canada
	Report

Dignity Health Sports Park

27 August
12:48 PDT (UTC–7)

New Zealand	33–12	United States
	Report

Dignity Health Sports Park

27 August
15:37 PDT (UTC–7)

United States	26–17	Canada
	Report

Dignity Health Sports Park

27 August
15:59 PDT (UTC–7)

New Zealand	17–14	South Africa
	Report

Dignity Health Sports Park

=== Pool C ===
Team	Pld	W	D	L	PF	PA	PD	Pts
Fiji	3	3	0	0	78	38	+40	9
Ireland	3	2	0	1	67	45	+22	7
France	3	1	0	2	57	55	+2	5
Wales	3	0	0	3	36	100	–64	3

27 August
10:48 PDT (UTC–7)

Ireland	14–12	France
	Report

Dignity Health Sports Park

27 August
11:10 PDT (UTC–7)

Fiji	28–12	Wales
	Report

Dignity Health Sports Park

27 August
14:09 PDT (UTC–7)

Ireland	46–12	Wales
	Report

Dignity Health Sports Park

27 August
14:31 PDT (UTC–7)

Fiji	29–19	France
	Report

Dignity Health Sports Park

27 August
17:37 PDT (UTC–7)

France	26–12	Wales
	Report

Dignity Health Sports Park

27 August
18:05 PDT (UTC–7)

Fiji	21–7	Ireland
	Report

Dignity Health Sports Park

=== Pool D ===
Team	Pld	W	D	L	PF	PA	PD	Pts
Samoa	3	3	0	0	86	26	+60	9
Kenya	3	2	0	1	53	57	–4	7
Scotland	3	1	0	2	36	47	–11	5
England	3	0	0	3	24	69	–45	3

27 August
10:04 PDT (UTC–7)

England	5–19	Scotland
	Report

Dignity Health Sports Park

27 August
10:26 PDT (UTC–7)

Samoa	33–14	Kenya
	Report

Dignity Health Sports Park

27 August
13:10 PDT (UTC–7)

England	14–19	Kenya
	Report

Dignity Health Sports Park

27 August
13:32 PDT (UTC–7)

Samoa	22–7	Scotland
	Report

Dignity Health Sports Park

27 August
16:21 PDT (UTC–7)

Scotland	10–20	Kenya
	Report

Dignity Health Sports Park

27 August
16:43 PDT (UTC–7)

Samoa	31–5	England
	Report

Dignity Health Sports Park

== Knockout stage ==
=== 13th–16th playoffs ===
13th place Semi-finals
28 August – Dignity Health Sports Park
Japan	26
Canada	19
28 August – Dignity Health Sports Park
Spain	12
South Africa	29

13th place Final
28 August – Dignity Health Sports Park
Japan	0
South Africa	26

Matches

Semi-finals

28 August
11:51 PDT (UTC–7)

v
Report

Dignity Health Sports Park

28 August
12:13 PDT (UTC–7)

v
Report

Dignity Health Sports Park

13th place Final

28 August
15:01 PDT (UTC–7)

v
Report

Dignity Health Sports Park

=== 9th–12th playoffs ===
Quarter-finals
28 August – Dignity Health Sports Park
Japan	15
England	36
28 August – Dignity Health Sports Park
France	42
Canada	0
28 August – Dignity Health Sports Park
Scotland	28
Spain	7
28 August – Dignity Health Sports Park
South Africa	5
Wales	10

Semi-finals
28 August – Dignity Health Sports Park
England	7
France	19
28 August – Dignity Health Sports Park
Scotland	19
Wales	7

9th Place Final
28 August – Dignity Health Sports Park
France	33
Scotland	0

Matches

Quarter-finals

28 August
8:45 PDT (UTC–7)

Japan	v	England
	Report

Dignity Health Sports Park

28 August
9:07 PDT (UTC–7)

France	v	Canada
	Report

Dignity Health Sports Park

28 August
9:29 PDT (UTC–7)

Scotland	v	Spain
	Report

Dignity Health Sports Park

28 August
9:51 PDT (UTC–7)

South Africa	v	Wales
	Report

Dignity Health Sports Park

Semi-finals

28 August
12:35 PDT (UTC–7)

v
Report

Dignity Health Sports Park

28 August
13:03 PDT (UTC–7)

v
Report

Dignity Health Sports Park

9th place Final

28 August
16:07 PDT (UTC–7)

v
Report

Dignity Health Sports Park

=== 5th–8th playoffs ===
5th place Semi-finals
28 August – Dignity Health Sports Park
Kenya	21
United States	14
28 August – Dignity Health Sports Park
Argentina	28
Ireland	21

5th place Final
28 August – Dignity Health Sports Park
Kenya	7
Argentina	29

Matches

Semi-finals

28 August
13:25 PDT (UTC–7)

v
Report

Dignity Health Sports Park

28 August
13:47 PDT (UTC–7)

v
Report

Dignity Health Sports Park

5th place Final

28 August
16:31 PDT (UTC–7)

v
Report

Dignity Health Sports Park

=== Cup playoffs ===
Quarter-finals
28 August – Dignity Health Sports Park
Australia	40
Kenya	14
28 August – Dignity Health Sports Park
Fiji	28
United States	12
28 August – Dignity Health Sports Park
Samoa	24
Argentina	19
28 August – Dignity Health Sports Park
New Zealand	29
Ireland	14

Semi-finals
28 August – Dignity Health Sports Park
Australia	10
Fiji	29
28 August – Dignity Health Sports Park
Samoa	26
New Zealand	28

Cup Final
28 August – Dignity Health Sports Park
Fiji	21
New Zealand	28
Third place
28 August – Dignity Health Sports Park
Australia	21
Samoa	7

Matches

Quarter-finals

28 August
10:13 PDT (UTC–7)

Australia	v	Kenya
	Report

Dignity Health Sports Park

28 August
10:35 PDT (UTC–7)

Fiji	v	United States
	Report

Dignity Health Sports Park

28 August
10:57 PDT (UTC–7)

Samoa	v	Argentina
	Report

Dignity Health Sports Park

28 August
11:19 PDT (UTC–7)

New Zealand	v	Ireland
	Report

Dignity Health Sports Park

Semi-finals

28 August
14:09 PDT (UTC–7)

v
Report

Dignity Health Sports Park

28 August
14:31 PDT (UTC–7)

v
Report

Dignity Health Sports Park

Third place

28 August
16:58 PDT (UTC–7)

v
Report

Dignity Health Sports Park

Cup Final

28 August
17:28 PDT (UTC–7)

v
Report

Dignity Health Sports Park

=== Placings ===
Place	Team	Points
1st place, gold medalist(s)	New Zealand	22
2nd place, silver medalist(s)	Fiji	19
3rd place, bronze medalist(s)	Australia	17
4	Samoa	15
5	Argentina	13
6	Kenya	12
7	Ireland	10
7	United States	10

Place	Team	Points
9	France	8
10	Scotland	7
11	England	5
11	Wales	5
13	South Africa	3
14	Japan	2
15	Canada	1
15	Spain	1

Sevens Series XXIII
Preceded by 2022 London Sevens	2022 USA Sevens	Succeeded by Final event
USA Sevens
Preceded by 2020 USA Sevens	2022 USA Sevens	Succeeded by 2023 USA Sevens
