= Will Trenholm =

English rugby union player (born 2001)

- Full name: Will Trenholm
- Born: 6 September 2001 (age 25) London, England
- Height: 190 cm (6 ft 3 in)
- Weight: 110 kg (243 lb; 17 st 5 lb)
- School: Cranleigh School

Rugby union career
- Position(s): Flanker, Number 8
- Current team: Gloucester
Youth career
- 20??–20??: Farnham RUFC
- 2014–2021: Harlequins
Senior career
Years	Team	Apps	(Points)
2021–2025	Harlequins	17	(10)
2021–2025	→ London Scottish (loan)	44	(55)
2025–	Gloucester	26	(50)
- Correct as of 23 October 2026
International career
Years	Team	Apps	(Points)
2019	South of England under-17		
2019–2020	England under-18	3	(10)
- Correct as of 13 March 2024
National sevens teams
Years	Team		Comps
2022	England		5
2022	Great Britain		2
- Correct as of 11 March 2024

Will Trenholm (born 6 September 2001) is an English professional rugby union player who plays as a backrow for PREM club Gloucester.

== Club career ==
Trenholm played junior rugby at Farnham RUFC. He joined Harlequins academy at the age of thirteen. With his school side he won the 2018-19 Daily Mail Cup and was runners up for Rosslyn Park Rugby Sevens Cup in 2016.

In March 2022, Trenholm made his full senior debut for Harlequins in a Premiership Rugby Cup clash against London Irish. He started at blindside in the 34–19 loss. He has also featured for London Scottish in the RFU Championship on loan.

On 7 May 2025, it was announced that Trenholm had left Harlequins to join PREM rivals Gloucester Rugby from the 2025–26 season.

== International career ==
In 2019, Trenholm was selected for the South of England under-17 squad. He played for England under-18 in the 2019 under-18 international series in South Africa. He scored two tries in Englands clash against France under-18. He was named in the England under-18 squad for 2020.

Trenholm began playing for England Sevens in 2022, making his debut in the 2022 Spain Sevens. He also featured for Great Britain Sevens.
